= Coast Clash =

Australian rules football rivalry in Queensland

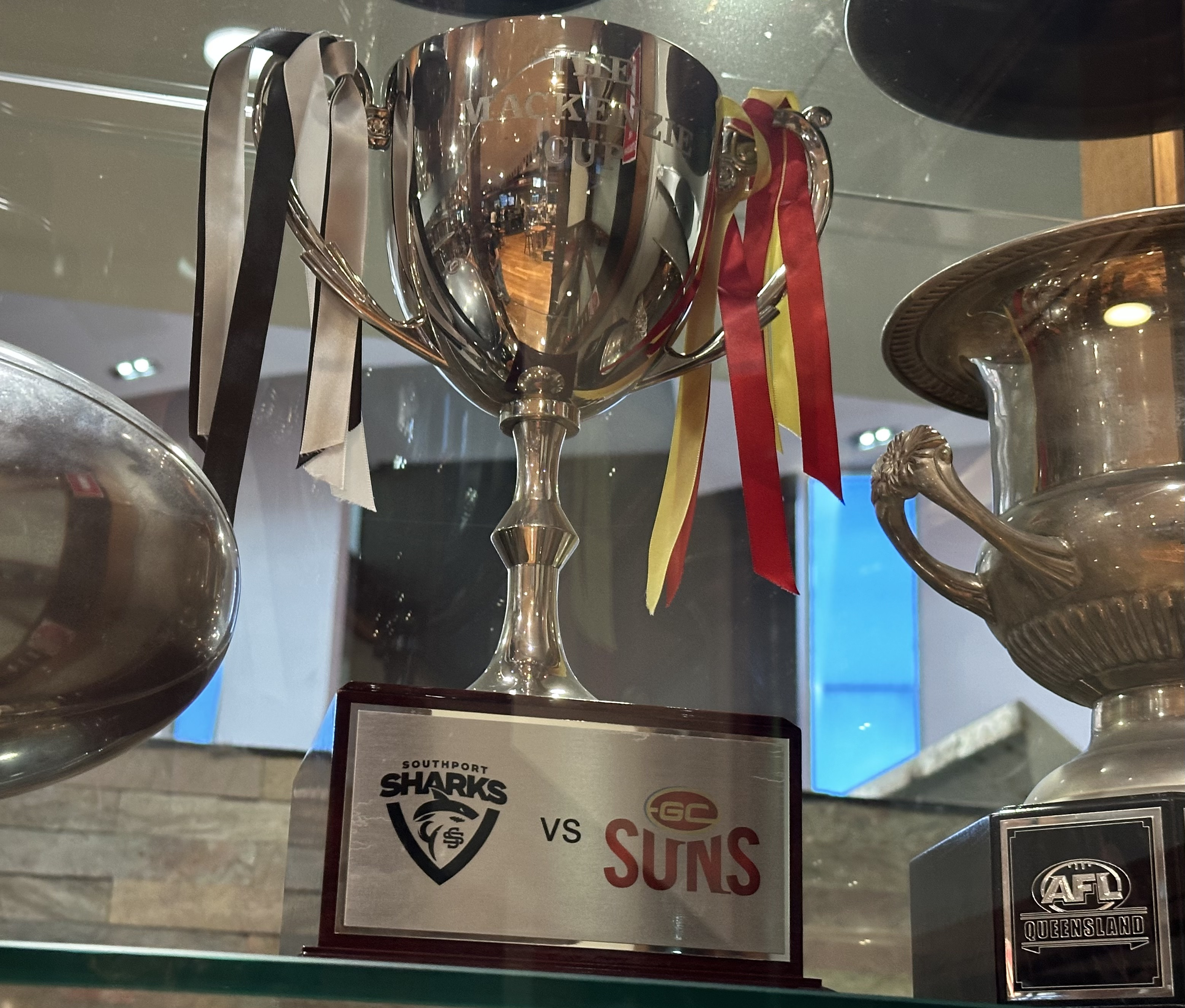
- The Doc Mackenzie Cup on display in 2026

- Southport Gold Coast
- First meeting: 28 May 2011 (Gold Coast 113−77 Southport)
- Latest meeting: 4 April 2026 (Southport 145−69 Gold Coast)
- Trophy: Doc Mackenzie Cup

Statistics
- Total meetings: 22
- All-time series: Gold Coast: 14 wins Southport: 7 wins

The Coast Clash is an Australian rules football rivalry, contested by the Southport Sharks and the Gold Coast Suns (Note: The Gold Coast Suns compete in the Australian Football League (AFL) at a senior level, with its reserves team in the VFL (and formerly the NEAFL).) in the Victorian Football League (VFL). The clubs, which are both based on the Gold Coast in Queensland, first played each other in a senior match in the North East Australian Football League (NEAFL) during the 2011 season. After the NEAFL disbanded in 2020, both clubs moved to the VFL.

Since September 2022, Gold Coast and Southport have played for the Doc Mackenzie Cup, named after Alan "Doc" Mackenzie (1946–2022), who served as Southport's president and a member of Gold Coast's board.

As of May 2026, Gold Coast has won 14 matches of the 22 matches played. Since both clubs joined the VFL in 2021, Southport has been more successful, winning five Coast Clash matches to Gold Coast's two.

== Notable matches ==
=== Abandoned 2021 match ===
In round 11 of the 2021 VFL season, the second Coast Clash of the year was scheduled to take place on 26 June 2021. However, the match was postponed because of COVID-19 border restrictions implemented by the Queensland Government for people travelling from Greater Sydney, with Gold Coast having played Sydney at Tramway Oval two weeks earlier.

The match was rescheduled to take play on 31 July 2021 at Carrara Training Oval. Half an hour before the match begun, the Queensland Government announced a snap lockdown affecting south-eastern Queensland, which would begin at 4pm the same day. The match begun as scheduled at 10:30am, with Jacob Townsend kicking the first goal for Gold Coast followed by Southport's Kwabey Boakye levelling the scores, before Jed Foggo kicked two behinds for the Suns.

After ten minutes of play, all players were ordered off the field and the match was abandoned for no result. Although the match was officially declared abandoned, the finishing scores were 1.2 (8) to 1.0 (6).

The match was rescheduled to be held in round 18, but the VFL season was curtailed on 1 September 2021.

== Results ==
#	Year	League	Rd	Home		Away		Ground	Date	Winner	M	H2H	Ref
#	Year	League	Rd	Team	Score	Team	Score	Ground	Date	Winner	M	H2H	Ref
1	2011	NEAFL	9	Gold Coast	18.5 (113)	Southport	11.11 (77)	Sir Bruce Small Park	28 May	GCS	36	+1	
2	2011	NEAFL	14	Southport	9.6 (60)	Gold Coast	24.11 (125)	Fankhauser Reserve	2 Jul	GCS	95	+2	
3	2012	NEAFL	2	Southport	10.5 (65)	Gold Coast	19.17 (131)	Fankhauser Reserve	31 Mar	GCS	66	+3	
4	2013	NEAFL	7	Gold Coast	16.10 (106)	Southport	11.11 (77)	Carrara Stadium	4 May	GCS	29	+4	
5	2014	NEAFL	1	Southport	12.16 (88)	Gold Coast	9.4 (58)	Fankhauser Reserve	29 Mar	SOU	30	+3	
6	2014	NEAFL	14	Gold Coast	4.6 (30)	Southport	25.15 (165)	Carrara Stadium	5 Jul	SOU	135	+2	
7	2015	NEAFL	5	Gold Coast	17.16 (118)	Southport	16.8 (104)	Carrara Stadium	9 May	GCS	14	+3	
8	2015	NEAFL	14	Southport	13.10 (88)	Gold Coast	18.10 (118)	Fankhauser Reserve	11 Jul	GCS	30	+4	
9	2016	NEAFL	14	Gold Coast	14.11 (95)	Southport	9.8 (62)	Carrara Stadium	2 Jul	GCS	33	+5	
10	2016	NEAFL	20	Southport	11.6 (72)	Gold Coast	13.7 (85)	Fankhauser Reserve	14 Aug	GCS	13	+6	
11	2017	NEAFL	10	Gold Coast	23.18 (156)	Southport	6.3 (39)	Carrara Stadium	3 Jun	GCS	117	+7	
12	2017	NEAFL	17	Southport	6.4 (40)	Gold Coast	14.14 (98)	Fankhauser Reserve	22 Jul	GCS	58	+8	
13	2018	NEAFL	9	Southport	12.7 (79)	Gold Coast	14.9 (93)	Fankhauser Reserve	2 Jun	GCS	14	+9	
14	2019	NEAFL	11	Southport	9.9 (63)	Gold Coast	12.6 (78)	Fankhauser Reserve	15 Jun	GCS	15	+10	
—	2020	NEAFL	3	Gold Coast	—	Southport	—	Carrara Stadium	2 May	—	—	—	
—	2020	NEAFL	11	Southport	—	Gold Coast	—	Fankhauser Reserve	13 Jun	—	—	—	
15	2021	VFL	6	Southport	17.14 (116)	Gold Coast	5.3 (33)	Fankhauser Reserve	21 May	SOU	83	+9	
16	2021	VFL	16	Gold Coast	1.2 (8)	Southport	1.0 (6)	Carrara Training Oval	31 Jul	ABAN	—	+9	
17	2022	VFL	21	Gold Coast	14.10 (94)	Southport	12.13 (85)	Carrara Stadium	13 Aug	GCS	9	+10	
18	2022	VFL	PF	Southport	14.25 (109)	Gold Coast	13.3 (81)	Fankhauser Reserve	11 Sep	SOU	28	+9	
19	2023	VFL	8	Southport	10.14 (74)	Gold Coast	12.4 (76)	Fankhauser Reserve	13 May	GCS	2	+10	
20	2024	VFL	7	Gold Coast	8.10 (58)	Southport	16.9 (105)	Carrara Stadium	12 May	SOU	47	+9	
21	2025	VFL	4	Southport	16.15 (111)	Gold Coast	8.8 (56)	Fankhauser Reserve	19 Apr	SOU	55	+8	
22	2026	VFL	3	Southport	22.13 (145)	Gold Coast	10.9 (69)	Fankhauser Reserve	4 Apr	SOU	76	+7	

=== Practice matches ===
Before entering the TAC Cup, Gold Coast played its first competitive match on 20 March 2009 against Southport – who were playing in the Queensland Australian Football League (QAFL) at the time – at Carrara Stadium.

#	Year	League	Home		Away		Ground	Date	Winner	M	Ref
#	Year	League	Team	Score	Team	Score	Ground	Date	Winner	M	Ref
1	2009	—	Southport	6.3 (39)	Gold Coast	3.5 (23)	Carrara Stadium	20 Mar	SOU	16	
2	2015	NEAFL	Gold Coast	18.15 (123)	Southport	2.2 (14)	Carrara Stadium	14 Mar	GCS	109	
3	2016	NEAFL	Gold Coast	9.8 (62)	Southport	11.13 (79)	Carrara Stadium	12 Mar	GCS	17	
4	2021	VFL	Gold Coast	15.3 (93)	Southport	6.11 (47)	Carrara Stadium	27 Mar	GCS	46	
5	2024	VFL	Gold Coast	11.4 (70)	Southport	14.6 (90)	Carrara Training Oval	1 Mar	SOU	20	
6	2026	VFL	Gold Coast	13.8 (86)	Southport	7.3 (45)	Carrara Training Oval	6 Mar	GCS	41	

== Records ==
=== Highest scores ===
#	Score	Club	Game
1	25.15 (165)	Southport	Round 14, 2014 (NEAFL) at Carrara Stadium
2	23.18 (156)	Gold Coast	Round 10, 2017 (NEAFL) at Carrara Stadium
3	22.13 (145)	Southport	Round 3, 2026 (VFL) at Fankhauser Reserve
4	19.17 (131)	Gold Coast	Round 2, 2012 (NEAFL) at Fankhauser Reserve
5	24.11 (125)	Gold Coast	Round 14, 2011 (NEAFL) at Fankhauser Reserve

=== Lowest scores ===
#	Score	Club	Game
—	1.0 (6)	Southport	Round 16, 2021 (VFL) at Carrara Training Oval
—	1.2 (8)	Gold Coast	Round 16, 2021 (VFL) at Carrara Training Oval
3	4.6 (30)	Gold Coast	Round 14, 2014 (NEAFL) at Carrara Stadium
4	5.3 (33)	Southport	Round 6, 2021 (VFL) at Fankhauser Reserve
5	6.3 (39)	Southport	Round 10, 2017 (NEAFL) at Carrara Stadium

== Shared history ==
Steve Daniel, who served as Gold Coast's NEAFL coach in 2016 and 2017, moved to Southport for the 2018 season and remained its head coach until the end of 2024.

=== Multi-club players ===
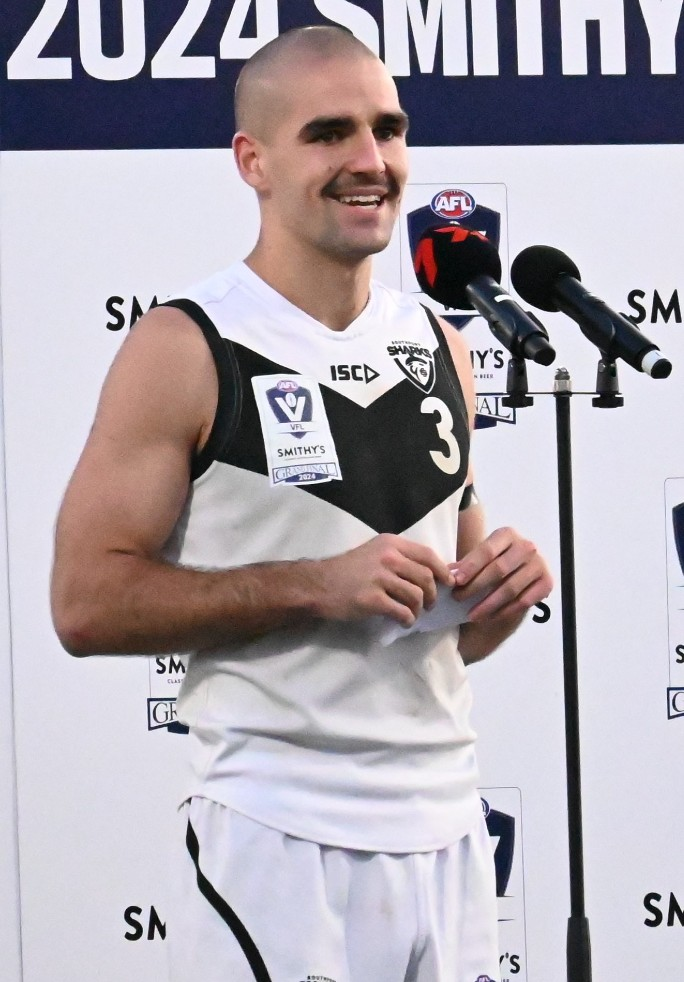
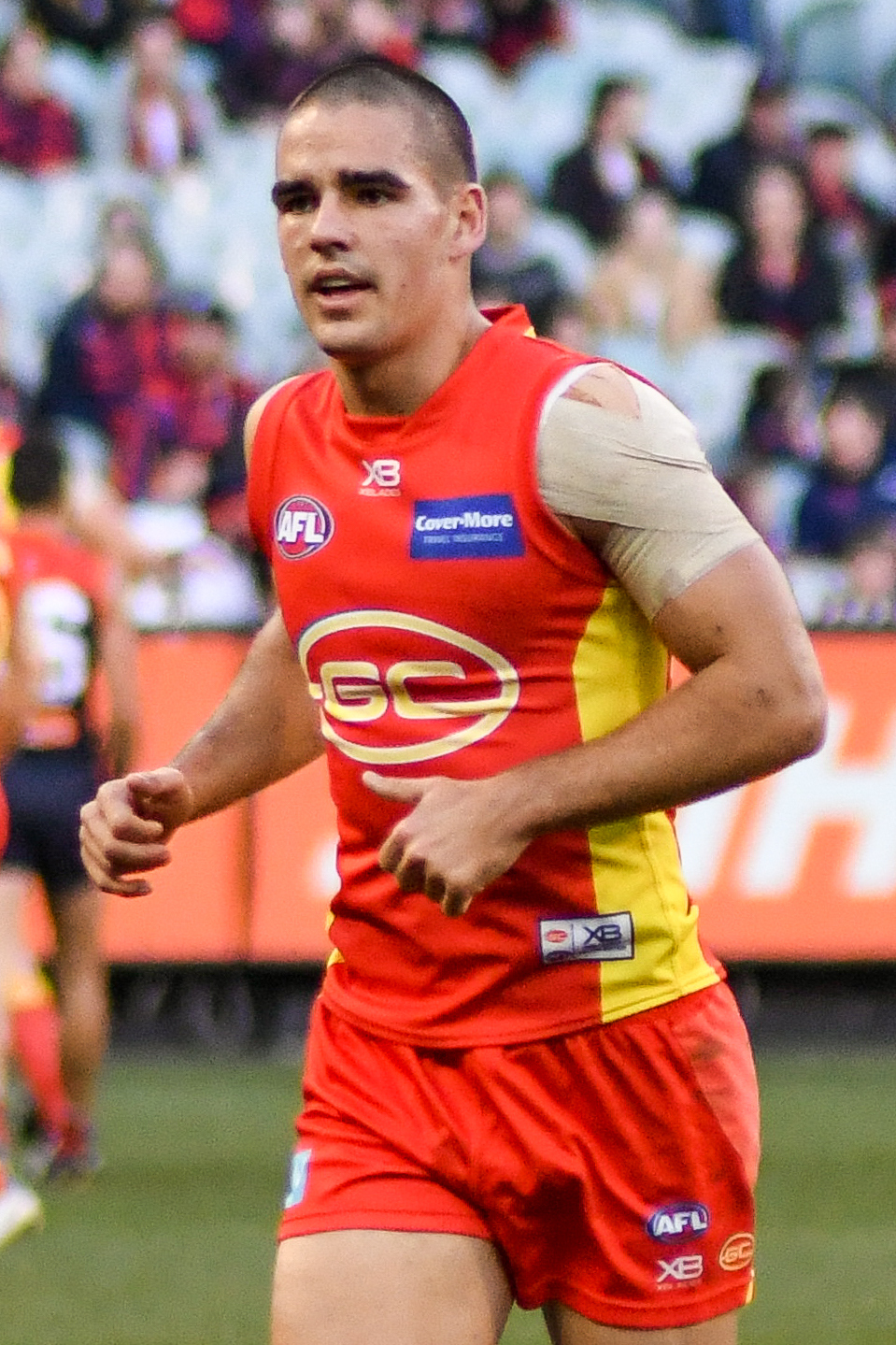
Jacob Dawson was an AFL-listed Gold Coast player from 2018 until the end of 2020, when he was delisted and joined Southport in the VFL for the 2021 season.

This list includes players who have been listed for Gold Coast in the AFL and the NEAFL.

Player	Years at GCS	Years at SOU	Ref
Andrew Boston	2013–2015	2016–2021	
Brayden Crossley	2018–2019	2016; 2021–	
Jacob Dawson	2018–2020	2021–	
Ryan Davis	2016–2017	2018–2019	
Sam Day	2011–2024	2026–	
Ben Jepson	2025–	2024	
Hewago Oea	2019–2024	2025–	
Andrew Raines	2015	2003	
Seb Tape	2011–2016	2017–2022	
Joel Tippett	2011	2006; 2010	
Lachie Weller	2018–	2014	

== See also ==
- QClash
- Rivalries in the Victorian Football League
