= Steve Daniel =

Australian rules football coach (born 1967/1968)

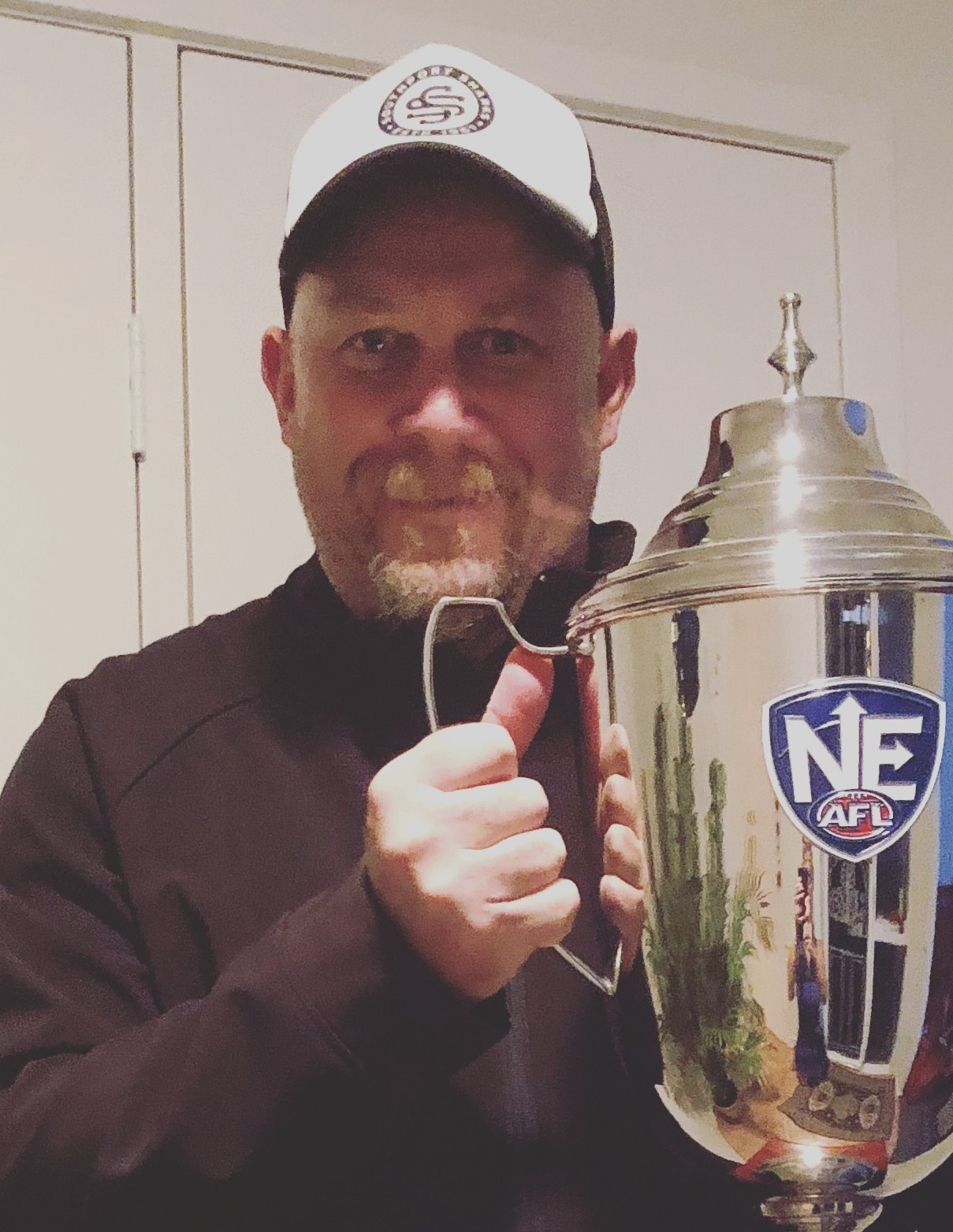
- Daniel in October 2018

Personal information
- Full name: Stephen Daniel
- Nickname: SJ
- Born: 1967 or 1968 (age 58–59)
- Original team: Mount Waverley

Coaching career^{3}
Years	Club	Games (W–L–D)
1990s	Mount Waverley	
1990s–1999	Surrey Park	
2004–2006	Seymour	
2007–2009	South Cairns	
2010	Congupna	18 (5–13–0)
2011–2012	Tatura	40 (29–9–2)
2014–2015	Labrador	42 (33–9–0)
2016–2017	Gold Coast	39 (19–20–0)
2018–2024	Southport	111 (75–36–0) (Note: This does not include the match between Gold Coast and Southport in round 16 of the 2021 VFL season, which was abandoned for no result after ten minutes of play because of the announcement of a snap COVID-19 lockdown.)
2027–	Labrador	0 (0–0–0)
- ^{3} Coaching statistics correct as of 2026.

Career highlights
- AFL Queensland Coach of the Year: 2008; NEAFL Coach of the Year: 2018; 3x GVL premiership coach: 2005, 2006, 2012; QAFL premiership coach: 2015; NEAFL premiership coach: 2018

Stephen Daniel (born 1967 or 1968) is an Australian rules football coach who currently serves as the head coach of Labrador in the Queensland Australian Football League (QAFL).

Daniel is a multi-premiership-winning coach, with thirteen grand final appearances across multiple teams and competitions in Victoria and Queensland.

== Career ==
Daniel began coaching in Victoria after his playing career at Mount Waverley was ended in 1989 because of a severe car accident, which resulted in him suffering a broken back, neck and legs. After recovering from his injuries, he replaced Doug Searl as Mount Waverley's senior coach. Two years later, he moved to Surrey Park and coached the side to two grand final appearances.

In 2000, Daniel joined the Northern Bullants in the Victorian Football League (VFL) as an assistant to head coach Mark Williams. The Bullants were competing as a standalone team until the 2003 season, when it entered into a reserves affiliation with Carlton. Williams described Daniel as having "really helped keep the place together" during a period when the Bullants did not win many matches. Daniel joined the Seymour Football Club in the Goulburn Valley League (GVL) for the 2004 season, coaching the team to back-to-back senior premierships in 2005 and 2006.

Daniel moved to Queensland in 2007 to become the head coach of the South Cairns Cutters in the AFL Cairns competition. The following year, he coached the Queensland Country representative team to victory in Division 2 of the Australian Country Football Championships and was subsequently named the AFL Queensland Coach of the Year for 2008. South Cairns lost the 2008 and 2009 grand finals to the Cairns Saints.

In 2010, Daniel returned to Victoria for family reasons and spent one season coaching Congupna in the Murray Football League (MFL). He was criticised by Shepparton coach Richard Warburton for attempting recruiting two players who were contracted to Shepparton. Daniel returned to the GVL for the 2011 season with the Tatura Football Club and won the grand final the following year against his former club, Seymour. He later described the 2012 GVL grand final as "one of my hardest days in football", saying he "[calls] Seymour my club". Daniel left Tatura before the start of the 2013 season and was succeeded by Scott Grigg.

On 31 July 2013, the Labrador Tigers announced Daniel would serve as the club's senior coach in the North East Australian Football League (NEAFL) from the 2014 season. However, Labrador's NEAFL license was revoked the following month as part of a restructure of the competition, with the club returning to the Queensland Australian Football League (QAFL). This did not prevent Daniel coaching Labrador, with the club finishing runners-up in the QAFL in 2014 before winning the 2015 grand final to break a 21-year senior premiership drought.

Following Labrador's QAFL premiership, Daniel was signed by the Gold Coast Suns as the club's NEAFL coach. The Suns finished sixth on the ladder in 2016 and fourth in 2017, when it reached a preliminary final for the first time. He left the Suns at the end of the year to become the head coach of the Southport Sharks, which had recorded its worst NEAFL position in 2017 after finishing ninth out of ten clubs.

With Daniel as head coach, Southport's playing list underwent significant changes to include twenty-five new players for the 2018 season. The Sharks claimed the minor premiership at the end of the home-and-away season and faced Sydney in the grand final at Fankhauser Reserve, winning by 55 points to claim its first NEAFL premiership and twenty-second senior men's premiership. Southport finished runners-up in 2019.

After the NEAFL disbanded in 2020, Southport joined the VFL. Under Daniel, the club finished second on the ladder in 2021 before the season was curtailed due to the impact of the COVID-19 pandemic. He received a two-year contract extension in September 2021 and coached the Sharks to the 2022 VFL Grand Final, where they were defeated by Casey. Daniel served as an assistant coach for the VFL's representative team against the South Australian National Football League (SANFL) in April 2024.

On 8 August 2024, Southport announced that Daniel would step down as head coach at the end of the 2024 VFL season and be replaced by Matthew Primus. The Sharks qualified for the 2024 grand final from fifth place, but were narrowly defeated by Werribee. Overall, Daniel had a win–loss record (including finals) of 67.6% throughout his eight seasons at the Sharks.

Daniel coached the Queensland Country men's team in a representative match against a combined AFL Sydney/Canberra team on 11 July 2026. In September 2026, Labrador announced Daniel would return to the club as head coach for the 2027 QAFL season.

== Statistics ==
=== Coaching statistics ===
Legend
W	Wins	L	Losses	D	Draws	W%	Winning percentage	LP	Ladder position	LT	League teams

Season	Team	League	Games	W	L	D	W %	Ladder
2009	South Cairns	AFL Cairns	20	18	2	0	90.0%	1 / 7
2010	Congupna	MFL	18	5	13	0	27.8%	9 / 13
2011	Tatura	GVL	19	10	7	2	52.6%	6 / 12
2012	Tatura	GVL	21	19	2	0	90.5%	1 / 12
2014	Labrador	QAFL	22	15	7	0	68.2%	3 / 10
2015	Labrador	QAFL	20	18	2	0	90.0%	1 / 10
2016	Gold Coast	NEAFL	19	9	10	0	47.4%	6 / 10
2017	Gold Coast	NEAFL	20	11	9	0	55.0%	4 / 10
2018	Southport	NEAFL	20	14	6	0	70.0%	2 / 10
2019	Southport	NEAFL	20	14	6	0	70.0%	2 / 10
2020	Southport	NEAFL	—	—	—	—	—	—
2021	Southport	VFL	10	9	1	0	90.0%	2 / 22
2022	Southport	VFL	21	15	6	0	71.4%	3 / 21
2023	Southport	VFL	18	8	10	0	44.4%	14 / 21
2024	Southport	VFL	22	15	7	0	68.2%	5 / 21
2027	Labrador	QAFL	0	0	0	0	—	—
