= List of NEAFL records =

This is a list of records from the North East Australian Football League from its inception in 2011 until it disbanded in 2020.

== Club records ==
=== Premierships ===
Titles	Club	Seasons
4	Brisbane reserves	2012, 2013, 2017, 2019
2	NT Thunder	2011, 2015
1	Southport	2018
1	UWS Giants	2016
1	Aspley	2014

=== Highest scores ===
Rank	Score	Club	Opponent	Year	Round	Venue
1	33.18 (216)	UWS Giants	Brisbane reserves	2015	9	Sydney Showground
2	32.18 (210)	UWS Giants	Gold Coast reserves	2014	9	Carrara Stadium
3	30.17 (197)	UWS Giants	Sydney reserves	2015	13	Blacktown Sportspark
4	28.19 (187)	Canberra	NT Thunder	2019	16	Manuka Oval
5	28.17 (185)	Sydney reserves	WSU Giants	2017	11	Henson Park

=== Lowest scores ===
Rank	Score	Club	Opponent	Year	Round	Venue
1	0.2 (2)	Eastlake	Aspley	2014	20	Graham Road Oval
2	0.4 (4)	Gold Coast reserves	Brisbane reserves	2018	6	Moreton Bay
3	0.8 (8)	Aspley	Southport	2016	10	Fankhauser Reserve
4	1.7 (13)	Sydney University	Aspley	2018	10	Fankhauser Reserve
5	2.2 (14)	WSU Giants	Sydney reserves	2017	11	Henson Park

== Individual records ==
=== Most career games ===
Rank	Games	Player	Club(s)	Career span
1	166	Gavin Grose	Mount Gravatt, Aspley	2011–2019
2	159	Reece Toye	Aspley	2011–2019
3	157	Aaron Bruce	Canberra	2011–2019
4	156	Cameron Ilett	NT Thunder	2011–2018
5	154	Darren Ewing	NT Thunder	2011–2018

=== Most disposals in a game ===
Rank	Player	Disposals	Year vs Team
1	Tom Mitchell	64	2018 vs Eastlake
