= 2015 NEAFL season =

5th season of the North East Australian Football League

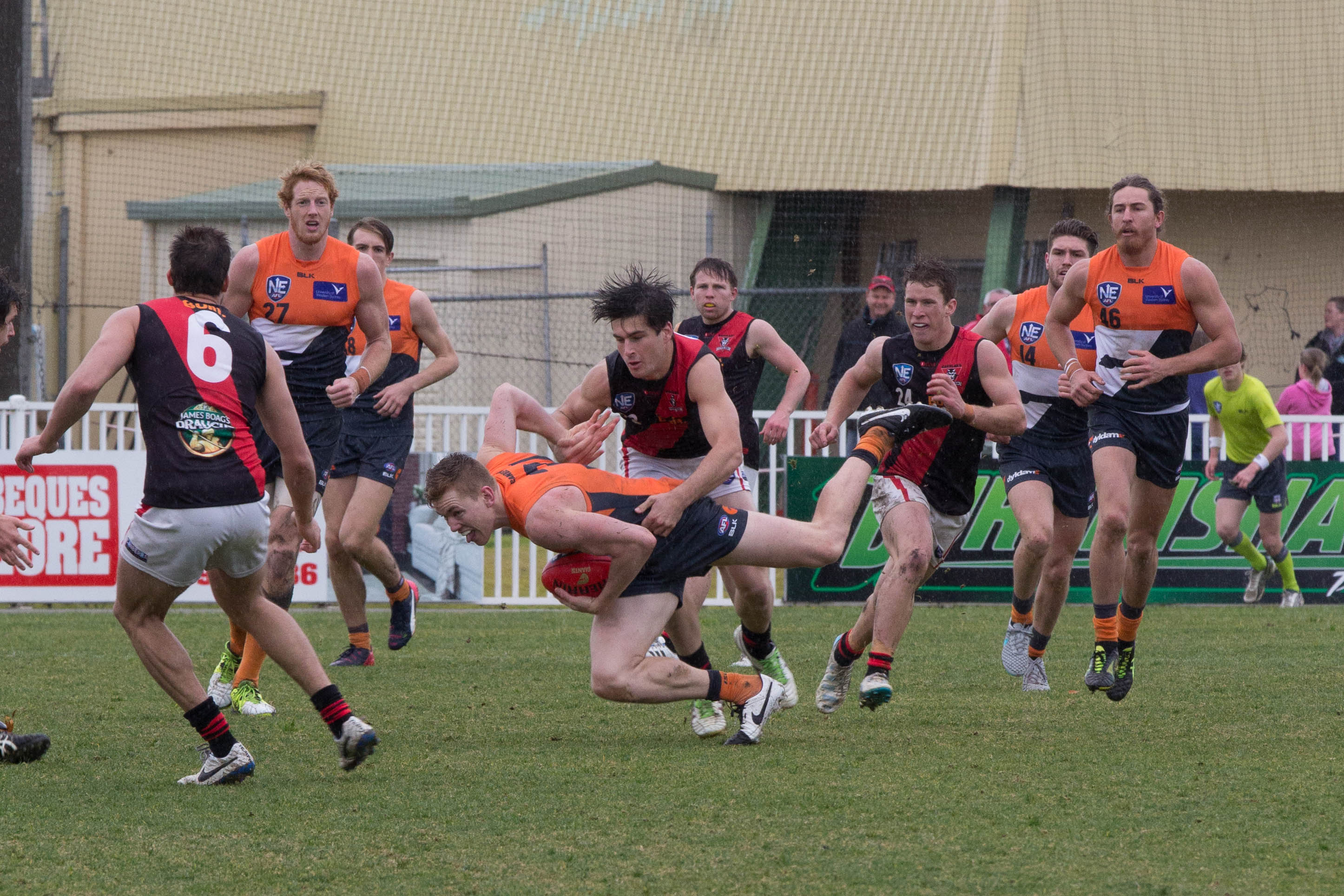
- UWS Giants and Eastlake playing in round 17

Overview
- Teams: 11
- Premiers: NT Thunder; 2nd premiership
- Minor premiers: UWS Giants; 2nd minor premiership
- NEAFL MVP: Tom Young (Sydney University – 86 votes)
- Leading goalkicker: Darren Ewing (NT Thunder – 78 goals)

Attendance
- Matches played: 104

The 2015 NEAFL season was the fifth season of the North East Australian Football League (NEAFL). The season began on Saturday, 11 April and concluded on Saturday, 19 September with the NEAFL Grand Final. NT Thunder were the premiers, defeating Aspley by one point in the Grand Final.

== League structure ==
The structure of the league follows on from 2014 with a single conference involving the three eastern states/territories (Australian Capital Territory, Queensland, and New South Wales) and the Northern Territory. Three clubs decided not to renew their licenses due to financial complications, including Canberra-based clubs, Belconnen and Queanbeyan, and Sydney-based club, Sydney Hills.

== Participating clubs ==
2015 NEAFL participating clubs
Club	Location	Home ground
Ainslie	Canberra, ACT	Alan Ray Oval
Aspley	Brisbane, QLD	Graham Road
Brisbane	Brisbane, QLD	Giffin Park
Eastlake	Canberra, ACT	StarTrack Oval
Gold Coast	Gold Coast, QLD	Metricon Stadium
NT Thunder	Darwin, NT	TIO Stadium
Redland	Brisbane, QLD	Tidbold Park
Southport	Gold Coast, QLD	Fankhauser Reserve
Sydney	Sydney, NSW	Sydney Cricket Ground
Sydney University	Sydney, NSW	Henson Park
UWS Giants	Sydney, NSW	Spotless Stadium

== Premiership season ==
All starting times are local.

=== Round 1 ===
	Round 1
Saturday, 11 April (11:15 am)	UWS Giants 17.18 (120)	def.	Gold Coast 14.5 (89)	Blacktown International Sportspark
Saturday, 11 April (11:30 am)	Ainslie 6.15 (51)	def. by	Sydney 16.12 (108)	Alan Ray Oval
Saturday, 11 April (11:45 am)	Southport 14.14 (98)	def.	Brisbane 13.12 (90)	Salk Oval
Saturday, 11 April (1:00 pm)	Aspley 24.23 (167)	def.	Eastlake 4.4 (28)	Graham Road
Saturday, 11 April (2:00 pm)	Sydney University 9.15 (69)	def. by	Redland 11.10 (76)	Henson Park
	Bye; NT Thunder

=== Round 2 ===
	Round 2
Saturday, 18 April (10:30 am)	Sydney 9.4 (54)	def. by	UWS Giants 12.19 (121)	SCG
Saturday, 18 April (1:30 pm)	Redland 9.14 (68)	def. by	Brisbane 11.13 (79)	Tidbold Park
Saturday, 18 April (2:00 pm)	Ainslie 27.17 (179)	def.	Eastlake 8.8 (56)	Alan Ray Oval
Saturday, 18 April (6:30 pm)	NT Thunder 17.14 (116)	def.	Southport 16.11 (107)	TIO Stadium
Sunday, 19 April (1:30 pm)	Aspley 18.11 (119)	def.	Gold Coast 16.9 (105)	Graham Road
	Bye; Sydney University

=== Round 3 ===
	Round 3
Saturday, 25 April (12:00 pm)	Brisbane 13.17 (95)	def. by	Ainslie 16.6 (102)	Giffin Park
Saturday, 25 April (12:00 pm)	Aspley 16.9 (105)	def.	Sydney University 15.12 (102)	Graham Road
Saturday, 25 April (12:00 pm)	Gold Coast 5.12 (42)	def. by	Sydney 16.14 (110)	Harrup Park
Saturday, 25 April (1:00 pm)	Eastlake 8.8 (56)	def. by	UWS Giants 19.18 (132)	StarTrack Oval
Saturday, 25 April (2:00 pm)	Redland 13.11 (89)	def. by	NT Thunder 13.13.91	Tidbold Park
	Bye; Southport

=== Round 4 ===
	Round 4
Saturday, 2 May (12:00 pm)	Southport 17.13 (115)	def.	Redland 4.10 (34)	Fankhauser Reserve
Saturday, 2 May (12:00 pm)	Eastlake 12.8 (80)	def. by	Aspley 15.12 (102)	StarTrack Oval
Saturday, 2 May (5:10 pm)	Sydney University 3.10 (28)	def. by	Sydney 10.9 (69)	SCG
Saturday, 2 May (6:30 pm)	NT Thunder 14.10 (94)	def.	UWS Giants 12.12 (84)	TIO Stadium
Saturday, 2 May (8.15 pm)	Gold Coast 10.14 (74)	def.	Brisbane 6.13 (49)	Metricon Stadium
	Bye; Ainslie

=== Round 5 ===
	Round 5
Saturday, 9 May (12:00 pm)	Sydney University 14.12 (96)	def.	Ainslie 12.14 (86)	Henson Park
Saturday, 9 May (12:55 pm)	UWS Giants 12.16 (88)	def.	Sydney 12.9 (81)	Spotless Stadium
Saturday, 9 May (1:30 pm)	Aspley 11.19 (85)	def. by	NT Thunder 15.8 (98)	Graham Road
Saturday, 9 May (1:30 pm)	Gold Coast 17.16 (118)	def.	Southport 16.8 (104)	Metricon Stadium
	Bye; Redland, Brisbane, Eastlake

=== Round 6 ===
	Round 6
Saturday, 16 May (11:30 am)	Eastlake 9.14 (68)	def. by	Redland 11.12 (78)	StarTrack Oval
Saturday, 16 May (12:00 pm)	Ainslie 8.6 (54)	def. by	Aspley 15.10 (100)	Alan Ray Oval
Saturday, 16 May (2:20 pm)	Sydney 14.13 (97)	def.	Southport 6.9 (45)	ANZ Stadium
Saturday, 16 May (6:30 pm)	NT Thunder 12.7 (79)	def. by	Sydney University 13.12 (90)	TIO Stadium
Sunday, 17 May (12:00 pm)	Brisbane 10.3 (63)	def. by	UWS Giants 15.11 (101)	Giffin Park
	Bye; Gold Coast

=== Round 7 ===
	Round 7
Saturday, 23 May (10:30 am)	UWS Giants 18.14 (122)	def.	Gold Coast 15.16 (106)	Spotless Stadium
Saturday, 23 May (11:00 am)	Sydney University 12.23 (95)	def.	Eastlake 7.9 (51)	Henson Park
Saturday, 23 May (12:00 pm)	Southport 11.6 (72)	def.	NT Thunder 9.13 (67)	Fankhauser Reserve
Saturday, 23 May (12:00 pm)	Redland 13.10 (88)	def. by	Ainslie 14.8 (92)	Tidbold Park
Saturday, 23 May (1:30 pm)	Aspley 13.14 (92)	def.	Brisbane 9.6 (60)	Graham Road
	Bye; Sydney

=== Round 8 ===
	Round 8
Saturday, 30 May (12:00 pm)	Sydney 16.14 (110)	def.	Brisbane 5.6 (36)	Newcastle Oval
Saturday, 30 May (1:30 pm)	Redland 7.12 (54)	def. by	Aspley 11.12 (78)	Tidbold Park
Saturday, 30 May (2:00 pm)	Ainslie 20.13 (133)	def.	Eastlake 8.12 (60)	Alan Ray Oval
Saturday, 30 May (2:00 pm)	Sydney University 17.10 (112)	def.	Southport 7.12 (54)	Henson Park
Saturday, 30 May (6:30 pm)	NT Thunder 15.17 (107)	def.	Gold Coast 4.9 (33)	TIO Stadium
	Bye; UWS Giants

=== Round 9 ===
	Round 9
Saturday, 6 June (12:00 pm)	Gold Coast 7.17 (59)	def. by	Sydney 12.17 (89)	Metricon Stadium
Sunday, 7 June (9:30 am)	UWS Giants 33.18 (216)	def.	Brisbane 3.6 (24)	Spotless Stadium
	Bye; Ainslie, Aspley, Eastlake, NT Thunder, Redland, Southport, Sydney University

=== Round 10 ===
	Round 10
Saturday, 13 June (12:00 pm)	Sydney University 22.14 (146)	def.	Ainslie 7.9 (51)	Henson Park
Saturday, 13 June (12:00 pm)	Eastlake 5.6 (36)	def. by	Sydney 14.17 (101)	StarTrack Oval
Saturday, 13 June (6:30 pm)	NT Thunder 14.14 (98)	def. by	Aspley 15.11 (101)	TIO Stadium
Sunday, 14 June (12:00 pm)	Southport 9.5 (59)	def. by	UWS Giants 12.15 (87)	Fankhauser Reserve
Sunday, 14 June (1:30 pm)	Redland 14.18 (102)	def.	Gold Coast 8.8 (56)	Tidbold Park
	Bye; Brisbane

=== Round 11 ===
	Round 11
Saturday, 20 June (12:00 pm)	Ainslie 11.4 (70)	def. by	UWS Giants 19.21 (135)	Alan Ray Oval
Saturday, 20 June (12:00 pm)	Eastlake 11.4 (70)	def.	Brisbane 8.12 (60)	StarTrack Oval
Saturday, 20 June (1:30 pm)	Sydney University 13.12 (90)	def. by	NT Thunder 15.8 (98)	Henson Park
Saturday, 20 June (3:00 pm)	Southport 9.9 (63)	def. by	Redland 11.5 (71)	Fankhauser Reserve
	Bye; Aspley, Gold Coast, Sydney

=== Round 12 ===
	Round 12
Friday, 26 June (4:10 pm)	Sydney 5.11 (41)	def. by	Sydney University 18.8 (116)	SCG
Saturday, 27 June (12:00 pm)	Ainslie 8.10 (58)	def. by	Redland 12.19 (91)	Alan Ray Oval
Saturday, 27 June (12:00 pm)	Brisbane 14.10 (94)	def. by	Gold Coast 18.10 (118)	Giffin Park
Saturday, 27 June (1:30 pm)	Aspley 19.9 (123)	def.	Southport 11.9 (75)	Graham Road
Saturday, 27 June (6:30 pm)	NT Thunder 19.16 (130)	def.	Eastlake 9.9 (63)	TIO Stadium
	Bye; UWS Giants

=== Round 13 ===
	Round 13
Saturday, 4 July (10:45 am)	Sydney University 6.16 (52)	def. by	Gold Coast 10.7 (67)	Blacktown International Sportspark
Saturday, 4 July (1:30 pm)	Redland 5.10 (40)	def. by	Aspley 17.11 (113)	Tidbold Park
Saturday, 4 July (2:00 pm)	Sydney 2.2 (14)	def. by	UWS Giants 30.17 (197)	Blacktown International Sportspark
Saturday, 4 July (2:15 pm)	Eastlake 11.12 (78)	drew with	Ainslie 11.12 (78)	StarTrack Oval
Saturday, 4 July (3:30 pm)	NT Thunder 18.9 (117)	def.	Brisbane 10.9 (69)	TIO Stadium
	Bye; Southport

=== Round 14 ===
	Round 14
Saturday, 11 July (12:00 pm)	Eastlake 7.7 (49)	def. by	Sydney University 16.16 (112)	StarTrack Oval
Saturday, 11 July (1:30 pm)	Southport 13.10 (88)	def. by	Gold Coast 18.10 (118)	Fankhauser Reserve
Saturday, 11 July (6:30 pm)	NT Thunder 14.19 (103)	def.	Ainslie 11.6 (72)	TIO Stadium
Sunday, 12 July (9:30 am)	UWS Giants 22.16 (148)	def.	Aspley 8.6 (54)	Spotless Stadium
Sunday, 12 July (12:00 pm)	Brisbane 8.5 (53)	def. by	Sydney 13.5 (83)	Giffin Park
	Bye; Redland

=== Round 15 ===
	Round 15
Saturday, 18 July (10:30 am)	Ainslie 11.10 (76)	def. by	Southport 19.13 (127)	Alan Ray Oval
Saturday, 18 July (10:30 am)	Gold Coast 3.10 (28)	def. by	UWS Giants 23.20 (158)	Metricon Stadium
Saturday, 18 July (1:30 pm)	Aspley 6.15 (51)	def. by	NT Thunder 10.8 (68)	Graham Road
Saturday, 18 July (3:00 pm)	Sydney 16.9 (105)	def.	Redland 7.8 (50)	ANZ Stadium
Sunday, 19 July (12:00 pm)	Sydney University 16.7 (103)	def.	Brisbane 8.12 (60)	Blacktown International Sportspark
	Bye; Eastlake

=== Round 16 ===
	Round 16
Saturday, 25 July (1:00 pm)	Redland 18.7 (115)	def.	Eastlake 8.10 (58)	Tidbold Park
Saturday, 25 July (1:30 pm)	Southport 9.9 (63)	def. by	Aspley 14.10 (94)	Fankhauser Reserve
Saturday, 25 July (3:10 pm)	Brisbane 11.4 (70)	def. by	UWS Giants 26.11 (167)	The Gabba
Saturday, 25 July (6:30 pm)	NT Thunder 15.7 (97)	def.	Sydney 6.8 (44)	TIO Stadium
	Bye; Sydney University, Gold Coast, Ainslie

=== Round 17 ===
	Round 17
Saturday, 1 August (12:00 pm)	Ainslie 8.7 (55)	def. by	Sydney University 13.19 (97)	Alan Ray Oval
Saturday, 1 August (12:00 pm)	UWS Giants 20.10 (130)	def.	Eastlake 5.7 (37)	Robertson Oval
Saturday, 1 August (12:55 pm)	Sydney 10.26 (86)	def.	Brisbane 5.11 (41)	SCG
Saturday, 1 August (1:30 pm)	Redland 16.5 (101)	def. by	Southport 19.9 (123)	Tidbold Park
Saturday, 1 August (3:00 pm)	Gold Coast 13.10 (88)	def. by	NT Thunder 14.13 (97)	Metricon Stadium
	Bye; Aspley

=== Round 18 ===
	Round 18
Saturday, 8 August (12:00 pm)	Brisbane 9.7 (61)	def. by	Gold Coast 23.12 (150)	Giffin Park
Saturday, 8 August (12:00 pm)	Sydney University 15.15 (105)	def.	Aspley 8.11 (59)	Henson Park
Saturday, 8 August (2:00 pm)	Eastlake 11.11 (77)	def. by	Ainslie 11.13 (79)	StarTrack Oval
Saturday, 8 August (7:30 pm)	NT Thunder 15.14 (104)	def.	Southport 13.8 (86)	TIO Traeger Park
Sunday, 9 August (11:40 am)	UWS Giants 25.12 (162)	def.	Redland 8.4 (52)	Spotless Stadium
	Bye; Sydney

=== Round 19 ===
	Round 19
Friday, 14 August (4:10 pm)	Sydney 10.7 (67)	def.	Gold Coast 8.8 (56)	SCG
Saturday, 15 August (12:00 pm)	Southport 17.17 (119)	def.	Ainslie 9.9 (63)	Fankhauser Reserve
Saturday, 15 August (12:00 pm)	Eastlake 11.10 (76)	def. by	Sydney University 20.14 (134)	StarTrack Oval
Saturday, 15 August (1:30 pm)	Aspley 12.8 (80)	def. by	Redland 13.10 (88)	Graham Road
Saturday, 15 August (3:10 pm)	Brisbane 12.14 (86)	def. by	NT Thunder 18.15 (123)	Gabba
	Bye; UWS Giants

=== Round 20 ===
	Round 20
Saturday, 22 August (10:20 am)	UWS Giants 16.26 (122)	def.	Sydney 6.6 (42)	Spotless Stadium
Saturday, 22 August (12:00 pm)	Ainslie 10.7 (67)	def. by	Aspley 16.9 (105)	Alan Ray Oval
Saturday, 22 August (12:00 pm)	Southport 16.15 (111)	def.	Sydney University 9.8 (62)	Fankhauser Reserve
Saturday, 22 August (12:55 pm)	Gold Coast 17.22 (124)	def.	Eastlake 5.9 (39)	Metricon Stadium
Saturday, 22 August (6:30 pm)	NT Thunder 16.17 (113)	def.	Redland 3.6 (24)	TIO Stadium
	Bye; Brisbane

=== Round 21 ===
	Round 21
Saturday, 29 August (10:05 am)	UWS Giants 10.16 (76)	def. by	Sydney University 16.13 (109)	Spotless Stadium
Saturday, 29 August (10:30 am)	Eastlake 7.7 (49)	def. by	Southport 23.13 (151)	StarTrack Oval
Saturday, 29 August (12:00 pm)	Ainslie 8.10 (58)	def. by	Gold Coast 22.10 (142)	Alan Ray Oval
Saturday, 29 August (12:00 pm)	Aspley 9.11 (65)	def. by	Sydney 12.13 (85)	Graham Road
Saturday, 29 August (1:30 pm)	Redland 12.18 (90)	def. by	Brisbane 15.7 (97)	Tidbold Park
	Bye; NT Thunder

== Win/Loss table ==
+	Win		Qualified for finals
-	Loss	X	Bye
	Draw		Eliminated

Bold – Home game
X – Bye
Opponent for round listed above margin
This table can be sorted by margin

Team	1	2	3	4	5	6	7	8	9	10	11	12	13	14	15	16	17	18	19	20	21	F1	F2	GF	Ladder
Ainslie	**Syd**; **57**	**EL**; **123**	Bri; 7	X	SydU; 10	**Asp**; **46**	Red; 4	**EL**; **73**	X	SydU; 95	**UWS**; **65**	**Red**; **33**	EL; 0	NT; 31	**SP**; **51**	X	**SydU**; **42**	EL; 2	SP; 56	**Asp**; **38**	GC; 84	X	X	X	9
Aspley	**EL**; **139**	**GC**; **14**	**SydU**; **3**	EL; 22	**NT**; **13**	Ain; 46	**Bri**; **32**	Red; 24	X	NT; 3	X	**SP**; **48**	Red; 73	UWS; 94	**NT**; **17**	SP; 31	X	SydU; 46	**Red**; **8**	Ain; 38	**Syd**; **20**	**Syd**; **7**	UWS; 89	NT; 1	**2**
Brisbane	SP; 8	Red; 11	**Ain**; **7**	GC; 25	X	**UWS**; **38**	Asp; 32	Syd; 74	UWS; 192	X	EL; 10	**GC**; **24**	NT; 48	**Syd**; **30**	SydU; 43	**UWS**; **97**	Syd; 45	**GC**; **89**	NT; 37	X	Red; 7	X	X	X	10
Eastlake	Asp; 139	Ain; 123	**UWS**; **76**	**Asp**; **22**	X	**Red**; **10**	SydU; 44	Ain; 73	X	**Syd**; **65**	**Bri**; **10**	NT; 67	**Ain**; **0**	**SydU**; **63**	X	Red; 57	UWS; 93	**Ain**; **2**	**SydU**; **58**	GC; 85	**SP**; **102**	X	X	X	11
Gold Coast	UWS; 31	Asp; 14	**Syd**; **68**	**Bri**; **25**	**SP**; **14**	X	UWS; 16	NT; 74	**Syd**; **30**	Red; 56	X	Bri; 24	SydU; 15	SP; 30	**UWS**; **130**	X	**NT**; **9**	Bri; 89	Syd; 11	**EL**; **85**	Ain; 84	X	X	X	7
NT Thunder	X	**SP**; **9**	Red; 2	**UWS**; **10**	Asp; 13	**SydU**; **11**	SP; 5	**GC**; **74**	X	**Asp**; **3**	SydU; 8	**EL**; **67**	**BL**; **48**	**Ain**; **31**	Asp; 17	**Syd**; **53**	GC; 9	**SP**; **18**	Bri; 37	**Red**; **89**	X	X	**SydU**; **70**	**Asp**; **1**	**1**
Redland	SydU; 7	**Bri**; **11**	**NT**; **2**	SP; 81	X	EL; 10	**Ain**; **4**	**Asp**; **24**	X	**GC**; **56**	SP; 8	Ain; 33	**Asp**; **73**	X	Syd; 55	**EL**; **57**	**SP**; **22**	UWS; 110	Asp; 8	NT; 89	**Bri**; **7**	X	X	X	8
Southport	**Bri**; **8**	NT; 9	X	**Red**; **81**	GC; 14	Syd; 52	**NT**; **5**	SydU; 58	X	**UWS**; **28**	**Red**; **8**	Asp; 48	X	**GC**; **30**	Ain; 51	**Asp**; **31**	Red; 22	NT; 18	**Ain**; **56**	**SydU**; **49**	EL; 102	SydU; 58	X	X	**6**
Sydney	Ain; 57	**UWS**; **63**	GC; 68	SydU; 41	UWS; 7	**SP**; **52**	X	**Bri**; **74**	GC; 30	EL; 65	X	**SydU**; **75**	**UWS**; **183**	Bri; 30	**Red**; **55**	NT; 53	**Bri**; **45**	X	**GC**; **11**	UWS; 80	Asp; 20	Asp; 7	X	X	**5**
Sydney University	**Red**; **7**	X	Asp; 3	**Syd**; **41**	**Ain**; **10**	NT; 11	**EL**; **44**	**SP**; **58**	X	**Ain**; **95**	**NT**; **8**	Syd; 75	**GC**; **15**	EL; 63	**Bri**; **43**	X	Ain; 42	**Asp**; **46**	EL; 58	SP; 49	UWS; 33	**SP**; **58**	NT; 70	X	**4**
UWS Giants	**GC**; **31**	Syd; 63	EL; 76	NT; 10	**Syd**; **7**	Bri; 38	**GC**; **16**	X	**Bri**; **192**	SP; 28	Ain; 65	X	Syd; 183	**Asp**; **94**	GC; 130	Bri; 97	**EL**; **93**	**Red**; **110**	X	**Syd**; **80**	**SydU**; **33**	X	**Asp**; **89**	X	**3**
Team	1	2	3	4	5	6	7	8	9	10	11	12	13	14	15	16	17	18	19	20	21	F1	F2	GF	Ladder

== Ladder ==
2015 NEAFL Ladder
Pos	Team	Pld	W	L	D	PF	PA	PP	Pts
1	UWS Giants	18	16	2	0	2366	1106	213.9	64
2	NT Thunder (P)	18	15	3	0	1800	1334	134.9	60
3	Sydney University	18	12	6	0	1718	1263	136.0	48
4	Aspley	18	12	6	0	1695	1420	119.4	48
5	Sydney	18	12	6	0	1390	1303	106.7	48
6	Southport	18	8	10	0	1660	1582	104.9	32
7	Gold Coast	18	8	10	0	1573	1636	96.1	32
8	Redland	18	7	11	0	1311	1620	80.9	28
9	Ainslie	18	5	12	1	1426	1823	78.2	22
10	Brisbane	18	2	16	0	1187	1970	60.3	8
11	Eastlake	18	1	16	1	1031	2100	49.1	6

Rules for classification: 1) points; 2) percentage; 3) number of points for.
(P) Premiers

=== Ladder progression ===
- Numbers highlighted in green indicates the team finished the round inside the top 6.
- Numbers highlighted in blue indicates the team finished in first place on the ladder in that round.
- Numbers highlighted in red indicates the team finished in last place on the ladder in that round.
- Underlined numbers indicates the team had a bye during that round.

	Team	1	2	3	4	5	6	7	8	9	10	11	12	13	14	15	16	17	18	19	20	21
1	UWS Giants	4	8	12	12	16	20	24	24	28	32	36	36	40	44	48	52	56	60	60	64	64
2	NT Thunder	0	4	8	12	16	16	16	20	20	20	24	28	32	36	40	44	48	52	56	60	60
3	Sydney University	0	0	0	0	4	8	12	16	16	20	20	24	24	28	32	32	36	40	44	44	48
4	Aspley	4	8	12	16	16	20	24	28	28	32	32	36	40	40	40	44	44	44	44	48	48
5	Sydney	4	4	8	12	12	16	16	20	24	28	28	28	28	32	36	36	40	40	44	44	48
6	Southport	4	4	4	8	8	8	12	12	12	12	12	12	12	12	16	16	20	20	24	28	32
7	Gold Coast	0	0	0	4	8	8	8	8	8	8	8	12	16	20	20	20	20	24	24	28	32
8	Redland	4	4	4	4	4	8	8	8	8	12	16	20	20	20	20	24	24	24	28	28	28
9	Ainslie	0	4	8	8	8	8	12	16	16	16	16	16	18	18	18	18	18	22	22	22	22
10	Brisbane	0	4	4	4	4	4	4	4	4	4	4	4	4	4	4	4	4	4	4	4	8
11	Eastlake	0	0	0	0	0	0	0	0	0	0	4	4	6	6	6	6	6	6	6	6	6

== Finals series ==
Elimination finals
Aspley	9.13 (67)
Sydney	9.6 (60)
Sydney University	14.22 (106)
Southport	6.12 (48)

Preliminary finals
UWS Giants	9.15 (69)
Aspley	25.8 (158)
NT Thunder	19.14 (128)
Sydney University	8.10 (58)

Grand Final
NT Thunder	11.15 (81)
Aspley	11.14 (80)

=== Elimination finals ===
	Elimination finals
Saturday, 5 September (12:00 pm)	Aspley 9.13 (67)	def.	Sydney 9.6 (60)	Graham Road
Saturday, 5 September (1:30 pm)	Sydney University 14.22 (106)	def.	Southport 6.12 (48)	Blacktown International Sportspark

=== Preliminary finals ===
	Preliminary finals
Saturday, 12 September (12:00 pm)	UWS Giants 9.15 (69)	def. by	Aspley 25.8 (158)	Blacktown International Sportspark
Saturday, 12 September (6:30 pm)	NT Thunder 19.14 (128)	def.	Sydney University 8.10 (58)	TIO Stadium

=== Grand Final ===
2015 NEAFL Grand Final
Saturday 19 September (6:30 pm)	NT Thunder	def.	Aspley	TIO Stadium (crowd: 5,889)	Report
3.2 (20); 6.8 (44); 10.10 (70); 11.15 (81)	Q1; Q2; Q3; Final	1.3 (9); 4.10 (34); 6.11 (47); 11.14 (80)	Umpires: Alex Whetton, Cameron Barr, James Waldorff; Andrew Ireland Medal: Chris Dunne (NT Thunder)
4: Dunne; 3: Ewing; 1: Hagan, Lockwood, Turner, Patrick	Goals	2: Hipwood, French; 1: Dickson, Grose, Payne, Stevenson, Jackson, Sansbury, Neils
Rioli, Dunne, Ewing, Ilett, Beugelaar, Motlop	Best	Payne, Hutchinson, Wagner, Stiller, Williams, Grose

== Representative match ==
The NEAFL representative team played against the Tasmanian State League representative team in the league's sole state match for the year. The match was played on 7 June in Burpengary and the victory was the first time a NEAFL representative side had won since the competition unified in 2014.

State Game 7 June 2015; 3:45pm	NEAFL	77 - 57	TSL	Moreton Bay Central Sports Complex, Burpengary match report
	3.1 (19); 6.3 (39); 4.6 (48); 11.11 (77)		4.3 (27); 6.6 (42); 7.8 (50); 8.9 (57)
		Goals
	J. Bennett 3, S. Michael 2, B. Grewar 2, E. Sansbury, M. Uebergang, J. Williams, J. Derickx		B. Halton 2, B. Webb, S. Whiting, M. Willis, J. Laycock, J. Blackberry, J. Dobosz
		Bests
	T. Barton, G. Grose, J. Hunt, J. Wagner, T. Young, M. Rawlinson		B. Webb, J. Harper, J. Cox, M. Willis, B. Walsh

=== Squad ===
The 2015 NEAFL representative squad consisted of players from all NEAFL clubs excluding AFL reserves teams (Brisbane, Gold Coast, Sydney, UWS Giants). The team contained seven former AFL-listed players, led by two-time premiership winner with Geelong and 200-gamer, Josh Hunt. The side also included young talent in the NEAFL with the inclusion of three 2015 AFL draftees, Josh Smith, Matt Uebergang, and Josh Wagner. The team was coached by AFL Queensland Hall of Famer and former AFL footballer, John Blair. Sydney University captain, Tim Barton, was named as best on ground.

23-man squad
B:	Peter Yagmoor (Redland)	Justin Beugelaar (NT Thunder)	Tim Barton (Sydney University) (vc)
HB:	Josh Wagner (Aspley)	Gavin Grose (Aspley) (vc)	Ben Headland (Ainslie)
C:	Jordan Harper (Ainslie)	Cameron Ilett (NT Thunder) (C)	Josh Smith (Redland)
HF:	Mitch Thompson (Sydney University)	Jacob Derickx (Sydney University)	Blake Grewar (Redland)
F:	Eddie Sansbury (Aspley)	Josh Bennett (Ainslie)	Josh Hunt (Southport)
Foll:	Ben Dowdell (Eastlake)	Jon Williams (Aspley)	Tom Young (Sydney University)
Int:	Joey Daye (Aspley)	Sam Michael (Redland)	Matt Rawlinson (Sydney University)
Int:	Matt Uebergang (Redland)	Nicholas Winmar (Sydney University)	
Coach:	John Blair (Aspley)		

== Awards ==
- The League MVP was awarded to Tom Young of Sydney University, who received 86 votes.
- The NEAFL Rising Star was awarded to Maxwell Kouvaras of >(Brisbane)</ polled most possessions in debut year.
- The NEAFL leading goalkicker was awarded to Darren Ewing of NT Thunder, who kicked 78 goals during the regular season.
- The NEAFL goal of the year was awarded to Will Hoskin-Elliott of UWS Giants, for his goal during round 14.
- The NEAFL mark of the year was awarded to Jarrod Garlett of Gold Coast, for his mark during round 18.

=== Team of the Year ===
2015 NEAFL Team of the Year
B:	Harrison Marsh (Sydney)	Justin Beugelaar (NT Thunder)	Lewis Stevenson (Sydney University)
HB:	Josh Wagner (Aspley)	Gavin Grose (Aspley)	Curtly Hampton (UWS Giants)
C:	Richard Tambling (NT Thunder)	Matthew Payne (Aspley)	Josh Smith (Redland)
HF:	Cameron Ilett (NT Thunder) (C)	Jack Anthony (Southport)	Jed Baker (UWS Giants)
F:	Eddie Sansbury (Aspley)	Darren Ewing (NT Thunder)	Matt Rawlinson (Sydney University)
Foll:	Ben Dowdell (Eastlake)	Tom Young (Sydney University)	Maxwell Kouvaras (Brisbane)
Int:	Matt Uebergang (Redland)	Jake Barrett (UWS Giants)	James Mackenzie (Sydney)
Int:	Nick Salter (Ainslie)	Tyrone Downie (Gold Coast)	
Coach:	Brett Hand (UWS Giants)		

=== Rising Star nominations ===
The NEAFL Rising Star was awarded to the most promising young talent in the NEAFL competition. Players were nominated each week and must have been under the age of 21 and have played less than 20 NEAFL games.

Round	Player	Club	Ref.
1	Maxwell Kouvaras	Eastlake	
2	Jack Rolls	Brisbane Lions	
3	Matt Uebergang	Redland	
4	Ben Keays	Brisbane	
5	James Mackenzie	NT Thunder	
6	Stephen Camp	Eastlake	
7	Eric Hipwood	Brisbane	
8	Liam Griffiths	Ainslie	
9	—	—	^{1}
10	Scott Miller	Redland	
11	James Holland	Southport	
12	Brydan Hodgson	Eastlake	
13	Nicholas Jackson	Aspley	
14	Michael Hagan	NT Thunder	
15	Mitch Mahady	Sydney University	
16	Tim Jones	Southport	
17	Jock Cornell	UWS Giants	
18	Dyson Budarick	Gold Coast	

1. No-one nominated due to it being the representative match round.

=== Best and fairest winners ===
Club	Award name	Player	Ref.
Ainslie	Hibberson Cup Trophy	Nick Salter	
Aspley	Carl Herbert Medal	Matt Payne	
Brisbane	Neville Fallon Medal	Zac O'Brien	
Eastlake	Best and Fairest	Ben Dowdell	
Eastlake	Best and Fairest	Nick Fothergill	
Gold Coast	NEAFL Player of the Year	Tyrone Downie	
NT Thunder	Club Champion	Richard Tambling	
Redland	Dowling Medal	Josh Smith	
Southport	Doc Mackenzie Medal	Josh Hunt	
Sydney			
Sydney University	Driscoll Medal	Matt Rawlinson	
UWS Giants	NEAFL Development Award	Jake Barrett	

== AFL draftees ==
Draft pick	Player	Club	Drafted to
3_{N}	Callum Mills	Sydney	Sydney
7_{N}	Jacob Hopper	Greater Western Sydney	Greater Western Sydney
14_{N}	Eric Hipwood	Aspley	Brisbane Lions
14_{N}	Harrison Himmelberg	Eastlake	Greater Western Sydney
24_{N}	Ben Keays	Brisbane	Brisbane Lions
41_{N}	Matt Flynn	Greater Western Sydney	Greater Western Sydney
43_{N}	Corey Wagner	Brisbane	North Melbourne
69_{N}	Wylie Buzza	Redland	Geelong
6_{R}	Josh Wagner	Aspley	Melbourne
9_{R}	Jock Cornell	UWS Giants	Geelong
13_{R}	Paul Hunter	Redland	Adelaide
16_{R}	Matt Uebergang	Redland	Fremantle
20_{R}	Reuben William	Brisbane	Brisbane Lions
23_{R}	Nick Coughlan	UWS Giants	St Kilda
25_{R}	Josh Smith	Redland	Collingwood
30_{R}	Mabior Chol	Aspley	Richmond
34_{R}	Ryan Nyhuis	NT Thunder	Fremantle
67_{R}	Jesse Joyce	Gold Coast	Gold Coast

N – national draft
R – rookie draft
