= 2017 NEAFL season =

- Teams: 10
- Premiers: Brisbane; 3rd premiership
- Minor premiers: Sydney; 3rd minor premiership
- Matches played: 65

The 2017 NEAFL season was the seventh season of the North East Australian Football League (NEAFL). The season began on Saturday, 1 April and concluded on Saturday, 9 September with the NEAFL Grand Final.

== Participating clubs ==
2017 NEAFL participating clubs
Club	Location	Home ground
Aspley	Brisbane, QLD	Graham Road
Brisbane	Brisbane, QLD	South Pine Sports Complex
Canberra	Canberra, ACT	UNSW Canberra Oval
Gold Coast	Gold Coast, QLD	Metricon Stadium
NT Thunder	Darwin, NT	TIO Stadium
Redland	Brisbane, QLD	Tidbold Park
Southport	Gold Coast, QLD	Fankhauser Reserve
Sydney	Sydney, NSW	Sydney Cricket Ground
Sydney University	Sydney, NSW	Henson Park
WSU Giants	Sydney, NSW	Spotless Stadium

== Premiership season ==
Source: NEAFL 2017 season results and fixture

Notable features of the draw include:

- Two regional matches in Newcastle and Wagga Wagga.
- First Friday night match in Darwin, Northern Territory.
- First matches at new South Pine Sports Complex facilities.
- Nineteen confirmed AFL curtain raisers.
- Six aligned AFL academy under-18 series matches.
- NEAFL representative match v TSL in round 11.
- All starting times are local.

=== Round 1 ===
	Round 1
Saturday, 1 April (12:00 pm)	Canberra 16.7 (103)	def.	Redland 12.10 (82)	Allinsure Park
Saturday, 1 April (12:00 pm)	Southport 10.12 (72)	def. by	Sydney University 15.14 (104)	Fankhauser Reserve
Saturday, 1 April (12:55 pm)	WSU Giants 19.11 (125)	def.	Gold Coast 15.7 (97)	Spotless Stadium
Saturday, 1 April (1:30 pm)	Brisbane 17.9 (111)	def.	Sydney 12.13 (85)	Blacktown ISP Oval
Saturday, 1 April (6:30 pm)	NT Thunder 19.11 (125)	def.	Aspley 9.14 (68)	TIO Stadium

=== Round 2 ===
	Round 2
Saturday, 8 April (12:00 pm)	Aspley 17.15 (117)	def.	Canberra 7.7 (49)	Graham Road
Saturday, 8 April (1:30 pm)	Sydney 20.9 (129)	def.	Southport 3.9 (27)	Blacktown ISP Oval
Saturday, 8 April (4:30 pm)	WSU Giants 12.13 (85)	def. by	Sydney University 20.8 (128)	Blacktown ISP Oval
Saturday, 8 April (6:30 pm)	NT Thunder 11.9 (75)	def. by	Brisbane 15.11 (101)	TIO Stadium
Sunday, 9 April (1:30 pm)	Redland 9.6 (60)	def. by	Gold Coast 23.14 (152)	Tidbold Park

=== Round 3 ===
	Round 3
Saturday, 15 April (11:30 am)	Brisbane 14.19 (103)	def.	Southport 6.8 (44)	South Pine Sports Complex
Saturday, 15 April (12:00 pm)	Canberra 13.17 (95)	def.	WSU Giants 12.7 (79)	Alan Ray Oval
Saturday, 15 April (12:00 pm)	Sydney University 19.9 (123)	def.	Redland 10.6 (66)	Henson Park
Saturday, 15 April (2:30 pm)	Aspley 10.13 (73)	def. by	Gold Coast 13.9 (87)	South Pine Sports Complex
	Bye; NT Thunder, Sydney

=== Round 4 ===
	Round 4
Saturday, 22 April (12:00 pm)	Southport 15.17 (107)	def.	Canberra 7.9 (51)	Fankhauser Reserve
Saturday, 22 April (12:00 pm)	Aspley 11.10 (76)	def. by	Sydney University 15.10 (100)	Graham Road
Saturday, 22 April (12:55 pm)	Gold Coast 9.10 (64)	def. by	Brisbane 16.13 (109)	Metricon Stadium
Saturday, 22 April (1:30 pm)	Redland 10.8 (68)	def. by	NT Thunder 15.17 (107)	Tidbold Park
Saturday, 22 April (3:45 pm)	Sydney 13.13 (91)	def.	WSU Giants 8.7 (55)	Sydney Cricket Ground

=== Round 5 ===
	Round 5
Friday, 28 April (7:30 pm)	NT Thunder 13.6 (84)	def. by	Sydney 16.12 (108)	TIO Stadium
Saturday, 29 April (10:30 am)	Sydney University 17.12 (114)	def.	Gold Coast 10.7 (67)	Blacktown ISP Oval
Saturday, 29 April (1:30 pm)	Southport 8.12 (60)	def. by	Aspley 13.10 (88)	Fankhauser Reserve
	Bye; Brisbane, Canberra, Redland, WSU Giants

=== Round 6 ===
	Round 6
Saturday, 6 May (1:30 pm)	Aspley 10.12 (72)	def.	Redland 8.12 (60)	Graham Road
Saturday, 6 May (3:45 pm)	Gold Coast 18.14 (122)	def.	WSU Giants 10.11 (71)	Metricon Stadium
Saturday, 6 May (6:30 pm)	NT Thunder 10.17 (77)	def. by	Canberra 12.10 (82)	TIO Stadium
Sunday, 7 May (9:30 am)	Sydney 15.12 (102)	def.	Brisbane 10.5 (65)	Sydney Cricket Ground
	Bye; Southport, Sydney University

=== Round 7 ===
	Round 7
Saturday, 13 May (10:30 am)	WSU Giants 5.8 (58)	def. by	Aspley 19.15 (129)	Blacktown ISP Oval
Saturday, 13 May (12:00 pm)	Canberra 6.8 (44)	def. by	Sydney 25.15 (165)	UNSW Canberra Oval
Saturday, 13 May (1:30 pm)	Sydney University 18.22 (120)	def.	Southport 5.13 (43)	Blacktown ISP Oval
Saturday, 13 May (1:30 pm)	Redland 17.15 (117)	def.	Brisbane 16.8 (104)	Tidbold Park
Saturday, 13 May (6:30 pm)	NT Thunder 13.12 (90)	def.	Gold Coast 9.6 (60)	TIO Stadium

=== Round 8 ===
	Round 8
Friday, 19 May (7:00 pm)	Sydney University 10.5 (65)	def. by	Sydney 15.17 (107)	Henson Park
Saturday, 20 May (12:00 pm)	Southport 6.10 (46)	def. by	NT Thunder 16.17 (113)	Fankhauser Reserve
Saturday, 20 May (12:00 pm)	Redland 8.14 (62)	def. by	Canberra 10.13 (73)	Tidbold Park
Saturday, 20 May (12:55 pm)	WSU Giants 11.11 (77)	def. by	Brisbane 11.12 (78)	Spotless Stadium
	Bye; Aspley, Gold Coast

=== Round 9 ===
	Round 9
Saturday, 27 May (12:00 pm)	Sydney 16.24 (120)	def.	Gold Coast 4.8 (32)	Newcastle Stadium
Saturday, 27 May (12:00 pm)	Sydney University 11.14 (80)	def.	Canberra 8.14 (62)	Blacktown ISP Oval
Saturday, 27 May (1:30 pm)	Southport 17.24 (126)	def.	Redland 8.7 (55)	Fankhauser Reserve
Saturday, 27 May (1:30 pm)	Aspley 9.6 (60)	def. by	Brisbane 23.14 (152)	Graham Road
Saturday, 27 May (6:30 pm)	NT Thunder 18.18 (126)	def.	WSU Giants 11.5 (71)	TIO Stadium

=== Round 10 ===
	Round 10
Saturday, 3 June (10:05 am)	Gold Coast 23.18 (156)	def.	Southport 6.3 (39)	Metricon Stadium
Saturday, 3 June (12:00 pm)	Canberra 10.16 (76)	def. by	Aspley 12.11 (83)	UNSW Canberra Oval
Saturday, 3 June (12:55 pm)	WSU Giants 7.10 (52)	def. by	Redland 14.14 (98)	Spotless Stadium
Saturday, 3 June (6:30 pm)	NT Thunder 6.6 (42)	def. by	Sydney University 15.20 (110)	TIO Stadium
	Bye; Brisbane, Sydney

=== Round 11 ===
	Round 11
Saturday, 10 June (12:00 pm)	Sydney 28.17 (185)	def.	WSU Giants 2.2 (14)	Henson Park
Saturday, 10 June (12:00 pm)	Brisbane 12.13 (85)	def.	Gold Coast 11.14 (80)	South Pine Sports Complex
	Bye; Aspley, Canberra, NT Thunder, Redland, Southport, Sydney University

=== Round 12 ===
	Round 12
Saturday, 17 June (12:00 pm)	Canberra 7.9 (51)	def. by	NT Thunder 21.16 (142)	UNSW Canberra Oval
Saturday, 17 June (12:00 pm)	Aspley 8.4 (52)	def. by	Sydney 22.22 (154)	South Pine Sports Complex
Saturday, 17 June (12:00 pm)	Redland 13.5 (83)	def. by	Sydney University 17.20 (122)	Tidbold Park
Saturday, 17 June (1:30 pm)	Southport 4.1 (25)	def. by	Brisbane 27.13 (175)	Fankhauser Reserve
	Bye; Gold Coast, WSU Giants

=== Round 13 ===
	Round 13
Friday, 23 June (4:10 pm)	Sydney University 9.10 (64)	def. by	Sydney 15.16 (106)	Sydney Cricket Ground
Saturday, 24 June (12:00 pm)	Brisbane 22.15 (147)	def.	WSU Giants 7.9 (51)	South Pine Sports Complex
Saturday, 24 June (1:30 pm)	Redland 11.17 (83)	def. by	Aspley 16.9 (105)	Tidbold Park
Saturday, 24 June (4:30 pm)	NT Thunder 10.10 (70)	def. by	Southport 19.19 (123)	TIO Traeger Park
Sunday, 25 June (12:00 pm)	Canberra 5.10 (40)	def. by	Gold Coast 19.8 (122)	UNSW Canberra Oval

=== Round 14 ===
	Round 14
Saturday, 1 July (12:00 pm)	Sydney University 10.7 (67)	def. by	Brisbane 21.6 (132)	Henson Park
Saturday, 1 July (12:00 pm)	Canberra 7.5 (47)	def. by	Sydney 20.18 (138)	UNSW Canberra Oval
Saturday, 1 July (12:55 pm)	Gold Coast 25.13 (163)	def.	Aspley 5.6 (36)	Metricon Stadium
Saturday, 1 July (1:30 pm)	Redland 16.15 (111)	def.	Southport 13.12 (90)	Tidbold Park
Saturday, 1 July (3:15 pm)	WSU Giants 14.9 (93)	def. by	NT Thunder 15.7 (97)	Spotless Stadium

=== Round 15 ===
	Round 15
Saturday, 8 July (12:00 pm)	Southport 18.10 (118)	def.	WSU Giants 7.6 (48)	Fankhauser Reserve
Saturday, 8 July (12:55 pm)	Sydney 21.10 (136)	def.	Gold Coast 4.5 (29)	Sydney Cricket Ground
Saturday, 8 July (1:30 pm)	Aspley 6.9 (45)	def. by	Brisbane 25.16 (166)	Graham Road
Saturday, 8 July (2:00 pm)	Sydney University 18.25 (133)	def.	Canberra 4.8 (32)	Blacktown ISP Oval
Saturday, 8 July (3:00 pm)	NT Thunder 18.4 (122)	def.	Redland 8.7 (55)	TIO Stadium

=== Round 16 ===
	Round 16
Saturday, 15 July (12:00 pm)	Canberra 10.17 (77)	def.	Southport 9.7 (61)	UNSW Canberra Oval
Saturday, 15 July (12:55 pm)	Gold Coast 21.15 (141)	def.	Redland 10.4 (64)	Metricon Stadium
Saturday, 15 July (3:00 pm)	NT Thunder 14.13 (97)	def.	Aspley 13.7 (85)	TIO Stadium
Saturday, 15 July (3:45 pm)	WSU Giants 8.5 (53)	def. by	Sydney 16.16 (112)	Spotless Stadium
	Bye; Brisbane, Sydney University

=== Round 17 ===
	Round 17
Saturday, 22 July (1:30 pm)	Southport 6.4 (40)	def. by	Gold Coast 14.14 (98)	Fankhauser Reserve
Saturday, 22 July (2:00 pm)	Sydney University 11.5 (71)	def. by	WSU Giants 12.12 (84)	Blacktown ISP Oval
Saturday, 22 July (3:45 pm)	Sydney 25.24 (174)	def.	NT Thunder 4.4 (28)	Sydney Cricket Ground
Sunday, 23 July (1:00 pm)	Brisbane 20.12 (132)	def.	Redland 18.6 (114)	Gabba
	Bye; Aspley, Canberra

=== Round 18 ===
	Round 18
Saturday, 29 July (12:00 pm)	Sydney University 18.14 (122)	def.	Aspley 9.5 (59)	Henson Park
Saturday, 29 July (12:00 pm)	Canberra 8.11 (59)	def. by	Brisbane 23.15 (153)	UNSW Canberra Oval
Saturday, 29 July (3:00 pm)	NT Thunder 20.13 (133)	def.	Southport 13.8 (86)	TIO Stadium
Saturday, 29 July (3:45 pm)	Gold Coast 15.13 (103)	def.	WSU Giants 10.12 (72)	Metricon Stadium
	Bye; Redland, Sydney

=== Round 19 ===
	Round 19
Saturday, 5 August (12:00 pm)	Canberra 12.8 (80)	def.	WSU Giants 10.15 (75)	Robertson Oval
Saturday, 5 August (12:00 pm)	Brisbane 19.14 (128)	def.	Sydney 15.19 (109)	South Pine Sports Complex
Saturday, 5 August (1:30 pm)	Redland 16.9 (105)	def.	Aspley 9.8 (62)	Tidbold Park
Saturday, 5 August (2:00 pm)	Sydney University 15.17 (167)	def.	NT Thunder 7.7 (49)	Henson Park
	Bye; Gold Coast, Southport

=== Round 20 ===
	Round 20
Saturday, 12 August (10:05 am)	Sydney 26.17 (173)	def.	Redland 6.10 (46)	Sydney Cricket Ground
Saturday, 12 August (12:00 pm)	Canberra 6.12 (48)	def. by	Sydney University 15.17 (107)	UNSW Canberra Oval
Saturday, 12 August (12:55 pm)	Brisbane 16.8 (104)	def. by	Gold Coast 16.15 (111)	Gabba
Saturday, 12 August (1:30 pm)	Aspley 20.12 (132)	def.	Southport 13.9 (87)	Graham Road
	Bye; NT Thunder, WSU Giants

=== Round 21 ===
	Round 21
Saturday, 19 August (12:00 pm)	Southport 13.12 (90)	def. by	Canberra 14.12 (96)	Fankhauser Reserve
Saturday, 19 August (12:00 pm)	Gold Coast 13.5 (83)	def. by	Sydney 23.12 (150)	Metricon Stadium
Saturday, 19 August (12:00 pm)	Redland 10.6 (66)	def. by	Sydney University 17.12 (114)	Tidbold Park
Saturday, 19 August (12:55 pm)	WSU Giants 13.10 (88)	def. by	Brisbane 14.9 (93)	Spotless Stadium
Saturday, 19 August (1:30 pm)	Aspley 16.10 (106)	def.	NT Thunder 8.13 (61)	Graham Road

== Win/loss table ==
+	Win	Qualified for finals
−	Loss	Eliminated

Bold – Home game
X – Bye
Opponent for round listed above margin
This table can be sorted by margin

Team	1	2	3	4	5	6	7	8	9	10	11	12	13	14	15	16	17	18	19	20	21	F1	F2	GF	Ladder
Aspley	NT; 57	**Can**; **68**	**GC**; **14**	**SydU**; **24**	SP; 28	**Red**; **12**	WSU; 71	X	**BL**; **92**	Can; 7	X	**SydS**; **102**	Red; 22	GC; 127	**BL**; **121**	NT	X	SydU	Red	**SP**	**NT**				
Brisbane	**Syd**; **26**	NT; 26	**SP**; **59**	GC; 45	X	SydS; 37	Red; 13	WSU; 1	Asp; 92	X	**GC**; **5**	SP; 150	**WSU**; **96**	SydU; 65	Asp; 121	X	**Red**	Can	**SydS**	**GC**	WSU				
Canberra	**Red**; **21**	Asp; 68	**WSU**; **16**	SP; 56	X	NT; 5	**SydS**; **121**	Red; 11	SydU; 71	**Asp**; **7**	X	**NT**; **91**	**GC**; **82**	**SydS**; **91**	SydU; 101	**SP**	X	**BL**	**WSU**	**SydU**	SP				
Gold Coast	WSU; 28	Red; 92	Asp; 14	**BL**; **45**	SydU; 47	**WSU**; **51**	NT; 30	X	SydS; 88	**SP**; **117**	BL; 5	X	Can; 82	**Asp**; **127**	SydS; 107	**Red**	SP	**WSU**	X	BL	**SydS**				
NT Thunder	**Asp**; **57**	**BL**; **26**	X	Red; 39	**SydS**; **24**	**Can**; **5**	**GC**; **30**	SP; 42	**WSU**; **55**	**SydU**; **68**	X	Can; 91	**SP**; **53**	WSU; 4	**Red**; **67**	**Asp**	SydS	**SP**	SydU	X	Asp				
Redland	Can; 21	**GC**; **92**	SydU; 57	**NT**; **39**	X	Asp; 12	**BL**; **13**	**Can**; **11**	Red; 18	WSU; 46	X	SydU; 39	**Asp**; **22**	**SP**; **21**	NT; 67	GC	BL	X	**Asp**	SydS	**SydU**				
Southport	**SydU**; **32**	SydS; 102	BL; 59	**Can**; **56**	**Asp**; **28**	X	SydU; 87	**NT**; **42**	**Red**; **18**	GC; 117	X	**BL**; **150**	NT; 53	Red; 21	**WSU**; **70**	Can	**GC**	NT	X	Asp	**Can**				
Sydney	BL; 26	**SP**; **102**	X	**WSU**; **36**	NT; 24	**BL**; **37**	Can; 121	SydU; 67	**GC**; **88**	X	**WSU**; **171**	Asp; 102	SydU; 42	Can; 91	**GC**; **107**	WSU	**NT**	X	BL	**Red**	GC				
Sydney University	SP; 32	WSU; 43	**Red**; **57**	Asp; 24	**GC**; **47**	X	**SP**; **87**	**SydS**; **67**	**Can**; **71**	NT; 68	X	Red; 39	**SydS**; **42**	**BL**; **65**	**Can**; **101**	X	**WSU**	**Asp**	**NT**	Can	Red				
WSU Giants	**GC**; **28**	**SydU**; **43**	Can; 16	SydS; 36	X	GC; 51	**Asp**; **71**	**BL**; **1**	NT; 55	**Red**; **46**	SydS; 171	X	BL; 96	**NT**; **4**	SP; 70	**SydS**	SydU	GC	Can	X	**BL**				
Team	1	2	3	4	5	6	7	8	9	10	11	12	13	14	15	16	17	18	19	20	21	F1	F2	GF	Ladder

== Ladder ==
Pos	Team	Pld	W	L	D	PF	PA	PP	Pts
1	Sydney	18	16	2	0	2350	1008	233.1	64
2	Brisbane	18	15	3	0	2138	1373	155.7	60
3	Sydney University	18	14	4	0	1948	1278	152.4	56
4	Gold Coast	18	10	8	0	1767	1528	115.6	40
5	NT Thunder	18	10	8	0	1632	1673	97.5	40
6	Aspley	18	8	10	0	1448	1805	80.2	32
7	Canberra	18	7	11	0	1158	1919	60.3	28
8	Redland	18	4	14	0	1402	1927	72.8	16
9	Southport	18	4	14	0	1257	1870	67.2	16
10	WSU Giants	18	2	16	0	1251	1970	63.5	8

Updated to match(es) played on 10 September 2017. Source: NEAFL
Rules for classification: 1) points; 2) percentage; 3) number of points for.

=== Ladder progression ===
- Numbers highlighted in green indicates the team finished the round inside the top six.
- Numbers highlighted in blue indicates the team finished in first place on the ladder in that round.
- Numbers highlighted in red indicates the team finished in last place on the ladder in that round.
- Underlined numbers indicates the team had a bye during that round.

	Team	1	2	3	4	5	6	7	8	9	10	11	12	13	14	15	16	17	18	19	20	21
1	Sydney	0	4	4	8	12	16	20	24	28	28	32	36	40	44	48						
2	Brisbane	4	8	12	16	16	16	16	20	24	24	28	32	36	40	44						
3	Sydney University	4	8	12	16	20	20	24	24	28	32	32	36	36	36	40						
4	NT Thunder	4	4	4	8	8	8	12	16	20	20	20	24	24	28	32						
5	Gold Coast	0	4	8	8	8	12	12	12	12	16	16	16	20	24	24						
6	Aspley	0	4	4	4	8	12	16	16	16	20	20	20	24	24	24						
7	Southport	0	0	0	4	4	4	4	4	8	8	8	8	12	12	16						
8	Canberra	4	4	8	8	8	12	12	16	16	16	16	16	16	16	16						
9	Redland	0	0	0	0	0	4	4	4	4	8	8	8	8	12	12						
10	WSU Giants	4	4	4	4	4	4	4	4	4	4	4	4	4	4	4						

== Finals series ==
Elimination finals
Gold Coast	19.9 (123)
NT Thunder	12.12 (84)
Sydney University	19.12 (126)
Aspley	11.10 (76)

Preliminary finals
Sydney	21.16 (142)
Gold Coast	11.8 (74)
Brisbane	16.19 (115)
Sydney University	12.11 (83)

Grand final
Sydney	10.22 (82)
Brisbane	12.13 (85)

=== Elimination finals ===
	Elimination finals
Saturday, 26 August (12:00 pm)	Gold Coast 19.9 (123)	def.	NT Thunder 12.12 (84)	Metricon Stadium
Saturday, 26 August (1:00 pm)	Sydney University 16.14 (110)	def.	Aspley 13.11 (89)	Blacktown International Sportspark

=== Preliminary finals ===
	Preliminary finals
Saturday, 2 September (11:00 am)	Sydney 21.16 (142)	def.	Gold Coast 11.8 (74)	Blacktown International Sportspark
Saturday, 2 September (12:00 pm)	Brisbane 16.19 (115)	def.	Sydney University 12.11 (83)	The Gabba

=== Grand Final ===
2017 NEAFL Grand Final
Saturday, 9 September (7:45 pm)	Sydney	def. by	Brisbane	Sydney Cricket Ground
2.6 (18); 5.10 (40); 7.13 (55); 10.22 (82)	Q1; Q2; Q3; Final	2.2 (14); 6.7 (43); 11.9 (75); 12.13 (85)
Dawson 4, Pink 2, Wicks, Edwards, Ronke, O'Riordan	Goals	Grewar 3, Allison 2, Keays 2, Ballenden 2, O'Sullivan, Beams, Lyons
Foote, Hayward, Pink, Florent, Dawson	Best	Keays, Eagles, Hinge, Allison, Grewar, Jansen

== Representative match ==
The NEAFL representative team played against the Tasmanian State League representative team in the league's sole state match for the year. The match was played on 10 June at Blundstone Arena with the NEAFL representative side winning by seventeen points.

State Game 10 June 2017; 2:00 pm	North East Australia	55 – 38	Tasmania	Blundstone Arena
	2.1 (13); 5.4 (34); 7.5 (47); 8.7 (55)		1.2 (8); 2.5 (17); 4.7 (31); 5.8 (38)
		Goals
	A. Boston 3, J. Harper, D. Bonney, X. Richards, J. Anthony, T. Barrett		J. Bowden, B. Walsh, B. Cox-Goodyer, B. McCulloch, T. Standen
		Bests
	G. Grose, J. Harper, J. Keras, R. Hebron, D. Bonney, S. Tape		T. Couch, C. Duffy, B. Webb, J. Bowden, J. Lockhart, N. McKenna

=== Squad ===
The 2017 NEAFL representative squad consisted of players from all NEAFL clubs excluding AFL reserves teams (Brisbane, Gold Coast, Sydney, WSU Giants). The team contained eight former AFL-listed players. The team was coached by AFL Queensland Hall of Famer and former AFL footballer, John Blair.

23-man squad
B:	Darcy Baron-Hay (Sydney University)	Tim Barton (Sydney University)	Seb Tape (Southport)
HB:	Hayden Bertoli-Simmonds (Redland)	Gavin Grose (Aspley)	Reece Toye (Aspley)
C:	Andrew Boston (Southport)	Jordan Harper (Canberra)	Sam Martyn (Canberra)
HF:	Ryan Hebron (Sydney University)	James Nelis (Aspley)	Jack Hiscox (Sydney University)
F:	Jack Anthony (Southport)	Xavier Richards (Sydney University)	Ned Reinhard (Sydney University)
Foll:	Sam Michael (Redland)	Jordan Keras (Southport)	Abraham Ankers (NT Thunder)
Int:	Nathan Cooper (Sydney University)	Daniel Joseph (Aspley)	Tim Barrett (Sydney University)
Int:	Damien Bonney (Sydney University)	Andrew Swan (Canberra)	
Coach:	John Blair (Aspley)		

== Rising Star nominations ==
The NEAFL Rising Star is awarded to the most promising young talent in the NEAFL competition. Players are nominated each week and must be under the age of 21 and have played less than 20 NEAFL games.

Round	Player	Club	Ref.
1	Adam Sambono	NT Thunder	
2	Michael Manteit	Canberra	
3	Ned Reinhard	Sydney University	
4	Darcy Baron-Hay	Sydney University	
5	Will Gowers	Sydney	
6	Oskar Baker	Aspley	
7	Soul Cormick	Redland	
8	Jack Rolls	Redland	
9	Cody Filewood	Southport	
10	Nathan Cooper	Sydney University	
11	Sams Wicks	Sydney	
12	Nick Yarran	NT Thunder	
13	Ryan Hebron	Sydney University	
14	Brendan Myers	WSU Giants	
