= 2016 NEAFL season =

- Teams: 10
- Premiers: WSU Giants; 1st premiership
- Minor premiers: Sydney; 2nd minor premiership
- NEAFL MVP: Matthew Payne; Sydney University (87 votes)
- Leading goalkicker: Darren Ewing; NT Thunder (58 goals)
- Matches played: 94

The 2016 NEAFL season was the sixth season of the North East Australian Football League (NEAFL). The season began on Saturday, 2 April and concluded on Sunday, 11 September with the NEAFL Grand Final. The premiership was won by the WSU Giants.

== Participating clubs ==
Two teams changed their names prior to the 2016 season. Eastlake's NEAFL side started to play as the Canberra Demons in an attempt to be seen as Canberra's representative team in the NEAFL competition. The club wishes to provide a clear AFL pathway for local talent and to get rid of the baggage between other clubs in the ACT. As part of this decision the team also adopted a blue and gold guernsey for home games, reflecting the territory's traditional colours. The team will still wear Eastlake's red and black colours in away matches. The Greater Western Sydney reserves team became known as the Western Sydney University Giants to reflect the re-branding of the university from University of Western Sydney.

2016 NEAFL participating clubs
Club	Location	Home ground
Aspley	Brisbane, QLD	Graham Road
Brisbane	Brisbane, QLD	Giffin Park
Canberra	Canberra, ACT	StarTrack Oval
Gold Coast	Gold Coast, QLD	Metricon Stadium
NT Thunder	Darwin, NT	TIO Stadium
Redland	Brisbane, QLD	Tidbold Park
Southport	Gold Coast, QLD	Fankhauser Reserve
Sydney	Sydney, NSW	Sydney Cricket Ground
Sydney University	Sydney, NSW	Henson Park
WSU Giants	Sydney, NSW	Spotless Stadium

== Premiership season ==
All starting times are local.

=== Round 1 ===
	Round 1
Saturday, 2 April (11:00 am)	Brisbane 5.10 (40)	def. by	Sydney 25.12 (162)	Moreton Bay Central Sports Complex
Saturday, 2 April (12:00 pm)	Canberra 11.8 (74)	def. by	Redland 11.18 (84)	Gungahlin Town Centre Oval
Saturday, 2 April (1:30 pm)	Aspley 14.11 (95)	def.	Southport 12.13 (85)	Graham Road
Saturday, 2 April (6:30 pm)	NT Thunder 11.10 (76)	def.	Gold Coast 8.10 (58)	TIO Stadium
Sunday, 3 April (2:00 pm)	Sydney University 13.13 (91)	def. by	WSU Giants 17.9 (111)	Henson Park

=== Round 2 ===
	Round 2
Saturday, 9 April (12:00 pm)	Southport 17.13 (115)	def.	Canberra 14.13 (97)	Fankhauser Reserve
Saturday, 9 April (12:00 pm)	Sydney 19.16 (130)	def.	WSU Giants 12.7 (79)	Henson Park
Saturday, 9 April (2:00 pm)	Sydney University 16.16 (112)	def.	NT Thunder 6.6 (42)	Blacktown International Sportspark
Saturday, 9 April (3:45 pm)	Gold Coast 11.14 (80)	def. by	Aspley 14.8 (92)	Metricon Stadium
Sunday, 10 April (1:30 pm)	Redland 16.11 (107)	def.	Brisbane 5.10 (40)	Tidbold Park

=== Round 3 ===
	Round 3
Saturday, 16 April (10:00 am)	Brisbane 3.12 (30)	def. by	Gold Coast 21.12 (138)	Leyshon Park
Saturday, 16 April (12:00 pm)	Southport 12.12 (84)	def. by	Sydney University 18.6 (114)	Fankhauser Reserve
Saturday, 16 April (1:00 pm)	Redland 7.10 (52)	def. by	Sydney 23.11 (149)	Leyshon Park
Saturday, 16 April (6:30 pm)	NT Thunder 19.12 (126)	def.	Aspley 12.11 (83)	TIO Stadium
Sunday, 17 April (9:30 am)	Canberra 11.10 (76)	def. by	WSU Giants 14.12 (96)	StarTrack Oval

=== Round 4 ===
	Round 4
Saturday, 23 April (9:30 am)	Sydney 12.13 (85)	def.	Southport 6.9 (45)	Drummoyne Oval
Saturday, 23 April (1:00 pm)	Sydney University 13.16 (94)	def.	Canberra 6.12 (48)	Drummoyne Oval
Saturday, 23 April (2:00 pm)	Aspley 11.7 (73)	def.	Brisbane 9.16 (70)	Graham Road
Saturday, 23 April (6:00 pm)	Gold Coast 11.15 (81)	def.	WSU Giants 8.9 (57)	Tony Ireland Stadium
Saturday, 23 April (6:30 pm)	NT Thunder 10.9 (69)	def.	Redland 5.15 (45)	TIO Stadium

=== Round 5 ===
	Round 5
Saturday, 30 April (12:00 pm)	Aspley 14.12 (96)	def.	Sydney University 7.11 (53)	Graham Road
Saturday, 30 April (12:55 pm)	WSU Giants 9.11 (65)	def. by	NT Thunder 11.12 (78)	Spotless Stadium
Sunday, 1 May (9:30 am)	Brisbane 3.7 (25)	def. by	Sydney 20.15 (135)	Coorparoo
	Bye; Canberra, Gold Coast, Redland, Southport

=== Round 6 ===
	Round 6
Saturday, 7 May (12:00 pm)	Canberra 7.11 (53)	def. by	Aspley 14.14 (98)	StarTrack Oval
Saturday, 7 May (12:00 pm)	Sydney 18.12 (120)	def.	Gold Coast 8.7 (55)	Drummoyne Oval
Saturday, 7 May (1:30 pm)	Redland 13.16 (94)	def.	Southport 14.5 (89)	Tidbold Park
	Bye; Brisbane, NT Thunder, Sydney University, WSU Giants

=== Round 7 ===
	Round 7
Saturday, 14 May (11:00 am)	Sydney University 17.12 (114)	def.	Brisbane 17.2 (104)	Henson Park
Saturday, 14 May (12:00 pm)	Canberra 4.4 (28)	def. by	Sydney 26.14 (170)	StarTrack Oval
Saturday, 14 May (12:55 pm)	WSU Giants 18.10 (118)	def.	Gold Coast 6.11 (47)	Spotless Stadium
Saturday, 14 May (1:30 pm)	Redland 8.6 (54)	def. by	Aspley 17.12 (114)	Tidbold Park
Saturday, 14 May (6:30 pm)	NT Thunder 15.9 (99)	def. by	Southport 18.8 (116)	TIO Stadium

=== Round 8 ===
	Round 8
Saturday, 21 May (10:30 am)	Gold Coast 10.4 (64)	def. by	Redland 20.13 (133)	Metricon Stadium
Saturday, 21 May (12:00 pm)	Southport 10.13 (73)	def. by	Sydney University 13.9 (87)	Fankhauser Reserve
Saturday, 21 May (6:30 pm)	NT Thunder 22.18 (150)	def.	Canberra 7.10 (52)	TIO Stadium
Sunday, 22 May (11:40 am)	WSU Giants 19.9 (123)	def.	Brisbane 10.10 (70)	Spotless Stadium
	Bye; Aspley, Sydney

=== Round 9 ===
	Round 9
Friday, 27 May (4:10 pm)	Sydney University 6.8 (44)	def. by	Sydney 15.13 (103)	Sydney Cricket Ground
Saturday, 28 May (10:30 am)	Canberra 12.11 (83)	def. by	Southport 18.15 (123)	StarTrack Oval
Saturday, 28 May (12:00 pm)	Aspley 16.12 (108)	def.	WSU Giants 11.12 (78)	Graham Road
Saturday, 28 May (5:15 pm)	Brisbane 22.18 (150)	def.	Gold Coast 5.8 (38)	The Gabba
Saturday, 28 May (5:30 pm)	NT Thunder 7.10 (52)	def. by	Redland 11.13 (79)	TIO Traeger Park

=== Round 10 ===
	Round 10
Saturday, 4 June (12:00 pm)	Canberra 8.12 (60)	def.	Brisbane 2.5 (17)	StarTrack Oval
Saturday, 4 June (12:00 pm)	Gold Coast 3.3 (21)	def. by	Sydney 15.17 (107)	Metricon Stadium
Saturday, 4 June (12:00 pm)	Redland 11.2 (68)	def.	Sydney University 5.14 (44)	Tidbold Park
Saturday, 4 June (1:30 pm)	Southport 7.13 (55)	def.	Aspley 0.8 (8)	Fankhauser Reserve
Saturday, 4 June (6:30 pm)	NT Thunder 12.15 (87)	def.	WSU Giants 11.9 (75)	TIO Stadium	Report

=== Round 11 ===
	Round 11
Saturday, 11 June (12:00 pm)	Southport 13.18 (96)	def.	Brisbane 9.15 (69)	Fankhauser Reserve
Saturday, 11 June (1:30 pm)	Aspley 10.9 (69)	def. by	NT Thunder 18.6 (114)	Graham Road	Report
Sunday, 12 June (12:00 pm)	Sydney University 16.16 (112)	def.	Gold Coast 15.9 (99)	Henson Park
Sunday, 12 June (1:00 pm)	WSU Giants 16.13 (109)	def.	Sydney 16.12 (108)	Spotless Stadium
	Bye; Canberra, Redland

=== Round 12 ===
	Round 12
Saturday, 18 June (12:00 pm)	Canberra 12.7 (79)	def. by	WSU Giants 20.12 (132)	Robertson Oval
Saturday, 18 June (5:10 pm)	Brisbane 7.12 (54)	def.	Redland 7.11 (53)	The Gabba
Sunday, 19 June (9:30 am)	Sydney 16.14 (110)	def.	Aspley 7.5 (47)	Sydney Cricket Ground
	Bye; Gold Coast, NT Thunder, Southport, Sydney University

=== Round 13 ===
	Round 13
Saturday, 25 June (10:30 am)	Canberra 15.7 (97)	def. by	Gold Coast 16.13 (109)	StarTrack Oval
Saturday, 25 June (12:55 pm)	WSU Giants 13.15 (93)	def. by	Sydney University 11.10 (76)	Spotless Stadium
Saturday, 25 June (1:30 pm)	Southport 16.8 (104)	def.	Redland 6.8 (44)	Fankhauser Reserve
Saturday, 25 June (6:30 pm)	NT Thunder 20.15 (135)	def.	Brisbane 7.5 (47)	TIO Stadium	Report
	Bye; Aspley, Sydney

=== Round 14 ===
	Round 14
Saturday, 2 July (10:00 am)	Gold Coast 14.11 (95)	def.	Southport 9.8 (62)	Metricon Stadium
Saturday, 2 July (12:00 pm)	Sydney University 12.15 (87)	def.	Aspley 10.9 (69)	Henson Park
Saturday, 2 July (12:55 pm)	Sydney 19.13 (127)	def.	NT Thunder 9.7 (61)	Sydney Cricket Ground	Report
Saturday, 2 July (1:30 pm)	Redland 9.7 (61)	def. by	Canberra 9.15 (69)	Tidbold Park
	Bye; Brisbane, WSU Giants

=== Round 15 ===
	Round 15
Saturday, 9 July (10:00 am)	WSU Giants 14.21 (105)	def.	Southport 9.9 (63)	Spotless Stadium
Saturday, 9 July (12:00 pm)	Canberra 6.7 (43)	def. by	Sydney 20.20 (140)	StarTrack Oval
Saturday, 9 July (12:55 pm)	Gold Coast 14.15 (99)	def.	Brisbane 15.7 (97)	Metricon Stadium
Saturday, 9 July (1:30 pm)	Aspley 12.10 (82)	def.	Redland 9.4 (58)	Graham Road
Saturday, 9 July (3:30 pm)	NT Thunder 11.14 (80)	def. by	Sydney University 13.13 (91)	TIO Stadium	Report

=== Round 16 ===
	Round 16
Saturday, 16 July (12:00 pm)	Sydney 26.14 (170)	def.	Gold Coast 7.4 (46)	Newcastle Oval
Saturday, 16 July (1:30 pm)	Aspley 12.8 (80)	def.	Southport 9.10 (64)	Graham Road
Saturday, 16 July (1:30 pm)	Redland 9.9 (63)	def. by	NT Thunder 10.15 (75)	Tidbold Park	Report
Saturday, 16 July (2:00 pm)	Sydney University 8.6 (54)	def.	Canberra 1.9 (15)	Henson Park
Sunday, 17 July (1:00 pm)	Brisbane 9.14 (68)	def.	WSU Giants 7.13 (55)	The Gabba
The match between Sydney University and Canberra was abandoned at half time, with the progress score taken as the final score, due to an unsafe playing surface, after a section of undermined earth near the centre of Henson Park gave way into a sinkhole.

=== Round 17 ===
	Round 17
Saturday, 23 July (10:05 am)	Sydney 4.19 (43)	def. by	WSU Giants 10.8 (68)	ANZ Stadium
Saturday, 23 July (12:00 pm)	Sydney University 8.12 (60)	def.	Redland 7.9 (51)	Henson Park
Saturday, 23 July (6:30 pm)	NT Thunder 11.10 (76)	def. by	Aspley 13.17 (95)	TIO Stadium	Report
Sunday, 24 July (1:30 pm)	Southport 17.8 (110)	def.	Brisbane 4.11 (35)	Fankhauser Reserve
	Bye; Canberra, Gold Coast

=== Round 18 ===
	Round 18
Saturday, 30 July (3:45 pm)	Brisbane 11.8 (74)	def. by	Aspley 16.15 (111)	The Gabba
Saturday, 30 July (6:00 pm)	Canberra 15.14 (104)	def.	NT Thunder 15.7 (97)	StarTrack Oval	Report
Sunday, 31 July (1:30 pm)	Redland 9.4 (58)	def. by	Gold Coast 26.15 (171)	Leyshon Park
	Bye; Southport, Sydney, Sydney University, WSU Giants

=== Round 19 ===
	Round 19
Saturday, 6 August (10:05 am)	Sydney 24.16 (160)	def.	Brisbane 3.7 (25)	Sydney Cricket Ground
Saturday, 6 August (12:55 pm)	Gold Coast 8.11 (59)	def. by	WSU Giants 27.8 (170)	Metricon Stadium
Saturday, 6 August (1:30 pm)	Aspley 13.8 (96)	def.	Canberra 12.9 (81)	Graham Road
Sunday, 7 August (11:30 am)	Sydney University 16.10 (106)	def.	Southport 15.7 (97)	Blacktown International Sportspark
	Bye; NT Thunder, Redland

=== Round 20 ===
	Round 20
Saturday, 13 August (12:00 pm)	Canberra 10.8 (68)	def. by	Sydney University 13.13 (91)	StarTrack Oval
Saturday, 13 August (12:55 pm)	WSU Giants 26.18 (174)	def.	Redland 3.6 (24)	Spotless Stadium
Saturday, 13 August (6:30 pm)	NT Thunder 14.8 (92)	def.	Sydney 8.6 (54)	TIO Stadium	Report
Sunday, 14 August (1:30 pm)	Southport 11.6 (72)	def. by	Gold Coast 13.7 (85)	Fankhauser Reserve
	Bye; Aspley, Brisbane

=== Round 21 ===
	Round 21
Saturday, 20 August (12:00 pm)	Southport 7.12 (54)	def. by	NT Thunder 16.14 (110)	Fankhauser Reserve
Saturday, 20 August The greater western Sydney giants won the flag.(12:55 pm)	WSU Giants 28.17 (185)	def.	Brisbane 7.4 (46)	Spotless Stadium
Saturday, 20 August (1:30 pm)	Aspley 16.15 (111)	def. by	Gold Coast 18.7 (115)	Graham Road
Saturday, 20 August (1:30 pm)	Redland 21.15 (141)	def.	Canberra 12.16 (88)	Tidbold Park
Saturday, 20 August (2:00 pm)	Sydney University 5.13 (43)	def. by	Sydney 10.8 (68)	Henson Park

== Win/Loss table ==
+	Win		Qualified for finals
-	Loss	X	Bye
	Draw		Eliminated

Bold – Home game
X – Bye
Opponent for round listed above margin
This table can be sorted by margin

Team	1	2	3	4	5	6	7	8	9	10	11	12	13	14	15	16	17	18	19	20	21	F1	F2	GF	Ladder
Aspley	**SP**; **10**	GC; 12	NT; 43	**BL**; **3**	**SydU**; **43**	Can; 45	Red; 60	X	**WSU**; **30**	SP; 43	**NT**; **45**	SydS; 63	X	SydU; 15	**Red**; **24**	**SP**; **16**	NT; 19	BL; 37	**Can**; **15**	X	**GC**; **4**	**NT**; **21**	Syd; 82	X	**4**
Brisbane	**SydS**; **122**	Red; 67	**GC**; **108**	Asp; 3	**SydS**; **110**	X	SydU; 10	WSU; 53	**GC**; **112**	Can; 43	SP; 27	**Red**; **1**	NT; 88	X	GC; 2	**WSU**; **13**	SP; 75	**Asp**; **37**	SydS; 135	X	WSU; 139	X	X	X	10
Canberra	**Red**; **10**	SP; 51	**WSU**; **20**	SydU; 46	X	**Asp**; **45**	**SydS**; **142**	NT; 98	**SP**; **40**	**BL**; **43**	X	**WSU**; **53**	**GC**; **12**	Red; 8	**SydS**; **97**	SydU; 40	X	**NT**; **7**	Asp; 15	**SydU**; **23**	Red; 53	X	X	X	9
Gold Coast	NT; 18	**Asp**; **12**	BL; 108	**WSU**; **24**	X	SydS; 65	WSU; 71	**Red**; **69**	BL; 112	**SydS**; **86**	SydU; 13	X	Can; 12	**SP**; **33**	**BL**; **2**	SydS; 124	X	Red; 113	**WSU**; **111**	SP; 13	Asp; 4	SydU; 77	X	X	**6**
NT Thunder	**GC**; **18**	SydU; 69	**Asp**; **43**	**Red**; **24**	WSU; 13	X	**SP**; **17**	**Can**; **98**	**Red**; **27**	**WSU**; **12**	Asp; 45	X	**BL**; **88**	SydS; 66	**SydU**; **11**	Red; 12	**Asp**; **19**	Can; 7	X	**SydS**; **38**	SP; 56	Asp; 21	X	X	**5**
Redland	Can; 10	**BL**; **67**	**SydS**; **97**	NT; 24	X	**SP**; **5**	**Asp**; **60**	GC; 69	NT; 27	**SydU**; **24**	X	BL; 1	SP; 60	**Can**; **8**	Asp; 24	**NT**; **12**	SydU; 9	**GC**; **113**	X	WSU; 150	**Can**; **53**	X	X	X	8
Southport	Asp; 10	**Can**; **51**	**SydU**; **30**	SydS; 40	X	Red; 5	NT; 17	**SydU**; **14**	Can; 40	**Asp**; **47**	**BL**; **27**	X	**Red**; **60**	GC; 33	WSU; 42	Asp; 16	**BL**; **75**	X	SydU; 9	**GC**; **13**	**NT**; **56**	X	X	X	7
Sydney	BL; 122	**WSU**; **18**	Red; 97	**SP**; **40**	BL; 110	**GC**; **65**	Can; 142	X	SydU; 59	GC; 86	WSU; 1	**Asp**; **63**	X	**NT**; **66**	Can; 97	**GC**; **124**	**WSU**; **25**	X	**BL**; **135**	NT; 38	SydU; 25	X	**Asp**; **82**	**WSU**; **4**	**2**
Sydney University	**WSU**; **20**	**NT**; **69**	SP; 30	**Can**; **46**	Asp; 43	X	**BL**; **10**	SP; 14	**SydS**; **59**	Red; 24	**GC**; **13**	X	WSU; 17	**Asp**; **17**	NT; 11	**Can**; **40**	**Red**; **9**	X	**SP**; **9**	Can; 23	**SydS**; **25**	**GC**; **77**	**WSU**; **87**	X	**3**
WSU Giants	SydU; 20	SydS; 18	Can; 20	GC; 24	**NT**; **13**	X	**GC**; **71**	**BL**; **53**	Asp; 30	NT; 12	**SydS**; **1**	Can; 53	**SydU**; **17**	X	**SP**; **42**	BL; 13	SydS; 25	X	GC; 111	**Red**; **150**	**BL**; **139**	X	**SydU**; **87**	SydS; 4	**1**
Team	1	2	3	4	5	6	7	8	9	10	11	12	13	14	15	16	17	18	19	20	21	F1	F2	GF	Ladder

== Ladder ==
2016 Ladder
Pos	Team	Pld	W	L	D	PF	PA	PP	Pts
1	Sydney	18	15	3	0	2126	941	225.9	60
2	WSU Giants (P)	18	12	6	0	1911	1319	144.9	48
3	Sydney University	18	12	6	0	1471	1368	107.5	48
4	Aspley	18	12	6	0	1527	1432	106.6	48
5	NT Thunder	18	11	7	0	1619	1388	116.6	44
6	Gold Coast	18	8	10	0	1460	1832	79.7	32
7	Southport	18	7	11	0	1522	1473	103.3	28
8	Redland	18	7	11	0	1269	1572	80.7	28
9	Canberra	18	3	15	0	1196	1883	63.5	12
10	Brisbane	18	3	15	0	1061	1954	54.3	12

Rules for classification: 1) points; 2) percentage; 3) number of points for.
(P) Premiers

=== Ladder progression ===
- Numbers highlighted in green indicates the team finished the round inside the top 6.
- Numbers highlighted in blue indicates the team finished in first place on the ladder in that round.
- Numbers highlighted in red indicates the team finished in last place on the ladder in that round.
- Underlined numbers indicates the team had a bye during that round.

	Team	1	2	3	4	5	6	7	8	9	10	11	12	13	14	15	16	17	18	19	20	21
1	Sydney	4	8	12	16	20	24	28	28	32	36	36	40	40	44	48	52	52	52	56	56	60
2	WSU Giants	4	4	8	8	8	8	12	16	16	16	20	24	28	28	32	32	36	36	40	44	48
3	Sydney University	0	4	8	12	12	12	16	20	20	20	24	24	24	28	32	36	40	40	44	48	48
4	Aspley	4	8	8	12	16	20	24	24	28	28	28	28	28	28	32	36	40	44	48	48	48
5	NT Thunder	4	4	8	12	16	16	16	20	20	24	28	28	32	32	32	36	36	36	36	40	44
6	Gold Coast	0	0	4	8	8	8	8	8	8	8	8	8	12	16	20	20	20	24	24	28	32
7	Southport	4	4	4	4	4	4	8	8	12	16	20	20	24	24	24	24	28	28	28	28	28
8	Redland	4	8	8	8	8	12	12	16	20	24	24	24	24	24	24	24	24	24	24	24	28
9	Canberra	0	0	0	0	0	0	0	0	0	4	4	4	4	8	8	8	8	12	12	12	12
10	Brisbane	0	0	0	0	0	0	0	0	4	4	4	8	8	8	8	12	12	12	12	12	12

== Finals series ==
Elimination finals
Aspley	16.14 (110)
NT Thunder	13.11 (89)
Sydney University	19.15 (129)
Gold Coast	7.10 (52)

Preliminary finals
Sydney	15.23 (113)
Aspley	4.7 (31)
WSU Giants	17.15 (117)
Sydney University	4.6 (30)

Grand final
Sydney	11.12 (78)
WSU Giants	11.16 (82)

=== Elimination finals ===
	Elimination finals
Saturday, 27 August (11:45 am)	Sydney University 19.15 (129)	def.	Gold Coast 7.10 (52)	Blacktown International Sportspark
Saturday, 27 August (1:30 pm)	Aspley 16.14 (110)	def.	NT Thunder 13.11 (89)	Graham Road

=== Preliminary finals ===
	Preliminary finals
Saturday, 3 September (11:25 am)	Sydney 15.23 (113)	def.	Aspley 4.7 (31)	Blacktown International Sportspark
Saturday, 3 September (2:15 pm)	WSU Giants 17.15 (117)	def.	Sydney University 4.6 (30)	Blacktown International Sportspark

=== Grand final ===
2016 NEAFL Grand Final
Sunday, 11 September (1:30 pm)	Sydney	def. by	WSU Giants	Blacktown International Sportspark	Report
5.4 (34); 6.9 (45); 8.10 (58); 11.12 (78)	Q1; Q2; Q3; Final	2.5 (17); 6.9 (45); 8.13 (61); 11.16 (82)	Andrew Ireland Medal: Nic Newman (Sydney)
Newman 2, Rose 2, Cunningham, Hiscox, B. Jack, Leonardis, Murray, Reinhard, Robinson	Goals	Barrett 2, Flynn 2, Stewart 2, Byrne, Downie, McKenna, Palmer, Reid
Newman, Foote, Jones, Rose, Melican, B. Jack	Best	Barrett, Reid, A. Kennedy, Palmer, Simpson, McKenna

== Awards ==
- The League MVP was awarded to Matt Payne of Aspley, who received 87 votes.
- The NEAFL Rising Star was awarded to Hayden Bertoli-Simmonds of Redland.
- The NEAFL leading goalkicker was awarded to Darren Ewing of NT Thunder, who kicked 58 goals during the regular season.
- The NEAFL goal of the year was awarded to Luke Rogerson of Redland.
- The NEAFL mark of the year was awarded to Matt Flynn of UWS Giants.

=== Team of the Year ===
2016 NEAFL Team of the Year
B:	Jackson Allen (Aspley)	Matthew Sully (Southport)	Will Sierakowski (Sydney University)
HB:	Nic Newman (Sydney)	Harrison Himmelberg (WSU Giants)	Raphael Clarke (NT Thunder)
C:	Brandon Jack (Sydney)	Matthew Payne (Aspley)	Jordan Foote (Sydney)
HF:	Cameron Ilett (NT Thunder) (C)	Jacob Derickx (Sydney University)	Andrew Boston (Southport)
F:	James Nelis (Aspley)	Darren Ewing (NT Thunder)	Sam Reid (WSU Giants)
Foll:	Fraser Thurlow (Southport)	Jordan Keras (Southport)	Tom Young (Sydney University)
Int:	Colin O'Riordan (Sydney)	Matt Rawlinson (Sydney University)	Blake Grewar (Redland)
Int:	James Ives (Aspley)	Toby Nankervis (Sydney)	
Coach:	Rhyce Shaw (Sydney)		

=== Best and fairest winners ===
Club	Award name	Player	Ref.
Aspley	Carl Herbert Medal	Matt Payne	
Brisbane	Neville Fallon Medal	Billy Evans	
Canberra	Best and fairest	Jordan Harper	
Gold Coast	NEAFL Player of the Year	Keegan Brooksby	
NT Thunder	Club Champion	Cameron Ilett	
Redland	Dowling Medal	Blake Grewar	
Southport	Doc Mackenzie Medal	Andrew Boston	
Sydney			
Sydney University	Driscoll Medal	Tom Young	
WSU Giants	NEAFL Development Award	Jeremy Finlayson	

=== Rising Star nominations ===
The NEAFL Rising Star is awarded to the most promising young talent in the NEAFL competition. Players are nominated each week and must be under the age of 21 and have played less than 20 NEAFL games.

Round	Player	Club	Ref.
1	Hayden Bertoli-Simmonds	Redland	
2	Michael Manteit	Sydney University	
3	Ned Reinhard	Sydney	
4	Luke McKay	Canberra	
5	Matt Wilson	Sydney	
6	Doug Lawrence	Aspley	
7	Brayden Crossley	Gold Coast	
8	Darcy Cameron-Reeves	Redland	
9	Jack Goodall	Redland	
10	Matt Vardanega	Canberra	
11	Jack Rolls	Brisbane	
12	Connor Byrne	WSU Giants	
13	Dyson Budarick	Southport	
14	Tom Highmore	Canberra	
15	Brad Scheer	Gold Coast	
16	Jack Bowes	Gold Coast	
17	Daniel Henderson	Aspley	
18	Jack Clayton	Brisbane	

== AFL draftees ==
Draft pick	Player	Club	Drafted to
10_{N}	Jack Bowes	Gold Coast	Gold Coast
14_{N}	Harry Perryman	WSU Giants	Greater Western Sydney
20_{N}	Issac Cumming	WSU Giants	Greater Western Sydney
34_{N}	Declan Watson	Aspley	North Melbourne
36_{N}	Josh Williams	Gold Coast	North Melbourne
42_{N}	Kobe Mutch	WSU Giants	Essendon
47_{N}	Harrison Macreadie	WSU Giants	Carlton
51_{N}	Elliott Himmelberg	Redland	Adelaide
54_{N}	Lachlan Tiziani	WSU Giants	Greater Western Sydney
55_{N}	Jacob Allison	Aspley	Brisbane Lions
67_{N}	Brad Scheer	Gold Coast	Gold Coast
72_{N}	Ryan Garthwaite	WSU Giants	Richmond
75_{N}	Ben Davis	Sydney	Adelaide
51_{R}	Max Lynch	WSU Giants	Collingwood
Academy pre-selection	Max Spencer	Gold Coast	Gold Coast
Academy pre-selection	Zach Sproule	WSU Giants	Greater Western Sydney
QLD zone selection	Blake Grewar	Brisbane	Brisbane Lions
NSW zone selection	Sam Fisher	Canberra	Sydney

N – national draft
R – rookie draft
