= 2020 NEAFL season =

Second division Australian rules football season

Overview
- Premiers: Premiership not contested

The 2020 NEAFL season was meant to have been the tenth season of the North East Australian Football League (NEAFL). The season was cancelled due to the COVID-19 pandemic and the NEAFL subsequently amalgamated with the Victorian Football League (VFL).

The season was scheduled to begin on 4 April and conclude with the grand final on 21 September. As a result of a new naming rights agreement with Toyota, the season was to be known as the 2020 Toyota NEAFL Premiership Season.

Additionally, the NEAFL's top-six structure for the finals series was set to be changed to a top-five structure for the 2020 season.

== Clubs ==
Nine clubs were set to compete in the 2020 season, with NT Thunder having disbanded at the end of 2019.

=== Standalone ===
- Aspley
- Canberra
- Redland
- Southport
- Sydney University

=== AFL reserves sides ===
- Brisbane
- Gold Coast
- GWS Giants
- Sydney

== Impact of the COVID-19 pandemic ==
Practice matches were held in late February and early March. Like the 2020 AFL season, the season was disrupted by the COVID-19 pandemic, which was formally declared a pandemic on 11 March 2020, three weeks prior to the scheduled start of the premiership season. On 16 March, it was announced that the NEAFL and all other state leagues would be postponed until 31 May.

On 16 June, after discussion on how to proceed with a condensed season in a "non-traditional format", the AFL made the decision to cancel the season.

== Amalgamation with the VFL ==
In August 2020, it was announced that the NEAFL would amalgamate into the VFL, with all of its clubs afforded the opportunity to join the VFL, over a transitional period in 2021 and 2022. Six NEAFL teams opted to join: the Sydney reserves, Greater Western Sydney reserves, Brisbane reserves and Gold Coast reserves, and two stand-alone senior clubs from Queensland: Gold Coast based Southport Sharks and Brisbane based Aspley Hornets. Sydney based Sydney University was offered a licence before ultimately declining, due to the cost to compete being too high. The Canberra Demons and Brisbane based Redland both declined to join the merged competition before licenses were offered.

Aspley ultimately departed at the end of the 2021 VFL season.
