= 2019 NEAFL season =

9th season of the North East Australian Football League

Overview
- Date: 6 April – 15 September 2019
- Teams: 10
- Premiers: Brisbane; 4th premiership
- Runners-up: Southport; 1st runners-up result
- Minor premiers: Brisbane; 2nd minor premiership
- NEAFL MVP: Jake Bartholomaeus (Sydney University – 73 votes)
- Leading goalkicker: Matthew Hammelmann (Redland – 66 goals)

The 2019 NEAFL season was the ninth and final season of the North East Australian Football League (NEAFL). The season featured 18 clubs and ran from 6 April to 15 September, comprising an 18-match home-and-away season over 21 rounds, followed by a three-week finals series.

Brisbane won the premiership for the fourth time, after defeating Southport by 76 points in the 2019 NEAFL Grand Final. It was a perfect season for Brisbane, which won all 20 of its home-and-away and finals series matches.

== Ladder ==
Pos	Team	Pld	W	L	D	PF	PA	PP	Pts	Qualification
1	Brisbane	18	18	0	0	2206	982	224.6	72	Finals series
2	Southport	18	13	5	0	1533	1417	108.2	52	Finals series
3	Aspley	18	10	8	0	1669	1367	122.1	40	Finals series
4	Sydney	18	10	8	0	1502	1502	100.0	40	Finals series
5	Sydney University	18	9	8	1	1551	1557	99.6	38	Finals series
6	Greater Western Sydney	18	9	9	0	1292	1554	83.1	36	Finals series
7	Gold Coast	18	8	10	0	1336	1446	92.4	32	
8	Canberra Demons	18	7	10	1	1590	1655	96.1	30	
9	Redland	18	3	15	0	1518	1881	80.7	12	
10	NT Thunder	18	2	16	0	1252	2088	60.0	8	

Source: Australian Football
Rules for classification: 1) points; 2) percentage; 3) number of points for.

== Finals ==
=== Elimination Finals ===
	Elimination Finals
Saturday 31 August (11:30 am)	Sydney Swans 15.11 (101)	def.	Sydney University 14.8 (92)	Sydney Showground Stadium	Scorecard
Saturday 31 August (1:30 pm)	Aspley 9.14 (68)	def.	GWS Giants 6.10 (46)	Graham Road Oval	Scorecard

=== Preliminary Finals ===
	Preliminary Finals
Saturday 7 September (1:30 pm)	Southport 14.10 (94)	def.	Aspley 9.10 (64)	Fankhauser Reserve	Scorecard
Sunday 8 September (1:00 pm)	Brisbane Lions 11.16 (82)	def.	Sydney Swans 4.8 (32)	South Pine Sports Complex	Scorecard

=== Grand Final ===
	Grand Final
Sunday 15 September (1:00 pm)	Brisbane Lions 20.15 (135)	def.	Southport 8.11 (59)	Fankhauser Reserve	Scorecard
