= North East Australian Football League =

Second division Australian rules football league

- Sport: Australian rules football
- Founded: 2010; 16 years ago
- First season: 2011
- Folded: 2020
- No. of teams: 9 (final season)
- Country: Australia
- Confederation: AFL NSW/ACT; AFL QLD; AFL NT
- Last champion: Brisbane (2019)
- Most titles: Brisbane (4)
- Sponsor: Toyota
- Level on pyramid: 2
- Related competitions: Australian Football League
- Website: neafl.com.au

The North East Australian Football League (NEAFL /ˈniːfəl/ NEE-fəl) was an Australian rules football league in New South Wales, Queensland, the Australian Capital Territory and the Northern Territory. The league was formed in November 2010, and its inaugural competition was in 2011. It was a second division league, sitting below the national Australian Football League (AFL) and featured the reserves teams of the region's four AFL clubs playing alongside six non-AFL affiliated NEAFL senior teams. Nine NEAFL seasons were contested between 2011 and 2019, before the 2020 season was cancelled due to the COVID-19 pandemic, and the league was amalgamated into the Victorian Football League from 2021.

== History ==
The NEAFL was formed at the end of 2010 primarily as an amalgamation of the two major football leagues in Australia's north-east - the Queensland Australian Football League, based in South-East Queensland and including one team from the Northern Territory, and AFL Canberra, based around ACT, and including one team from Sydney (the reserves team of the AFL's Sydney Swans).

The two leagues were converted to NEAFL conferences: the Northern Conference, serving Queensland and the Northern Territory, and the Eastern Conference, serving New South Wales and the ACT. Teams from the two conferences played matches against each other throughout the home-and-away season, before each conference staged a separate finals competition to determine both a northern premier and an eastern premier. The two premiers then played each other in the NEAFL Grand Final.

Two new teams also joined the competition for its inaugural season in 2011: the reserves team of Gold Coast Suns (whose senior team joined the AFL in the same season); and the senior team of the Greater Western Sydney Giants, which was preparing to join the AFL in 2012.

In 2012, two more clubs joined the Eastern Conference from the AFL Sydney competition: Sydney Hills and Sydney University. With Greater Western Sydney's senior team joining the AFL, its NEAFL side became a reserves team in partnership with, and under the name of the University of Western Sydney.

On 11 May 2013, the NEAFL Northern Conference played an interstate game against South Australia who represent the South Australian National Football League (SANFL). The game, played at the City Mazda Stadium in Adelaide resulted in a 21.14 (140) to 9.4 (58) win over the NEAFL North, with SA's higher fitness level the main difference between the two sides.

On 8 June 2013, the NEAFL Eastern Conference played an interstate game against Tasmania who represent the TSL (Tasmanian State League). Tasmania won 15.11 (101) - 8.13 (61).

A major restructure of the league was announced for the 2014 season. Five clubs left the competition and the conference system was abolished. Broadbeach, Labrador, Morningside and Mt. Gravatt joined a re-constructed QAFL, while Tuggeranong went back to the AFL Canberra Division One competition. The possibility of a North Queensland side entering the competition for 2014 was considered but ruled out.

Due to the financial challenges of participating in the competition and a proposal from the AFL for the existing Canberra clubs to contribute to a single Canberra team, Belconnen, Queanbeyan and the Sydney Hills Eagles chose to leave the NEAFL at the end of the 2014 season. The ongoing desire by the AFL for a single Canberra team led Ainslie to withdraw at the end of the 2015 season. Both Canberra clubs - Ainslie and Eastlake - had a NEAFL licence until the end of 2016, but Ainslie withdrew from the competition after the AFL rejected their proposal to be Canberra's sole team from 2017. The AFL wanted Canberra's team to be either a combined Ainslie-Eastlake side or a representative team funded largely by all the local clubs in the Canberra area.

Two teams changed their names prior to the 2016 season. Eastlake's NEAFL side started to play as the Canberra Demons in an attempt to be seen as Canberra's representative team in the NEAFL competition. The club wishes to provide a clear AFL pathway for local talent and to get rid of the baggage between other clubs in the ACT. As part of this decision the team also adopted a blue and gold guernsey for home games, reflecting the territory's traditional colours. The team still wears Eastlake's red and black colours in away matches. The Greater Western Sydney reserves team became known as the Western Sydney University Giants to reflect the re-branding of the University of Western Sydney.

At the end of the 2019 season, AFL Northern Territory announced the disbanding of the NT Thunder, citing financial and logistical difficulties. The competition scope therefore decreased to capture Queensland, New South Wales and the Australian Capital Territory. The 2020 season was then cancelled altogether, owing to the infeasibility of interstate travel during the COVID-19 pandemic.

In August 2020, the AFL announced that the NEAFL would be amalgamated into the Victorian Football League in 2021, bringing an end to the competition's nine-season history. The NEAFL's clubs will all have the opportunity to join the Victorian Football League, though given the finances associated with travel the independent non-AFL clubs are considered unlikely to join the league.

== Clubs ==
Nine clubs were scheduled to play in the cancelled 2020 NEAFL season. An additional 10 had participated in the competition since it was founded, with NT Thunder the last to disband at the end of the 2019 season.

=== Final clubs ===
Club	Colours	Moniker	State/ Territory	Home venue	Former league	Est.	Years in NEAFL	Premierships		Fate
Club	Colours	Moniker	State/ Territory	Home venue	Former league	Est.	Years in NEAFL	Total	Years	Fate
Aspley		Hornets	QLD	Graham Road Oval, Carseldine	QAFL	1964	2011–2020	1	2014	Moved to VFL in 2021, Returned to QAFL in 2022
Brisbane (R)		Lions	QLD	South Pine Sports Complex, Brendale	QAFL	1998	2011–2020	4	2012, 2013, 2017, 2019	Moved to VFL in 2021
Canberra		Demons	ACT	Manuka Oval, Griffith	ACTAFL	1991	2011–2020	0	-	Returned to ACTAFL in 2021 as Eastlake
Gold Coast (R)		Suns	QLD	People First Stadium, Carrara	–	2011	2011–2020	0	-	Moved to VFL in 2021
Greater Western Sydney (R)*		Giants	NSW	Engie Stadium, Sydney Olympic Park	–	2012	2012–2020	1	2016	Moved to VFL in 2021
Redland		Bombers	QLD	Totally Workwear Park, Victoria Point	QAFL	1966	2011–2020	0	-	Merged with Victoria Point to form Redland-Victoria Point in QAFL in 2021
Southport		Sharks	QLD	Fankhauser Reserve, Southport	QAFL	1961	2011–2020	1	2018	Moved to VFL in 2021
Sydney (R)		Swans	NSW	Tramway Oval, Moore Park	ACTAFL	1900	2011–2020	0	-	Moved to VFL in 2021
Sydney University		Students	NSW	Henson Park, Marrickville	NSWAFL	1887	2012–2020	0	-	Returned to AFL Sydney in 2021
(R) Denotes that the club is the reserves team of a senior club of the Australian Football League * Greater Western Sydney played as University of Western Sydney/Western Sydney University

=== Former clubs ===
Club	Colours	Moniker	State/ Territory	Home venue	Former League	Est.	Years in NEAFL	Premierships		Fate
Club	Colours	Moniker	State/ Territory	Home venue	Former League	Est.	Years in NEAFL	Total	Years	Fate
Ainslie		Tricolours	ACT	Alan Ray Oval, Ainslie	ACTAFL	1927	2011–2015	0	-	Returned to ACTAFL in 2016
Belconnen		Magpies	ACT	Adero Law Nest, Holt	ACTAFL	1987	2011–2014	0	-	Returned to ACTAFL in 2015
Broadbeach		Cats	QLD	Subaru Oval, Mermaid Waters	QAFL	1971	2011–2013	0	-	Returned to QAFL in 2014
Greater Western Sydney (S)		Giants	NSW	Engie Stadium, Sydney Olympic Park	–	2009	2011	0	-	Moved to AFL in 2012
Labrador		Tigers	QLD	Cooke Murphy Oval, Labrador	QAFL	1964	2011–2013	0	-	Returned to QAFL in 2014
Morningside		Panthers	QLD	Jack Esplen Oval, Hawthorne	QAFL	1947	2011–2013	0	-	Returned to QAFL in 2014
Mount Gravatt		Vultures	QLD	Dittmer Park, Upper Mt-Gravatt	QAFL	1964	2011–2013	0	-	Returned to QAFL in 2014
Northern Territory		Thunder	NT	TIO Stadium, Marrara	QAFL	2008	2011–2019	2	2011, 2015	Folded after 2019 season
Queanbeyan		Tigers	NSW	Margaret Donoghoe Sportsground, Karabar	ACTAFL	1925	2011–2014	0	-	Returned to ACTAFL in 2015
Sydney Hills (East Coast)		Eagles	NSW	Bruce Purser Reserve, Kellyville	NSWAFL	1976	2012–2014	0	-	Returned to NSWAFL in 2015
Tuggeranong (Tuggeranong Valley)		Hawks	ACT	Greenway Oval, Greenway	ACTAFL	1968	2011–2013	0	-	Returned to ACTAFL in 2014
(S) denotes clubs that joined the AFL

== League awards ==
Current league awards have been instituted since 2014.

=== Premiers ===
Year	Premiers		Runners-up		Venue	Date	Crowd
Year	Club	Score	Club	Score	Venue	Date	Crowd
2011	NT Thunder (1)	16.18 (114)	Ainslie (1)	13.14 (92)	Traeger Park	24 September 2011	
2012	Brisbane (1)	22.12 (144)	Queanbeyan (1)	11.9 (75)	Manuka Oval	22 September 2012	500
2013	Brisbane (2)	12.9 (81)	Sydney (1)	10.13 (73)	Graham Road Oval	21 September 2013	
2014	Aspley (1)	15.12 (102)	Sydney (2)	15.10 (100)	Graham Road Oval	13 September 2014	
2015	NT Thunder (2)	11.15 (81)	Aspley (1)	11.14 (80)	Marrara Oval	19 September 2015	5,889
2016	WSU Giants (1)	11.16 (82)	Sydney (3)	11.12 (78)	Blacktown ISP Oval	11 September 2016	
2017	Brisbane (3)	12.13 (85)	Sydney (4)	10.22 (82)	Sydney Cricket Ground	9 September 2017	
2018	Southport (1)	14.6 (90)	Sydney (5)	5.5 (35)	Fankhauser Reserve	16 September 2018	
2019	Brisbane (4)	20.15 (135)	Southport (1)	8.11 (59)	Fankhauser Reserve	15 September 2019	

=== NEAFL MVP award ===
Season	Player	Club	Votes
2014	Matthew Payne	Aspley	102
2015	Tom Young	Sydney University	86
2016	Matthew Payne	Aspley	87
2017	Jordan Keras	Southport	78
2018	Matthew Payne	Aspley	95

=== NEAFL Rising Star ===
Season	Player	Club
2014	Paul Hunter	Redland
2015	Matt Uebergang	Redland
2016	Hayden Bertoli-Simmonds	Redland
2017	Adam Sambono	NT Thunder

=== NEAFL leading goal kicker ===
Season	Player	Club	Goals
2014	Cleve Hughes	Redland	79
2015	Darren Ewing	NT Thunder	87
2016	Darren Ewing	NT Thunder	63
2017	Darren Ewing	NT Thunder	61
2018	Matt Hammelmann	Redland	60

=== NEAFL coach of the year ===
Season	Player	Club
2014	Xavier Clarke	NT Thunder
2015	Brett Hand	GWS Giants
2016	Rhyce Shaw	Sydney Swans
2017	Tom Morrison	Sydney University

== Former league awards ==
=== Grogan Medal (2011–2013) ===
Awarded to the best and fairest players in the Northern Conference.

Season	Winner	Club	Votes
2011	Matthew Payne; Cameron Ilett	Southport; NT Thunder	23
2012	Ryan Davey; Fraser Pope; Tom Salter	Labrador; Southport; Redland	14
2013	Haydn Kiel	Southport	21

=== Mulrooney Medal (2011–2013) ===
For the best and fairest players in the Eastern Conference.

Season	Winner	Club	Votes
2011	Daniel Currie; Jarred Moore	Sydney Swans; Sydney Swans	16
2012	Shane Harris	Belconnen	16
2013	James Bennett	Belconnen	21

=== NEAFL (Northern) Rising Star award (2011–2013) ===
Awarded to an outstanding young player in the Northern Conference.

Season	Winner	Club
2011	Ross Tungatalum	NT Thunder
2012	Andrew Boston	Broadbeach
2013	Josh Smith	Morningside

=== NEAFL (Eastern) Rising Star award (2011–2013) ===
Awarded to an outstanding young player in the Eastern Conference

Season	Winner	Club
2011	Hayden Armstrong	Eastlake
2012	Liam Flaherty	Eastlake
2013	Brent Macleod	Tuggeranong

=== Ray Hughson Medal (2011–2013) ===
Highest goalkicker award for player in Northern Conference

Season	Winner	Club	Goals
2011	Darren Ewing	NT Thunder	115
2012	Tom Kavanagh	Queanbeyan	92
2013	Darren Ewing	NT Thunder	94

== Grounds ==
This list includes grounds where teams had agreements in place to play home matches but were not full-time tenants of those grounds; in these cases, the club is shown in italics.

Ground	Image	Other names	Suburb	State	Capacity	Seasons used		Tenant(s)
Ground	Image	Other names	Suburb	State	Capacity	First	Last	Tenant(s)
Blacktown ISP Oval			Rooty Hill	NSW	10,000	2011	2020	Greater Western Sydney; Sydney
Carrara Stadium		Metricon Stadium	Carrara	QLD	25,000	2011	2020	Gold Coast
Cooke-Murphy Oval			Labrador	QLD	8,000	2011	2013	Labrador
Fankhauser Reserve			Southport	QLD	8,000	2011	2020	Southport
Manuka Oval			Griffith	ACT	15,000	2011	2020	Canberra/Eastlake
Marrara Oval		TIO Stadium	Marrara	NT	12,215	2011	2019	NT Thunder
Salk Oval			Palm Beach	QLD	4,000	2015	2015	Southport
Sydney Cricket Ground			Moore Park	NSW	48,000	2011	2018	Sydney
Sydney Showground Stadium		Škoda Stadium; Spotless Stadium; GIANTS Stadium	Sydney Olympic Park	NSW	23,500	2011	2020	Greater Western Sydney
Tramway Oval		Lakeside Oval	Moore Park	NSW	1,000	2011	2020	Sydney

== See also ==
- List of Australian rules football leagues in Australia
- AFL Canberra
- Queensland Australian Football League
- AFL Sydney
