= Fankhauser Reserve =

Australian rules football venue in Southport, Queensland

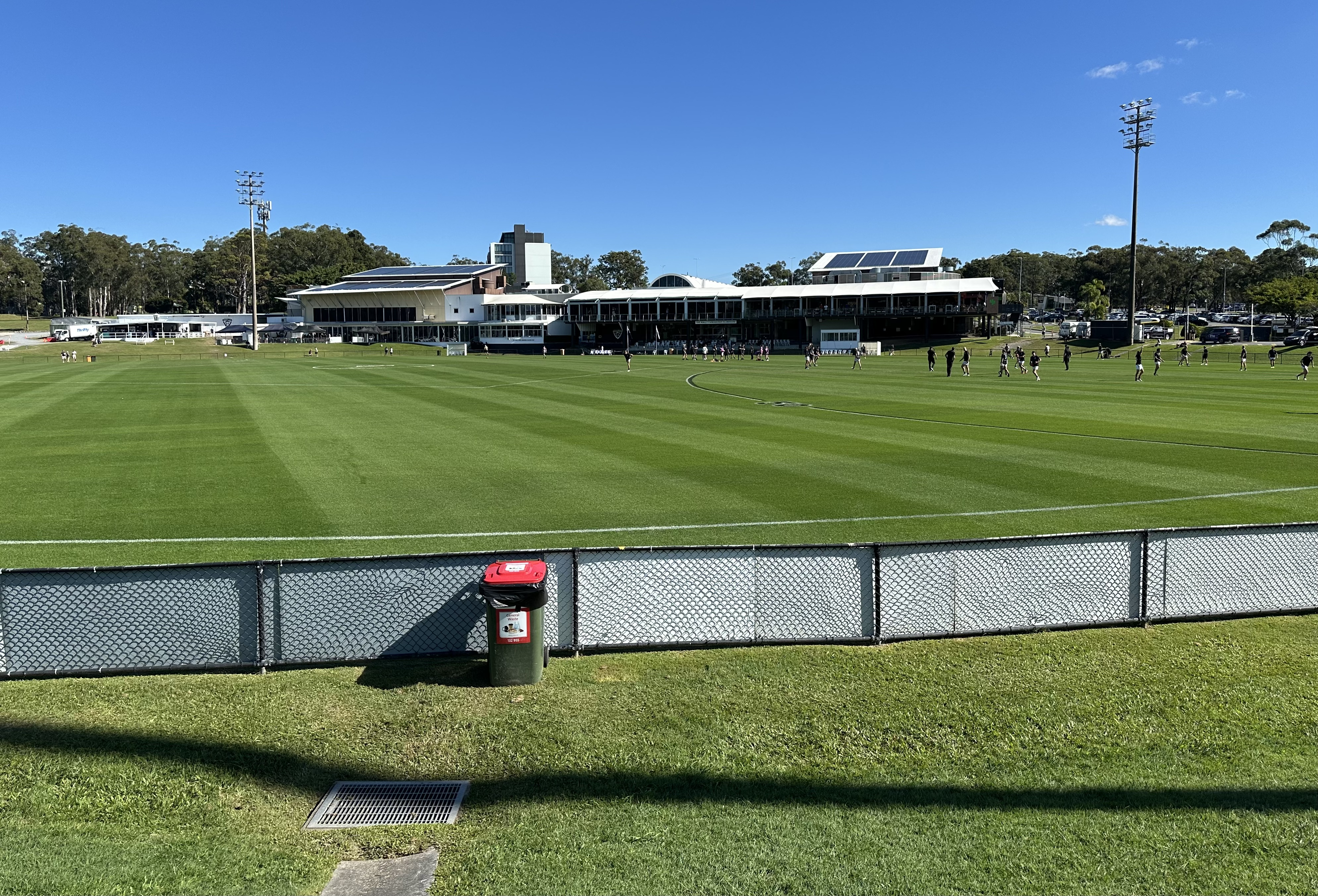
- Fankhauser Reserve in June 2026
- Interactive map of Fankhauser Reserve
- Address: Cnr Musgrave & Olsen Ave; Southport, Queensland
- Coordinates: 27.95552°S 153.38586°E
- Capacity: 8,000
- Record attendance: Sporting events: 4,053 (Gold Coast vs Brisbane, 13 March 2011); Other events: 37,000 (Laneway Festival, 7 February 2026)
- Public transit: University Hospital; Griffith University; Musgrave Ave

Construction
- Groundbreaking: 1988; 38 years ago
- Opened: 5 April 1989; 37 years ago
- Cost: A$2.7 million

Tenant
- Southport Sharks (1987–present)

Fankhauser Reserve (officially known as Wally Fankhauser Sports Reserve) is an Australian rules football venue in the Gold Coast suburb of Southport. It is the home of the Southport Sharks, which competes in the Victorian Football League (VFL) and the QAFL Women's (QAFLW).

== History ==
Southport initially played its home matches at Labrador Sports Reserve when it joined the Gold Coast Australian Football League (GCAFL) in 1961, before moving to Owen Park for the 1964 season.

In 1987, the club's board of directors submitted a proposal to the Gold Coast City Council to build a professional Australian rules football ground and licensed club on the 31 acres of land located on the corner of Musgrave Avenue and Olsen Avenue. The submission was approved and the club was granted a 50-year lease on the site.

Construction of the $2.7 million development began in 1988. During the construction, Southport requested that Gold Coast City Council extend its lease at Owen Park until 30 December 1989 because a "major sponsor [was] no longer interested in the project", although no lease extension eventuated. The club spent the $800,000 it had in its bank account as part of the construction.

Fankhauser Reserve was completed in February 1989 and officially opened by Southport president Doc Mackenzie on 5 April 1989. The ground was named after Wally Fankhauser, the club's then-vice-president, who donated $2.2 million towards the facility. The first match at the ground was played on 1 May 1989, with the Sharks defeating Mayne by 59 points.

The Gold Coast Suns played six matches at Fankhauser Reserve during the 2010 VFL season. Gold Coast also played regular home matches at the ground while competing in the North East Australian Football League (NEAFL) between 2011 and 2019. Several pre-season Australian Football League (AFL) matches were held at the ground, including one during the 2011 NAB Challenge in front of a record crowd of 4,053 people.

Fankhauser Reserve was scheduled to host an AFL Women's (AFLW) match between Gold Coast and Adelaide during round 7 of the 2020 season, before it was cancelled because of the COVID-19 pandemic.

In addition to Australian rules football, Fankhauser Reserve has also hosted soccer matches. A pre-season friendly between Brisbane Roar FC and Melbourne Victory FC was played at the ground on 19 August 2015. The Laneway music festival was held at the ground on 7 February 2026, attracting a crowd of 37,000 people for the ten-hour event.

=== Proposed redevelopment ===
In November 2021, Southport announced a master plan for a redevelopment of Fankhauser Reserve and the wider club precinct, which would see the ground become a boutique stadium with a capacity of between 8,000 and 10,000 people. The site would also include three 20-storey residential towers, a four-storey sports science and recovery centre, and an extension of the current clubhouse facilities. Further plans were revealed in November 2025.

== Transport access ==
Fankhauser Reserve is primarily serviced by the G:link light rail line, with Gold Coast University Hospital and Griffith University stations located approximately eight minutes' walk away from the venue. Bus route 715 stops on Musgrave Avenue in front of the Southport Sharks precinct.

In June 2026, the Queensland state government announced an extension of the light rail line to Biggera Waters, which would see a new station (provisionally known as Musgrave Avenue) located outside Fankhauser Reserve.

== Records ==
=== Attendance ===
Attendances from state league matches are often not recorded. This list includes known attendances numbers.

| # | Crowd | Game | Date | Ref |
|---|---|---|---|---|
| 1 | 4,053 | Gold Coast vs Brisbane Lions (2011 NAB Challenge) | 13 March 2011 | |
| 2 | 4,000 | Southport vs Gold Coast (2022 VFL preliminary final) | 11 September 2022 | |
| 3 | 2,859 | Gold Coast vs Sydney (2011 NAB Challenge) | 5 March 2011 | |
| 4 | 2,000 | Southport vs Gold Coast (Round 6, 2021 VFL season) | 21 May 2021 | |
