= Eastlake Football Club =

Eastlake Demons

Names
- Full name: Eastlake Football Club Demons
- Nickname: Demons

2025 AFL Canberra season
- After finals: 1st (Premiers)
- Home-and-away season: 1st

Club details
- Founded: 1926; 100 years ago
- Colours
- Competition: AFL Canberra
- Coach: Jeremy Rowe
- Captain: Aaron Bruce
- Premierships: AFL Canberra (2); 2001, 2025; CANFL (18); 1928, 1930, 1933, 1934, 1937, 1942, 1945, 1948, 1957, 1960, 1962, 1963, 1964, 1965, 1966, 1972, 1976, 1978
- Ground: Phillip Oval (capacity: 7,500)
- Training ground: Phillip Oval (7,500)

Uniforms
Home	Away	Heritage

Other information
- Official website: https://www.eastlakedemons.com.au/

The Eastlake Demons is a semi-professional Australian rules football club based in the inner-south of Canberra, in the Australian Capital Territory. The club has formerly been known as City (1941-1944), the Southern District Demons (1991-1998), and the Canberra Demons (2016-2020).

The senior team competed in the North East Australian Football League (NEAFL) from the league's founding in 2011 until it was absorbed by the Victorian Football League (VFL) in 2021. Canberra declined to join the expanded VFL.

== History ==
=== Canberra Australian National Football League ===
The Eastlake Football Club was established in 1926. The club was mostly made up of tradesmen who had moved to Canberra from southern states. During the Second World War, Eastlake would briefly merge with the Manuka Football Club, and played under the name City.

On 15 August 1953, Eastlake's new clubrooms were opened by Robert Menzies. The clubrooms had an estimated value of £4,000.

Between 1962 and 1966 the club held an unrivaled dominance over the Canberra Australian National Football League, winning five consecutive premierships. With Alex Jesaulenko playing for the club for three of those premierships. During the late 1960s the club first established a women's team, which played occasional social games.

The club won their last Grand Final before the AFL Canberra era in 1978. Fortunes changed at the club in the 1980s after the they lost three consecutive grand finals in 1982, 1983, and 1984. In 1991 the club merged again with the Manuka Football Club to become the Southern District Demons.

=== AFL Canberra and NEAFL ===
In 2011 Eastlake was one of the founding clubs of the North East Australian Football League.

In January 2016, the league announced that Eastlake would rebrand and now be known as Canberra, though the Eastlake name would continue to be used in local competitions.

In 2025, The Eastlake Demons First Grade Men's side, broke a 24 year Premiership drought by defeating the Queanbeyan Tigers by 37 points on 6 September 2025.

=== Guernseys ===
The club's current home guernsey is similar to that of Essendon, though in the past the club has worn gurnseys similar to South Melbounre, and a unique design during their time in the NEAFL.

==== Uniform evolution ====
Eastlake; 1926–40	City; 1941–44	Eastlake; 1945–90	Eastlake; 1991–2015	Canberra; 2016–2020	Eastlake; 2021-present

=== VFL/AFL Players ===
The following Eastlake players have played in the Australian Football League or its redecessor the Victorian Football League:

- Craig Bolton
- Tony Bourke
- Josh Bruce
- Nathan Clarke
- Brad Fuller
- Allan Hird, Jr.
- Alex Jesaulenko
- Aaron Rogers
- Jeremy Turner
- Rodney Broadhurst
- Harry Himmelberg
- Tom Green

== See also ==
- Manuka Oval
- AFL Canberra
- Manuka Football Club
