= 2012 NEAFL season =

- Teams: 19
- Premiers: Brisbane; 1st premiership
- Minor premiers: Queanbeyan; 1st minor premiership
- Grogan Medallist: Ryan Davey; Labrador (14 votes); Fraser Pope; Southport (14 votes); Tom Salter; Redland (14 votes)
- Mulrooney Medallist: Shane Harris; Belconnen (16 votes)
- Leading goalkicker: James Kavanagh; Queanbeyan (84 goals)
- Matches played: 184

The 2012 NEAFL season was the second season of the North East Australian Football League (NEAFL).

== League structure ==
The league is split into two divisions called the Northern Conference and the Eastern Conference.

In 2012 two new teams were added to the Eastern Conference from the AFL Sydney competition - Sydney Hills and Sydney University. With the admission of Greater Western Sydney to the AFL, the club's NEAFL side became a reserves team and played under the name of University of Western Sydney.

== Participating clubs ==
Eastern Conference Participating Clubs
Club	Location	Home ground
Ainslie	Canberra, ACT	Ainslie Oval
Belconnen	Canberra, ACT	Manuka Oval
Eastlake	Canberra, ACT	Manuka Oval
Queanbeyan	Canberra, ACT	Dairy Farmers Park
Sydney Hills	Sydney, NSW	Bruce Purser Reserve
Sydney	Sydney, NSW	Sydney Cricket Ground
Sydney University	Sydney, NSW	Sydney University Oval
Tuggeranong	Canberra, ACT	Greenway Oval
UWS Giants	Sydney, NSW	Blacktown Olympic Park

Northern Conference Participating Clubs
Club	Location	Home ground
Aspley	Brisbane, QLD	Graham Road
Brisbane	Brisbane, QLD	Gabba
Broadbeach	Gold Coast, QLD	H & A Oval
Gold Coast	Gold Coast, QLD	Metricon Stadium
Labrador	Gold Coast, QLD	Cooke-Murphy Oval
Morningside	Brisbane, QLD	Jack Esplen Oval
Mount Gravatt	Brisbane, QLD	Dittmer Park
NT Thunder	Darwin, NT	TIO Stadium
Redland	Brisbane, QLD	Tidbold Park
Southport	Gold Coast, QLD	Fankhauser Reserve

== Regular season ==
=== Round 1 ===
	Eastern Conference
Saturday, 24 March (11:00 am)	Sydney Hills 14.12 (94)	def.	Sydney University 12.9 (81)	Bruce Purser Reserve
Saturday, 24 March (3:50 pm)	UWS Giants 4.10 (34)	def. by	Sydney 23.13 (151)	ANZ Stadium
Sunday, 25 March (2:00 pm)	Ainslie 22.12 (144)	def.	Belconnen 18.8 (116)	Ainslie Oval
Sunday, 25 March (2:00 pm)	Queanbeyan 30.20 (200)	def.	Tuggeranong 7.10 (52)	Dairy Farmers Park
	Bye; Eastlake

	Northern Conference
Saturday, 24 March (1:30 pm)	Mount Gravatt 11.9 (75)	def. by	Aspley 20.11 (131)	Dittmer Park
Saturday, 24 March (1:30 pm)	Labrador 14.10 (94)	def.	Broadbeach 13.11 (89)	Cooke-Murphy Reserve
Saturday, 24 March (1:30 pm)	Redland 14.16 (100)	def. by	Southport 25.9 (159)	Tidbold Park
Saturday, 24 March (6:00 pm)	NT Thunder 21.16 (142)	def.	Morningside 8.7 (55)	TIO Stadium
	Bye; Brisbane, Gold Coast

=== Round 2 ===
	Eastern Conference
Saturday, 31 March (11:45 am)	Ainslie 6.13 (49)	def. by	Labrador 20.14 (134)	Ainslie Oval
Saturday, 31 March (2:00 pm)	Sydney Hills 18.10 (118)	def. by	Queanbeyan 20.21 (141)	Bruce Purser Reserve
Saturday, 31 March (6:00 pm)	Tuggeranong 11.9 (75)	def. by	Eastlake 20.15 (135)	Greenway Oval
Sunday, 1 April (1:00 pm)	Sydney University 14.15 (99)	def. by	Belconnen 18.17 (125)	Henson Park
	Bye; Sydney, UWS Giants

	Northern Conference
Saturday, 31 March (10:30 am)	Southport 10.5 (65)	def. by	Gold Coast 19.17 (131)	Fankhauser Reserve
Saturday, 31 March (11:30 am)	Broadbeach 8.13 (61)	def. by	Brisbane 18.16 (124)	H & A Oval
Saturday, 31 March (1:30 pm)	Aspley 6.13 (49)	def. by	NT Thunder 20.14 (134)	Graham Road
Saturday, 31 March (1:30 pm)	Mount Gravatt 11.17 (83)	def. by	Redland 19.19 (133)	Dittmer Park
	Bye; Morningside

=== Round 3 ===
	Eastern Conference
Friday, 6 April (5:00 pm)	Tuggeranong 14.11 (95)	drew with	Belconnen 14.11 (95)	Greenway Oval
Saturday, 7 April (10:35 am)	Sydney 7.13 (55)	def. by	Gold Coast 13.13 (91)	Sydney Cricket Ground
Saturday, 7 April (12:00 pm)	Ainslie 17.12 (114)	def. by	Sydney Hills 19.12 (126)	Ainslie Oval
Saturday, 7 April (12:00 pm)	Sydney University 11.16 (82)	def. by	Eastlake 15.19 (109)	Sydney University Oval
Saturday, 7 April (1:00 pm)	UWS Giants 12.9 (81)	def. by	Brisbane 15.19 (109)	Blacktown International Sportspark
	Bye; Queanbeyan

	Northern Conference
Saturday, 7 April (1:30 pm)	Labrador 19.8 (122)	def.	Mount Gravatt 14.4 (88)	Cooke-Murphy Oval
Saturday, 7 April (1:30 pm)	Morningside 14.10 (94)	def. by	Broadbeach 16.9 (105)	Jack Esplen Oval
Saturday, 7 April (1:30 pm)	Redland 22.12 (144)	def.	Aspley 14.12 (96)	Tidbold Park
Saturday, 7 April (3:20 pm)	NT Thunder 9.10 (64)	def. by	Southport 12.10 (82)	Traeger Park

=== Round 4 ===
	Eastern Conference
Saturday, 14 April (11:45 am)	Ainslie 17.9 (111)	def.	Sydney 12.13 (85)	Ainslie Oval
Saturday, 14 April (2:00 pm)	Tuggeranong 16.8 (104)	def. by	Sydney University 16.10 (106)	Greenway Oval
Saturday, 14 April (2:00 pm)	Queanbeyan 19.7 (121)	def.	Eastlake 13.7 (85)	Dairy Farmers Park
Saturday, 14 April (4:15 pm)	UWS Giants 19.16 (130)	def.	Sydney Hills 13316 (94)	Blacktown International Sportspark
	Bye; Belconnen

	Northern Conference
Saturday, 14 April (1:30 pm)	Southport 16.11 (107)	def.	Mount Gravatt 8.12 (60)	Fankhauser Reserve
Saturday, 14 April (1:30 pm)	Aspley 16.15 (111)	def.	Labrador 13.9 (87)	Graham Road
Saturday, 14 April (1:30 pm)	Broadbeach 17.11 (113)	drew with	Redland 17.11 (113)	H & A Oval
Saturday, 14 April (3:20 pm)	NT Thunder 11.10 (76)	def. by	Brisbane 12.12 (84)	Traeger Park
Saturday, 14 April (3:30 pm)	Gold Coast 17.24 (126)	def.	Morningside 11.10 (76)	Metricon Stadium

=== Round 5 ===
	Eastern Conference
Saturday, 21 April (1:45 pm)	UWS Giants 14.14 (98)	def.	Queanbeyan 13.16 (94)	Blacktown International Sportspark
Saturday, 21 April (2:10 pm)	Sydney Hills 20.16 (136)	def.	Belconnen 16.6 (102)	Bruce Purser Reserve
Sunday, 22 April (11:35 am)	Sydney 33.21 (219)	def.	Tuggeranong 6.5 (41)	Sydney Cricket Ground
	Bye; Ainslie, Sydney University

	Northern Conference
Saturday, 21 April (1:00 pm)	Mount Gravatt 14.18 (102)	def.	Eastlake 12.15 (87)	Dittmer Park
Saturday, 21 April (1:30 pm)	Brisbane 11.11 (77)	def. by	Gold Coast 14.9 (93)	Leyshon Park
Saturday, 21 April (1:30 pm)	Morningside 11.16 (82)	def. by	Labrador 25.17 (167)	Jack Esplen Oval
Saturday, 21 April (1:30 pm)	Redland 19.13 (127)	def. by	NT Thunder 22.16 (148)	Tidbold Park
	Bye; Aspley, Broadbeach, Southport

=== Round 6 ===
	Eastern Conference
Saturday, 28 April (9:30 am)	Eastlake 15.13 (103)	def.	UWS Giants 13.7 (85)	Manuka Oval
Sunday, 29 April (11:45 am)	Queanbeyan 20.15 (135)	def.	Sydney University 8.7 (55)	Dairy Farmers Park
Sunday, 29 April (11:45 am)	Tuggeranong 14.12 (96)	def. by	Sydney Hills 19.22 (136)	Greenway Oval
Sunday, 29 April (2:00 pm)	Belconnen 13.7 (85)	def. by	Ainslie 12.19 (91)	Manuka Oval

	Northern Conference
Saturday, 28 April (1:30 pm)	Aspley 2.6 (18)	def. by	Southport 16.11 (107)	Graham Road Oval
Saturday, 28 April (1:30 pm)	Broadbeach 25.12 (162)	def.	Mount Gravatt 13.6 (84)	H & A Oval
Saturday, 28 April (1:30 pm)	Labrador 8.6 (54)	def.	Gold Coast 6.6 (42)	Cooke-Murphy Oval
Saturday, 28 April (6:00 pm)	NT Thunder 16.16 (112)	def.	Sydney 12.18 (90)	TIO Stadium
Sunday, 29 April (1:30 pm)	Morningside 5.7 (37)	def. by	Brisbane 16.22 (118)	Jack Esplen Oval
	Bye; Redland

=== Round 7 ===
	Eastern Conference
Saturday, 5 May (11:45 am)	Tuggeranong 13.6 (84)	def. by	Redland 14.18 (102)	Greenway Oval
Saturday, 5 May (11:45 am)	Belconnen 13.10 (88)	def. by	Morningside 13.13 (91)	Manuka Oval
Saturday, 5 May (12:00 pm)	Sydney University 5.6 (36)	def. by	Sydney 38.11 (239)	Blacktown International Sportspark
Saturday, 5 May (2:00 pm)	Ainslie 9.11 (65)	def. by	Eastlake 17.7 (109)	Ainslie Oval
	Bye; Queanbeyan, UWS Giants, Sydney Hills

	Northern Conference
Saturday, 5 May (12:30 pm)	Gold Coast 10.14 (74)	def. by	NT Thunder 13.14 (92)	Metricon Stadium
Saturday, 5 May (1:30 pm)	Brisbane 20.18 (138)	def.	Aspley 16.10 (106)	Leyshon Park
Sunday, 6 May (1:30 pm)	Southport 18.13 (121)	def.	Broadbeach 11.9 (75)	Fankhauser Reserve
	Bye; Labrador, Mount Gravatt

=== Round 8 ===
	Eastern Conference
Saturday, 12 May (9:30 am)	UWS Giants 13.12 (90)	def.	Gold Coast 10.15 (75)	Manuka Oval
Sunday, 13 May (11:45 am)	Queanbeyan 20.17 (137)	def.	Sydney Hills 9.10 (64)	Dairy Farmers Park
Sunday, 13 May (12:00 pm)	Sydney University 13.10 (88)	def. by	Ainslie 18.16 (124)	Sydney University Oval
Sunday, 13 May (2:00 pm)	Eastlake 20.11 (131)	def.	Belconnen 7.9 (51)	Manuka Oval
	Bye; Tuggeranong

	Northern Conference
Saturday, 12 May (1:30 pm)	Brisbane 12.20 (86)	def. by	Sydney 18.12 (120)	Leyshon Park
Saturday, 12 May (1:30 pm)	Morningside 11.10 (76)	def. by	Southport 21.14 (140)	Jack Esplen Oval
Saturday, 12 May (1:30 pm)	Redland 14.16 (100)	def. by	Labrador 20.9 (129)	Tidbold Park
Saturday, 12 May (3:20 pm)	NT Thunder 13.9 (87)	def. by	Broadbeach 14.16 (100)	Traeger Park
Sunday, 13 May (1:30 pm)	Aspley 8.18 (66)	def. by	Mount Gravatt 11.12 (78)	Graham Road

=== Round 9 ===
	Eastern Conference
Saturday, 19 May (1:00 pm)	Sydney 22.12 (144)	def.	Eastlake 5.13 (43)	Sydney Cricket Ground
Saturday, 19 May (2:00 pm)	Tuggeranong 10.7 (67)	def. by	Ainslie 22.17 (149)	Greenway Oval
Saturday, 19 May (2:00 pm)	Belconnen 7.4 (46)	def. by	Queanbeyan 18.16 (124)	Manuka Oval
Sunday, 20 May (2:10 pm)	Sydney Hills 24.19 (163)	def.	Sydney University 8.10 (58)	Bruce Purser Reserve

	Northern Conference
Saturday, 19 May (1:30 pm)	Broadbeach 25.12 (162)	def.	Aspley 12.7 (79)	H & A Oval
Saturday, 19 May (1:30 pm)	Labrador 20.16 (136)	def.	Morningside 15.13 (103)	Cooke-Murphy Oval
Saturday, 19 May (1:30 pm)	Mount Gravatt 11.12 (78)	def. by	Southport 18.12 (120)	Dittmer Park
Saturday, 19 May (1:30 pm)	Redland 14.14 (98)	def. by	Gold Coast 24.15 (159)	Tidbold Park
Sunday, 20 May (9:30 am)	Brisbane 41.28 (274)	def.	UWS Giants 5.3 (33)	Leyshon Park
	Bye; NT Thunder

=== Round 10 ===
	Eastern Conference
Saturday, 2 June (2:00 pm)	Sydney Hills 20.16 (136)	def.	UWS Giants 4.3 (27)	Bruce Purser Reserve
Saturday, 2 June (2:00 pm)	Belconnen 21.8 (134)	def.	Sydney University 6.7 (43)	Manuka Oval
Sunday, 3 June (11:00 am)	Sydney 16.13 (109)	def.	Gold Coast 8.8 (56)	Blacktown International Sportspark
Sunday, 3 June (2:00 pm)	Queanbeyan 16.10 (106)	def.	Ainslie 13.11 (89)	Dairy Farmers Park
Sunday, 3 June (2:00 pm)	Eastlake 8.12 (60)	def.	Tuggeranong 2.8 (20)	Manuka Oval

	Northern Conference
Saturday, 2 June (1:30 pm)	Southport 12.8 (80)	def.	Labrador 5.9 (39)	Fankhauser Reserve
Saturday, 2 June (1:30 pm)	Aspley 9.9 (36)	def. by	Redland 11.8 (74)	Graham Road
Saturday, 2 June (1:30 pm)	Broadbeach 5.12 (42)	def. by	Brisbane 24.15 (159)	Graham Road
Saturday, 2 June (6:00 pm)	NT Thunder 22.11 (143)	def.	Mount Gravatt 4.6 (30)	TIO Stadium
	Bye; Morningside

=== Round 11 ===
	Eastern Conference
Saturday, 9 June (11:45 am)	Eastlake 23.8 (146)	def.	Aspley 16.12 (108)	Manuka Oval
Saturday, 9 June (2:00 pm)	Queanbeyan 14.12 (96)	def. by	Sydney 20.17 (137)	Dairy Farmers Park
Saturday, 9 June (2:00 pm)	Sydney University 26.14 (170)	def.	Tuggeranong 13.9 (87)	Sydney University Oval
Sunday, 10 June (2:00 pm)	Belconnen 8.14 (62)	def. by	Sydney Hills 12.16 (88)	Manuka Oval
	Bye; Ainslie, UWS Giants

	Northern Conference
Saturday, 9 June (12:30 pm)	Gold Coast 18.9 (117)	def.	Broadbeach 6.15 (51)	Metricon Stadium
Saturday, 9 June (1:30 pm)	Southport 10.15 (75)	def. by	Redland 10.16 (76)	Fankhauser Reserve
Saturday, 9 June (1:30 pm)	Labrador 11.9 (75)	def. by	NT Thunder 16.13 (109)	Cooke-Murphy Oval
Saturday, 9 June (1:30 pm)	Mount Gravatt 17.11 (113)	def.	Morningside 15.12 (103)	Dittmer Park
	Bye; Brisbane

=== Round 12 ===
	Eastern Conference
Saturday, 16 June (10:30 am)	UWS Giants 13.15 (93)	def. by	NT Thunder 22.7 (139)	Škoda Stadium
Saturday, 16 June (11:45 am)	Queanbeyan 8.12 (60)	def. by	Southport 17.13 (115)	Dairy Farmers Park
Sunday, 17 June (2:00 pm)	Ainslie 28.17 (185)	def.	Tuggeranong 9.8 (62)	Ainslie Oval
	Bye; Eastlake, Sydney Hills, Sydney, Sydney University

	Northern Conference
Saturday, 16 June (10:45 am)	Gold Coast 7.8 (50)	def. by	Brisbane 10.12 (72)	H & A Oval
Saturday, 16 June (1:00 pm)	Redland 14.12 (96)	def.	Belconnen 13.12 (90)	Tidbold Park
Saturday, 16 June (2:00 pm)	Broadbeach 20.6 (126)	def.	Labrador 15.9 (99)	H & A Oval
Sunday, 17 June (1:30 pm)	Morningside 17.11 (113)	def. by	Aspley 18.9 (117)	Jack Esplen Oval
	Bye; Mount Gravatt

=== Round 13 ===
	Eastern Conference
Friday, 22 June (4:10 pm)	Sydney 28.20 (188)	def.	Sydney University 6.4 (40)	Sydney Cricket Ground
Saturday, 23 June (2:00 pm)	Ainslie 10.7 (67)	def. by	Queanbeyan 17.12 (114)	Ainslie Oval
Saturday, 23 June (2:00 pm)	Tuggeranong 18.10 (118)	def.	UWS Giants 13.11 (89)	Greenway Oval
Saturday, 23 June (2:30 pm)	Sydney Hills 9.11 (65)	def.	Eastlake 14.13 (97)	Blacktown International Sportspark
	Bye; Belconnen

	Northern Conference
Saturday, 23 June (1:30 pm)	Southport 13.5 (83)	def. by	Brisbane 24.18 (162)	Fankhauser Reserve
Saturday, 23 June (1:30 pm)	Mount Gravatt 16.11 (107)	def. by	Labrador 18.8 (116)	Dittmer Park
Sunday, 24 June (1:30 pm)	Redland 25.13 (163)	def.	Morningside 11.6 (72)	Tidbold Park
	Bye; Aspley, Broadbeach, Gold Coast, NT Thunder

=== Round 14 ===
	Eastern Conference
Saturday, 30 June (2:00 pm)	Sydney Hills 10.13 (73)	def.	Ainslie 20.11 (131)	Bruce Purser Reserve
Saturday, 30 June (2:00 pm)	Eastlake 19.27 (141)	def.	Sydney University 4.1 (25)	Manuka Oval
Saturday, 30 June (4:00 pm)	Sydney 18.21 (129)	def.	UWS Giants 6.6 (42)	ANZ Stadium
Sunday, 1 July (2:00 pm)	Queanbeyan 12.11 (83)	def.	Belconnen 9.8 (62)	Dairy Farmers Park

	Northern Conference
Saturday, 30 June (1:00 pm)	Morningside 22.15 (147)	def.	Tuggeranong 15.12 (102)	Jack Esplen Oval
Saturday, 30 June (1:30 pm)	Aspley 12.12 (84)	def. by	Broadbeach 12.16 (88)	Graham Road
Saturday, 30 June (6:00 pm)	NT Thunder 16.17 (113)	def.	Gold Coast 11.8 (74)	TIO Stadium
Sunday, 30 June (11:00 am)	Brisbane 34.14 (218)	def.	Mount Gravatt 7.3 (45)	Sherwood Oval
	Bye; Labrador, Redland, Southport

=== Round 15 ===
	Eastern Conference
Saturday, 7 July (12:00 pm)	Sydney University 8.12 (60)	def. by	Broadbeach 20.12 (132)	Sydney University Oval
Saturday, 7 July (1:00 pm)	Sydney 16.7 (103)	def. by	Brisbane 17.20 (122)	Sydney Cricket Ground
Sunday, 8 July (11:00 am)	Eastlake 14.8 (92)	def.	Belconnen 12.11 (83)	Manuka Oval
Sunday, 8 July (12:00 pm)	Sydney Hills 16.15 (111)	def.	Tuggeranong 13.17 (95)	Bruce Purser Reserve
	Bye; Ainslie, Queanbeyan

	Northern Conference
Saturday, 7 July (1:30 pm)	Labrador 9.9 (63)	def. by	Southport 19.16 (130)	Cooke-Murphy Oval
Saturday, 7 July (1:30 pm)	Redland 17.16 (118)	def.	Mount Gravatt 14.10 (94)	Tidbold Park
Saturday, 7 July (6:00 pm)	NT Thunder 21.16 (142)	def.	Aspley 15.10 (100)	TIO Stadium
Sunday, 8 July (11:00 am)	Gold Coast 16.7 (103)	def.	UWS Giants 11.6 (72)	Metricon Stadium
	Bye; Morningside

=== Round 16 ===
	Eastern Conference
Saturday, 14 July (2:00 pm)	Tuggeranong 8.13 (61)	def. by	Queanbeyan 20.10 (130)	Greenway Oval
Saturday, 14 July (2:00 pm)	Belconnen 16.12 (108)	def.	Ainslie 9.7 (61)	Manuka Oval
Sunday, 15 July (9:30 am)	Sydney University 11.13 (79)	def. by	UWS Giants 18.18 (126)	Škoda Stadium
	Bye; Eastlake, Sydney Hills, Sydney

	Northern Conference
Saturday, 14 July (1:30 pm)	Southport 23.16 (154)	def.	Morningside 5.11 (41)	Fankhauser Reserve
Saturday, 14 July (1:30 pm)	Aspley 12.7 (79)	def. by	Gold Coast 18.7 (115)	Graham Road
Saturday, 14 July (1:30 pm)	Brisbane 17.15 (117)	def.	Labrador 2.8 (20)	Leyshon Park
Saturday, 14 July (1:30 pm)	Redland 15.13 (103)	def.	Broadbeach 14.6 (90)	Tidbold Park
	Bye; Mount Gravatt, NT Thunder

=== Round 17 ===
	Eastern Conference
Saturday, 21 July (12:00 pm)	UWS Giants 15.8 (92)	def. by	Ainslie 17.9 (111)	Robertson Oval
Saturday, 21 July (2:00 pm)	Eastlake 8.11 (59)	def. by	Queanbeyan 14.8 (102)	Manuka Oval
Saturday, 21 July (2:10 pm)	Sydney University 12.11 (83)	def.	Sydney Hills 8.14 (62)	Sydney University Oval
Sunday, 22 July (9:30 am)	Sydney 31.11 (197)	def.	Belconnen 10.6 (66)	Sydney Cricket Ground
	Bye; Tuggeranong

	Northern Conference
Saturday, 21 July (12:30 pm)	Gold Coast 15.13 (103)	def.	Brisbane 14.11 (95)	Metricon Stadium
Saturday, 21 July (1:30 pm)	Morningside 14.12 (96)	def. by	Mount Gravatt 20.12 (132)	Jack Esplen Oval
Saturday, 21 July (3:20 pm)	NT Thunder 11.20 (86)	def.	Labrador 7.7 (49)	Traeger Park
Sunday, 22 July (1:30 pm)	Southport 19.12 (126)	def.	Aspley 11.18 (84)	Fankhauser Reserve
	Bye; Broadbeach, Redland

=== Round 18 ===
	Eastern Conference
Saturday, 28 July (2:00 pm)	Ainslie 26.11 (167)	def.	Tuggeranong 8.11 (59)	Ainslie Oval
Sunday, 29 July (2:00 pm)	Belconnen 12.11 (83)	def.	Eastlake 10.13 (73)	Manuka Oval
	Bye; Sydney University

	Northern Conference
Saturday, 28 July (1:00 pm)	Broadbeach 10.11 (71)	def. by	Queanbeyan 13.14 (92)	H & A Oval
Saturday, 28 July (1:00 pm)	Labrador 9.13 (67)	def. by	Sydney Hills 15.12 (102)	Cooke-Murphy Oval
Saturday, 28 July (1:30 pm)	Mount Gravatt 13.6 (84)	def. by	Brisbane 19.13 (127)	Dittmer Park
Saturday, 28 July (3:00 pm)	Gold Coast 15.10 (100)	def. by	Sydney 20.11 (131)	Metricon Stadium
Saturday, 28 July (6:00 pm)	NT Thunder 23.16 (154)	def.	UWS Giants 10.12 (72)	TIO Stadium
Sunday, 29 July (1:30 pm)	Morningside 12.7 (79)	def. by	Redland 15.16 (106)	Jack Esplen Oval
	Bye; Aspley, Southport

=== Round 19 ===
	Eastern Conference
Saturday, 4 August (10:30 am)	UWS Giants 9.10 (64)	def. by	Sydney 18.18 (126)	Škoda Stadium
Saturday, 4 August (12:00 pm)	Sydney Hills 17.11 (113)	def.	Mount Gravatt 8.13 (61)	Bruce Purser Reserve
Saturday, 4 August (2:00 pm)	Belconnen 15.13 (103)	def.	Tuggeranong 14.7 (91)	Manuka Oval
Saturday, 4 August (2:10 pm)	Sydney University 14.6 (90)	def. by	Queanbeyan 26.13 (169)	Henson Park
Sunday, 5 August (2:00 pm)	Eastlake 13.3 (81)	def. by	Ainslie 14.8 (91)	Manuka Oval

	Northern Conference
Saturday, 4 August (1:30 pm)	Broadbeach 15.10 (100)	def. by	Morningside 21.7 (133)	H & A Oval
Saturday, 4 August (1:30 pm)	Labrador 17.10 (112)	def.	Aspley 17.9 (111)	Cooke-Murphy Oval
Saturday, 4 August (6:00 pm)	NT Thunder 12.20 (92)	def.	Southport 7.8 (50)	TIO Stadium
Sunday, 5 August (1:30 pm)	Brisbane 26.11 (167)	def.	Redland 10.15 (75)	Giffin Park
	Bye; Gold Coast

=== Round 20 ===
	Eastern Conference
Saturday, 11 August (2:00 pm)	Queanbeyan 13.11 (89)	def.	Eastlake 8.12 (60)	Dairy Farmers Park
Saturday, 11 August (4:00 pm)	Sydney Hills 9.5 (59)	def. by	Sydney 27.18 (180)	ANZ Stadium
	Bye; Belconnen, Tuggeranong

	Northern Conference
Saturday, 11 August (11:30 am)	Labrador 11.8 (74)	def. by	Redland 17.13 (115)	Cooke-Murphy Oval
Saturday, 11 August (12:30 pm)	Gold Coast 15.6 (96)	def. by	UWS Giants 15.12 (102)	Metricon Stadium
Saturday, 11 August (1:00 pm)	Southport 23.15 (153)	def.	Sydney University 9.8 (62)	Fankhauser Reserve
Saturday, 11 August (1:00 pm)	Aspley 11.19 (85)	def. by	Ainslie 13.14 (92)	Graham Road
Saturday, 11 August (1:30 pm)	Morningside 12.6 (78)	def. by	NT Thunder 17.17 (119)	Jack Esplen Oval
Sunday, 12 August (1:30 pm)	Mount Gravatt 10.9 (69)	def. by	Broadbeach 16.18 (114)	Dittmer Park
	Bye; Brisbane

=== Round 21 ===
	Eastern Conference
Saturday, 18 August (10:00 am)	Belconnen 16.18 (104)	def.	UWS Giants 8.6 (54)	Manuka Oval
Saturday, 18 August (11:45 am)	Ainslie 19.10 (124)	def.	Sydney University 8.8 (54)	Ainslie Oval
Sunday, 19 August (11:45 am)	Eastlake 18.14 (122)	def.	Sydney Hills 13.9 (87)	Manuka Oval
Sunday, 19 August (2:00 pm)	Tuggeranong 8.8 (56)	def. by	Queanbeyan 19.14 (128)	Greenway Oval

	Northern Conference
Saturday, 18 August (1:30 pm)	Aspley 24.16 (160)	def.	Morningside 15.13 (103)	Graham Road
Saturday, 18 August (1:30 pm)	Broadbeach 14.11 (95)	def. by	Southport 16.15 (111)	H & A Oval
Saturday, 18 August (1:30 pm)	Brisbane 13.8 (96)	def. by	Sydney 17.15 (117)	Leyshon Park
Saturday, 18 August (1:30 pm)	Mount Gravatt 13.16 (94)	def.	Gold Coast 12.10 (82)	Dittmer Park
Saturday, 18 August (6:00 pm)	NT Thunder 19.9 (123)	def.	Redland 5.15 (45)	TIO Stadium
	Bye; Labrador

== Ladder ==
2012 NEAFL Eastern Conference Ladder
Pos	Team	Pld	W	L	D	PF	PA	PP	Pts
1	Queanbeyan (C)	18	15	3	0	2121	1385	153.1	60
2	Sydney	18	14	4	0	2520	1285	196.1	56
3	Ainslie	18	12	6	0	1966	1652	119.0	48
4	Eastlake	18	11	7	0	1733	1479	117.2	44
5	Sydney Hills	18	10	8	0	1829	1784	102.5	40
6	Belconnen	18	6	11	1	1603	1789	89.6	26
7	UWS Giants	18	5	13	0	1390	2195	63.3	20
8	Sydney University	18	3	15	0	1313	2411	54.5	12
9	Tuggeranong	18	1	16	1	1365	2432	56.1	6

Source: www.neafl.com.au
Rules for classification: 1) points; 2) percentage; 3) number of points for.
(C) Conference Premiers

2012 NEAFL Northern Conference Ladder
Pos	Team	Pld	W	L	D	PF	PA	PP	Pts
1	NT Thunder	18	15	3	0	2067	1391	148.6	60
2	Brisbane (C, P)	18	14	4	0	2335	1329	175.7	56
3	Southport	18	14	4	0	1978	1329	148.8	56
4	Redland	18	11	6	1	1888	1898	99.5	46
5	Gold Coast	18	9	9	0	1687	1525	110.6	36
6	Labrador	18	9	9	0	1637	1747	93.7	36
7	Broadbeach	18	8	9	1	1776	1823	97.4	34
8	Mount Gravatt	18	5	13	0	1477	2157	68.5	20
9	Aspley	18	4	14	0	1711	2028	84.4	16
10	Morningside	18	3	15	0	1578	2288	69.0	12

Source: www.neafl.com.au
Rules for classification: 1) points; 2) percentage; 3) number of points for.
(C) Conference Premiers; (P) Premiers

== Finals series ==
=== Week 1 ===
	Eastern Conference Qualifying Final
Saturday, 25 August (11:45 am)	Sydney 24.17 (161)	def.	Ainslie 13.4 (82)	Blacktown Olympic Park

	Northern Conference Qualifying Final
Saturday, 25 August (1:30 pm)	Brisbane 14.18 (102)	def.	Southport 9.13 (63)	Coorparoo Oval

	Eastern Conference Elimination Final
Sunday, 26 August (2:00 pm)	Eastlake 9.15 (69)	def.	Sydney Hills 7.12 (54)	Manuka Oval

	Northern Conference Elimination Final
Sunday, 26 August (1:30 pm)	Redland 22.14 (146)	def.	Gold Coast 6.11 (47)	Tidbold Park

=== Week 2 ===
	Eastern Conference Semi-finals
Saturday, 1 September (2:00 pm)	Queanbeyan 13.5 (83)	def. by	Sydney 21.12 (138)	Manuka Oval
Sunday, 2 September (2:00 pm)	Ainslie 11.8 (74)	def. by	Eastlake 10.15 (75)	Manuka Oval

	Northern Conference Semi-finals
Saturday, 1 September (6:00 pm)	NT Thunder 11.12 (78)	def. by	Brisbane 17.10 (112)	Northline Oval
Sunday, 2 September (1:30 pm)	Southport 10.9 (69)	def.	Redland 9.12 (66)	Fankhauser Reserve

=== Week 3 ===
	Eastern Conference Preliminary Final
Saturday, 8 September (2:00 pm)	Queanbeyan 14.13 (97)	def.	Eastlake 10.9 (69)	Manuka Oval

	Northern Conference Preliminary Final
Saturday, 8 September (1:30 pm)	NT Thunder 18.12 (120)	def.	Southport 12.11 (83)	H & A Oval

=== Week 4 ===
	Eastern Conference Grand Final
Sunday, 16 September (2:15 pm)	Sydney 13.13 (91)	def. by	Queanbeyan 18.13 (121)	Manuka Oval (crowd: 3,700)

	Northern Conference Grand Final
Sunday, 16 September (2:00 pm)	Brisbane 21.8 (134)	def.	NT Thunder 10.14 (74)	Yeronga

=== Week 5 ===
	NEAFL Grand Final
Saturday, 22 September (11:30 am)	Queanbeyan 11.9 (75)	def. by	Brisbane 22.12 (144)	Manuka Oval (crowd: 500)

== Foxtel Cup ==
=== Round of 16 ===
Game #1 (AFL Rd 1) 31 March 2012; 10:05 EST	Morningside	82 – 49 curtain raiser to Gold Coast v Adelaide	Launceston	Metricon Stadium, Gold Coast match report
	4.3 (27); 6.4 (40); 10.6 (66); 12.10 (82)	match report	3.2 (20); 5.4 (34); 6.4 (40); 7.7 (49)
		Goals
	Abey 3, Mugavin 3, Brown 2, Amos, Bonney, Delbridge, Mollison		Finch 3, Bristow, Ellis, Lee, O’Keefe
		Bests
	Bonney, Mugavin, Brown, Hackett, Elliott, Abey		Bristow, O’Keefe, Finch, Wooley, Stephens

Game #4 (AFL Rd 4) 21 April 2012; 11:05 EST	Ainslie	48 - 90 stand alone game (note)	West Perth	Blacktown International Sportspark Sydney, Blacktown match report
	1.0 (6); 2.1 (13); 4.3 (27); 7.6 (48)	match report	4.3 (27); 8.6 (54); 11.8 (74); 13.12 (90)
		Goals
	N.Paine 2, J.Whatman 2, L.Carter, S.Horner, M.Lawless		D.Barden 3, M.Johnson 2, A.Strijk 2, J.Van Berlo 2, M.Mascoulis, S.Nelson, A.Saylor, K.Shannon
		Bests
	Paine, Whatman, Crook, Bennett, Walker		Van Berlo, LeCras, Barden, Bartholomew, Nelson, Strijk

Game #6 (AFL Rd 6) 5 May 2012; 11:05 EST	Sydney Hills	54 - 80 curtain raiser to Sydney Swans v Adelaide	Mount Gravatt	Sydney Cricket Ground match report
	1.0 (6); 3.4 (22); 5.9 (39); 7.12 (54)	match report	4.4 (28); 6.8 (44); 9.11 (65); 11.14 (80)
		Goals
	Tungatalum 4, Doyle, Garlick, Houlihan		Gilliand 3, Estall 2, Mowat 2, Furfaro, Jamieson, Smith, Scott
		Bests
	Tungatalum, Houlihan, Costello, Turner		Gilliand, Lake, Bernasconi, Vearing, Grose, Smith, Estall

Game #8 (AFL Rd 8) 19 May 2012; 10:35 CST	Northern Territory Thunder	49 - 137 curtain raiser to Western Bulldogs v Gold Coast	Port Melbourne	TIO Stadium, Darwin match report
	3.2 (20); 3.6 (24); 4.7 (31); 7.7 (49)	match report	3.2 (20); 8.4 (52); 16.8 (104); 21.11 (137)
		Goals
	Anderson 2, Campbell, Cunningham, Lawler, McLean, Stokes		O’Sullivan 7, Williams 3, Hinkley 2, Woffindin 2, Breust, Dillon, Gale, Johnston, Langford, Muling, Scipione
		Bests
	Anderson, Dignan, Tyrell, McLean, Dunne		O’Sullivan, Woofindin, Brewer, Pitt, Williams, Hinkley, Dermott

=== Quarter-finals ===
Qualifying Final #1 (AFL Rd 10) 2 June 2012; 11:05 CST	Port Adelaide	60 - 76 curtain-raiser to Port Adelaide v Carlton	Morningside	AAMI Stadium, Adelaide match report
	3.0 (18); 4.3 (27); 7.5 (47); 9.6 (60)	match report	4.2 (26); 6.2 (38); 7.3 (45); 12.4 (76)
		Goals
	Rose 3, Wilson 2, Young 2, Ah Chee, McKenzie		Abey 5, Mugavin 3, Elliott 2, McNiece, Upton
		Bests
	Rose, Salopek, Ah Chee, Young, McKenzie		Abey, Upton, Shelton, Bonney, Mugavin, Brown

=== Semi-finals ===
Semi-final #1 (AFL Rd 15) 7 July 2012; 11:35 EST	Morningside	40 - 111 stand alone game	Werribee	Gabba, Brisbane match report
	1.1 (7); 4.1 (25); 6.3 (39); 6.4 (40)	match report	3.5 (23); 5.9 (39); 10.12 (72); 16.15 (111)
		Goals
	Spackman 3, Faure, Shelton, Starcevich		McKinley 5, Daw 3, Pedersen 2, Speight 2, Bolton, Greenwood, Lynch, Moloney
		Bests
	Spackman, Spaure, Shelton, Starcevich, McNiece, Bonney		Pedersen, McKinley, Daw, Speight, Warren, Sharp, Keras

== Awards ==
- The Grogan Medal was shared between Ryan Davey of Labrador, Fraser Pope of Southport and Tom Salter of Redland. All three polled 14 votes to be judged as the best and fairest players in the Northern Conference of the NEAFL.
- The Mulrooney Medal was won by Shane Harris of the Belconnen. He polled 16 votes to be judged as the best and fairest player in the Eastern Conference of the NEAFL.

=== Best and fairest ===
Club	Award name	Player
Ainslie	Hibberson Cup Perpetual Trophy	
Aspley	Carl Herbert Medal	Matt Payne
Belconnen		Shane Harris
Brisbane		
Broadbeach	Syd Guildford Trophy	
Eastlake		Justin Mesman
Gold Coast		
Labrador	Danny Newman Medal	
Morningside	Devery-Kelly Medal	
Mount Gravatt	Jim Fletcher Medal	
NT Thunder		Jason Roe
Queanbeyan	Tony Wynd Medal	
Redland	Dowling Medal	Scott Clouston
Southport		
Sydney Hills		Jamie Vlarko
Sydney		
Sydney University		
Tuggeranong		Marc Dragicevic
UWS Giants		

== Team of the year ==
=== Eastern conference ===
2012 Eastern Conference Team of the Year
B:	Dale Walker (Ainslie)	Roy Jaques (Queanbeyan)	Kade Klemke (Queanbeyan)
HB:	Aaron Bruce (Eastlake)	Josh Bruce (UWS Giants)	Marcus Crook (Ainslie)
C:	Toby Conroy (Queanbeyan)	Jarred Moore (Sydney)	Josh Moody (Eastlake)
HF:	Kaine Stevens (Queanbeyan)	Jamie Vlatko (Sydney Hills)	Nicholas Paine (Ainslie)
F:	Mitch Morton (Sydney University)	James Kavanagh (Sydney)	Shane Harris (Belconnen)
Foll:	Jesse White (UWS Giants)	William Griggs (Queanbeyan)	Tom Ayton (Eastlake)
Int:	Alexander Lee (Sydney University)	Marc Dragicevic (Tuggeranong)	Ryan Brabazon (Eastlake)
Int:	Ryan Houlihan (Sydney Hills)	Simon Horner (Ainslie)	Matthew Porter (Belconnen)
Coach:	N/A		

=== Northern conference ===
2012 Northern Conference Team of the Year
B:	Danny Wise (Southport)	Jason Roe (NT Thunder)	Steve Wrigley (Brisbane)
HB:	Todd Grayson (Labrador)	Wayde Mills (Southport)	Adam Oxley (Redland)
C:	James Hawksley (Brisbane)	Jake Dignan (NT Thunder)	Cheynee Stiller (Brisbane)
HF:	Matthew Payne (Aspley)	Scott Clouston (Redland)	Josh Baxter (Southport)
F:	Gavin Grose (Mount Gravatt)	Darren Ewing (NT Thunder)	Sam Faure (Morningside)
Foll:	Dylan Reid (Aspley)	Andrew McQualter (Gold Coast)	Jason Burge(Southport)
Int:	Ryan Davey (Labrador)	Brad Rees (Redland)	Phil Carse (Redland)
Int:	Matt Rosier (NT Thunder)	Ryan Pantic (Broadbeach)	
Coach:	N/A		

== AFL draftees ==
Draft pick	Player	Club	Drafted to
58_{N}	Clay Cameron	Mount Gravatt	Gold Coast
35_{R}	Adam Oxley	Redland	Collingwood
46_{R}	Craig Moller	Sydney University	Fremantle
51_{R}	Joseph Redfern	Sydney Hills	Greater Western Sydney
55_{R}	Andrew Boston	Broadbeach	Gold Coast
63_{R}	Jordon Bourke	Morningside	Brisbane Lions

N – national draft
R – rookie draft
