= 2013 NEAFL season =

- Teams: 19
- Premiers: Brisbane; 2nd premiership
- Minor premiers: Brisbane; 1st minor premiership
- Grogan Medallist: Haydn Kiel; Southport (21 votes)
- Mulrooney Medallist: James Bennett; Belconnen
- Leading goalkicker: Darren Ewing; NT Thunder (95 goals)
- Matches played: 184

The 2013 NEAFL season was the third season of the North East Australian Football League (NEAFL) in Australia. The Brisbane Lions reserves were the premiers for the season after they defeated the Sydney Swans reserves by 8 points in the Grand Final.

== League structure ==
The league is split into two divisions called the Northern Conference and the Eastern Conference. The two teams who win their respective Conference finals series meet in the Grand Final.

== Participating clubs ==
Eastern Conference Participating Clubs
Club	Location	Home ground
Ainslie	Canberra, ACT	Ainslie Oval
Belconnen	Canberra, ACT	Kippax Oval
Eastlake	Canberra, ACT	StarTrack Oval
Queanbeyan	Canberra, ACT	Dairy Farmers Park
Sydney Hills	Sydney, NSW	Bruce Purser Reserve
Sydney	Sydney, NSW	Sydney Cricket Ground
Sydney University	Sydney, NSW	Sydney University Oval
Tuggeranong	Canberra, ACT	Greenway Oval
UWS Giants	Sydney, NSW	Blacktown Olympic Park

Northern Conference Participating Clubs
Club	Location	Home ground
Aspley	Brisbane, QLD	Graham Road
Brisbane	Brisbane, QLD	Gabba
Broadbeach	Gold Coast, QLD	H & A Oval
Gold Coast	Gold Coast, QLD	Metricon Stadium
Labrador	Gold Coast, QLD	Cooke-Murphy Oval
Morningside	Brisbane, QLD	Jack Esplen Oval
Mount Gravatt	Brisbane, QLD	Dittmar Park
NT Thunder	Darwin, NT	TIO Stadium
Redland	Brisbane, QLD	Tidbold Park
Southport	Gold Coast, QLD	Fankhauser Reserve

== Regular season ==
=== Round 1 ===
	Eastern Conference
Saturday, 23 March (2:00 pm)	Belconnen 9.13 (67)	def. by	Eastlake 18.5 (113)	Kippax Oval
Sunday, 24 March (2:00 pm)	Queanbeyan 12.9 (81)	def.	Ainslie 11.12 (78)	Dairy Farmers Park
	Bye; Sydney Hills, Sydney, Sydney University, Tuggeranong, UWS Giants

	Northern Conference
Saturday, 23 March (1:30 pm)	Southport 19.9 (111)	def.	Aspley 16.10 (106)	Fankhauser Reserve
Saturday, 23 March (1:30 pm)	Morningside 13.15 (93)	def.	Labrador 10.9 (69)	Jack Esplen Oval
Saturday, 23 March (7:00 pm)	NT Thunder 15.12 (102)	def. by	Broadbeach 16.8 (104)	TIO Stadium
Sunday, 24 March (1:30 pm)	Mount Gravatt 12.16 (88)	def. by	Redland 14.27 (111)	Dittmer Park
	Bye; Brisbane, Gold Coast

=== Round 2 ===
	Eastern Conference
Thursday, 28 March (6:00 pm)	Tuggeranong 11.14 (80)	def.	Eastlake 6.11 (47)	Greenway Oval
Saturday, 30 March (12:30 pm)	Ainslie 19.18 (132)	def.	Sydney Hills 11.8 (74)	Ainslie Oval
Saturday, 30 March (12:30 pm)	Belconnen 24.8 (152)	def.	Sydney University 14.15 (117)	Kippax Oval
Saturday, 30 March (1:00 pm)	UWS Giants 14.18 (102)	def. by	Sydney 17.5 (107)	ANZ Stadium

	Northern Conference
Saturday, 30 March (1:00 pm)	Labrador 12.9 (81)	def. by	Queanbeyan 15.8 (98)	Cooke-Murphy Oval
Saturday, 30 March (1:30 pm)	Aspley 20.8 (128)	def.	NT Thunder 14.6 (90)	Graham Road
Saturday, 30 March (1:30 pm)	Morningside 8.9 (57)	def. by	Brisbane 22.12 (144)	Jack Esplen Oval
Saturday, 30 March (3:00 pm)	Gold Coast 24.14 (158)	def.	Mount Gravatt 4.8 (32)	Metricon Stadium
Sunday, 31 March (1:30 pm)	Southport 16.12 (108)	def.	Redland 5.10 (40)	Fankhauser Reserve
	Bye; Broadbeach

=== Round 3 ===
	Eastern Conference
Saturday, 6 April (10:05 am)	Sydney 15.20 (110)	def.	Gold Coast 10.5 (65)	Sydney Cricket Ground
Saturday, 6 April (11:45 am)	Ainslie 12.7 (79)	def. by	Morningside 17.12 (114)	Ainslie Oval
Saturday, 6 April (2:00 pm)	Belconnen 17.16 (118)	def.	Tuggeranong 9.9 (63)	Kippax Oval
Saturday, 6 April (7:00 pm)	Sydney Hills 20.9 (129)	def.	Sydney University 13.15 (93)	Bruce Purser Reserve
Sunday, 7 April (2:00 pm)	Queanbeyan 23.18 (156)	def.	Eastlake 9.9 (63)	Dairy Farmers Park

	Northern Conference
Saturday, 6 April (11:00 am)	Brisbane 14.17 (101)	def.	UWS Giants 8.14 (62)	Giffin Park
Saturday, 6 April (7:00 pm)	NT Thunder 24.16 (160)	def.	Mount Gravatt 9.11 (65)	TIO Stadium
Sunday, 7 April (1:30 pm)	Broadbeach 7.6 (48)	def. by	Southport 17.15 (117)	H & A Oval
	Bye; Aspley, Labrador, Redland

=== Round 4 ===
	Eastern Conference
Saturday, 13 April (11:15 am)	UWS Giants 22.9 (141)	def.	Ainslie 9.10 (64)	Macpherson Oval
Saturday, 13 April (12:00 pm)	Sydney Hills 14.15 (99)	def. by	Southport 17.13 (115)	Bruce Purser Reserve
Saturday, 13 April (2:00 pm)	Sydney University 11.13 (79)	def. by	Eastlake 18.8 (116)	Drummoyne Oval
Sunday, 14 April (11:45 am)	Tuggeranong 6.4 (40)	def. by	Sydney 36.21 (237)	Greenway Oval
	Bye; Belconnen, Queanbeyan

	Northern Conference
Saturday, 13 April (1:30 pm)	Aspley 11.13 (79)	def.	Broadbeach 12.5 (77)	Graham Road
Saturday, 13 April (1:30 pm)	Mount Gravatt 8.10 (58)	def. by	Labrador 13.10 (88)	Cooke-Murphy Oval
Sunday, 14 April (12:00 pm)	Gold Coast 10.10 (70)	def. by	Brisbane 28.12 (180)	Metricon Stadium
Sunday, 14 April (1:30 pm)	Redland 7.23 (65)	def. by	Morningside 17.9 (111)	Tidbold Park
	Bye; NT Thunder

=== Round 5 ===
	Eastern Conference
Friday, 19 April (4:10 pm)	Sydney 22.16 (148)	def.	Sydney Hills 13.8 (86)	Sydney Cricket Ground
Saturday, 20 April (11:45 am)	Queanbeyan 15.9 (99)	def.	Aspley 14.12 (96)	Dairy Farmers Park
Sunday, 21 April (11:45 am)	Belconnen 19.13 (137)	def. by	UWS Giants 20.17 (137)	Kippax Oval
	Bye; Ainslie, Eastlake, Tuggeranong

	Northern Conference
Saturday, 20 April (1:00 pm)	Morningside 19.11 (125)	def.	Sydney University 8.9 (57)	Jack Esplen Oval
Saturday, 20 April (1:30 pm)	Brisbane 20.16 (136)	def.	Broadbeach 7.14 (56)	Giffin Park
Saturday, 20 April (1:30 pm)	Redland 12.13 (85)	def. by	Gold Coast 22.19 (151)	Tidbold Park
Saturday, 20 April (3:30 pm)	NT Thunder 29.7 (181)	def.	Labrador 15.8 (98)	Traeger Park
	Bye; Mount Gravatt, Southport

=== Round 6 ===
	Eastern Conference
Saturday, 27 April (9:30 am)	UWS Giants 24.15 (158)	def.	Eastlake 9.13 (67)	StarTrack Oval
Sunday, 28 April (2:00 pm)	Queanbeyan 20.18 (138)	def.	Tuggeranong 10.6 (66)	Dairy Farmers Park
Sunday, 28 April (2:00 pm)	Sydney University 14.10 (94)	def. by	Sydney Hills 17.10 (112)	Henson Park
	Bye; Sydney

	Northern Conference
Thursday, 25 April (2:10 pm)	Gold Coast 12.9 (79)	def. by	Brisbane 17.9 (111)	Harrup Park
Saturday, 27 April (1:00 pm)	Broadbeach 12.8 (80)	def. by	Ainslie 20.11 (131)	H & A Oval
Saturday, 27 April (1:00 pm)	Mount Gravatt 6.12 (48)	def. by	Belconnen 24.20 (164)	Leyshon Park
Saturday, 27 April (1:30 pm)	Aspley 17.8 (110)	def.	Morningside 13.11 (89)	Graham Road
Saturday, 27 April (1:30 pm)	Redland 11.15 (81)	def. by	NT Thunder 13.14 (92)	Tidbold Park
Saturday, 27 April (7:30 pm)	Southport 15.11 (101)	def.	Labrador 4.13 (37)	Fankhauser Reserve

=== Round 7 ===
	Eastern Conference
Saturday, 4 May (11:45 am)	Tuggeranong 10.7 (67)	def.	Mount Gravatt 9.9 (63)	Greenway Oval
Saturday, 4 May (2:00 pm)	Belconnen 19.22 (136)	def.	Queanbeyan 11.7 (73)	Kippax Oval
Saturday, 4 May (2:00 pm)	Eastlake 14.9 (93)	def. by	Ainslie 15.10 (100)	StarTrack Oval
Sunday, 5 May (9:30 am)	Sydney 11.15 (81)	def. by	Brisbane 15.14 (104)	Sydney Cricket Ground
	Bye; Sydney Hills, Sydney University, UWS Giants

	Northern Conference
Saturday, 4 May (1:30 pm)	Aspley 14.8 (92)	def. by	Redland 14.14 (98)	Graham Road
Saturday, 4 May (4:00 pm)	Gold Coast 16.10 (106)	def.	Southport 11.11 (77)	Metricon Stadium
Saturday, 4 May (7:00 pm)	NT Thunder 12.16 (88)	def. by	Morningside 18.9 (117)	TIO Stadium
Sunday, 5 May (1:30 pm)	Labrador 10.11 (71)	def. by	Broadbeach 15.17 (107)	Cooke-Murphy Oval

=== Round 8 ===
	Eastern Conference
Saturday, 11 May (2:00 pm)	Ainslie 22.6 (138)	def.	Queanbeyan 11.10 (76)	Ainslie Oval
Saturday, 11 May (2:00 pm)	Sydney Hills 7.14 (56)	def. by	Eastlake 11.15 (81)	Bruce Purser Reserve
Sunday, 12 May (9:30 am)	UWS Giants 11.12 (78)	def. by	Sydney 19.13 (127)	Bruce Purser Reserve
Sunday, 12 May (11:45 am)	Tuggeranong 7.5 (47)	def. by	Sydney University 19.9 (123)	Greenway Oval
	Bye; Belconnen

Northern Conference
Bye; Aspley, Brisbane, Broadbeach, Gold Coast, Labrador, Morningside, Mount Gravatt, NT Thunder, Redland, Southport

=== Round 9 ===
	Eastern Conference
Saturday, 18 May (12:00 pm)	UWS Giants 7.6 (48)	def. by	Brisbane 20.16 (136)	Blacktown International Sportspark
Saturday, 18 May (2:00 pm)	Sydney Hills 12.16 (88)	def. by	Belconnen 21.15 (141)	Bruce Purser Reserve
Saturday, 18 May (2:00 pm)	Sydney University 17.9 (111)	def.	Ainslie 9.14 (68)	Sydney University Oval
Saturday, 18 May (4:00 pm)	Sydney 23.13 (151)	def.	Queanbeyan 5.8 (38)	Sydney Cricket Ground
	Bye; Eastlake

	Northern Conference
Saturday, 18 May (11:30 am)	Aspley 16.16 (112)	def.	Tuggeranong 5.6 (36)	Graham Road
Saturday, 18 May (12:00 pm)	Morningside 5.10 (40)	def. by	Gold Coast 17.17 (119)	Jack Esplen Oval
Saturday, 18 May (1:30 pm)	Broadbeach 16.5 (101)	def. by	NT Thunder 20.8 (128)	H & A Oval
Saturday, 18 May (1:30 pm)	Mount Gravatt 9.9 (63)	def. by	Southport 16.12 (108)	Dittmer Park
Sunday, 19 May (1:30 pm)	Labrador 8.5 (53)	def. by	Redland 29.19 (193)	Cooke-Murphy Oval

=== Round 10 ===
	Eastern Conference
Saturday, 25 May (10:00 am)	UWS Giants 14.7 (91)	def. by	Gold Coast 18.12 (120)	Blacktown International Sportspark
Saturday, 25 May (11:45 am)	Belconnen 18.11 (119)	def.	Broadbeach 12.11 (83)	Kippax Oval
Saturday, 25 May (2:00 pm)	Ainslie 6.13 (49)	def. by	Sydney 19.9 (123)	Ainslie Oval
Saturday, 25 May (2:00 pm)	Tuggeranong 12.7 (79)	def. by	Sydney Hills 12.15 (87)	Greenway Oval
Saturday, 25 May (2:00 pm)	Eastlake 15.13 (103)	def.	Sydney University 11.9 (75)	StarTrack Oval
	Bye; Queanbeyan

	Northern Conference
Saturday, 25 May (1:30 pm)	Southport 9.22 (76)	def. by	Brisbane 14.4 (88)	Fankhauser Reserve
Saturday, 25 May (1:30 pm)	Labrador 5.7 (37)	def. by	Aspley 19.18 (132)	Cooke-Murphy Oval
Saturday, 25 May (1:30 pm)	Redland 26.12 (168)	def.	Mount Gravatt 6.13 (49)	Tidbold Park
	Bye; Morningside, NT Thunder

=== Round 11 ===
	Eastern Conference
Saturday, 1 June (12:00 pm)	Sydney University 18.13 (121)	def.	Labrador 13.5 (83)	Drummoyne Oval
Saturday, 1 June (1:00 pm)	Sydney 20.20 (140)	def.	Belconnen 6.13 (49)	Sydney Cricket Ground
Saturday, 1 June (2:00 pm)	Tuggeranong 5.2 (32)	def. by	Ainslie 18.9 (117)	Greenway Oval
Saturday, 1 June (4:40 pm)	Sydney Hills 13.11 (89)	def. by	UWS Giants 16.12 (108)	Bruce Purser Reserve
Sunday, 2 June (2:00 pm)	Eastlake 10.4 (64)	def.	Queanbeyan 6.11 (47)	StarTrack Oval

	Northern Conference
Saturday, 1 June (1:30 pm)	Brisbane 10.10 (70)	def. by	Gold Coast 17.15 (117)	Giffin Park
Saturday, 1 June (1:30 pm)	Morningside 11.12 (78)	def. by	Aspley 18.8 (116)	Jack Esplen Oval
Saturday, 1 June (3:30 pm)	NT Thunder 13.15 (93)	def. by	Southport 15.12 (102)	TIO Stadium
Sunday, 2 June (1:30 pm)	Mount Gravatt 9.14 (68)	def. by	Broadbeach 21.14 (140)	Dittmer Park
	Bye; Redland

=== Round 12 ===
Eastern Conference
Bye; Ainslie, Belconnen, Eastlake, Queanbeyan, Sydney Hills, Sydney University, Tuggeranong

	Northern Conference
Saturday, 8 June (3:00 pm)	Gold Coast 10.10 (70)	def.	Sydney 7.8 (50)	Metricon Stadium
Saturday, 8 June (7:00 pm)	NT Thunder 10.15 (75)	def. by	UWS Giants 17.18 (120)	TIO Stadium
Sunday, 9 June (1:30 pm)	Southport 11.9 (75)	def.	Morningside 8.11 (59)	Fankhauser Reserve
Sunday, 9 June (1:30 pm)	Aspley 20.14 (134)	def.	Mount Gravatt 6.7 (43)	Graham Road
Sunday, 9 June (1:30 pm)	Broadbeach 13.8 (86)	def.	Redland 11.10 (76)	H & A Oval
	Bye; Brisbane, Labrador

=== Round 13 ===
	Eastern Conference
Saturday, 15 June (11:45 am)	Eastlake 13.10 (88)	def.	Redland 9.13 (67)	StarTrack Oval
Saturday, 15 June (2:00 pm)	Sydney Hills 16.23 (119)	def.	Ainslie 9.9 (63)	Bruce Purser Reserve
Saturday, 15 June (2:00 pm)	Tuggeranong 8.5 (53)	def. by	Queanbeyan 22.12 (144)	Greenway Oval
Saturday, 15 June (2:00 pm)	Sydney University 11.15 (81)	def. by	Belconnen 16.18 (114)	Sydney University Oval
Sunday, 16 June (9:30 am)	UWS Giants 13.10 (88)	def. by	Gold Coast 17.7 (109)	Blacktown International Sportspark
	Bye; Sydney

	Northern Conference
Saturday, 15 June (1:30 pm)	Broadbeach 6.8 (44)	def. by	Morningside 18.16 (124)	H & A Oval
Saturday, 15 June (1:30 pm)	Labrador 5.5 (35)	def. by	Brisbane 20.14 (134)	Cooke-Murphy Oval
Saturday, 15 June (1:30 pm)	Mount Gravatt 10.9 (69)	def. by	NT Thunder 21.18 (144)	Dittmer Park
	Bye; Aspley, Southport

=== Round 14 ===
	Eastern Conference
Saturday, 22 June (11:45 am)	Ainslie 20.10 (130)	def.	Belconnen 15.6 (96)	StarTrack Oval
Saturday, 22 June (2:30 pm)	Eastlake 10.16 (76)	def.	Tuggeranong 9.6 (60)	StarTrack Oval
Sunday, 23 June (11:45 am)	Queanbeyan 11.11 (77)	def. by	Sydney University 13.13 (91)	Dairy Farmers Park
	Bye; UWS Giants

	Northern Conference
Saturday, 22 June (1:00 pm)	Redland 17.19 (121)	def.	Sydney Hills 13.14 (92)	Tidbold Park
Saturday, 22 June (1:30 pm)	Labrador 9.10 (64)	def. by	Southport 26.14 (170)	Cooke-Murphy Oval
Saturday, 22 June (1:30 pm)	Morningside 24.17 (161)	def.	Mount Gravatt 6.7 (43)	Jack Esplen Oval
Saturday, 22 June (3:30 pm)	NT Thunder 16.16 (112)	def.	Sydney 9.5 (59)	Traeger Park
Sunday, 23 June (12:00 pm)	Brisbane 19.20 (134)	def.	Aspley 13.8 (86)	Giffin Park
	Bye; Broadbeach, Gold Coast

=== Round 15 ===
	Eastern Conference
Friday, 28 June (2:00 pm)	Sydney 9.3 (57)	def. by	Brisbane 19.11 (125)	Blacktown International Sportspark
Saturday, 29 June (2:00 pm)	Tuggeranong 7.5 (47)	def. by	Belconnen 18.10 (118)	Greenway Oval
Saturday, 29 June (2:00 pm)	Sydney University 5.14 (44)	def. by	Sydney Hills 9.5 (59)	Henson Park
Saturday, 29 June (2:00 pm)	Eastlake 14.6 (90)	def. by	Ainslie 16.9 (105)	StarTrack Oval
Sunday, 30 June (11:45 am)	Queanbeyan 9.7 (61)	def. by	UWS Giants 28.19 (187)	Dairy Farmers Park

	Northern Conference
Saturday, 29 June (1:30 pm)	Mount Gravatt 8.11 (59)	def. by	Aspley 18.18 (126)	Dittmer Park
Saturday, 29 June (1:30 pm)	Redland 12.13 (85)	def.	Labrador 10.4 (64)	Tidbold Park
Saturday, 29 June (6:00 pm)	Southport 12.11 (83)	def.	Broadbeach 6.10 (46)	Fankhauser Reserve
Saturday, 29 June (7:00 pm)	NT Thunder 22.16 (148)	def.	Gold Coast 15.11 (101)	TIO Stadium
	Bye; Morningside

=== Round 16 ===
	Eastern Conference
Saturday, 6 July (9:35 am)	UWS Giants 28.22 (190)	def.	Tuggeranong 0.4 (4)	StarTrack Oval
Saturday, 6 July (12:00 pm)	Eastlake 7.7 (49)	def. by	Sydney 15.19 (109)	North Dalton Park
Sunday, 7 July (11:45 am)	Ainslie 16.14 (110)	def.	Sydney University 9.12 (66)	Ainslie Oval
Sunday, 7 July (11:45 am)	Belconnen 22.20 (152)	def.	Sydney Hills 12.17 (89)	Kippax Oval
	Bye; Queanbeyan

	Northern Conference
Saturday, 6 July (12:00 pm)	Brisbane 15.17 (107)	def.	Gold Coast 13.7 (85)	Giffin Park
Saturday, 6 July (1:30 pm)	Broadbeach 10.8 (68)	def. by	Aspley 17.15 (117)	H & A Oval
Saturday, 6 July (1:30 pm)	Labrador 6.11 (47)	def. by	Mount Gravatt 15.13 (103)	Cooke-Murphy Oval
Sunday, 7 July (1:30 pm)	Morningside 14.13 (97)	def. by	Southport 18.15 (123)	Jack Esplen Oval
	Bye; NT Thunder, Redland

=== Round 17 ===
	Eastern Conference
Saturday, 13 July (2:00 pm)	Sydney University 22.16 (148)	def.	Tuggeranong 8.9 (57)	Drummoyne Oval
Saturday, 13 July (2:00 pm)	Eastlake 15.12 (102)	def.	Sydney Hills 11.10 (76)	Football Park
Sunday, 14 July (9:30 am)	Sydney 12.7 (79)	def. by	UWS Giants 21.16 (142)	Sydney Cricket Ground
Sunday, 14 July (2:00 pm)	Queanbeyan 11.6 (72)	def. by	Belconnen 20.16 (136)	Dairy Farmers Park
	Bye; Ainslie

	Northern Conference
Saturday, 13 July (1:30 pm)	Brisbane 19.19 (133)	def.	Redland 8.7 (55)	Giffin Park
Saturday, 13 July (1:30 pm)	Aspley 16.13 (109)	drew with	Gold Coast 17.7 (109)	Graham Road
Saturday, 13 July (1:30 pm)	Morningside 19.14 (128)	def.	NT Thunder 9.15 (69)	Jack Esplen Oval
Sunday, 14 July (1:30 pm)	Broadbeach 12.8 (80)	def.	Labrador 10.12 (72)	H & A Oval
	Bye; Mount Gravatt, Southport

=== Round 18 ===
	Eastern Conference
Saturday, 20 July (11:15 am)	Eastlake 8.14 (62)	def.	Belconnen 7.11 (53)	Ainslie Oval
Saturday, 20 July (11:45 am)	Sydney Hills 13.11 (89)	def. by	Queanbeyan 20.12 (132)	Bruce Purser Reserve
Saturday, 20 July (2:15 pm)	Ainslie 19.15 (129)	def.	Tuggeranong 3.3 (21)	Ainslie Oval
	Bye; Sydney University, UWS Giants

	Northern Conference
Saturday, 20 July (1:00 pm)	Gold Coast 9.10 (64)	def. by	Sydney 12.13 (85)	Metricon Stadium
Saturday, 20 July (1:30 pm)	Aspley 17.7 (109)	def.	Southport 11.16 (82)	Graham Road
Saturday, 20 July (1:30 pm)	Morningside 11.4 (70)	def. by	Redland 19.14 (128)	Jack Esplen Oval
Saturday, 20 July (3:30 pm)	NT Thunder 12.18 (90)	def.	Brisbane 11.17 (83)	TIO Stadium
Sunday, 21 July (1:30 pm)	Broadbeach 14.12 (96)	def.	Mount Gravatt 6.11 (47)	H & A Oval
	Bye; Labrador

=== Round 19 ===
	Eastern Conference
Saturday, 27 July (2:00 pm)	Sydney University 17.13 (115)	def.	Queanbeyan 10.5 (65)	Drummoyne Oval
Saturday, 27 July (2:00 pm)	Belconnen 17.16 (118)	def.	Ainslie 10.12 (72)	Kippax Oval
	Bye; Eastlake, Sydney Hills, Sydney, Tuggeranong

	Northern Conference
Friday, 26 July (7:00 pm)	Redland 13.8 (86)	def.	Aspley 10.9 (69)	Leyshon Park
Saturday, 27 July (10:05 am)	Gold Coast 14.11 (95)	def.	UWS Giants 14.10 (94)	Metricon Stadium
Saturday, 27 July (10:30 am)	Southport 24.9 (153)	def.	Mount Gravatt 11.13 (79)	Leyshon Park
Saturday, 27 July (1:30 pm)	Labrador 8.6 (54)	def. by	NT Thunder 29.17 (191)	Leyshon Park
Saturday, 27 July (4:30 pm)	Morningside 17.17 (119)	def.	Broadbeach 9.9 (63)	Leyshon Park
	Bye; Brisbane

=== Round 20 ===
	Eastern Conference
Saturday, 3 August (10:05 am)	UWS Giants 34.18 (222)	def.	Sydney University 4.6 (30)	Blacktown International Sportspark
Saturday, 3 August (2:00 pm)	Sydney Hills 18.13 (121)	def.	Tuggeranong 11.11 (77)	Bruce Purser Reserve
Sunday, 4 August (2:00 pm)	Ainslie 10.16 (76)	def.	Queanbeyan 10.13 (73)	Ainslie Oval
	Bye; Belconnen

	Northern Conference
Saturday, 3 August (1:00 pm)	Southport 16.13 (109)	def.	Eastlake 9.5 (59)	Fankhauser Reserve
Saturday, 3 August (1:30 pm)	Brisbane 17.17 (119)	def.	Sydney 13.8 (86)	Giffin Park
Saturday, 3 August (1:30 pm)	Aspley 18.17 (125)	def.	Labrador 12.11 (83)	Graham Road
Saturday, 3 August (3:30 pm)	NT Thunder 15.8 (98)	def.	Redland 24.14 (158)	Traeger Park
Sunday, 4 August (1:30 pm)	Mount Gravatt 10.15 (75)	def. by	Morningside 11.13 (79)	Dittmer Park
	Bye; Broadbeach, Gold Coast

=== Round 21 ===
	Eastern Conference
Saturday, 10 August (2:00 pm)	Tuggeranong 9.7 (61)	def. by	Eastlake 16.7 (103)	Greenway Oval
Saturday, 10 August (4:00 pm)	Sydney 15.20 (110)	def.	UWS Giants 6.9 (45)	ANZ Stadium
Sunday, 11 August (2:00 pm)	Sydney Hills 14.11 (95)	def.	Sydney University 13.8 (86)	Bruce Purser Reserve
Sunday, 11 August (2:00 pm)	Queanbeyan 15.17 (107)	def.	Belconnen 12.10 (82)	Dairy Farmers Park
	Bye; Ainslie

	Northern Conference
Saturday, 10 August (1:30 pm)	Southport 18.19 (127)	def.	NT Thunder 8.11 (59)	Fankhauser Reserve
Saturday, 10 August (1:30 pm)	Mount Gravatt 11.8 (74)	def. by	Brisbane 23.17 (155)	Leyshon Park
Saturday, 10 August (1:30 pm)	Redland 20.15 (135)	def.	Broadbeach 18.17 (115)	Tidbold Park
Saturday, 10 August (3:55 pm)	Gold Coast 26.24 (180)	def.	Labrador 4.11 (35)	Metricon Stadium
	Bye; Aspley, Morningside

=== Round 22 ===
	Eastern Conference
Saturday, 17 August (2:00 pm)	Ainslie 14.12 (96)	def.	Eastlake 9.11 (65)	Ainslie Oval
Saturday, 17 August (2:00 pm)	Queanbeyan 11.13 (79)	def.	Sydney Hills 10.17 (77)	Dairy Farmers Park
Saturday, 17 August (2:00 pm)	Belconnen 30.11 (191)	def.	Tuggeranong 7.4 (46)	Kippax Oval
Sunday, 18 August (11:40 am)	Sydney University 8.8 (56)	def. by	Sydney 18.23 (131)	Sydney Cricket Ground

	Northern Conference
Saturday, 17 August (1:00 pm)	Brisbane 15.15 (105)	def.	UWS Giants 14.10 (94)	Leyshon Park
Saturday, 17 August (1:30 pm)	Broadbeach 21.20 (146)	def.	Gold Coast 7.10 (52)	H & A Oval
Saturday, 17 August (1:30 pm)	Labrador 5.11 (41)	def. by	Morningside 26.8 (164)	Cooke-Murphy Oval
Saturday, 17 August (1:30 pm)	Redland 16.14 (110)	def.	Southport 14.13 (97)	Tidbold Park
Saturday, 17 August (7:00 pm)	NT Thunder 13.10 (114)	def. by	Aspley 17.12 (114)	TIO Stadium
	Bye; Mount Gravatt

== Ladder ==
2013 NEAFL Eastern Conference Ladder
Pos	Team	Pld	W	L	D	PF	PA	PP	Pts
1	Sydney (C)	18	12	6	0	1990	1393	142.9	48
2	Belconnen	18	12	6	0	2133	1568	136.0	48
3	Ainslie	18	11	7	0	1737	1573	110.4	44
4	Eastlake	18	10	8	0	1441	1554	92.7	40
5	UWS Giants	18	9	9	0	2107	1605	131.3	36
6	Queanbeyan	18	9	9	0	1616	1779	90.8	36
7	Sydney Hills	18	7	11	0	1637	1847	88.6	28
8	Sydney University	18	6	12	0	1587	1865	85.1	24
9	Tuggeranong	18	2	16	0	936	2262	41.4	8

Source: www.neafl.com.au
Rules for classification: 1) points; 2) percentage; 3) number of points for.
(C) Conference Premiers

2013 NEAFL Northern Conference Ladder
Pos	Team	Pld	W	L	D	PF	PA	PP	Pts
1	Brisbane (C, P)	18	16	2	0	2165	1308	165.5	64
2	Southport	18	14	4	0	1934	1362	142.0	56
3	Aspley	18	12	5	1	1960	1467	133.6	50
4	Morningside	18	11	7	0	1825	1508	121.0	44
5	Redland	18	11	7	0	1862	1656	112.4	44
6	Gold Coast	18	10	7	1	1850	1658	111.6	42
7	NT Thunder	18	9	9	0	2008	1809	111.0	36
8	Broadbeach	18	7	11	0	1540	1776	86.7	28
9	Mount Gravatt	18	1	17	0	1126	2259	49.8	4
10	Labrador	18	1	17	0	1112	2316	48.0	4

Source: www.neafl.com.au
Rules for classification: 1) points; 2) percentage; 3) number of points for.
(C) Conference Premiers; (P) Premiers

== Finals series ==
=== Week 1 ===
	Eastern Conference Qualifying Final
Saturday, 24 August (2:00 pm)	Belconnen 18.16 (124)	def.	Ainslie 12.14 (86)	Kippax Oval

	Northern Conference Qualifying Final
Saturday, 24 August (1:30 pm)	Southport 10.14 (74)	def. by	Aspley 17.16 (118)	Fankhauser Reserve

	Eastern Conference Elimination Final
Saturday, 24 August (2:00 pm)	Eastlake 9.10 (64)	def. by	UWS Giants 18.16 (124)	Dairy Farmers Park

	Northern Conference Elimination Final
Sunday, 25 August (1:30 pm)	Morningside 11.18 (84)	def. by	Redland 13.11 (89)	Jack Esplen Oval

=== Week 2 ===
	Eastern Conference Semi-finals
Saturday, 31 August (11:45 am)	Ainslie 15.15 (105)	def.	UWS Giants 5.11 (41)	Ainslie Oval
Saturday, 31 August (12:00 pm)	Sydney 23.12 (150)	def.	Belconnen 10.9 (69)	Blacktown International Sportspark

	Northern Conference Semi-finals
Saturday, 31 August (1:30 pm)	Southport 16.13 (109)	def.	Redland 11.12 (78)	Fankhauser Reserve
Saturday, 31 August (1:30 pm)	Brisbane 16.10 (106)	def.	Aspley 15.14 (104)	Graham Road

=== Week 3 ===
	Eastern Conference Preliminary Final
Saturday, 7 September (2:00 pm)	Belconnen 18.15 (123)	def.	Ainslie 16.11 (107)	Kippax Oval

	Northern Conference Preliminary Final
Sunday, 8 September (2:15 pm)	Aspley 20.15 (135)	def.	Southport 8.21 (69)	Leyshon Park

=== Week 4 ===
	Eastern Conference Grand Final
Sunday, 15 September (2:15 pm)	Sydney 15.11 (101)	def.	Belconnen 6.13 (49)	Kippax Oval

	Northern Conference Grand Final
Sunday, 15 September (1:15 pm)	Brisbane 19.11 (125)	def.	Aspley 11.13 (79)	Leyshon Park

=== Week 5 ===
	NEAFL Grand Final
Saturday, 21 September (12:30 pm)	Brisbane 12.9 (81)	def.	Sydney 10.13 (73)	Graham Road

== State games ==
The two NEAFL conferences participated in state games in 2013, with the NEAFL Eastern Conference (NSW/ACT) competing against the Tasmanian State League and the NEAFL Northern Conference (QLD/NT) competing against the South Australian National Football League.

State Game 5 May 2013; 2:00 EST	South Australia (SANFL)	140 - 58 stand alone game	QLD/NT (NEAFL North)	Richmond Oval, Adelaide match report
	4.3 (27); 7.5 (47); 14.10 (94); 21.14 (140)	match report	1.1 (7); 6.2 (38); 8.2 (50); 9.4 (58)
		Goals
	Ryswyk 6, Wundke 4, Ainger 2, Beech 2, Caire 2, Campbell 1, Liddle 1, Gray 1, O’Hara 1, Meiklejohn 1		Dunne 2, Michael 2, Kiel 1, Walton 1, Shelton 1, Vassal 1, Davey 1
		Bests
	Ferguson, Thomas, Boyd, Ryswyk, O’Hara, Parry, Liddle, Thring		Michael, Ilett, Davey, Stiller, Dzufer.

State Game 8 June 2013; 2:00 EST	NSW/ACT (NEAFL East)	61 - 101 stand alone game	Tasmania (TSL)	Skoda Stadium, Sydney match report
	8.13 (61)	match report	15.11 (101)
		Goals
	J. Bennett 4, A. Dess 2, W. Griggs 2		M. Thorp 6, B. McCulloch 3, S. Whiting 3, J. Blackberry 2, B. Jones 1
		Bests
	K. Stevens, J. Van Meurs, M. O’Dywer, T. Barton, A. Vandenberg, W. Griggs		B. McCulloch, M. Thorp, N. McKenna, S. Carins, J. Bowden, D. Banham

== Foxtel Cup ==
Three NEAFL clubs were extended an invitation to compete in the Foxtel Cup knockout competition for 2013. These clubs were 2012 Northern Conference runners up Northern Territory, 2012 Eastern Conference premiers Queanbeyan and 2012 Northern Conference third-ranked team Southport. Their results are shown below:

=== Qualifying round ===
Qualifier 13 April 2013; 11:35 EST	Queanbeyan	88 – 35 AFL curtain raiser match	NT Thunder	StarTrack Oval match report match statistics
	2.3 (15); 6.5 (41); 10.6 (66); 13.10 (88)	Match report	2.2 (14); 3.3 (21); 3.8 (26); 4.11 (35)
		Goals
	Stevens 4, Fulford 3, Quade 3, Griggs, Conroy, Kavanagh		Ngalkin 2, Ilett, Dunn
		Bests
	Stevens, Klemke, Fulford, Conroy		Ilett, Ngalkin, Lockwood, Vassal

Qualifier 20 April 2013; 14:35 EST	Southport	77 – 49 AFL curtain raiser match	Burnie	Metricon Stadium match report match statistics
	4.1 (25); 7.5 (47); 10.6 (66); 11.11 (77)	Source:	3.1 (19); 4.1 (25); 4.4 (28); 7.7 (49)
		Goals
	Baxter 3, Kiel 2, Merrett 2, Carr, Mills, Thynne, Screech		Laycock 3, Baldock 2, Morrison, Hayes
		Bests
	Baxter, Mills, Burge, Wise		Banham, Laycock, Barrett, Munday

=== Round 1 ===
Game #2 28 May 2013; 20:35 EST	Werribee	113 - 28 stand alone game	Queanbeyan	Etihad Stadium match report match statistics
	5.3 (33); 6.8 (44); 9.14 (68); 16.17 (113)	match report	1.1 (7); 2.2 (14); 3.4 (22); 4.4 (28)
		Goals
	Brown 3, Maric 3, McGennis 2, Clouston 2, Sierakowski 2, Ross, Tudor, Castello, Speight		Stevens 2, Griggs, Franchi
		Bests
	Gysberts, Sierakowski, Hine, Kennedy, Brown, Maric		Conroy, Stevens, Klemke, Daniher, Atkinson, Griggs

Gamel #4 18 June 2013; 18:35 WST	Claremont	80 - 26 stand alone game	Southport	Patersons Stadium match report match statistics
	5.3 (33); 8.4 (52); 10.5 (65); 12.8 (80)	match report	0.1 (1); 1.2 (8); 3.2 (20); 4.2 (26)
		Goals
	McGovern 3, Richardson 3, Court 2, Knott, Winmar, Davies, Swift		Pope, Kiel, Mallan, Mills
		Bests
	McGovern, Daniher, Davies, Richardson		Pope, Thynne, Kiel, Whish-Wilson

== Awards ==
=== Eastern conference ===
- The Mulrooney Medal was awarded to James Bennett of Belconnen.
- The NEAFL (Eastern) Rising Star was awarded to Brent Macleod of Tuggeranong.
- The NEAFL (Eastern) leading goal kicker was awarded to Josh Bennett of Ainslie, who kicked 61 goals.
- The NEAFL (Eastern) goal of the year was awarded to Andrew Dess of Belconnen, for his goal in round 19.
- The NEAFL (Eastern) mark of the year was awarded to Marcus Crook of Ainslie, for his mark in round 8.
- The NEAFL (Eastern) coach of the year was awarded to Matthew Lokan of Belconnen.

=== Northern conference ===
- The Grogan Medal was awarded to Haydn Kiel of Southport, who polled 21 votes.
- The Syd Guilford Trophy was awarded to Cheynee Stiller of Aspley, who polled 45 votes.
- The NEAFL (Northern) Rising Star was awarded to Josh Smith of Morningside.
- The Ray Hughson Medal was awarded to Darren Ewing of NT Thunder, who kicked 94 goals.
- The NEAFL (Northern) coach of the year was awarded to John Blair of Aspley.

== Team of the year ==
=== Eastern conference ===
2013 Eastern Conference Team of the Year
B:	Shane Biggs (Sydney)	John Van Meurs (Eastlake)	Cameron Campbell (Belconnen)
HB:	Kade Klemke (Queanbeyan)	Tim Barton (Sydney University)	Sam Darley (UWS Giants)
C:	Aaron vandenBerg (Ainslie)	Anthony Miles (UWS Giants)	Jake Lloyd (Sydney)
HF:	Ash Harris (Ainslie)	Andrew Dess (Belconnen)	Dan Robinson (Sydney)
F:	Tim Barrett (Sydney University)	Josh Bennett (Ainslie)	Matthew Lokan (Queanbeyan)
Foll:	Tom Downie (UWS Giants)	James Bennett (Belconnen)	Kaine Stevens (Queanbeyan)
Int:	Brent Macleod (Tuggeranong)	Nick Heyne (Ainslie)	Trent Stubbs (Sydney Hills)
Int:	Matthew Porter (Belconnen)		
Coach:	N/A		

=== Northern conference ===
2013 Northern Conference Team of the Year
B:	Brad Howard (Redland)	Michael Hutchinson (Aspley)	Wayde Mills (Southport)
HB:	Daniel Wise (Southport)	Scott Clarke (Morningside)	Daniel Dzufer (Redland)
C:	Cheynee Stiller (Aspley)	Cameron Ilett (NT Thunder)	Patrick Karnezis (Brisbane)
HF:	Chris Dunne (NT Thunder)	Steven Gaertner (Redland)	Josh Baxter (Gold Coast)
F:	Jason Burge (Southport)	Darren Ewing (NT Thunder)	Jack Martin (Gold Coast)
Foll:	Fraser Thurlow (Labrador)	Jack Crisp (Brisbane)	Haydn Kiel (Broadbeach)
Int:	Ryan Matthews (Aspley)	Adam Eckermann (Mount Gravatt)	Mitch Brewer (Broadbeach)
Int:	Paul Shelton (Morningside)		
Coach:	N/A		

== AFL draftees ==
Draft pick	Player	Club	Drafted to
9_{R}	Fraser Thurlow	Labrador	Fremantle
46_{R}	Jarred Ellis	Broadbeach	Gold Coast
51_{R}	Archie Smith	Mount Gravatt	Brisbane Lions

R – rookie draft
