= 2014 NEAFL season =

- Teams: 14
- Premiers: Aspley; 1st premiership
- Minor premiers: UWS Giants; 1st minor premiership
- NEAFL MVP: Matthew Payne; Aspley (102 votes)
- Leading goalkicker: Cleve Hughes; Redland (79 goals)
- Matches played: 131

The 2014 NEAFL season was the fourth season of the North East Australian Football League (NEAFL) in Australia. The season began on Saturday, 29 March and concluded on Saturday, 13 September with the NEAFL Grand Final.

The Brisbane-based team Aspley were the premiers for the season after they defeated the Sydney Swans reserves by two points in the Grand Final due to a goal kicked moments before final siren.

== League structure ==
For the first time since the NEAFL's inception in November 2010, a major restructure of the league occurred ahead of the 2014 season. The total number of clubs in the competition was reduced from 19 to 14, with Tuggeranong (ACT), Broadbeach (QLD), Labrador (QLD), Morningside (QLD) and Mt Gravatt (QLD) all having their licenses revoked.

The conference system which resulted in clubs being geographically split into either an Eastern (NSW/ACT) or Northern (QLD/NT) conference was abolished and was replaced by a single competition ladder structure, ensuring the top 6 teams at the end of the home and away season would progress to a finals series.

Although North Queensland was considered to be a strategic area for future AFL expansion, NEAFL executives elected not to base a team in the region for the 2014 season.

== Participating clubs ==
2014 NEAFL Participating Clubs
Club	Location	Home ground
Ainslie	Canberra, ACT	Alan Ray Oval
Aspley	Brisbane, QLD	Graham Road
Belconnen	Canberra, ACT	StarTrack Oval
Brisbane	Brisbane, QLD	Giffin Park
Eastlake	Canberra, ACT	StarTrack Oval
Gold Coast	Gold Coast, QLD	Metricon Stadium
NT Thunder	Darwin, NT	TIO Stadium
Queanbeyan	Canberra, ACT	Dairy Farmers Park
Redland	Brisbane, QLD	Tidbold Park
Southport	Gold Coast, QLD	Fankhauser Reserve
Sydney Hills	Sydney, NSW	Bruce Purser Reserve
Sydney	Sydney, NSW	Sydney Cricket Ground
Sydney University	Sydney, NSW	Sydney Cricket Ground
UWS Giants	Sydney, NSW	Spotless Stadium

== Premiership season ==
Source: NEAFL season 2014 results and fixtures

=== Round 1 ===
	Round 1
Saturday, 29 March (12:00 pm)	Ainslie 27.11 (173)	def.	Sydney Hills 17.12 (114)	Alan Ray Oval
Saturday, 29 March (12:00 9m)	Aspley 25.22 (172)	def.	Belconnen 2.5 (17)	Graham Road
Saturday, 29 March (1:30 pm)	Southport 12.16 (88)	def.	Gold Coast 9.4 (58)	Fankhauser Reserve
Saturday, 29 March (7:00 pm)	NT Thunder 14.11 (95)	def.	UWS Giants 9.15 (69)	TIO Stadium
Sunday, 30 March (3:15 pm)	Brisbane 4.11 (35)	def. by	Sydney 12.17 (89)	Gabba
	Bye; Eastlake, Queanbeyan, Redland, Sydney University

=== Round 2 ===
	Round 2
Saturday, 5 April (11:45 am)	Sydney Hills 5.13 (43)	def. by	Southport 13.19 (97)	Bruce Purser Reserve
Saturday, 5 April (11:50 am)	Gold Coast 7.8 (50)	def. by	Brisbane 20.19 (139)	Metricon Stadium
Saturday, 5 April (12:00 pm)	Ainslie 10.10 (70)	def. by	Redland 16.12 (108)	Alan Ray Oval
Saturday, 5 April (7:00 pm)	NT Thunder 17.11 (113)	def.	Aspley 13.17 (95)	TIO Stadium
Sunday, 6 April (9:30 am)	UWS Giants 11.20 (86)	def.	Sydney 12.6 (78)	Spotless Stadium
Sunday, 6 April (12:00 pm)	Queanbeyan 5.7 (37)	def. by	Sydney University 15.19 (109)	Dairy Farmers Park

=== Round 3 ===
	Round 3
Saturday, 12 April (12:00 pm)	Belconnen 1.11 (17)	def. by	UWS Giants 18.20 (128)	Kippax Oval
Saturday, 12 April (1:30 pm)	Redland 22.15 (147)	def.	Brisbane 5.10 (40)	Tidbold Park
Saturday, 12 April (2:00 pm)	Sydney Hills 12.9 (81)	def. by	Sydney University 16.7 (103)	Bruce Purser Reserve
Saturday, 12 April (3:50 pm)	Gold Coast 8.17 (65)	def. by	NT Thunder 16.6 (102)	Metricon Stadium
Sunday, 13 April (9:30 am)	Sydney 26.11 (167)	def. by	Queanbeyan 3.12 (30)	Blacktown International Sportspark
Sunday, 13 April (1:30 pm)	Southport 8.18 (66)	def.	Aspley 6.10 (46)	Fankhauser Reserve
Sunday, 13 April (2:00 pm)	Ainslie 17.8 (110)	def.	Eastlake 10.8 (68)	Alan Ray Oval

=== Round 4 ===
	Round 4
Saturday, 19 April (1:00 pm)	Sydney 19.17 (131)	def.	Gold Coast 4.7 (31)	Sydney Cricket Ground
Saturday, 19 April (1:30 pm)	Aspley 12.8 (80)	def. by	Brisbane 15.13 (103)	Graham Road
Saturday, 19 April (1:30 pm)	Redland 15.11 (101)	def.	Southport 12.13 (85)	Tidbold Park
Saturday, 19 April (2:00 pm)	Queanbeyan 20.17 (137)	def.	Belconnen 16.9 (105)	Dairy Farmers Park
Saturday, 19 April (2:00 pm)	Sydney University 11.10 (76)	def. by	Eastlake 12.13 (85)	Drummoyne Oval
Saturday, 19 April (7:00 pm)	NT Thunder 22.14 (146)	def.	Sydney Hills 3.6 (24)	TIO Stadium
	Bye; Ainslie, UWS Giants

=== Round 5 ===
	Round 5
Friday, 25 April (1:30 pm)	Brisbane 6.14 (50)	def. by	Sydney 7.9 (51)	Harrup Park
Friday, 25 April (7:00 pm)	NT Thunder 15.15 (105)	def.	10.11 (71) Redland	TIO Stadium
Saturday, 26 April (9:50 am)	Gold Coast 9.8 (62)	def. by	UWS Giants 17.20 (122)	Metricon Stadium
Saturday, 26 April (11:30 am)	Eastlake 2.9 (21)	def. by	Southport 22.18 (150)	Football Park
Saturday, 26 April (12:00 pm)	Sydney University 14.7 (91)	def.	Ainslie 13.12 (90)	Blacktown International Sportspark
Saturday, 26 April (12:00 pm)	Sydney Hills 16.17 (113)	def.	Belconnen 11.6 (72)	Bruce Purser Reserve
Saturday, 26 April (12:00 pm)	Queanbeyan 6.14 (50)	def. by	Aspley 15.10 (100)	Dairy Farmers Park

=== Round 6 ===
	Round 6
Saturday, 3 May (10:10 am)	UWS Giants 16.12 (108)	def.	Ainslie 9.5 (59)	StarTrack Oval
Saturday, 3 May (12:00 pm)	Sydney Hills 9.10 (64)	def. by	Redland 9.18 (72)	Bruce Purser Reserve
Saturday, 3 May (7:00 pm)	NT Thunder 12.14 (86)	def.	Southport 10.8 (68)	TIO Stadium
Sunday, 4 May (12:00 pm)	Belconnen 7.16 (58)	def.	Sydney University 8.8 (56)	Kippax Oval
Sunday, 4 May (1:30 pm)	Aspley 13.17 (95)	def.	Gold Coast 7.10 (52)	Graham Road
Sunday, 4 May (2:00 pm)	Eastlake 6.7 (43)	def. by	Queanbeyan 18.13 (121)	StarTrack Oval
	Bye; Brisbane, Sydney

=== Round 7 ===
	Round 7
Friday, 9 May (4:10 pm)	Sydney 14.16 (100)	def.	UWS Giants 3.7 (25)	ANZ Stadium
Saturday, 10 May (11:00 am)	Southport 12.11 (83)	def.	Brisbane 7.8 (50)	H & A Oval
Saturday, 10 May (12:00 pm)	Eastlake 8.9 (57)	def. by	Sydney Hills 12.15 (87)	StarTrack Oval
Saturday, 10 May (12:00 pm)	Sydney University 14.16 (100)	def.	Queanbeyan 14.8 (92)	Sydney University Oval
Saturday, 10 May (1:30 pm)	Aspley 24.15 (159)	def.	NT Thunder 4.10 (34)	Graham Road
Saturday, 10 May (2:00 pm)	Belconnen 9.7 (61)	def. by	Ainslie 13.13 (91)	Kippax Oval
	Bye; Gold Coast, Redland

=== Round 8 ===
	Round 8
Saturday, 17 May (12:00 pm)	Eastlake 3.7 (25)	def. by	Sydney 23.18 (156)	StarTrack Oval
Saturday, 17 May (2:00 pm)	Ainslie 15.15 (105)	def.	Queanbeyan 9.7 (61)	Alan Ray Oval
Saturday, 17 May (2:00 pm)	Sydney Hills 11.8 (74)	def. by	Sydney University 13.13 (91)	Bruce Purser Reserve
Saturday, 17 May (7:00 pm)	NT Thunder 19.14 (128)	def.	Brisbane 8.11 (59)	TIO Stadium
Sunday, 18 May (1:30 pm)	Redland 23.18 (156)	def.	Gold Coast 8.9 (57)	Tidbold Park
	Bye; Aspley, Belconnen, Southport, UWS Giants
Sydney Swans midfielder, Tom Mitchell, accumulated 64 disposals in the Swans' victory over Eastlake. It is believed to be a record based on Champion Data statistics.

=== Round 9 ===
	Round 9
Sunday, 25 May (11:30 am)	Gold Coast 2.7 (19)	def. by	UWS Giants 32.18 (210)	Metricon Stadium
	Bye; Ainslie, Aspley,Belconnen, Brisbane, Eastlake, NT Thunder, Queanbeyan, Redland, Southport, Sydney Hills, Sydney, Sydney University, Tuggeranong

=== Round 10 ===
	Round 10
Saturday, 31 May (10:30 am)	Sydney University 7.2 (44)	def. by	Aspley 18.10 (118)	Drummoyne Oval
Saturday, 31 May (11:00 am)	Brisbane 20.19 (139)	def.	Gold Coast 12.6 (78)	Moreton Bay Central Sports Complex
Saturday, 31 May (12:00 pm)	Sydney Hills 9.11 (65)	def. by	Ainslie 20.13 (133)	Bruce Purser Reserve
Saturday, 31 May (1:30 pm)	Redland 17.7 (109)	def.	Southport 16.9 (105)	Tidbold Park
Saturday, 31 May (2:00 pm)	Queanbeyan 11.12 (78)	def. by	Belconnen 17.11 (113)	Dairy Farmers Park
Saturday, 31 May (2:00 pm)	Sydney 23.12 (150)	def.	NT Thunder 12.11 (83)	Drummoyne Oval
Sunday, 1 June (12:00 pm)	Eastlake 2.7 (19)	def. by	UWS Giants 19.16 (130)	StarTrack Oval

=== Round 11 ===
	Round 11
Saturday, 7 June (12:00 pm)	Queanbeyan 10.16 (76)	def. by	Sydney Hills 11.19 (85)	Dairy Farmers Park
Saturday, 7 June (12:00 pm)	Sydney University 16.12 (108)	def.	Belconnen 5.9 (39)	Henson Park
Saturday, 7 June (12:00 pm)	Eastlake 7.5 (47)	def. by	Ainslie 10.23 (83)	StarTrack Oval
Saturday, 7 June (1:30 pm)	Brisbane 11.10 (76)	def. by	Redland 16.11 (107)	Giffin Park
Saturday, 7 June (1:30 pm)	Aspley 15.13 (103)	def.	Southport 7.12 (54)	Graham Road
Saturday, 7 June (4:00 pm)	UWS Giants 23.16 (154)	def.	NT Thunder 7.8 (50)	Spotless Stadium
Sunday, 8 June (11:30 am)	Gold Coast 9.12 (66)	def. by	Sydney 12.13 (85)	Metricon Stadium

=== Round 12 ===
	Round 12
Saturday, 14 June (12:00 pm)	Sydney Hills 12.13 (85)	def.	Eastlake 7.13 (55)	Bruce Purser Reserve
Saturday, 14 June (12:00 pm)	Southport 23.10 (148)	def.	Queanbeyan 5.7 (37)	Fankhauser Reserve
Saturday, 14 June (1:00 pm)	Brisbane 10.10 (70)	def. by	UWS Giants 13.14 (92)	Giffin Park
Saturday, 14 June (1:45 pm)	Sydney University 7.5 (47)	def. by	Sydney 9.13 (67)	Blacktown International Sportspark
Saturday, 14 June (2:00 pm)	Belconnen 7.12 (54)	def. by	Ainslie 11.13 (79)	Kippax Oval
Saturday, 14 June (7:00 pm)	NT Thunder 21.16 (142)	def.	Gold Coast 9.9 (63)	TIO Stadium
Sunday, 15 June (1:30 pm)	Aspley 15.11 (101)	def.	Redland 13.7 (85)	Graham Road

=== Round 13 ===
	Round 13
Saturday, 28 June (12:00 pm)	Sydney Hills 12.24 (96)	def.	Queanbeyan 3.9 (27)	Bruce Purser Reserve
Saturday, 28 June (12:00 pm)	Southport 19.12. (126)	def.	Ainslie 7.6 (48)	Fankhauser Reserve
Saturday, 28 June (2:00 pm)	Eastlake 10.9 (69)	def.	Belconnen 8.17 (65)	StarTrack Oval
Saturday, 28 June (3:30 pm)	Brisbane 14.5 (89)	def. by	Aspley 20.20 (140)	The Gabba
Saturday, 28 June (3:30 pm)	Sydney 5.8 (38)	def. by	UWS Giants 10.21 (81)	Sydney Cricket Ground
Saturday, 28 June (7:00 pm)	NT Thunder 19.11 (125)	def.	Sydney University 1.9 (15)	TIO Stadium
Sunday, 29 June (1:30 pm)	Redland 17.17 (119)	def.	Gold Coast 12.11 (83)	Tidbold Park

=== Round 14 ===
	Round 14
Saturday, 5 July (10:30 am)	UWS Giants 25.12 (162)	def.	Brisbane 5.5 (35)	Spotless Stadium
Saturday, 5 July (12:00 pm)	Aspley 17.11 (113)	def.	Sydney Hills 15.12 (102)	Graham Road
Saturday, 5 July (12:00 pm)	Eastlake 19.9 (123)	def.	Sydney University 11.11 (77)	StarTrack Oval
Saturday, 5 July (12:50 pm)	Gold Coast 4.6 (30)	def. by	Southport 25.15 (165)	Metricon Stadium
Saturday, 5 July (3:30 pm)	NT Thunder 22.19 (151)	def.	Redland 12.6 (78)	TIO Stadium
Sunday, 6 July (12:00 pm)	Ainslie 9.10 (64)	def. by	Sydney 10.10 (70)	North Dalton Park
Sunday, 6 July (2:00 pm)	Belconnen 15.11 (101)	def.	Queanbeyan 14.12 (96)	Kippax Oval

=== Round 15 ===
	Round 15
Saturday, 12 July (12:00 pm)	Belconnen 6.11 (47)	def. by	Sydney 9.17 (71)	Kippax Oval
Saturday, 12 July (12:00 pm)	Redland 17.22 (124)	def.	Eastlake 11.6 (72)	Tidbold Park
Saturday, 12 July (2:00 pm)	Ainslie 22.8 (140)	def.	Queanbeyan 8.3 (51)	Alan Ray Oval
Saturday, 12 July (3:30 pm)	Brisbane 16.10 (106)	def. by	NT Thunder 17.5 (107)	The Gabba
Sunday, 13 July (12:00 pm)	UWS Giants 16.16 (112)	def.	Gold Coast 7.5 (57)	Blacktown International Sportspark
Sunday, 13 July (1:30 pm)	Southport 7.6 (48)	def. by	Aspley 13.13 (91)	Fankhauser Reserve
Sunday, 13 July (2:00 pm)	Sydney University 17.5 (107)	def.	Sydney Hills 9.12 (66)	Drummoyne Oval

=== Round 16 ===
	Round 16
Saturday, 19 July (12:00 pm)	Sydney Hills 8.10 (58)	def. by	Ainslie 12.16 (88)	Bruce Purser Reserve
Saturday, 19 July (12:00 pm)	Belconnen 21.17 (143)	def.	Eastlake 9.5 (59)	Kippax Oval
Saturday, 19 July (1:30 pm)	Southport 9.9 (63)	def. by	Redland 10.11 (71)	Fankhauser Reserve
Saturday, 19 July (4:00 pm)	UWS Giants 21.9 (135)	def.	Sydney University 13.12 (90)	Spotless Stadium
	Bye; Aspley, Brisbane, Gold Coast, NT Thunder, Queanbeyan, Sydney

=== Round 17 ===
	Round 17
Saturday, 26 July (11:30 am)	Brisbane 13.11 (89)	def.	Gold Coast 11.11 (77)	Giffin Park
Saturday, 26 July (1:30 pm)	Aspley 19.8 (122)	def.	Redland 15.6 (96)	Graham Road
Saturday, 26 July (2:00 pm)	Queanbeyan 20.13 (133)	def.	Eastlake 11.6 (72)	Dairy Farmers Park
Saturday, 26 July (7:00 pm)	NT Thunder 13.14 (92)	def.	Sydney 8.11 (59)	TIO Stadium
Sunday, 27 July (12:00 pm)	Sydney University 23.13 (151)	def.	Belconnen 14.10 (94)	Drummoyne Oval
	Bye; Ainslie, Southport, Sydney Hills, UWS Giants

=== Round 18 ===
	Round 18
Friday, 1 August (4:10 pm)	Sydney 9.11 (65)	def.	Brisbane 4.14 (38)	Sydney Cricket Ground
Saturday, 2 August (12:00 pm)	Ainslie 11.8 (74)	def. by	Sydney University 16.8 (104)	Alan Ray Oval
Saturday, 2 August (12:00 pm)	UWS Giants 14.18 (102)	def.	Sydney Hills 8.6 (54)	Blacktown International Sportspark
Saturday, 2 August (12:00 pm)	Redland 23.15 (183)	def.	Queanbeyan 9.2 (56)	Tidbold Park
Saturday, 2 August (1:30 pm)	Southport 6.7 (43)	def. by	NT Thunder 12.8 (80)	Fankhauser Reserve
Saturday, 2 August (2:00 pm)	Eastlake 9.8 (62)	def. by	Belconnen 9.13 (67)	StarTrack Oval
Saturday, 2 August (3:50 pm)	Gold Coast 3.6 (24)	def. by	Aspley 26.18 (174)	Metricon Stadium

=== Round 19 ===
	Round 19
Saturday, 9 August (10:00 am)	Sydney 13.14 (92)	def.	Gold Coast 6.10 (46)	Blacktown International Sportspark
Saturday, 9 August (10:00 am)	Queanbeyan 11.11 (77)	def. by	UWS Giants 17.12 (114)	Dairy Farmers Park
Saturday, 9 August (1:00 pm)	Sydney University 13.6 (84)	def. by	Redland 11.20 (86)	Blacktown International Sportspark
Saturday, 9 August (1:30 pm)	Brisbane 18.12 (120)	def.	Southport 6.11 (47)	Burpengary
Saturday, 9 August (3:30 pm)	NT Thunder 15.7 (97)	def.	Aspley 9.4 (58)	TIO Traeger Park
Sunday, 10 August (12:00 pm)	Belconnen 8.18 (66)	def. by	Sydney Hills 11.11 (77)	Gungahlin Town Centre
Sunday, 10 August (2:00 pm)	Ainslie 21.16 (142)	def.	Eastlake 7.8 (50)	Alan Ray Oval

=== Round 20 ===
	Round 20
Saturday, 16 August (10:05 am)	Sydney 11.12 (78)	def.	UWS Giants 11.11 (77)	Sydney Cricket Ground
Saturday, 16 August (10:20 am)	Gold Coast 5.5 (35)	def. by	Brisbane 14.11 (95)	Metricon Stadium
Saturday, 16 August (10:45 am)	Belconnen 16.11 (107)	def.	Southport 13.8 (86)	Kippax Oval
Saturday, 16 August (12:00 pm)	Aspley 10.16 (76)	def.	Eastlake 0.2 (2)	Graham Road
Saturday, 16 August (1:30 pm)	Redland 9.8 (62)	def. by	NT Thunder 11.7 (73)	Tidbold Park
Sunday, 17 August (2:00 pm)	Queanbeyan 9.10 (64)	def. by	Ainslie 12.9 (81)	Dairy Farmers Park
	Bye; Sydney Hills, Sydney University

=== Round 21 ===
	Round 21
Saturday, 23 August (12:00 pm)	Southport 7.9 (51)	def. by	Sydney University 10.5 (65)	Fankhauser Reserve
Saturday, 23 August (1:00 pm)	UWS Giants 17.11 (113)	def.	Brisbane 14.14 (98)	Spotless Stadium
Saturday, 23 August (1:30 pm)	Redland 5.10 (40)	def.	Aspley 4.7 (31)	Tidbold Park
Saturday, 23 August (2:00 pm)	Ainslie 16.12 (108)	def.	Belconnen 7.11 (53)	Alan Ray Oval
Saturday, 23 August (2:00 pm)	Queanbeyan 15.16 (106)	def.	Eastlake 11.4 (70)	Dairy Farmers Park
Sunday, 24 August (12:00 pm)	Sydney Hills 12.11 (83)	def. by	Sydney 18.9 (117)	Bruce Purser Reserve
	Bye; Gold Coast, NT Thunder

== Ladder ==
2014 NEAFL Ladder
Pos	Team	Pld	W	L	D	PF	PA	PP	Pts
1	UWS Giants	18	15	3	0	2020	1097	184.1	60
2	Sydney	18	15	3	0	1664	1006	165.4	60
3	Northern Territory	18	15	3	0	1810	1397	129.6	60
4	Aspley (P)	18	13	5	0	1876	1117	167.9	52
5	Redland	18	13	5	0	1815	1438	126.2	52
6	Ainslie	18	12	6	0	1738	1353	128.5	48
7	Sydney University	18	10	8	0	1518	1495	101.5	40
8	Southport	18	8	10	0	1573	1266	124.2	32
9	Brisbane Lions	18	6	12	0	1432	1652	86.7	24
10	Sydney Hills	18	6	12	0	1371	1695	80.9	24
11	Belconnen	18	6	12	0	1279	1742	73.4	24
12	Queanbeyan	18	4	14	0	1329	1932	68.8	16
13	Eastlake	18	3	15	0	999	1931	51.7	12
14	Gold Coast Suns	18	0	18	0	954	2257	42.3	0

Source: Source
Rules for classification: 1) points; 2) percentage; 3) number of points for.
(P) Premiers

== Finals series ==
Elimination finals
Aspley	12.15 (87)
Redland	9.10 (64)
NT Thunder	7.11 (53)
Ainslie	5.6 (36)

Preliminary finals
UWS Giants	10.7 (67)
Aspley	16.16 (112)
Sydney	16.11 (107)
NT Thunder	6.9 (45)

Grand Final
Aspley	15.12 (102)
Sydney	15.10 (100)

=== Elimination finals ===
	Elimination finals
Saturday 30 August (1:30 pm)	Aspley 12.15 (87)	def.	Redland 9.10 (64)	Graham Road Oval	Report
Saturday 30 August (7:00 pm)	NT Thunder 7.11 (53)	def.	Ainslie 5.6 (36)	TIO Stadium	Report
The NEAFL executive announced the schedule of the finals series at the conclusion of the home and away season.

=== Preliminary finals ===
	Preliminary finals
Saturday 6 September (3:15 pm)	UWS Giants 10.7 (67)	def. by	Aspley 16.16 (112)	Blacktown ISP Oval	Report
Sunday 7 September (12:45 pm)	Sydney 16.11 (107)	def.	NT Thunder 6.9 (45)	Blacktown ISP Oval	Report

=== Grand Final ===
2014 NEAFL Grand Final
Saturday 13 September (1:30 pm)	Aspley	def.	Sydney	Graham Road Oval	Report
3.3 (21); 9.4 (58); 9.7 (61); 15.12 (102)	Q1; Q2; Q3; Final	3.5 (23); 7.7 (49); 14.8 (92); 15.10 (100)	Andrew Ireland Medal: Tom Mitchell (Sydney)
3: French, Smith; 1: Joyce, Turner, Sansbury, Dawson, Toye, Holman, Williams, Wagner, Payne	Goals	5: Membrey; 2: Towers; 1: Hiscox, Wright, Jones, Mills, Naismith, Mitchell, O'Keefe, Jack
Matthews, Wagner, Smith, Thomson, Lucy, Holman	Best	Mitchell, Membrey, Richards, Towers, Biggs, O'Keefe
This match was the first ever between these two teams in the NEAFL

== Foxtel Cup ==
Two NEAFL clubs, Aspley and Belconnen, were invited to compete in the Foxtel Cup knockout competition for season 2014. Both teams were knocked out in the Qualifying/First Round stage of the competition. Their results are shown below:

Qualifier 29 March 2014; 12:00 EST	Aspley	173 - 17 stand alone game	Belconnen	Graham Road, Aspley match report
	7.3 (45); 9.9 (63); 20.14 (134); 25.23 (173)	match report	0.1 (1); 2.2 (14); 2.2 (14); 2.5 (17)
		Goals
	E.Sansbury 6, J.Stanley 3, C.Stiller 3, C.French 2, D.Smith 2, M.Pettitt 2, R.Copeland, M.Payne, M.Hutchinson, D.Bevan, A.Hughes, R.Matthews, J.Ives		M.Porter, M. Sharp
		Bests
	M.Payne, E.Sansbury, J.Stanley, R.Copeland, A.Lucy, J.Turner		D.Hector, R.Turnbull, C.York, M.Sharp

Game #3 20 May 2014; 20:35 EST	Williamstown	93 - 48 stand alone game	Aspley	MCG match report match statistics
	4.1 (25); 5.4 (34); 9.7 (61); 14.9 (93)	match report	1.2 (8); 4.3 (27); 5.5 (35); 7.6 (48)
		Goals
	A.Marcon 3, J.Owen 3, S.Clouston 2, D.Conway 2, J.Johnstone, M.Gibbons, S.Tighe, C.Nastasi		A.Hughes 2, J.Nelis, J.Williams, R.Matthews, C.French, M.Payne.
		Bests
	A.Marcon, S.Tighe, N.Sing, J.Johnstone, M.Gibbons.		R.Matthews, M.Payne, J.Williams, R.Copeland, A.Lucy.

== State games ==
The top-level players from the NEAFL partook in two state games in season 2014, one against the West Australian Football League representative team on 24 May and another against the Tasmanian State League representative team on 21 June.

	2014 State Game
Saturday 24 May (12:00 pm)	NEAFL 6.11 (47)	def. by	WAFL 19.18 (132)	Blacktown ISP Oval, Sydney (crowd: 500)	Report
Simpson Medal (WAFL): Ashton Hams

	2014 State Game
Saturday 21 June (2:00 pm)	TSL 18.12 (120)	def.	NEAFL 12.7 (79)	Blundstone Arena
Lefroy Medal (TSL): Jason Laycock (Match Report)

== Awards ==
- The League MVP Award was awarded to Matthew Payne of Aspley, who polled 102 votes.
- The NEAFL Rising Star was awarded to Paul Hunter of Redland.
- The NEAFL leading goalkicker award was awarded to Cleve Hughes of Redland.
- The NEAFL coach of the year was awarded to Xavier Clarke of NT Thunder.
- The NEAFL goal of the year was awarded to Jordan Harper of Belconnen, for his goal during round 1.
- The NEAFL mark of the year was awarded to Kelvin Barnes of Sydney University, for his mark during round 7.

=== Team of the Year ===
2014 NEAFL Team of the Year
B:	Matthew O’Dwyer (Sydney University)	Timothy Barton (Sydney University)	Shane Biggs (Sydney)
HB:	Kade Klemke (Queanbeyan)	Wayde Mills (Southport)	Will Sierakowski (Sydney University)
C:	Zac O'Brien (Brisbane)	Matthew Payne (Aspley)	Blake Grewar (Redland)
HF:	Chris Dunne (NT Thunder)	Nick Salter (Ainslie)	Cameron Ilett (NT Thunder) (C)
F:	Eddie Sansbury (Aspley)	Darren Ewing (NT Thunder)	Cleve Hughes (Redland)
Foll:	Paul Hunter (Redland)	Aaron vandenBerg (Ainslie)	Mark Whiley (UWS Giants)
Int:	Daniel Robinson (Sydney)	Jason Burge (Southport)	Jordan Harper (Belconnen)
Int:	Matthew Buntine (UWS Giants)		
Coach:	Xavier Clarke (NT Thunder)		

=== Best and fairest winners ===
Club	Award name	Player	Ref.
Ainslie	Hibberson Cup Trophy	Aaron vandenBerg	
Aspley	Carl Herbert Medal	Matt Payne	
Belconnen			
Eastlake	Best and Fairest	Kirk Mahon	
NT Thunder	Club Champion	Cameron Ilett	
Queanbeyan			
Redland	Dowling Medal	Paul Hunter	
Southport	Doc Mackenzie Medal	Wayde Mills	
Sydney Hills			
Sydney University	Driscoll Medal	Jake Derickx	
Sydney University	Driscoll Medal	Tim Barton	

== AFL draftees ==
Draft pick	Player	Club	Drafted to
10_{N}	Nakia Cockatoo	NT Thunder	Geelong
13_{N}	Lachie Weller	Southport	Fremantle
24_{N}	Jack Steele	Belconnen	Greater Western Sydney
38_{N}	Jack Hiscox	Sydney University	Sydney
44_{N}	Liam Dawson	Aspley	Brisbane Lions
61_{N}	Harris Andrews	Aspley	Brisbane Lions
69_{N}	Logan Austin	Belconnen	Port Adelaide
85_{N}	Jeremy Finlayson	Sydney Hills	Greater Western Sydney
2_{R}	Aaron vandenBerg	Ainslie	Melbourne

N – national draft
R – rookie draft
