= Caiden Cleary =

Australian rules footballer (born 2005)

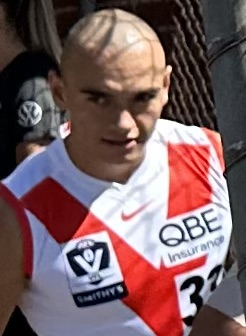
- Cleary in April 2026

Personal information
- Born: 5 March 2005 (age 21)
- Original teams: Sydney University; Newtown Swans; Sydney Swans Academy
- Draft: No. 24, 2023 AFL draft
- Debut: 22 June 2024, Sydney vs. Greater Western Sydney, at Sydney Showground
- Height: 182 cm (6 ft 0 in)
- Weight: 79 kg (174 lb)

Club information
- Current club: Sydney
- Number: 33

Playing career^{1}
Years	Club	Games (Goals)
2024–	Sydney	25 (5)
- ^{1} Playing statistics correct to the end of round 22, 2026.

Caiden Cleary (born 5 March 2005) is an Australian rules footballer who plays for the Sydney Swans in the Australian Football League (AFL).

Cleary went through the Sydney Swans Academy side and was taken by Sydney with pick 24 of the 2023 National Draft after they matched a bid from Collingwood. He made his debut against Greater Western Sydney, coming on as the substitute in the last quarter in round 15 of the 2024 season. He scored a goal with his first kick.

== 2025 drug suspension ==
Caiden Cleary was suspended for the first two rounds of the 2025 AFL season after being found guilty of 'conduct unbecoming' following an attempt to purchase an illicit substance in Sydney’s eastern suburbs. Cleary, who received a $400 fine from NSW Police without a criminal conviction, was also fined $5,000 under the AFL’s Illicit Drugs Policy, with the fine suspended pending good behaviour. The Sydney Swans expressed disappointment over Cleary’s actions, noting his failure to notify the club, but acknowledged his remorse and cooperation with the investigation.

== Statistics ==
Updated to the end of round 22, 2026.

Legend
G	Goals	K	Kicks	D	Disposals	T	Tackles
B	Behinds	H	Handballs	M	Marks

Season	Team	No.	Games	Totals							Averages (per game)							Votes
Season	Team	No.	Games	G	B	K	H	D	M	T	G	B	K	H	D	M	T	Votes
2024	Sydney	33	5	2	2	18	15	33	5	6	0.4	0.4	3.6	3.0	6.6	1.0	1.2	0
2025	Sydney	33	12	1	8	48	84	132	30	39	0.1	0.7	4.0	7.0	11.0	2.5	3.3	0
2026	Sydney	33	8	2	8	34	67	101	19	24	0.3	1.0	4.3	8.4	12.6	2.4	3.0	0
Career			25	5	18	100	166	266	54	69	0.2	0.7	4.0	6.6	10.6	2.2	2.8	0
