= Jack Esplen Oval =

Australian rules football venue in Brisbane, Queensland

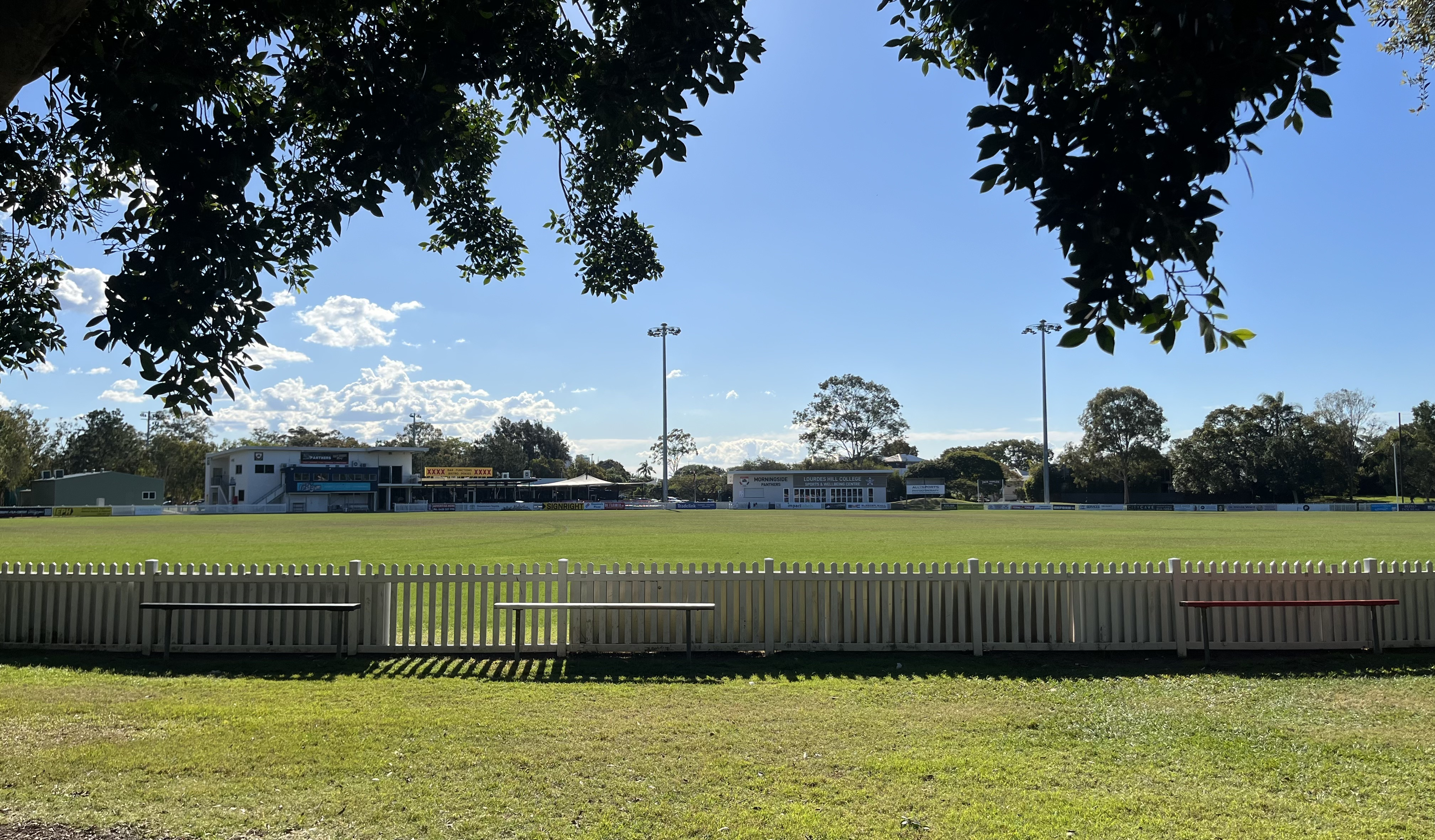
- Jack Esplen Oval in August 2026
- Interactive map of Jack Esplen Oval
- Address: 249 Hawthorne Rd; Hawthorne, Queensland
- Coordinates: 27.463746°S 153.062785°E
- Field size: 157 m × 132 m (515 ft × 433 ft)

Tenant
- Morningside Australian Football Club

Jack Esplen Oval is an Australian rules football venue located in the Brisbane suburb of Hawthorne. It is the home ground of the Morningside Australian Football Club in the Queensland Australian Football League (QAFL).

The ground is located in (and is sometimes also referred to as) Hawthorne Park. The venue's clubhouse building includes a restaurant called the "Fifth Qtr Bistro". It currently has limited spectator facilities and no grandstands.

== History ==
It is unknown when the ground opened, however the Morningside Australian Football Club have played at the ground since the clubs was formed in 1950.

Morningside joined the North East Australian Football League (NEAFL) for the league's inaugural season in 2011. The first NEAFL match at Jack Esplen Oval was held on 3 April 2011, with Morningside defeating Brisbane by seven points. Two NEAFL elimination finals – one in 2011 and the other in 2013 – were played at the venue. Morningside left the NEAFL at the end of the 2013 season, although one match between Redland and Greater Western Sydney was played at the venue in 2019 as a double-header to a QAFL match featuring Morningside and Mount Gravatt. Overall, thirty NEAFL matches were held at Jack Esplen Oval.

In August 2017, the ground received an A$800,000 upgrade for new facilities, which were aimed at increasing female sports participation. The upgrades were jointly funded by the Turnbull federal government, the Palaszczuk state government, Brisbane City Council, AFL Queensland and the club itself. The club was the subject of legal action from Brisbane City Council in January 2018 over unapproved trenching work following the 2017 renovations, which caused damage to over thirty trees. Further upgrades at the venue have since taken place, including a new shed that began construction in late 2022 and was opened in July 2023.

The venue is named after Jack Esplen (1919 or 1920 – 2018), who was a key figure in the amalgamation of the Morningside and Hawthorne football clubs in 1950 and was later heavily involved in junior football recruiting until his retirement in the late 1980s. He remained an active member of the club in his retirement, attending at least two matches per season until his death in 2018.
