= Cooke Murphy Oval =

Sports venue in Labrador, Queensland

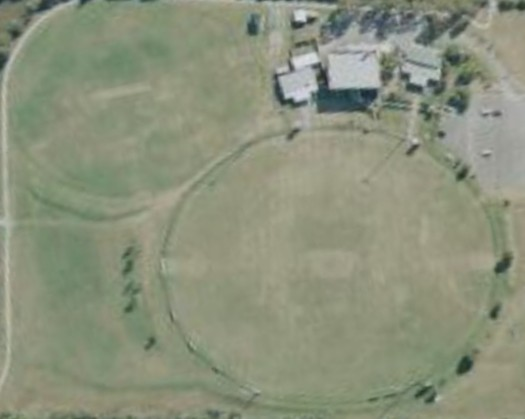
- Interactive map of Cooke Murphy Oval
- Address: 9-13 Olsen Ave; Labrador, Queensland
- Coordinates: 27.937621473687823°S 153.39675064417884°E
- Owner: Gold Coast City Council
- Capacity: 8,000
- Field size: 167 m × 136 m (548 ft × 446 ft)

Construction
- Opened: c. 1931; 95 years ago

Tenant
- Labrador Football Club (QAFL)

Cooke Murphy Oval (sometimes stylised Cooke-Murphy Oval) is an Australian rules football and cricket venue in the Gold Coast suburb of Labrador, Queensland. It is the home ground of the Labrador Tigers in the Queensland Australian Football League (QAFL).

== History ==
The Labrador Sports Reserve (also known as the Labrador Sports Ground) was established in the early 1930s, with a tennis court built in 1932 and a cricket pitch constructed shortly after.

When the Gold Coast Australian Football League (GCAFL) was formed in 1961, the first match of the new competition was held at Labrador Sports Reserve between Southport and Central in front of a crowd of 1,000 people. Two floodlights were installed at the ground later that year. The Labrador Australian Football Club entered the GCAFL in 1964 and began playing its home matches at the ground.

By 1992, the ground had been renamed to Cooke Murphy Oval.

In 2010, the Gold Coast Football Club entered the Victorian Football League (VFL) as a senior team, prior to joining the Australian Football League (AFL) the following year. One VFL match was played at Cooke Murphy Oval on 24 July 2010, when Gold Coast defeated Sandringham by 26 points. Another match had been scheduled to be played at the venue against Casey on 1 May 2010, but it was relocated to Fankhauser Reserve because the condition of the ground was deemed unsuitable for the VFL following heavy rain.

Lighting at the ground was upgraded in 2021 at a cost of A$477,000.
