= Sydney University Australian National Football Club =

Sydney University

Names
- Full name: Sydney University Australian National Football Club
- Nickname: The Students

AFL Sydney Premier Division 2025 season
- After finals: Men's: 5th (Elimination); Women's: 2nd (Grand Finalist)
- Home-and-away season: Men's: 4th Women's: 3rd

Club details
- Founded: 1887; 139 years ago
- Colours: Gold and Navy Blue
- Competition: AFL Sydney
- President: Lindsay Scown
- Coach: MPD: Kyle Underwood; WPD: Jon Dyster
- Captain(s): MPD: Nathan Tang; WPD: Maryanne Harley
- Premierships: AFL Sydney (2); 1992, 2020
- Ground: Oval No. 1, University of Sydney, Camperdown

Uniforms
Home

Other information
- Official website: suanfc.com

The Sydney University Australian National Football Club (SUANFC) is the oldest Australian rules football club in New South Wales, founded in 1887. This claim is based on the club being a spin-off from Sydney University Football Club, Australia's oldest rugby union club, which experimented with Australian rules in its early years. SUANFC did not play its first official game until 1887.

== History ==
=== 19th century ===
In July 1887 the 'Sydney University Australian Association Club' was founded by students to play games under Australian rules. The formation was encouraged by a letter of support from the Melbourne University FC. The new club joined the 1880-founded NSW Football Association (NSWFA). Formed late in the 1887 season, only three games were played by University that first year. The following winter saw a full fixture list, including a visit to Melbourne to play Melbourne University FC in the first inter-varsity game in any football code in Australia held on 3 September 1888. The promise of a return visit from Melbourne University FC to Sydney in 1889 failed to materialise and the Sydney University club played its final matches in late July 1889 against St Joseph's College and Saint Ignatius' College.

A decade earlier in 1877 the undergraduates at the Sydney University FC (rugby rules club) had been advocating for the Southern Rugby Football Union (now NSWRU) and its member clubs to change their rules and in effect to switch codes to Australian rules.The following season in 1878 the University club negotiated with the Melbourne FC for a visit (which did not proceed) to Sydney to play Victorian rules games. The University club's continued agitation aided momentum towards establishing in 1880 the Australian code in Sydney under the NSWFA.

While the Sydney University FC (rugby rules club) claims it was founded in 1863 and that it is the birthplace of the rugby code in Australia, none of the contemporary newspaper reports confirm any of the University team's games at this time were under rugby rules, and the few rival football clubs that existed in Sydney prior to 1870 are all documented as having adopted Victorian rules or a local modified version of it.

=== 20th century ===
The modern iteration of the SUANFC was founded in 1948. The Students have participated in Sydney football's elite competition for a total of 41 seasons (as at the end of 2023) in four separate stints. In the 10 seasons from 1948 to 1957, the side managed four "wooden spoons" and two second last finishes, with seventh place out of 10 clubs in 1954 .

The next stint in the top flight was between 1962 and 1968, and then reserve grade only in 1969-70. Then there was involvement in the Sydney District Football Association (the word "District" was later dropped from the title) between 1971 and 1987. In the competition's inaugural season, the side contested an "all student" grand final against the University of New South Wales, but despite managing the same number of scoring shots as the opposition, they went under by 25 points. Another grand final appearance against the same adversaries in 1977 brought a similar result.

Sydney University's first SFA premiership arrived in 1981 after a 10.14 (74) to 9.12 (68) grand final defeat of St Ives, but the following year brought disappointment with a 42-point defeat at the hands of the same opponents.

After consecutive flags in 1986 (a 16-point defeat of Manly-Warringah) and 1987 (by 62 points over Bankstown Sports) the side was ready for a 3rd stint at the SFL. After a wooden spoon in 1988, the students began to make steady progress.

By 1992, under the expert guidance of former Sydney Swans stalwart Rod Carter, the Students were ready to take a serious tilt at the flag, and after finishing as minor premiers they qualified to meet reigning premiers North Shore in the premiership decider and won by 65 points. Final scores were Sydney University 18.16 (124) to North Shore 8.11 (59. After dropping to 5th in 1993, the side moved to 8th position (out of 10) in 1994, before returning to the SFA. After taking a couple of season to find their feet, the Students contested every grand final bar one between 1997 and 2001, although they were only ultimately able to secure 2 premierships.

=== 21st century ===
Concurrently, the Sydney University Women’s AFL Club, one of the inaugural clubs of the Sydney Women’s Australian Football League, was established in 2000. Named ‘The Bombers', the women’s side achieved immediate success, capturing premierships in 2001 and 2007.

The 2010s saw The Bombers dominate the league, winning premierships in 2013 and 2014. This successful period was complemented by the rise of future stars like Stephanie Walker and Nicola Barr, who won the AFL Sydney Women’s Rising Star awards and later the Mostyn Medals. Moreover, Barr, Walker, Erin McKinnon, and Isabella Rudolph were drafted to the GWS Giants in the inaugural AFLW draft in 2016, with Barr being the first overall pick.

In 2007, the Students were re-admitted to the top flight of the Sydney AFL after an absence of 12 years. Under coach Daniel Archer, the club finished with a respectable five wins to finish in eighth spot on the ladder. The club was to take bigger strides in 2008, just missing out on a finals berth on the last day of the season after a loss to North Shore.

The 2009 season saw a change of coach – Roger Moten who had coached local rival UTS to premiership success was installed, as was a new captain in Mark Egan. Again, the Students fell agonisingly short of a finals berth after a string of close losses throughout the season, however there was success at an individual level for two players with Tom Young winning the Sydney AFL Rising Star award and Brydon Coles taking home the coveted Phelan Medal for the Best & Fairest player in the Sydney AFL Premier Division.

In 2010 the Students showed they belonged amongst the elite clubs in the Sydney AFL, taking out the minor premiership following a 14-game winning streak to end the home and away rounds. The club qualified for its maiden Sydney AFL Premier Division Grand Final since re-entry into the top flight with a hard-fought win against Western Suburbs. The club was experiencing its best season of the modern era, with its Division 1 and Colts sides also qualifying for the Grand Final, along with multiple individual award winners at the annual Sydney AFL awards night. Alex Lee took out the Phelan Medal, finishing 2nd in the vote tally but winning on default due to Damien Bowles from East Coast Eagles who accumulated more votes but was ruled ineligible due to a suspension through the year. This marked the first time in history an SUANFC player claimed the award two years in a row, whilst Tim Air collected the Snow Medal (awarded to Best and Fairest in Division 1) and Monty Krochmal was awarded the Kealy Medal (for U18 Premier Division B&F). Roger Moten was named Sydney AFL Coach of the Year for his achievements. The Students were defeated on Grand Final day in both Premier Division and Division 1 by East Coast and UTS respectively, however the Colts were able to hoist the trophy in the Under 18s with a thrilling victory over their East Coast counterparts.

2011 saw Uni consolidate on their performances of the previous year, with the Senior team falling one game short of qualifying for a second consecutive Grand Final. However, the season was a success across all grades with all six teams at the club qualifying for finals action. Another highlight for the year was former Uni star Tom Young being selected to make his debut for Collingwood, thereby becoming the first Sydney University player to reach the AFL.

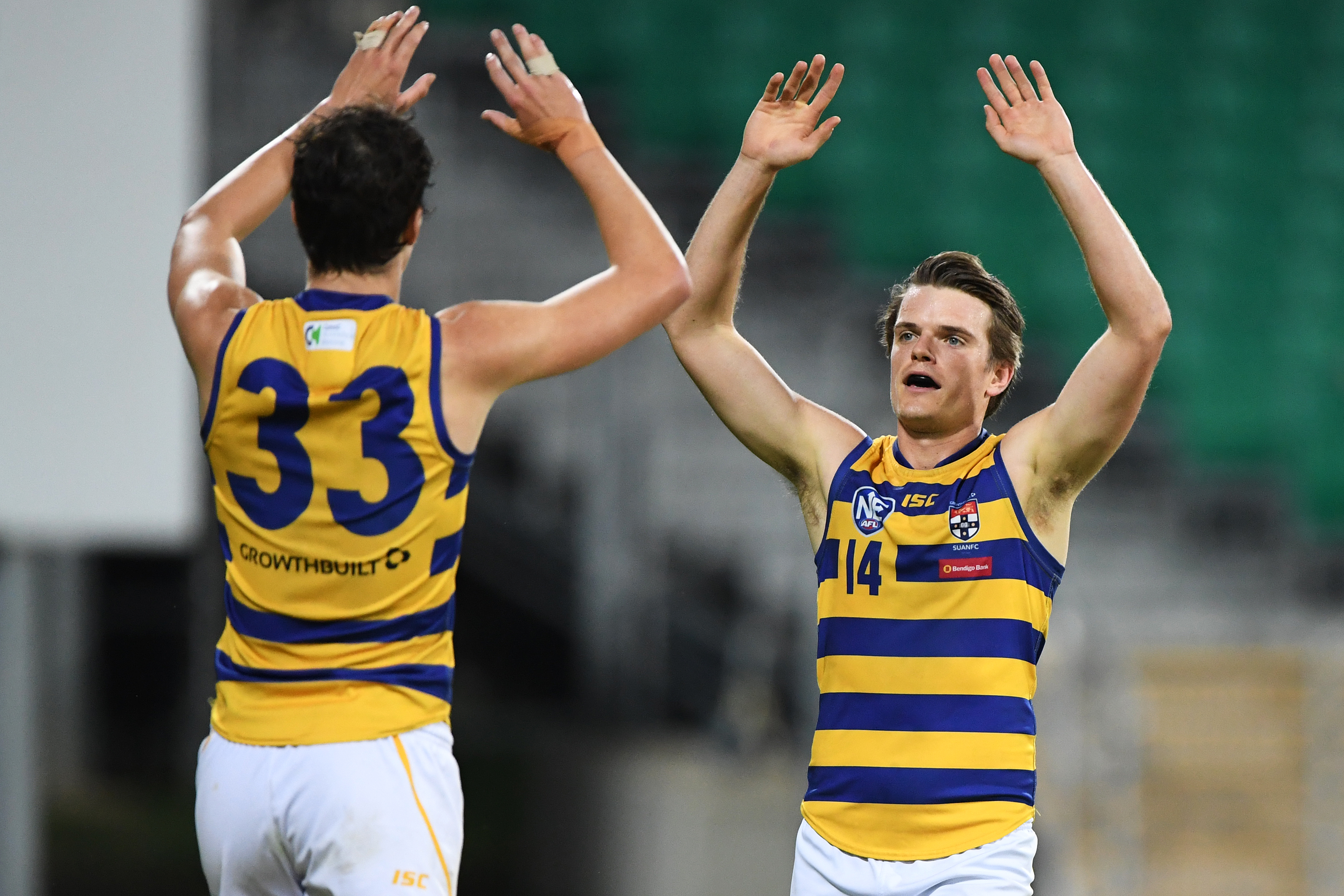
Tom Banuelos and Montgomery Krochmal of Sydney University celebrate a goal during the 2019 NEAFL round 19

In 2012, SUANFC elevated its standing through its participation in the North East Australian Football League (NEAFL). This expanded the club’s horizons, pitting them against top-tier teams across the eastern seaboard. Roger Moten, appointed as the inaugural NEAFL Senior Coach in 2012, played a vital role in refining the club’s football program. Subsequent years were marked by steady progress under Tom Morrison, making the finals for five consecutive years.

The club chose not to participate in the VFL following the dissolution of the NEAFL due to the COVID-19 pandemic in early 2020. Instead, it returned to the AFL Sydney Premier Division and secured another first grade premiership in 2020, with Jake Bartholomaeus earning the Phelan Medal and Tim Barton winning the Rod Podbury medal for best on ground in the grand final win. Another watershed moment that season was the merging of the men’s and women’s clubs under a unified constitution.

Since 2022, SUANFC's men’s and women’s Premier Division teams have regularly played in finals. The U19s Division One side won back-to-back premierships in 2022 and 2023 and reached the grand final again in 2024 and 2025. In 2023, Maryanne Harley won the Mostyn Medal, and in 2025 she co-captained the women’s Premier Division team alongside Jon Dyster to an AFL Sydney grand final.

As of 2026, SUANFC has grown to 12 teams, seven men’s and five women’s, with a playing group of over 350, making it one of the largest and most successful community football clubs in Sydney. In 2027 the club will compete alongside eight other AFL Syndey Premier Division teams in the Sydney Football League.

== Home Ground ==
The club’s storied history is indelibly linked to the Sydney University Oval No.1, a ground which was constructed in 1854. The grandstand, erected in 1885, serves as a lasting monument to the club’s evolution and rich sporting history.

== League Affiliations ==
Men's Program: NSWANFL (1948–57 & 1962–68); SFA (1971–87); SFL (1988–94); SFA (1995–2006); SFL (2007–2008); AFL Sydney (2009-present); NEAFL (2012-2019)

Women's Program: SWAFL (2000-2008); AFL Sydney (2009-present)

== Notable Achievements ==
First Grade Men's Premierships: AFL Sydney (2020); SFL (1992); SFA (1981, 1986, 1987, 1997, 2003, 2005)

First Grade Women's Premierships: AFL Sydney (2013, 2014); SWAFL (2001, 2007)

Phelan Medallists: Geoff Davidson (1953); Michael Davis (1990); Brydon Coles (2009); Alex Lee (2010); Jake Bartholomaeus (2020)

Mostyn Medallists: Stephanie Walker (2014); Nicola Barr (2016); Maryanne Harley (2023)

Rod Podbury Medallists: Matthew Lloyd (1992); Timothy Barton (2020)

Deborah Rogers Memorial Trophy Winners: Jennifer Lew (2013); Rachael Stack (2014)

Snow Medallists: Peter Sadler (1971); Peter Moggarch (1979); Tim Driscoll (1987); Tim Air (2010); Ryan Kennedy (2017); Matthew Powys (2022)

AFL Sydney Men's Rising Star Award: Tom Young (2009); Harry Dobson (2014); Sam Gilfedder (2018)

AFL Sydney Women's Rising Star Award: Stephanie Walker (2013); Nicola Barr (2015)

NEAFL MVP: Tom Young (2015); Jake Bartholomaeus (2019)

AFL Draftees: Tom Young (2010); Jarrod Witts (2011); Michael Hartley (2011); Craig Moller (2012); Jack Hiscox (2014); Caiden Cleary (2023)

AFLW Draftees: Nicola Barr (2016); Erin McKinnon (2016); Stephanie Walker (2016); Isabella Rudolph (2016)

== See also ==
- AFL Sydney
- Melbourne University Football Club
- Adelaide University Football Club
- University of Queensland Australian Football Club
