= University Oval, Sydney =

Sports ground in Sydney, Australia

Coordinates: 33°53′16″S 151°11′06″E

University Oval
- Interactive map of University Oval

Ground information
- Location: Sydney
- Country: Australia

International information
- Only women's Test: 12 January 1979: Australia v New Zealand
- As of 24 November 2009; Source: CricketArchive

University Oval is a cricket ground at the University of Sydney, in Sydney, Australia. The first recorded match on the ground was in 1898, when it was the venue for a game between the Australian Universities and A. E. Stoddart's XI. The ground has also hosted a Women's Test match between Australia and New Zealand.
