= Bruce Purser Reserve =

Sporting complex in Sydney, Australia

Coordinates: 33.685074°S 150.931907°E

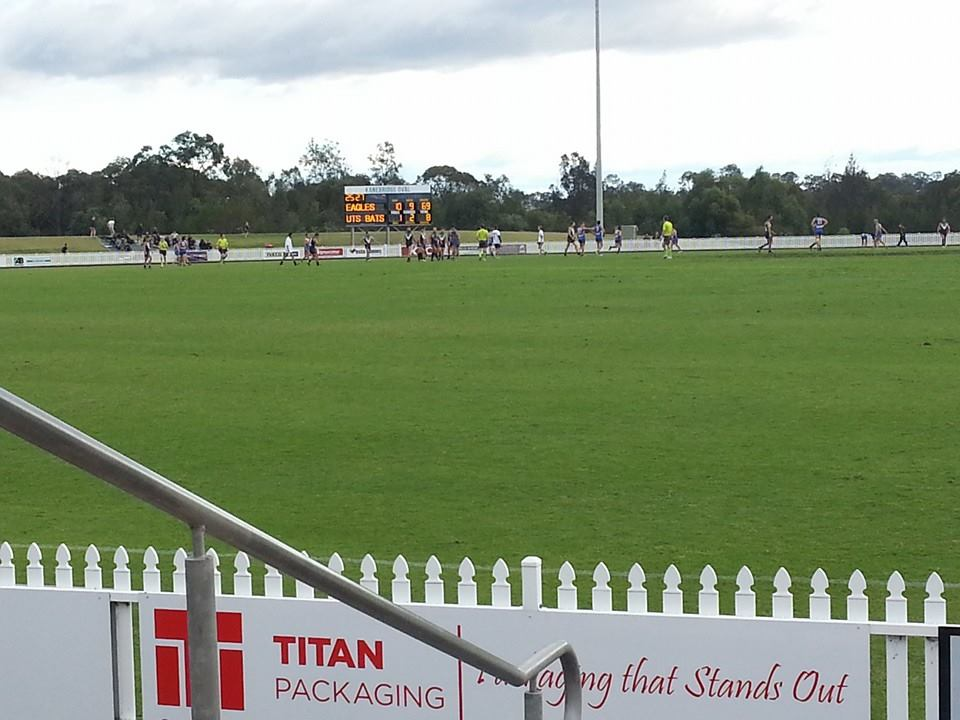
- 2015 AFL Sydney match at Bruce Purser Reserve
- Interactive map of Bruce Purser Reserve
- Address: Withers Rd & Commercial Rd
- Location: Rouse Hill
- Record attendance: 3,600

Construction
- Opened: 7 March 2009

Tenants
- AFL Sydney & Sydney Football League East Coast Eagles (2008 - Present)

Bruce Purser Reserve, formerly known by naming rights sponsorship as Kanebridge Oval, is a sports facility in Rouse Hill, an outer suburb of Sydney, Australia.

It was constructed between 2007 and 2008 on the site of a former rubbish tip, at the corner of Commercial Road and Withers Road. Its main feature is a grassed oval constructed to competition standards for Australian football and cricket. This is supplemented by practice pitches for cricket, an amenities building with changing rooms and a canteen, plus picnic areas and car parking. The ground is floodlit, enabling the playing of night matches.

== History ==
In 2007 the then under construction ground, known then as the Withers Road complex, was given the name Bruce Purser. Bruce Purser was the first chairman of the Hills Shire. The AFL Sydney club East Coast Eagles were given permission to obtain naming rights for the oval. Construction was completed as the ground handed over to the East Coast Eagles in December 2008. It remains the home ground of the Eagles.

The first major event at the Reserve was an Australian Football League pre-season competition match between the Sydney Swans and the Western Bulldogs on 7 March 2009. The game drew a crowd of 3,600. The ground was officially opened in a ceremony at half-time during that game by Hills Shire mayor Tony Hay. The Swans played North Melbourne in a NAB Cup match at Bruce Purser Reserve in 2012, which drew a crowd of 2,024.
