= Labrador Australian Football Club =

Labrador

Names
- Full name: Labrador Australian Football Club
- Nickname: Tigers

2026 QAFL season
- After finals: 6th (Semi-final)
- Home-and-away season: 6th

Club details
- Founded: 1963; 63 years ago
- Colours
- Competition: QAFL
- President: Luke Black
- Coach: Clint Watts
- Captain: Bryce Retzlaff
- Premierships: QAFL: 2 (2015, 2016)
- Ground: Cooke-Murphy Oval

Uniforms
Home

Other information
- Official website: labradortigers.com.au

Labrador Australian Football Club, also known as the Labrador Tigers, is a Gold Coast based sports club. Labrador's Australian rules football team currently competes in the Queensland Australian Football League. From 2011 to 2014 it was an inaugural member club of the NEAFL competition.

Formed in 1963 the Tigers played in the Gold Coast AFL until they were promoted into the Queensland State League in 1997. Runners-up in 2010 the club is a founding member of the NEAFL.

== Premierships (7) ==
No.	Year	Competition	Opponent	Score	Venue
1	1970	GCAFL	Surfers Paradise Demons	15.13 (103) – 13.14 (92)	Owen Park
2	1986	GCAFL	Palm Beach Currumbin	15.13 (103) – 13.14 (92)	Labrador Sports Ground
3	1991	GCAFL	Palm Beach Currumbin	15.16 (106) – 6.8 (44)	Merrimac Oval
4	1993	GCAFL	Surfers Paradise Demons	15.10 (100) – 14.10 (94)	Labrador Sports Ground
5	1994	GCAFL	Palm Beach Currumbin	14.14 (96) – 10.11 (71)	Small Park
6	2015	QAFL	Morningside Panthers	14.12 (96) – 13.11 (89)	Leyshon Park
7	2016	QAFL	Palm Beach Currumbin	15.12 (102) – 7.7 (49)	Leyshon Park

== Club song ==
The Labrador Tigers have the same club song as that of the Richmond Tigers based on "Row, Row, Row From Ziegfeld Follies".

== Players in the AFL Draft ==
Year	Name	Team	Draft No.
2001	Michael Osborne	Hawthorn	11th (rookie)
2009	Daniel Stewart	Port Adelaide	82nd
2009	Bryce Retzlaff	Brisbane Lions	84th
2010	Claye Beams	Brisbane Lions	76th (rookie)
2011	Stephen Wrigley	Brisbane Lions	22nd (rookie)
2013	Fraser Thurlow	Essendon	9th (rookie)
2019	Connor Budarick	Gold Coast	16th (rookie)
2019	Patrick Murtagh	Gold Coast	Academy selection (rookie)
2020	Rhys Nicholls	Gold Coast	40th (rookie)

== AFL players ==
There is a list of Labrador players who have played at AFL:

- Claye Beams (Brisbane Lions)
- Andrew Boston (Gold Coast Suns)
- Charlie Dixon (Gold Coast Suns and Port Adelaide Power)
- Jordan Doering (Carlton Blues)
- Cameron Ellis-Yolmen (Adelaide Crows and Brisbane Lions)
- Peter Everitt (Hawthorn Hawks, St Kilda Saints and Sydney Swans)
- Tom Fields (Carlton Blues)
- Ben Fixter (Sydney Swans and Brisbane Lions)
- Josh Fraser (Collingwood Magpies and Gold Coast Suns)
- Barry Hall (St Kilda Saints, Sydney Swans and Western Bulldogs)
- Pearce Hanley (Brisbane Lions and Gold Coast Suns)
- Lachie Henderson (Brisbane Lions, Carlton Blues and Geelong Cats)
- Trent Knobel (Brisbane Lions, St Kilda Saints and Richmond Tigers)
- Matthew Lappin (Carlton Blues and St Kilda Saints)
- Wayde Mills (Brisbane Lions)
- Tim Notting (Brisbane Lions)
- Michael Osborne (Hawthorn Hawks)
- Bryce Retzlaff (Brisbane Lions)
- Aaron Shattock (Brisbane Lions and Port Adelaide Power)
- Daniel Stewart (Port Adelaide Power)
- Stephen Wrigley (Brisbane Lions)
- Connor Budarick (Gold Coast and Western Bulldogs)
