= Blacktown ISP Oval =

Sports ground in Sydney, Australia

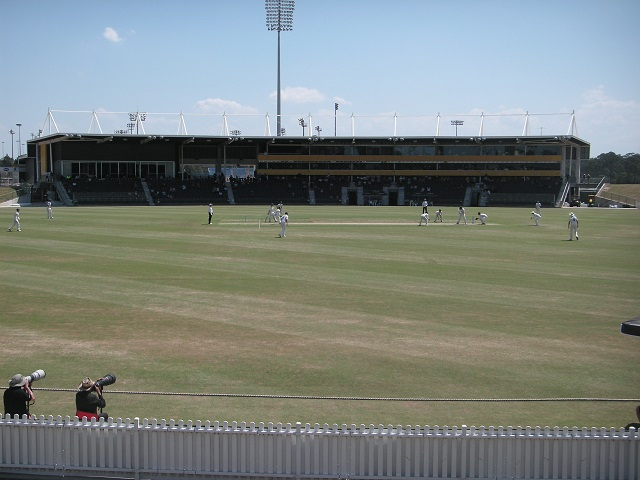
- Cricket at Blacktown ISP Oval in 2013
- Interactive map of Blacktown ISP Oval
- Address: Eastern Road; Rooty Hill, New South Wales
- Coordinates: 33°46′10″S 150°51′33″E
- Operator: Blacktown Venue Management
- Capacity: 10,000 (2,500 seated)
- Record attendance: 9,447 (NAB Cup Pool 5 matches, 19 February 2011)

Construction
- Opened: 2009; 17 years ago

Tenants
- Greater Western Sydney Giants: Reserves (NEAFL/VFL) (2012–2025); Training/administrative (2009–2013); AFL Women's (2017–2023)

Blacktown International Sportspark Oval (known simply as Blacktown ISP Oval) is an Australian rules football and cricket venue located in the Sydney suburb of Rooty Hill. It was constructed in 2009 as part of the Blacktown International Sportspark.

== History ==
Blacktown ISP Oval was the original main training facility for the Greater Western Sydney Giants (GWS) after the club was formed in 2009. Home matches were played in Blacktown when the club competed in the TAC Cup in 2010 and the North East Australian Football League (NEAFL) in 2011.

A record crowd of 9,447 people attended the venue for the Pool 5 matches between GWS, Gold Coast and Sydney during the 2011 NAB Cup. It was also the primary venue for the Australian Football International Cup in August 2011.

One Australian Football League (AFL) match was played at the ground against West Coast during the Giants' inaugural AFL season in 2012, prior to the redevelopment of Sydney Showground Stadium.

In 2014, GWS moved its training base to Tom Wills Oval in Sydney Olympic Park. NEAFL and AFL pre-season practice matches continued to be played at Blacktown ISP Oval, including the 2016 NEAFL grand final.

GWS entered the AFL Women's (AFLW) competition for its inaugural season in 2017, playing its first home match at Blacktown ISP Oval in round 3 in front of a crowd of 4,000 people. AFLW matches were played in Blacktown until the 2024 season, when GWS moved its Sydney-based home matches to Henson Park.

Following the disbandment of the NEAFL in 2020, the Giants' reserves team moved to the Victorian Football League (VFL). They continued playing at Blacktown ISP Oval until the 2026 season, when all home matches were scheduled to take place at Tom Wills Oval.
