= Margaret Donoghoe Sportsground =

Sports facility in Queanbeyan, New South Wales, Australia

Coordinates: 35°22′12″S 149°13′48″E

Aulich Park
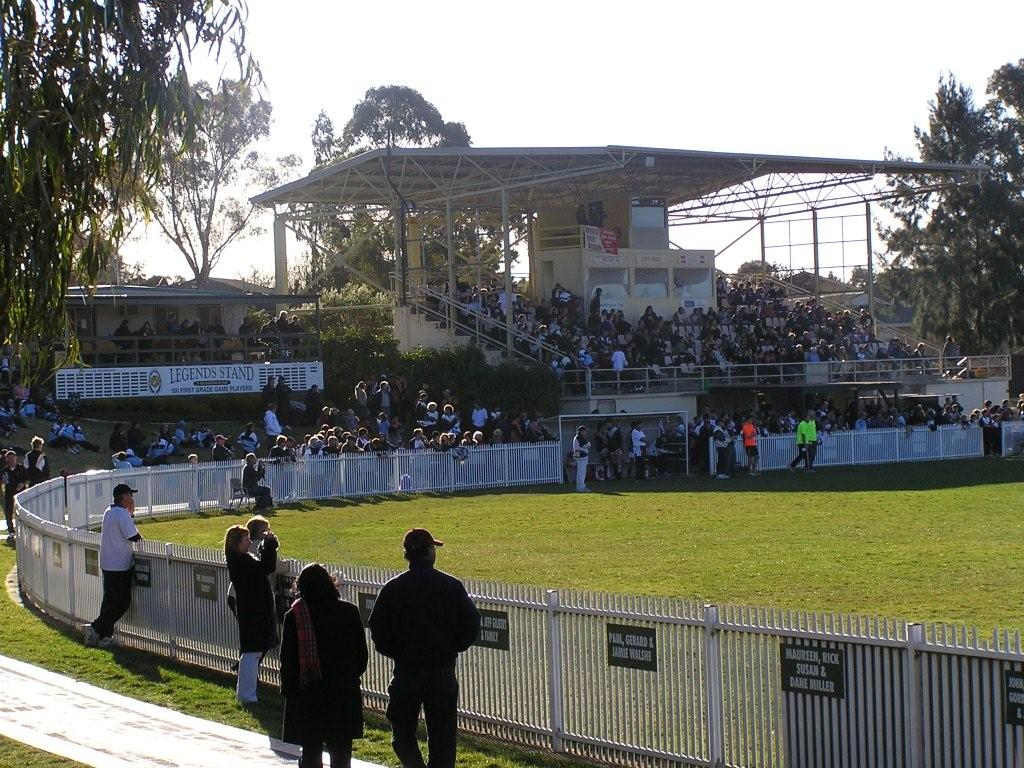
- Aulich Park. Home Ground of the Queanbeyan Tigers
- Interactive map of Aulich Park
- Former names: Margaret Donoghoe Oval Dairy Farmers Park Allinsure Park
- Location: Queenbar Rd Karabar NSW 2620 Queanbeyan
- Owner: Queanbeyan Football Club
- Operator: Queanbeyan Tigers
- Capacity: 8,000
- Surface: Grass
- Record attendance: 10,000

Construction
- Opened: 1979

Tenants
- Queanbeyan Tigers, AFL Canberra

The Margaret Donoghoe Sportsground (currently known by naming rights as Aulich Park, previously Allinsure Park and Dairy Farmers Park) is a sports facility in Queanbeyan, New South Wales, Australia. It is situated in the town of Karabar.

== History and facilities ==
Since 1979, the Queanbeyan Tigers Football Club has been located at Aulich Park and supporters have raised $800,000 (in addition to grants from the Tigers Licensed Club) to install facilities such as a roofed grandstand, Interchange and Coaches Boxes for home and visiting teams, an Administration Building, ground lighting, a Hall of Fame walk, canteen, goal netting, scoreboards and disabled access.
