= List of Australian rules football clubs in Queensland =

This is a list of clubs that play Australian rules football in Queensland at the various levels of senior men's football.

== National Level ==
=== Australian Football League ===
Club	Colours	Nickname	Home venue	Former league	Est.	Years in AFL	Premierships	
Club	Colours	Nickname	Home venue	Former league	Est.	Years in AFL	Total	Most recent
Brisbane		Lions	The Gabba, Woolloongabba	—	1996	1997–	5	2025
Gold Coast		Suns	People First Stadium, Carrara	VFL	2009	2011–	0	—

== State Level ==
=== Victorian Football League ===
Club	Colours	Nickname	Home venue	Former league	Est.	Years in VFA/VFL	Premierships	
Club	Colours	Nickname	Home venue	Former league	Est.	Years in VFA/VFL	Total	Most recent
Brisbane (R)		Lions	Brighton Homes Arena	NEAFL	1998	2021–	0	—
Gold Coast (R)		Suns	People First Stadium	NEAFL	2011	2021–	1	2023
Southport		Sharks	Fankhauser Reserve	NEAFL	1961	2021–	0	—

=== Queensland Australian Football League ===
Club	Colours	Nickname	Home venue	Former league(s)	Est.	Years in QAFL	QAFL Premierships	
Club	Colours	Nickname	Home venue	Former league(s)	Est.	Years in QAFL	Total	Most recent
Aspley		Hornets	Graham Road Oval, Carseldine	NEAFL, VFL	1964	2009–2013, 2022–	2	2023
Broadbeach		Cats	Subaru Oval, Mermaid Waters	GCAFL, NEAFL	1971	1997–	1	2021
Coorparoo		Kings, Roos	Giffin Park, Coorparoo	QFA	1996	2025–	0	–
Labrador		Tigers	Cooke Murphy Oval, Labrador	GCAFL, NEAFL	1964	1997–	2	2016
Maroochydore		Roos, Maroochy	Neil Upton Oval, Maroochydore	QFA	1970	1998–1999, 2020–	0	−
Morningside		Panthers	Jack Esplen Oval, Hawthorne	–	1947	1948–1950, 1953–	11	2024
Mount Gravatt		Vultures	Dittmer Park, Upper Mt-Gravatt	QFA	1964	1994–	2	2007
Noosa		Tigers	Noosa Oval, Noosaville	QFA	1970	2021–	0	−
Palm Beach Currumbin		Lions	Salk Oval, Palm Beach	GCAFL	1961	2014–	2	2018
Redland-Victoria Point		Sharks	Totally Workwear Park, Victoria Point	–	2020	2021–	1	2025
Sherwood Districts		Magpies	Powenyenna Oval, Chelmer	–	1991	1991–1997, 2001–2004, 2009–2010, 2014–	1	1996
Surfers Paradise		Demons	Sir Bruce Small Park, Benowa	QFA	1962	2014–	1	2019
Wilston Grange		Gorillas	Hickey Park, Stafford	QFA	1945	1945–1989, 2014–	3	1972

=== Queensland Women's Australian Football League ===
Club	Colours	Nickname	Home ground	Est.	Years in comp.	Premierships	
Club	Colours	Nickname	Home ground	Est.	Years in comp.	Total	Recent
Aspley		Hornets	Automall Aspley Oval, Carseldine	1964	2019–	0	–
Broadbeach		Cats	Neptune Homes Oval, Mermaid Waters	1971	2026–	0	–
Bond University		Bull Sharks	Bond University Oval, Robina	2011	2018–	1	2023
Coorparoo		Kings	Giffin Park, Coorparoo	1996	2013–	4	2019
Maroochydore		Roos	Neil Upton Oval, Maroochydore	1970	2017–	0	–
Moreton Bay		Lions	Red Rooster Park, Burpengary	1987	2025–	0	–
Morningside		Panthers	Jack Esplen Oval, Hawthorne	1947	?-2012, 2025–	2	2005
Southport		Sharks	Fankhauser Reserve, Southport	1961	2022–	2	2025
University of Queensland		Red Lionesses	Base Architecture Meadows, St Lucia	1956	2013–	2	2022
Wilston Grange		Gorillas	Hickey Park, Stafford	1945	2014–	1	2018

== Metropolitan ==
=== Queensland Football Association ===
Club	Colours	Nickname	Home Ground	Former league	Est.	Years in QFA	QFA senior premierships	
Club	Colours	Nickname	Home Ground	Former league	Est.	Years in QFA	Total	Most recent
Alexandra Hills (Capalaba 1980–91)		Bombers	Keith Surridge Park, Alexandra Hills	–	1980	1980–	3	2023
Aspley thirds		Hornets	Graham Road, Carseldine	–	1964	1970–	10	2017
Beenleigh		Buffaloes	Guardian Gantry Hire Oval, Dauth Park, Beenleigh	–	1998	1998–	1	2009
Bond University		Bullsharks	Bond University Oval, Robina	–	2011	2011–	4	2025
Broadbeach thirds		Cats	Subaru Oval, Mermaid Waters	–	1971	2026–	0	–
Burleigh		Bombers	Bill Godfrey Oval, Burleigh Waters	QAFL	c. 1979	2000–	5	2023
Caloundra		Panthers	Carter Park, Golden Beach	SCAFL	1973	1993–	5	2025
Carrara		Saints	Alan Nielsen Oval, Carrara	–	1998	2012–	1	2018
Collingwood Park		Power	Redbank Plains Recreational Reserve, Redbank Plains	–	1980s	2010–	1	2021
Coolangatta Tweed Heads		Blues	EXIMM Oval, Coolangatta	QAFL	1962	2000–	4	2024
Coomera		Magpies	Coomera Sports Park, Coomera	–	1997	2009–	1	2013
Coorparoo fourths (Note: Established in 1996 as the Treasury Kings, one year after the original Coorparoo FC folded. Known as Coorparoo since 1999.)		Kings	Giffin Park, Coorparoo	–	1996	1996–	8	2024
Ferny Grove		Falcons	Ferny Grove Oval, Ferny Grove	–	1991	2015–	0	–
Glasshouse Hinterland		Lions	Landsborough Sport & Recreation Centre, Landsborough	–	1997	2001–	0	–
Gympie		Cats	Ray Warren Oval, Glanmire	SCAFL	1971	2000–2003, 2007–	4	2015
Hinterland (Nambour 1993–97, Nambour & Hinterland 2008–16)		Blues	G Rae Oval, Palmwoods	SCAFL	1970	1993–1997, 2008–	5	2022
Ipswich (RAAF 1972–2000)		Eagles	Limestone Park, Ipswich	–	1966	1972–	2	1979
Jimboomba (Southern Redbacks 2000–09)		Redbacks	Glenlogan Park, Glenlogan	–	2000	2000–	2	2011
Jindalee		Jags	Jindalee Recreation Reserve, Jindalee	–	1971	1980–1987, 2017–	1	1986
Kawana Park		Eagles	Meridan Fields Sports Complex, Meridan Plains	–	2001	2025–	0	–
Kedron		Lions	EK (Ted) Anderson Oval, Kedron	QAFL	1937	2006–	2	2015
Kenmore		Bears	Chelmer Oval, Chelmer	–	1967	1997–	5	2020
Labrador thirds		Tigers	Cooke-Murphy Oval, Labrador	–	1964	2022–	0	–
Logan City (Park Ridge 2013–24)		Pirates	Park Ridge High School, Park Ridge	–	2013	2013–	2	2019
Marcellin Old Collegians		Eagles	Hickey Park, Stafford	–	2017	2017–	1	2025
Maroochydore thirds		Roos	Neil Upton Oval, Maroochydore	–	1969	1992–1996, 2007–	8	2023
Mayne		Tigers	Enoggera Memorial Park, Enoggera	QAFL	1924	2005–	6	2025
Moorooka (Griffith Moorooka 2009–17)		Roosters	Alexander Park, Moorooka	–	1968	1974–2001, 2009–	4	2025
Moreton Bay (Caboolture 1992–2014)		Lions	Moreton Bay Regional Sports Park, Burpengary	SCAFL	1987	1991–	4	2021
Mount Gravatt thirds		Vultures	Dittmer Park, Mount Gravatt	–	1964	1970–	6	2023
Narangba		Crows	Findlay Street Sportsfields, Burpengary	–	2003	2025–	0	–
Noosa women		Tigers	Noosa Oval, Noosaville	–	1970	2020–	4	2023
North Shore		Jets	North Shore Multisports Complex, Mudjimba	–	1999	1999–	0	–
Ormeau		Bulldogs	Ormeau Sports Park, Kingsholme	–	2008	2008–	1	2020
Pacific Pines		Power	McAuley Parade Oval, Pacific Pines	–	2005	2005	3	2025
Palm Beach Currumbin women		Lions	Salk Oval, Palm Beach	–	1961	?-2013, 2023–	0	–
Pine Rivers (Strathpine 1970–2009)		Swans	Rob Akers Reserve, Strathpine	–	1970	1970–	5	2012
Pomona		Demons	Reserve Street Oval, Pomona	SCAFL, WBAFL	1973	1997–2003, 2007–2017, 2026–	2	2013
Redcliffe		Tigers	Nathan Road Sports Complex, Kippa-Ring	–	1974	1974–	6	2025
Redland-Victoria Point thirds		Sharks	Totally Workwear Park, Victoria Point	–	2014	2014–	1	2017
Robina Mudgeeraba (Robina 2000–22)		Roos	Scottsdale Reserve, Robina	QAFL	1996	2000–	3	2010
Sandgate		Hawks	Taigum Place Park, Taigum	QAFL	1943	1992–	3	2024
Sherwood thirds		Magpies	Powenyenna Oval, Chelmer	–	1991	2004–	8	2022
Southport thirds		Sharks	Fankhauser Reserve, Southport	–	1961	2024–	1	2024
Surfers Paradise thirds		Demons	Sir Bruce Small Park, Benowa	–	1962	2026–	0	–
Springwood		Pumas	Lowe Oval, Underwood	–	1972	1979–	7	2023
University of Queensland		Red Lions	University of Queensland Playing Field 2, St Lucia	QAFL	1956	1969–	3	2024
Wynnum		Vikings	Kianawah Oval, Wynnum West	–	1971	1971–	4	2009
Yeronga South Brisbane (South Brisbane 1970–90, Yeronga 1991–2009)		Devils	Leyshon Park, Yeronga	QAFL	1929	1970–	3	2018
Zillmere		Eagles	O'Callaghan Park, Zillmere	QAFL	1923	2013–	3	2017

== Country ==
=== AFL Cairns ===
Club	Colours	Nickname	Home Ground	Est.	Years in CAFL	Senior Premierships	
Club	Colours	Nickname	Home Ground	Est.	Years in CAFL	Total	Years
Cairns		Saints	Griffiths Park, Manunda	1993	1993–	13	1994, 1995, 1996, 1998, 1999, 2000, 2002, 2008, 2009, 2010, 2012, 2013, 2015
Cairns City (City United 1970–?)		Lions	Holloways Beach Sporting Complex, Holloways Beach	1969	1970–	4	1982, 1983, 2021, 2022
Centrals-Trinity Beach (Centrals-Aloomba 1963–88)		Bulldogs	Crathern Park, Trinity Beach	1963	1963–	12	1967, 1969, 1973, 1974, 1975, 1978, 1979, 1989, 1990, 1992, 1993, 1997
Manunda		Hawks	Cazalys Stadium, Westcourt	1983	1984–	4	1987, 2006, 2007, 2011
North Cairns		Tigers	Watsons Oval, Manunda	1955	1956–	11	1958, 1959, 1976. 1977, 1980, 1981, 1984, 1985, 1986, 1988, 2025
Port Douglas		Crocs	Port Douglas Sporting Complex, Port Douglas	1989	1989–	10	1991, 2001, 2005, 2014, 2016, 2017, 2018, 2019, 2020, 2023
South Cairns (South Balaclava 1963–83)		Cutters	Fretwell Park, Bentley Park	1956	1956–	10	1956, 1963, 1964, 1965, 1966, 1968, 1971, 1972, 2003, 2024

=== AFL Capricornia ===
Club	Colours	Moniker	Ground	Est.	Years in CAFL	CAFL Senior Premierships	
Club	Colours	Moniker	Ground	Est.	Years in CAFL	Total	Years
Boyne Island-Tannum Sands (BITS)		Saints	Boyne Island Oval, Boyne Island	1983	1984–	13	1994, 1996, 1997, 1998, 2000, 2001, 2002, 2003, 2006, 2008, 2011, 2012, 2013
Gladstone		Suns	Clinton Park, Clinton	1972	1973–	6	1973, 1974, 1975, 1982, 1983, 2004
Glenmore (Wandal 1968–94)		Bulls	Stenlake Park, Kawana	1973	1973–	8	1976, 1977, 1978, 1981, 1988, 1989, 1990, 2014
Kangaroos Brothers		Roos	Kele Park, West Rockhampton	1981	1982–	6	1984, 1986, 1987, 1995, 2005, 2010
Rockhampton (Parkhurst 1968–2002)		Panthers	Rockhampton Cricket Ground, The Common	1968	1969–	4	1980, 1985, 1993, 2007
Yeppoon		Swans	Swan Park, Yeppoon	1981	1982–	15	1991, 1992, 1999, 2009, 2015, 2016, 2017, 2018, 2019, 2020, 2021, 2022, 2023, 2024, 2025

=== AFL Darling Downs ===
Club	Colours	Nickname	Home Ground	Founded	Years in League	Senior Premierships	
Club	Colours	Nickname	Home Ground	Founded	Years in League	Total	Years
Coolaroo		Roos	Rockville Park, Wilsonton Heights	1971	1971–	13	1975, 2001, 2002, 2003, 2004, 2005, 2009, 2013, 2015, 2022, 2023, 2024, 2025
Goondiwindi (Goondiwindi-Moonie 1987)		Hawks	Riddles Oval, Goondiwindi	1978	1980–	8	1980, 1983, 1991, 1995, 1996, 1999, 2000, 2019
South Burnett		Saints	Lyle Vidler Oval, Kingaroy	2013	2013–	0	–
South Toowoomba (Central Bombers 2005–06)		Bombers	Heritage Oval, Southern Cross Reserve, Harlaxton	1971	1972–1994, 1996–1998, 2005–	8	1972, 1976, 1981, 1982, 1984, 2008, 2020, 2021
Toowoomba		Tigers	Rockville Park, Wilsonton Heights	1973	1974–2002, 2004–	6	1977, 1979, 1988, 2010, 2011, 2012
University (Institute 1976–89)		Cougars	Baker St Oval, Darling Heights	1976	1976–	13	1978, 1986, 1987, 1990, 1992, 1994, 1997, 1998, 2006, 2007, 2016, 2017, 2018
Warwick		Redbacks	Roddies Oval, Warwick	1996	1999–	1	2014

=== AFL Mackay ===
Club	Colours	Nickname	Home Ground	Former League	Est.	Years in MAFL	MAFL Senior Premierships	
Club	Colours	Nickname	Home Ground	Former League	Est.	Years in MAFL	Total	Years
Bakers Creek		Tigers	Etwell Park, Bakers Creek	–	1971	1971–	9	1971, 1972, 1979, 1981, 1989, 1990, 1991, 1992, 1999
Eastern Swans (East Mackay 1970–86)		Swans	Rogers Oval, South Mackay	–	1970	1970–	7	1970, 1973, 1980, 1988, 1998, 2009, 2015, 2024
Mackay (Andergrove 2011; Northern Beaches 2012–14)		Magpies	Magpies Sports Park, Glenella	–	2011	2011–	0	–
Mackay City (Northern Beaches 1990–97)		Hawks	Harrup Park, South Mackay	–	1977	1977–1978, 1980–	8	1985, 1986, 1997, 2000, 2011, 2012, 2013, 2016
Moranbah		Bulldogs	Stevenson Sports Park, Moranbah	CHAFL	1975	1975–1982, 1989–1991, 2006–	3	1977, 1978, 2014
North Mackay		Saints	Zeolla Park, Beaconsfield	–	1970	1970–	15	1974, 1976, 1983, 1987, 2001, 2002, 2003, 2007, 2008, 2019, 2020, 2021, 2022, 2023, 2025
Whitsunday (Airlie Beach 1985–89)		Sea Eagles	Whitsundays Sports Park, Jubilee Pocket	–	1985	1985–	10	1992, 1993, 1994, 1995, 2004, 2005, 2006, 2010, 2017, 2018

=== AFL Mount Isa ===
Club	Colours	Nickname	Home Ground	Est.	Years in MIAFL	MIAFL Senior Premierships	
Club	Colours	Nickname	Home Ground	Est.	Years in MIAFL	Total	Years
Dajarra		Rhinos	Monument Sports Oval, Dajarra	2018	2018–	0	–
Mount Isa Buffaloes		Buffaloes	Legend Oval, Mount Isa	1983	1983–	9	1992, 1994, 1995, 2017, 2018, 2020, 2021, 2023, 2024
Mount Isa Tigers (Barkly 1967-70s)		Tigers	Legend Oval, Mount Isa	1967	1967–	13	1971, 1973, 1983, 1989, 1998, 1999, 2006, 2011, 2014, 2015, 2016, 2019, 2022

=== AFL Townsville ===
Club	Colours	Nickname	Home Ground(s)	Est.	Years in TAFL	TAFL Senior Premierships	
Club	Colours	Nickname	Home Ground(s)	Est.	Years in TAFL	Total	Years
Curra		Swans, Mud Ducks	Muldoon Oval ("The Pond"), Annandale	1990	1990–	4	1996, 1997, 1998, 2020
Hermit Park		Tigers	Neil French Oval, Annandale	1955	1955–	14	1955, 1967, 1970, 1984/85, 1986/87, 2002, 2006, 2008, 2012, 2015, 2017, 2018, 2019, 2021
Northern Beaches		Suns	North Shore Oval, Burdell	2016	2016–	0	–
Thuringowa (West Townsville 1970–2001)		Bulldogs	Riverway Stadium, Thuringowa Central	1970	1970–	15	1971, 1980, 1987/88, 1990, 1991, 1992, 1999, 2000, 2001, 2010, 2011, 2013, 2014, 2016, 2022, 2023, 2024, 2025
University		Hawks	Riverway Stadium, Thuringowa Central	1989	1989–	9	1989, 1993, 1994. 1995, 2003, 2004, 2005, 2007, 2009

=== AFL Wide Bay ===
Club	Colours	Nickname	Home ground	Former league	Est.	Years in WBAFL	WBAFL Senior Premierships	
Club	Colours	Nickname	Home ground	Former league	Est.	Years in WBAFL	Total	Years
Across The Waves		Eagles	Frank Coulthard Oval, Norville	–	1997	1997–	11	1997, 1998, 1999, 2001, 2006, 2008, 2011, 2014, 2015, 2016, 2020
Bay Power		Power	Keith Dunne Oval, Urangan	–	2004	2004–	1	2019
Brothers Bulldogs (West Bundaberg 1987–96)		Bulldogs	Brothers Sporting Complex, Kensington	BAFL	1972	1987–	3	1987, 1995, 2010
Hervey Bay Bombers		Bombers	N. E. Mclean Oval, Wondunna	WBAFL	1977	1987–	20	1988, 1989, 1990, 1991, 1992, 1994, 1996, 2000, 2002, 2004, 2005, 2007, 2009, 2012, 2013, 2021, 2022, 2023, 2024, 2025
Maryborough		Bears	AFL Federation Reserve, Maryborough	WBAFL	1977	1988, 1990–1991, 1993–1999, 2001–2012, 2015–2017, 2019–2021, 2023-	0	–
