= 2023 in Australian rules football =

The following are the events of Australian rules football for the calendar year 2023, 165 years after the first game was played in 1858.

== National ==
=== AFL ===
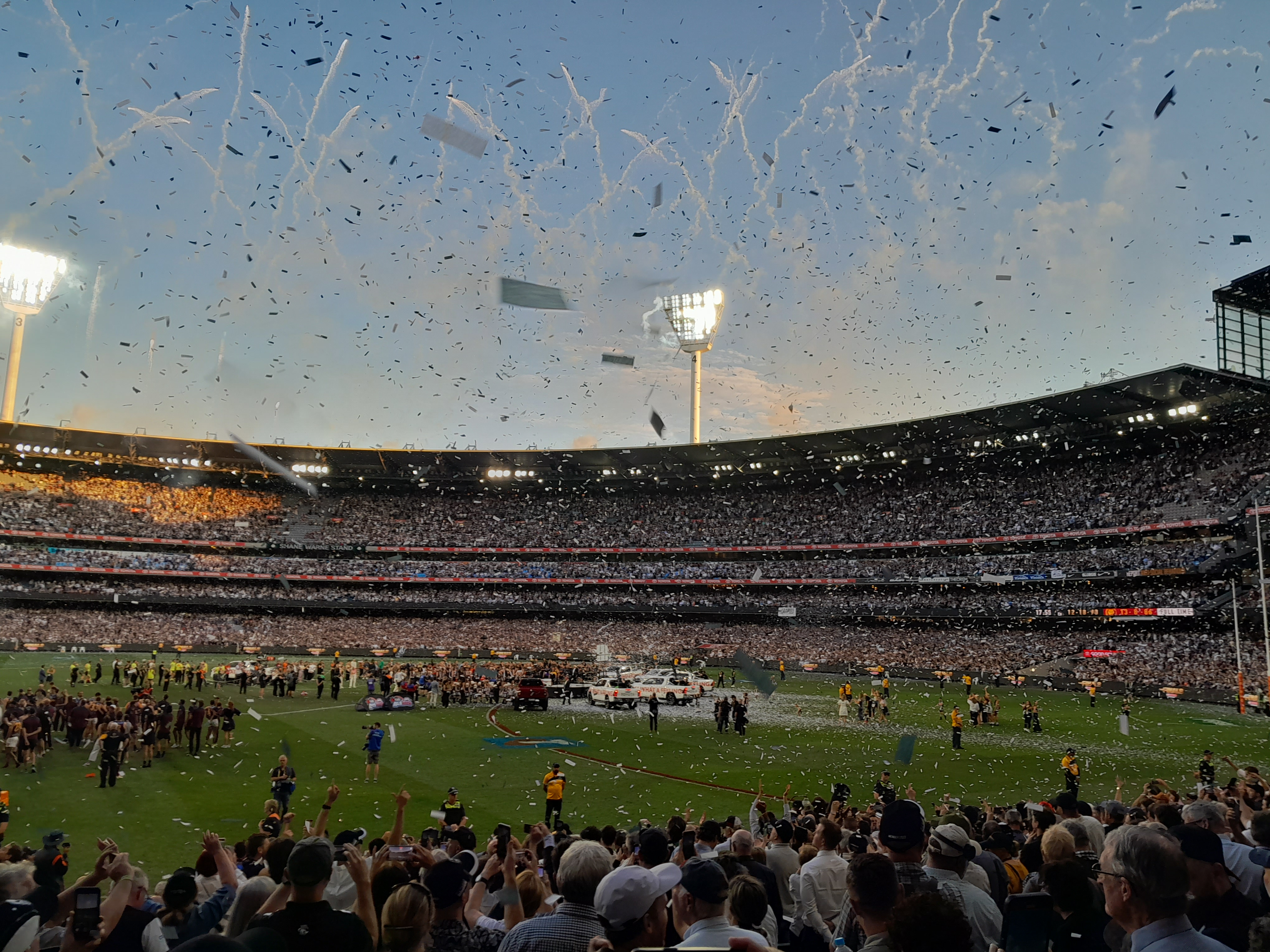
Celebrations at the Melbourne Cricket Ground after the AFL Grand Final

In the Australian Football League (AFL), Collingwood won their 16th VFL/AFL premiership (and 17th senior premiership) after defeating Brisbane Lions by four points in the 2023 AFL Grand Final.

The AFL fixture was extended to 23 matches per club, the longest in history, to accommodate the introduction of Gather Round, a special round featuring all 18 clubs playing in the same city and its surrounds. South Australia won the bid for the event.

In the AFL Women's (AFLW), Brisbane won their second women's premiership with a 19-point victory over North Melbourne in the 2023 AFL Women's Grand Final.

Melbourne won the McClelland Trophy, the format of which was altered to a club championship including results from both the AFL and AFL Women's 2023 seasons. Under the points system, Melbourne won 128 points with a percentage of 142.3, clear of second-place Brisbane Lions, who won 116 points and 126.4 percentage.

In May 2023, Tasmania secured an AFL licence for the first time, following a unanimous vote of AFL club presidents.

Gillon McLachlan stepped down as AFL CEO in October 2023 and was replaced by Andrew Dillon.

=== VFL ===
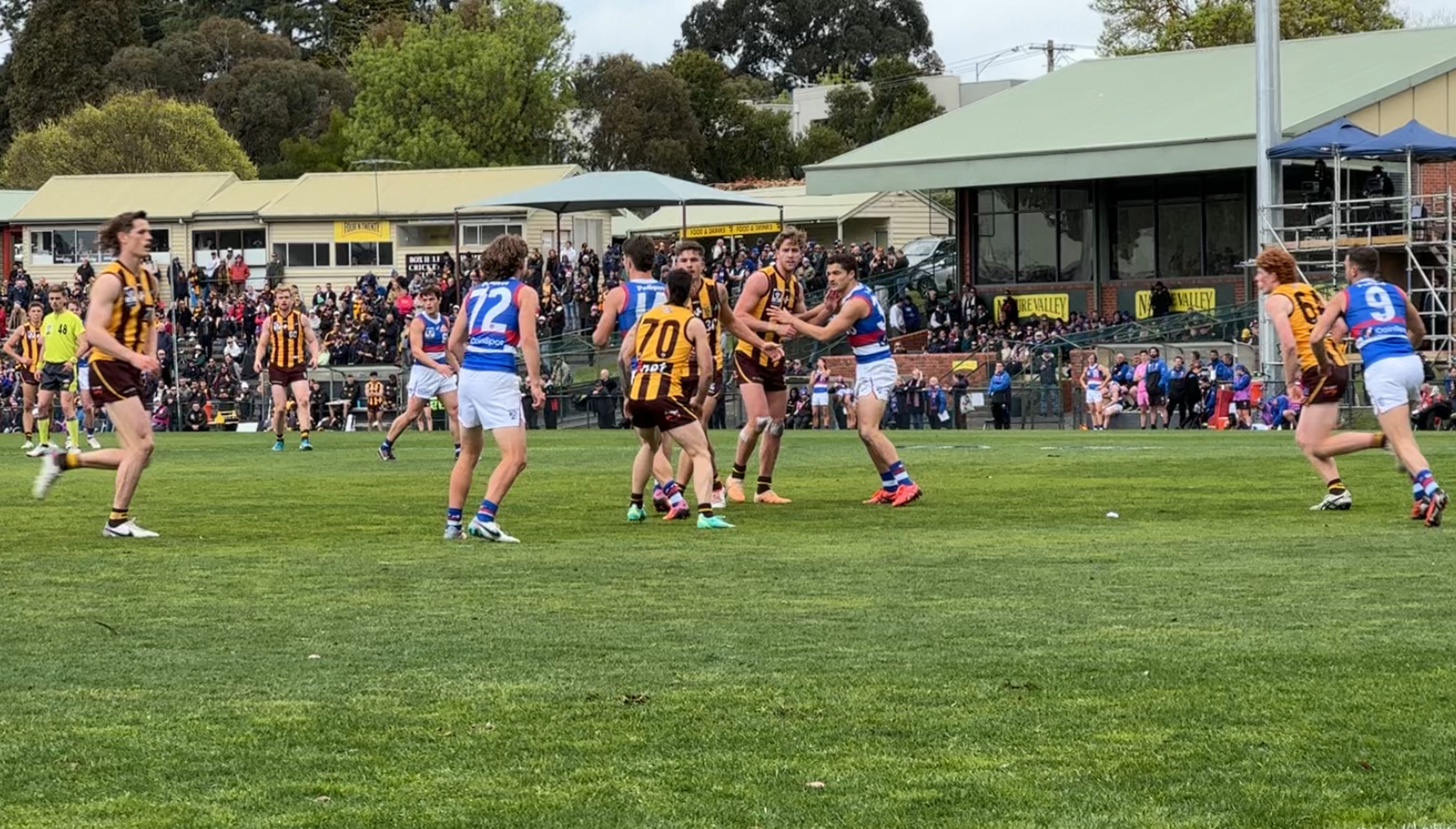
Box Hill plays Footscray at home in the second VFL semi-final

In the Victorian Football League (VFL), a non-Victorian team won the premiership for the first time, with Gold Coast defeating Werribee by 19 points in the 2023 VFL Grand Final.

=== Talent League ===
Sandringham Dragons won their 5th Talent League Boys premiership, while Oakleigh Chargers won their second Talent League Girls premiership after defeating minor premiers Eastern Ranges in the Grand Final.

== Australian Capital Territory ==
Ainslie won a total of four premierships in 2023, and were runners-up in a fifth grand final.

=== Premiers ===
==== Men's ====
| League | Division/ Grade | Premiers | | Runners-up | | Date | Ref. |
| League | Division/ Grade | Club | Score | Club | Score | Date | Ref. |
|---|---|---|---|---|---|---|---|
| AFL Canberra | First Grade | Belconnen | 10.11 (71) | Ainslie | 4.8 (32) | 9 September 2023 | |
| AFL Canberra | Second Grade | Ainslie | 4.8 (32) | Belconnen | 3.2 (20) | 9 September 2023 | |
| AFL Canberra | Rising Stars | Belconnen | 11.7 (73) | Eastlake | 8.4 (52) | 10 September 2023 | |
| AFL Canberra Community | Division 1 | Batemans Bay | 11.6 (72) | ANU Griffins | 3.11 (29) | 2 September 2023 | |
| AFL Canberra Community | Division 2 | ANU Griffins | 8.12 (60) | Woden | 8.4 (52) | 2 September 2023 | |
| AFL Canberra Community | Division 3 | Murrumbateman | 6.11 (47) | Goulburn | 6.5 (41) | 2 September 2023 | |

==== Women's ====
| League | Division/ Grade | Premiers | | Runners-up | | Date | Ref. |
| League | Division/ Grade | Club | Score | Club | Score | Date | Ref. |
|---|---|---|---|---|---|---|---|
| AFL Canberra | First Grade | Ainslie | 10.11 (71) | Belconnen | 1.6 (12) | 9 September 2023 | |
| AFL Canberra | Second Grade | Ainslie | 2.4 (16) | Eastlake | 1.1 (7) | 9 September 2023 | |
| AFL Canberra | Rising Stars | Ainslie | 10.12 (72) | Belconnen | 2.1 (13) | 10 September 2023 | |
| AFL Canberra Community | Division 1 | Googong | 6.5 (41) | Batemans Bay | 3.4 (22) | 2 September 2023 | |

== New South Wales ==
=== Premiers ===
==== Men's ====
| League | Division/ Grade | Premiers | | Runners-up | | Date | Ref |
| League | Division/ Grade | Club | Score | Club | Score | Date | Ref |
|---|---|---|---|---|---|---|---|
| AFL Central West | Tier 1 | Bathurst Giants | 16.17 (113) | Bathurst Bushrangers | 11.9 (75) | 2 September 2023 | |
| AFL Central West | Tier 2 | Cowra Blues | 10.3 (63) | Parkes Panthers | 5.4 (34) | 2 September 2023 | |
| AFL Hunter Central Coast | Black Diamond Cup | Newcastle City | 12.10 (82) | Terrigal-Avoca | 10.13 (73) | 16 September 2023 | |
| AFL North Coast | Seniors | Byron Bay | 14.12 (96) | Port Macquarie | 5.9 (39) | 2 September 2023 | |
| AFL North West | Seniors | Inverell | 10.12 (72) | Tamworth | 8.8 (56) | 26 August 2023 | |
| AFL Sapphire Coast | Seniors | Narooma | 11.10 (76) | Merimbula | 6.4 (40) | 2 September 2023 | |
| AFL South Coast | Premier | Figtree | 10.13 (73) | Northern District | 5.3 (33) | 9 September 2023 | |
| AFL Sydney | Premier | UNSW-ES | 10.6 (66) | North Shore | 6.10 (46) | 9 September 2023 | |
| Farrer FL | Seniors | The Rock-Yerong Creek | 9.5 (59) | Northern Jets | 7.10 (52) | 9 September 2023 | |
| Hume FNL | Seniors | Osborne | 15.16 (106) | Holbrook | 8.8 (56) | 23 September 2023 | |
| Northern Riverina FNL | Seniors | Hillston | 12.18 (90) | Tullibigeal | 9.7 (61) | 19 August 2023 | |
| Riverina FNL | Seniors | Turvey Park | 13.9 (87) | Griffith | 8.8 (56) | 16 September 2023 | |

==== Women's ====
| League | Division/ Grade | Premiers | | Runners-up | | Date | Ref |
| League | Division/ Grade | Club | Score | Club | Score | Date | Ref |
|---|---|---|---|---|---|---|---|
| AFL Central West | Seniors | Dubbo | 5.7 (37) | Bathurst Giants | 5.2 (32) | 2 September 2023 | |
| AFL Hunter Central Coast | Black Diamond Cup | Newcastle City | 7.6 (48) | Killarney Vale | 2.5 (17) | 16 September 2023 | |
| AFL North Coast | Seniors | Coffs Harbour | 3.3 (21) | Northern Beaches | 0.5 (5) | 2 September 2023 | |
| AFL North West | Seniors | Gunnedah | 4.10 (34) | Inverell | 2.9 (21) | 26 August 2023 | |
| AFL Sapphire Coast | Seniors | Tathra | 5.16 (46) | Bermagui | 0.1 (1) | 2 September 2023 | |
| AFL South Coast | Division 1 | Kiama | 8.5 (53) | Northern District | 0.0 (0) | 9 September 2023 | |
| AFL Sydney | Division 1 | St George | 2.2 (14) | UTS | 1.2 (8) | 2 September 2023 | |
| Farrer FL | Seniors | The Rock-Yerong Creek | 9.5 (59) | Northern Jets | 7.10 (52) | 9 September 2023 | |

== Queensland ==
=== QAFL ===
In the Queensland Australian Football League (QAFL), Aspley won the premiership for the second consecutive time, after defeating Redland-Victoria Point by 42 points in the 2023 QAFL Grand Final.

In the QAFL Women's (QAFLW), Bond University defeated Aspley by 49 points.

=== Other leagues ===
During the AFL Mount Isa grand final between Alpurrurulam Bats and Mount Isa Buffs, supporters of Alpurrurulam stormed the field in protest of an umpiring decision. Two men were later charged with assaulting police officers.

=== Premiers ===
==== Men's ====
| League | Division/ Grade | Premiers | | Runners-up | | Date | Ref |
| League | Division/ Grade | Club | Score | Club | Score | Date | Ref |
|---|---|---|---|---|---|---|---|
| AFL Cairns | Seniors | Port Douglas | 12.7 (79) | Cairns | 6.9 (45) | 23 September 2023 | |
| AFL Capricornia | Seniors | Yeppoon | 6.14 (50) | BITS Saints | 6.8 (44) | 2 September 2023 | |
| AFL Darling Downs | Seniors | Coolaroo | 13.15 (93) | Goondiwindi Hawks | 7.5 (47) | 2 September 2023 | |
| AFL Mackay | Seniors | North Mackay | 9.4 (58) | Eastern Swans | 5.4 (34) | 9 September 2023 | |
| AFL Townsville | Seniors | Thuringowa | 11.15 (81) | Hermit Park | 3.4 (22) | 9 September 2023 | |
| AFL Wide Bay | Seniors | Hervey Bay | 6.11 (47) | Brothers Bulldogs | 5.3 (33) | 26 August 2023 | |
| QAFL | Seniors | Aspley | 16.12 (108) | Redland-Victoria Point | 9.12 (66) | 16 September 2023 | |
| QFA | Division 1 | Springwood | 12.9 (81) | Coorparoo | 10.9 (69) | 2 September 2023 | |
| QFA | Division 2 North | Alexandra Hills | 7.7 (49) | Kenmore | 5.10 (40) | 10 September 2023 | |
| QFA | Division 2 South | Burleigh | 15.6 (96) | Bond University | 8.8 (56) | 9 September 2023 | |
| QFA | Division 3 North | Maroochydore | 9.13 (67) | North Shore | 4.8 (32) | 8 September 2023 | |
| QFA | Division 3 South | Pacific Pines | 11.5 (71) | Coorparoo | 6.16 (52) | 1 September 2023 | |
| QFA | Division 4 North | Caloundra | 3.17 (35) | University of Queensland | 3.3 (21) | 8 September 2023 | |
| QFA | Division 4 South | Mount Gravatt | 12.14 (86) | Coolangatta | 3.1 (19) | 1 September 2023 | |

==== Women's ====
| League | Division/ Grade | Premiers | | Runners-up | | Date | Ref |
| League | Division/ Grade | Club | Score | Club | Score | Date | Ref |
|---|---|---|---|---|---|---|---|
| AFL Cairns | Seniors | Manunda | 3.5 (23) | Cairns | 2.4 (16) | 23 September 2023 | |
| AFL Capricornia | Seniors | Yeppoon | 6.1 (37) | Rockhampton | 5.4 (34) | 2 September 2023 | |
| AFL Darling Downs | Seniors | Toowoomba | 3.5 (23) | University Cougars | 2.2 (14) | 2 September 2023 | |
| AFL Mackay | Seniors | North Mackay | 5.8 (38) | Mackay City | 0.1 (1) | 9 September 2023 | |
| AFL Townsville | Seniors | Hermit Park | 4.8 (32) | Curra | 2.1 (13) | 9 September 2023 | |
| AFL Wide Bay | Seniors | Across The Waves | 3.7 (25) | Bay Power | 2.2 (14) | 26 August 2023 | |
| QAFLW | Seniors | Bond University | 10.6 (66) | Aspley | 2.5 (17) | 27 August 2023 | |
| QFAW | Division 1 | Moreton Bay | 7.5 (47) | Morningside | 5.3 (33) | 2 September 2023 | |
| QFAW | Division 2 North | Noosa | 7.5 (47) | Caloundra | 4.1 (25) | 10 September 2023 | |
| QFAW | Division 2 South | Tweed Coast | 7.3 (45) | Ballina | 2.1 (13) | 9 September 2023 | |

== Tasmania ==
=== TSL ===
Kingborough won their first Tasmanian State League (TSL) premiership, defeating North Launceston by 15 points.

=== Premiers ===
==== Men's ====
| League | Division/ Grade | Premiers | | Runners-up | | Date | Ref |
| League | Division/ Grade | Club | Score | Club | Score | Date | Ref |
|---|---|---|---|---|---|---|---|
| Circular Head FA | Seniors | Redpa | 8.10 (58) | Scotchtown | 8.4 (54) | 26 August 2023 | |
| Darwin FA | Seniors | South Burnie | 14.11 (95) | Queenstown | 5.8 (38) | 2 September 2023 | |
| King Island FA | Seniors | Grassy | 17.11 (113) | Currie | 5.3 (33) | 26 August 2023 | |
| Northern Tasmanian FA | Premier | Rocherlea | 8.15 (63) | Hillwood | 8.5 (53) | 16 September 2023 | |
| Northern Tasmanian FA | Division 1 | Old Scotch Collegians | 11.11 (77) | St Patrick | 7.9 (51) | 9 September 2023 | |
| North West FL | Seniors | Devonport | 14.13 (97) | Burnie | 8.8 (56) | 23 September 2023 | |
| North Western FA | Seniors | Motton Preston | 8.12 (60) | Wesley Vale | 6.10 (46) | 9 September 2023 | |
| Oatlands District FA | Seniors | Triabunna | 11.13 (79) | Campbell Town | 10.6 (66) | 19 August 2023 | |
| Old Scholars FA | Seniors | St Virgils | 22.17 (149) | University | 7.6 (48) | 9 September 2023 | |
| Southern FL | Seniors | Cygnet | 14.14 (98) | Huonville | 9.8 (62) | 16 September 2023 | |
| TSL | Seniors | Kingborough | 8.8 (56) | North Launceston | 5.11 (41) | 23 September 2023 | |
| TSL | Development | North Hobart | 7.6 (48) | North Launceston | 5.8 (38) | 23 September 2023 | |

==== Women's ====
| League | Division/ Grade | Premiers | | Runners-up | | Date | Ref |
| League | Division/ Grade | Club | Score | Club | Score | Date | Ref |
|---|---|---|---|---|---|---|---|
| Northern Tasmanian FA | Premier | Old Launcestonians | 4.3 (27) | Bridgenorth | 1.6 (12) | 16 September 2023 | |
| Northern Tasmanian FA | Division 1 | Deloraine | 3.6 (24) | Meander Valley | 2.3 (15) | 9 September 2023 | |
| North West FL | Seniors | Wynyard | 11.13 (79) | Penguin | 2.7 (19) | 27 August 2023 | |
| Southern FL | Division 1 | North Hobart | 5.3 (33) | Kingborough | 3.5 (23) | 10 September 2023 | |
| Southern FL | Division 2 | Claremont | 5.4 (34) | Lauderdale | 3.5 (23) | 10 September 2023 | |
| Southern FL | Division 3 | St Virgils | 7.8 (50) | Dodges Ferry | 1.3 (9) | 10 September 2023 | |

== Victoria ==
=== VFLW ===
In the VFL Women's (VFLW), Port Melbourne won their first VFLW premiership after defeating Collingwood in the grand final, a week after eliminating defending premiers Essendon in the preliminary final.

There was one change to the competition, with the Hawthorn Football Club transferring their VFLW license to Box Hill during the off-season, replicating the club's men's team reserves arrangement in the AFL and VFL.

=== VAFA ===
In the Victorian Amateur Football Association (VAFA), Collegians won their 18th Premier Division premiership, defeating St Kevin's by 85 points.

St Kevin's won their second consecutive VAFA Women's (VAFAW) premiership, defeating Kew by 25 points.

Although they were defeated in the Premier B Grand Final, Fitzroy was promoted to Premier Division for the first time since the club entered the VAFA.

Two clubs − Westbourne Grammarians and Old Mentonians − were in recess for the 2023 season.

=== Other leagues ===
On 28 March 2023, the Ovens & Murray Football Netball League (OMFNL) announced the Wangaratta Magpies would be stripped of their 2022 premiership following salary cap breaches. The OMFNL operates with a $125,000 salary cap, which the Magpies exceeded in 2022.

This was the first time in regional Victorian football that such a penalty had been handed down because of a salary cap breach. As a result, no premier was declared for the 2022 OMFNL season.

=== Premiers ===
==== Men's ====
| League | Division/ Grade | Premiers | | Runners-up | | Date | Ref |
| League | Division/ Grade | Club | Score | Club | Score | Date | Ref |
|---|---|---|---|---|---|---|---|
| Ballarat FNL | Seniors | Darley | 11.5 (71) | North Ballarat | 10.10 (70) | 23 September 2023 | |
| Bellarine FNL | Seniors | Torquay | 16.14 (110) | Drysdale | 12.6 (78) | 9 September 2023 | |
| Bendigo FNL | Seniors | Golden Square | 10.11 (71) | Sandhurst | 9.11 (65) | 23 September 2023 | |
| Central Highlands FL | Seniors | Gordon | 13.13 (91) | Springbank | 5.4 (34) | 16 September 2023 | |
| Central Murray FNL | Seniors | Kerang | 11.10 (76) | Balranald | 9.12 (66) | 23 September 2023 | |
| Colac & District FNL | Seniors | South Colac | 9.5 (59) | Irrewarra-Beeac | 6.2 (38) | 10 September 2023 | |
| East Gippsland FNL | Seniors | Wy Yung | 6.11 (47) | Boisdale Briagolong | 5.9 (39) | 2 September 2023 | |
| Eastern FNL | Premier | Rowville | 9.12 (66) | Vermont | 8.8 (56) | 16 September 2023 | |
| Eastern FNL | Division 1 | Mitcham | 8.10 (58) | South Belgrave | 8.5 (53) | 9 September 2023 | |
| Eastern FNL | Division 2 | Boronia | 15.8 (98) | Heathmont | 9.12 (66) | 10 September 2023 | |
| Eastern FNL | Division 3 | Donvale | 16.8 (104) | Ferntree Gully | 6.8 (44) | 2 September 2023 | |
| Eastern FNL | Division 4 | Surrey Park | 14.17 (101) | Kilsyth | 6.9 (45) | 3 September 2023 | |
| Ellinbank & District FL | Seniors | Buln Buln | 9.11 (65) | Neerim | 5.5 (35) | 16 September 2023 | |
| Essendon District FL | Premier | Keilor | 20.7 (127) | Strathmore | 11.9 (75) | 23 September 2023 | |
| Essendon District FL | Division 1 | Deer Park | 21.14 (140) | West Coburg | 6.8 (44) | 16 September 2023 | |
| Essendon District FL | Division 2 | Oak Park | 2.15 (135) | Sunbury Kangaroos | 8.8 (56) | 9 September 2023 | |
| Geelong FNL | Seniors | Leopold | 13.16 (94) | South Barwon | 6.8 (44) | 23 September 2023 | |
| Geelong & District FNL | Seniors | Inverleigh | 15.5 (95) | Thomson | 4.8 (32) | 16 September 2023 | |
| Gippsland League | Seniors | Leongatha | 14.5 (89) | Wonthaggi | 7.7 (49) | 23 September 2023 | |
| Golden Rivers FNL | Seniors | Hay | 11.15 (81) | Ultima | 6.16 (52) | 16 September 2023 | |
| Goulburn Valley FNL | Seniors | Echuca | 15.13 (103) | Kyabram | 9.13 (67) | 24 September 2023 | |
| Hampden FNL | Seniors | South Warrnambool | 9.13 (67) | North Warrnambool | 4.8 (32) | 23 September 2023 | |
| Heathcote District FL | Seniors | Mount Pleasant | 12.7 (79) | Heathcote | 9.6 (60) | 16 September 2023 | |
| Horsham District FNL | Seniors | Harrow Balmoral | 11.3 (69) | Jeparit-Rainbow | 7.7 (49) | 9 September 2023 | |
| Kyabram District FNL | Seniors | Lancaster | 19.11 (125) | Nagambie | 8.12 (60) | 16 September 2023 | |
| Loddon Valley FNL | Seniors | Marong | 8.16 (64) | Pyramid Hill | 6.12 (48) | 9 September 2023 | |
| Maryborough Castlemaine; District FNL | Seniors | Harcourt | 11.7 (73) | Carisbrook | 9.8 (62) | 16 September 2023 | |
| Mid Gippsland FNL | Seniors | Fish Creek | 9.12 (66) | Newborough | 5.8 (38) | 16 September 2023 | |
| Millewa | Seniors | Bambill | 12.12 (84) | Gol Gol | 11.5 (71) | 2 September 2023 | |
| Mininera & District FL | Seniors | Tatyoon | 10.2 (62) | Woorndoo Mortlake | 6.12 (48) | 9 September 2023 | |
| Mornington Peninsula; Nepean FNL | Division 1 | Dromana | 14.13 (97) | Frankston YCW | 6.7 (43) | 17 September 2023 | |
| Mornington Peninsula; Nepean FNL | Division 2 | Mornington | 9.7 (61) | Somerville | 7.10 (52) | 9 September 2023 | |
| Murray FNL | Seniors | Mulwala | 14.14 (98) | Congupna | 9.11 (65) | 16 September 2023 | |
| North Central FL | Seniors | Sea Lake | 10.16 (76) | Nullawil | 9.8 (62) | 16 September 2023 | |
| North Gippsland FL | Seniors | Traralgon Tyers United | 4.14 (38) | Woodside | 2.8 (20) | 9 September 2023 | |
| Northern FNL | Division 1 | Heidelberg | 15.7 (97) | Bundoora | 11.8 (74) | 23 September 2023 | |
| Northern FNL | Division 2 | Eltham | 12.13 (85) | Diamond Creek | 6.8 (44) | 16 September 2023 | |
| Northern FNL | Division 3 | Laurimar | 13.5 (83) | Mernda | 11.11 (77) | 9 September 2023 | |
| Omeo District FNL | Seniors | Swifts Creek | 11.6 (72) | Omeo Benambra | 7.8 (50) | 26 August 2023 | |
| Outer East FNL | Premier | Wandin | 21.15 (141) | Narre Warren | 11.12 (78) | 23 September 2023 | |
| Outer East FNL | Division 1 | Emerald | 14.16 (100) | Berwick Springs | 5.11 (41) | 17 September 2023 | |
| Outer East FNL | Division 2 | Powelltown | 17.12 (114) | Alexandra | 15.11 (101) | 2 September 2023 | |
| Ovens & King FL | Seniors | Bonnie Doon | 8.8 (56) | Bright | 6.2 (38) | 16 September 2023 | |
| Ovens & Murray FNL | Seniors | Yarrawonga | 11.10 (76) | Albury | 10.12 (72) | 24 September 2023 | |
| Picola & District FNL | Seniors | Waaia | 12.11 (83) | Strathmerton | 6.7 (43) | 9 September 2023 | |
| Riddell District FNL | Seniors | Diggers Rest | 16.9 (105) | Woodend-Hesket | 9.8 (62) | 17 September 2023 | |
| South West District FNL | Seniors | Coleraine | 9.7 (61) | Cavendish | 4.9 (33) | 9 September 2023 | |
| Southern FNL | Division 1 | Cheltenham | 7.17 (59) | Cranbourne | 8.8 (56) | 23 September 2023 | |
| Southern FNL | Division 2 | East Brighton | 13.14 (92) | Murrumbeena | 7.7 (49) | 16 September 2023 | |
| Southern FNL | Division 3 | Endeavour Hills | 13.16 (94) | Frankston | 11.11 (77) | 10 September 2023 | |
| Southern FNL | Division 4 | South Mornington | 15.9 (99) | Hampton | 12.7 (79) | 9 September 2023 | |
| Sunraysia FNL | Seniors | Irymple | 8.14 (62) | Robinvale Euston | 4.9 (33) | 9 September 2023 | |
| Tallangatta & District FL | Seniors | Chiltern | 10.9 (69) | Kiewa-Sandy Creek | 9.12 (66) | 16 September 2023 | |
| Upper Murray FNL | Seniors | Cudgewa | 22.14 (146) | Bullioh | 8.4 (52) | 26 August 2023 | |
| VAFA | Premier | Collegians | 19.16 (130) | St Kevin's | 6.9 (45) | 24 September 2023 | |
| VAFA | Premier B | St Bernard's | 15.13 (103) | Fitzroy | 10.12 (72) | 23 September 2023 | |
| VAFA | Premier C | Old Ivanhoe | 14.20 (104) | Old Camberwell | 9.8 (62) | 23 September 2023 | |
| VAFA | Division 1 | Glen Eira | 15.13 (103) | Oakleigh | 6.13 (49) | 16 September 2023 | |
| VAFA | Division 2 | Parkside | 10.8 (68) | Old Yarra Cobras | 10.5 (65) | 17 September 2023 | |
| VAFA | Division 3 | Elsternwick | 21.19 (145) | Hawthorn | 12.6 (78) | 16 September 2023 | |
| VAFA | Division 4 | North Brunswick | 10.9 (69) | Albert Park | 8.6 (54) | 17 September 2023 | |
| Warrnambool & District FNL | Seniors | Nirranda | 9.8 (62) | Merrivale | 6.5 (41) | 9 September 2023 | |
| West Gippsland FNC | Seniors | Inverloch-Kongwak | 10.5 (75) | Phillip Island | 6.4 (40) | 16 September 2023 | |
| Western Region FL | Division 1 | Werribee Districts | 9.11 (65) | Point Cook | 5.13 (43) | 17 September 2023 | |
| Western Region FL | Division 2 | Parkside | 8.13 (61) | Albion | 8.11 (59) | 10 September 2023 | |
| Western Region FL | Division 3 | Suns | 14.11 (95) | Albanvale | 14.9 (93) | 16 September 2023 | |
| Wimmera FNL | Seniors | Ararat | 10.13 (73) | Southern Mallee Giants | 6.16 (52) | 16 September 2023 | |
| Yarra Junior FL | Youth Boys 1 | Fitzroy | 10.5 (65) | Kew Comets | 5.8 (38) | 3 September 2023 | |
| Yarra Junior FL | Youth Boys 2 | Richmond | 5.14 (44) | Preston | 4.4 (28) | 3 September 2023 | |
| Yarra Junior FL | Youth Boys 3 | Surrey Park | 9.14 (68) | Banyule | 10.3 (63) | 3 September 2023 | |

==== Women's ====
| League | Division/ Grade | Premiers | | Runners-up | | Date | Ref |
| League | Division/ Grade | Club | Score | Club | Score | Date | Ref |
|---|---|---|---|---|---|---|---|
| AFL Barwon | Division 1 | Geelong Amateurs | 4.10 (34) | Grovedale | 2.1 (13) | 27 August 2023 | |
| AFL Barwon | Division 2 | Geelong West | 3.5 (23) | Thomson | 3.4 (22) | 27 August 2023 | |
| AFL Barwon | Division 3 | Modewarre | 6.0 (36) | North Geelong | 1.8 (14) | 27 August 2023 | |
| AFL North East Border | Open Women's | Lavington | 3.8 (26) | Wodonga Raiders | 4.1 (25) | 20 August 2023 | |
| Ballarat FNL | Seniors | Darley | 9.11 (65) | Redan | 2.3 (15) | 9 September 2023 | |
| Eastern FNL | Premier | Eastern Devils | 5.3 (33) | SBL Wolves Black | 4.6 (30) | 26 August 2023 | |
| Eastern FNL | Division 1 | Boronia | 3.8 (26) | The Basin Red | 3.3 (21) | 26 August 2023 | |
| Eastern FNL | Division 2 | East Ringwood | 12.15 (87) | Surrey Park | 3.1 (19) | 26 August 2023 | |
| Eastern FNL | Division 3 | Kilsyth | 8.2 (50) | Eastern Devils Black | 4.8 (32) | 26 August 2023 | |
| Eastern FNL | Division 4 | Mooroolbark | 7.12 (54) | Mitcham | 0.4 (4) | 26 August 2023 | |
| Essendon District FL | Premier | Oak Park | 3.8 (26) | Aberfeldie | 3.2 (20) | 19 August 2023 | |
| Essendon District FL | Division 1 | Essendon Doutta Stars | 7.6 (48) | Greenvale | 2.9 (21) | 19 August 2023 | |
| Essendon District FL | Division 2 | Airport West | 8.7 (55) | Aberfeldie 2 | 2.1 (13) | 19 August 2023 | |
| Northern FNL | Division 1 | Montmorency 1 | 6.13 (49) | Banyule | 3.3 (21) | 27 August 2023 | |
| Northern FNL | Division 2 | St Mary's | 6.8 (44) | Heidelberg | 5.3 (33) | 27 August 2023 | |
| Northern FNL | Division 3 | Wallan | 3.2 (20) | Darebin 2 | 2.1 (13) | 27 August 2023 | |
| Outer East FNL | Division 1 | Olinda-Ferny Creek | 9.6 (60) | Pakenham | 2.5 (17) | 13 August 2023 | |
| Outer East FNL | Division 2 | Belgrave | 2.9 (21) | Seville | 0.5 (5) | 13 August 2023 | |
| South Eastern Women's | Premier | Mornington | 5.13 (43) | Frankston | 3.2 (20) | 3 September 2023 | |
| South Eastern Women's | Division 2 | Pearcedale | 7.5 (47) | Mornington | 3.2 (20) | 3 September 2023 | |
| Southern FNL | Division 1 | Casey Thunder 1 | 9.6 (60) | Narre South Saints | 4.2 (26) | 27 August 2023 | |
| Southern FNL | Division 2 | East Brighton | 12.10 (82) | Lyndale | 1.1 (7) | 27 August 2023 | |
| VAFA Women's | Premier | St Kevin's | 6.9 (45) | Kew | 3.2 (20) | 17 September 2023 | |
| VAFA Women's | Premier B | Monash Blues | 3.3 (21) | Old Yarra Cobras | 3.1 (19) | 16 September 2023 | |
| VAFA Women's | Division 1 | Marcellin | 10.8 (68) | Beaumaris | 4.8 (32) | 3 September 2023 | |
| VAFA Women's | Division 2 | Williamstown CYMS | 10.9 (69) | Parkdale Vultures | 2.11 (23) | 3 September 2023 | |
| VAFA Women's | Division 3 | AJAX | 5.12 (42) | Power House | 2.3 (15) | 3 September 2023 | |
| VAFA Women's | Division 4 | UHS-VU | 4.2 (26) | Old Carey | 2.3 (15) | 2 September 2023 | |
| VFL Women's | Seniors | Port Melbourne | 5.5 (35) | Collingwood | 3.5 (23) | 30 July 2023 | |
| Western Region FL | Division 1 | Spotswood | 5.5 (35) | Caroline Springs | 5.4 (34) | 10 September 2023 | |
| Western Region FL | Division 2 | West Footscray | 6.7 (43) | Wyndhamvale | 6.5 (41) | 10 September 2023 | |
| Yarra Junior FL | Youth Girls 2 | St Mary's | 3.5 (23) | Warrandyte | 2.6 (18) | 20 August 2023 | |

== Clubs ==
=== Anniversaries ===
- Maldon Football Club (MCDFNL) − 150 years
- Port District Football Club (Adelaide FL) − 150 years
- St Kilda Football Club (AFL) − 150 years
- Mayne Australian Football Club (QFA) − 100 years

=== New clubs/reformed clubs ===
| Club | League | State | Ref. |
|---|---|---|---|
| Greater Springfield | Queensland FA | QLD | |
| Heatherhill | Southern FNL | VIC | |
| HMAS Stirling | Peel FL | WA | |
| Smithfield | Adelaide FL | SA | |
| Swan View | Hills FA | WA | |

=== Mergers ===
| Original clubs | New club | League | State | Date | Ref. |
|---|---|---|---|---|---|
| Maryborough Rovers | Maryborough Giants | Maryborough Castlemaine; District FL | VIC | 26 June 2023 | |
| Royal Park | Maryborough Giants | Maryborough Castlemaine; District FL | VIC | 26 June 2023 | |
| Balwyn-Greythorn | Balwyn | Yarra Junior FL | VIC | 5 October 2023 | |
| Boroondara | Balwyn | Yarra Junior FL | VIC | 5 October 2023 | |
| Southern Mallee Giants | Southern Mallee Thunder | Wimmera FL | VIC | 27 October 2023 | |
| Jeparit-Rainbow | Southern Mallee Thunder | Wimmera FL | VIC | 27 October 2023 | |
| Ironbank-Cherry Gardens | Ironbank-Cherry Gardens-Bridgewater | Hills FL | SA | | |
| Bridgewater Callington | Ironbank-Cherry Gardens-Bridgewater | Hills FL | SA | | |

=== Defunct clubs/clubs in recess ===
| Club | League | State | Ref. |
|---|---|---|---|
| Bayulu | Central Kimberley FL | WA | |
| Corowa-Rutherglen | Ovens & Murray FL | VIC | |
| Cerberus | Southern FNL | VIC | |
| Jacana | Essendon District FL | VIC | |
| Glen Orden | Western Region FL | VIC | |
| Glen Waverley Hawks | Eastern FNL | VIC | |
| Karnup-Serpentine | Metro FL | WA | |
| Muludja | Central Kimberley FL | WA | |
| Murdoch University | Metro FL | WA | |
| Nollamara | Perth FL | WA | |
| Noonkanbah | Central Kimberley FL | WA | |
| SBL Wolves | Eastern FNL | VIC | |
| Old Mentonians | VAFA | VIC | |
| Wallsend-West Newcastle | AFL Hunter Central Coast | NSW | |
| Wangkatjunka | Central Kimberley FL | WA | |
| Westbourne Grammarians | VAFA | VIC | |
| Yakanarra | Central Kimberley FL | WA | |

== Deaths ==
=== January ===
- 29 January – John Devine (82), former Geelong VFL player and coach

=== February ===
- 23 February – Jack Sheedy (96), former East Fremantle and East Perth WANFL player

=== April ===
- 22 April – Antonio Loiacono (20), Birdwood player who died during Hills Football League game

=== May ===
- 27 May – Dallas Keogh-Frankling (17), Castlemaine player who died during Bendigo Football Netball League game

=== June ===
- 27 June – Graeme John (80), former Australian Football League commissioner
- 28 June – Matt Rendell (64), former AFL and SANFL player and Fitzroy captain from 1985 to 1987

=== July ===
- 13 July – Alan Morrow (86), St Kilda 1966 VFL premiership and Dandenong 1967 VFA premiership player

=== August ===
- 3 August – Nick Lowden (23), Norwood 2022 SANFL premiership player
- 22 August – Austin Robertson Jr. (80), former South Melbourne VFL and Subiaco WANFL player

=== September ===
- 1 September – Ken Bennett (83), Collingwood 1958 VFL premiership player
- 16 September – Kevin Neale (78), St Kilda 1966 VFL premiership player
- 16 September – Ron Barassi (87), former VFL/AFL player and coach across four clubs, Hall of Fame "Legend"
- 26 September – Geof Motley (88), former Port Adelaide SANFL captain and coach

=== November ===
- 20 November – Ted Hopkins (74), Carlton 1970 VFL premiership player
