= Queensland Football Association =

Australian rules football league

- Most recent season or competition: 2024 AFL Queensland season
- Formerly: List: South Queensland Australian Football Association (SQAFA) (1969–92); AFL South Queensland (AFLSQ) (2000-2005); Queensland State Association (QSA) (2006-2011); South East Queensland AFL (SEQAFL) (2012-2013); Queensland Football Association (QFA) / Queensland Amateur Football Association (QAFA) (2014-2017); Queensland Football Association (QFA) (2018–)
- Governing body: AFL Queensland
- Founded: 1969; 57 years ago
- First season: 1969
- No. of teams: 52
- States: Queensland; New South Wales
- Regions: South East Queensland; Northern Rivers
- Current premiers (2025): Mayne
- Most premierships: Sherwood (13)
- Official website: aflq.com.au

The Queensland Football Association (QFA) is the largest Australian rules football league in Queensland and second largest in the world by number of senior clubs (after the Victorian Amateur Football Association). Dating back to 1969 and going by various names it is now run by AFL Queensland as a second tier competition under its semi-professional Queensland Australian Football League (QAFL). There are 52 clubs spanning as far north as Gympie in Queensland to as far south as Ballina in New South Wales (NSW). Most clubs field men's and women's senior and reserve sides in the top divisions, with senior only teams in the lower divisions. The men's competition is known as the QFA and the women's is known as the QFAW.

The current competition is the result of merging Gold Coast and Sunshine Coast leagues with existing Brisbane leagues in the 1990s along with the addition of New South Wales clubs in the 2010s after numerous attempts to restructure QFA (Northern Rivers) and AFL North Coast (NSW) competitions. Successive restructuring has seen the number of teams balloon resulting in numerous divisions. The QFA covers more municipalities than any other competition in Queensland including Gympie Region, Shire of Noosa, Sunshine Coast Region, City of Moreton Bay, Somerset Region, Brisbane City Council, Gold Coast City Council, Redland City and Ipswich City Council with a combined population of almost 4 million. Due to the enormous distances between clubs for a mostly amateur competition, which can reach 350 kilometres placing significant stress on clubs, the league restructured in 2021 into North/South sub-divisions.

It is one of the few Australian rules football leagues that operates a promotion and relegation system. AFL Queensland considers the QFA to be a development league for clubs to prove that they are sufficiently stable and successful to apply for a QAFL license. The most recent examples of QFA Division 1 clubs entering the QAFL are Redland-Victoria Point in 2021, Noosa Tigers in 2022, and Coorparoo Kings for 2025.

Traditionally an amateur competition, amateur status was enforced between 2014 and 2017 when it split off the Queensland Amateur Football Association (QAFA) competition. However with increasing professionalism in the QAFL and clubs seeking promotion, AFL Queensland accommodated for player payments in 2020 and it is now not uncommon for QFA Division 1 clubs to sign big name players. This has made it more difficult for truly amateur clubs to compete and get promoted from the lower divisions.

== History ==
In 1969, the "South Queensland Australian Football Association" (SQAFA) was established with the purpose of developing players for the Queensland Australian Football League (QAFL). Most of the players were amateurs. In 1992, the league changed its name to the "Brisbane Australian Football League" (BAFL) and included clubs from the Sunshine Coast.

Another name change in 2000 brought about AFL South Queensland. In 2006, AFL South Queensland was taken under the umbrella of AFL Queensland and rebranded as the Queensland State Association. In 2012, it was renamed South East Queensland AFL. Finally in 2014 the local level was divided into two leagues, the Queensland Football Association (QFA) and the Queensland Amateur Football Association (QAFA). Again in 2017 the name will change again to the Queensland Football Association, now covering five divisions and the re-introduction of two regional based leagues (AFL Northern Rivers & AFL Sunshine Coast / Wide Bay).

== Competition structure ==
2017 to 2019:

Queensland Football Association (QFA) league system
Level	Leagues	N° of teams (Reserves)	N° of teams (Seniors)	↑ Promotion	↓ Relegation
1	QFA Division 1	9	9	0	1 ^{**}
2	QFA Division 2	9	9	1 ^{*}	1 ^{**}
3	QFA Division 3	10	10	1 ^{*}	0
4	QFA Division 4		9	0	1 ^{**}
5	QFA Division 5		9	1 ^{*}	0

Notes

^{*} Premiers
^{**} Wooden spooners

2020 to 2024:

Level	Leagues	
1	QFA Division 1; 8 clubs	
2	QFA Division 2 North; 12 clubs	QFA Division 2 South; 8 clubs
3	QFA Division 3 North; 7 clubs	QFA Division 3 South; 7 clubs
4	QFA Division 4 North; 9 clubs	QFA Division 4 North; 11 clubs

2025 to present:

Level	Leagues			
1	QFA Division 1; 7 clubs			
2	QFA Division 2 North		QFA Division 2 South	
3	QFA Division 3 Sunshine Coast	QFA Division 3 Brisbane North	QFA Division 3 Brisbane South	QFA Division 3 Gold Coast

== Queensland Football Association clubs ==
Some clubs are listed multiple times as they field teams in multiple grades and divisions.

=== Club Locations ===
Red pogs - Division 1 clubs

Blue pogs - Division 2 clubs

Yellow pogs - Division 3 clubs

Club locations - Brisbane	Club locations - Sunshine Coast
Club locations - Gold Coast
Tweed Coast are based in Bogangar, 17km south of Tweed Heads

=== Division 1 ===
Club	Colours	Nickname	Home Ground	Former league	Est.	Years in QFA	QFA senior premierships	
Club	Colours	Nickname	Home Ground	Former league	Est.	Years in QFA	Total	Most recent
Caloundra		Panthers	Carter Park, Golden Beach	SCAFL	1973	1993-	5	2025*
Hinterland (Nambour 1993-97, Nambour & Hinterland 2008-16)		Blues	G Rae Oval, Palmwoods	SCAFL	1970	1993-1997, 2008-	5	2022
Mayne		Tigers	Enoggera Memorial Park, Enoggera	QAFL	1924	2005-	6	2025
Moreton Bay (Caboolture 1992-2014)		Lions	Moreton Bay Regional Sports Park, Burpengary	SCAFL	1987	1991-	4	2021
Sandgate		Hawks	Taigum Place Park, Taigum	QAFL	1943	1992-	3	2024
Springwood		Pumas	Lowe Oval, Underwood	–	1972	1979-	7	2023
University of Queensland		Red Lions	University of Queensland Playing Field 2, St Lucia	QAFL	1956	1969-	3	2024*

*won by a side in a different division

==== Promotions/relegations ====
Year	Club promoted to division	Notes
2017	Bond University	Promoted from QFA South in 2016; Relegated to QFA Division 2 in 2017
2017	Burleigh	Promoted from QFA South in 2016; Relegated to QFA Division 2 South in 2019
2017	Caloundra	Promoted from QFA North in 2016
2017	Coorparoo	Promoted from QFA South in 2016; Promoted to QAFL in 2024
2017	Maroochydore	Promoted from QFA North in 2016; Promoted to QAFL in 2019
2017	Mayne	Promoted from QFA North in 2016
2017	Noosa	Promoted from QFA North in 2016; Promoted to QAFL in 2020
2017	Springwood	Promoted from QFA South in 2016
2017	University of Queensland	Relegated from QAFL in 2016
2017	Yeronga South Brisbane	Promoted from QFA South in 2016; Relegated to QFA Division 2 in 2018
2018	Aspley (Reserves)	Promoted from QFA Division 2 in 2017; Promoted to QAFL Reserves in 2021
2020	Beenleigh	Promoted from QFA Division 2 in 2019; Relegated to QFA Division 2 South in 2024
2022	Moreton Bay	Promoted from QFA Division 2 North in 2021
2022	Wynnum	Promoted from QFA Division 2 North in 2021; Relegated to QFA Division 2 North in 2022
2023	Hinterland	Promoted from QFA Division 2 North in 2022
2025	Sandgate	Promoted from QFA Division 2 North in 2024

=== Division 2 North ===
Club	Colours	Nickname	Home Ground	Former league	Est.	Years in QFA	QFA senior premierships	
Club	Colours	Nickname	Home Ground	Former league	Est.	Years in QFA	Total	Most recent
Alexandra Hills (Capalaba 1980-91)		Bombers	Keith Surridge Park, Alexandra Hills	–	1980	1980-	3	2023
Gympie		Cats	Ray Warren Oval, Glanmire	SCAFL	1971	2000-2003, 2007-	4	2015
Jindalee		Jags	Jindalee Recreation Reserve, Jindalee	–	1971	1980-1987, 2017-	1	1986
Kedron		Lions	EK (Ted) Anderson Oval, Kedron	QAFL	1937	2006-	2	2015
Kenmore		Bears	Chelmer Oval, Chelmer	–	1967	1997-	5	2020
Logan City (Park Ridge 2013-24)		Pirates	Park Ridge High School, Park Ridge	–	2013	2013-	2	2019
Moorooka (Griffith Moorooka 2009-17)		Roosters	Alexander Park, Moorooka	–	1968	1974-2001, 2009-	4	2025
Pine Rivers (Strathpine 1970-2009)		Swans	Rob Akers Reserve, Strathpine	–	1970	1970-	5	2012
Redcliffe		Tigers	Nathan Road Sports Complex, Kippa-Ring	–	1974	1974-	6	2025
Wynnum		Vikings	Kianawah Oval, Wynnum West	–	1971	1971-	4	2009
Yeronga South Brisbane (South Brisbane 1970-90, Yeronga 1991-2009)		Devils	Leyshon Park, Yeronga	QAFL	1929	1970-	3	2018
Zillmere		Eagles	O'Callaghan Park, Zillmere	QAFL	1923	2013-	3	2017

=== Division 2 South ===
Club	Colours	Nickname	Home Ground	Former league	Est.	Years in QFA	QFA senior premierships	
Club	Colours	Nickname	Home Ground	Former league	Est.	Years in QFA	Total	Most recent
Bond University		Bullsharks	Bond University Oval, Robina	–	2011	2011-	4	2025
Burleigh		Bombers	Bill Godfrey Oval, Burleigh Waters	QAFL	c. 1979	2000-	5	2023
Carrara		Saints	Alan Nielsen Oval, Carrara	–	1998	2012-	1	2018
Coolangatta Tweed Heads		Blues	EXIMM Oval, Coolangatta	QAFL	1962	2000-	4	2024
Coomera		Magpies	Coomera Sports Park, Coomera	–	1997	2009-	1	2013
Pacific Pines		Power	McAuley Parade Oval, Pacific Pines	–	2005	2005	3	2025
Robina Mudgeeraba (Robina 2000-22)		Roos	Scottsdale Reserve, Robina	QAFL	1996	2000-	3	2010
Tweed Coast		Tigers	Barry Sheppard Oval, Bogangar, New South Wales	SAFL	2009	2012-	3	2015

=== Division 3 Sunshine Coast ===
Club	Colours	Nickname	Home Ground	Former league	Est.	Years in QFA	QFA senior premierships	
Club	Colours	Nickname	Home Ground	Former league	Est.	Years in QFA	Total	Most recent
Caloundra thirds		Panthers	Carter Park, Golden Beach	–	1973	1993-	5	2025
Glasshouse Hinterland		Lions	Landsborough Sport & Recreation Centre, Landsborough	–	1997	2001-	0	-
Kawana Park		Eagles	Meridan Fields Sports Complex, Meridan Plains	–	2001	2025-	0	-
Maroochydore thirds		Roos	Neil Upton Oval, Maroochydore	–	1969	1992-1996, 2007-	8	2023
North Shore		Jets	North Shore Multisports Complex, Mudjimba	–	1999	1999-	0	-
Pomona		Demons	Reserve Street Oval, Pomona	SCAFL, WBAFL	1973	1997-2003, 2007-2017, 2026-	2	2013

=== Division 3 Brisbane North ===
Club	Colours	Nickname	Home Ground	Former league	Est.	Years in QFA	QFA senior premierships	
Club	Colours	Nickname	Home Ground	Former league	Est.	Years in QFA	Total	Most recent
Aspley thirds		Hornets	Graham Road, Carseldine	–	1964	1970-	10	2017
Coorparoo fourths (Treasury Kings 1996-98) (Note: Established in 1996, one year after the original Coorparoo FC folded.)		Kings	Giffin Park, Coorparoo	–	1996	1996-	8	2024
Ferny Grove		Falcons	Ferny Grove Oval, Ferny Grove	–	1991	2015-	0	-
Kedron thirds		Lions	EK (Ted) Anderson Oval, Kedron	–	1937	2006-	2	2015
Marcellin Old Collegians		Eagles	Hickey Park, Stafford	–	2017	2017-	1	2025
Mayne thirds		Tigers	Enoggera Memorial Park, Enoggera	–	1924	2005-	6	2025*
Narangba		Crows	Findlay Street Sportsfields, Burpengary	–	2003	2025-	0	-
Redcliffe thirds		Tigers	Nathan Road Sports Complex, Kippa-Ring	–	1974	1974-	6	2025*
Sandgate thirds		Hawks	Taigum Place Park, Taigum	–	1943	1992-	3	2024
University of Queensland		Red Lions	University of Queensland Playing Field 2, St Lucia	QAFL	1956	1969-	3	2024*

*won by a side in a different division

=== Division 3 Brisbane South ===
Club	Colours	Nickname	Home Ground	Former league	Est.	Years in QFA	QFA senior premierships	
Club	Colours	Nickname	Home Ground	Former league	Est.	Years in QFA	Total	Most recent
Alexandra Hills thirds		Bombers	Keith Surridge Park, Alexandra Hills	–	1980	1980-	3	2023
Beenleigh		Buffaloes	Guardian Gantry Hire Oval, Dauth Park, Beenleigh	–	1998	1998-	1	2009
Collingwood Park		Power	Redbank Plains Recreational Reserve, Redbank Plains	–	1980s	2010-	1	2021
Coorparoo thirds (Treasury Kings 1996-98) (Note: Established in 1996, one year after the original Coorparoo FC folded.)		Kings	Giffin Park, Coorparoo	–	1996	1996-	8	2024
Ipswich (RAAF 1972-2000)		Eagles	Limestone Park, Ipswich	–	1966	1972-	2	1979
Jimboomba (Southern Redbacks 2000-09)		Redbacks	Glenlogan Park, Glenlogan	–	2000	2000-	2	2011
Jindalee thirds		Jags	Jindalee Recreation Reserve, Jindalee	–	1971	1980-1987, 2017-	1	1986
Mount Gravatt thirds		Vultures	Dittmer Park, Mount Gravatt	–	1964	1970-	6	2023
Redland-Victoria Point thirds		Sharks	Totally Workwear Park, Victoria Point	–	2014	2014-	1	2017
UQ Bulldogs (Partnered with Wests Juniors)		Bulldogs	University of Queensland Playing Field 2, St Lucia and Oakman Park, Taringa	–	1956	1969-	3	2024
Sherwood thirds		Magpies	Powenyenna Oval, Chelmer	–	1991	2004-	8	2022
Yeronga South Brisbane thirds		Devils	Leyshon Park, Yeronga	–	1929	1970-	3	2018

=== Division 3 Gold Coast ===
Club	Colours	Nickname	Home Ground	Former league	Est.	Years in QFA	QFA senior premierships	
Club	Colours	Nickname	Home Ground	Former league	Est.	Years in QFA	Total	Most recent
Broadbeach thirds		Cats	Subaru Oval, Mermaid Waters	–	1971	2026–	0	–
Burleigh thirds		Bombers	Bill Godfrey Oval, Burleigh Waters	–	c. 1979 (Note: The club website indicates that its first president was appointed in 1979, with no more data about its foundation.)	2000-	5	2023
Coolangatta Tweed Heads thirds		Blues	EXIMM Oval, Coolangatta	–	1962	2000-	4	2024
Coomera thirds		Magpies	Coomera Sports Park, Coomera	–	1997	2009-	1	2013
Labrador thirds		Tigers	Cooke-Murphy Oval, Labrador	–	1964	2022-	0	-
Ormeau		Bulldogs	Ormeau Sports Park, Kingsholme	–	2008	2008-	1	2020
Southport thirds		Sharks	Fankhauser Reserve, Southport	–	1961	2024-	1	2024
Surfers Paradise thirds		Demons	Sir Bruce Small Park, Benowa	–	1962	2026–	0	–

== Former clubs ==
Club	Colours	Nickname	Home Ground	Former league	Est.	Years in QFA	QFA senior premierships		Fate
Club	Colours	Nickname	Home Ground	Former league	Est.	Years in QFA	Total	Most recent	Fate
Acacia Ridge	(1972-?)(?-1986)	Kookaburras	Mortimer Road Park, Acacia Ridge	–	1972	1972-1986	1	1984	Folded after 1986 season
Army		Reds	Enoggera Military Barracks Oval, Enoggera	QAFL	1950s	1970-1975	0	-	Folded after 1975 season
Ashgrove (Oakleigh 1970-81)		Dragons	Ashgrove Sports Ground, Ashgrove	QAFL	1969	1970-1987	2	1983	Folded after 1987 season
Ballina		Bombers	Fripp Oval, Ballina	SAFL	1984	2012-2023	0	-	Senior men's team merged with Byron to form Southern Stingrays in 2024. Re-formed in Northern Rivers Cup in 2025
Banyo		Bloods	Nudgee Recreation Reserve, Nudgee	QAFL	1967	1970-1993	4	1982	Folded after 1993 season
Bribie Island		Bulldogs	Bribie Island Recreation Reserve, Bongaree	SCAFL	1985	1995-2023	2	2019	Seniors in recess since 2023 season
Brisbane Valley		Rattlers	Fernvale Sports Park, Fernvale	–	2016	2022-2024	0	-	Seniors in recess since 2024 season
Byron		Magpies	Cavanbah Centre, Byron Bay	SAFL	1984	2012-2022	4	2019	Moved to AFL North Coast in 2023
Calamvale		Leopards	Calamvale Sportsfield, Calamvale	–	2011	2011-2013	0	-	Seniors folded after 2013 season, still field junior teams
Centenary		Jaguars	CJ Greenfield Park, Richlands	–	1988	1988-1996	0	-	Folded after 1996 season
Deagon		Dodgers	Taigum Place Park, Taigum	–	1970	1970-1978	3	1978	Folded after 1978 season
Everton (Stafford 1971-75)	(1971-75)(1976-90)	Wolves	Enoggera Memorial Park, Enoggera	–	1971	1971-1990	5	1990	Folded after 1990 season
Forest Lake		Dragons		–	1999	1999	0	-	Folded after 1999 season
Geebung		Giants	No home ground	–	1971	1971-1973	0	-	Folded after 1973 season
Greater Springfield	(2023-24)(2025)	Storm	Springfield Central Sports complex, Springfield Central	–	2022	2023-2025	0	-	Seniors in recess since 2025 season
Griffith University		Gladiators	Griffith University Nathan Fields, Nathan	–	2002	2002-2009	0	-	Merged with Moorooka to form Griffith-Moorooka in 2010
Hemmant		Gold Tops	Hemmant Recreation Reserve, Hemmant	–	1971	1971-1980	0	-	Folded after 1980 season
Inala		Lorikeets	CJ Greenfield Park, Richlands	–	1971	1971-1986	0	-	Folded after 1986 season
Ipswich	(1970-94)(2015-25)	Cats	Ivor Marsden Memorial Sports Centre, Amberley	GCAFL	1959	1970-1994, 2015-2025	3	1993	Recess between 1995-2014. Folded after 2025 season
Lismore		Swans	Gloria Mortimer Oval, Lismore	SAFL	2002	2012-2020	0	-	Moved to AFL North Coast in 2021
Lockyer Valley		Magpies	Cahill Park, Gatton	DDAFL	1981	1995	0	-	Returned to Darling Downs AFL in 1996
Marsden		Hawks	Mudgee Street Park, Marsden	–	1987	1987-2001	2	1995	Folded after 2001 season
Morningside thirds		Panthers	Jack Esplen Oval, Hawthorne	–	1947	2016-2023	1	2020	Disbanded after 2023 season
Murri		Mavericks	Melrose Park, Kalinga	–	1998	1998-?	0	-	Merged with Ferny Grove
Noosa	(1993-?)(?-2020)	Tigers	Noosa Oval, Noosaville	SCAFL	1970	1993-2020	5	2020	Moved to QAFL in 2021
Palm Beach Currumbin		Lions	Salk Oval, Palm Beach	GCAFL	1961	2000-2013	3	2009	Moved to QAFL in 2014
Redland (Victoria Point-Redlands 1970-72)	(1971-?)(1970s-80s)(1980s-?)	Sharks	Totally Workwear Park, Victoria Point	–	1966	1970-1999	5	1999	Moved to QAFL in 2000
Sherwood		Magpies	Chelmer Oval, Chelmer	QAFL	1956	1970-1982	10	1982	Moved to QAFL in 1983
South East Suns	(1973-76)(1977-2014)(2015-16)	Suns	Tansey Park, Tanah Merah	GCAFL	1973	1973-1985, 1991-2016	4	2016	Played in Gold Coast AFL between 1986-1990. Folded after 2016 season
Southern Stingrays		Stingrays	Cavanbah Centre, Byron Bay and Fripp Oval, Ballina	–	2024	2024	0	-	Folded/de-merged into Byron and Ballina after 2024 season
Surfers Paradise		Demons	Sir Bruce Small Park, Benowa	GCAFL	1962	2000-2013	0	-	Moved to QAFL in 2014
Teachers		Headmasters, Caners	QUT Kelvin Grove Campus, Kelvin Grove	QAFL	1964	1970-1975	0	-	Merged with Oakleigh after 1975 season
Toowoomba University		Cougars	Baker St Oval, Darling Heights	DDAFL	1976	1999-2002	0	-	Returned to Darling Downs AFL in 2003
Toowong							1	1996	?
Wilston Grange		Gorillas	Hickey Park, Stafford	QAFL	1945	1995-2013	2	2002	Moved to QAFL in 2014

== Premiers: 1970–present ==
Year	SQAFA Division 1	SQAFA Division 2	SQAFA Division 3				
1970	Sherwood	Deagon	?				
1971	Mt Gravatt	University Queensland	Stafford				
1972	Mt Gravatt	Banyo	Mt Gravatt				
1973	Sherwood	Banyo	Stafford				
1974	Mt Gravatt	Wynnum	Aspley				
1975	Sherwood	Banyo	Redland				
1976	Sherwood	RAAF	Deagon				
1977	Sherwood	Deagon	Beenleigh-Slacks				
1978	Sherwood	Oakleigh	Everton				
1979	Sherwood	Ipswich	RAAF				
1980	Sherwood	Beenleigh	(No competition)				
1981	Sherwood	Everton	(No competition)				
1982	Sherwood	Banyo	(No competition)				
1983	Mt Gravatt	Ashgrove	(No competition)				
1984	Acacia Ridge	University Queensland	(No competition)				
1985	Aspley	Beenleigh	(No competition)				
1986	Aspley	Jindalee	(No competition)				
1987	Aspley	Redland	(No competition)				
1988	Aspley	Redcliffe	(No competition)				
1989	Aspley	Springwood	(No competition)				
1990	Aspley	Everton	(No competition)				
1991	Strathpine	Ipswich	(No competition)				
Year	BAFL Division 1	BAFL Division 2	BAFL Division 3				
1992	Aspley	Moorooka	Uni				
1993	Maroochydore	Sandgate	Ipswich				
1994	Maroochydore	Sandgate	Marsden				
1995	Maroochydore	Alexandra Hills	Marsden				
1996	Maroochydore	Alexandra Hills	Toowong				
1997	Noosa	Wilston Grange	Kenmore				
1998	Redland	Moorooka	Kenmore				
1999	Redland	Caboolture	Redland				
Year	AFLSQ Premier Division	AFLSQ Division 1	AFLSQ Division 2	AFLSQ Division 3	AFLSQ Division 4		
2000	Palm Beach-Currumbin	Coorparoo Kings	Gympie	?	?		
2001	Coolangatta	Burleigh Heads	Coorparoo Kings	Gympie	?		
2002	Aspley	Springwood	Redcliffe	Kenmore	Wilston Grange		
2003	Coolangatta	Strathpine	Wynnum	(No competition)	?		
2004	Burleigh	Strathpine	Robina	(No competition)	?		
2005	Burleigh	Redcliffe	Robina	(No competition)	?		
Year	AFLQ State League Div 2	AFLQ State Assoc'n Div 1	AFLQ State Assoc'n Div 2	AFLQ State Assoc'n Div 3 North	AFLQ State Assoc'n Div 3 Central		
2006	Western Magpies	Yeronga	Kenmore	(No competition)	?		
2007	Palm Beach-Currumbin	Yeronga	Kedron	Gympie	Western Magpies		
2008	Western Magpies	Wynnum	Redcliffe	Nambour	Strathpine		
2009	Palm Beach-Currumbin	Wynnum	Beenleigh	Nambour	Woodsmen		
2010	Noosa	Caloundra	Robina	Nambour & Hinterland	Jimboomba		
2011	Noosa	Coorparoo Kings	Nambour & Hinterland	Pomona	Jimboomba		
Year	SEQAFL Division 1	SEQAFL Division 2	SEQAFL Division 3	SEQAFL Division 4 North	SEQAFL Division 4 Central	SEQAFL Division 4 South	
2012	Western Magpies	Coorparoo Kings	Redcliffe	Caloundra	Pine Rivers	Tweed Coast	
2013	Springwood	Coorparoo Kings	Coomera	Pomona	Zillmere	Tweed Coast	
Year	QFA North	QFA South	QAFA A Grade	QAFA B Grade North	QAFA B Grade Central	QAFA B Grade South	
2014	Mayne	Springwood	Griffith Uni/Moorooka	Bribie Island	Woodsmen	Bond Uni	
2015	Mayne	Springwood	Bond Uni	Gympie	Kedron	Tweed Coast	
2016	Mayne	Coorparoo Kings	Southeast Suns	Maroochydore	Zillmere	Byron Magpies	
Year	QFA Division 1	QFA Division 2	QFA Division 3	QFA Division 4	QFA Division 5	QFA Northern Rivers	
2017	Maroochydore	Aspley Hornets	Victoria Point	Zillmere	Mayne	Byron Magpies	
2018	Maroochydore	Park Ridge	Carrara	Maroochydore	Yeronga South Brisbane	Byron Magpies	
2019	Noosa	Bond University	Moreton Bay	Park Ridge	Bribie Island	Byron Magpies	
Year	QFA Division 1	QFA Division 2 North	QFA Division 2 South	QFA Division 3	QFA Division 4		
2020	Noosa	Moreton Bay	Kenmore	Morningside	Ormeau		
2021	Springwood	Moreton Bay	Burleigh	Sherwood Districts	Collingwood Park		
2022	Coorparoo	Hinterland Blues	Coolangatta-Tweed Heads	Sherwood	Pacific Pines		
Year	QFA Division 1	QFA Division 2 North	QFA Division 2 South	QFA Division 3 North	QFA Division 3 South	QFA Division 4 North	QFA Division 4 South
2023	Springwood	Alexandra Hills	Burleigh	Maroochydore	Pacific Pines	Caloundra	Mt Gravatt
2024	Mayne	Sandgate	Coolangatta-Tweed Heads	Caloundra	Coorparoo	University of QLD	Southport
Year	QFA Division 1	QFA Division 2 North	QFA Division 2 South	QFA Division 3 Sunshine Coast	QFA Division 3 Brisbane North	QFA Division 3 Brisbane South	QFA Division 3 Gold Coast
2025	Mayne	Redcliffe	Bond University	Caloundra	Marcellin Old Collegians	Moorooka	Pacific Pines
2026		Redcliffe		Maroochydore	Coorparoo		

== Premierships by club ==
=== Men's seniors ===
Club	Seniors					
Club	Division 1 (1st Tier)	Division 2 (2nd Tier)	Division 3 (3rd Tier)	Division 4 (4th Tier) Inactive	Division 5 (5th Tier) Inactive	Total
Acacia Ridge	1	0	0	0	0	1
Alexandra Hills	0	3	0	0	0	3
Ashgrove	0	2	0	0	0	2
Aspley	8	1	1	0	0	10
Banyo	0	4	0	0	0	4
Beenleigh	0	0	1	0	0	1
Bond University	0	3	1	0	0	4
Bribie Island	0	0	1	0	1	2
Burleigh	2	3	0	0	0	5
Byron	0	0	1	0	0	1
Caloundra	0	1	2	2	0	5
Carrara	0	0	1	0	0	1
Collingwood Park	0	0	0	1	0	1
Coolangatta-Tweed Heads	2	2	0	0	0	4
Coomera	0	0	1	0	0	1
Coorparoo	2	4	3	0	0	9
Deagon	0	2	1	0	0	3
Everton	0	2	1	0	0	3
Gympie	0	0	2	2	0	4
Hinterland	0	1	1	3	0	5
Ipswich Cats	0	2	1	0	0	3
Ipswich Eagles	0	1	1	0	0	2
Jimboomba	0	0	0	2	0	2
Jindalee	0	1	0	0	0	1
Kedron	0	0	2	0	0	2
Kenmore	0	1	3	1	0	5
Marcellin Old Collegians	0	0	1	0	0	1
Maroochydore	5	0	3	1	0	9
Marsden	0	0	2	0	0	2
Mayne	5	0	0	0	1	6
Moorooka	0	3	1	0	0	4
Moreton Bay	0	3	1	0	0	4
Morningside	0	0	1	0	0	1
Mount Gravatt	4	0	1	1	0	6
Noosa	5	0	0	0	0	5
Ormeau	0	0	0	1	0	1
Pacific Pines	0	0	2	1	0	3
Palm Beach-Currumbin	3	0	0	0	0	3
Park Ridge	0	1	0	1	0	2
Pine Rivers	1	2	0	2	0	5
Pomona	0	0	0	2	0	2
Redcliffe	0	4	3	0	0	7
Robina	0	0	3	0	0	3
Sandgate	0	3	0	0	0	3
Sherwood	13	0	3	2	0	18
South East Suns	0	3	1	0	0	4
Southport	0	0	0	1	0	1
Springwood	5	2	0	0	0	7
Toowong	0	0	1	0	0	1
Tweed Coast	0	0	1	2	0	3
University of Queensland	0	2	1	1	0	4
Victoria Point-Redland	2	1	3	0	0	6
Wilston Grange	0	1	2	0	1	4
Wynnum	0	3	1	0	0	4
Yeronga South Brisbane	0	2	0	0	1	3
Zillmere	0	0	1	2	0	3

== Recent Grand Finals ==
GF	Premiership decided by a grand final where a challenge was not needed
GF (R)	Premiership decided by a grand final replay, after the scheduled grand final was drawn
CF	Premiership decided by a challenge final under the Argus system
GF (N)	Premiership decided by a grand final because no team finished outright first after full season win–loss record
W/L	Premiership decided by full season win–loss record
NF	No grand final held

=== QFA Division 1 ===
Year	Premiers	Runners-up	Score	Venue	Suburb	Date	Report
2017	Maroochydore	Noosa	16.12 (108) - 13.9 (87)	Leyshon Park	Yeronga	16 September 2017	
2018	Maroochydore	Noosa	11.18 (84) - 12.11 (83)	Leyshon Park	Yeronga	15 September 2018	
2019	Noosa	Maroochydore	14.8 (92) - 7.7 (49)	Leyshon Park	Yeronga	31 August 2019	
2020	Noosa	Mayne	14.15 (99) - 6.8 (44)	Moreton Bay Central Sports Complex	Burpengary	27 September 2020	
2021	Springwood	Caloundra	12.14 (86) - 5.8 (38)	Hickey Park	Stafford	11 September 2021	
2022	Coorparoo	Beenleigh	13.13 (91) - 6.16 (52)	Leyshon Park	Yeronga	3 September 2022	
2023	Springwood	Coorparoo	12.9 (81) - 10.9 (69)	E.K. Ted Anderson Oval	Kedron	2 September 2023	
2024	Mayne	Coorparoo	13.8 (86) - 8.9 (57)	South Pine Sports Complex	Brendale	31 August 2024	
2025	Mayne	Springwood	15.10 (100) - 13.9 (87)	Hickey Park	Stafford	13 September 2025	
2026				Hickey Park	Stafford	12 September 2026	

=== QFA Division 2 North ===
Year	Premiers	Runners-up	Score	Venue	Suburb	Date	Report
2020	Moreton Bay	Pine Rivers	11.10 (76) - 9.7 (61)	Taigum Place Park	Taigum	26 September 2020	
2021	Moreton Bay	Hinterland	11.9 (75) - 7.8 (50)	Taigum Place Park	Taigum	4 September 2021	
2022	Hinterland	Alexandra Hills	16.7 (103) - 10.6 (66)	Hickey Park	Stafford	10 September 2022	
2023	Alexandra Hills	Kenmore	7.7 (49) - 5.10 (40)	Moreton Bay Central Sports Complex	Burpengary	10 September 2023	
2024	Sandgate	Alexandra Hills	8.7 (55) - 8.3 (51)	Moreton Bay Central Sports Complex	Burpengary	7 September 2024	
2025	Redcliffe	Kenmore	8.12 (60) - 6.5 (41)	Taigum Place Park	Taigum	14 September 2025	
2026	Redcliffe	Kedron	13.11 (89) - 6.3 (39)	Taigum Place Park	Taigum	5 September 2026	

=== QFA Division 2 South ===
Year	Premiers	Runners-up	Score	Venue	Suburb	Date	Report
2020	Kenmore	Victoria Point	11.6 (72) - 6.13 (49)	Dauth Park	Beenleigh	19 September 2020	
2021	Burleigh	Bond University	12.12 (84) - 7.9 (51)	Sir Bruce Small Park	Benowa	12 September 2021	
2022	Coolangatta Tweed	Carrara	12.12 (84) - 7.8 (50)	Sir Bruce Small Park	Benowa	11 September 2022	
2023	Burleigh	Bond University	15.6 (96) - 8.8 (56)	Fankhauser Reserve	Southport	9 September 2023	
2024	Coolangatta Tweed	Burleigh	9.15 (69) - 8.8 (56)	Kombumerri Park	Mermaid Waters	8 September 2024	
2025	Bond University	Coolangatta Tweed	7.13 (55) - 6.7 (43)	Kombumerri Park	Mermaid Waters	6 September 2025	
2026				Cooke Murphy Oval	Labrador	13 September 2026	

=== QFA Division 3 Sunshine Coast ===
Year	Premiers	Runners-up	Score	Venue	Suburb	Date	Report
2025	Caloundra	Maroochydore	8.10 (58) - 7.6 (48)	Meridan Fields Sports Complex	Meridan Plains	12 September 2025	
2026	Maroochydore	Kawana Park	10.16 (76) - 7.11 (53)	G Rae Oval	Palmwoods	4 September 2026	

=== QFA Division 3 Brisbane North ===
Year	Premiers	Runners-up	Score	Venue	Suburb	Date	Report							
2025	Marcellin Old Collegians	Kedron	5.6 (36) - 1.7 (13)	Hickey Park	Stafford	12 September 2025		2025	Marcellin Old Collegians	Kedron	5.6 (36) - 1.7 (13)	Hickey Park	Stafford	12 September 2025

=== QFA Division 3 Brisbane South ===
Year	Premiers	Runners-up	Score	Venue	Suburb	Date	Report
2025	Moorooka	Coorparoo	7.11 (53) - 7.9 (51)	Everleigh Sports Park	Greenbank	5 September 2025	

=== QFA Division 3 Gold Coast ===
Year	Premiers	Runners-up	Score	Venue	Suburb	Date	Report
2025	Pacific Pines	Southport	13.7 (85) - 6.6 (42)	Kombumerri Park	Mermaid Waters	5 September 2025	

== See also ==
- Australian Rules football in Queensland
