= Collingwood Park =

Collingwood Park may refer to:

== Australia ==
- Collingwood Park, Queensland, a suburb in Ipswich
  - Collingwood Park Australian Football Club, a football club in Ipswich
- Collingwood Park, Western Australia, a suburb in Albany
  - Collingwood Park (stadium), in Albany

== United States ==
- Collingwood Park, New Jersey, United States
