= Len Peak Oval =

Australian rules football venue in Gold Coast, Australia

Coordinates: 28°10′23″S 153°31′44″E

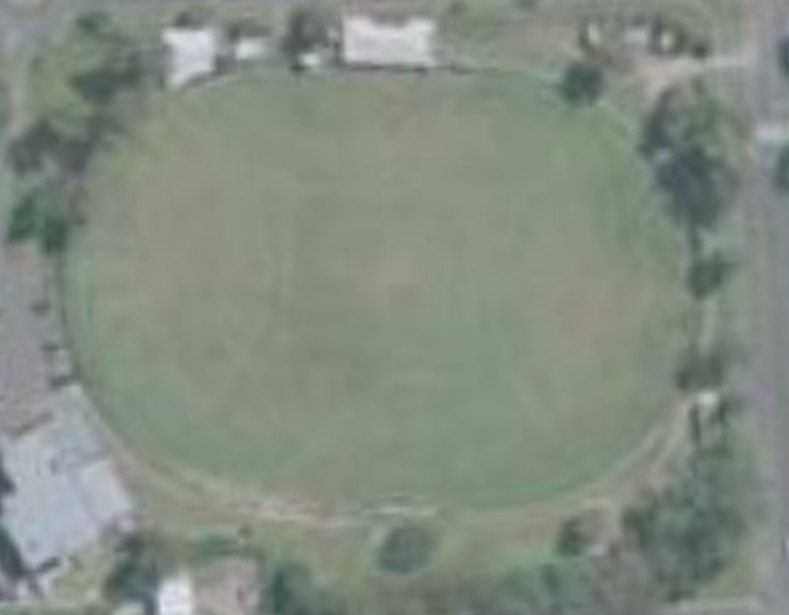
- Interactive map of Len Peak Oval
- Address: 57 Miles Street; Coolangatta, Queensland
- Owner: Gold Coast City Council

Construction
- Groundbreaking: 1964; 62 years ago
- Opened: 1965; 61 years ago

Tenant
- Coolangatta Football Club (QFA)

Len Peak Oval is an Australian rules football venue located in the Gold Coast suburb of Coolangatta, Queensland. It is located 50 metres (160 ft) from the border with New South Wales and is the home of the Coolangatta Football Club in the Queensland Football Association (QFA).

Since 2019, the ground has been known as EXIMM Oval under naming rights.

== History ==
The Coolangatta Football Club was formed in 1962 and played its home matches at Salk Oval, although it dropped out of the Gold Coast Australian Football League (GCAFC) mid-season.

In 1964, a new oval was developed in Coolangatta. At a Gold Coast City Council meeting on 27 November 1964, it was decided to name the new venue after former mayor Len Peak (died 1972). Coolangatta returned to the GCAFC in 1965 and began playing at the new venue the same year.

During the COVID-19 pandemic, access to Len Peak Oval was disrupted by the closure of state borders.

The venue's changing rooms were upgraded in 2023 at a cost of A$828,000.
