= Moreton Bay Central Sports Complex =

Australian rules football complex in Queensland

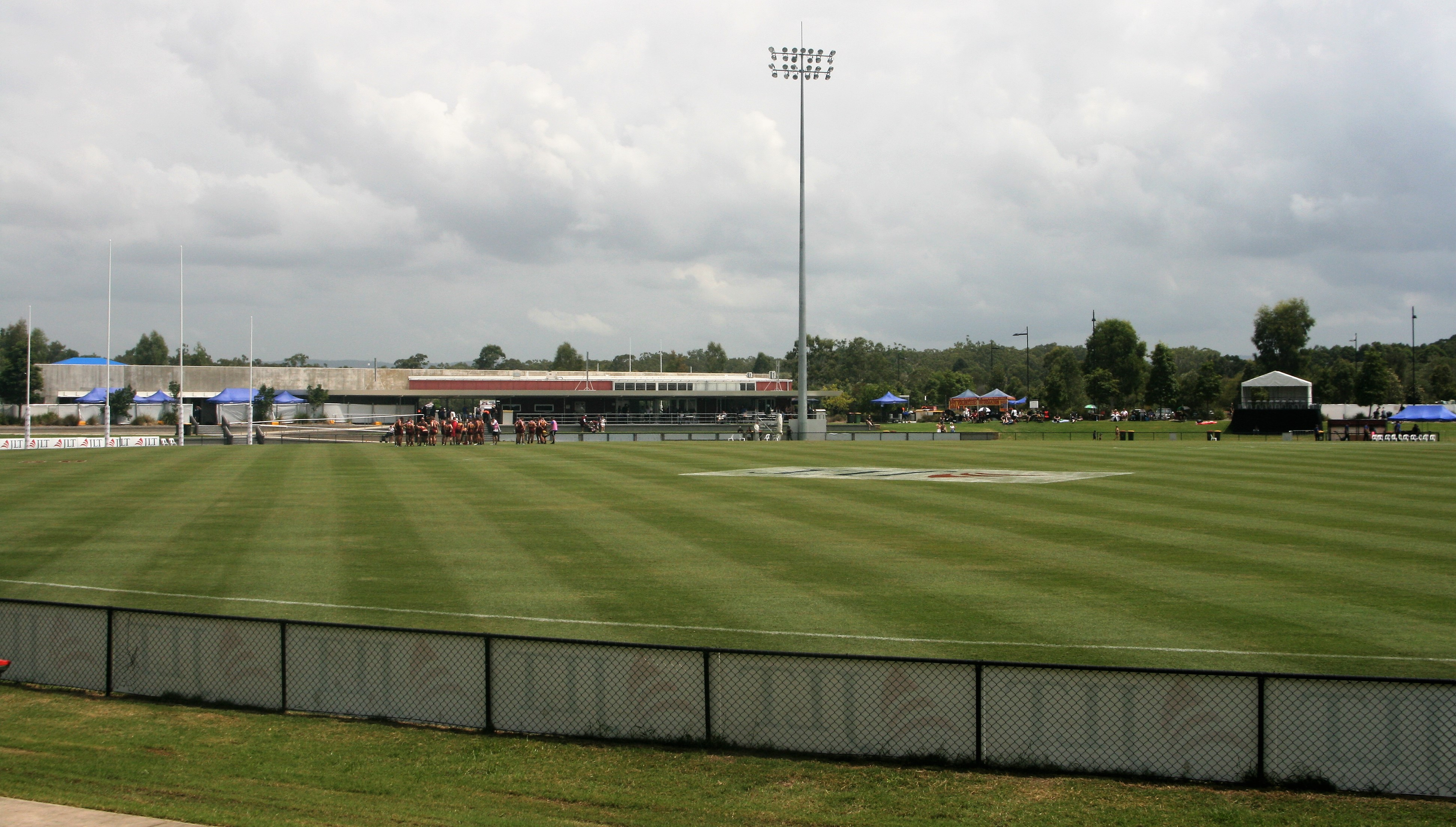
- Main ground of the complex in March 2018

- Location within Queensland
- Location: Burpengary, Queensland
- Coordinates: 27.132605°S 152.97517°E
- Capacity: 6,500
- Surface: Grass
- Record attendance: 6,200 (2015 NAB Challenge)

Construction
- Opened: 2013

Tenants
- Caboolture Sports (2019−); Moreton Bay (QFA North) (2013–); Brisbane Lions (AFLW) (2019–)

Moreton Bay Central Sports Complex is a sports field complex in Burpengary, a suburb of the City of Moreton Bay, Queensland, Australia, primarily for both Australian rules football and soccer. It was built and opened in 2013 and are managed by Caboolture Sports Football Club, Moreton Bay Australian Football Club and AFL Queensland's Northern Brisbane Academy Programs. It is the home ground for Caboolture Sports Football Club, playing within Football Queensland competitions, and also the home ground for Moreton Bay in the Queensland Football Association Northern Conference. It was the primary home ground for the Brisbane Lions AFL Women's team from 2019 until the completion of Springfield Central Stadium in 2022.

== Soccer ==
Caboolture Sports Football Club are located in the Moreton Bay Central Sports Complex. This complex was opened in May 2019 and is a new multi-million-dollar purpose-built football facility. The clubhouse is surrounded by a synthetic field and two full size fields. Additionally, 3 more full size fields are planned to be constructed. Caboolture Sports FC is an established, progressive club and in 2016 re-affiliated with Football Brisbane (now Football Queensland Metro) after being part of Sunshine Coast Football for 20 years. The club's senior men side currently play in the Football Queensland Premier League and also has many successful junior teams playing in Football Queensland Metro competitions. The senior women field a Women's Capital 1 League and reserve team. Caboolture Sports FC turned 50 years in 2019 and now have an active membership of over 850 players, ranging from Miniroos, juniors, boys and girls, City league and Over 45's, plus a newly established 7-a-side preseason competition.

== AFL ==
The Brisbane Lions' AFL Women's (AFLW) team uses the venue as a home ground. It hosted its first AFLW game on 10 March 2018, between Brisbane and Collingwood. It became the Lions' primary home ground for the 2019 season, replacing South Pine Sports Complex.

It has also served as a home ground for the club's reserves team in the NEAFL; and it has hosted AFL pre-season games involving the Brisbane Lions since it was opened.

== Attendance records ==
No.	Date	Teams	Sport	Competition	Crowd
1	28 February 2015	Brisbane Lions v. St Kilda	Australian rules football	AFL (preseason)	6,200
2	8 March 2014	Brisbane Lions v. Sydney	Australian rules football	AFL (preseason)	6,096
3	21 February 2016	Brisbane Lions v. Gold Coast	Australian rules football	AFL (preseason)	3,807
4	3 February 2019	Brisbane v. Greater Western Sydney	Australian rules football	AFLW	2,850
5	3 March 2019	Brisbane Lions v. Hawthorn	Australian rules football	AFL (preseason)	2,812
