= AFL Darling Downs =

Australian rules football competition

- Most recent season or competition: 2024 AFL Queensland season
- Formerly: Darling Downs Australian Football League
- Sport: Australian rules football
- Founded: 1971; 55 years ago
- No. of teams: 7
- Most recent champion: Coolaroo (2025)
- Most titles: University Cougars (13)
- Promotion to: (none)
- Relegation to: (none)
- Website: aflq.com.au/darlingdowns

AFL Darling Downs (AFLDD) coordinates Australian rules football competitions in the Darling Downs and South Burnett regions of Queensland including its major city of Toowoomba where there are four of the senior clubs are based. The competition was formed as the Darling Downs Australian Football League in 1971. AFL Darling Downs has senior men's, women's as well as multiple grades of junior competition.

The senior representative team is known as the Demons and wear guernseys modelled on the Melbourne Demons guernseys.

== History ==
The Warwick Football Club was formed in 1873 in Warwick to play under Australian rules, however lacking any nearby competitors for 3 years it played mostly intra-club scratch matches. A Toowoomba Football Club was formed on 12th May, 1876 by members of the Civil Service. Brisbane Civil Service travelled to Toowoomba to play against a newly formed club in 1876. AFL Queensland cites the Toowoomba Football Club as forming in 1873, however few sources back this up. As the game spread further west of the Great Divide clubs were split on whether to adopt rugby or Australian rules. Nevertheless, it is noted that clubs from the region in this era were able to hold their own against those from Brisbane.

A Toowoomba Football Association formed in early July 1876 to coordinate matches between Toowoomba and Warwick clubs. Teams were 16-a-side. Accounts of the play match those of Australian rules of the time, including the cricket club involvement, match duration, umpire, lack of an offiside and kicking goals from the general field of play. The Light Infantry Corps formed in July 1876 to play against the Light Infantry Football Club. The Association disappeared a couple of years later. As Downs clubs lacked nearby opponents rugby was more suited to facilitating matches against New South Wales clubs, as a result local competition went into recess. An exception was an 1878 match between Old-Victorians and All Comers played in front of a large crowd.

The Queensland Football Association formed in 1880 and affiliated with the Victorian Football Association, however clubs outside of Brisbane were becoming increasingly frustrated by the lack of representation for the whole colony. In 1881 matches were once again played in Toowoomba when the Toowoomba Grammar took up the sport. By 1882, a Toowoomba Association (affiliated with the QFA) had re-formed including both clubs and schools in the region. In 1883, a team of 12 travelled from Excelsior FC (Brisbane), noting a revival of the code in the region. The inclusion of the Allora Football Club at Allora in 1883 provided more regular interaction between the clubs. However the code suffered a major blow when, after the Brisbane private school association in 1887 voted to switch to rugby including Toowoomba Grammar. A senior Toowoomba Rugby Football Club formed in 1887 and this was the last mention of the Toowoomba Football Club or any other Downs clubs playing Australian rules. After the collapse of the QFA in 1890 the Toowoomba Rugby Association and Toowoomba British Football Association were able to grow unopposed.

=== Modern Competition ===
The Darling Downs Australian Football League was first played as an official organised competition in 1971. Signals, Coolaroo and Aviation were the three foundation clubs and were joined by a fourth club, South Toowoomba in 1972.

The League has had many changes to the number of clubs participating since then, with eight A Grade Senior Clubs currently competing, and now known as AFL Darling Downs. It is a regional league in Queensland. There are four Senior clubs based in Toowoomba, and the other senior clubs come from Dalby, Goondiwindi, and Warwick. New teams from Kingaroy, and Chinchilla participated in the 2013 revamped competition. Chinchilla folded in 2018.

University Cougars AFC is the most successful club with 13 premierships, 4 under the banner of "Institute Eagles" and 9 under the moniker of "University Eagles". Coolaroo Roos has 12 premierships and Goondiwindi Hawks has 8 along with South Toowoomba Bombers (formerly Longhorns). Toowoomba Tigers (formerly Pinkies) have 6 premiership flags.

== Clubs ==
There have been many different towns in the Darling Downs of Queensland fielding Australian Rules Football teams over the forty plus years of Senior Competition. Coolaroo Roos have played every season from the inaugural year, and Toowoomba Tigers have played the second most seasons. Below is a full list of current and former clubs in the region.

=== Locations ===
Red = Senior

Yellow = junior only

Club locations - Toowoomba	Club locations - Darling Downs

=== Senior ===
Club	Colours	Nickname	Home Ground	Founded	Years in League	Senior Premierships	
Club	Colours	Nickname	Home Ground	Founded	Years in League	Total	Years
Coolaroo		Roos	Rockville Park, Wilsonton Heights	1971	1971-	13	1975, 2001, 2002, 2003, 2004, 2005, 2009, 2013, 2015, 2022, 2023, 2024, 2025
Goondiwindi (Goondiwindi-Moonie 1987)		Hawks	Riddles Oval, Goondiwindi	1978	1980-	8	1980, 1983, 1991, 1995, 1996, 1999, 2000, 2019
South Burnett		Saints	Lyle Vidler Oval, Kingaroy	2013	2013-	0	-
South Toowoomba (Central Bombers 2005-06)		Bombers	Heritage Oval, Southern Cross Reserve, Harlaxton	1971	1972-1994, 1996-1998, 2005-	8	1972, 1976, 1981, 1982, 1984, 2008, 2020, 2021
Toowoomba		Tigers	Rockville Park, Wilsonton Heights	1973	1974-2002, 2004-	6	1977, 1979, 1988, 2010, 2011, 2012
University (Institute 1976-89)		Cougars	Baker St Oval, Darling Heights	1976	1976-	13	1978, 1986, 1987, 1990, 1992, 1994, 1997, 1998, 2006, 2007, 2016, 2017, 2018
Warwick		Redbacks	Roddies Oval, Warwick	1996	1999-	1	2014

=== Junior only ===
Club	Colours	Nickname	Home Ground	Founded	Years in League
Downlands College		Gryphons	Concordia Lutheran College	2018	2018-

=== Former ===
Club	Colours	Nickname	Home Ground	Est.	Years in League	Premierships		Fate
Club	Colours	Nickname	Home Ground	Est.	Years in League	Total	Years	Fate
Aviation			RAAF Base Oakey Oval, Oakey	1971	1971-1977	2	1973, 1974	Folded after 1977 season
Chinchilla		Suns	Chinchilla Recreation Grounds, Chinchilla	2013	2013-2019	0	-	Folded after 2019 season
Coolaroo 2		Roos	Rockville Park, Wilsonton Heights	1971	2002	0	-	Folded
Dalby		Swans	Dalby AFL Oval, Dalby	1980	1980-2022	0	-	Folded after 2022 season
Goondiwindi 2		Hawks	Riddles Oval, Goondiwindi	1978	2000	0	-	Folded
Highfields		Lions	Kratzke Road Recreation Reserve, Highfields	2003	2010-2019	0	-	Folded after 2019 season
Kingaroy (South Burnett 1982-86)		Bulldogs	Lyle Vidler Oval, Kingaroy	1982	1982-1986, 1989-2004	0	-	Recess between 1987-88. Folded after 2004 season
Lockyer Valley (1)		Magpies	Cahill Park, Gatton	1981	1981-1994, 1996-1998	2	1985, 1993	Played in Brisbane AFL in 1995. Folded after 1998 season
Lockyer Valley (2)		Demons	Cahill Park, Gatton	2010	2010-2017	0	-	Folded after 2017 season
Lockyer-Warwick				1980	1980	0	-	Split into Lockyer Valley and Warwick in 1981
Moonie		Saints	Moonie Reserve, Moonie	1984	1984-1986	0	-	Merged with Goondiwindi after 1986 season
QAC Gatton			Queensland Agricultural College Gatton Campus Oval, Gatton	1974	1974, 1977	0	-	Recess in 1975-76. Folded after 1977 season
Signals (Combined Services 1973)			Borneo Barracks Oval, Cabarlah	1971	1971-1974	1	1971	Folded after 1974 season
Warwick (1)		Wallabies	Roddies Oval, Warwick	1981	1981-1986	0	-	Folded partway through 1986 season

NOTE: Some clubs listed above played in Reserve Grade (Division 2) only for many seasons, but were not part of the A Grade competition and those years are not included in the above table.

== AFL Darling Downs A Grade Premiers List ==
- 1971 Signals
- 1972 South Toowoomba
- 1973 Aviation
- 1974 Aviation
- 1975 Coolaroo
- 1976 South Toowoomba
- 1977 Toowoomba
- 1978 Institute
- 1979 Toowoomba
- 1980 Goondiwindi
- 1981 South Toowoomba
- 1982 South Toowoomba
- 1983 Goondiwindi
- 1984 South Toowoomba
- 1985 Lockyer Valley
- 1986 Institute
- 1987 Institute
- 1988 Toowoomba
- 1989 Institute
- 1990 University
- 1991 Goondiwindi
- 1992 University
- 1993 Lockyer Valley
- 1994 University
- 1995 Goondiwindi
- 1996 Goondiwindi
- 1997 University
- 1998 University
- 1999 Goondiwindi
- 2000 Goondiwindi
- 2001 Coolaroo
- 2002 Coolaroo
- 2003 Coolaroo
- 2004 Coolaroo
- 2005 Coolaroo
- 2006 University
- 2007 University
- 2008 South Toowoomba
- 2009 Coolaroo
- 2010 Toowoomba
- 2011 Toowoomba
- 2012 Toowoomba
- 2013 Coolaroo
- 2014 Warwick
- 2015 Coolaroo
- 2016 University
- 2017 University
- 2018 University
- 2019 Goondiwindi
- 2020 South Toowoomba
- 2021 South Toowoomba
- 2022 Coolaroo
- 2023 Coolaroo
- 2024 Coolaroo
- 2025 Coolaroo

== AFL Darling Downs A Grade Grand Final Results ==
=== Men ===
Year	Premiers	Score	Runners Up	Score	Best On Ground
1971	Signals	5.11 (41)	Coolaroo	4.14 (38)	
1972	South Toowoomba	14.16 (100)	Aviation	6.11 (47)	
1973	Aviation		South Toowoomba		
1974	Aviation	18.15 (123)	Toowoomba	11.11 (77)	
1975	Coolaroo	9.14 (68)	South Toowoomba	7.14 (56)	Glen Adamson (South Toowoomba)
1976	South Toowoomba	9.13 (67)	Toowoomba	5.16 (46)	Steve Bensen (Toowoomba)
1977	Toowoomba	12.12 (84)	Coolaroo	2.12 (24)	Trevor Curtis (Toowoomba)
1978	Institute	18.9 (117)	Toowoomba	14.14 (98)	
1979	Toowoomba		Institute		
1980	Goondiwindi	26.18 (174)	Toowoomba	15.15 (105)	Mark Holman (Goondiwindi)
1981	South Toowoomba	26.26 (182)	Goondiwindi	19.16 (130)	
1982	South Toowoomba		Goondiwindi		
1983	Goondiwindi	19.15 (129)	South Toowoomba	9.11 (65)	Peter Holman (Goondiwindi)
1984	South Toowoomba	17.10 (112)	Coolaroo	13.14 (92)	Mick Barnes (South Toowoomba)
1985	Lockyer Valley	14.13 (97)	South Toowoomba	10.11 (71)	
1986	Institute	25.14 (164)	Lockyer Valley	11.6 (72)	Russell Mann (Institute)
1987	Institute	22.11 (143)	Goondiwindi/Moonie	16.8 (104)	Martin Webber (Institute)
1988	Toowoomba	15.15 (105)	Dalby	12.9 (81)	
1989	Institute	20.20 (140)	Goondiwindi	7.7 (49)	Gary Brooks (Institute)
1990	University	18.13 (121)	Goondiwindi	11.13 (79)	
1991	Goondiwindi	15.15 (105)	University	9.9 (63)	Tony Doherty (Goondiwindi)
1992	University	18.13 (121)	Goondiwindi	7.3 (45)	Chris Dwyer (University)
1993	Lockyer Valley	24.12 (156)	University	15.14 (104)	Troy McElhinney (Lockyer Valley)
1994	University	14.3 (87)	Goondiwindi	11.13 (79)	Sam Pellegrino (University)
1995	Goondiwindi	11.8 (74)	University	10.8 (68)	
1996	Goondiwindi	12.20 (92)	University	12.9 (81)	
1997	University	11.3 (69)	Goondiwindi	8.13 (61)	
1998	University	22.8 (140)	Goondiwindi	9.4 (58)	Manu Roberts (University)
1999	Goondiwindi	16.18 (114)	Toowoomba	4.6 (30)	
2000	Goondiwindi	16 10 (106)	Coolaroo	13.12 (90)	
2001	Coolaroo	14.17 (101)	Warwick	2.6 (18)	
2002	Coolaroo	21.7 (133)	Warwick	8.9 (57)	
2003	Coolaroo	23.13 (151)	Goondiwindi	8.7 (55)	Clinton Wright (Coolaroo)
2004	Coolaroo	10.8 (68)	Toowoomba	6.9 (45)	Damian Cooper (Coolaroo)
2005	Coolaroo	16.11 (107)	Central Bombers	5.8 (38)	Phil Dreise (Coolaroo)
2006	University	16.12 (108)	Toowoomba	6.7 (43)	Glenn Treacy (University)
2007	University	14.9 (93)	Coolaroo Roos	13.6 (84)	Des Anthony (University)
2008	South Toowoomba	11.14 (80)	Coolaroo Roos	11.7 (73)	
2009	Coolaroo	10.13 (73)	South Toowoomba	5.9 (39)	Jeremy Wilson (Coolaroo)
2010	Toowoomba	10.17 (77)	South Toowoomba	10.14 (74)	Nicholas Upton (Toowoomba)
2011	Toowoomba	10.10 (70)	Warwick	7.7 (49)	
2012	Toowoomba	11.15 (81)	South Toowoomba	7.10 (52)	Hugh Priest (Toowoomba)
2013	Coolaroo	14.8 (92)	University	13.11 (89)	Thomas Rudolph (Coolaroo)
2014	Warwick	10.18 (78)	University	9.7 (61)	Adam Stevenson (Warwick)
2015	Coolaroo	15.15 (105)	Goondiwindi	8.12 (60)	Michael Langton (Coolaroo)
2016	University	11.10 (76)	South Toowoomba	6.11 (47)	Benjamin Holmes (University)
2017	University	12.11 (83)	Goondiwindi	6.3 (39)	Rick Mackay (University)
2018	University	11.9 (75)	Goondiwindi	7.9 (51)	Joshua White (University)
2019	Goondiwindi	7.9 (51)	Coolaroo	5.17 (47)	Jermery Leahy (Goondiwindi)
2020	South Toowoomba	11.9 (75)	Goondiwindi	9.2 (56)	Darby Edgeworth (Souths)
2021	South Toowoomba	10.5 (65)	University	7.5 (47)	Johnathan Leidig (Souths)
2022	Coolaroo	10.11 (71)	South Toowoomba	9.7 (61)	
2023	Coolaroo	13.15 (93)	Goondiwindi	7.5 (47)	
2024	Coolaroo	17.9 (111)	Goondiwindi	3.6 (24)	
2025	Coolaroo	13.7 (85)	University	13.6 (84)	
2026	University	12.8 (80)	Goondiwindi	11.8 (74)	

=== Women ===
Year	Premiers	Score	Runners Up	Score
2013	South Toowoomba	8.15 (63)	Lockyer Valley	1.0 (6)
2014	Dalby	7.2 (44)	South Toowoomba	4.12 (36)
2015	Toowoomba	6.9 (45)	Dalby	3.5 (23)
2016	Toowoomba	9.16 (70)	Goondiwindi	1.0 (6)
2017	Toowoomba	7.5 (45)	Dalby	1.2 (8)
2018	Toowoomba	7.3 (45)	University	0.5 (5)
2019	Toowoomba	9.7 (61)	University	3.7 (25)
2020	Toowoomba	6.8 (44)	South Toowoomba	1.4 (10)
2021	Toowoomba	5.4 (34)	Goondiwindi	0.3 (3)
2022	Goondiwindi	3.3 (21)	Toowoomba	2.2 (14)
2023	Toowoomba	3.5 (23)	University	2.2 (14)
2024	Toowoomba	9.6 (60)	University	0.4 (4)
2025	Toowoomba	4.10 (34)	Goondiwindi	1.2 (8)

== Inaugural Darling Downs AFL Grand Final Results ==
Year	Premiers	Score	Runners Up	Score
1971	Signals	5.11 (41)	Coolaroo Roos	4.14 (38)

GOALS:
Signals – B.Fletcher 2, W. Sampson, T. Osborne, M. Darby.
Coolaroo Roos – A. Jericho 2, I. Shaw, J. Oska.
BEST:
Signals – T. Osborne, D. Akesson, J. Davis, J. Walsh, K. Zeller.
Coolaroo Roos – R. Smith, J. Hagerstrom, J. Smith, A. Jericho, C. Wells.

== AFL Darling Downs Premiership Tables and Finals Results ==
Below is a summary of AFL Darling Downs A Grade Ladders at the end of the home and away fixtures, and the Finals Results for the major rounds:

=== 2006 Ladder ===
AFL Darling Downs	Wins	Byes	Losses	Draws	For	Against	%	Pts	Final	Team	G	B	Pts	Team	G	B	Pts
University	12	0	2	0	1419	697	203.59%	48	1st Semi	Toowoomba	15	18	108	Centrals	8	7	55
Coolaroo	11	0	3	0	1748	712	245.51%	44	2nd Semi	University	16	12	108	Coolaroo	6	9	45
Toowoomba	9	0	5	0	1360	937	145.14%	36	Preliminary	Toowoomba	14	6	90	Coolaroo	11	13	79
Centrals	7	0	6	0	1259	997	126.28%	28	Grand	University	16	12	108	Toowoomba	6	7	43
Goondiwindi	7	0	7	0	1134	1233	91.97%	28									
Warwick	4	0	9	0	1057	1211	87.28%	16									
Dalby	2	0	11	0	646	1577	40.96%	8									
Kingaroy	2	0	11	0	626	1885	33.21%	8									

=== 2007 Ladder ===
AFL Darling Downs	Wins	Byes	Losses	Draws	For	Against	%	Pts	Final	Team	G	B	Pts	Team	G	B	Pts
Coolaroo	14	3	0	0	1261	698	180.66%	56	1st Semi	Toowoomba	15	14	104	South Toowoomba	15	10	100
University	10	3	4	0	1445	757	190.89%	40	2nd Semi	University	16	16	112	Coolaroo	11	4	70
South Toowoomba	9	3	5	0	1393	1054	132.16%	36	Preliminary	Coolaroo	13	19	97	Toowoomba	11	9	75
Toowoomba	7	3	7	0	1165	1151	101.22%	28	Grand	University	14	9	93	Toowoomba	13	6	84
Warwick	5	3	9	0	997	1254	79.51%	20									
Goondiwindi	2	5	10	0	828	1200	69.00%	8									
Dalby	1	3	13	0	683	1658	41.19%	4									

=== 2008 Ladder ===
AFL Darling Downs	Wins	Byes	Losses	Draws	For	Against	%	Pts	Final	Team	G	B	Pts	Team	G	B	Pts
South Toowoomba	15	0	2	0	1917	1069	179.33%	60	1st Semi	Coolaroo	14	13	97	University	9	19	73
Warwick	13	0	5	0	1553	1436	108.15%	52	2nd Semi	South Toowoomba	18	19	127	Warwick	7	6	48
Coolaroo	10	0	7	1	1663	1191	139.63%	42	Preliminary	Coolaroo	14	10	94	Warwick	5	7	37
University	10	0	7	0	1717	1069	160.62%	40	Grand	South Toowoomba	11	14	80	Coolaroo	11	7	73
Toowoomba	5	0	12	1	1320	1518	86.96%	22									
Goondiwindi	0	0	18	0	713	2504	28.47%	0									
Dalby	0	0	2	0	48	144	33.33%	0									

=== 2009 Ladder ===
AFL Darling Downs	Wins	Byes	Losses	Draws	For	Against	%	Pts	Final	Team	G	B	Pts	Team	G	B	Pts
Coolaroo	16	0	2	0	1860	1087	171.11%	64	1st Semi	Toowoomba	19	10	124	Warwick	8	9	57
South Toowoomba	15	0	3	0	1874	1132	165.55%	60	2nd Semi	South Toowoomba	13	12	90	Coolaroo	11	9	75
Warwick	7	0	11	0	1468	1535	95.64%	28	Preliminary	Coolaroo	17	9	111	Toowoomba	11	9	75
Toowoomba	7	0	11	0	1361	1641	82.94%	28	Grand	Coolaroo	10	13	73	South Toowoomba	5	9	39
University	6	0	12	0	1291	1609	80.24%	24									
Goondiwindi	3	0	15	0	1255	2105	59.62%	12									

=== 2010 Ladder ===
AFL Darling Downs	Wins	Byes	Losses	Draws	For	Against	%	Pts	Final	Team	G	B	Pts	Team	G	B	Pts
Toowoomba	13	0	3	0	1980	948	208.86%	52	1st Semi	South Toowoomba	17	14	116	Coolaroo	7	7	49
University	13	0	3	0	1917	1052	182.22%	52	2nd Semi	Toowoomba	14	13	97	University	9	15	69
Coolaroo	11	0	5	0	1955	959	203.86%	44	Preliminary	South Toowoomba	13	18	96	University	12	17	89
South Toowoomba	11	0	5	0	1901	1029	184.74%	44	Grand	Toowoomba	10	17	77	South Toowoomba	10	14	74
Warwick	11	0	5	0	1925	1088	176.93%	44									
Goondiwindi	6	0	10	0	1576	1575	100.06%	24									
Highfields	5	0	11	0	1166	1832	63.65%	20									
Dalby	2	0	14	0	1034	2065	50.07%	8									
Lockyer Valley	0	0	16	0	368	3274	11.24%	0									

=== 2011 Ladder ===
AFL Darling Downs	Wins	Byes	Losses	Draws	For	Against	%	Pts	Final	Team	G	B	Pts	Team	G	B	Pts
Toowoomba	13	0	3	1	1698	877	193.61%	54	1st Semi	University	19	9	123	South Toowoomba	14	9	93
Warwick	12	0	4	1	1876	867	216.38%	50	2nd Semi	Warwick	10	10	70	Toowoomba	5	3	33
South Toowoomba	12	0	4	1	1853	968	191.43%	50	Preliminary	Toowoomba	9	16	70	University	10	7	67
University	11	0	5	1	1560	941	165.78%	46	Grand	Toowoomba	10	10	70	Warwick	7	7	49
Coolaroo	10	0	6	0	1642	1128	145.57%	40									
Highfields	8	0	8	0	1262	1247	101.20%	32									
Dalby	4	0	12	0	1033	1778	58.10%	16									
Goondiwindi	2	0	14	0	1078	1735	62.13%	8									
Lockyer Valley	0	0	16	0	323	2784	11.60%	0									

=== 2012 Ladder ===
AFL Darling Downs	Wins	Byes	Losses	Draws	For	Against	%	Pts	Final	Team	G	B	Pts	Team	G	B	Pts
South Toowoomba	14	0	1	1	2036	731	278.52%	58	1st Semi	Toowoomba	11	13	79	University	9	9	63
Coolaroo	13	0	3	0	1856	954	194.55%	52	2nd Semi	South Toowoomba	18	9	117	Coolaroo	13	9	87
Toowoomba	12	0	3	1	1861	819	227.23%	50	Preliminary	Toowoomba	14	12	96	Coolaroo	12	13	85
University	10	0	6	0	1840	864	212.96%	40	Grand	Toowoomba	11	15	81	South Toowoomba	7	10	52
Warwick	7	0	8	1	1268	1110	114.23%	30									
Highfields	6	0	9	1	1127	1162	96.99%	26									
Dalby	4	0	12	0	1056	2046	51.61%	16									
Lockyer Valley	2	0	14	0	473	2361	20.03%	8									
Goondiwindi	1	0	15	0	786	2256	34.84%	4									

=== 2013 Ladder ===
AFL Darling Downs	Wins	Byes	Losses	Draws	For	Against	%	Pts	Final	Team	G	B	Pts	Team	G	B	Pts
University	15	0	1	0	2145	706	303.82%	60	Elimination	Warwick	15	7	97	Goondiwindi	11	6	72
Coolaroo	15	0	1	0	2226	815	273.13%	60	Qualifying	Toowoomba	10	15	75	Toowoomba	10	15	75
Toowoomba	12	0	4	0	1566	913	171.52%	48	1st Semi	Toowoomba	20	10	130	Warwick	9	2	56
Warwick	9	0	7	0	1525	1150	132.61%	36	2nd Semi	University	10	15	75	Coolaroo	10	9	69
Goondiwindi	9	0	7	0	1675	1293	129.54%	36	Preliminary	Coolaroo	15	13	103	Toowoomba	5	6	36
South Toowoomba	8	0	8	0	1500	1177	127.44%	32	Grand	Coolaroo	14	8	92	University	13	11	89
Dalby	8	0	8	0	1573	1298	121.19%	32									
Highfields	5	0	11	0	1203	1786	67.36%	20									
South Burnett	4	0	12	0	1140	2070	55.07%	16									
Lockyer Valley	2	0	14	0	762	2294	33.22%	8									
Chinchilla	1	0	15	0	687	2500	27.48%	4									

== AFL Darling Downs Best and Fairest Award (Holman Medalist) ==
Season	Holman Medalist	Club
1971	Terry Osborne	Signals
1972	Ray Smith	Coolaroo Roos
1973	Terry Lee	Aviation
1974	John Grinham	Toowoomba Pinkies
1975	Harold Simpson	Coolaroo Roos
1976	John Loxton	Institute Eagles
1977	Phil Pohlner	QAC Gatton
1978	Trevor Curtis	Toowoomba Pinkies
1979	Phil Heron	Institute Eagles
1980	Ian Janetzki	Coolaroo Roos
1981	Mark Freidrichs	South Toowoomba Longhorns
1982	Mark Holman	Goondiwindi Hawks
1983	Peter Scott	Lockyer Valley Magpies
1984	John Green	Coolaroo Roos
1985	John Green	Coolaroo Roos
1986	John Green	Coolaroo Roos
1987	Peter Holman	Goondiwindi-Moonie
1988	Peter Holman	Goondiwindi Hawks
1989	Greg Peltz	Dalby Swans
1990	Michael Millar	South Toowoomba Longhorns
1991	Jason Dennis	Coolaroo Roos
1992	Andrew Fellenberg	South Toowoomba Longhorns
1993	Shane McGregor	Goondiwindi Hawks
1994	Shane Taggart	Toowoomba Tigers
1995	Mark Andrews	Toowoomba Tigers
1996	Brendan Sergeant	Coolaroo Roos
1997	Craig Jervies	Lockyer Valley Magpies
1998	Craig Jervies	Lockyer Valley Magpies
1999	Luke Bolden	Coolaroo Roos
2000	Greg Peltz	Dalby Swans
2001	Darren Hunter	Coolaroo Roos
2002	Bernie Mullins (TIED)	Coolaroo Roos
2002	Tony O'Connell (TIED)	Kingaroy Bulldogs
2003	Geoffrey Smith	Warwick Redbacks
2004	Matthew Samin	Coolaroo Roos
2005	Keith Webb	Central Bombers
2006	Steve Collet (TIED)	Goondiwind Hawks
2006	Angus Hill (TIED)	Coolaroo Roos
2007	Phillip Driese	Coolaroo Roos
2008	Paul Kupke	University Cougars
2009	Jeff Neumann (TIED)	Coolaroo Roos
2009	Brendan Iles (TIED)	Warwick Redbacks
2010	Brendan Iles	Warwick Redbacks
2011	Brendan Iles	Warwick Redbacks
2012	Trent Saxelby	South Toowoomba Bombers
2013	Kurt Millard	Warwick Redbacks
2014	Jeremy Leahy	Goondiwindi Hawks
2015	Jeremy Leahy	Goondiwindi Hawks
2016	Tyhe Clarkson	Warwick Redbacks
2017	David O'Toole	Goondiwindi Hawks
2018	Nathan Trace	South Burnett Saints
2019	Michael Langton (TIED)	Coolaroo Roos
2019	Charles Youngman (TIED)	Goondiwindi Hawks
2020	Nathan Trace	South Burnett Saints
2021	Jayden Smith	Coolaroo Roos

== Reserve Grade ==
The Reserve Grade competition ran from 1975 to 1999, and 2001, before player numbers for some clubs became a problem and therefore the "Adrian Jericho Trophy" had not been contested for a full decade.

In 2012, the Reserves competition returned with a three team competition involving University, Coolaroo, and Souths. It was the first time the competition has been staged since Kingaroy defeated Coolaroo in the 2001 Grand Final.

South Toowoomba Longhorns are the most successful team in Reserve Grade with 10 Premierships from 14 Grand Finals. University (Institute) are the next best with 8 flags from 11 Grand Finals.

=== Reserve Grade (Division 2) Grand Final Results ===
Year	Premiers	Score	Runners Up	Score
1975	Coolaroo Roos	8.6 (54)	Q.A.C. Gatton	7.4 (46)
1976	Coolaroo Roos	4.17 (41)	South Toowoomba Longhorns	4.7 (31)
1977	Toowoomba Pinkies	4.6 (30)	Coolaroo Roos	3.4 (22)
1978	South Toowoomba Longhorns	7.9 (51)	Institute Eagles	3.2 (20)
1979	South Toowoomba Longhorns	6.11 (47)	Toowoomba Pinkies	2.8 (20)
1980	South Toowoomba Longhorns	7.8 (50)	Institute Eagles	6.8 (44)
1981	South Burnett	12.13 (85)	Toowoomba Tigers	10.5 (65)
1982	South Toowoomba Longhorns	14.15 (99)	Coolaroo Roos	3.7 (25)
1983	South Toowoomba Longhorns	16.16 (112)	Warwick	8.6 (54)
1984	South Toowoomba Longhorns	16.10 (106)	Moonie	9.9 (63)
1985	South Burnett	12.13 (85)	Toowoomba Tigers	5.8 (38)
1986	Toowoomba Tigers	16.17 (113)	South Toowoomba Longhorns	4.10 (34)
1987	South Toowoomba Longhorns	14.16 (100)	Dalby Swans	12.10 (82)
1988	South Toowoomba Longhorns	12.12 (84)	Goondiwindi-Moonie	5.13 (43)
1989	South Toowoomba Longhorns	8.7 (55)	Coolaroo Roos	6.9 (45)
1990	South Toowoomba Longhorns	8.10 (58)	Lockyer Valley Magpies	6.15 (51)
1991	University Eagles	7.11 (53)	South Toowoomba Longhorns	5.14 (44)
1992	University Eagles	11.19 (85)	Lockyer Valley Magpies	8.6 (54)
1993	University Eagles	8.6 (54)	South Toowoomba Longhorns	6.15 (51)
1994	University Eagles	13.16 (94)	Toowoomba Tigers	6.5 (41)
1995	Dalby Swans	12.11 (83)	Goondiwindi Hawks	8.8 (56)
1996	University Eagles	8.15 (63)	Dalby Swans	6.5 (41)
1997	University Eagles	6.4 (40)	Kingaroy Bulldogs	5.4 (34)
1998	Warwick Redbacks	13.9 (87)	Kingaroy Bulldogs	12.4 (76)
1999	Lockyer Valley Magpies	10.11 (71)	Dalby Swans	9.12 (66)
2000	COMPETITION SUSPENDED			
2001	Kingaroy Bulldogs	5.8 (38)	Coolaroo Roos	5.1 (31)
2002-2011	COMPETITION SUSPENDED			
2012	University Cougars	11.10 (76)	Coolaroo Roos	5.4 (34)
2013	Coolaroo Roos	7.9 (51)	University Cougars	6.8 (44)
2014	University Cougars	11.14 (80)	South Burnett Saints	4.7 (31)
2015	South Burnett Saints	10.9 (69)	Dalby Swans	6.11 (47)
2016	COMPETITION SUSPENDED			
2017	Dalby Swans	8.12 (60)	Warwick Redbacks	6.6 (42)
2018-	COMPETITION SUSPENDED			

== Future of AFL Darling Downs ==
The Reserve Grade or a Division 2 Competition will resume as soon as the competition can gain enough interest once again.

The League has the potential to expand to 12 Senior Clubs if these areas can field enough players, and with Junior competitions also expanding. In recent seasons, the League has fielded up to 11 sides in Division One already.

=== Divisional Football ===
League president Andrew Foley said splitting the 11-team competition into two divisions for 2014, including the three current reserve grade sides, would help the newer clubs to be more competitive. The senior competition grew last season with the formation of Chinchilla and South Burnett but those clubs struggled on-field . First division has Coolaroo, Goondiwidi, Highfields, Lockyer Valley, South Toowoomba, Toowoomba, university and Warwick. Second division has Chinchilla, Dalby, South Burnett as well as clubs seconds from Coolaroo, Highfields, South Toowoomba, university and Warwick.

=== 2014 Ladder ===
AFL Darling Downs Div 1	Wins	Byes	Losses	Draws	For	Against	%	Pts	Final	Team	G	B	Pts	Team	G	B	Pts
Warwick	14	0	3	0	1962	962	203.95%	56	1st Semi	Coolaroo	17	11	113	Goondiwindi	12	5	77
University	13	0	3	1	1925	729	264.06%	54	2nd Semi	Warwick	13	16	94	University	7	14	56
Coolaroo	13	0	3	1	2061	857	240.49%	54	Preliminary	University	12	12	84	Coolaroo	10	11	71
Goondiwindi	10	0	7	0	1763	1324	133.16%	40	Grand	Warwick	10	18	78	University	9	7	61
South Toowoomba	9	0	7	1	1559	1103	141.34%	38									
Highfields	5	0	12	0	1330	1616	82.30%	20									
Toowoomba	2	0	14	1	795	2025	39.26%	10									
Lockyer Valley	0	0	17	0	317	3096	10.24%	0									

AFL Darling Downs Div 2	Wins	Byes	Losses	Draws	For	Against	%	Pts	Final	Team	G	B	Pts	Team	G	B	Pts
South Burnett	12	0	2	1	1634	633	258.14%	50	1st Semi	Dalby	12	12	84	Highfields	11	9	75
University	11	0	2	2	1118	385	290.39%	48	2nd Semi	South Burnett	13	14	92	University	9	6	60
Dalby	9	0	6	0	1312	852	153.99%	36	Preliminary	University	12	12	84	Highfields	3	1	19
Highfields	8	0	7	0	1194	785	152.10%	32	Grand	University	11	14	80	South Burnett	4	7	31
Chinchilla	7	0	8	0	1135	1193	95.14%	28									
South Toowoomba	5	0	9	1	763	1452	52.55%	22									
Coolaroo	3	0	10	2	685	973	70.40%	16									
Warwick	2	0	13	0	454	2022	22.45%	8									

== See also ==
- Australian Rules football in Queensland
- Toowoomba Rugby League
