= Moreton Bay Australian Football Club =

Moreton Bay Lions

Names
- Full name: Moreton Bay Lions Australian Football Sports Club
- Former name(s): Southern Districts AFC, Caboolture AFC
- Nickname: Lions
- Former nickname(s): Bombers, Bears
- Club song: "Oh we're from Lion Land!"

Club details
- Founded: 1986; 40 years ago
- Colours
- Competition: Division 3
- Chairperson: Cheryl Rullis-Sheil
- Coach: Senior Men: Hayden Jeffrey Senior Women: Todd Spackman & Jessica Davy
- Premierships: 1999 BAFL Division 2, 2014 QWAFA, 2019 QFA Div 3, 2020 QFA Div 2 North, 2021 QFA Div 2 North, 2023 QFAW Div 1
- Ground: Moreton Bay Central Sports Complex (capacity: 8,000)

Uniforms
Home

Moreton Bay Lions Australian Football Sports Club is an Australian rules football club based in Burpengary, Queensland. The club's Senior Men's and Women's teams currently competes in AFL Queensland's QFA Division 1 and QAFLW competitions respectively.

== History ==
The club was formed in 1986 as the Southern Districts Australian Football Club. The original playing jumper was that of Essendon and they were known as the "Bombers".

The club commenced in the Sunshine Coast competition and played their first season in 1987. In 1988 the club became incorporated and registered as Caboolture and Southern Districts Australian Football Club Inc. By mid 1990 the council had prepared a playing field on Beerburrum Road adjacent to the Historical Village. Club members and volunteers built a clubhouse and change rooms.

In 1991 the club progressed to the South Queensland Australian Football League and would play against suburban clubs of the greater Brisbane area. The club adopted the Brisbane Bears' uniform and nickname in 1992, and again followed suit when Brisbane merged with Fitzroy to become the Lions in 1996. The club was very competitive during the 1990s and were runners up several times. In 1999 the club won its first senior premiership.

In December 2014, it was decided the club's name would be changed from Caboolture to Moreton Bay.

In 2019, under new coach John Soccio, the Moreton Bay Lions won the premiership by 64 points, defeating the Wynnum Vikings. Captain Rhys Nickalls booted 15 goals to take the Best On Ground Award, capping off a season that included 119 goals in total.

== Premierships ==
1999 BAFL Division 2

2014 QWAFA

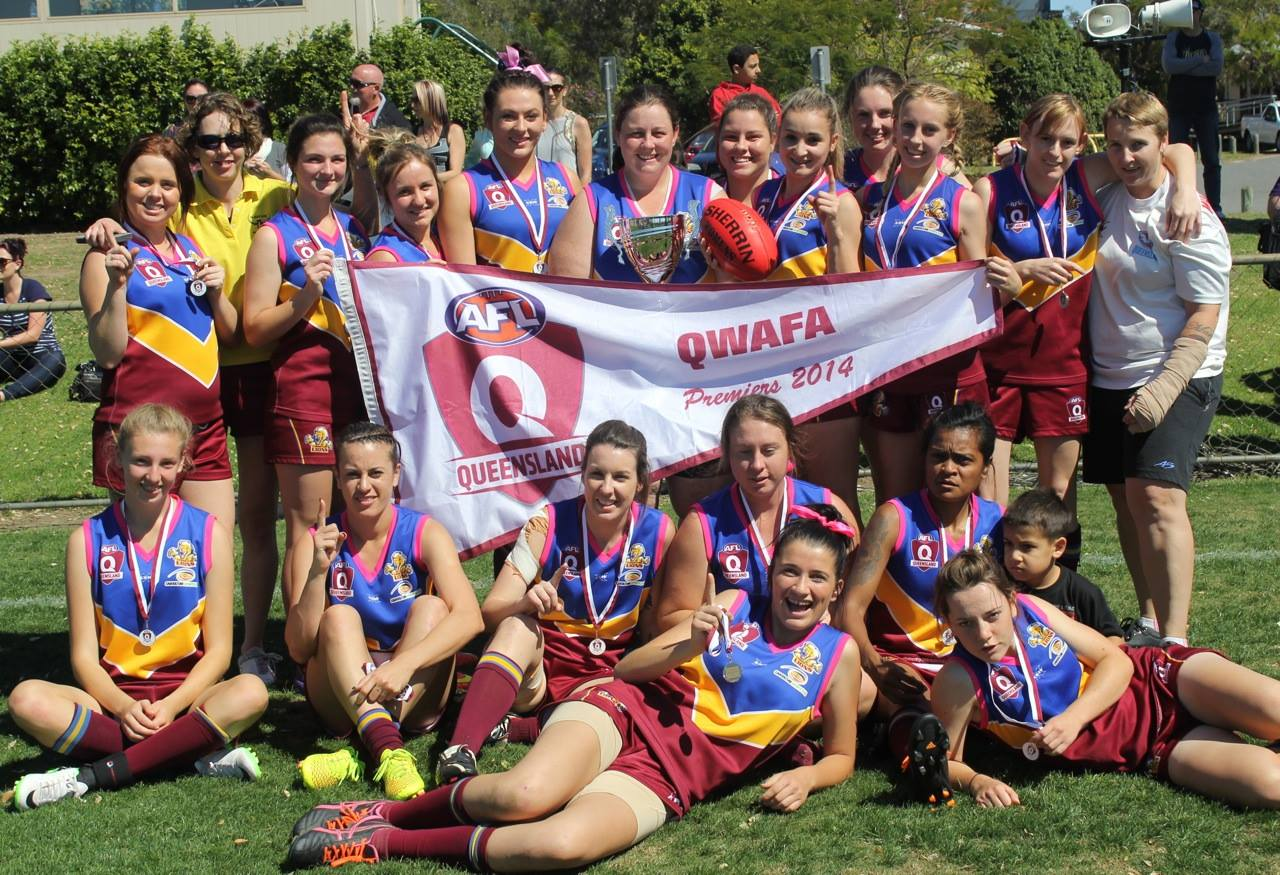
The Caboolture Lions (13.9.87) defeated the Zillmere Eagles (6.9.45) to claim the 2014 QWAFA Premiership.

2019 QFA Division 3

2020 QFA Division 2 North

2021 QFA Division 2 North

2023 QFAW Division 1
