= Redcliffe Tigers =

Names
- Full name: Redcliffe Tigers Australian Rules Football Club
- Nickname(s): Tigers
- Best and fairest: Andrew Kouvaras

Club details
- Founded: 1974; 51 years ago
- Colours
- Competition: AFL Queensland
- President: Gayle Wetzel Fitzgerald
- Coach: Adam Holland
- Ground(s): Nathan rd, kipla-ring, Queensland
- Nathan Road Sports Ground Kippa-Ring, Queensland

Uniforms
Home

Other information
- Official website: redcliffetigers.com.au

Redcliffe Tigers AFC is an Australian rules football club that plays its home games in Rothwell, a suburb of Redcliffe, South East Queensland. The team competes in the SEQAFL Div 2 North Australian rules football competition.

It has had a few playing strip changes in the last couple of years, from the Richmond Tiger playing guernsey to an all-black with a tiger head on the front to an all yellow with a tiger head on the front.

The Tigers have teams in under-8.5s, 9.5s, 10.5s, 11.5s, 12.5s, 14.5s, 15.5s girls, 16.5s, 17s girls, Masters, Reserves, Seniors and Women's who after a long hiatus fielded a side in 2019.

== History ==
The club started in 1974 as the Redcliffe Peninsula Australian Football Club, a junior club with underage boys for the local junior competition.

In 1975, the seniors fielded a team in the SQAFA Division 3 and finished in seventh position. In 1975, the seniors fielded a team in the SQAFA Division 2 and finished in eighth position. A reserve side finished seventh in division 3.

1988 and the club won the SQAFA Division 2 premiership

In 2012, AFL Queensland State Association Division 2 renamed to the South East Queensland Australian Football League (SEQAFL) Division 3.

== Premierships ==
- 1988 – Southern Queensland Australian Football Association Division 2
- 2002 – AFL Queensland State Association Division 2 - Premiers and champions
- 2005 – AFL Queensland State Association Division 1
- 2008 – AFL Queensland State Association Division 2
- 2012 – AFL Queensland State Association Division 3
- 2025 - AFL Queensland State Association Division 2 Reserves
- 2025 - AFL Queensland State Association Division 2 Seniors
