= Springwood Australian Football Club =

Springwood Pumas

Names
- Full name: Springwood Australian Football Club
- Nickname: Pumas

Club details
- Founded: 1972; 54 years ago
- Colours
- Competition: QFA Division 1
- President: Andrew Hickman
- Coach: Todd Reid
- Captain(s): Brighton Page, Nathan Murcutt
- Premierships: 53
- Ground: Lowe Oval

Uniforms
Home

The Springwood Pumas Australian Football Club is an Australian rules football club located in Underwood, a suburb of Logan, Queensland. The club emblem is the puma and the team plays in the Premier Division of the QFA, Division 1.

== History ==
The Club was originally named Springwood Districts Australian Football Club.

Underwood businessman Geoff Thow ran a self-service store and was concerned about local children who congregated outside his shop with little to do. He decided to place an advertisement in the local newspaper to seek support for the formation of a Junior Football Club. The response was sufficient to enable the creation of the club and Thow became its first president.

The club initially fielded three underage sides and eventually attracted more juniors and was thus able to field more teams in all the underage competitions.

By 1979 the club had progressed and fielded a senior team. The club played in the SQAFA 3rd Division. On 13 October 1979 the clubhouse was officially opened.

In 1981 with the addition of a reserve grade side the club was promoted into Division Two.

A reshuffling of clubs in 1986 saw the Springwood Pumas in Division One. After two seasons the club was back in Division Two but not for long, promoted again in 1991.

After the 2000 season an AFLQ reorganization saw Springwood placed in Division Two for 2001. It was in this grade that the club defeated Caboolture 12.13.85 to 9.12.66 to win the 2002 Division two premiership.

2003 and Springwood was back in the Pineapple Hotel Cup competition. After making the Preliminary Final in the 2006 Pineapple Hotel Cup season the club has since slipped down the ladder, suffering a winless 2008 season. The club is in a team rebuilding stage and will compete in the 2012 SEQAFL Division one PHC.

== Premierships ==
2023 2021 2015 2014 2002.

== Notable players ==
- Darren Lockyer
- Alex Sexton
- Derek Wirth
- Tyan Prindable
