= Collingwood Park Australian Football Club =

Collingwood Park Power

Names
- Full name: Collingwood Park Australian Football Club
- Nickname(s): Power

2019 season

Club details
- Founded: 1984; 41 years ago
- Colours
- Competition: QFA
- President: Scott Willoughby
- Coach: Ivan De la Rue
- Ground(s): Moreton Avenue Redbank Plains QLD 4301

Uniforms
Home

Other information
- Official website: Collingwood Park

Collingwood Park Power Australian Football Club (nicknamed "The Power") is an Australian rules football club based in Redbank Plains. The club competes in the AFL Queensland and AFL SEQ Juniors leagues.

The Junior teams participate in the AFL SEQ Juniors competition and caters for boys and girls up to Under 16's, including the Auskick program for skills development of our younger players.

The Senior team (established in 2009) competes in the AFLQ: QFA Community Football competition.

== Origins ==
Collingwood Park Power was established in the mid-1980s as the Moreton-Ipswich Gazelles JAFC Inc.

During 1999, the club became formally known as registered under its new name Collingwood Park Power JAFC and gained permission to wear the Port Adelaide pre season Competition jumper.

In 2007 the club changed its name to Collingwood Park Power Australian Football Club. And in 2010 "The Power" had kicked off their inaugural senior's campaign.

== Life members ==
There are seven life members of the club: Phil Grieger (dec.), Rex Watts, Bert Fahey, Phil Coombs, Kerryn Coombs, Andrew Coombs, Scott Willoughby.
