= Alexandra Hills Australian Football Club =

Alexandra Hills

Names
- Full name: Alexandra Hills Australian Football Club
- Nickname(s): Bombers
- Club song: "It's a grand old flag"

Club details
- Founded: 1980; 45 years ago
- Colours
- Ground(s): Swoosh Oval

Uniforms
Home

Other information
- Official website: alexandrahillsafl.com.au

Alexandra Hills Australian Football Club is an Australian rules football club which competed in the SEQAFL Div 2. The club is now a first division contender.

== History ==
The Alexandra Hills Football Club was formed in 1980, under the original name of "The Capalaba Australian rules Football Club" and debuted in the SQAFA 2nd division in 1981. After the team play in four Grand Finals in four years the club was promoted to division one in 1998, the club stayed until another restructure of the competition saw them placed in QSFL First Division in 2001.

In 2009 they lost the first division Grand Final to Wynnum by 4 points. Another restructure in 2012 has them playing in SEQAFL Division 2.

== Premierships ==
- BAFL Div 2 – 1995, 1996
- QFA Div 2 North Reserves - 2020, 2021, 2022, 2024
- QFA Div 2 North Senior - 2023
