= History of Australian rules football on the Gold Coast =

Australian rules football on the Gold Coast
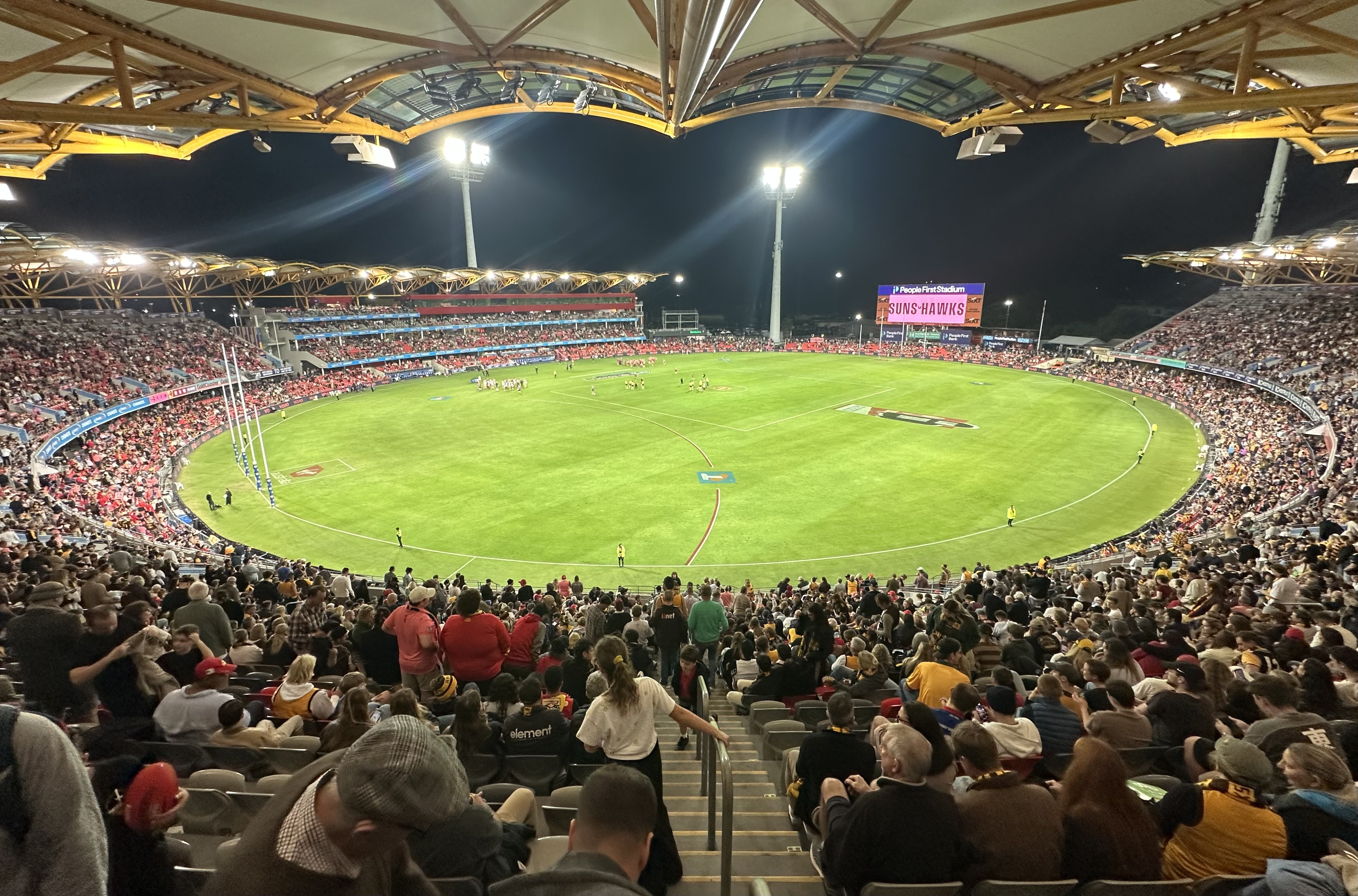
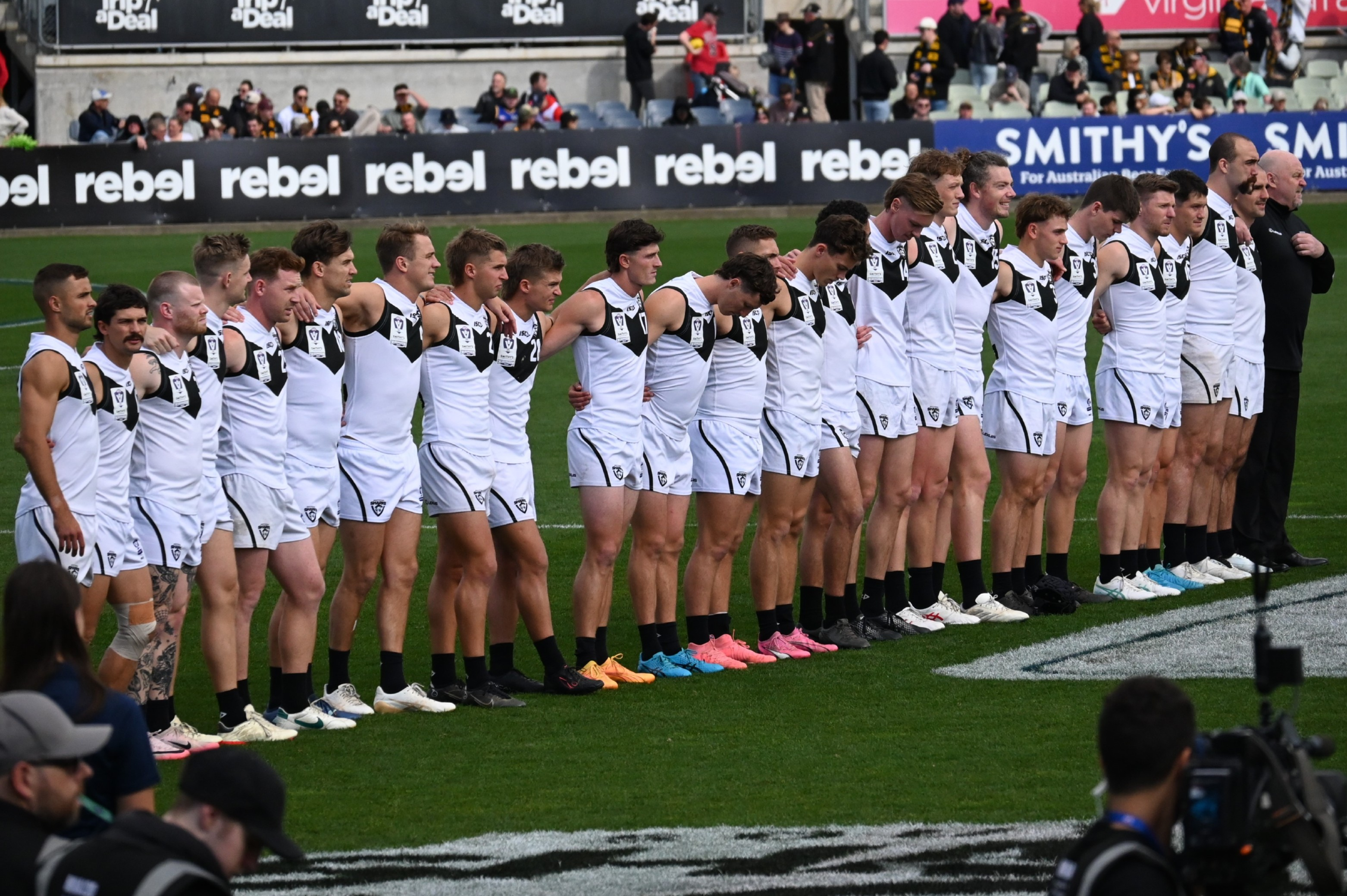
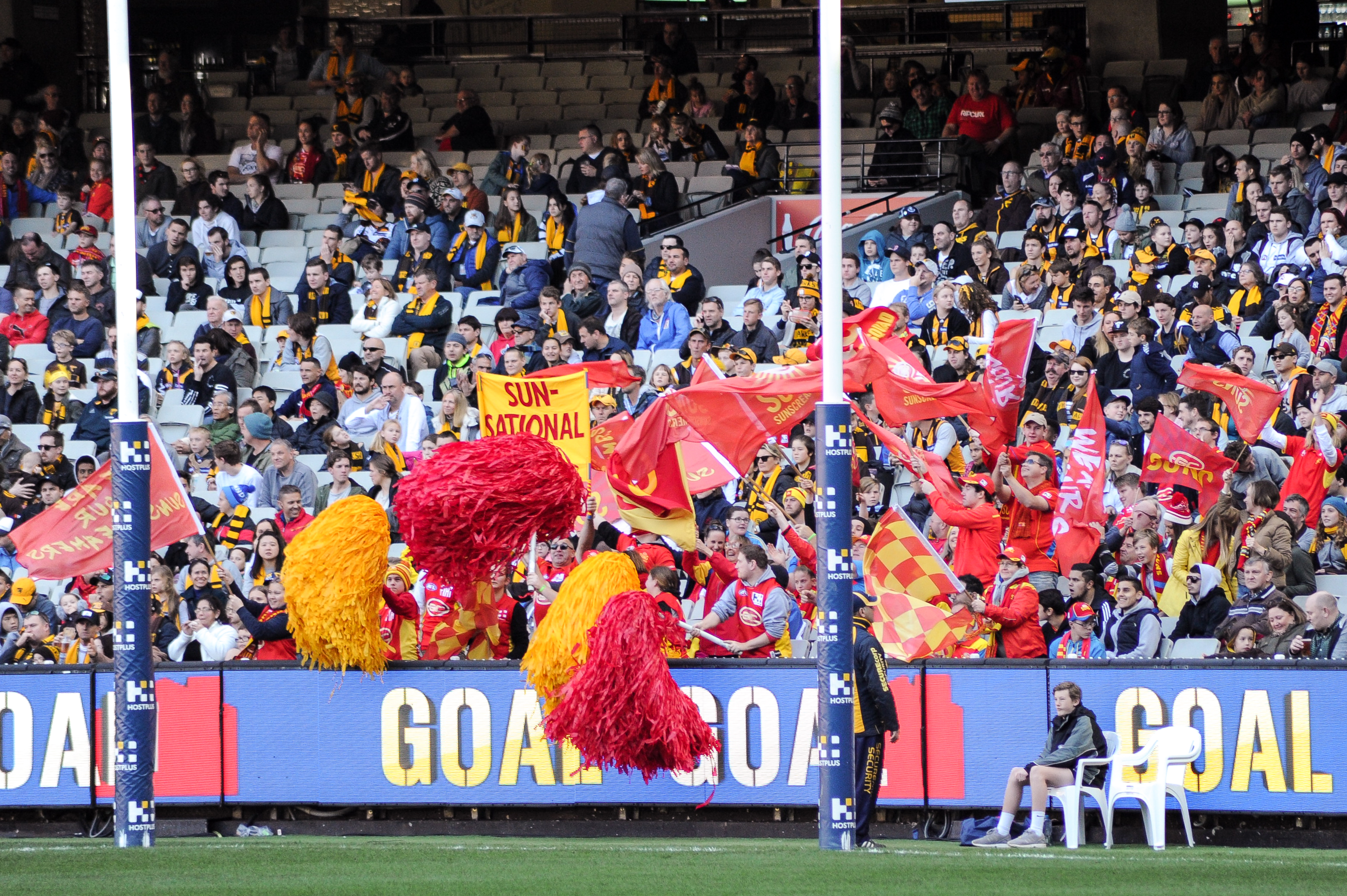
- Carrara Stadium during an AFL match Southport players Gold Coast supporters
- Governing body: AFL Queensland
- First played: 18 May 1961; 65 years ago (GCAFL formation)

On the Gold Coast in Queensland, Australian rules football is a popular spectator and participation sport. Its origins as a senior sport in the region can be traced back to the Gold Coast Australian Football League (GCAFL), which was formed in 1961.

In 2009, the Gold Coast Suns were formed as part of the national expansion of the Australian Football League (AFL), which the club joined in 2011. The Suns plays their home matches at Carrara Stadium, which was redeveloped as part of its entry into the AFL to make it the second-largest stadium by capacity on the Gold Coast (behind Robina Stadium, which is primarily used for rugby league).

The Southport Sharks are the region's most successful club, winning 22 senior-grade men's premierships, including eight in the now-former GCAFL. Since 2021, its men's team has competed in the second-tier Victorian Football League (VFL). Four Gold Coast-based teams – Broadbeach, Labrador, Palm Beach Currumbin and Surfers Paradise – compete in the Queensland Australian Football League (QAFL); Southport and Bond University also compete in the QAFL Women's (QAFLW) competition.

== History ==
=== Gold Coast Australian Football League ===
On 18 May 1961 the Gold Coast Australian Football League was established and four days later the first Australian rules football club on the Gold Coast was formed, Southport Australian Football Club. On 7 June it was revealed the team would be known as the Southport Magpies and would based at Owen Park. The team would also wear the black and white stripes similar to the Collingwood Football Club. In early June a second Gold Coast team was established in Palm Beach and was known as the Central Australian Football Club. On 25 June Southport would play their first game against the Central Football Club at Labrador Sports Reserve. The magpies would come out victorious by 11 points. The game attracts so much attention that a second game was scheduled for 9 July and would be played in Palm Beach and the Centrals would win the second game by 25 points. A third game between the two clubs was played on 23 July and Southport were comfortable winners by 39 points.

The season was temporarily interrupted when a Gold Coast representative side was scheduled to play the Royal Australian Navy team in Palm Beach on 16 August. The Gold Coast team, who were captained by Southport player Ken McDonald, beat the Navy side by 5 points. In August Ipswich had entered the Gold Coast Australian Football League and matches between the three clubs occurred. An inter-district game between Southport and the Ipswich Football Club was scheduled on 25 September at Labrador Sports Ground and was considered the first Gold Coast Australian Football League Grand Final. Southport would claim victory by 13 points to win their first premiership.

Senior football on the Gold Coast became stagnant in 1962 as the Southport Magpies struggled to find any local opposition. The Central Football club had rebranded to Coolangatta at the beginning of the season but faltered and become the Currumbin Australian Football Club by the end of the season. Southport was largely instrumental in the creation of the Surfers Paradise Australian Football Club but the club also failed to become resourceful enough to compete. In an attempt to grow the code, Southport scheduled several showcase matches against Brisbane-based QANFL clubs Enoggera, Mayne, Morningside and University. A junior competition was also started in 1962 and in a stark difference to the senior competition the junior and schools competition enjoyed immense success. The junior competition was such a success that the local paper the South Coast Bulletin would often report on junior matches rather than senior matches. With only two senior clubs based on the Gold Coast, the GCAFL Grand Final was contested between Southport and Currumbin with the Magpies claiming their second consecutive premiership by 53 points.

==== Premiers ====
Gold Coast AFL (1961–1996) / AFLQ - Gold Coast Division (1997–1999)

- 1961: Southport
- 1962: Southport
- 1963: Surfers Paradise
- 1964: Southport
- 1965: Palm Beach/Currumbin
- 1966: Southport
- 1967: Surfers Paradise
- 1968: Surfers Paradise
- 1969: Surfers Paradise
- 1970: Labrador
- 1971: Palm Beach/Currumbin
- 1972: Surfers Paradise
- 1973: Palm Beach/Currumbin
- 1974: Surfers Paradise
- 1975: Southport
- 1976: Southport
- 1977: Southport
- 1978: Coolangatta
- 1979: Southport
- 1980: Southport
- 1981: Coolangatta
- 1982: Coolangatta
- 1983: Coolangatta
- 1984: Surfers Paradise
- 1985: Palm Beach/Currumbin
- 1986: Labrador
- 1987: Broadbeach
- 1988: Coolangatta
- 1989: Coolangatta
- 1990: Surfers Paradise
- 1991: Labrador
- 1992: Surfers Paradise
- 1993: Labrador
- 1994: Labrador
- 1995: Palm Beach/Currumbin
- 1996: Broadbeach
- 1997: Palm Beach/Currumbin
- 1998: Surfers Paradise
- 1999: Palm Beach Currumbin

=== Southport accepted into the QAFL ===
Following a year and a half of applications, Southport would be accepted into the Queensland Australian Football League in 1983. Entry into the league caused a problem with both Southport and the Western Magpies, who shared mascots and guernseys. Southport would rebrand from their Magpies moniker to the Southport Sharks. The Brisbane clubs in the QAFL had long seen the Gold Coast as a lesser competition and weren't expecting Southport to achieve much in the Brisbane-based league. However, the Sharks would send shock waves through the competition when they claimed the QAFL premiership in their debut season with a victory over the Morningside Australian Football Club in the Grand Final. Southport President Dr Alan McKenzie did not miss the opportunity to let the Brisbane clubs know how they felt declaring "For too long Brisbane people have denigrated Gold Coast football. Our win just shows how strong Coast footy is". Meanwhile, in the GCAFL, Coolangatta recorded their third consecutive premiership.

The following season saw Southport struggle to hold on to their premiership players from the previous year and would only retain eleven for the 1984 season. Troubles would transfer to their on field performances as the team lost their first four games of the season. Following a match against Coorparoo in which future VFL player Jason Dunstall starred, the Sharks would win twelve consecutive matches before being eliminated by Morningside in the preliminary final. Once again determined to prove to the Brisbane clubs that Gold Coast football was not a joke, the Sharks would set their eyes on premiership glory again in 1985. Throughout the home and away season the Sharks would only be defeated two times and would reach the Grand Final with a 27-point victory over Mayne in the Major Semifinal. Two weeks later the Sharks would again face Mayne in the Grand Final and with a minute to go, Southport full-forward Glen Middlemiss would kick a goal that would seal a three-point victory. The Sharks would also do the QAFL sweep that season with their reserves and colts teams claiming their respective premierships as well as the senior team winning the midweek Championship.

Southport began the 1986 season with a bang by signing Brownlow Medal winning ruckman Gary Dempsey in an attempt to cover some of the players they had lost. The move would prove successful with the Sharks reaching a second consecutive Grand Final. Despite defeating Coorparoo by 98 points two weeks prior to the Grand Final, the Sharks would fall in the premiership decider by ten points. Unbeknownst to the Sharks, the Gold Coast was about to receive its own VFL football club in 1987.

=== Bears based at Carrara ===
In 1986 the Victorian Football League Commission announced plans to introduce privately owned clubs in Brisbane and Perth. The Brisbane license was awarded to a consortium headed by former actor Paul Cronin and bankrolled by entrepreneur Christopher Skase. It was expected that the newly formed Brisbane Football Club would be based at the Brisbane Cricket Ground, however Skase had other plans for the team. Skase opted for the team to be based out of Carrara Stadium on the Gold Coast and nicknamed the team the 'Bears'. He justified the decision by pointing out that Carrara possessed a ground the same size as the Melbourne Cricket Ground while the Brisbane Cricket Ground had a greyhound track surrounding the field and wasn't suitable for football.

The Bears struggled to attract the interest of high-profile players to join the team for their inaugural season. Billionaire owner Skase decided to open the chequebook and the Bears were able to acquire the services of 1985 Brownlow Medalist Brad Hardie and Collingwood captain Mark Williams. After winning two of their first three away games of the 1987 season, the followers in Queensland were optimistic about the club's future in the lead up to their first home game. The Bears would play their first home game at Carrara Stadium against the Fitzroy Lions in front of a sell out crowd of 17,795.

The Fitzroy Lions would win the encounter by fifteen points. In 1989 the Brisbane Bears and the Albert Shire Council signed off on a 30-year lease for the ground with an option for a further 10 years. Later that year on 15 July the Bears hosted the first ever night match at Carrara against the Geelong Cats in front of a then record crowd of 18,198.

=== Bears move and the impact ===
Insufficient public transport to and from the stadium, as well as the poor on field performance of the Bears, resulted in low crowds at the Bears games and prompted the local media to refer to it as the Curse of Carrara as well as labeling the team the Carrara Koalas or the Bad News Bears. The new owner of the Bears, Reuben Pelerman, would lose a further $10 million between the 1990–1992 AFL seasons. Despite local fans disagreeing with CEO Andrew Ireland, the ever-increasing problems with Carrara Stadium would lead to the Brisbane Bears permanently moving north to the Brisbane Cricket Ground for the 1993 AFL season.

=== Sharks bid to enter the AFL ===
Although interest in the sport had waned on the Gold Coast during the years the Bears were based at Carrara, the Southport Sharks continued to stamp their authority in the QAFL as a powerhouse club. Eight consecutive Grand Finals between 1986 and 1993 showed the club's consistency with premierships years coming in 1987, 1989, 1990 and 1992.

In 1996 the Southport Sharks began bidding for acceptance into the Australian Football League. At the conclusion of the 1996 AFL season it was announced the Brisbane Bears and Fitzroy Lions would merge, leaving a sixteenth spot in the AFL open. The AFL decided to hand the open license to the Port Adelaide Football Club and in the process rejected Southport's bid. Now on a mission to prove the AFL made the wrong decision by not granting them a license, the Sharks would win four consecutive QAFL premierships between 1997 and 2000. This led to the AFL Chief Executive Wayne Jackson stating "I was left with the indelible impression that if ever there was another side outside of a capital, no one else would be in as strong a position as Southport to compete for that. There was nothing like the vibrancy surrounding the Gold Coast. They were the standout (state league) club anywhere around Australia".

=== GCAFL absorbed by QAFL ===
Following the 1996 GCAFL season the league was absorbed by the QAFL state league and created a Gold Coast division for the clubs. In 2000 the Gold Coast division was abolished and teams were assigned to different QAFL divisions according to the strength of each club. Broadbeach and Labrador were admitted into the top division while Burleigh, Coolangatta-Tweed Heads, Palm Beach Currumbin and Surfers Paradise were placed in the second division. Although other Gold Coast clubs had joined the QAFL the Southport Sharks would continue to prove themselves as the Gold Coast's powerhouse club with five consecutive QAFL Grand Final showings between 2004 and 2008, claiming premierships in 2005, 2006 and 2008.

=== AFL push for Gold Coast team ===
By 2004 the city of the Gold Coast had become the sixth most populated city in Australia and had begun to attract the attention of sports leagues around the country. The Southport Sharks continued to bid for a place in the AFL and in August 2004 it was revealed the Sharks attempted to lure the Melbourne Football Club to move to the Gold Coast permanently. The bids would be unsuccessful but a surprise crowd of 16,591 at Carrara to a pre-season match between the Brisbane Lions and Essendon prompted the Australian Football League to act. The AFL scheduled one pre-season match as well as two home and away fixtures at Carrara Stadium in 2006, two of which involved the Brisbane Lions.

The three scheduled games in 2006 would be considered a success which would lead to the North Melbourne Football Club signing a three-year deal to play ten home games at Carrara between 2007 and 2009. Following another successful season of Australian rules football at Carrara, the AFL offered a $100 million package to the North Melbourne Football Club to move to the Gold Coast permanently. With relocation looking likely, James Brayshaw began campaigning for the president position with the slogan 'Keep North at North'. On 7 December 2007 the newly appointed Kangaroos chairman James Brayshaw announced the club would not be moving to the Gold Coast permanently and would continue to be based out of Melbourne.

In January 2008, it was reported that the AFL officially registered the name Gold Coast Football Club Ltd with the Australian Securities and Investments Commission (ASIC). The registration was effective from 24 December 2007. The registration was of a public company limited by guarantees rather than by shares, the corporate personality common to 15 of 16 of the current AFL teams, the exception being the Fremantle Football Club. In March 2008, the AFL won the support of the league's 16 club presidents to establish a side on the Gold Coast and an 18th side in Western Sydney. A bid team known as GC17 consisted of Minter Ellison, head of the largest Australian-based international law firm group, John Witheriff, the Gold Coast chairman, Graeme Downie, an ex-Brisbane Lions president, Dr Alan Mackenzie, president of the Southport Sharks, Dale Dickson, the CEO of the Gold Coast city council and Bob Gordon, a Gold Coast Bulletin editor. In May 2008 it was revealed that Michael Voss had expressed interest in coaching the newly created Gold Coast bid team.

In July AFL CEO Andrew Demetriou made a surprise visit to the Gold Coast in an attempt to help the GC17 bid team gain corporate support. In August 2008 the GC17 bid team hired former West Coast Eagles captain Guy McKenna to be the inaugural coach of the team as well as former Brisbane Lions players Shaun Hart and Marcus Ashcroft as assistants. The deadline for the team to reach the AFL requirements occurred in October 2008 and the GC17 bid fulfilled all the criteria.

The last hurdle the GC17 bid team faced would come down to whether the Queensland Labor Party would be re-elected in the 2009 state election. With 42,000 supporters signed up and 110 sponsors already committed, the final roadblock would involve the Queensland Labor Party's $60 million redevelopment of Carrara Stadium that would occur if they won the election. The Queensland Labor Party would win the 2009 election and in doing so secured the AFL license for the GC17 bid team. On 31 March 2009 AFL Chief Executive Andrew Demetriou announced that the Gold Coast bid team had been granted an AFL license to enter the league in 2011 and become the seventeenth team.

=== Gold Coast Football Club ===
Following the announcement that the GC17 bid team had been granted an AFL license, it was revealed the new team would be called the Gold Coast Football Club and would play their 2009 season in the TAC Cup. The club shocked many on 29 July 2009 when they signed Queensland Rugby League player Karmichael Hunt from the Brisbane Broncos to a three-year deal. After a season of mixed results the Gold Coast Football Club would finish fifth on the ladder with a record of ten wins, seven losses and one draw. In the team's first finals match they faced the Northern Knights at Visy Park and would come out victorious by fourteen points. They would then be eliminated in the semifinals by the Geelong Falcons.

During the 2009 off season the Gold Coast Football Club would make major inroads by signing Geelong Cats premiership play Nathan Ablett, former North Melbourne player Daniel Harris and former Collingwood duo Danny Stanley and Sam Iles. The team was also allowed to sign up to twelve 17-year-old players from around the country. On 22 July 2010 it was revealed during a Rise Up function at the Southport Sharks that the new Gold Coast AFL team would be known as the Gold Coast Suns. The club's guernsey and song were also revealed on the night. The club's 2010 VFL season would prove to be not as successful as the season before, only recording five wins and finishing tenth on the ladder. Meanwhile, in the QAFL the Labrador Tigers reached the Grand Final, the first Gold Coast team to do outside of Southport. The Tigers would lose the final by 22 points.

On 17 August 2010 it was revealed the Gold Coast Suns had signed their first AFL contracted player in the form of Nathan Bock. Signings of Campbell Brown, Josh Fraser, Jarrod Harbrow and Michael Rischitelli would follow before the biggest signing in the club's short history. On 29 September 2010 the club announced the signing of two time premiership player and 2009 Brownlow medalist Gary Ablett Jr. On 2 April 2011 the Gold Coast Suns made their historic AFL debut against the Carlton Football Club, they were beaten soundly by 119 points. Three weeks later the Suns would record their first AFL win over the Port Adelaide Football Club by three points in Adelaide. The Suns would only taste victory two more times that season to compile a win–loss record of 3-19 en route to collecting the wooden spoon.

In the Suns second AFL season the club would go on a fifteen match losing streak to begin the season with many media outlets putting it down to the second year blues. The losing streak was snapped with a goal after the siren victory against Richmond in Cairns. The team would then finish the season off strongly with two home wins against Greater Western Sydney and Carlton. They would finish the year with the same record of 3–19, finishing second last on the ladder.

== Current Gold Coast Australian Football League Clubs ==
=== Current clubs ===
Football Club	Nickname	Colors	Founded	Location	Ground	Current Competition
Gold Coast (R)	Suns		2008	Carrara	Carrara Stadium	Victorian; Football League
Gold Coast (S)	Suns		2011	Carrara	Carrara Stadium	Australian; Football League
Broadbeach	Cats		1971	Mermaid Waters	H & A Oval	Queensland Australian; Football League
Labrador	Tigers		1964	Labrador	Cooke-Murphy Oval	Queensland Australian; Football League
Southport	Sharks		1961	Southport	Fankhauser Reserve	Victorian; Football League
Burleigh	Bombers		c. 1979	Burleigh Waters	Bill Godfrey Oval	Queensland Football; Association Division 1
Coolangatta; Tweed Heads	Blues		1962	Coolangatta	Len Peak Oval	Queensland Football; Association Division 2
Palm Beach; Currumbin	Lions		1961	Palm Beach	Salk Oval	Queensland Australian; Football League
Surfers Paradise	Demons		1962	Benowa	Sir Bruce Small Park	Queensland Australian; Football League
Robina	Roos		1995	Robina	Scottsdale Drive	Queensland Football; Association Division 2
Carrara	Saints		2012	Carrara	Alan Neilsen Oval	Queensland Football; Association Division 2
Coomera	Magpies		2009	Coomera	Coomera Sports Park	Queensland Football; Association Division 2
Bond Uni.	Bullsharks		1987	Robina	Scottsdale Drive	Queensland Football; Association Division 2
Ormeau	Bulldogs		2009	Ormeau	Ormeau Sports Park	Queensland Football; Association Division 3

- (S) = Seniors
- (R) = Reserves

=== Former clubs ===
Gold Coast Australian Football Club	Colors	Founded	Location	Ground	Competition
Beenleigh Buffaloes (Note: In 2008 Beenleigh broke away from the Gold Coast City Council and became a part of the Logan City Council.)		1997	Beenleigh	Dauth Park	Queensland Football; Association Division 1

== Grounds ==
=== Carrara Stadium ===
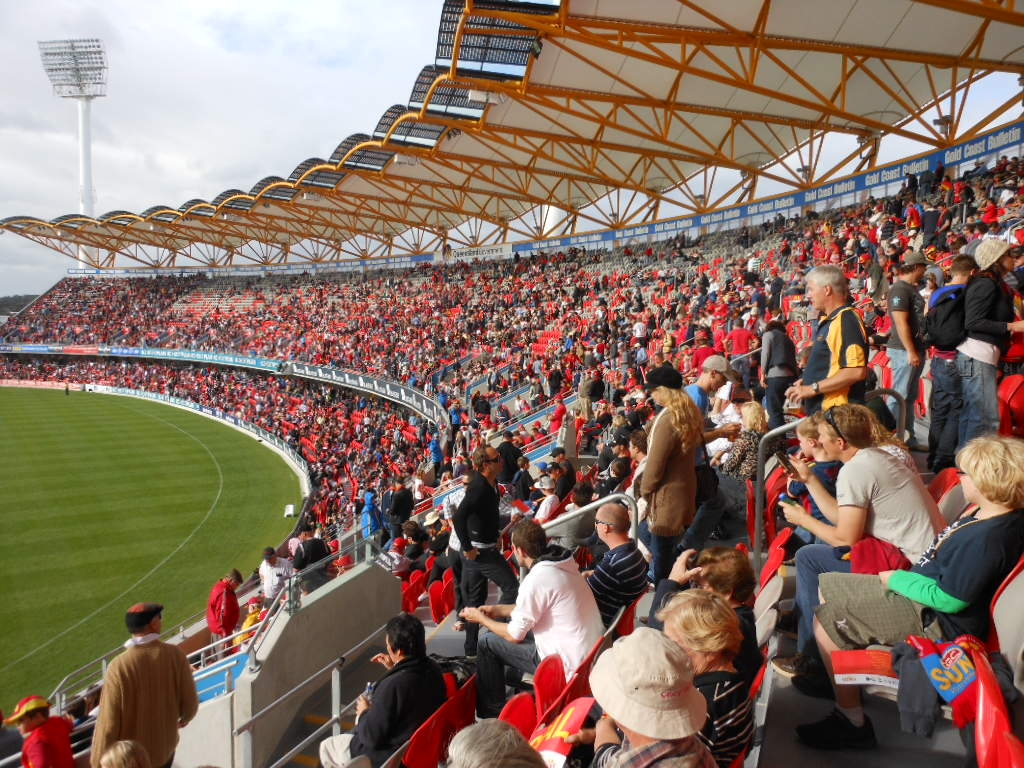
Carrara Stadium's stands post 2010/11 upgrade.

In early 1987, Brisbane Bears financial backer Christopher Skase, would fund a redevelopment of Carrara Stadium to feature makeshift stands. In 1989 Skase would orchestrate the installment of $6 million flood lights in order to allow the Bears to host night games. The Bears announced in late 1992 that they would be moving away from Carrara permanently, instead opting for the Gabba in Brisbane.

Australian rules football would not return at a professional level until 2006 when 8,258 fans saw the Melbourne Demons hosted the Adelaide Crows in Round 3 of the 2006 AFL season. Four rounds later Queensland's own Brisbane Lions and the Hawthorn Hawks clashed in front of 12,315 spectators. The two games were deemed a success and in late 2006 the North Melbourne Kangaroos signed a three-year deal with the AFL to play ten home games out of Carrara. Following another successful season of Australian rules football at Carrara, the AFL offered a $100 million package to the North Melbourne Football Club to move to the Gold Coast permanently but North under President James Bradshaw's leadership rejected the offer.

Over these years Carrara Stadium also played host to several QAFL Grand Finals involving the Southport Sharks. On 7 May 2009 a $144.2 million upgrade of Carrara Stadium began to accommodate the new Gold Coast Football Club upon entry into the AFL in 2011. The site would be demolished with only the six flood lights remaining from the previous stadium. The newly upgraded stadium would hold 25,000 seats with the ability to be upgraded to 40,000 seats if needed.

=== List of VFL/AFL games played at Carrara ===
VFL/AFL games at Carrara Stadium

No.	Year	Rd	Home team	Score		Away team	Score	Crowd	Date
1	1987	4	Brisbane	16.18 (114)	def by	Fitzroy	20.9 (129)	17,795	Sun, 19 April
2	1987	5	Brisbane	12.14 (86)	def	Melbourne	12.9 (81)	7,451	Sun, 26 April
3	1987	8	Brisbane	22.12 (144)	def	Richmond	15.19 (109)	7,944	Sun, 17 May
4	1987	11	Brisbane	9.10 (64)	def by	Sydney	19.23 (137)	11,840	Sun, 7 June
5	1987	12	Brisbane	11.4 (70)	def by	Hawthorn	24.21 (165)	7,284	Sun, 14 June
6	1987	14	Brisbane	17.11 (113)	def by	North Melbourne	23.13 (151)	7,716	Sun, 28 June
7	1987	15	Brisbane	18.11 (119)	def by	Geelong	10.18 (78)	9,380	Sun, 5 July
8	1987	16	Brisbane	14.9 (93)	def by	St Kilda	18.13 (121)	9,106	Sun, 12 July
9	1987	19	Brisbane	11.11 (77)	def by	Collingwood	14.16 (100)	9,166	Sun, 9 August
10	1987	20	Brisbane	18.11 (119)	def by	West Coast	21.14 (140)	4,859	Sun, 16 August
11	1987	21	Brisbane	10.11 (71)	def by	Footscray	22.21 (153)	6,754	Sun, 23 August
12	1988	1	Brisbane	10.15 (75)	def by	Collingwood	11.17 (83)	11,306	Sun, 3 April
13	1988	6	Brisbane	17.11 (113)	def	Fitzroy	16.15 (111)	9,981	Sun, 8 May
14	1988	7	Brisbane	10.12 (72)	def	Footscray	9.17 (71)	10,898	Sun, 15 May
15	1988	10	Brisbane	16.13 (109)	def by	Geelong	24.18 (162)	8,637	Sun, 5 June
16	1988	11	Brisbane	23.13 (151)	def	Richmond	15.13 (103)	13,222	Sun, 12 June
17	1988	14	Brisbane	14.15 (99)	def	St Kilda	12.17 (89)	10,394	Sun, 3 July
18	1988	15	Brisbane	12.19 (91)	def by	Hawthorn	17.13 (115)	14,213	Sun, 10 July
19	1988	17	Brisbane	10.14 (74)	def by	Essendon	16.7 (103)	15,950	Sun, 24 July
20	1988	21	Brisbane	14.13 (97)	def by	Carlton	13.22 (100)	16,727	Sun, 21 August
21	1988	22	Brisbane	11.11 (77)	def by	Sydney	10.21 (81)	12,718	Sun, 28 August
22	1989	2	Brisbane	18.15 (123)	def	Sydney	8.17 (65)	11,405	Sun, 9 April
23	1989	5	Brisbane	10.13 (73)	def by	West Coast	19.11 (125)	9,694	Sun, 30 April
24	1989	6	Brisbane	8.11 (59)	def	Footscray	6.15 (51)	5,134	Sun, 7 May
25	1989	7	Brisbane	12.9 (81)	def by	Essendon	17.10 (112)	12,034	Sun, 14 May
26	1989	12	Brisbane	18.6 (114)	def by	Fitzroy	19.14 (128)	10,008	Sun, 18 June
27	1989	14	Brisbane	14.15 (99)	def by	Melbourne	17.11 (113)	8,799	Sun, 9 July
28	1989	15	Brisbane	11.11 (77)	def by	Geelong	22.19 (151)	18,198	Sat, 15 July
29	1989	16	Brisbane	14.10 (94)	def	St Kilda	12.18 (90)	11,004	Sat, 22 July
30	1989	18	Brisbane	25.17 (167)	def	North Melbourne	12.12 (84)	9,606	Sat, 5 August
31	1989	20	Brisbane	12.5 (77)	def	Hawthorn	9.7 (61)	9,093	Sun, 20 August
32	1989	22	Brisbane	15.15 (105)	def	Carlton	10.10 (70)	15,409	Sun, 3 September
33	1990	1	Brisbane	19.19 (133)	def	Richmond	10.14 (74)	11,814	Sat, 31 March
34	1990	3	Brisbane	14.11 (95)	def by	North Melbourne	17.11 (113)	8,683	Sun, 15 April
35	1990	5	Brisbane	8.13 (61)	def by	Melbourne	19.11 (125)	9,381	Sat, 28 April
36	1990	7	Brisbane	14.12 (96)	def	Sydney	13.10 (88)	7,226	Sun, 13 May
37	1990	9	Brisbane	8.8 (56)	def by	Footscray	19.11 (125)	6,628	Sat, 26 May
38	1990	11	Brisbane	10.13 (73)	def by	Collingwood	15.17 (107)	12,339	Sun, 10 June
39	1990	13	Brisbane	7.13 (55)	def by	Essendon	15.19 (109)	10,105	Sat, 23 June
40	1990	15	Brisbane	17.9 (111)	def	Fitzroy	9.8 (62)	10,105	Sun, 15 July
41	1990	17	Brisbane	14.11 (95)	def by	Hawthorn	16.14 (110)	8,768	Sun, 29 July
42	1990	19	Brisbane	25.13 (163)	def	Geelong	14.13 (97)	8,180	Sat, 11 August
43	1990	21	Brisbane	8.11 (59)	def by	West Coast	14.16 (100)	7,286	Sun, 26 August
44	1991	2	Brisbane	8.10 (58)	def by	North Melbourne	15.14 (104)	5,724	Sat, 30 March
45	1991	6	Brisbane	12.11 (83)	def by	Essendon	16.18 (114)	9,253	Sat, 27 April
46	1991	10	Brisbane	10.15 (75)	def by	Richmond	12.10 (82)	7,330	Sun, 26 May
47	1991	12	Brisbane	14.9 (93)	def by	West Coast	21.19 (145)	5,728	Sun, 9 June
48	1991	18	Brisbane	14.16 (100)	def	Carlton	12.21 (93)	9,735	Sun, 21 July
49	1991	20	Brisbane	10.11 (71)	def by	Collingwood	26.16 (172)	9,302	Sat, 3 August
50	1991	24	Brisbane	8.14 (62)	def by	Footscray	14.14 (98)	4,721	Sat, 31 August

No.	Year	Rd	Home team	Score		Away team	Score	Crowd	Date
51	1992	1	Brisbane	10.8 (68)	def by	Carlton	13.14 (92)	9,066	Sat, 21 March
52	1992	3	Brisbane	11.16 (82)	def	Fitzroy	8.10 (58)	3,876	Sun, 5 April
53	1992	5	Brisbane	14.8 (92)	drew with	West Coast	13.14 (92)	6,923	Sat, 18 April
54	1992	7	Brisbane	11.9 (75)	def by	Geelong	37.17 (239)	7,645	Sun, 3 May
55	1992	9	Brisbane	6.6 (42)	def by	Footscray	11.18 (84)	3,059	Sun, 17 May
56	1992	12	Brisbane	16.7 (103)	def	Melbourne	11.11 (77)	4,902	Sun, 7 June
57	1992	13	Brisbane	12.13 (85)	def by	Essendon	18.11 (119)	6,442	Sun, 14 June
58	1992	15	Brisbane	15.14 (104)	def by	Hawthorn	16.12 (108)	7,573	Sun, 28 June
59	1992	17	Brisbane	9.10 (64)	def by	Collingwood	14.19 (103)	13,053	Sat, 11 July
60	1992	21	Brisbane	11.11 (77)	def by	Adelaide	17.8 (110)	4,603	Sun, 9 August
61	1992	23	Brisbane	19.15 (129)	def	Sydney	9.16 (70)	4,349	Sat, 22 August
62	2006	3	Melbourne	14.13 (97)	def by	Adelaide	15.14 (104)	8,258	Sun, 16 April
63	2006	7	Hawthorn	9.12 (66)	def by	Brisbane	16.10 (106)	12,315	Sat, 13 May
64	2007	4	North Melbourne	12.15 (87)	def	Brisbane	8.15 (63)	11,133	Sat, 21 April
65	2007	8	North Melbourne	22.15 (147)	def	Carlton	20.10 (130)	11,647	Sat, 19 May
66	2007	12	North Melbourne	7.12 (54)	def by	Adelaide	15.10 (100)	11,178	Sat, 16 June
67	2008	8	North Melbourne	13.11 (89)	def	West Coast	12.11 (83)	6,354	Sat, 17 May
68	2008	14	North Melbourne	19.15 (69)	def by	St Kilda	12.12 (84)	9,128	Sat, 28 June
69	2008	18	North Melbourne	13.14 (92)	def	Brisbane	11.18 (84)	10,037	Sat, 2 August
70	2009	7	Carlton	11.15 (81)	def by	Fremantle	13.10 (88)	10,294	Sat, 9 May
71	2009	10	St Kilda	11.17 (83)	def	Melbourne	6.10 (46)	9,112	Sat, 30 May
72	2009	14	Richmond	13.7 (85)	def by	Adelaide	15.12 (102)	11,174	Sat, 4 July
73	2011	10	Gold Coast	10.13 (73)	def by	Geelong	21.13 (139)	21,485	Sat, 28 May
74	2011	12	Gold Coast	9.9 (63)	def by	North Melbourne	18.14 (122)	14,945	Sat, 11 June
75	2011	14	Gold Coast	13.10 (88)	def by	Footscray	17.8 (110)	16,149	Sat, 25 June
76	2011	16	Gold Coast	4.12 (36)	def by	Sydney	15.16 (106)	16,488	Sat, 9 July
77	2011	18	Gold Coast	11.9 (75)	def by	Collingwood	19.15 (129)	23,302	Sat, 23 July
78	2011	19	Gold Coast	6.18 (54)	def by	St Kilda	10.14 (74)	17,482	Sat, 30 July
79	2011	22	Gold Coast	9.10 (64)	def by	Adelaide	18.17 (125)	16,168	Sat, 20 August
80	2011	24	Gold Coast	14.13 (97)	def by	Hawthorn	16.10 (106)	19,314	Sat, 3 September
81	2012	1	Gold Coast	10.8 (68)	def by	Adelaide	19.23 (137)	12,790	Sat, 31 March
82	2012	3	Gold Coast	13.10 (88)	def by	Essendon	15.15 (105)	17,069	Sat, 14 April
83	2012	6	Gold Coast	14.3 (87)	def by	Fremantle	14.10 (94)	11,670	Sat, 5 May
84	2012	9	Gold Coast	10.10 (70)	def by	Port Adelaide	17.16 (118)	12,416	Sat, 26 May
85	2012	11	Gold Coast	7.7 (49)	def by	St Kilda	21.18 (144)	12,534	Sat, 9 June
86	2012	11	Gold Coast	12.8 (80)	def by	North Melbourne	11.21 (87)	10,170	Sat, 16 June
87	2012	15	Gold Coast	13.18 (96)	def by	Geelong	15.20 (110)	15,824	Sun, 8 July
88	2012	17	Gold Coast	5.18 (48)	def by	Brisbane	8.11 (59)	16,550	Sat, 21 July
89	2012	18	Gold Coast	8.6 (54)	def by	Sydney	19.12 (126)	11,169	Sat, 28 July
90	2012	20	Gold Coast	16.13 (109)	def	GWS	12.7 (79)	14,657	Sat, 11 August
91	2012	22	Gold Coast	15.8 (98)	def	Carlton	11.20 (86)	15,251	Sat, 25 August

== Rivalries ==
=== QClash ===
The QClash is the name for a rivalry between the Gold Coast Suns and the Brisbane Lions that began in the 2011 AFL season. On May 7, 2011, the Gold Coast won the first QClash played at the Gabba by eight points. The Lions would even the score in the second QClash, again played at the Gabba. In 2012 Brisbane would get the better of the Gold Coast in both QClashes. The ledger between the two clubs currently stands at 3–1 in favour of Brisbane.

=== Broadbeach vs Southport ===
The most intense rivalry in local Queensland football exists between the neighbouring clubs in the form of the Southport Sharks and the Broadbeach Cats and stretches back to their first meeting in 1971. Matches between the two teams generally result in a larger audience and a heated contest on the field. The rivalry reached boiling point in 1999 when the Sharks successfully lured future AFL number 1 draft pick Nick Riewoldt from the Cats. As of the completion of the 2013 NEAFL season the win–loss–draw record between the two clubs stands at 70-10-0 in favour of the Sharks.

== Notable AFL players from the Gold Coast ==
Player	Junior Club/s	AFL Club/s	Playing Years	Notes
Michael Voss	Morningside	Brisbane	1992-2006	1996 Brownlow Medal Winner.; 2002-2003 Leigh Matthews Trophy Winner.; A Merrett–Murray Medal winner in 1996, 1997, 2000–2002.; A premiership player with Brisbane in 2001, 2002, 2003.; Played in the 2004 AFL Grand Final.
Nick Riewoldt	Broadbeach; Southport	St Kilda	2001-2017	Riewoldt was the number 1 draft pick in the 2000 AFL draft.; 2004 Leigh Matthews Trophy winner.; A Trevor Barker Award winner in 2002, 2004, 2006, 2007, 2009, 2014.; Played in the 2009 AFL Grand Final.; Played in the 2010 AFL Grand Final.
David Hale	Coolangatta; Broadbeach	North Melbourne; Hawthorn	2003-2015	Hale was the number 7 draft pick in the 2002 AFL draft.; A premiership player with Hawthorn in 2013, 2014, 2015.; Played in the 2012 AFL Grand Final.
Marcus Ashcroft	Surfers Paradise; Southport	Brisbane	1989-2003	A premiership player with Brisbane in 2001, 2002, 2003.
Clark Keating	Surfers Paradise	Brisbane	1996-2006	A premiership player with Brisbane in 2001, 2002, 2003.; Played in the 2004 AFL Grand Final.
Dayne Beams	Mudgereeba; Southport	Collingwood; Brisbane	2009-2020	A premiership player with Collingwood in 2010.; A Copeland Trophy winner in 2012.; A Merrett–Murray Medal winner in 2015.
Dayne Zorko	Surfers Paradise; Broadbeach	Collingwood; Brisbane	2012-	A Merrett–Murray Medal winner in 2015–2018, 2021.
Michael Osborne	Labrador	Hawthorn	2001-2013	A premiership player with Hawthorn in 2008.
Brent Renouf	Surfers Paradise; Southport	Hawthorn; Port Adelaide	2007-2014	A premiership player with Hawthorn in 2008.
Kurt Tippett	Southport	Adelaide; Sydney	2007-2019	Adelaide leading goalkicker in 2010.; Played in the 2014 AFL Grand Final.; Played in the 2016 AFL Grand Final.
Sam Gilbert	Coolangatta; Southport	St Kilda	2006-2018	Played in the 2009 AFL Grand Final.; Played in the 2010 AFL Grand Final.
Will Ashcroft	Broadbeach; Southport	Brisbane	2023-	Ashcroft was the number 2 draft pick in the 2022 AFL draft.

== Junior Gold Coast Clubs ==
Club	Suburb	Ground
Beaudesert Brumbies	Beaudesert	Field of Dreams
Broadbeach Cats	Mermaid Waters	H & A Oval
Burleigh Bombers	Burleigh Waters	Bill Godfrey Oval
Carrara Saints	Carrara	Alan Neilsen Oval
Coolangatta Tweed Heads Blues	Coolangatta	Lean Peak Oval
Coomera Magpies	Coomera	Coomera Sports Park
Fassifern Falcons	Fassifern Valley	Kalbar Showgrounds
Labrador Tigers	Labrador	Cooke-Murphy Oval
Mudgeeraba Spartans	Mudgeeraba	Somerset College sports oval
Ormeau Bulldogs	Ormeau	Ormeau Sports Park
Pacific Pines Power	Pacific Pines	Gum Park
Palm Beach Currumbin Lions	Palm Beach	Salk Oval
Southport Sharks	Southport	Fankhauser Reserve
Surfers Paradise Demons	Benowa	Sir Bruce Small Park
Tamborine Hawks	Mount Tamborine	-

== See also ==
- Sport in Queensland
- Sports on the Gold Coast, Queensland
