= Northern Territory Thunder =

NT Thunder

Names
- Full name: Northern Territory Football Club
- Nickname: NT Thunder

2017 season
- After finals: 5th
- Home-and-away season: 5th
- Leading goalkicker: Darren Ewing (61 goals)
- Best and fairest: Cameron Ilett

Club details
- Founded: 2008; 18 years ago
- Dissolved: 13 September 2019
- Colours: Black Ochre Yellow White
- Competition: NEAFL: Men's; VFLW: Women's
- Chairperson: Lincoln Jenkin
- Coach: Andrew Hodges
- Captain: Shannon Rioli
- Premierships: 2 (2011, 2015)
- Grounds: Marrara Oval, Darwin (capacity: 12,000)
- Traeger Park, Alice Springs (capacity: 10,000)

Uniforms
Home	Away

Other information
- Official website: ntthunder.com.au

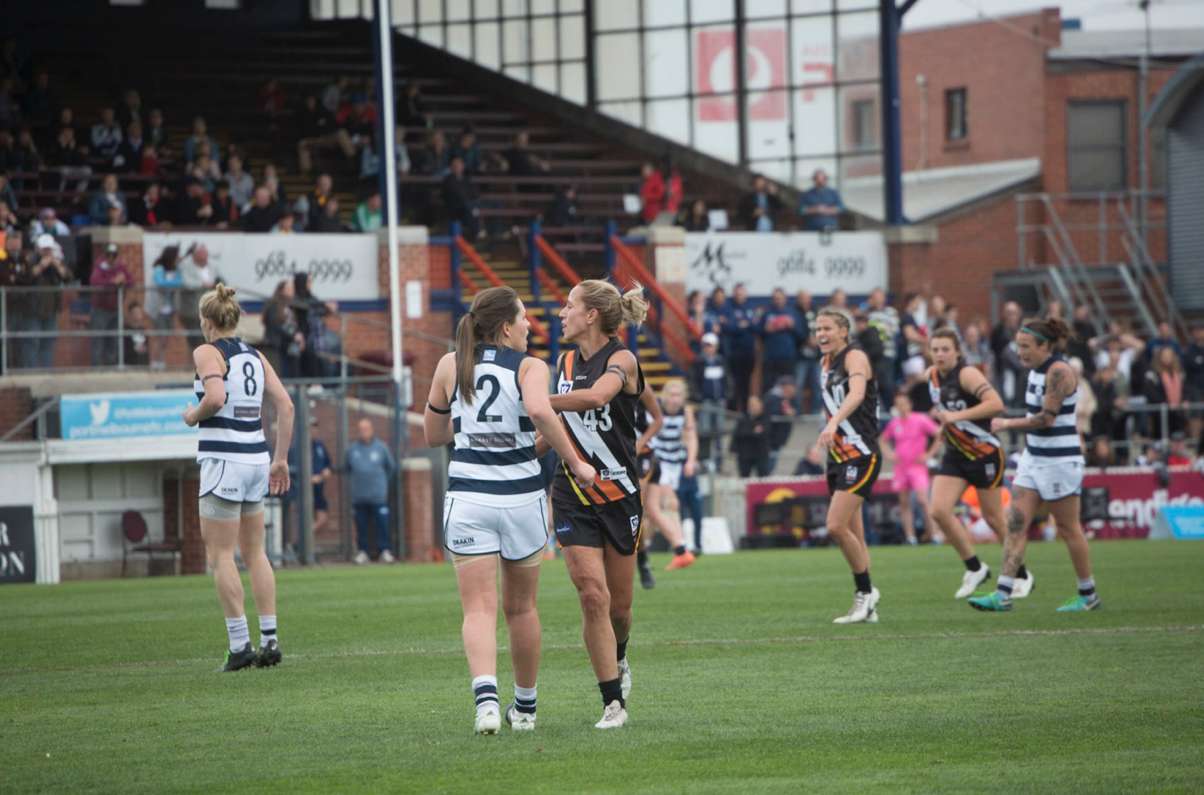
NT Thunder and Geelong Cats in the 2018 VFL Women's finals series

The Northern Territory Football Club, nicknamed NT Thunder, was a Northern Territory-based Australian rules football club that competed in the North East Australian Football League (NEAFL) between 2011 and 2019, and the VFL Women's between 2018 and 2019.

The club was disbanded at the end of the 2019 season, however its identity continues to be seen in the under-19s Talent League Boys and Talent League Girls competitions, where the Northern Territory Academy plays a handful of games each year.

== History ==
NT Thunder was formed in 2008 and were invited to join the West Australian Football League, but instead opted to join the Queensland Australian Football League (QAFL). At the conclusion of the 2010 QAFL season, the Thunder were invited to join the newly formed North East Australian Football League (NEAFL).

The Thunder finished the regular season with the best record in the Northern Conference and in doing so claimed their first ever minor premiership. The Thunder went on to prove their superiority by claiming the first ever Northern Conference NEAFL premiership by defeating the Morningside Panthers. A week later the Thunder defeated the newly crowned Eastern Conference NEAFL premiers, Ainslie Tri-Colours, to claim the first ever NEAFL premiership at Traeger Park.

The Thunder won two NEAFL premierships and entered a side in the VFL Women's competition in Victoria. By the end of the 2019 season, AFL Northern Territory revealed it could no longer justify keeping the club afloat, and announced its cessation from both competitions.

== Honour board ==
Legend:
^ Premiers, † Finals
Bold italics: competition leading goal kicker

Season	Position	Chairman	CEO	Coach	Captain(s)	Best and fairest	Leading goalkicker (total)
2009	6th	Paul Tyrell	Stuart Totham	Michael McLean	Jarred Ilett	Cameron Ilett	Darren Ewing (81)
2010	4th†	Paul Tyrell	Stuart Totham	Murray Davis	Jarred Ilett	Cameron Ilett	Darren Ewing (78)
2011	1st^	Paul Tyrell	Stuart Totham	Murray Davis	Cameron Ilett	Jake Dignan	Darren Ewing (115)
2012	3rd†	Lincoln Jenkin	Jarred Ilett	Daniel Archer	Cameron Ilett	Jason Roe	Darren Ewing (64)
2013	7th	Lincoln Jenkin	Jarred Ilett	Daniel Archer	Cameron Ilett	Cameron Ilett	Darren Ewing (94)
2014	4th†	Lincoln Jenkin	Jarred Ilett	Xavier Clarke	Cameron Ilett/Aaron Motlop	Cameron Ilett	Darren Ewing (73)
2015	1st^	Lincoln Jenkin	Brendan Curry	Xavier Clarke	Aaron Motlop	Richard Tambling	Darren Ewing (87)
2016	5th†	Lincoln Jenkin	—N/a	Xavier Clarke	Shannon Rioli	Cameron Ilett	Darren Ewing (58)
2017	5th†	Lincoln Jenkin	—N/a	Andrew Hodges	Shannon Rioli	Cameron Ilett	Darren Ewing (61)

== Honours and achievements ==
=== Premierships ===
2011 NEAFL Grand Final
Saturday, 24 September (2:00 pm)	NT Thunder	def.	Ainslie	Traeger Park
5.4 (34); 9.11 (65); 11.14 (80); 16.18 (114)	Q1; Q2; Q3; Final	6.4 (40); 9.7 (61); 10.12 (72); 13.14 (92)	Andrew Ireland Medal: Cameron Ilett (NT Thunder)
D. Ewing 5, A. McLeod 3, W. Farrer 3, C. Ilett 2, J. Dignan, R. Smith, R. Tungatalum	Goals	M. Crook 3, M. Lawless 3, B. Hughes 2, N. Paine 2, A. vandenBerg, D. Walker, C. Mathis
C. Ilett, S. Tapp, A. Motlop, K. Tyrrell, L. Egger, J. Dignan	Best	D. Tow, M. Crook, B. Hughes, R. Tutt, R. Shirley, R. Tuohey

2015 NEAFL Grand Final
Saturday, 19 September (6:30 pm)	NT Thunder	def.	Aspley	TIO Stadium (crowd: 5,889)	Report
3.2 (20); 6.8 (44); 10.10 (70); 11.15 (81)	Q1; Q2; Q3; Final	1.3 (9); 4.10 (34); 6.11 (47); 11.14 (80)	Umpires: Alex Whetton, Cameron Barr, James Waldorff; Andrew Ireland Medal: Chris Dunne (NT Thunder)
C .Dunne 4, D. Ewing 3, M. Hagan, J. Lockwood, G. Turner, L. Patrick	Goals	E. Hipwood 2, C. French 2, T. Dickinson, G. Grose, M. Payne, C. Stevenson, N. Jackson, E. Sansbury, J. Neils
B. Rioli, C. Dunne, D. Ewing, C. Ilett, J. Beugelaar, T. Motlop	Best	M. Payne, M. Hutchinson, J. Wagner, C. Stiller, J. Williams, G. Grose

=== Club Champions ===
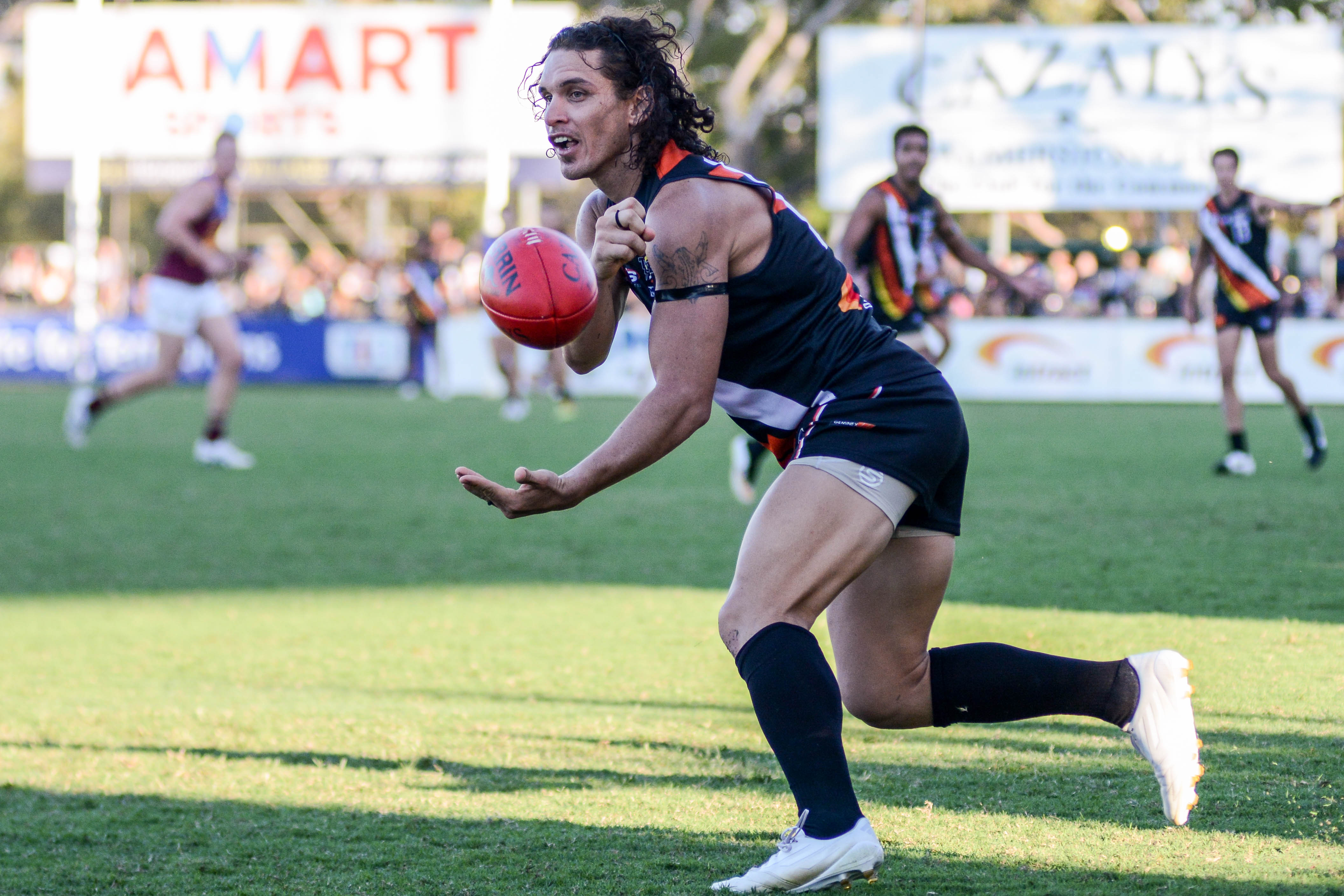
Former captain and six-time club champion, Cameron Ilett, during July 2015.
- 2009 – Cameron Ilett
- 2010 – Cameron Ilett
- 2011 – Jake Dignan
- 2012 – Jason Roe
- 2013 – Cameron Ilett
- 2014 – Cameron Ilett
- 2015 – Richard Tambling
- 2016 – Cameron Ilett
- 2017 – Cameron Ilett

=== Grogan Medallists ===
The Grogan Medal was awarded between 2011 and 2013 to the best and fairest player in the NEAFL Northern Conference.

- Cameron Ilett (2011)

=== Ray Hughson Medallists ===
The Ray Hughson Medal was awarded in the QAFL until 2010, and in the NEAFL Northern Conference between 2011 and 2013 to the leading goalkicker.

- Darren Ewing (2009) – 81 goals
- Darren Ewing (2011) – 115 goals
- Darren Ewing (2013) – 94 goals

=== NEAFL leading goalkicker ===
The NEAFL leading goalkicker has been awarded since 2014 to the player who kicks the most goals in the NEAFL competition.

- Darren Ewing (2015) – 78 goals
- Darren Ewing (2016) – 58 goals
- Darren Ewing (2017) – 61 goals

=== NEAFL (Northern) Rising Stars ===
The NEAFL (Northern) Rising Star was awarded between 2011 and 2013 to the best young player in the Northern Conference.

- Ross Tungatalum (2011)

=== NEAFL Rising Stars ===
The NEAFL (Northern) Rising Star has been awarded since 2014 to the best young player in the NEAFL competition.

- Adam Sambono (2017)

=== Premiership coaches ===
- Murray Davis (2011)
- Xavier Clarke (2015)

=== NEAFL Coach of the Year ===
The NEAFL Coach of the Year has been awarded since 2014 to the best coach in the NEAFL competition.

- Murray Davis (2011)
- Xavier Clarke (2014)

=== QAFL Team of the Year representatives ===
NT Thunder competed in the QAFL between 2009 and 2010 before joining the NEAFL.

- Darren Ewing (2009)
- Cameron Ilett (2009, 2010)
- Jarred Ilett (2009– captain)
- Peter MacFarlane (2009)
- Brett Goodes (2010)
- Zephaniah Skinner (2010)

=== NEAFL Team of the Year representatives ===
Between 2011 and 2013, the Team of the Year representatives were from the Northern Conference. Since 2014, the representatives have been for the whole NEAFL competition.

- Darren Ewing (2011, 2012, 2013, 2014, 2015, 2016, 2017)
- Cameron Ilett (2011– captain, 2013, 2014– captain, 2015– captain, 2016– captain, 2017)
- Shaun Tapp (2011)
- Ross Tungatalum (2011)
- Kenrick Tyrrell (2011)
- Jake Dignan (2012)
- Jason Roe (2012)
- Matt Rosier (2012)
- Chris Dunne (2013, 2014)
- Justin Beugelaar (2015)
- Richard Tambling (2015)
- Raphael Clarke (2016)
- Adam Sambono (2017)

=== AFL players ===
The following is the list of NT Thunder players who have played at AFL level and the club they play(ed) for.

- Jed Anderson – Hawthorn and North Melbourne
- Dom Barry – Melbourne
- Jared Brennan – Brisbane Lions and Gold Coast
- Raphael Clarke – St Kilda
- Nakia Cockatoo – Geelong
- Alwyn Davey – Essendon
- Nathan Djerrkura – Geelong and Western Bulldogs
- Brett Goodes – Western Bulldogs
- Nikki Gore - Adelaide Women
- Steven May – Gold Coast
- Ryan Nyhuis - Fremantle
- Andrew McLeod – Adelaide
- Liam Patrick – Gold Coast
- Relton Roberts – Richmond
- Jason Roe – Brisbane Lions
- Zephaniah Skinner – Western Bulldogs
- Richard Tambling – Richmond and Adelaide
- Troy Taylor – Richmond
- Austin Wonaeamirri – Melbourne
- Joel Jeffrey - Gold Coast

== Club song ==
The NT Thunder club song is "We are the Territory Thunder".

We are Territory boys/girls
We are Territory Thunder

Yellow, ochre, black and white
We are out for plunder

Premierships are on our mind
We’ll tear our foes asunder

We are Territory boys/girls
We are Territory Thunder

We are Territory boys/girls
We are Territory Thunder

Ngiya pumanyinga (I am Thunder)
Kuwa
Ngintha pumanyinga (You are Thunder)
Kuwa
Ngawa pumanyinga, Ngawa pumanyinga, Ngawa pumanyinga (We are Thunder)
Kuwa, Kuwa, Kuwa

== Match records ==
Correct to the end of round 17, 2017

- Highest score for: 193 points
  Round 18, 2010 (Gardens Oval) – NT Thunder 29.19 (193) vs. Broadbeach 8.3 (51)
- Lowest score for: 28 points
  Round 17, 2017 (Sydney Cricket Ground) – NT Thunder 4.4 (28) vs. Sydney 25.24 (174)
- Highest score against: 174 points
  Round 17, 2017 (Sydney Cricket Ground) – NT Thunder 4.4 (28) vs. Sydney 25.24 (174)
- Lowest score against: 15 points
  Round 13, 2014 (TIO Stadium) – NT Thunder 19.11 (125) vs. Sydney University 1.9 (15)
- Highest aggregate score: 287 points
  Round 4, 2009 (Victoria Point) – NT Thunder 20.11 (131) vs. Redland 23.18 (156)
- Lowest aggregate score: 89 points
  Elimination final, 2014 (TIO Stadium) – NT Thunder 7.11 (53) vs. Ainslie 5.6 (36)
- Lowest winning score: 53 points
  Elimination final, 2014 (TIO Stadium) – NT Thunder 7.11 (53) vs. Ainslie 5.6 (36)
- Highest losing score: 131 points
  Round 4, 2009 (TIO Stadium) – NT Thunder 23.18 (131) vs. Redland 23.18 (156)
- Greatest winning margin: 142 points
  Round 18, 2010 (Gardens Oval) – NT Thunder 29.19 (193) vs. Broadbeach 8.3 (51)
- Greatest losing margin: 146 points
  Round 17, 2017 (Sydney Cricket Ground) – NT Thunder 4.4 (28) vs. Sydney 25.24 (174)
- Longest winning streak: 13 matches
  Round 11, 2015 vs. Sydney University (Henson Park) to round 1, 2016 vs. Gold Coast (TIO Stadium)
- Longest losing streak: 3 matches (achieved four times)
  Round 15, 2009 vs. Redland (Traeger Park) to round 17, 2009 vs. Southport (Carrara Stadium)
  Round 2, 2010 vs. Redland (Victoria Point Oval) to round 4, 2010 vs. Southport (Fankhauser Reserve)
  Northern conference grand final, 2012 vs. Brisbane Lions (Leyshon Park) to round 2, 2013 vs. Aspley (Graham Road Oval)
  Round 20, 2013 vs. Redland (Traeger Park) to round 22, 2013 vs. Aspley (TIO Stadium)
- Most goals in a match by an individual: 14 goals
  Darren Ewing, round 19, 2013 (Leyshon Park)
