= Doc Mackenzie =

Australian rules footballer administrator (1946–2022)

- Mackenzie circa March 2012

President of Southport Sharks
- In office November 1973 – 13 May 2022
- Preceded by: Leo Busch
- Succeeded by: Matthew Schneider

Personal details
- Born: Alan Mackenzie; 12 October 1946 Queensland, Australia
- Died: 13 May 2022 (aged 75) Gold Coast, Queensland, Australia
- Spouse: Jo-Ann
- Children: 2 (Mark and Chris)
Australian rules football career
Playing career
Years	Club	Games (Goals)
1964−70	Western Districts	110
Representative team honours
Years	Team	Games (Goals)
- Queensland
Career highlights
- Australian Sports Medal: 2000; AFL Merit Award: 2003; Gold Coast Bulletin Sports Award: 2003; QAFL Hall of Fame (2008); Jack Titus Service Award: 2012; Service to Sport Award: 2018

Alan "Doc" Mackenzie (12 October 1946 – 13 May 2022) was an Australian rules football administrator and general practitioner. He served as the president of the Southport Sharks for 49 years from 1973 until his death in 2022.

Mackenzie was an influential figure in Australian rules football in Queensland, playing a substantial role in the formation of the Gold Coast Suns and serving in several positions at both the Brisbane Bears and the Brisbane Lions. During his tenure as president, Southport played in more than thirty senior grand finals and became one of the most successful football clubs in Queensland. He was an inaugural inductee into the Queensland Australian Football Hall of Fame and was later elevated to "legend" status.

== Football career ==
=== Playing career ===
Mackenzie was born in Queensland and grew up in the western suburbs of Brisbane. He was a foundational junior player at the Sherwood Football Club before moving to the neighbouring Western Districts Football Club to play senior football in the Queensland Australian Football League (QAFL).

At the age of 19, Mackenzie made his debut for Queensland's representative football team. Four years later, he was named the captain of Western Districts, before being forced into retirement the following year because of injury.

=== Administrative career ===
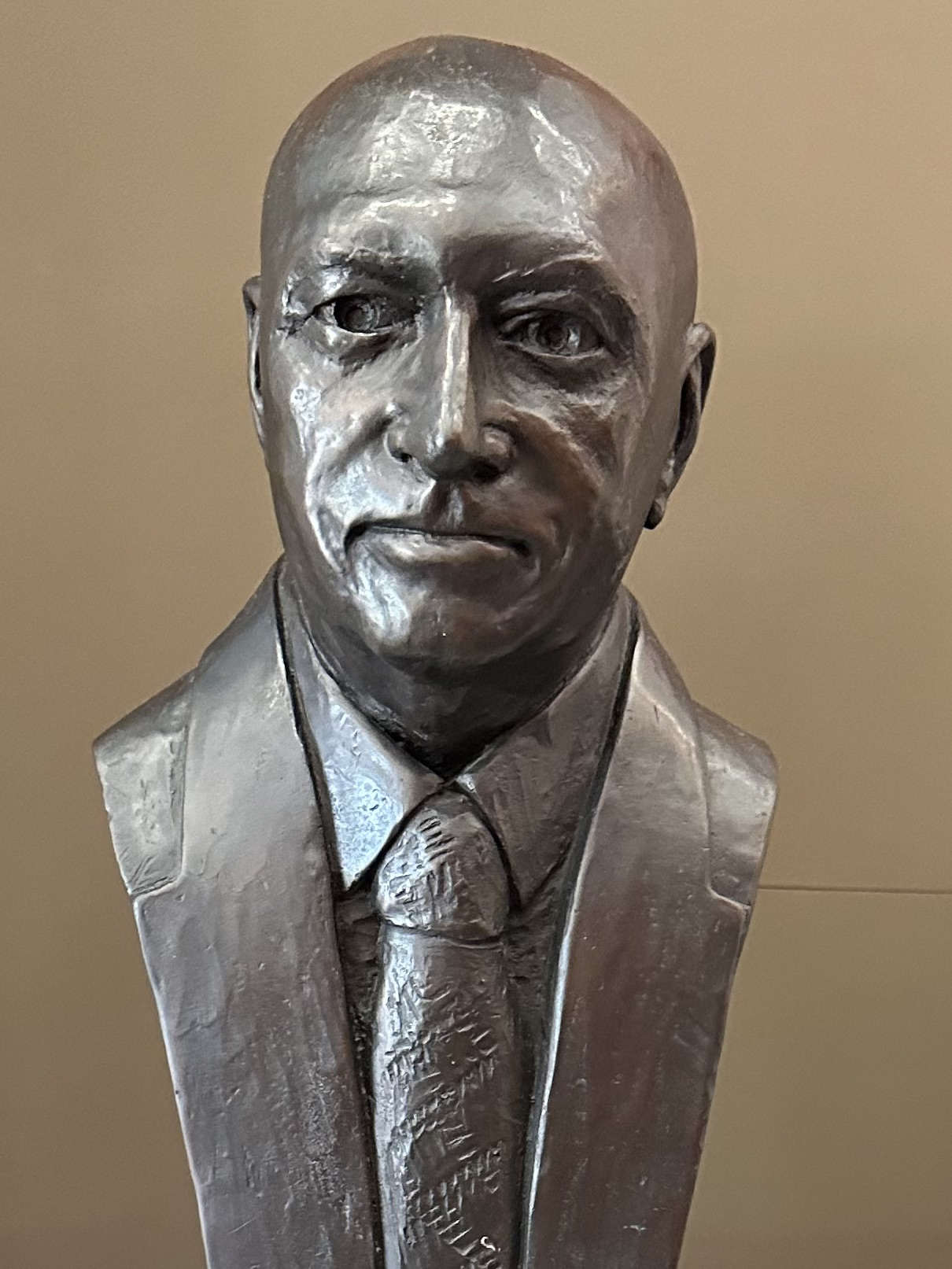
Bust of Mackenzie located at the entrance of the Southport Sharks precinct

Mackenzie was elected president of the Southport Australian Football Club in November 1973 at the age of 27, following the sudden resignation of the club's executive committee. During the first 16 years of his tenure, the club moved from the Gold Coast Australian Football League to the QAFL in 1983 (changing its nickname to the "Sharks" at the same time) and constructed a new home venue – Fankhauser Reserve – that was opened by Mackenzie in April 1989.

Beginning in 1992, Mackenzie served in various roles at the Brisbane Bears in the Australian Football League (AFL), including club doctor, team selector and match committee chairman. He continued serving in these roles at the Brisbane Lions in 1997 and 1998. Mackenzie also served in roles with the Allies representative team and Gold Coast representative teams.

In April 2008, Mackenzie joined the GC 17 bid to support the formation of an AFL team on the Gold Coast. The Gold Coast Football Club (later nicknamed the "Suns") was granted a provisional license by the AFL in March 2009 and entered the league in 2011. Mackenzie served Gold Coast's board for ten years and was inducted as a life member of the club in 2018.

Mackenzie received several awards throughout his life to honour his work in Australian rules football, including the Australian Sports Medal in 2000 and the AFL Merit Award in 2003. He was the inaugural recipient of the Gold Coast Bulletin Sports Award in 2003 and was a life member of AFL Queensland. In 2008, Mackenzie was inducted to the Queensland Australian Football Hall of Fame and was elevated to "legend" status in 2011. He received the Jack Titus Service Award in 2012.

During Mackenzie's tenure as president, Southport played in thirty-one senior men's grand finals and won eighteen premierships, along with two senior women's premierships. His first season as president in 1974 was the last time Southport missed the finals series until 2011. In addition to its successful on-field performances, the club was developed into a multi-million-dollar sports, leisure, and entertainment precinct. Southport moved from the QAFL to the newly-formed North East Australian Football League (NEAFL) in 2011, before later joining the Victorian Football League (VFL) in 2021. Mackenzie was a life member of the Sharks.

== Medical career ==
Mackenzie graduated the University of Queensland with a degree in medicine in 1969. He moved to the Gold Coast in 1972, where he established a general practice in Surfers Paradise.

== Personal life and legacy ==
Mackenzie died on 13 May 2022. AFL CEO Gillon McLachlan described McKenzie as a "central figure driving football in Queensland at the grassroots level when the idea of one team in a national competition, let alone two, was a distant dream", while AFL Queensland chairman Dean Warren said he was a "true legend of the game".

Southport's senior men's best and fairest award is named the "Doc Mackenzie Medal" in his honour. Since September 2022, VFL matches between Southport and Gold Coast have been played for the Doc Mackenzie Cup. The Mackenzie's Sports Bar is located inside the Southport Sharks precinct and is named after Mackenzie.
