= Dean Howard =

Dean Howard may refer to:

- Dean Howard (musician) (born 1961), guitarist
- Dean Howard (footballer) (born 1976), former Australian rules footballer
