= 2011 NEAFL season =

1st season of the North East Australian Football League

- Date: 2 April – 15 September 2011
- Teams: 17
- Champions: NT Thunder; 1st championship
- Runners-up: Ainslie; 1st runners-up result

Eastern Conference
- Premiers: Ainslie; 1st Eastern premiership
- Runners-up: Sydney; 1st Eastern runners-up result
- Minor premiers: Sydney; 1st Eastern minor premiership
- Mulrooney Medallist: Daniel Currie (Sydney – 16 votes); Jarred Moore (Sydney – 16 votes)
- Leading goalkicker: Ben Hughes (Ainslie – 63 goals)

Northern Conference
- Premiers: NT Thunder; 1st Northern premiership
- Runners-up: Morningside; 1st Northern runners-up result
- Minor premiers: NT Thunder; 1st Northern minor premiership
- Grogan Medallist: Cameron Ilett (NT Thunder – 23 votes); Matthew Payne (Aspley – 23 votes)
- Ray Hughson Medallist: Darren Ewing (NT Thunder – 115 goals)

Attendance
- Matches played: 160

The 2011 NEAFL season was the inaugural season of the North East Australian Football League (NEAFL). The season featured 17 clubs and ran from 2 April to 15 September, comprising a 22-round home-and-away season across two conferences, followed by a five-week finals series.

NT Thunder (the Northern Conference premiers) won the inaugural NEAFL championship after defeating Ainslie (the Eastern Conference premiers) by 22 points in the 2011 NEAFL Grand Final.

== League structure ==
The league is split into two divisions called the North division and the East division. The North division comprises nine teams based in South East Queensland (five in Brisbane and four on the Gold Coast) as well as one based in the Northern Territory. The East division contains five teams based in the Australian Capital Territory and two based in Sydney. The top three teams from the 2010 QAFL and the top team from the 2010 AFL Canberra season all qualified for the Foxtel Cup.

== Clubs ==
=== Venues and affiliations ===
Club	State	Home venue(s)	Capacity	AFL affiliation
Eastern Conference
Ainslie	ACT	Ainslie Oval		—N/a
Belconnen	ACT	Manuka Oval	15,351	—N/a
Eastlake	ACT	Manuka Oval	15,351	—N/a
Eastlake	ACT	Ainslie Oval		—N/a
Greater Western Sydney	NSW	Blacktown ISP Oval	10,000	—N/a
Greater Western Sydney	NSW	Robertson Oval	9,000	—N/a
Queanbeyan	ACT	Dairy Farmers Park	8,000	—N/a
Sydney	NSW	Lakeside Oval	1,000	Sydney
Sydney	NSW	Sydney Cricket Ground	46,000	Sydney
Tuggeranong	ACT	Greenway Oval	1,000	—N/a
Northern Conference
Aspley	QLD	Graham Road Oval	3,000	—N/a
Brisbane	QLD	Giffin Park	5,000	Brisbane
Brisbane	QLD	Sherwood Oval		Brisbane
Broadbeach	QLD	H & A Oval	6,500	—N/a
Gold Coast	QLD	H & A Oval	6,500	Gold Coast
Gold Coast	QLD	Fankhauser Reserve	8,000	Gold Coast
Gold Coast	QLD	Metricon Stadium	25,000	Gold Coast
Labrador	QLD	Cooke-Murphy Oval	8,000	—N/a
Morningside	QLD	Jack Esplen Oval		—N/a
Mount Gravatt	QLD	Dittmer Park	2,500	—N/a
NT Thunder	NT	TIO Stadium	12,215	—N/a
Redland	QLD	Tidbold Park		—N/a
Southport	QLD	Fankhauser Reserve	8,000	—N/a

== Home-and-away season ==
=== Round 1 ===
Eastern Conference
Bye; Ainslie, Belconnen, Eastlake, Greater Western Sydney, Queanbeyan, Sydney, Tuggeranong

	Northern Conference
Saturday, 2 April (12:30 pm)	Gold Coast 10.11 (71)	def. by	Mount Gravatt 15.9 (99)	H & A Oval
Saturday, 2 April (2:00 pm)	Labrador 15.8 (98)	def.	Redland 13.15 (93)	Cooke-Murphy Reserve
Saturday, 2 April (7:00 pm)	NT Thunder 16.14 (110)	def.	Aspley 9.9 (63)	TIO Stadium
Sunday, 3 April (2:00 pm)	Morningside 14.12 (96)	def.	Brisbane 14.5 (89)	Jack Esplen Oval
Sunday, 3 April (2:00 pm)	Broadbeach 18.14 (122)	def.	Southport 8.5 (53)	H & A Oval

=== Round 2 ===
	Eastern Conference
Saturday, 9 April (2:00 pm)	Ainslie 9.14 (68)	def. by	Greater Western Sydney 16.13 (109)	Ainslie Oval
Sunday, 10 April (12:30 pm)	Eastlake 4.9 (33)	def. by	Sydney 12.11 (83)	Ainslie Oval
Sunday, 10 April (2:00 pm)	Queanbeyan 26.13 (169)	def.	Belconnen 7.4 (46)	Dairy Farmers Park
	Bye; Tuggeranong

	Northern Conference
Saturday, 9 April (2:00 pm)	Labrador 10.17 (77)	def.	Brisbane 8.10 (58)	Cooke-Murphy Reserve
Saturday, 9 April (2:00 pm)	Mount Gravatt 12.17 (89)	def.	Southport 9.9 (63)	Dittmer Park
Saturday, 9 April (2:00 pm)	Aspley 16.8 (104)	def. by	Broadbeach 18.10 (118)	Graham Road Oval
Saturday, 9 April (7:00 pm)	NT Thunder 11.15 (81)	def.	Gold Coast 11.6 (72)	TIO Stadium
Sunday, 10 April (2:00 pm)	Redland 23.11 (149)	def.	Morningside 14.8 (92)	Tidbold Park

=== Round 3 ===
	Eastern Conference
Saturday, 16 April (11:45 am)	Queanbeyan 9.10 (64)	def. by	Mount Gravatt 19.14 (128)	Dairy Farmers Park
Saturday, 16 April (2:00 pm)	Greater Western Sydney 14.17 (101)	def.	Tuggeranong 10.11 (71)	Blacktown ISP Oval
Saturday, 16 April (3:40 pm)	Sydney 20.18 (138)	def.	Belconnen 4.5 (29)	Sydney Cricket Ground
	Bye; Ainslie

	Northern Conference
Saturday, 16 April (11:15 am)	Gold Coast 16.16 (112)	def.	Aspley 11.13 (79)	H & A Oval
Saturday, 16 April (1:00 pm)	Morningside 17.5 (117)	def.	Eastlake 11.10 (76)	Jack Esplen Oval
Saturday, 16 April (2:00 pm)	Southport 10.12 (72)	def.	Labrador 7.10 (52)	Fankhauser Reserve
Saturday, 16 April (2:15 pm)	Broadbeach 10.7 (67)	def. by	NT Thunder 20.11 (131)	H & A Oval
	Bye; Brisbane, Redland

=== Round 4 ===
Eastern Conference
Bye; Ainslie, Belconnen, Eastlake, Greater Western Sydney, Queanbeyan, Sydney, Tuggeranong

	Northern Conference
Saturday, 23 April (2:00 pm)	Labrador 9.4 (58)	def. by	Gold Coast 13.12 (90)	Cooke-Murphy Reserve
Saturday, 23 April (2:00 pm)	Brisbane 22.15 (147)	def.	Southport 10.9 (69)	Giffin Park
Saturday, 23 April (7:00 pm)	NT Thunder 21.10 (136)	def.	Redland 15.12 (102)	Traeger Park
Sunday, 24 April (2:00 pm)	Broadbeach 20.16 (136)	def.	Morningside 8.11 (59)	H & A Oval
	Bye; Aspley, Mount Gravatt

=== Round 5 ===
	Eastern Conference
Friday, 29 April (2:00 pm)	Sydney 18.15 (123)	def.	Tuggeranong 1.6 (12)	Lakeside Oval
Saturday, 30 April (2:00 pm)	Ainslie 20.16 (136)	def.	Queanbeyan 10.5 (65)	Ainslie Oval
Sunday, 1 May (2:00 pm)	Belconnen 8.6 (54)	def. by	Eastlake 21.7 (133)	Manuka Oval
	Bye; Greater Western Sydney
The match between Sydney and Tuggeranong was moved from a 4:10pm start at the Sydney Cricket Ground (as a curtain-raiser to the round 6 AFL match between Sydney and Carlton) to Lakeside Oval at 2pm because of rain affecting the ground's surface.

	Northern Conference
Saturday, 30 April (2:00 pm)	Mount Gravatt 11.9 (75)	def. by	Gold Coast 12.16 (88)	Dittmer Park
Saturday, 30 April (7:00 pm)	NT Thunder 27.20 (182)	def.	Morningside 9.9 (63)	TIO Stadium
Sunday, 1 May (2:00 pm)	Redland 13.8 (86)	def. by	Brisbane 18.14 (122)	Tidbold Park
	Bye; Broadbeach, Southport

=== Round 6 ===
	Eastern Conference
Saturday, 7 May (9:10 am)	Sydney 12.15 (87)	def.	Greater Western Sydney 3.9 (27)	Manuka Oval
Sunday, 8 May (2:00 pm)	Queanbeyan 16.13 (109)	def.	Belconnen 14.7 (91)	Dairy Farmers Park
Sunday, 8 May (2:00 pm)	Tuggeranong 13.8 (86)	def. by	Ainslie 15.13 (103)	Greenway Oval
	Bye; Eastlake

	Northern Conference
Saturday, 7 May (11:00 am)	Gold Coast 17.18 (120)	def.	Brisbane 9.9 (63)	Fankhauser Reserve
Saturday, 7 May (2:00 pm)	Mount Gravatt 17.19 (120)	def.	Labrador 16.6 (102)	Dittmer Park
Saturday, 7 May (2:00 pm)	Southport 11.7 (73)	def. by	NT Thunder 14.20 (104)	Fankhauser Reserve
Saturday, 7 May (2:00 pm)	Redland 24.16 (160)	def.	Broadbeach 8.8 (56)	Tidbold Park
Sunday, 8 May (2:00 pm)	Morningside 12.8 (80)	def. by	Aspley 15.128 (102)	Jack Esplen Oval

=== Round 7 ===
	Eastern Conference
Saturday, 14 May (1:50 pm)	Sydney 18.12 (120)	def.	Gold Coast 3.10 (28)	Lakeside Oval
Saturday, 14 May (2:00 pm)	Eastlake 8.9 (57)	def. by	Ainslie 14.10 (94)	Manuka Oval
Sunday, 15 May (2:00 pm)	Belconnen 14.12 (96)	def. by	Tuggeranong 14.13 (97)	Manuka Oval
	Bye; Queanbeyan

	Northern Conference
Saturday, 14 May (2:00 pm)	Brisbane 14.17 (101)	def.	Greater Western Sydney 12.14 (86)	Giffin Park
Saturday, 14 May (2:00 pm)	Labrador 14.8 (92)	def.	Broadbeach 11.10 (76)	Cooke-Murphy Reserve
Saturday, 14 May (2:00 pm)	Aspley 18.7 (115)	def.	Redland 14.6 (90)	Graham Rd
Saturday, 14 May (2:00 pm)	NT Thunder 20.6 (126)	def.	Mount Gravatt 13.16 (94)	Traeger Park
Sunday, 15 May (2:00 pm)	Morningside 17.6 (108)	def.	Southport 12.10 (82)	Jack Esplen Oval

=== Round 8 ===
	Eastern Conference
Saturday, 21 May (2:00 pm)	Greater Western Sydney 19.15 (129)	def.	Queanbeyan 13.10 (88)	Blacktown ISP Oval
Saturday, 21 May (6:00 pm)	Tuggeranong 13.13 (91)	def.	Eastlake 13.9 (87)	Greenway Oval
Sunday, 22 May (2:00 pm)	Belconnen 7.10 (91)	def. by	Ainslie 10.18 (78)	Manuka Oval
	Bye; Sydney

	Northern Conference
Saturday, 21 May (2:00 pm)	Southport 6.11 (47)	def. by	Redland 17.18 (120)	Fankhauser Reserve
Saturday, 21 May (2:00 pm)	Aspley 8.15 (63)	def. by	Morningside 10.7 (67)	Graham Road Oval
Saturday, 21 May (2:00 pm)	Broadbeach 12.18 (90)	def. by	Mount Gravatt 18.7 (115)	H & A Oval
Saturday, 21 May (2:00 pm)	Brisbane 12.12 (84)	def. by	NT Thunder 14.10 (94)	Sherwood Oval
	Bye; Gold Coast, Labrador

=== Round 9 ===
	Eastern Conference
Saturday, 28 May (12:30 pm)	Ainslie 11.8 (74)	def. by	Sydney 18.16 (124)	North Dalton Park
Saturday, 28 May (2:00 pm)	Eastlake 7.8 (50)	def. by	Greater Western Sydney 16.16 (112)	Manuka Oval
Sunday, 29 May (2:00 pm)	Tuggeranong 14.9 (93)	def. by	Queanbeyan 20.3 (123)	Greenway Oval
	Bye; Belconnen

	Northern Conference
Saturday, 28 May (1:15 pm)	Gold Coast 18.5 (113)	def.	Southport 11.11 (77)	Sir Bruce Small Park
Saturday, 28 May (2:00 pm)	Mount Gravatt 9.13 (67)	def. by	Redland 10.12 (72)	Dittmer Park
Sunday, 29 May (1:15 pm)	Brisbane 11.10 (76)	def. by	Labrador 13.17 (95)	Giffin Park
Sunday, 29 May (2:00 pm)	Broadbeach 13.10 (88)	def.	Aspley 10.8 (68)	H & A Oval
	Bye; Morningside, NT Thunder

=== Round 10 ===
	Eastern Conference
Saturday, 4 June (12:15 pm)	Greater Western Sydney 17.9 (111)	def.	Gold Coast 11.8 (74)	Blacktown ISP Oval
Saturday, 4 June (2:00 pm)	Tuggeranong 22.12 (144)	def.	Eastlake 9.13 (67)	Greenway Oval
Sunday, 5 June (2:00 pm)	Belconnen 13.9 (87)	def.	Queanbeyan 10.13 (73)	Manuka Oval
	Bye; Ainslie

	Northern Conference
Saturday, 4 June (1:00 pm)	Brisbane 14.13 (97)	def. by	Sydney 16.8 (104)	Giffin Park
Saturday, 4 June (2:00 pm)	Aspley 13.13 (91)	def.	Mount Gravatt 12.17 (89)	Graham Road Oval
Saturday, 4 June (7:00 pm)	Redland 10.10 (70)	def. by	NT Thunder 24.9 (153)	TIO Stadium
Sunday, 5 June (2:00 pm)	Morningside 24.11 (155)	def.	Labrador 8.12 (60)	Jack Esplen Oval
Sunday, 5 June (2:00 pm)	Southport 15.10 (100)	def.	Broadbeach 8.11 (59)	Fankhauser Reserve

=== Round 11 ===
	Eastern Conference
Saturday, 11 June (2:00 pm)	Ainslie 21.21 (147)	def.	Tuggeranong 9.8 (62)	Ainslie Oval
Saturday, 11 June (2:00 pm)	Belconnen 9.11 (65)	def. by	Eastlake 18.13 (121)	Manuka Oval
Sunday, 12 June (10:40 am)	Sydney 15.12 (102)	def.	Queanbeyan 7.11 (53)	Sydney Cricket Ground
	Bye; Greater Western Sydney

	Northern Conference
Saturday, 11 June (1:00 pm)	Gold Coast 12.10 (82)	def.	Morningside 12.8 (80)	H & A Oval
Saturday, 11 June (2:00 pm)	Southport 14.9 (93)	def. by	Mount Gravatt 15.12 (102)	Fankhauser Reserve
Saturday, 11 June (2:00 pm)	Aspley 13.18 (96)	def.	Redland 10.9 (69)	Graham Road Oval
Saturday, 11 June (7:00 pm)	NT Thunder 19.15 (129)	def.	Brisbane 12.10 (82)	TIO Stadium
Sunday, 12 June (2:00 pm)	Broadbeach 9.9 (63)	def.	Labrador 4.9 (33)	H & A Oval

=== Round 12 ===
	Eastern Conference
Saturday, 18 June (2:00 pm)	Ainslie 15.14 (104)	def.	Belconnen 10.5 (65)	Ainslie Oval
Saturday, 18 June (2:00 pm)	Greater Western Sydney 3.11 (29)	def. by	Sydney 17.13 (115)	Blacktown ISP Oval
Sunday, 19 June (2:00 pm)	Queanbeyan 11.18 (84)	def. by	Tuggeranong 17.14 (116)	Dairy Farmers Park
	Bye; Eastlake

Northern Conference
Bye; Aspley, Brisbane, Broadbeach, Gold Coast, Labrador, Morningside, Mount Gravatt, NT Thunder, Redland, Southport

=== Round 13 ===
	Eastern Conference
Saturday, 25 June (11:45 am)	Ainslie 10.7 (67)	def. by	Southport 19.17 (131)	Ainslie Oval
Saturday, 25 June (11:45 am)	Eastlake 15.7 (97)	def.	Broadbeach 14.9 (93)	Manuka Oval
Saturday, 25 June (12:30 pm)	Sydney 33.22 (220)	def.	Queanbeyan 5.2 (32)	Sydney Cricket Ground
Saturday, 25 June (2:00 pm)	Greater Western Sydney 26.20 (176)	def.	Belconnen 7.4 (46)	Blacktown ISP Oval
	Bye; Tuggeranong

	Northern Conference
Saturday, 25 June (3:20 pm)	Aspley 15.9 (99)	def.	NT Thunder 8.11 (59)	Traeger Park
Sunday, 26 June (2:00 pm)	Labrador 7.11 (53)	def. by	Morningside 11.12 (78)	Cooke-Murphy Reserve
Sunday, 26 June (2:00 pm)	Mount Gravatt 15.13 (103)	def.	Brisbane 14.14 (98)	Dittmer Park
Sunday, 26 June (3:15 pm)	Redland 11.15 (81)	def. by	Gold Coast 19.13 (127)	Yeronga

=== Round 14 ===
	Eastern Conference
Saturday, 2 July (2:00 pm)	Tuggeranong 8.9 (57)	def. by	Sydney 33.14 (212)	Greenway Oval
Saturday, 2 July (2:00 pm)	Eastlake 16.18 (114)	def.	Belconnen 9.9 (63)	Manuka Oval
	Bye; Queanbeyan

	Northern Conference
Saturday, 2 July (1:00 pm)	Labrador 13.11 (89)	def. by	Ainslie 17.13 (115)	Cooke-Murphy Reserve
Saturday, 2 July (1:00 pm)	Broadbeach 12.15 (87)	def. by	Redland 14.15 (99)	H & A Oval
Saturday, 2 July (2:00 pm)	Southport 9.6 (60)	def. by	Gold Coast 24.11 (155)	Fankhauser Reserve
Saturday, 2 July (2:00 pm)	Aspley 21.11 (137)	def.	Brisbane 13.11 (89)	Graham Road Oval
Saturday, 2 July (7:00 pm)	NT Thunder 16.10 (106)	def.	Greater Western Sydney 8.9 (57)	TIO Stadium
Sunday, 3 July (2:00 pm)	Morningside 14.17 (101)	def. by	Mount Gravatt 16.14 (110)	Jack Esplen Oval

=== Round 15 ===
	Eastern Conference
Saturday, 9 July (12:30 pm)	Greater Western Sydney 16.15 (111)	def.	Brisbane 11.8 (74)	Blacktown ISP Oval
Saturday, 9 July (2:00 pm)	Ainslie 13.16 (94)	def.	Tuggeranong 13.10 (88)	Ainslie Oval
Saturday, 9 July (2:00 pm)	Eastlake 15.16 (106)	def.	Queanbeyan 8.6 (54)	Manuka Oval
	Bye; Belconnen

	Northern Conference
Saturday, 9 July (2:00 pm)	Labrador 10.15 (75)	def. by	Mount Gravatt 15.14 (104)	Cooke-Murphy Reserve
Saturday, 9 July (2:00 pm)	Morningside 14.11 (94)	def.	NT Thunder 10.9 (69)	Jack Esplen Oval
Saturday, 9 July (2:00 pm)	Redland 17.11 (113)	def.	Aspley 11.8 (74)	Tidbold Park
Saturday, 9 July (3:00 pm)	Gold Coast 21.15 (141)	def.	Sydney 9.8 (62)	Carrara Stadium
Sunday, 10 July (2:00 pm)	Southport 13.14 (92)	def.	Broadbeach 12.11 (83)	Fankhauser Reserve

=== Round 16 ===
	Eastern Conference
Saturday, 16 July (2:00 pm)	Belconnen 14.16 (100)	def. by	Tuggeranong 16.10 (106)	Manuka Oval
Sunday, 17 July (9:40 am)	Sydney 15.11 (101)	def.	Eastlake 12.9 (81)	Sydney Cricket Ground
Sunday, 17 July (2:00 pm)	Queanbeyan 9.8 (62)	def. by	Ainslie 13.17 (95)	Dairy Farmers Park
	Bye; Greater Western Sydney

	Northern Conference
Saturday, 16 July (10:15 am)	Gold Coast 10.10 (70)	def. by	NT Thunder 20.9 (129)	Cazaly's Stadium
Saturday, 16 July (2:00 pm)	Mount Gravatt 17.10 (112)	def.	Aspley 16.8 (104)	Dittmer Park
Saturday, 16 July (2:00 pm)	Southport 17.15 (117)	def.	Morningside 9.10 (64)	Fankhauser Reserve
Saturday, 16 July (2:00 pm)	Brisbane 16.9 (105)	def. by	Broadbeach 17.8 (110)	Sherwood Oval
Saturday, 16 July (2:00 pm)	Redland 19.14 (128)	def.	Labrador 11.16 (82)	Tidbold Park

=== Round 17 ===
	Eastern Conference
Saturday, 23 July (10:00 am)	Sydney 9.3 (57)	def. by	Greater Western Sydney 18.13 (121)	Blacktown ISP Oval
Saturday, 23 July (11:45 am)	Tuggeranong 7.9 (51)	def. by	Redland 15.17 (107)	Greenway Oval
Saturday, 23 July (2:00 pm)	Eastlake 11.6 (72)	def. by	Ainslie 21.7 (133)	Manuka Oval
	Bye; Queanbeyan

	Northern Conference
Saturday, 23 July (1:00 pm)	Aspley 17.18 (120)	def.	Belconnen 12.9 (81)	Graham Road Oval
Saturday, 23 July (3:25 pm)	Gold Coast 18.10 (118)	def.	Brisbane 7.13 (55)	Carrara Stadium
Saturday, 23 July (3:25 pm)	NT Thunder 11.14 (80)	def. by	Broadbeach 12.9 (81)	Traeger Park
	Bye; Labrador, Morningside, Mount Gravatt, Southport

=== Round 18 ===
	Eastern Conference
Saturday, 30 July (2:00 pm)	Tuggeranong 17.5 (107)	def. by	Greater Western Sydney 19.19 (133)	Greenway Oval
Saturday, 30 July (2:00 pm)	Belconnen 7.5 (47)	def. by	Ainslie 17.10 (112)	Manuka Oval
Sunday, 31 July (2:00 pm)	Queanbeyan 11.12 (78)	def. by	Eastlake 17.13 (115)	Dairy Farmers Park
	Bye; Sydney

	Northern Conference
Saturday, 30 July (2:00 pm)	Labrador 18.8 (116)	def. by	Southport 18.10 (118)	Cooke-Murphy Reserve
Saturday, 30 July (2:00 pm)	Mount Gravatt 17.9 (111)	def.	Morningside 14.13 (97)	Dittmer Park
	Bye; Aspley, Brisbane, Broadbeach, Gold Coast, NT Thunder, Redland

=== Round 19 ===
	Eastern Conference
Saturday, 6 August (1:00 pm)	Greater Western Sydney 18.19 (127)	def.	NT Thunder 18.7 (115)	Blacktown ISP Oval
Saturday, 6 August (2:00 pm)	Belconnen 1.11 (17)	def. by	Sydney 17.15 (117)	Manuka Oval
Sunday, 7 August (2:00 pm)	Tuggeranong 10.12 (72)	def. by	Eastlake 29.18 (192)	Greenway Oval
	Bye; Ainslie

	Northern Conference
Saturday, 6 August (1:00 pm)	Southport 15.18 (108)	def.	Queanbeyan 5.11 (41)	Fankhauser Reserve
Saturday, 6 August (2:00 pm)	Labrador 14.14 (98)	def.	Aspley 12.11 (83)	Cooke-Murphy Reserve
Saturday, 6 August (2:00 pm)	Broadbeach 14.12 (96)	def.	Gold Coast 12.8 (80)	H & A Oval
Saturday, 6 August (2:00 pm)	Brisbane 13.10 (88)	v	Morningside 12.16 (88)	Sherwood Oval
Saturday, 6 August (2:00 pm)	Redland 9.24 (78)	def. by	Mount Gravatt 12.16 (88)	Tidbold Park

=== Round 20 ===
	Eastern Conference
Saturday, 13 August (12:00 pm)	Greater Western Sydney 20.13 (133)	def.	Belconnen 9.13 (67)	Robertson Oval
Saturday, 13 August (2:00 pm)	Eastlake 11.6 (72)	def. by	Ainslie 19.11 (125)	Manuka Oval
Sunday, 14 August (2:00 pm)	Queanbeyan 14.13 (37)	def. by	Sydney 21.24 (150)	Dairy Farmers Park
	Bye; Tuggeranong

	Northern Conference
Saturday, 13 August (2:00 pm)	Brisbane 11.17 (83)	def.	Gold Coast 12.7 (79)	Giffin Park
Saturday, 13 August (2:00 pm)	Aspley 10.11 (71)	def. by	Southport 13.16 (94)	Graham Road Oval
Saturday, 13 August (7:00 pm)	Mount Gravatt 12.5 (77)	def. by	NT Thunder 16.15 (111)	TIO Stadium
Sunday, 14 August (2:00 pm)	Morningside 8.12 (120)	def.	Redland 10.12 (72)	Jack Esplen Oval
Sunday, 14 August (2:00 pm)	Broadbeach 13.14 (92)	def.	Labrador 11.6 (72)	H & A Oval

=== Round 21 ===
	Eastern Conference
Saturday, 20 August (1:00 pm)	Sydney 26.23 (179)	def.	Brisbane 4.5 (29)	Blacktown ISP Oval
Sunday, 21 August (2:00 pm)	Queanbeyan 12.12 (84)	def. by	Ainslie 16.13 (109)	Dairy Farmers Park
Sunday, 21 August (2:00 pm)	Tuggeranong 12.11 (83)	def. by	Belconnen 21.10 (136)	Greenway Oval
	Bye; Eastlake

	Northern Conference
Saturday, 20 August (10:10 am)	Gold Coast 22.17 (149)	def.	Greater Western Sydney 7.10 (52)	Carrara Stadium
Saturday, 20 August (7:00 pm)	NT Thunder 23.15 (153)	def.	Labrador 9.6 (60)	TIO Stadium
Sunday, 21 August (2:00 pm)	Mount Gravatt 12.8 (80)	def. by	Aspley 18.13 (121)	Dittmer Park
Sunday, 21 August (2:00 pm)	Morningside 12.9 (81)	def.	Broadbeach 12.6 (78)	Jack Esplen Oval
Sunday, 21 August (2:00 pm)	Redland 6.15 (51)	def. by	Southport 13.11 (89)	Tidbold Park

=== Round 22 ===
	Eastern Conference
Saturday, 27 August (2:00 pm)	Ainslie 14.2 (86)	def. by	Sydney 16.14 (110)	Ainslie Oval
Saturday, 27 August (2:00 pm)	Greater Western Sydney 16.14 (110)	def.	Eastlake 14.6 (90)	Blacktown ISP Oval
Saturday, 27 August (2:00 pm)	Queanbeyan 30.16 (196)	def.	Tuggeranong 15.9 (99)	Dairy Farmers Park
	Bye; Belconnen

Northern Conference
Bye; Aspley, Brisbane, Broadbeach, Gold Coast, Labrador, Morningside, Mount Gravatt, NT Thunder, Redland, Southport

== Ladder ==
=== Eastern Conference ===
Pos	Team	Pld	W	L	D	PF	PA	PP	Pts
1	Sydney	18	16	2	0	2204	983	224.2	64
2	Ainslie (C)	17	13	4	0	1740	1375	126.5	52
3	Greater Western Sydney	17	12	5	0	1724	1465	117.7	48
4	Eastlake	17	7	10	0	1563	1589	98.4	28
5	Tuggeranong	17	5	12	0	1435	2101	68.3	20
6	Queanbeyan	17	4	13	0	1412	1930	73.2	16
7	Belconnen	17	2	15	0	1142	1983	57.6	8

Source: www.neafl.com.au
Rules for classification: 1) points; 2) percentage; 3) number of points for.
(C) NEAFL champions

=== Northern Conference ===
Pos	Team	Pld	W	L	D	PF	PA	PP	Pts
1	NT Thunder (P) (C)	18	14	4	0	2068	1436	144.0	56
2	Mount Gravatt	18	12	6	0	1804	1645	109.7	48
3	Gold Coast	18	11	7	0	1752	1461	119.9	44
4	Morningside	18	9	8	1	1641	1719	95.5	38
5	Aspley	18	9	9	0	1699	1625	104.6	36
6	Broadbeach	18	9	9	0	1595	1621	98.4	36
7	Southport	18	9	9	0	1538	1664	92.4	36
8	Redland	18	8	10	0	1740	1741	99.9	32
9	Labrador	18	5	13	0	1389	1783	77.9	20
10	Brisbane	18	4	13	1	1540	1864	82.6	18

Source: www.neafl.com.au
Rules for classification: 1) points; 2) percentage; 3) number of points for.

== Finals series ==
Eastern Conference

Semi-finals
1	Sydney	21.7 (133)
2	Ainslie	9.17 (71)
3	Greater Western Sydney	9.14 (68)
4	Eastlake	20.16 (136)

Preliminary Final
2	Ainslie	21.20 (146)
4	Eastlake	8.8 (56)

Grand Final
1	Sydney	10.13 (73)
2	Ainslie	19.11 (124)

Northern Conference

Qualifying and elimination finals
2	Mount Gravatt	26.12 (168)
3	Gold Coast	16.6 (102)
4	Morningside	20.20 (140)
5	Aspley	15.11 (101)

Semi-finals
1	NT Thunder	17.5 (107)
2	Mount Gravatt	11.8 (74)
3	Gold Coast	7.10 (52)
4	Morningside	19.13 (127)

Preliminary final
2	Mount Gravatt	9.11 (65)
4	Morningside	17.16 (118)

Grand final
1	NT Thunder	26.22 (178)
4	Morningside	12.8 (80)

=== Week 1 ===
	Northern Conference Qualifying Final
Sunday, 28 August (2:00 pm)	Mount Gravatt 26.12 (168)	def.	Gold Coast 16.6 (102)	Tidbold Park

	Northern Conference Elimination Final
Sunday, 28 August (2:00 pm)	Morningside 20.20 (140)	def.	Aspley 15.11 (101)	Jack Esplen Oval

=== Week 2 ===
	Eastern Conference Semi-finals
Saturday, 3 September (2:00 pm)	Sydney 21.7 (133)	def.	Ainslie 9.17 (71)	Manuka Oval
Sunday, 4 September (2:00 pm)	Greater Western Sydney 9.14 (68)	def. by	Eastlake 20.16 (136)	Manuka Oval

	Northern Conference Semi-finals
Saturday, 3 September (9:10 am)	Gold Coast 7.10 (52)	def. by	Morningside 19.13 (127)	Fankhauser Reserve
Saturday, 3 September (7:00 pm)	NT Thunder 17.5 (107)	def.	Mount Gravatt 11.8 (74)	TIO Stadium

=== Week 3 ===
	Eastern Conference Preliminary Final
Saturday, 10 September (2:00 pm)	Ainslie 21.20 (146)	def.	Eastlake 8.8 (56)	Manuka Oval

	Northern Conference Preliminary Final
Sunday, 11 September (2:00 pm)	Mount Gravatt 9.11 (65)	def. by	Morningside 17.16 (118)	Tidbold Park

=== Week 4 ===
	Eastern Conference Grand Final
Saturday, 17 September (2:15 pm)	Sydney 10.13 (73)	def. by	Ainslie 19.11 (125)	Manuka Oval (crowd: 4,230)

	Northern Conference Grand Final
Sunday, 18 September (2:15 pm)	NT Thunder 26.22 (178)	def.	Morningside 12.8 (80)	Tidbold Park

=== Week 5 ===
	NEAFL Grand Final
Saturday, 24 September (2:00 pm)	NT Thunder 16.18 (114)	def.	Ainslie 13.14 (92)	Traeger Park

== Foxtel Cup ==
=== Round of 16 ===
Game #1 (AFL Rd 1) 26 March 2011; 15:05 EST	Morningside	61–76 curtain raiser to Adelaide v Hawthorn	Northern Territory Thunder	AAMI Stadium, Adelaide match report
	2.0 (12); 4.1 (25); 6.4 (40); 9.7 (61)	match report	3.2 (20); 7.3 (45); 8.4 (52); 12.4 (76)
		Goals
	Shaun Mugavin 4, Austin Lucy 2, Joshua Brown 1, Aaron Rogers 1, Jake Thomlinson 1		Ross Tungatulum 4, Andrew McLeod 3, Jed Anderson 1, Cameron Ilett 1, Nyaburu Kelly 1, Matthew Rosier 1, Josh Watson 1
		Bests
	Nathan Kinch, Shaun Mugavin, Austin Lucy, Damien Bonnie, Jake Thomlinson		Andrew McLeod, Ross Tungatalum, Shaun Tapp, Jed Anderson, Matthew Rosier

Game #4 (AFL Rd 4) 16 April 2011; 16:05 CST	West Adelaide	100–23 curtain raiser to Port Adelaide v Adelaide	Ainslie	AAMI Stadium, Adelaide match report
	3.2 (20); 8.5 (53); 11.6 (72); 15.10 (100)	match report	0.2 (2); 1.2 (8); 3.4 (22); 3.5 (23)
		Goals
	Fielke 5, N.Caruso 2, Webb 2, Agars, Borholm, Davenport, Eagle, Moran, Rankine		Bowles, Crook, Hughes
		Bests
	Davenport, Fielke, N.Caruso, Birss, Moran, Fisher		I.Lawless, Hughes, Crook, M.Lawless

Game #6 (AFL Rd 6) 30 April 2011; 16:05 EST	Northern Bullants	123–34 curtain raiser to Richmond v Brisbane Lions	Greater Western Sydney	Melbourne Cricket Ground match report
	8.1 (49); 12.4 (76); 14.7 (91); 19.9 (123)	match report	0.0 (0); 0.3 (3); 4.4 (28); 5.4 (34)
		Goals
	Thornton 6, Arrowsmith 4, Saad 3, Henderson 2, Kerr, Meese, O’Keeffe, Watson		Giles 2, Tunbridge 2, Casley
		Bests
	Thornton, McLean, Cachia, Gianfagna, McCorkell, Watson		Miles, Shiel, Giles, Hampton, Clifton

Game #8 (AFL Rd 9) 21 May 2011; 17:05 CST	North Adelaide	107–22 match played POST; Port Adelaide v Fremantle	Labrador	AAMI Stadium, Adelaide match report
	4.2; 7.5; 11.7; 16.11 (107)	match report	1.3; 2.3; 3.4; 3.4 (22)
		Goals
	Alleway 6, Gill 3, Thring 2, Armstrong, Backwell, Bennett, Connors, Teasdale		Clarke, Grayson, White
		Bests
	Backwell, Gill, Alleway, Bennett, Thiele, Ryswyk, Thompson		Jones, Featherstone, Grayson, Clarke

=== Quarter-finals ===
QF #1 (AFL Rd 10) 28 May 2011; 5:15 pm CST	Northern Territory Thunder	71–77 curtain raiser to Richmond v Port Adelaide	East Perth	TIO Stadium, Darwin match report
	2.2 (14); 3.5 (23); 6.6 (42); 10.11 (71)	match report	3.2 (20); 6.3 (39); 11.4 (70); 12.5 (77)
		Goals
	Tungatalum 3, Cox 2, C. Ilett 2, McLeod 2, Ewing		Pettifer 4, Smith 3, Delborello 2, Swan 2, Seal
		Bests
	McLeod, Maher, Rosier, Tungatalum, J. Ilett		Travers, Lee, Pettifer, Clarke, Smith, Moss

== Awards ==
- The Grogan Medal was shared between Matthew Payne of Southport and Cameron Ilett of NT Thunder. Both polled 23 votes to be judged as the best and fairest players in the Northern Conference of the NEAFL.
- The Mulrooney Medal was shared between Daniel Currie and Jarred Moore, both of the Sydney. Both players polled 16 votes to be judged as the best and fairest players in the Eastern Conference of the NEAFL.
- The NAB NEAFL Rising Star Award was awarded to Ross Tungatalum of the NT Thunder. The NAB NEAFL Rising Star Award is given to the player voted as the best rising star in the Northern Conference of the NEAFL.
- The Gary Robb Rising Star Award was awarded to Hayden Armstrong of the Eastlake. The Gary Robb Rising Star Award is given to the player voted as the best rising star in the Eastern Conference of the NEAFL.
- The Ray Hughson Medal was awarded to Darren Ewing of the NT Thunder, who kicked 115 goals during the season.
- Seven of the Queensland-based clubs entered their reserves teams in the QAFL reserves competition for the 2011 season. Redland won the premiership, defeating Southport 14.11 (95) to 8.10 (58) in the grand final.

=== Best and fairest ===
Club	Award name	Player
Ainslie	Hibberson Cup Perpetual Trophy	Robert Shirley
Aspley	Carl Herbert Medal	Robert Copeland
Belconnen		Lexie Bennett
Brisbane		
Broadbeach	Syd Guildford Trophy	Dayne Zorko
Eastlake		Aaron Bruce
Gold Coast		Jacob Gillbee
Greater Western Sydney		
Labrador	Danny Newman Medal	Steve Wrigley
Morningside	Devery-Kelly Medal	Nathan Kinch
Mount Gravatt	Jim Fletcher Medal	Gavin Grose
NT Thunder		Jake Dignan
Queanbeyan	Tony Wynd Medal	Ryan Quade
Redland	Dowling Medal	Tom Salter
Southport		Matthew Payne
Sydney		
Tuggeranong		Ben Cleaver

== Team of the year ==
=== Eastern Conference ===
2011 Eastern Conference Team of the Year
B:	Rob Tuohey (Ainslie)	Jack Hombsch (Greater Western Sydney)	Mitch Frail (Eastlake)
HB:	David Smith (Tuggeranong)	Simon Curtis (Belconnen)	Dale Walker (Ainslie)
C:	Marcus Crook (Ainslie)	Robert Shirley (Ainslie)	Aaron Wiles (Eastlake)
HF:	Aaron Bruce (Eastlake)	Ben Hughes (Ainslie)	Nathan Gordon (Sydney)
F:	James Kavanagh (Queanbeyan)	Trent Dennis-Lane (Sydney)	Nick Paine (Ainslie)
Foll:	Jonathan Giles (Greater Western Sydney)	Dylan Shiel (Greater Western Sydney)	Ben Cleaver (Tuggeranong)
Int:	Chad Gibson (Eastlake)	Jeremy Cameron (Greater Western Sydney)	Todd Dickinson (Queanbeyan)
Int:	Kane Murphy (Sydney)		
Coach:	N/A		

=== Northern Conference ===
2011 Northern Conference Team of the Year
B:	Nathan Kinch (Morningside)	Gavin Grose (Mount Gravatt)	Caleb Brown (Morningside)
HB:	Robert Copeland (Aspley)	Shaun Tapp (NT Thunder)	Kallen Geary (Broadbeach)
C:	Kallen Geary (Broadbeach)	Cameron Ilett (NT Thunder) (C)	Ryan Davey (Labrador)
HF:	Albert Proud (Mount Gravatt)	Kent Abey (Morningside)	Micah Buchanan (Aspley)
F:	Ross Tungatalum (NT Thunder)	Darren Ewing (NT Thunder)	Chris Smith (Mount Gravatt)
Foll:	Kenrick Tyrrell (NT Thunder)	Matthew Payne (Southport)	Dayne Zorko (Broadbeach)
Int:	Paul Shelton (Morningside)	Matt Jones (Labrador)	Amon Buchanan (Brisbane)
Int:	Jacob Gilbee (Gold Coast)	Scott Clouston (Redland)	
Coach:	N/A		

== AFL draftees ==
Draft pick	Player	Club	Drafted to
88_{N}	Alex Sexton	Redland	Gold Coast
91_{N}	Jackson Allen	Morningside	Gold Coast
14_{R}	Tom Bell	Morningside	Carlton
22_{R}	Stephen Wrigley	Labrador	Brisbane
51_{R}	Simon Tunbridge	Greater Western Sydney	West Coast
57_{R}	Richard Newell	Brisbane	Brisbane
93_{R}	Harry Cunningham	Greater Western Sydney	Sydney
94_{R}	Josh Hall	Gold Coast	Gold Coast
95_{R}	Jack Lynch	Sydney	Sydney
96_{R}	Sam Michael	Redland	Brisbane
—	Dayne Zorko^{1}	Broadbeach	Brisbane
—	Peter Yagmoor^{1}	Morningside	Collingwood

N – national draft
R – rookie draft

== Footnotes ==
Notes
1. QLD zone selection acquired during the 2011 trade period.
