= Traeger Park =

Sports complex in Alice Springs, NT

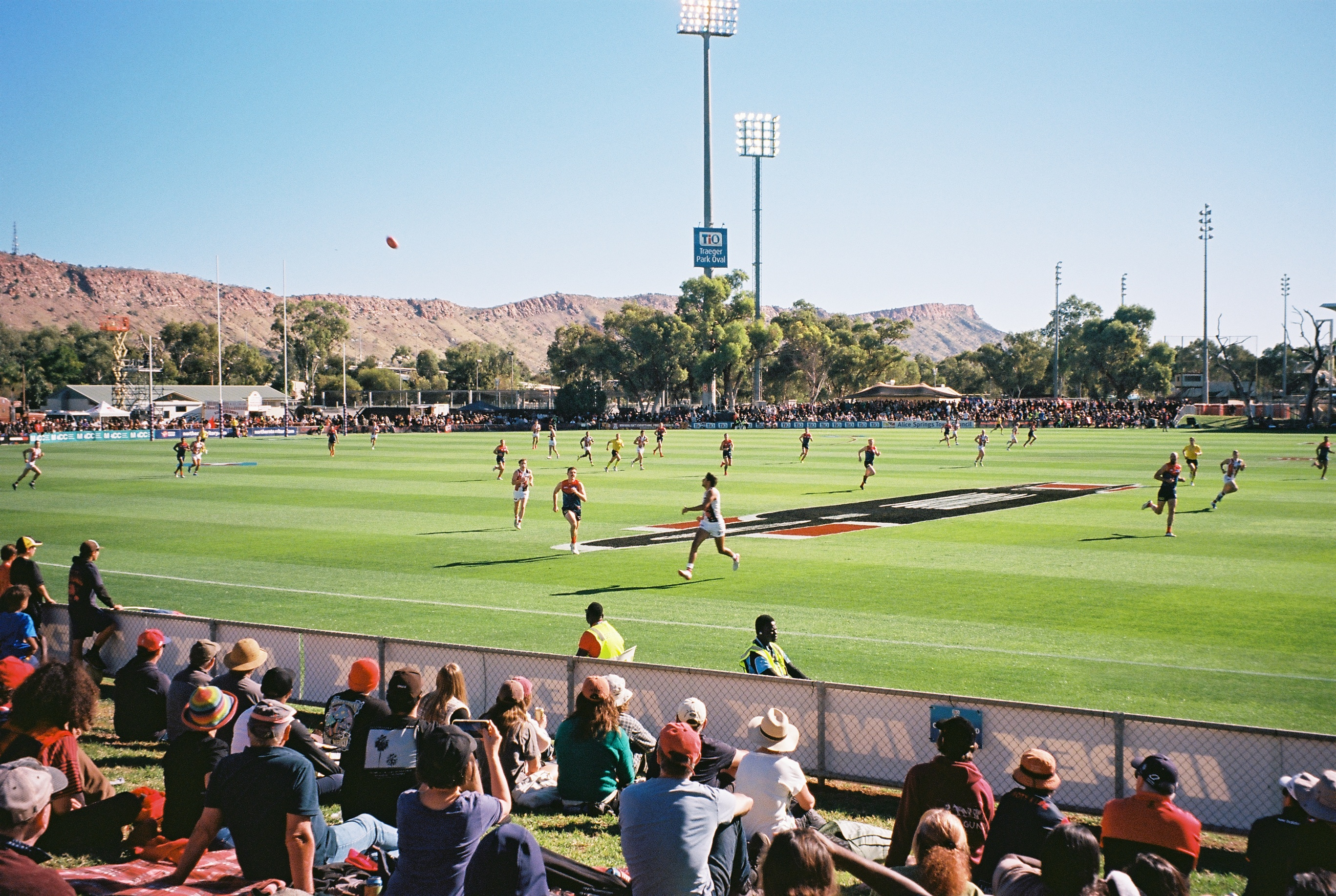
- Interactive map of Traeger Park
- Location: Alice Springs, NT, Australia
- Coordinates: 23.7090°S 133.8751°E
- Operator: Alice Springs Town Council
- Capacity: 7,200
- Field size: 168 m × 132 m (551 ft × 433 ft)

Construction
- Opened: 1991
- Renovated: 2006

Tenants
- AFL Northern Territory; Northern Territory Cricket; Melbourne Football Club (AFL) (2014-present); Adelaide Strikers (BBL) 2017-2018; Hobart Hurricanes (BBL) (2019-present); NT Thunder (QAFL/NEAFL) (2009-2019)

Ground information
- Country: Australia
- Capacity: 7,200
- End names
- Traeger Avenue; MacDonnell Ranges
- As of 20 December 2019; Source: Cricinfo

Traeger Park (currently known under naming rights as TIO Traeger Park) is a sports complex located in Alice Springs, Northern Territory, Australia, in the suburb of The Gap. Named after Alfred Hermann Traeger, the park was officially opened by Anne Catherine Smallwood (née Traeger), Alfred's younger daughter. The primary stadium in the complex caters for Australian rules football and cricket and has a capacity of 7,200. The complex also has a small baseball stadium.

Traeger Park is home to the Central Australian Football League, and also hosts the annual Ngurratjuta Easter Lightning Carnival.

The Melbourne Football Club play one Australian Football League match a season at the venue.

== Sports ==
Traeger Park has occasionally staged pre-season matches for the Australian Football League and National Rugby League. In 2004, an AFL Regional Challenge match between Collingwood Football Club and Port Adelaide Football Club attracted a sell-out crowd of 10,000. In 2006, the West Coast Eagles played the Carlton Football Club in an NAB Cup Regional Challenge match. A trial match between the North Queensland Cowboys and the Brisbane Broncos was played at the ground during the warm-up to the 2011 NRL season.

=== Australian rules football ===
Traeger Park has been hosting AFL preseason games since 2004 with the largest crowd ever at the ground occurring in 2007 between the Adelaide Crows and the West Coast Eagles. The 2011 NEAFL Grand Final was held at the ground as well. The game saw the Northern Territory Thunder defeat the Ainslie Tri-Colours 16.18 (114) to 13.14 (92).

The venue hosted its first ever AFL premiership match on 31 May 2014, with Melbourne shifting its home match against Port Adelaide to the venue. Melbourne has scheduled one match per year at the venue since 2014, often to coincide with the league's Indigenous Round; the 2021 match was cancelled when travel into Northern Territory was restricted by the COVID-19 pandemic.

=== Cricket ===
Traeger Park hosted its first first-class match in February 2015, a Sheffield Shield match between Victoria vs Queensland, owing to the unavailability of both states' usual home grounds during the 2015 World Cup. It became a home-away-from-home for Victoria from then until 2017 whenever the Melbourne Cricket Ground was unavailable, due to no other Victorian venues being first-class standard at the time, and Victoria hosted the final of the 2016–17 Sheffield Shield season at the venue in March 2017.

Dating to as early as 1988, the ground has a history of staging warm-up and tour matches for visiting international Test squads; and since 2004 it has hosted matches in the annual Imparja Cup, a limited overs tournament contested by state and territory teams comprising Indigenous Australian cricketers.

The ground hosted its first Big Bash League match on 13 January 2018, with the Adelaide Strikers taking on the Perth Scorchers.

== Ground upgrades ==
The Northern Territory Government announced in 2002 that $4.2 million would be allocated to upgrading Traeger Park over a ten-year period. The floodlights will be upgraded from 300 lux to 800 lux which will allow televised AFL games. Future light towers will provide a lighting level of 1400 lux which will cater for televised international cricket.

A new 750 kva transformer and high voltage cabling reticulation is required to increase power supply to Traeger Park to cater for the new lights and grandstand facility. The grandstand/multi functional facility will replace the existing Ted Hayes Memorial Stand and is expected to consist of players change rooms and amenities, players dining rooms, umpires change room, first aid room, doctor/physio room, grandstand seating, multipurpose function room, kitchen, corporate rooms, press rooms and third umpire room.

== Attendance records ==
Top 10 sports attendance records

No.	Date	Teams	Sport	Competition	Crowd
1	9 March 2007	Adelaide Crows v. West Coast Eagles	Australian Rules Football	AFL (preseason)	11,000
2	5 March 2004	Collingwood Magpies v. Port Adelaide Power	Australian Rules Football	AFL (preseason)	10,000
3	10 March 2006	Carlton Blues v. West Coast Eagles	Australian Rules Football	AFL (preseason)	8,500
4	8 February 2013	Indigenous All-Stars v. Richmond Tigers	Australian Rules Football	AFL (preseason)	8,350
5	4 March 2005	Fremantle Dockers v. Richmond Tigers	Australian Rules Football	AFL (preseason)	7,500
6	21 July 2019	Melbourne Demons v. West Coast Eagles	Australian Rules Football	AFL	7,164
7	27 May 2018	Melbourne Demons v. Adelaide Crows	Australian Rules Football	AFL	6,989
8	1 June 2025	Melbourne Demons v. St Kilda Saints	Australian Rules Football	AFL	6,721
9	17 July 2022	Melbourne Demons v. Port Adelaide Power	Australian Rules Football	AFL	6,312
10	2 June 2024	Melbourne Demons v. Fremantle Dockers	Australian Rules Football	AFL	6,109

^{Last updated on 6 January 2026}
