= Daniel Currie =

Australian rules footballer

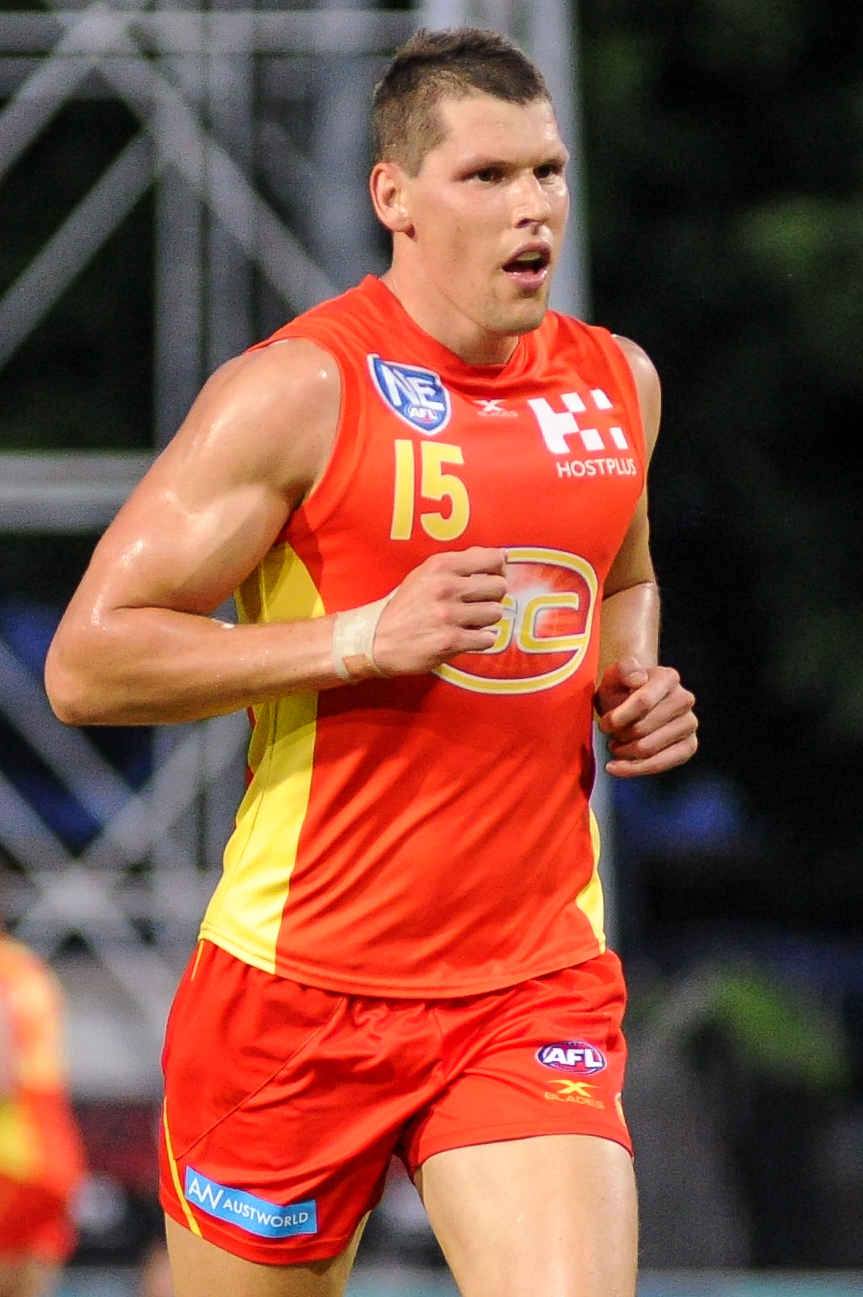
- Currie in May 2017

Personal information
- Full name: Daniel Currie
- Born: 15 February 1989 (age 37)
- Original team: Northern Knights /Eltham / Parade College
- Draft: No. 49 2006, Sydney Swans; No. 56 2012, North Melbourne
- Height: 201 cm (6 ft 7 in)
- Weight: 96 kg (212 lb)
- Position: Ruck

Playing career^{1}
Years	Club	Games (Goals)
2007–2011	Sydney	0 (0)
2013–2015	North Melbourne	4 (3)
2016–2017	Gold Coast	6 (3)
Total		10 (6)
- ^{1} Playing statistics correct to the end of 2017.

Daniel Currie (born 15 February 1989) is a former professional Australian rules footballer who played for the North Melbourne Football Club and Gold Coast Football Club in the Australian Football League. Currie was originally drafted to the Sydney Swans with the 49th selection in the 2006 AFL draft, but was delisted by the Swans at the end of 2011 without having made his AFL debut. Currie is currently employed as a Risk Consultant for professional services firm, KPMG.

Through the years of 2007, 2008 and 2009 Currie sustained numerous and injuries whilst plying his trade in the reserves. His 2010 season was much improved however as he managed to finally get his body right and play the vast majority of the year. He was unable to break into the seniors side due to the emergence of Mike Pyke and the outstanding form of Shane Mumford. He found it difficult to find a spot in the 2011 seniors side as well with Mark Seaby also competing for a position. He was delisted at the end of the season.

Currie moved to South Australia to play for North Adelaide in the South Australian National Football League in 2012. By the end of the season, he was suggested as a potential replacement for Kurt Tippett who left Adelaide, but he was recruited by North Melbourne with the 56th selection in the 2012 AFL draft.

In October 2015, he was traded to Gold Coast. He was delisted by Gold Coast at the conclusion of the 2017 season.
