= Zephaniah Skinner =

Australian rules footballer

Personal information
- Full name: Zephaniah Skinner
- Born: 27 June 1989 (age 37); Noonkanbah Station, Western Australia
- Original team: Nightcliff (NTFL)
- Draft: No. 88, 2010 National Draft, Western Bulldogs
- Height: 189 cm (6 ft 2 in)
- Weight: 79 kg (174 lb)
- Position: Forward

Playing career^{1}
| Years | Club | Games (Goals) |
| 2011–2012 | Western Bulldogs | 8 (5) |
- ^{1} Playing statistics correct to the end of Round 22 2012.

Zephaniah Skinner (born 27 June 1989) is an Australian rules footballer who played for the Western Bulldogs in the Australian Football League.

A Yungngora man, Skinner was born at Noonkanbah Station, several hundred kilometres east of Broome, Western Australia. Skinner was taken at number 88 in the 2010 AFL draft.

Making his debut during the 2011 AFL season, Skinner retired from AFL football at the end of the 2012 season.
