= Coomera Magpies Australian Football Club =

Coomera Magpies

Names
- Full name: Coomera Australian Football Club
- Nickname: Magpies
- Motto: QAFL

2018 season

Club details
- Founded: 2009; 17 years ago
- Colours

Uniforms
Home

Other information
- Official website: Coomera Magpies

Coomera Australian Football Club (nicknamed The Magpies) is an Australian rules football club based in Gold Coast, Queensland. The team currently competes in the QFA South league.

== Club history Summary ==
In 1997 due to growth within the Northern Gold Coast, a group of local residents formed the Coomera River AFC with the assistance of AFLQ. Club colours where Maroon and Gold and the mascot was The Cowboys. The Foundation day was held on 17 June 1997. Establishing a home ground at Coomera Hope Island Cricket Club then Viney Park Coomera and eventually moving to their current home at the Coomera Sports Park. Within two years, teams consisted of Australian Football for Juniors, Old boys, Ladies AFL & Girls Netball teams. Whilst at Coomera Hope Island Cricket Ground community markets were also managed with up to 100 stalls to raise funds for the club's future. In 2000 changes within the club meant the name became the Coomera Magpies JAFC.

The Coomera Australian Football Club (seniors) was formed on 7 September 2009 adopting black and white colours and the Magpies Logo in alignment with the Junior club.

In 2010, the seniors competed in the State Association Division 3 Central competition fielding one team, finishing 2nd on the ladder for the season. The Magpies' first game was on 16 May 2010, against Yeronga. The Magpies went on to win the clash 14.5.89 to 4.6.30. The senior club had a successful first season, finishing the home and away season second on the ladder, with eight wins and four losses. Coomera played in their first ever final against the undefeated Jimboomba Redbacks at Glen Logan Park. After putting up a great fight they eventually went down by three goals. Jimboomba would go on to be premiers. Coomera played the reigning premiers "The Woodsmen" the following week but were defeated and knocked out of the finals race.

In 2011, after having overwhelming support from the local community and player numbers too high to cater for, the Coomera Magpies applied to enter and were accepted into the AFLQ State Association DIV 2 for the 2011 season. the seniors entered the State Association DIV 2. Allowing the club to field a reserves team and form an under 18's side, providing a pathway into senior football for young footballers in the Northern Gold Coast. The 2011 Season saw the club's senior team finish fourth; the reserves fifth; and the Under 18s seventh. The seniors won the first final against Caboolture by 20 points.

In 2012 AFLQ State Association DIV 2 was renamed SEQAFL Div 3.

In 2013, The Magpies progressed to the SEQ AFL Div. 3 and won their first Senior Premiership Flag. With the senior side winning the SEQAFL Div 3 title. The reserves side also made it to the Grand Final, but unfortunately lost. The success of the 2013 season saw the club get promoted to the newly formed AFLQ QFA South Competition in 2014, joining the likes of Springwood, Coorparoo and Burleigh. They are still in this competition this season

In 2014, the Magpies entered the QFA South Division where we currently play in 2016. Success has meant Major Sponsor Stacer Marine & Bendigo Bank from 2009 are still Major Sponsors in 2016. The Coomera Magpies consist of 500 players across Juniors, Seniors & Masters. We are a community-based club providing a great environment for families to enjoy our great game and are proud to be a part of the celebration of 150 years of Australian Rules Football in Queensland.

In Depth History:

In late 1996 discussions between the Gold Coast Junior AFL and local resident Russ Hill who was also on the GCJAFL executive began, to discuss the forming of a new AFL club on the northern end of the Gold Coast due to growth in the area. In early 1997 Auskick programmes were held at surrounding schools with the assistance of AFLQ. Schools included Woongoolba, Pimpama, Ormeau, Oxenford, Pacific Pines & Coomera State Schools. The programme proved to be a huge success and having 3 times as many Auskickers as all other Junior clubs on the Gold Coast combined legitimising the need for a northern Junior AFL Club.

Home Grounds:

1997 - 1998 Coomera Hope Island Cricket Ground – Oxenford 1998 - 1999 Vinney Park Coomera – using the scout hall as club rooms. 2000 - 2001 Coomera Hope Island Cricket Ground – Oxenford 2002 - Current Coomera Sports Park, Beatie Rd, Coomera

Old Boys Competition:

1998 - 1999 Gold Coast

Junior AFL 1997 – Current Gold Coast Junior AFL

Ladies AFL: 1998 – 2000 Sth East QLD 2017 – Current

Girls Netball: 1998 – 2000 Northern Gold Coast Netball Association

Seniors Competition:

2010 - State association Div 3 Central 2011 - State Association Div 2 2012 - SEQAFL Div 3 2013 - SEQAFL Div 3 2014 - QFA South 2015 - QFA South 2016 - QFA South

Masters Competition:

2015 - Qld Masters Gold Coast 2016 - Qld Masters Gold Coast

Prior to the 1997 football season, an IGM was held forming the Coomera River (Cowboys) Australian Football Club & electing Russ Hill as president, Dave Aitken as vice president, Marcia Hill as secretary & Dave Reineker as treasurer. Over the summer of 1997 /1998, seniors competed in the 9 Aside competition at Surfers Paradise. Players formed the Old Boys team for 1998 with Warrick Capper as captain. Also in 1998 a ladies team was formed and junior girls netball teams.

In 2003 the juniors changed their name to the Coomera Magpies Junior AFC and the Old Boys separated from the juniors and eventually folded a few years later, the girls netball and ladies teams also folded in 2000. Over the next 8 years, the juniors continued, however, by 2009 realised they needed a pathway for older juniors, the process of starting a senior club unfolded.

The Coomera Australian Football Club was formed on 7 September 2009. Its IGM was held at the Lost City at Upper Coomera. There were 25 people in attendance and nominations were taken from the floor to form and elect the first committee for the senior club. The outcome was: President – Ken McPherson, Secretary – Russel Hill, Treasurer – Wayne Johnstone & Marcia Hill was appointed as Registrar / Apparel Convenor. Coomera took on the Magpies as there Logo and signed an MOU with the Junior club that had been established since 1997.

In 2010, the seniors competed in the State Association Division 3 Central competition fielding one team. After a tireless summer, inaugural Captain/coach Damian Hofert led the Magpies to play their first game on 16 May 2010, against Yeronga. The Magpies went on to win the clash 14.5.89 to 4.6.30 with Hofert kicking the first ever goal only minutes into the game. The club had a successful first season and finishing the home and away season 2nd on the ladder. Picking up major sponsor STACER MARINE & Bendigo Bank, who are still major sponsors in 2016. After having overwhelming support from the local community and player numbers too high to cater for, the Coomera Magpies applied to enter and were accepted into the State Association DIV 2 for the 2011 season. This allowed the club to field a reserves team and start an under 18's side which provided a pathway into senior football for young footballers in the Northern Gold Coast.

In 2011 season Garry Smith was elected as president who, at the age of 26, would be the youngest president in Australia. During 2011, the Coomera Magpies established themselves as a revered opponent, a family club, and a respected community group. Being the Gold Coast face of the "Donate for you State" campaign ran by the red cross as well as running the Coomera Magpies Flood Cleanup and Relief Drive which collected and distributed 2 Semi loads of Furniture, bedding, toys and food to flood effected families.

In 2012 the Magpies progressed to the SEQAFL Div 3 and in 2013 won the Premiership Flag in this division.

In 2014 they entered the QFA South Division where they currently play in 2016. As the Magpies Seniors continue to grow with community support so does their player base. 2015 saw the introduction of their Masters team into the Qld Masters competition on the Gold Coast.

Currently, the Coomera Magpies consist of 300 Juniors, 100 seniors & 40 Masters players Plus 30 plus Ladies AFL members.
