= Dean Howard (footballer) =

Australian rules footballer

Personal information
- Full name: Dean Howard
- Born: 29 July 1976 (age 50)
- Original team: West Adelaide (SANFL) / Broadbeach (QAFL)
- Height: 179 cm (5 ft 10 in)
- Weight: 82 kg (181 lb)

Playing career^{1}
Years	Club	Games (Goals)
1999	Adelaide	2 (0)
- ^{1} Playing statistics correct to the end of 1999.

Dean Howard (born 29 July 1976) is a former Australian rules footballer who played with Adelaide in the Australian Football League (AFL).

Howard, a midfielder, was recruited from West Adelaide but came from the Gold Coast originally. After being promoted from the rookie list, Howard made two appearances for Adelaide midway through the 1999 AFL season, against Essendon at Football Park and Fremantle at Subiaco.

He didn't play any more games for Adelaide but remained in the SANFL, first with West Adelaide and then at North Adelaide for the 2006 season.

Howard returned to Queensland in 2008 and began playing for his junior club, Broadbeach.
