= Carrara Saints =

Names
- Full name: Carrara Australian Football Club
- Nickname: Saints
- Motto: Strength through Loyalty
- Club song: "When the Saints go marching in"

2018 season
- After finals: 3rd

Club details
- Founded: 1998; 27 years ago
- Colours
- President: Michael Spitte
- Ground: Alan Neilsen Oval, Neilsons Road, Carrara

Uniforms
Home

Other information
- Official website: carrarasaints.club

Carrara Australian Football Club (nicknamed The Saints) is a Carrara based club competing in the SEQAFL Div 3 Australian rules football competition & also caters for teams in junior & youth divisions AFLQGC juniors .

== Origins ==
Carrara Saints AFL Club is a junior and senior Aussie Rules club located on Nielsons Road Carrara, only a stone's throw from The Gold Coast Suns home ground, Heritage Bank Stadium.

The Saints have teams from ages 5/6 to 16 years for boys & girls as well as men's senior/reserve teams and also Masters teams

The junior club was established in 1998 with various teams taking out the premiership for their age group in their division

The senior club was established in 2012 and won their first premiership in 2018.

Carrara Saints Masters established 2016.

=== Division Four (2012) ===
After a promising season of blooding youngsters to the rigours of senior football, the club finish last with 4 wins.

=== Division Three (2013) ===
The club was promoted to Division 3 of the AFLSEQ. The team finished the year with 4 1/2 wins.

=== QAFA (A) (2014) ===
Another competition restructure the club will compete in the Queensland Amateurs A grade.
