= Kombumerri Park =

Aboriginal burial ground and sporting venue

Coordinates: 28°02′21″S 153°25′11″E

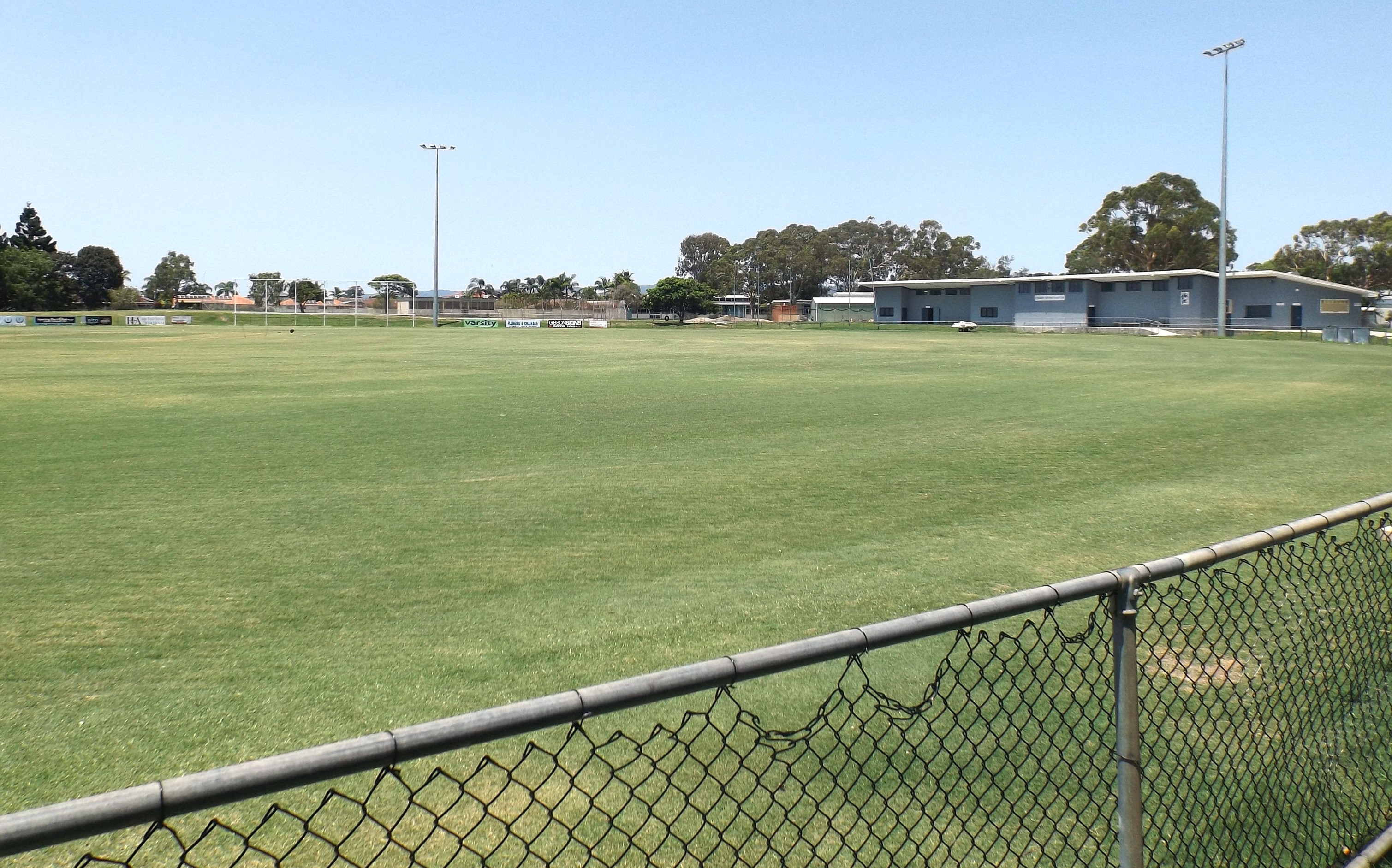
- Kombumerri Park in November 2015
- Interactive map of Kombumerri Park
- Former names: Merrimac Oval; H & A Oval
- Address: Mermaid Waters, Queensland
- Location: Dunlop Court
- Owner: Gold Coast City Council
- Capacity: 6,500
- Surface: Grass

Construction
- Opened: Unknown

Tenants
- Broadbeach Cats, NEAFL; Gold Coast Suns Reserves, NEAFL; Broadbeach-Robina Cricket Club

Kombumerri Park (known commercially as Subaru Oval) is a multi-sports venue in Mermaid Waters, a suburb in the Gold Coast, Australia. It includes an Australian Rules Football and Cricket ground.

Before British colonisation, a large area around Kombumerri Park was used as a cemetery by the resident Kombumerri clan of Indigenous Australians. The oldest known interment was conducted around 1,300 years ago and it was still being used as a ceremonial burial ground by Aboriginal people up til the 1880s. A major excavation of the site in the 1960s found the remains of least 200 people. These were repatriated to the local Aboriginal community and reburied at Kombumerri Park in the 1980s.

It has been used by the NEAFL's Broadbeach Australian Football Club team as their home game base. The Gold Coast Suns reserves side also occasionally uses the ground for home matches.

The Geelong Cats senior side used the ground for training in July 2017, with thousands of spectators coming along to watch them.

== See also ==
- Sports on the Gold Coast, Queensland
