= Broadbeach Australian Football Club =

Broadbeach

Names
- Full name: Broadbeach Australian Football Club
- Nickname: Cats

2026 QAFL season
- After finals: 7th (Elimination Final)
- Home-and-away season: 7th

Club details
- Founded: 1971; 55 years ago
- Colours
- Competition: QAFL
- President: Dale Perkins
- Coach: Craig O'Brien
- Captain: Matthew Fowler
- Premierships: QAFL: 1 (2021)
- Ground: Kombumerri Park (capacity: 10,000)

Uniforms
Home

Other information
- Official website: broadbeachcats.com.au

The Broadbeach Australian Football Club (Broadbeach AFC), nicknamed the Cats, is an Australian rules football club representing the suburb of Broadbeach on the Gold Coast. The club competes in the Queensland Australian Football League after having previously competed in North East Australian Football League. Its home ground is Nee Merrimac Oval (known as Subaru Oval for sponsorship reasons).

The senior level won its first premiership in 1987 under coach Wayne Ling And captain Brian Rowe. The highest point of the club's history was in 1996, when the club won 3 of the Grades, Colts, Seconds and Firsts.

Despite having been in existence since 1971, the Broadbeach Football Club has only competed at the top AFLQ level since 1997.

In 2005, the Cats were one of eight inaugural members of Queensland football's new First Division set-up, and they once again reached the finals.

In 2011, the club was granted permission to enter the NEAFL. The club exited the NEAFL at the end of 2013.

In 2019 Beau Zorko took over as senior coach after life member, and premiership captain 1996 Brett Andrews resigned at the end of 2018 due to family commitments. In February 2020 the club announced the resignation of Beau Zorko, being replaced by Craig O’Brien as senior coach, growing tensions between the two.

== Competitions ==
- 1971–1996 Gold Coast Australian Football League
- 1997–2010, 2014– Queensland Australian Football League
- 2011–2013 North East Australian Football League

== Premierships (3) ==
No.	Year	Competition	Opponent	Score	Venue
1	1987	GCAFL	Palm Beach Currumbin Lions	16.16 (112) – 9.8 (62)	Salk Oval
2	1996	GCAFL	Labrador Tigers	12.16 (88) – 5.14 (44)	Kombumerri Park
3	2021	QAFL	Maroochydore Roos	14.6 (90) – 8.4 (52)	Fankhauser Reserve

== Grogan Medallists ==
- David Round – 2005
- Blake Erickson – 2018
- Jordan Moncrieff – 2021
- Kwaby Boakye – 2023

== AFL/AFLW Drafted Players ==
- Nick Riewoldt
- Jake Rogers
- Lachie Weller
- Will Ashcroft
- Bodhi Uwland
- Bailey Scott
- David Hale
- Dayne Zorko
- Luke Mcguane
- Ricky Petterd
- Trent Knobel
- Alex Davies
- Nathan Ablett
- Joel Wilkinson
- Dean Howard
- Dee Heslop
- Serene Watson
- Lucy Single
- Maddison Levi

== Theme song ==
The theme song of the Broadbeach Cats uses the melody of the Battle Hymn of the Republic. This tune is also used by the Subiaco Lions.

Broadbeach are the leaders in the game of Aussie rules,

Broadbeach are the leaders in the game of Aussie rules,

Anyone who doubts us are a bunch of bloody fools

As the Cats go marching on!

Glory, glory up the Broadbeach!

Glory, glory up the Broadbeach!

Glory, glory up the Broadbeach!

As the Cats go marching on!
