= List of VFL/AFL and AFL Women's players from Queensland =

This is a list of players from Queensland to have played in the Australian Football League (AFL) and the AFL Women's (AFLW), the two pre-eminent competitions of Australian rules football.

== List of players ==
=== Men's ===
Since the debut of Brisbane born and raised Erwin Dornau in 1948 more than 180 Queenslanders as at 2020 had played in the AFL, well over half of them made their debuts in the 21st century.

==== Current Players ====
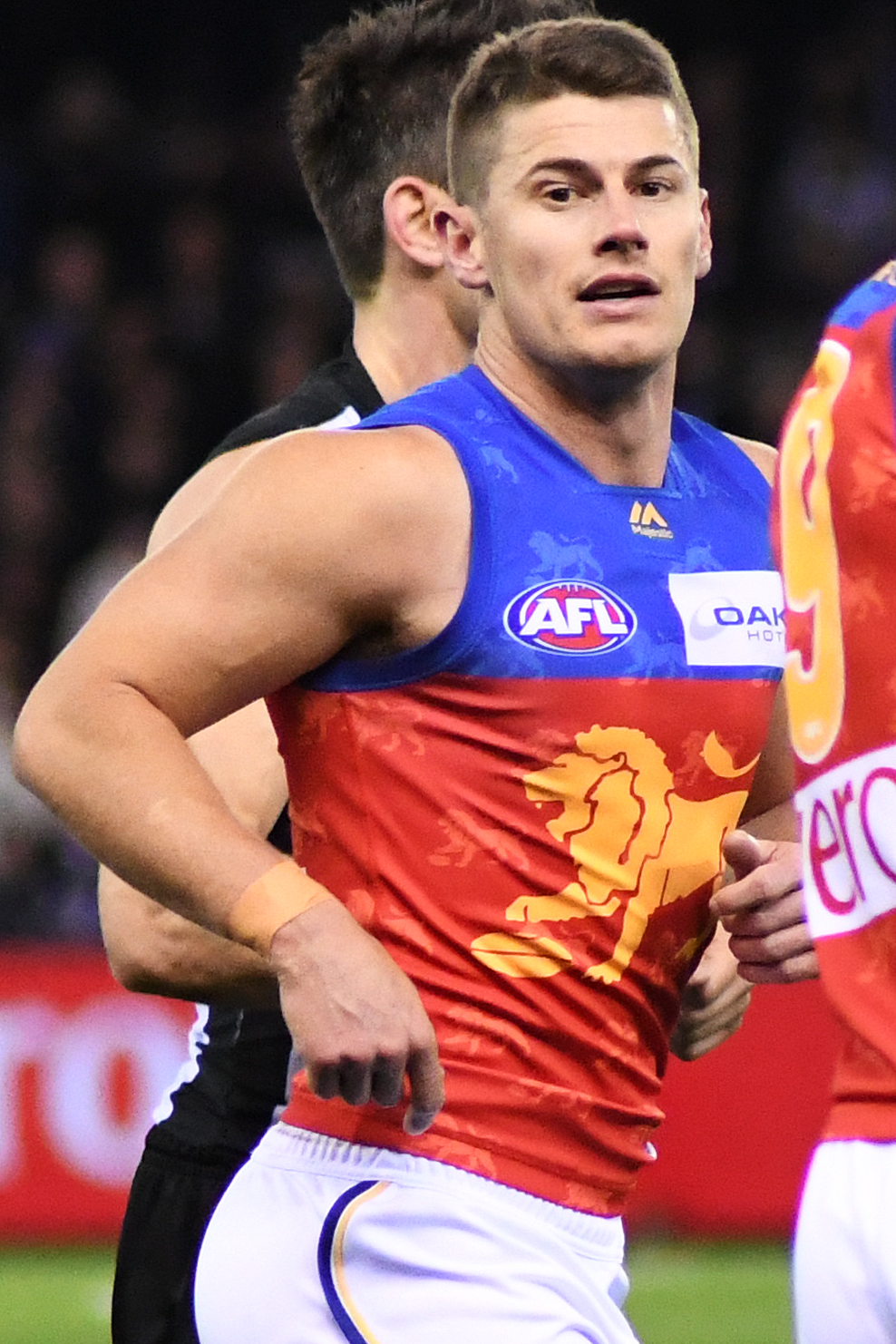
Dayne Zorko is from the Gold Coast

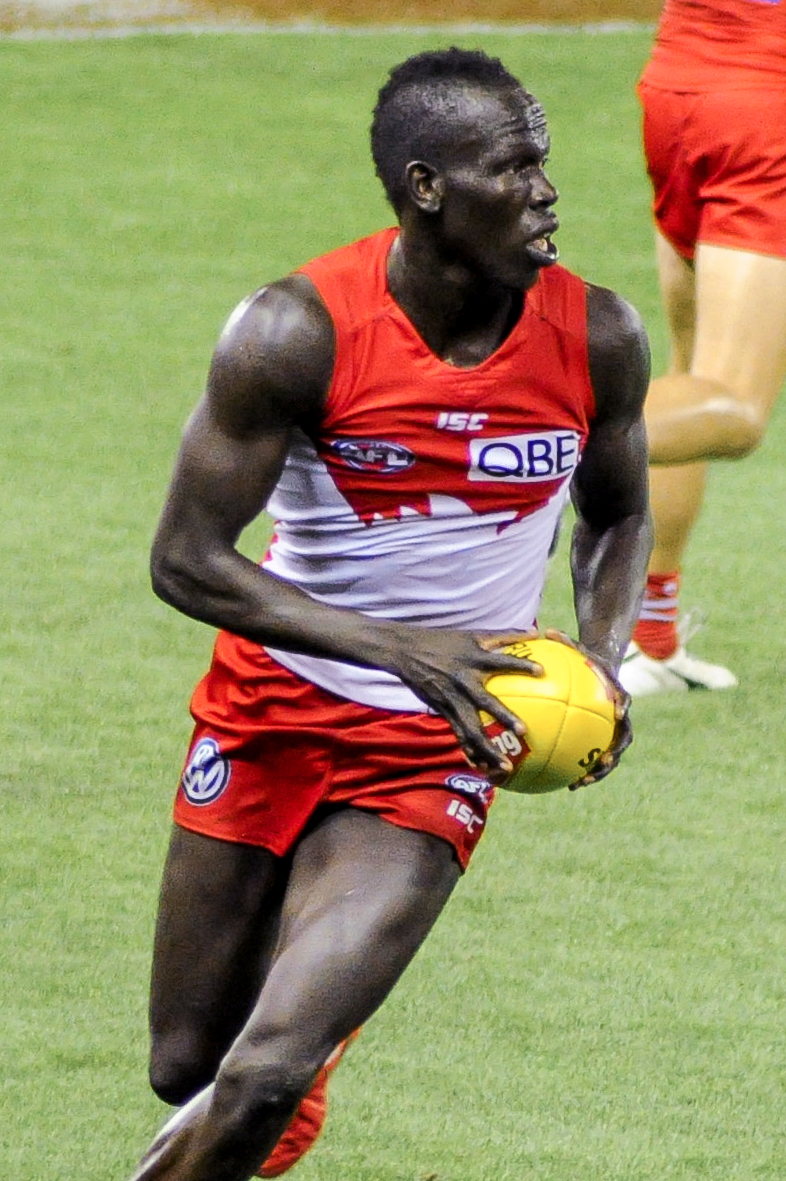
Aliir Mayom Aliir All-Australian was schooled in Brisbane

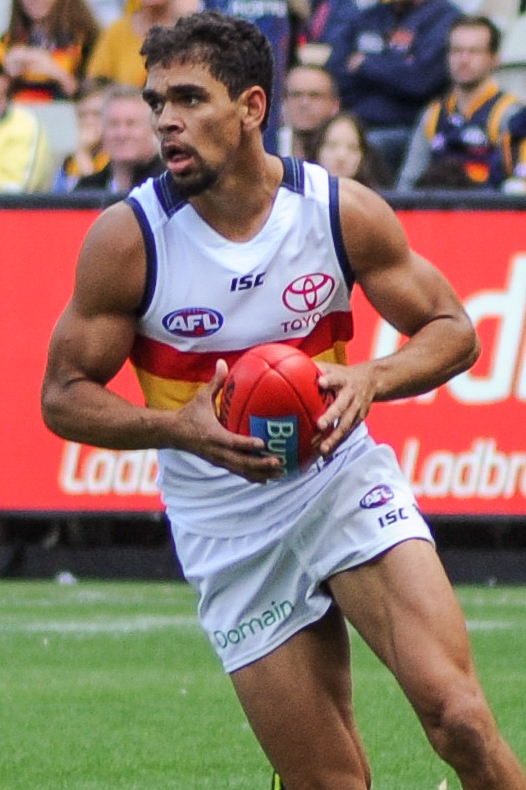
Charlie Cameron is from Mount Isa and Mornington Island

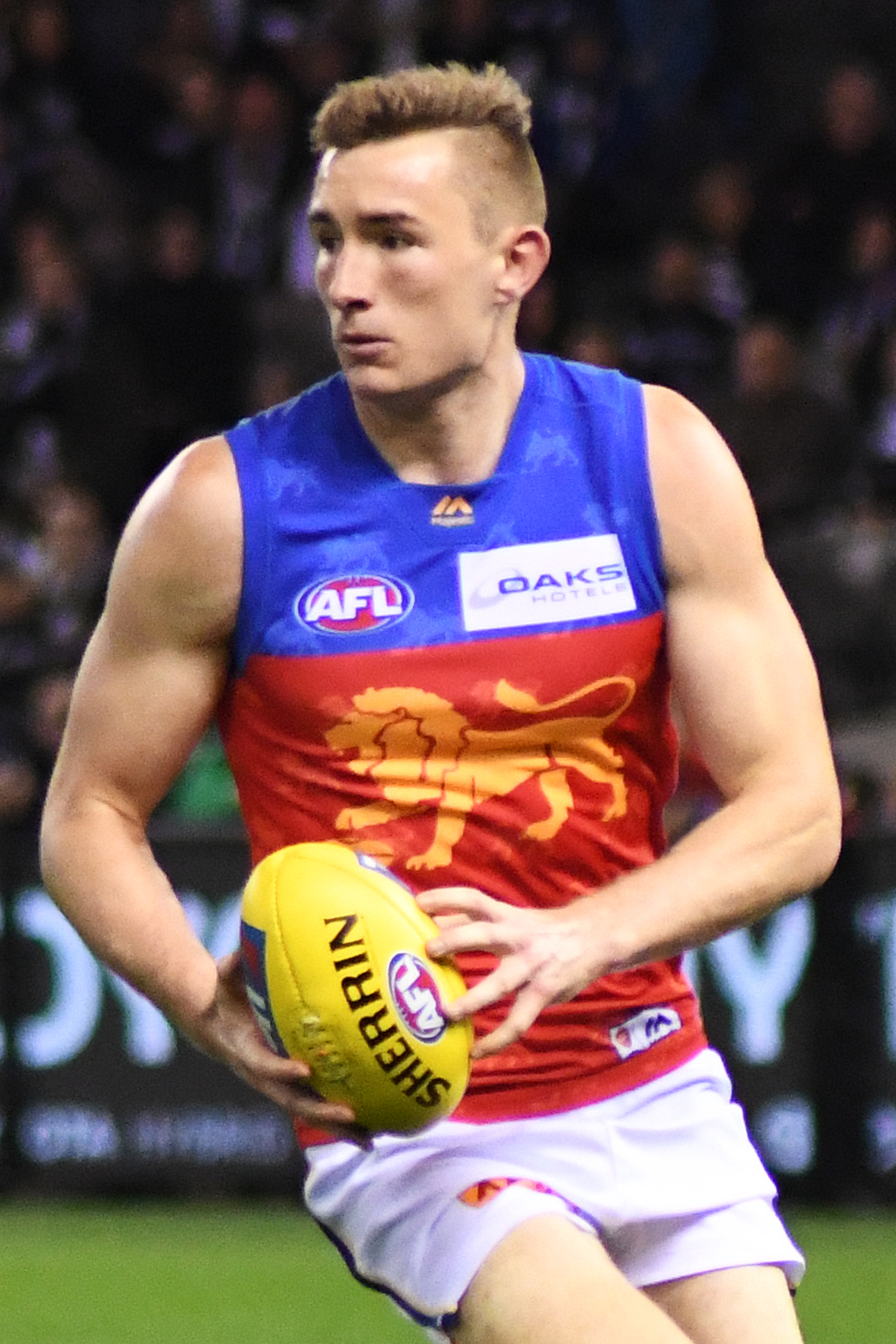
Harris Andrews was raised in Brisbane

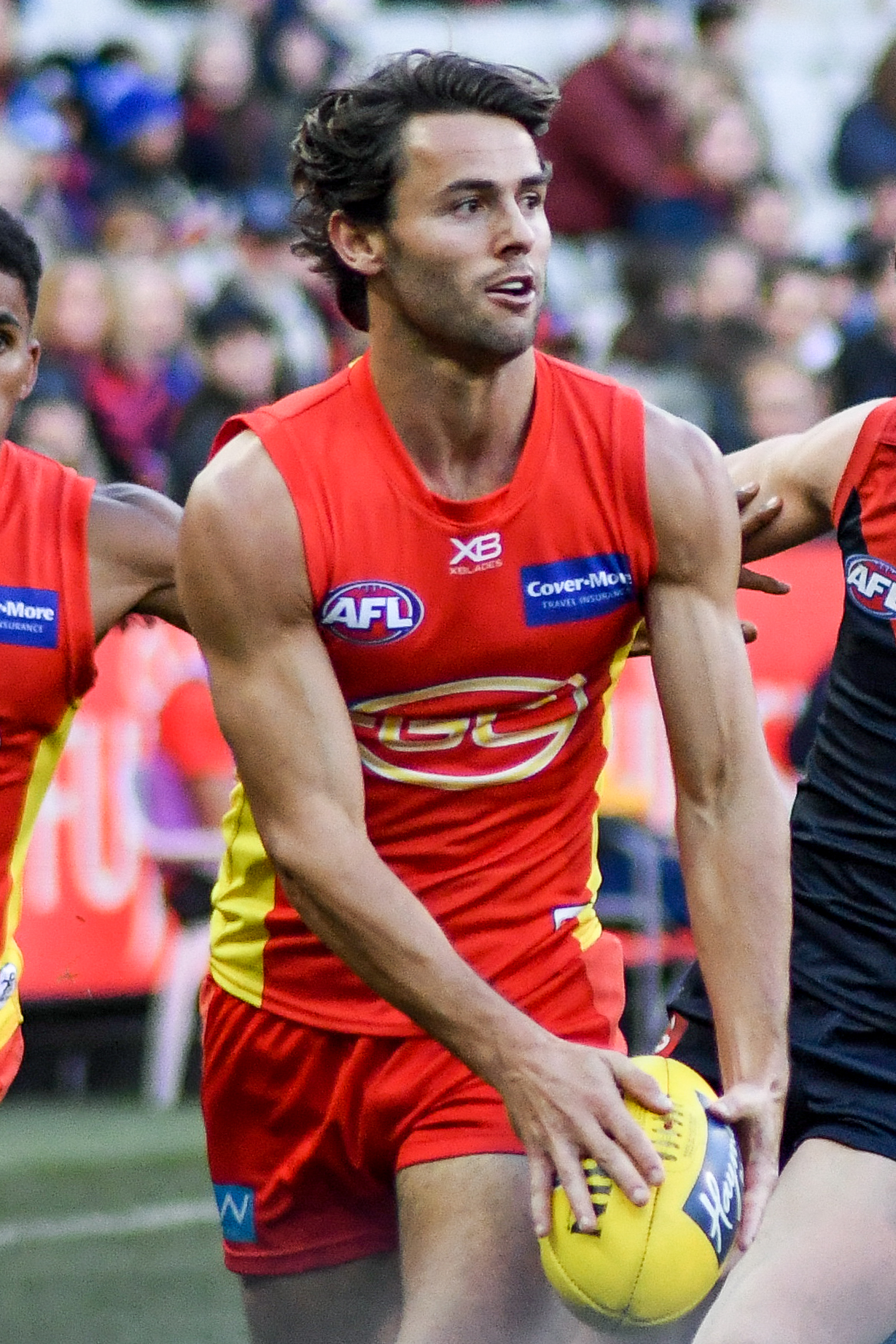
Lachie Weller was raised on the Gold Coast

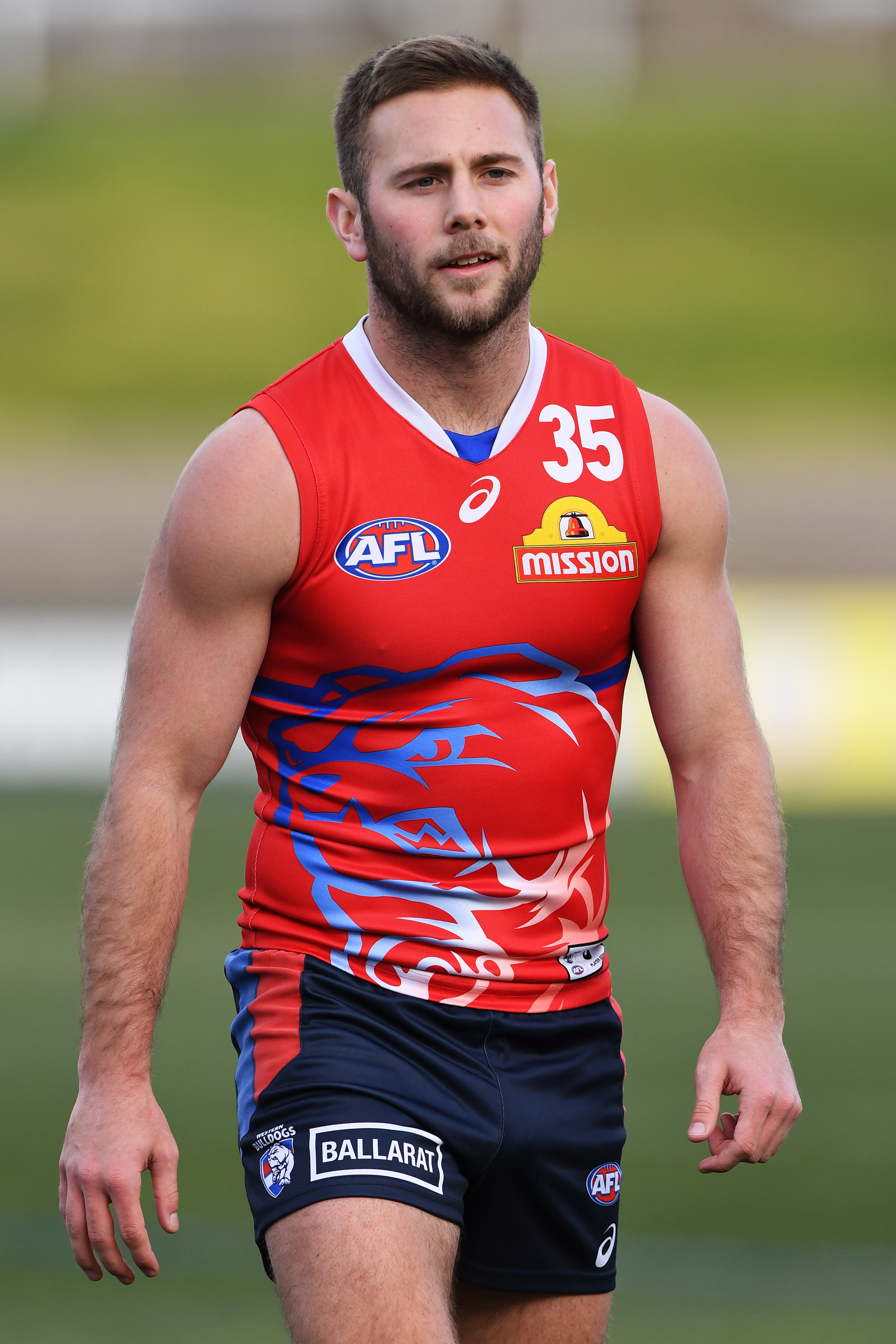
Caleb Daniel All-Australian is from Beaudesert

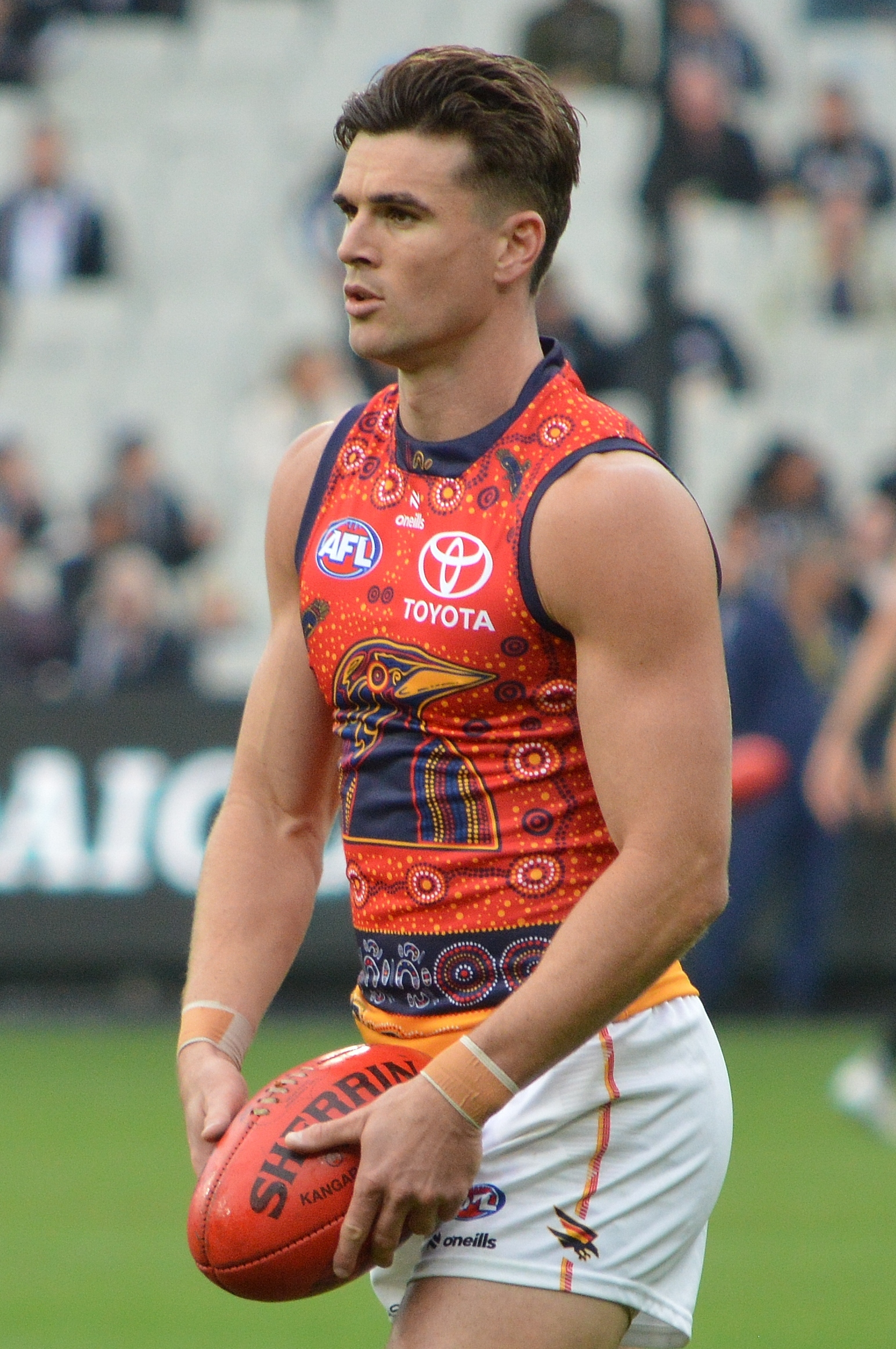
Ben Keays was raised in Brisbane

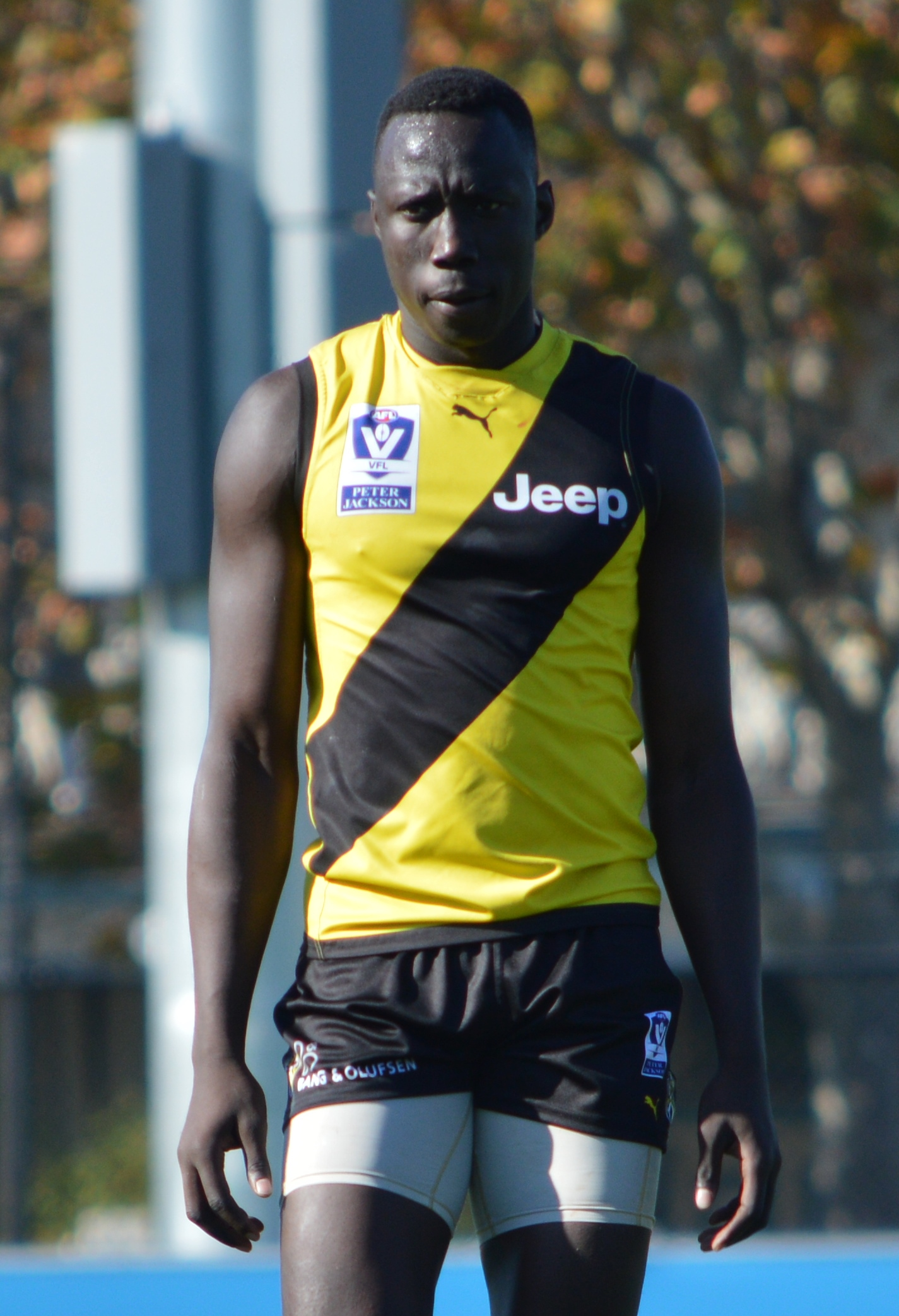
Mabior Chol was raised in Acacia Ridge in Brisbane

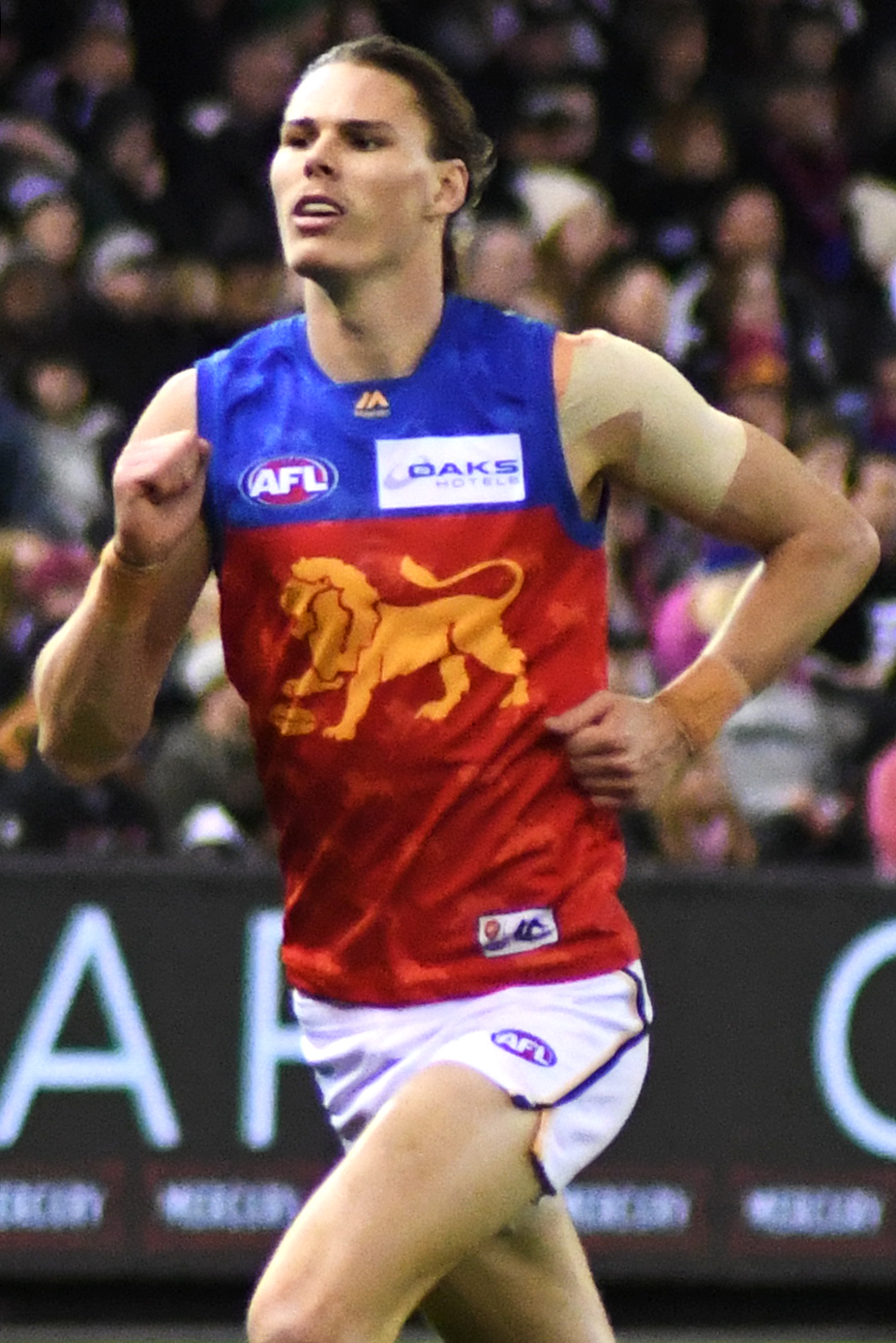
Eric Hipwood was raised on the Sunshine Coast

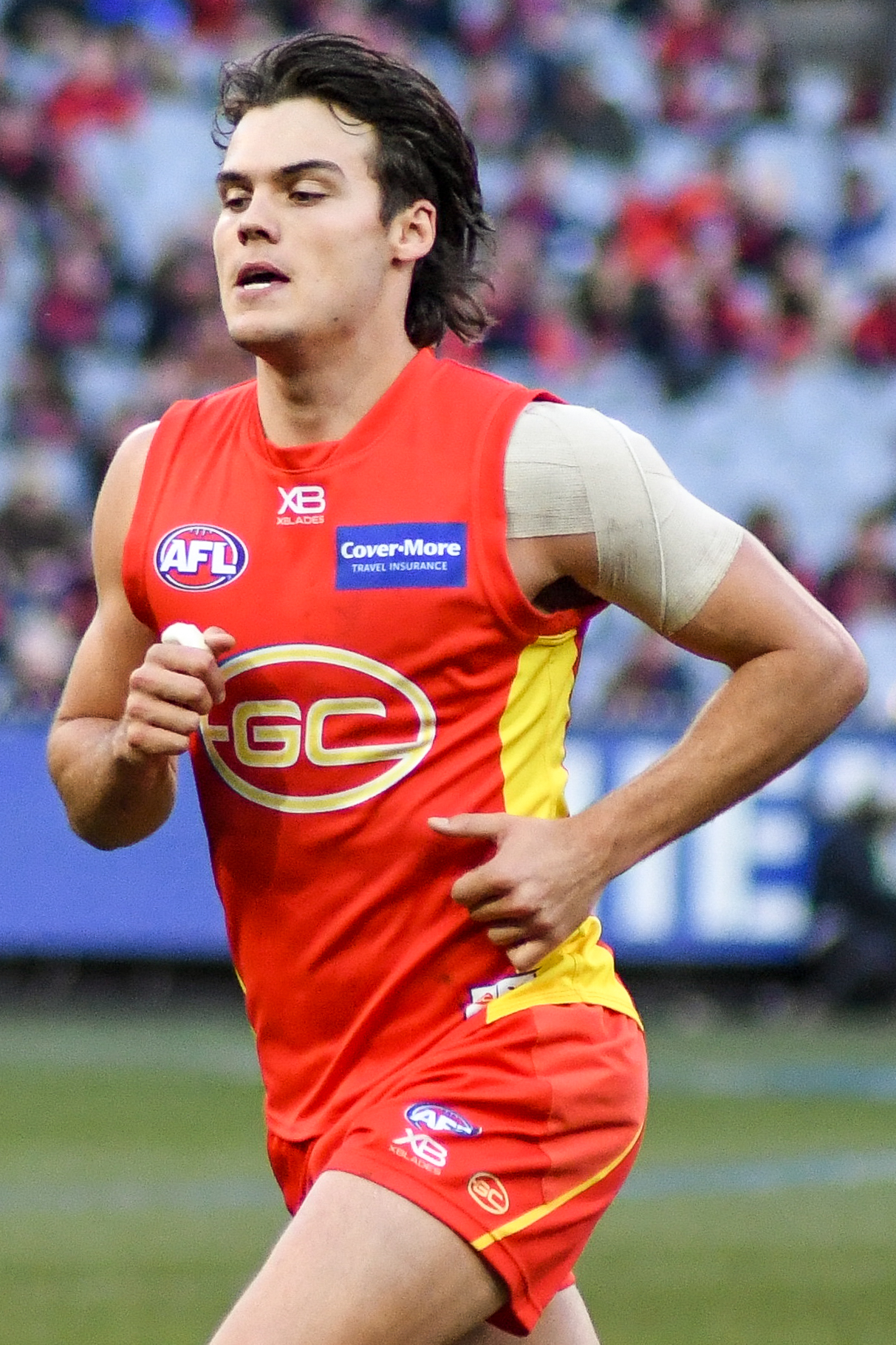
Jack Bowes is from Cairns

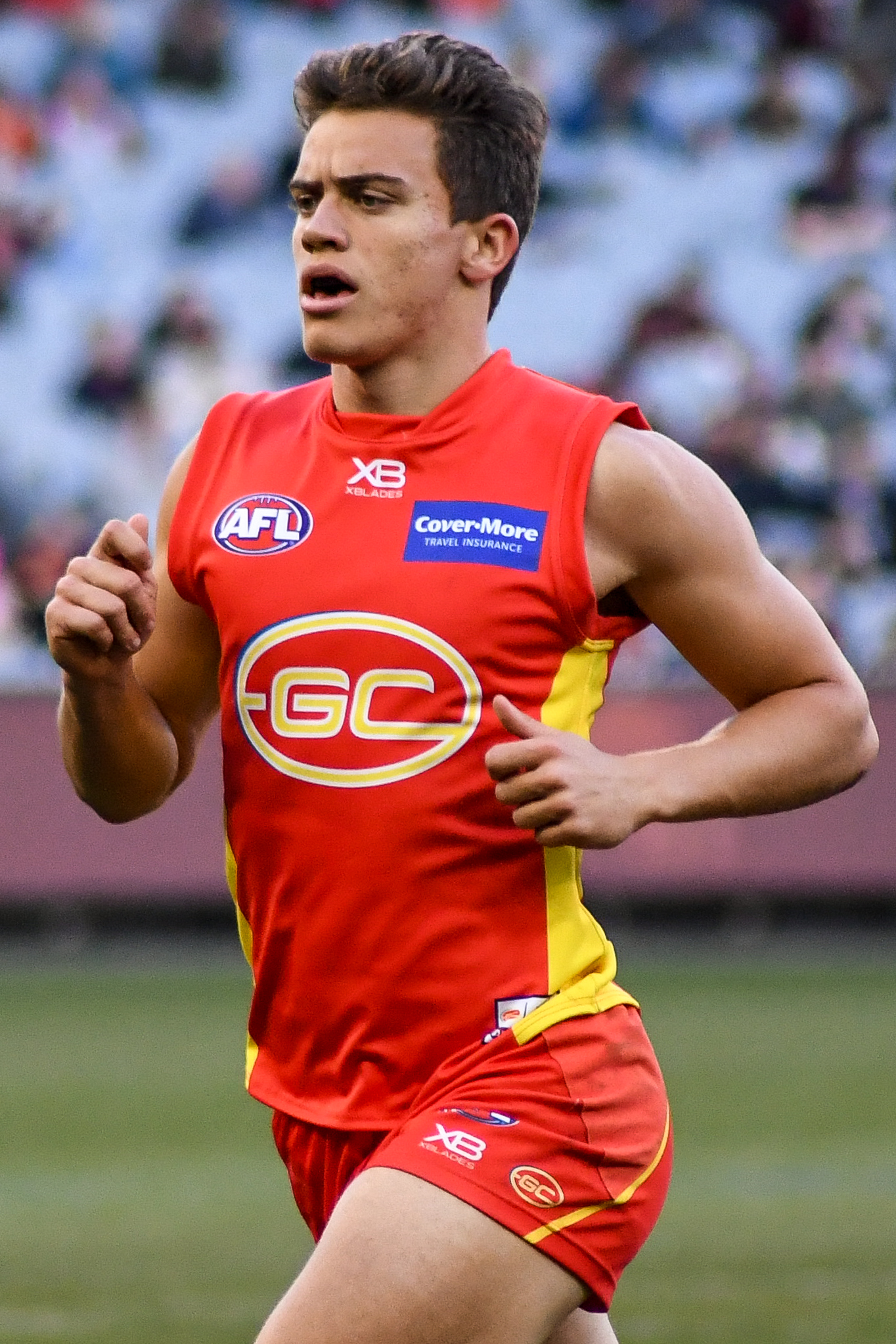
Jacob Heron is from Cairns

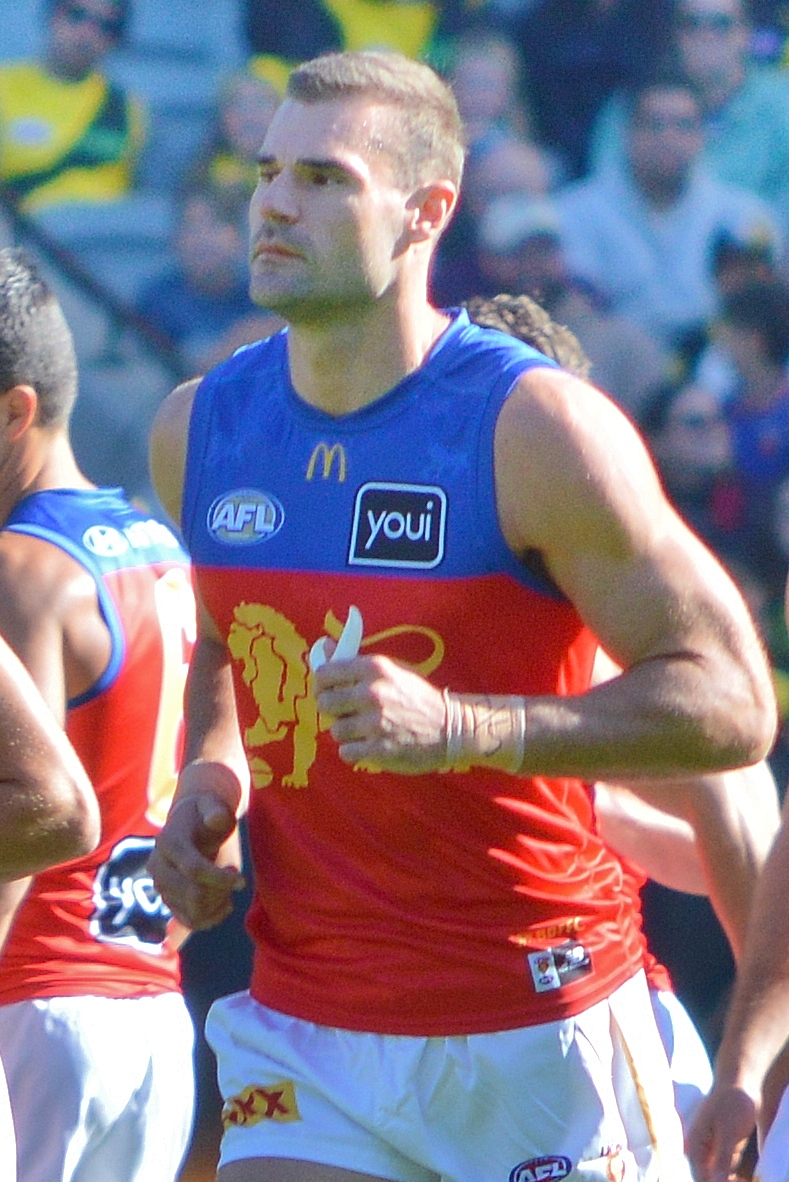
Jack Payne is from the Sunshine Coast

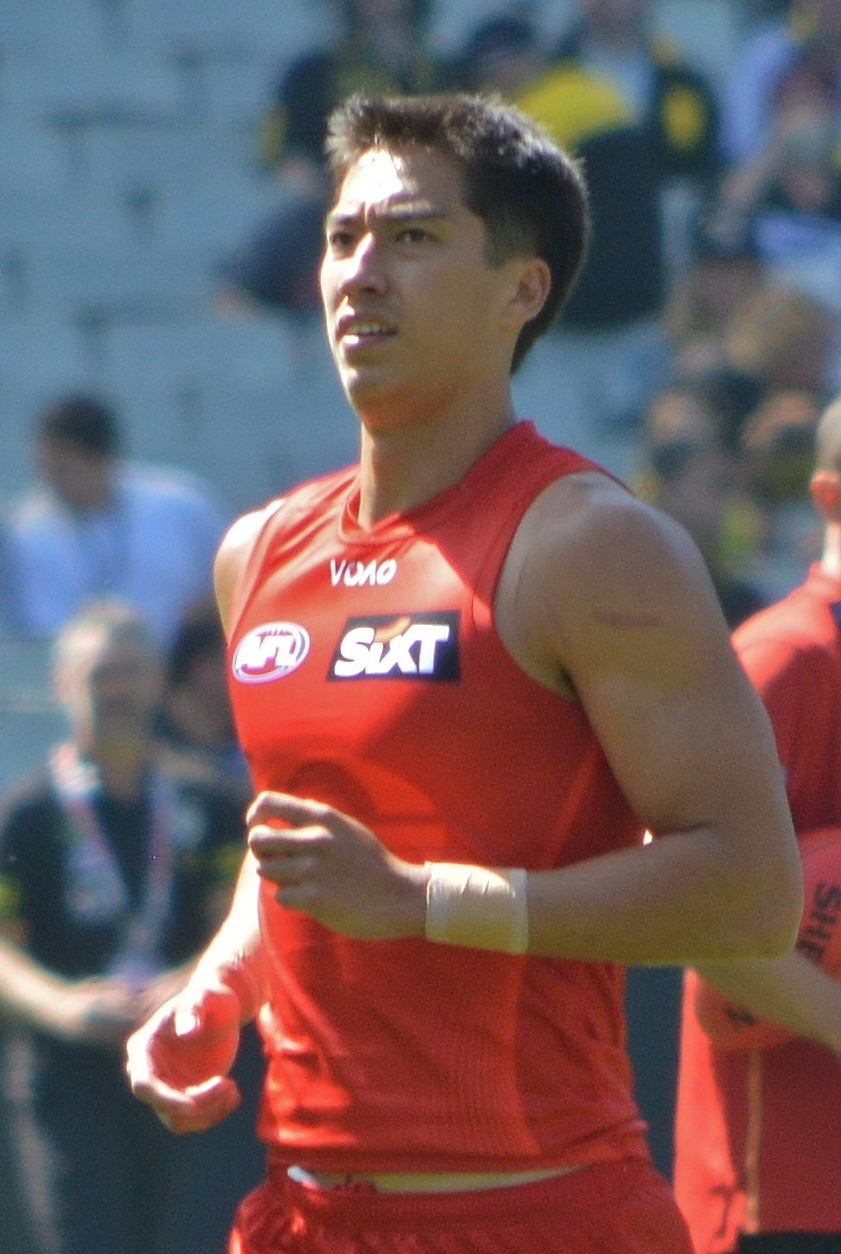
Alex Davies was raised in Cairns

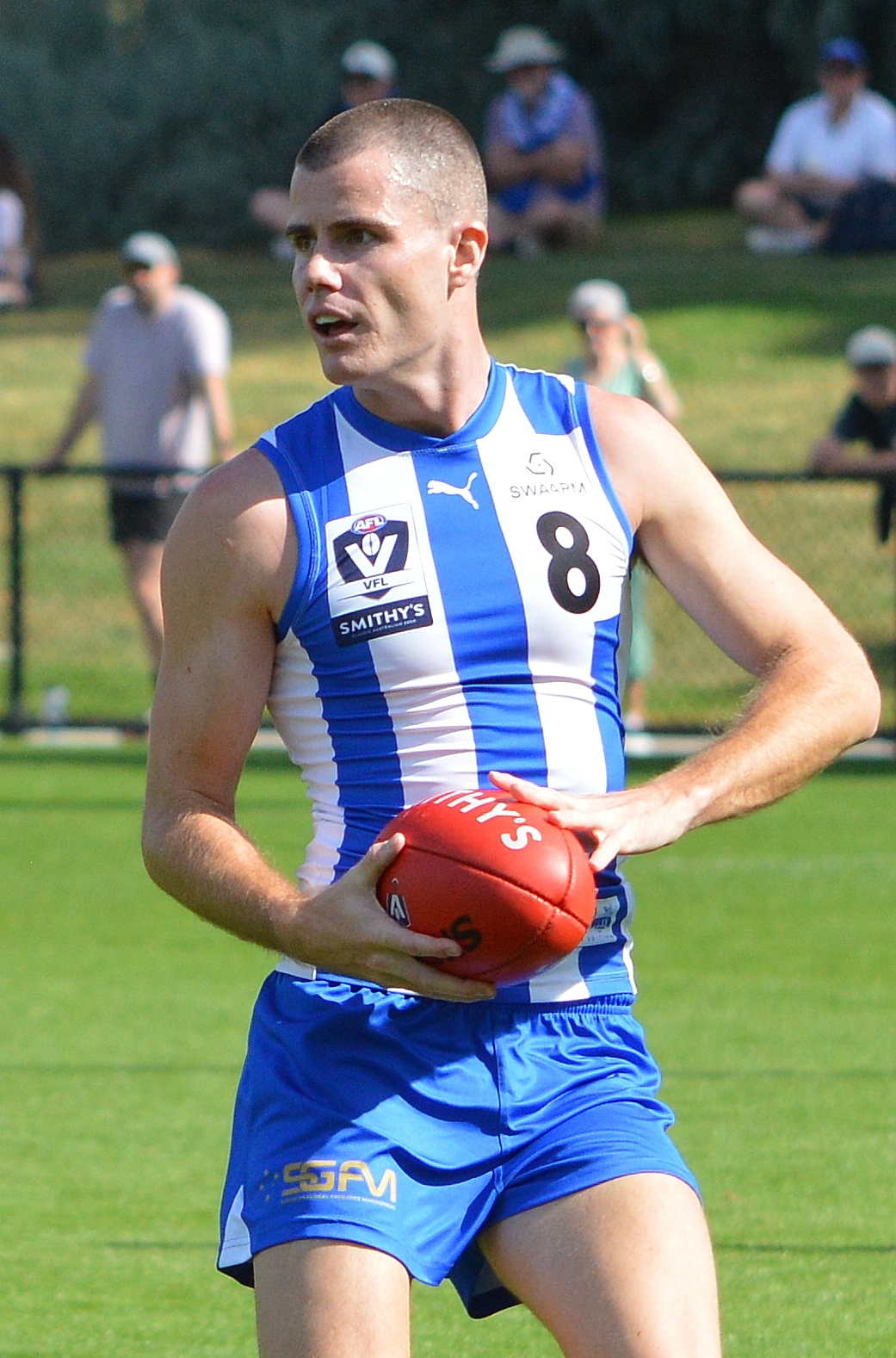
Bailey Scott was raised on the Gold Coast

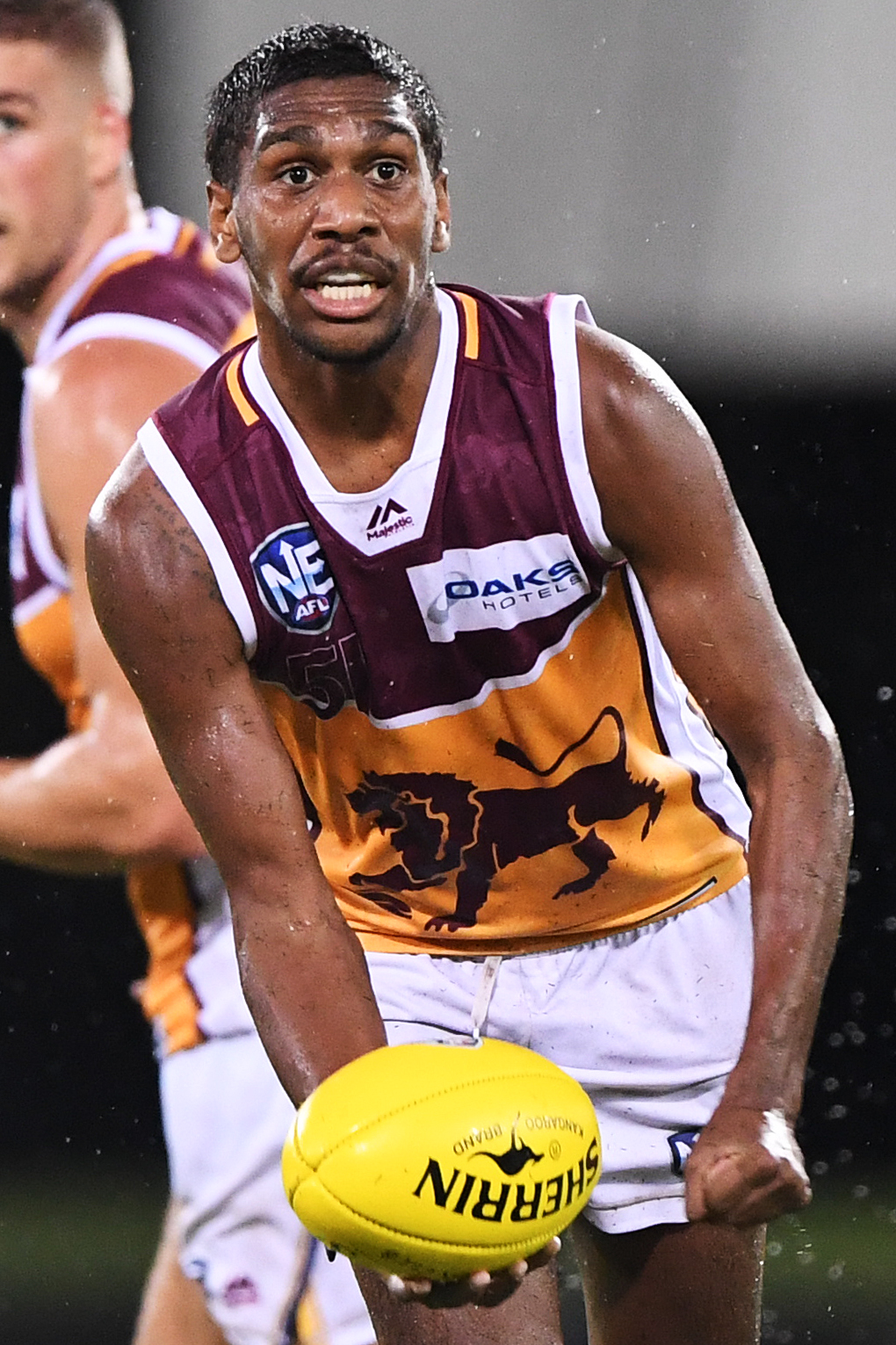
Keidean Coleman was raised in Brisbane

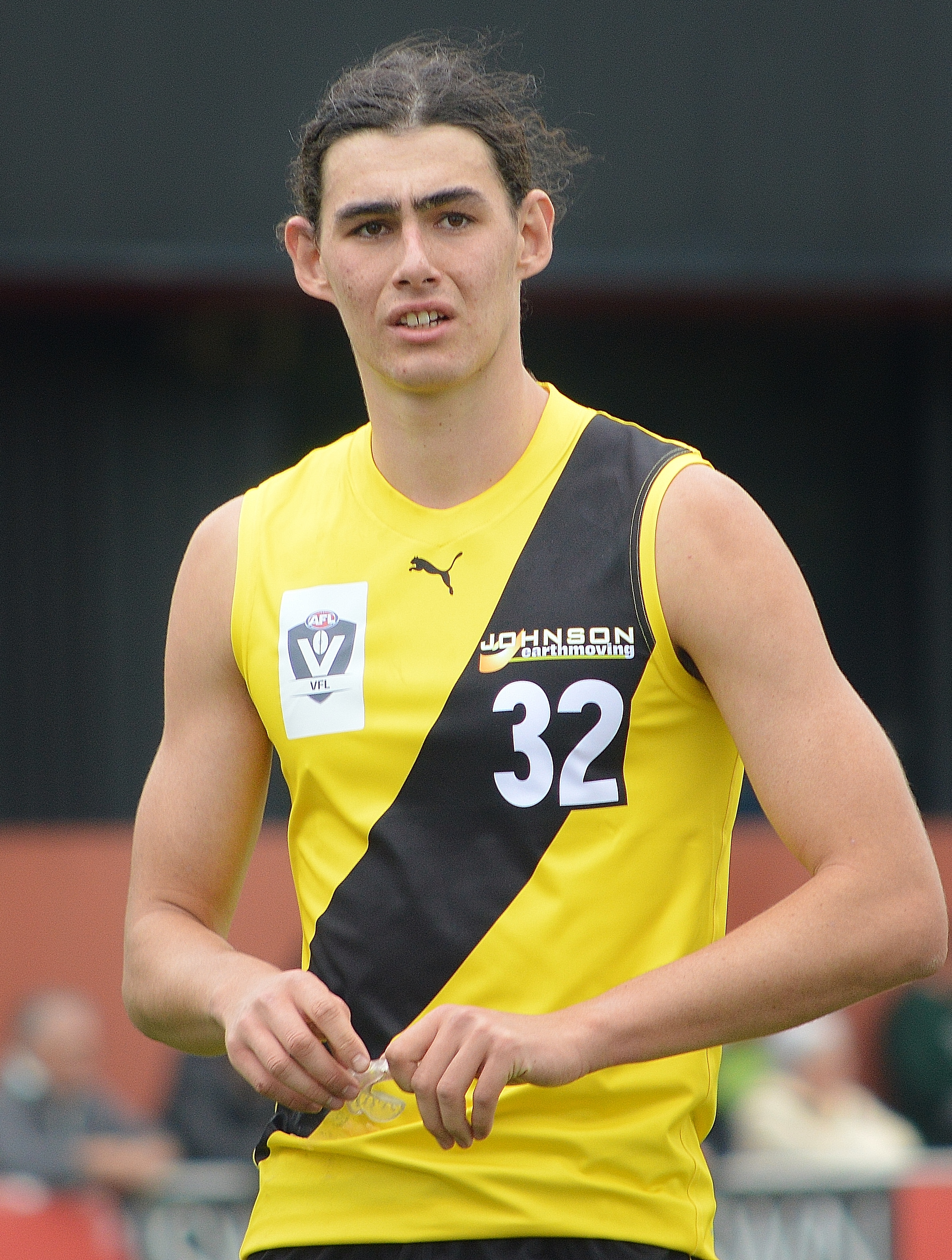
Samson Ryan is from Toowoomba

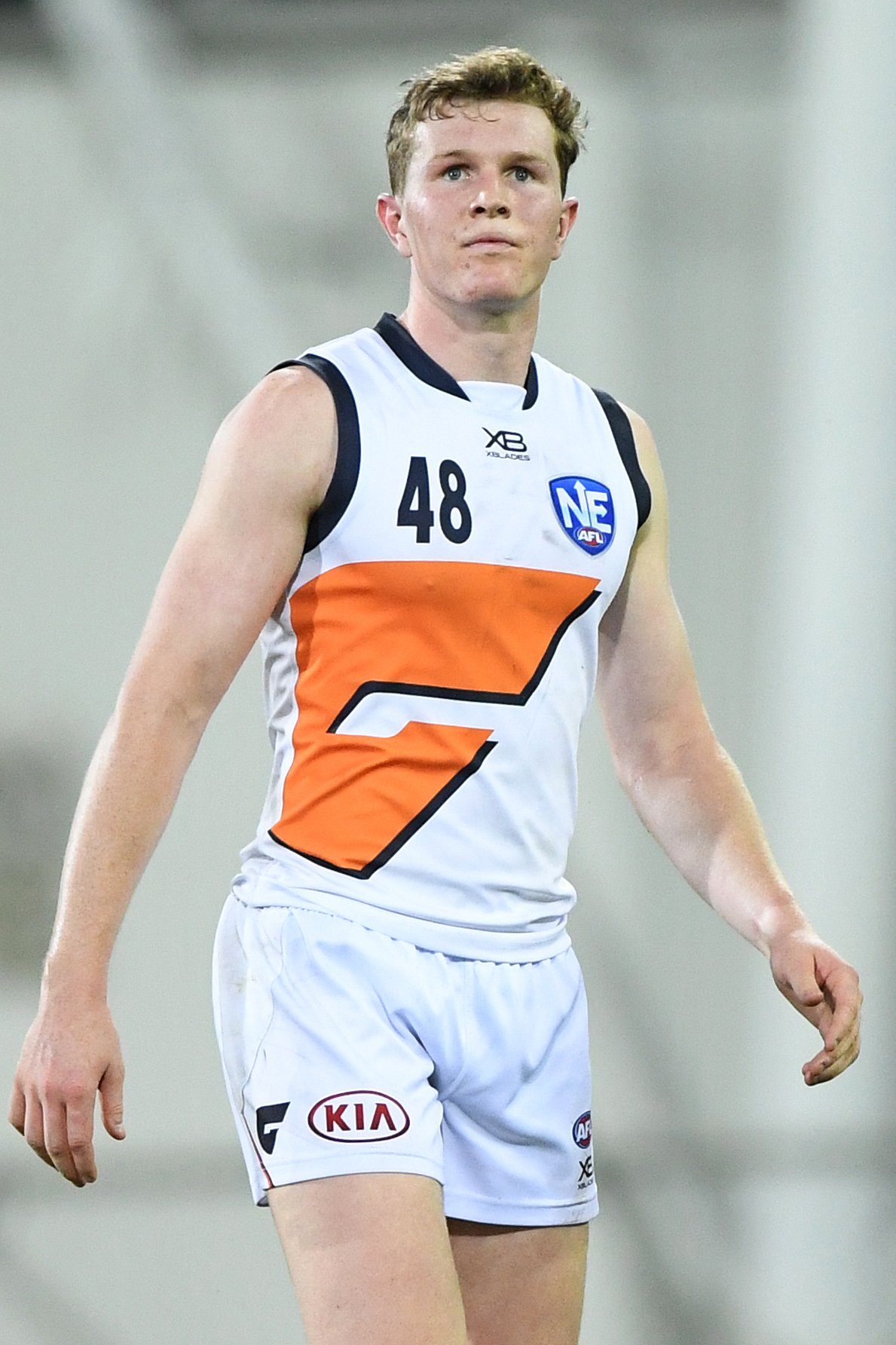
Tom Green is from Townsville

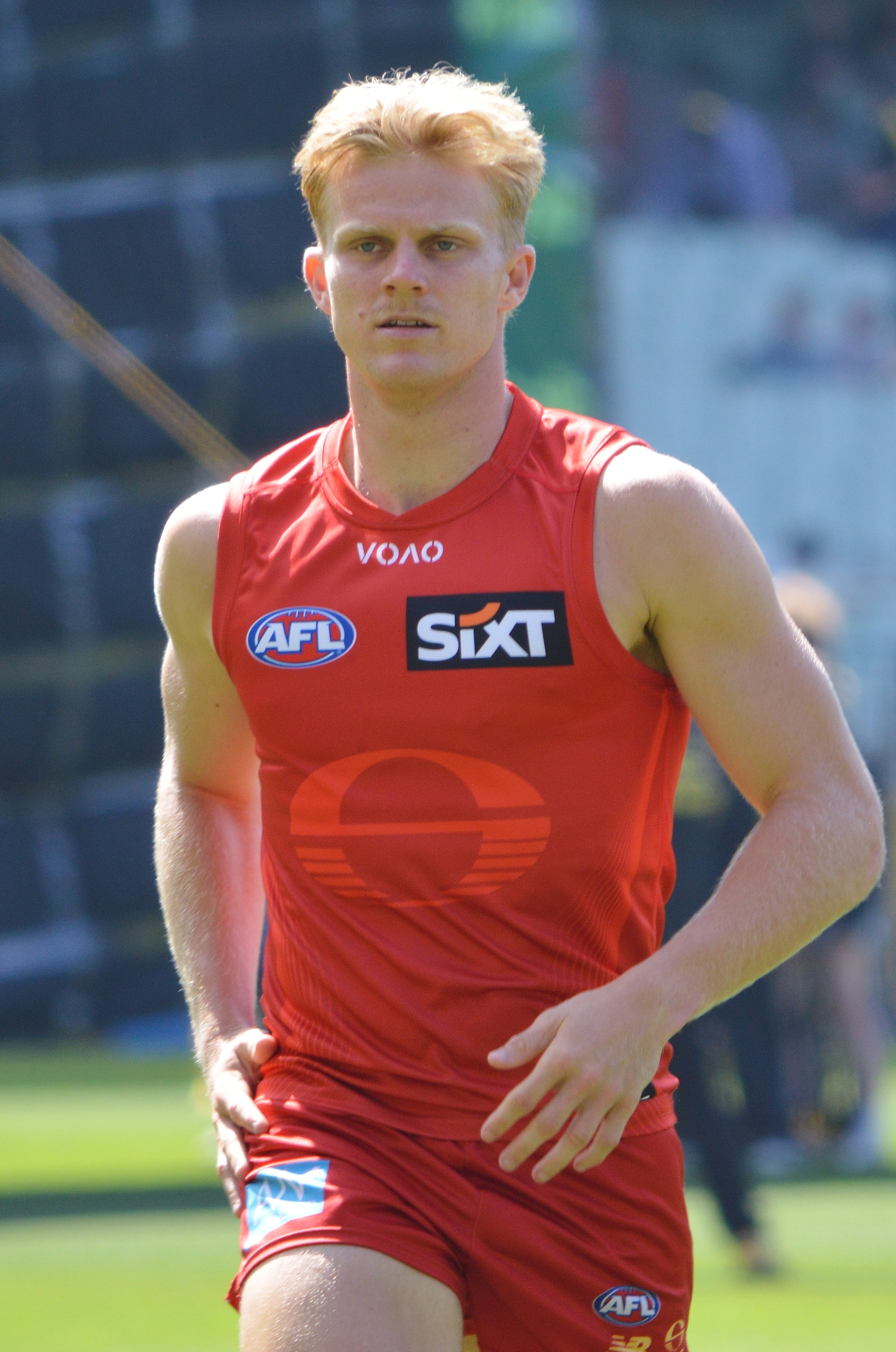
Bodhi Uwland is from the Gold Coast

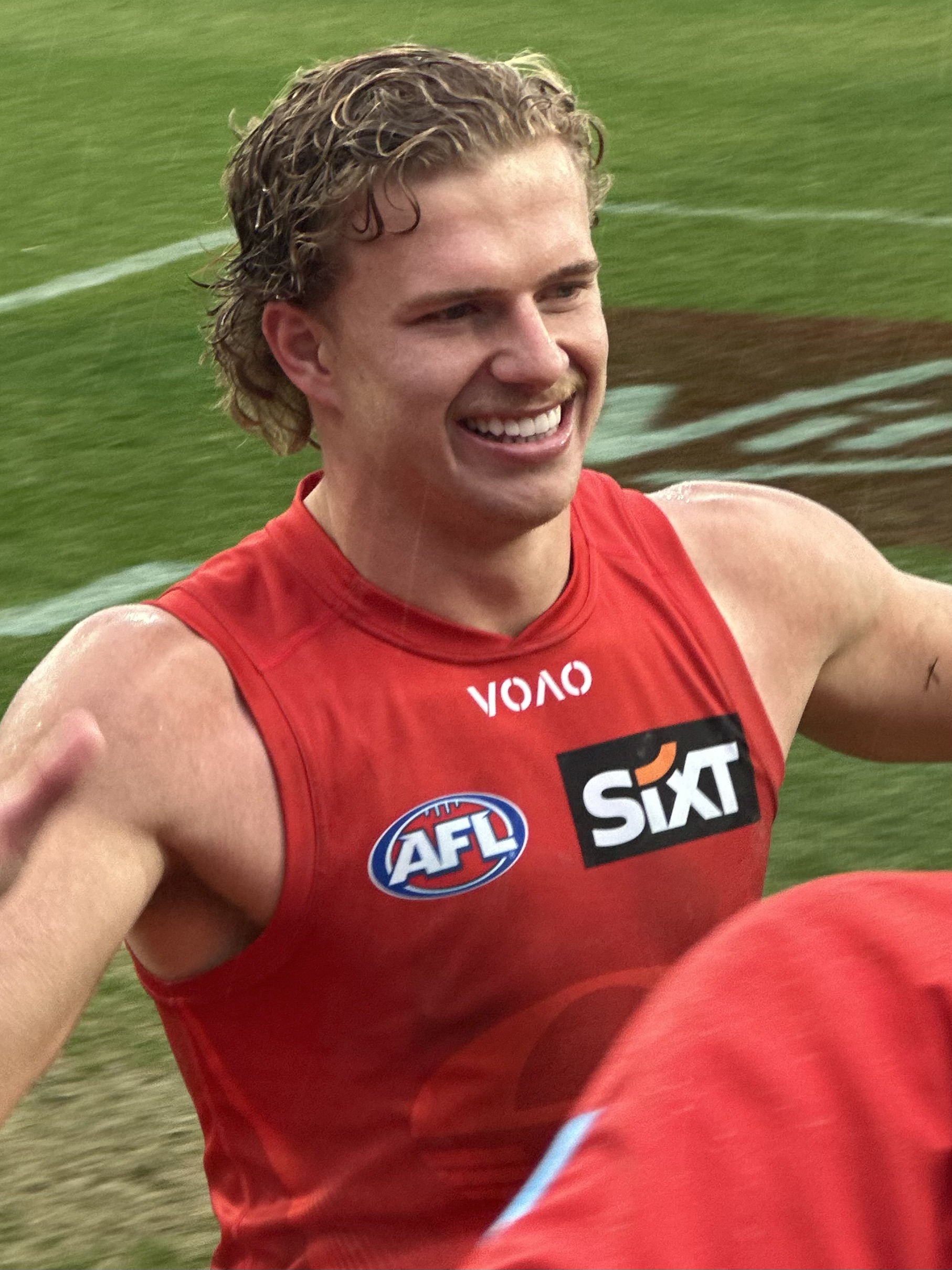
Jed Walter was raised on the Gold Coast

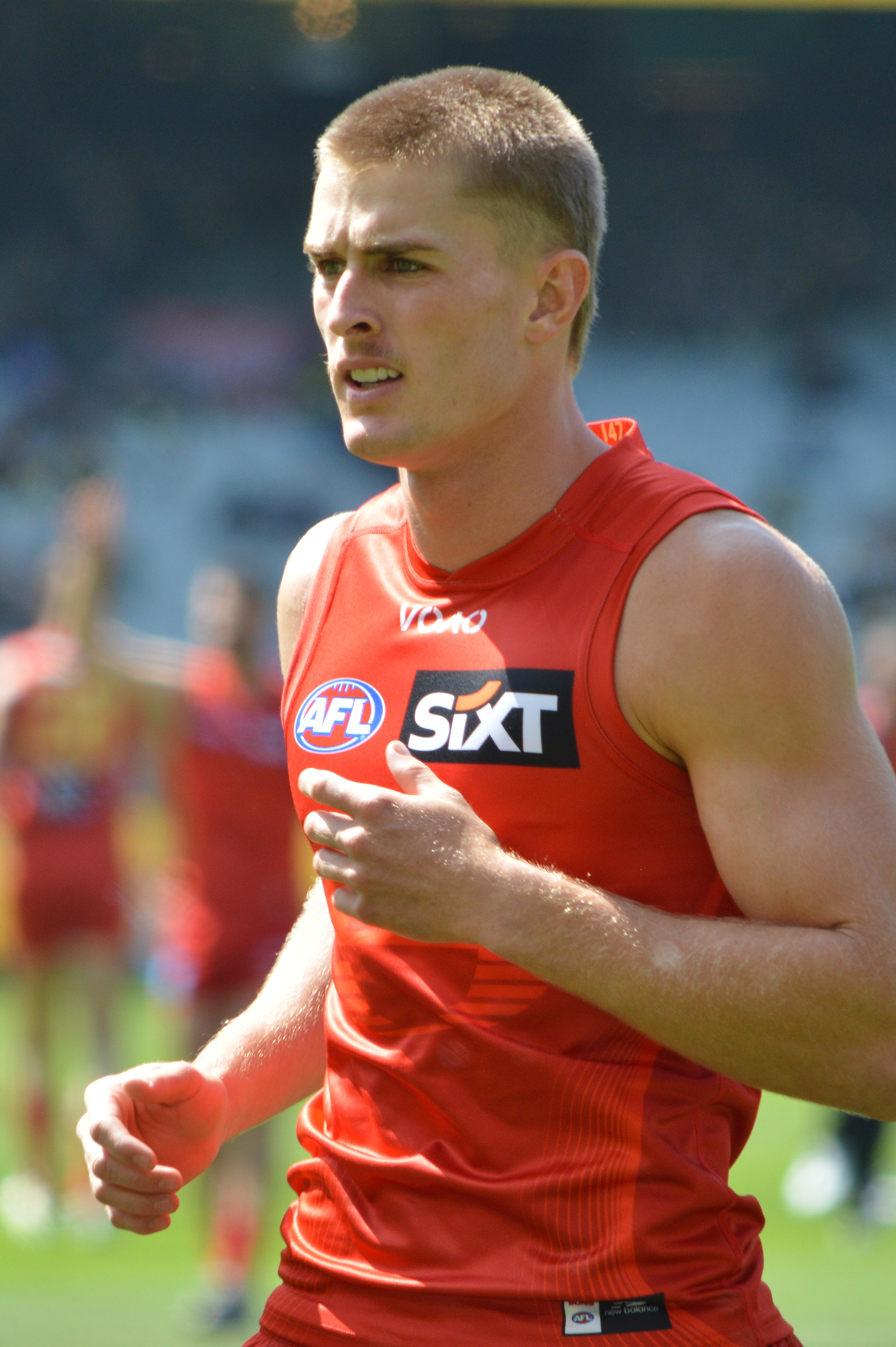
Will Graham is from the Gold Coast

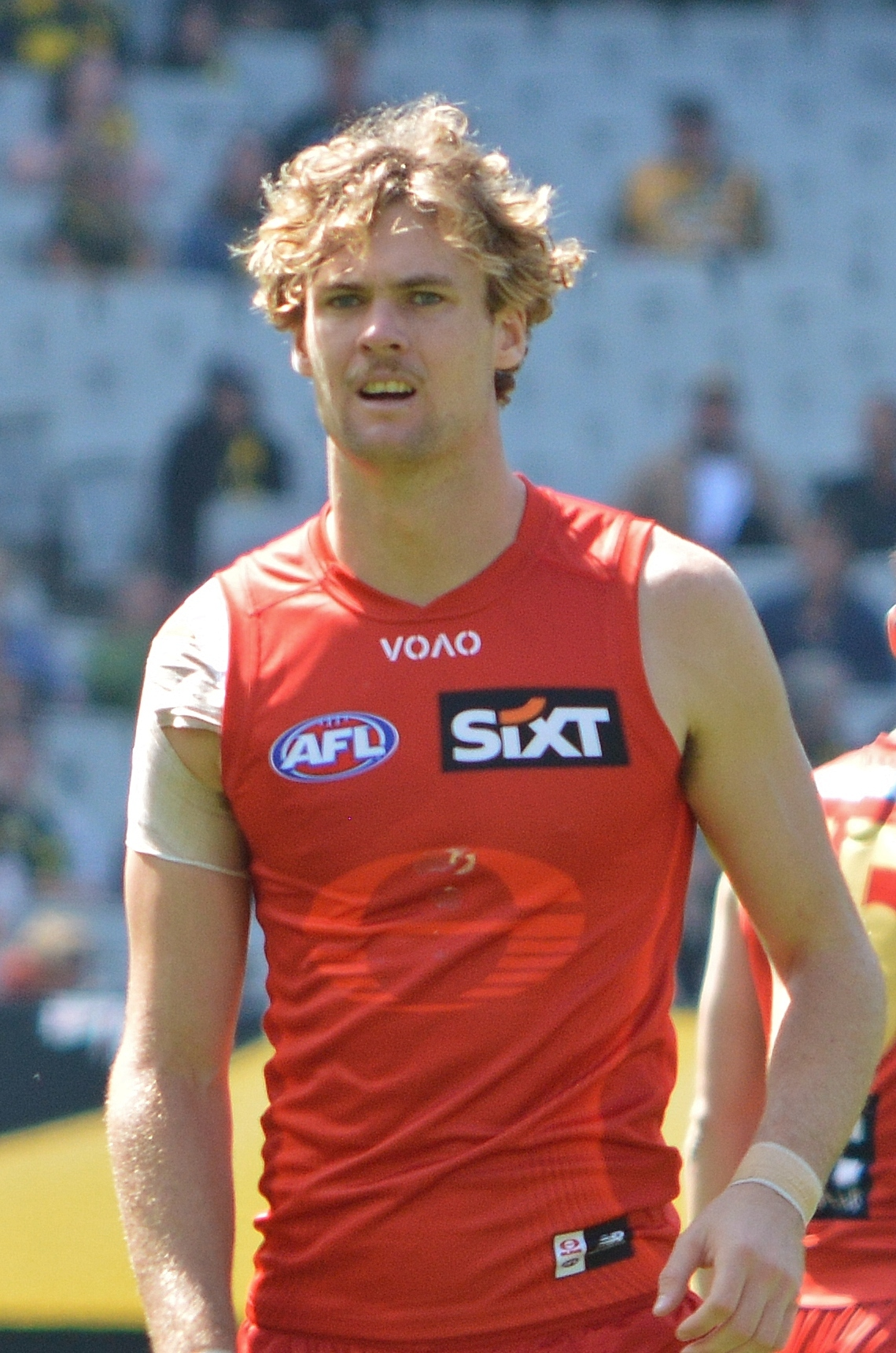
Ethan Read is from the Gold Coast

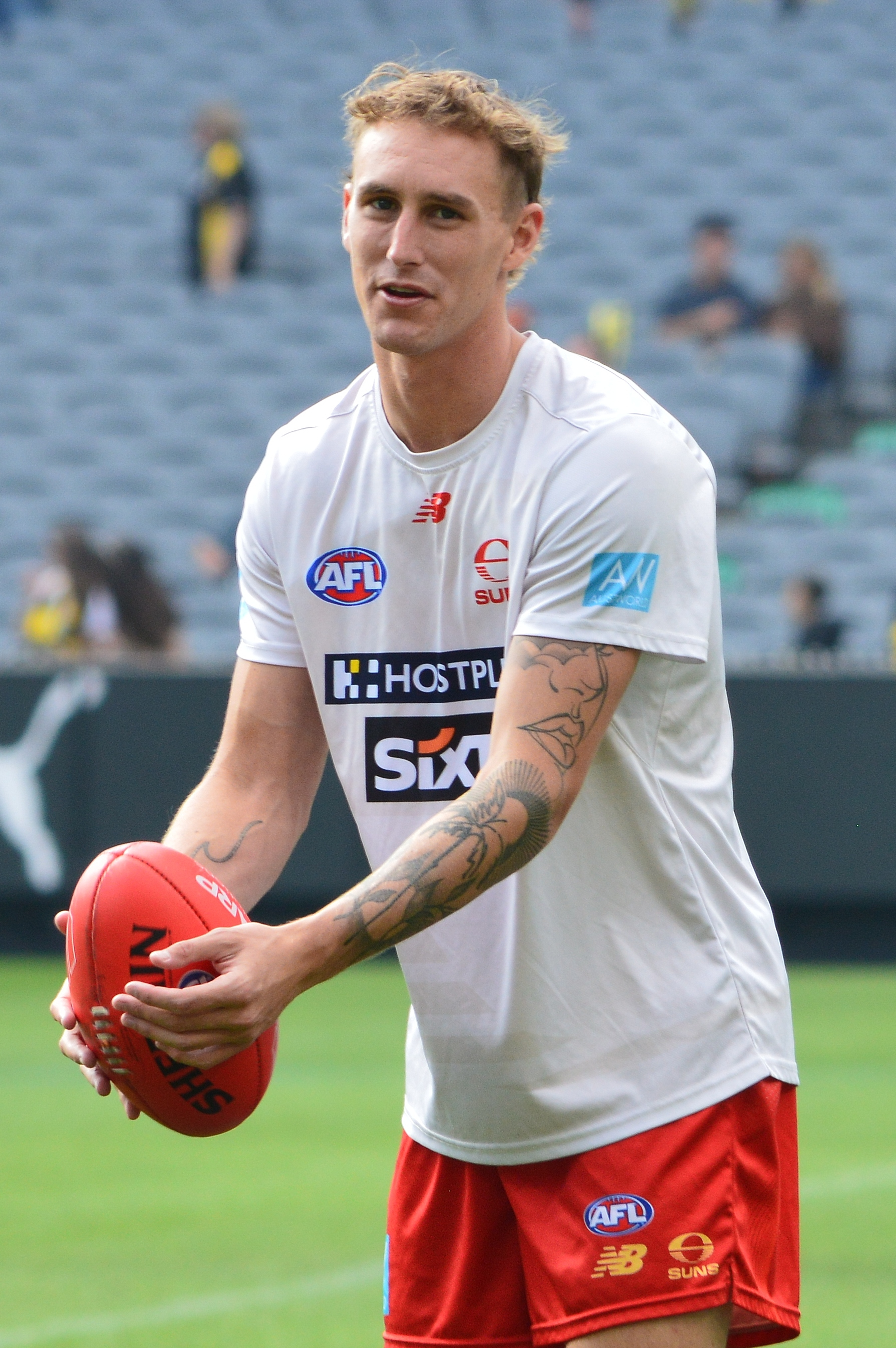
Sam Clohesy was raised on the Gold Coast

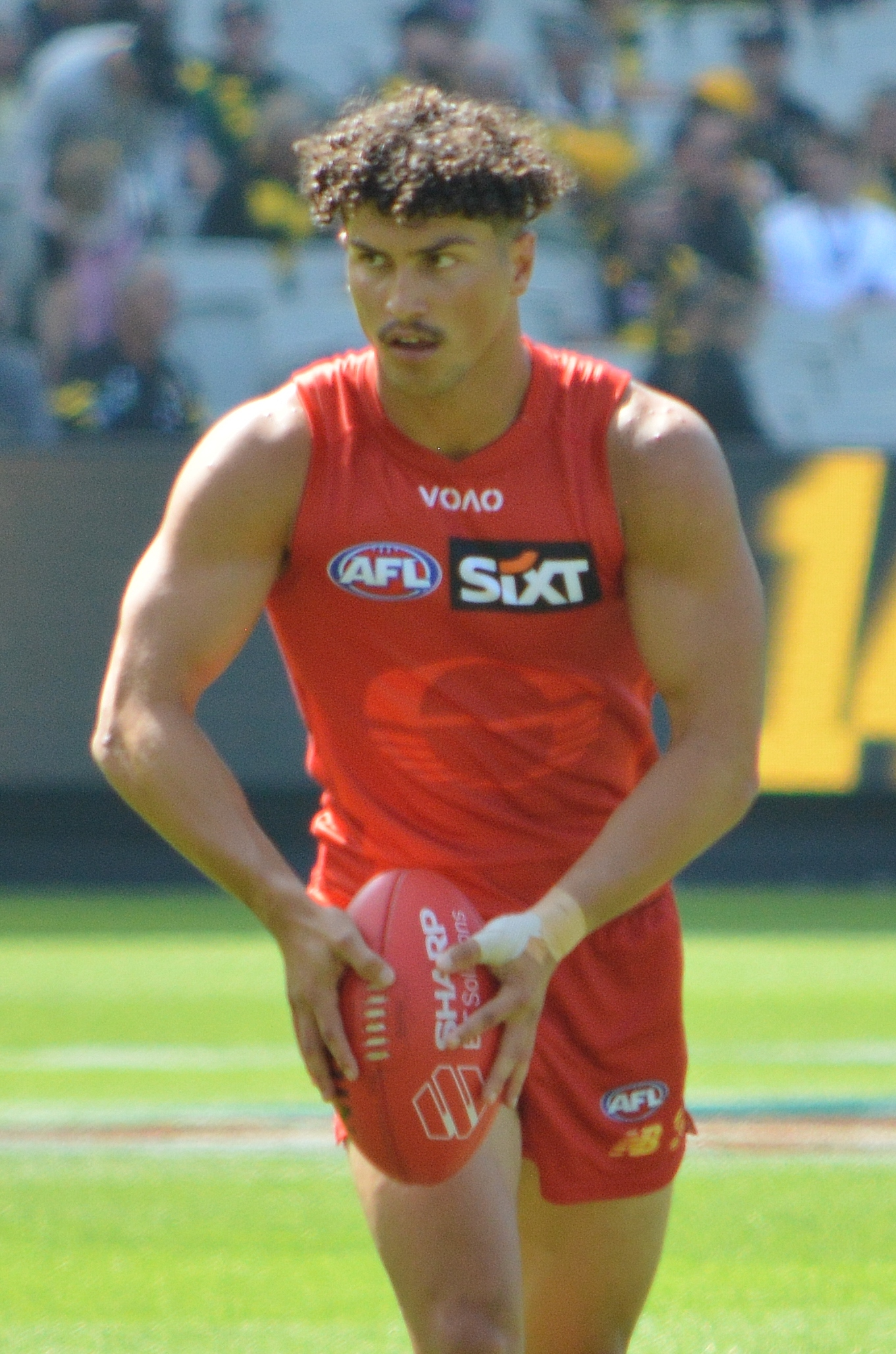
Jake Rogers was raised on the Gold Coast

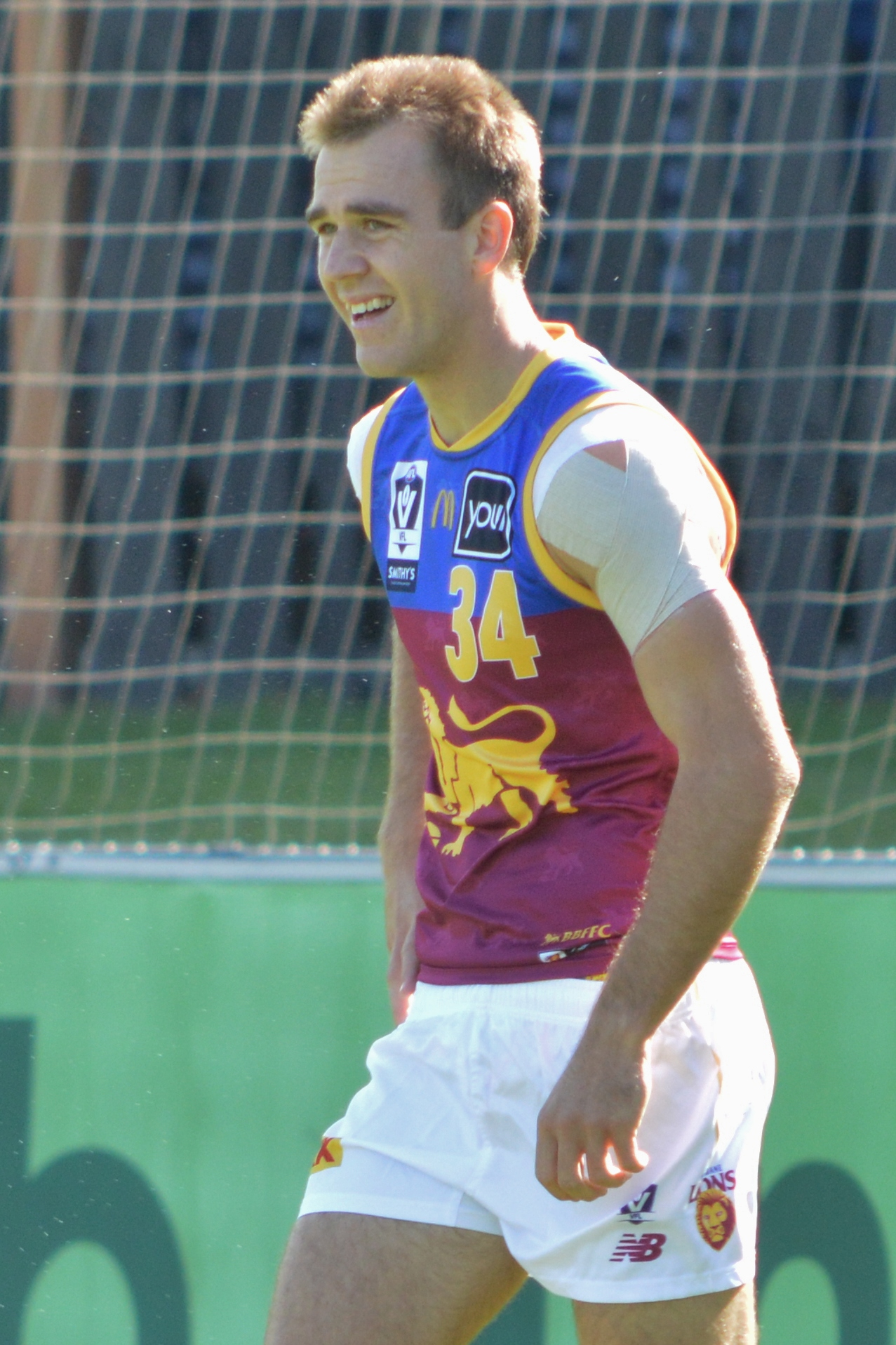
Shadeau Brain is from the Sunshine Coast

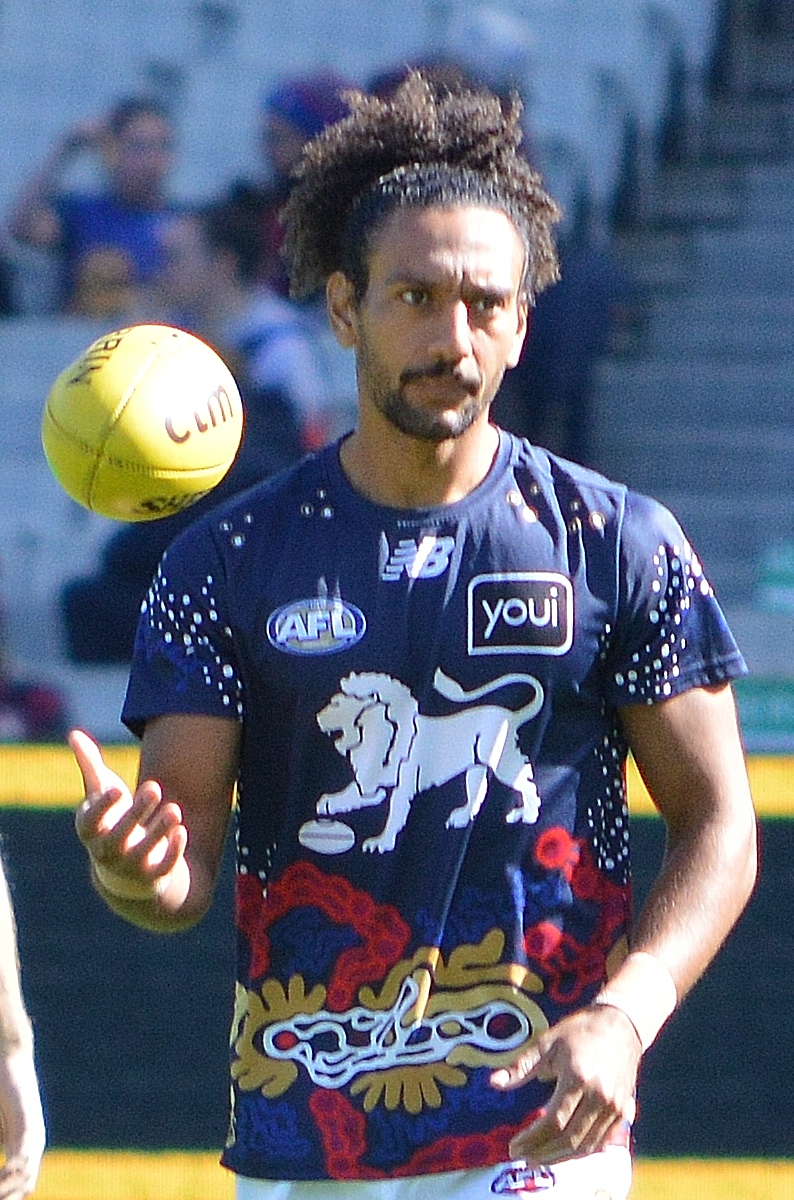
Bruce Reville is from Cairns and Burrum Heads

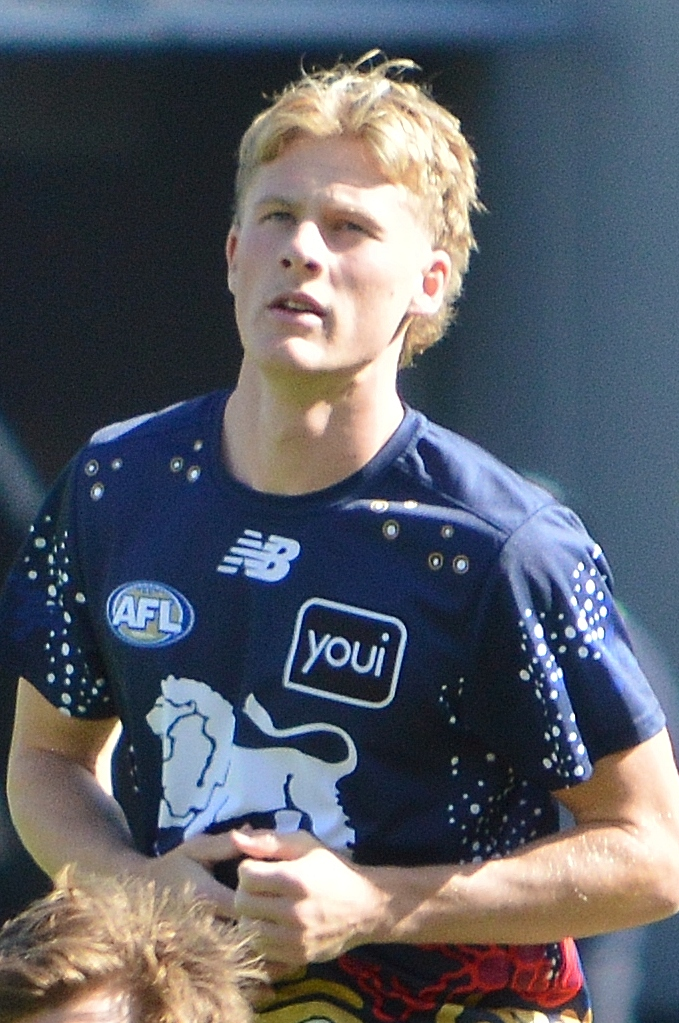
Jaspa Fletcher is from Brisbane

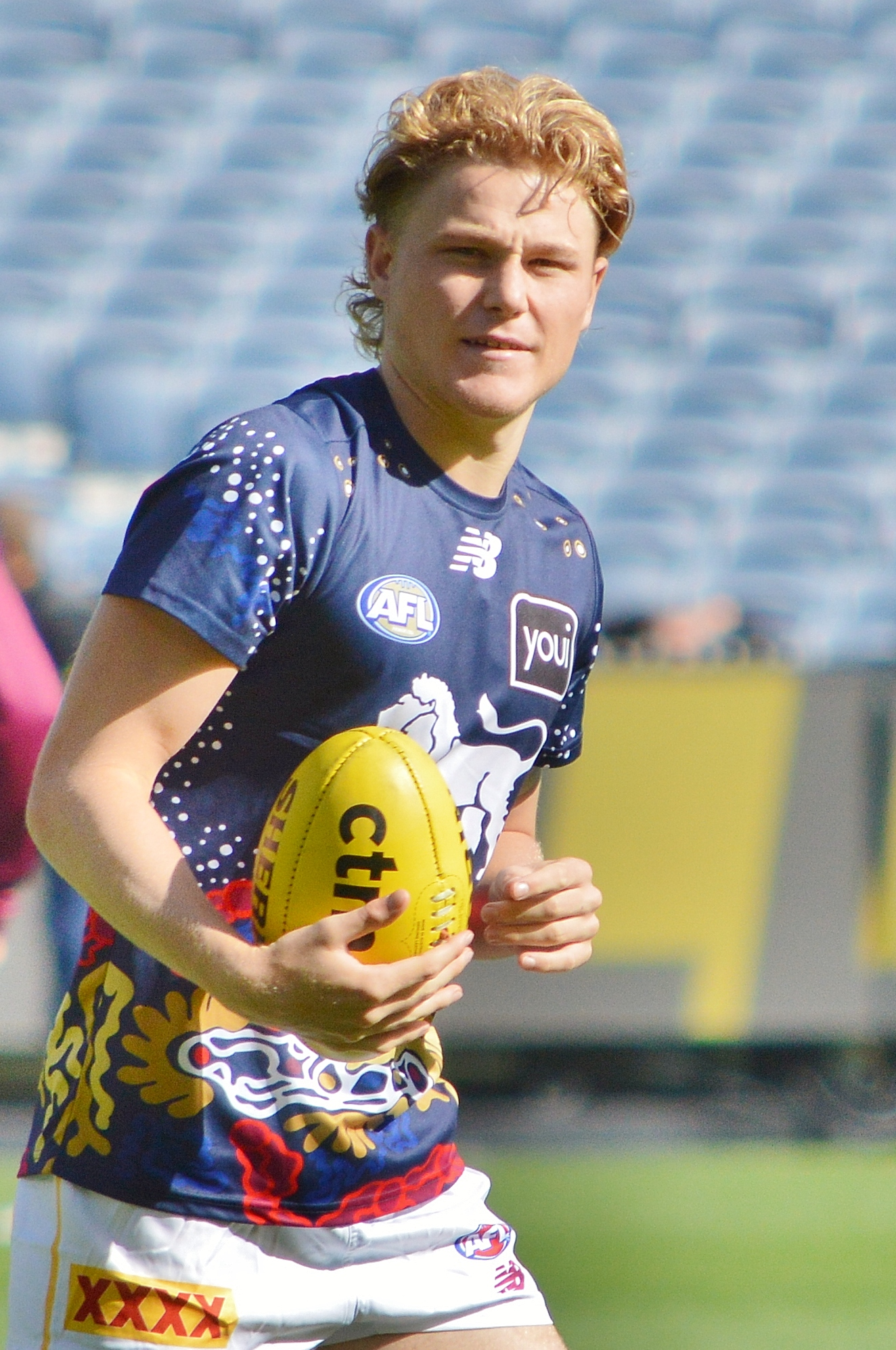
Levi Ashcroft is from the Gold Coast

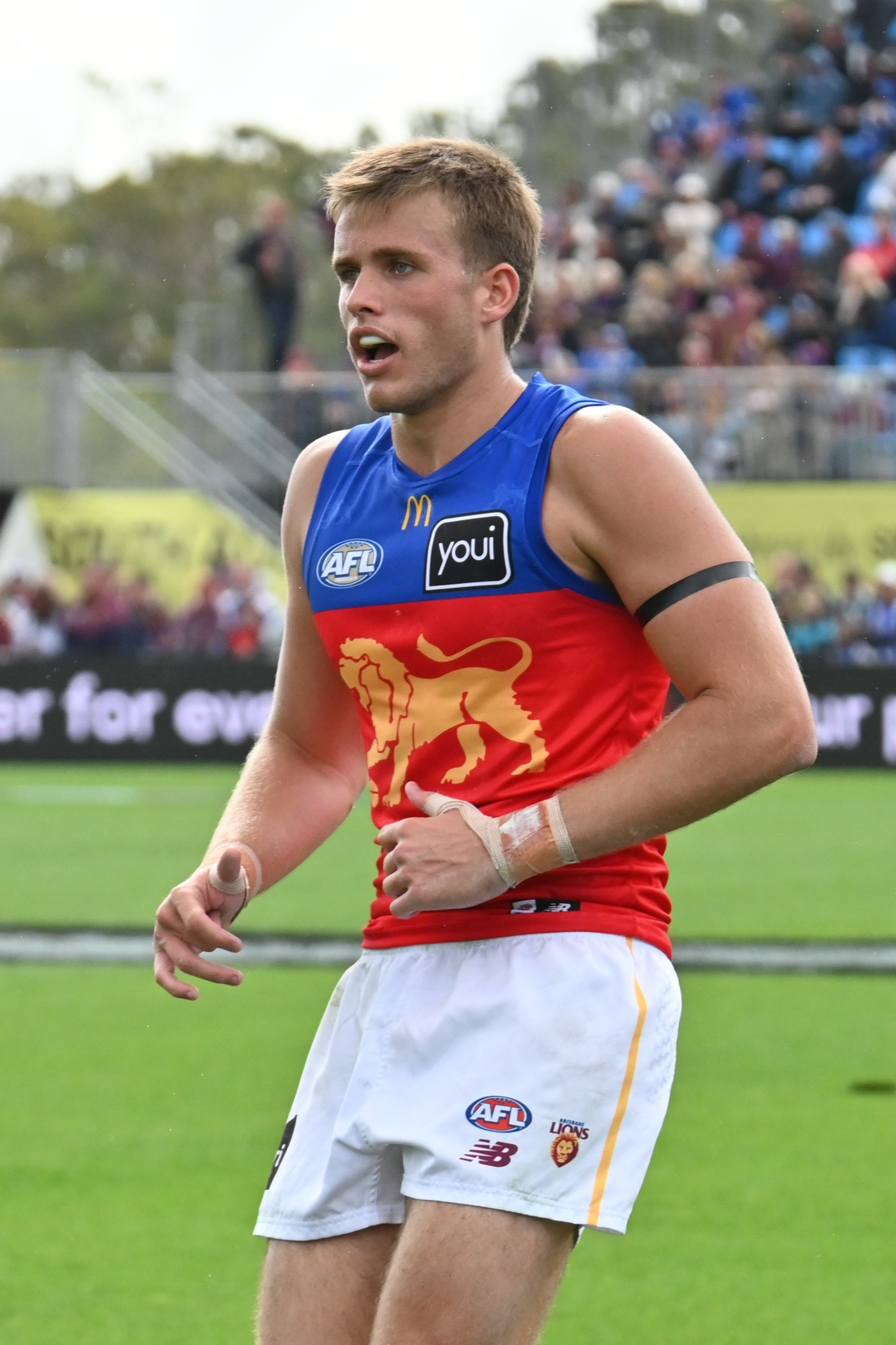
Ty Gallop is from the Sunshine Coast

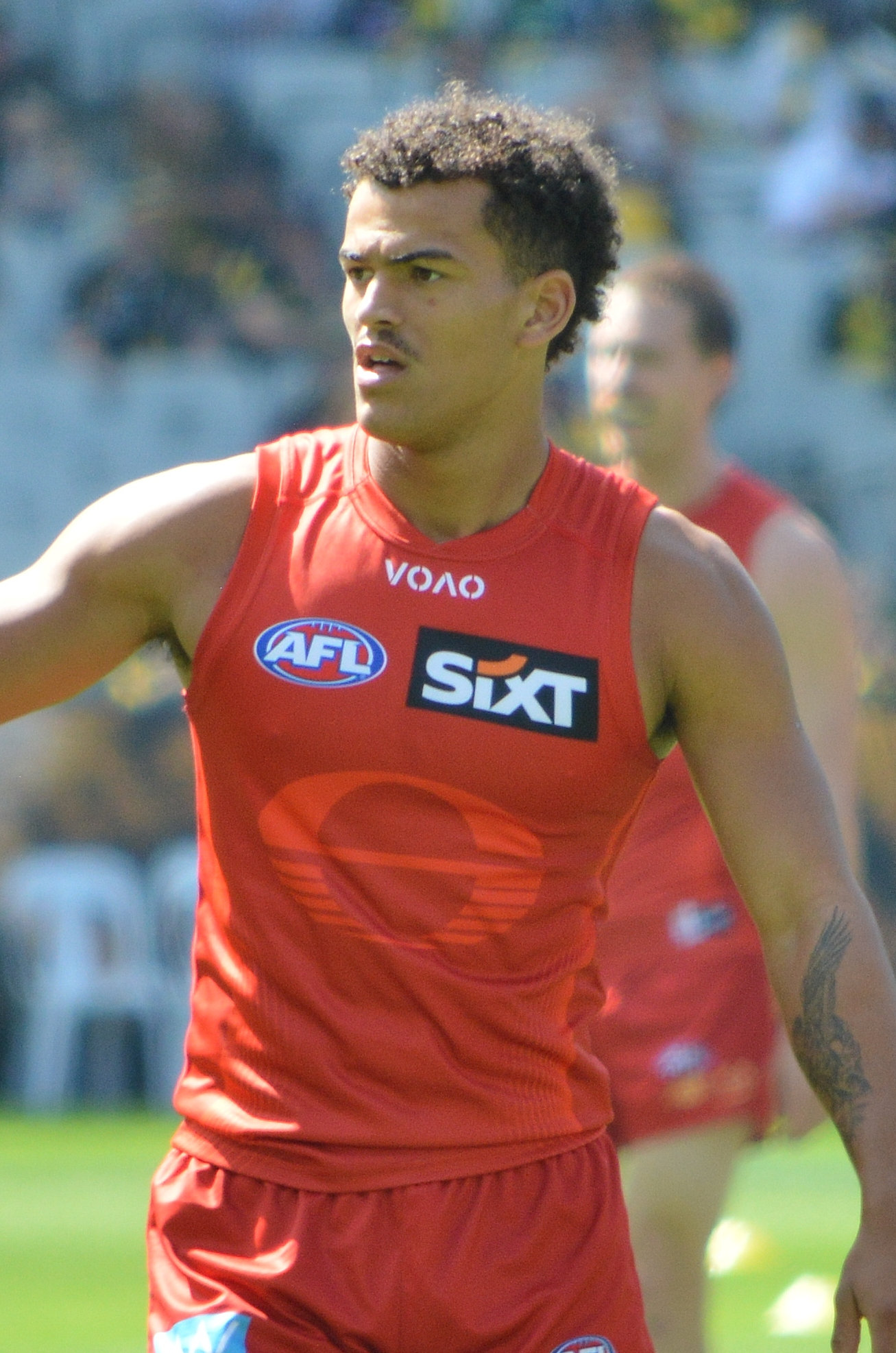
Leo Lombard is from the Gold Coast

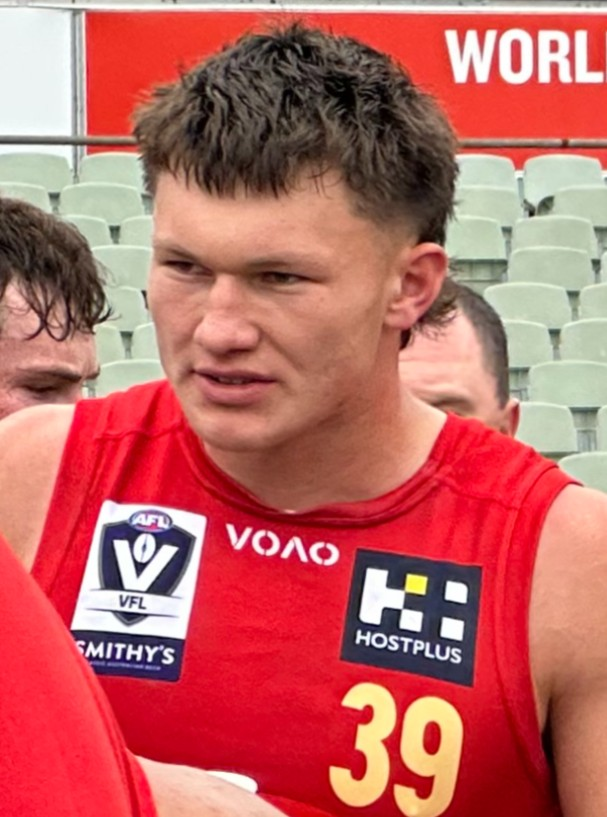
Lachie Gulbin is from the Gold Coast

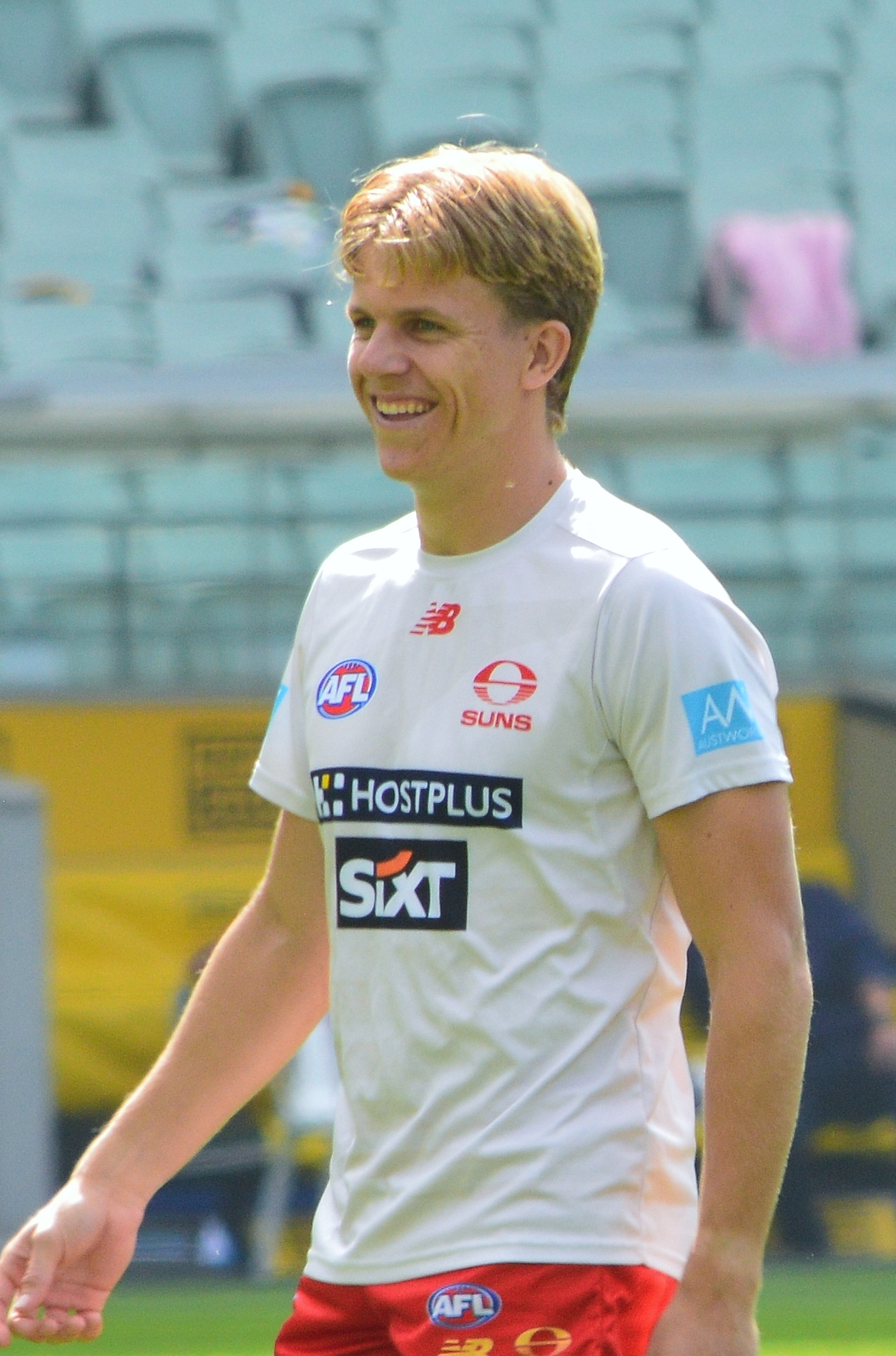
Zeke Uwland is from the Gold Coast

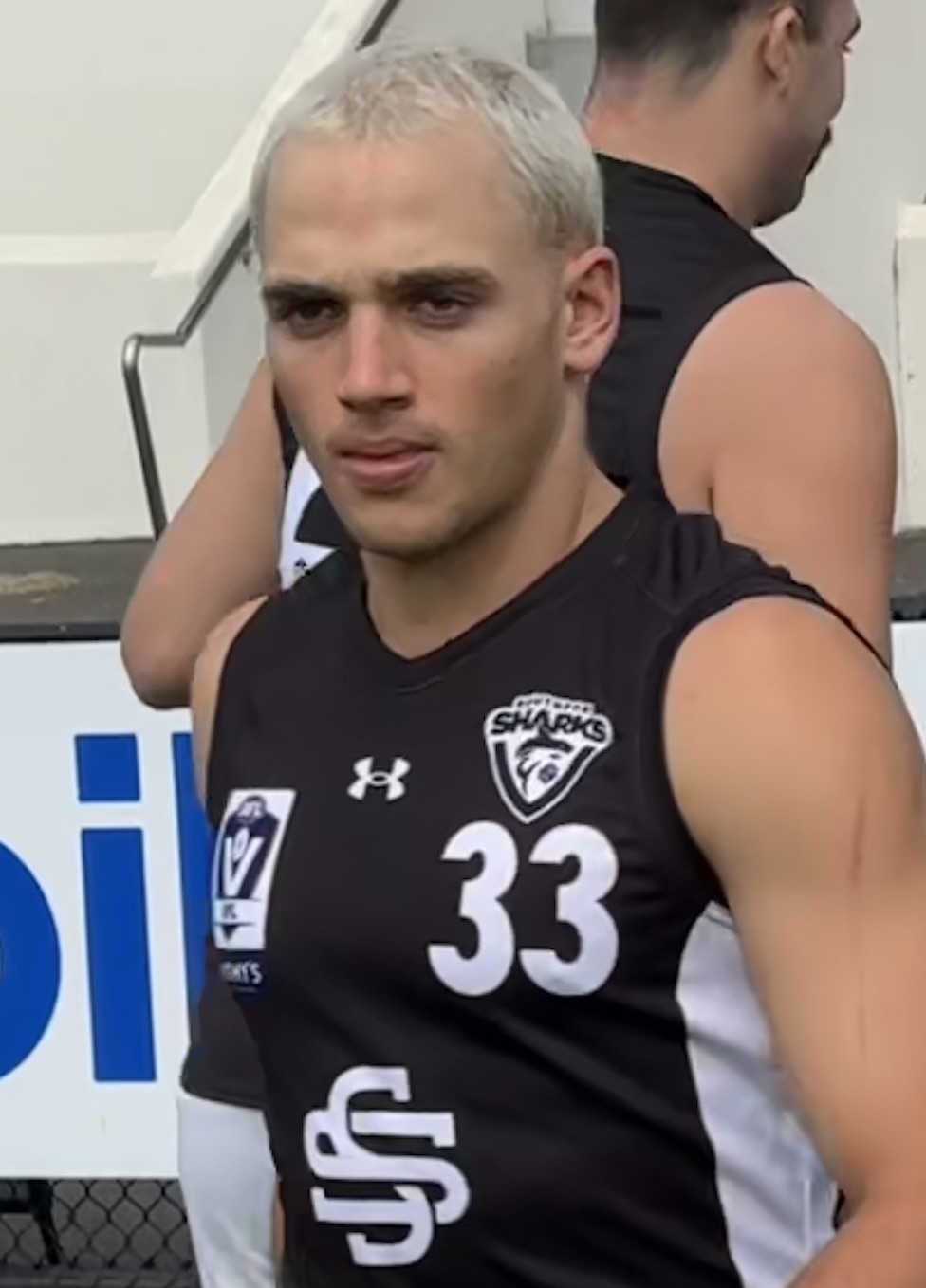
Campbell Lake is from the Gold Coast

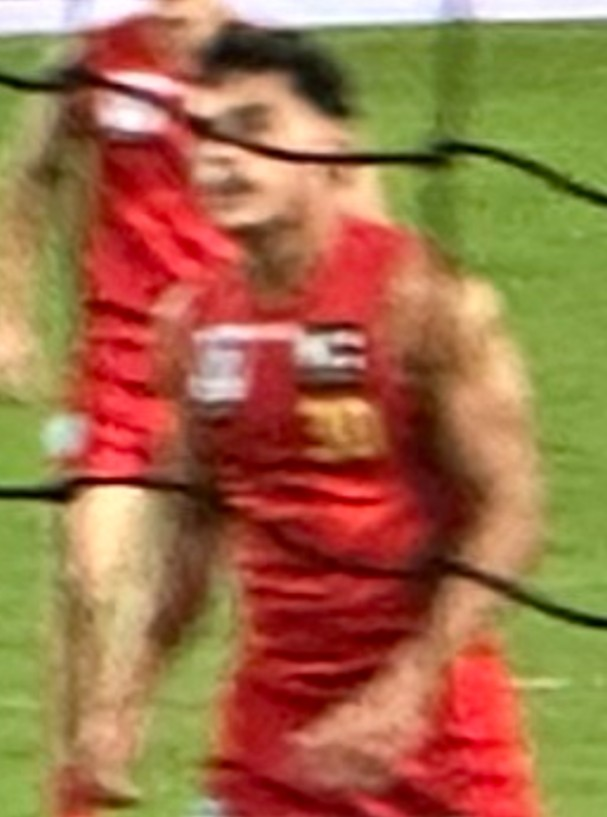
Dylan Patterson is from Gatton

Matt Hill is from Yeppoon

==== AFL players from Queensland ====
Currently on an AFL senior list

Player	QLD junior/senior club/s	Representative honours	AFL Draft	Selection	AFL Years	AFL Games	AFL (Goals)	Connections to Queensland, Notes & References
Matt Hill	Yeppoon Swans, Gold Coast Suns Academy, Gold Coast		2025	(rookie Category B)	2026–	2	2	Raised in Yeppoon
Beau Addinsall	Burleigh Bombers, Gold Coast Suns Academy, Gold Coast	U16 (2023), U17 (2024)	2025	18	2026–	7	2	Born and raised on the Gold Coast
Campbell Lake	Ormeau, Labrador Tigers, Gold Coast Suns Academy, Southport, Gold Coast		2026	(mid season rookie)	2026–	8	5	Raised on the Gold Coast
Jai Murray	Burleigh Bombers, Gold Coast Suns Academy, Gold Coast		2025	17	2026–	9	0	Raised on the Gold Coast
Daniel Annable	Redland, Brisbane Lions Academy, Brisbane Lions	U17 (2025)	2025	6	2026–	3	1	Raised in Ormiston, Redland Bay, Queensland
Dylan Patterson	Palm Beach Currumbin, Gold Coast Suns Academy, Gold Coast		2025	5	2026–	5	3	Born and raised in Gatton
Zeke Uwland	Burleigh Bombers, Gold Coast Suns Academy, Gold Coast	U17 (2024)	2025	2	2026–	17	7	Born and raised on the Gold Coast
Lachie Gulbin	Burleigh Bombers, Broadbeach, Gold Coast Suns Academy, Gold Coast		2024	(Category B rookie)	2025–	10	4	Raised on the Gold Coast
Leo Lombard	Broadbeach, Gold Coast Suns Academy, Burleigh Bombers, Gold Coast	U17 (2023), U18 (2024)	2024	9	2025–	27	19	Born and raised on the Gold Coast
Sam Marshall	Kawana Park, Brisbane Lions Academy, Brisbane Lions	U17 (2023)	2024	25	2025–	13	1	Born and raised in Buderim on the Sunshine Coast
Ty Gallop	Kawana Park, Brisbane Lions Academy, Maroochydore, Brisbane Lions		2024	42	2025–	23	5	Raised on the Sunshine Coast from the age of 9
Levi Ashcroft	Brisbane Lions (VFL), Southport, Broadbeach, Brisbane Lions		2024	5	2025–	49	23	Born and raised on the Gold Coast
Shadeau Brain	Noosa, Brisbane Lions Academy, Brisbane Lions		2023 (rookie)		2024–	11	0	Raised on and recruited from the Sunshine Coast
Bruce Reville	Western Magpies, Maryborough Bears, Brisbane Lions Academy, Brisbane Lions		2023 (rookie)		2024–	43	12	Raised in Cairns, Brisbane and Maryborough from the age of 7
Jake Rogers	Broadbeach, Gold Coast Suns Academy, Gold Coast		2022	14	2024–	25	10	Raised on the Gold Coast from the age of 5
Sam Clohesy	Coolangatta Tweed Heads, Gold Coast Suns Academy, Gold Coast		2024 (rookie)		2024–	44	12	Raised on the Gold Coast from the age of 14
Ethan Read	Palm Beach Currumbin, Gold Coast Suns Academy, Gold Coast		2023	9	2024–	38	34	Born and raised on the Gold Coast
Will Graham	Palm Beach Currumbin, Palm Beach Currumbin State High School, Gold Coast Suns Academy, Gold Coast	U17	2023	26	2024–	37	23	Born and raised on the Gold Coast
Jed Walter	Palm Beach Currumbin, Palm Beach Currumbin State High School, Gold Coast Suns Academy, Gold Coast	U17	2023	3	2024–	48	62	Raised on the Gold Coast from the age of 9
Bodhi Uwland	Burleigh Bombers, Broadbeach, Gold Coast Suns Academy, Gold Coast		2022	37	2023–	72	2	Born and raised on the Gold Coast
Will Ashcroft	Gold Coast Suns Academy, Southport, Broadbeach, Morningside, Brisbane Lions	U15 (2018)	2022	2	2023–	80	41	Born and raised on the Gold Coast
Jaspa Fletcher	Coorparoo, Sherwood Magpies, Brisbane Lions Academy, Brisbane Lions	U19 (2021)	2022	12	2023–	89	23	Raised in Brisbane from age 3
Noah Cumberland	Mountain Creek SS, Mountain Creek SHS, Brisbane Lions Academy, Maroochydore		2019	43	2022–	25	33	Raised on Sunshine Coast
Carter Michael	Maroochydore, Brisbane Lions Academy, Brisbane Lions	U17 (2019)	2020	(rookie Category B)	2022–2024	1	1	Raised on Sunshine Coast
Hewago Oea	Gold Coast Suns Academy, Broadbeach, Gold Coast	U16 (2016, 2017)	2020	(international rookie)	2022–2024	31	17	Raised on Gold Coast from the age of 16
Samson Ryan	Sherwood Districts, Redland, Brisbane Lions Academy	U17 (2018)	2020	40	2021–	19	14	Raised in Toowoomba and Brisbane from the age of 16
Tom Green			2019	10	2020–	115	49	Born in Townsville, raised in Townsville and Toowoomba
Connor Budarick	Labrador Tigers, Gold Coast Suns Academy, Southport, Gold Coast	U16 (2017)	2019 Rookie	(rookie)	2020–	68	8	Raised on the Gold Coast from the age of 9
Keidean Coleman	Brisbane Lions Academy, Wynnum, Morningside, Brisbane Lions				2020–	65	14	Raised in Brisbane from the age of 9
Will Martyn	Brisbane Lions Academy, Aspley	U15 (2016), U17 (2018)			2020–2022	3	0	Raised in Brisbane
Alex Davies	Manunda Hawks, Gold Coast Suns Academy, Gold Coast	U16 (2018)	2020	(Pre-draft)	2020–	28	9	Raised in Cairns
Bailey Scott	Broadbeach, Gold Coast Suns Academy	U16 (2016)	2018	49	2019–	116	35	Raised on the Gold Coast
Caleb Graham	Cairns Saints, Gold Coast Suns Academy, Gold Coast	U16 (2016), U17 (2017)	2018	71	2019–	37	1	Born and raised in Cairns
Tom Fullarton	Brisbane Lions Academy, Brisbane Lions	U16 (2015)			2019–2025	21	6	Born and raised on Sunshine Coast
Jarrod Cameron	–				2019–2021	12	13	Born and raised on Mornington Island (Lardil and Waanyi)
Elliott Himmelberg	Redland, Brisbane Lions Academy	U18 (2016)	2016	51	2018–	50	49	Raised in Brisbane
Oskar Baker	Aspley	QLD (2017)	2017	48	2018–	57	23	Born in Queensland, raised in Brisbane
Jack Payne	Noosa, Brisbane Lions Academy, Brisbane Lions	U16 (2015)	2015	54	2018–	81	2	Raised on the Sunshine Coast
Jacob Heron	Cairns Saints, Gold Coast Suns Academy, Gold Coast	U16 (2015)			2018–2020	13	2	Born and raised in Cairns
Brayden Crossley	Palm Beach Currumbin, Gold Coast Suns Academy, Gold Coast	U16 (2015), U18 (2016)			2018–2019	10	5	Born and raised on Gold Coast
Connor Ballenden	Kenmore, Brisbane Lions Academy, Brisbane Lions	U16 (2015), U18 (2016)			2018–	2	0	Raised in Brisbane
Jacob Dawson	Palm Beach Currumbin, Gold Coast Suns Academy, Gold Coast				2018–2019	9	1	Raised on the Gold Coast
Jack Bowes	Manunda Hawks, Cairns Saints, Gold Coast Suns Academy, Surfers Paradise, Gold Coast	U18 (2016 c)	2016	10	2017–	152	53	Born and raised in Cairns.
Brad Scheer	Palm Beach Currumbin, Gold Coast Suns Academy, Gold Coast	U18 (2016)			2017–2019	13	2	Raised on the Gold Coast
Jacob Allison	Aspley, Brisbane Lions Academy, Brisbane Lions	U18 (2016)			2017	10	2	Raised in Brisbane
Wylie Buzza	Lockyer Valley Demons, Brisbane Lions Academy, Mount Gravatt				2017	9	6	Raised in Gatton, Queensland
Max Spencer	Palm Beach Currumbin, Gold Coast Suns Academy, Gold Coast				2017	8	0	Born and raised on the Gold Coast
Josh Williams	Hermit Park Tigers, Gold Coast Suns Academy				2017	2	1	Raised in Townsville
Eric Hipwood	Kawana Park, Caloundra, Aspley, Brisbane Lions Academy, Brisbane Lions reserves, Brisbane Lions	U18 (2015)	2015	14	2016–	211	304	Raised on Sunshine Coast from the age of 3
Mabior Chol	Yeronga SHS, Yeronga, Brisbane Lions Academy, Brisbane Lions reserves, Aspley, Gold Coast		2016 (rookie)	(Rookie 30)	2016–	128	188	Raised in Brisbane (Acacia Ridge)
Jesse Joyce	Palm Beach Currumbin, Gold Coast Suns Academy, Gold Coast				2016–	64	2	Raised on the Gold Coast
Ben Keays	Brisbane Lions Academy, Morningside, Redland, Brisbane Lions	U18 (2014, 2015 c)	2015	24	2016–	185	72	Raised and schooled in Brisbane
Josh Wagner	Aspley, Brisbane Lions	U18 (2011, 2012)			2016–2020	40	2	Raised in Brisbane
Corey Wagner	Aspley				2016–2020, 2023–	73	9	Raised in Brisbane
Josh Smith	Redland	U18 (2011)			2016–2019	34	7	Raised in Brisbane
Reuben William	Zillmere, Brisbane Lions				2016–2017	3	0	Raised in Brisbane
Harris Andrews	Aspley, Brisbane Lions Academy, Brisbane Lions	U18 (2014)	2014	61	2015–	257	11	Raised in Brisbane from age of 4, attended Padua College
Caleb Daniel	–		2014	46	2015–	234	49	Born and raised in Beaudesert.
Lachie Weller	Broadbeach, Gold Coast Suns Academy, Gold Coast	U18 (2014 c)	2014	13	2015–	172	55	Raised on Gold Coast
Braydon Preuss	Hermit Park Tigers, Surfers Paradise				2015–	28	11	Born and raised in Townsville
Liam Dawson	Redcliffe, Brisbane Lions Academy, Aspley, Brisbane Lions	U18 (2013)			2015–2018	18	6	Raised in Redcliffe
Matthew Hammelmann	Morningside, Brisbane Lions Academy, Brisbane Lions				2015–2017	12	2	Raised in Brisbane
Tom Fields	Labrador	U18 (2011)			2015	2	0	Raised on Gold Coast
Charlie Cameron	Marist College Ashgrove, Brisbane Lions Academy, Brisbane Lions		2014	7	2014–	276	484	Born in Mount Isa and raised on Mornington Island Attended Marist College Ashgrove. (Lardil and Waanyi)
Aliir Aliir	Aspley, Brisbane Lions Academy		2013	44	2014–	200	7	Raised in Brisbane
Archie Smith	Mount Gravatt, Brisbane Lions Academy, Brisbane Lions				2014–2021	16	4	Born and raised in Brisbane
Alex Sexton	Springwood, Redland, Gold Coast	U16 (2010), U18 (2011)	2011	88	2013–2025	186	164	Raised and schooled in Logan.
Adam Oxley	Redland	U18 (2011, 2012)			2013–2018	34	10	Raised in Brisbane
Sam Michael	Manunda Hawks, Redland, Brisbane Lions	U18 (2011)			2013–2016	5	0	Raised in Cairns
Clay Cameron	Mount Gravatt, Gold Coast	U18 (2011)			2013–2016	23	5	Born and raised in Brisbane
Jonathan Freeman	Noosa, Brisbane Lions Academy, Brisbane Lions				2013–2015	14	16	Raised on the Sunshine Coast
Andrew Boston	Palm Beach Currumbin, Gold Coast Suns Academy, Gold Coast	U18 (2011, 2012)			2013–2015	16	10	Raised on the Gold Coast
Jordon Bourke	Morningside, Brisbane Lions Academy, Brisbane Lions	U18 (2011)			2013–2015	6	2	Raised in Brisbane
Dayne Zorko	Broadbeach, Brisbane Lions	U18 (2007 c), QLD (QAFL) (2011)	2011	(zone)	2012–	321	241	Born and raised on Gold Coast. Attended Benowa State High School.
Josh Jenkins	–				2012–2021	149	296	Raised in Townsville
Lee Spurr	Morningside				2012–2018	120	5	Raised in Brisbane
Tom Bell	Morningside, Brisbane Lions				2012–2018	72	56	Born and raised in Brisbane
Josh Hall	Curra Swans, Gold Coast				2012–2015	7	3	Born and raised in Townsville. Also professional NRL player
Peter Yagmoor	North Cairns, Kenmore Bears, St Peters College, Morningside	U18 (2011)			2012–2014	2	0	Raised in Cairns and Brisbane
Stephen Wrigley	Labrador, Brisbane Lions				2012–2013	3	0	Raised on the Gold Coast
Jackson Allen	Morningside, Gold Coast	U18 (2011)			2012–2013	4	0	Raised in Brisbane
Piers Flanagan	Gold Coast				2012	3	0	Raised and schooled on the Gold Coast
Charlie Dixon	Redlynch, Cairns Saints, Redland, Gold Coast	U18 (3 caps)			2011–	221	357	Born and raised in Cairns
Rory Thompson	Southport, Gold Coast				2011–2022	106	7	Raised on the Gold Coast
Tom Hickey	Morningside, Gold Coast	U18 (2010)			2011–2023	151	45	Born and raised in Brisbane
Zac Smith	Glenmore, Zillmere, Gold Coast				2011–2021	124	54	Born Biloela, raised in Rockhampton
Joel Wilkinson	Broadbeach, Gold Coast	U18 (2010 c)			2011–2013	26	1	Raised on the Gold Coast
Alik Magin	Labrador, Gold Coast				2011–2012	8	3	Raised on the Gold Coast
Israel Folau	–				2011–2012	13	2	Raised in and recruited from Brisbane
Rex Liddy	North Cairns, Kenmore, Gold Coast				2011	4	0	Raised in Cairns
Bryce Retzlaff	Labrador, Brisbane Lions				2011	11	6	Raised on the Gold Coast
Joseph Daye	Southport, Gold Coast				2011	4	1	Raised in Brisbane
Marc Lock	Southport, Gold Coast				2011	1	0	Raised on the Gold Coast
Claye Beams	Labrador, Brisbane Lions	U18 (2010)			2011	30	21	Raised on the Gold Coast
James Mulligan	Southport				2011	3	0	Raised on the Gold Coast
Josh Thomas	Redland	U18 (2009)			2010–2021	123	101	Born and raised in Queensland and raised
Daniel Stewart	Labrador				2010–2013	36	31	Raised on Gold Coast
Rohan Bail	Mount Gravatt				2010–2012	71	28	Raised in Brisbane
Broc McCauley	Surfers Paradise, Southport, Brisbane Lions	QLD (2009)			2010–2012	6	1	Born and raised on the Gold Coast
Lachlan Keeffe	Marist College Ashgrove				2009–	119	20	Born and raised in Gympie
Dayne Beams	Mudgeeraba, Southport, Brisbane Lions	U18 (2008 c)			2009–2020	112	118	Raised on the Gold Coast from age of 4
Brendan Whitecross	St Patrick's College, Kedron District Junior, Zillmere	U12 (2002), U16 (2005) (2006 c), U18 (2007 c)			2009–2018	111	45	Born and raised in Brisbane
Ben Warren	Genesis Christian College, Zillmere				2009–2012	29	34	Raised in Brisbane.
Rhys Magin	Noosa Tigers, Zillmere				2009	4	2	Born and raised in Nambour
Sam Reid	Zillmere				2008–2021	108	33	Born and raised in Bundaberg and Sunshine Coast
Jake Spencer	Redland				2008–2017	38	8	Raised in Townsville
Jesse White	John Paul College, Southport	U18 (2006)			2008–2017	127	148	Raised on the Gold Coast
Gavin Urquhart	Glenmore Bulls, Morningside	U19 (2006)			2008–2012	41	3	Born in Mackay, raised in Rockhampton
Scott Clouston	University of Queensland, Morningside, Brisbane Lions				2008	2	1	Raised in Brisbane
Jarrod Harbrow	South Cairns Cutters, Hermit Park Tigers, Gold Coast	U16 (2004), U18 (2006)			2007–2021	262	54	Born in Cairns raised in Cairns and Townsville (Yirrganydji and Kuku Yalanji))
Matt Eagles	Yeronga, Brisbane Lions				2007–2020	6	1	Recruited from Brisbane
David Armitage	Mackay East, Morningside	U19 (2006)			2007–2019	169	98	Born and raised in Mackay
Shaun Hampson	John Paul College, Mount Gravatt				2007–2018	98	38	Raised in Brisbane
John Williams	Morningside				2007–2010	1	0	Raised in and recruited fromBrisbane
Kurt Tippett	All Saints Anglican College, Southport	U18 (2006)			2007–2017	178	325	Raised on the Gold Coast
Ricky Petterd	Broadbeach	U19 (2006)			2007–2015	84	72	Raised in Brisbane
Tom Williams	Morningside				2007–2014	85	14	Raised and schooled in Brisbane
Brent Renouf	Surfers Paradise, Southport				2007–2014	68	13	Raised on the Gold Coast
Karmichael Hunt	Anglican Church Grammar School, Gold Coast				2007–2014	44	6	Raised in Brisbane
Albert Proud	Mount Gravatt, Brisbane Lions				2007–2010	29	10	Born Torres Strait Islands, raised in Brisbane
Daniel Dzufer	Caloundra, Zillmere Eagles, Suncoast Lions, Aspley, Brisbane Lions	U19 (2006)			2007–2009	1	0	Raised on the Sunshine Coast
Will Hamill	Southport, Brisbane Lions	U18 (2004 c)			2007	3	1	Raised in Brisbane
Joel Tippett	Southport, Gold Coast				2007	8	0	Raised on the Gold Coast
Brad Howard	St Joseph's College, Toowoomba, Redland				2007	2	0	Raised in Toowoomba
Sam Gilbert	Coolangatta Tweed Heads, Southport Sharks	U18 (?)			2006–2018	208	38	Raised on the Gold Coast
Courtenay Dempsey	Morningside				2006–2016	133	35	Born Mount Isa, raised in Cairns (Kalkatungu)
Cheynee Stiller	St Patrick's College, Northern Eagles, Brisbane Lions				2006–2012	100	21	Raised in Brisbane
Brad Moran	Southport				2006–2011	21	8	Raised (schooled) on the Gold Coast
Rhan Hooper	Ipswich Eagles, Brisbane Lions	U18 (2005)			2006–2010	54	56	Born in Charleville, Queensland raised in Ipswich (Kooma)
Scott Harding	Anglican Church Grammar School, Morningside, Brisbane Lions				2006–2010	50	15	Born on Thursday Island, raised and schooled in Brisbane
Jason Roe	Cairns City Cobras, Brisbane Lions				2006–2009	50	7	Raised in Cairns
Wayde Mills	Coolangatta Tweed Heads, Southport, Brisbane Lions	U19 (2006)			2006–2008	16	3	Born and raised on the Gold Coast
Marty Pask	Brisbane SHS, Western Magpies, Brisbane Lions				2006	8	4	Raised in Brisbane
Paul O'Shea	Rockhampton Brothers, Redland Bay, Brisbane Lions				2006	–	–	Raised in Rockhampton
Daniel Merrett	Southport, Brisbane Lions				2005–2016	200	70	Raised on the Gold Coast
Luke McGuane	Broadbeach, Brisbane Lions				2005–2015	112	46	Born and raised on the Gold Coast
Josh Drummond	Matthew Flinders Anglican College, Maroochydore, Northern Eagles, Brisbane Lions	U18 (2003)			2005–2012	94	35	Born and raised on the Sunshine Coast
Leigh Ryswyk	Southport, Brisbane Lions	U18 (2003)			2005	1	0	Raised on the Gold Coast
Andrew Raines	Marymount College, Southport, Brisbane Lions, Gold Coast				2004–2015	129	17	Raised on Gold Coast from the age of 1. Attended Marymount College, Gold Coast
Ben Hudson	Palm Beach Currumbin, University of Queensland, Mt Gravatt, Brisbane Lions				2004–2014	168	19	Raised in Brisbane from the age of 8
Joel Macdonald	Mt Gravatt, Brisbane Lions				2004–2013	124	6	Raised in Brisbane
Daniel Pratt	Aspley, Northern Eagles, Brisbane Lions	U18 (2000)			2004–2011	119	10	Raised in Brisbane
Marcus Allan	Aspley, Northern Eagles, Brisbane Lions				2004–2007	5	1	Raised in Brisbane
David Hale	Marymount College, Broadbeach	U16 (?), U18 (2001)			2003–2015	237	217	Raised on the Gold Coast
Lewis Roberts-Thomson	–				2003–2014	179	54	Born in Brisbane
Luke Weller	Northern Eagles, Brisbane Lions				2003, 2004	11	4	Raised in Brisbane
Brad Miller	Cannon Hill Anglican College, Mt Gravatt				2002–2017	157	120	Born and raised in Brisbane
Shane Morrison	Northern Eagles, Brisbane Lions				2002–2005	13	3	Raised in Cairns and Brisbane
Nick Riewoldt	Broadbeach, Southport	U18 (1999, 2000)			2001–2017	336	718	Raised on the Gold Coast from age of 9. Attended Robina State Primary School and All Saints Anglican School
Michael Osborne	Labrador				2001–2013	168	110	Raised on the Gold Coast
Jamie Charman	Sandgate, Brisbane Lions	U18 (2000)			2001–2009	129	55	Born in Maryborough and raised in Brisbane
Robert Copeland	Strathpine, Northern Eagles, Brisbane Lions	U16, U18 (1998)			2001–2008	143	39	Born in Redcliffe, raised in Kilcoy
Mitch Hahn	Kedron, Windsor-Zillmere				2000–2011	181	164	Born and raised in Brisbane
Trent Knobel	Broadbeach, Brisbane Lions				2000–2007	75	12	Born and raised on the Gold Coast
Nathan Clarke	Maroochydore, Brisbane Lions				2000–2002	6	4	Raised on Sunshine Coast
Stephen Kenna	St Mary's College Toowoomba, Morningside				2000,2004	5	3	Raised in Toowoomba
Brett Backwell	Northern Eagles				1999–2001	18	12	Raised in Brisbane
Dean Howard	–				1999	2	0	Raised on the Gold Coast
Simon Black	Brisbane Lions				1998–2013	322	171	Born in Mount Isa
Marc Woolnough	All Saints Anglican College, Southport				1998, 2002	6	1	Raised on the Gold Coast
Hamish Simpson	Kedron Grange				1998–2000	18	0	Raised and schooled in Brisbane
Ben Thompson	Kedron Grange, Northern Eagles				1998–1999	1	0	Raised in Brisbane
Max Hudghton	West Brisbane AFC				1997–2009	234	14	Raised in Brisbane
Mal Michael	Morningside, Brisbane Lions	QLD Team of the Century			1997–2008	238	33	Raised in Brisbane
Brett Voss	Trinity College, Beenleigh, Morningside, Brisbane Lions				1997–2007	170	67	Born and raised in Beenleigh, Logan (Brisbane)
Jason Akermanis	Mayne, Brisbane Lions	QLD Team of the Century			1996–2010	325	421	Raised in Brisbane from the age of 9. Attended St. Joseph's Nudgee College
Clint Bizzell	Wilston Grange				1996–2007	163	79	Born and raised in Brisbane
Clark Keating	Surfers Paradise, Brisbane Bears, Brisbane Lions				1996–2006	139	83	Born and raised on Gold Coast
Danny Dickfos	Windsor-Zillmere, Brisbane Bears, Brisbane Lions	QLD/NT (1993)			1996–1999	65	0	Born and raised in Brisbane
Derek Wirth	Springwood, Mt Gravatt, Brisbane Lions				1996–1999	1	2	Raised in Brisbane
Don Cockatoo-Collins	Cairns City Cobras				1996–1998	9	3	Born and raised in Cairns (Kuku Yalanji)
Steven Lawrence	Southport, Brisbane Lions	QLD/NT (1993)			1995–2003	120	60	Raised on the Gold Coast
Brent Green	Southport, Brisbane Lions				1995–1998	12	8	Raised on the Gold Coast
David Cockatoo-Collins	Cairns City Cobras				1995–1997	2	0	Born and raised in Cairns
Chris Scott	Brisbane Lions				1994–2007	215	79	Raised and schooled in Brisbane
Che Cockatoo-Collins	Cairns City Cobras	QLD/NT (1993)			1994–2003	160	215	Born in Brisbane, raised in Cairns (Kuku Yalanji)
Rudi Frigo	Mayne, Brisbane Bears	QLD/NT (1993)			1994–1995	8	1	Raised in Brisbane
Michael Voss	Trinity College, Beenleigh, Morningside, Brisbane Bears, Brisbane Lions	QLD, QLD/NT (1993), QLD Team of the Century			1992–2006	289	245	Raised in Beenleigh, Logan (Brisbane) from the age of 11. Attended Trinity College, Beenleigh.
Steven Handley	Southport	QLD			1992–1997	73	28	Raised on the Gold Coast
Steven McLuckie	Southport, Brisbane Bears	QLD/NT (1993)			1992–1993	20	8	Raised in Brisbane
Stephen Wearne	Coorparoo, Brisbane Bears				1992	3	2	Raised in Brisbane
Troy Clarke	South Cairns Cutters, Brisbane Bears	QLD (1991), QLD/NT (1993)			1991–1996	68	31	Raised in Cairns
Simon Luhrs	Western Districts, Brisbane Bears	QLD/NT (1993)			1991–1992	12	0	Raised in Brisbane
Corey Bell	Southport, Brisbane Bears	QLD			1991	8	2	Raised on Gold Coast
Jason Millar	Caloundra, Brisbane Bears	QLD			1991	1	0	Raised on Sunshine Coast
Matthew Kennedy	Southport, Brisbane Bears, Brisbane Lions	QLD/NT (1993)			1990–2001	188	30	Raised on Gold Coast
Ray Windsor	Western Districts, Brisbane Bears	QLD, QLD/NT (1993)			1990–1993	23	22	Raised in Brisbane
David Wearne	Coorparoo, Brisbane Bears	QLD/NT (1993)			1990–1993	18	2	Raised in Brisbane
Marcus Ashcroft	Southport, Brisbane Bears, Brisbane Lions	QLD/NT (1993), QLD Team of the Century			1989–2003	318	145	Raised on Gold Coast from the age of 3. Attended Merrimac State High School.
Simon Hose	Western Districts AFC, Brisbane Bears				1989	5	2	Raised in Brisbane
Stephen Lawrence	Southport	QLD			1988–1998	146	30	Raised on the Gold Coast
Tony Lynn	Morningside, Mt Gravatt, Brisbane Bears	QLD/NT (1993)			1988–1996	33	19	Raised in Beenleigh, Logan (Brisbane)
Matthew Simpson	Mayne, Brisbane Bears				1988	9	2	Raised in Brisbane
Gavin Crosisca	Western Districts AFC	QLD (1998), QLD Team of the Century			1987–2000	246	64	Born and raised in Brisbane
Dean McRae	Sandgate				1987–1996	141	55	Raised on Bribie Island, Sunshine Coast
Darren Carlson	Southport, Brisbane Bears	QLD (1988), QLD/NT (1993)			1987–1990	25	7	Raised on the Gold Coast
Stuart Glascott	Southport, Brisbane Bears	QLD (1988)			1987	4	0	Raised on the Gold Coast
Tony Beckett	Mayne, Brisbane Bears	QLD (18 caps)			1987	6	2	Raised in Brisbane
Allan Giffard	Sherwood, Brisbane Bears	QLD (12 caps)			1987	1	0	Raised in Brisbane
Tony Smith	Morningside	QLD (1988)			1986–1988	17	1	Raised in Brisbane
Jason Dunstall	Coorparoo	QLD (3 caps: 1992), QLD/NT (1993), QLD Team of the Century			1985–1998	269	1254	Born and Raised in Brisbane. Attended Anglican Church Grammar School.
Michael Gibson	Coorparoo, Brisbane Bears	QLD (15 caps: 1988)			1985–1991	55	3	Born and raised in Brisbane
Trevor Spencer	Jindalee	QLD (1988)			1985–1991	44	29	Raised in Brisbane
Craig Potter	Western Districts, Brisbane Bears	QLD/NT (1993)			1984–1992	55	19	Raised in Brisbane
Craig Brittain	North Cairns, Windsor-Zillmere	U18 (?)			1984	5	2	Raised in Cairns
Scott McIvor	Wilston Grange, Brisbane Bears, Brisbane Lions	QLD (17 caps: 1984–?), QLD Team of the Century			1985–1997	200	96	Born and raised in Brisbane. QLD Team of the Century member.
Gary Shaw	Western Districts, Brisbane Bears				1983–1987	38	38	Raised in Brisbane
Carl Herbert	Mayne	QLD (1988)			1983	3	0	Raised in Brisbane
Brett Grimley	Wilston Grange	QLD (1988)			1983–85	18	2	Raised in Brisbane
Richard Loveridge	–				1982–1989	136	119	Born in Brisbane
Zane Taylor	Southport	QLD (26 caps: 1988), QLD Team of the Century			1980–1983	27	12	Raised in Brisbane from age of 17. Represented QLD 27 times. Queensland Team of the Century member.
Frank Dunell	Zillmere, Brisbane Bears	QLD (7 caps: 1988)			1979–1988	115	61	Raised in Brisbane
Howard Tarpey	Morningside				1979	1	0	Recruited from Brisbane
Warren Jones	Morningside	QLD (1979)			1978–1988	123	36	Raised in Brisbane
Barry Denny	South Brisbane, Morningside	QLD (7 caps)			1977–1979	22	3	Raised in Brisbane.
Glen Scanlon	Coorparoo				1977–1978	9	4	Raised in Brisbane.
Robert Shepherd	Western Districts				1975–1977	43	31	Raised in and recruited from Brisbane
Mark Maclure	Coorparoo	QLD (1988)			1974–1986	243	327	Raised in Brisbane
Alan Hunter	Sherwood Magpies, Western Districts	U18 (1961)			1964–1967	15	8	Raised in and recruited from Brisbane (Sherwood area)
Col Kimmorley	Western Suburbs				1976	4	1	Raised in Brisbane.
Ken Grimley	Wilston Grange	QLD (c 1963, 1964) (22 caps)			1957	9	16	Raised in Brisbane
Tom Broadbent	Sandgate	QLD (1953–1958)			1957	1	0	Raised in Brisbane.
Erwin Dornau	Kedron Football Club	QLD (1946, 1947)			1948–1952	54	8	Born and raised in Brisbane.
Tom Calder	Coorparoo	QLD (1947 c, 1950)			1945	5	0	Lived in Brisbane for some time
George Frederick ("Stork") Orford	Windsor				1940	1	0	Born and raised in Brisbane
Joseph O'Carroll	–				1920	3	2	Born in Enoggera
Jack Robertson	–				1909–1913	60	16	Born in Woolloongabba
Jim Slater	–				1905	4	0	Born in Pine Hill

=== Women's ===
==== Current Players ====
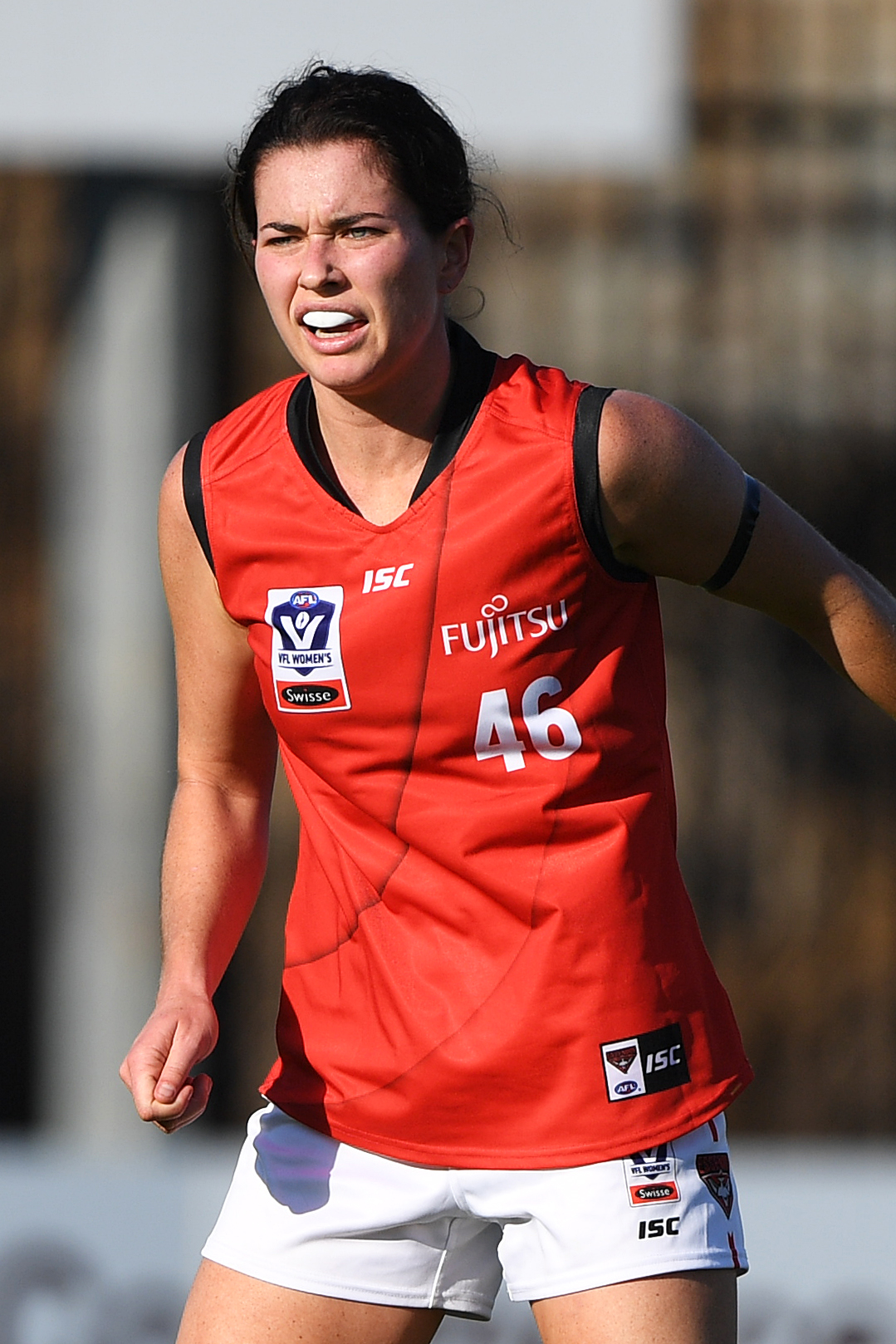
Lauren Ahrens is from the Gold Coast

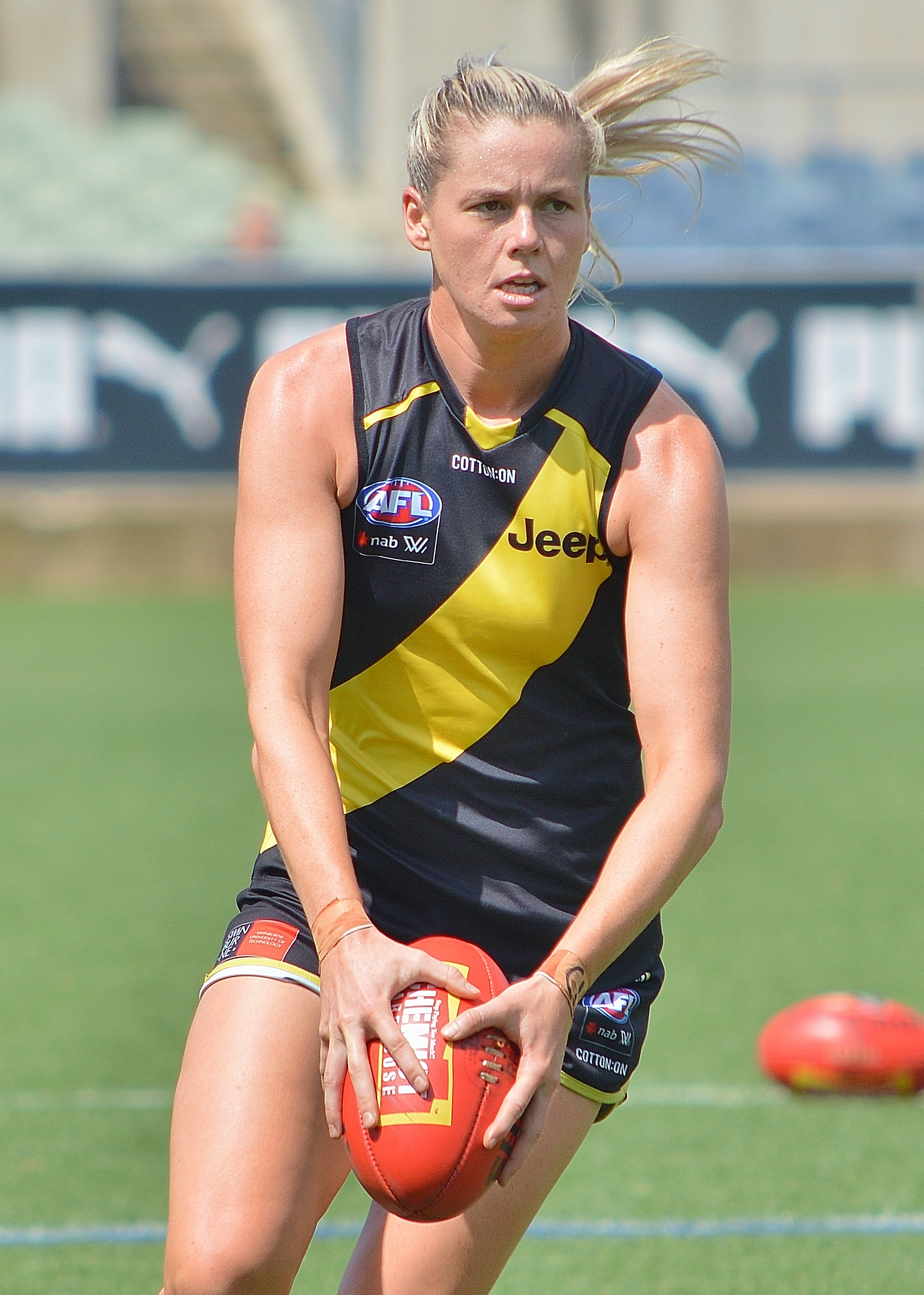
Katie Brennan is from Logan

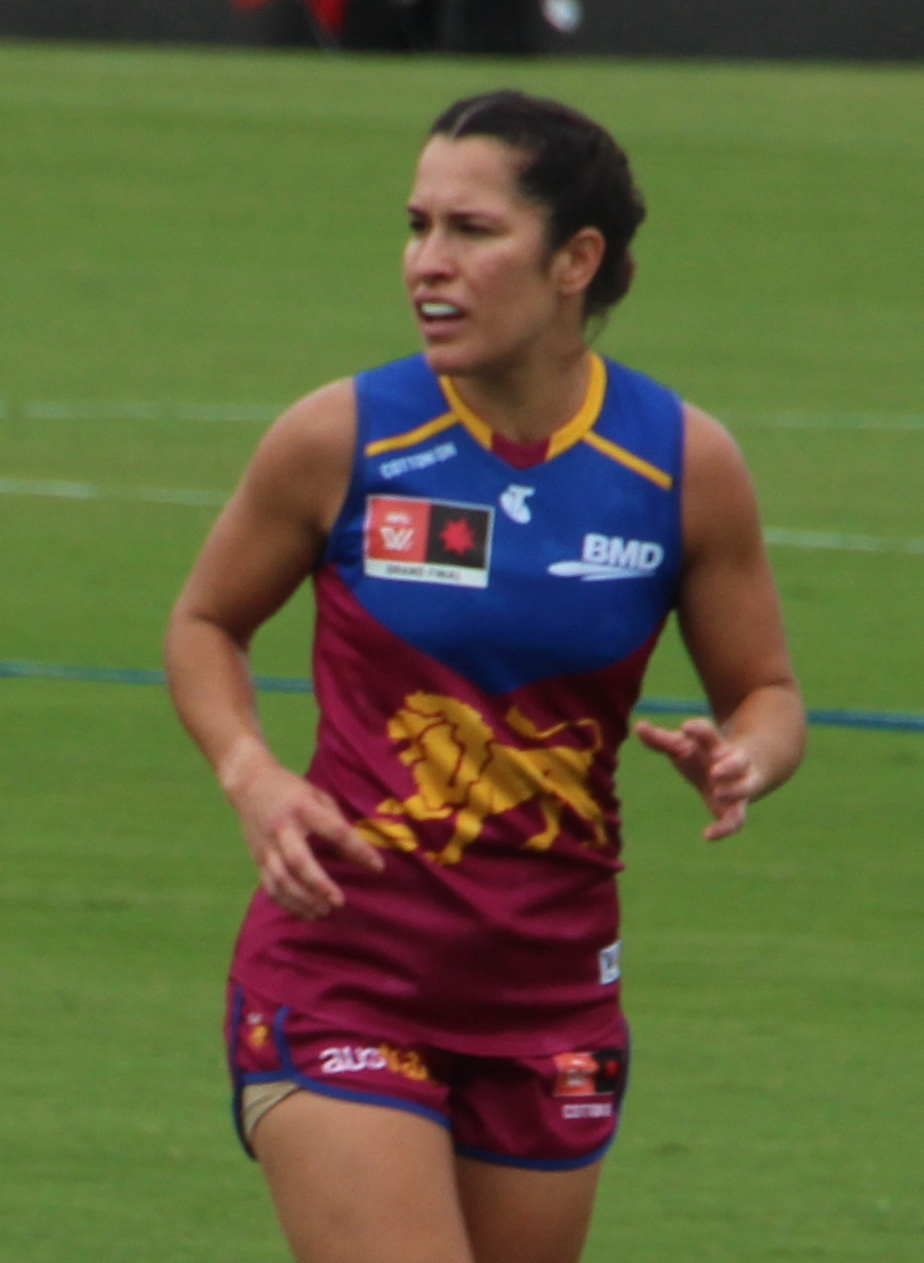
Ally Anderson is from Brisbane (Gangulu)

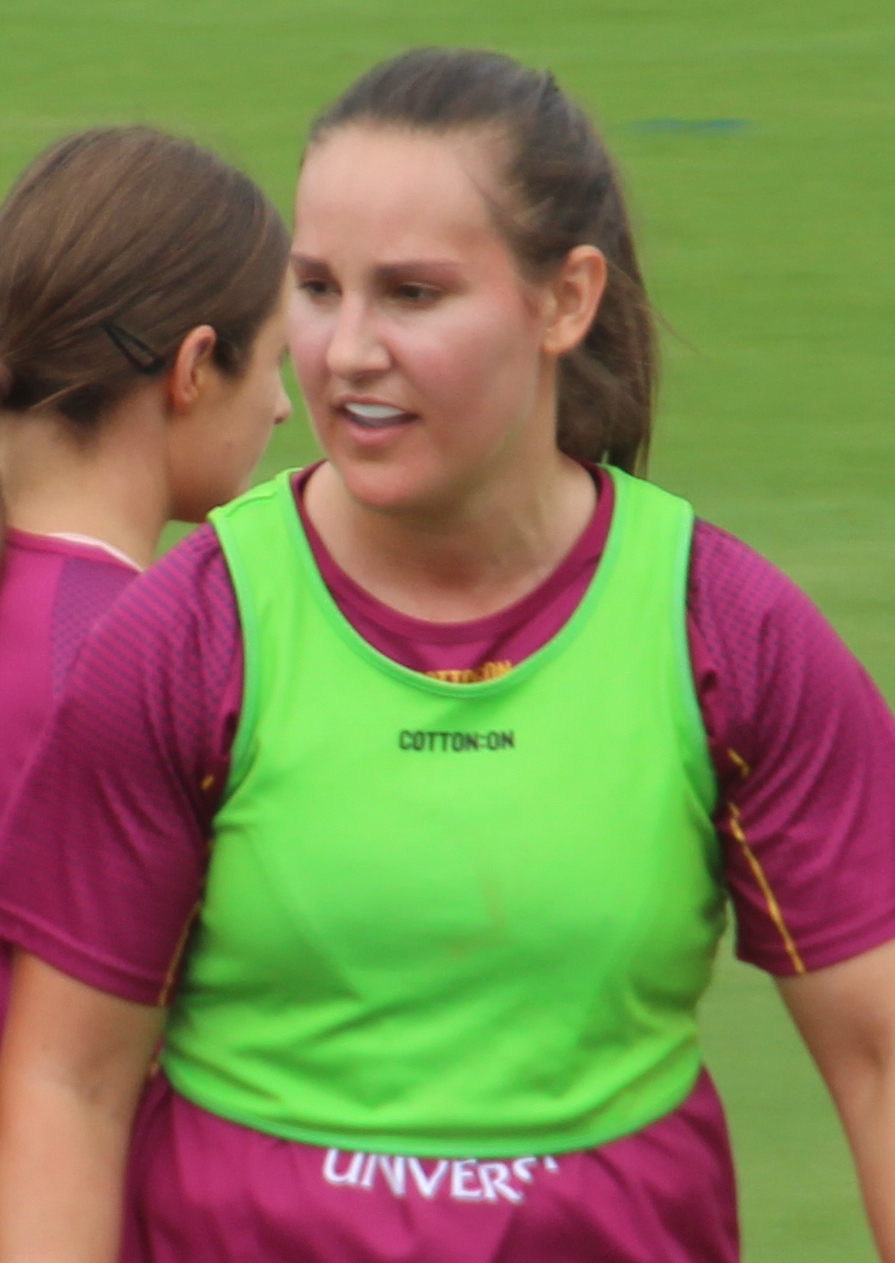
Breanna Koenen is from Magnetic Island

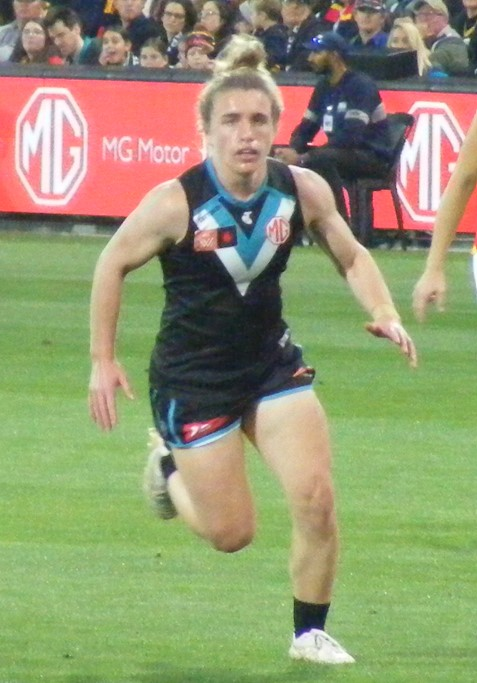
Maria Moloney is from Brisbane

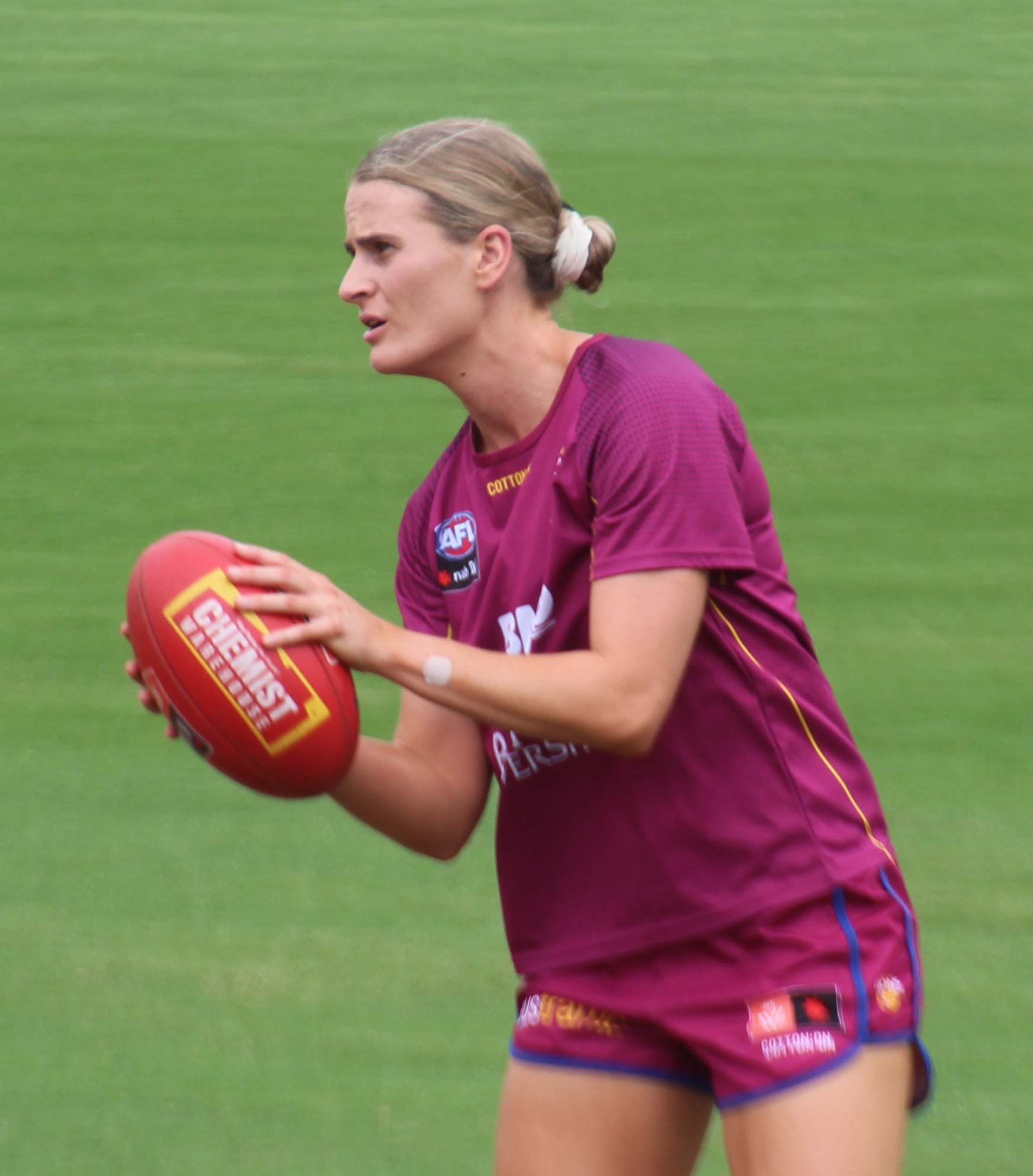
Greta Bodey is from Brisbane

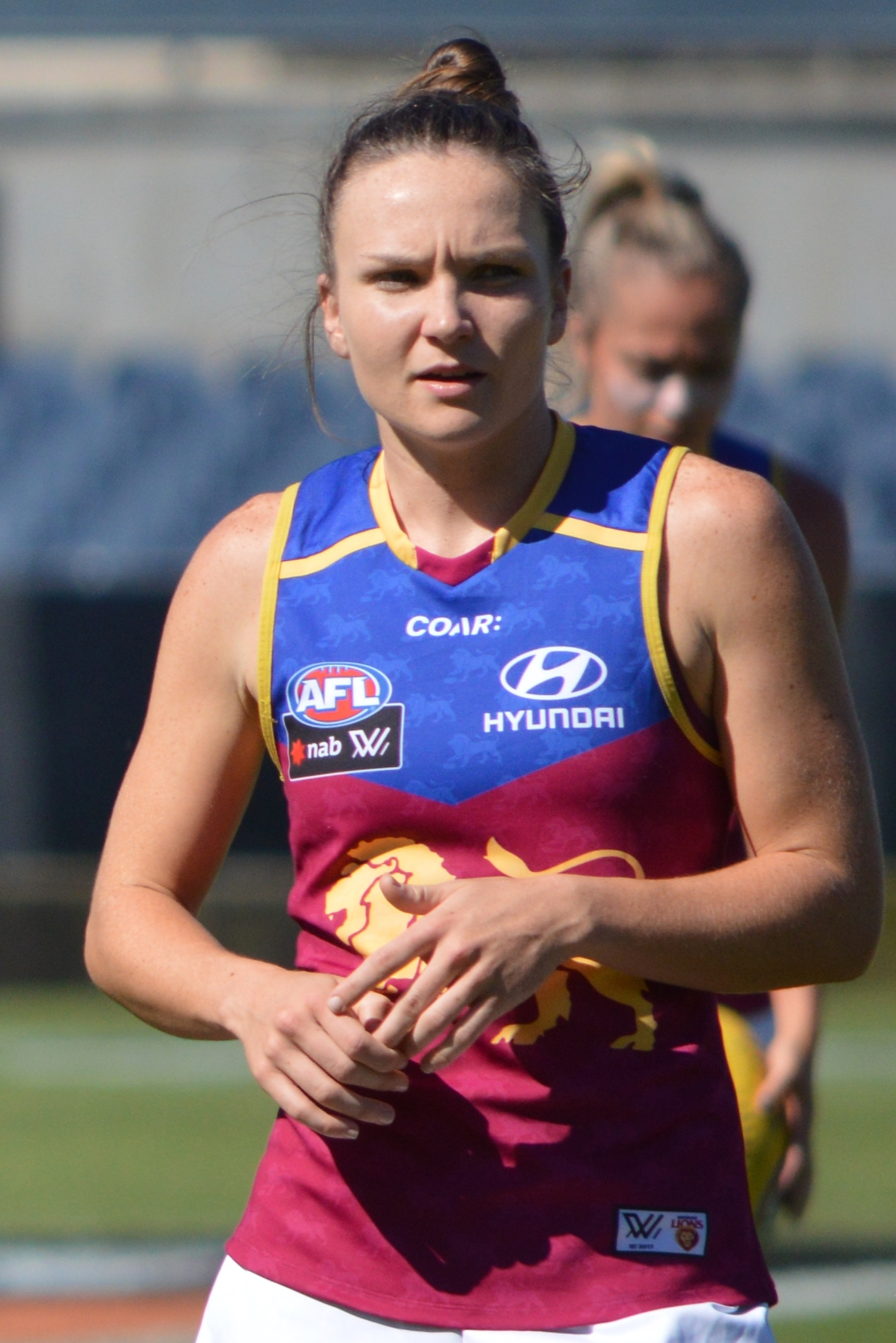
Emily Bates is from Brisbane

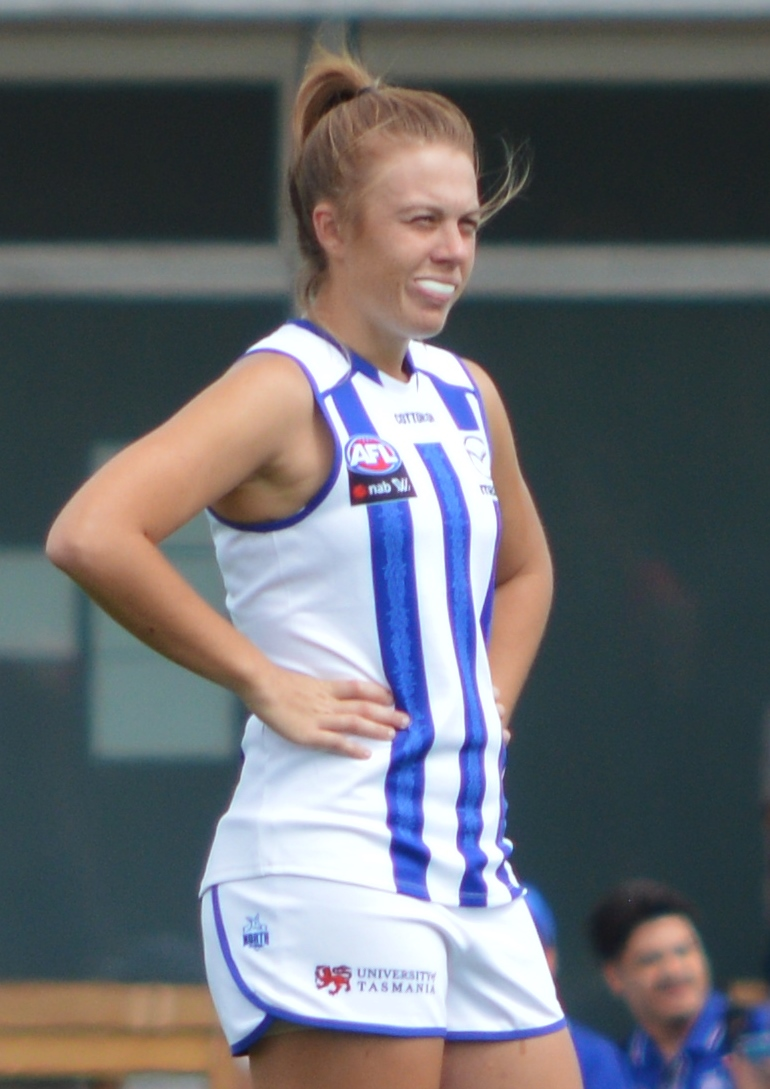
Jamie Stanton is from the Gold Coast

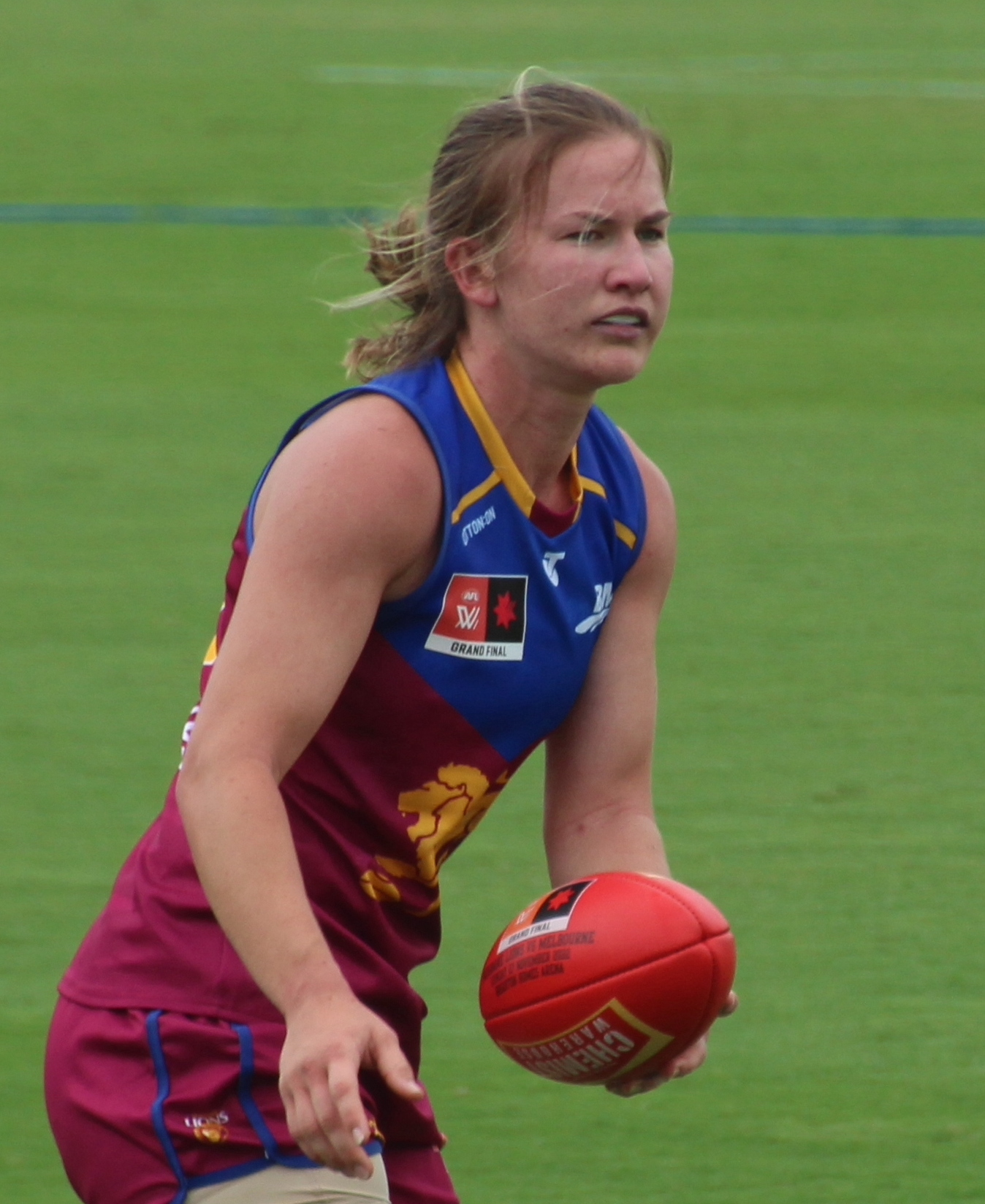
Shannon Campbell is from the Sunshine Coast

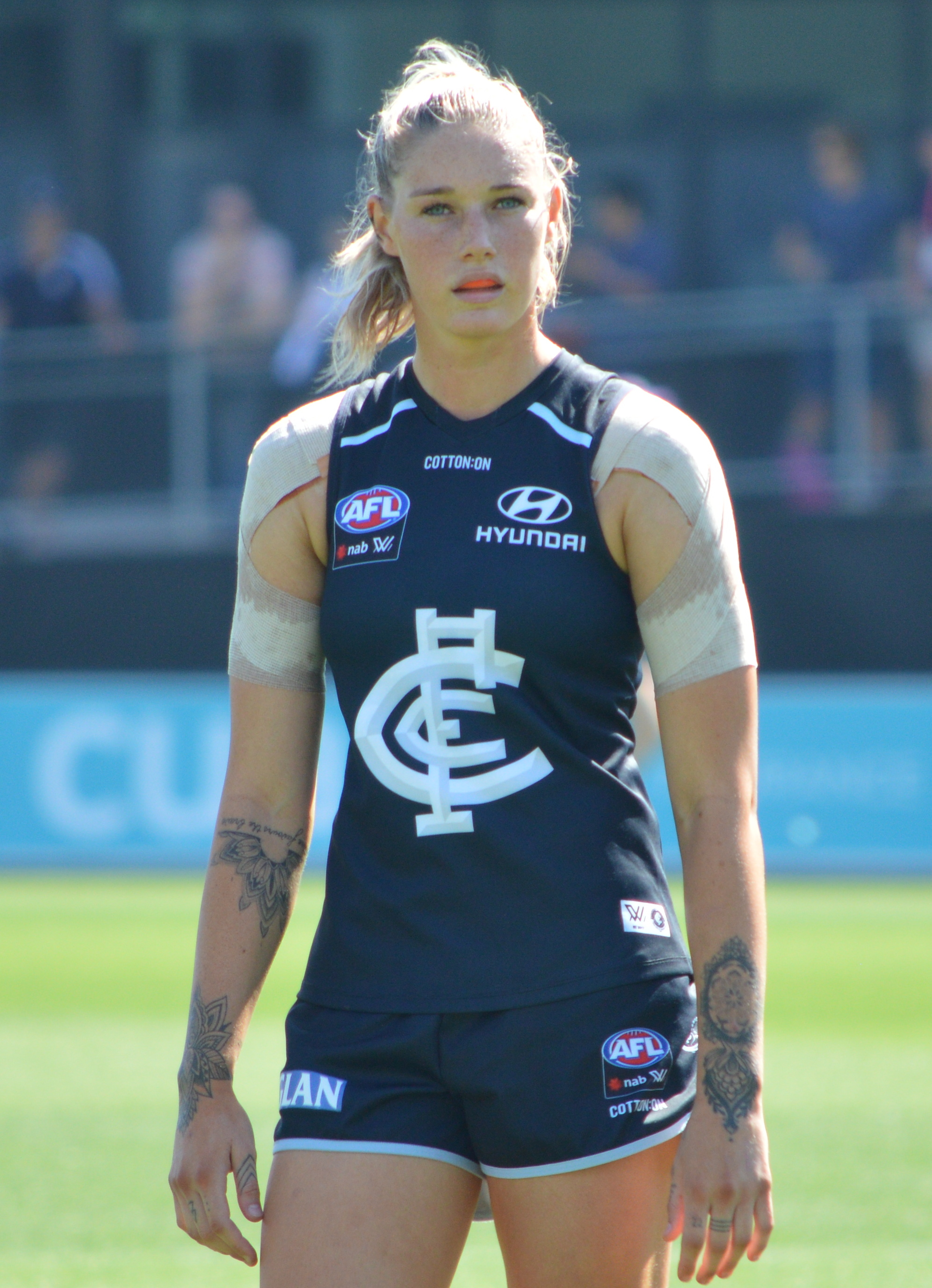
Tayla Harris is from Brisbane

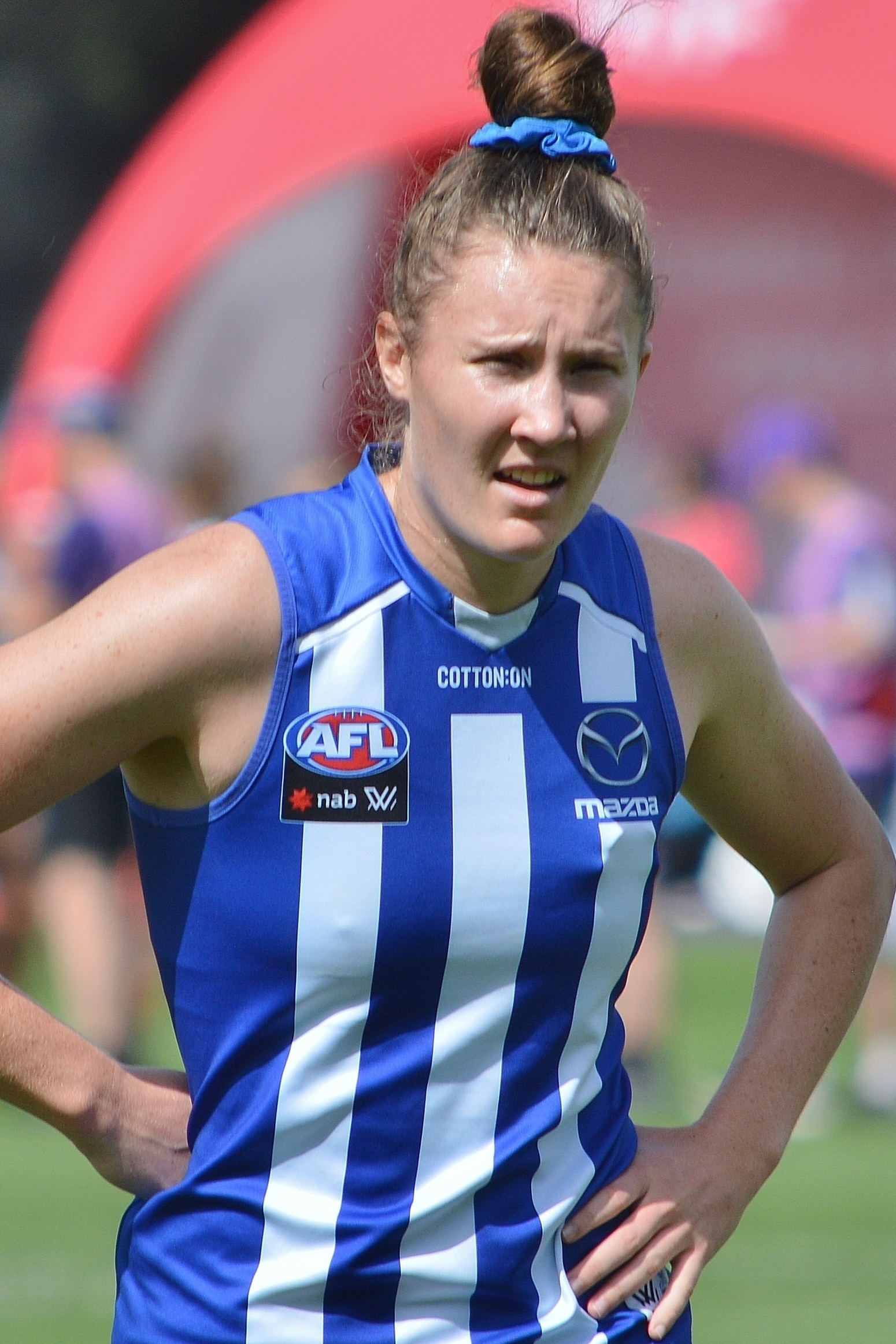
Tahlia Randall is from Buderim on the Sunshine Coast

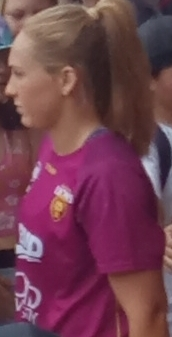
Lulu Pullar is from Brisbane

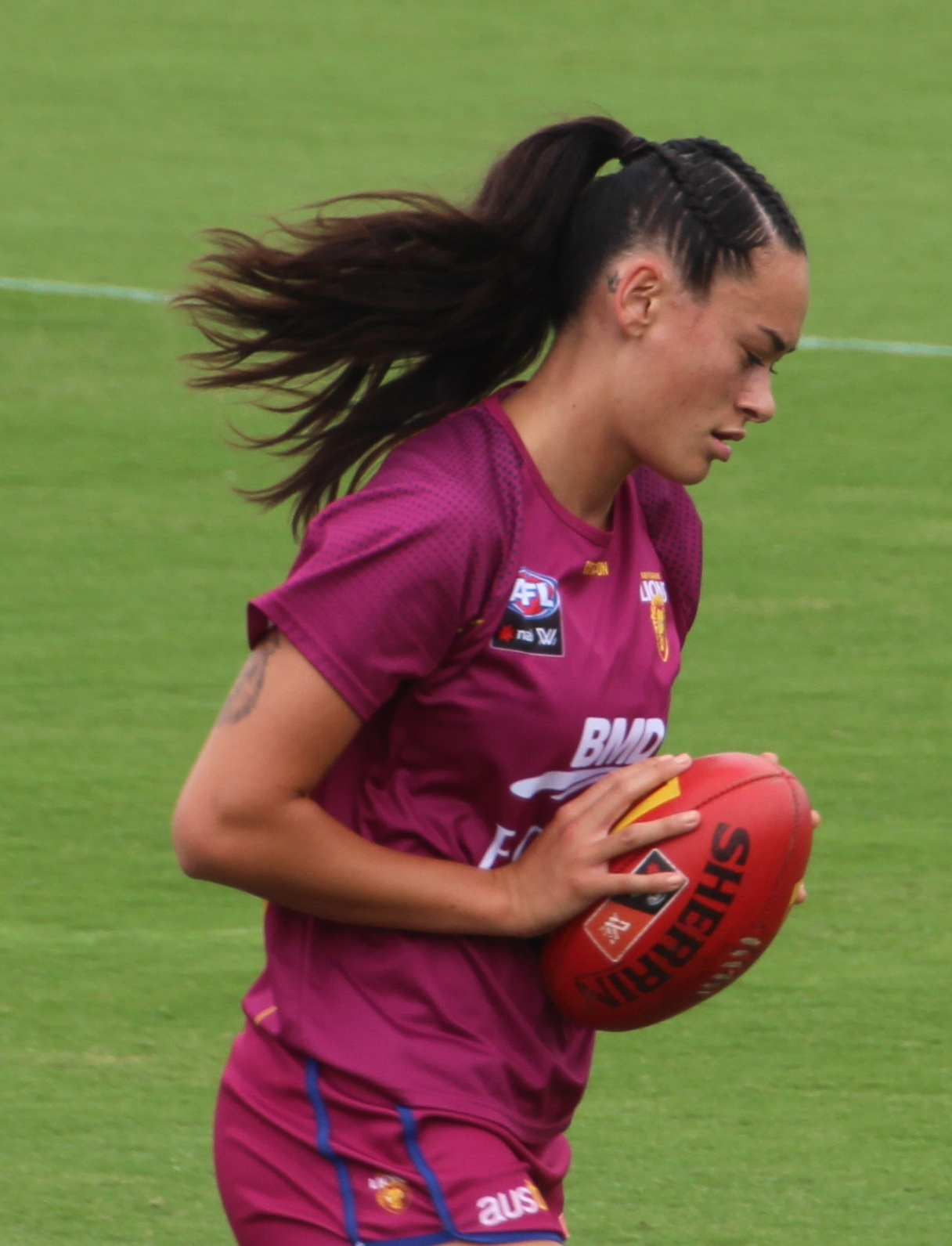
Jesse Tawhiao-Wardlaw is from Brisbane

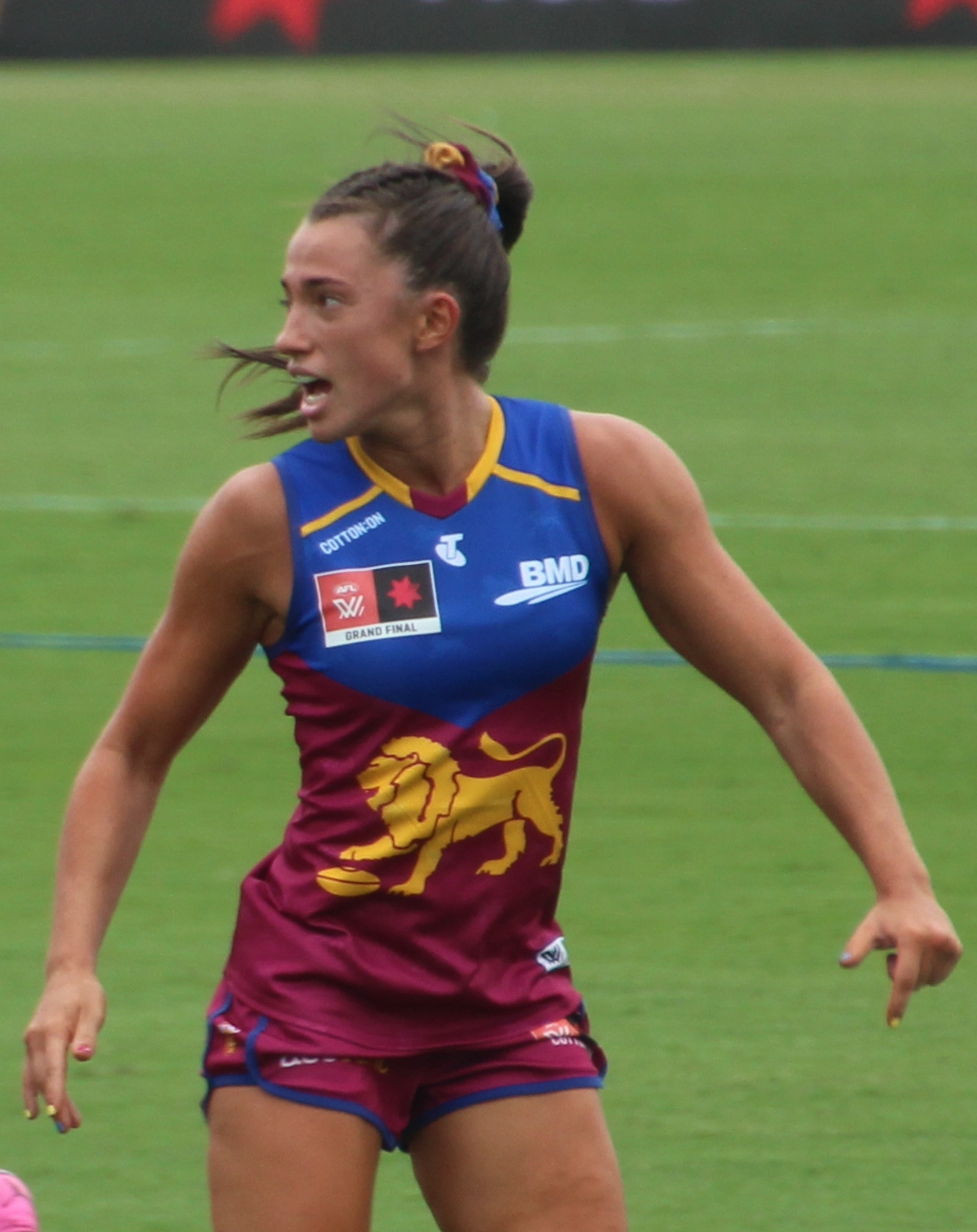
Jade Ellenger is from Brisbane

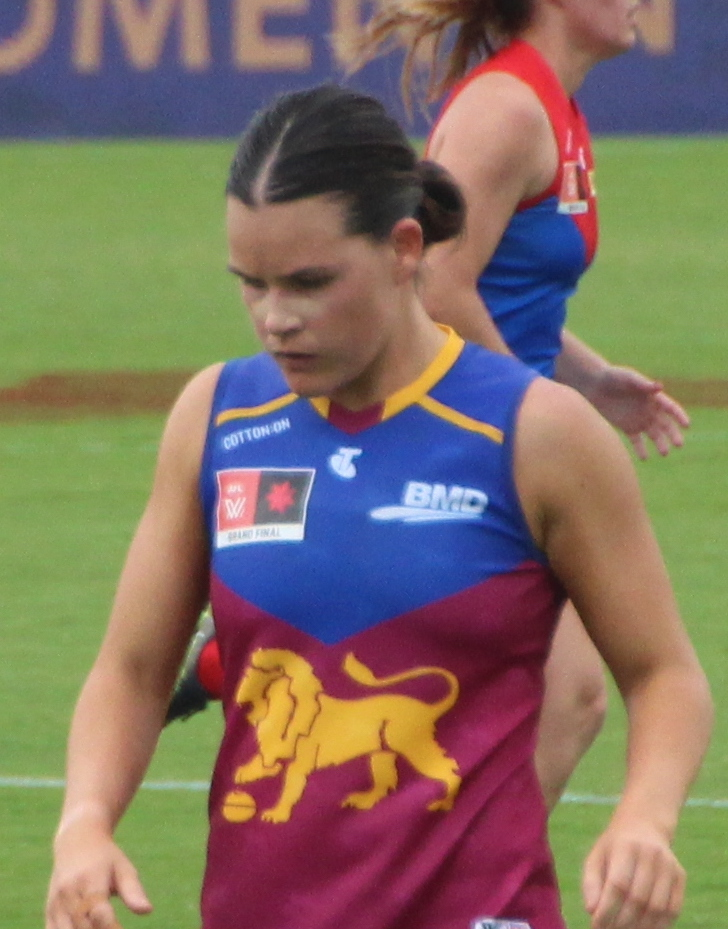
Sophie Conway is from Bracken Ridge in Brisbane

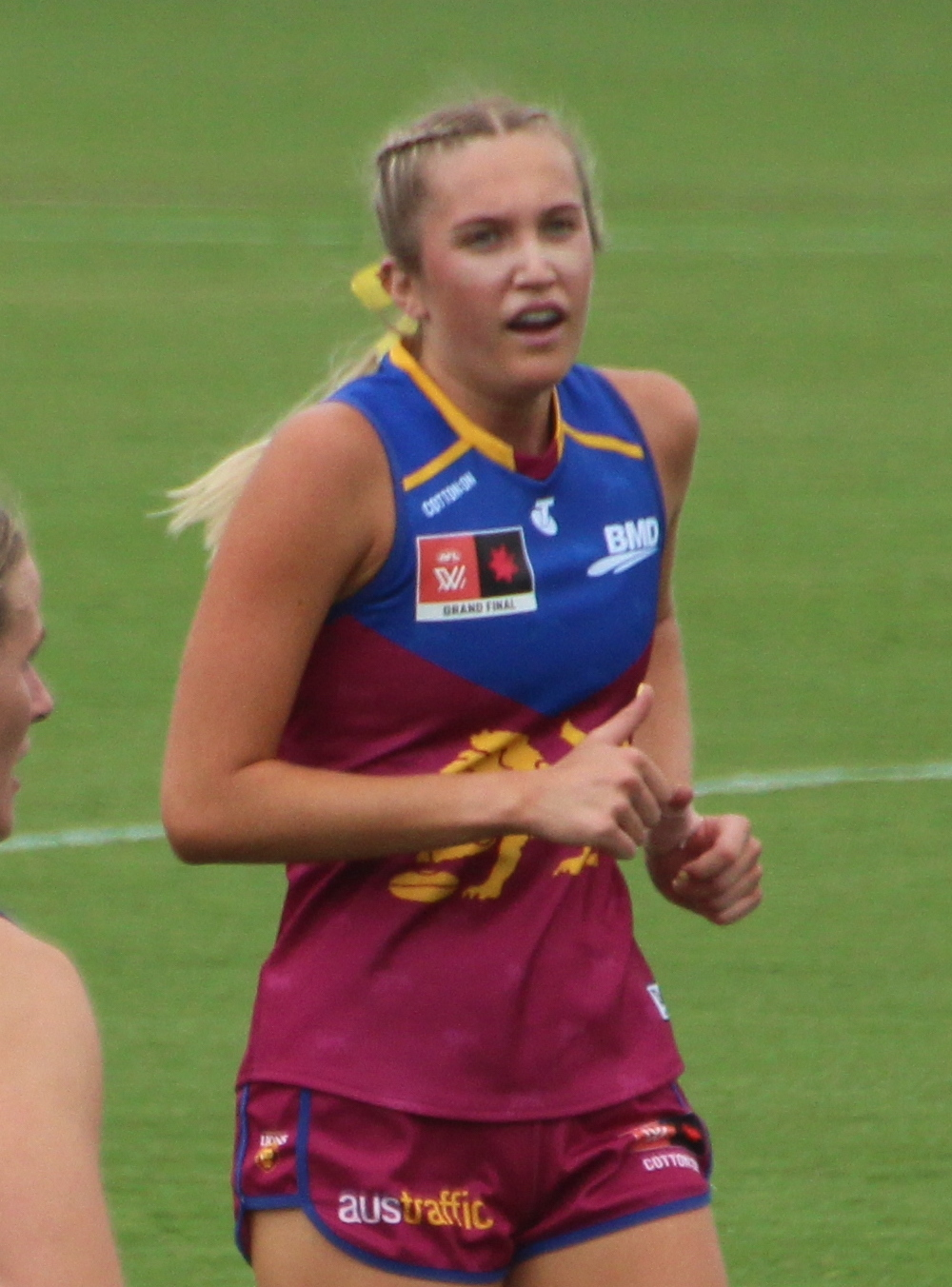
Taylor Smith is from the Gold Coast

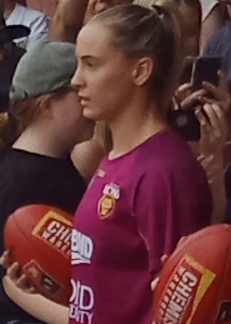
Nat Grider is from Brisbane

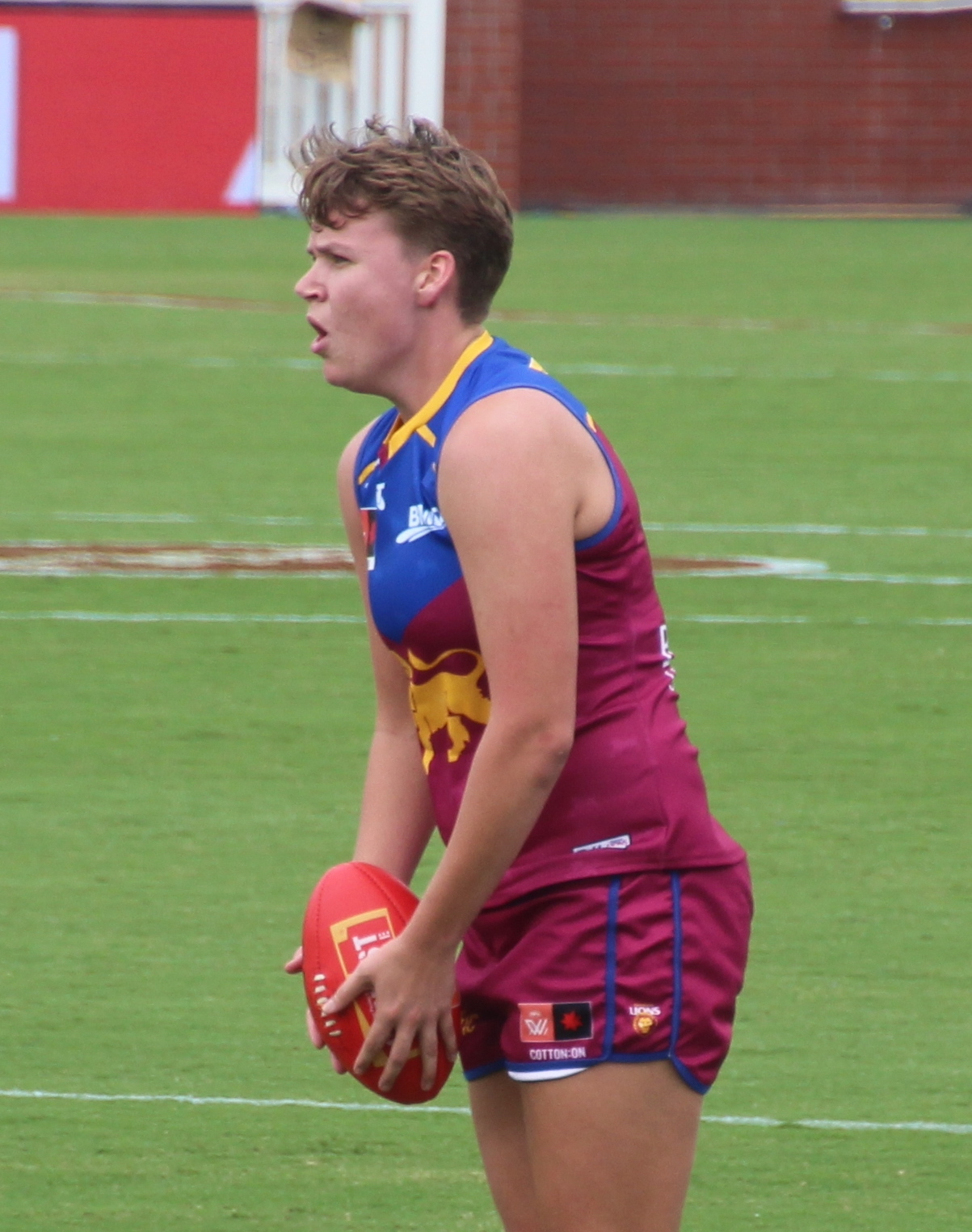
Dakota Davidson is from Ipswich

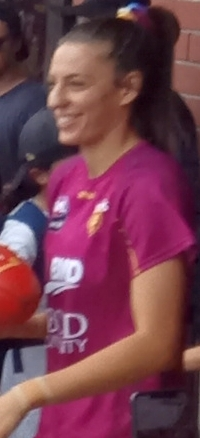
Tahlia Hickie is from Brisbane

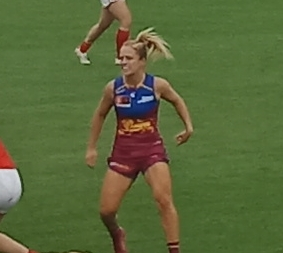
Belle Dawes is from Maroochydore on the Sunshine Coast

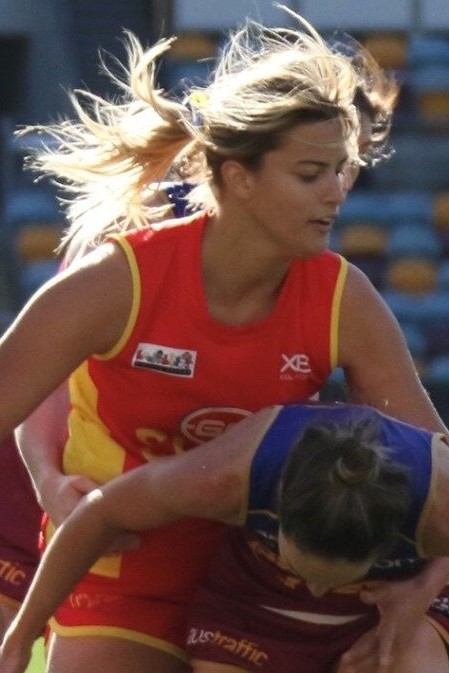
Lauren Bella is from Mackay

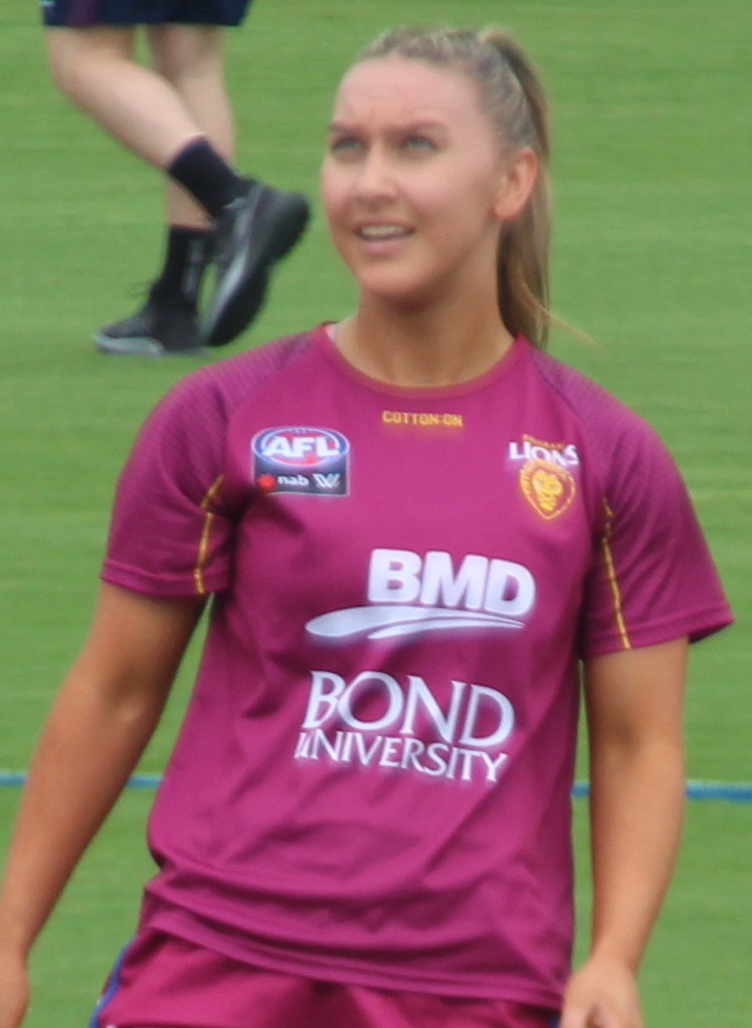
Mikayla Pauga is from the Sunshine Coast

==== AFLW players from Queensland ====
Player name	Status	QLD Indigenous links	QLD Place of birth	QLD junior club/s	QLD senior club/s	QLD representative	AFLW Draft (QLD club)	AFLW Draft (Year, Selection)	AFLW Debut (Year, Season Round)	AFLW Games	AFLW (Goals)	Connections to QLD, Notes & References
Maisy Evans	Active				Bond University	U18	Bond University	2026, Pre-season (2)	2026, R9	2	1	Moved to Queensland at Age 18. Recruited from there.
Dekota Baron	Active			Springwood, Gold Coast Suns Academy, Broadbeach	Broadbeach, Southport, Gold Coast Suns	U18	Gold Coast Suns Academy	2025, Pick 15	2026, R1	4	5	From Gold Coast
Heidi Talbot	Active	Torres Strait Islander		Bond University, North Cairns, Gold Coast Suns Academy	Gold Coast Suns		Bond University	2024, 27	2026, R1	10	0	Raised on Saibai Island and in Cairns
Georja Davies	Active			Southport, Gold Coast Suns Academy	Gold Coast Suns	U18	Gold Coast Suns Academy	2025, 9	2026, R1	10	0	From Gold Coast
Rania Crozier	Active			Morningside, Moreton Bay, West Juniors, Wilston Grange, Aspley, Brisbane Lions Academy	Aspley, Brisbane Lions	U18 (2023)	Brisbane Lions Academy	2023, 31	2025, R6	9	2	From Brisbane
Sunny Lappin	Active			Southport	Southport, Gold Coast Suns	U18 (2025)	Gold Coast Suns Academy	2025, 4	2026, R1	3	1	Raised on the Gold Coast from the age of 6
Mikayla Nurse	Active			Jimboomba, Pacific Pines	Southport, Gold Coast Suns	U18 (2025)	Gold Coast Suns Academy	2025, Pick 13	2026, R1	6	0	Raised in Jimboomba and Gold Coast
Bronte Parker	Active			Burleigh, Gold Coast Suns Academy	Bond University, Gold Coast Suns	U18 (2024)	Gold Coast Suns Academy	2025, 32	2026, R1	9	0	From Gold Coast
Ava Usher	Active		Cairns	Burleigh	Bond University, Gold Coast Suns	U18 (2025)	Gold Coast Suns Academy	2025, 7	2026, R1	10	10	Born in Cairns, raised on Gold Coast from age of 2
Alannah Welsh	Active			Coolangatta Tweed, Gold Coast Suns Academy	Burleigh, Southport, Gold Coast Suns	U18 (2025)	Gold Coast Suns Academy	2025, 12	2026, R1	7	8	From Gold Coast
Rhianna Ingram	Active			Southport, Gold Coast Suns Academy	Gold Coast Suns	U18 (2025)	Gold Coast Suns Academy	2025, 44	2026, R7	4	0	From Gold Coast
Jo Miller	Active			Redland-Victoria Point, Coorparoo					2024, R9	1	0	Raised in Brisbane
Taya Oliver	Active			Coorparoo	Gold Coast				2024, R6	5	4	Recruited from Brisbane
Lily Tarlinton	Active			Eastern Swans, Coorparoo, Mackay Magpies, Whitsunday Sea Eagles, North Mackay Saints, Moranbah Bulldogs, Mackay City Hawks, Bond University		U18 (2019), U19 (2021)			2024, R7	1	0	Raised in Mackay, recruited from the Gold Coast
Caitlin Thorne	Active			Tweed Coolangatta Juniors, Palm Beach Currumbin, Gold Coast Suns Academy, Burleigh, Bond University		U18 (2023)			2024, R4	3	0	Raised on the Gold Coast
Evie Long	Active			Narangba Juniors, Sandgate Juniors, Aspley, Sandgate, Brisbane Lions Academy	Brisbane	U18 (2023)			2024, R4	7	1	Raised in Narangba, Moreton Bay
Sophie Peters	Active			Maroochydore, Brisbane Lions Academy	Brisbane	U18 (2022, 2023)			2024, R3	3	0	Raised on the Sunshine Coast
Courtnery Murphy	Active			Mountain Creek, Brisbane Lions Academy	Brisbane	U18 (2016)			2024, R2	1	0	Raised on Sunshine Coast (Mountain Creek)
Ryleigh Wotherspoon	Active			Sherwood Districts				2023, 12	2024, R1	33	20	Raised in Mackay, recruited from Brisbane
Kiara Hillier	Active			Kawana, Maroochydore, Brisbane Lions Academy	Brisbane	U18 (2022)		2022, #78	2024, R1	2	0	Raised on Sunshine Coast
Bella Smith	Active			Noosa, Narangba, Maroochydore (QAFLW), Brisbane Lions Academy	Brisbane	U18 (2021)			2021, R1	5	0	Raised on Sunshine Coast
Caitlin Miller	Active			Southport, Gold Coast Suns Academy		U17 (2021), U18 (2022)			2023, R2	6	1	Raised on Gold Coast
Poppy Boltz	Active			Centrals-Trinity Beach Bulldogs, Cairns Saints, Southport, Gold Coast Suns Academy	Brisbane	U18 (2017)		2023, supplementary #16	2023, R2	35	2	Raised in Cairns
Fleur Davies	Active			Southport, Gold Coast Suns Academy	Southport	U17 (2021), U18 (2022)		2021, 64	2023, R1	21	2	Raised on Gold Coast
Charlotte Mullins	Active		North Lakes	North Lakes, Ferny Grove, Wilston Grange, Brisbane Lions Academy	Aspley, Brisbane	U19 (2021), U18 (2022)	Aspley	2022, 70	2023, R1	50	22	Raised in Moreton (Brisbane)
Ella Smith	Active			Sandgate, Aspley, Brisbane Lions Academy	Brisbane, Gold Coast				2023, R1	4	0	Raised in Brisbane
Beth Pinchin	Active			Broadbeach, Coolangatta, Gold Coast Suns Academy					2023, R1	5	0	Raised in Coolangatta (Gold Coast)
Brianna McFarlane	Active			Coolangatta, Wilston Grange, Maroochydore, Southport					2023, R1	11	7	Raised on Gold Coast
Meara Girvan	Active				Bond University, Gold Coast			2023, Supplementary pick 10	2023, R1	37	3	Moved to Queensland at age of 25. Recruited from the Gold Coast
Alana Gee	Active			North Mackay, Southport, Gold Coast Suns Academy	Gold Coast				2023, R1	7	1	Raised in Mackay
Darcie Davies	Active			Southport, Gold Coast Suns Academy	Gold Coast			2023, Supplementary	2023, R1	40	13	Raised on Gold Coast
Giselle Davies	Active			Southport, Gold Coast Suns Academy	Bond University, Gold Coast	U18 (2021)		2021, 30	2022 (S6), R2	19	2	Raised on Gold Coast
Cambridge McCormick	Active		Queensland	Kawana Park Junior				2022, 84	2022 (S6), R1	45	1	Raised on the Sunshine Coast
Kaylee Kimber	Active			Moranbah Bulldogs	Southport Gold Coast	U18 (2022)		2022, Free agent	2022 (S6), R8	31	1	Raised in Moranbah
Jasmyn Smith	Active		Gold Coast	Broadbeach, Gold Coast Suns Academy	Broadbeach, Bond University, Gold Coast	U18 (2022c)		2022, 52	2022 (S6), R1	35	4	Raised on Gold Coast
Mikayla Pauga	Active		Brisbane	Narangba State High School, Narangba Juniors, Brisbane Lions Academy, Maroochydore	Bond University, Brisbane	U18 (2021)		2021, 46	2022 (S7), R5	46	4	Raised in Morayfield, Moreton Bay
Jacqueline Dupuy	Active			Cairns Saints, Maroochydore	Gold Coast			2021, Free agent	2022 (S6), R1	59	44	Raised in Cairns from the age of 18
Zimmorlei Farquharson	Inactive		Dalby	Dalby Swans, Yeronga	Brisbane	U18 (2016, 2017, 2018)		2020, 8	2022 (S6), R3	19	12	Raised in Dalby and Toowoomba
Luka Yoshida-Martin	Inactive			University of Queensland	Brisbane			2021, #53	2022 (S6), R6	5	2	Raised in Brisbane
Lulu Pullar	Active		Queensland	Bond University	Brisbane			2021, #58	2022 (S6), R5	46	4	Raised in Brisbane
Cassidhe Simmons	Inactive			Bond University					2022 (S6), R4	2	0	Raised on Gold Coast
Indy Tahau	Active				Brisbane			2020, #37	2021, R14	48	32	Raised in Cunnamulla to the age of 9
Lucy Single	Active		Gold Coast	Burleigh	Gold Coast			2020, #57	2021, R1	59	4	Born and raised on Gold Coast
Daisy D'Arcy	Active			Hermit Park, Gold Coast Suns Academy	Gold Coast	U18 (2020)		2020, #60	2021, R1	60	3	Raised in Townsville
Wallis Randell	Active			Mackay Magpies, Bond University, Gold Coast Suns Academy	Gold Coast	U18 (2019)		2020, #61	2021, R5	42	0	Raised in Carmila
Maddison Levi	Inactive			Bond University	Gold Coast	U18 (2019)		2020, #50	2021, R1	8	3	Raised on Gold Coast
Annise Bradfield	Inactive			Labrador, Gold Coast Suns Academy, Southport, Bond University	Gold Coast			2020, #7	2021, R1	8	0	
Lauren Ahrens	Active		Gold Coast		Gold Coast			2019, Prelist	2020, R1	68	1	Born and raised on Gold Coast
Ellie Hampson	Active		Townsville	Hermit Park, Gold Coast Suns Academy	Gold Coast	U18 (2017, 2018, 2019)		2019, Prelist	2020, R2	58	26	Raised in Townsville
Belle Dawes	Active			Brisbane Lions Academy, Maroochydore	Brisbane	U18 (2017, 2018, 2019)		2019, #15	2020, R1	93	14	Raised on Sunshine Coast from the age of 12
Dakota Davidson	Active		Ipswich	University of Queensland	Brisbane			2019, #60	2020, R1	87	92	Born and raised in Ipswich
Maria Moloney				University of Queensland				2019, #75	2020, R1	64	7	Raised in Brisbane
Jade Pregelj	Active		Logan	Logan City Cobras, Yeronga	Gold Coast, Brisbane	2011		2019, 86	2020, R1	20	0	Born and raised in Logan
Charlotte Hammans	Active			Bond University, Gold Coast Suns Academy	Burleigh, Gold Coast	U18 (2018, 2019)		2019, Prelist	2021, R1	5	0	Raised on Gold Coast
Dee Heslop	Inactive			Southport, Gold Coast Suns Academy, Yeronga	Gold Coast, Brisbane	U18 (2017, 2018, 2019)		2019, #69	2020, R1	45	0	Raised on the Gold Coast from the age of 10
Greta Bodey	Active			Cairns Saints, University of Queensland	Brisbane			2019, Rookie signing	2020, R1	84	69	Raised in Brisbane
Cathy Svarc	Active			Wilston Grange	Brisbane			2019, #16	2020, R1	94	29	Recruited from Brisbane
Taylor Smith	Active			Bond University, Gold Coast Suns Academy	Brisbane	U18 (2018)		2019, Priority signing	2021, R1	85	77	Raised on Gold Coast
Tahlia Hickie	Active			Coorparoo	Brisbane	U18 (2017, 2019)		2019, #28	2020, SF	89	4	Raised in Brisbane
Serene Watson	Active			Broadbeach, Bond University, Gold Coast Suns Academy	Gold Coast	U18 (2018, 2019)		2019, #18	2020, R1	76	2	Raised on Gold Coast from age of 8
Lily Postlethwaite	Active			Moreton Bay, Brisbane Lions Academy	Maroochydore, Brisbane	U18 (2017, 2018, 2019)	U18 (2018)	2019, #3	2020, R1	61	8	Raised in Caboolture
Kate Surman	Active			Maroochydore	Gold Coast			2019, Expansion club signing	2020, R1	77	22	Raised on Sunshine Coast
Tarni White	Active			Wynnum	Coorparoo	U18 (2017, 2019)		2019, #30	2020, R1	72	8	Raised in Brisbane (Capalaba)
Nat Grider	Active			Jindalee Jags / University of Queensland	Brisbane	U18 (2017, 2018 c)		2018, #22	2019, R4	95	0	Raised in Brisbane
Erica Fowler	Active			Yeronga					2019, R1	54	3	Raised in Brisbane
Georgie Rankin	Active			Surfers Paradise					2019, R1	66	2	Raised on the Gold Coast from age of 6
Jesse Tawhiao-Wardlaw	Active			Coorparoo	Brisbane	U18 (2018)			2019, R1	93	92	Raised in Logan from the age of 4
Jade Ellenger	Active			Coorparoo	Brisbane	U18 (2018)			2019, 06	86	10	Raised in Brisbane from the age of 4
Jacqui Yorston	Inactive			Kedron District Juniors, Zillmere, Wilston Grange, Yeronga	Brisbane, Gold Coast				2019, R4	28	2	Raised in Brisbane
Tori Groves-Little	Inactive			Beenleigh Buffaloes, Gold Coast Suns Academy	Coorparoo, Gold Coast			2018, 56	2019, R2	13	4	Raised in Logan
Elisha King	Inactive			Cairns Hawks, North Cairns		U18 (2015)			2019, R2	10	3	Raised Cairns from primary school age
Paige Parker	Inactive	Quandamooka			Coorparoo, Brisbane, Gold Coast			2018, 9	2019, R1	17	2	Raised in Brisbane
Krystal Scott	Inactive			Bond University	Brisbane, Gold Coast					1	1	Raised on Gold Coast
Kalinda Howarth	Active		Gold Coast	Southport, Labrador, Gold Coast Suns Academy, Coolangatta Tweed Heads	Brisbane, Gold Coast	U18 (2016, 2017)		2017, #31	2020, R1	51	29	Born and raised on Gold Coast
Sophie Conway	Active			Brisbane Lions Academy	Zillmere, Brisbane	U18 (2017)			2018, R1	99	60	Raised in Bracken Ridge (Brisbane)
Gabby Collingwood	Inactive			Forest Lake Dragons, Jindalee Jags, University of Queensland, Brisbane Lions Academy	Brisbane	U18 (2016, 2017)		2017, Rookie, 7	2018, R1	12	0	Raised in Brisbane
Molly Ritson	Inactive			Surfers Paradise, Southport	Bond University, Brisbane, Gold Coast			2017, Rookie	2020, R1	9	0	Raised on Gold Coast
Emma Pittman	Inactive		Mackay	Coorparoo, University of Queensland	Brisbane, Gold Coast					10	0	Born and raised in Mackay
Jordan Zanchetta	Inactive			Jindalee Jaguars, Yeronga	Brisbane			2017, 7	2018, R1	13	1	Raised in Brisbane
Jessy Keeffe	Inactive			Yeronga	Brisbane				2019, R4	11	0	Raised in Brisbane
Arianna Clarke	Inactive			Broadbeach, Coolangatta Tweed Heads	Brisbane	U18 (2016)		2017, 15	2018, R1	19	1	Raised on Gold Coast from age of 12
Delma Gisu	Inactive	Torres Strait Islander	Mer Island	Wilston Grange						1	0	Raised and schooled in Townsville
Stacey Livingstone	Inactive			–					2017, R1	77	1	Raised in Queensland
Lauren Bella	Active			Bakers Creek, Bond University, Gold Coast Suns Academy	Brisbane, Gold Coast	U18 (2016, 2018)			2019, R1	72	1	Born and raised in Mackay
Tayla Harris	Active		Brisbane.	Zillmere	Brisbane	U18 (2013)			2017, R1	95	84	Born and raised in Brisbane
Ally Anderson	Active	Gangulu, Wakka Wakka	Brisbane	Zillmere	Zillmere, Brisbane	U18 (2013)			2017, R1	114	10	Raised in Brisbane
Katie Brennan	Active		Brisbane	Logan City Cobras, Yeronga		U18 (2007, 2008c, 2009c, 2010c), 2011, 2013, 2014			2017, R1	81	97	Born and raised in Logan
Emily Bates	Active			Yeronga	Brisbane	U18 (2011, 2012)			2017, R1	101	16	Raised in Brisbane from age 3
Tahlia Randall	Active		Buderim	Kawana, Nambour, Maroochydore	Wilston Grange, Brisbane	U18 (2016)			2017, R1	115	102	Born and raised on Sunshine Coast
Kate Lutkins	Inactive		Brisbane	Wilston Grange, Yeronga	Brisbane	2011			2017, R1	52	3	Born in Brisbane, raised and schooled in Ipswich
Jordan Membrey	Inactive			Carrara Saints, Coolangatta Tweed Heads	Brisbane				2017, R4	39	19	Raised on Gold Coast from age of 8
Shannon Campbell	Active		Sunshine Coast	Maroochydore, Wilston Grange	Wilston Grange, Brisbane	U18 (2013, 2014), Senior (2014)			2017, R1	113	10	Born and raised on Sunshine Coast
Jamie Stanton	Active		Queensland	Coolangatta Tweed Heads	Brisbane,Gold Coast				2017, R1	78	34	Raised on Gold Coast
Aliesha Newman	Inactive	Ningy Ningy							2017, R1	67	26	
Breanna Koenen	Active			Magnetic Island Junior, North Cairns, University of Queensland	Brisbane	U16 (2008), U18 (2012c, 2013)			2017, R1	113	3	Raised on Magnetic Island
Sharni Webb	Inactive		Nambour	Caloundra, Zillmere	University of Queensland, Brisbane	2011			2017, R1	31	1	Born and raised in Nambour, Sunshine Coast
Kate McCarthy	Inactive			Yeronga	Brisbane				2017, R1	42	18	Raised in Brisbane
Sam Virgo	Inactive				Griffith-Moorooka, Yeronga South Brisbane, Brisbane, Gold Coast			2016, 66	2017, R1	29	3	Moved to Brisbane at age 26 and recruited from there
Aasta O'Connor	Inactive		Brisbane	Northshore Jets, Logan City Cobras		2003, 2005, 2006, 2007, 2009			2017, R1	32	4	Born in Brisbane and raised on Sunshine Coast
Emma Zielke	Inactive		Nambour	Morningside, University of Queensland	Brisbane	2011			2017, R1	41	4	Raised in Bundaberg
Leah Kaslar	Inactive			Centrals Trinity Beach, Coolangatta Tweed Heads	Brisbane, Gold Coast	2013, 2014			2017, R1	36	3	Raised in Cairns
Selina Priest	Inactive			Coolangatta Tweed Heads	Brisbane	2011		2016, #98		8	0	
Tiarna Ernst	Inactive		Thursday Island	Manunda	Gold Coast	2017, 2019			2017, R1	29	1	Born Thursday Island raised in Cape York / Cairns
Megan Hunt	Inactive			Boyne Island Tannum Sands	Coorparoo, University of Queensland, Brisbane			2016, 63	2017, R1	14	1	Raised in Gladstone from the age of 5
Shaleise Law	Inactive	Wakka Wakka	Townsville	Zillmere	Brisbane	U18 (2016)			2017, R1	3	0	Raised in Townsville
Kate Deegan	Inactive			Coorparoo	Brisbane					1	0	Raised in Brisbane
Nikki Wallace	Inactive			Coolangatta Tweed Heads	Brisbane					8	0	Recruited from the Gold Coast
Stevie-Lee Thompson	Inactive	Torres Strait Islander	Brisbane	-				2016, 106	2017, R1	97	27	Born and raised in Brisbane to the age of 4, lived in Brisbane from ages 11–23
Delissa Kimmince	Inactive		Warwick	Yeronga	Brisbane			2016 (Rookie), Rookie		1	0	Born and raised in Warwick

== See also ==
- Australian rules football in Queensland
