= QAFL Women's =

Pre-eminent women's competition of Australian rules football in Queensland

- Current season, competition or edition: 2025
- Sport: Australian rules football
- Founded: 2001
- First season: 2001
- Owner: AFL Queensland
- No. of teams: 40
- Country: Australia
- Headquarters: Brisbane, Queensland
- Most recent champions: Southport (2nd premiership) (2025)
- Most titles: Logan (5 premierships)
- Sponsor: Bond University
- Related competitions: AFL Women's; VFLW; SANFLW; WAFLW; AFL Sydney Women's
- Website: aflq.com.au/qaflw/

The Queensland Australian Football League Women's (QAFLW) is the highest-level women's Australian rules football competition in Queensland. It provides elite women footballers the opportunity to play in a semi-professional environment. Many players from this league have represented their state, earned All-Australian honours, and participated in the AFL Women's (AFLW) competition.

There are five senior women's Australian rules football leagues in Queensland governed by AFL Queensland. The second tier of women's football in South-East Queensland is the Queensland Football Association Women's (QFAW), which was introduced in 2017. This competition is designed to allow women who are new to the game to develop their football understanding and skills, and also provide new clubs with an entry point into women's football.

== Clubs ==
=== QAFLW Clubs ===
Club	Colours	Nickname	Home ground	Est.	Years in comp.	Premierships	
Club	Colours	Nickname	Home ground	Est.	Years in comp.	Total	Recent
Aspley		Hornets	Automall Aspley Oval, Carseldine	1964	2019–	0	–
Broadbeach		Cats	Neptune Homes Oval, Mermaid Waters	1971	2026–	0	–
Bond University		Bull Sharks	Bond University Oval, Robina	2011	2018–	2	2026
Coorparoo		Kings	Giffin Park, Coorparoo	1996	2013–	4	2019
Maroochydore		Roos	Neil Upton Oval, Maroochydore	1970	2017–	0	–
Moreton Bay		Lions	Red Rooster Park, Burpengary	1987	2025–	0	–
Morningside		Panthers	Jack Esplen Oval, Hawthorne	1947	?-2012, 2025-	2	2005
Southport		Sharks	Fankhauser Reserve, Southport	1961	2022–	2	2025
University of Queensland		Red Lionesses	Base Architecture Meadows, St Lucia	1956	2013–	2	2022
Wilston Grange		Gorillas	Hickey Park, Stafford	1945	2014–	1	2018

=== QFAW Division 1 Clubs ===
Club	Colours	Nickname	Home ground	Est.	Years in comp.	Premierships	
Club	Colours	Nickname	Home ground	Est.	Years in comp.	Total	Recent
Burleigh		Bombers	Bill Godfrey Oval, Burleigh Waters	c. 1979	2015–	0	-
Mount Gravatt		Vultures	Southside Toyota Oval, Mt Gravatt	1964	2018–	0	-
Palm Beach Currumbin		Lions	Salk Oval, Palm Beach	1961	?-2013, 2023–	0	–
Redland-Victoria Point		Sharks	Totally Workwear Park, Southport	2020	2021–	0	–
Sandgate		Hawks	Taigum Place Park, Taigum	1943	2017–	0	–
Sherwood		Magpies	Powenyenna Oval, Chelmer	1991	?-2010, 2014, 2020–	2	2026
Surfers Paradise		Demons	Sir Bruce Small Park, Benowa	1962	2000s, 2018–	1	2022
Yeronga South Brisbane		Devils	Leyshon Park, Yeronga	1928	2011–	0	-

=== QFAW Division 2 Clubs ===
==== North ====
Club	Colours	Nickname	Home ground	Est.	Years in comp.	Premierships	
Club	Colours	Nickname	Home ground	Est.	Years in comp.	Total	Recent
Caloundra		Panthers	Carter Park, Golden Beach	1973	2022–	2	2026
Gympie		Cats	Ray Warren Oval, Glanmire	1971	2017–	0	–
Hinterland		Blues	G Rae Oval, Palmwoods	1970	2017–	0	–
Kedron		Lions	EK (Ted) Anderson Oval, Kedron	1937	2003–2013, 2016–	0	-
Mayne		Tigers	Enoggera Memorial Park, Enoggera	1924	2021–	0	–
Noosa		Tigers	Noosa Oval, Noosaville	1970	2020–	4	2023
North Shore		Jets	North Shore Multisports Complex, Mudjimba	1999	2019–	0	–
Pine Rivers		Swans	Rob Akers Reserve, Strathpine	1970	2016–	0	–
Redcliffe		Tigers	Nathan Road Sports Complex, Kippa-Ring	1974	2019–	0	–
Sandgate Reserves		Hawks	Taigum Place Park, Taigum	1943	2017–	0	–

==== Central ====
Club	Colours	Nickname	Home ground	Est.	Years in comp.	Premierships	
Club	Colours	Nickname	Home ground	Est.	Years in comp.	Total	Recent
Alexandra Hills		Bombers	Keith Surridge Park, Alexandra Hills	1980	2001–?, 2018–	0	–
Beenleigh		Buffaloes	Dauth Park, Beenleigh	1998	2017–	0	–
Ipswich		Eagles	Limestone Park, Ipswich	1966	2018–	1	2019
Jimboomba		Redbacks	Glenlogan Park, Glenlogan	2000	2020–2021, 2023–	1	2020
Jindalee		Jags	Jindalee Recreation Reserve, Jindalee	1971	2015–	2	2024
Moorooka		Roosters	Alexander Park, Moorooka	1968	2012–2015, 2018–	0	–
Sherwood Reserves & Thirds		Magpies	Powenyenna Oval, Chelmer	1991	?-2010, 2014, 2020–	2	2026

==== South ====
Club	Colours	Nickname	Home ground	Est.	Years in comp.	Premierships	
Club	Colours	Nickname	Home ground	Est.	Years in comp.	Total	Recent
Ballina		Bombers	Fripp Oval, Ballina	1984	2017–	0	-
Byron Bay		Magpies	Cavanbah Centre, Byron Bay	1984	2018–	2	2022
Coolangatta Tweed		Blues	EXIMM Oval, Coolangatta	1962	2014–2016, 2018–2022, 2025–	1	2026
Coomera		Magpies	Coomera Sports Park, Coomera	2009	2026-	0	-
Labrador		Tigers	Cooke-Murphy Oval, Labrador	1964	2021–	0	–
Ormeau		Bulldogs	Ormeau Sports Park, Kingsholme	2008	2025–	0	–
Pacific Pines		Power	McAuley Parade Oval, Pacific Pines	2005	2022–	0	–
Robina		Roos	Scottsdale Drive, Robina	1996	2018–	0	–
Tweed Coast		Tigers	Seabreeze Oval, Pottsville	2009	2017–	3	2025

=== Former clubs ===
Club	Colours	Nickname	Home ground	Est.	Years in comp.	Premierships		Fate
Club	Colours	Nickname	Home ground	Est.	Years in comp.	Total	Recent	Fate
Lismore		Swans	Gloria Mortimer Oval, Lismore	2002	2017–2020	2	2018	Folded after 2020 season
Logan		Cobras	Tansey Park, Tanah Merah	1973	?-2013	5	2010	Folded after 2013 season
Zillmere		Eagles	O'Callaghan Park, Zillmere	1923	?-2017	1	2017	In recess since 2017

== Premiers ==
=== QAFLW Grand Finals ===
Season	Premier	Runner-up	Score	Margin	Venue	Best on ground
AFLQ Women's League
2001	Redlands	Alexandra Hills	6.5 (41) – 1.2 (8)	33 points	–	–
2002	Surfers Paradise	Alexandra Hills	5.6 (36) – 2.3 (15)	21 points	–	–
2003	Morningside	Surfers Paradise	2.7 (19) – 3.0 (18)	1 point	Leyshon Park	–
2004	Surfers Paradise	Morningside	8.6 (54) – 5.2 (32)	22 points	–	–
2005	Morningside	Kedron	7.7 (49) – 4.7 (31)	18 points	–	Debbie Lowe (Morningside)
2006	Logan	Kedron	8.12 (60) – 5.9 (39)	21 points	–	–
2007	Logan	Surfers Paradise	6.13 (49) – 0.4 (4)	45 points	–	–
2008	Logan	Surfers Paradise	7.3 (45) – 6.8 (44)	1 point	–	–
2009	Logan	Western Magpies	8.7 (55) – 1.3 (9)	46 points	–	–
2010	Logan	Western Magpies	7.5 (47) – 4.6 (30)	17 points	Giffin Park	Jenille Pasfield (Logan)
2011	Yeronga South Brisbane	Morningside	8.12 (60) – 7.9 (51)	9 points	Giffin Park No. 2	Kate Lutkins (Yeronga)
SEQAFL Women's League
2012	Yeronga South Brisbane	Zillmere	11.5 (71) – 3.3 (21)	50 points	Giffin Park	Emily Bates (Yeronga)
2013	Coorparoo	Yeronga South Brisbane	5.14 (44) – 6.6 (42)	2 points	E.K. Anderson Oval	Jordan Zanchetta (Yeronga)
QWAFL
2014	Coorparoo	Zillmere	7.8 (50) – 2.5 (17)	33 points	Leyshon Park	Megan Hunt (Coorparoo)
2015	Coorparoo	Coolangatta Tweed	12.5 (77) – 5.5 (35)	42 points	Leyshon Park	Emma Zielke (Coorparoo)
2016	Coolangatta Tweed	Yeronga South Brisbane	5.7 (37) – 4.11 (35)	2 points	Leyshon Park	Leah Kaslar (Coolangatta)
2017	Yeronga South Brisbane	Coorparoo	10.15 (75) – 9.3 (57)	18 points	Leyshon Park	Emily Bates (Yeronga)
2018	Wilston Grange	Coorparoo	5.7 (37) – 3.5 (23)	14 points	Leyshon Park	Kate Lutkins (Wilston Grange)
QAFLW
2019	Coorparoo	Bond University	14.10 (94) – 2.6 (18)	76 points	Leyshon Park	Paige Parker (Coorparoo)
2020	Yeronga South Brisbane	Coolangatta Tweed	8.8 (56) – 1.3 (9)	47 points	Bond University Oval	Jordan Zanchetta (Yeronga)
2021	University of Queensland	Bond University	15.5 (95) – 8.7 (55)	40 points	Leyshon Park	Dakota Davidson (University of Qld)
2022	University of Queensland	Southport	5.1 (31) – 3.6 (24) after extra time	7 points	Leyshon Park	Steph O'Brien (University of Qld)
2023	Bond University	Aspley	10.6 (66) – 2.5 (17)	49 points	Brighton Homes Arena	Havana Harris (Bond University)
2024	Southport	Bond University	8.6 (54) – 3.1 (19)	35 points	People First Stadium	Kaylee Kimber (Southport)
2025	Southport	Morningside	15.9 (99) – 3.2 (20)	79 points	Brighton Homes Arena	Sunny Lappin (Southport)
2026	Bond University	Southport	8.4 (40) – 3.4 (22)	18 points	Brighton Homes Arena	Shannon Nolan (Bond University)

==== Premierships by Club ====
Premiership tallies for the premier women's competition in Queensland (AFLQ Women's League 2001–2011, SEQAFL Women's League 2012–2013, QWAFL 2014–2018, QAFLW 2019–present)

Club	Location	Titles	Premiership years	Establ.
Logan City	Logan	5	2006, 2007, 2008, 2009, 2010	1973
Yeronga South Brisbane	Brisbane	4	2011, 2012, 2017, 2020	1928
Coorparoo	Brisbane	4	2013, 2014, 2015, 2019	1996
University of Queensland	Brisbane	2	2021, 2022	1956
Morningside	Brisbane	2	2003, 2005	1947
Southport	Gold Coast	2	2024, 2025	1961
Surfers Paradise	Gold Coast	2	2002, 2004	1961
Bond University	Gold Coast	1	2023	2015
Wilston Grange	Brisbane	1	2018	1945
Coolangatta Tweed	Gold Coast	1	2016	2012

=== QFAW Division 1 Grand Finals ===
Season	Premier	Runner-up	Score	Margin	Venue
QWAFA
2014	Caboolture	Zillmere	13.9 (87) – 6.9 (45)	42 points	Giffin Park
2015	Zillmere	Caboolture	7.10 (52) – 6.6 (42)	10 points	Ern Dowling Oval
2016	Maroochydore	Yeronga South Brisbane	4.8 (32) – 2.5 (17)	15 points	Hickey Park
QWFA Division 1
2017	Bond University	Yeronga South Brisbane	8.2 (50) – 4.5 (29)	21 points	Leyshon Park
2018	Aspley Hornets	Coorparoo	4.1 (25) – 3.5 (23)	2 points	Leyshon Park
QFAW Division 1
2019	Kedron	Burleigh	6.6 (42) – 5.8 (38)	4 points	Leyshon Park
2020	Southport	Broadbeach	4.3 (27) – 3.4 (22)	5 points	Bond University Oval
2021	Southport	Surfers Paradise	4.6 (30) – 3.2 (20)	10 points	Bond University Oval
2022	Surfers Paradise	Moreton Bay	7.4 (46) – 6.8 (44)	2 points	Leyshon Park
2023	Moreton Bay	Morningside	7.5 (47) – 5.3 (33)	14 points	EK Anderson Oval
2024	Sherwood	Sandgate	5.2 (32) – 4.3 (27)	5 points	South Pine Sporting Complex
2025	Broadbeach	Sandgate	4.5 (29) – 3.6 (24)	5 points	Hickey Park

=== QFAW Division 2 Grand Finals ===
Season	Premier	Runner-up	Score	Margin	Venue
2017	Broadbeach	Kedron	5.12 (42) – 3.5 (23)	19 points	Leyshon Park
QFAW Division 2 North
2018	Jindalee	Sandgate	4.12 (36) – 0.2 (2)	34 points	Leyshon Park
2019	Ipswich	Hinterland	6.3 (39) – 2.7 (19)	20 points	Leyshon Park
2020	Noosa	Hinterland	2.7 (19) – 2.4 (16)	3 points	Moreton Bay Central Sports Complex
2021	Noosa	Ipswich	4.4 (28) – 1.4 (10)	18 points	Lemke Road, Sandgate
2022	Noosa	Pine Rivers	11.11 (77) – 4.2 (27)	50 points	Leyshon Park
2023	Noosa	Caloundra	7.5 (47) – 4.1 (25)	22 points	Moreton Bay Central Sports Complex
2024	Jindalee	Caloundra	5.1 (31) – 4.5 (29)	2 points	Moreton Bay Central Sports Complex
2025	Caloundra	Pine Rivers	4.5 (29) – 1.2 (8)	21 points	Lemke Road, Sandgate
QFAW Division 2 South
2018	Morningside	Robina	2.4 (16) – 1.4 (10)	6 points	Leyshon Park
2019	Surfers Paradise	Mount Gravatt	8.7 (55) – 2.3 (15)	40 points	Leyshon Park
2020	Jimboomba	Beenleigh	4.4 (28) – 4.3 (27)	1 point	Bond University Oval
2021	Byron Bay, Tweed Coast		Not played	–	Bond University Oval
2022	Byron Bay	Tweed Coast	5.4 (34) – 0.4 (4)	30 points	Leyshon Park
2023	Tweed Coast	Ballina	7.3 (45) – 2.1 (13)	33 points	Fankhauser Reserve
2024	Burleigh	Robina	9.11 (65) – 2.5 (17)	48 points	Kombumerri Park
2025	Tweed Coast	Coolangatta Tweed Heads	1.3 (9) – 0.0 (0)	9 points	Kombumerri Park
QFAW Division 2 Central
2021	Sherwood	Jindalee	8.7 (55) – 3.5 (23)	32 points	Bond University Oval
2022–24	No competition				
2025	Mount Gravatt	Jindalee	4.9 (33) – 1.3 (9)	24 points	Hickey Park

=== QFAW Northern Rivers Grand Finals ===
Season	Premier	Runner-up	Score	Margin	Venue
2017	Lismore	Ballina	1.7 (13) – 1.0 (6)	7 points	Byron Bay Sports Complex
2018	Lismore	Tweed	8.11 (59) – 2.2 (14)	45 points	Byron Bay Sports Complex
2019	Byron	Tweed	2.6 (18) – 2.3 (15)	3 points	Oakes Oval
2020	Ballina	Byron	1.6 (12) – 1.4 (10)	2 points	Barry Shepherd Field

== QAFLW Awards ==
=== Emma Zielke Medal ===
The medal is awarded to the best and fairest player in the league, and was named after Brisbane player Emma Zielke in August 2021.

Year	Player name	Club	Ref.
2001	Billy Schloss	Redland	
2002	Monica O'Brien	Surfers Paradise	
2003	N/A		
2004	Marlo Brack	Logan City	
2005	Marlo Brack	Logan City	
2006	Kara Fabian	Logan City	
2007	Sammy Franks	Kedron	
2008	Mica Cubis	Kedron	
2009	N/A		
2010	Jade Pregelj	Logan City	
2011	Jade Pregelj	Logan City	
2012	Tayla Harris	Zillmere	
2013	Kate Lutkins	Yeronga South Brisbane	
2014	Emma Zielke	Coorparoo	
2015	Emma Zielke; Jordan Zanchetta	Coorparoo; Yeronga South Brisbane	
2016	Leah Kaslar; Sam Virgo	Coolangatta Tweed; Yeronga South Brisbane	
2017	Kate McCarthy	Yeronga South Brisbane	
2018	Brittany Gibson; Tori Groves-Little	Wilston Grange; Coorparoo	
2019	Emily Bates	Yeronga South Brisbane	
2020	Belle Dawes; Taylor Smith; Jordan Zanchetta	Maroochydore; Bond University; Yeronga South Brisbane	
2021	Shannon Danckert	Bond University	
2022	Selina Priest; Lily Postlethwaite	Southport; Maroochydore	
2023	Steph O'Brien	Southport	
2024	Steph O'Brien	Southport	
2025	Shannon Nolan	Bond University	
2026	Luka Yoshida-Martin	University of Queensland	

=== QAFLW Leading Goal Kicker ===
Year	Player name	Club	Goals	Ref.
2014	Maddie Protheroe	Coorparoo	53	
2015	Hayley Newberry	Yeronga South Brisbane	52	
2016	Jade Ransfield; Kalinda Howarth	Yeronga South Brisbane; Coolangatta Tweed	38	
2017	Jade Ransfield; Maddison Peeters	Yeronga South Brisbane; Wilston Grange	39	
2018	Jenae Govan	Coorparoo	34	
2019	Kalinda Howarth	Bond University	29	
2020	Taylor Smith; Jamie Stanton	Bond University; Coorparoo	15	
2021	Grace Brennan; Lexi Edwards	University of Queensland; Yeronga South Brisbane	20	
2022	Rachael Vetter	Aspley	25	
2023	Maggie O'Connell; Jess Stallard	Southport; Aspley	26	
2024	Jess Stallard	Aspley	32	
2025	Kendra Blattman	Bond University	40	
2026	Kendra Blattman	Bond University	37	

=== QAFLW Rising Star ===
Year	Player name	Club	Ref.
2013	Tayla Harris	Zillmere	
2014	Maddy Roberts	Coolangatta Tweed	
2015	Marley Beaven	University of Queensland	
2016	Arianna Clarke	Coolangatta Tweed	
2017	Tahlia Randall	Wilston Grange	
2018	Nat Grider	University of Queensland	
2019	Lily Postlethwaite	Maroochydore	
2020	N/A		
2021	Abby Hewett	Wilston Grange	
2022	Ava Seton	University of Queensland	
2023	Ava Usher	Bond University	
2024	Dekota Baron	Southport	
2025	Isabella Levine	Morningside	
2026	Monique Corrigan	Aspley	

== See also ==
- List of women's Australian rules football leagues
