= 2026 QAFL season =

115th season of the Queensland Australian Football League

- Date: 28 March − 19 September 2026
- Teams: 13
- Premiers: Palm Beach Currumbin; 3rd premiership
- Minor premiers: Palm Beach Currumbin

The 2026 QAFL season was the 115th season of the Queensland Australian Football League (QAFL), the highest-level senior men's Australian rules football competition in Queensland. The season featured 13 clubs and ran from 28 March to 19 September, comprising an 18-match home-and-away season over 20 rounds, with a four-week finals series featuring the top eight clubs.

== Background ==
Heading into the 2026 season, the Australian Football League (AFL) announced nine rule changes to be introduced to the competition. As a subsidiary of the AFL, AFL Queensland (AFLQ) closely aligns the QAFL's rules with the national competition's laws of the game. As a result of this, the last disposal out of bounds between the arcs rule was present in the QAFL for the first time. The 2026 season also marked the first time in the QAFL's history without the centre bounce to restart play after a goal or at the beginning of a quarter.

Multiple ex-AFL players also joined QAFL clubs prior to the start of the 2026 season. Two-time Gold Coast Suns leading goalkicker Alex Sexton signed with Redland-Victoria Point after the Suns declined to offer him a new contract. After being delisted by the Western Bulldogs at the end of the 2025 AFL season, key defender Liam Jones returned to Palm Beach Currumbin, the club that he played for when he sat out the 2022 AFL season. Gold Coast's 2025 VFL captain and ex-AFL player James Tsitas signed with the Noosa Tigers for the 2026 season.

Mount Gravatt appointed Cameron James as their head coach for the 2026 season. They entered the season having not won a game since 8 July 2023, having gone winless over their last two seasons. As of the start of the season, their winless streak stood at 995 days. The club celebrated its breakthrough victory in round 1 of the season, when it held on for a narrow victory at home against Sherwood.

== Ladder ==
| Pos | Team | Pld | W | L | D | PF | PA | PP | Pts | Qualification |
|---|---|---|---|---|---|---|---|---|---|---|
| 1 | Palm Beach Currumbin (P) | 18 | 16 | 2 | 0 | 2270 | 1147 | 197.9 | 64 | Finals series |
| 2 | Morningside | 18 | 14 | 4 | 0 | 2119 | 1111 | 190.7 | 56 | Finals series |
| 3 | Surfers Paradise | 18 | 14 | 4 | 0 | 1833 | 1259 | 145.6 | 56 | Finals series |
| 4 | Maroochydore | 18 | 13 | 5 | 0 | 1802 | 1412 | 127.6 | 52 | Finals series |
| 5 | Redland Victoria Point | 18 | 12 | 6 | 0 | 1853 | 1576 | 117.6 | 48 | Finals series |
| 6 | Labrador | 18 | 11 | 7 | 0 | 1626 | 1462 | 111.2 | 44 | Finals series |
| 7 | Broadbeach | 18 | 9 | 9 | 0 | 1491 | 1611 | 92.6 | 36 | Finals series |
| 8 | Noosa | 18 | 7 | 11 | 0 | 1481 | 1667 | 88.8 | 28 | Finals series |
| 9 | Sherwood | 18 | 5 | 13 | 0 | 1430 | 1856 | 77.0 | 20 | |
| 10 | Aspley | 18 | 5 | 13 | 0 | 1360 | 1855 | 73.3 | 20 | |
| 11 | Coorparoo | 18 | 5 | 13 | 0 | 1245 | 1741 | 71.5 | 20 | |
| 12 | Wilston Grange | 18 | 5 | 13 | 0 | 1365 | 2052 | 66.5 | 20 | |
| 13 | Mount Gravatt | 18 | 1 | 17 | 0 | 957 | 2083 | 45.9 | 4 | |

Source: PlayHQ.com
Rules for classification: 1) points; 2) percentage; 3) number of points for
(P) Premiers

== Finals series ==
=== Qualifying and elimination finals ===
| | Qualifying finals |
| Saturday, 29 August (2:10pm) | Palm Beach Currumbin 27.14 (176) | def. | Maroochydore 7.2 (44) | Salk Oval | Report |
| Saturday, 29 August (2:10pm) | Morningside 18.12 (120) | def. | Surfes Paradise 10.11 (71) | Jack Esplen Oval | Report |

| | Elimination finals |
| Saturday, 29 August (2:10pm) | Redland Victoria Point 16.11 (117) | def. | Noosa 13.8 (86) | Victoria Point Sharks Sporting Club | Report |
| Saturday, 29 August (2:10pm) | Labrador 12.16 (88) | def. | Broadbeach 10.9 (69) | Cooke-Murphy Oval | Report |

=== Semi-finals ===
| | Semi-finals |
| Saturday, 5 September (2:10pm) | Maroochydore 11.12 (78) | def. by | Redland Victoria Point 19.14 (128) | Maroochydore Multi Sports Complex | Report |
| Saturday, 5 September (2:10pm) | Surfes Paradise 12.19 (91) | def. | Labrador 8.10 (58) | Sir Bruce Small Park | Report |

=== Preliminary finals ===
| | Preliminary finals |
| Saturday, 12 September (2:10pm) | Palm Beach Currumbin 10.12 (72) | def. | Surfers Paradise 9.9 (63) | Salk Oval | Report |
| Saturday, 12 September (2:10pm) | Morningside 17.9 (111) | def. | Redland Victoria Point 8.12 (60) | Jack Esplen Oval | Report |

=== Grand Final ===
| | 2026 QAFL Grand Final |
| Saturday, 19 September (2:20pm) | Palm Beach Currumbin 15.12 (102) | def. | Morningside 11.13 (79) | Brighton Homes Arena | Report |
