= Robina Roos =

Names
- Full name: Robina Football Club
- Nickname: Roos

Club details
- Founded: 1996; 30 years ago
- Colours
- Competition: AFL Queensland
- President: Tory King
- Coach: Teddy Fenton
- Captain: Jason Winkler
- Ground: Cnr Scottsdale Drive & Prospect Court

Uniforms
Home

Other information
- Official website: robinaroos.com.au

Robina Roos Football Club (nicknamed The Roos) is an Australian rules football club based in Gold Coast, Queensland. The team currently competes in the SEQAFL Div 2.

== History ==
Robina first formed in 1995 as a break-away from the Burleigh Bombers and played its first game in 1996. The first few years were tough as there was a lot of restrictions in place so that other club's players were not poached. Playing against the likes of Labrador, Broadbeach, Palm Beach and Coolangatta, Robina did struggle and only won 2 senior games in its first 3 seasons.

=== 1999 ===
Things turned around with a move back to Pizzey Park, the club secured the services of Brett Thompson from Southport's GCAFL side with a host of ex Southport players and beat all sides throughout the year except for eventual premiers Palm Beach. The Roos played in its first final against Burleigh and beat them to play off against Surfers Paradise in the prelim final. The game went into overtime and Surfers won with nearly the last kick of the game.

=== the state league ===
The season was disappointment in a revamped 16 team comp including Gold Coast, Brisbane and Sunshine Coast sides. The Roos finished last but did manage to beat Springwood, North Shore and had a draw with Caloundra.

=== 2001 ===
The Roos were demoted to AFLSQ second division where they found their feet again and recruited quite well to be once again competitive. The Roos beat eventual premiers Coorparoo twice throughout the season but found it hard to beat Redcliffe and Ipswich. The Roos were well beaten in the first semi final against Ipswich.

=== 2004 & 2005 ===
The Roos won back to back flags by defeating Ipswich on both occasions.

Promoted to First division in 2006 the Roos finished last and again in 2007. Demoted back to Division two in 2008 the Roos lost the 2009 flag to Beenleigh before winning the 2010 flag defeating Kedron 19.11.125 to 13.10.88

=== Home ground ===
Robina were based at Pizzey Park in Miami for their inaugural season in 1996. The club then moved their headquarters to H & A Oval in Merrimac for the 1997–98 seasons and shared tenancy with the Broadbeach Cats. The Roos returned to Pizzey Park in 1999 and remained there until 2001 when the Pizzey Park oval was converted to two rugby fields to accommodate the Bond Pirates Rugby Union club. The club relocated to Sir Bruce Small Park in Benowa and shared tenancy with the Surfers Paradise Demons. In 2003 the club moved to the Scottsdale Drive Oval in Robina and for the first time was based in its namesake suburb.

== Premierships (3) ==
No.	Year	Competition	Opponent	Score	Venue
1	2004	QAFL Div 2	Ipswich	-	-
2	2005	QAFL Div 2	Ipswich	-	-
3	2010	QAFL Div 2	Kedron	19.11 (125) – 13.10 (88)	O'Callaghan Park
