= 2025 QAFL season =

114th season of the Queensland Australian Football League

- Date: 29 March − 20 September 2025
- Teams: 13
- Premiers: Redland-Victoria Point; 1st premiership
- Minor premiers: Palm Beach Currumbin

The 2025 QAFL season was the 114th season of the Queensland Australian Football League (QAFL), the highest-level senior men's Australian rules football competition in Queensland. The season began on 29 March and concluded in September, comprising an 18-match home-and-away season over 20 rounds, followed by a four-week finals series.

== League membership ==
On 31 July 2024, AFL Queensland granted an official licence for the Coorparoo Football Club, which was playing in the Queensland Football Association (QFA), to enter the QAFL in 2025. The former Coorparoo Football Club played in the QAFL from 1941 until the end of the 1993 season, and folded in 1995. The new club was formed in 1996 as the "Treasury Kings Football Club" and was renamed to Coorparoo in 1999.

Coorparoo's first victory in the QAFL came in round 2 (its first game of the season), with a 37-point win over Broadbeach.

== Ladder ==
Pos	Team	Pld	W	L	D	PF	PA	PP	Pts	Qualification
1	Palm Beach Currumbin	18	14	3	1	1852	1086	170.5	58	Finals series
2	Redland Victoria Point	18	14	3	1	1629	1259	129.4	58	Finals series
3	Surfers Paradise	18	13	5	0	1909	1189	160.6	52	Finals series
4	Aspley	18	11	7	0	1585	1323	119.8	44	Finals series
5	Morningside	18	10	7	1	1444	1154	125.1	42	Finals series
6	Labrador	18	9	8	1	1450	1521	95.3	38	Finals series
7	Maroochydore	18	9	9	0	1458	1343	108.6	36	Finals series
8	Broadbeach	18	8	10	0	1439	1344	107.1	32	Finals series
9	Sherwood	18	8	10	0	1393	1442	96.6	32	
10	Noosa	18	7	11	0	1410	1514	93.1	28	
11	Wilston Grange	18	6	11	1	1435	1547	92.8	26	
12	Coorparoo	18	5	12	1	926	1602	57.8	22	
13	Mount Gravatt	18	0	18	0	843	2449	34.4	0	

Rules for classification: 1) points; 2) percentage; 3) number of points for.

=== Win–loss table ===
Home matches are indicated in bold.

+	Win		Qualified for finals
-	Loss	X	Bye
	Draw		Eliminated

Team	Home-and-away season																				Finals series			
Team	1	2	3	4	5	6	7	8	9	10	11	12	13	14	15	16	17	18	19	20	F1	F2	F3	GF
Aspley	MAR -41	**WG** **+81**	X	**BRO** **+33**	NOO +19	**SHE** **+8**	RVP +50	LAB -6	**PBC** **-41**	**MAR** **+18**	COO +20	**MOR** **-33**	**MTG** **+125**	PBC -55	**RVP** **-9**	WG +14	MOR +5							
Broadbeach	LAB -41	COO -37	**MOR** **+4**	ASP -33	**SP** **-47**	**PBC** **-10**	NOO -28	RVP -25	**MAR** **-16**	X	SP +56	**WG** **+58**	SHE +19	X	**MTG** **+131**	MAR +29	PBC +3							

== Finals series ==
=== Grand Final ===
2025 QAFL Grand Final
Saturday, 20 September (2:20pm)	Redland-Victoria Point	def.	Surfers Paradise	Brighton Homes Arena	Match Replay
2.0 (12); 7.4 (46); 9.8 (62); 14.11 (95)	Q1; Q2; Q3; Final	0.3 (3); 2.5 (17); 5.7 (37); 8.9 (57)	Joe Grant Medal: Matt Hammelmann (Redland-Victoria Point)
M. Hammelmann 9, J. Brown, M. Callaghan, C. Cameron, J. Huddy, N. Smith	Goals	M. Patten 3, C. Ellis-Yolmen, H. Fraser, A. Moore, Z. Smith, O. Wood
M. Hammelmann, C. Malone, D. Smith, A. Williams, L. O'Sullivan, H. Hunkin	Best	Z. Smith, M. Patten, C. Ellis-Yolmen, J. Nieass, H. Fraser, B. Woodburn
