= Jade Pregelj =

Australian rules football player

Personal information
- Nickname: The Big Dog
- Born: 22 August 1991 (age 35); Logan, Queensland
- Original team: Yeronga (QWAFL)
- Draft: No. 86, 2019 AFL Women's draft
- Debut: Gold Coast
- Height: 171 cm (5 ft 7 in)
- Position: Defender

Playing career
Years	Club	Games (Goals)
2020–S7 (2022)	Gold Coast	19 (0)
2023–2024	Brisbane	1 (0)
Total		20 (0)

Career highlights
- QWAFL: 2010 QWAFL League Best & Fairest; 2011 QWAFL League Best & Fairest

Jade Pregelj (/prəˈdʒɛli/ "prə-jelly"; born 22 August 1991) is a former Australian rules footballer who played for Gold Coast and Brisbane in the AFL Women's competition (AFLW).

== Early life ==
Pregelj was born and raised in Logan, Queensland and attended Shailer Park State High School throughout her teenage years. She began playing junior football at the age of 10 and joined the Logan City Cobras as a teenager. While playing for Logan alongside future AFLW superstars Katie Brennan and Aasta O'Connor, Pregelj played in five straight QAFLW premierships and was awarded back-to-back league best and fairest honours in 2010 and 2011. She later decided to quit football and enlisted with the Australian Army in January 2015. In a remarkable twist, she relocated to Townsville to continue her military service in 2018 and was reacquainted with a former junior coach and Gold Coast Suns head of women's football Fiona McLarty who convinced Pregelj to begin playing football again.

== AFLW career ==
Pregelj was drafted by the Gold Coast Suns with the 86th pick in the 2019 AFL Women's draft. She made her AFLW debut against Greater Western Sydney in round 1 of the 2020 AFL Women's season and was selected to play in every game of the 2020 AFLW season. She went on to be selected in the initial 40-woman squad for the 2020 AFL Women's All-Australian team for her inaugural AFLW season performance. She tore her anterior cruciate ligament (ACL) during 2022 season 6. In March 2023, Pregelj was delisted by Gold Coast.

A few weeks later, Pregelj was signed by Brisbane as a delisted free agent. She made her Lions debut in round 1, 2023, but was omitted from the lineup the following week. She then injured her ACL once more, ruling her out for the remainder of the season. After a second season on the Lions' list, she announced her retirement from the AFLW. She finished her career having played nineteen games for Gold Coast and one for Brisbane.

== Statistics ==
Legend
G	Goals	K	Kicks	D	Disposals	T	Tackles
B	Behinds	H	Handballs	M	Marks

Season	Team	No.	Games	Totals							Averages (per game)							Votes
Season	Team	No.	Games	G	B	K	H	D	M	T	G	B	K	H	D	M	T	Votes
2020	Gold Coast	42	7	0	1	68	15	83	13	13	0.0	0.1	9.7	2.1	11.9	1.9	1.9	0
2021	Gold Coast	42	9	0	0	64	17	81	20	20	0.0	0.0	7.1	1.9	9.0	2.2	2.2	0
2022 (S6)	Gold Coast	42	4	0	0	13	3	16	4	4	0.0	0.0	4.3	1.0	5.3	1.3	1.3	0
2022 (S7)	Gold Coast	42	0	—	—	—	—	—	—	—	—	—	—	—	—	—	—	0
2023	Brisbane	24	1	0	0	4	3	7	1	3	0.0	0.0	4.0	3.0	7.0	1.0	3.0	0
2024	Brisbane	24	0	—	—	—	—	—	—	—	—	—	—	—	—	—	—	0
Career			20	0	1	149	38	187	38	40	0.0	0.1	7.5	1.9	9.4	1.9	2.0	0
