= Wynnum Football Club =

Australian football club

Wynnum Vikings

Names
- Full name: Wynnum Vikings AFL Club
- Nickname(s): Vikings
- Club song: "We are the mighty fighting Vikings"

2025 season

Club details
- Founded: 1971; 54 years ago
- Colours
- Competition: QFA Div 2
- President: Brenden Hodgkins
- Ground(s): 300 Kianawah Rd, Wynnum West

Uniforms
Home

Other information
- Official website: wynnumvikingsafl.com.au

Wynnum Vikings Football Club is an Australian rules football club based in the Brisbane seaside suburb of Wynnum, Queensland. The team, which first competed in the SQAFA in 1971, currently plays in the QFA Division 2.

== History ==
=== Background ===
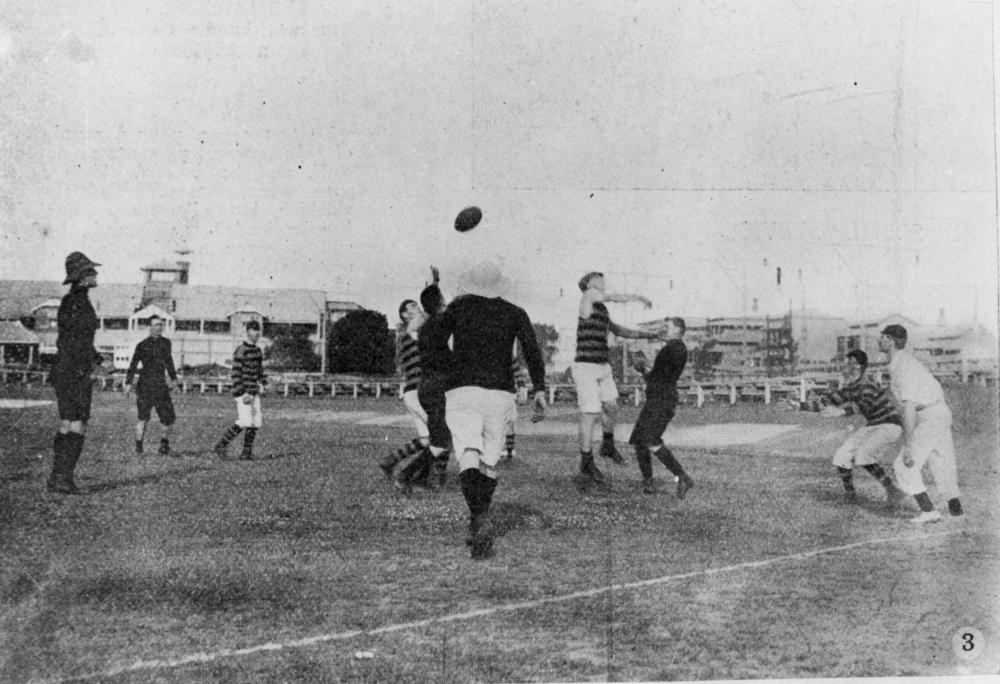
QFL Grand Final at the Brisbane Cricket Ground, 1907. Locomotives defeated Wynnum by 40 points

The first "Wynnum Football Club" had played in the QFL. Based in the Brisbane seaside suburb of Wynnum, the club first competed in the QFL in 1905. They played in the league for 20 years winning premierships in 1909 and 1920. The club merged with the Gordon club around 1910 to become the "Wynnum Gordon Football Club". They also reached the Grand Final but missed the 1912, 1922 and 1924 seasons. Nicknamed the Tricolours, Wynnum wore blue, red and white.

=== Wynnum Vikings ===
Founded in 1971, the club won its first flag in 1974. Wynnum played in the SQAFA, during an era when Sherwood won eight flags in a row. Demoted to Division two in 1992 the club remained there until the reorganization of the competition in 2000. After winning the 2003 premiership in Division Two, the Vikings were promoted to Division One and won premierships in 2008 and 2009. The renaming of competitions in 2012 means that the Vikings are in SEQAFL Division 2.

=== Honours ===
Premierships (5)

- 1974
- 2003
- 2008
- 2009
- 2025 (U15 Div 3),(U13 Div 4 Girls)

=== Honours ===
Premierships (2)

- 1909
- 1920
