= Redland-Victoria Point Football Club =

Australian Rules sporting club in Queensland

Redland-Victoria Point

Names
- Full name: Redland-Victoria Point Sharks Football Club
- Nickname: Sharks
- Club song: "It's A Grand Old Flag"

2026 QAFL season
- After finals: 4th (Preliminary Final)
- Home-and-away season: 5th

Club details
- Founded: 1966; 60 years ago
- Colours
- Competition: QAFL
- President: Ben Davies
- Coach: Phil Carse
- Captain: Mitch Stallard
- Premierships: QAFL: 1 (2025)
- Ground: Scottsdale Park

Uniforms
Home	Away

Other information
- Official website: redlandvictoriapointafc.com.au

Redland-Victoria Point Football Club (nicknamed The Sharks) is a Brisbane based sports club. The Australian rules football team competes in the Queensland Australian Football League (QAFL) since 2021. They have previously been a part of both the AFL Queensland State League and the North East Australian Football League (NEAFL).

Apart from football, Redland-Victoria Point Sharks also has cricket, netball, softball, and fishing sections.

== History ==
=== Beginning ===
Primarily named "Victoria Point Australian Football Club", it was founded in 1966 by Mr Ern Dowling. In 1970 the club changed its name to the "Victoria Point Redlands Australian Football Club". In 1972 a further name change took place and the club was now known as "Redlands Australian Football Club". The club won senior premierships in the South Queensland Football Association Division One – 1998–99 (2 total); SQFA Division Two – 1975, 1987 (2 total).

=== AFLQ ===
Logo of the Redland FC until 2020

In 2000 Redland joined the elite AFL Queensland State League and in 2002 the club formally linked as a sister club with the AFL's Essendon Football Club. The "Redland Sharks" name was exchanged for the "Redland Bombers" and the players wore the same guernsey as Essendon.

Yet to win its first AFLQ premiership, Redland won three wooden spoons from 2005 to 2007 but has been highly competitive since 2009 playing off in four NEAFL finals series, making the semi-finals consecutively in 2012 and 2013.

In 2020, Redland Bombers merged with the Victoria Point Sharks to form "'Redland-Victoria Point Sharks Football Club". The newly merged club joined AFL Queensland to play in the Queensland Australian Football League since 2021.

== Honours ==
=== QAFL Premierships ===
- QAFL (1): 2025

==== Grand Final score ====
Year	Rival	Score	Venue
2025	Surfers Paradise Demons	14.11 (95) – 8.9 (57)	Brighton Homes Arena

==== Joe Grant Medalist ====
Matt Hammelmann (2025)

=== Grogan Medallists ===
- 2001, Paul O'Brien
- 2012, Thomas Salter

=== AFLQ Top Goalkickers ===
- 2001, Paul O'Brien (113)

== Notable players ==
- Charlie Dixon – 185* games for Gold Coast Suns and Port Adelaide Football Club
- Brad Howard – (Saint Kilda, 2007)
- Sam Michael – (Brisbane Lions 2011 rookie)
- Paul O'Shea – (Western Bulldogs, 2007)
- Adam Oxley – (Collingwood 2012 rookie)
- Alex Sexton (Gold Coast Suns 2011)
- Jake Spencer – (Melbourne, 2008).
- Josh Thomas – (Collingwood 2009)
- Michael West – (Western Bulldogs, 2005)
- Ben Keays – 156* games for Brisbane Lions and Adelaide Football Club
