= Locomotives Recreation Club =

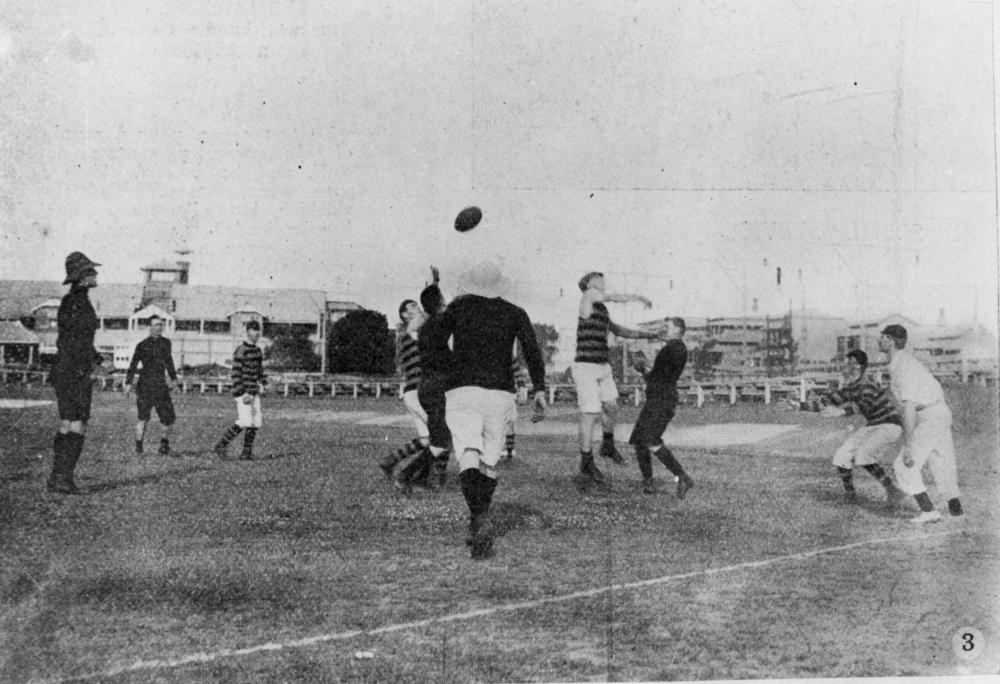
Australian Football Premiership Grand Final at the Brisbane Cricket Ground, 1907. Locomotives defeated Wynnum by 40 points.

Locomotives Recreation Club were an Australian rules football club which competed in the Queensland Football League from 1905 to 1909. They wore blue and black club colours.

Locomotives won back-to-back premierships in 1907 and 1908 but after failing to win a game in 1909 were forced to leave the league.

== Honours ==
Premierships (2)

- 1907
- 1908
