= Valley Australian Football Club =

Valley Australian Football Club was an Australian rules club which played in the Queensland Football League and QANFL from 1905 to 1927. They competed at Albion Park in Brisbane and had dark blue club colours. Nicknamed the Valleys, the club merged with Brisbane Football Club (not to be confused with the earlier Brisbane Football Club) in 1928, competing as 'Brisbane-Valley' until 1931. They again competed as 'Valley' from 1933 to 1936.

== Honours ==
Premierships (3)

- 1912
- 1913
- 1925
