= Caloundra Australian Football Club =

Australian rules football club

Caloundra Panthers

Names
- Full name: Caloundra Australian Rules Football Club
- Nickname: Panthers
- Club song: We’re from Pantherland
- After finals: 2021 runners up
- Best and fairest: Connor Barling

Club details
- Founded: 1973; 53 years ago
- Colours
- Competition: QFA Division 1
- President: Travis Lloyd
- Coach: Luke Henderson
- Captain: Kayne Davidson
- Ground: North Street, Baringa Sports Complex Caloundra

Uniforms
Home

Caloundra Australian Football Club is an Australian rules football club that is based in Caloundra, Sunshine Coast, Queensland. It competes in the QFA Division 1.

Known as the Panthers, Caloundra used to play in a higher division but, due to player shortages for the 2012 season, it can only gather a side for a lower division that does not field a reserve team.

== History ==
The club started in 1973 and played in the Sunshine Coast and Gympie Districts AFL. After winning back to back premierships in 1987 and 1988 the club transferred to the QAFL for the 1990 season.

The switch was not a success as Morningside kicked a record score against them – Morningside 47.28.310 defeated Caloundra 1.3.9.

After returning to the Sunshine Coast in 1991 it won the premiership, and followed up again in 1992.

In 1993, the league shut down and the Sunshine Coast clubs played in the Brisbane AFL. Caloundra lost the 1993 Grand final to Maroochydore by eleven points. In 2000, a major reorganization of football in southern Queensland saw Caloundra placed in division one.

After being runner-up in 2007 and 2008 the club won the 2010 premiership by defeating the Coorparoo Kings 9.16.70 to 7.12.54.

== Premierships ==
- 1987 – Sunshine Coast AFL
- 1988 – Sunshine Coast AFL
- 1991 – Sunshine Coast AFL
- 1992 – Sunshine Coast AFL
- 2010 – AFL Queensland State Division 1
- 2012 – SEQAFL – Division 4 Northern

== AFL Players from Caloundra ==
- Jason Millar – Brisbane Bears (1991)
- Ben J. Thompson – Carlton (1998–1999)
- Nathan Clarke – Brisbane Lions (2000–2002)
- Austin Lucy – Essendon (2006)
- Chris Smith – Fremantle (2007–2008)
- Daniel Dzufer – Brisbane Lions (2007–2009)
- Sam J. Reid – Western Bulldogs (2008–2011), Greater Western Sydney Giants (2012–2013, 2016–)
- Eric Hipwood – Brisbane Lions (2016–)
- Tom Fullarton – Brisbane Lions 2017–2023, Melbourne Demons 2024–
