= Queensland Australian Football League =

Australian rules football competition

- Current season, competition or edition: 2026 QAFL season
- Formerly: List: Queensland Football League (QFL) (1903–27); Queensland Australian National Football League (QANFL) (1927–64); Queensland Australian Football League (QAFL) (1964–96; 2009–); Queensland State Football League (QSFL) (1997–99); AFL Queensland State League (AFLQSL) (2000–08)
- Sport: Australian rules football
- Founded: 29 July 1903; 123 years ago
- First season: 1904
- Replaced by: Queensland Football Association (1880–1890)
- Administrator: Adrian Richardson
- Organising body: AFL Queensland
- No. of teams: 13
- Region: Queensland
- Current premiers: Palm Beach Currumbin (3rd premiership) (2026)
- Most premierships: Mayne (15 premierships)
- Broadcaster: YouTube
- Sponsor: TPIL Lawyers
- Related competitions: Queensland Football Association
- Website: play.afl/queensland

The Queensland Australian Football League (QAFL /ˈkwɒfəl/ KWOF-əl or "Q-A-F-L") is an Australian rules football competition organised by the AFL Queensland, contested by clubs from South East Queensland.

Founded in 1903 it was previously known as the Queensland Football League (QFL), Queensland Australian National Football League (QANFL), Queensland Australian Football League (QAFL) and AFL Queensland State League (AFLQSL), the QAFL is the premier semi-professional competition in Queensland.

Since its inception, more than fifty teams have played in the premiership competition. The premier division currently features thirteen teams from as far north from Noosa on the Sunshine Coast, throughout the Brisbane Metropolitan Area and as far south as Palm Beach on the Gold Coast near the New South Wales border. The league's headquarters is located in Brisbane.

== History ==
Prior to formation of the QFL, a precursor existed in the form of the Queensland Football Association (QFA) between 1880 and 1890. However poor alignment with the Victorian Football Association, a failure to secure intercolonial tests and its failure to rein in the popularity of rugby saw its ultimate demise. Following a decade long hiatus in the sport, Australian rules saw renewed interest during the Federation of Australia and fans in Queensland at the turn of the century regrouped floating the idea of a new competition that would endure in the state.

The Queensland Football League (QFL) was formed in July 1903 at a meeting with 50 present at the South Brisbane Cycling Club and a total of 150 signed on as members. Unlike the previous league which affiliated with the VFA, this new body decided to affiliate with the Victorian Football League. Practice matches were held in August that year in the Botanical Gardens and attracted large crowds and interest. The first premiership was held in 1904 with most games being played at Queen's Park, a sporting facility within the grounds of the Brisbane Botanic Gardens.

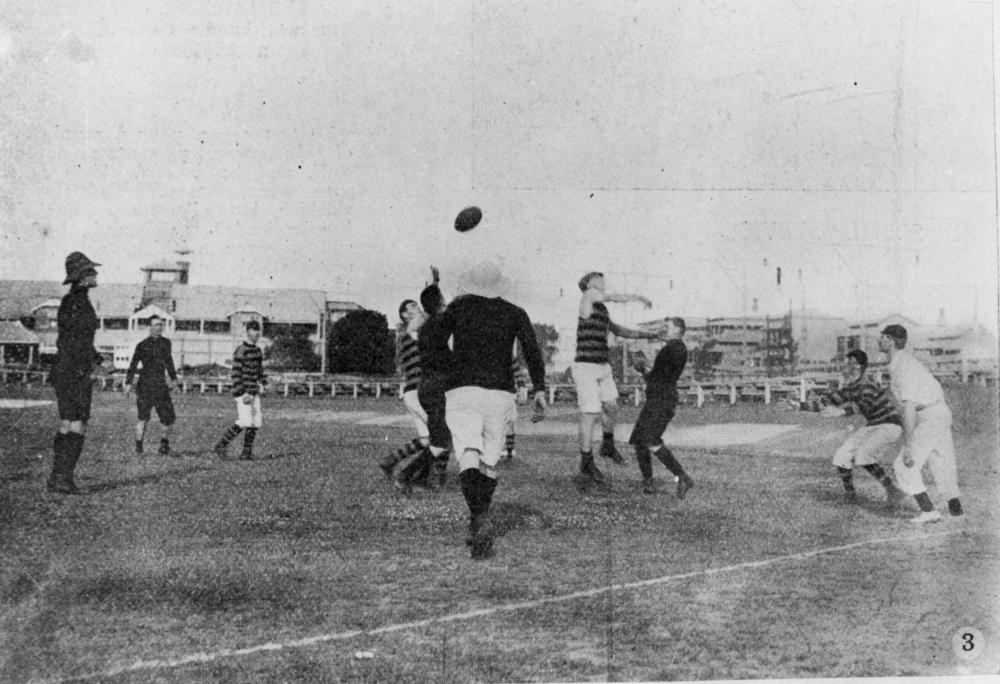
Australian Football Premiership Grand Final at the Brisbane Cricket Ground, 1907. Locomotives defeated Wynnum by 40 points

From 1905 to 1914 games were regularly played at the Brisbane Cricket Ground. Clubs included Brisbanes, Locomotives, Ipswich, Citys, Valleys, South Brisbane, North Brisbane, West Brisbane and Wynnum.

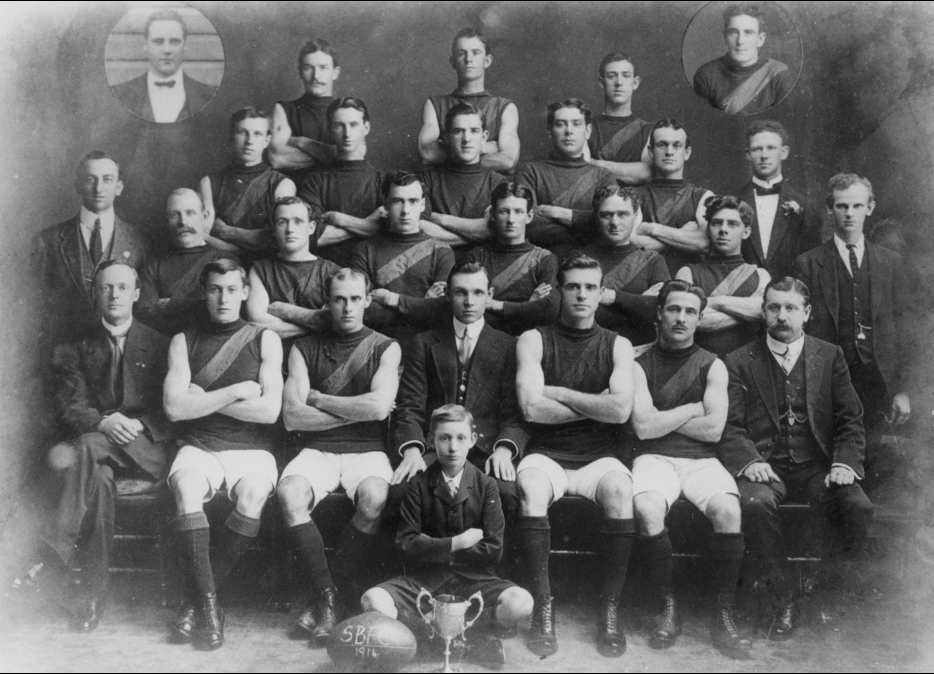
South Brisbane, Premiers in 1914

Between 1915 and 1919 the competition went into recess owing to World War I.

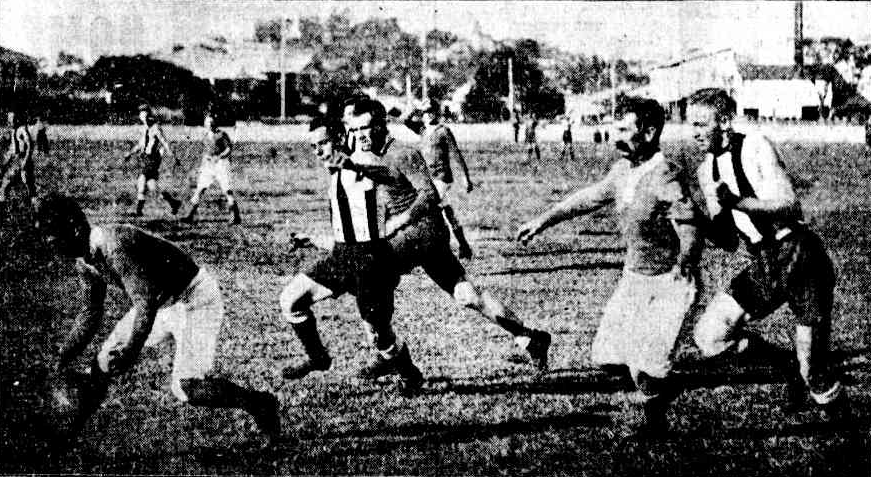
Action from the 1923 Grand Final between Brisbanes and Valleys at Perry Park

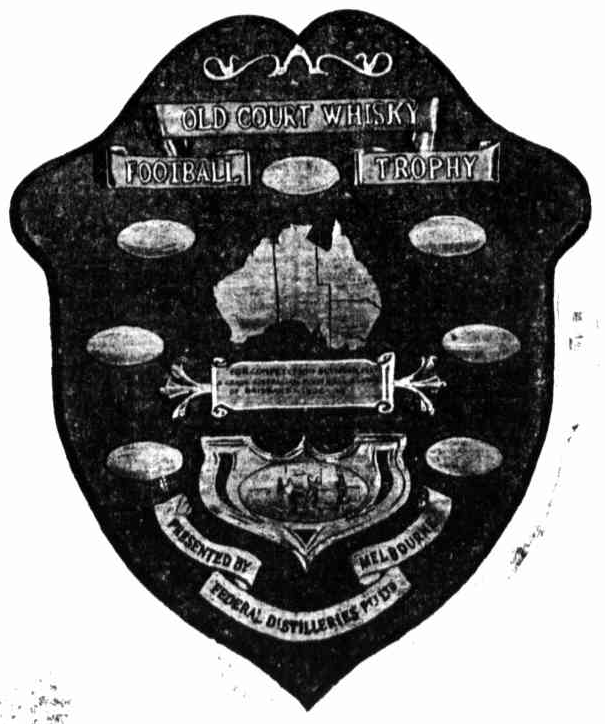
Old Court Whisky Queensland Australian Football Trophy seasons 1926–1932

In 1926 Melbourne brewery Old Court Whisky donated the trophy to the competition. The first winner was Brisbane.

In August 1927 at a meeting of the Australian National Football Council it was decided that each of the state leagues were to include the words 'Australian National' in their names. Accordingly, the QFL was renamed the Queensland Australian National Football League (QANFL) and football continued a steady growth in Brisbane.

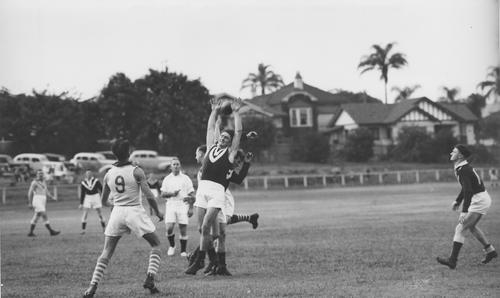
Taringa vs Wests Australian rules football match QANFL match at Perry Park in the 1930s

Yeronga and Taringa fielded senior sides in the league for the first time in 1931, both having an immediate impact and finishing runner up in the years to follow.

In 1964 the QANFL dropped the 'National' reference to their name and became the Queensland Australian Football League (QAFL), a limited liability company.

In the late 1970s and early 1980s, the QAFL saw a boom in popularity, boosted by televised matches it saw crowds of 500 to several thousand attending blockbuster matches, modest in comparison to attendances drawn in traditional football states but significant nonetheless. The QAFL and the Gold Coast league both competed directly with the VFL for local marketshare in 1982.

=== Brisbane Bears VFL licence and QAFL-Cronin Consortium ===
With its popularity increasing, the QAFL began to seek a VFL licence. In 1985 the QAFL had decided that pushing for a Melbourne-based club to relocate to Brisbane. However, after several failed attempts to relocate Melbourne clubs including Fitzroy and Richmond, it soon became evident that the VFL's preference was a new licence.

In 1986 the QAFL formed a consortium with Paul Cronin for a new VFL licence and the consortium won its bid for a new Brisbane based club. However the QAFL fell out with the Christopher Skase backed Brisbane Bears when the decision was made to base the new club at Carrara on the Gold Coast instead of the QAFL's preferred venue, the Brisbane Cricket Ground. The decision would begin a bitter and long protracted battle between the QAFL and the Bears which was not resolved until 1991.

The admission of the Brisbane Bears and to have the club based on the Gold Coast had a huge impact on the QAFL's crowds, with attendances falling from an average of 500 to just 50. Combined with the Bears poor on field and off field performances, the QAFL was severely weakened over the following years resulting in its voluntary liquidation in 1999.

=== 2000: Restructure ===
In 2000 the QSFL was replaced by a new organisation, AFL Queensland (AFLQ). The new premiership competition was called the AFLQ State League.

=== Recent history ===
In November 2010 the AFL Queensland's Premier Division merged with AFL Canberra to form the North East Australian Football League, featuring all of its previous teams as well as the Gold Coast Suns and Brisbane Lions reserve teams in the Northern Conference of the league.

As a result, the QAFL was disbanded in favour of localised competitions throughout Queensland. The structural changes to the North East Australian Football League (NEAFL) competition at the end of the 2013 season resulted in several clubs being relegated from the NEAFL, giving rise to a rebirth of the QAFL. As of 2014, there are 10 clubs who compete in the QAFL, most of which are based in South-East Queensland. After spending the 2021 season in the VFL, Aspley rejoined the QAFL in time for the 2022 season.

== Seasons and venues ==
- 1904–1912:
  Queen's Park, Alice Street (now part of the City Botanic Gardens)
- 1905–1914:
  Brisbane Cricket Ground, Exhibition Ground
- 1920–1959:
  Perry Park, Bowen Hills; Exhibition Ground
- 1959–1971:
  Brisbane Cricket Ground
- 1972–1989:
  Windsor Park
- Exhibition Ground was used for some games including the 1950 interstate carnival

== Clubs ==
The Queensland Australian Football League operates on a single table system, with no divisions, conferences nor promotion and relegation from other leagues.

=== Current clubs ===
Club	Colours	Nickname	Home venue	Former league(s)	Est.	Years in QAFL	QAFL Premierships	
Club	Colours	Nickname	Home venue	Former league(s)	Est.	Years in QAFL	Total	Most recent
Aspley		Hornets	Graham Road Oval, Carseldine	NEAFL, VFL	1964	2009–2013, 2022–	2	2023
Broadbeach		Cats	Subaru Oval, Mermaid Waters	GCAFL, NEAFL	1971	1997–	1	2021
Coorparoo		Kings, Roos	Giffin Park, Coorparoo	QFA	1996	2025–	0	–
Labrador		Tigers	Cooke Murphy Oval, Labrador	GCAFL, NEAFL	1964	1997–	2	2016
Maroochydore		Roos, Maroochy	Neil Upton Oval, Maroochydore	QFA	1970	1998–1999, 2020–	0	−
Morningside		Panthers	Jack Esplen Oval, Hawthorne	–	1947	1948–1950, 1953–	11	2024
Mount Gravatt		Vultures	Dittmer Park, Upper Mt-Gravatt	QFA	1964	1994–	2	2007
Noosa		Tigers	Noosa Oval, Noosaville	QFA	1970	2021–	0	−
Palm Beach Currumbin		Lions	Salk Oval, Palm Beach	GCAFL	1961	2014–	3	2026
Redland-Victoria Point		Sharks	Totally Workwear Park, Victoria Point	–	2020	2021–	1	2025
Sherwood Districts		Magpies	Powenyenna Oval, Chelmer	–	1991	1991–1997, 2001–2004, 2009–2010, 2014–	1	1996
Surfers Paradise		Demons	Sir Bruce Small Park, Benowa	QFA	1962	2014–	1	2019
Wilston Grange		Gorillas	Hickey Park, Stafford	QFA	1945	1945–1989, 2014–	3	1972

Locations of participating clubs from Sunshine Coast
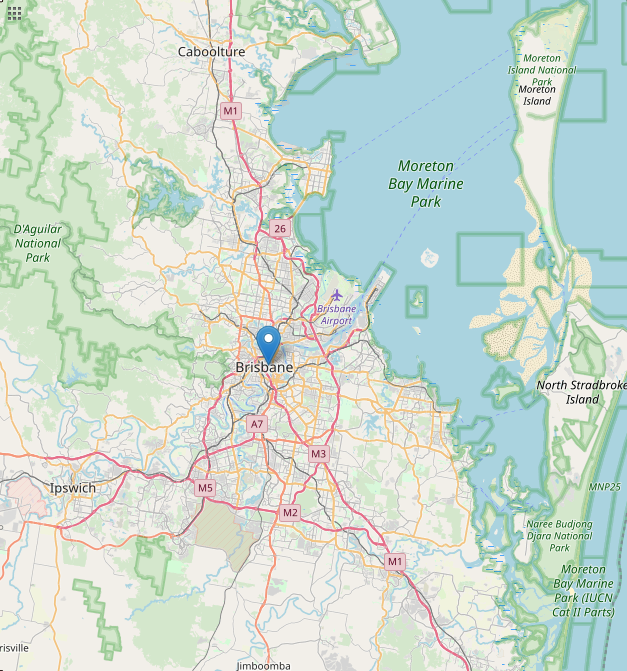
Location of participating clubs from Brisbane
Locations of participating clubs from Gold Coast

==== Uniforms ====
Aspley	Coorparoo	Broadbeach	Labrador	Maroochydore
Morningside	Mount Gravatt	Noosa	Palm Beach Currumbin	Redland–Victoria Point
Sherwood Districts	Surfers Paradise	Wilston Grange

=== Former clubs ===
Club	Colours	Nickname	Home venue	Former league	Est.	Years in QAFL	QAFL Premierships		Fate
Club	Colours	Nickname	Home venue	Former league	Est.	Years in QAFL	Total	Most recent	Fate
Ascot				–		1938–1940	0	–	Folded after 1940 season
Army		Reds	Enoggera Military Barracks Oval, Enoggera	–	1950s	Late '50s-?, 1969	0	–	Recess from ?-1968. Formed SQAFA in 1970
Brisbane (R) (Lion Cubs 1998-99; Suncoast Lions 2004-08)		Lions	The Gabba, Woolloongabba	–	1996	1998–2013	3	2013	Moved to NEAFL in 2011
Brisbane (1)			Queens Park, Botanic Gardens, Brisbane City	–	1905	1905–1908	0	–	Folded after 1908 season
Brisbane (2)		Magpies	The Gabba, Woolloongabba	–	1920	1921–1927	4	1926	Merged with Valley to form Brisbane-Valley in 1928
Brisbane-Valley		Magpies	The Gabba, Woolloongabba	–	1928	1928–1931	0	–	Folded after round 2, 1931
Caloundra (Sunshine Coast 1989)		Cool Cats	North Street Ground, Golden Beach	SCAFL	1973	1989–1990	0	–	Returned to Sunshine Coast AFL in 1991
City			The Gabba, Woolloongabba	–	1905	1905-1913	2	1906	Folded after 1913 season
Coorparoo (original)	(1941-49)(1950-93)	Roos	Giffin Park, Coorparoo	–	1935	1941, 1943, 1946–1952, 1955–1993	6	1986	Recess in 1942 and 1944-45. Merged with Yeronga between 1953–1954. Folded after 1993 season
Coorparoo-Yeronga				–	1953	1953–1954	0	–	De-merged into Coorparoo and Yeronga South Brisbane in 1955
Ipswich (1)	(1906-08)(1922)	Athenians	North Ipswich Reserve, North Ipswich	–	1870	1906-1908, 1922	0	–	Folded after 1908 season, returned in 1922 then folded again.
Ipswich (2)		Cats	Limestone Park, Ipswich	GCAFL	1959	1964-1969	0	–	Formed SQAFA in 1970
Kedron	(1937-48)(1953-58)(1949-52, 1959-81)(1982-89)	Redlegs	Kedron Oval, Kedron	–	1937	1937–1989	7	1980	Merged with Wilston Grange to form Kedron Grange in 1990. Re-formed in QFA in 2006.
Kedron Grange		Demons		–	1990	1990–1996	0	–	De-merged into Wilston Grange and Kedron after 1996 season
Locomotives		Locos, Railwaymen	Queens Park, Botanic Gardens, Brisbane City	–	1905	1905–1909	2	1908	Folded after 1909 season
Mayne	(1946-48)(1949-50)(1951-2004)	Tigers	Keith Beavis Oval, Windsor	–	1924	1925–1932, 1933–1936, 1941–1999, 2001–2004	15	1982	Left QAFL due to disputes during 1932 and 1936 seasons. Excluded from competition in 2000. Moved to QFA in 2005
Norths			Queens Park, Botanic Gardens, Brisbane City and Pineapple Ground, Kangaroo Point	–		1904	0	–	Folded after 1904 season
North Brisbane		Eagles	O'Callaghan Park, Zillmere	–	1991	1991–1995	1	1995	Folded due to financial difficulties after 1995 season
Northern Territory		Thunder	Traeger Park, Alice Springs and Marrara Oval, Marrara	–	2008	2008–2013	1	2011	Moved to NEAFL in 2013
Oakleigh		Dragons	Ashgrove Sports Ground, Ashgrove	–	1969	1964-1969	0	–	Formed SQAFA in 1970
PSCH (Past State Commercial High)	Dark with light-outlined band			–	1941	1941	0	–	Folded after 1941 season
QME (Queensland Meat Export and Agency Company)			Pinkenba Recreation Ground, Pinkenba	–	1905	1905	0	–	Folded after sixth game of 1905 season
RAA (Royal Australian Artillery)				–	1912	1912-1913	0	–	Folded after 1913 season
Redland	(2000-01)(2002-12)(2013)	Bombers	Totally Workwear Park, Victoria Point	QFA	1966	2000–2013	0	–	Moved to NEAFL in 2013
Rocklea			Ground behind Rocklea Hotel, Rocklea	–	1913	1913–1914, 1922	0	–	Recess between 1915-21. Folded after 1922 season
Sandgate	(1948)(1949-90)	Hawks	Sandgate Oval, Sandgate	–	1948	1948–1990	6	1986	Merged with Windsor-Zillmere to form North Brisbane after 1990 season
Sherwood (1)		Magpies	Chelmer Oval, Chelmer	QFA	1956	?-1969, 1983-1987	0	–	Formed SQAFA in 1970. Merged with Western Districts to form West Brisbane after 1990 season
Southport		Sharks	Fankhauser Reserve, Southport	GCAFL	1961	1983–2013	13	2008	Moved to NEAFL in 2013
Souths			Queens Park, Botanic Gardens, Brisbane City and Pineapple Ground, Kangaroo Point	–	1904	1904	0	–	Folded after 1904 season
South Brisbane (2)				–	1910	1910–1924, 1926–1940	4	1921	Recess in 1925. Folded after 1940 season
South Brisbane (2) (Yeronga 1928-60)	(1931-34)(1937-48)(1949-60)(1962-69)	Devils	Fehlberg Park, Fairfield	–	1928	1928-1951, 1955-1960, 1962-1969	0	–	Merged with Coorparoo between 1953–1954. Entered recess in 1961. Formed SQAFA in 1970.
Taringa				–	1920	1920	0	–	Folded after 1920 season
Teachers College		Headmasters, Caners	Kelvin Grove Teachers College Oval, Kelvin Grove	–	1964	1964-1969	0	–	Formed SQAFA in 1970
Toombul-Sandgate (Sandgate 1933)	Dark and light hoops (1933)(1934)			–	1933	1933–1934	0	–	Folded 7 rounds in 1934 season
Uni. of Queensland		Red Lions	University of Queensland Playing Fields, St Lucia	QFA	1956	1956-1969, 2014–2016	0	–	Formed SQAFA in 1970. Returned to QFA in 2017
V Force (reserves only)				–	2008	2008	0	–	
Valley	(1905, 1908-12, 1920-27)(1906-07)(1933-36)	Blues	Albion Park, Albion	–	1905	1905–1927, 1933–1936	3	1925	Merged with Brisbane to form Brisbane-Valley in 1928. Folded after 1936 season
Windsor-Zillmere		Eagles	O'Callaghan Park, Zillmere	–	1962	1963–1990	4	1988	Merged with Sandgate to form North Brisbane after 1990 season
West End			Davies Park, West End	–	1913	1913	0	–	Folded after 1913 season
West Moreton			North Ipswich Reserve, North Ipswich	–	1908	1908	0	–	Folded after 1908 season
Wests			Queens Park, Botanic Gardens, Brisbane City and Pineapple Ground, Kangaroo Point	–	1904	1904	0	–	Folded after 1904 season
Western Districts (Taringa 1931-41)	(1931-49)(1950-90)	Bulldogs	Powenyenna Oval, Chelmer	–	1931	1931–1990	4	1978	Merged with Sherwood to form West Brisbane after 1990 season
Windsor	(1924-33)(1934-35)(1936-62)	Eagles	Windsor Park, Windsor	–	1924	1924–1962	12	1951	Merged with Zillmere to form Windsor-Zillmere after 1962 season.
Workshops				–	1945	1945	1	1945	Folded after 1945 season
Wynnum	(1905-14)(1920)(1923-25)	Tricolours	Wynnum Sports Ground, Wynnum	–	1905	1905–1911, 1913–1914, 1920–1921, 1923, 1925	2	1920	Recess in 1912, 1915-21, 1922 and 1924. Merged with South Brisbane in 1926.
YMCA				–	1911	1911, 1914	0	–	Recess in 1912-13. Folded after 1914 season
Zillmere (1)		Blue Angels, Foxes	O'Callaghan Park, Zillmere	–	1953	1956-1962	0	–	Merged with Windsor to form Windsor-Zillmere in 1963
Zillmere (2) (Northern Eagles 1997-2004)	(1997-2004)(2005)	Eagles	O'Callaghan Park, Zillmere	–	1923	1997–2008	0	–	Entered recess after 2008 season, re-formed in QFA in 2013

== Premiers ==
The complete list of premiers teams is detailed below: In 2010, the QAFL competition was disbanded and its teams became part of the NEAFL Northern conference.
In 2014, the QAFL competition resumed with several former clubs of the NEAFL being relegated to the competition along with several newly promoted teams.

=== Seniors ===
Season	Premiers	Runners-up	Grand Final Venue	Suburb
1904	Norths, Souths, Wests (1)			
1905	City (1)	Valley	Brisbane Cricket Ground	Woolloongabba
1906	City (2)	Brisbane	Brisbane Cricket Ground	Woolloongabba
1907	Locomotives (1)	Wynnum	Brisbane Cricket Ground	Woolloongabba
1908	Locomotives (2)	City	Pineapple Ground	Kangaroo Point
1909	Wynnum (1)	Valley	Brisbane Cricket Ground	Woolloongabba
1910	South Brisbane (1)	City	Brisbane Cricket Ground	Woolloongabba
1911	South Brisbane (2)	Wynnum	Brisbane Exhibition Ground	Bowen Hills
1912	Valley (1)	South Brisbane	Queen's Park	Brisbane
1913	Valley (2)	Royal Australian Artillery	Brisbane Exhibition Ground	Bowen Hills
1914	South Brisbane (3)	Valley	Wynnum Sports Ground	Wynnum
1915	(No competition due to World War I)			
1916	(No competition due to World War I)			
1917	(No competition due to World War I)			
1918	(No competition due to World War I)			
1919	(No competition due to Influenza pandemic)			
1920	Wynnum (2)	Valley	Perry Park	Bowen Hills
1921	South Brisbane (4)	Valley	Brisbane Exhibition Ground	Bowen Hills
1922	Brisbane (1)	South Brisbane	Perry Park	Bowen Hills
1923	Brisbane (2)	Valley	Perry Park	Bowen Hills
1924	Brisbane (3)	Windsor	Perry Park	Bowen Hills
1925	Valley (3)	Brisbane	Perry Park	Bowen Hills
1926	Brisbane (4)	Valley	Perry Park	Bowen Hills
1927	Mayne (1)	Windsor	Perry Park	Bowen Hills
1928	Mayne (2)	Windsor	Perry Park	Bowen Hills
1929	Windsor (1)	Mayne	Perry Park	Bowen Hills
1930	Mayne (3)	Windsor		
1931	Mayne (4)	Taringa	Perry Park	Bowen Hills
1932	Windsor (2)	Yeronga	Perry Park	Bowen Hills
1933	Windsor (3)	Mayne	Perry Park	Bowen Hills
1934	Mayne (5)	Taringa	Perry Park	Bowen Hills
1935	Mayne (6)	Taringa	Perry Park	Bowen Hills
1936	Windsor (4)	Mayne	Perry Park	Bowen Hills
1937	Windsor (5)	Yeronga	Perry Park	Bowen Hills
1938	Windsor (6)	Kedron	Perry Park	Bowen Hills
1939	Windsor (7)	Kedron	Perry Park	Bowen Hills
1940	Windsor (8)	Kedron	Perry Park	Bowen Hills
1941	Kedron (1)	Mayne	Perry Park	Bowen Hills
1942	Mayne (7)	Western Districts	Victoria Park	Herston
1943	Kedron (2)	Windsor	Victoria Park	Herston
1944	Kedron (3)	Windsor	Victoria Park	Herston
1945	Workshops (1)	Windsor	Victoria Park	Herston
1946	Kedron (4)	Windsor	Keith Beavis Oval	Windsor
1947	Windsor (9)	Kedron	Keith Beavis Oval	Windsor
1948	Kedron (5)	Windsor	Perry Park	Bowen Hills
1949	Windsor (10)	Kedron	Perry Park	Bowen Hills
1950	Windsor (11)	Mayne	Perry Park	Bowen Hills
1951	Windsor (12)	Mayne	Perry Park	Bowen Hills
1952	Mayne (8)	Western Districts	Brisbane Exhibition Ground	Bowen Hills
1953	Western Districts (1)	Windsor	Brisbane Exhibition Ground	Bowen Hills
1954	Western Districts (2)	Sandgate	Brisbane Exhibition Ground	Bowen Hills
1955	Wilston Grange (1)	Kedron	Brisbane Exhibition Ground	Bowen Hills
1956	Sandgate (1)	Windsor	Perry Park	Bowen Hills
1957	Sandgate (2)	Coorparoo	Perry Park	Bowen Hills
1958	Mayne (9)	Kedron	Perry Park	Bowen Hills
1959	Kedron (6)	Wilston Grange	Brisbane Cricket Ground	Woolloongabba
1960	Coorparoo (1)	Sandgate	Brisbane Cricket Ground	Woolloongabba
1961	Mayne (10)	Coorparoo	Brisbane Cricket Ground	Woolloongabba
1962	Mayne (11)	Coorparoo	Brisbane Cricket Ground	Woolloongabba
1963	Coorparoo (2)	Mayne	Brisbane Cricket Ground	Woolloongabba
1964	Coorparoo (3)	Mayne	Brisbane Cricket Ground	Woolloongabba
1965	Morningside (1)	Mayne	Brisbane Cricket Ground	Woolloongabba
1966	Mayne (12)	Western Districts	Brisbane Cricket Ground	Woolloongabba
1967	Mayne (13)	Western Districts	Brisbane Cricket Ground	Woolloongabba
1968	Coorparoo (4)	Mayne	Brisbane Cricket Ground	Woolloongabba
1969	Wilston Grange (2)	Coorparoo	Brisbane Cricket Ground	Woolloongabba
1970	Sandgate (3)	Coorparoo	Brisbane Cricket Ground	Woolloongabba
1971	Sandgate (4)	Western Districts	Brisbane Cricket Ground	Woolloongabba
1972	Wilston Grange (3)	Sandgate	Powenyenna Oval	Chelmer
1973	Mayne (14)	Wilston Grange	Keith Beavis Oval	Windsor
1974	Sandgate (5)	Mayne	Keith Beavis Oval	Windsor
1975	Windsor-Zillmere (1)	Mayne	Keith Beavis Oval	Windsor
1976	Windsor-Zillmere (2)	Sandgate	Keith Beavis Oval	Windsor
1977	Western Districts (3)	Wilston Grange	Brisbane Cricket Ground	Woolloongabba
1978	Western Districts (4)	Windsor-Zillmere	Brisbane Cricket Ground	Woolloongabba
1979	Sandgate (6)	Western Districts	Brisbane Cricket Ground	Woolloongabba
1980	Kedron (7)	Coorparoo	Brisbane Cricket Ground	Woolloongabba
1981	Windsor-Zillmere (3)	Kedron	Brisbane Cricket Ground	Woolloongabba
1982	Mayne (15)	Morningside	Keith Beavis Oval	Windsor
1983	Southport (1)	Morningside	Keith Beavis Oval	Windsor
1984	Coorparoo (5)	Morningside	Keith Beavis Oval	Windsor
1985	Southport (2)	Mayne	Keith Beavis Oval	Windsor
1986	Coorparoo (6)	Southport	Keith Beavis Oval	Windsor
1987	Southport (3)	Windsor-Zillmere	Keith Beavis Oval	Windsor
1988	Windsor-Zillmere (4)	Southport	Keith Beavis Oval	Windsor
1989	Southport (4)	Windsor-Zillmere	Brisbane Cricket Ground	Woolloongabba
1990	Southport (5)	Morningside	Brisbane Cricket Ground	Woolloongabba
1991	Morningside (2)	Southport	Brisbane Cricket Ground	Woolloongabba
1992	Southport (6)	Morningside	Brisbane Cricket Ground	Woolloongabba
1993	Morningside (3)	Southport	Brisbane Cricket Ground	Woolloongabba
1994	Morningside (4)	Kedron Grange	Brisbane Cricket Ground	Woolloongabba
1995	North Brisbane (5)	Morningside	Brisbane Cricket Ground	Woolloongabba
1996	West Brisbane (1)	Mount Gravatt	Brisbane Cricket Ground	Woolloongabba
1997	Southport (7)	Mount Gravatt	Keith Beavis Oval	Windsor
1998	Southport (8)	Morningside	Giffin Park	Coorparoo
1999	Southport (9)	North Brisbane	Giffin Park	Coorparoo
2000	Southport (10)	North Brisbane	Giffin Park	Coorparoo
2001	Brisbane (1)	Southport	Giffin Park	Coorparoo
2002	Mount Gravatt (1)	Southport	Giffin Park	Coorparoo
2003	Morningside (5)	Mount Gravatt	Giffin Park	Coorparoo
2004	Morningside (6)	Southport	Giffin Park	Coorparoo
2005	Southport (11)	Morningside	Brisbane Cricket Ground	Woolloongabba
2006	Southport (12)	Zillmere	Carrara Stadium	Carrara
2007	Mount Gravatt (2)	Southport	Carrara Stadium	Carrara
2008	Southport (13)	Morningside	Carrara Stadium	Carrara
2009	Morningside (7)	Mount Gravatt	Giffin Park	Coorparoo
2010	Morningside (8)	Labrador	Giffin Park	Coorparoo
2011	Northern Territory (Club) (1)	Morningside	Ern & Elma Dowling Sports Ground	Victoria Point
2012	Brisbane (2)	Northern Territory (Club)	Leyshon Park	Yeronga
2013	Brisbane (3)	Aspley	Leyshon Park	Yeronga
2014	Morningside (9)	Labrador	Leyshon Park	Yeronga
2015	Labrador (1)	Morningside	Leyshon Park	Yeronga
2016	Labrador (2)	Palm Beach Currumbin	Leyshon Park	Yeronga
2017	Palm Beach Currumbin (1)	Labrador	Fankhauser Reserve	Southport
2018	Palm Beach Currumbin (2)	Broadbeach	Leyshon Park	Yeronga
2019	Surfers Paradise (1)	Palm Beach Currumbin	Carrara Stadium	Carrara
2020	Morningside (10)	Broadbeach	Leyshon Park	Yeronga
2021	Broadbeach (1)	Maroochydoore	Fankhauser Reserve	Southport
2022	Aspley (1)	Broadbeach	Giffin Park	Coorparoo
2023	Aspley (2)	Redland-Victoria Point	Giffin Park	Coorparoo
2024	Morningside (11)	Redland-Victoria Point	Springfield Central Stadium	Springfield
2025	Redland-Victoria Point (1)	Surfers Paradise	Springfield Central Stadium	Springfield
2026	Palm Beach Currumbin (3)	Morningside	Springfield Central Stadium	Springfield

=== All grades ===
The complete list of premiers teams in all grades is detailed below.

- S = Seniors
- R = Reserves
- C = Colts

Season	Premiers (S)	Premiers (R)	Premiers (C)
1904 QFL Season	Norths, Souths, Wests		
1905 QFL Season	City		
1906 QFL Season	City		
1907 QFL Season	Locomotives		
1908 QFL Season	Locomotives		
1909 QFL Season	Wynnum		
1910 QFL Season	South Brisbane		
1911 QFL Season	South Brisbane		
1912 QFL Season	Valley		
1913 QFL Season	Valley		
1914 QFL Season	South Brisbane		
1915 QFL Season	(No competition due to World War I)		
1916 QFL Season	(No competition due to World War I)		
1917 QFL Season	(No competition due to World War I)		
1918 QFL Season	(No competition due to World War I)		
1919 QFL Season	(No competition due to Influenza pandemic)		
1920 QFL Season	Wynnum		
1921 QFL Season	South Brisbane		
1922 QFL Season	Brisbane (1920s)		
1923 QFL Season	Brisbane (1920s)		
1924 QFL Season	Brisbane (1920s)		
1925 QFL Season	Valley		
1926 QFL Season	Brisbane (1920s)		
1927 QANFL Season	Mayne		
1928 QANFL Season	Mayne		
1929 QANFL Season	Windsor		
1930 QANFL Season	Windsor, Mayne		
1931 QANFL Season	Mayne		
1932 QANFL Season	Windsor		
1933 QANFL Season	Windsor		
1934 QANFL Season	Mayne		
1935 QANFL Season	Mayne		
1936 QANFL Season	Windsor		
1937 QANFL Season	Windsor		
1938 QANFL Season	Windsor		
1939 QANFL Season	Windsor		
1940 QANFL Season	Windsor		
1941 QANFL Season	Kedron		
1942 QANFL Season	Mayne		
1943 QANFL Season	Kedron		
1944 QANFL Season	Kedron		
1945 QANFL Season	Workshops		
1946 QANFL Season	Kedron		
1947 QANFL Season	Windsor		
1948 QANFL Season	Kedron		
1949 QANFL Season	Windsor		
1950 QANFL Season	Windsor		
1951 QANFL Season	Windsor		
1952 QANFL Season	Mayne	Morningside	
1953 QANFL Season	Western Districts		
1954 QANFL Season	Western Districts		
1955 QANFL Season	Wilston Grange		
1956 QANFL Season	Sandgate		
1957 QANFL Season	Sandgate		
1958 QANFL Season	Mayne		
1959 QANFL Season	Kedron	University of Queensland	
1960 QANFL Season	Coorparoo		
1961 QANFL Season	Mayne	University of Queensland	
1962 QANFL Season	Mayne	University of Queensland	
1963 QANFL Season	Coorparoo	University of Queensland	
1964 QAFL Season	Coorparoo		
1965 QAFL Season	Morningside	University of Queensland	
1966 QAFL Season	Mayne	University of Queensland	
1967 QAFL Season	Mayne	Morningside	
1968 QAFL Season	Coorparoo		
1969 QAFL Season	Wilston Grange		
1970 QAFL Season	Sandgate		
1971 QAFL Season	Sandgate		
1972 QAFL Season	Wilston Grange		
1973 QAFL Season	Mayne		
1974 QAFL Season	Sandgate		
1975 QAFL Season	Windsor-Zillmere		
1976 QAFL Season	Windsor-Zillmere		
1977 QAFL Season	Western Districts		
1978 QAFL Season	Western Districts		
1979 QAFL Season	Sandgate		
1980 QAFL Season	Kedron		
1981 QAFL Season	Windsor-Zillmere		
1982 QAFL Season	Mayne		
1983 QAFL Season	Southport		
1984 QAFL Season	Coorparoo		
1985 QAFL Season	Southport		
1986 QAFL Season	Coorparoo		
1987 QAFL Season	Southport		
1988 QAFL Season	Windsor-Zillmere		
1989 QAFL Season	Southport		
1990 QAFL Season	Southport	Morningside	
1991 QAFL Season	Morningside		
1992 QAFL Season	Southport		
1993 QAFL Season	Morningside		
1994 QAFL Season	Morningside		
1995 QAFL Season	North Brisbane		
1996 QAFL Season	West Brisbane		
1997 QAFL Season	Southport		
1998 QAFL Season	Southport		
1999 QAFL Season	Southport		
2000 AFLQ State League Season	Southport		
2001 AFLQ State League Season	Brisbane (R)	Morningside	
2002 AFLQ State League Season	Mount Gravatt		
2003 AFLQ State League Season	Morningside	Morningside	
2004 AFLQ State League Season	Morningside		
2005 AFLQ State League Season	Southport		
2006 AFLQ State League Season	Southport	Morningside	
2007 AFLQ State League Season	Mount Gravatt		
2008 AFLQ State League Season	Southport		
2009 AFLQ State League Season	Morningside	Morningside	
2010 AFLQ State League Season	Morningside		
2011 AFLQ State League Season	Northern Territory		
2012 AFLQ State League Season	Brisbane (R)		
2013 AFLQ State League Season	Brisbane (R)	Morningside	
2014 QAFL Season	Morningside	Morningside	
2015 QAFL Season	Labrador	Labrador	
2016 QAFL Season	Labrador	Morningside	
2017 QAFL Season	Palm Beach Currumbin	Morningside	Morningside
2018 QAFL Season	Palm Beach Currumbin	Broadbeach	Western Districts
2019 QAFL Season	Surfers Paradise	Palm Beach Currumbin	Wilston Grange
2020 QAFL Season	Morningside	Morningside	Palm Beach Currumbin
2021 QAFL Season	Broadbeach	Labrador	Labrador
2022 QAFL Season	Aspley	Labrador	Palm Beach Currumbin
2023 QAFL Season	Aspley	Aspley	Maroochydore
2024 QAFL Season	Morningside	Maroochydore	Morningside
2025 QAFL Season	Redland-Victoria Point	Morningside	Noosa
2026 QAFL Season	Palm Beach Currumbin	Morningside	Maroochydore

(R) = Reserves team for AFL Seniors team

=== Premierships by club (seniors) ===
Premiership tallies for the top Queensland football division:

- Team names in **bold** are currently playing in the QAFL.

Club	Titles	Premiership years	Establ.
Mayne	15	1927, 1928, 1930*, 1931, 1934, 1935, 1942, 1952, 1958, 1961, 1962, 1966, 1967, 1973, 1982	1924
Southport	13	1983, 1985, 1987, 1989, 1990, 1992, 1997, 1998, 1999, 2000, 2005, 2006, 2008	1961
Windsor (Note: Windsor and Zillmere are considered to be two separate clubs.)	12	1929, 1932, 1933, 1936, 1937, 1938, 1939, 1940, 1947, 1949, 1950, 1951	1924
**Morningside**	11	1965, 1991, 1993, 1994, 2003, 2004, 2009, 2010, 2014, 2020, 2024	1947
Kedron	7	1941, 1943, 1944, 1946, 1948, 1959, 1980	1937
**Coorparoo**	6	1960, 1963, 1964, 1968, 1984, 1986	1937
Sandgate	6	1956, 1957, 1970, 1971, 1974, 1979	1943
Western Districts	4	1953, 1954, 1977, 1978	1920
Windsor-Zillmere	4	1975, 1976, 1981, 1988	1962
Brisbanes (Note: Not related to the Brisbane AFC (which had dissolved in 1887))	4	1922, 1923, 1924, 1926	1922
South Brisbane	4	1910, 1911, 1914, 1921	
Brisbane Lions (R) (Note: Reserve teams)	3	2001, 2012, 2013	1998
Valley	3	1912, 1913, 1925	1905
**Wilston Grange**	3	1955, 1969, 1972	1945
**Labrador**	2	2015, 2016	1964
City	2	1905, 1906	
Locomotives	2	1907, 1908	1905
**Mount Gravatt**	2	2002, 2007	1964
**Palm Beach Currumbin**	3	2017, 2018, 2026	1961
**Aspley**	2	2022, 2023	1964
Wynnum Vikings	2	1909, 1920	1905
**Sherwood Districts**	1	1996	1991
**Surfers Paradise**	1	2019	1962
Northern Territory Thunder	1	2011	2008
North Brisbane	1	1995	
Workshops	1	1945	
**Broadbeach**	1	2021	1971
**Redland-Victoria Point**	1	2025	2021

== See also ==
- Australian Rules football in Queensland
- AFL Queensland
