= Coorparoo Football Club (1996) =

Australian rules football club in Queensland

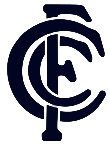

Names
- Full name: Coorparoo Australian Football Club
- Former name: Treasury Kings Football Club (1996−99)
- Nickname(s): Kings, Blues

2026 QAFL season
- Home-and-away season: 11th

Club details
- Founded: 1996; 30 years ago
- Colours: Blue White
- Competition: QFA: Men's; QAFLW: Women's
- President: Sam Haddad
- Premierships: QFA (7): 2000; 2001; 2011; 2012; 2013; 2016; 2022
- Ground: Giffin Park

Uniforms
Home

Other information
- Official website: coorparooafc.com.au

The Coorparoo Football Club, nicknamed the Kings, is an Australian rules football club based in the Brisbane suburb of Coorparoo. The club was formed in 1996, one year after the original Coorparoo club folded.

Coorparoo's men's team previously competed in Division 1 and Division 3 of the Queensland Football Association (QFA), and entered the Queensland Australian Football League (QAFL) in 2025. The women's team currently plays in the QAFL Women's (QAFLW) competition.

== History ==
=== Formation and early years ===
The club was founded in 1996 by Craig Dixon as the Treasury Kings Football Club. Dixon worked at Brisbane's Treasury Casino and was responsible for organising an annual "grudge" match of Australian rules football between the Brisbane Treasury Casino and Gold Coast's Jupiters Hotel and Casino.

In 1996, a number of players expressed interest in playing on a more regular basis, and with Dixon's organising, the Kings were born. During their first seasons, the club played in Division 3 of the Brisbane Australian Football League (BAFL) and played at Yeronga Football Club's home ground.

=== Renaming and QFA success ===
In 1999, after moving the oval that was once the home of the former Coorparoo club, the club was renamed to "Coorparoo Football Club".

Since 2000, Coorparoo have won seven senior premierships, including a three-peat from 2011 until 2013. The club's reserves side has also appeared in grand finals in 2010, 2012, 2013 and 2016.

=== QAFL ===
On 15 December 2023, AFL Queensland announced they had granted a provisional licence for Coorparoo to enter the Queensland Australian Football League (QAFL) in 2025. An official licence to enter the QAFL men's competition was granted on 31 July 2024.

Coorparoo's first victory in the QAFL came in round 2 (its first game of the season), with a 37-point win over Broadbeach.

== Seasons ==
Premiers	Grand Finalist	Minor premiers	Finals appearance	Wooden spoon

=== Men's ===
==== Seniors ====
Year	League	Division	Finish	W	L	D	Coach	Captain	Best and fairest	Leading goalkicker	Goals	Ref
1997	BAFL	Division 3					Craig Dixon; Anthony Prat	Anthony Pratt	Scott Gooey			
1998	BAFL	Division 3					Anthony Pratt	Andrew Hall	Garrett Hall			
1999	BAFL	Division 3					Anthony Pratt	Andrew Hall	Grant Archibald			
2000	AFLSQ	Division 1					Anthony Pratt	Paul Hosking	Paul Hosking			
2001	AFLSQ	Division 2					Darren Kirkpatrik	Paul Hosking	Grant Archibald			
2002	AFLSQ	Division 2					Shane Monk	Paul Hosking	Paul Nickolas			
2003	AFLSQ	Division 2					Anthony Pratt	Grant Archibald	Michael Turner			
2004	AFLSQ	Division 2					Anthony Pratt	Paul Hosking	Paul Hosking			
2005	AFLSQ	Division 2					David Lane	Paul Hosking	Paul Hosking			
2006	AFLQSA	Division 1					David Lane	Paul Hosking	Liam Best			
2007	AFLQSA	Division 1	4th				Michael Gibson	Paul Hosking	Shane Lindsay			
2008	AFLQSA	Division 1	4th				Michael Gibson	Josh Ryan; Joel Henderson; Michael Hewitt; Adam Lewis	Chris Lovett			
2009	AFLQSA	Division 1	6th				Michael Gibson	Josh Ryan	Josh Ryan			
2010	AFLQSA	Division 1	2nd				Michael Gibson	Josh Ryan	Nicholas Joss			
2011	AFLQSA	Division 1		11	6	1	Michael Gibson	Josh Ryan; Ben Cowan	Sandy Hampson			
2012	SEQAFL	Division 2		12	4		Shane Morrison	Josh Ryan; Ben Cowan	Chris Frangos			
2013	SEQAFL	Division 2		13	3		Michael Gibson	Josh Ryan	Ben Gibson			
2014	QFA	Div 1 (Sth)	6th	6	10		Michael Gibson	Josh Lake; Ben Gibson; Chris Lovett	Jack Lake			
2015	QFA	Div 1 (Sth)	2nd	15	0	1	Rory Lake	Josh Lake; Ben Gibson; Chris Lovett	Jack Lake; Ben Gibson			
2016	QFA	Div 1 (Sth)	1st	15	2	1	Rory Lake	Josh Lake; Ben Gibson	Mitch Enright			
2017	QFA	Division 1	5th	10	8		Rory Lake	Josh Lake; Ben Gibson	Ben Gibson			
2018	QFA	Division 1	3rd	11	7		Rory Lake	Josh Lake; Ben Gibson	Jack Lake			
2019	QFA	Division 1	5th	8	8		Rory Lake	Josh Lake; Ben Gibson; Jack Lake	Rory Lake			
2020	QFA	Division 1	5th	3	5		Barry O'Brien	Rory Lake; Sam Holna	Brandyn Grenfell			
2021	QFA	Division 1	4th	6	5	5	Barry O'Brien	Rory Lake; Sam Holna	Jeremy Hirst			
2022	QFA	Division 1	1st	13	2	1	Sam Lake; Barry O'Brien	Campbell Luers; Sam Holna	Ben Hogan			
2023	QFA	Division 1	1st	15	0	1						
2024	QFA	Division 1	2nd	13	2	1						
2025	QAFL		12th	5	12	1						
