= Queensland Football Association (1880–1890) =

Regional football governing body

Queensland Football Association (QFA)
- Sport: Australian rules football, Rugby Union
- Founded: 30th April 1880
- Folded: 1890

The Queensland Football Association (QFA) was the first club-independent governing body for football in the Colony of Queensland founded on 30 April 1880. Its role was primarily to facilitate club and representative matches primarily in Australian rules football but also in Rugby union and occasionally soccer.

It primarily provided governance for Australian rules football in Queensland (the code was first introduced to the colony in 1866 by the Brisbane Football Club), however did not govern outright and as per its affiliation to the Victorian Football Association (which had begun with its member clubs in 1877). All decisions on the game's rules were referred to this body as a result, the clubs were known as Victorian Association clubs, and would play under Victorian Association or "Association Football" rules. 900 Queensland Victorian association footballers were members in 1884. The QFA was the second club competition formed in Queensland (after the Toowoomba Association which formed in 1876) and fifth in Australia (after the South Australian Football Association, Victorian Football Association and the Tasmanian Football Association with the New South Wales Football Association formed in August of the same year).

The QFA governed representative matches against New South Wales, the premier Australian Rules and Rugby Union competitions, and the Brisbane school's competition. However, a growing number of clubs outside of Brisbane became increasingly resentful at the Brisbane-centric organisation (representative sides were selected from member clubs and not the whole colony and rules were governed from Melbourne) and the lack of any colony-wide governing body which led to clubs increasingly switching to rugby (which was introduced to the colony in 1876).

Rugby at the time of the QFA's founding was in disarray, with Rangers Football Club (1876–1878) and Bonnet Rouge Football Club (1876–1878) folding two seasons earlier, however many of Brisbane and Wallaroos best players preferred to play both codes so rugby matches were facilitated during the season on a Saturday every 4 weeks. 80 rugby footballers broke away in 1883 to form the Northern Rugby Union (NRU) to facilitate regular representative matches against New South Wales.

While some clubs occasionally played association football, the QFA did not recognise Anglo/British football matches, which were becoming increasingly popular, generally speaking these players refused to play either Victorian Association or Rugby rules, leading to the formation of the Anglo-Queensland Football Association in Brisbane, in 1884.

The Queensland Football Association folded after just a decade of operation, primarily due to the growing schism between the football clubs.

== History ==
A meeting was held on 30 April 1880 at the Queen's Hotel for the purpose of forming the Queensland Football Association (QFA) to affiliate with the Victorian Football Association. The formation was opposed by the premier Queensland club, the Brisbane Football Club, through its representative E.C. Binge, believing that it had the right to govern itself and use its position of influence to lead the other clubs. However, his motion lapsed and the formation proceeded.

In an effort to uphold Victorian Rules, and frustrated with a lack of governance from Melbourne, a motion was passed by the Association secretary that effectively barred players found to be playing rugby from playing at a Victorian Rules club. The move was to backfire as the breakaway Northern Rugby Union (NRU) formed, taking disgruntled clubs and players with it. These clubs in response, instituted the barring of rugby players from playing Victorian rules and Rugby players and officials began derogatively reverting to the term "Melbourne Association" and "Melbourne Rules" in reference to the QFA and rules fuelling a sentiment of it being increasingly anti-rugby and anti-Queensland.

The QFA was criticised for its lack of a player transfer system. The situation in 1886 became farcical, in which players had begun to freely change to winning clubs week to week, and would even switch codes without accountability from the governing body.

The QFA was under heavy fire for its neglect in Australian Football in 1890 with clubs increasingly folding it had prepared no formal fixture for the season. It disbanded at the end of the season as the majority of its member clubs all folded and joined the ranks of rugby and soccer.

=== Legacy ===
The QFA's demise led to the widespread adoption of rugby across the colony, and it became the dominant sport for more than a century. However, following a decade long hiatus, Australian rules saw renewed interest during the Federation of Australia and fans in Queensland at the turn of the century regrouped floating the idea of a new competition that would endure in the state. The Queensland Football League (QFL) was formed in July 1903.

In 2014, AFL Queensland created a new competition called Queensland Football Association (QFA) which as its lowest non-amateur division. While it shares the same name, the current competition has no connection to the historic competition.

== Administration ==
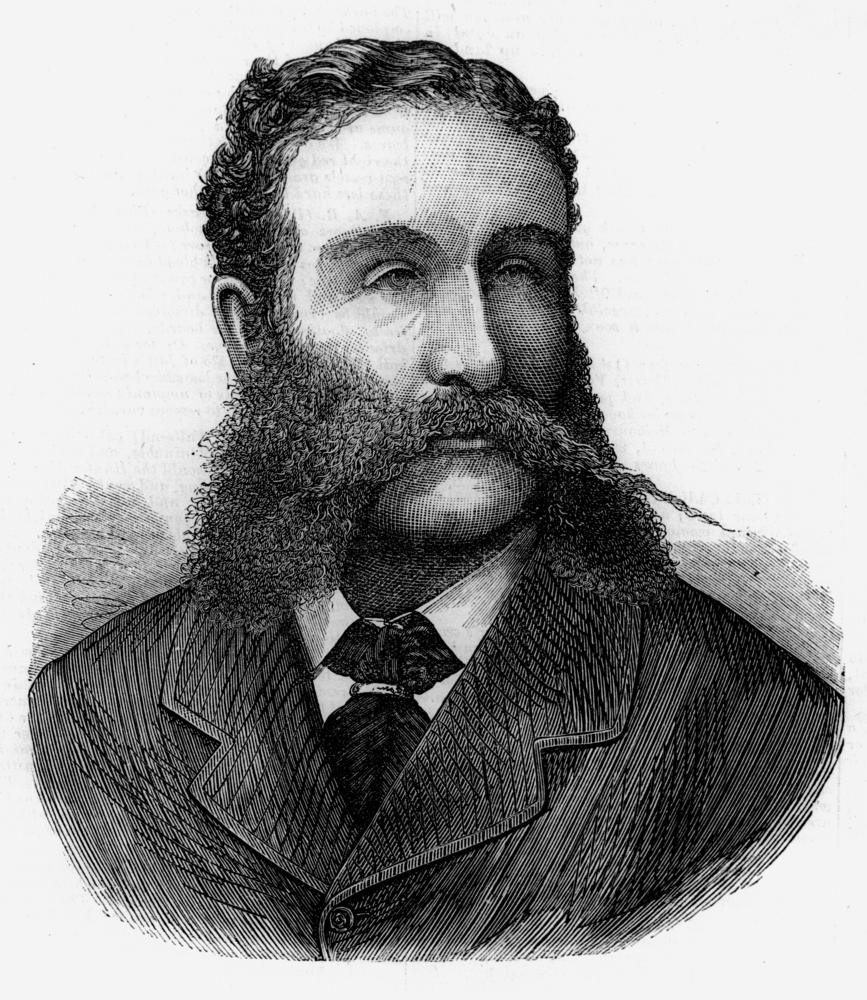
Sir Joshua Peter Bell was the first elected president of the Queensland Football Association

- J. P. Bell (president 1880–1881); A. H. Palmer (VP 1880–); S. W. Griffith (VP 1880–)

== Australian Rules Football ==
=== Clubs ===
- Brisbane Football Club (1866–1887) (formed 1866) (1880–1887) (also known as the "Reds")
- Civil Service Football Club (formed 1866) (1880–)
- Volunteer Artillery (formed 1867) (1880–) (may have begun as a soccer club before switching to Victorian association)
- Ipswich Football Club (formed 1870) (1880-1890)
- Excelsior Football Club (formed 1878) (1880–)
- Wallaroos Football Club (formed 1878) (1880–1885) (also known as the "Marsupials" switched to NRU in 1885)
- Athenians Football Club (Ipswich) (formed 1879) (1880–)
- Rover Football Club (formed 1882) (1882-1890)
- Union Football Club (formed 1885) (1885–)
- South Brisbane Football Club (formed 1886) (1887-1889)
- Kangaroo Point Football Club (1888-1890)
- Valley Football Club (1889-1890)
- City Football Club (1890)

==== School clubs ====
These clubs initially played Australian Rules before breaking away to form the grammar schools rugby competition in 1887.

- Brisbane Grammar School Football Club
- Ipswich Grammar School Football Club
- Toowoomba Grammar School Football Club

=== Affiliate (Regional) Clubs ===
Representatives of clubs outside of the main competition area (Brisbane and Ipswich) were granted representation by proxy in 1883. Regional clubs were by this time beginning to form their own local associations.

These clubs included:

==== Wide-Bay Burnett Association ====
- Gympie Football Club (1882)
- One-Mile Football Club (1883)
- Maryborough Football Club (1883)

==== Darling Downs Association (formerly the Toowoomba Football Association formed 1876) ====
- Warwick Football Club (1883)
- Toowoomba Football Club (1883)
- Allora Football Club (1883)

==== Charters Towers Association ====
- Millchester (1885)
- Charters Towers (1886)

=== Champion of the Colony (Premiers) ===
The Champion of the Colony was awarded by the QFA, it became the Alfred Shaw Cup (named for Alfred Shaw in 1882). The cup was awarded to any team undefeated in 9 consecutive Victorian Rules matches.

Year	Club
1800	Ipswich FC
1881	Brisbane FC
1882	Wallaroo FC
1883	
1884	
1885	
1886	Brisbane FC
1887	Ipswich FC
1888	
1889	
1890	N/A competition dissolved

=== Intercolonial Tests ===
Date	Location	Result	Attendance
20 August 1884	Queens Park	Queensland drew New South Wales	300
30 August 1884	Albert Sports Ground	Queensland 3 defeated New South Wales 2	2,000
19 June 1886	Sydney Cricket Ground	New South Wales 4 defeated Queensland 1	1,200
26 June 1886	Sydney Cricket Ground	New South Wales 9 defeated Queensland 1	1,000

== Rugby ==
=== Clubs ===
Rugby matches were played every fourth Saturday by interested clubs. These clubs included:

- Brisbane Football Club (folded 1887) (Played occasional matches in rugby)
- Wallaroo Football Club (1878-1890) formed under Victorian rules played under both Victorian rules and rugby from 1880, had enough players to field two teams, became a rugby only club in 1885 last record of the rugby club's existence is in 1897
