= Sandgate Football Club =

Sandgate Hawks

Names
- Full name: Sandgate Hawks Sporting Club
- Nickname(s): Hawks

Club details
- Founded: 1943; 82 years ago
- Colours
- Competition: Queensland Australian Football League

Uniforms
Home

Other information
- Official website: sandgatehawks.com.au

The Sandgate Hawks Sporting Club is an Australian rules football and netball club located in the Brisbane suburb of Taigum. They were nicknamed both the Hawks and Sea Hawks and their club colours were bottle green and red. The football squad plays in the Queensland Australian Football League.

== History ==
A QANFL club for Sandgate was proposed as early as March 1933 with at least four local schools taking up the code. Sandgate was founded in 1933 and joined the QANFL that year but would continue for only one season before going dormant.

Sandgate didn't play senior football again until 1943, and entered to play Senior football in 1944. They competed in every season until 1991 before merging with Windsor-Zillmere to form "The Northern Eagles". Due to fall outs between the administrators of Sandgate and Windsor Zillmere, Sandgate split from the arrangement and returned to play as a member of the now defunct Brisbane Football League winning back to back premierships in 1993 and 1994. Sandgate's most successful era was the 1970s when they won four premierships and participated in the finals of every season.

A revamped club, Sandgate AFC, currently competes in the Pineapple Hotel Cup division of the Queensland State Football League (QSFL)

Brisbane Lions ruckman Jamie Charman is the club's number one ticket holder. Jamie played juniors for the Sandgate Hawks for more than ten seasons.

== Honours ==
=== Club ===
- Queensland Australian Football League (6): 1956, 1957, 1970, 1971, 1974, 1979
- BAFL (2): 1993, 1994
- QFA Div 2 North (1): 2024

=== Individual ===
Grogan Medalists (2)

- Edgar Stevens 1950
- Don Smith 1973,1979

AFLQ Team Of The Century (3)

- Dick Verdon - Full back
- Don Smith - Centre half back
- John Stackpoole - Half forward flank
  - All time greats*
