= Sir Bruce Small Park =

Sporting facility in Benowa, Queensland

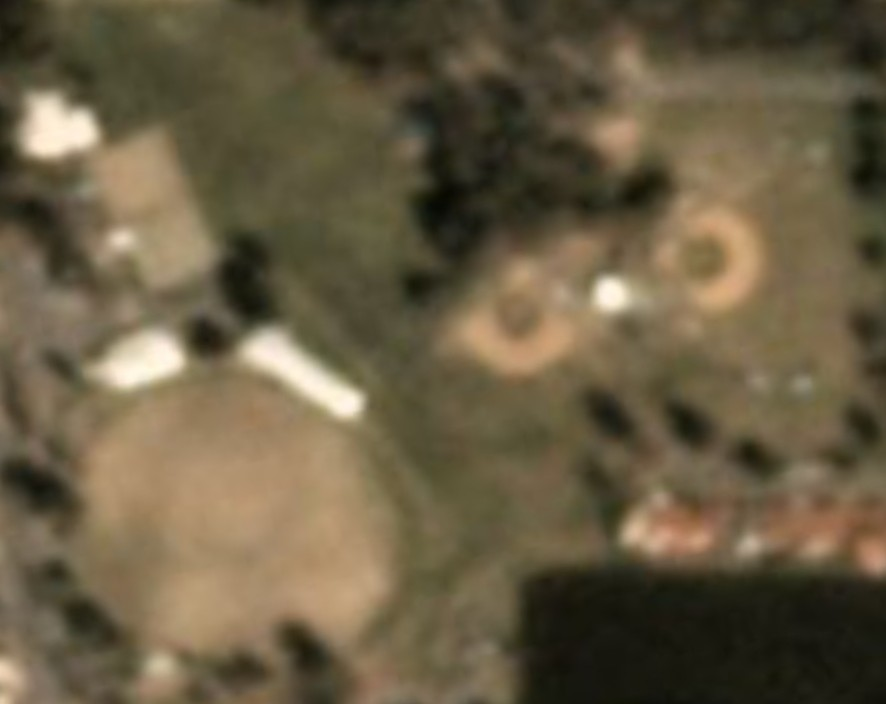
- Interactive map of Sir Bruce Small Park
- Location: St Kevins Avenue, Benowa, Queensland
- Coordinates: 28.005841°S 153.396014°E
- Owner: Gold Coast City Council
- Capacity: 500
- Surface: Grass

Tenants
- Surfers Paradise Baseball Club; Surfers Paradise Australian Football Club; Surfers Paradise Benowa Cricket Club; Benowa Bowls Club

Sir Bruce Small Park is a sporting facility located in Benowa, a suburb of the Gold Coast, Queensland in Australia. Its baseball facilities are home to the Surfers Paradise Baseball Club, current premiers of the Greater Brisbane League. It has hosted many high-profile Australian baseball events such as the Masters Games and University Games.

The adjacent oval is home to the Surfers Paradise-Benowa Cricket Club and Surfers Paradise Australian Football Club, which plays in the QAFL.

It is named after former Gold Coast mayor Sir Bruce Small.

== See also ==
- Sports on the Gold Coast, Queensland
