= South East Suns Australian Football Club =

South East Suns AFC

Names
- Full name: South East Suns Australian Football Club
- Nickname(s): Suns

2016 season

Club details
- Founded: 2014 (Suns); 1976–2014 (Cobras); 1973–1976 (Woodpeckers)
- Colours: Red Gold Blue
- Competition: Queensland Amateur Football Association (A)
- President: Shane Baulderstone
- Coach: David Sloan
- Ground(s): Tansey Park, Tanah Merah

Other information
- Official website: South East Suns website

South East Australian Football Club (nicknamed The Suns) is a Brisbane based club competing in the Queensland Amateur Football Association 'A' competition fielding Seniors & Reserves teams. Previously they were known as the Logan City Australian Football Club (nicknamed The Cobras).

== Formation ==
The South East Suns were officially born on 1 August 2014 after officials from the Logan City Cobras and Beenleigh Buffaloes Football Clubs had come together during 2014 to discuss the possibility of merging forces to become one club for the South East QLD region. The main concern for both parties was the lack of juniors progressing up to the senior ranks due to both clubs not having an colts side. Due to this, both clubs juniors had sort opportunities elsewhere and rarely did these players come back to their clubs at senior level. Because of this it meant that both clubs were continually competing against each other for players. Furthermore, as both clubs were located in the heart of Logan it was viewed that they should be playing a higher level of competition and their aim is to progress up the levels in the years to come whilst having an Under 19's side who would feed into their Seniors & Reserves teams and providing the opportunity for their youth players to hopefully progress to the AFL level.

Prior to announcing their new name an exhaustive consultation process was held between both the Logan & Beenleigh officials as to what their new entity would be called. All agreed that aligning themselves to AFL club Gold Coast Suns was a positive move seeing as they too were a fairly new club and only located a short drive down the road. Furthermore, they would be the only club in the Sunshine Coast, Brisbane and Gold Coast areas that had the Suns moniker and would appeal to those that followed Gold Coast and the AFL in general. After liaising with the Gold Coast Suns they gained approval to use their colours of red, gold and blue and adopting their club song.

After numerous discussions it was decided by the members of the Logan City Cobras at a Special General Meeting that in the best interests of football in Logan and surrounding areas that the Cobras would cease and the South East Suns would become their new club. After holding their own Special General Meeting the Beenleigh Buffaloes decided against ceasing as a senior club and to remain as their own club. Whilst they were disappointed they didn't join forces with the then Logan City Cobras to become one club for the South East QLD region they understood their position but they proceeded to continue on as the new entity 'South East Suns.'

A critical element of building their football club was establishing and maintaining a community connection. Its promise remains to ensure that the club will have meaningful engagement with the community and their pathway ensures that the South East Suns will become a competitive and successful club for the South East QLD region.

Not one to forgot where they came from they decided to honour both the Logan City and Beenleigh Football clubs by maintaining their history that goes back to 1973 when the Woodridge Woodpeckers were formed. Since that time numerous name changes have occurred with the Slacks Creek Cobras, Beenleigh Cobras, Logan City Cobras and finally the Beenleigh Buffaloes forming their own club in 1998. All games, club, league and life membership honours are recognised by them (for those that join the Suns) as they are a club for the South East QLD region.

The South East Suns are building a reputation as one of the most exciting football clubs in Australia. Strong values and a culture of success both on and off the field are central to achieving this goal.

== History ==
1973–1976: Woodridge Woodpeckers (Ewing Road – Woodridge) Guernsey : Brown & Blue

1976–1977: Slacks Creek Cobra's (Paradise Road – Slacks Creek) Guernsey : Plain Red & Green Trims

1978–1979: Beenleigh Cobra's (Show Grounds – Beenleigh) Guernsey : Plain Red & Green Trims Winners Third Division Senior Premiership (1978)

1980–1990: Beenleigh Cobra's (Alexander Clarke Park – Loganholme) Guernsey : Red with 1 Green Hoop & 2 White Hoops around the middle(1986–89), St. Kilda's colours were used in 1990. Winners Second Division Senior Premiership (1980 & 1985). Reserve Grade Senior Premiership (1981). Junior Sides Fielded in 1984 After winning premiership in BAFL we played in Gold Coast Competition (1986–1990)

1991–1997: Logan City Cobra's (Alexander Clarke Park – Loganholme) Guernsey : Red with 1 Green Hoop & 2 White Hoops around the middle, Returned to Brisbane Competition (1991) Minor Premiers Second Division Senior (1991) Winners Second Division Reserve Grade Premiership (1993).

1998 – present: Logan City Cobra's (Tansey Park – Tanah Merah ) Guernsey : Red & Green

1999: Third Division Team reintroduced to Seniors.

2002: Second Division Reserve Grand Finalists.

2003: Seniors play-off in finals for first time in 8 years losing preliminary final.

2004: Seniors loss elimination final, reserve grade lose preliminary final.

2006: Seniors and Reserves play-off in grand final, both teams finish runners-up for the season in AFLQ State Association Division 2.

2007: Club fields one side in AFLQ State Association Division 3. Team makes grand final, finishes runners-up.

2008: Club is promoted back to AFLQ State Association Division 2 (Seniors & Reserves). New era arrives at the club with the return of many former players and committee members to assist in the rebuilding phase. New modern looking guernsey is also implemented with an update to the previous Cobras logo.

2009: Seniors drastically improve from 2008 as do the Reserves who just miss out on a finals berth.

2010: Club takes another leap forward in the re-building phase. Both the Seniors & Reserves make the finals in Div 2 for the first time since 2006. The Seniors finish fifth and put in a gallant effort in the Elimination Final to only be beaten by 11 points away against Caboolture. The Reserves finish the home and away season in second but lose to Kedron in the Qualifying Final and the UQ Red Lions in the semi-final both by a heart breaking 3 points.

2011: Seniors make the Grand Final for the first time since 2006 in Division 2. They finish Minor Premiers, only to be defeated at the last hurdle by Nambour & Hinterland. Reserves finish the season in 5th and make it to the semi-finals, only to go down to Caboolture.

2012: AFL Queensland State Association Division 2 renamed to the South East Queensland Australian Football League (SEQAFL) Division 3. Seniors finish the home and away season in 5th and put in a fantastic effort in the finals to reach the Grand Final for the 2nd consecutive year. They just fall short of premiership glory by a heartbreaking 4 points. The Reserves finish in 7th spot just a couple of games short of a finals berth.

2013: The Club celebrates 40 years since first forming as the Woodridge Woodpeckers in 1973. Seniors finish in 4th spot and just go down to the Pine Rivers Swans by 17 points in the first semi final. Reserves just miss out on a finals spot by finishing in 5th.

AFL Queensland announce a major restructure to all SEQAFL competitions in September 2013. They join the newly named Queensland Amateur Football Association (QAFA) in the 'A' Division for the 2014 season.

2014: The Logan City Cobras play their final season before changing to their new entity – South East Suns.

2015: Seniors finish the home and away season in 3rd. Play-off in the grand final against the Bond University Bullsharks but finish the season runners-up. Reserves also finish the home and away season in 3rd but bow out of the finals in straight sets.

2016: Seniors finally break the 31-year drought and take out the Premiership by going through the season undefeated. They defeated the Kedron Lions by 50 points. South East Suns 15.13.103 def Kedron Lions 8.5.53. Seniors Playing Assistant Coach Christopher Mitchell was awarded Best on Ground Honours. The Reserves capped off a good year for the club by also making the Grand Final but went down to the Redcliffe Tigers by 55 points. Redcliffe Tigers 12.13.85 def South East Suns 4.6.30. Seniors Full Forward Trent McIntyre took out the League Goal Kicking Award with an amazing 114 goals for the season and Senior Coach David Sloan was awarded the Queensland Amateur Football Association (QAFA) coach of the year.

== Honours ==
PREMIERSHIPS

Seniors – 1978, 1980, 1985 & 2016

Reserves – 1981 & 1993

300 GAMES

S. Carroll, B. McIllmurray

200 GAMES

A. Allard, G. Krieger, M. Shield, G. Booth, D. Sloan, G. Brookes, W. Thomas

100 GAMES

D. C. Marshall, B. Reader, C. Fletcher J. Gebbie, M. Sinclair, S. Reader, S. Czapp, I. Salmoni, S. Bettles, B. Cure, L. Maher, S. Allard, M. Kennedy, M. Hartup, B. Pike, C. Welldon, G. Murphy, N. Richardson, P. Coulston, S. Mansell, A. Hawkes, B. Truscott, G. McKenzie, S. Allender, M. Shields, B. Mudford, G. Poplett, K. Lane, N. Grose, R. Rowett, B. Apap, F. Davidson, K. Johnson, S. Stewart, J. Tishler, D. Vincent, B. Doherty, G. Broadstock, C. Achilles, D. Clarke, P. Cox, T. Durward, M. Hanniford, R. Hobbs, D. Hollindale, M. Johnson, J. Kearnan, D. Mann, E. Nugent, M. Tottle, M. Zingelmann

GAMES RECORD HOLDER

Brian McIllmurray – 357 games

COMPETITION BEST & FAIREST WINNERS

Seniors: 1991 – M. Warden, 1992 – M. Johnson, 1993 & 1994 – P. Cox, 2006 – S. Stone, 2007 – G. Brookes, 2010, 2011 & 2012 – D. Milligan

Reserves: 2000 – P Coulston, 2009 & 2010 – M Kennedy, 2015 – M Giuliani

SUNS LIFE MEMBERS

J. Juett Snr, T. Buckley, D. Clarke, A. Hawkes, G. Booth, M. Shield, A. Allard, B. Carroll, S. Carroll, C. Clift, M. Carter, B. McIllmurray, R. Poppleton, D. Sloan, G. Krieger, C. Allard, K. Johnson, G. Brookes, B. Doherty, L. Matheson, K. Bentley, R. Bettles, P. Coulston, W. Thomas, C. Thomas, W. Bettles, D. Kercheval, D. C. Marshall, P. Opbroek

== Premierships ==
SENIORS

- 1978
- 1980
- 1985
- 2016

RESERVES

- 1981
- 1993
