= Ipswich Australian Football Club =

Australian rules football club in Queensland Australia

Ipswich Eagles

Names
- Full name: Ipswich Eagles Australian Football Club
- Nickname: Eagles

2022 season
- After finals: Men’s - 3rd Women’s 8th
- Home-and-away season: Men’s - 2nd Women’s 8th
- Leading goalkicker: TBA
- Best and fairest: TBA

Club details
- Founded: 2001; 25 years ago
- Colours
- Competition: SEQAFL Men’s - Division 4 Women’s - Division 2
- President: Scott Humphreys
- Coach: Men’s Brett East; Women’s Scott Humphreys & Eden Bruce
- Captain(s): Alex & Jackson
- Premierships: 1 - 2019 Women
- Ground: Limestone Park, Ipswich

Uniforms
Home

The Ipswich Australian Football Club is an Australian rules football club located in Ipswich, Queensland, Australia. The club emblem is the Eagle and the club plays in the third Division of the SEQAFL Div 3.

== Premierships ==
- List of Premierships: 1 Women 2019
- Grand Final Appearances (6):
  - 2004, 2005, 2012 (Reserves),2017, 2018, 2019 (Women)
