= Giffin Park =

Sports venue in Coorparoo, Australia

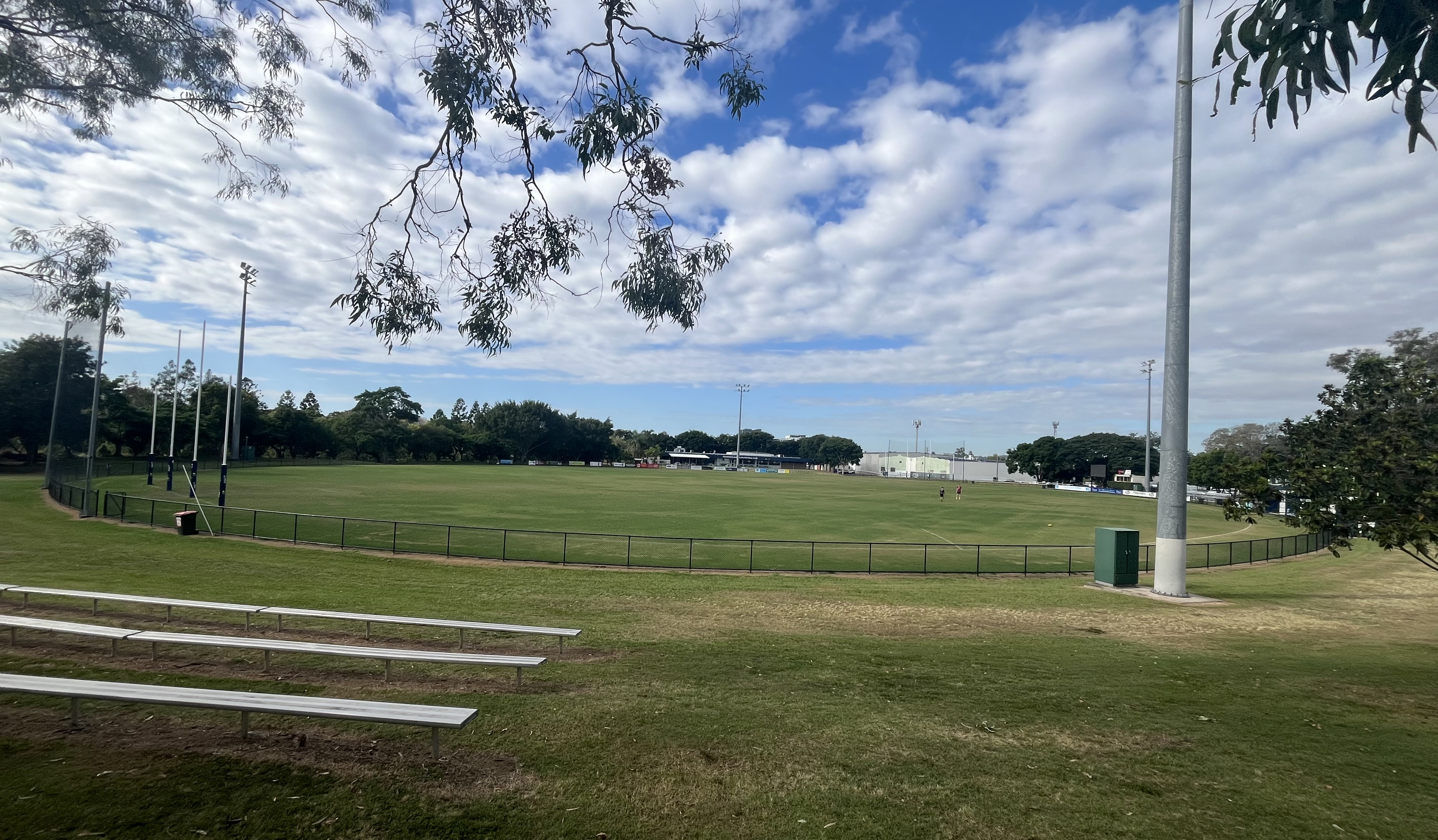
- Interactive map of Giffin Park
- Former names: Coorparoo Racecourse (1891-1899); Kempton Park Racecourse (1900-1950)
- Location: Birubi Street, Coorparoo
- Coordinates: 27°29′07″S 153°03′19″E
- Owner: Brisbane City Council
- Operator: AFL Queensland
- Capacity: 5,000
- Surface: Grass
- Scoreboard: Yes
- Record attendance: 5,000
- Field size: 159 m × 123 m (522 ft × 404 ft)

Construction
- Opened: 1891

Tenants
- Coorparoo Football Club; QAFL; QFA; Coorparoo Junior Australian Football Club; South East Queensland Juniors (SEQJ)

Giffin Park is a sports venue in Coorparoo, a suburb in Brisbane, Australia. It includes an Australian rules football ground and is the home ground of the Coorparoo Football Club and the Coorparoo Junior Australian Football Club

It was formerly used by the Brisbane Lions as their secondary training venue. The Lions NEAFL team formerly used it as a home ground.

It has been used as a major Queensland Australian Football League venue hosting many of the QAFL's premier division Grand Finals in the 21st Century, including 1999–2004, 2009–2010 and 2022.

== See also ==
- Sport in Queensland
