= Springfield Central Stadium =

Australian rules football stadium in Ipswich, Queensland, Australia

Springfield Central Stadium Brighton Homes Arena

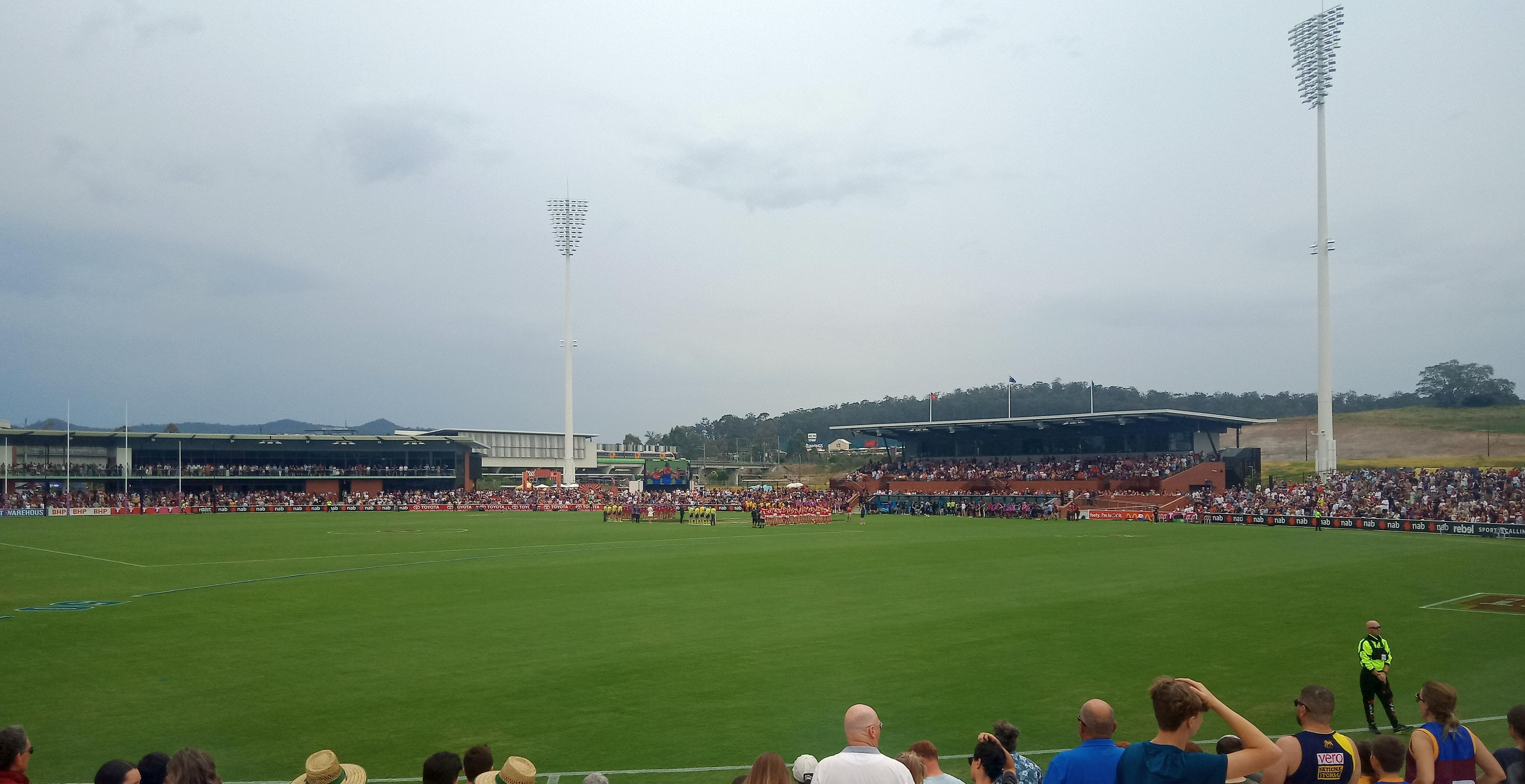
- Springfield Central Stadium in 2022
- Interactive map of Springfield Central Stadium; Brighton Homes Arena
- Former names: Northern Sports Field
- Location: Springfield, Queensland
- Coordinates: 27°40′19.7″S 152°54′15.3″E
- Owner: Ipswich City Council
- Operator: Brisbane Lions
- Capacity: 8,000 (650 grandstand)
- Surface: Grass
- Record attendance: 7,412 (2022 AFL Women's season 7 Grand Final)

Construction
- Groundbreaking: 17 May 2021; 5 years ago
- Opened: 16 October 2022; 4 years ago
- Cost: A$82.1 million
- Architect: Populous
- Builder: Hutchinson Builders
- Project manager: COHA Group
- Structural engineer: Northrop
- Services engineer: VAE Group

Tenants
- Brisbane Lions; Administration and training (2022–); AFLW (2022–); VFL (2023–)

Website
- brightonhomesarena.com.au

Springfield Central Stadium (also known due to naming rights sponsorship as Brighton Homes Arena) is an Australian rules football venue located in Springfield, a suburb of Ipswich, approximately 30 km south-west of Brisbane.

The facility has been the permanent training and administrative home of professional Australian Football League (AFL) club the Brisbane Lions since 2022. The venue plays host to the club's AFL pre-season home practice matches as well as matches for the AFL Women's (AFLW), Victorian Football League (VFL) and the club's men's and women's Academy (junior) squad programs. Its main playing field is known as the Michael Voss Oval in honour of Michael Voss, who played a combined 289 games for the Brisbane Bears and Brisbane Lions.

The first game played at the venue was the 2022 AFL Women's season 7 Grand Final, which attracted a sell out crowd.

== History ==
=== Australian rules football in Ipswich ===
The City of Ipswich has a long association with Australian rules, with some of the earliest matches in the 1860s played there. Ipswich Grammar School was the first school in Queensland to adopt football in 1868. The senior Ipswich Football Club (1870-1940s) was the first senior football club based there, calling the North Ipswich Reserve home. Between 1870 and 1892 Ipswich was by far the stronghold of the code in the state. Interstate Australian rules contests between Queensland and New South Wales were also played at the North Ipswich Oval. Even after the collapse of the Queensland Football Association in 1890 support for the code was stronger in Ipswich than anywhere else in the colony. However following failed attempts to re-establish the code, it became a stronghold for rugby union followed by rugby league and soccer. Australian rules has seen a resurgence since the 1950s and 1960s, and current clubs date back to this time. In recent years, the western growth corridor had seen a boom in participation and it has produced professional players for the Brisbane Lions, including men's team players Rhan Hooper (played for the Ipswich Eagles) and Sean Yoshiura as well as AFLW team players Kate Lutkins and Dakota Davidson.

=== Brisbane Lions search for a permanent home ===
Since its creation as an amalgamated team in 1996, the Brisbane Lions have always trained at the 42,000-seat Gabba during the football season, which is the senior men's team home ground. During the off-season, the Lions usually shifted training sessions to various suburban grounds. Over the years this has included the University of Queensland campus, Leyshon Park in Yeronga, Giffin Park in Coorparoo, Moreton Bay Central Sports Complex (MBCSC) in Burpengary, South Pine Sports Complex in Brendale and elsewhere, meaning the club lacked a dedicated and permanent home year-round. When the club entered a women's team in the AFL Women's competition in 2017, it played home matches at MBCSC and Hickey Park in the north of Brisbane and later Maroochydore Multi Sports Complex on the Sunshine Coast. The Lions considered the facilities on the northern corridor including the Sunshine Coast, Moreton and Brendale as permanent homes but none were deemed suitable as AFL level facilities. Consequently the club sought to establish a permanent training and administrative base for the senior men's team that could also host AFLW and reserves matches.

=== Selection and construction ===
As early as 2012, AFL Queensland CEO Michael Conlon flagged the code's ambition to establish a permanent presence in the western corridor, claiming that Ipswich would one day host AFL premiership matches. Having evaluated various sites north of Brisbane along with greenfield sites near Brisbane Airport and sites in the southern corridor such as Springwood in 2018, the Brisbane Lions settled on vacant land in Springfield. $70 million was the initial estimate for the cost of construction, with the final cost being $82.1 million. The Lions and the AFL contributed $10m, Ipswich Council $12m, Springfield Land Corporation $18m and the Queensland Government $15m. The final $15m stream of funding was secured from the federal government in late January 2019, allowing earthworks and preliminary construction of the facility to commence later that year. The facility had a working title of The Reserve Community Arena at Springfield. Major construction commenced in March 2020 and the club moved into the facility upon its completion in October 2022. The Brisbane Lions signed a 99-year lease on the facility.

=== Design features ===
The design incorporated themes from the Fitzroy Football Club (part of the Brisbane Lions merger), the main grandstand pays homage to the red brick main stand of Fitzroy's old home ground the Brunswick Street Oval with its central double stair, red brick base and low pitch roof. A large depiction of the traditional Fitzroy Lion motif in pixel art decorates the facade near the main entrance. The design also makes reference to Ipswich, its traditional red brick and Queenslander architecture with its large open balconies.

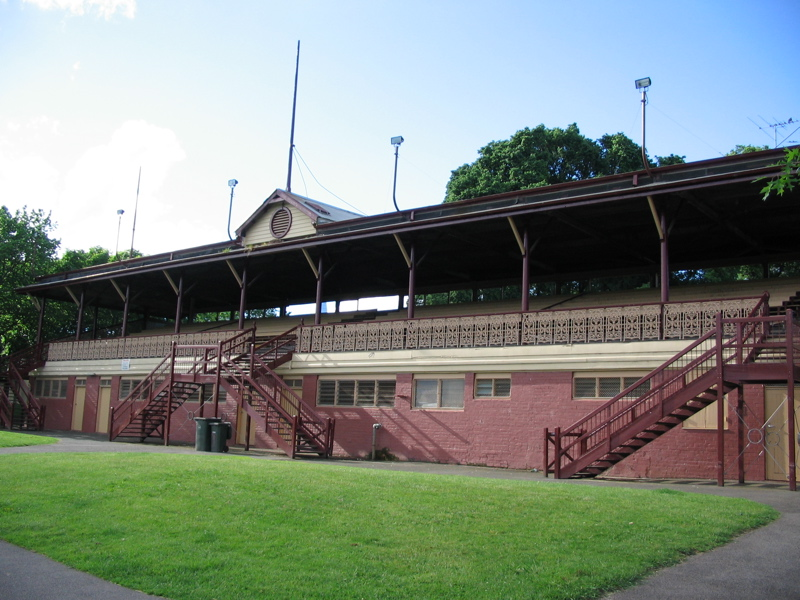
Brunswick Street Oval (Fitzroy North), an inspiration for Michael Voss Oval

=== Competition use ===
The first match played at the venue was the 2022 AFL Women's season 7 Grand Final (2022) between Brisbane and Melbourne which attracted a sell-out crowd of 7,412. The first men's AFL match at the venue, a 2023 pre-season practice match between the Brisbane Lions and the previous year's premiers Geelong also attracted a sell out crowd but with an official attendance of 4,500. Attendances have not been published for VFL men's matches, however AFLW and AFL attendances averaged 3,211 during the 2023 AFLW Season.

The Brisbane Lions revealed their 2024 premiership cup to 6,102 fans at the conclusion of a week 5 AFL Women's match, the second largest attendance in the ground's history.

== Facilities ==
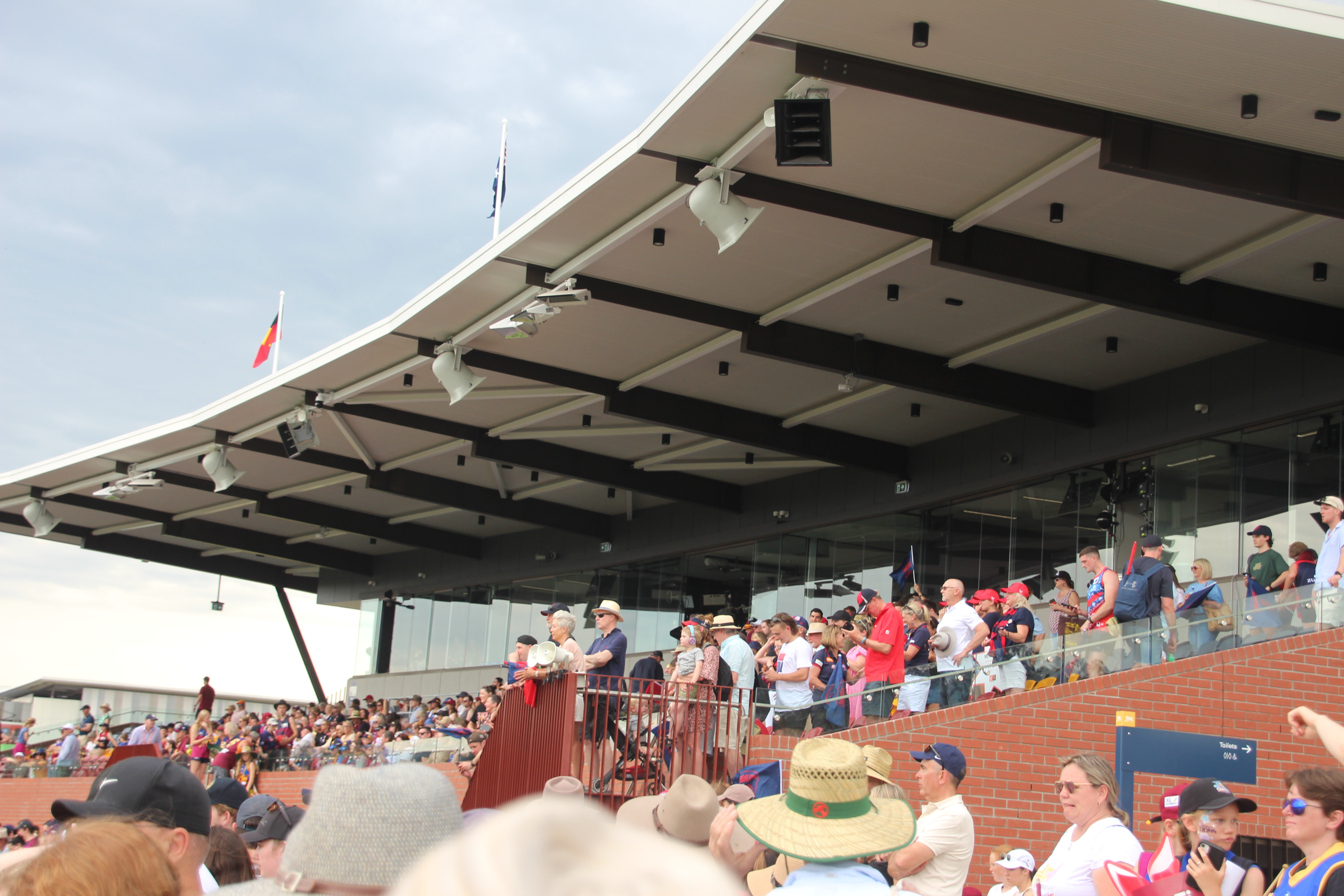
Main grandstand

Springfield Central Stadium's initial capacity was estimated at up to 10,000 however upon opening the official capacity was downgraded to 8,000. There are several rows of bleacher seating around the perimeter, administration and indoor training buildings, a grandstand with seating for 650 spectators, a balcony extending across the two clubhouse buildings, grassed slopes, four light towers and a scoreboard. Other spectator facilities include a bar, a cafe and a club merchandise outlet.

The original plans for the precinct included a smaller oval positioned on the opposite side of Eden Staion Drive. In 2026 Andrew Wellington, CEO of the Brisbane Lions, revealed the club planned to have the oval constructed "within the next couple of years".

The broader precinct encompasses training and administration facilities catering for the men's and women's elite players, such as a high-performance gymnasium, extensive learning and teaching facilities, lap pool, aquatic recovery pools, and a cafe and other spaces for community use.

== Naming rights ==
In May 2021, the Brisbane Lions announced that Springfield Central Stadium would be known for commercial purposes as Brighton Homes Arena, in a deal signed with home construction company Brighton Homes.
