= Noosa Tigers =

Names
- Full name: Noosa Tigers Australian Football Club
- Nickname: Tigers

2026 QAFL season
- After finals: 8th (Elimination Final)
- Home-and-away season: 8th

Club details
- Founded: 1970; 56 years ago
- Colours
- Competition: QAFL
- President: Bruce Davidson
- Coach: Chris Rourke
- Captain: Aaron Laskey
- Ground: Rococo Oval

Uniforms
Home

Other information
- Official website: noosatigers.com.au

The Noosa Tigers Australian Football Club is an Australian rules football club based in Noosaville on the Sunshine Coast, Queensland. The club emblem is the tiger and the club plays in the QAFL. Noosa Tigers are current QAFL 2022 Finalist. 2020 saw the introduction of Noosa's first AFLW team, who finished premiers in Queensland Football Association Div 2. 2021 marks the inception of the Noosa Tigers into the QAFL seniors and reserves competition.

== Season results ==
(since 2011):

Season	Division	Result	No. of teams in division
2011	AFLQ Premier Division	Premiers	11
2012	SEQAFL Division 1	3rd	11
2013	SEQAFL Division 1	11th	12
2014	QFA North	2nd	8
2015	QFA North	3rd	7
2016	QFA North	4th	6
2017	QFA Division 1	2nd	10
2018	QFA Division 1	2nd	10
2019	QFA Division 1	Premiers	10
2020	QFA Division 1	Premiers	10

== Honours ==
- QFA
  - Premiers (11): 1973, 1975, 1976, 1977, 1980, 1981, 1985, 2010, 2011, 2019, 2020
  - Runners Up (10): 1970, 1972, 1979, 1982, 1984, 1987, 1989, 1994, 2017, 2018
- QFA Div 2 Women's
  - Premiers (1): 2020
