= Surfers Paradise Australian Football Club =

Football club

Surfers Paradise Demons

Names
- Full name: Surfers Paradise Australian Football Club
- Nickname: Demons
- Club song: It's A Grand Old Flag

2026 QAFL season
- After finals: 3rd (Preliminary Final)
- Home-and-away season: 3rd

Club details
- Founded: 1961; 65 years ago
- Colours
- Competition: Queensland Australian Football League
- Chairperson: Haydn Chambers
- Premierships: QAFL: 1 (2019)
- Ground: Sir Bruce Small Park

Uniforms
Home

Other information
- Official website: https://spafc.com.au

Surfers Paradise Australian Football Club (nicknamed The Demons) is a Gold Coast based club competing in the AFL Queensland QAFL Australian rules football competition.

== History ==
The Surfers Paradise Australian Football Club was established in 1961 and competed in the Gold Coast Australian Football League's official inaugural season in 1962 with their home ground situated a few blocks from the Pacific Ocean on Beach Road. The club captured its first senior premiership in 1963 and back-to-back-to-back senior GCAFL flags followed in 1967, 1968 & 1969. More senior premierships were won by Surfers Paradise in 1972 & 1974. In 1983, the club moved to the neighbouring suburb of Benowa and set up base at Sir Bruce Small Park managed to sneak into the 1983 GCAFL Grand Final in their first season in Benowa but were defeated by Coolangatta. They bounced back to win the 1984 premiership at Carrara but lost the Grand Final in 1985 by five points.

Former Hawthorn player Max McMahon was appointed senior coach in 1992 and he secured a premiership in his first year as head coach. It was followed by a five-point loss in the 1993 Grand Final. The 1992 forward line that included Andrew Gibson a former Williamstown star forward, Gibson kicked 525 goals for the club in 78 senior games, an average of 6.5 goals per game. Half Forward Barry Oates starred in the 1992 finals series kicking 17 goals including 8 goals in the Preliminary Final against Burleigh. Oates also went on to win the league's Most Valuable Player award voted by the League's coaches. Centreman Rod Brewster capped off a great season with selection into the Queensland state side. Ruckman Paul Hams won the club Best & Fairest Award with Oates runner up.

During 1996, former Geelong player and then Surfers Paradise Captain/Coach David Cameron notably kicked twenty-five goals in a single game. Mass confusion occurred during the 1998 Gold Coast Grand Final between Surfers Paradise and Palm Beach Currumbin when the scoreboard incorrectly displayed a full-time scoreline draw of 9.10 (64) to PBC's 8.14 (62). After several minutes of confusion, the umpires correctly adjusted the score to declare Surfers Paradise two-point victors and hand the club its 10th senior premiership. In 2000, The Gold Coast division was wound up and clubs played in an enlarged AFL South Queensland competition, after two seasons in which the club fell on hard times and the club was restructured to become the Surfers Paradise Australian Football Club Inc and was relegated to Division Two.

In 2005, Queensland Australian Football was restructured into two divisions. Surfers Paradise was promoted back into the Pineapple Hotel Cup (Division One) competition. Another restructure in 2012 saw the AFL Pineapple Hotel Cup become SEQAFL Division 1 Pineapple Hotel Cup and Surfers Paradise were promoted into the top state level QAFL upon its rebirth in 2014. Brad Moore coached the club claimed its first senior QAFL premiership in 2019 with a tight two-point victory over cross town rivals Palm Beach Currumbin at Metricon Stadium.

== Premierships ==
Gold Coast Australian Football League

- 1963, 1967, 1968, 1969, 1972, 1974, 1984, 1990, 1992.

AFLQ Gold Coast Division

- 1998

Queensland Australian Football League

- 2019

== Juniors ==
The juniors were formed in 1962 as one of six foundation members of the Gold Coast Juniors Football League and in 1964 the under 16s won the premiership. The Under 18s/ 17s won eight consecutive premierships from 1965 to 1972.(Coolangatta won under 17's 1970 & Southport won 1971) The Junior and Senior clubs have delivered fourteen players to the AFL.

=== Notable junior players ===
- Steven McLuckie Brisbane Bears/Lions
- Darren Carlson Brisbane Bears/Lions
- Matthew Kennedy Brisbane Bears/Lions
- Marcus Ashcroft Brisbane Bears/Lions
- Clark Keating Brisbane Lions
- Daniel Merrett Brisbane Lions
- Trent Knobel Brisbane Lions
- Marc Woolnough Geelong
- Brad Moran North Melbourne & Adelaide
- Aaron Keating Adelaide
- Ricky Petterd Melbourne
- Jesse White Sydney
- Brent Renouf Hawthorn & Port Adelaide
- Dayne Zorko Brisbane Lions

== AFL Drafted Players ==
Year	Name	Team	Draft No.
1992	Clark Keating	Brisbane Bears	QLD Zone Selection
2009 AFL Queensland Zone Selection	Jesse Haberfield	Gold Coast	QLD Zone Selection
2009 AFL Queensland Zone Selection	Jack Stanlake	Gold Coast	QLD Zone Selection
2011 AFL Queensland Zone Selection	Dayne Zorko	Gold Coast	QLD Zone Selection
2014	Braydon Preuss	North Melbourne	15th (rookie)
2016	Jack Bowes	Gold Coast	10th
