= 2023 QAFLW season =

23rd season of the QAFL Women's

- Teams: 8
- Premiers: Bond University; 1st premiership
- Minor premiers: Aspley
- Leading goalkicker: Jessica Stallard (Aspley − 32 goals)

The 2023 QAFLW season was the 23rd season of the QAFL Women's (QAFLW), the highest-level senior women's Australian rules football competition in Queensland. The season featured eight clubs, beginning on 15 April and concluding on 27 August.

The premiership was won by Bond University for the first time, after they defeated Aspley by 49 points in the 2023 QAFLW Grand Final.

== Ladder ==
Pos	Team	Pld	W	L	D	PF	PA	PP	Pts	Qualification
1	Southport	14	13	1	0	876	181	484.0	52	Finals series
2	Bond University (P)	14	11	3	0	753	324	232.4	44	Finals series
3	Aspley	14	9	4	1	704	454	155.1	38	Finals series
4	Coorparoo	14	8	5	1	540	417	129.5	34	Finals series
5	UQ Red Lions	14	6	8	0	374	498	75.1	24	
6	Wilston Grange	14	5	9	0	343	622	55.1	20	
7	Maroochydore	14	3	11	0	256	742	34.5	12	
8	Yeronga	14	0	14	0	235	843	27.9	0	

Rules for classification: 1) points; 2) percentage; 3) number of points for.
(P) Premiers

== Finals series ==
=== Semi-finals ===
	Semi-finals
Saturday, 12 August (2:00 pm)	Southport 4.5 (29)	def. by	Bond University 7.9 (51)	Fankhauser Reserve
Saturday, 12 August (4:45 pm)	Aspley 8.8 (56)	def.	Coorparoo 1.7 (13)	Graham Road Oval

=== Preliminary final ===
	Preliminary final
Saturday, 19 August (2:00 pm)	Southport 4.8 (32)	def. by	Aspley 6.4 (40)	Fankhauser Reserve

=== Grand Final ===
2023 QAFLW Grand Final
Sunday, 27 August (2:20 pm)	Bond University	v	Aspley	Brighton Homes Arena
0.4 (4); 3.5 (23); 6.5 (41); 10.6 (66)	Q1; Q2; Q3; Final	1.0 (6); 1.2 (8); 2.2 (14); 2.5 (17)
3: Usher; 2: Harrington; 1: Calleja, Harris, McCabe, Milne	Goals	1: Bryant, Vetter
Harris, Usher, Harrington, Milne, Bischa, Sexton	Best	Pittman, Tyson, Martin, Daniec, Pengelly, O'Flaherty

== See also ==
- 2023 QAFL season
