= Ben Warren =

Ben Warren may refer to:

- Ben Warren (English footballer)
- Ben Warren (Australian rules footballer)
- Ben Warren (rugby union)
- Ben Warren (Grey's Anatomy)
