= Wayne Brittain =

Australian rules footballer and coach

Personal information
- Full name: Wayne Brittain
- Born: 13 June 1958 (age 68)

Coaching career
Years	Club	Games (W–L–D)
2001–2002	Carlton	46 (18–28–0)

Wayne Brittain (born 13 June 1958) is a former coach of the Carlton Football Club in the Australian Football League (AFL).

== Career ==
=== Playing career ===
In his playing career, Brittain played for Zillmere Eagles in the Queensland State League. He eventually suffered a back injury which ended his career.

=== Brisbane Bears ===
Brittain then took up coaching in 1994 and became an assistant coach of Brisbane Bears under senior coach Robert Walls. The following two seasons with the Bears saw little success, but provided a steep learning curve.

=== Carlton Football Club ===
In 1996, Brittain then became the assistant coach at the Carlton Football Club under senior coach David Parkin. Brittain's time as assistant coach at Carlton lasted for five years, during which he earned respect as an excellent communicator and game-day tactician. By 2000, Parkin had so much confidence in his assistant Brittain, that he handed over the tactical responsibility during matches on a regular basis. It was a method deemed unusual, however, when the Blues were powered by an incredible season by Anthony Koutoufides and won 13 games in a row, and made the Preliminary Finals, it was safe to say that it worked. Brittain was credited with much of the club's success in the 2000 home and away season.

After Parkin's retirement as Carlton Football Club senior coach at the end of the 2000 season, Parkin then handed the coaching reins to Brittain. Brittain then became the senior coach of Carlton Football Club, serving in the role from 2001 until 2002. With Carlton under Brittain, he guided the club to fifth place in the 2001 season reaching the finals, but were eliminated by Richmond in the semi-finals. However, in the 2002 season, Carlton under Brittain crashed, when the club's on-field performance deteriorated mainly due to the club's salary cap breaches to finish in last place on the ladder, which was the sixteenth position with three wins and nineteen losses. This was the first time Carlton had ever received the VFL/AFL wooden spoon. Brittain was then sacked as Carlton Football Club senior coach, at the end of the 2002 season and was replaced by Denis Pagan as Carlton Football Club senior coach.

=== Richmond Football Club ===
Brittain went on to be an assistant coach at Richmond Football Club under senior coach Danny Frawley, for the 2003 season and 2004 season, before leaving at the end of the 2004 season after Frawley resigned.

=== Zillmere Eagles ===
He returned to Queensland to coach his old club, the Zillmere Eagles in 2005, but was sacked by the club after eighteen months, after being fined for abusing the umpires after a Zillmere loss.

=== Brisbane Lions ===
On 15 September 2008, Brittain became an assistant coach of Brisbane Lions under senior coach Michael Voss for the 2009 season. However, after one season, Brittain left the Brisbane Lions, when he departed from his role as assistant coach.

== Personal life ==
Wayne is the brother of former North Melbourne player Craig Brittain.
