= 2021 VFL season =

139th season of the Victorian Football League

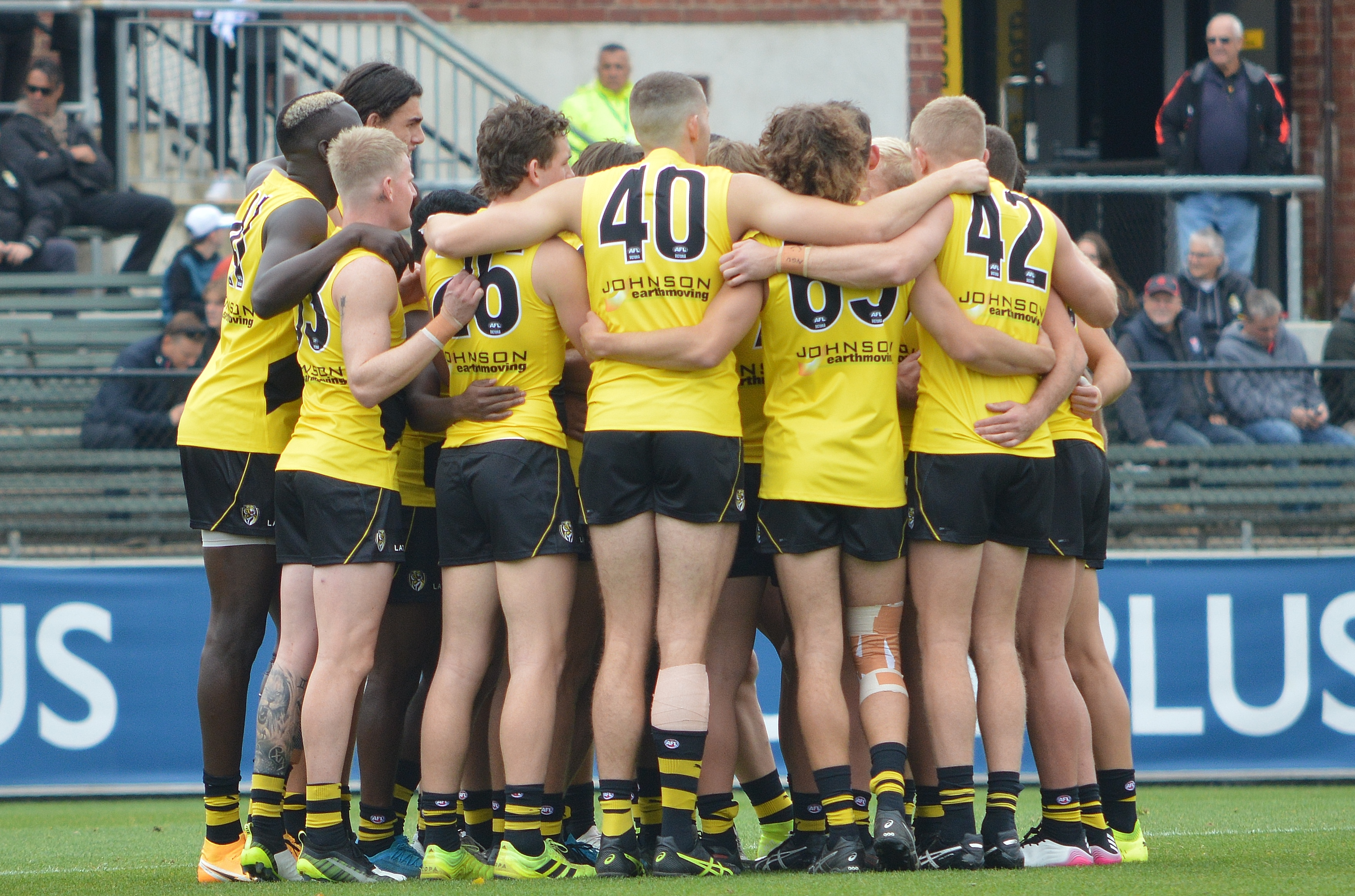
- Richmond playing Sandringham in round 1
- Date: 16 April – 1 September 2021
- Teams: 22
- Premiers: Not awarded
- Minor premiers: Footscray reserves 1st minor premiership
- J. J. Liston Trophy: Not awarded
- Frosty Miller Medallist: Matthew Hammelmann (Aspley – 42 goals)

The 2021 VFL season was the 139th season of the Victorian Football League (VFL), a second-tier Australian rules football competition played in the states of Victoria, New South Wales, and Queensland. The season began on 16 April but was curtailed without a premiership awarded on 1 September, due to the impact of the COVID-19 pandemic.

The 2021 season saw significant transition in the composition of the league, with the amalgamation of the North East Australian Football League (NEAFL) into the VFL and resulting expansion interstate into New South Wales and Queensland. The league also underwent some shifts as a result of the financial fall-out from the first year of the pandemic, which had seen the 2020 season cancelled without a match played; and, a transition in league rules to strengthen its position as a pathway between underage and professional leagues.

The season was played during and disrupted by the ongoing pandemic, with several rounds of play cancelled owing to restrictions sporadically in place across the three states. The health-related restrictions imposed by the Victoria and New South Wales governments forced the league abandon the season before a finals series could be completed. Footscray was recognised as the minor premier, but no premiership was awarded.

== League membership ==
=== Amalgamation with the NEAFL ===
The North East Australian Football League had served as the top state-level league in New South Wales, the Australian Capital Territory, Queensland (and previously for the Northern Territory) since 2011. Throughout its existence, the NEAFL had accommodated the reserves teams of the states' four AFL clubs – Sydney, Greater Western Sydney, Brisbane Lions and Gold Coast – and several stand-alone senior clubs from the regions. The NEAFL's utility as a development league and talent pathway had long suffered as a result of the substantial gap in standard between its weakest teams and players, its strongest teams and players, and AFL level – gaps which had been far more pronounced than in the VFL. The AFL clubs had long been keen for a higher quality league for their reserves teams to contest, and the AFL had been keen to improve the senior development pathways. The high costs of running the NEAFL also became acutely problematic due to the massive financial losses suffered by the football industry during the COVID-19 pandemic. As was the case for the VFL, the 2020 NEAFL season was cancelled due to the pandemic.

In August 2020, it was announced that the NEAFL would amalgamate into the VFL, with all of its clubs afforded the opportunity to join the VFL, over a transitional period in 2021 and 2022. This was expected to provide both the AFL clubs and the northeastern pathway clubs with a higher standard of competition, improving player development and senior pathways in the north east. Six of the NEAFL's nine teams joined the new competition: the Sydney reserves, Greater Western Sydney reserves, Brisbane reserves and Gold Coast reserves, and two stand-alone senior clubs from Queensland: Gold Coast based Southport Sharks and Brisbane based Aspley Hornets. Sydney based Sydney University was offered a licence before ultimately declining due to the cost to compete being too high. The Canberra Demons and Brisbane based Redland both declined to join the merged competition before licenses were offered.

The competition was referred to by the working title "VFL/East Coast second-tier competition" in official correspondence during part of the offseason, before the "Victorian Football League" name was ultimately retained unchanged.

=== Changes to Victorian clubs ===
The financial pressures of the pandemic resulted in many AFL clubs seeking lower-cost reserves affiliation options. A new, lowest-cost option was made available to the AFL clubs, under which reserves players would be dispersed throughout the various VFL clubs rather than being affiliated to a single club, but no club took up the option. In July 2020, The Age reported that North Melbourne was exploring the possibility of returning to an affiliation after two years of fielding its own reserves team, although this did not eventuate for the 2021 season.

Ultimately, the only change for 2021 was that the affiliation between Carlton and the Northern Blues was terminated after eighteen seasons – this had been announced in March 2020, prior to the cancellation of the 2020 season. This affiliation had been high cost for Carlton due to the large amount of money it had been investing in the club as a development pathway in the region. Carlton fielded its reserves team in the league for the first time since the 2002 season. Furthermore, the administration of the Northern Blues – which had initially announced that it would have to fold without Carlton's financial backing and was not included in the aborted plans for a shortened 2020 season – worked successfully through the year to find a means to remain viable as a stand-alone senior club, and returned to the league under its former Northern Bullants name, and in its traditional red and white colours.

=== Other notes ===
No Tasmanian team was introduced to the league in 2021 as part of the expansion interstate; although AFL Tasmania had gained a provisional licence in 2018 to re-establish a Tasmanian team in the VFL from 2021, plans for this were deferred during the pandemic.

The seven new clubs expanded the competition to a total of 22 clubs, the most to contest a VFA/VFL season since 1987, and the most ever to contest a VFA/VFL premiership in a single division.

The governing bodies took deliberate moves to strengthen the VFL's utility as a pathway league, through which undrafted players from the underage systems could continue to develop and then be drafted into the AFL system. In doing this, age restrictions were set requiring each team to field at least six under-22 players in each game. Under-age players were allocated to clubs on a zoning basis, with each NAB League club and academy system allocated to a specific VFL club or clubs, thus allowing for greater interchange and continuity.

Annual grants from the AFL to the stand-alone VFL clubs, which had been introduced in 2000 when the AFL reserves first amalgamated with the VFL, were abandoned due to the financial pressures of the pandemic. The salary cap for the competition was also significantly reduced, from $380k to $200k, or $100k for AFL reserves teams or those with reserves affiliations. Interstate travel costs for the competition will be financed by the AFL, and the fixture for AFL-aligned teams was 80% aligned with the AFL fixture to allow for entire club playing squads to travel together.

The season saw a trial of positional restriction rules, under which each team was required to have two players inside each 50-metre arc at each boundary throw-in stoppage. The rule was intended to reduce around-the-ground congestion. When the trial was originally announced, the rules went further, requiring three players inside each 50-metre arc – including one in each goal square – at every kick-in and boundary throw-in; but this was relaxed after several pre-season practice matches and before the home and away season, after several AFL coaches remarked that the rules made it too difficult for players seeking to transition to AFL from the second-tier competition. Following its trial in the 2021 VFL season it was assessed for potential inclusion in the national Laws of the Game, but ultimately rejected.

Broadcast coverage of the VFL was expanded, with three matches per round available on sports streaming service Kayo Sports, in addition to the ongoing one match per round broadcast on Seven Network and one Thursday night match broadcast on Fox Footy, where no Thursday night fixture in the AFL was scheduled.

== Clubs ==
=== Venues and affiliations ===
Club	State	Home venue(s)	Capacity	AFL affiliation
Aspley	QLD	Graham Road Oval	3,000	—N/a
Box Hill	VIC	Box Hill City Oval	10,000	Hawthorn
Brisbane	QLD	South Pine Sports Complex	3,000	Brisbane
Brisbane	QLD	Moreton Bay Central Sports Complex	8,000	Brisbane
Brisbane	QLD	The Gabba	37,478	Brisbane
Carlton	VIC	Ikon Park	13,000	Carlton
Casey	VIC	Casey Fields	9,000	Melbourne
Coburg	VIC	Piranha Park	15,000	—N/a
Coburg	VIC	Highgate Recreation Reserve	5,000	—N/a
Collingwood	VIC	Holden Centre	3,500	Collingwood
Collingwood	VIC	Victoria Park	10,000	Collingwood
Essendon	VIC	Windy Hill	10,000	Essendon
Footscray	VIC	VU Whitten Oval	10,000	Western Bulldogs
Frankston	VIC	SkyBus Stadium	5,000	—N/a
Geelong	VIC	GMHBA Stadium	36,000	Geelong
Geelong	VIC	Marvel Stadium	53,343	Geelong
Gold Coast	QLD	Austworld Centre Oval	1,000	Gold Coast
Gold Coast	QLD	Metricon Stadium	25,000	Gold Coast
Greater Western Sydney	NSW	Blacktown ISP Oval	1,000	Greater Western Sydney
North Melbourne	VIC	Arden Street Oval	4,000	North Melbourne
North Melbourne	VIC	Marvel Stadium	53,343	North Melbourne
Northern Bullants	VIC	Preston City Oval	5,000	—N/a
Port Melbourne	VIC	ETU Stadium	6,000	—N/a
Richmond	VIC	Swinburne Centre	2,800	Richmond
Sandringham	VIC	WS Trevor Barker Beach Oval	6,000	St Kilda
Southport	QLD	Fankhauser Reserve	8,000	—N/a
Sydney	NSW	Tramway Oval	1,000	Sydney
Sydney	NSW	Sydney Cricket Ground	48,000	Sydney
Werribee	VIC	Avalon Airport Oval	8,000	—N/a
Williamstown	VIC	Downer Oval	6,000	—N/a

=== Coach appointments ===
New coach	Club	Date of appointment	Previous coach	Ref
Jake Batchelor	Sandringham	13 October 2020	Adrian Connolly	
Sam Mitchell	Box Hill	28 October 2020	Max Bailey	
Justin Plapp	Williamstown	26 November 2020	Andy Collins	
Stewart Edge	Footscray	19 December 2020	Daniel Giansiracusa	

== Home-and-away season ==
The season was played during the second year of the COVID-19 pandemic. As the season began, Australia had largely settled into a paradigm of most states maintaining zero COVID-19 cases outside of their international travel quarantine systems; this allowed football games to be played in front of crowds, usually with reduced capacity, and unhindered interstate travel was permitted without quarantine. However, the different state governments often responded quickly to small numbers or even single virus cases being discovered in the community; this meant border restrictions or quarantine periods were at times re-introduced at short notice, impacting interstate travel for games; and, in some cases, that city- or state-wide lockdowns could be imposed within the impacted states, precluding football activities altogether.

The season's original fixture was set with each team playing 16 games over 19 rounds, with three byes per team designed to give the league some flexibility to accommodate cancelled and postponed games later in the season - followed by a four-week finals series played under the AFL final eight system which it had used since 2000. However, this was progressively reduced after lockdowns saw the cancellation of more games than could be made up. Lockdowns ultimately saw the cancellation of Victorian matches across a total of eight home and away rounds, with lockdowns in Queensland also impacting some matches there.

The Victorian lockdown which commenced on 6 August ultimately saw the season abandoned. Like the lockdowns which preceded it, it was originally expected to last for only one week, but eventually ran until 21 October. After two rounds were lost, it became impossible to for teams to play an equal number of home-and-away matches, each team ultimately playing between nine and eleven games each, resulting in the ladder being decided on match ratio for the first time since 1893. When the first round of the finals was lost, the finals were reduced to a simple eight-team knock-out tournament, with contingency to reduce further to a simple four-team knock-out tournament. Following the extension of the lockdown into October, the league formally announced on 1 September that the season was abandoned and no premiership would be awarded. The Footscray reserves team, which was unbeaten from ten home-and-away games, was recognised as minor premier.

=== Round 1 ===
	Round 1
Friday, 16 April (12:00 pm)	Richmond 13.17 (95)	def.	Sandringham 7.13 (55)	Swinburne Centre	Report
Friday, 16 April (7:30 pm)	Frankston 20.6 (126)	def.	Coburg 14.12 (96)	SkyBus Stadium	Report
Saturday, 17 April (11:00 am)	Footscray 16.13 (109)	def.	Gold Coast 6.6 (42)	VU Whitten Oval	Report
Saturday, 17 April (12:00 pm)	Sydney 15.6 (96)	def.	Greater Western Sydney 10.10 (70)	Tramway Oval	Report
Saturday, 17 April (1:00 pm)	Aspley 20.13 (133)	def.	Port Melbourne 12.8 (80)	Graham Road Oval	Report
Saturday, 17 April (1:30 pm)	Brisbane 15.14 (104)	def.	Essendon 5.8 (38)	Moreton Bay Central Sports Complex	Report
Saturday, 17 April (2:00 pm)	Carlton 16.12 (108)	def. by	Southport 17.7 (109)	Ikon Park	Report
Saturday, 17 April (2:30 pm)	Werribee 9.8 (62)	def. by	Collingwood 10.9 (69)	Avalon Airport Oval	Report
Sunday, 18 April (12:05 pm)	Box Hill 9.13 (67)	def. by	Casey 17.16 (118)	Box Hill City Oval (crowd: 1,043)	Report
Sunday, 18 April (1:00 pm)	Geelong 18.15 (123)	def.	North Melbourne 6.8 (44)	GMHBA Stadium	Report
Sunday, 18 April (1:00 pm)	Northern Bullants 6.11 (47)	def. by	Williamstown 14.15 (99)	Preston City Oval	Report

=== Round 2 ===
	Round 2
Thursday, 22 April (7:10 pm)	Greater Western Sydney 10.3 (63)	def. by	Footscray 21.9 (135)	Blacktown ISP Oval	Report
Saturday, 24 April (10:10 am)	Gold Coast 14.11 (95)	def.	Sydney 12.9 (81)	Metricon Stadium	Report
Saturday, 24 April (12:00 pm)	Carlton 24.10 (154)	def.	Brisbane 13.7 (85)	Ikon Park	Report
Saturday, 24 April (1:00 pm)	North Melbourne 5.9 (39)	def. by	Frankston 16.8 (104)	Arden Street Oval	Report
Saturday, 24 April (1:00 pm)	Southport 14.25 (109)	def.	Aspley 15.5 (95)	Fankhauser Reserve	Report
Saturday, 24 April (2:00 pm)	Box Hill 17.10 (112)	def.	Northern Bullants 8.8 (56)	Box Hill City Oval (crowd: 864)	Report
Saturday, 24 April (2:00 pm)	Port Melbourne 13.14 (92)	def.	Sandringham 9.12 (66)	ETU Stadium	Report
Saturday, 24 April (2:00 pm)	Richmond 5.7 (37)	def. by	Casey 13.18 (96)	Swinburne Centre	Report
Saturday, 24 April (2:00 pm)	Collingwood 6.14 (50)	def. by	Essendon 12.13 (85)	Victoria Park	Report
Saturday, 24 April (7:00 pm)	Werribee 7.11 (53)	def. by	Williamstown 9.10 (64)	Avalon Airport Oval	Report
	Bye; Coburg, Geelong
The Gold Coast v Sydney match was moved from Austworld Centre Oval to the adjacent Metricon Stadium.; This was Casey's 750th senior VFA/VFL match.

=== Round 3 ===
	Round 3
Thursday, 29 April (7:10 pm)	North Melbourne 3.6 (24)	def. by	Casey 19.17 (131)	Marvel Stadium	Report
Friday, 30 April (4:00 pm)	Collingwood 9.12 (66)	def.	Gold Coast 9.7 (61)	Holden Centre	Report
Saturday, 1 May (1:05 pm)	Northern Bullants 6.11 (47)	def. by	Footscray 12.18 (90)	Preston City Oval	Report
Saturday, 1 May (2:05 pm)	Werribee 18.16 (124)	def.	Richmond 6.7 (43)	Avalon Airport Oval	Report
Saturday, 1 May (2:35 pm)	Sydney 8.12 (60)	def. by	Geelong 9.10 (64)	Tramway Oval	Report
Saturday, 1 May (7:00 pm)	Frankston 13.14 (92)	def.	Aspley 10.11 (71)	SkyBus Stadium	Report
Saturday, 1 May (7:10 pm)	Williamstown 15.17 (107)	def.	Port Melbourne 10.9 (69)	Downer Oval	Report
Sunday, 2 May (12:00 pm)	Brisbane 8.7 (55)	def. by	Coburg 9.19 (73)	South Pine Sports Complex	Report
Sunday, 2 May (12:05 pm)	Greater Western Sydney 14.10 (94)	def.	Southport 8.16 (64)	Blacktown ISP Oval	Report
Sunday, 2 May (12:05 pm)	Essendon 8.4 (52)	def. by	Carlton 14.17 (101)	Windy Hill	Report
Sunday, 2 May (2:30 pm)	Sandringham 15.8 (98)	def. by	Box Hill 19.14 (128)	Trevor Barker Oval	Report

=== Round 4 ===
	Round 4
Thursday, 6 May (7:10 pm)	Geelong 17.15 (117)	def.	Northern Bullants 11.6 (72)	Marvel Stadium	Report
Saturday, 8 May (12:05 pm)	Collingwood 14.11 (95)	def.	Coburg 13.13 (91)	Victoria Park	Report
Saturday, 8 May (1:35 pm)	Williamstown 17.13 (115)	def.	Frankston 4.7 (31)	Downer Oval	Report
Saturday, 8 May (2:00 pm)	Southport 24.9 (153)	def.	North Melbourne 7.4 (46)	Fankhauser Reserve	Report
Saturday, 8 May (2:35 pm)	Box Hill 8.5 (53)	def. by	Werribee 13.12 (90)	Box Hill City Oval (crowd: 959)	Report
Sunday, 9 May (12:05 pm)	Footscray 11.11 (77)	def.	Carlton 8.11 (59)	VU Whitten Oval	Report
	Bye; Aspley, Brisbane, Casey, Essendon, Gold Coast, Greater Western Sydney, Port Melbourne, Richmond, Sandringham, Sydney
A planned fixture between Casey and Sydney was postponed to round 6 on the Friday before the match due to COVID-19 cases in New South Wales.

=== Round 5 ===
	Round 5
13 May (7:10 pm)	Gold Coast 8.13 (61)	def. by	Brisbane 19.7 (121)	Metricon Stadium	Report
15 May (12:05 pm)	Aspley 7.5 (47)	def. by	Southport 23.18 (156)	Graham Road Oval	Report
15 May (2:00 pm)	Port Melbourne 7.11 (53)	def. by	Coburg 12.17 (89)	ETU Stadium	Report
15 May (2:00 pm)	Casey 7.15 (57)	def.	Geelong 8.8 (56)	Casey Fields	Report
15 May (2:30 pm)	Sandringham 13.9 (87)	def.	Williamstown 11.12 (78)	Trevor Barker Oval	Report
15 May (2:35 pm)	Richmond 19.9 (123)	def.	Greater Western Sydney 3.8 (26)	Swinburne Centre	Report
15 May (4:45 pm)	Sydney 12.14 (86)	def.	Collingwood 8.5 (53)	SCG	Report
16 May (12:05 pm)	Box Hill 23.12 (150)	def.	North Melbourne 6.6 (42)	Box Hill City Oval (crowd: 1,116)	Report
16 May (2:05 pm)	Essendon 12.11 (83)	def.	Frankston 10.8 (68)	Windy Hill	Report
	Bye; Werribee, Carlton, Footscray, Northern Bullants

=== Round 6 ===
	Round 6
Thursday, 20 May (7:10 pm)	Geelong 15.15 (105)	def.	Coburg 7.6 (48)	GMHBA Stadium	Report
Friday, 21 May (7:00 pm)	Southport 17.14 (116)	def.	Gold Coast 5.3 (33)	Fankhauser Reserve (crowd: 2,000)	Report
Friday, 21 May (7:30 pm)	Frankston 5.17 (47)	def. by	Footscray 19.14 (128)	SkyBus Stadium	Report
Saturday, 22 May (11:05 am)	Brisbane 12.8 (80)	def. by	Richmond 21.16 (142)	The Gabba	Report
Saturday, 22 May (1:30 pm)	Aspley 12.10 (82)	def. by	Sandringham 14.9 (93)	Graham Road Oval	Report
Saturday, 22 May (2:05 pm)	Greater Western Sydney 11.9 (75)	def.	Port Melbourne 9.12 (66)	Blacktown ISP Oval	Report
Saturday, 22 May (2:05 pm)	Essendon 11.4 (70)	def. by	North Melbourne 12.13 (85)	Windy Hill	Report
Sunday, 23 May (12:05 pm)	Carlton 6.10 (46)	def. by	Box Hill 19.16 (130)	Ikon Park	Report
Sunday, 23 May (2:00 pm)	Casey 12.13 (85)	def.	Sydney 6.9 (45)	Casey Fields	Report
Sunday, 23 May (2:05 pm)	Northern Bullants 3.5 (23)	def. by	Werribee 27.21 (183)	Preston City Oval	Report
	Bye; Collingwood, Williamstown
This was Frankston's 1000th senior VFA/VFL match.; Werribee's 160-point victory over the Northern Bullants set a new record as its greatest winning margin in its first division history, and its second greatest winning margin of all time. The Bullants' loss was equal-heaviest in its history to that time, matching the record originally set in Round 18, 1911. Both records were broken when the teams met the following year in Round 22, 2022.

=== Round 7 ===
Round 7 (cancelled)
Round 7, to have been played between 27 May and 30 May, was cancelled due to the May 28–11 June Victorian COVID-19 snap lockdown.

=== Round 8 ===
	Round 8
5 June (10:05 am)	Sydney 10.13 (73)	def. by	Southport 12.16 (88)	Tramway Oval	Report
5 June (1:00 pm)	Aspley 14.13 (97)	def. by	Brisbane 14.14 (98)	Graham Road Oval	Report
All Round 8 matches involving Victorian clubs were again cancelled due to the May 28–11 June Victorian COVID-19 snap lockdown. Only two fixtures involving non-Victorian teams were played during the shortened round.

=== Round 9 ===
	Round 9
12 June (11:05 am)	Sydney 16.8 (104)	def. by	Gold Coast 17.5 (107)	Tramway Oval	Report
12 June (12:05 pm)	Greater Western Sydney 17.12 (114)	def.	Aspley 9.11 (65)	Blacktown ISP Oval	Report
All Round 9 matches involving Victorian clubs were again cancelled due to ongoing restrictions following the May 28–11 June Victorian COVID-19 snap lockdown. Only two fixtures involving non-Victorian teams were played during the shortened round.

=== Round 10 ===
	Round 10
18 June (4:10 pm)	Geelong 9.9 (63)	def. by	Footscray 14.12 (96)	GMHBA Stadium	Report
18 June (7:30 pm)	Frankston 13.15 (93)	def.	Northern Bullants 10.4 (64)	SkyBus Stadium (crowd: 0)	Report
19 June (12:00 pm)	North Melbourne 11.11 (77)	def.	Coburg 11.8 (74)	Arden Street Oval (crowd: 0)	Report
19 June (12:00 pm)	Southport 24.13 (157)	def.	Brisbane 7.8 (50)	Fankhauser Reserve	Report
19 June (12:00 pm)	Aspley 18.17 (125)	def. by	Gold Coast 19.17 (131)	Graham Road Oval	Report
19 June (12:05 pm)	Werribee 15.8 (98)	def.	Greater Western Sydney 7.8 (50)	Avalon Airport Oval (crowd: 0)	Report
19 June (1:00 pm)	Port Melbourne 10.8 (68)	def. by	Carlton 12.11 (83)	ETU Stadium (crowd: 0)	Report
20 June (11:05 am)	Essendon 7.9 (51)	def. by	Box Hill 15.12 (102)	Windy Hill (crowd: 0)	Report
20 June (2:10 pm)	Williamstown 11.8 (74)	drew with	Richmond 10.14 (74)	Downer Oval (crowd: 0)	Report
	Bye; Casey, Collingwood, Sandringham, Sydney
Matches in metropolitan Melbourne were played behind closed doors.

=== Round 11 ===
	Round 11
25 June (11:35 am)	Brisbane 8.6 (54)	def. by	Geelong 26.16 (172)	South Pine Sports Complex	Report
26 June (cancelled)	Gold Coast	v	Southport	Austworld Centre Oval
26 June (12:00 pm)	North Melbourne 14.4 (88)	def.	Werribee 12.11 (83)	Arden Street Oval	Report
26 June (12:00 pm)	Coburg 7.10 (52)	def. by	Footscray 13.6 (84)	Highgate Recreation Reserve	Report
26 June (12:05 pm)	Collingwood 16.8 (104)	def.	Frankston 9.11 (65)	Holden Centre	Report
26 June (12:30 pm)	Box Hill 15.19 (109)	def.	Aspley 7.5 (47)	Box Hill City Oval (crowd: 632)	Report
26 June (2:00 pm)	Sandringham 14.12 (96)	def.	Richmond 10.6 (66)	Trevor Barker Oval	Report
27 June (12:00 pm)	Casey 13.14 (92)	def.	Essendon 6.8 (44)	Casey Fields	Report
27 June (1:05 pm)	Northern Bullants 14.16 (100)	def.	Carlton 10.8 (68)	Preston City Oval	Report
27 June (2:00 pm)	Port Melbourne 6.14 (50)	def. by	Williamstown 12.15 (87)	ETU Stadium	Report
27 June (5:45 pm)	Greater Western Sydney 13.15 (93)	def.	Sydney 8.7 (55)	Holden Centre	Report
The match between Gold Coast and Southport was postponed to round 16 because of COVID-19 border restrictions implemented by the Queensland Government.

=== Round 12 ===
	Round 12
2 July (4:10 pm)	Geelong 16.6 (102)	def.	Essendon 3.9 (27)	GMHBA Stadium	Report
3 July (11:00 am)	Box Hill 15.21 (111)	def.	Gold Coast 5.9 (39)	Box Hill City Oval (crowd: 774)	Report
3 July (1:00 pm)	Coburg 15.9 (99)	def.	Carlton 9.8 (62)	Piranha Park	Report
3 July (2:00 pm)	Northern Bullants 8.7 (55)	def.	Richmond 5.12 (42)	Preston City Oval	Report
3 July (7:30 pm)	Casey 7.12 (54)	def. by	Greater Western Sydney 8.7 (55)	Casey Fields	Report
4 July (12:00 pm)	Collingwood 11.15 (81)	def.	Sandringham 10.3 (63)	Holden Centre	Report
4 July (12:05 pm)	Footscray 10.7 (67)	def.	North Melbourne 8.8 (56)	Victoria University Whitten Oval	Report
4 July (6:30 pm)	Sydney 6.8 (42)	def. by	Frankston 9.18 (72)	Avalon Airport Oval	Report
	Bye; Aspley, Brisbane, Port Melbourne, Southport, Werribee, Williamstown

=== Round 13 ===
	Round 13
Friday 9 July (7:30 pm)	Frankston 18.14 (122)	def.	Port Melbourne 4.3 (27)	Skybus Stadium	Report
Saturday 10 July (12:00 pm)	Williamstown 10.11 (71)	def. by	Geelong 12.11 (83)	Downer Oval	Report
Saturday 10 July (1:00 pm)	Greater Western Sydney 13.15 (93)	def.	Gold Coast 7.11 (53)	ETU Stadium	Report
Saturday 10 July (1:05 pm)	Werribee 7.15 (57)	def. by	Casey 17.14 (116)	Avalon Airport Oval	Report
Sunday 11 July (11:05 am)	Footscray 11.18 (84)	def.	Sydney 11.11 (77)	VU Whitten Oval	Report
Sunday 11 July (12:00 pm)	Richmond 15.11 (101)	def. by	Collingwood 16.10 (106)	Swinburne Centre	Report
Sunday 11 July (12:05 pm)	Southport 20.15 (135)	def.	Brisbane 2.14 (26)	Fankhauser Reserve	Report
Sunday 11 July (1:00 pm)	Coburg 12.10 (82)	def. by	Northern Bullants 12.11 (83)	Piranha Park	Report
Sunday 11 July (2:00 pm)	Sandringham 21.11 (137)	def.	Essendon 10.10 (70)	Trevor Barker Oval	Report
	Bye; Aspley, Box Hill, Carlton, North Melbourne

=== Round 14 ===
Round 14 (cancelled)
Round 14, to have been played between 16-18 July 2021, was cancelled due to the 16-21 July Victorian COVID-19 lockdown.

=== Round 15 ===
	Round 15
Saturday, 24 July (11:00 am)	Aspley 6.8 (44)	def. by	Gold Coast 19.8 (122)	Graham Road Oval	Report
Sunday, 25 July (12:00 pm)	Southport 11.9 (75)	def.	Essendon 10.11 (71)	Fankhauser Reserve	Report
Sunday, 25 July (12:30 pm)	Greater Western Sydney 11.20 (86)	def.	Brisbane 8.11 (59)	Austworld Centre Oval	Report
Ongoing COVID-19 restrictions in Victoria and New South Wales meant that only three matches among teams who were, at the time, located in Queensland were played.; Mark McVeigh served as Greater Western Sydney's acting coach for this match because Luke Kelly was in isolation after attending a COVID-19 exposure site in Melbourne.

=== Round 16 ===
	Round 16
Saturday, 31 July (10:30 am)	Gold Coast 1.2 (8)	v	Southport 1.0 (6)	Austworld Centre Oval	Report
Saturday, 31 July (12:00 pm)	North Melbourne 11.11 (77)	def.	Port Melbourne 8.12 (60)	Arden Street Oval (crowd: 0)	Report
Saturday, 31 July (12:00 pm)	Sandringham 9.6 (60)	def. by	Carlton 14.25 (109)	Trevor Barker Beach Oval (crowd: 0)	Report
Saturday, 31 July (12:05 pm)	Collingwood 9.6 (60)	def. by	Box Hill 18.15 (123)	Holden Centre (crowd: 0)	Report
Saturday, 31 July (1:05 pm)	Casey 10.9 (69)	def. by	Footscray 16.10 (106)	Casey Fields (crowd: 0)	Report
Saturday, 31 July (2:00 pm)	Northern Bullants 10.11 (71)	def. by	Werribee 14.17 (101)	Preston City Oval (crowd: 0)	Report
Saturday, 31 July (cancelled)	Aspley	v	Essendon	Graham Road Oval	Report
Saturday, 31 July (cancelled)	Brisbane	v	Sydney	South Pine Sports Complex	Report
Sunday, 1 August (2:00 pm)	Coburg 9.15 (69)	def. by	Williamstown 10.13 (73)	Piranha Park (crowd: 0)	Report
Sunday, 1 August (2:05 pm)	Frankston 12.11 (83)	def. by	Richmond 14.15 (99)	SkyBus Stadium (crowd: 0)	Report
	Bye; Greater Western Sydney, Geelong
A snap COVID-19 lockdown affecting south-eastern Queensland was announced on the morning of Saturday 31 July to come into effect later that same day. The 10:30am match between Gold Coast and Southport was abandoned for no result after ten minutes of play, and the other two matches to have been held in Queensland were cancelled.; Matches in Victoria were played behind closed doors.

=== Round 17 ===
Round 17 (cancelled)
Round 17, to have been played between 7 and 8 August, was cancelled due to the August–October Victorian COVID-19 lockdown.

=== Round 18 ===
Round 18 (cancelled)
Round 18, to have been played between 14 and 15 August, was cancelled due to the August–October Victorian COVID-19 lockdown.

=== Round 19 ===
Round 19 (cancelled)
Round 19, to have been played between 21 and 22 August, was cancelled due to the August–October Victorian COVID-19 lockdown.

== Ladder ==
Pos	Team	Pld	W	L	D	PF	PA	PP	Pts	M/R	Qualification
1	Footscray (R)	10	10	0	0	976	575	169.7	40	100	Finals series (cancelled)
2	Southport	10	9	1	0	1168	651	180.7	36	90	Finals series (cancelled)
3	Box Hill	10	8	2	0	1085	647	167.7	32	80	Finals series (cancelled)
4	Geelong (R)	9	7	2	0	885	529	167.3	28	78	Finals series (cancelled)
5	Casey	9	7	2	0	818	491	166.6	28	78	Finals series (cancelled)
6	Williamstown	9	6	2	1	768	563	136.4	26	72	Finals series (cancelled)
7	Collingwood (R)	9	6	3	0	683	738	92.5	24	67	Finals series (cancelled)
8	Greater Western Sydney (R)	11	7	4	0	819	868	94.4	28	64	Finals series (cancelled)
9	Werribee	9	5	4	0	851	577	147.5	20	56	
10	Frankston	11	6	5	0	903	870	103.8	24	55	
11	Richmond (R)	10	4	5	1	822	795	103.4	18	45	
12	Carlton (R)	9	4	5	0	790	780	101.3	16	44	
13	Sandringham	9	4	5	0	755	801	94.3	16	44	
14	Gold Coast (R)	10	4	6	0	753	975	77.2	16	40	
15	North Melbourne (R)	10	4	6	0	578	1015	57.0	16	40	
16	Coburg	10	3	7	0	773	813	95.1	12	30	
17	Brisbane (R)	10	3	7	0	732	1115	65.7	12	30	
18	Northern Bullants	10	3	7	0	618	987	62.6	12	30	
19	Sydney (R)	10	2	8	0	721	811	88.9	8	20	
20	Essendon (R)	10	2	8	0	591	916	64.5	8	20	
21	Port Melbourne	9	1	8	0	565	839	67.3	4	11	
22	Aspley	10	1	9	0	806	1104	73.0	4	10	

Rules for classification: 1) match ratio; 2) points; 3) percentage; 4) number of points for.
(R) = Reserves

== Awards ==
- The J. J. Liston Trophy was not awarded due to the unequal number of games each team played.
- The Frosty Miller Medal was won by Matt Hammelmann (Aspley), who kicked 42 goals during the home-and-away season. In doing so, he became the first player from a wooden spooner to lead the VFA/VFL's goalkicking for a season.
- The Fothergill–Round–Mitchell Medal was won by Charlie Dean (Williamstown).

== See also ==
- 2021 VFL Women's season
