= University of Queensland Australian Football Club =

Coordinates: 27.5003°S 153.0189°E

University of Queensland

Names
- Full name: Red Lions Australian Rules Football Club (RLAFC) Inc
- Nickname(s): Red Lions, Students, Varsity
- Former nickname: Blues (1956-1959)
- Club song: "Drunk Last Night!"

Club details
- Founded: 1956; 70 years ago
- Colours: Maroon Blue Light Blue
- Competition: QFA Div 1 QFA Div 3 Brisbane North; QAFLW
- President: Sean Westerhuis
- Coach: Tom Corless
- Captain: Jordan Williams
- Premierships: QANFL/QAFL Second Tier (6): 1959; 1961; 1962; 1964; 1965; 1966; SQAFA Second Division (2): 1971; 1984; SQAFA/SEQAFL/QAFA/QFA Reserves (11): 1983; 1984; 1985; 1987; 2006; 2008; 2011; 2012; (Note: Both the Reserves and Fourths won SEQAFL Reserves premierships in 2012.); 2013; 2014; 2026; QFA Div 4 (1): 2024; QAFLW (2): 2021; 2022
- Ground: Playing Field 2, University of Queensland, Sir William MacGregor Dr, St Lucia, Brisbane.

Uniforms
Saturday Home	Saturday Away	Friday Night

Other information
- Official website: uqredlionsafc.com.au

The University of Queensland Australian Football Club (UQAFC) is an amateur Australian rules football club playing in the QFA Division 1 and Division 3 Brisbane North competitions, as well as the QAFLW, which are overseen by AFL Queensland. UQAFC home games are played at the University of Queensland's Playing Field 2, on the corner of Sir William MacGregor Drive and Thynne Road, St Lucia, Brisbane.

The UQAFC Men's Seniors team has won seven premierships, with their most successful period coming between 1959 and 1966, wherein they won six premierships in eight seasons in the second tier of the QANFL/QAFL, this included a "threepeat" in 1964, 1965 & 1966. They added to their premiership tally with an SQAFA Second Division flag in 1984, with their Reserves team also winning that season's flag. Their Reserves side has claimed eleven premierships, and enjoyed periods of sustained success in the 1980s and the new millennium.

The club has also fielded Thirds and Fourths teams in the 21st century. The Thirds were founded in 2006 and became UQAFC's designated Friday night side in 2015; winning their maiden premiership in 2024 after 19 seasons. The Fourths won three consecutive premierships in their six years of existence between 2009 and 2014. UQAFC's women's side was established in 2013 and competed in the SEQAFLW before moving to the newly established QWAFL the following year. The Red Lionesses won back-to-back senior premierships in 2021 and 2022.

== History ==
=== Formation and early years ===
Founded in 1956, the club began its existence playing in the QANFL "Second 18" competition.

=== 2006-2014: Growth and reserve grade dominance ===
==== Formation of Thirds and Fourths sides ====
In 2006 a large increase in player numbers resulted in the formation of a men's Thirds side. The Thirds team, which also included players from the Griffith University Gladiators, played in the reserves competition of Division 2 of the newly formed SEQAFL competition. 2009 represented another year of growth for the club, with unprecedented player numbers allowing the creation of a men's Fourths side for the first time, which persisted for six seasons.

==== Reserve side success ====
The 9 seasons from 2006 to 2014 represented a highly successful period for UQAFC's men's reserve sides, with the Seconds and Fourths securing 7 flags for the club, including a "threepeat" by the Fourths team in 2012, 2013 and 2014.

==== 2011-2012: Seniors make consecutive grand finals ====
In 2011 and 2012 the men's Seniors side had their best chance in decades at ending their flag drought. They dominated the competition in both years, finishing as minor premiers with 15–2 and 14–2 win-loss records respectively. However, they could not convert this dominance into premiership glory, as they were defeated both times in the grand final at the hands of Coorparoo.

After these two grand final defeats, the Senior side's performance declined sharply in the next few years. Following the AFLQ's decision to re-structure their South East Queensland competitions for 2014, the Red Lions Senior side joined the newly re-formed QAFL. UQAFC's new women's side also moved from the SEQAFLW to the QAFLW.

=== 2015-2020: Rebuilding ===
This period saw both the men's Seniors and Reserves struggle, finishing between 7th and 10th most years, and finals seemed a distant reality. The Thirds made the QAFA (B) Central Grand Final in 2016, but lost to Zillmere by 33 points. After that, they too fell down the ladder for an extended period. The women's Senior side made it to two preliminary finals, but neither they nor their reserves managed to reach a grand final.

In 2015, UQAFC's Fourths side was disbanded and their Thirds side became a standalone Friday night side. After further restructuring of the AFLQ competition structure in 2017, the Red Lions men's Senior team left the QAFL and joined the new QFA Division 1 competition. The Thirds also moved from the QAFA to the new QFA Div 4 competition.

=== 2020s: Return to finals & maiden premierships ===
The 2020s saw a return to competitiveness for all UQAFC sides, with both the men's seniors and reserves returning to finals for the first time in a decade.

==== Women's Seniors go back-to-back ====
The women's senior team dominated the competition in the 2021 and 2022 seasons, with coach Ross Clayfield delivering the side's first taste of premiership success with back-to-back QAFLW flags. In 2021 they faced Bond University in the premiership decider. The Bull Sharks jumped out of the blocks and led at half-time, but the Red Lionesses rallied in the second half for a dominant 40-point win. In 2022 they faced Southport, and found themselves a goal down at the final change; but Ava Seton kicked truly in the dying minutes to send the game to extra time. Just moments into extra time, Megan Hunt's clearing kick to the goal square was brought to ground by Jess Stellard, who beat her defender and kicked the winning goal. The Red Lionesses held on for the next few minutes to win by 7 points in an all-time QAFLW classic.

==== Consecutive prelims for Men's Seniors ====
After winning the wooden spoon in 2023, the men's Seniors surged up the ladder and pushed deep into finals. They lost consecutive preliminary finals in 2024 and 2025, falling short of reaching the premiership decider both times, denying them a chance to end their 41-year flag drought.

In 2026 however, the Seniors were able to get over the hump and defeat Springwood at BAM to make the big dance and a shot at ending a 42-year flag drought. Unfortunately, they weren't able to prevent a rampaging Mayne at Hickey Park on their way to a three-peat, forcing the Red Lions to wait at least another year.

==== Thirds win maiden premiership ====
The Red Lions Thirds side also returned to finals after a number of years in the wilderness, and in 2023 qualified for the second grand final in their history with a thrilling 3-point preliminary final victory over bitter rivals Ferny Grove, that was decided by a kick after the siren. The following week they faced Caloundra in the grand final, but lost by 14 points in a low-scoring affair in which Caloundra dominated the play.

The following season saw outgoing coach Peter Rosengren be replaced by assistant coach Brett Hayes. In his first season, they finished minor premiers and played Glasshouse Hinterland in the 2024 Div 4 North Grand Final. The game was a tense and low-scoring affair, and despite wasteful goalkicking and a late surge from the opposition, the Red Lions held on to win by 7 points, securing the side's maiden premiership in a thrilling finish.

==== Men's Reserves make grand final ====
After three consecutive preliminary final appearances, the Reserves side was finally victorious, earning the right to play in the 2025 Div 1 Reserves Grand Final. They faced Springwood and battled hard to keep scores level at half time, but kicked just 2 goals to 11 in the second half and lost by 55 points.

Men's Reserves win 2026 Premiership

After a highly successful season which finished with a 15-1 record with over 300%, the Qualifying final against Caloundra went down to the wire with the Red Lions even trailing by more than a goal halfway through the last quarter before a comeback win saw the Reserves GF appearance confirmed. In the Grand Final against Mayne, UQ struggled early on going into the halftime break trailing by 10 points before a 20-point turnaround in a low scoring game in the third delivered a 10-point lead and the promise of a massive finish to end the third term. Mayne started with a quick goal before a costly 50 metre penalty and big Connor Wadsworth goal delivered the Lions an 11-point lead with just 10 minutes remaining. Despite a late scare through a Mayne goal and shot at goal that just went over the post, the Red Lions were able to hold on for a massive win by just 4 points.

	University	Mayne
Q1	1.1.7	2.4.16
Q2	2.2.14	3.6.24
Q3	6.5.41	4.7.31
Q4	7.6.48	6.8.44
Bests	S.Walsh, S.Hele, F.Boorer, C.Wadsworth, M.Lowe, R.Daniskevicius	C.Burger, J.Geurts, C.Antonio, P.Glass, O.Reeves, B.Tanglao
Goals	D.Milne (3), A.Andreyev (2), C.Horrocks, C.Wadsworth	B.Wilkinson (2), D.Evans, C.Massingham, C.Pett, O.Reeves
Awards	B.O.G - S.Walsh	Competition Leading Goalkicker - J.Stephens (43) (UQ)

== Club identity ==
=== Nickname ===
The club adopted its Red Lions nickname from the Red Lion Tavern in the Northern New South Wales town of Glencoe. The pub was frequented by club members before and after their annual pre-season match against the University of New England in Armidale.

=== Song ===
"Drunk Last Night!" is the team song of the University of Queensland Australian Football Club. The club uses a version of the lyrics commonly sung by university teams. The lyrics are as follows:

Drunk last night, drunk the night before
We're gonna get drunk tonight, like we've never been drunk before
'Cause here we are, happy as can be
We are the boys of the varsity
Glorious, victorious, one keg of beer between the four of us
Thank God there are no more of us
'Cause one of us could drink the bloody lot, without his pants on
One of us could drink the bloody lot, roll over Mabel
Your navel's on the other side
Goosh goosh goosh!

== Rivalries ==
=== Coorparoo ===
==== Early history ====
As two large inner-Brisbane clubs, separated by just 4 km, UQ and Coorparoo have been intense local rivals since the club's early days. Within the first 8 years of UQAFC's establishment, the two clubs had already met in the 1961 and 1964 grand finals of the QANFL's second-tier competition, with the Red Lions emerging victors by 87 and 63 points respectively. With the establishment of the SQAFA in 1970, UQ moved to the new competition, with Coorparoo staying in the QAFL, leading to an extended hiatus in regular fixtures between the clubs.

Suffering under significant financial strain in 1993, the Roo's left the QAFL and joined the Red Lions in the Brisbane Australian Football League (BAFL) for the 1994 and 1995 seasons, before the club folded in 1996. The establishment of a new Coorparoo club in 1999 ensured that the clubs would continue to face each other on a regular basis in the new millennium.

==== Recent finals ====
The Kings defeated the Red Lions in consecutive grand finals in 2011 and 2012 and denied the men's Seniors from ending their lengthy premiership drought. Both results were considered significant upsets, as the Red Lions had dominated both seasons and finished minor premiers. The two clubs would meet again in the 2024 preliminary final of the QFA Division 1 Seniors competition, with Coorparoo winning by 26 points. UQAFC's women's senior side faced Coorparoo in the 2018 QWAFL Seniors preliminary final, with Coorparoo winning by 16 points.

The Red Lions Thirds side has also faced Coorparoo's Thirds and Fourths sides in a number of seasons in the 2010s and 2020s. The Kings emerged 25-point elimination final victors over the Friday night Red Lions team in the 2021 QFA Div 4 season. The Coorparoo Fourths would also thwart the UQAFC Thirds team's attempt to win back-to-back premierships. The Red Lions travelled to Giffin Park for their final match of the 2025 QFA Division 3 Brisbane North home-and-away season, needing a victory to secure a place in the finals; unless Aspley was able to defeat Mayne in the same round. Despite their status as significant underdogs, Coorparoo rose to the occasion, and they led the score for virtually the entire match, with UQ kicking a wasteful 3.10 despite dominating much of the play. A goal from Darcy Stevens in the dying seconds of the match was able to salvage a draw for the visitors, but the result was of no help to the Red Lions, and they missed finals as a result, ending their season.

These matches in recent years have greatly contributed to a renewed rivalry with the spiritual successors of the original Coorparoo club. Since 2011, Coorparoo has a 5-0 record against UQ in finals.

=== Ferny Grove ===
==== Early history ====
Despite only fielding its first senior side in 2015, the Ferny Grove Falcons have developed a significant rivalry with UQAFC's men's Thirds team, having frequently faced each other in various QFA Friday night competitions.

The two teams faced each other for the first time in Ferny Grove's debut senior season, with both sides playing in the QAFA B Central division in 2015 and 2016. Following the reorganisation of AFLQ's competition structure, the two teams would play in different competitions, with UQAFC competing in the QFA's fourth division, whereas Ferny Grove was assigned to the fifth division. Due to this change, the two teams would not face each other again until the fifth division was eliminated heading into the 2020 season. UQAFC and Ferny Grove were placed together in Division 4 North when AFLQ divided the competition in 2022.

The Red Lions dominated early on, with UQ winning the first seven matches between the two clubs. Ferny Grove defeated the Red Lions Friday night side for the first time in the final round of the 2022 home-and-away season, more than seven years after the first match between the two teams.

==== 2023 QFA Division 4 North Season ====
The 2023 season saw the rivalry between the two clubs reach new heights, with the two sides facing each other five times over the course of the season. Of note was not only the unusually high number of games between the sides, but the fact that in every match, the away team was victorious. The matches were defined by consistently close finishes, with all five matches being decided by less than 3 goals, and an average winning margin of 8 points.

For the first week of finals, the Falcons travelled to the home ground of the Red Lions and faced them in the first qualifying final. Despite their considerable underdog status, they emerged victors by 13 points.

The two sides would face each other again in the preliminary final at Ferny Grove Oval. In yet another intense and see-sawing affair, UQ overcame a 7-point deficit at three-quarter time to lead by four points, but a mark taken by Ferny Grove two seconds before the siren sounded gave them the chance to kick to win the game. The kick for goal was hooked and UQ won by three points.

==== Recent history ====
UQAFC and Ferny Grove have continued to face each other in QFA Friday night fixtures in recent years, with both sides currently playing in the QFA Division 3 Brisbane North competition. UQ currently holds a 13-3 win-loss record against the Falcons as of the end of the 2025 season.

== Significant matches ==
=== Men's Seniors ===
==== UQ v Yeronga, 1959 QANFL Second 18 Grand Final ====
The first grand final in the club's history would see them face the Devils in what was characterised as a "fast moving match in which the lead changed many times".

At the end of the first quarter, UQ held a three-goal lead, but the second quarter saw Yeronga use the wind to their advantage, narrowing the margin to just four points at half time. The third quarter was a see-sawing affair, and going into the last quarter the Red Lions held a narrow lead, with the wind once again favouring Yeronga.

At three-quarter-time, UQ coach Tom Keay instructed his team to open up the forward line and play close to their man across the entire ground. The primary beneficiary of this was UQ captain and league Best and Fairest winner Mal Nairn, who kicked 6 goals for the match, many of them coming in the last quarter. This match-winning tactical change allowed UQ to dominate the final quarter and secure their maiden premiership. UQ 13.20 (98) defeated Yeronga 9.11 (65) by 33 points.

==== UQ v Zillmere, 1961 QANFL Reserves Grand Final ====
UQ finished the 1961 season as minor premiers, and faced Zillmere in the second semi-final. The Foxes defeated the Red Lions by ten points in a close and hard-fought game, and after defeating Kedron in the preliminary final, UQ would face them again in the premiership decider the following week.

Heavy winds played a significant role in the match, and using this fact to their advantage, UQ opened up a six-goal lead by quarter-time. In the second quarter, it was Zillmere's turn to kick with the wind, but UQ's strong backline ensured that they still led by three goals at the main break. UQ were not able to repeat their blistering start to the game when play resumed after half time, but still held a six goal lead going into the final quarter. Zillmere scored two quick goals early in the quarter, but the defence of the Red Lions, led by captain Tony Burge, was able to restrict any further majors. As the final quarter continued, UQ dominated the play but found themselves unable to convert their opportunities, until a goal by Mike Back effectively sealed Zillmere's fate. UQ 12.15 (87) defeated Zillmere 7.13 (55) by 32 points.

=== Men's Thirds ===
==== Ferny Grove v UQ, 2023 QFA Div 4 North Preliminary Final ====
UQ and Ferny Grove met each other in the preliminary final having faced each other four times already that season for a 2-2 record. The previous matches were defined by close finishes and an intense physicality. The match was hotly contested with several lead changes, and at half-time the scores were level. The intense contest that defined the first half continued into the second, and at the final change, the Falcons held a 7-point lead. UQ dominated the play in the fourth quarter and kicked an inaccurate 2.6 to give themselves a 10-point lead in the dying stages of the match.

A 50-metre penalty to Ferny Grove brought them within 4 points with less than a minute of game time remaining. Ferny Grove won the ensuing centre clearance, but a spoil from veteran UQ defender Shannon Brown denied them a mark close to goal. UQ's kick out of defence was turned over, and Ferny Grove immediately kicked inside 50 and found a mark 30 metres out directly in front of goal. Two seconds later, the siren sounded to signal the end of the match, giving Ferny Grove the chance to kick a goal after the siren to win the preliminary final. However, the kick for goal was hooked badly, and only a behind was registered. UQ 8.11 (59) defeated Ferny Grove 8.8 (56) by three points.

== Premierships ==
=== Men's Seniors ===
- QANFL/QAFL Second Tier (6)
  - Second Eighteen
    - 1959 – University of Queensland 13.20 (98) def. Yeronga 9.11 (65)
    - 1961 – University of Queensland 22.13 (145) def. Coorparoo 8.10 (58)
  - Reserves
    - 1962 – University of Queensland 12.15 (87) def. Zillmere 7.13 (55)
    - 1964 – University of Queensland 20.20 (140) def. Coorparoo 12.5 (77)
  - Reserves "A" Division
    - 1965 – University of Queensland 14.20 (104) def. Sandgate 12.12 (84)
    - 1966 – University of Queensland 21.20 (146) def. Sandgate 11.9 (75)
- SQAFA (1)
  - Second Division Seniors
    - 1984 – University of Queensland 25.14 (164) def. Everton 9.6 (60)

=== Men's Reserves ===
- SQAFA (5)
  - Second Division
    - 1971 – University of Queensland 12.25 (97) def. Yeronga 7.10 (52)
  - Second Division Reserves
    - 1983 – University of Queensland 14.16 (100) def. Ashgrove 10.12 (72)
    - 1984 – University of Queensland 10.15 (75) def. Springwood 10.12 (72)
  - First Division Reserves
    - 1985 – University of Queensland 14.10 (94) def. Wynnum 7.10 (52)
    - 1987 – University of Queensland 9.9 (63) def. Yeronga 7.14 (56)
- Queensland State Association (4)
  - Premier Division Reserves
    - 2006 – University of Queensland 7.6 (48) def. Yeronga 1.11 (17)
  - Division 1 Reserves
    - 2008 – University of Queensland 19.13 (127) def. Alexandra Hills 3.4 (22)
    - 2011 – University of Queensland 9.9 (63) def. Caloundra 6.7 (43)
    - 2026 - University of Queensland 7.6.48 def. Mayne 6.8.43
- SEQAFL (1)
  - Division 2 Reserves
    - 2012 – University of Queensland 13.6 (84) def. Coorparoo 10.5 (65)

=== Men's Thirds ===
- QFA (1)
  - Division 4 North
    - 2024 – University of Queensland 5.13 (43) def. Glasshouse Hinterland 5.6 (36)

=== Men's Fourths ===
- SEQAFL (3)
  - Division 3 Reserves
    - 2012 – University of Queensland 9.12 (66) def. Ipswich Eagles 8.8 (56)
    - 2013 – Coomera 14.8 (92) def. by University of Queensland 16.7 (103)
  - QAFA (A) Reserves (1)
    - 2014 – University of Queensland 12.8 (80) def. Carrara 10.5 (65)

=== Women's Seniors ===
- QAFLW
  - 2021 – University of Queensland 15.5 (95) def. Bond University 8.7 (55)
  - 2022 – University of Queensland 5.1 (31) def. Southport 3.6 (24) after extra time

== Alumni ==
The club's alumni include:

- Ken Crooke, former President of the National Party's Queensland branch
- John Harms, sports writer
- Malcolm Nairn, inaugural Vice-Chancellor of Charles Darwin University
- Steve Haddan, channel 9 news reader
- Ozzie Moore, former PGA Pro golfer
- Wayne Swan, Former Deputy Prime Minister & Federal Treasurer

AFL Players

- Scott Clouston, former player with the Brisbane Lions who came from the UQ Bulldogs Under 18s in 2005
- Ben Hudson, player for the Brisbane Lions, former player of Western Bulldogs and Adelaide Crows
- Andrew McKay, premiership player for the Carlton Blues trained with University whilst studying veterinary science.
- John Williams, former player with the Essendon Bombers who played with the UQ Bulldogs Under 18s and the senior Red Lions in 2006

AFLW Players

- Greta Bodey
- Gabby Collingwood
- Dakota Davidson
- Nat Grider
- Megan Hunt
- Breanna Koenen
- Maria Moloney
- Emma Pittman
- Sharni Webb
- Luka Yoshida-Martin
- Emma Zielke

== See also ==
- University of Queensland
- University of Queensland Union (UQU)
- Queensland Australian Football League
- Queensland Football Association
