= Hammelmann =

Hammelmann is a surname. Notable people with the surname include:

- Andrew Hammelmann (born 1966), Australian cricketer
- Matthew Hammelmann (born 1996), Australian rules footballer
