= Liam Dawson (footballer) =

Australian rules footballer

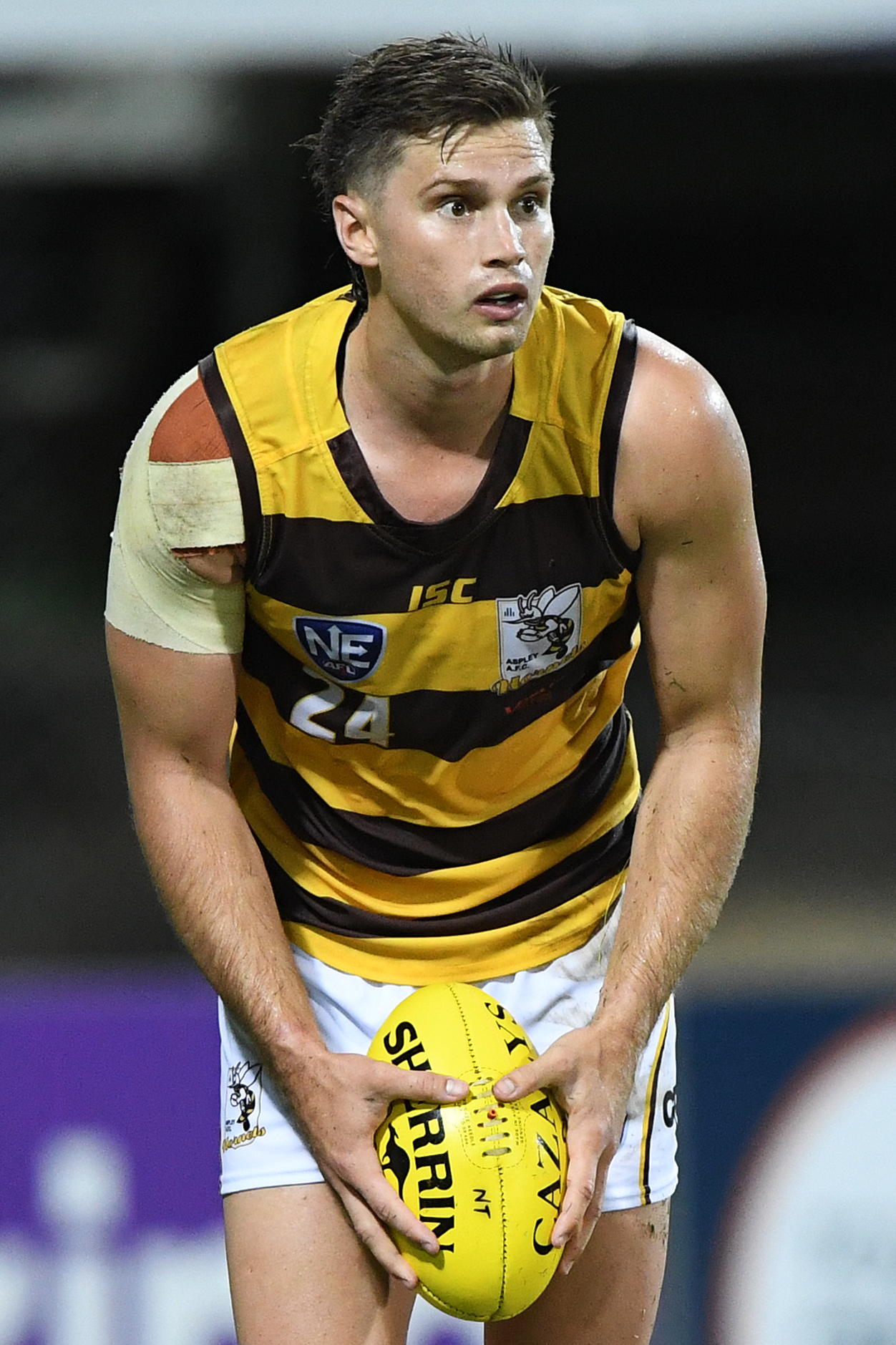
- Dawson in May 2019

Personal information
- Full name: Liam Dawson
- Born: 23 January 1996 (age 30)
- Original team: Aspley (NEAFL)
- Draft: No. 44, 2014 AFL draft
- Height: 189 cm (6 ft 2 in)
- Weight: 85 kg (187 lb)
- Position: Half-back / Midfield

Playing career^{1}
Years	Club	Games (Goals)
2015–2018	Brisbane Lions	18 (6)
- ^{1} Playing statistics correct to the end of 2018.

Liam Dawson is a former Australian rules footballer who played for the Brisbane Lions in the Australian Football League (AFL). He made his AFL debut in round 8, 2015 against Essendon at Etihad Stadium. Dawson was delisted by the Lions at the end of the 2018 season, having played 18 games.

Dawson was born in Australia to an English mother (and Australian rules umpire). He played in the Redcliffe juniors, then Aspley juniors at age 16, before debuting for the senior Hornets at age 17. He represented Queensland at under 18 level. Dawson was part of the Lions Academy and the AFL Academy and was part of the AIS-AFL Europe tour.

Freeman kicked 5 goals for Aspley in the club's winning 2023 QAFL Grand Final.
