= Reuben William =

Australian rules footballer (born 1997)

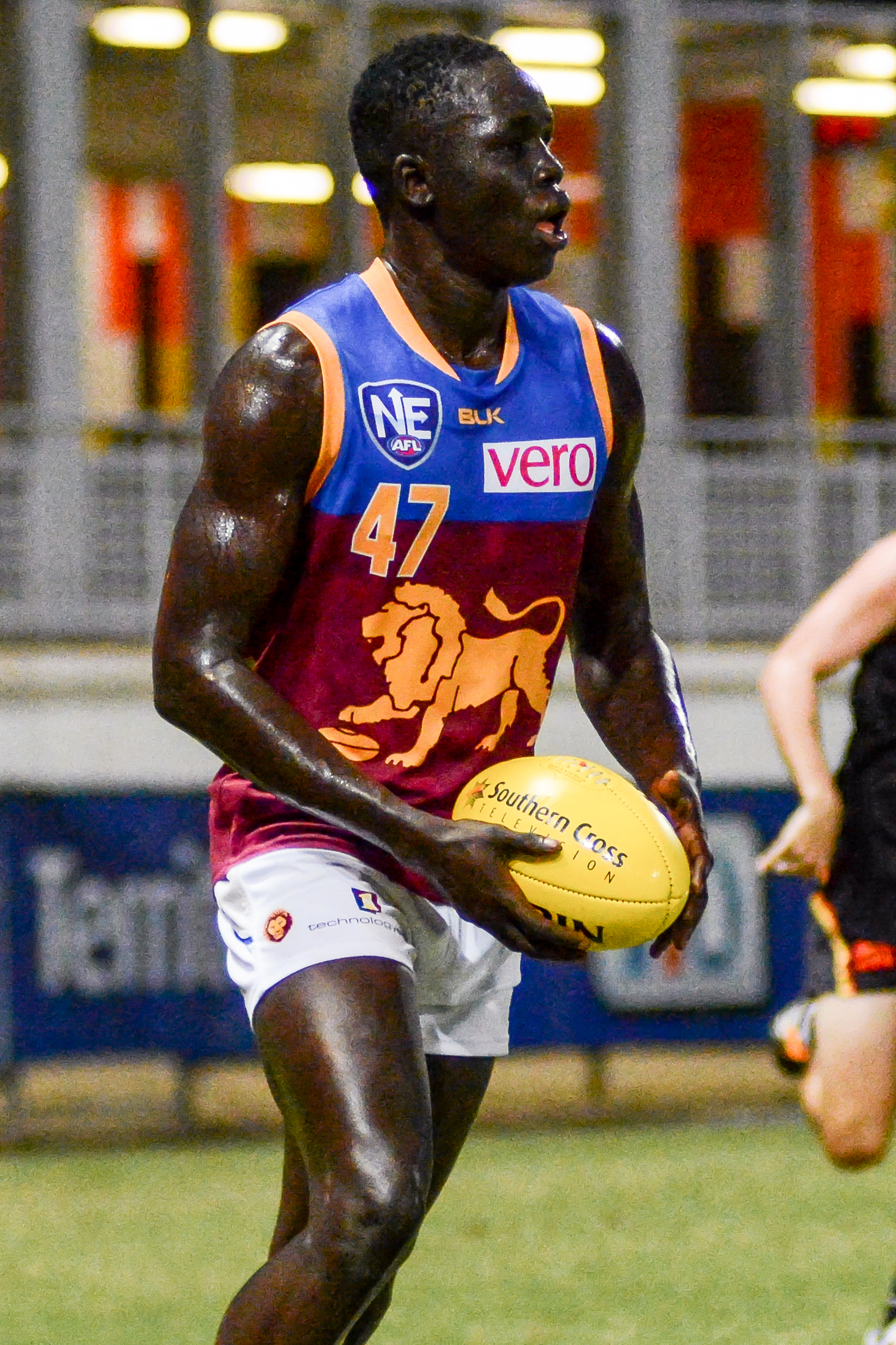
- William playing for Brisbane reserves in 2016

Personal information
- Nickname: Reubs
- Born: 31 December 1997 (age 28); Wau, South Sudan
- Original team: Zillmere (QAFL)
- Draft: No. 20, 2016 rookie draft
- Debut: Round 16, 2016, Brisbane Lions vs. Gold Coast, at Metricon Stadium
- Height: 189 cm (6 ft 2 in)
- Weight: 87 kg (192 lb)
- Position: Defender

Playing career^{1}
| Years | Club | Games (Goals) |
| 2016–2017 | Brisbane Lions | 3 (0) |
- ^{1} Playing statistics correct to the end of 2017.

Reuben William (born 31 December 1997) is a former professional Australian rules footballer who played for the Brisbane Lions in the Australian Football League (AFL). He moved to Australia from South Sudan at the age of four.

He was drafted by the Brisbane Lions with their second selection and twentieth overall in the 2016 rookie draft. He made his debut in the 26-point loss against Gold Coast in round 16, 2016 at Metricon Stadium. In October 2017, he was delisted by Brisbane.

William played for Redland-Victoria Point in the club's losing 2023 QAFL Grand Final.

In 2024, William joined Werribee in the Victorian Football League.
