= Jonathan Freeman (footballer) =

Australian rules footballer

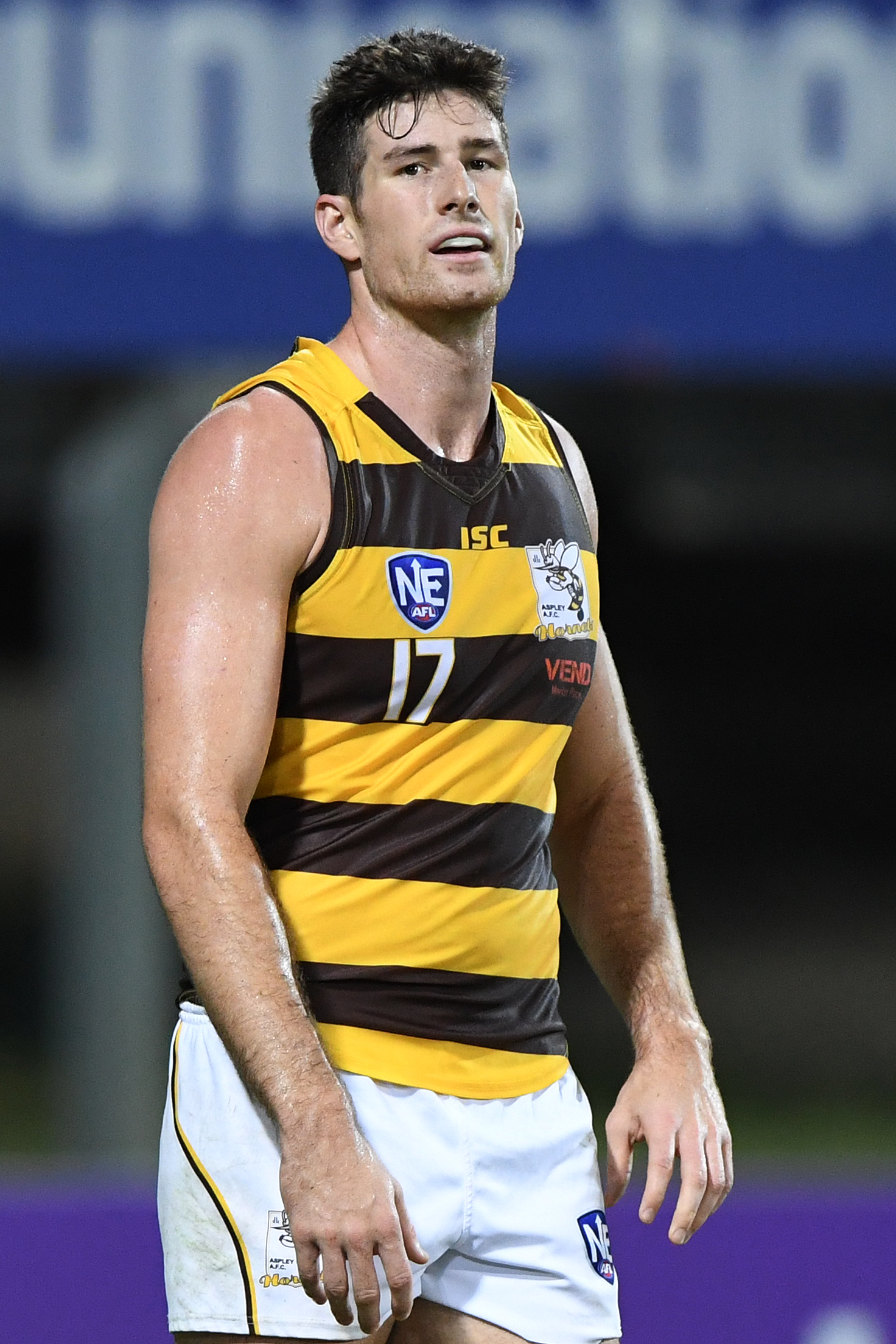
- Freeman in May 2019

Personal information
- Full name: Jonathan Freeman
- Nicknames: Jono, Freeza
- Born: 27 April 1994 (age 32)
- Original team: Noosa Tigers
- Draft: No. 62, 2013 national draft
- Height: 199 cm (6 ft 6 in)
- Weight: 98 kg (216 lb)
- Position: Full-forward

Playing career^{1}
Years	Club	Games (Goals)
2011–2012	Noosa (QFA)	2 (1)
2011–2013	Brisbane (NEAFL)	9 (3)
2013	Aspley (NEAFL)	2 (2)
2014–2017	Brisbane Lions	14 (16)
2018–2019	Aspley (NEAFL)	39 (81)
2020	East Perth (WAFL)	3 (2)
2021	Aspley (VFL)	8 (5)
2021–2022	Noosa (QAFL)	19 (36)
2023	Aspley (QAFL)	18 (33)
2024–	Noosa (QAFL)	17 (49)
- ^{1} Playing statistics correct to the end of 2024.

Jonathan Freeman (born 27 April 1994) is a former professional Australian rules footballer who played for the Brisbane Lions in the Australian Football League (AFL).

== Early life ==
Before his AFL career, Freeman was a part of Brisbane's Academy program, which would give Brisbane priority access to him when it came time for him to be drafted. Though he was eligible for the 2012 AFL draft and a physical fit to play as a key forward, he was overlooked by every club due to issues with his marking ability. Academy coach Ashley Drake attributed this to eye problems, similar to former Lions player Alastair Lynch, and Freeman consulted an eye doctor to help fix the issue. At the 2013 AFL draft, Adelaide attempted to draft him with pick 42, but as he was in Brisbane's Academy program they were able to draft him with pick 59 instead, becoming the first person from the program to make it to Brisbane's senior list.

== Career ==
=== AFL ===
Freeman played most of the 2014 season in the NEAFL for Brisbane's reserves team as a key forward. He performed well enough to earn a debut in round 20 against Adelaide, the team who had tried to draft him. In his second game he kicked a career-high 4 goals against Collingwood and showed efficiency with the ball, locking down his position for the rest of the season. For the next three years, Freeman had regular injury problems, keeping him out of the senior side most of the time. He played just six AFL matches in 2015 and four in 2016, then he wasn't able to play a single AFL match in 2017. He was delisted at the conclusion of the 2017 season.

=== QAFL ===
Freeman kicked 5 goals for Aspley in the club's winning 2023 QAFL Grand Final.

== Statistics ==
Statistics are correct to the end of the 2017 season

Legend
G	Goals	K	Kicks	D	Disposals	T	Tackles
B	Behinds	H	Handballs	M	Marks

Season	Team	No.	Games	Totals							Averages (per game)						
Season	Team	No.	Games	G	B	K	H	D	M	T	G	B	K	H	D	M	T
2014	Brisbane Lions	34	4	6	3	11	9	20	8	3	1.5	0.8	2.8	2.3	5.0	2.0	0.8
2015	Brisbane Lions	34	6	7	3	22	22	44	20	2	1.2	0.5	3.7	3.7	7.3	3.3	0.3
2016	Brisbane Lions	34	4	3	5	16	8	24	11	8	0.8	1.3	4.0	2.0	6.0	2.8	2.0
2017	Brisbane Lions	34	0	—	—	—	—	—	—	—	—	—	—	—	—	—	—
Career			14	16	11	49	39	88	39	13	1.1	0.8	3.5	2.8	6.3	2.8	0.9
