= John Williams (Australian footballer, born 1988) =

Australian rules footballer

Personal information
- Full name: John Williams
- Born: 8 October 1988 (age 38)
- Original team: Morningside
- Draft: 5th overall, 2007 Pre-Season draft
- Height: 188 cm (6 ft 2 in)
- Weight: 83 kg (183 lb)
- Position: Utility

Playing career^{1}
Years	Club	Games (Goals)
2007–2010	Essendon	1 (0)
- ^{1} Playing statistics correct to the end of 2010.

John "Willy" Williams (born 8 October 1988) is a former Australian rules footballer who played for the Essendon Football Club in the Australian Football League (AFL). Williams was educated at Brisbane Grammar School and then at the University of Queensland where he learned the game after joining the University of Queensland Australian Football Club. After successful seasons in the Under 18 and Senior sides at UQ he moved to the Morningside Australian Football Club for a season (which included an appearance in the Queensland Under 21 representative side) before being drafted to Essendon. Williams spent most of his time with Essendon playing for their VFL-affiliate, the Bendigo Bombers. He made his debut in the final game of the 2008 season. After playing one senior match in four seasons, Williams was delisted by Essendon at the end of 2010.
