= Matthew Hammelmann =

Australian rules footballer (born 1996)

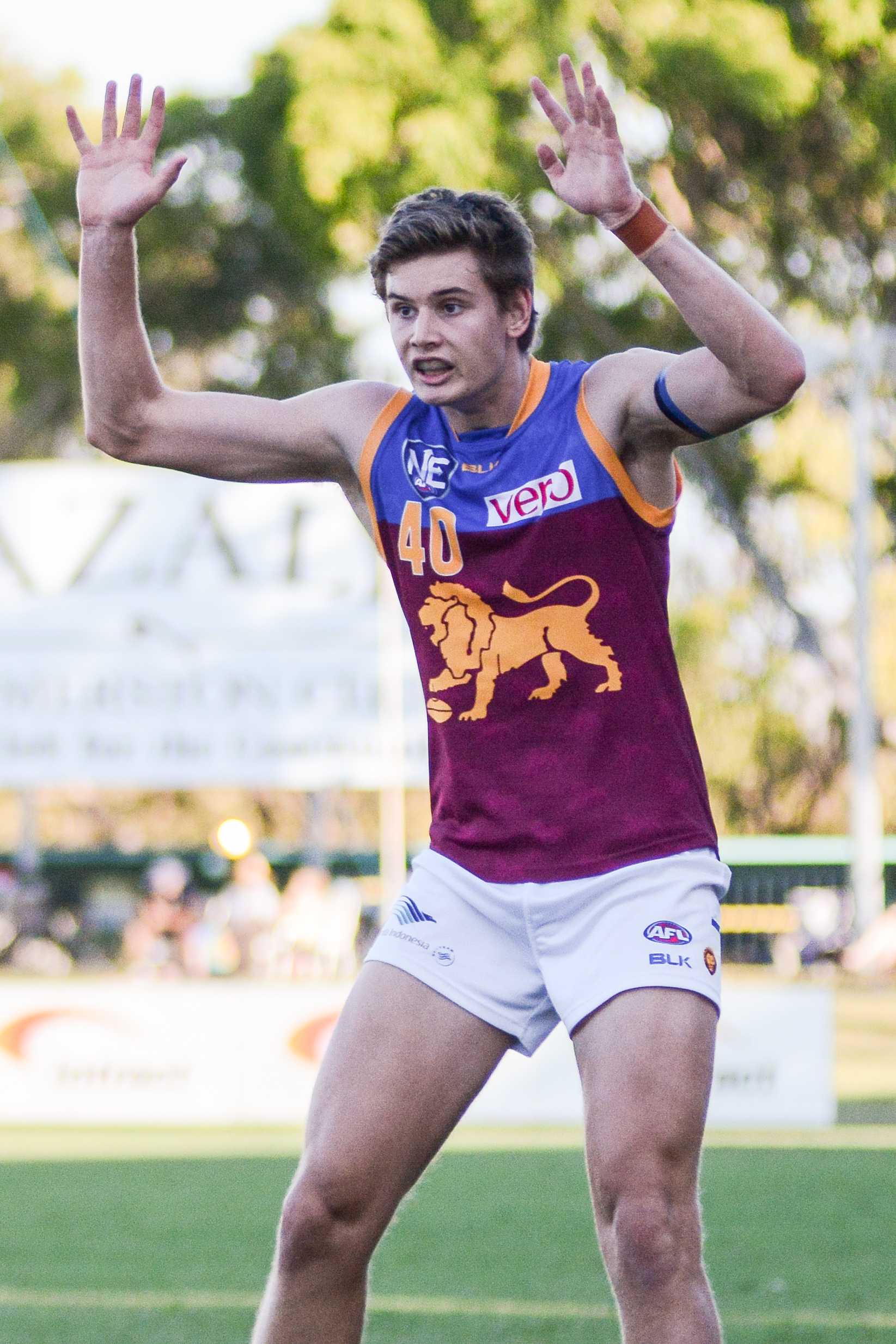
- Hammelmann in 2015

Personal information
- Nicknames: Hammer, Hammertime, Goober, Hamster
- Born: 8 March 1996 (age 30)
- Original team: Morningside (QAFL)
- Draft: No. 75, 2015 AFL rookie draft (Academy selection)
- Height: 1.97 m (6 ft 6 in)
- Weight: 88 kg (194 lb)
- Position: Utility

Playing career^{1}
Years	Club	Games (Goals)
2015–2017	Brisbane Lions	12 (2)
- ^{1} Playing statistics correct to the end of 2017.

Career highlights
- VFL: Jim 'Frosty' Miller Medal (2021); QAFL: Leading goalkicker (2023)

Matthew Hammelmann (born 8 March 1996) is an Australian rules footballer who played for the Brisbane Lions in the Australian Football League (AFL). He was drafted by the Brisbane Lions with its fourth selection and 75th overall in the 2015 AFL rookie draft.

== Career ==
Hammelmann debuted for Brisbane in a 42-point loss against Richmond in round 14, 2016.

In October 2017, he was delisted by Brisbane.

Hammelmann joined Aspley for the 2021 VFL season. He won the 'Frosty' Miller Medal as the leading goalkicker of the competition, kicking 42 goals from 10 matches.

In 2022, he joined Queensland Australian Football League (QAFL) club Redland-Victoria Point.

Hammelmann was the leading goalkicker in the 2023 QAFL season, kicking 106 goals. He kicked 5 goals in the club's Grand Final loss to Aspley the same year.
