= Sharni Webb =

Australian rules footballer

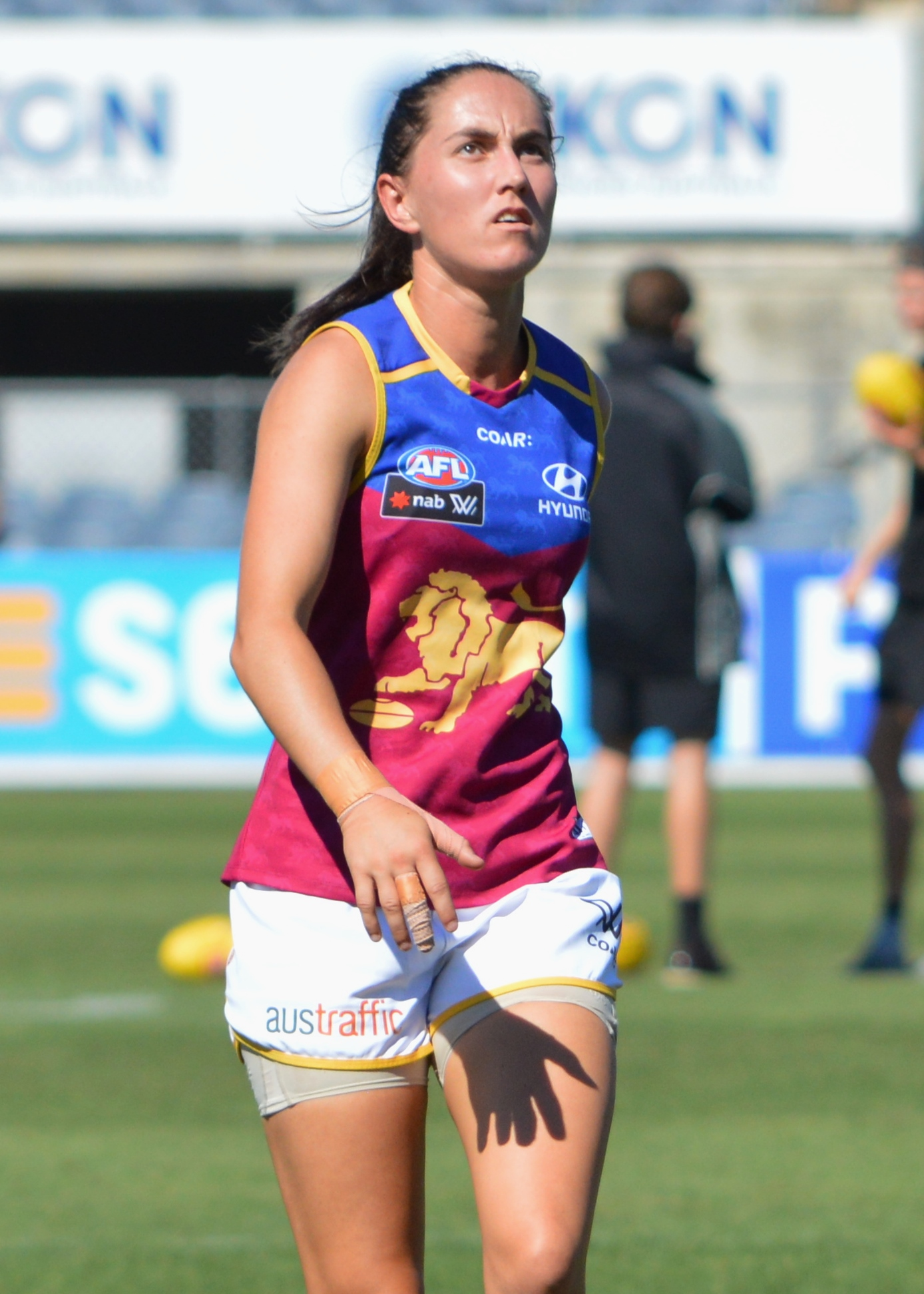
- Webb playing for Brisbane in March 2017

Personal information
- Born: 14 July 1991 (age 35); Nambour, Queensland
- Original team: University of Queensland (QWAFL)
- Draft: No. 111, 2016 AFL Women's draft
- Debut: Round 1, 2017, Brisbane vs. Melbourne, at Casey Fields
- Height: 172 cm (5 ft 8 in)
- Position: Centre half-forward/Ruck

Playing career^{1}
Years	Club	Games (Goals)
2017–2023	Brisbane	31 (1)
- ^{1} Playing statistics correct to the end of the 2023 season.

Sharni Webb (born 14 July 1991) is a former Australian rules footballer who played for Brisbane in the AFL Women's.

== Early life ==
Webb was born in Nambour, Queensland. Following encouragement from her brothers, Webb started out playing Australian rules football at the age of 15 in the Caloundra Women's League. After the league folded, she joined Zillmere Eagles in Brisbane. Webb played as a key position forward for the University of Queensland. From 2014, she acted as an assistant coach, as well as a player, due to her qualification as a physical education teacher. Even after being drafted to Brisbane, she continued playing for University of Queensland during the off-season, helping them reach the preliminary finals in 2018.

== AFLW career ==
Webb was recruited by Brisbane for the AFL Women's (AFLW) with pick number 111 in the 2016 AFL Women's draft. She made her debut in Brisbane's inaugural game against Melbourne at Casey Fields on 5 February 2017. Brisbane signed Webb for the 2018 season during the trade period in May 2017. For the 2018 season, she was elevated to the club's leadership group. In May 2018, Webb re-signed with Brisbane for the 2019 season. During the season, she had a stress fracture, which caused her to miss three games.

In April 2019, Webb was re-signed by Brisbane for the 2020 season. Following two years as part of the leadership group, she was named vice-captain for the season, under captain Emma Zielke. Webb reached the milestone of 25 AFLW games in the fifth round of the season. After missing the 2021 AFL Women's season due to pregnancy, she signed a one-year contract with the club, keeping her with Brisbane until the end of the 2022 season.

In May 2023, Webb was placed on the inactive list for the upcoming season due to an Achilles tendon injury suffered at training. Shortly after, in July, she announced her immediate retirement due to the injury. She finished her career having played 31 AFLW games.

== Statistics ==
Legend
G	Goals	K	Kicks	D	Disposals	T	Tackles
B	Behinds	H	Handballs	M	Marks	H/O	Hit-outs

Season	Team	No.	Games	Totals								Averages (per game)								Votes
Season	Team	No.	Games	G	B	K	H	D	M	T	H/O	G	B	K	H	D	M	T	H/O	Votes
2017	Brisbane	4	8	0	0	31	26	57	8	27	61	0.0	0.0	3.9	3.3	7.1	1.0	3.4	7.6	0
2018	Brisbane	4	8	1	2	30	28	58	8	17	37	0.1	0.3	3.8	3.5	7.3	1.0	2.1	4.6	0
2019	Brisbane	4	4	0	0	12	8	20	0	9	0	0.0	0.0	3.0	2.0	5.0	0.0	2.3	0.0	0
2020	Brisbane	4	7	0	0	23	25	48	6	15	2	0.0	0.0	3.3	3.6	6.9	0.9	2.1	0.3	0
2021	Brisbane	4	0	—	—	—	—	—	—	—	—	—	—	—	—	—	—	—	—	0
2022 (S6)	Brisbane	4	3	0	0	3	9	12	1	2	0	0.0	0.0	1.0	3.0	4.0	0.3	0.7	0.0	0
2022 (S7)	Brisbane	4	1	0	0	4	2	6	2	3	0	0.0	0.0	4.0	2.0	6.0	2.0	3.0	0.0	0
2023	Brisbane	—	0	—	—	—	—	—	—	—	—	—	—	—	—	—	—	—	—	0
Career			31	1	2	103	98	201	25	73	100	0.0	0.1	3.3	3.2	6.5	0.8	2.4	3.2	0

== Personal life ==
Webb was born in Nambour, Queensland. Besides playing football, Webb works full-time as a school teacher, teaching physical education. During the COVID-19 pandemic in Australia worked in online teaching with Ambrose Treacy College. In early 2018, Webb married her longtime partner, Andrew Maclean.
