= Craig Brittain =

Australian rules footballer

Personal information
- Full name: Craig Brittain
- Born: 6 June 1964 (age 62)
- Original team: Windsor-Zillmere
- Height: 178 cm (5 ft 10 in)
- Weight: 80 kg (176 lb)

Playing career^{1}
Years	Club	Games (Goals)
1984	North Melbourne	5 (2)
- ^{1} Playing statistics correct to the end of 1984.

Craig Brittain (born 6 June 1964) is a former Australian rules footballer who played with North Melbourne in the Victorian Football League (VFL).

Brittain, was born in Melbourne before moving to Cairns in his youth. He played senior football with North Cairns in the AFL Cairns competition and represented Queensland in the Teal Cup and was selected in the Under-18 tournament's "All-Australian" team. Although only 17, he was also a member of Windsor-Zillmere's QAFL premiership team that year.

The following season he joined North Melbourne and captained their Under-19s side. He played five senior games in 1984, his third year at the club, but knee problems limited his opportunities.

He continued at Windsor-Zillmere when he returned up north and in 1988 he captained the club to another premiership. The side was coached by his brother Wayne, the future Carlton coach. In 1988 he also won the Grogan Medal, by a considerable margin of 11 votes, from Ray Sarcevic. Windsor-Zillmere merged with Sandgate to form North Brisbane in the 1990s and he coached them to a first premiership in 1995. He joined his brother at Carlton in 2000 as a recruiter and scout but left after a year to coach the Brisbane Lions Reserves to the 2001 QAFL premiership. Involved with the Brisbane Lions ever since, Brittain has served in various roles including recruiting manager and development coach.
