= Graeme Allan =

Australian rules footballer

Personal information
- Full name: Graeme Allan
- Born: 23 July 1954 (age 72)
- Original team: Sunshine
- Height: 183 cm (6 ft 0 in)
- Weight: 83 kg (183 lb)
- Position: Centre/Utility

Playing career^{1}
Years	Club	Games (Goals)
1975–80	Fitzroy	87 (97)
1981–84, 1986	Collingwood	54 (29)
Total		141 (126)
- ^{1} Playing statistics correct to the end of 1986.

Graeme 'Gubby' Allan (born 23 July 1954) is a former Australian rules footballer who played with Fitzroy and Collingwood in the Victorian Football League (VFL).

Allan started his career in the Victorian Football Association where he took the field for Sunshine, and he finished third in the J. J. Liston Trophy count in 1974. He debuted at Fitzroy in 1975 and became a good utility player, often used as a centreman. He was also handy around goals and kicked 25 of them in 1977 and another 26 in 1979. Collingwood acquired his services in 1981 and he participated in that year's Grand Final, on the half back flank. During his time in the VFL he represented the league at interstate football.

Since retiring as a player, Allan has continued to be involved in football as an administrator, at Collingwood, Brisbane Lions, Greater Western Sydney and St Kilda Football Clubs.

His son, Marcus, played briefly at Brisbane, and now plays for the Old Xaverians in the VAFA, along with his youngest son, Patrick "Pat” Allan.
