= 2023 QAFL season =

112th season of the Queensland Australian Football League

- Teams: 12
- Premiers: Aspley; 2nd premiership
- Minor premiers: Aspley
- Grogan Medallist: Kwaby Boakye (Broadbeach − 21 votes)
- Ray Hughson Medallist: Matthew Hammelmann (Redland-VP − 106 goals)

The 2023 QAFL season was the 112th season of the Queensland Australian Football League (QAFL), the highest-level senior men's Australian rules football competition in Queensland. The season featured 12 clubs, beginning on 1 April and concluding on 16 September.

Aspley won the QAFL premiership for the second time and the second year in a row, defeating Redland-Victoria Point by 42 points in the 2023 QAFL Grand Final. It was Redland-Victoria Point's first senior grand final since the merged club joined the QAFL in 2021.

== Ladder ==
Pos	Team	Pld	W	L	D	PF	PA	PP	Pts	Qualification
1	Aspley (P)	18	15	2	1	1779	982	181.2	62	Finals series
2	Redland-Victoria Point	18	14	4	0	1865	1202	155.2	56	Finals series
3	Broadbeach	18	13	4	1	1636	1167	140.2	54	Finals series
4	Surfers Paradise	18	12	6	0	1423	1171	121.5	48	Finals series
5	Wilston Grange	18	11	7	0	1485	1383	107.4	44	Finals series
6	Palm Beach Currumbin	18	8	9	1	1385	1583	87.5	34	Finals series
7	Labrador	18	7	10	1	1288	1470	87.6	30	
8	Maroochydore	18	7	11	0	1454	1422	102.3	28	
9	Morningside	18	7	11	0	1343	1602	83.8	28	
10	Noosa	18	6	12	0	1357	1711	79.3	24	
11	Mount Gravatt	18	5	13	0	1399	1780	78.6	20	
12	Sherwood Districts	18	1	17	0	971	1912	50.8	4	

Rules for classification: 1) points; 2) percentage; 3) number of points for.
(P) Premiers

== Finals series ==
=== Grand Final ===
2023 QAFL Grand Final
Saturday, 16 September (2:05 pm)	Aspley	def.	Redland-Victoria Point	Giffin Park
4.4 (28); 8.7 (55); 12.8 (80); 16.12 (108)	Q1; Q2; Q3; Final	1.2 (8); 2.7 (19); 5.8 (38); 9.12 (66)
Freeman 5, Stackelberg 3, O'Dwyer 2, Toye 2, Best, Payne, Peppin, Watson	Goals	Hammelmann 5, Hausfeld, Matthews, O'Sullivan, Rolls
Dawson, Freeman, Payne, Harker, Craven, Wolbers	Best	O'Sullivan, Huddy, Hambleton, Hammelmann, William, Rolls

== See also ==
- 2023 QAFLW season
