= Danny Dickfos =

Australian rules footballer (born 1970)

Personal information
- Born: 30 September 1970 (age 56); Queensland
- Original team: Windsor Zillmere (AFLQ)
- Debut: Round 1, 1996, Brisbane Bears vs. Footscray FC, at The Gabba
- Height: 194 cm (6 ft 4 in)
- Weight: 97 kg (214 lb)

Playing career^{1}
Years	Club	Games (Goals)
1996	Brisbane Bears	22 (0)
1997–1999	Brisbane Lions	43 (0)
Total		65 (0)
- ^{1} Playing statistics correct to the end of 1999.

Career highlights
- Best first year player (Brisbane Bears) 1996; Grogan Medal 2000; State of Origin (Queensland)

Danny Dickfos (born 30 September 1970) is a former professional Australian rules footballer who played for the Brisbane Bears and Brisbane Lions in the Australian Football League.

== Early life ==
Dickfos, of Māori descent, grew up in Brisbane Queensland.

An outstanding talent in the Queensland Australian Football League (QAFL), Dickfos played for Queensland in the 1987 Teal Cup, then played over 100 games semi-professionally for Windsor Zillmere. During this time he was made several offers by AFL clubs, which he consistently rejected.

AFL fans first learnt of Dickfos when he made appearances in State of Origin matches, impressing for Queensland.

== AFL career ==
After the Brisbane' Bears moderately successful few years at the Gabba, Dickfos was lured to the club as a rookie at age 26 in 1996.

After winning the best first year player award (sharing it with Clark Keating), Dickfos played 65 games for the Brisbane Bears and Lions.

At 194 cm tall and weighing 97 kg, he became a dependable presence in the league's defence. His physical style of play and uncompromising approach to defending made him popular among the club's supporters.

In 1996, he was part of the Brisbane Bears' final side and in 1997 was a member of the inaugural Brisbane Lions team following the Bears merger with Fitzroy.

In 1997, he was given the Lions one percenter of the year award and finished fifth in the Merrett–Murray Medal, behind Matthew Clarke, Nigel Lappin, Marcus Ashcroft and Justin Leppitsch. In the same year he played a key part of the club's first finals side.

The following year, he finished eighth in the club best and fairest count, equal with Brad Scott and Daryl White.

In 1999, after just a few seasons in the AFL and at the age of 29, Dickfos decided to return to the QAFL and the Eagles, to the disappointment of many Brisbane Lions fans.

== Post AFL ==
He went on to win the 2000 Grogan Medal and continued to be an impressive player, playing over 250 games for the Eagles club, becoming the new record holder.
