= Dick Parton =

Australian rules footballer, born 1917

Personal information
- Full name: Richard Parton
- Born: 12 September 1917; Brisbane, Queensland
- Died: 20 April 2006 (aged 88); Queensland

Career highlights
- Grogan Medallist 1949

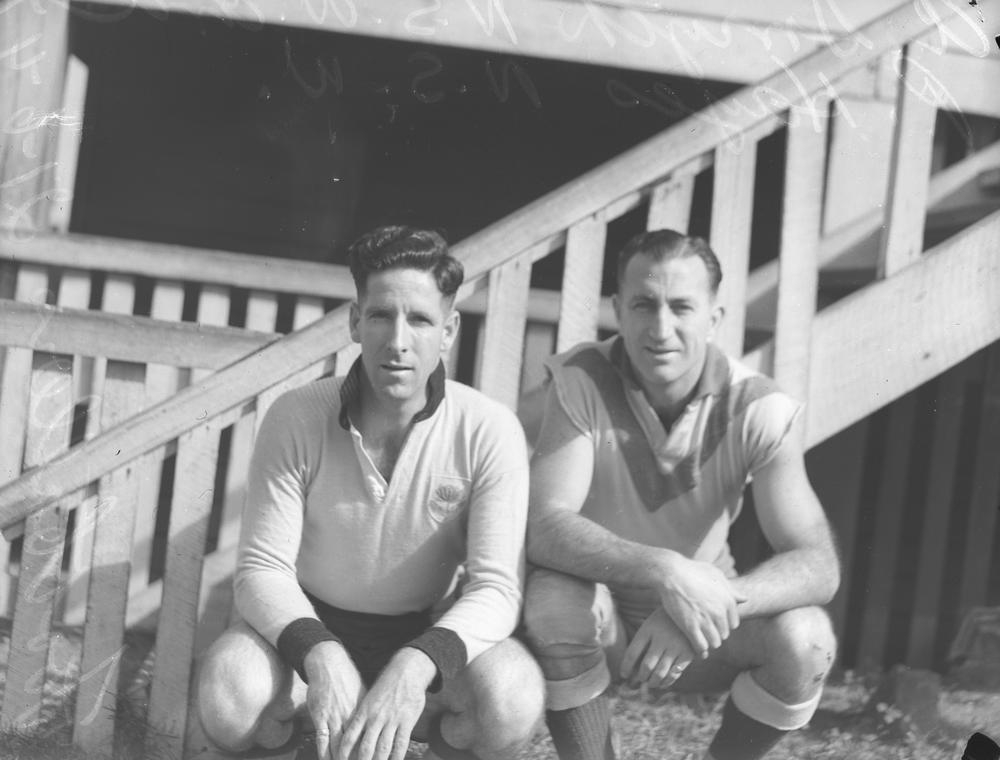
Parton with L. Jackson

Richard Parton (12 September 1917 – 20 April 2006) was an Australian rules footballer who achieved notable success in his home state of Queensland.

Playing for Windsor in the Queensland Australian National Football League, he was awarded the Grogan Medal in 1949 during the latter stages of his career. He represented his state in his sport numerous times over his career, including a match in 1939 against New South Wales in which he kicked nine goals. He served as captain of the Queensland team between 1946 and 1947.

In 2003, he was named at centre half-forward in the Queensland Team of the Century.
