= Megan Hunt (footballer) =

Australian rules footballer (born 1995)

Personal information
- Full name: Megan Hunt
- Born: 21 December 1995 (age 30)
- Original team: University of Queensland (QWAFL)
- Draft: No. 63, 2016 AFL Women's draft
- Debut: Round 1, 2017, Brisbane vs. Melbourne, at Casey Fields
- Height: 162 cm (5 ft 4 in)
- Position: Midfield

Playing career^{1}
Years	Club	Games (Goals)
2017–2019	Brisbane	14 (1)
- ^{1} Playing statistics correct to the end of the 2019 season.

Megan Hunt (born 21 December 1995) is an Australian rules footballer who played for the Brisbane Lions in the AFL Women's.

== Early life ==
Hunt was born in 1995. She was playing for University of Queensland when she was drafted.

== AFLW career ==
Hunt was recruited by Brisbane with the number 63 pick in the 2016 AFL Women's draft. She made her debut in the Lions' inaugural game against Melbourne at Casey Fields on 5 February 2017.

Brisbane signed Hunt for the 2018 season during the trade period in May 2017.

In April 2019, Hunt was delisted by Brisbane.

== Statistics ==
Legend
G	Goals	K	Kicks	D	Disposals	T	Tackles
B	Behinds	H	Handballs	M	Marks

Season	Team	No.	Games	Totals							Averages (per game)							Votes
Season	Team	No.	Games	G	B	K	H	D	M	T	G	B	K	H	D	M	T	Votes
2017	Brisbane	6	8	0	0	61	28	89	23	32	0.0	0.0	7.6	3.5	11.1	2.9	4.0	0
2018	Brisbane	6	4	0	0	14	11	25	5	12	0.0	0.0	3.5	2.8	6.3	1.3	3.0	0
2019	Brisbane	6	2	1	0	5	4	9	1	4	0.5	0.0	2.5	2.0	4.5	0.5	2.0	0
Career			14	1	0	80	43	123	29	48	0.1	0.0	5.7	3.1	8.8	2.1	3.4	0
