= Graham Road Oval =

Australian rules football venue in Brisbane, Queensland

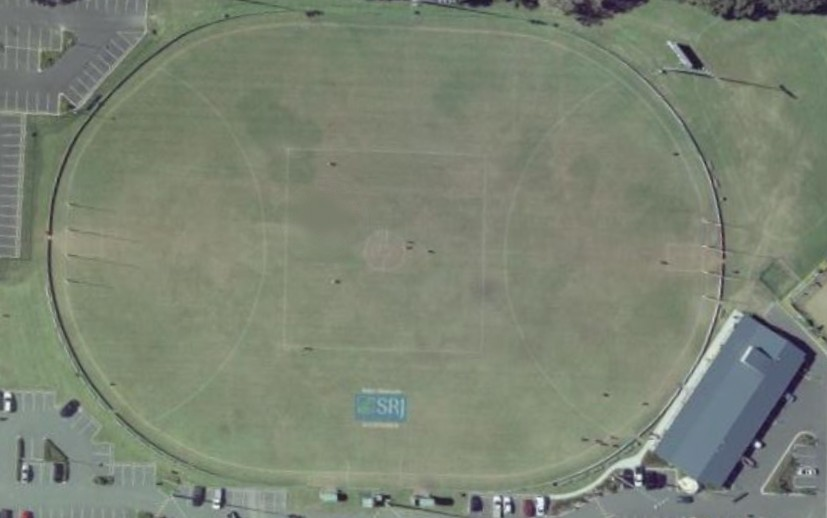
- Interactive map of Graham Road Oval
- Address: 50 Graham Rd; Carseldine, Queensland
- Coordinates: 27.356782°S 153.012707°E
- Capacity: 3,000
- Field size: 161 m × 111 m (528 ft × 364 ft)

Tenant
- Aspley Football Club

Graham Road Oval is an Australian rules football venue located in the Brisbane suburb of Carseldine. It is the home ground of the Aspley Football Club in the Queensland Australian Football League (QAFL).

== History ==
The Aspley Football Club was formed in 1964 as a junior club, before transitioning to incorporate seniors-level football four years later. It is unknown when Graham Road Oval was constructed, but Aspley was playing at the ground when it entered the Queensland Australian Football League (QAFL) in 2009.

Aspley joined the North East Australian Football League (NEAFL) for the league's inaugural season in 2011. The first NEAFL match at Graham Road Oval was held on 9 April 2011, with Broadbeach defeating Aspley by 14 points.

Graham Road Oval hosted the NEAFL grand finals in 2013 and 2014.

When the NEAFL was disbanded in 2020, Aspley joined the Victorian Football League (VFL) for one season in 2021. Six VFL matches were played at the ground during the season, before Aspley returned to the QAFL in 2022.

Since January 2025, the ground has been known under naming rights as Automall Aspley Oval.
