= Marcus Allan =

Australian rules footballer

Personal information
- Full name: Marcus Allan
- Born: 23 May 1986 (age 40)
- Original team: Northern Eagles (Queensland)/Xavier College
- Height: 181 cm (5 ft 11 in)
- Weight: 78 kg (172 lb)
- Position: Midfielder

Playing career^{1}
Years	Club	Games (Goals)
2004–2007	Brisbane	5 (1)
2008	Claremont	9 (2)
- ^{1} Playing statistics correct to the end of Round 23, 2008.

Marcus Allan (born 23 May 1986) is an Australian rules footballer in the Australian Football League. He played for WAFL club Claremont in 2008. He is currently playing for the Old Xaverians in the VAFA.

He is the sοn of Collingwood and Fitzroy player Graeme "Gubby" Allan, who is now the General Manager of Football Operations at Team GWS.

Marcus attended St. Joseph's College, Gregory Terrace in Brisbane.

== Career ==
=== Brisbane Lions ===
He was recruited by Brisbane thrοugh the 2005 AFL Rοοkie Draft, frοm the Northern Eagles AFC in Zillmere, Queensland. He was elevated tο the Brisbane Lions seniοr list in 2006, when he made his debut in Rοund 19.

Marcus played 5 games for Brisbane before he was delisted by Brisbane Football Club on 22 September 2007.

=== Claremont Tigers ===
Marcus still had ambitions to play senior AFL football and signed with WAFL club Claremont. He played his first game against West Perth and showed flashes of the brilliance that earned him a spot on the Brisbane list.

== Aspley Hornets ==
On 10 February, Marcus Allan joined his original club, Aspley Hornets for their debut season in the AFLQ. Allan, who played five games with the Brisbane Lions across 2006-07 before moving to the WAFL last season, is waiting on a clearance from Claremont.

== Trivia ==
Marcus wears number 42, however now wears the number 3 for Claremont.

== Statistics ==
Statistics are correct as of Round 23, 2008 (1 October 2008)

Season	Team	No.	Games	Goals	Behinds	Kicks	Marks	Handballs	Disp. Av
2006	Brisbane	42	1	0	0	8	6	2	10.0
2007	Brisbane	42	4	1	0	30	16	19	12.2
2008	Claremont	3	9	2	3	72	15	32	11.6
AFL Totals			5	1	0	38	22	21	11.8
WAFL Totals			9	2	3	72	15	32	11.6
