= Zillmere Eagles Australian Football Club =

Zillmere Eagles

Names
- Full name: Zillmere Eagles Football Club
- Nickname: Eagles

Club details
- Founded: 1923; 103 years ago
- Colours
- Competition: QFA Div 2
- President: Matthew Smith
- Coach: Michael Hyndman
- Captain: Cameron Pickering
- Premierships: QAFL (18): 1929, 1930, 1932, 1933, 1936, 1937, 1938, 1939, 1940, 1947, 1949, 1950, 1951, 1975, 1976, 1981, 1988, 1995; QFA (3): 2013, 2016, 2017
- Ground: O'Callaghan Park (capacity: 15,000)

Uniforms
Home

Other information
- Official website: zillmereeagles.com.au

Zillmere Eagles Australian Football Club (formerly Windsor-Zillmere, North Brisbane and Northern Eagles) is an Australian rules football club based in the suburb of Zillmere in the northern suburbs of Brisbane. The team plays in the QFA Division 2.

Zillmere reformed the senior side in 2013 and was undefeated all year in the SEQAFL State Div 4 northern competition, and once competed in the AFL Queensland Australian Football League, where it ceased to play in 2008.

The club also fields women's (in the AFL Queensland Women's League) and junior teams.

== History ==
The original Windsor FC had been established in 1923. The team won thirteen QAFL premierships until 1962, when the "Windsor-Zillmere FC" was formed from the merger of Windsor and neighbouring Zillmere Football Club. The club would win four QAFL premierships (and being runner-up three times) between 1975 and 1988.

Another merger was in 1991, when Zillmere joined Sandgate to form "North Brisbane FC". Under that name, the club won the 1995 QAFL premiership, but financial difficulties forced it into recess in 1996. A re-financed "Northern Eagles" were formed in 1997, then renamed "Zillmere Eagles" in 2005.

In October 2008, the AFLQ transferred the licence from Zillmere Eagles to neighbouring club Aspley as part of an independent review which looked into the best long term option for Australian football in North Brisbane.

== Notable former players ==
A number of other players have been drafted from the Zillmere Eagles after playing a handful of games but they have been produced by junior clubs surrounding Zillmere. The club has produced several notable players for the Australian Football League including:

=== Men's ===
- Frank Dunell
- Mitch Hahn
- Robert Copeland
- Josh Drummond
- Danny Dickfos
- Brendan Whitecross
- Daniel Pratt
- Marcus Allan
- Brett Backwell
- Zac Smith
- Ben Warren
- Craig Brittain
- Daniel Dzufer
- Reuben William
- Rylan Green
- Zac Morgan
- Kurt Walter
- Cheynee Stiller

=== Women's ===
- Ally Anderson
- Tayla Harris
- Sharni Webb
- Sophie Conway
- Jacqui Yorston
- Shaleise Law

== Honours ==
=== Premierships ===
- QAFL (18): 1929, 1930, 1932, 1933, 1936, 1937, 1938, 1939, 1940, 1947, 1949, 1950, 1951, (Note: Original Zillmere FC) 1975, 1976, 1981, (Note: As "Windsor-Zillmere FC") 1988, 1995 (Note: As "North Brisbane FC")
- QFA (3): 2013, 2016, 2017

=== Grogan Medallists ===
The Grogan Medal is awarded to the best and fairest player in an AFLQ season. The club have had 7 players win the award.

- Dick Parton – 1949
- Robin Hull – 1967
- Terry Weller – 1969
- Barry Karklis – 1980
- Craig Brittain – 1988
- Cameron Buchanan – 1991
- Danny Dickfos – 2000
- Matty Payne – 2006

Coach of the Year

- Murray Davis - 2006
