= Ben Warren (Australian rules footballer) =

Australian rules footballer (born 1989)

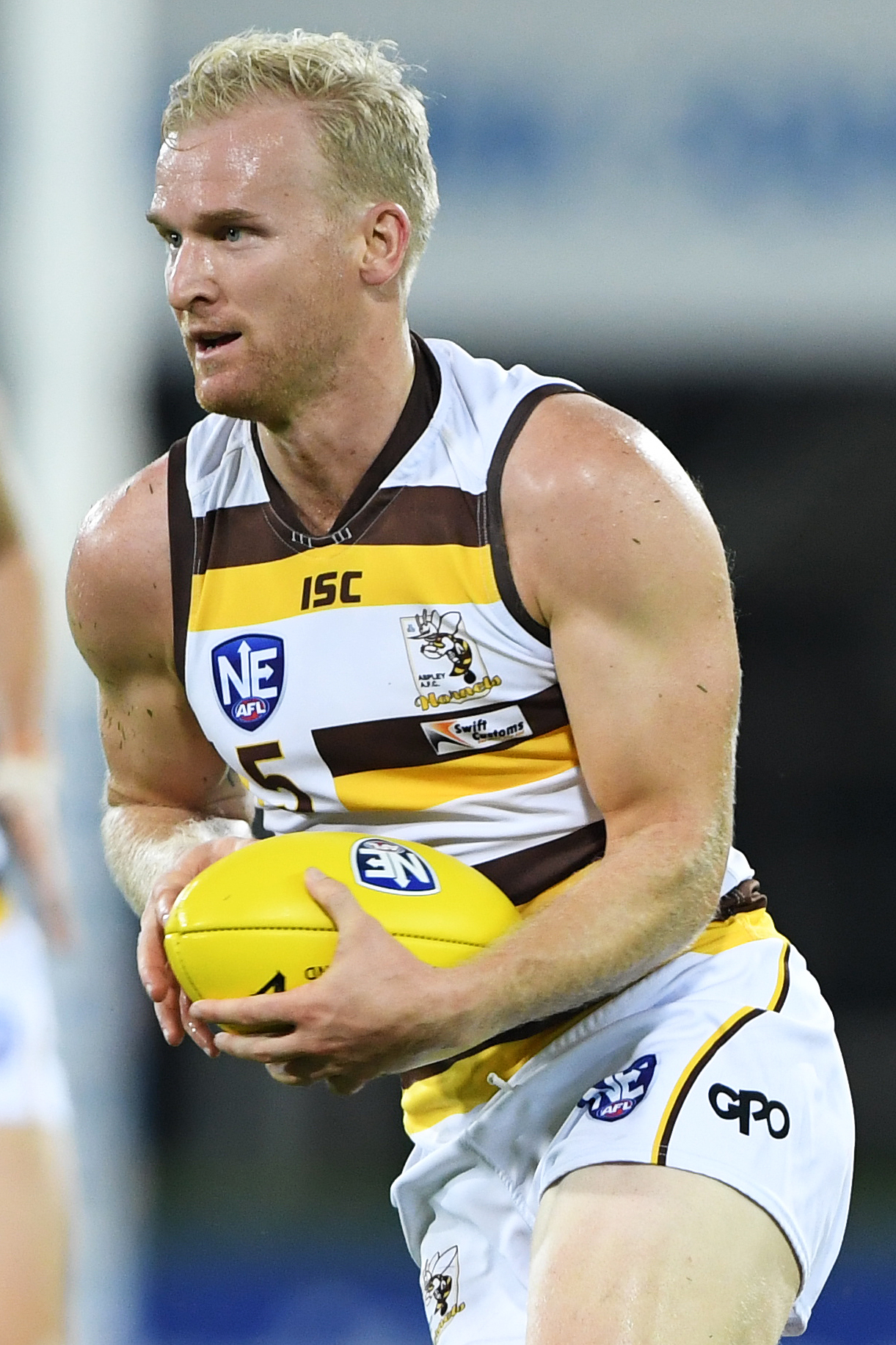
- Warren in July 2018

Personal information
- Full name: Ben Warren
- Born: 11 February 1989 (age 37); Queensland
- Original team: Zillmere Eagles (QAFL)
- Draft: No. 69, 2006 National Draft, Kangaroos
- Height: 186 cm (6 ft 1 in)
- Weight: 89 kg (196 lb)
- Position: forward

Club information
- Current club: Werribee Tigers (VFL)

Playing career^{1}
| Years | Club | Games (Goals) |
| 2009–2012 | North Melbourne | 29 (34) |
| | Werribee Tigers (VFL) | 50 (118) |
- ^{1} Playing statistics correct to the end of Round 10 2012.

Ben Warren (born 11 February 1989) is an Australian rules footballer who played for the North Melbourne Football Club in the Australian Football League (AFL).

Recruited from the Zillmere Eagles in Queensland at pick 69 in the 2006 AFL draft by North Melbourne. Warren spent two years in development, playing in the VFL, for Tasmania in 2007 and Werribee in 2008, before making his senior AFL debut for North Melbourne in Round 4, 2009. Warren impressed coaching staff of the club with his performances, especially his four-goal haul against Brisbane at Etihad Stadium in Round 10. Warren played five consecutive games after his debut, but broke his leg in Round 13 and missed the rest of the season. Despite his broken leg, Warren was re-signed by North Melbourne in August 2009, with list manager, Cameron Joyce, stating that "It was a priority for us to lock Ben in", due to interest being shown in the Queensland native from the new Gold Coast team.

The 2010 season became Warren's best, having his best pre-season, and playing 16 matches, kicking 21 goals. He only played three games in 2011, and only a single game from the first ten in 2012, despite being the leading goalkicker for North Melbourne's reserves team, the Werribee Football Club in the Victorian Football League.

Warren was delisted by North Melbourne at the end of the 2012 season. He continued playing with Werribee after being delisted, and he was the leading goalkicker in the completed 2013 VFL season including finals with 59 goals (he finished third in the league's goalkicking award, the Frosty Miller Medal which is based on home-and-away goals only).
