= Aspley Football Club =

Australian rules football club based in the northern-Brisbane suburb of Aspley

Names
- Full name: Aspley Australian Football Club
- Nickname: Hornets

2026 QAFL season
- Home-and-away season: 10th

Club details
- Founded: 1964; 62 years ago
- Colours
- Competition: QAFL: Senior men QAFLW: Senior women QFA: Reserves men Masters: Over 35 & Over 45
- President: Peter Eyles
- Coach: QAFL: Marc Seen; QAFLW: Luke Glacken; QFA: Craig Wells
- Captain(s): QAFL: Jordon Arnold; QAFLW: Anna Van de Wiel; QFA: Reegan Harty
- Premierships: QAFL (2): 2022; 2023; QFA Div 1 (9): 1985; 1986; 1987; 1988; 1989; 1990; 1992; 2002; QFA Div 2 (9): 2017; NEAFL (1): 2014
- Ground: Graham Road Oval (3,000)

Uniforms
Home

Other information
- Official website: www.aspleyhornets.com.au

The Aspley Football Club, nicknamed the Hornets, is an Australian rules football club based in the northern-Brisbane suburb of Aspley. The club competes in multiple Queensland-based competitions, including in the Queensland Australian Football League, Division 1 of the Queensland Football Association, the Queensland AFL Women's League, and several underage competitions for boys and girls. The senior men's team has in the past competed in second-tier state league competitions, notably the North East Australian Football League from 2011 to 2020 and the Victorian Football League in 2021.

== History ==
The roots of Aspley Hornets Football Club can be traced back to 1964, when it was founded as a junior club, before transitioning to incorporate seniors-level football four years later. The club's senior men's team competed in Division 1 of the QFA competition for several years and won six consecutive premierships between 1985 and 1990. The QFA is the leading metropolitan football competition in Brisbane and the south-east, sitting one rung below the Queensland Australian Football League. The club dropped to Division 2 of the QFA by the mid-2000s, its best result was reaching a preliminary final in 2006. Despite a poor 2008 campaign, Aspley were promoted to Division 1 for the 2009 season following the demise of fellow northern Brisbane team the Zillmere Eagles, on the basis of their strong financial position and impressive playing numbers. In recognition of this change, Aspley played four matches in the 2009 season at Zillmere's former homeground O’Callaghan Park.

In 2011 Aspley's senior men's team was granted a license to compete in the North East Australian Football League (NEAFL), the premier competition for independent clubs and reserves teams of AFL clubs based in Queensland and New South Wales. Aspley were a very competitive team in the NEAFL, qualifying for finals most seasons and claiming the 2014 premiership against the Sydney Swans reserves at their home ground, the Hornets' signature achievement. In 2020 the NEAFL was dissolved and Aspley accepted an invitation from the AFL Commission to participate in the Victorian Football League (VFL) from 2021, along with one other independent Queensland-based NEAFL team (Southport); it won its first game, but lost its next nine to win the wooden spoon, and declined to renew its licence beyond the 2021 season. In its sole VFL season, the club celebrated the individual success of Matthew Hammelmann who won the Jim 'Frosty' Miller Medal after kicking 42 goals to lead the competition goalkicking.

As of 2021 Aspley's reserve men's team competes in Division 1 of the QFA and the women's team competes in the Queensland AFL Women's League. With the biggest number of juniors in Queensland, Aspley has established itself as a power base for the game in the south-east Queensland region.

== Facilities ==
Aspley has a license and gaming club at its Graham Road premises, own other grounds at Brendale, and recently opened a new $1.5 million training and changeroom complex.

== Honours ==
- NEAFL (1): 2014
- QFA Division 1 (9): 1985, 1986, 1987, 1988, 1989, 1990, 1992, 2002
- QFA Division 2 (1): 2017

NEAFL League MVP's: 3 (Matthew Payne – 2014, 2016, 2018)

== AFL/AFLW players ==
=== AFL ===
Players from Aspley who have also played in the AFL are:

- Aliir Mayom Aliir – Sydney and Port Adelaide
- Marcus Allan – Brisbane Lions
- Jackson Allen – Gold Coast
- Harris Andrews – Brisbane Lions
- Oskar Baker – Melbourne
- Jordon Bourke – Brisbane Lions
- Mabior Chol – Richmond Gold Coast and Hawthorn
- Robert Copeland – Brisbane Lions
- Liam Dawson – Brisbane Lions
- Joseph Daye – Gold Coast
- Daniel Dzufer – Brisbane Lions
- Jonathan Freeman – Brisbane Lions
- Eric Hipwood – Brisbane Lions
- Joel Macdonald – Brisbane Lions and Melbourne
- Eddie Sansbury – North Melbourne
- Matthew Shir – Adelaide
- Cheynee Stiller – Brisbane Lions
- Corey Wagner – North Melbourne, Melbourne and Fremantle
- Josh Wagner – Melbourne
- Ben Warren – North Melbourne
- Luke Weller – Brisbane Lions and Richmond

=== AFLW ===
Players from Aspley who have also been part of AFLW squads are:

- Sophie Conway - Brisbane Lions

== Club song ==
The club song is sung to the tune of "Toreador" from Carmen, a melody that is also used by the Geelong Cats, a team of Victoria in Australian Football League.

(First Verse)

We are the Hornets, we're the greatest team

We're from Aspley, that's easily seen

See the brown and gold colours flying high,

We will reach for the sky!

We'll win the premiership, and that's no brag,

We'll win the premiership flag!

(Second Verse)

Now see the Hornets, watch them how they play

They'll show their sting, when they win today

See the brown and bold colours flying high

We will reach for the sky

We’ll win the Premiership

And that’s no brag

We’ll win the Premiership Flag
