= Jake Rogers (footballer) =

Australian rules footballer (born 2005)

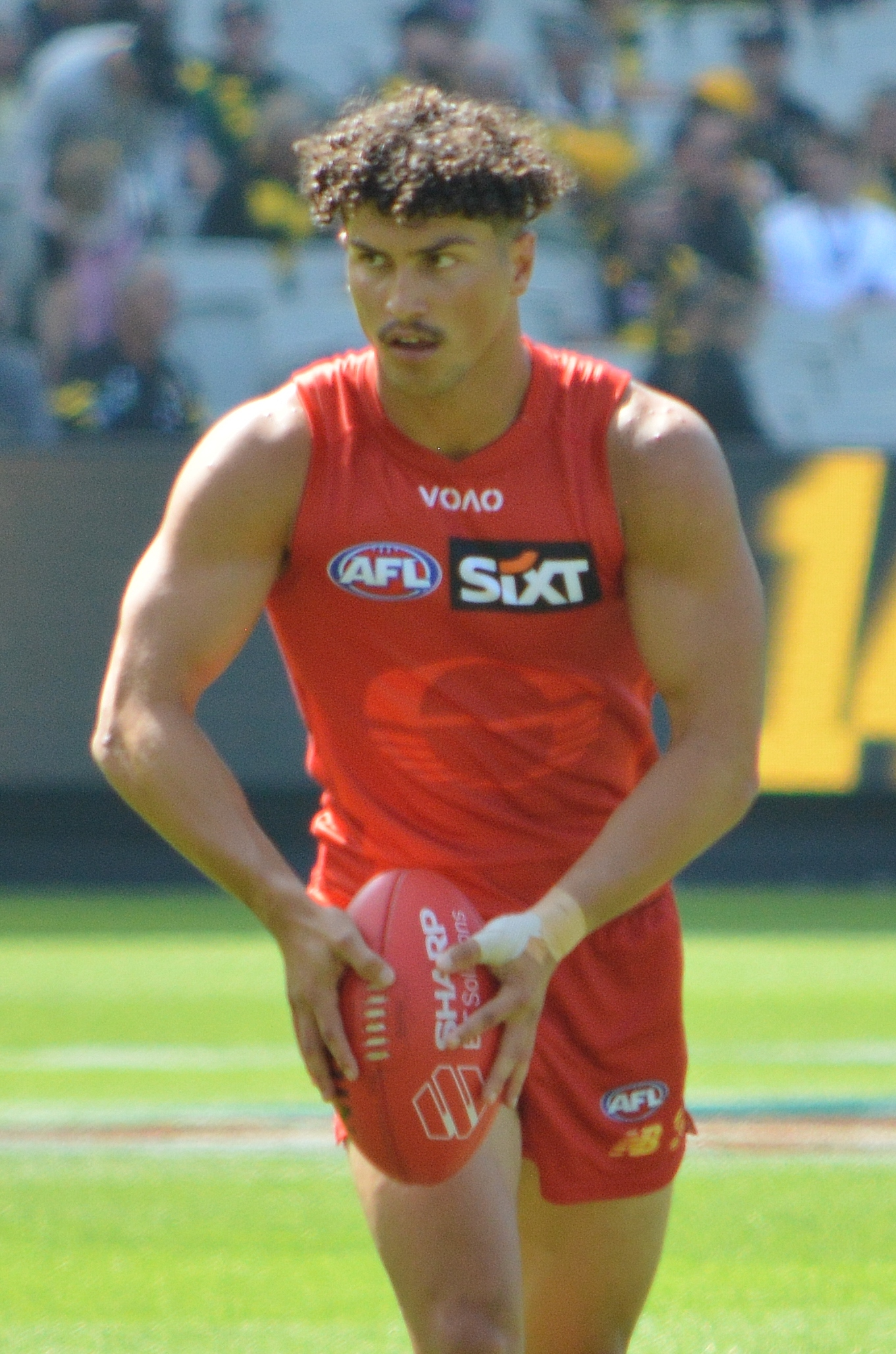
- Rogers in March 2026

Personal information
- Full name: Jake Rogers
- Nickname: Snake
- Born: 2 March 2005 (age 21)
- Original team: Broadbeach (QAFL) / Gold Coast Suns Academy (Talent League)
- Draft: No. 14, 2023 AFL draft
- Height: 172 cm (5 ft 8 in)
- Position: Forward

Club information
- Current club: Gold Coast
- Number: 29

Playing career^{1}
Years	Club	Games (Goals)
2024–	Gold Coast	25 (10)
- ^{1} Playing statistics correct to the end of round 22, 2026.

Jake Rogers is a professional Australian rules footballer who was selected by the Gold Coast Suns with the fourteenth pick in the 2023 AFL draft.

== Early life ==
Rogers was born in Melbourne to an Australian father and a South African mother. He moved with his family to the Gold Coast at five years of age and attended Varsity College throughout his upbringing. He grew up supporting Collingwood. Rogers began playing junior football for the first time shortly after arriving in Queensland when he signed up to play for the Broadbeach Cats in the local Gold Coast under-6s competition. Rogers became a foundation member of the Gold Coast Suns when they entered the Australian Football League in 2011 and he joined the club's Academy at 13 years of age where he met future AFL teammates Jed Walter, Ethan Read and Will Graham.

Along with Australian rules football, Rogers also played rugby league for his school in the position of fullback. He made his senior QAFL debut for Broadbeach at 16 years of age in May 2021. In 2022, his club form was rewarded with selection to represent the Allies in the U18 National Championships as well as the Gold Coast Suns Academy in the U19 Talent League. His performances at the representative and club levels led to placement in the AFL's 30-player National Academy program on the eve of his draft year.

In 2023, he moved into top 20 draft calculations when he was awarded the best on ground award in the AFL U18 Academy's victory over Carlton's VFL team and also played in the Allies' first U18 National Championship win, which earned him a starting midfield position in the 2023 U18 All-Australian team. Rogers was drafted to his hometown team the Gold Coast Suns with pick 14 in the 2023 AFL draft after the Suns elected to match a bid from the Sydney Swans.

== AFL career ==
Rogers made his AFL debut for the Suns in round 6 of the 2024 season against the Sydney Swans at the Sydney Cricket Ground.

== Statistics ==
Updated to the end of round 22, 2026.

Legend
G	Goals	K	Kicks	D	Disposals	T	Tackles
B	Behinds	H	Handballs	M	Marks

Season	Team	No.	Games	Totals							Averages (per game)							Votes
Season	Team	No.	Games	G	B	K	H	D	M	T	G	B	K	H	D	M	T	Votes
2024	Gold Coast	29	9	2	0	33	50	83	10	24	0.2	0.0	3.7	5.6	9.2	1.1	2.7	0
2025	Gold Coast	29	9	4	2	36	29	65	10	9	0.4	0.2	4.0	3.2	7.2	1.1	1.0	0
2026	Gold Coast	29	7	4	1	26	36	62	10	16	0.6	0.1	3.7	5.1	8.9	1.4	2.3	0
Career			25	10	3	95	115	210	30	49	0.4	0.1	3.8	4.6	8.4	1.2	2.0	0
