= Max Spencer =

Australian rules footballer (born 1997)

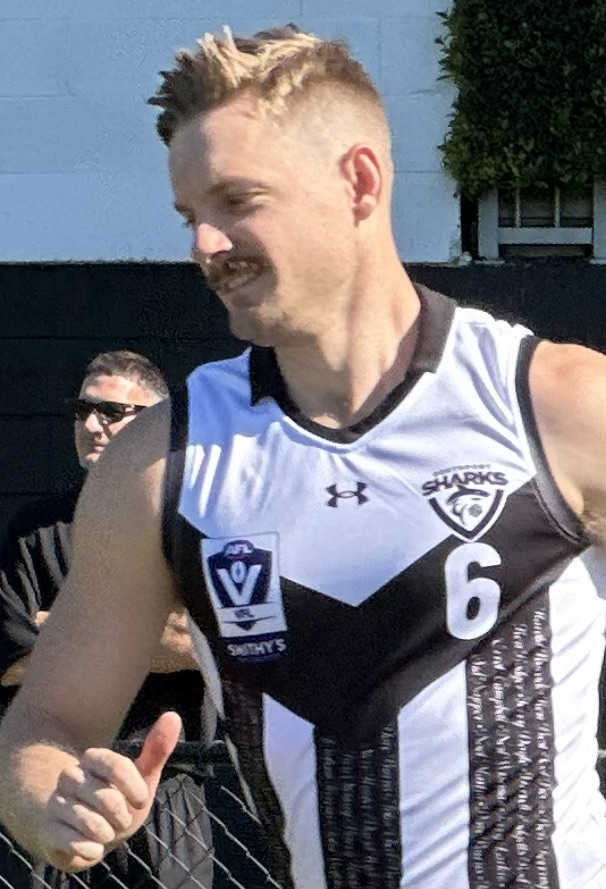
- Spencer in June 2026

Personal information
- Full name: Max Leslie Spencer
- Born: 4 October 1997 (age 29); Gold Coast, Queensland
- Original team: Palm Beach Currumbin (QAFL)
- Height: 190 cm (6 ft 3 in)
- Weight: 90 kg (198 lb)
- Position: Defender

Playing career^{1}
Years	Club	Games (Goals)
2017-2018	Gold Coast	8 (0)
- ^{1} Playing statistics correct to the end of 2018.

Max Leslie Spencer (born 4 October 1997) is a former professional Australian rules footballer who currently plays for the Southport Football Club in the Victorian Football League (VFL). He previously played for the Gold Coast Suns in the Australian Football League (AFL).

== Early life ==
Spencer grew up playing his junior football on the Gold Coast for the Palm Beach Currumbin Australian Football Club alongside future AFL teammate Jesse Joyce and attended Palm Beach Currumbin High School in his teenage years.

== Career ==
=== AFL ===
Spencer was a member of the Gold Coast Suns Academy from a young age and was drafted by Gold Coast as a Queensland zone selection as a pre-rookie draft selection in 2016. He made his AFL debut against Richmond at Metricon Stadium in round 19 of the 2017 season. He delisted at the end of the 2018 season.

=== VFL ===
Spencer played for Southport in the club's six-point 2024 VFL grand final loss to Werribee.
