= Jacob Heron =

Australian rules footballer

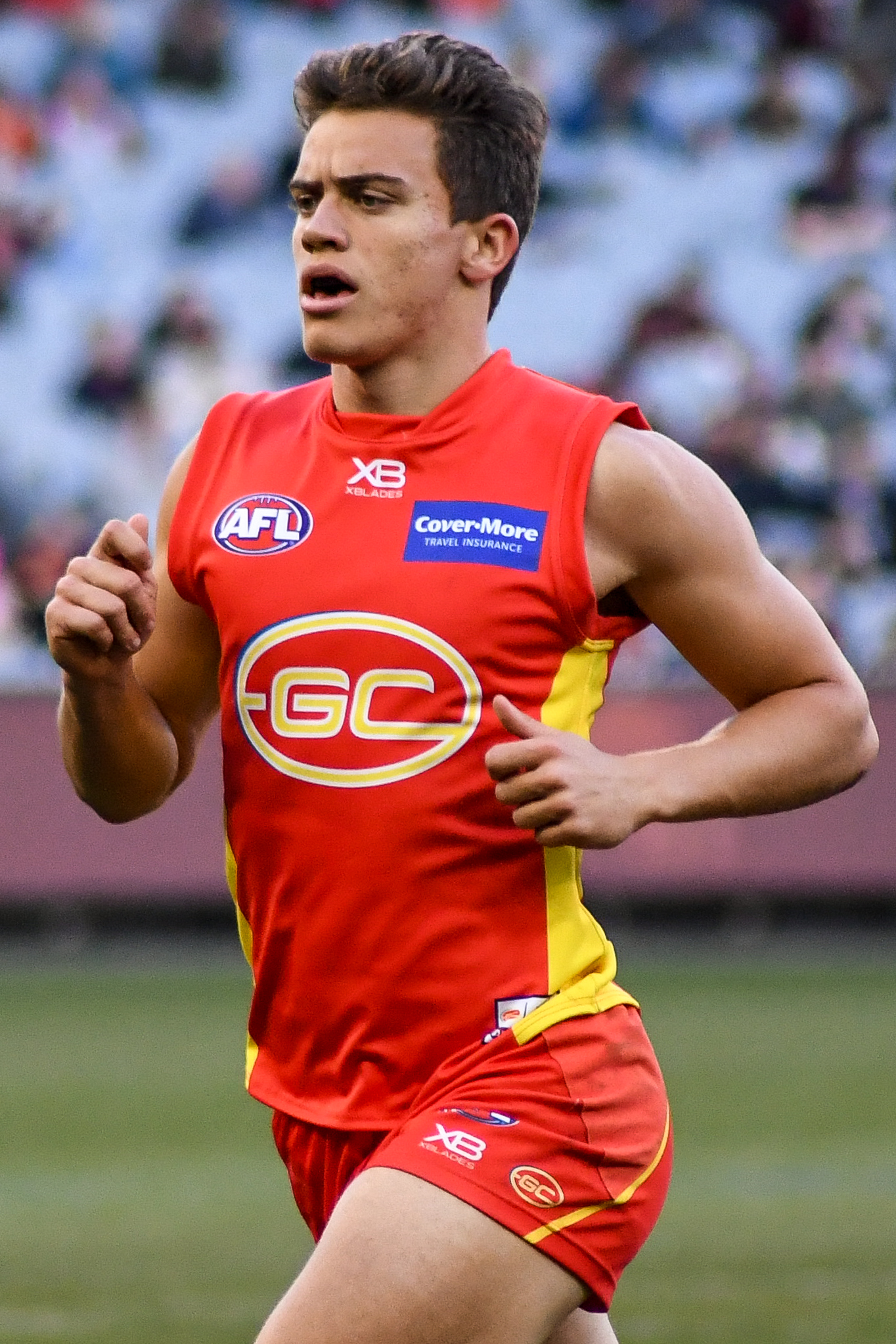
- Heron playing for Gold Coast in August 2018

Personal information
- Full name: Jacob Heron
- Nicknames: Speedy, Pugface
- Born: 10 December 1999 (age 26)
- Original teams: Palm Beach Currumbin (QAFL); Cairns (AFL Cairns)
- Height: 184 cm (6 ft 0 in)
- Weight: 78 kg (172 lb)
- Position: Small forward

Playing career^{1}
Years	Club	Games (Goals)
2018-2020	Gold Coast	13 (2)
- ^{1} Playing statistics correct to the end of 2019.

Jacob Heron (born 10 December 1999) is an Australian rules footballer who currently plays for the Southport Football Club in the Victorian Football League (VFL). He previously for the Gold Coast Suns in the Australian Football League (AFL).

== Early life ==
Heron was raised in Cairns, Queensland and attended St Augustine's College. He grew up playing his junior football for the Cairns Saints in the AFL Cairns competition. Towards the end of his junior football, he relocated to the Gold Coast as part of the Gold Coast Suns Academy and began playing for Palm Beach Currumbin as well as attending Palm Beach Currumbin High School.

== Career ==
=== AFL ===
Heron was named to make his AFL debut in round 9 of the 2018 AFL season against Port Adelaide in Shanghai, China. He became the first player to make his AFL debut in a game played outside of Australia.

=== VFL ===
Heron played for Southport in the club's six-point 2024 VFL grand final loss to Werribee.
