= Palm Beach Currumbin State High School =

Coordinates: 28.1319°S 153.4753°E

Location
- Thrower Drive; Currumbin, Queensland

Information
- School type: Public
- Motto: Nil Sed Optima
- Established: 1972
- Executive Principal: Chris Capra
- Grades: 7–12
- Enrolment: 2,649 (2023)
- Language: English
- Colours: Red, white and blue
- Website: Official website

Palm Beach Currumbin State High School is an independent public, co-educational, secondary school, located in the Gold Coast suburb of Palm Beach, in Queensland, Australia. It is administered by the Department of Education, with an enrolment of 2,649 students and a teaching staff of 198, as of 2023. The school serves students from Year 7 to Year 12.

== History ==
The school opened on either 24 January 1972 or 1 February 1972.

In August 1973, the construction of 'H' block was announced; it was described it would include 'six classrooms, a staff room, locker room, store, and additional toilets.' It was stated to cost $149,162 at the time.

In 1974, the Works and Housing Minister at the time, Mr. Hodges, announced the construction of a science building at the school, which was to cost $160,121 at the time.

$49,000 was allocated to the school for the installation of water tanks to irrigate the school grounds in 2006. The project was estimated to save twenty-two million litres of water each year.

== Excellence programs ==
=== Academic Excellence ===
Academic Excellence was established in 2001, specifically created for students who desire to achieve the most out of their scholastic studies. Students that participate study a modified curriculum to further streamline their progression into the senior school.

=== Creative Arts Excellence ===
The Creative Arts Excellence program focuses on developing ambition, artistry and academia in students. The program includes specialised skills training, arts showcases and projects.

=== Sports Excellence ===
In 1996, the Sports Excellence program was created to allow students in years 8-12 excelling in sport to play and train at a more professional level. The program helps students develop as athletes as well as the fair play and leadership aspects that accompany it. ‘Sport Ex’ is taken as 1 of 6 chosen subjects, which enables more time per week in the program. Sports Excellence now accommodates students in AFL, Basketball, Kayaking, Netball, Soccer, Rugby League, Tennis, Track & Field, Surfing and Touch Football.

==== AFL Team Achievements ====
===== Senior Male (Years 10–12) =====
- AFL Queensland Schools Cup

(gold) Champions: (7) 2016, 2017, 2018, 2020, 2022, 2023, 2024
(silver) Runners Up: 2019, 2021

- AFL Queensland Schools of Excellence Cup

(gold) Champions: (3) 2013, 2014, 2015

===== Senior Female (Years 10–12) =====
- AFL Queensland Schools Cup

(gold) Champions: (4) 2020, 2021, 2023, 2024
(silver) Runners Up: 2019, 2022

===== Junior Male (Years 7–9) =====
- AFL Queensland Schools Cup

(gold) Champions: (6) 2019, 2020, 2021, 2022, 2023, 2024
(silver) Runners Up: 2016, 2017

- AFL Queensland Schools of Excellence Cup

(gold) Champions: (4) 2010, 2011, 2012, 2013

===== Junior Female (Years 7–9) =====
- AFL Queensland Schools Cup

(gold) Champions: (6) 2019, 2020, 2021, 2022, 2023, 2024

== Notable alumni ==
=== Rugby League ===
- Clint Amos – former North Queensland and Gold Coast Titans player
- Scott Anderson – former Melbourne, Brisbane and Wakefield Trinity player
- Aaron Booth – player for the Melbourne Storm
- Darius Boyd – former player for the Brisbane Broncos and Australian international
- Jed Cartwright – player for the Penrith Panthers
- Sam Cook – former New Zealand Warriors player
- Cameron Cullen – former Gold Coast Titans and Manly player
- Brad Davis – former Gold Coast Titans player
- Tom Dearden – player for the Brisbane Broncos
- Kane Elgey – former Gold Coast Titans and Manly player
- Jaelen Feeney – former Newcastle Knights player
- Jamal Fogarty – player for the Gold Coast Titans
- Luke Garner – player for the Wests Tigers
- Ben Hannant – former Sydney Roosters, Brisbane, Canterbury and North Queensland player and Australian international
- Keegan Hipgrave – player for the Gold Coast Titans
- Jahrome Hughes – player for the Melbourne Storm and New Zealand international
- Justin Hunt – former South Sydney, Parramatta, St George Illawarra and Wests Tigers player
- Ben Ikin – former Gold Coast Seagulls, North Sydney and Brisbane player and Australian international
- Sam Irwin – former Gold Coast Titans and Featherstone player
- Ryan James – captain of the Gold Coast Titans
- Kevin Kingston – former Cronulla, Parramatta and Penrith player
- Tom Kingston – former Gold Coast Titans player
- Karl Lawton – player for the New Zealand Warriors
- Kayne Lawton – former Gold Coast Titans and AS Carcassonne player
- Will Matthews – player for the Gold Coast Titans
- Brent McConnell former North Queensland and Brisbane player
- Steve Michaels – former Brisbane, Gold Coast Titans and Hull F.C. player
- Kai O'Donnell – player for the Canberra Raiders
- Luke O'Dwyer – former Parramatta and Gold Coast Titans player
- Keenan Palasia – player for the Brisbane Broncos
- Dimitri Pelo – former Catalans Dragons and Canberra player and French international
- Lloyd Perrett – former Canterbury and Manly player
- Sam Perrett – former Sydney Roosters and Canterbury player and New Zealand international
- Kevin Proctor – player for the Gold Coast Titans and New Zealand international
- Jordan Rankin – player for the Castleford Tigers
- Jordan Rapana – former Gold Coast Titans and Canberra Raiders player and New Zealand international
- Ryan Simpkins – former Gold Coast Titans player
- David Tangata-Toa – former Hull KR and Celtic Crusaders player
- Cody Walker – player for the South Sydney Rabbitohs
- Shannon Walker – former Gold Coast Titans player and Australia rugby sevens international
- Anthony Watts – former Cronulla, North Queensland and Widnes player
- Craig Weston – former Gold Coast Seagulls, Eastern Suburbs, South Queensland, Huddersfield, Doncaster and Widnes player
- Shane Wright – player for the North Queensland Cowboys

=== Australian Rules ===
- Lauren Ahrens – player for the Gold Coast Suns
- Claye Beams – former Brisbane Lions player
- Dayne Beams – former Brisbane Lions / Collingwood player
- Brayden Crossley – former Gold Coast Suns player
- Jacob Dawson – former Gold Coast Suns player
- Sam Gilbert – former St Kilda player
- Caleb Graham – player for the Gold Coast Suns
- Will Graham – player for the Gold Coast Suns
- Jacob Heron – former Gold Coast Suns player
- Jesse Joyce – former Gold Coast Suns player
- Marc Lock – former Gold Coast Suns player
- Jai Murray - player for the Gold Coast Suns
- Dylan Patterson – player for the Gold Coast Suns
- Brad Scheer – former Gold Coast Suns player
- Max Spencer – former Gold Coast Suns player
- Jed Walter – player for the Gold Coast Suns
- Joel Wilkinson – former Gold Coast Suns player

=== Football ===
- Mackenzie Arnold – Australian international
- Mitch Nichols – former Australian international
- Shane Smeltz – former New Zealand international

=== Surfing ===
- Mick Fanning – former three-time ASP World Tour champion
- Joel Parkinson – one-time ASP World Tour champion

=== Other ===
- Drew Anthony – performer, director, choreographer and producer
- Cam Brown – college football punter for the Michigan Wolverines
- FISHER – DJ and Music Producer

== See also ==
- List of schools in Gold Coast, Queensland
