= Jesse Joyce (footballer) =

Australian rules footballer (born 1997)

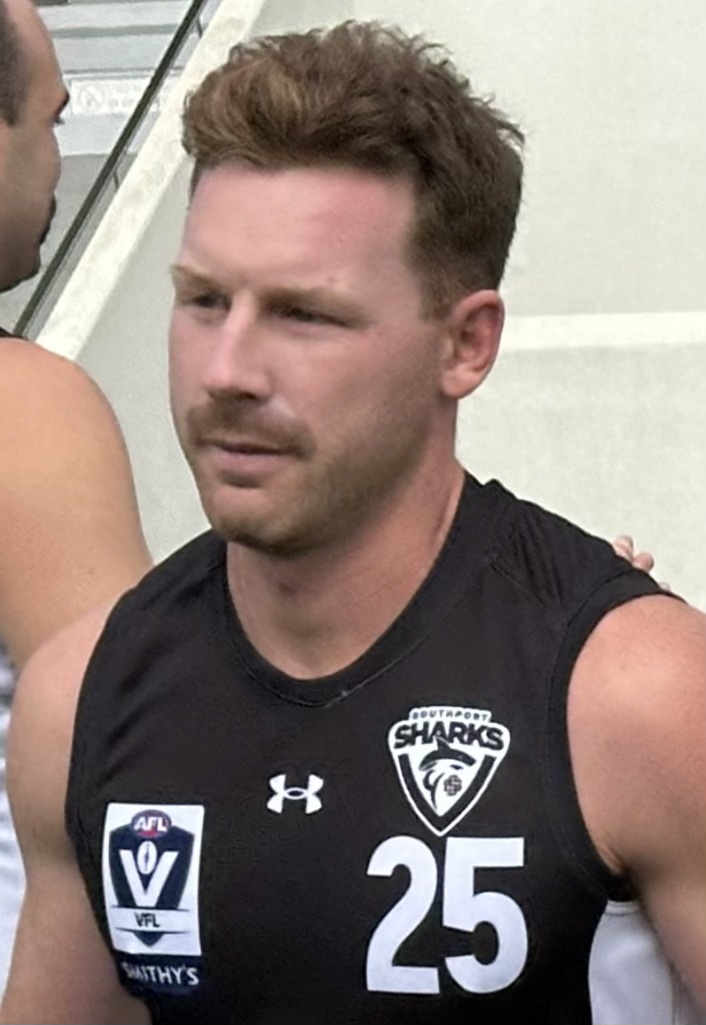
- Joyce playing for Southport in 2026

Personal information
- Full name: Jesse Joyce
- Born: 17 August 1997 (age 29)
- Original team: Palm Beach Currumbin (QAFL)
- Draft: No. 67, 2016 rookie draft
- Debut: Round 11, 2016, Gold Coast vs. Sydney, at Metricon Stadium
- Height: 183 cm (6 ft 0 in)
- Weight: 79 kg (174 lb)
- Position: Defender

Club information
- Current club: Gold Coast
- Number: 38

Playing career^{1}
Years	Club	Games (Goals)
2016–2020	Gold Coast	64 (2)
- ^{1} Playing statistics correct to the end of round 1 2020.

Jesse Joyce (born 17 August 1997) is an Australian rules footballer who currently plays for the Southport Sharks in the Victorian Football League (VFL). He previously for the Gold Coast Suns in the Australian Football League (AFL).

He was drafted by Gold Coast with their sixth selection and sixty-seventh overall in the 2016 rookie draft.

== Early life and junior football ==
Joyce was born in Melbourne but moved to Tweed Heads on the Queensland-New South Wales border at the age of 2. He first played junior football on the Gold Coast for the Coolangatta Tweed Heads Australian Football Club before switching to the Palm Beach Currumbin Australian Football Club and making his senior debut at the age of 16. He also attended Palm Beach Currumbin High School in his teenage years and graduated with future Suns teammate Max Spencer.

He joined the Gold Coast Suns Academy at the age of 14 and was drafted to his hometown team with the 67th pick in the 2016 AFL rookie draft.

== Career ==
=== AFL ===
Joyce made his AFL debut for the Gold Coast Suns against the Sydney Swans in round 11 of the 2016 AFL season. He was delisted by the Suns in 2020.

=== VFL ===
Joyce played for Southport in the club's six-point 2024 VFL grand final loss to Werribee.
