= Palm Beach Currumbin Australian Football Club =

Australian rules football club

Palm Beach Currumbin

Names
- Full name: Palm Beach Currumbin Australian Football Club Inc.
- Nickname: Lions
- Club song: PBC Theme Song

2026 QAFL season
- After finals: 1st (Premiers)
- Home-and-away season: 1st

Club details
- Founded: 1961; 65 years ago
- Colours
- Competition: QAFL
- President: Glenn Spencer
- Coach: Russell Maloney
- Captain: Steven Thynne
- Premierships: QAFL: 3 (2017, 2018, 2026)
- Ground: Salk Oval, Thrower Drive, Palm Beach QLD 4221

Uniforms
Home

Other information
- Official website: pbcafc.com.au

The Palm Beach Currumbin Australian Football Club is an Australian rules football club on the Gold Coast, Queensland based in the suburb of Palm Beach. The club emblem is the lion and the club plays in both Division One and Division Two of the AFL Queensland State League.

Palm Beach Currumbin won the 1999 premiership.

== History ==
The Central Australian Football Club was established in 1961 and was one of the founding clubs of the Gold Coast Australian Football League. By 1965 the club had captured its first GCAFL premiership and would later change its name to the Palm Beach Currumbin Australian Football Club.

== Premierships (14) ==
No.	Year	Competition	Opponent	Score	Venue
1	1965	GCAFL	Surfers Paradise Demons	10.13 (73) – 7.11 (53)	Salk Oval
2	1971	GCAFL	Southport Magpies	9.11 (65) – 7.9 (51)	Salk Oval
3	1973	GCAFL	Southport Magpies	18.15 (123) – 9.13 (67)	Salk Oval
4	1985	GCAFL	Surfers Paradise Demons	8.13 (61) – 8.8 (54)	Carrara Oval
5	1995	GCAFL	Labrador Tigers	13.12 (90) – 11.17 (83)	Len Peak Oval
6	1997	QSFLGC	Surfers Paradise Demons	10.15 (75) – 7.7 (49)	Merrimac Oval
7	1999	QSFLGC	Surfers Paradise Demons	16.9 (105) – 7.8 (50)	Merrimac Oval
8	2000	AFLQSL	Coolangatta Blues	13.8 (86) – 11.6 (72)	
9	2007	AFLQSL	Western Magpies	13.9 (87) – 6.11 (47)	Carrara Stadium
10	2009	QAFL Div 1	Noosa Tigers	14.15 (99) – 10.11 (71)	Maroochydore Multi Sports Complex
11	2013	SEQAFL Div 1	Springwood Pumas	18.19 (127) – 12.11 (83)	Giffin Park
12	2017	QAFL	Labrador Tigers	14.20 (104) – 7.9 (51)	Fankhauser Reserve
13	2018	QAFL	Broadbeach Cats	14.16 (100) – 9.12 (66)	Leyshon Park
14	2026	QAFL	Morningside	15.12 (102) – 11.13 (79)	Brighton Homes Arena

== Drafted players in the AFL ==
Year	Name	Team	Draft №
1994	John Hutton	Fremantle	WA Zone Selection
2015	Jesse Joyce	Gold Coast	67th (rookie)
2016	Brad Scheer	Gold Coast	67th
2016	Max Spencer	Gold Coast	Academy selection (rookie)
2017	Brayden Crossley	Gold Coast	52nd
2017	Jacob Dawson	Gold Coast	Academy selection (rookie)
2017	Jacob Heron	Gold Coast	Academy selection (rookie)
2018	Caleb Graham	Gold Coast	71st
2023	Jed Walter	Gold Coast	3rd
2023	Ethan Read	Gold Coast	9th
2023	Will Graham	Gold Coast	26th
2025	Dylan Patterson	Gold Coast	5th

== Notable players (seniors and juniors) ==
- Wayne Carey (Adelaide and North Melbourne)
- Levi Casboult (Carlton and Gold Coast)
- James Frawley (Melbourne, Hawthorn and St Kilda)
- Liam Jones (Carlton and Western Bulldogs)
- Michael Rischitelli (Brisbane Lions and Gold Coast)
- Jack Anthony (Collingwood and Fremantle)
- Jed Walter (Gold Coast)
- Ethan Read (Gold Coast)
- Will Graham (Gold Coast)
