= Shannon Walker (rugby) =

Australia international rugby union & league player

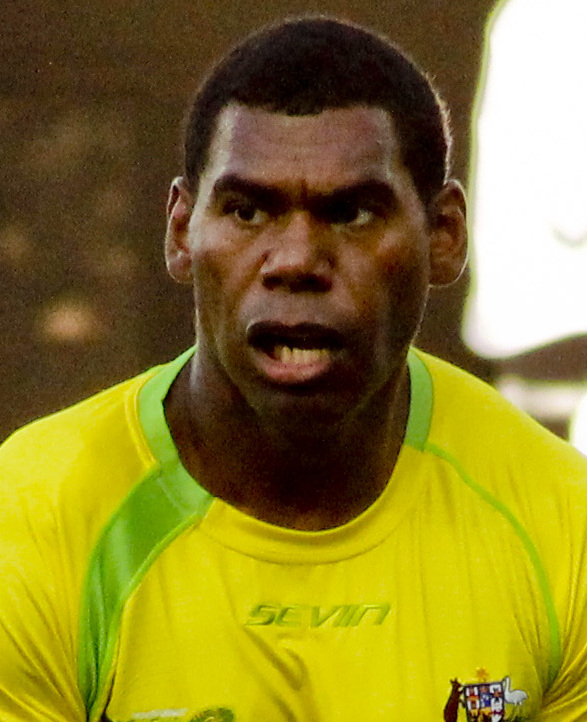

Personal information
- Born: 25 November 1988 (age 37) Kyogle, New South Wales, Australia
- Height: 177 cm (5 ft 9 1/2 in)
- Weight: 81 kg (12 st 11 lb)

Playing information
- Position: Fullback, Wing
Club
Years	Team	Pld	T	G	FG	P
2008–10	Gold Coast Titans	4	0	0	0	0
Representative
Years	Team	Pld	T	G	FG	P
2007	Queensland Residents	1				8

Rugby union career
- Position(s): Fullback, Wing
National sevens team
Years	Team	Comps
2012-	Australia 7s	55
- Correct as of 23 December 2013
- Education: Palm Beach Currumbin State High School
- Relatives: Cody Walker (cousin); Ryan Walker (cousin)

Shannon Walker (born in Kyogle, New South Wales), is an Indigenous Australian professional rugby union footballer who plays Sevens Rugby for Australia. He previously played Rugby League with the Gold Coast Titans of the National Rugby League. His position of choice is as at fullback but he can play on the wing.

== Career ==
=== Before the NRL & Queensland Cup success ===
Shannon Walker grew up in the rural country town of Kyogle in a large family as one of eight children. Walker spent most of his adolescence growing up in his home town, with a move to Bundaberg, Queensland attending primary school at East Bundaberg SPS and representing the Bundaberg Primary Schoolboys Rep teams. Walker developed a passion for rugby league with the Kyogle Turkeys, playing for the club from the age of 5 and eventually playing first grade for the side at the age of 16. In 2006, a year after representing Kyogle in first grade, Walker moved north to the Gold Coast to further his professional league career. He enrolled with the renowned rugby league nursery Palm Beach Currumbin High School and in his first year with the college was selected for the 2006 Queensland Schoolboys team and 2006 Australian Schoolboys Tour of Britain and France, where in the Australians first match against Wales Walker was named man-of-the-match.

The following year in 2007 Walker began playing Colts rugby league for the Gold Coast Titans feeder club, the Tweed Heads Seagulls, where he shone at junior level and quickly elevated into playing in the Queensland Cup senior side. The Seagulls and Walker had a brilliant season as the club reached the Queensland Cup Grand-Final, where they defeated 2006 Premiers Redcliffe Dolphins 28-18 giving Walker an early taste of Premiership success. His performance through the season was duly recognized as he was awarded the 'Courier Mail Queensland Cup Player-of-the-Year Award' and Gold Coast Titans 'Young Player-of-the-Year'.

=== Gold Coast Titans ===
Many critics believe Walker's debut in the National Rugby League would most certainly be some time throughout the 2008 season. After his success in the Queensland Cup Walker headed the list of youngsters widely tipped to make an impact for the Titans and battle for an NRL debut. He further staked his claim for a Titans jersey when in the Gold Coast's first trial of 2008 against the Canberra Raiders, Walker scored in the highlight of the match showcasing his pace and footwork to beat the Raiders fullback on his way to the tryline. He made his debut for the Gold Coast Titans against the Canterbury Bulldogs on 16 May 2008. He was also believed to be fastest player in the NRL at the time.

On 8 May 2011 Walker announced he had signed a contract with ARU to join the Australian Sevens Squad.

In 2016, he was signed to a train and trial deal with the Gold Coast Titans and was named in one trial match against Parramatta Eels. He was also selected to play for Gold Coast Titans at the Inaugural Auckland Nines in 2016. However, as at April 2016, Walker is again playing with the Tweed Heads Seagulls in the Queensland Cup competition.
