= Brad Scheer =

Australian rules footballer

Personal information
- Full name: Brad Scheer
- Born: 31 August 1998 (age 28); Esperance, Western Australia
- Original team: Palm Beach Currumbin (QAFL)
- Draft: No. 67, 2016 national draft
- Debut: Round 7, 2017, Gold Coast vs. Geelong, at Metricon Stadium
- Height: 184 cm (6 ft 0 in)
- Weight: 84 kg (185 lb)
- Position: Midfielder

Playing career^{1}
Years	Club	Games (Goals)
2017–2019	Gold Coast	13 (2)
- ^{1} Playing statistics correct to the end of 2019.

Brad Scheer (born 31 August 1998) is a professional Australian rules footballer who played for the Gold Coast Football Club in the Australian Football League (AFL).

== Early life ==
Scheer was born in Esperance, Western Australia but moved to the Gold Coast at the age of 13. He played his junior football for the Palm Beach Currumbin Lions in the local Gold Coast league and set a club record for the youngest senior debutant at the age of 15. He also joined the Gold Coast Suns Academy in his teenage years while attending Palm Beach Currumbin High School.

He was selected to represent both Queensland and the Allies at the 2016 AFL Under 18 Championships. While playing for the Allies, Scheer kicked the game-winning goal from the boundary to seal a huge victory over the Victorian Country team. Despite spending the early part of his life in Western Australia, Scheer was eligible to be academy drafted by the Gold Coast Suns as he spent the required five years in their academy zone prior to being drafted.

Scheer was delisted at the end of the Suns' 2019 season, subsequently signing with the Southport Sharks.

In January 2020 Scheer pled guilty to drug possession after being caught with cocaine on a night out in December. He was charged with a three-month good behaviour bond and attended a drug education program.

Scheer announced his retirement from football in 2021 to focus on triathlons.

== AFL career ==
Scheer made his AFL debut in the Gold Coast's twenty-five point win against Geelong at Metricon Stadium in round seven of the 2017 season.
