= Cody Walker (rugby league) =

Australian rugby league footballer

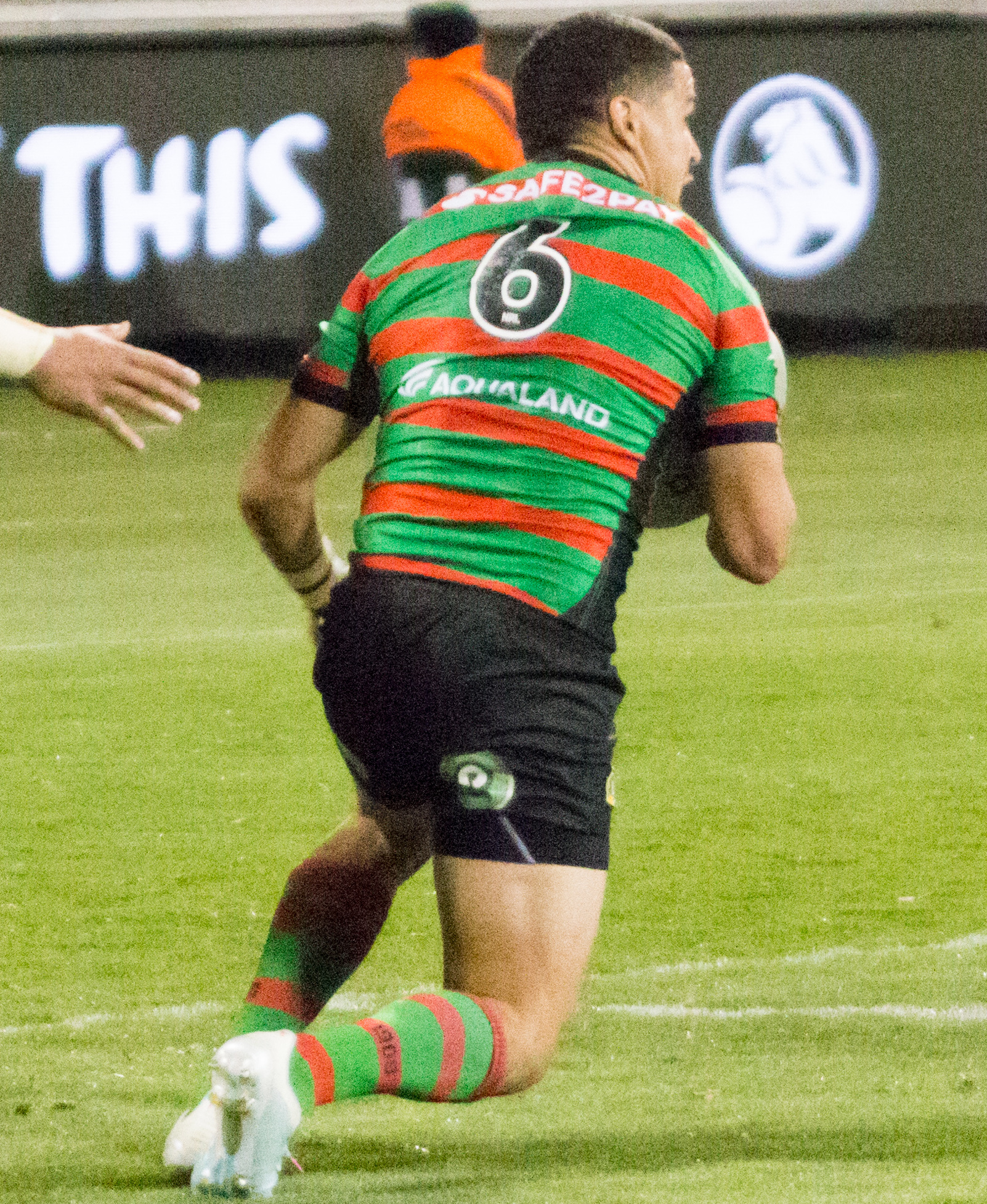

Personal information
- Born: 10 January 1990 (age 36) Nowra, New South Wales, Australia
- Height: 179 cm (5 ft 10 in)
- Weight: 90 kg (14 st 2 lb)

Playing information
- Position: Five-eighth, Fullback, Halfback
Club
Years	Team	Pld	T	G	FG	P
2016–	South Sydney	247	109	12	0	460
Representative
Years	Team	Pld	T	G	FG	P
2013	Queensland Residents	1	0	0	0	0
2017	Country NSW	1	0	0	0	0
2019–23	New South Wales	5	1	0	0	4
2019–21	Indigenous All Stars	2	1	0	0	4
2019–23	Prime Minister's XIII	2	1	0	0	4
- Source: As of 11 September 2026
- Education: Palm Beach Currumbin High School
- Relatives: Ryan Walker (brother); Shannon Walker (cousin); Daine Laurie (cousin)

Cody Walker (born 10 January 1990) is an Australian professional rugby league footballer who plays as a five-eighth and halfback for the South Sydney Rabbitohs in the NRL.

At representative level he has played for the Prime Minister's XIII, Country NSW and New South Wales in the State of Origin series. He played fullback earlier in his NRL career.

== Background ==
Walker was born in Nowra, on the South Coast region of New South Wales. He moved to Casino in the Northern Rivers region of New South Wales at a young age and is of Indigenous Australian descent - from Yuin and Bundjalung people. He attended Palm Beach Currumbin High School.

Walker is the younger brother of former Penrith Panthers player Ryan Walker and cousin of Gold Coast Titans player Shannon Walker.

He played his junior rugby league for the Casino Cougars, before being signed by the Gold Coast Titans on a four-year contract.

== Playing career ==
=== Early career ===
In 2009 and 2010, Walker played for the Gold Coast Titans' NYC team playing 36 games and scoring 25 tries for 100 points.

In 2011, he followed his brother Ryan to the Penrith Panthers and played for their New South Wales Cup team, the Windsor Wolves. In 2012, he joined the Eastern Suburbs Tigers in the Queensland Cup.

After impressing in the 2012 season, he was invited to train with the Melbourne Storm in the 2013 NRL pre-season, before returning to the Tigers for the 2013 Queensland Cup season.

On 17 July 2013, he played for the Queensland Residents against the New South Wales Residents. At the conclusion of the 2013 season, he won the Queensland Cup's Best and Fairest award as well as topping the competition for points scored.

In September 2013, he signed a one-year contract with the Melbourne Storm starting in 2014.

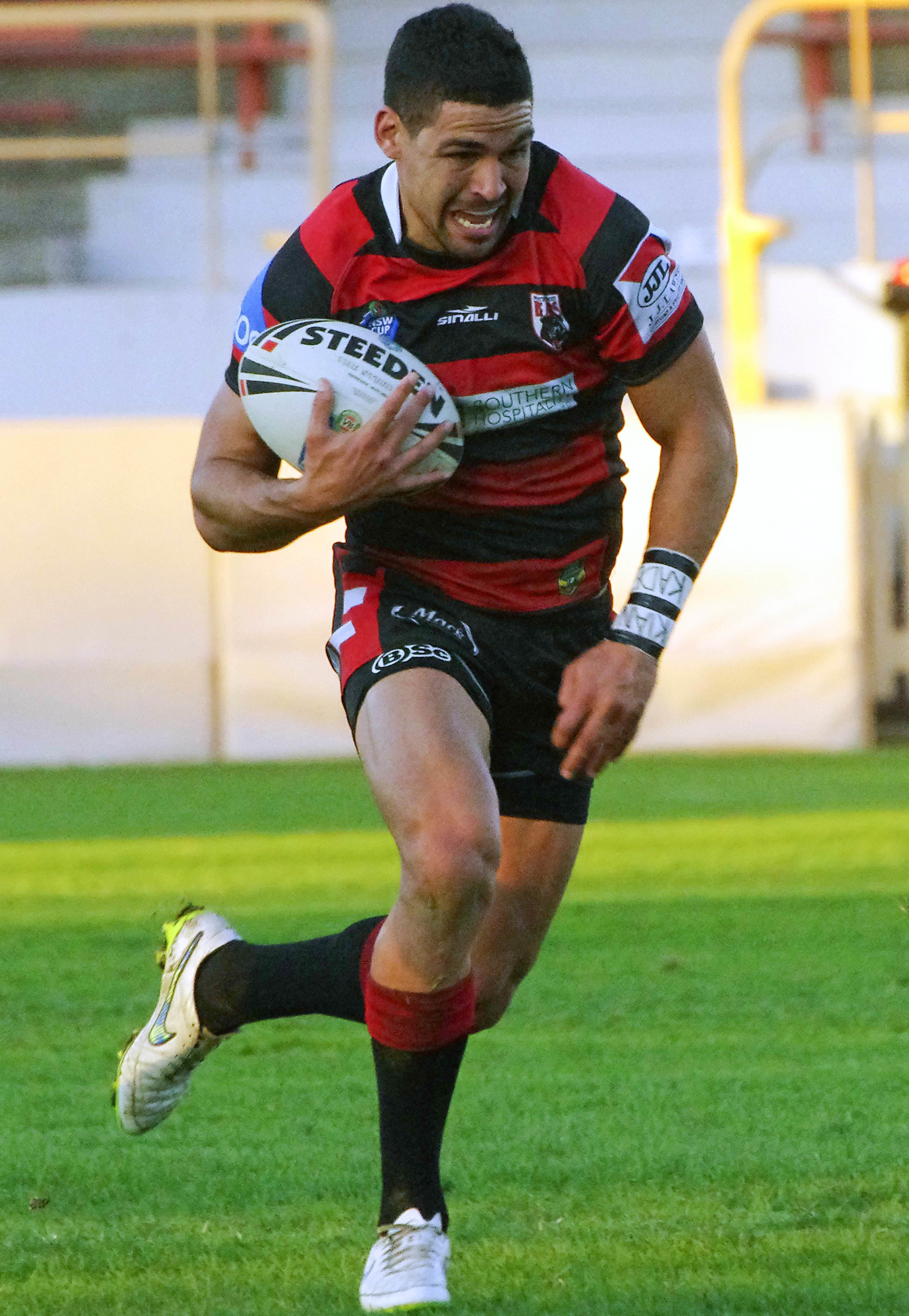
Walker playing for the North Sydney Bears in 2015

On 17 June 2014, he signed a two-year contract with the South Sydney Rabbitohs starting in 2015.

In 2015, Walker played for the North Sydney Bears in the NSW Cup. With Walker in the side, Norths made the finals series at seasons end. Another grand final win for Walker. He collected two awards for his contributions winning Best & Fairest and Players player at Norths' end of the year presentation.

=== 2016 ===
In Round 1 of the 2016 NRL season, Walker made his NRL debut for the South Sydney club against the Sydney Roosters, at five-eighth. He was one of the most influential players in his side's 42-10 win at Allianz Stadium. Whilst in that match, he was filling in for the suspended Luke Keary, an injury to halfback, Adam Reynolds saw Walker maintain his position. In round 5, Walker scored his first career try against the Manly Warringah Sea Eagles in the Rabbitohs' 16-12 win at Brookvale Oval. Despite multiple strong performances for Souths, Reynolds' return in Round 7 would push Walker out of the line-up. In Round 11, Walker was brought back into the side at the surprise position of fullback. Despite having never played the position since his teen years, he managed to set-up and score a try in his team's 34-24 win over the St. George Illawarra Dragons. Afterwards, on 1 June, he re-signed with the South Sydney side on a two-year contract. However, it was later revealed that he never put pen to paper before South Sydney made the announcement, leaving the contract up in the air. In July, he officially signed a three-year contract with the Rabbitohs until the end of 2019. He finished the 2016 season playing 20 games, scoring eight tries and making 12 try-assists.

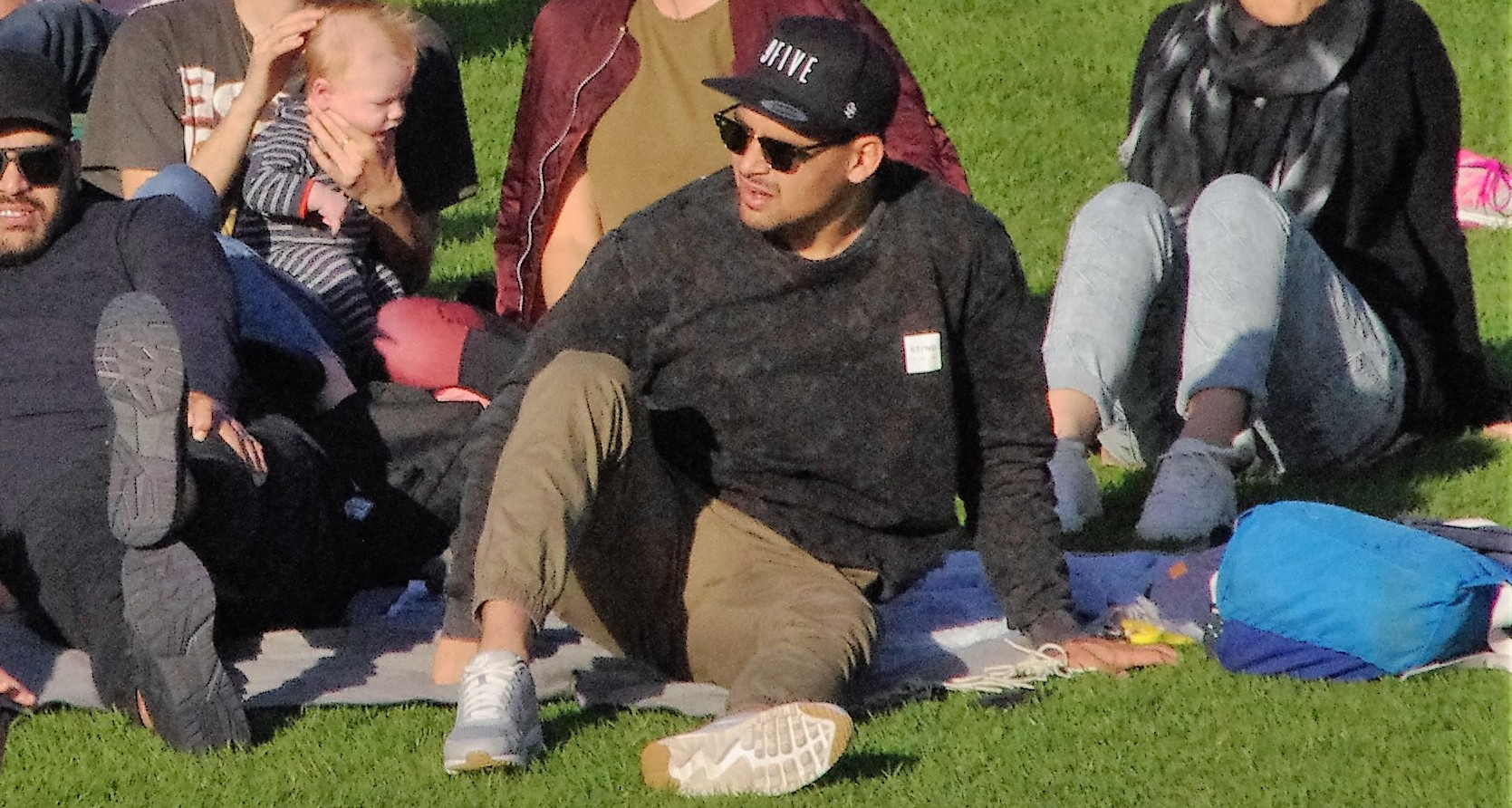
Walker in 2017

=== 2017 ===
Walker was named in the South Sydney squad for the 2017 NRL Auckland Nines. On 1 May 2017, Walker was named in The NSW Country representative side to take on The NSW City representative side in the last ever City vs Country game. Walker alternated between Five-eighth and Fullback throughout the year as South Sydney struggled to cope with a season ending injury to Captain Greg Inglis in the opening round of the season. Walker finished the year playing all 24 games and not missing a single minute. He scored six tries while topping the Try Assists (18), Line Breaks (16) and Line Break Assists (20) charts for all Five-eighths.

=== 2018 ===
Walker played every game for Souths in 2018 scoring 12 tries as the club finished third on the table and qualified for the finals. Souths went on to reach the preliminary final against arch rivals the Sydney Roosters but lost the match 12-4 at the Sydney Football Stadium in front of a ground record crowd of 44,380.

=== 2019 ===
In Round 5 against the New Zealand Warriors, Walker scored 4 tries as Souths won the match 28-24 at the Sunshine Coast Stadium. On 27 May, Walker's good form at club level earned him selection for New South Wales against Queensland in the 2019 State of Origin series. Following New South Wales defeat in Game 1, Walker was one of the players dropped from the team for Game 2 by coach Brad Fittler. Walker was also one of the New South Wales players who refused to sing the Australian National Anthem before the start of Game 1.

Walker made a total of 25 appearances for Souths in the 2019 NRL season as the club finished third on the table and qualified for the finals. Walker scored a try in the club's elimination finals victory over Manly-Warringah at ANZ Stadium. Walker played in the club's preliminary final defeat against the Canberra Raiders at Canberra Stadium. During the first half of the game, Walker failed to ground the ball over the line, knocked out of his grasp by a try saving tackle from Canberra player Josh Hodgson.

On 30 September, Walker was named at 5/8 for the Australia PM XIII side. On 7 October, Walker was named in the Australian side for the 2019 Rugby League World Cup 9s. On 18 December, Walker signed a contract extension to remain at South Sydney until the end of the 2022 season.

=== 2020 ===
In round 12 of the 2020 NRL season, Walker scored two tries for Souths as they defeated St. George 32-24 at Kogarah Oval.

In round 20, Walker scored two tries and was man-of-the-match in South Sydney's 60-8 victory over arch-rivals the Sydney Roosters at ANZ Stadium. Peter Sterling described Walker's contribution to the unexpected victory as "the best individual performance I have seen this year" and "as near perfect as I have seen."

Walker made a total of 21 appearances throughout the season and scored ten tries. He played in South Sydney's preliminary final defeat against Penrith as the club fell short of a grand final appearance for a third year in a row.

Walker was selected by New South Wales for the 2020 State of Origin series. He played in all three games as Queensland upset New South Wales winning the series 2-1.

=== 2021 ===
In round 3 of the 2021 NRL season, Walker scored two tries in a 26-16 victory over arch rivals the Sydney Roosters. The following week, he scored two tries in a 38-0 victory over Canterbury-Bankstown in the traditional Good Friday game.

In round 10, Walker scored two tries for South Sydney in their 32-22 victory over Cronulla-Sutherland.

In the 2021 Finals Series, Walker scored two tries for South Sydney in a 36-16 victory over Manly in the preliminary final. On 27 September, Walker was named Dally M Five Eighth of the year.

Walker played a total of 25 games for South Sydney in the 2021 NRL season and scored 16 tries including one try in South Sydney's 2021 NRL Grand Final loss against Penrith. In the second half, Walker threw a long pass which was intercepted by Penrith player Stephen Crichton who raced away to score a try when both teams were locked at 8-8. Walker later redeemed himself by setting up a try late in the second half but South Sydney fell short losing 14-12. On 1 November, Walker signed a one-year contract extension with South Sydney which would keep him at the club until the end of the 2023 season.

=== 2022 ===
In round 12 of the 2022 NRL season, Walker scored two tries for South Sydney in a 44-18 victory over Wests Tigers. Walker played 27 games for South Sydney in the 2022 NRL season including all three of the clubs finals matches as they reached the preliminary final for a fifth straight season. Souths would lose in the preliminary final to eventual premiers Penrith 32-12.

In December, Walker signed a two-year contract extension, keeping him at South Sydney until the end of the 2025 season.

=== 2023 ===
In round 4 of the 2023 NRL season, Walker scored two tries for South Sydney as they defeated Manly 13-12 in golden point extra-time. On 3 July, Walker was selected by New South Wales for game 3 of the 2023 State of Origin series. Walker won man of the match in the Blues 24-10 win to avoid a series whitewash. Walker played a total of 22 games for Souths in the 2023 NRL season as the club finished 9th on the table and missed the finals.

=== 2024 ===
In round 10, Walker played his 200th first grade game against St. George Illawarra. Walker became only the ninth player in South Sydney's history to play 200 games for the club. In round 14 of the 2024 NRL season, Walker scored two tries for South Sydney in their 46-12 victory over the Gold Coast. Walker played 21 games for South Sydney throughout the 2024 season as the club endured a tough campaign winning only eight matches all year and finishing 16th on the table.

=== 2025 ===
On 14 July, Walker was ruled out for the rest of the season after suffering recurring calf injuries. On 3 September, South Sydney announced that Walker had signed on for a further season. Walker was limited to only 11 games for South Sydney in the 2025 NRL season which saw the club finish 14th on the table.

=== 2026 ===
Walker played 24 matches for South Sydney in the 2026 NRL season as the club finished 6th on the table and qualified for the finals. Walker was taken from the field with a season ending injury during the club's upset elimination finals loss to Newcastle. On 16 November 2026, the Rabbitohs announced that Walker had re-signed with the club for a further year, with a club option for a second year.

== Statistics ==
*

Year	Team	Games	Tries	Goals	Pts
2016	South Sydney Rabbitohs	20	8	10	52
2017	South Sydney Rabbitohs	24	6		24
2018	South Sydney Rabbitohs	27	12		48
2019	South Sydney Rabbitohs	25	16		64
2020	South Sydney Rabbitohs	21	10		40
2021	South Sydney Rabbitohs	25	16		64
2022	South Sydney Rabbitohs	27	14		56
2023	South Sydney Rabbitohs	22	9		36
2024	South Sydney Rabbitohs	21	8	2	36
2025	South Sydney Rabbitohs	11	1		4
2026	South Sydney Rabbitohs	24	9		36
2027	South Sydney Rabbitohs				
	Totals	247	109	12	460

== Controversy ==
On 22 May 2020, Walker was given a two-match ban by the NRL and also a $15,000 suspended fine after a video emerged of him kung-fu kicking a man who was involved in a fight with another person in Casino, New South Wales. The video was recorded in December 2019, but it only became public knowledge after one of the men threatened to release it by blackmailing Walker for $20,000. South Sydney were also fined $20,000 for not informing the NRL of the incident.
