= Salk Oval =

Sports venue in Palm Beach, Queensland

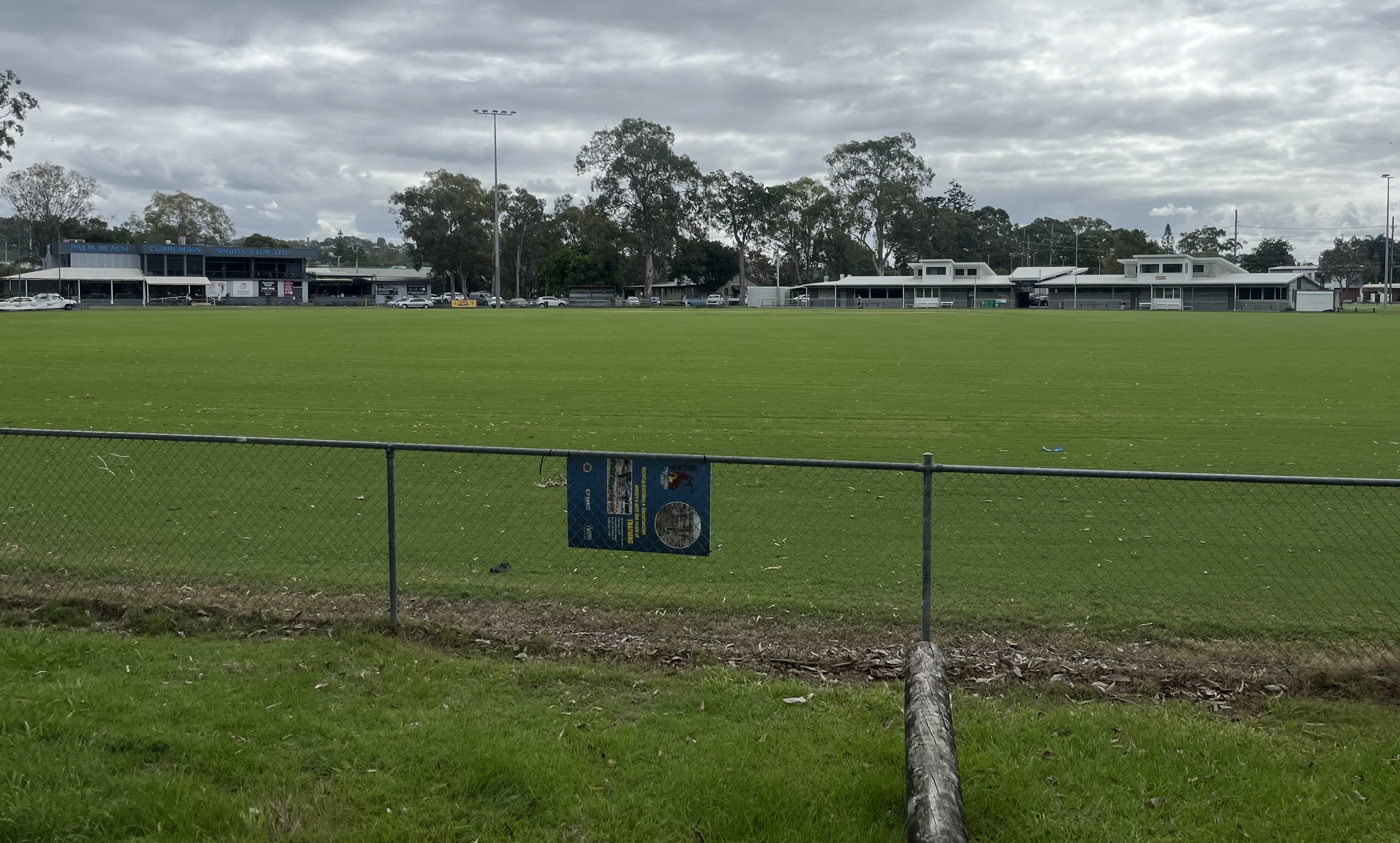
- Salk Oval in March 2026
- Interactive map of Salk Oval
- Address: Sarawak Ave; Palm Beach, Queensland
- Coordinates: 28.13490°S 153.47350°E
- Owner: Gold Coast City Council
- Record attendance: 4,000 (Surfers Paradise vs PBC, 4 September 1965)

Construction
- Groundbreaking: 1958; 68 years ago
- Opened: 1961; 65 years ago

Tenants
- Palm Beach Currumbin Football Club; Palm Beach Currumbin Cricket Club

Salk Oval is an Australian rules football and cricket venue in the Gold Coast suburb of Palm Beach. Since 2025, it has been known as Stalagmite Oval under naming rights with the Stalagmite Property Group.

It is the home of the Palm Beach Currumbin Football Club in the Queensland Australian Football League (QAFL) and the Palm Beach Currumbin Cricket Club.

== History ==
Salk Oval was opened when the Palm Beach Currumbin Football Club (originally known as Central) was formed in 1961 for the new Gold Coast Australian Football League (GCAFL). Club president Bert Willis, who was from South Australia, insisted that the playing field located between Thrower Drive and the railway line had to be the size and shape for "proper football".

For unknown reasons, the ground was named after American physician Jonas Salk, who developed one of the first successful polio vaccines.

The first football match at Salk Oval was held on 9 July 1961, which saw Central defeat Southport by 25 points. Several GCAFL grand finals were played at the ground until the 1980s, including the 1965 grand final, when a crowd of 4,000 people watched Palm Beach Currumbin defeat Surfers Paradise by 20 points.

On 12 December 1978, a World Series Cricket (WSC) match was played at Salk Oval between the West Indies XI and the Cavaliers XI.

In 2015, the ground hosted a North East Australian Football League (NEAFL) match for the first time, with Southport defeating Brisbane by eight points.

== Transport access ==
Salk Oval is planned to be served by the G:link light rail line as part of the line's Stage 4 extension to Coolangatta, with the proposed Thrower Drive station located approximately fifteen minutes' walk away. On 1 September 2025, the Crisafulli state government announced the cancellation of the Stage 4 extension.
