= Caleb Graham =

Australian rules footballer (born 2000)

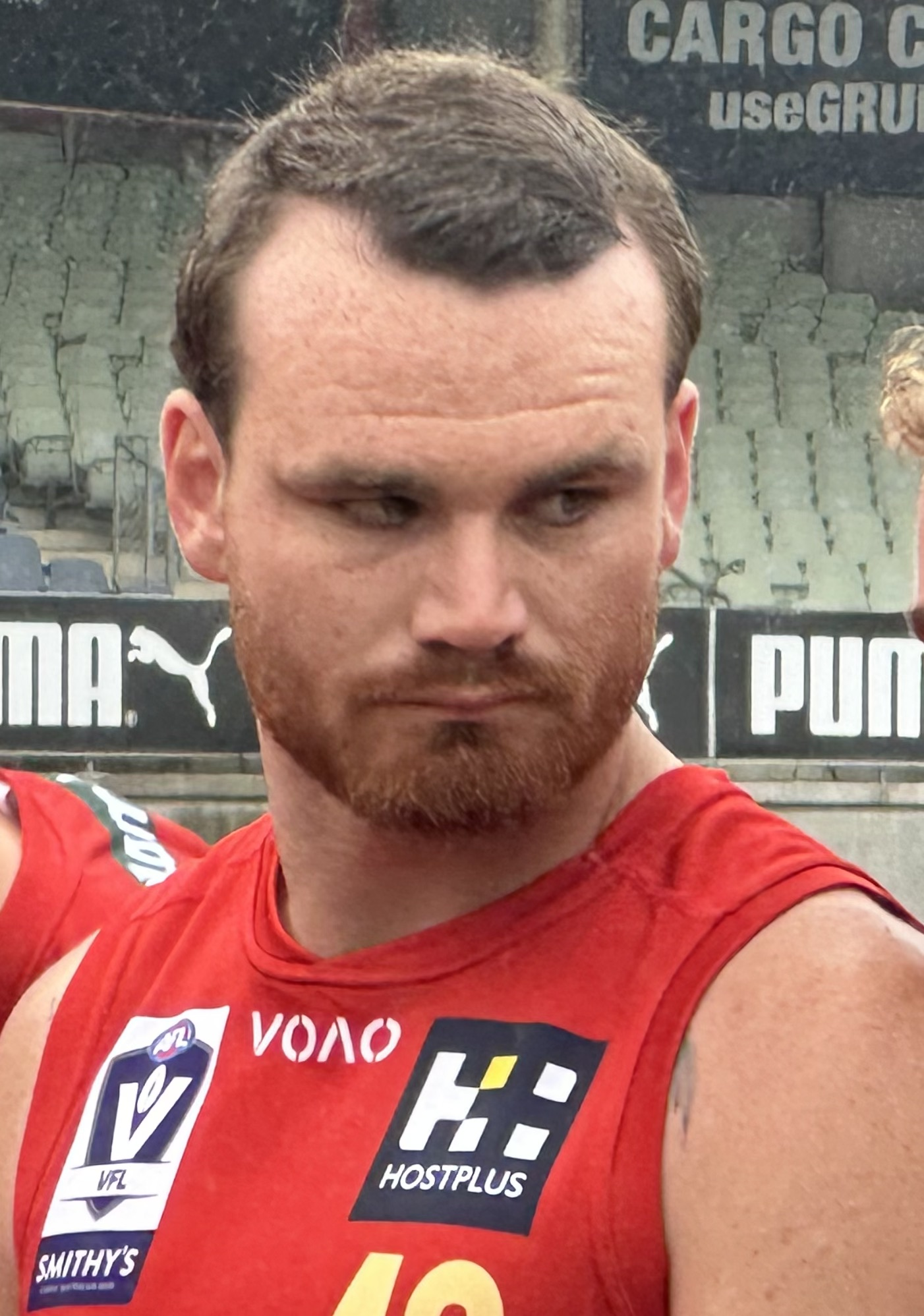
- Graham in July 2026

Personal information
- Full name: Caleb Graham
- Nickname: Crab
- Born: 12 September 2000 (age 26); Cairns, Queensland
- Original team: Palm Beach Currumbin (QAFL)
- Draft: No. 71, 2018 national draft
- Height: 195 cm (6 ft 5 in)
- Weight: 92 kg (203 lb)
- Position: Defender

Playing career^{1}
Years	Club	Games (Goals)
2019–2026	Gold Coast	37 (1)
- ^{1} Playing statistics correct to the end of 2026.

Career highlights
- VFL premiership player: 2023

Caleb Graham (born 12 September 2000) is a former professional Australian rules footballer who played for the Gold Coast Football Club in the Australian Football League (AFL).

== Early life ==
Graham was born and raised in Cairns, Queensland. He began playing junior football for the North Cairns Tigers at five years of age. Graham later switched to the Cairns Saints and was placed in the Gold Coast Suns Academy as a teenager. At the start of 2016, he relocated with his family to the Gold Coast where he started playing locally for the Palm Beach Currumbin Australian Football Club and attended Palm Beach Currumbin State High School. While at Palm Beach Currumbin he played in back-to-back QAFL senior premierships, including playing on former AFL Premiership forward Barry Hall at 17 years and 10 days of age in the 2017 QAFL Grand Final.

In November 2018, he was drafted by the Gold Coast Football Club with pick 71 in the AFL draft.

== AFL career ==
Graham made his AFL debut at 18 years of age in Round 21 of the 2019 AFL season, which also happened to be QClash18 against the Brisbane Lions.

At the conclusion of the 2026 AFL season, having not played a senior game since 2022, Graham was delisted by the Suns.

== Statistics ==
Statistics are correct to the end of 2026

Legend
G	Goals	K	Kicks	D	Disposals	T	Tackles
B	Behinds	H	Handballs	M	Marks	H/O	Hit-outs

Season	Team	No.	Games	Totals								Averages (per game)							
Season	Team	No.	Games	G	B	K	H	D	M	T	H/O	G	B	K	H	D	M	T	H/O
2019	Gold Coast	46	3	0	0	18	17	35	11	4	0	0.0	0.0	6.0	5.7	11.7	3.7	1.3	0.0
2020 (Note: The 2020 season was played with 17 home-and-away matches per team (down from 22) and 16-minute quarters with time on (down from 20-minute quarters with time on) due to the impact of the COVID-19 pandemic.)	Gold Coast	46	7	0	0	36	14	50	25	2	0	0.0	0.0	5.1	2.0	7.1	3.6	0.3	0.0
2021	Gold Coast	46	12	0	1	52	33	85	42	8	82	0.0	0.1	4.3	2.8	7.1	3.5	0.7	6.8
2022	Gold Coast	46	15	1	0	95	38	133	52	14	2	0.1	0.0	6.3	2.5	8.9	3.5	0.9	0.1
2023	Gold Coast	46	0	–	–	–	–	–	–	–	–	–	–	–	–	–	–	–	–
2024	Gold Coast	46	0	–	–	–	–	–	–	–	–	–	–	–	–	–	–	–	–
2025	Gold Coast	46	0	–	–	–	–	–	–	–	–	–	–	–	–	–	–	–	–
2026	Gold Coast	46	0	–	–	–	–	–	–	–	–	–	–	–	–	–	–	–	–
Career			37	1	1	201	102	303	130	28	84	0.0	0.0	5.4	2.8	8.2	3.5	0.8	2.3
