= Ryan Walker (rugby league) =

Australian rugby league footballer (born 1986)

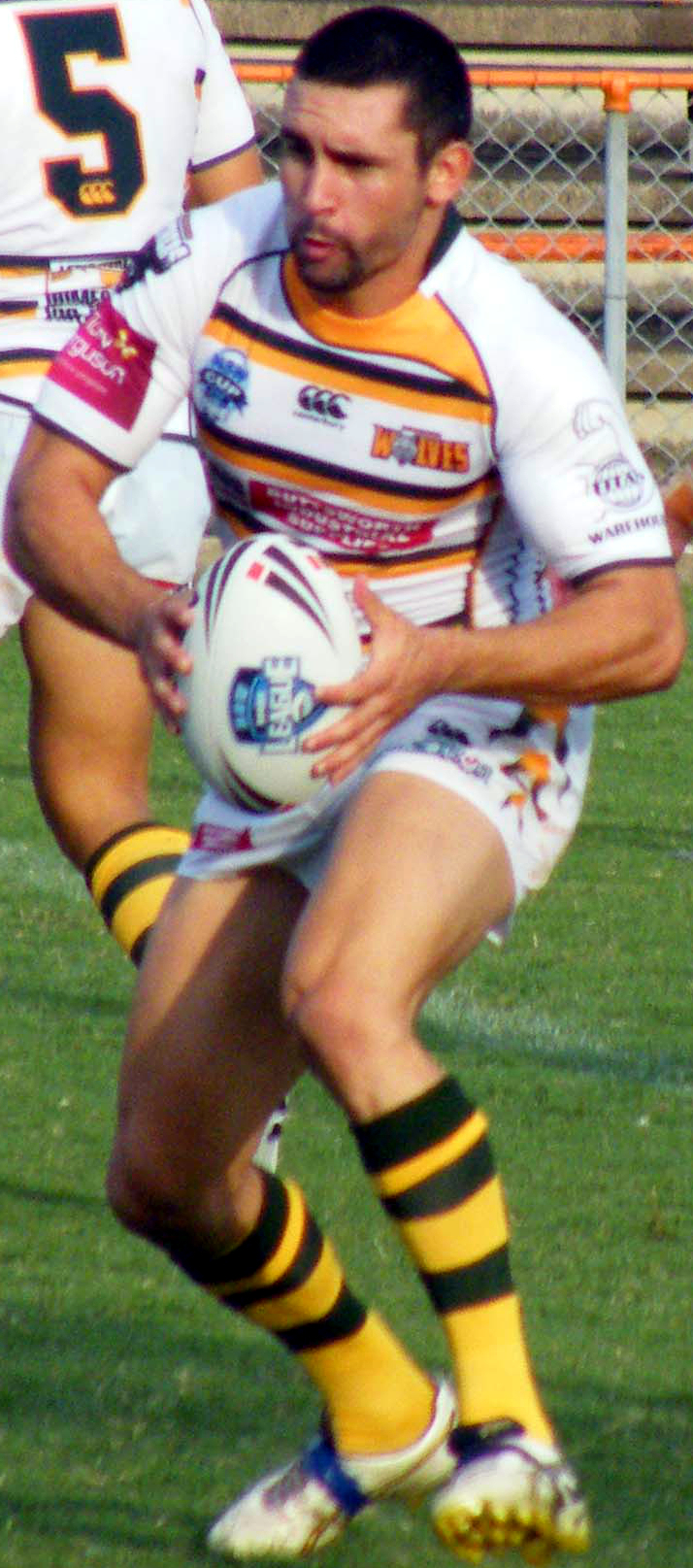

Personal information
- Full name: Ryan Walker
- Born: 12 July 1986 (age 40)
- Height: 183 cm (6 ft 0 in)
- Weight: 94 kg (14 st 11 lb)

Playing information
- Position: Wing, Centre, Five-eighth
Club
Years	Team	Pld	T	G	FG	P
2011	Penrith Panthers	3	1	0	0	4
- Source: As of 31 December 2017
- Relatives: Cody Walker (brother); Shannon Walker (cousin); Daine Laurie (cousin)

Ryan Walker (born 12 July 1986) is a rugby league footballer who formerly played for the Penrith Panthers in the NRL. His position of choice is five eighth. He played his junior rugby league for the Maclean Magpies and Casino Cougars.

== Playing career ==
Walker played for the Sunshine Coast in their 2009 Queensland Cup premiership winning side. In 2010, Walker signed for Windsor. In 2011, Walker joined Penrith and made his first grade debut for the club in round 21 of the 2011 NRL season against North Queensland. Walker made two further appearances for Penrith that year. In 2012, he moved to Newcastle, signing with the Maitland Pickers in the Newcastle Rugby League competition. In 2016, Walker played for Newcastle in the NSW Cup competition. After being released by Newcastle, he played for Wests Newcastle in the local competition. In 2023, Walker played for the Tweed Seagulls in the Queensland Cup.

== Personal life ==
Walker is the older brother of South Sydney Rabbitohs player Cody Walker and cousin of former Gold Coast Titans player Shannon Walker.
