= Daine Laurie (rugby league, born 1999) =

Australian rugby league footballer

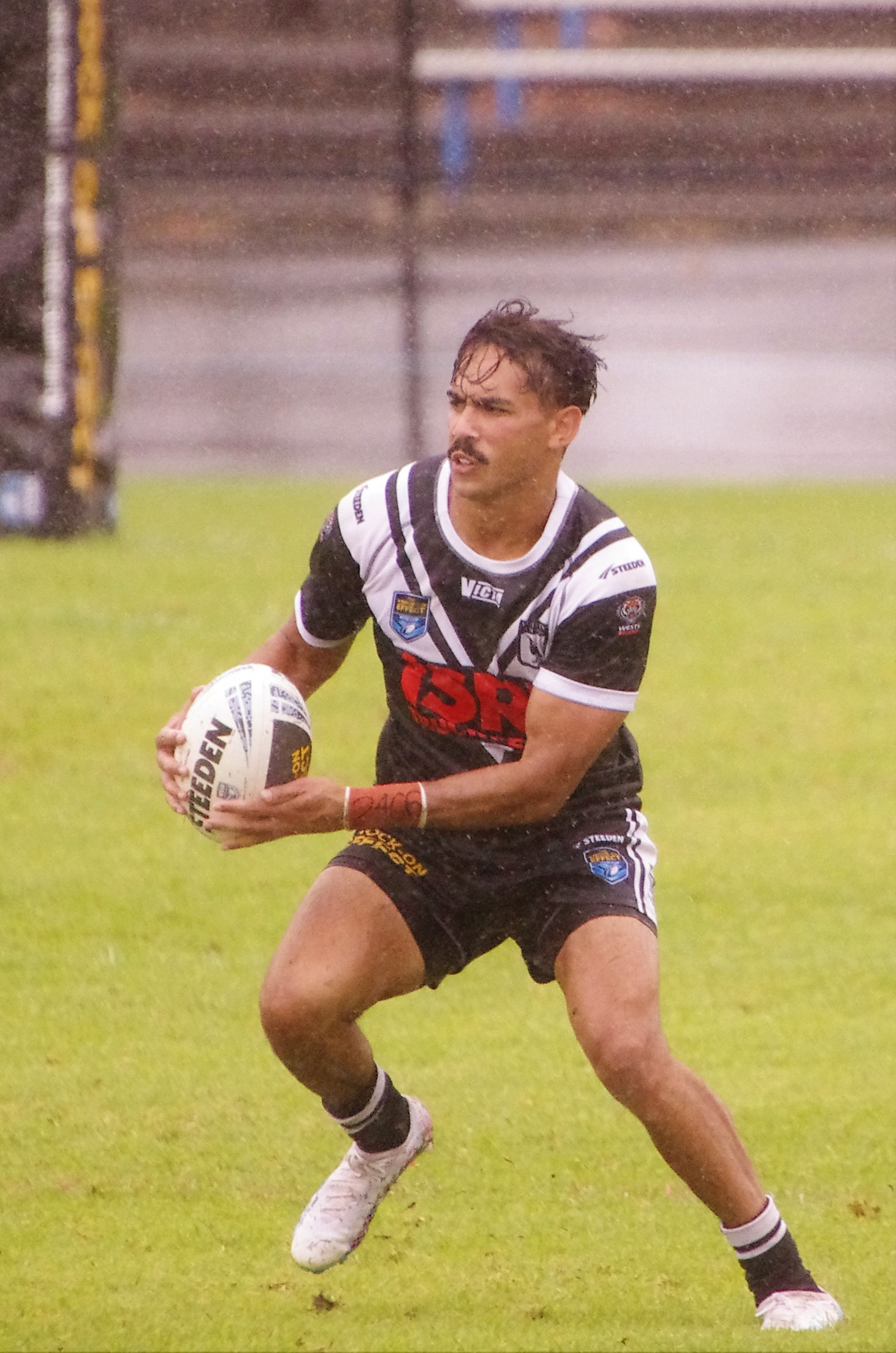

Personal information
- Born: 20 July 1999 (age 27) Sydney, New South Wales, Australia
- Height: 180 cm (5 ft 11 in)
- Weight: 87 kg (13 st 10 lb)

Playing information
- Position: Fullback, Five-eighth
Club
Years	Team	Pld	T	G	FG	P
2020	Penrith Panthers	3	0	0	0	0
2021–23	Wests Tigers	49	11	0	0	44
2024–25	Penrith Panthers	23	4	0	0	16
2026–	Canberra Raiders	15	4	0	0	16
	Total	90	19	0	0	76
Representative
Years	Team	Pld	T	G	FG	P
2022	Prime Minister's XIII	1	1	0	0	4
2023	Indigenous All Stars	1	0	0	0	0
- Source: As of 21 August 2026
- Relatives: Daine Laurie (uncle); Cody Walker (cousin); Ryan Walker (cousin)

Daine Laurie (born 20 July 1999) is a professional rugby league footballer who plays as a fullback, five-eighth, lock or centre for the Canberra Raiders in the National Rugby League.

He previously played for the Penrith Panthers and the Wests Tigers in the National Rugby League (NRL).

== Background ==
Laurie was born in Sydney, but was raised in Iluka, New South Wales, where his family is from. He is of Indigenous Australian descent, from the Bundjalung and Yaegl people, and is a relative of Cody Walker. Laurie is the nephew of his namesake Daine Laurie.

Laurie played his junior rugby league for the Lower Clarence Magpies and Grafton Ghosts before joining the Penrith Panthers in 2017.

== Playing career ==
=== Early years ===
In 2017, Laurie joined Penrith and played with their S. G. Ball Cup squad. In 2018, he was named Penrith's Jersey Flegg Cup player of the year.

=== 2020 ===
In August, Laurie made his first grade debut in round 13 of the 2020 NRL season for Penrith against the Canberra Raiders.

=== 2021 ===
Laurie signed with the Wests Tigers until the end of the 2023 season. However, it was announced on 2 August that he would miss the rest of the 2021 NRL season after suffering a broken fibula in the Wests Tigers round 20 loss against the New Zealand Warriors. Otherwise, Laurie had a breakout rookie season, which saw him nominated for the 2021 RLPA Players' Champion award.

On 6 October, a photo of Penrith-born Laurie wearing a jersey of his former club (Penrith) and celebrating that club's 2021 NRL Grand Final victory over South Sydney was shared to the media, despite him being contracted to the Wests Tigers. Laurie later apologised over the incident saying "Silly by me, silly mistake, but I am really sorry for it".

=== 2022 ===
Laurie played a total of 19 matches for the Wests Tigers in the 2022 NRL season.

In March, a Newcastle fan reportedly spotted Laurie and a Wests Tigers team-mate playing poker machines in a Newcastle hotel at 10 pm on the eve of an unsuccessful Tigers match against Newcastle. The drama was described as "blown out of proportion". No NRL or club disciplinary action was taken as no integrity rules were breached.

On 25 September, Laurie scored a try for the 2022 Australian Men's Prime Minister's XIII in their 64–14 victory over the Papuan New Guinea Prime Minister's XIII at Suncorp Stadium.

=== 2023 ===
On 21 July, Laurie signed a one-year deal to rejoin his former club Penrith, starting in 2024. Laurie played eleven games for the Wests Tigers in the 2023 NRL season and scored two tries. Wests Tigers would finish with the Wooden Spoon for a second consecutive season.

=== 2024 ===
On 3 July, Laurie had re-signed with Penrith on a one-year extension. Laurie played 15 games for Penrith in the 2024 NRL season but did not feature in the clubs grand final victory over Melbourne.

=== 2025 ===
On 9 September, it was announced that Laurie would be departing Penrith at the end of the 2025 NRL season after not being offered a new contract by the club. On 11 November, Canberra announced that they had signed Laurie on a three-year deal.

=== 2026 ===
In round 21 of the 2026 NRL season, Laurie scored a hat-trick off the interchange bench in Canberra's 56-10 victory over his former club the Wests Tigers. Laurie was limited to only 15 games for Canberra in the 2026 NRL season as the club finished 11th on the table and missed the finals.

== Statistics ==
Year	Team	Games	Tries	Pts
2020	Penrith Panthers	3		
2021	Wests Tigers	19	7	28
2022	Wests Tigers	19	2	8
2023	Wests Tigers	11	2	8
2024	Penrith Panthers	15	2	8
2025	Penrith Panthers	9	2	8
2026	Canberra Raiders	14	4	16
	Totals	91	19	76
