= Ethan Read =

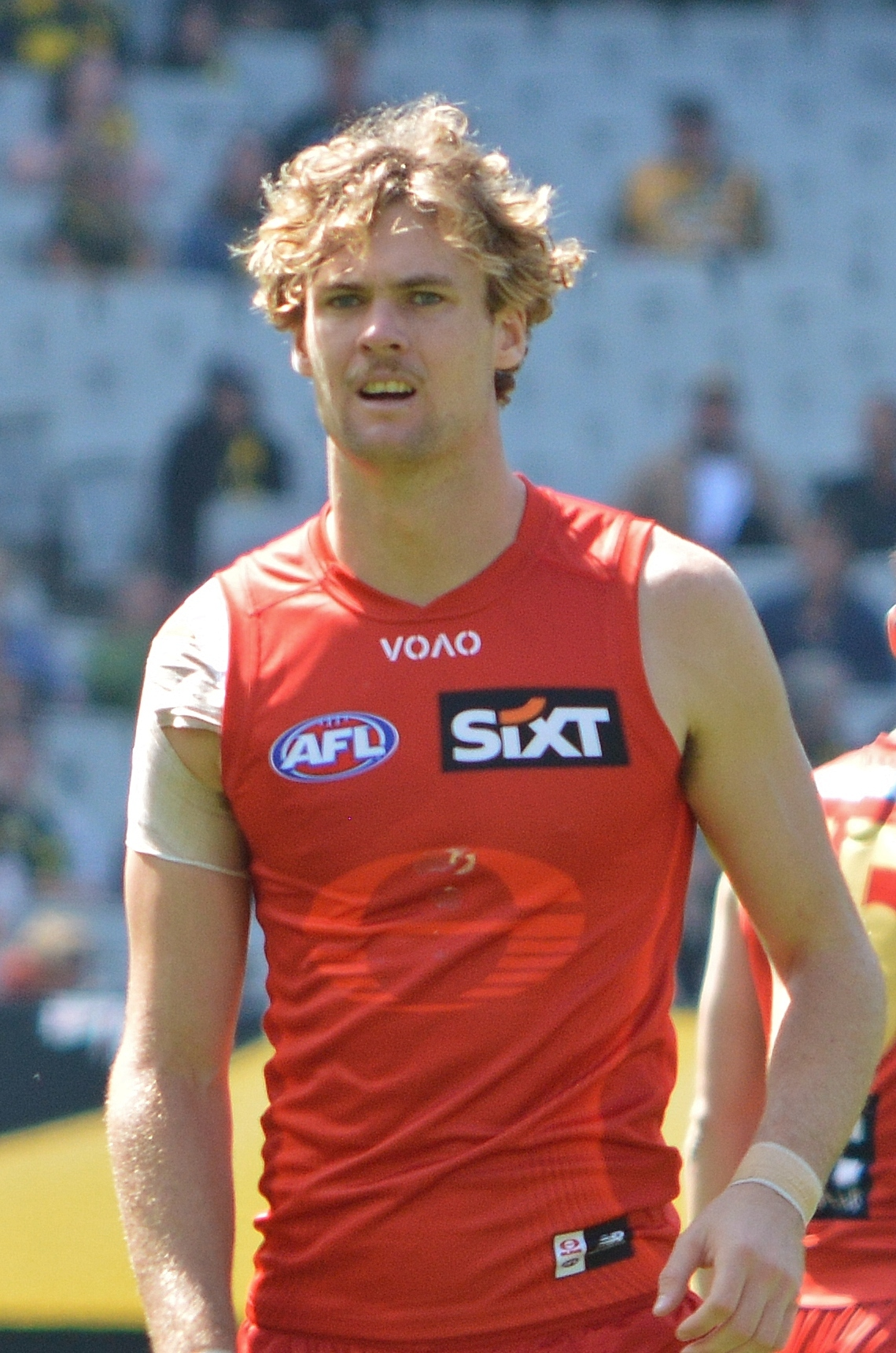
- Read in March 2026

Personal information
- Full name: Ethan Read
- Nicknames: Creek, The Unicorn
- Born: 7 July 2005 (age 21); Gold Coast, Queensland
- Original team: Palm Beach Currumbin (QAFL) / Gold Coast Suns Academy (Talent League)
- Draft: No. 9, 2023 AFL draft
- Height: 202 cm (6 ft 8 in)
- Weight: 92 kg (203 lb)
- Positions: Ruck, Forward

Club information
- Current club: Gold Coast
- Number: 20

Playing career^{1}
Years	Club	Games (Goals)
2024–	Gold Coast	38 (34)
- ^{1} Playing statistics correct to the end of round 22, 2026.

Career highlights
- AFL Rising Star nominee: 2025

Ethan Read is a professional Australian rules footballer who was selected by the Gold Coast Suns with the ninth pick in the 2023 AFL draft.

== Early life ==
Read was born and raised on the Gold Coast where he attended St Andrews Lutheran College throughout his upbringing. He began playing junior football at nine years of age when signed up to play for the Palm Beach Currumbin Lions alongside future AFL teammates Jed Walter and Will Graham. Read joined the Gold Coast Suns Academy at 13 years of age, but was not considered a standout in his early teenage years.

At 16 years of age, Read experienced an 11 cm growth spurt and he was subsequently put on the radar of several AFL teams due to his newly developed 200 cm frame. The following year he received national exposure for the first time when as a bottom ager he was selected to represent the Allies several times in the U18 National Championships as well as the Gold Coast Suns Academy in the U19 Talent League. His performances at the representative and club levels led to Read being placed in the AFL's 30-player National Academy program on the eve of his draft year and he was generally considered a second round draft prospect at the time.

Read appeared in the Allies' first U18 National Championship win and his performances earned him the starting ruckman position in the 2023 U18 All-Australian team. A month later he made his VFL debut for the Gold Coast, accruing 12 disposals and four behinds. In mid-November, he finished second in the national combine 2km time trial by running a 5:56 and was rated as highly as the third best prospect in the 2023 draft pool by some recruiters. A week later, he was drafted to his hometown team the Gold Coast Suns with pick 9 in the 2023 AFL draft after the Suns elected to match a bid from the Geelong Cats. Read grew up supporting the Gold Coast Suns and described being drafted to the club with his friends as a "dream come true".

== AFL career ==
Read made his AFL debut for the Suns at 18 years of age in round 4 of the 2024 season against the Greater Western Sydney Giants in Mount Barker and kicked a goal in his first game. In May 2024, Read extended his contract with the Suns until 2028.

In round 21 of the 2025 AFL season Read kicked two goals to earn himself a nomination for the 2025 AFL rising star.

== Statistics ==
Updated to the end of round 22, 2026.

Legend
G	Goals	K	Kicks	D	Disposals	T	Tackles
B	Behinds	H	Handballs	M	Marks	H/O	Hit-outs

Season	Team	No.	Games	Totals								Averages (per game)								Votes
Season	Team	No.	Games	G	B	K	H	D	M	T	H/O	G	B	K	H	D	M	T	H/O	Votes
2024	Gold Coast	20	4	3	1	9	9	18	4	1	15	0.8	0.3	2.3	2.3	4.5	1.0	0.3	3.8	0
2025	Gold Coast	20	21	19	20	110	49	159	56	30	87	0.9	1.0	5.2	2.3	7.6	2.7	1.4	4.1	0
2026	Gold Coast	20	13	12	7	72	54	126	35	15	31	0.9	0.5	5.5	4.2	9.7	2.7	1.2	2.4	0
Career			38	34	28	191	112	303	95	46	133	0.9	0.7	5.0	2.9	8.0	2.5	1.2	3.5	0
