= Will Graham (footballer) =

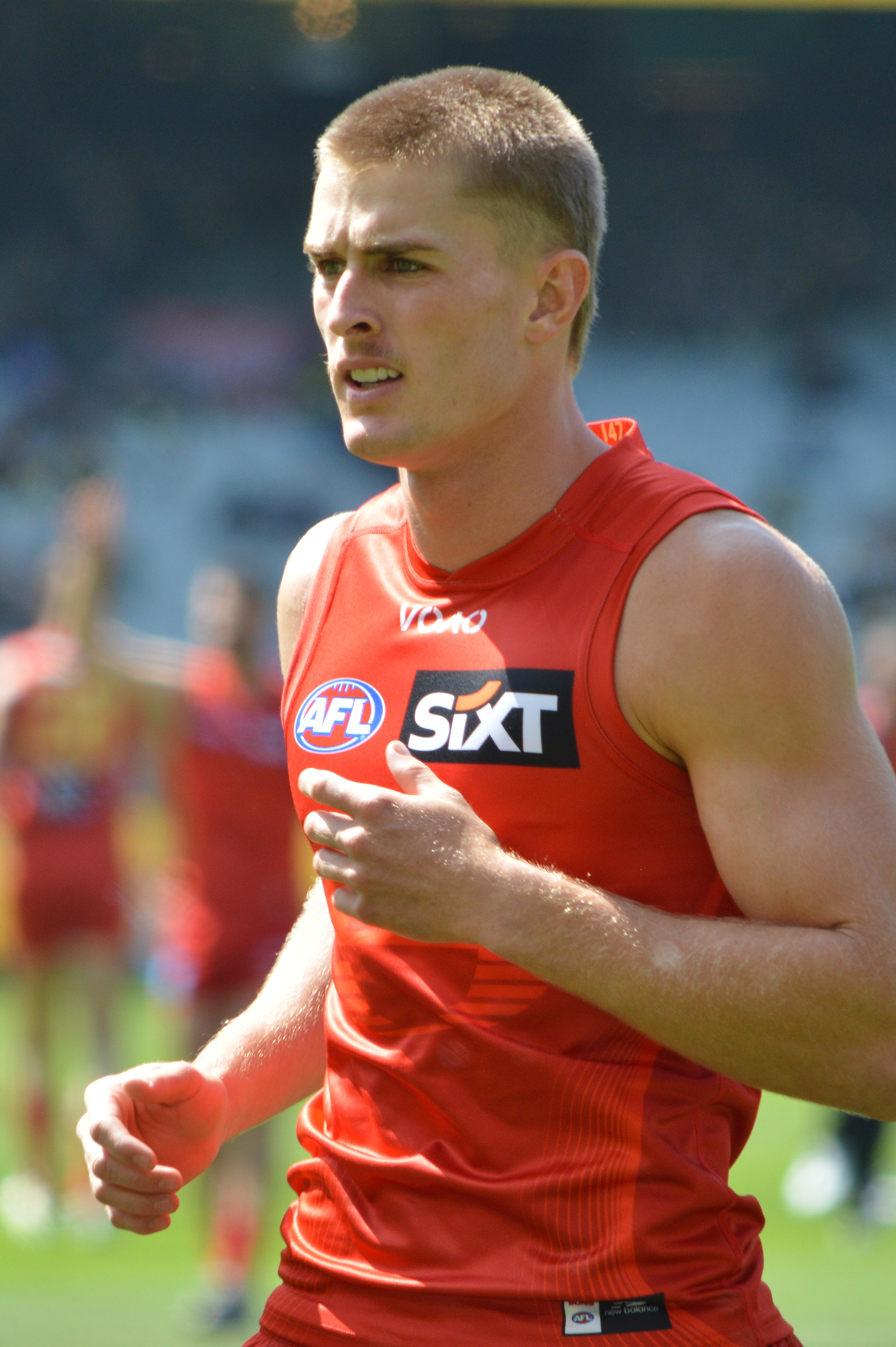
- Graham in March 2026

Personal information
- Full name: Will Graham
- Born: 27 July 2005 (age 21); Gold Coast, Queensland
- Original team: Palm Beach Currumbin (QAFL) / Gold Coast Suns Academy (Talent League)
- Draft: No. 26, 2023 AFL draft
- Height: 186 cm (6 ft 1 in)
- Position: Midfielder

Club information
- Current club: Gold Coast
- Number: 26

Playing career^{1}
Years	Club	Games (Goals)
2024–	Gold Coast	37 (23)
- ^{1} Playing statistics correct to the end of round 22, 2026.

Career highlights
- AFL Rising Star nominee: 2024

Will Graham (born 27 July 2005) is a professional Australian rules footballer who was selected by the Gold Coast Suns with pick 26 in the 2023 AFL draft.

== Early life ==
Graham was born and raised on the Gold Coast where he attended Palm Beach Currumbin State High School throughout his teenage years. He began playing junior football at six years of age when signed up to play for the Palm Beach Currumbin Lions alongside future AFL teammates Jed Walter and Ethan Read. Graham joined the Gold Coast Suns Academy at 12 years of age and has stated he is a lifelong Suns fan as well as being a foundation member of the club when it entered the AFL in 2011. He played a starring role in Palm Beach Currumbin State High School's 2023 AFL Queensland State Championship win and was voted best on ground in the Grand Final.

In June 2021, at 15 years of age, Graham became the youngest player to ever debut for the Palm Beach Currumbin Lions senior QAFL team. In 2023, he was a member of the historic first Allies team to win the U18 National Championship in 2023 and moved in first round draft contention with an impressive performance in the 2023 AFL Draft Combine, which included top three finishes in the 20m sprint, the standing vertical leap as well as the running vertical leap. He would be drafted to his hometown team the Gold Coast Suns with pick 26 in the 2023 AFL draft after the club decided to match a bid from the Adelaide Crows.

== AFL career ==
Graham made his AFL debut for the Suns at 18 years of age in round 4 of the 2024 season against the Greater Western Sydney Giants in Mount Barker.

He received a Rising Star nomination after Round 16 of the 2024 season.

== Personal life ==
Graham's older brother, Jackson, died in August 2025. He was a surfer and also played football.

== Statistics ==
Updated to the end of round 22, 2026.

Legend
G	Goals	K	Kicks	D	Disposals	T	Tackles
B	Behinds	H	Handballs	M	Marks

Season	Team	No.	Games	Totals							Averages (per game)							Votes
Season	Team	No.	Games	G	B	K	H	D	M	T	G	B	K	H	D	M	T	Votes
2024	Gold Coast	26	17	8	3	91	127	218	31	81	0.5	0.2	5.4	7.5	12.8	1.8	4.8	0
2025	Gold Coast	26	8	10	5	46	38	84	17	32	1.3	0.6	5.8	4.8	10.5	2.1	4.0	0
2026	Gold Coast	26	12	5	4	59	71	130	32	39	0.4	0.3	4.9	5.9	10.8	2.7	3.3	0
Career			37	23	12	196	236	432	80	152	0.6	0.3	5.3	6.4	11.7	2.2	4.1	0
