= Jed Walter =

Australian rules footballer (born 2005)

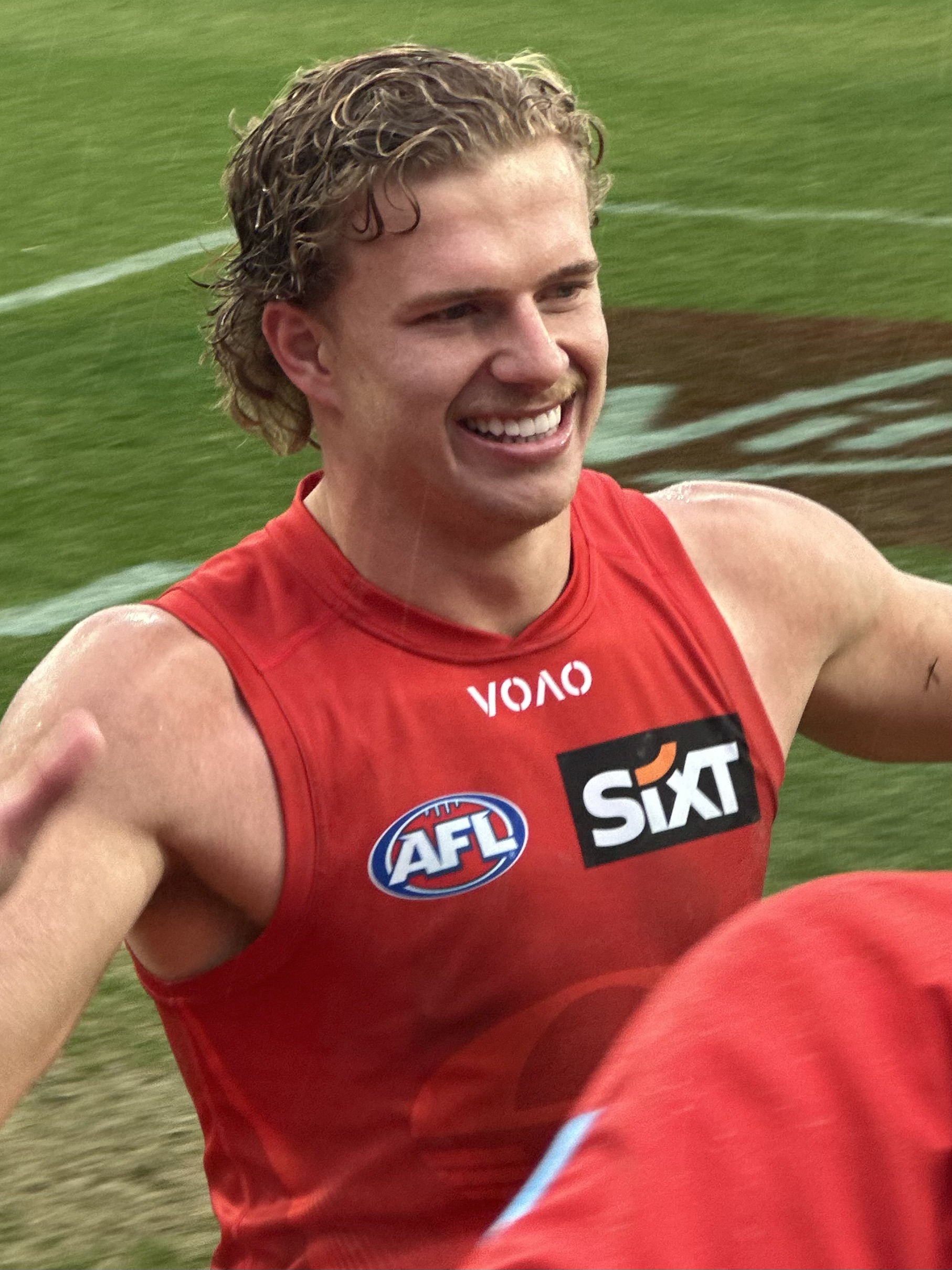
- Walter in August 2026

Personal information
- Full name: Jed Walter
- Nickname: Walt Disney
- Born: 8 June 2005 (age 21); South Perth, Western Australia
- Original team: Palm Beach Currumbin (QAFL) / Gold Coast Suns Academy (Talent League)
- Draft: No. 3, 2023 AFL draft
- Height: 195 cm (6 ft 5 in)
- Weight: 97 kg (214 lb)
- Position: Key Forward

Club information
- Current club: Gold Coast
- Number: 4

Playing career^{1}
Years	Club	Games (Goals)
2024–	Gold Coast	48 (62)
- ^{1} Playing statistics correct to the end of the 2026 season.

Jed Walter (born 8 June 2005) is a professional Australian rules footballer who plays for the Gold Coast Suns in the Australian Football League (AFL). He was selected with the third pick in the 2023 AFL draft.

== Early life ==
Walter was born in South Perth and spent the early years of his life in Western Australia before moving to the Gold Coast at nine years of age. He began playing junior football for the first time shortly after arriving in Queensland when he signed up to play under-9s for the Palm Beach Currumbin Lions alongside future Gold Coast Suns teammates Ethan Read and Will Graham. He grew up a West Coast Eagles supporter but has stated that he always had a soft spot for the Gold Coast Suns throughout his upbringing. He was educated at renowned sporting school Palm Beach Currumbin State High School and played a starring role in their 2022 AFL Queensland State Championship win.

Along with football, Walter also competed at the national level in short and long distance running, which included winning in the under-10 national 800m race, but eventually gave up running when football became more serious. He was invited to take part in the Gold Coast Suns Academy at 12 years of age and began gaining local prominence two months after his 13th birthday when he was awarded the Gold Coast Junior AFL U14s Player of the Year award in 2018. In 2019, he was selected to represent Queensland as a bottom ager at the U15 Australian Football Championships and his strong performances in that carnival earned him selection as the centre half-forward in the U15 All-Australian team.

In May 2021, Walter made his NAB League debut for the Gold Coast Academy at 15 years of age against the Dandenong Stingrays and faced future Suns teammate Mac Andrew. Six weeks later, he made his senior QAFL debut for Palm Beach Currumbin a month after his 16th birthday and kicked two goals in an impressive performance. In 2022, Walter was coached by newly arrived Palm Beach Currumbin teammate Liam Jones during his AFL hiatus in which he lived and played in southern Queensland.

Walter was selected to represent the Allies as a bottom ager in the 2022 U18 National Championships and put together several dominant performances that led to him being named as the starting U18 All-Australian centre half-forward at the conclusion of the tournament. He was considered a top draft prospect leading into the 2023 season and proved his worth by guiding the Allies to a historic first U18 National Championship win in which the team went undefeated and Walter was subsequently named as the starting U18 All-Australian centre half-forward for a second consecutive year.

== AFL career ==
Walter became the second Queensland product after Nick Riewoldt to be drafted with a top three draft selection when the Gold Coast Suns matched a pick three bid from North Melbourne in the 2023 AFL draft. In January 2024, after impressing many onlookers during his first AFL pre-season, Walter broke his collarbone and subsequently missed the early rounds of the 2024 AFL season. He made his AFL debut at 18 years of age in round 2 of the 2024 season against the Western Bulldogs in Ballarat.

== Statistics ==
Updated to the end of round 22, 2026.

Legend
G	Goals	K	Kicks	D	Disposals	T	Tackles
B	Behinds	H	Handballs	M	Marks

Season	Team	No.	Games	Totals							Averages (per game)							Votes
Season	Team	No.	Games	G	B	K	H	D	M	T	G	B	K	H	D	M	T	Votes
2024	Gold Coast	17	14	11	14	54	26	80	25	31	0.8	1.0	3.9	1.9	5.7	1.8	2.2	0
2025	Gold Coast	4	16	18	13	63	51	114	39	24	1.1	0.8	3.9	3.2	7.1	2.4	1.5	0
2026	Gold Coast	4	16	29	13	85	47	132	52	16	1.8	0.8	5.3	2.9	8.3	3.3	1.0	0
Career			46	58	40	202	124	326	116	71	1.3	0.9	4.4	2.7	7.1	2.5	1.5	0
