= 2018 NEAFL season =

Australian rules football season

- Teams: 10
- Premiers: Southport; 1st premiership
- Minor premiers: Southport; 1st minor premiership

The 2018 NEAFL season was the eighth season of the North East Australian Football League (NEAFL). The season began on 7 April and concluded on 16 September 2018.

The grand final was won by Southport, who defeated the Sydney Swans reserves by 55 points.

== Ladder ==
| Pos | Team | Pld | W | L | D | PF | PA | PP | Pts | Qualification |
|---|---|---|---|---|---|---|---|---|---|---|
| 1 | Southport | 18 | 12 | 6 | 0 | 1803 | 1243 | 145.1 | 48 | Qualification to Finals |
| 2 | Sydney | 18 | 12 | 6 | 0 | 1458 | 1061 | 137.4 | 48 | Qualification to Finals |
| 3 | Sydney University | 18 | 12 | 6 | 0 | 1563 | 1399 | 111.7 | 48 | Qualification to Finals |
| 4 | Aspley | 18 | 12 | 6 | 0 | 1463 | 1328 | 110.2 | 48 | Qualification to Finals |
| 5 | Brisbane | 18 | 10 | 7 | 1 | 1676 | 1176 | 142.5 | 42 | Qualification to Finals |
| 6 | Canberra Demons | 18 | 10 | 8 | 0 | 1548 | 1479 | 104.7 | 40 | Qualification to Finals |
| 7 | GWS Giants | 18 | 8 | 9 | 1 | 1442 | 1557 | 92.6 | 34 | |
| 8 | Gold Coast | 18 | 7 | 11 | 0 | 1079 | 1518 | 71.1 | 28 | |
| 9 | NT Thunder | 18 | 5 | 13 | 0 | 1342 | 1918 | 70.0 | 20 | |
| 10 | Redland | 18 | 1 | 17 | 0 | 1269 | 1964 | 64.6 | 4 | |

Source: Australian Football
Rules for classification: 1) points; 2) percentage; 3) number of points for.

== Finals ==
=== Elimination Finals ===
| | Elimination Finals |
| Saturday 1 September (12:00 pm) | Sydney University 14.10 (94) | def. by | Canberra Demons 15.13 (103) | Blacktown ISP Oval | Scorecard |
| Saturday 1 September (1:30 pm) | Aspley 14.18 (102) | def. | Brisbane Lions 7.12 (54) | Graham Road Oval | Scorecard |

=== Preliminary Finals ===
| | Preliminary Finals |
| Saturday 8 September (11:30 am) | Sydney Swans 18.10 (118) | def. | Canberra Demons 8.14 (62) | Blacktown ISP Oval | Scorecard |
| Saturday 8 September (1:30 pm) | Southport 11.15 (81) | def. | Aspley 6.8 (44) | Fankhauser Reserve | Scorecard |

=== Grand Final ===
2018 NEAFL Grand Final
Sunday, 16 September (1:00pm) | Southport | def. | Sydney | Fankhauser Reserve
3.2 (20); 6.2 (38); 12.4 (76); 14.6 (90) | Q1; Q2; Q3; Final | 0.3 (3); 1.4 (10); 2.4 (16); 5.5 (35) | Umpires: B. Ritchie, N. McGinness, A. Adair; Andrew Ireland Medal: Ryan Davis (Southport)
T. Wilkinson 3, M. Johnson 3, D. Fyfe 2, R. Clements, C. Filewood, L. Dale, M. Manteit, W. Hancock, R. Davis | Goals | J. Dawson 3, J. Rose, C. O'Riordan
R. Davis, T. Roos, S. Tape, D. Fyfe, A. Boston, T. Wilkinson | Best | J. Rose, C. O'Riordan, J. Dawson, J. Bell, R. Stoddart
Injuries | J. Brown (concussion)
