= 2002 AFLQ State League season =

94th season of the AFL Queensland State League

- Date: 21 April − 22 September 2002
- Premiers: Mount Gravatt; 1st premiership
- Minor premiers: Southport
- Grogan Medallist: David Round (Southport)

The 2002 AFLQ State League season was the 94th season of the AFL Queensland State League (AFLQSL), the highest-level senior men's Australian rules football competition in Queensland. The season began on 21 April and concluded on 22 September.

Mount Gravatt won the AFLQSL premiership for the first time, defeating Southport by 61 points in the 2002 AFLQ State League Grand Final.

== Finals series ==
=== Grand Final ===
2002 AFLQ State League Grand Final
Sunday, 22 September	Mount Gravatt	def.	Southport	Giffin Park
6.1 (37); 10.4 (64); 17.8 (110); 20.11 (131)	Q1; Q2; Q3; Final	5.1 (31); 6.6 (42); 9.7 (61); 10.10 (70)
Goals	T. Crossley 3, J. Ryan 2, C. Richardson, J. Pate, J. Georgiades, S. McKeon, L. Ryswyk
Best	D. Round, M. Nguyen, K. Tandogac, J. Georgiades, J. Ryan, M. Wollington
Injuries	S. Coughlan (collarbone)
Reports	C. McGough (striking)
