= 2024 AFL Queensland season =

159th season of Australian rules football in Queensland

- Date: 6 April − 21 September 2024
- Highest score: M: 47.17 (299) (Thuringowa Bulldogs − AFL TSV)
- Lowest score: M: 0.0 (0) (Northern Beaches Suns − AFL TSV); W: 0.0 (0) (Northern Beaches Suns − AFL TSV)

The 2024 AFL Queensland season was the 159th season of Australian rules football in Queensland. Nine senior leagues – all governed by AFL Queensland (AFLQ) – held competitions, with the highest-level being the Queensland Australian Football League (QAFL) and the QAFL Women's (QAFLW).

Most AFLQ leagues operated with a single senior division (one for men and one for women), consisting of a home-and-away season and a finals series, along with lower-grade reserves and junior competitions. Only one competition, the Queensland Football Association (QFA), used a promotion and relegation system.

== QAFL ==
Morningside won the QAFL premiership for the 11th time, defeating Redland-Victoria Point by five points in the 2024 QAFL Grand Final.

Southport won the QAFLW premiership for the first time, defeating Bond University by 35 points in the 2024 QAFLW Grand Final at People First Stadium.

== Cairns ==
2024 AFL Cairns season
- Date: 13 April − 21 September 2024
- Teams: 7

Men's
- Premiers: South Cairns; 10th premiership
- Minor premiers: South Cairns

Women's
- Premiers: Cairns City; 1st premiership
- Minor premiers: Cairns City

Other premiers
- Development: South Cairns
- Division 3: Cairns

The 2024 AFL Cairns season was the 69th season of the AFL Cairns (AFLC) men's competition and the 15th season of the women's competition.

South Cairns won the men's premiership for the tenth time, defeating North Cairns by 32 points in the grand final. It was the club's first premiership since 2003.

The women's premiership was won by Cairns City for the first time.

=== Men's ===
==== Finals ====
2024 AFL Cairns Men's Grand Final
Saturday, 21 September (5:00pm)	South Cairns	def.	North Cairns	Cazalys Stadium
3.4 (22); 7.7 (49); 12.12 (84); 16.17 (113)	Q1; Q2; Q3; Final	5.3 (33); 7.6 (48); 10.8 (68); 12.9 (81)	Howard Kennedy Medal: Damien Hill (South Cairns)
D. Hill, J. Wardle, J. Cresswell, L. McCarthy, T. Fields, A. Rogers	Best	J. Bennett, F. Greenwool, R. Tarlinton, J. Tom

=== Women's ===
==== Finals ====
2024 AFL Cairns Women's Grand Final
Saturday, 21 September (12:15pm)	North Cairns	def. by	Cairns City	Cazalys Stadium
2.2 (14); 3.3 (21); 4.4 (28); 4.6 (30)	Q1; Q2; Q3; Final	2.0 (12); 6.5 (41); 7.7 (49); 10.13 (73)
Best	A. Davies-Scherer, J. Baird, D. Creed-Wray, D. Chilman, I. Turner

== Capricornia ==
2024 AFL Capricornia season
- Date: 13 April − 31 August 2024
- Teams: 6

Men's
- Premiers: Yeppoon
- Minor premiers: Yeppoon

Women's
- Premiers: Rockhampton
- Minor premiers: Rockhampton

Other premiers
- Reserves: Yeppoon

The 2024 AFL Capricornia season was the 56th season of the AFL Capricornia (AFLC) men's competition and the 15th season of the women's competition.

Yeppoon won the men's premiership, while Rockhampton won the women's premiership.

The existing pre-finals bye for the AFL Capricornia youth competitions was removed, with the junior grand finals played one week before the senior grand finals.

=== Men's ===
==== Finals ====
2024 AFL Capricornia Men's Grand Final
Saturday, 31 August (3:50pm)	Yeppoon	def.	Glenmore	Stenlake Park
4.5 (29); 7.9 (51); 10.13 (73); 16.16 (112)	Q1; Q2; Q3; Final	0.0 (0); 0.0 (0); 2.1 (13); 4.2 (26)

=== Women's ===
==== Finals ====
2024 AFL Capricornia Men's Grand Final
Saturday, 31 August (2:00pm)	Rockhampton	def.	Yeppoon	Stenlake Park
1.0 (6); 3.0 (18); 3.0 (18); 6.1 (37)	Q1; Q2; Q3; Final	0.0 (0); 1.0 (6); 2.1 (13); 3.1 (19)

== Darling Downs ==
2024 AFL Darling Downs season
- Date: 20 April − 31 August 2024
- Teams: 7

Men's
- Premiers: Coolaroo; 12th premiership
- Minor premiers: Coolaroo

Women's
- Premiers: Toowoomba; 9th premiership
- Minor premiers: Toowoomba

The 2024 AFL Darling Downs season was the 54th season of the AFL Darling Downs (AFLDD) men's competition and the 12th season of the women's competition.

=== Men's ===
==== Finals ====
2024 AFL Darling Downs Men's Grand Final
Saturday, 31 August (2:30pm)	Coolaroo	def.	Goondiwindi	Rockville Park
17.9 (111)	Q1; Q2; Q3; Final	3.6 (24)

=== Women's ===
==== Finals ====
2024 AFL Darling Downs Women's Grand Final
Saturday, 31 August (12:30pm)	Toowoomba	def.	University	Rockville Park
1.3 (9); 5.4 (34); 6.5 (41); 9.6 (60)	Q1; Q2; Q3; Final	0.0 (0); 0.0 (0); 0.4 (4); 0.4 (4)

== Mackay ==
2024 AFL Mackay season
- Date: 20 April − 7 September 2024
- Teams: 7

Men's
- Premiers: Eastern Swans; 7th premiership
- Minor premiers: Eastern Swans
- MJ Miller Medallist: Chris Endres (Eastern Swans)

Women's
- Premiers: Bakers Creek
- Minor premiers: North Mackay

Other premiers
- Reserves: Bakers Creek

The 2024 AFL Mackay season was the 55th season of the AFL Mackay (AFLM) men's competition and the latest season of the women's competition.

Following the introduction of Gather Round in the AFL for the 2023 season, round 1 of the AFL Mackay season saw eight games across three competitions (men's senior, men's reserves and women's) played at Harrup Park.

=== Men's ===
==== Finals ====
2024 AFL Mackay Men's Grand Final
Saturday, 7 September (3:40pm)	Eastern Swans	def.	North Mackay	Etwell Park
2.1 (13); 5.2 (32); 7.3 (45); 8.5 (53)	Q1; Q2; Q3; Final	0.3 (3); 2.3 (15); 2.6 (18); 2.7 (19)	Best on ground: Chris Endres (Eastern Swans)

=== Women's ===
==== Finals ====
2024 AFL Mackay Women's Grand Final
Saturday, 7 September (1:40pm)	North Mackay	def. by	Bakers Creek	Etwell Park
2.1 (13); 2.4 (16); 2.4 (16); 2.4 (16)	Q1; Q2; Q3; Final	0.0 (0); 0.0 (0); 1.2 (8); 3.2 (20)
Best	T. Saunders, I. Brough, B. Rowlands, B. Adams, E. Rix, R. Heisrath

== Mount Isa ==
2024 AFL Mount Isa season
- Date: 27 April − 14 September 2024
- Teams: 4
- Premiers: Mount Isa Buffaloes
- Minor premiers: Mount Isa Buffaloes
- Cargill Medallist: Nick Burton (Mount Isa Buffaloes); Benji Lynch (Mount Isa Buffaloes)

The 2024 AFL Mount Isa season was the 58th season of the AFL Mount Isa (AFLMI) competition.

The premiership was won by the Mount Isa Buffaloes after defeating the Mount Isa Tigers by 12 points in the grand final. Scores were tied at the final siren, and as the extra time rules were unclear, a coin toss was conducted – the Tigers wanted two five-minute terms, while the Buffaloes wanted two ten-minute terms. The Buffaloes won the coin toss, and ultimately won the match at the end of extra time.

Although AFLMI had hoped to start an official women's league in 2024, no such competition took place. Instead, informal women's matches took place throughout the year, with teams selected on the day. One of these matches was played as a curtain raiser to the grand final.

=== Ladder ===
Pos	Team	Pld	W	WF	L	D	PF	PA	PP	Pts	Qualification
1	Mount Isa Buffaloes (P)	13	9	3	1	0	1120	479	233.8	48	Qualifying final
2	Lake Nash	13	7	0	5	1	816	1002	81.4	30	Qualifying final
3	Mount Isa Tigers	13	3	1	8	1	609	809	75.3	18	Elimination final
4	Dajarra Rhinos	13	1	1	11	0	467	722	64.7	8	Elimination final

Rules for classification: 1) points; 2) percentage; 3) number of points for.
(P) Premiers; (W) Club withdrew

=== Finals ===
2024 AFL Mount Isa Grand Final
Saturday, 14 September (12:30pm)	Mount Isa Buffaloes	def.	Mount Isa Tigers	Legend Oval
2.2 (14); 4.4 (28); 8.6 (54); 9.6 (60); 12.8 (80)	Q1; Q2; Q3; Q4; Final	2.1 (13); 5.5 (35); 6.5 (41); 9.6 (60); 10.8 (68)	Best on ground: Josh Robinson (Mount Isa Buffaloes)
At the end of the first extra time period, the Buffaloes led 11.7 (73) to the Tigers' 9.7 (61). The second and final extra time period saw the Buffaloes win 12.8 (80) to 10.8 (68).

== Townsville ==
2024 AFL Townsville season
- Date: 6 April − 7 September 2024
- Teams: 5

Men's
- Premiers: Thuringowa Bulldogs; 14th premiership
- Minor premiers: Thuringowa Bulldogs

Women's
- Premiers: Hermit Park; 5th premiership
- Minor premiers: Hermit Park

Other premiers
- Reserves: Thuringowa Bulldogs

The 2024 AFL Townsville season was the 70th season of the AFL Townsville (AFLT) men's competition and the 10th season of the women's competition.

The Thuringowa Bulldogs won the men's premiership for the 14th time, while Hermit Park won the women's premiership for the fifth time and the second year in a row.

In round 9 of the men's season, the Northern Beaches Suns had a 299-point loss to the Thuringowa Bulldogs, failing to score for the entire match. 47.17 (299) and 0.0 (0) were the highest and lowest scores in the competition (and in senior AFLQ competitions) respectively for the 2024 season, and it was the biggest loss in the Suns' history. Following the loss, Ross Henningsen resigned as senior coach and was replaced by Gary Kelly.

=== Men's ===
==== Ladder ====
Pos	Team	Pld	W	L	D	PF	PA	PP	Pts	Qualification
1	Thuringowa Bulldogs (P)	16	15	1	0	1667	420	396.9	60	Finals series
2	Curra Swans	16	11	5	0	1207	815	148.1	44	Finals series
3	Hermit Park	16	9	7	0	1102	692	159.3	36	Finals series
4	University Hawks	16	5	11	0	855	939	91.1	20	Finals series
5	Northern Beaches Suns	16	0	16	0	210	2175	9.7	0	

Rules for classification: 1) points; 2) percentage; 3) number of points for.
(P) Premiers; (W) Club withdrew

==== Finals ====
2024 AFL Townsville Men's Grand Final
Saturday, 7 September (3:15pm)	Thuringowa Bulldogs	def.	Curra Swans	Riverway Stadium
0.3 (3); 1.3 (9); 6.3 (39); 9.6 (60)	Q1; Q2; Q3; Final	0.3 (3); 4.4 (28); 4.4 (28); 4.4 (28)	Ricco Butler Medal: Joel Newman (Thuringowa Bulldogs)
B. Wilson, J. Newman, N. Searle, J. Dwyer, S. Guest	Best	S. Nicholson, D. Chivas, C. Dudman, M. Dennis, S. Maher

=== Women's ===
==== Ladder ====
Pos	Team	Pld	W	L	D	PF	PA	PP	Pts	Qualification
1	Hermit Park (P)	16	13	3	0	812	207	392.3	52	Finals series
2	Curra Swans	16	12	4	0	566	296	191.2	48	Finals series
3	Thuringowa Bulldogs	16	6	10	0	253	730	34.7	24	Finals series
4	University Hawks	16	4	12	0	241	414	58.2	16	Finals series
5	Northern Beaches Suns	16	5	11	0	214	339	48.8	16 (Note: The Northern Beaches Suns were deducted 4 points.)	

Rules for classification: 1) points; 2) percentage; 3) number of points for.
(P) Premiers; (W) Club withdrew

==== Finals ====
2024 AFL Townsville Women's Grand Final
Saturday, 7 September (1:15pm)	Hermit Park	def.	Curra Swans	Riverway Stadium
0.0 (0); 1.3 (9); 4.5 (29); 4.6 (30)	Q1; Q2; Q3; Final	2.3 (15); 2.3 (15); 2.4 (16); 2.5 (17)	Best on ground: Maggie Evans (Hermit Park)
M. Evans, K. Williams, H. Cornish, B. Wilson, E. Farrands, A. McGrath	Best	E. Bibby, B. Wyke, M. Magnuson, K. McNamara, M. Abson

== Wide Bay ==
2024 AFL Wide Bay season
- Date: 6 April − 1 September 2024
- Teams: 5

Men's
- Premiers: Hervey Bay; 19th premiership
- Minor premiers: Hervey Bay

Women's
- Premiers: ATW Eagles
- Minor premiers: ATW Eagles

Other premiers
- Reserves: Maryborough
- Juniors (boys): U17: Hervey Bay
- Juniors (mixed): U14: Hervey Bay; U12: Brothers Bulldogs

The 2024 AFL Wide Bay season was the 36th season of the AFL Wide Bay (AFLWB) men's competition and the seventh season of the women's competition.

=== Men's ===
==== Finals ====
2024 AFL Wide Bay Men's Grand Final
Saturday, 31 August	Hervey Bay	def.	Bay Power	Keith Dunne Oval
1.0 (6); 2.4 (16); 3.6 (24); 5.8 (38)	Q1; Q2; Q3; Final	1.4 (10); 1.5 (11); 1.9 (15); 2.11 (23)

=== Women's ===
==== Finals ====
2024 AFL Wide Bay Women's Grand Final
Saturday, 31 August	ATW Eagles	def.	Bay Power	Keith Dunne Oval
4.3 (27); 6.4 (40); 6.4 (40)	Q1; Q2; Q3; Final	0.0 (0); 0.0 (0); 1.1 (7)

== Schools Cup ==
2024 AFLQ Schools Cup
- Date: ended 13 October 2024
- Teams: 745

The 2024 AFLQ Schools Cup was the ninth season of the AFL Queensland Schools Cup, a knockout tournament contested by schools across Queensland and the Northern Rivers region of New South Wales. It included three age-based divisions – primary (grades 4–6), junior (grades 7–9) and senior (grades 10–12) – for both male and female players. A record 745 teams and 16,269 players participated.

For a second straight year, Palm Beach Currumbin State High School won all four secondary school titles, while St Vincent's Primary School and Marymount Primary School claimed the primary male and female titles respectively. All four players named best-on-ground in the secondary school grand finals were members of the Gold Coast Suns Academy.
