= 2018 NEAFL Grand Final =

Australian rules football match

Southport	Sydney
14.6 (90)	5.5 (35)
	1	2	3	4
SOU	3.2 (20)	6.2 (38)	12.4 (76)	14.6 (90)
SYD	0.3 (3)	1.4 (10)	2.4 (16)	5.5 (35)
- Date: 16 September 2018
- Ground: Fankhauser Reserve
- Umpires: B. Ritchie, N. McGinness, A. Adair
- Coin toss won by: Southport
- Kicked toward: Musgrave Avenue End

Accolades
- Andrew Ireland Medallist: Ryan Davis (Southport)

Broadcast in Australia
- Network: NEAFL TV
- Television: NITV (replay)
- Commentators: Michael Price, Mark Kennedy, Bob Batty

The 2018 NEAFL Grand Final was an Australian rules football match contested between the Southport Sharks and the Sydney Swans at Fankhauser Reserve on 16 September 2018. It was the eighth grand final of the North East Australian Football League (NEAFL), held to determine the premiers of the 2018 NEAFL season.

Southport won the match by 55 points, claiming its first NEAFL premiership and twenty-second senior men's premiership. It was Sydney's fifth NEAFL runners-up result and its final grand final appearance before the league was disbanded in 2020.

The match ended in controversial fashion after Southport was found to have had nineteen men on the field early in the fourth quarter. Although it could have resulted in Southport's score being reset to zero, it was ultimately treated as a routine interchange infringement and the score up until the point of the breach remained.

== Background ==
Sydney lost the 2017 NEAFL Grand Final to Brisbane by three points. The result was considered a surprise, as the Swans had finished first on the ladder with a percentage of 233.1% and won its preliminary final against Gold Coast by 68 points.

Southport recorded its worst NEAFL position in 2017 after finishing ninth out of ten clubs, with head coach Nathan Bock resigning and being replaced by Steve Daniel at the end of the year. The club's playing list underwent significant changes to include twenty-five new players for the 2018 season, while Andrew Boston and Seb Tape were named as the club's new co-captains.

=== 2018 season ===
Southport claimed the minor premiership at the end of the 2018 home-and-away season ahead of Sydney, Sydney University and Aspley on percentage. Sydney were second on the ladder despite losing their first four matches of the season.

In the preliminary finals held on 8 September 2018, Sydney defeated Canberra by 56 points at Blacktown ISP Oval, while Southport defeated Aspley by 37 points at Fankhauser Reserve.

Leading into the grand final, Sydney had won every match they had played against Southport, including earlier in the 2018 season, when the Swans won by 78 points in round 7.

== Match summary ==
Southport's Cody Filewood kicked the first goal after 16 seconds of play. The Sharks had an 18-point lead at quarter time, with the Swans unable to kick a goal until Jordan Dawson scored in the fourth minute of the second quarter. Southport led by 28 points at half-time.

In the third quarter, Southport kicked six goals and doubled its score, while Sydney only managed to kick one goal. At three-quarter-time, Southport led by 60 points.

Twenty seconds into the final quarter, Sydney captain Colin O'Riordan requested a head count from the umpire to determine if Southport had an nineteenth man on the field. After the head count, it was determined that Josh Baxter (who ironically wore guernsey number 19) was the extra player, because of an error on the Sharks' interchange bench when resuming play for the final quarter.

In addition to a free kick, the Laws of the Game allowed for Southport's entire score to that point – 12.4 (76) – to be reset to zero, but did not necessarily require it, with the decision to be made by NEAFL officials.

The final quarter continued to be played onfield amid the uncertainty, while the NEAFL officials debated the rules. It was not until the 28th minute that officials confirmed Southport's score would not be cancelled, concluding that the breach was immaterial to the game and should be treated as a routine interchange infringement, rather than the full "too many men on the ground" infraction.

Sydney kicked 3.1 (19) to Southport's 2.2 (14) in the final quarter, but the Sharks ultimately won the match by 55 points. Ryan Davis won the Andrew Ireland Medal for best on ground, having recorded 29 disposals and 19 marks.

=== Scorecard ===
2018 NEAFL Grand Final
Sunday, 16 September (1:00pm)	Southport	def.	Sydney	Fankhauser Reserve
3.2 (20); 6.2 (38); 12.4 (76); 14.6 (90)	Q1; Q2; Q3; Final	0.3 (3); 1.4 (10); 2.4 (16); 5.5 (35)	Umpires: B. Ritchie, N. McGinness, A. Adair; Andrew Ireland Medal: Ryan Davis (Southport)
T. Wilkinson 3, M. Johnson 3, D. Fyfe 2, R. Clements, C. Filewood, L. Dale, M. Manteit, W. Hancock, R. Davis	Goals	J. Dawson 3, J. Rose, C. O'Riordan
R. Davis, T. Roos, S. Tape, D. Fyfe, A. Boston, T. Wilkinson	Best	J. Rose, C. O'Riordan, J. Dawson, J. Bell, R. Stoddart
Injuries	J. Brown (concussion)

== Teams ==
Teams for the grand final were announced on 14 September 2018. Southport had one change, with Brenton Payne replacing Tom Ellard because of injury, while Sydney brought in Jordan Dawson, Jeremy Shumack and Josh Rayner to replace Robbie Fox, Harrison Marsh and Gary Rohan, who were all unable to play under NEAFL rules relating to finals eligibility.

Southport
B:	45. Ethan Reeves	14. Brodie Murdoch	12. Rhys Clark
HB:	15. Jordan Taylor	7. Ryan Davis	8. Seb Tape (c)
C:	34. Tyler Roos	5. Andrew Boston (c)	32. Tom Wilkinson
HF:	4. Michael Manteit	19. Josh Baxter	33. Matt Doran
F:	46. Josh Hall	17. Mitch Johnson	21. Wade Hancock
Foll:	23. Jed Turner	10. Josh Clayton	28. Rob Clements
Int:	16. Lee Dale	27. Jack O'Shea	6. Dylan Fyfe
Int:	3. Brenton Payne	26. Cody Filewood	
Coach:	Steve Daniel		
Emg:	39. Anthony Djurovitch	43. Jaicob Kenny	31. Brandon Chadwick

Sydney
B:	51. Conor Flanagan	48. Kyle Veerhuis	53. Kyle McKellar
HB:	33. Ryley Stoddart	21. Jack Maibaum	56. Joey Reinhard
C:	52. Josh Stern	45. Angus Styles	1. James Rose
HF:	41. Jake Brown	34. Jordan Dawson	50. Sam Wicks
F:	55. Bailey Stewart	58. Mitchell Rogers	49. Cooper Kilpatrick
Foll:	17. Darcy Cameron	32. James Bell	38. Colin O'Riordan (c)
Int:	60. Hamish Ellem	47. Ky McGrath	59. Josh Rayner
Int:	54. Jeremy Schumack		
Coach:	Tadhg Kennelly		
Emg:	57. Michael Carroll	19. Luke Parks	46. Dylan Smith

== Aftermath ==
In a statement released following the match, the NEAFL said the interchange breach had been "reported to the match manager" and "both clubs were informed that an outcome of the breach would be determined as soon as practically possible", acknowledging that "the ruling and decision occurred during an important time of the game".

A similar interchange breach took place on the same day during the South Australian National Football League (SANFL) preliminary final between Woodville-West Torrens and North Adelaide. In this instance, North Adelaide played almost four minutes of the final quarter with nineteen men on the field, but no head count was staged (as it required a team captain to request one from the on-field umpire). Woodville-West Torrens lodged an official protest two days later, but the result stood, and North Adelaide went onto win the grand final.

The national Laws of the Game were amended the following season, shifting the rules from cancelling the team's entire score to just cancelling the score for that quarter in which the infraction occurs. A formal provision for a league to review and impose a penalty (including reversal of the match result) for a breach, including if it was identified post-match, was also introduced.

Southport's 55-point victory was its biggest winning margin in a NEAFL finals match.

== See also ==
- List of NEAFL premiers
