= Georja Davies =

Australian rules footballer (born 2007)

- Davies in November 2026

Personal information
- Born: 17 January 2007 (age 19); Wales
- Original team: Southport (QAFLW)
- Draft: No. 9, 2025 national draft
- Debut: Round 1, 2026, Gold Coast vs. Western Bulldogs, at People First Stadium
- Height: 184 cm (6 ft 0 in)
- Position: Defender

Club information
- Current club: Gold Coast
- Number: 4

Playing career^{1}
Years	Club	Games (Goals)
2026–	Gold Coast	1 (0)
- ^{1} Playing statistics correct to the end of round 1, 2026.

Career highlights
- Rising Star nominee: 2026; 2x QAFLW premiership player: 2024, 2025

Georja Davies (pron. /ˈdeɪvəs/, "Davis"; born 17 January 2007) is an Australian rules footballer who plays for the Gold Coast Suns in the AFL Women's (AFLW).

== Early life ==
Davies was born in Wales and grew up on the Gold Coast where she attended Southport State High School throughout her upbringing. She began her junior career as an under-13s player at the Southport Sharks in 2017. In her first five seasons at Southport, she played 68 matches.

In 2023, Davies made her senior QAFL Women's (QAFLW) debut at 16 years of age, kicking four goals in her first match against Wilston Grange. She was a member of Southport's inaugural QAFLW senior premiership team in 2024, kicking one goal in the grand final against Bond University. Davies continued playing for Southport in 2025, where she was a member of the premiership-winning team against Morningside.

== AFL career ==
Davies was selected by Gold Coast with pick 9 in the AFLW draft held on 15 December 2025. She was one of ten Gold Coast players to make their AFLW debut in round 1 of the 2026 season against the Western Bulldogs at People First Stadium.

== Personal life ==
Davies is of Welsh descent and grew up on the Gold Coast. Her three sisters – Darcie, Fleur and Giselle – also play in the AFLW for Gold Coast, Greater Western Sydney and Sydney respectively.
