= 2024 QAFL season =

113th season of the Queensland Australian Football League

- Date: 6 April − 15 September 2024
- Teams: 12
- Premiers: Morningside; 11th premiership
- Minor premiers: Aspley
- Grogan Medallist: Tom Hickey (Palm Beach Currumbin − 26 votes)
- Ray Hughson Medallist: Matthew Hammelmann (Redland-Victoria Point − 71 goals)

The 2024 QAFL season was the 113th season of the Queensland Australian Football League (QAFL), the highest-level senior men's Australian rules football competition in Queensland. The season began on 6 April and concluded on 15 September, comprising an 18-match home-and-away season over 19 rounds, followed by a four-week finals series.

Morningside won the QAFL premiership for the 11th time, defeating Redland-Victoria Point by five points in the 2024 QAFL Grand Final.

== Ladder ==
| Pos | Team | Pld | W | L | D | PF | PA | PP | Pts | Qualification |
|---|---|---|---|---|---|---|---|---|---|---|
| 1 | Aspley | 18 | 15 | 3 | 0 | 1861 | 1118 | 166.5 | 60 | Finals series |
| 2 | Morningside (P) | 18 | 14 | 4 | 0 | 1985 | 1316 | 150.8 | 56 | Finals series |
| 3 | Redland-Victoria Point | 18 | 12 | 6 | 0 | 1859 | 1295 | 143.6 | 48 | Finals series |
| 4 | Wilston Grange | 18 | 11 | 7 | 0 | 1845 | 1348 | 136.9 | 44 | Finals series |
| 5 | Palm Beach Currumbin | 18 | 11 | 7 | 0 | 1701 | 1544 | 110.2 | 44 | Finals series |
| 6 | Surfers Paradise | 18 | 10 | 8 | 0 | 1553 | 1292 | 120.2 | 40 | Finals series |
| 7 | Maroochydore | 18 | 9 | 9 | 0 | 1507 | 1448 | 104.1 | 36 | |
| 8 | Labrador | 18 | 8 | 10 | 0 | 1697 | 1420 | 119.5 | 32 | |
| 9 | Broadbeach | 18 | 8 | 10 | 0 | 1463 | 1586 | 92.2 | 32 | |
| 10 | Sherwood Districts | 18 | 7 | 11 | 0 | 1484 | 1619 | 91.7 | 28 | |
| 11 | Noosa | 18 | 3 | 15 | 0 | 1306 | 1869 | 69.9 | 12 | |
| 12 | Mount Gravatt | 18 | 0 | 18 | 0 | 663 | 3069 | 21.6 | 0 | |

Rules for classification: 1) points; 2) percentage; 3) number of points for.
(P) Premiers

== Finals series ==
=== Grand Final ===
2024 QAFL Grand Final
Sunday, 15 September (2:30pm) | Morningside | def. | Redland-Victoria Point | Brighton Homes Arena
2.2 (14); 6.5 (41); 8.8 (56); 9.12 (66) | Q1; Q2; Q3; Final | 1.4 (10); 3.11 (20); 4.12 (36); 8.13 (61) | Joe Grant Medal: Tommy Horne (Morningside)
J. Godwin 3, J. Lohmann 2, M. Waters 2, T. Horne, G. McDonagh | Goals | C. Cameron 2, M. Hammelmann 2, D. Annable, J. Brown, D. McDowell-White, M. Thomson
T. Horne, G. McDonagh, D. Swann, J. Lohmann, J. Godwin, M. Nelson | Best | L. O'Sullivan, D. Annable, N. Smith, D. McDowell-White, T. Hausfeld, H. Hunkin

== Awards ==
- Tom Hickey (Palm Beach Currumbin) won the Grogan Medal as the QAFL's best and fairest player, finishing with 26 votes.
- Matthew Hammelmann (Redland-Victoria Point) won the Ray Hughson Medal as the leading goalkicker for the second year in a row, finishing the season with 71 goals.
- Ty Gallop (Maroochydore) won the Rising Star award.
- Tom Hickey (Palm Beach Currumbin) won the Coaches MVP (Most Valuable Player) award.

== Notable events ==
- On 15 December 2023, AFL Queensland announced they had granted a provisional licence for the Coorparoo Football Club to enter the QAFL in 2025. An official licence to enter the QAFL men's competition was granted on 31 July 2024.

== See also ==
- 2024 QAFLW season
- 2024 AFL Queensland season
