= Southport Football Club =

Southport Football Club may refer to:

- Southport Australian Football Club (Southport Sharks), Australian rules football club in Queensland
- Southport F.C., from Southport, England
