= Chris O'Sullivan =

Chris O'Sullivan may refer to:

- Chris O'Sullivan (ice hockey) (born 1974), American ice hockey player
- Chris O'Sullivan (rugby league) (born 1959), Australian rugby league player
- Chris O'Sullivan (footballer) (born 1968), Australian rules footballer
