= Darcie Davies =

Australian rules footballer (born 2005)

Personal information
- Born: 14 June 2005 (age 21); Wales
- Original team: Southport (QAFLW)
- Debut: Round 1, 2023, Gold Coast vs. Carlton, at Ikon Park
- Height: 184 cm (6 ft 0 in)
- Position: Ruck

Club information
- Current club: Gold Coast
- Number: 3

Playing career^{1}
Years	Club	Games (Goals)
2023–	Gold Coast	10 (3)
- ^{1} Playing statistics correct to the end of the 2023 season.

Darcie Davies (pron. /ˈdeɪvəs/, "Davis"; born 14 June 2005) is an Australian rules footballer playing for Gold Coast in the AFL Women's (AFLW).

== Early life ==
Davies was born in Wales and moved with her family to Australia's Gold Coast at a young age. She played junior Australian rules football for the Southport Sharks and attended Southport State High School throughout her upbringing. Her father Darren was a junior international rugby union player for Wales and her sisters Georja, Giselle and Fleur also play in the AFLW.

== AFLW career ==
Davies was drafted by her hometown team the Gold Coast Suns as an injury replacement in the 2023 AFL Women's supplementary draft. She made her debut in round 1 of the 2023 AFL Women's season.
