= Wayde Mills =

Australian rules footballer

Personal information
- Full name: Wayde Mills
- Born: 29 August 1987 (age 39)
- Original team: Southport (QLD)
- Draft: 25th overall, 2005; Brisbane Lions
- Height: 195 cm (6 ft 5 in)
- Weight: 93 kg (205 lb)
- Positions: Full-back, Half-back

Playing career^{1}
Years	Club	Games (Goals)
2006–2008	Brisbane Lions	16 (3)
- ^{1} Playing statistics correct to the end of 2008.

Career highlights
- Queensland U18 side; Grogan Medal: 2017

Wayde Mills (born 29 August 1987) is an Australian rules footballer in the South Australian National Football League, and formerly in the Australian Football League.

== Overview ==
Mills played junior football with the Coolangatta Tweed Heads Australian Football Club before playing senior football with the Southport Sharks.

He was recruited as the number 25 draft pick in the 2005 AFL draft from Southport. He made his debut for the Brisbane Lions in Round 2, 2006 against Essendon.

Mills was expected to be developed as the Lions' Centre Half-Back to fill the void created by the retirement of Justin Leppitsch. In the 2007 AFL season, he was used initially in a half forward flank role, but then became increasingly a defensive forward who put pressure on opposition defenders to force them to make mistakes. He kicked two goals against Kangaroos on 4 August 2007.

Wayde Mills was delisted by the Brisbane Lions at the end of the 2008 season.

At the end of the 2008 season Wayde Mills was signed by the Glenelg Football Club in the SANFL, he made his debut in Round 1, 2009 and he has become a consistent Full-back.
