= Steven McLuckie =

Australian rules footballer

Personal information
- Full name: Steven McLuckie
- Born: 12 February 1973 (age 53)
- Original team: Southport (QAFL)
- Height: 174 cm (5 ft 9 in)
- Weight: 72 kg (159 lb)

Playing career^{1}
| Years | Club | Games (Goals) |
| 1992–1993 | Brisbane Bears | 20 (8) |
- ^{1} Playing statistics correct to the end of 1993.

Steven McLuckie (born 12 February 1973) is a former Australian rules footballer who played with the Brisbane Bears in the Australian Football League (AFL).

From Surfers Paradise, McLuckie played with AFL Queensland State League club Southport until his recruitment by Brisbane as a zone selection at the 1990 AFL draft.

McLuckie was Brisbane's leading goal-kicker and disposal getter with four goals and 25 disposals in his debut in 1993 against Collingwood at Victoria Park. He averaged 19 disposals from 13 appearances that year and was also a wingman in the Brisbane reserves premiership team.

McLuckie made the combined Queensland-Northern Territory State of Origin squad in 1993 but only played seven games for Brisbane and was delisted at the end of the season. After spending 1995 with West Adelaide in the South Australian National Football League (SANFL), he returned to Southport, for which he won a Joe Grant Medal in 2000, as the best player in the AFL Queensland State League grand final.

In 2015 McLuckie was appointed Executive Principal of the Gold Coast-based Varsity College. Prior to this, McLuckie held the position of Principal at Southport State High School for a number of years.
