= Brayden Crossley =

Australian rules footballer (born 1999)

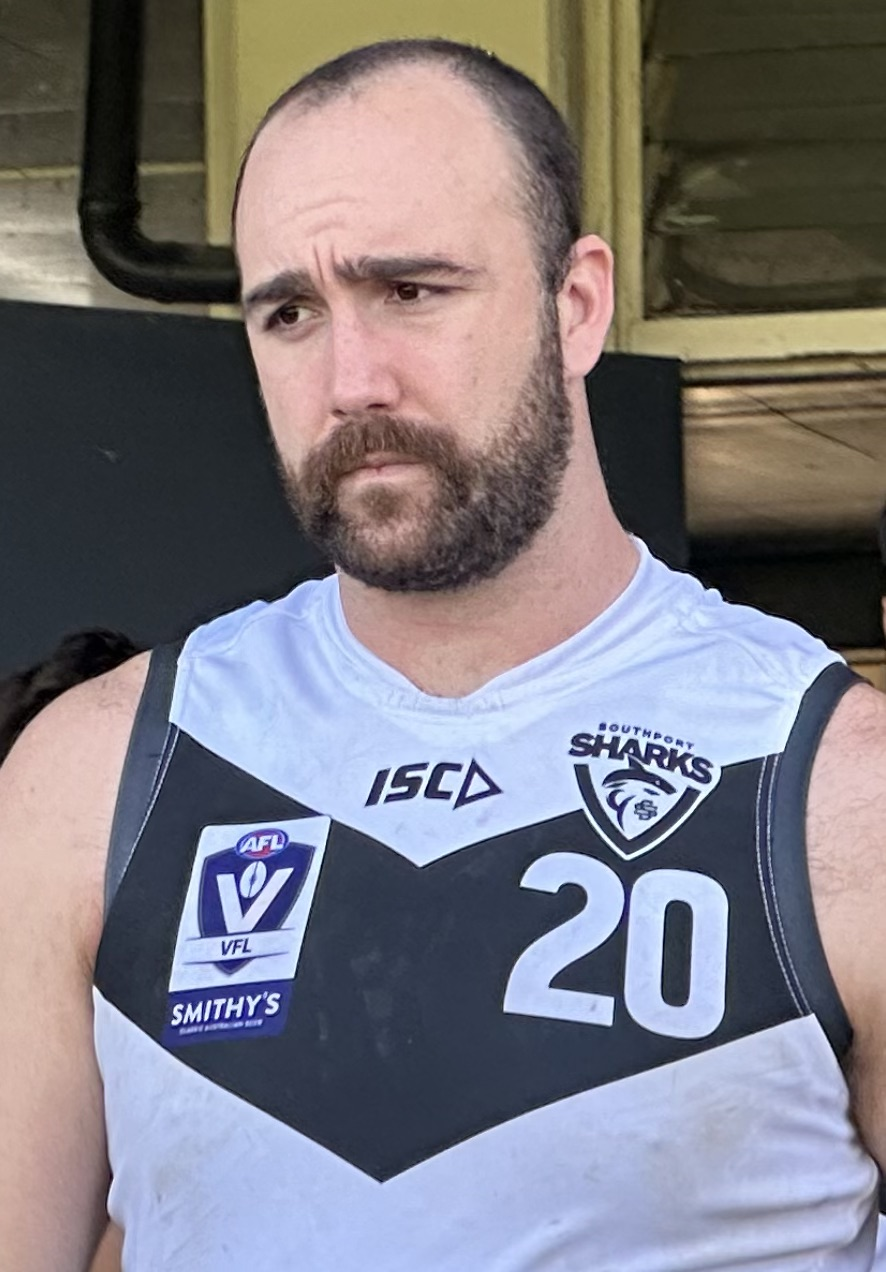
- Crossley playing for Southport in 2026

Personal information
- Full name: Brayden Crossley
- Nickname: Goober
- Born: 16 August 1999 (age 27); Gold Coast, Queensland
- Original teams: Palm Beach Currumbin (QAFL); Burleigh Bombers (QFA)
- Draft: No. 52, 2017 national draft
- Height: 198 cm (6 ft 6 in)
- Weight: 102 kg (225 lb)
- Position: Key forward / ruckman

Club information
- Current club: Southport
- Number: 20

Playing career^{1}
Years	Club	Games (Goals)
2018–2019	Gold Coast	10 (5)
- ^{1} Playing statistics correct to the end of 2019.

Brayden Crossley (born 16 August 1999) is an Australian rules footballer and the current co-captain of the Southport Sharks in the Victorian Football League (VFL), serving alongside Jacob Dawson. He previously played for the Gold Coast Suns in the Australian Football League (AFL).

== Early life ==
Crossley was born and raised on the Gold Coast. His father, Troy, is a Southport Sharks dual premiership player and Hall of Fame inductee. Brayden grew up playing his junior football for the Burleigh Bombers before switching to Palm Beach Currumbin in the latter stages of his junior football. He attended Palm Beach Currumbin High School throughout his youth and joined Gold Coast Suns Academy in his teenage years. In October 2016, Crossley played a starring role for his high school when he led them to victory in the Queensland Schools Cup grand final and was subsequently named best on ground for his three-goal performance.

In his final year of junior football, Crossley was selected to represent the Gold Coast in the Academy Series and the Allies in the 2017 AFL Under 18 Championships. He was subsequently named the Allies' MVP and the All-Australian ruckman. In November 2017, he was drafted by the Gold Coast Football Club with pick 52 in the 2017 AFL draft.

== Career ==
Crossley made his AFL debut in round 7 of the 2018 AFL season against the Western Bulldogs. He kicked a goal on debut and recorded thirteen disposals, seven hit outs and five tackles.

On 25 May 2019, Crossley tested positive to cocaine by ASADA on a match day ahead of a NEAFL game between Gold Coast Suns and the Sydney Swans, in which he played in and kicked two goals.

On 8 August 2019, the news broke and Crossley faced a ban of up to four years under the Australian Football Anti-Doping Code.

Crossley played for Southport in the club's six-point 2024 VFL grand final loss to Werribee.
