= Cameron O'Brien =

Australian rules footballer (born 1966)

Personal information
- Full name: Cameron O'Brien
- Born: 28 September 1966 (age 60)
- Original team: St Kilda Thirds
- Height: 190 cm (6 ft 3 in)
- Weight: 96 kg (212 lb)
- Position: Forward

Playing career^{1}
Years	Club	Games (Goals)
1985	Collingwood	1 (0)
1987–1991	Brisbane Bears	44 (65)
Total		45 (65)
- ^{1} Playing statistics correct to the end of 1991.

Cameron O'Brien (born 28 September 1966) is a former Australian rules footballer who played with Collingwood and the Brisbane Bears in the Victorian Football League (VFL).

An Old Xaverian, O'Brien played for St Kilda's thirds and Under-19s sides before joining Collingwood. His father, Jim O'Brien, was a former St Kilda footballer.

In the final round of the 1985 VFL season, O'Brien played his first and only game for Collingwood, against Carlton at Waverley Park. The following year he represented Victoria at the Amateur football carnival in Adelaide and kicked eight goals in the final to win the Hugh Millard Medal.

O'Brien joined Brisbane in 1987 and after a couple of quiet seasons kicked 19 goals from eight appearances in 1989. This included a five-goal haul in a four-point win over St Kilda, which he won for his team with a soccered goal from 30 metres out late in the final quarter.

He played just five times in 1990 but had a memorable game against the Sydney Swans at Carrara when he kicked a career best seven goals. A year later, in what would be his final season, O'Brien made 12 appearances and kicked 26 goals. His tally was the equal third most by a Bear for the year and included six goals against Fitzroy.
