= Norm Dare =

Australian rules footballer and coach (born 1948)

Personal information
- Full name: Norman Bernard Dare
- Born: 10 September 1948 (age 78)
- Original team: Macleod-Rosanna
- Height: 183 cm (6 ft 0 in)
- Weight: 73 kg (161 lb)
- Position: Wing

Playing career
Years	Club	Games (Goals)
1968–74	Fitzroy	69 (23)
1975–76	West Torrens	15 (22)
1977	Fitzroy	2 (0)

Coaching career
Years	Club	Games (W–L–D)
1980–1981	Kedron	
1982–1988	Southport	
1990	Brisbane Bears	22 (4–18–0)
2004–2005	Southport	
2011–2013	Southport	

Career highlights
- Queensland Team of the Century: coach; QAFL premierships (all as coach); Kedron: 1980; Southport: 1983, 1985, 1987, 2005

Norman Bernard Dare (born 10 September 1948) is a former Australian rules football coach and player, most notable for coaching five premierships in the Queensland Australian Football League (QAFL).

== Playing career ==
Dare initially played league football for Fitzroy in the Victorian Football League (VFL), where he played 70 games between 1968 and 1974. He moved to West Torrens in the South Australian National Football League (SANFL) in 1975, most notable for his actions in the Round 15, 1975, match against West Adelaide, when Dare managed to jump the fence and hide amongst the crowd to prevent Torrens from being penalised in a head count. He returned to Fitzroy in 1977, and played only two more senior games before retiring from playing.

== Coaching career ==
=== Early career ===
Following the end of his playing career, Dare remained at Fitzroy and served two seasons as reserves coach. In 1980 he moved to Queensland, and coached the Kedron Football Club to a QAFL premiership in 1980. In 1982, he moved to Southport. He coached there from 1982–1988, and was the club's inaugural QAFL coach when it moved to the state's top league from the Gold Coast Australian Football League in 1983. Dare won three QAFL premierships with Southport during that time, in 1983, 1985 and 1987.

=== Brisbane Bears ===
In 1989, Dare moved to the Brisbane Bears in the VFL/AFL as an assistant coach, and then as senior coach in 1990, when he replaced Brisbane Bears caretaker senior coach Paul Feltham, who replaced Peter Knights, when Knights was sacked midway through the 1989 season. but both seasons resulted in wooden spoons, which ended Dare's coaching career with the Bears, when he stepped down as Brisbane Bears senior coach. Dare was then replaced by Robert Walls as Brisbane Bears senior coach. He however continued to serve in an administrative role with the club during the early 1990s.

=== Other coaching roles ===
While active as a coach during this time, Dare also regularly coached Queensland in interstate football. In the 1990s, Dare left Queensland to serve in assistant coaching roles at North Melbourne (1996 to 2000), then Geelong (2001 to 2003). He returned for a second two-year stint at Southport in 2004, winning another premiership with the club in 2005, after which he stepped aside. In 2011, he returned to coach Southport (now in the North East Australian Football League) for a third time, where he was senior coach for a further three years.

== Honours ==
In 2003, Dare was named as the coach of Queensland's official 'Team of the Century'.
