= Jacob Dawson =

Australian rules footballer (born 1999)

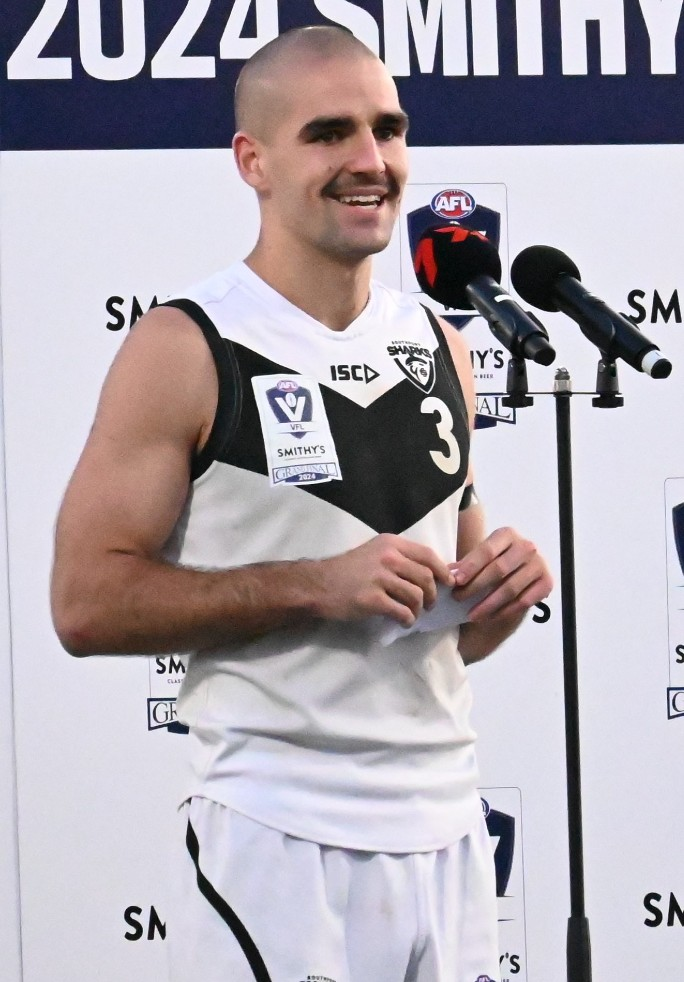
- Dawson with Southport in 2024

Personal information
- Full name: Jacob Dawson
- Born: 3 November 1999 (age 27)
- Original teams: Palm Beach Currumbin (QAFL); Burleigh Bombers (QFA)
- Height: 182 cm (6 ft 0 in)
- Weight: 79 kg (174 lb)
- Position: Midfielder

Club information
- Current club: Southport
- Number: 3

Playing career^{1}
Years	Club	Games (Goals)
2018–2019	Gold Coast	9 (1)
- ^{1} Playing statistics correct to the end of 2019.

Jacob Dawson (born 3 November 1999) is an Australian rules footballer and the current co-captain of the Southport Sharks in the Victorian Football League (VFL), serving alongside Brayden Crossley. He previously played for the Gold Coast Suns in the Australian Football League (AFL).

== Early life ==
Dawson was raised on the Gold Coast and grew up playing his junior football for the Burleigh Bombers. His father, Paul, played professional basketball in the National Basketball League. Jacob attended Palm Beach Currumbin High School throughout his youth and was placed in the Gold Coast Suns Academy at 13 years of age. He switched to the Palm Beach Currumbin Football Club at 17 years old and was chosen to represent the Gold Coast in the Academy Series and the Allies in the 2017 AFL Under 18 Championships. Dawson also played in Palm Beach Currumbin's 2017 QAFL senior premiership winning team.

In November 2017, he was picked with a rookie selection by the Gold Coast Football Club at the AFL draft.

== Career ==
Dawson made his AFL debut in round 14 of the 2018 AFL season against Hawthorn. Dawson was delisted at the end of the 2020 season.

Dawson played for Southport in the club's six-point 2024 VFL grand final loss to Werribee. The following year as Southport co-captain, he won the J. J. Liston Trophy as league best and fairest.
