= David Crutchfield =

Australian rules footballer

Personal information
- Full name: David Crutchfield
- Born: 2 August 1965
- Died: 29 November 2002 (aged 37)
- Original team: South Warrnambool
- Height: 191 cm (6 ft 3 in)
- Weight: 92 kg (203 lb)

Playing career^{1}
Years	Club	Games (Goals)
1985	Fitzroy	4 (0)
- ^{1} Playing statistics correct to the end of 1985.

David Crutchfield (2 August 1965 – 29 November 2002) was an Australian rules footballer who played with Fitzroy in the Victorian Football League (VFL).

== Career ==
Recruited from South Warrnambool, Crutchfield played in the final four rounds of the 1985 VFL season. His most productive game was against Geelong, when he had 17 disposals. He didn't make any further appearances and ended up in Queensland playing for Southport. In 1992 he was involved in a three-way tie for the Grogan Medal.

Crutchfield was later a successful player coach in South Australia's Riverland Football League. He steered Loxton North to four premierships in a row, from 1997 to 2000.

== Personal life ==
Crutchfield suffered from depression and committed suicide in 2002 at the age of 37.

His elder brother, Michael Crutchfield, is the member for South Barwon in the Victorian Legislative Assembly.
