= David Bain (Australian footballer) =

Australian rules footballer

Personal information
- Full name: David Lester Bain
- Born: 2 May 1966 (age 60); Albany, Western Australia
- Original teams: Maylands, East Perth Football club
- Draft: No. 16, 1988 national draft
- Height: 176 cm (5 ft 9 in)
- Weight: 67 kg (148 lb)
- Position: rover

Playing career^{1}
Years	Club	Games (Goals)
1985–1988	East Perth	71 (40)
1989–1993	Brisbane Bears	86 (44)
1994	Fitzroy	12 (4)
Total		169 (88)
- ^{1} Playing statistics correct to the end of 1994.

Career highlights
- F. D. Book Medal 1988; Sandover Medal 1988; Brisbane Bears Club Champion 1990; Gardiner Medal 1994; Grogan Medal 1995, 1999; Southport premiership side 1997, 1998, 1999, 2000

David Lester Bain (born 2 May 1966) is a retired Australian rules footballer who played for the Brisbane Bears and Fitzroy in the Australian Football League (AFL). Bain started his career in the WAFL with East Perth Football Club playing 72 games with them from 1985 to 1988 and kicking 41 goals. He was their best and fairest winner in 1988 and also won that year's Sandover Medal.

In 1989 he left Western Australia and joined the Brisbane Bears. Bain was the joint winner of Brisbane's best and fairest in 1990 with Martin Leslie. He also finished equal fourth in the Brownlow Medal count. In 1994 he crossed to Fitzroy and spent a season with the club, winning the Gardiner Medal for the best player in the reserves competition.

The third part of his career was spent in the QAFL where he had a successful stint as captain of the Southport Sharks, leading them to four premierships and winning two Grogan Medals. In 2023 he was inducted into the Queensland Football Hall of Fame.
