= Darren Carlson =

Australian rules footballer

Personal information
- Full name: Darren Graham Carlson
- Born: 6 May 1967 (age 59)
- Original team: Southport (QAFL)
- Height: 180 cm (5 ft 11 in)
- Weight: 77 kg (170 lb)
- Position: Wingman

Playing career^{1}
Years	Club	Games (Goals)
	Southport	64
1987–1990	Brisbane Bears	25 (7)
1991–1996	West Adelaide	105
- ^{1} Playing statistics correct to the end of 1996.

Darren Graham Carlson (born 6 May 1967) is a former Australian rules footballer who played with the Brisbane Bears in the Victorian/Australian Football League (VFL/AFL).

Carlson played his junior football in Surfers Paradise and then participated in three QAFL premierships with Southport, in 1985, 1986 and 1987. In the last of those years he also made his first VFL appearances for Brisbane in their inaugural league season, playing every game from round 11. He averaged 19 disposals a game that year and was "best on ground" against North Melbourne at Carrara Oval, with three Brownlow Medal votes. The following year he represented Queensland in the 1988 Adelaide Bicentennial Carnival.

Leg injuries restricted his progress and he could only add a further 14 games over the next three seasons.

A wingman, Carlson went to South Australian National Football League (SANFL) club West Adelaide in 1991 and was named in "The Advertiser Team of the Year".
