= Zane Taylor (footballer) =

Australian rules footballer

Personal information
- Full name: Zane Taylor
- Born: 28 February 1957 (age 69)
- Original team: Southport
- Height: 185 cm (6 ft 1 in)
- Weight: 80 kg (176 lb)

Playing career^{1}
Years	Club	Games (Goals)
1980–1983	Geelong	27 (12)
- ^{1} Playing statistics correct to the end of 1983.

Zane Taylor (born 28 February 1957) is a former Australian rules footballer who played with Geelong in the Victorian Football League (VFL) during the early 1980s. He spent time as a forward and midfielder during his career but it was as a half back flanker that he made the official "Queensland Team of the Century" in 2003.

His 26 interstate appearance for Queensland is a record and the medal given to the best player for the state in interstate matches is now named after him.

== Early life and QAFL ==
Taylor grew up in a Housing Commission estate in Footscray, Victoria a suburb of Melbourne. He played junior football with the Footscray Football Club colts where he was one of the team's star players. Moving to the Gold Coast, Queensland as a teenager, he began playing with QAFL Southport Sharks the age of 17 where he would star at Southport. In 1977, after two straight premierships with the Sharks, 19 year old Taylor was poached by his former club Footscray who made an offer to Taylor to play in the VFL. Taylor however turned it down, renewing his contract with Southport for another 3 years. At the end of his contract, following multiple Best and Fairests awards with Southport, he was once again approached by VFL clubs, this time signing with the Geelong Football Club.

== VFL Career ==
He had only just turned 23 when he started out at Geelong during the 1980 VFL season. He was suspended after his debut, for two games, having been found guilty of striking South Melbourne's Michael Wright with a clenched first. The suspension was costly as he was out of the seniors for seven weeks but when he returned he became a regular member of the team for the rest of the season. He played just six games in 1981 but appeared in a preliminary final, his second in two years.

== QAFL, Southport and VFL reserves ==
Taylor returned to Southport during the 1983 VFL season and finished equal first in voting for the Grogan Medal, but was ineligible due to suspension. He however won the award in 1985 and would go on to captain Southport to three premierships.

He enjoyed considerable team success over the course of his career, playing in 16 grand finals in a 16-year period from 1975 to 1990. The sequence started with four premierships at Southport, while they were in the Gold Coast league. He then played in three successive premierships with the Geelong reserves team from 1980 to 1982, contributing six goals to their 1981 grand final win. In the 1984 season, Southport didn't make the grand final, but Taylor had played in two grand finals in 1978, after getting a permit to appear for Windsor-Zillmere in the QAFL premiership decider. A grand final every year from 1985 to 1990, of which Southport lost twice, meant that he averaged a grand final a year during that period.
