= Daryl Bourke =

Australian rules footballer

Personal information
- Full name: Daryl Bourke
- Born: 7 April 1965 (age 61)
- Original team: Kyabram
- Height: 179 cm (5 ft 10 in)
- Weight: 77 kg (170 lb)

Playing career^{1}
Years	Club	Games (Goals)
1985–1986	Melbourne	18 (0)
- ^{1} Playing statistics correct to the end of 1986.

Daryl Bourke (born 7 April 1965) is a former Australian rules footballer who played with Melbourne in the Victorian Football League (VFL) during the 1980s.

A centreman, Bourke played nine games in each of his two seasons at Melbourne. He then joined the Brisbane Bears for their inaugural VFL season in 1987 but couldn't break into the team. Instead he became a leading player in the Queensland Australian Football League, with Morningside.

He had a knee reconstruction in 1988, his first year as captain, but played some of the best football of his career a year later to win the Grogan Medal. In 1991 he captained Morningside to a premiership and participated in two further premierships in 1993 and 1994. He gave up the captaincy in 1993 to become assistant playing coach and won another Grogan Medal that year, in a three-way tie, to become the first Morningside player to win it twice. When he finally retired as a player he had amassed 187 QAFL games, with eight top two finishes in his club's "Best and Fairest", including three wins. He also represented Queensland on ten occasions.
