= Grogan Medal =

Australian rules football award

The J.A. Grogan Medal, commonly known as the Grogan Medal, is an Australian rules football award given to the best and fairest player in home and away rounds of each season's QAFL/Queensland State League competition. The medal was first awarded in 1946. From 2011 to 2013 it was awarded to the best and fairest player in the North East Australian Football League Northern Conference. The F.W. De Little Medal was the precursor to the Grogan Medal, being awarded from 1927 to 1941. De Little Medal winners are included in the list below.

== Winners ==
Year	Player	Club
2025	Levi Casboult	Palm Beach Currumbin
2024	Tom Hickey	Palm Beach Currumbin
2023	Kwaby Boakye	Broadbeach
2022	Ryan Banks-Smith	Aspley
2021	Jordan Moncrieff	Broadbeach
2020	Matthew Payne	Morningside
2019	Frazer Neate	Mount Gravatt
2018	Blake Erickson	Broadbeach
2017	Jason Burge; Wayde Mills	Palm Beach Currumbin; Labrador
2016	Jesse Derrick	Palm Beach Currumbin
2015	Callum Carseldine	Western Magpies
2014	Ryan Davey	Labrador
2013	Haydn Kiel	Southport
2012	Ryan Davey; Fraser Pope; Tom Salter	Labrador; Southport; Redland
2011	Cameron Ilett; Matthew Payne	NT Thunder; Southport
2010	Danny Wise	Southport
2009	Nathan Gilliland	Mount Gravatt
2008	Nathan Kinch	Morningside
2007	Todd Featherstone	Labrador
2006	Matthew Payne	Zillmere Eagles
2005	David Round	Broadbeach
2004	Mick Stinear	Mount Gravatt
2003	Jacob Gough	Morningside
2002	David Round	Southport
2001	Paul O'Brien	Redland
2000	Danny Dickfos	Northern Eagles
1999	David Bain; Brad Jones	Southport; Mount Gravatt
1998	Dean Edwards	Morningside
1997	Jeff Brennan	Southport
1996	Corey Lambert	West Brisbane
1995	David Bain	Southport
1994	Mitch Howe	Morningside
1993	Daryl Bourke; Jason Cotter; Dean Warren	Morningside; Southport; Kedron Grange
1992	Ricky Chapman; David Crutchfield; Chris O'Sullivan	Morningside; Southport; Southport
1991	Cameron Buchanan	North Brisbane
1990	Jason Cotter	Southport
1989	Daryl Bourke	Morningside
1988	Craig Brittain	Windsor-Zillmere
1987	Terry Simmonds	Mayne
1986	Brendan McMullen; Greg Packham	Coorparoo; Kedron
1985	Zane Taylor	Southport
1984	Brendan McMullen	Coorparoo
1983	Peter Guy; Bill Peirce	Southport; Sherwood
1982	John Blair	Morningside
1981	Greg Hollick	Mayne
1980	Barry Karklis	Windsor-Zillmere
1979	Don Smith	Sandgate
1978	Peter Ives	Mayne
1977	Peter Taylor	Western Districts
1976	Barry Clarke	Wilston Grange
1975	Owen Backwell	Western Districts
1974	Jeff Ebert	Morningside
1973	Don Smith	Sandgate
1972	Barry Clarke	Wilston Grange
1971	Owen Backwell	Western Districts
1970	Kelvin Mills	Kedron
1969	Ken Garcia; Terry Johnston; Terry Weller	Wilston Grange; Morningside; Windsor-Zillmere
1968	Merv Appleyard	Wilston Grange
1967	Robin Hull	Windsor-Zillmere
1966	Gary Wah Hing	Kedron
1965	Tom Gould	Kedron
1964	Ken Grimley	Coorparoo
1963	Tom Gould	Kedron
1962	Keith Leach	Wilston Grange
1961	Keith Leach	Wilston Grange
1960	Jim Conlan; Merv Dihm	Wilston Grange; Morningside
1959	John Golding	Coorparoo
1958	Andy Stewart	Western Districts
1957	Keith Farnsworth	Morningside
1956	Tom Pelly	Western Districts
1955	Henry Maguire	Morningside
1954	Noel McGuinness	Morningside
1953	Noel McGuinness	Morningside
1952	Bevis Howell	Coorparoo
1951	Bill Shorten	Yeronga
1950	Tom Calder; Edgar Stevens	Coorparoo; Sandgate
1949	Dick Parton	Windsor
1948	Tom Calder	Coorparoo
1947	Doug Pittard; Fred Willets	Western Districts; Yeronga
1946	Doug Pittard	Western Districts
1942– 1945	No award
1941	Tom Neilson	Past State Commercial High School
1940	Doug Pittard	Taringa
1939	C.K. (Pat) Vidgen	Taringa
1938	Jim Davies	Windsor
1937	Charlie Stream	Windsor
1936	Bill Nunn	Taringa
1935	Jim Davies	Windsor
1934	Jim Davies; Len Gregory	Windsor; Valley
1933	Fred Walker	Valley
1932	Charlie Stream	Windsor
1931	Clem Ryan	Mayne
1930	H. ‘Nugget’ Green	Windsor
1929	Bill Becker	South Brisbane
1928	Bill Becker	South Brisbane
1927	Neil Brown	Windsor
