= Chris O'Sullivan (footballer) =

Australian rules footballer

Personal information
- Full name: Chris O'Sullivan
- Born: 22 April 1968 (age 58)
- Original team: Cora Lynn
- Draft: No. 72, 1988 national draft
- Height: 172 cm (5 ft 8 in)
- Weight: 69 kg (152 lb)

Playing career^{1}
Years	Club	Games (Goals)
1989–1990	Brisbane Bears	8 (2)
- ^{1} Playing statistics correct to the end of 1990.

Chris O'Sullivan (born 22 April 1968) is a former Australian rules footballer who played with the Brisbane Bears in the Victorian/Australian Football League (VFL/AFL).

O'Sullivan, a Victorian, was selected by Brisbane with the 72nd pick of the 1988 VFL Draft. He played eight games in 1989 but could only manage two more in 1990. His efforts with QAFL club Southport in 1992 were good enough to win him a Grogan Medal, in a three-way tie. He now works as a brand manager.
