= Jim O'Brien (Australian footballer) =

Australian rules footballer

Personal information
- Full name: Jim O'Brien
- Born: 2 August 1936
- Died: 23 January 1996 (aged 59)
- Original team: Old Xaverians
- Height: 177 cm (5 ft 10 in)
- Weight: 71 kg (157 lb)
- Position: Rover

Playing career^{1}
Years	Club	Games (Goals)
1957–63	St Kilda	75 (75)
- ^{1} Playing statistics correct to the end of 1963.

Jim O'Brien (2 August 1936 – 23 January 1996) was a former Australian rules footballer who played with St Kilda in the Victorian Football League (VFL).
