= David Round =

Australian rules footballer

Personal information
- Full name: David Round
- Born: 25 June 1978 (age 48)
- Original team: Strathmore/Calder Cannons
- Draft: Father–son selection, 1995 AFL draft
- Height: 192 cm (6 ft 4 in)
- Weight: 90 kg (198 lb)

Playing career
Years	Club	Games (Goals)
1997	Western Bulldogs	2 (0)
1998	North Melbourne	0 (0)
1999–2001	Williamstown	48
2002–2003	Southport	
2005–2008	Broadbeach	

Career highlights
- Grogan Medal: 2002, 2005

David Round (born 25 June 1978) is a former Australian rules footballer who played with the Western Bulldogs in the Australian Football League (AFL).

Round, the son of former Brownlow Medal winner Barry, was drafted by the Western Bulldogs under the father–son rule as a speculative pick. He was recruited from the Calder Cannons and before that played at Strathmore. A ruckman, he was aged 18 when he made his AFL debut in round three of the 1997 AFL season, against Richmond at the MCG. He could only manage one kick but kept his spot in the side for the following week's fixture against Melbourne. Round again struggled to have an impact, with just two hit-outs and a solitary kick.

Having been delisted at the end of the season, Round was rookie listed by North Melbourne. However, he did not play a senior game and ended up at Victorian Football League (VFL) club Williamstown, another of his father's former clubs. In 1999 he won Williamstown's "best and fairest" award but by 2001 was spending a lot of time in the reserves. He performed so well in the 2001 VFL reserves competition that he took home the Todd Medal, as the league's best player.

In 2002 he moved to Queensland to join Southport and was a Grogan Medal winner in his first season. He won another Grogan Medal in 2005, this time while at Broadbeach.
