= AFL Townsville =

Amateur Australian rules football competition in Townsville

AFL Townsville is an amateur competition formed as the Townsville Australian Football League in 1955, the first contemporary AFL competition to be formed outside of the South East Queensland. It is based in the city of Townsville. For a short period in the 1980s, the competition was played during the summer months. The representative team is known as the Eagles and they wear similar guernseys to the Zillmere Eagles' old white and blue guernseys. AFL Townsville runs a men's competition with seniors and reserves divisions, as well as a women's and junior competitions.

== History ==
=== Early matches in Townsville ===
A Townsville representative team travelled to Cairns in 1884 to play one of the earliest recorded matches in Far North Queensland. It is not known how long the Townsville team began playing prior to this.

Australian Football is recorded to have been played regularly in Townsville in 1886.

The game was short-lived in Far North Queensland as shortly following the folding of the governing body, the Queensland Football Association Rugby Union grew rapidly in popularity across the north of the state with new clubs being formed in areas where the QFA clubs has been and players switching codes.

During World War I in 1942 and 1943, several matches were played among service teams. A league briefly existed including teams RAAF, Cavalry, Army and Essential Services. However support soon petered out.

=== Townsville Australian Football League ===
The current league was launched with three teams, RAAF, Hermit Park and South Townsville in 1954, after a series of exhibition matches were played at RAAF Oval and Gill Park and an exhibition game at the Townsville Showgrounds. All clubs were founded with juniors.

The Garbutt club was formed in 1956. In 1961, Currajong replaced the RAAF who withdrew due to a struggle for numbers. Australia's involvement in the Vietnam War led to the Army entering the scene in 1968 when 6 RAR and a revived RAAF side expanded the league to 6 teams.

The Wulguru club was established in 1968 and entered senior sides, bringing the league up to seven teams. As Australia's involvement in Vietnam wound down, the Army withdrew. The competition remained with six sides from 1976 to 1982 until a team from Burdekin increased the numbers to seven in 1983. Burdekin, made up of converted rugby players, had almost no support apart from the management of the Delta Hotel. The demise of Wulguru followed in early 1984 when the league made a decision with significant consequences. Four seasons of summer football followed, and while the “Darwin” seasons attracted some top players, junior development was stifled.

Currajong in 1990 swallowed up a penniless Townsville Swans, who had switched from South Townsville in June 1982 to become the Curra Swans. The nomination of the Hawks club in 1989 caused a stir due to the number of current players recruited from Hermit Park, Currajong and South Townsville using suspect overtures, although be that as it may the club were premiers by a point in their first season.

The league lost three teams in 1989 and the following year only Hermit Park, West Townsville, Curra Swans, and the University Hawks remained.

In 1999, the Northern Beaches Lions entered the TAFL in an attempt to expand the shattered league. Unfortunately, they endured season after season of enormous defeats. In one match that year, Steve Mazey of West Townsville kicked 27 goals against them. The Northern Beaches Lions were renamed to the Twin City Lions in 2002 and continued to struggle until the end of 2008 when they went into recess with only one win to their credit in August 2004 over Curra Swans. The Lions regrouped and returned with much more solid foundations in 2012 under the banner of "Townsville City Lions". Despite losing every match that year, often at record margins, the determined Lions upgraded their Garbutt facility and won their second Senior match in June 2013 by a goal against University.

Despite the lack of growth in the Seniors, AFL Townsville enjoyed a massive surge in the Junior ranks in more recent years, numbers had increased, and now hundreds of children and teenagers turn out to give their all for their respective clubs.

In 2010, the Thuringowa Bulldogs (former West Townsville) won their first Senior premiership since 2001 in their 40th year and went on to go back to back in 2011.

== Clubs ==
=== Current ===
Locations of the AFL Townsville clubs. Yellow = junior only.

| Club | Colours | Nickname | Home Ground(s) | Est. | Years in TAFL | TAFL Senior Premierships | |
| Club | Colours | Nickname | Home Ground(s) | Est. | Years in TAFL | Total | Years |
|---|---|---|---|---|---|---|---|
| Curra | | Swans, Mud Ducks | Muldoon Oval ("The Pond"), Annandale | 1990 | 1990- | 4 | 1996, 1997, 1998, 2020 |
| Hermit Park | | Tigers | Neil French Oval, Annandale | 1955 | 1955- | 14 | 1955, 1967, 1970, 1984/85, 1986/87, 2002, 2006, 2008, 2012, 2015, 2017, 2018, 2019, 2021 |
| Northern Beaches | | Suns | North Shore Oval, Burdell | 2016 | 2016- | 0 | - |
| Thuringowa (West Townsville 1970-2001) | | Bulldogs | Riverway Stadium, Thuringowa Central | 1970 | 1970- | 16 | 1971, 1980, 1987/88, 1990, 1991, 1992, 1999, 2000, 2001, 2010, 2011, 2013, 2014, 2016, 2022, 2023, 2024, 2025, 2026 |
| University | | Hawks | Riverway Stadium, Thuringowa Central | 1989 | 1989- | 9 | 1989, 1993, 1994. 1995, 2003, 2004, 2005, 2007, 2009 |

=== Junior Only ===
| Club | Colours | Nickname | Home Ground(s) | Est. | Years in TAFL |
|---|---|---|---|---|---|
| Garbutt | | Bombers | Harold Phillips Park, Garbutt | 1955 | |
| Magnetic Island | | Magpies | Gifford Street, Horseshoe Bay Magnetic Island | | |

=== Previous ===
| Club | Colours | Nickname | Home Ground(s) | Est. | Years in TAFL | TAFL Senior Premierships | | Fate |
| Club | Colours | Nickname | Home Ground(s) | Est. | Years in TAFL | Total | Years | Fate |
|---|---|---|---|---|---|---|---|---|
| 2RAR (Second Royal Australian Regiment) | | | | 1969 | 1969 | 1 | 1969 | Merged with 4FR to form Lavarack in 1970 |
| 4FR (Fourth Field Regiment) | | | | 1969 | 1969 | 0 | - | Merged with 2RAR to form Lavarack in 1970 |
| 6RAR (Sixth Royal Australian Regiment) | | | | 1958 | 1968 | 0 | - | Folded after 1968 season |
| Burdekin | | Bulls | | 1983 | 1983 | 0 | - | Folded after 1983 season |
| Currajong | | Blues | Centenary Park, South Townsville | 1961 | 1961-1989 | 9 | 1973, 1975, 1976, 1977, 1978, 1979, 1983, 1984, 1985/86 | Merged with Townsville Swans to form Curra after 1989 season |
| Garbutt | | Magpies | Harold Phillips Park, Garbutt | 1956 | 1956-1988, 2021-2022 | 7 | 1958, 1961, 1962, 1964, 1965, 1966, 1982 | Recess between 1989 and 2020, folded after 2022 season |
| Lavarack | | | | 1970 | 1970, 1972 | 1 | 1972 | Recess in 1971 |
| Northern Beaches Barras | | Barras | North Shore Oval, Burdell | | ?-2015 | Juniors only | | Merged with Townsville City to form Northern Beaches Suns in 2016 |
| RAAF | | | Airfield Oval, Garbutt | 1954 | 1954-1960, 1968-1969 | 1 | 1956 | Recess between 1961-67, folded after 1969 season |
| Townsville Swans (South Townsville 1954-83) | | Swans | Muldoon Oval, Annandale | 1954 | 1954-1990 | 6 | 1957, 1959, 1960, 1963, 1968, 1974 | Merged with Currajong to form Curra after 1989 season |
| Townsville City (Northern Beaches 1999-2002; Twin Cities 2003-2008) | | Lions | North Shore Oval, Burdell | 1999 | 1999-2015 | 0 | - | Merged with Northern Beaches Barras to form Northern Beaches Suns in 2016 |
| Upper Ross | | Bombers | | 1973 | 1973-1976 | 0 | - | Folded after 1976 season |
| Wulguru | | Saints | Wulguru Oval, Wulguru | 1968 | 1968-1984 | 1 | 1981 | Folded after 1984 season |

== Premiers ==
- 1955 Hermit Park
- 1956 RAAF
- 1957 South Townsville
- 1958 Garbutt
- 1959 South Townsville
- 1960 South Townsville
- 1961 Garbutt
- 1962 Garbutt
- 1963 South Townsville
- 1964 Garbutt
- 1965 Garbutt
- 1966 Garbutt
- 1967 Hermit Park
- 1968 South Townsville
- 1969 2RAR
- 1970 Hermit Park
- 1971 West Townsville
- 1972 Lavarack
- 1973 Currajong
- 1974 South Townsville
- 1975 Currajong
- 1976 Currajong
- 1977 Currajong
- 1978 Currajong
- 1979 Currajong
- 1980 West Townsville
- 1981 Wulguru
- 1982 Garbutt
- 1983 Currajong
- 1984 Currajong
- 1984/85 Hermit Park
- 1985/86 Currajong
- 1986/87 Hermit Park
- 1987/88 West Townsville
- 1988 Townsville
- 1989 University Hawks
- 1990 West Townsville
- 1991 West Townsville
- 1992 West Townsville
- 1993 University Hawks
- 1994 University Hawks
- 1995 University Hawks
- 1996 Curra Swans
- 1997 Curra Swans
- 1998 Curra Swans
- 1999 West Townsville
- 2000 West Townsville
- 2001 West Townsville
- 2002 Hermit Park
- 2003 University Hawks
- 2004 University Hawks
- 2005 University Hawks
- 2006 Hermit Park
- 2007 University Hawks
- 2008 Hermit Park
- 2009 University Hawks
- 2010 Thuringowa
- 2011 Thuringowa
- 2012 Hermit Park
- 2013 Thuringowa
- 2014 Thuringowa
- 2015 Hermit Park
- 2016 Thuringowa
- 2017 Hermit Park
- 2018 Hermit Park
- 2019 Hermit Park
- 2020 Curra Swans
- 2021 Hermit Park
- 2022 Thuringowa
- 2023 Thuringowa
- 2024 Thuringowa
- 2025 Thuringowa

== W.J.Williams Medal (League Best & Fairest) ==
- 1955 W.Bene-Best – RAAF
- 1956 Lionel Hall – Garbutt
- 1957 J. Kennedy, R.Dillon – South Townsville, Garbutt
- 1958 Max Craig – South Townsville
- 1959 Steve Lampton – Garbutt
- 1960 James MacDonald – Garbutt
- 1961 Ricco Butler – Garbutt
- 1962 Eric Johns – Hermit Park
- 1963 Claude Morris – Currajong
- 1964 Ricco Butler – Garbutt
- 1965 Terry Gouki – South Townsville
- 1966 Chris Reynolds – Hermit Park
- 1967 Ricco Butler – Garbutt
- 1968 Jack Van Damme – Currajong
- 1969 Dave Christie – 2RAR
- 1970 Peter Cox – Currajong
- 1971 Bob Anderson – Hermit Park
- 1972 Ray McGrath – South Townsville
- 1973 Florio Da're – West Townsville
- 1974 Florio Da're – West Townsville
- 1975 John Bangle – West Townsville
- 1976 Keith Sedgman – West Townsville
- 1977 Graham Wilson – West Townsville
- 1978 Dave Nogar – Garbutt
- 1979 Paul Smith – Wulguru Saints
- 1980 Mark Fedley – South Townsville
- 1981 Paul Smith – Wulguru Saints
- 1982 Steve Lovell – Hermit Park
- 1983 Brett Franklin – Hermit Park
- 1984 Ken Johnson – Currajong
- 1984/85 Brian Hope – Townsville Swans
- 1985/86 Larry Howson – West Townsville
- 1986/87 Robert Scott – Townsville Swans
- 1987/88 Larry Howson – West Townsville

- 1988 Alan Chirgwin – Townsville Swans
- 1989 Hugh Bresser – James Cook University
- 1990 Garry Cook – West Townsville
- 1991 Andrew Cadzow – Heatley Hawks
- 1992 Brett Howson – West Townsville
- 1993 Steve Talbot – Hermit Park
- 1994 Peter Appleford – West Townsville
- 1995 Peter Pyle – Curra Swans
- 1996 Peter Appleford – West Townsville
- 1997 M. Jolly – Hermit Park
- 1998 Nigel Aikin – Hermit Park
- 1999 Peter Appleford – West Townsville
- 2000 Peter Appleford – West Townsville
- 2001 Corey Hewitt – Curra Swans
- 2002 Corey Hewitt – Curra Swans
- 2003 Stephen Montano – University Hawks
- 2004 Glenn Robertson – Thuringowa
- 2005 Steve Montano, Ben Broadbent – University Hawks
- 2006 Andrew Grubba – Hermit Park
- 2007 Steve Montano – University Hawks
- 2008 Michael Krake – Hermit Park
- 2009 Brent Doyle – Curra Swans
- 2010 Cameron Leman – Thuringowa
- 2011 Adam McDonald – Curra Swans
- 2012 Clint Austerberry – Thuringowa
- 2013 Cody Richardson – Thuringowa
- 2014 Jason Di Betta – Hermit Park
- 2015 Nathan Peters – Hermit Park
- 2016 Daine MacDonald – Thuringowa
- 2017 Daine MacDonald – Thuringowa
- 2018 Troy Sherratt/Daniel Broderick – University Hawks
- 2019 Shane Lindgren – Curra Swans
- 2020 Tyson Williams – Thuringowa
- 2021 Callaway Parker – Hermit Park
- 2022 Joel Newman – Thuringowa

== 2009 Ladder ==
| AFL Townsville | Wins | Byes | Losses | Draws | For | Against | % | Pts | Final | Team | G | B | Pts | Team | G | B | Pts |
|---|---|---|---|---|---|---|---|---|---|---|---|---|---|---|---|---|---|
| University Hawks | 14 | 0 | 1 | 0 | 1469 | 815 | 180.25% | 56 | 1st Semi | Hermit Park | 15 | 21 | 111 | Curra Swans | 9 | 9 | 63 |
| Thuringowa | 7 | 0 | 7 | 1 | 1417 | 1126 | 125.84% | 30 | 2nd Semi | University Hawks | 11 | 14 | 80 | Thuringowa | 12 | 7 | 79 |
| Hermit Park | 6 | 0 | 9 | 0 | 1199 | 1336 | 89.75% | 24 | Preliminary | Thuringowa | 21 | 16 | 142 | Hermit Park | 11 | 6 | 72 |
| Curra Swans | 2 | 0 | 12 | 1 | 928 | 1736 | 53.46% | 10 | Grand | University Hawks | 17 | 12 | 114 | Thuringowa | 15 | 6 | 96 |

== 2010 Ladder ==
| AFL Townsville | Wins | Byes | Losses | Draws | For | Against | % | Pts | Final | Team | G | B | Pts | Team | G | B | Pts |
|---|---|---|---|---|---|---|---|---|---|---|---|---|---|---|---|---|---|
| Thuringowa | 12 | 0 | 3 | 0 | 1645 | 942 | 174.63% | 48 | 1st Semi | Hermit Park | 22 | 13 | 145 | Curra Swans | 13 | 7 | 85 |
| University Hawks | 9 | 0 | 6 | 0 | 1377 | 1122 | 122.73% | 36 | 2nd Semi | University Hawks | 15 | 16 | 106 | Thuringowa | 10 | 10 | 70 |
| Hermit Park | 9 | 0 | 6 | 0 | 1395 | 1182 | 118.02% | 36 | Preliminary | Thuringowa | 17 | 11 | 113 | Hermit Park | 10 | 8 | 68 |
| Curra Swans | 0 | 0 | 15 | 0 | 807 | 1978 | 40.80% | 0 | Grand | Thuringowa | 7 | 11 | 53 | University Hawks | 6 | 12 | 48 |

== 2011 Ladder ==
| AFL Townsville | Wins | Byes | Losses | Draws | For | Against | % | Pts | Final | Team | G | B | Pts | Team | G | B | Pts |
|---|---|---|---|---|---|---|---|---|---|---|---|---|---|---|---|---|---|
| Thuringowa | 13 | 0 | 2 | 0 | 1435 | 888 | 161.60% | 52 | 1st Semi | Curra Swans | 16 | 13 | 109 | University Hawks | 10 | 9 | 69 |
| Hermit Park | 10 | 0 | 5 | 0 | 1306 | 968 | 134.92% | 40 | 2nd Semi | Thuringowa | 11 | 7 | 73 | Hermit Park | 9 | 9 | 63 |
| Curra Swans | 6 | 0 | 9 | 0 | 1090 | 1193 | 91.37% | 24 | Preliminary | Hermit Park | 14 | 13 | 97 | Curra Swans | 13 | 13 | 91 |
| University Hawks | 1 | 0 | 14 | 0 | 771 | 1553 | 49.65% | 4 | Grand | Thuringowa | 13 | 14 | 92 | Hermit Park | 4 | 11 | 35 |

== 2012 Ladder ==
| AFL Townsville | Wins | Byes | Losses | Draws | For | Against | % | Pts | Final | Team | G | B | Pts | Team | G | B | Pts |
|---|---|---|---|---|---|---|---|---|---|---|---|---|---|---|---|---|---|
| Thuringowa | 16 | 4 | 0 | 0 | 2154 | 932 | 231.12% | 64 | 1st Semi | University Hawks | 15 | 12 | 102 | Curra Swans | 7 | 4 | 46 |
| Hermit Park | 9 | 4 | 7 | 0 | 1999 | 1066 | 187.52% | 36 | 2nd Semi | Thuringowa | 17 | 6 | 108 | Hermit Park | 9 | 11 | 65 |
| University Hawks | 9 | 4 | 7 | 0 | 1648 | 1125 | 146.49% | 36 | Preliminary | Hermit Park | 12 | 9 | 81 | University Hawks | 9 | 9 | 63 |
| Curra Swans | 6 | 4 | 10 | 0 | 1320 | 1382 | 95.51% | 24 | Grand | Hermit Park | 12 | 10 | 82 | Thuringowa | 9 | 9 | 63 |
| Townsville City Lions | 0 | 4 | 16 | 0 | 421 | 3037 | 13.86% | 0 | | | | | | | | | |

== 2013 Ladder ==
| AFL Townsville | Wins | Byes | Losses | Draws | For | Against | % | Pts | Final | Team | G | B | Pts | Team | G | B | Pts |
|---|---|---|---|---|---|---|---|---|---|---|---|---|---|---|---|---|---|
| Thuringowa | 13 | 4 | 2 | 1 | 2041 | 794 | 257.05% | 54 | 1st Semi | Curra Swans | 10 | 11 | 71 | University Hawks | 7 | 14 | 56 |
| Hermit Park | 13 | 4 | 2 | 1 | 1638 | 941 | 174.07% | 54 | 2nd Semi | Thuringowa | 15 | 14 | 104 | Hermit Park | 2 | 7 | 19 |
| Curra Swans | 6 | 4 | 10 | 0 | 1064 | 1585 | 67.13% | 24 | Preliminary | Hermit Park | 9 | 11 | 65 | Curra Swans | 8 | 8 | 56 |
| University Hawks | 5 | 4 | 11 | 0 | 1069 | 1273 | 83.97% | 20 | Grand | Thuringowa | 13 | 14 | 92 | Hermit Park | 12 | 5 | 77 |
| Townsville City Lions | 2 | 4 | 14 | 0 | 783 | 2002 | 39.11% | 8 | | | | | | | | | |

== 2014 Ladder ==
| AFL Townsville | Wins | Byes | Losses | Draws | For | Against | % | Pts | Final | Team | G | B | Pts | Team | G | B | Pts |
|---|---|---|---|---|---|---|---|---|---|---|---|---|---|---|---|---|---|
| Thuringowa | 16 | 4 | 0 | 0 | 2205 | 654 | 337.16% | 64 | 1st Semi | Hermit Park | 11 | 10 | 76 | University Hawks | 5 | 3 | 33 |
| Curra Swans | 10 | 4 | 6 | 0 | 1656 | 1053 | 157.26% | 40 | 2nd Semi | Thuringowa | 18 | 9 | 117 | Curra Swans | 7 | 12 | 54 |
| Hermit Park | 10 | 4 | 6 | 0 | 1626 | 1086 | 149.72% | 40 | Preliminary | Hermit Park | 10 | 15 | 75 | Curra Swans | 9 | 10 | 64 |
| University Hawks | 4 | 4 | 12 | 0 | 1024 | 1410 | 72.62% | 16 | Grand | Thuringowa | 26 | 11 | 167 | Hermit Park | 9 | 3 | 57 |
| Townsville City Lions | 0 | 4 | 16 | 0 | 530 | 2838 | 18.68% | 0 | | | | | | | | | |

== 2015 Ladder ==
| AFL Townsville | Wins | Byes | Losses | Draws | For | Against | % | Pts | Final | Team | G | B | Pts | Team | G | B | Pts |
|---|---|---|---|---|---|---|---|---|---|---|---|---|---|---|---|---|---|
| Thuringowa | 14 | 4 | 2 | 0 | 2069 | 656 | 315.40% | 56 | 1st Semi | University Hawks | 17 | 18 | 120 | Curra Swans | 8 | 8 | 56 |
| Hermit Park | 14 | 4 | 2 | 0 | 1728 | 809 | 213.60% | 56 | 2nd Semi | Thuringowa | 17 | 13 | 115 | Hermit Park | 6 | 14 | 50 |
| University Hawks | 5 | 4 | 11 | 0 | 1020 | 1349 | 75.61% | 20 | Preliminary | Hermit Park | 17 | 11 | 113 | Curra Swans | 4 | 7 | 31 |
| Curra Swans | 5 | 4 | 11 | 0 | 1056 | 1428 | 73.95% | 20 | Grand | Hermit Park | 13 | 8 | 86 | Thuringowa | 8 | 17 | 65 |
| Townsville City Lions | 2 | 4 | 14 | 0 | 638 | 2269 | 28.12% | 8 | | | | | | | | | |

== 2016 Ladder ==
| AFL Townsville | Wins | Byes | Losses | Draws | For | Against | % | Pts | Final | Team | G | B | Pts | Team | G | B | Pts |
|---|---|---|---|---|---|---|---|---|---|---|---|---|---|---|---|---|---|
| Thuringowa | 16 | 4 | 0 | 0 | 1780 | 586 | 303.75% | 64 | 1st Semi | University Hawks | 15 | 7 | 97 | Northern Beaches Suns | 4 | 4 | 28 |
| Hermit Park | 9 | 4 | 7 | 0 | 1342 | 841 | 159.57% | 36 | 2nd Semi | Thuringowa | 17 | 10 | 112 | Hermit Park | 6 | 10 | 46 |
| University Hawks | 9 | 4 | 7 | 0 | 1277 | 1027 | 124.34% | 36 | Preliminary | Hermit Park | 9 | 9 | 63 | University Hawks | 2 | 8 | 20 |
| Northern Beaches Suns | 6 | 4 | 10 | 0 | 1039 | 1192 | 87.16% | 24 | Grand | Thuringowa | 12 | 14 | 86 | Hermit Park | 5 | 4 | 34 |
| Curra Swans | 0 | 4 | 16 | 0 | 563 | 2355 | 23.91% | 0 | | | | | | | | | |

== 2017 Ladder ==
| AFL Townsville | Wins | Byes | Losses | Draws | For | Against | % | Pts | Final | Team | G | B | Pts | Team | G | B | Pts |
|---|---|---|---|---|---|---|---|---|---|---|---|---|---|---|---|---|---|
| Hermit Park | 14 | 4 | 2 | 0 | 2040 | 562 | 362.99% | 56 | 1st Semi | Thuringowa | 10 | 16 | 76 | Northern Beaches | 9 | 6 | 60 |
| University Hawks | 14 | 4 | 2 | 0 | 1600 | 759 | 210.80% | 56 | 2nd Semi | Hermit Park | 17 | 11 | 113 | University Hawks | 4 | 4 | 28 |
| Thuringowa | 7 | 4 | 9 | 0 | 1417 | 1004 | 141.14% | 28 | Preliminary | University Hawks | 9 | 15 | 69 | Thuringowa | 4 | 4 | 28 |
| Northern Beaches Suns | 4 | 4 | 12 | 0 | 813 | 1608 | 50.56% | 16 | Grand | Hermit Park | 17 | 14 | 116 | University Hawks | 8 | 9 | 57 |
| Curra Swans | 1 | 4 | 15 | 0 | 347 | 2284 | 15.19% | 4 | | | | | | | | | |

== 2018 Ladder ==
| AFL Townsville | Wins | Byes | Losses | Draws | For | Against | % | Pts | Final | Team | G | B | Pts | Team | G | B | Pts |
|---|---|---|---|---|---|---|---|---|---|---|---|---|---|---|---|---|---|
| Hermit Park | 15 | 4 | 1 | 0 | 2035 | 693 | 293.65% | 60 | 1st Semi | University Hawks | 12 | 17 | 89 | Northern Beaches Suns | 7 | 6 | 48 |
| Thuringowa | 10 | 4 | 6 | 0 | 1523 | 1032 | 147.58% | 40 | 2nd Semi | Hermit Park | 13 | 9 | 87 | Thuringowa | 8 | 10 | 58 |
| University Hawks | 10 | 4 | 6 | 0 | 1326 | 1211 | 109.50% | 40 | Preliminary | University Hawks | 18 | 18 | 126 | Thuringowa | 12 | 7 | 79 |
| Northern Beaches Suns | 4 | 4 | 12 | 0 | 990 | 1469 | 67.39% | 16 | Grand | Hermit Park | 12 | 11 | 83 | University Hawks | 10 | 12 | 72 |
| Curra Swans | 1 | 4 | 15 | 0 | 676 | 2145 | 31.52% | 4 | | | | | | | | | |

== 2019 Ladder ==
| AFL Townsville | Wins | Byes | Losses | Draws | For | Against | % | Pts | Final | Team | G | B | Pts | Team | G | B | Pts |
|---|---|---|---|---|---|---|---|---|---|---|---|---|---|---|---|---|---|
| Hermit Park | 12 | 4 | 2 | 0 | 1317 | 714 | 184.45% | 48 | 1st Semi | Curra Swans | 8 | 13 | 61 | University Hawks | 7 | 10 | 52 |
| Thuringowa | 10 | 4 | 4 | 0 | 1276 | 684 | 186.55% | 40 | 2nd Semi | Hermit Park | 8 | 13 | 61 | Thuringowa | 7 | 10 | 52 |
| Curra Swans | 7 | 4 | 7 | 0 | 1044 | 1145 | 91.18% | 28 | Preliminary | Thuringowa | 18 | 9 | 117 | Curra Swans | 14 | 9 | 93 |
| University Hawks | 5 | 4 | 9 | 0 | 890 | 1062 | 83.80% | 20 | Grand | Hermit Park | 13 | 10 | 88 | Thuringowa | 11 | 7 | 73 |
| Northern Beaches Suns | 1 | 4 | 13 | 0 | 639 | 1561 | 40.94% | 4 | | | | | | | | | |

== 2020 Ladder ==
| AFL Townsville | Wins | Byes | Losses | Draws | For | Against | % | Pts | Final | Team | G | B | Pts | Team | G | B | Pts |
|---|---|---|---|---|---|---|---|---|---|---|---|---|---|---|---|---|---|
| Curra Swans | 8 | 2 | 0 | 0 | 1060 | 197 | 538.07% | 32 | 1st Semi | Hermit Park Tigers | 11 | 5 | 71 | University Hawks | 8 | 6 | 54 |
| Thuringowa Bulldogs | 6 | 2 | 2 | 0 | 844 | 295 | 286.10% | 24 | 2nd Semi | Curra Swans | 12 | 12 | 84 | Thuringowa Bulldogs | 2 | 3 | 15 |
| Hermit Park Tigers | 4 | 2 | 4 | 0 | 493 | 486 | 101.44% | 16 | Preliminary | Thuringowa Bulldogs | 9 | 15 | 69 | Hermit Park Tigers | 8 | 5 | 53 |
| University Hawks | 2 | 2 | 6 | 0 | 331 | 683 | 48.46% | 8 | Grand | Curra Swans | 8 | 8 | 56 | Thuringowa Bulldogs | 7 | 7 | 49 |
| Northern Beaches Suns | 0 | 2 | 8 | 0 | 203 | 1270 | 15.98% | 0 | | | | | | | | | |

== See also ==
- Australian Rules football in Queensland
