= 2024 QAFLW season =

24th season of the QAFL Women's

- Date: 6 April − 25 August 2024
- Teams: 8
- Premiers: Southport; 1st premiership
- Minor premiers: Southport; 2nd minor premiership
- Emma Zielke Medallist: Steph O'Brien (Southport − 28 votes)
- Leading goalkicker: Jessica Stallard (Aspley − 34 goals)

The 2024 QAFLW season was the 24th season of the QAFL Women's (QAFLW), the highest-level senior women's Australian rules football competition in Queensland. The season featured eight clubs, beginning on 6 April and concluding on 25 August.

The premiership was won by Southport for the first time, after they defeated Bond University by 35 points in the 2024 QAFLW Grand Final at People First Stadium.

== Ladder ==
Pos	Team	Pld	W	L	D	PF	PA	PP	Pts	Qualification
1	Southport (P)	14	12	2	0	885	241	367.2	48	Finals series
2	Aspley	14	12	2	0	797	311	256.3	48	Finals series
3	Bond University	14	11	3	0	693	282	245.7	44	Finals series
4	Coorparoo	14	6	8	0	453	600	75.5	24	Finals series
5	Wilston Grange	14	6	8	0	370	555	66.7	24	
6	UQ Red Lions	14	5	9	0	438	490	89.4	20	
7	Maroochydore	14	4	10	0	333	677	49.2	16	
8	Yeronga	14	0	14	0	202	1015	19.9	0	

Rules for classification: 1) points; 2) percentage; 3) number of points for.
(P) Premiers

== Finals series ==
=== Semi-finals ===
	Semi-finals
Saturday, 10 August (2:15 pm)	Southport 7.5 (47)	def.	Aspley 4.1 (25)	Fankhauser Reserve
Saturday, 10 August (2:15 pm)	Bond University 10.8 (68)	def.	Coorparoo 2.3 (15)	Bond University Oval

=== Preliminary final ===
	Preliminary final
Saturday, 17 August (4:45 pm)	Aspley 4.3 (27)	def. by	Bond University 4.7 (31)	Graham Road Oval

=== Grand Final ===
2024 QAFLW Grand Final
Sunday, 25 August (2:30 pm)	Southport	def.	Bond University	People First Stadium
2.3 (15); 4.5 (29); 6.5 (41); 8.6 (54)	Q1; Q2; Q3; Final	2.1 (13); 3.1 (19); 3.1 (19); 3.1 (19)
Welsh 3, Baldwin 2, Baron, Davies, Gregory, Baltais	Goals	Kaslar 2, Parker
Kimber, Schipp, Davies, Fogas, Zerafa, Milne	Best	Salisbury, Lightfoot, Milne, Harris, White, Samuels

== Awards ==
- Steph O'Brien (Southport) won the Emma Zielke Medal as the QAFLW's best and fairest player, finishing with 28 votes. This was the second year in a row that O'Brien had won the award.
- Jessica Stallard (Aspley) was the leading goalkicker, finishing the season with 34 goals.
- Dekota Baron (Southport) won the Rising Star award.
- Steph O'Brien (Southport) won the Coaches MVP (Most Valuable Player) award for the second year in a row.

=== Team of the Year ===
2024 QAFLW Team of the Year
B:	Sara-Jane O'Grady (Maroochydore)	Kaylee Kimber (Southport)	
HB:	Jasmyn Davidson (Bond University)	Ayla Fetahagic (Coorparoo)	Gracie Roy (UQ Red Lions)
C:	Lucy Schneider (Coorparoo)	Jessica Davy (Aspley)	Keyshia Matenga (Wilston Grange)
HF:	Ella Calleja (Bond University)	Steph O'Brien (c) (Southport)	Summer Hamilton (Wilston Grange)
F:	Maddy Baldwin (Southport)	Jessica Stallard (Aspley)	
Foll:	Georja Davies (Southport)	Madeleine Watt (Southport)	Louise Tyson (Aspley)
Int:	Jane Childes (UQ Red Lions)	Lucia Liessi (Aspley)	Laura Roy (UQ Red Lions)
Int:	Courtney Sexton (Bond University)	Chelsea Winn (Yeronga)	
Coach:	Peter Doherty (Southport)		

=== Club best and fairest ===
Club	Winner	Ref
Aspley	Louise Tyson	
Bond University	Shannon Nolan	
Coorparoo	Grace Roberts-White	
Maroochydore	Shannon Campbell	
Southport	Maddy Watt	
UQ Red Lions	Jane Childes	
Wilston Grange	Keyshia Matenga	
Yeronga	Jamie Howell	

== See also ==
- 2024 QAFL season
- 2024 AFL Queensland season
