= Southport Sharks =

Australian rules football club

Names
- Full name: Southport Australian Football Club
- Nickname: Sharks
- Former nickname: Magpies
- Club song: Good Ol Southport Forever

Club details
- Founded: 22 May 1961; 65 years ago
- Competition: VFL: Senior men QAFLW: Senior women QAFL: Juniors (mixed)
- President: Clayton Glenister
- Coach: VFL: Matthew Primus; QAFLW: Matthew Lappin
- Captain(s): VFL: Jacob Dawson/Brayden Crossley; QAFLW: Rianna Schipp
- Ground: Fankhauser Reserve (8,000)

Uniforms
Home	Away

Other information
- Official website: southportsharks.com.au

The Southport Australian Football Club, nicknamed the Sharks, is an Australian rules football club based on the Gold Coast, Queensland, that competes in the Victorian Football League (VFL) and the QAFL Women's (QAFLW). It has played its home matches at Fankhauser Reserve since 1989.

Southport is one of the most successful football clubs in Queensland, having claimed 22 senior-grade men's premierships across multiple competitions since it was established in 1961. It competed in the Gold Coast Australian Football League (GCAFL) from its formation in 1961 until 1983, when it moved to the Queensland Australian Football League (QAFL). In 2011, the club was elevated to the North East Australian Football League (NEAFL), before moving to the VFL after the NEAFL dissolved in 2020. Southport has fielded a senior women's team since 2020, which has competed in the QAFLW since 2022.

== History ==
=== Formation and early GCAFL years (1961–1982) ===
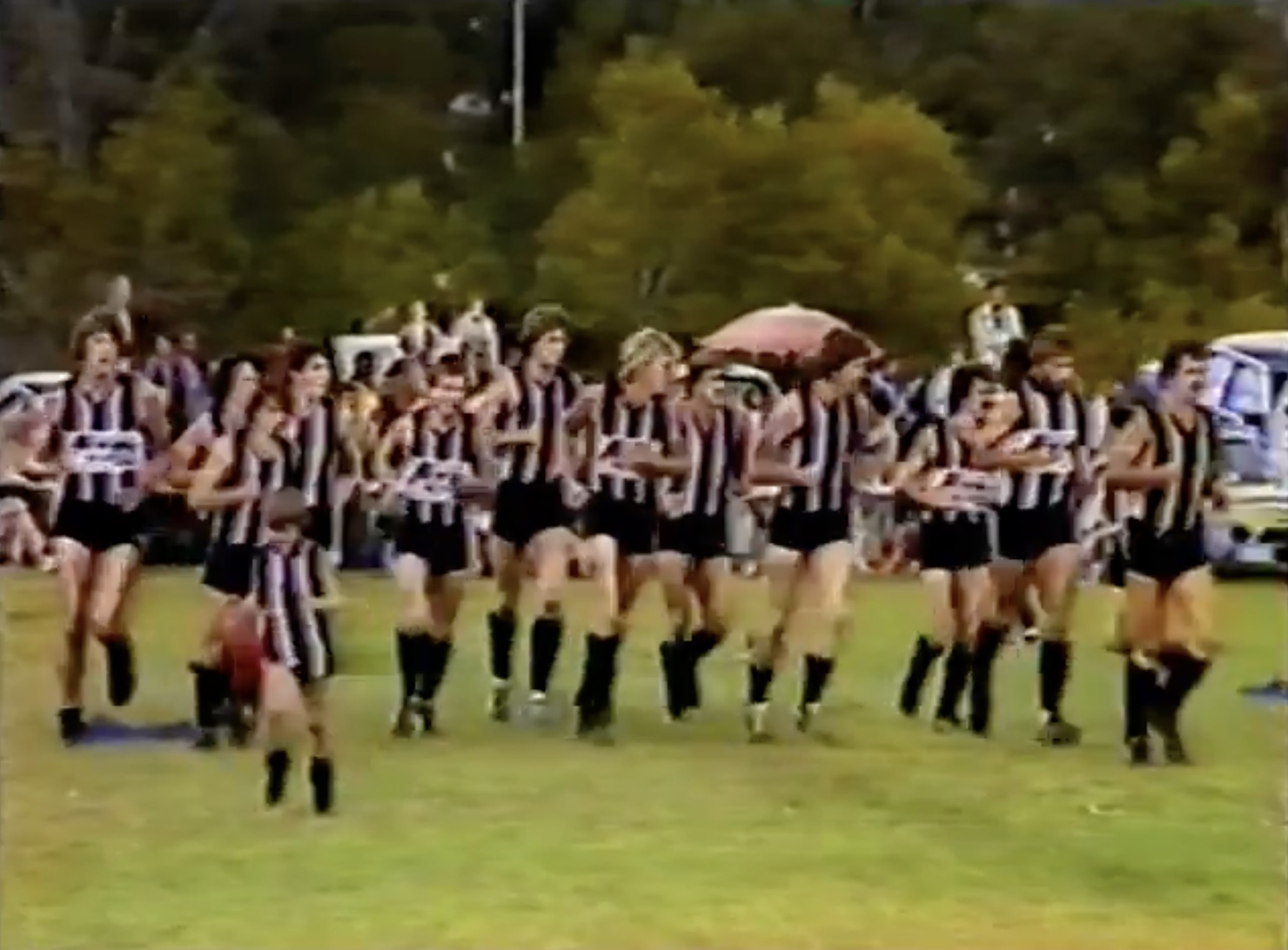
Southport players running out for the 1982 GCAFL Grand Final, its final match as the "Magpies" and its final in the GCAFL

On 22 May 1961, the Southport Australian Football Club was formed and six days later the first training session was held at Labrador Sports Oval. It was revealed on 7 June 1961 that the club would be known on as the Southport Magpies and would wear a black and white vertical striped jumper similar to the Collingwood Football Club.

In front of 1,000 spectators, Southport played their first ever game against the Central Football Club on 25 June 1961. Southport came out victorious in their first outing 8.10.58 to Central's 6.11.47. They would then go on to win the first ever Gold Coast Australian Football League premiership with a 13-point victory over Ipswich on 25 September 1961.

With the expansion of the Gold Coast Australian Football League starting in 1962, Southport moved their home ground to Owen Park. Southport won back-to-back premierships in the first two years of the Gold Coast Australian Football League, defeating Currumbin by 53 points to win their second premiership. Following a series of local premierships, the club applied for entry into the Queensland Australian Football League in July 1981. Twelve months later, the Queensland Australian Football League officially accepted Southport's entry application for the 1983 season.

In their last game as part of the GCAFL, the Southport Magpies fell in the Grand Final to Coolangatta by 28 points. The disappointment of the Grand Final loss was short lived as the rebranding from the Southport Magpies to the Southport Sharks began. The strip was changed to a black V on a white background to avoid an identity conflict with the Sherwood Magpies (which later became the Western Magpies). The decision as to which club would retain the "Magpies" moniker was made by the toss of a coin.

=== New competitions (1983–) ===
==== QAFL (1983–1999) ====
Upon entrance into the Queensland Australian Football League (QAFL), the newly formed Southport Sharks were given little chance of success against the predominantly Brisbane based competition. In their first game of the 1983 season, the Sharks walked away winners with a victory over the Western Districts. They would compile a 12–6 win–loss record during the home and away season. The Sharks going undefeated through the 1983 finals series and would win the Grand Final by 13 points over Morningside. The Sharks would continue to prove themselves through the 80s with another three premierships added to their trophy cabinet as well as two runners-up. Early in 1989, the Sharks moved their headquarters to their current ground Fankhauser Reserve.

The club continued their dominance with an unbeaten season in 1990 but the club's financial woes were a big issue following a Grand Final loss in 1991. The club almost abandoned the QAFL late in 1991 to re-enter the Gold Coast Australian Football League, but Queensland's introduction of poker machines would secure the financial future of the Sharks. By 1995 the Sharks had reached 20,000 members began to lead the charge for a second Queensland team entering the Australian Football League. In 1996, the Sharks made their first bid to the AFL for inclusion in the national league, which was rejected by the AFL in favour of the Port Adelaide Football Club's elevation from the SANFL. After which, the club continued to lobby for a licence.

Following the AFL's rejection of the Sharks into the national league, the Sharks would set out to prove just how good they really were. The team would win three premierships in a row in 1997, 1998 and 1999 to finish off the millennium with success. In 1999 the Sharks were able to poach future St Kilda Saints star Nick Riewoldt from their cross-town rivals Broadbeach Cats, although Riewoldt would not compete for the Sharks senior side until 2000.

==== New Millennium and dominance (2000–2010) ====
The Sharks would enter the 2000 season as the raging favourites to take out a fourth consecutive premiership. Soon to be number 1 AFL draft pick Nick Riewoldt would play a huge role in their Grand Final victory over the Northern Eagles. Riewoldt would be kept virtually touchless in the first half when matching up against future Brisbane Lions player Jamie Charman. Riewoldt was moved to ruck and would go on to kick two goals in the Sharks Grand Final victory. The four consecutive premierships would be Southport's last taste of success for five years as the club entered a rebuilding phase. Former AFL player Paul Dimattina pulled on the Sharks guernsey in 2005 and would lead the team to their first premiership in five years. The Sharks would continue their success with another three Grand Finals between 2006 and 2008 in which the Sharks would come away with two more premierships. In November 2010 it was announced the Sharks would be joining the newly formed North East Australian Football League which included four AFL reserves sides and local teams spread throughout Canberra, New South Wales, Northern Territory and Queensland.

==== NEAFL (2011–2020) ====
The Sharks put together a 9–9 win–loss record in the 2011 NEAFL season but missed the finals series by percentage, their first non-finals season ever. The Sharks finished the 2012 NEAFL season with a 14–4 win–loss record and were placed third on the ladder. In the qualifying final, the Sharks fell to the Brisbane Lions reserves team but recorded their first NEAFL finals victory over Redland the following week. The Sharks faced the Northern Territory Thunder in the preliminary finals but lost by 37 points.

The club won its first and only NEAFL premiership in controversial circumstances in 2018, defeating Sydney reserves in the Grand Final. Southport dominated the game, and led 12.4 (76) to 2.4 (16) at three-quarter time, but then accidentally sent nineteen men onto the field to start the final quarter. Sydney called for a head count after twenty seconds and the extra man was discovered, which would traditionally have resulted in Southport's score being re-set to zero for the final quarter; however, officials determined that since the breach had an immaterial effect on the game, Southport would retain its score and the only penalty would be a free kick and fifty metre penalty, resulting in one Sydney goal. Southport went on to win 14.6 (90) to 5.5. (35).

==== VFL (2021–) ====
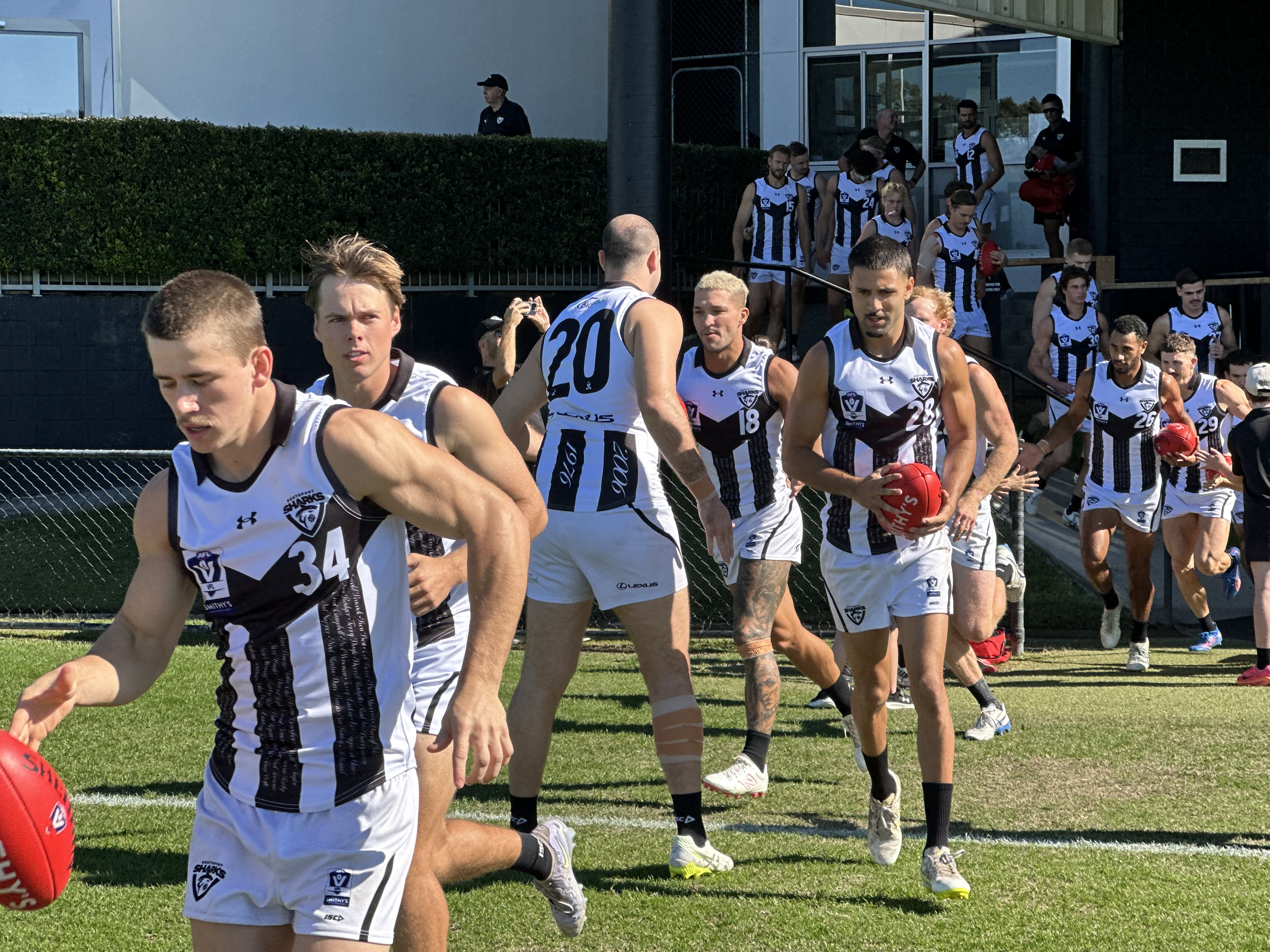
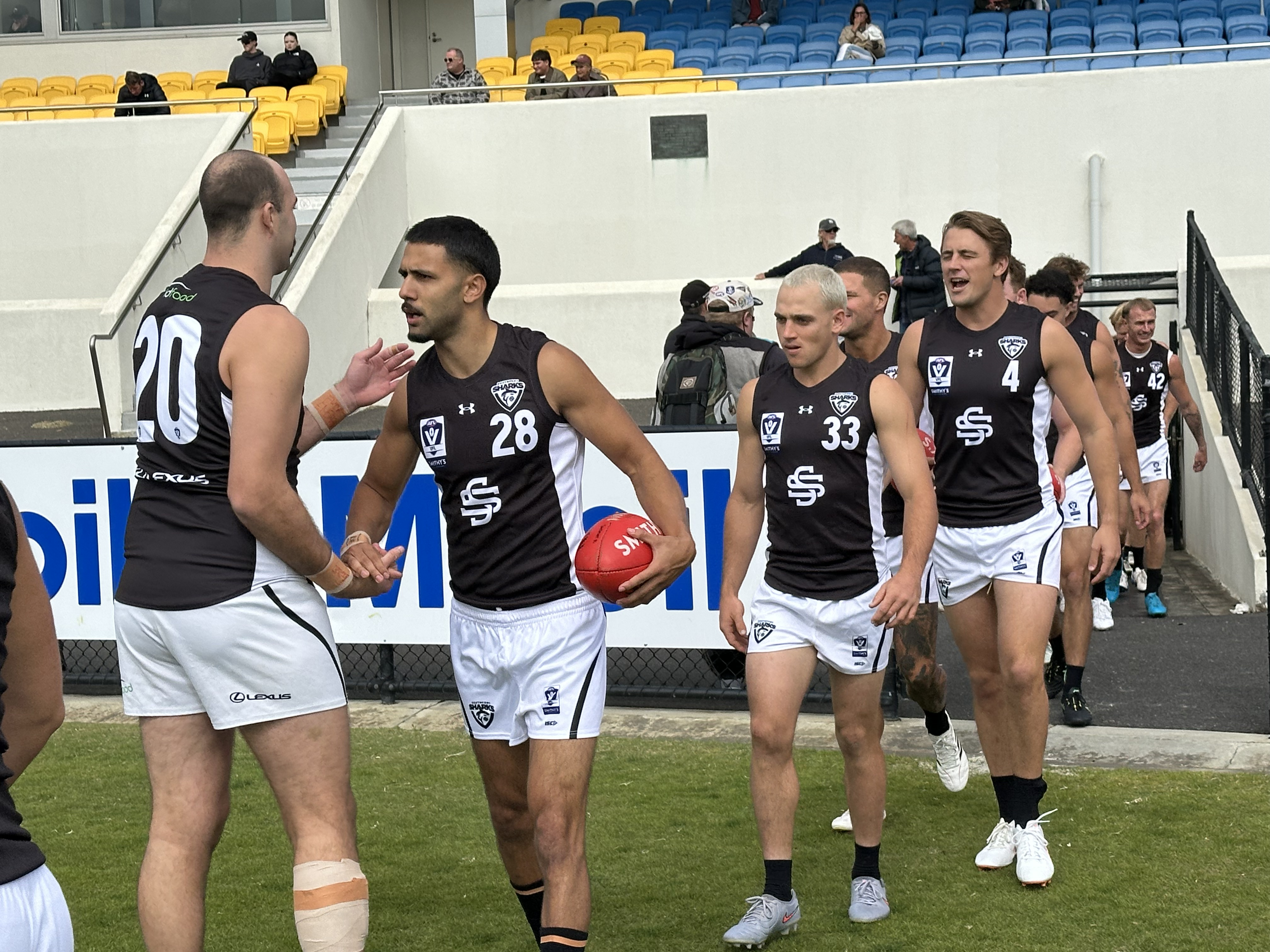
Southport players wearing a heritage guernsey (left) and away guernsey (right) whilst competing in the VFL.

Following the cessation of the NEAFL in 2020 during the COVID-19 pandemic, Southport was granted entry into an expanded Victorian Football League for the 2021 season; along with Brisbane's Aspley, it was one of two standalone non-Victorian teams without a reserves affiliation to an Australian Football League club; and after Aspley's departure after one season, Southport remains the only such club. The Sharks found quick success in the VFL, and has four second-placed finishes inside its first five seasons: in 2021, it was positioned second with a 9–1 record before the season was curtailed due to the COVID-19 pandemic; in 2022, the club qualified for the grand final from third on the ladder, and was defeated by the Casey Demons by 32 points; in 2024, the club qualified for the grand final from fifth place, and was defeated by Werribee by six points; and in 2025 the club qualified for the grand final from third on the ladder, and was defeated by the Footscray reserves by ten points.

== Rivalries ==
=== Broadbeach Cats ===
One of the most intense rivalries in local Queensland football exists between the neighbouring clubs in the form of the Sharks and the Broadbeach Cats and stretches back to their first meeting in 1971. Matches between the two teams generally result in a larger audience and a heated contest on the field. As of the completion of the 2013 NEAFL season, the win–loss record between the two clubs stands at 70–10 in favour of the Sharks. The Cats were removed from the North East Australian Football League at the conclusion of the 2013 season which has resulted in the rivalry not continuing at the senior level.

=== Gold Coast Suns ===
Matches between Southport and the Gold Coast Suns are often referred to as the Coast Clash and have occurred on a regular basis since 2011 when both teams entered the North East Australian Football League. The first ever competitive match that the Suns competed in took place in March 2009 against a reigning 2008 QAFL premiership Southport team and the Sharks would win the encounter 6.3 (39) to 3.5 (23) at Carrara Stadium. The two teams met in a 2022 VFL preliminary final, with Southport emerging victorious 14.25 (109) to 13.3 (81) at Fankhauser Reserve.

== Honours ==
=== Men's senior premierships ===
No.	Year	Competition	Opponent	Score	Venue
1	1961	GCAFL	Ipswich	9.12 (66) – 7.11 (53)	Labrador Sports Ground
2	1962	GCAFL	Currumbin Lions	9.18 (72) – 2.7 (19)	Labrador Sports Ground
3	1966	GCAFL	Surfers Paradise Demons	14.24 (108) – 7.16 (58)	Salk Oval
4	1975	GCAFL	Coolangatta Blues	26.16 (172) – 17.16 (118)	Salk Oval
5	1976	GCAFL	Broadbeach Cats	14.11 (95) – 9.14 (68)	Salk Oval
6	1977	GCAFL	Coolangatta Blues	22.18 (150) – 13.9 (87)	Salk Oval
7	1979	GCAFL	Coolangatta Blues	17.16 (118) – 16.19 (115)	Salk Oval
8	1980	GCAFL	Palm Beach Currumbin Lions	17.18 (120) – 15.8 (98)	Salk Oval
9	1983	QAFL	Morningside Panthers	13.12 (90) – 12.5 (77)	Windsor Park
10	1985	QAFL	Mayne Tigers	11.8 (74) – 10.11 (71)	Windsor Park
11	1987	QAFL	Windsor-Zillmere Eagles	13.17 (75) – 11.6 (72)	Windsor Park
12	1989	QAFL	Windsor-Zillmere Eagles	16.17 (113) – 12.5 (77)	Brisbane Cricket Ground
13	1990	QAFL	Morningside Panthers	22.14 (146) – 12.15 (87)	Brisbane Cricket Ground
14	1992	QAFL	Morningside Panthers	14.19 (94) – 12.9 (80)	Brisbane Cricket Ground
15	1997	QSFL	Mount Gravatt Vultures	26.13 (169) – 11.9 (75)	Windsor Park
16	1998	QSFL	Morningside Panthers	12.15 (87) – 11.10 (76)	Giffin Park
17	1999	QSFL	North Brisbane Eagles	15.14 (104) – 9.7 (61)	Giffin Park
18	2000	QAFL	North Brisbane Eagles	10.8 (68) – 8.11 (59)	Giffin Park
19	2005	QAFL	Morningside Panthers	16.15 (111) – 6.14 (50)	Brisbane Cricket Ground
20	2006	QAFL	Zillmere Eagles	17.14 (116) – 16.8 (104)	Carrara Stadium
21	2008	QAFL	Morningside Panthers	18.7 (115) – 15.17 (107)	Carrara Stadium
22	2018	NEAFL	Sydney Swans reserves	14.6 (90) – 5.5 (35)	Fankhauser Reserve

=== Women's senior premierships ===
No.	Year	Competition	Opponent	Score	Venue
1	2024	QAFLW	Bond University	8.6 (54) – 3.1 (19)	People First Stadium

=== Grogan Medallists ===
- Peter Guy – 1983
- Zane Taylor – 1985
- Jason Cotter – 1990 / 1993
- David Crutchfield – 1992
- Chris O'Sullivan – 1992
- David Bain – 1995 / 1999
- Jeff Brennan – 1997
- David Round – 2002
- Danny Wise – 2010
- Matthew Payne – 2011
- Fraser Pope – 2012
- Haydn Kiel – 2013

=== QAFL leading goalkickers ===
- Rod Mackay (85) – 1998
- Rod Mackay (66) – 1999
- Rod Mackay (79) – 2000
- Ben McEntee (119) – 2004
- Ben McEntee (84) – 2005
- Ben McEntee (100) – 2007
- Ben McEntee (66) – 2008

=== Club records ===
==== Men's ====
Record	Total	League	Game
Biggest win	287 points	GCAFL	vs Lismore – Round 4, 1978 at Owen Park
Biggest win	135 points	NEAFL	vs Gold Coast – Round 14, 2014 at Metricon Stadium
Biggest win	109 points	VFL	vs Aspley – Round 5, 2021 at Graham Road Oval

==== Women's ====
Record	Total	League	Game
Biggest win	219 points	QAFLW	vs Yeronga – Round 1, 2025 at Leyshon Park

== Seasons ==
Premiers	Grand Finalist	Minor premiers	Finals appearance	Wildcard Round appearance	Wooden spoon	League leading goalkicker	League best and fairest

=== Men's ===
==== Seniors ====
Year	League	Finish	W	L	D	Coach	Captain	Doc Mackenzie Medal	Leading goalkicker		Ref
1983	QAFL	1st	12	6	0	Norm Dare	Gavin McGuane	Peter Guy			
1984	QAFL	3rd	11	7	0	Norm Dare		Peter Guy	Gavin Exell	66	
1985	QAFL	1st	16	2	0	Norm Dare	Gavin McGuane	Jason Cotter; Zane Taylor	Brett Thompson	89	
1986	QAFL	2nd	15	3	0	Norm Dare		Gary Dempsey	Glen Middlemiss	77	
1987	QAFL	1st	17	1	0	Norm Dare	Gavin McGuane	Stuart Glascott	Gary Dempsey	70	
1988	QAFL	2nd	14	2	0	Norm Dare		Craig Crowley	Geoff James	49	
1989	QAFL	1st	16	2	0	Gavan McGuane	Zane Taylor	Craig Crowley	Ray Sarcevic	55	
1990	QAFL	1st	16	0	0	Gavan McGuane	Craig Crowley	Jason Cotter	Cameron O'Brien	83	
1991	QAFL	2nd	16	2	0	Gavan McGuane		Joe Amad; Royce Enders	Craig Headland	84	
1992	QAFL	1st	18	0	0	Cameron O'Brien	Cameron O'Brien	David Crutchfield	Warwick Capper	80	
1993	QAFL	2nd	14	4	0	Cameron O'Brien		Craig Headland	Craig Crowley	45	
1994	QAFL	3rd	14	4	0	Mark Browning		Matt McGuirk	Cameron O'Brien	60	
1995	QAFL	4th	11	7	0	Mark Browning		David Bain	Rod McKay	38	
1996	QAFL	4th	14	6	0	Danny Brennan		David Johnston	Craig Wilson	50	
1997	QSFL	1st	19	3	0	Danny Brennan	David Bain	Jeff Brennan	Brent Green	59	
1998	QSFL	1st	12	4	0	Jason Cotter	David Bain	Shaun Ballans	Rod Mackay	54	
1999	QSFL	1st	16	0	0	Jason Cotter	David Bain	Shaun Ballans	Rod Mackay	74	
2000	AFLQSL	1st	13	5	0	Jason Cotter	David Bain	Mark Bradley	Rod Mackay	80	
2001	AFLQSL	1st	14	4	0	Scott Lawton	Mark Bradley	Mark Bradley	Rod Mackay	95	
2002	AFLQSL	2nd	16	2	0	Scott Lawton		David Round; Luke Jenkins	Stephen McKeon	56	
2003	AFLQSL	4th	15	3	0	Scott Lawton		Darren O'Brien	Shaun Coughlan	43	
2004	AFLQSL	2nd	15	3	0	Norm Dare		David James	Ben McEntee	119	
2005	AFLQSL	1st	16	2	0	Norm Dare	Darren O'Brien	Darren O'Brien	Ben McEntee	90	
2006	AFLQSL	1st	13	5	0	Craig Crowley	Darren O'Brien	David James	Ben McEntee	50	
2007	AFLQSL	2nd	11	8	0	Craig Crowley		Ben McEntee	Ben McEntee	100	
2008	AFLQSL	1st	19	1	1	Craig Crowley	Darren O'Brien	David James	Ben McEntee	72	
2009	QAFL	3rd	14	4	0	Craig Crowley	Danny Wise	Justin Kahlefeldt	Luke Jarjoura	58	
2010	QAFL	3rd	13	5	0	Craig Crowley	Danny Wise	Danny Wise	Cleve Hughes	83	
2011	NEAFL N	7th	9	9	0	Norm Dare		Matthew Payne	Josh Baxter	30	
2012	NEAFL N	3rd	14	4	0	Norm Dare		Jason Burge; Wayde Mills	Josh Baxter	60	
2013	NEAFL N	2nd	14	4	0	Norm Dare		Jason Burge	Josh Baxter	57	
2014	NEAFL	8th	8	10	0	Matt Angus		Wayde Mills	Josh Baxter	42	
2015	NEAFL	6th	8	10	0	Nathan Bock		Josh Hunt			
2016	NEAFL	7th	7	11	0	Nathan Bock		Andrew Boston			
2017	NEAFL	9th	4	14	0	Nathan Bock		Jordan Keras	Hamish Shepheard	33	
2018	NEAFL	1st	12	6	0	Steve Daniel	Andrew Boston; Seb Tape	Mike Manteit	Mitchell Johnson	55	
2019	NEAFL	2nd	13	5	0	Steve Daniel	Andrew Boston; Seb Tape	Andrew Boston	Mitchell Johnson	42	
2020	NEAFL	(No season)				Steve Daniel	Andrew Boston; Seb Tape	(No season)			
2021	VFL	2nd	9	1	0	Steve Daniel	Andrew Boston; Seb Tape	Jacob Dawson	Billy Gowers	30	
2022	VFL	3rd	13	5	0	Steve Daniel	Jacob Dawson; Mike Manteit	Jacob Dawson	Jacob Townsend	37	
2023	VFL	14th	8	10	0	Steve Daniel	Jacob Dawson; Mike Manteit	Jacob Dawson	Fraser Thurlow	33	
2024	VFL	5th	15	7	0	Steve Daniel	Jacob Dawson; Brayden Crossley	Boyd Woodcock	Hugh Dixon	43	

- Although Southport finished second in 2021, no finals series was held as the season was curtailed due to the COVID-19 pandemic

=== Women's ===
==== Seniors ====
Year	League	Finish	W	L	D	Coach	Captain	Best and fairest	Leading goalkicker		Ref
2020	QFAW D1	1st	7	1	0	Ryan Davis	Hannah Davies; Eloise O'Brien	Eloise O'Brien	Hannah Davies	15	
2021	QFAW D1	1st	10	1	3	Ryan Davis	Hannah Davies; Elli Jay Beck	Maddy Watt	Elli Jay Beck	18	
2022	QAFLW	3rd	9	4	1	Ryan Davis	Jess Malouf; Ashlee Flick	Maddy Watt			
2023	QAFLW	1st	13	1	0	Peter Doherty	Jess Malouf	Georgia Breward			
2024	QAFLW	1st	12	2	0	Peter Doherty	Rianna Schipp	Maddy Watt	Maddy Baldwin	28	

== Drafted players ==
=== AFL/VFL ===
Year	Name	Team	Draft No.
1987	Darren Carlson	Brisbane Bears	QLD Zone Selection
1988	Marcus Ashcroft	Brisbane Bears	QLD Zone Selection
1988	Travis Martin-Beynon	North Melbourne	4th (Pre-season)
1989	Matthew Kennedy	Brisbane Bears	QLD Zone Selection
1990	Corey Bell	Brisbane Bears	QLD Zone Selection
1990	Steven McLuckie	Brisbane Bears	QLD Zone Selection
1991	Brent Green	Brisbane Bears	QLD Zone Selection
1994	Steven Lawrence	Brisbane Bears	QLD Zone Selection
1997	Marc Woolnough	Geelong Cats	29th
2000	Nick Riewoldt	St Kilda Saints	1st
2002	Daniel Merrett	Brisbane Lions	30th
2003	Andrew Raines	Richmond Tigers	76th
2004	Brad Moran	North Melbourne Kangaroos	58th
2004	Leigh Ryswyk	Brisbane Lions	– (rookie)
2005	Sam Gilbert	St Kilda Saints	33rd
2005	Wayde Mills	Brisbane Lions	25th
2006	Haydn Kiel	Brisbane Lions	48th (rookie)
2006	Brent Renouf	Hawthorn Hawks	24th
2006	Joel Tippett	Brisbane Lions	57th (rookie)
2006	Kurt Tippett	Adelaide Crows	32nd
2006	Jesse White	Sydney Swans	79th
2008	Dayne Beams	Collingwood Magpies	29th
2009	Broc McCauley	Brisbane Lions	78th (rookie)
2010	Joseph Daye	Gold Coast Suns	QLD Zone Selection
2010	Marc Lock	Gold Coast Suns	QLD Zone Selection
2010	Jack Stanlake	Gold Coast Suns	QLD Zone Selection
2010	Rory Thompson	Gold Coast Suns	QLD Zone Selection
2014	Lachie Weller	Fremantle Dockers	13th
2018	Tom Wilkinson	North Melbourne Kangaroos	41st (rookie)
2024	Ben Jepson	Gold Coast Suns	SSP Selection
2025	Tai Hayes	Brisbane Lions	44th
2026	Campbell Lake	St Kilda Saints	7th (mid-season draft)

=== AFLW ===
Year	Name	Team	Draft No.
2022	Alana Gee	Gold Coast	19th
2022	Fleur Davies	Greater Western Sydney	64th
2022	Kaylee Kimber	Gold Coast	Injury Replacement
2023 sup.	Caitlin Miller	Greater Western Sydney	8th
2023 sup.	Poppy Boltz	Brisbane	17th
2023 sup.	Darcie Davies	Gold Coast	Injury Replacement
2023 sup.	Lilly Pearce	Richmond	Injury Replacement
2025	Sunny Lappin	Gold Coast	4th
2025	Georja Davies	Gold Coast	9th
2025	Alannah Welsh	Gold Coast	12th
2025	Mikayla Nurse	Gold Coast	13th
2025	Dekota Baron	Gold Coast	15th
2025	Rhianna Ingram	Gold Coast	44th

== AFL/VFL players ==
There are list of past and present Southport players who have played at AFL/VFL:

- Jack Anthony (Collingwood and Fremantle)
- Marcus Ashcroft (Brisbane Bears and Brisbane Lions)
- David Bain (Brisbane Bears and Fitzroy)
- Adrian Bassett (Carlton)
- Dayne Beams (Collingwood and Brisbane Lions)
- Corey Bell (Brisbane Bears)
- Nathan Bock (Adelaide and Gold Coast)
- Andrew Boston (Gold Coast)
- Jared Brennan (Brisbane Lions and Gold Coast)
- Warwick Capper (Sydney Swans and Brisbane Bears)
- Darren Carlson (Brisbane Bears)
- David Crutchfield (1965–2002) (Fitzroy)
- Ian Dargie (St. Kilda and West Coast Eagles)
- Gary Dempsey (Footscray and North Melbourne)
- Paul Dimattina (Western Bulldogs)
- Sam Gilbert (St. Kilda)
- Stuart Glascott (Brisbane Bears)
- Brent Green (1976–2009) (Brisbane Bears, Brisbane Lions and Sydney Swans)
- Steven Handley (Geelong)
- Wally Hillis (1938–2006) (Richmond)
- Josh Hunt (Geelong and GWS)
- Matthew Kennedy (Brisbane Bears and Brisbane Lions)
- Trent Knobel (Brisbane Lions, St. Kilda and Richmond)
- Eddie Lake (Essendon)
- Steven Lawrence (Brisbane Bears, Brisbane Lions and St. Kilda)
- Broc McCauley (Brisbane Lions and Hawthorn)
- Steven McLuckie (Brisbane Bears)
- Daniel Merrett (Brisbane Lions)
- Glen Middlemiss (Geelong and St. Kilda)
- Wayde Mills (Brisbane Lions)
- Brad Moran (North Melbourne and Adelaide)
- Chris O'Sullivan (Brisbane Bears)
- Andrew Raines (Richmond, Brisbane Lions and Gold Coast)
- Brent Renouf (Hawthorn and Port Adelaide)
- Nick Riewoldt (St. Kilda)
- David Round (Western Bulldogs)
- Bill Ryan (Geelong)
- Leigh Ryswyk (Brisbane Lions)
- Ray Sarcevic (Geelong)
- Zane Taylor (Geelong)
- Rory Thompson (Gold Coast)
- Joel Tippett (Gold Coast and North Melbourne)
- Kurt Tippett (Adelaide and Sydney Swans)
- Lachie Weller (Fremantle)
- Pat Wellington (1953–1987) (Essendon)
- Jesse White (Sydney Swans and Collingwood)
- Joshua Williams (North Melbourne)
- Marc Woolnough (Geelong)
- Billy Gowers (Carlton and Western Bulldogs)
- Brad Lynch (Western Bulldogs)
- Lukas Webb (Western Bulldogs)
- Boyd Woodcock (Port Adelaide)

== Club song ==
The Southport Sharks club song is sung to the tune of Goodbye Dolly Gray, in imitation of the Collingwood club song due to their origins as the Southport Magpies.
