= Seb Tape =

Australian rules footballer

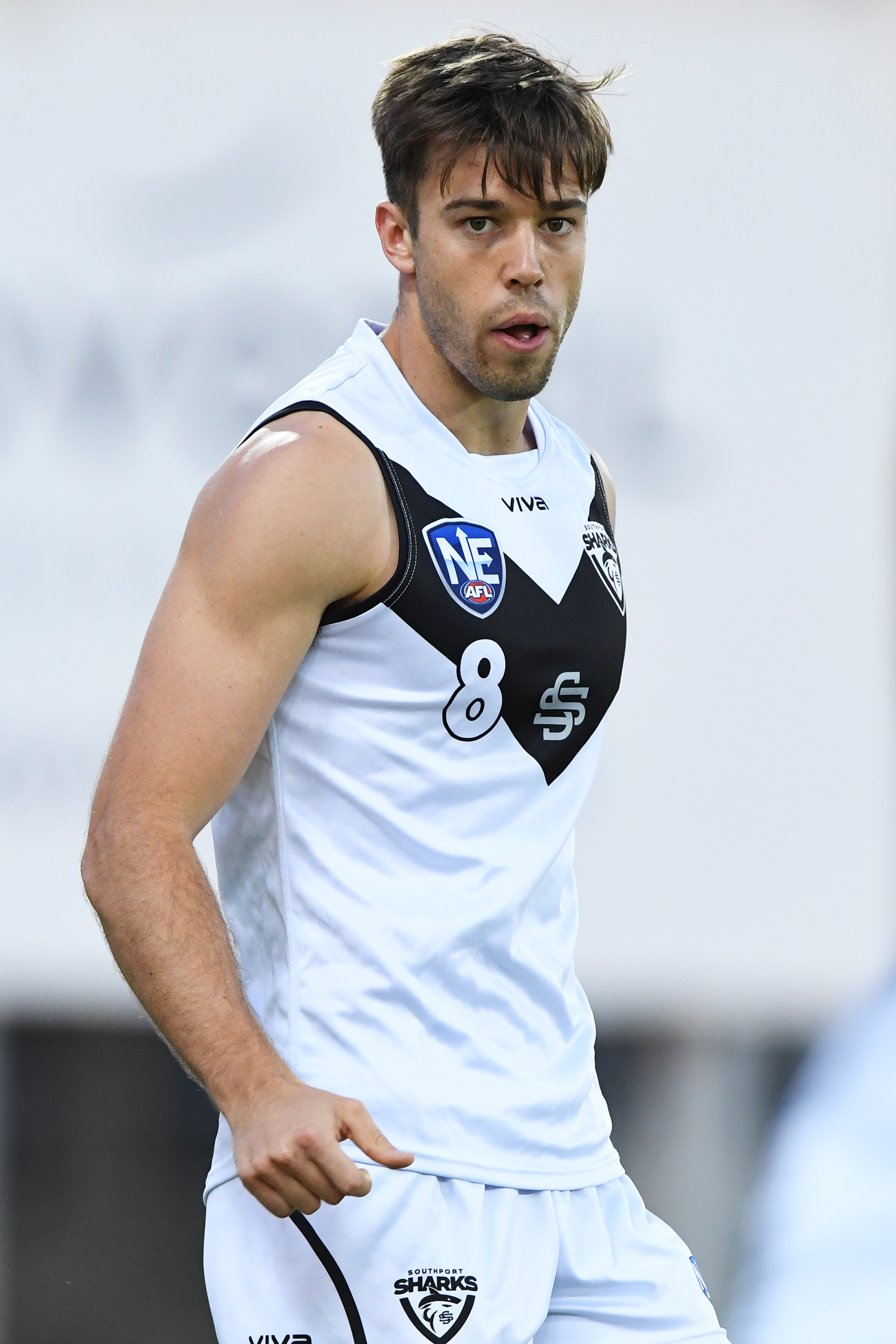
- Tape in August 2018

Personal information
- Full name: Seb Tape
- Born: 6 August 1992 (age 34)
- Original team: Glenelg (SANFL)
- Draft: No. 13, 2010 National Draft, Gold Coast
- Height: 191 cm (6 ft 3 in)
- Weight: 81 kg (179 lb)
- Position: Defender

Playing career^{1}
Years	Club	Games (Goals)
2011–2016	Gold Coast	40 (1)
- ^{1} Playing statistics correct to the end of 2016.

Career highlights
- Inaugural Gold Coast team

Seb Tape (born 6 August 1992) is a former professional Australian rules footballer who played for the Gold Coast Football Club in the Australian Football League (AFL). He was drafted by with pick 13 in the 2010 national draft. He made his debut in Gold Coast's first game, playing against Carlton in round 2 of 2011 season. Tape was a member of the Gold Coast Suns' inaugural squad, starting the game in the back pocket. In this game he collected 11 disposals (9 kicks and 2 handballs), also accumulating 8 marks and 3 tackles. Tape attended Westminster School in Adelaide, where he was School Captain.

== AFL career ==
Tape debuted in round 2 of the 2011 season against Carlton. Tape started in the back pocket in the Gold Coast Suns' inaugural match against Carlton, which resulted in a defeat for the Suns.

Tape played 13 games during the 2011 season and returned to play in the 2012 season.

In Round 1 of the 2012 AFL season, Tape lost his three front teeth in a collision with Crows forward Jason Porplyzia during the second quarter. Tape continued to play without his teeth until half time, where he was subbed off.

In Round 12 of the 2012 season, Tape was involved in a collision with North Melbourne forward Lindsay Thomas. Thomas dived on the ball, colliding with Tape's leg and twisting his knee to the side. Tape's anterior cruciate ligament (ACL) was torn in the incident and he required a full knee reconstruction, forcing him out of the remainder of the 2012 season as well as the 2013 pre season.

On 13 July 2013 Tape made his long-awaited return to the Suns' senior side coming up against Richmond.

Never able to secure a regular game in the side, Tape was delisted at the conclusion of the 2016 season. He remained in south-eastern Queensland and joined the Southport Australian Football Club in the North East Australian Football League as co-captain from 2017 until 2021. He was co-captain of the side's 2018 NEAFL premiership victory.

== Statistics ==
Legend
G	Goals	K	Kicks	D	Disposals	T	Tackles
B	Behinds	H	Handballs	M	Marks

Season	Team	No.	Games	Totals							Averages (per game)						
Season	Team	No.	Games	G	B	K	H	D	M	T	G	B	K	H	D	M	T
2011	Gold Coast	48	13	0	0	58	85	143	41	39	0.0	0.0	4.5	6.5	11.0	3.2	3.0
2012	Gold Coast	48	10	0	0	46	59	105	29	22	0.0	0.0	4.6	5.9	10.5	2.9	2.2
2013	Gold Coast	48	7	1	0	28	39	67	17	27	0.1	0.0	4.0	5.6	9.6	2.4	3.9
2014	Gold Coast	48	3	0	0	10	11	21	2	9	0.0	0.0	3.3	3.7	7.0	0.7	3.0
2015	Gold Coast	48	4	0	0	24	21	45	10	12	0.0	0.0	6.0	5.3	11.3	2.5	3.0
2016	Gold Coast	48	3	0	0	12	29	41	7	15	0.0	0.0	4.0	9.7	13.7	2.3	5.0
Career			40	1	0	178	244	422	106	124	0.0	0.0	4.5	6.1	10.6	2.7	3.1
