= Ryan Davis (Australian footballer) =

Australian rules footballer (born 1989)

- Davis with Adelaide in 2026

Personal information
- Born: 7 June 1989 (age 37); Sydney, Australia
- Original teams: NSW/ACT Rams (Talent League); Willoughby Wildcats (AFL Sydney); North Shore Bombers (AFL Sydney)
- Draft: No. 62, 2008 rookie draft No. 38, 2016 rookie draft
- Debut: Round 8, 2008, West Coast vs. North Melbourne, at Gold Coast Stadium
- Height: 189 cm (6 ft 2 in)
- Weight: 82 kg (181 lb)

Playing career^{1}
Years	Club	Games (Goals)
2008–2009	West Coast	14 (4)
2016–2017	Gold Coast	21 (15)
Total		35 (19)

Coaching career
Years	Club	Games (W–L–D)
2026–	Adelaide (W)	0 (0–0–0)
- ^{1} Playing statistics correct to the end of 2017.

Career highlights
- WAFL premiership player: 2010; NEAFL premiership player: 2018; Swan Medal: 2014; Andrew Ireland Medal: 2018; Simpson Medal: 2015 State of Origin

Ryan Davis (born 7 June 1989) is a former professional Australian rules footballer and the current senior coach of the Adelaide Football Club in the AFL Women's. During his playing career, Davis played for the West Coast Eagles and Gold Coast Suns in the Australian Football League (AFL).

== Career ==
=== Playing ===
He started his senior football career at the North Shore Bombers before catching the eye of West Coast Eagle talent scouts. Signing a scholarship with the club in 2007, Davis had an outstanding year playing first grade for North Shore and the Under 18 NSW state team. After collecting 2nd in the North Shore best and Fairest, best first year player and playing an important part in both a North Shore premiership (in which he won best on ground) and NSW series win Ryan was offered a rookie spot with West Coast for the 2008 season.

Davis made his AFL debut for West Coast at Carrara Stadium versus North Melbourne in Round 8 of the 2008 AFL season and continued to play 11 games in his debut season.

Following his stint at the Eagles, Davis signed for Swan Districts in the West Australian Football League (WAFL) and went on to play in a premiership in 2010 and win a club best and fairest, the Swan Medal in 2014. After six years out of the AFL, he was recruited by Gold Coast in the 2016 rookie draft.

Davis was delisted by Gold Coast at the conclusion of the 2017 season.

=== Coaching ===
Davis was appointed as the inagurual Southport women's coach in 2020, coaching the side to Queensland Football Association Women's premierships in 2020 and 2021. He also coached the side in 2022 (its first year in the QAFL Women's), with Southport losing the grand final to UQ Red Lions by seven points.

He spent two years with Brisbane's AFL Women's (AFLW) team as a midfield coach. The team made consecutive grand finals during Davis' short tenure at the Lions.

In December 2025, Davis was appointed as the head coach of Adelaide's women's team in the AFLW. He became the successor to Matthew Clarke, who coached two premierships at the club.
