= Andrew Boston =

Australian rules footballer

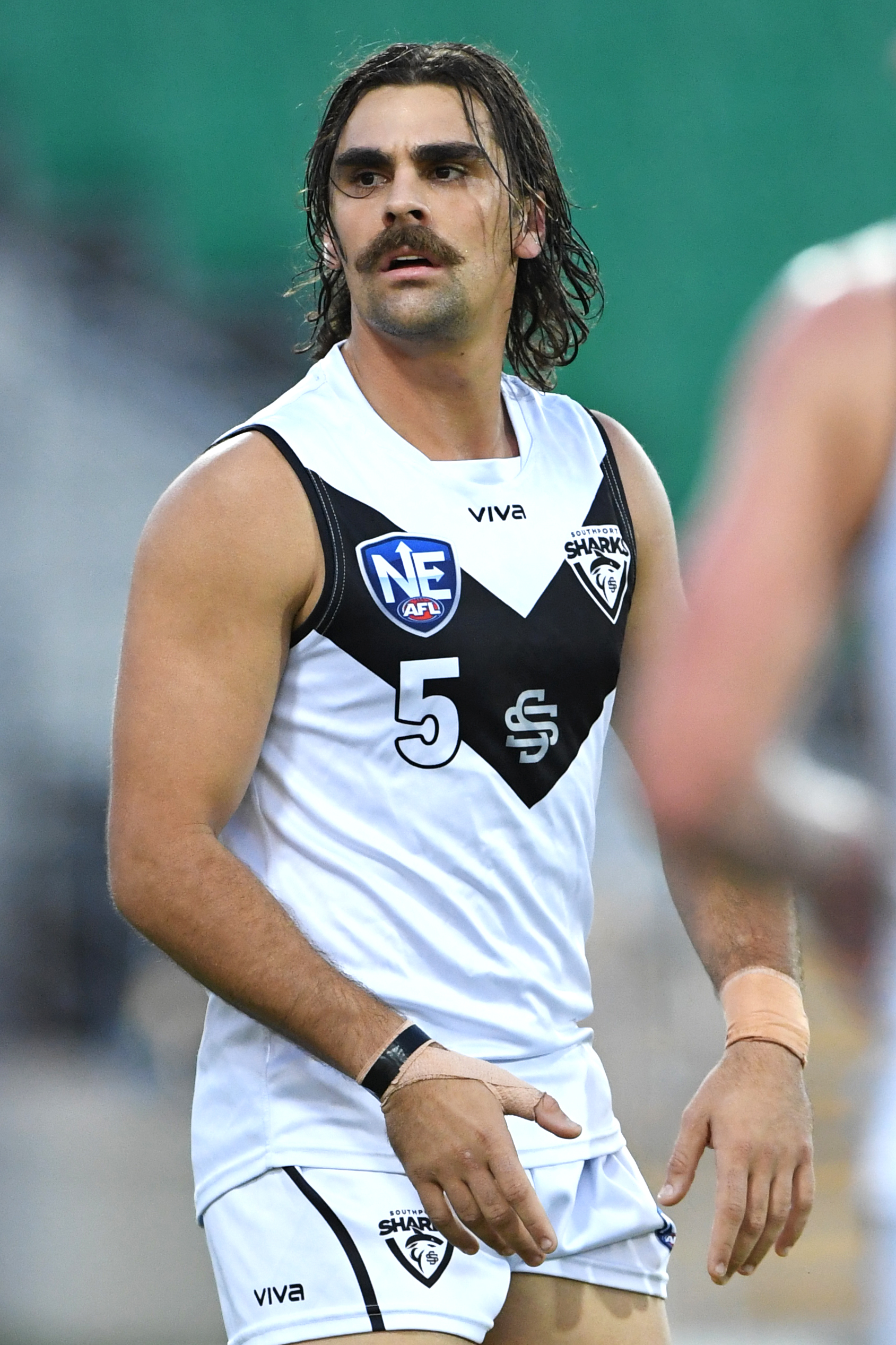
- Boston in August 2018

Personal information
- Full name: Andrew Boston
- Born: 23 March 1994 (age 32); Gold Coast, Queensland, Australia
- Original team: Broadbeach (NEAFL)
- Draft: No. 55, 2013 Rookie Draft, Gold Coast
- Height: 180 cm (5 ft 11 in)
- Weight: 79 kg (174 lb)
- Position: Small forward, Midfielder

Playing career^{1}
Years	Club	Games (Goals)
2013–2015	Gold Coast	16 (10)
- ^{1} Playing statistics correct to the end of 2015.

Andrew Boston (born 23 March 1994) is a former professional Australian rules footballer who played for the Gold Coast Football Club in the Australian Football League (AFL). He was selected with the 55th pick in the 2013 rookie draft.

== Early life ==
Boston was born and raised on the Gold Coast, where he attended Helensvale State High School. His father, Neil, is the former senior coach of the Broadbeach Cats. Boston grew up supporting the West Coast Eagles.

== Junior football ==
Boston played his junior football at the Broadbeach Australian Football Club from the under 14s level. He progressed his way through the junior ranks to solidify a place in the Broadbeach seniors team in 2011. Following graduation from high school, Boston began training six days a week in an attempt to be drafted by an AFL club at the end of the 2012 season. His hard work was rewarded when he was selected to represent Queensland in the 2012 AFL Under 18 Championships. His outstanding performance in the Championships saw him named in the All-Australian team.

Boston was invited to attend the 2012 AFL Combine and became the first player in history to register a perfect score in the goal kicking test. Leading into the 2012 AFL draft, fourteen clubs showed interest in Boston but he was overlooked on the day. However, Boston was rookie drafted as a Gold Coast Suns Academy graduate by the Gold Coast in December.

== AFL career ==
Boston made his AFL debut against Adelaide in round 13 of the 2013 season. He kicked four goals in the last round of the 2013 season to record the best performance of his short career.

He announced his retirement in November 2015, citing he lacked the passion to play at the elite level. He remained in south-eastern Queensland and joined the Southport Australian Football Club in the North East Australian Football League from 2016, and he remains with the club (now competing in the Victorian Football League) as of 2021 as co-captain. He was co-captain of the side's 2018 NEAFL premiership victory.

== Statistics ==
Legend
G	Goals	K	Kicks	D	Disposals	T	Tackles
B	Behinds	H	Handballs	M	Marks

Season	Team	No.	Games	Totals							Averages (per game)							Votes
Season	Team	No.	Games	G	B	K	H	D	M	T	G	B	K	H	D	M	T	Votes
2013	Gold Coast	40	8	7	1	44	24	68	20	9	0.9	0.1	5.5	3.0	8.5	2.5	1.1	0
2014	Gold Coast	40	0	—	—	—	—	—	—	—	—	—	—	—	—	—	—	0
2015	Gold Coast	13	8	3	5	75	22	97	23	19	0.4	0.6	9.4	2.8	12.1	2.9	2.4	0
Career			16	10	6	119	46	165	43	28	0.6	0.4	7.4	2.9	10.3	2.7	1.8	0
