= List of current AFL Women's team squads =

The following is a list of current AFL Women's team squads for the 2026 AFL Women's season.

== Adelaide ==
Adelaide Football Club · AFL Women's personnel
Senior list		Rookie list	Coaching staff
1 Caitlin Gould; 2 Eloise Jones (vc); 3 Grace Egan; 4 Lily Tarlinton; 5 Chloe Bown; 6 Hannah Munyard; 7 Keeley Kustermann; 8 India Rasheed; 9 Hannah Ewings; 10 Ebony Marinoff (c); 11 Sarah Goodwin; 12 Chelsea Biddell; 13 Kiera Mueller; 14 Ava Stewart; 15 Danielle Ponter; 16 Georgia McKee; 17 Maddi Newman	18 Brooke Smith; 20 Grace Kelly; 21 Lucy Waye; 23 Niamh Kelly; 25 Teah Charlton; 27 Alicia Blizard; 28 Brooke Tonon; 30 Juliet Kelly; 31 Alice Tentye; 32 Jess Allan; 33 Olivia Gorman; 39 Sarah Allan; Jemmika Douglas	19 Christina Leuzzi; 22 Kayleigh Cronin; 24 Amy Boyle-Carr	Head coach: Ryan Davis; Assistant coaches: Courtney Cramey (back line); Kieran Strachan (midfield); Marijana Randall (forward line); Emma Sampson (development); Legend: (c) Captain(s); (vc) Vice-captain(s); italics – Inactive; (ret) Retired; Pregnancy; Long-term injury; Updated: 5 August 2026; Source(s): Players, coaches, injuries

== Brisbane ==
Brisbane Lions · AFL Women's personnel
Senior list		Rookie list	Coaching staff
1 Eleanor Hartill; 2 Tahlia Hickie; 3 Breanna Koenen (c); 4 Meg Lappin; 5 Jade Ellenger; 6 Lily Postlethwaite; 7 Lilly Baker; 8 Jennifer Dunne; 9 Orla O'Dwyer; 10 Nat Grider (vc); 11 Shanae Davison; 12 Sophie Conway; 14 Dakota Davidson; 15 Lily-Rose Williamson; 16 Evie Long	17 Belle Dawes (vc); 18 Ally Anderson; 19 Asher Fearn-Wannan; 20 Shannon Campbell; 21 Courtney Hodder; 22 Sophie Peters; 23 Rania Crozier; 24 Claudia Wright; 25 Cathy Svarc; 27 Olivia Lacy; 28 Charlotte Mullins; 29 Ruby Svarc; 30 Marlo Graham; Madison Evans	13 Neasa Dooley; 26 Caitlin Kennedy	Head coach: Craig Starcevich; Assistant coaches: Paul Henriksen (assistant); Phil Lovett (assistant); Jeff White (assistant); Legend: (c) Captain(s); (vc) Vice-captain(s); italics – Inactive; (ret) Retired; Pregnancy; Long-term injury; Updated: 5 August 2026; Source(s): Players, coaches, injuries

== Carlton ==
Carlton Football Club · AFL Women's personnel
Senior list		Rookie list	Coaching staff
1 Amelia Velardo; 2 Lauren Bella; 3 Darcy Vescio; 4 Claudia Whitfort; 5 Abbie McKay (c); 6 Gab Pound; 7 Poppy Scholz; 8 Lily Baxter; 10 Mimi Hill (vc); 11 Yasmin Duursma; 12 Jessica Good; 15 Meg Robertson; 16 Breann Harrington; 17 Dayna Finn; 18 Maddy Guerin; 19 Erone Fitzpatrick; 20 Lily Goss	21 Harriet Cordner; 22 Brooke Boileau; 23 Lila Keck; 24 Brooke Vickers; 25 Keeley Sherar; 26 Tayla McMillan; 30 Kiara Bischa; 33 Lou-Lou Field; 36 Ciara Fitzgerald; 42 Tara Bohanna; 49 Madeline Hendrie; 55 Sophie McKay	13 Aisling Reidy; 14 Siofra O'Connell	Head coach: Mathew Buck; Assistant coaches: Lloyd Perris (back line); Aasta O'Connor (midfield); Jess Dal Pos (forward line); Will Sexton (development); Legend: (c) Captain(s); (vc) Vice-captain(s); italics – Inactive; (ret) Retired; Pregnancy; Long-term injury; Updated: 5 August 2026; Source(s): Players, coaches, injuries

== Collingwood ==
Collingwood Football Club · AFL Women's personnel
Senior list		Rookie list	Coaching staff
1 Sabrina Frederick; 2 Eliza James; 3 Brianna Davey; 4 Imogen Barnett; 6 Jordyn Allen (vc); 7 Sarah Rowe; 8 Brittany Bonnici; 9 Mischa Barwin; 10 Matilda Argus; 11 Ariana Hetherington; 12 Georgia Knight; 14 Mattea Breed; 16 Ash Centra; 18 Ruby Schleicher (c); 20 Charlotte Brewer	21 Amber Schutte; 22 Imogen Trengove; 23 Lauren Butler; 25 Zara Neuwirth; 26 Violet Patterson; 27 Lucille Cronin; 28 Amy Smith; 29 Tarni White; 30 Carly Remmos; 35 Kalinda Howarth; 36 Airlie Runnalls; 37 Josephine Bamford; 43 Jemma Rigoni; Dom Carbone	5 Maisie Nankivell; 19 Ellie Brady; 24 Kellyann Hogan; 33 Olivia Lewis	Head coach: Sam Wright; Assistant coaches: Dom Tyson (senior assistant/back line); Daniel Currie (forward line); Legend: (c) Captain(s); (vc) Vice-captain(s); italics – Inactive; (ret) Retired; Pregnancy; Long-term injury; Updated: 5 August 2026; Source(s): Players, coaches, injuries

== Essendon ==
Essendon Football Club · AFL Women's personnel
Senior list		Coaching staff
1 Emily Gough; 2 Georgia Gee; 3 Daria Bannister; 4 Maddy Prespakis; 5 Georgia Nanscawen; 6 Maddi Gay (vc); 7 Grace Belloni; 8 Bonnie Toogood (c); 9 Brooke Walker; 10 Holly Ridewood; 11 Nalu Brothwell; 12 Bess Keaney; 13 Taya Chambers; 14 Maggie Johnstone; 15 Chloe Adams; 16 Matilda Dyke; 17 Georgia Clarke	18 Sophie Strong; 19 Emma Dineen; 20 Steph Cain; 21 Maggie MacLachlan; 22 Amelia Radford; 23 Amy Gaylor; 24 Sophie Alexander; 25 Alex Morcom; 26 Zoe Prowse; 27 Sophie Van De Heuvel; 28 Mia Busch; 30 Steph Wales; 33 Courtney Murphy; 36 Brooke Brown	Head coach: Natalie Wood; Assistant coaches: Rohan McHugh (back line); Natasha Hardy (midfield); Ben Brown (forward line); Christina Bernardi (development); Legend: (c) Captain(s); (vc) Vice-captain(s); italics – Inactive; (ret) Retired; Pregnancy; Long-term injury; Updated: 5 August 2026; Source(s): Players, coaches, injuries

== Fremantle ==
Fremantle Football Club · AFL Women's personnel
Senior list		Rookie list	Coaching staff
1 Gabby Newton (vc); 2 Kiara Bowers; 3 Emma O'Driscoll; 4 Ange Stannett (c); 5 Sarah Verrier; 6 Madi Scanlon; 7 Aisling McCarthy; 8 Charli Hazelhurst; 9 Gabby O'Sullivan; 10 Áine Tighe; 11 Holly Egan; 12 Mia Anderson; 13 Georgie Brisbane; 14 Orlagh Lally; 15 Evie Parker; 17 Monique Bessen; 18 Lily Johnson; 19 Hayley Miller	20 Noa McNaughton; 21 Mim Strom; 22 Bella Smith; 24 Ashleigh Brazill; 25 Megan Kauffman; 26 Indi Strom; 29 Indiana West; 30 Jessica Low; 32 Laura Pugh; 35 Eden Zanker; 37 Tunisha Kikoak	16 Matilda Banfield; 33 Aoife Healy	Head coach: Lisa Webb; Assistant coaches: Darren Rumble (back line); Cam Shepherd (midfield); Max Duffy (forward line); Zac Strom (ruck); Sam Gelavis (development); Legend: (c) Captain(s); (vc) Vice-captain(s); italics – Inactive; (ret) Retired; Pregnancy; Long-term injury; Updated: 5 August 2026; Source(s): Players, coaches, injuries

== Geelong ==
Geelong Football Club · AFL Women's personnel
Senior list		Rookie list	Coaching staff
1 Mikayla Bowen; 2 Nicola Stevens; 3 Amy McDonald; 5 Jackie Parry; 6 Julia Crockett-Grills; 7 Kate Surman; 8 Zali Friswell; 9 Nina Morrison (c); 10 Georgie Rankin; 11 Evie Cowcher; 13 Sienna Tallariti; 14 Chloe Scheer; 15 Priya Bowering; 16 Chantel Emonson; 17 Jasmin Stewart; 18 Piper Dunlop	20 Alissa Brook; 21 Rebecca Webster (c); 22 Rachel Kearns; 23 Bryde O'Rourke; 24 Chantal Mason; 25 Renee Morgan; 26 Claudia Gunjaca; 27 Emma Kilpatrick; 30 Lexi Gregor; 41 Georgie Prespakis; 45 Aishling Moloney	4 Caitlin Tipping; 12 Kate Kenny; 28 Emma Murray	Head coach: Mick Stinear; Assistant coaches: Elise Coventry (assistant); Ryan Pendlebury (assistant); Sam Simpson (assistant); Legend: (c) Captain(s); (vc) Vice-captain(s); italics – Inactive; (ret) Retired; Pregnancy; Long-term injury; Updated: 5 August 2026; Source(s): Players, coaches, injuries

== Gold Coast ==
Gold Coast Suns · AFL Women's personnel
Senior list		Coaching staff
1 Annabel Kievit; 2 Sunny Lappin; 3 Darcie Davies; 4 Georja Davies; 5 Maddy Brancatisano (vc); 6 Elise Barwick; 7 Katie Lynch; 8 Charlie Rowbottom (vc); 9 Clara Fitzpatrick; 10 Ava Usher; 11 Niamh McLaughlin (c); 12 Havana Harris; 13 Lucy Single (c); 14 Lily Mithen; 15 Alannah Welsh; 16 Mikayla Nurse; 17 Jamie Stanton	18 Georgia Clayden; 19 Mia Salisbury; 20 Daisy D'Arcy; 21 Heidi Talbot; 22 Charlotte Wilson; 23 Sienna McMullen; 24 Dekota Baron; 25 Meara Girvan (vc); 26 Paige Price; 27 Rhianna Ingram; 28 Tara Harrington; 29 Nyalli Milne; 32 Bronte Parker; 33 Ellie Veerhuis; 34 Anne Hatchard; 35 Lily Quigley	Head coach: Rhyce Shaw; Assistant coaches: Sam Iles (senior assistant/midfield); Rory Thompson (back line); Hugh Greenwood (forward line); Selina Priest (development); Legend: (c) Captain(s); (vc) Vice-captain(s); italics – Inactive; (ret) Retired; Pregnancy; Long-term injury; Updated: 5 August 2026; Source(s): Players, coaches, injuries

== Greater Western Sydney ==
Greater Western Sydney Giants · AFL Women's personnel
Senior list		Rookie list	Coaching staff
1 Grace Martin; 2 Alicia Eva; 3 Alyce Parker; 4 Kiera Yerbury; 5 Jessica Doyle; 6 Rebecca Beeson (c); 7 Zarlie Goldsworthy; 8 Eleanor Brown; 9 Sara Howley; 10 Taylah Levy; 11 Caitlin Fletcher; 12 Isabel Huntington; 13 Mikayla Pauga; 14 Kaitlyn Srhoj; 15 Eilish O'Dowd; 16 Scarlett Johnson; 17 Georgia Garnett; 18 Tarni Evans; 19 Sophia Gaukrodger	20 Fleur Davies; 21 Poppy Boltz; 22 Tilly Lucas-Rodd; 23 Madison Brazendale; 25 Cambridge McCormick; 26 Maisy Evans; 28 Daisy Walker; 29 Yasmeen Janschek; 31 Brodie Mowbray; 33 Emily Pease	27 Grace Kós	Head coach: Cam Bernasconi; Assistant coaches: Emma Zielke (forward line); Michael Horne (assistant); Shane Mumford (assistant); Darren Ratten (development); Stephen Camp (development); Rebecca Privitelli (development); Legend: (c) Captain(s); (vc) Vice-captain(s); italics – Inactive; (ret) Retired; Pregnancy; Long-term injury; Updated: 5 August 2026; Source(s): Players, coaches, injuries

== Hawthorn ==
Hawthorn Football Club · AFL Women's personnel
Senior list		Coaching staff
1 Emily Bates (c); 2 Eliza West (vc); 3 Greta Bodey; 4 Najwa Allen; 5 Jasmine Fleming; 6 Hayley McLaughlin; 7 Niamh Martin; 8 Lavinia Cox; 9 Keely Coyne; 10 Kaitlyn Ashmore; 11 Jenna Richardson; 12 Casey Sherriff; 13 Áine McDonagh; 14 Daisy Flockart; 15 Grace Baba; 16 Mikaylah Antony; 17 Mackenzie Eardley; 18 Hannah Looney; 19 Bridie Hipwell	20 Laura Elliot; 21 Elli Symonds; 22 Laura Stone; 23 Jess Vukic; 24 Tamara Smith; 25 Emily Everist; 27 Mikayla Williamson; 28 Poppy Stockwell; 30 Matilda Van Berkel; 31 Lucy Wales; 35 Maya Dear; 38 Jacqui Dupuy	Head coach: Daniel Webster; Assistant coaches: Steph Binder (back line); Cameron Howat (midfield); Ben Cavarra (forward line); Cam McKinlay (assistant midfield); Jake Ireland (development); Phoebe McWilliams (development); Legend: (c) Captain(s); (vc) Vice-captain(s); italics – Inactive; (ret) Retired; Pregnancy; Long-term injury; Updated: 5 August 2026; Source(s): Players, coaches, injuries

== Melbourne ==
Melbourne Football Club · AFL Women's personnel
Senior list		Rookie list	Coaching staff
1 Georgia Campbell; 2 Olivia Purcell; 3 Alyssia Pisano; 4 Paxy Paxman; 5 Tyla Hanks (vc); 6 Alyssa Bannan; 7 Tayla Harris; 8 Sarah Lampard; 9 Georgia Gall; 10 Kate Hore (c); 11 Molly O'Hehir; 12 Ryleigh Wotherspoon; 13 Maeve Chaplin; 14 Amelia Dethridge; 15 Lauren Pearce; 16 Grace Beasley; 17 Tahlia Gillard	18 Chloe Baker-West; 19 Laela Ebert; 20 Maggie Mahony; 21 Lauren Clifton; 22 Eliza McNamara; 23 Sinéad Goldrick; 24 Megan Fitzsimon; 25 Jacinta Hose; 26 Mia Austin; 28 Saraid Taylor; 30 Shelley Heath; 31 Bláithín Mackin; 32 Jordyn Allen	33 Aoife Horisk	Head coach: Tom Wilson; Assistant coaches: Riley Bonner (back line); Vincent Chungue (midfield); Daniel Currie (forward line); Rhiannon Watt (ruck); Legend: (c) Captain(s); (vc) Vice-captain(s); italics – Inactive; (ret) Retired; Pregnancy; Long-term injury; Updated: 5 August 2026; Source(s): Players, coaches, injuries

== North Melbourne ==
North Melbourne Football Club · AFL Women's personnel
Senior list		Coaching staff
1 Kristie-Lee Weston-Turner; 2 Libby Birch; 3 Bella Eddey; 4 Eilish Sheerin; 5 Tess Craven; 6 Alice O'Loughlin; 7 Ash Riddell (vc); 8 Taylah Gatt; 9 Emma Kearney; 10 Blathin Bogue; 11 Eliza Shannon; 12 Nicole Bresnehan; 13 Vikki Wall; 14 Erika O'Shea; 15 Amy Smith; 16 Tahlia Randall; 18 Shauna McElligott; 19 Ruby Tripodi	20 Jasmine Ferguson; 21 Amy Gavin Mangan; 22 Claire Mahony; 23 Mia King; 24 Tessa Boyd; 25 Jasmine Garner (c); 26 Kim Rennie; 28 Abby Favell; 30 Sarah Wall; 33 Kate Shierlaw; 35 Jenna Bruton; 37 Maddison Torpey; 60 Emma King	Head coach: Darren Crocker; Assistant coaches: Rhys Harwood (senior assistant/back line); Daniel McKenzie (forward line); Tahni Nestor (development); Hamish MacInnes (development); Meagan Kiely (development); Legend: (c) Captain(s); (vc) Vice-captain(s); italics – Inactive; (ret) Retired; Pregnancy; Long-term injury; Updated: 5 August 2026; Source(s): Players, coaches, injuries

== Port Adelaide ==
Port Adelaide Football Club · AFL Women's personnel
Senior list		Coaching staff
1 Justine Mules-Robinson (c); 2 Ebony O'Dea; 3 Jasmine Evans; 4 Piper Window; 5 Abbey Dowrick; 6 Molly Brooksby; 7 Ellie Hampson; 8 Ashleigh Woodland; 9 Maria Moloney; 10 Indy Tahau; 11 Caitlin Wendland; 12 Ella Heads; 13 Lucy Boyd; 15 Julia Teakle; 16 Shineah Goody; 17 Ella Boag; 18 Jemma Charity; 19 Olivia Crane	20 Sachi Syme (vc); 21 Amelie Borg (vc); 22 Lauren Young; 23 Sophie Eaton; 27 Gemma Houghton; 28 Cheyenne Hammond; 29 Matilda Scholz; 30 Teagan Germech; 31 Chloe Gaunt; 32 Jasmine Sowden; 35 Kirsty Lamb; 44 Katelyn Pope; Grace Parsons	Head coach: Glenn Strachan; Assistant coaches: Sam Virgo (back line); Aiden Yelland (midfield); Braedon Talbot (forward line); Logan Austin (development); Troy Wilkey (development); Legend: (c) Captain(s); (vc) Vice-captain(s); italics – Inactive; (ret) Retired; Pregnancy; Long-term injury; Updated: 5 August 2026; Source(s): Players, coaches, injuries

== Richmond ==
Richmond Football Club · AFL Women's personnel
Senior list		Rookie list	Coaching staff
2 Emelia Yassir; 3 Katie Brennan; 4 Monique Conti (vc); 5 Paige Scott; 6 Sierra Grieves; 7 Sarah Hosking; 8 Montana Beruldsen; 9 Caitlin Greiser; 10 Montana McKinnon; 11 Isabel Bacon; 12 Olivia Wolmarans; 14 Poppy Kelly; 15 Rebecca Miller; 16 Laura McClelland; 18 Libby Graham; 19 Kate Dempsey	20 Beth Lynch; 21 Dana East; 22 Ellie McKenzie (c); 24 Charli Wicksteed; 26 Ana Mulholland; 27 Georgia Stubs; 28 Gabby Seymour (c); 30 Ally Dallaway; 32 Zoe Hargreaves; 33 Mckenzie Ford; 34 Baia Pugh; 35 Maddie Shevlin; 37 Fina Dethlefsen	13 Aoibhin Cleary	Head coach: Jarrad Donders; Assistant coaches: Brett Gourley (senior assistant/midfield); Tom Chitsos (back line); Brendan Fevola (forward line); Legend: (c) Captain(s); (vc) Vice-captain(s); italics – Inactive; (ret) Retired; Pregnancy; Long-term injury; Updated: 5 August 2026; Source(s): Players, coaches, injuries

== St Kilda ==
St Kilda Football Club · AFL Women's personnel
Senior list		Coaching staff
1 Molly McDonald; 2 Sophie Butterworth; 3 Alice Burke; 4 Jade McLay; 5 Darcy Guttridge; 6 Tyanna Smith (vc); 7 J'Noemi Anderson; 8 Carys D'Addario; 9 Jaimee Lambert; 10 Paige Trudgeon; 11 Zoe Besanko; 12 Serene Watson (c); 13 Maya Louvel-Finn; 14 Hannah Priest; 15 Kyla Forbes; 16 Ella Friend	17 Nicola Barr; 18 Saoirse Lally; 19 Rene Caris; 21 Georgia Patrikios; 22 Ashleigh Richards; 23 Olivia Vesely; 24 Alana Gee; 25 Amber Clarke; 26 Charlotte Baskaran; 27 Nicola Xenos; 30 Jesse Tawhiao-Wardlaw; 32 Abby Hobson; 35 Bianca Jakobsson; 36 Chelsea Sutton; 50 Emmelie Fiedler	Head coach: Nick Dal Santo; Assistant coaches: Matt Skubis (back line); Matt Brewer (midfield); Jack Frost (forward line); Legend: (c) Captain(s); (vc) Vice-captain(s); italics – Inactive; (ret) Retired; Pregnancy; Long-term injury; Updated: 5 August 2026; Source(s): Players, coaches, injuries

== Sydney ==
Sydney Swans · AFL Women's personnel
Senior list		Rookie list	Coaching staff
1 Imogen Brown; 2 Holly Cooper; 3 Taylor Smith; 4 Darcy Moloney; 5 Chloe Molloy; 6 Molly Thomas; 7 Ally Morphett; 8 Alice Mitchell; 9 Lucy McEvoy (c); 10 Cynthia Hamilton (vc); 11 Jasmine Grierson; 12 Lulu Pullar; 13 Caitlin Reid; 14 Alex Neyland; 15 Paris McCarthy; 16 Sarah Grunden; 17 Ashleigh Van Loon	18 Montana Ham; 19 Maddie Quinn; 20 Brenna Tarrant; 21 Amelia Martin; 22 Sarah Steele-Park; 23 Zippy Fish; 24 Julie O'Sullivan; 25 Sofia Hurley (vc); 26 Lara Hausegger; 28 Emma Juneja; 29 Tanya Kennedy; 30 Lexi Hamilton; 31 Laura Gardiner	27 Mary-Kate Lynch	Head coach: Colin O'Riordan; Assistant coaches: Tanya Hetherington (senior assistant/back line); Lachie Hunter (midfield); Brooke Lochland (forward line); Willem Smit (development); Legend: (c) Captain(s); (vc) Vice-captain(s); italics – Inactive; (ret) Retired; Pregnancy; Long-term injury; Updated: 5 August 2026; Source(s): Players, coaches, injuries

== West Coast ==
West Coast Eagles · AFL Women's personnel
Senior list		Coaching staff
1 Lauren Wakfer; 2 Kellie Gibson; 3 Charlie Thomas (c); 4 Ella Roberts; 5 Courtney Rowley; 6 Bella Lewis (c); 7 Jess Rentsch; 8 Lucia Painter; 9 Roxy Roux; 10 Alison Drennan; 11 Mia Russo; 12 Charlotte Riggs; 13 Emma Swanson; 14 Belinda Smith; 15 Abbygail Bushby; 16 Zoe Wakfer; 17 Keeley Skepper; 18 Jaide Britton; 19 Amy Franklin; 20 Sanne Bakker; 21 Mikayla Western (vc)	22 Georgie Cleaver; 23 Sarah Lakay; 24 Ella Slocombe; 25 Sienna Gerardi; 26 Lily Smart; 27 Liz McGrath; 28 Lily Paterson; 29 Natasha Entwistle; 30 Beth Schilling; 32 Kayla Dalgleish; 33 Jovie Skewes-Clinton	Head coach: Daisy Pearce; Assistant coaches: Chad Morrison (back line); Kane Mitchell (midfield); Baker Denneman (stoppages); Darren Harris (forward line); Brett King (ruck); Andrew Di Loreto (development); Tiffany Ferguson-Blight (development); Martene Pearman (development); Legend: (c) Captain(s); (vc) Vice-captain(s); italics – Inactive; (ret) Retired; Pregnancy; Long-term injury; Updated: 5 August 2026; Source(s): Players, coaches, injuries

== Western Bulldogs ==
Western Bulldogs · AFL Women's personnel
Senior list		Coaching staff
1 Sarah Poustie; 2 Ellie Blackburn; 3 Isabella Grant; 4 Isabelle Pritchard (c); 5 Elaine Grigg; 6 Maggie Gorham; 7 Deanna Berry (c); 8 Dominique Carruthers; 9 Emma McDonald; 10 Jasmyn Smith; 11 Elle Bennetts; 12 Brooke Barwick; 13 Charlie O'Connor Moreira; 14 Louise Stephenson; 15 Sarah Hartwig; 16 Amaia Wain; 17 Elisabeth Georgostathis	18 Britney Gutknecht; 19 Heidi Woodley; 20 Cleo Buttifant; 21 Mikala Cann; 22 Mizuki Brothwell; 23 Jess Fitzgerald; 24 Keely Hardingham; 25 Ellie Gavalas; 26 Analee Mckee; 27 Lauren Ahrens; 28 Kaylee Kimber; 32 Mua Laloifi; 33 Alice Edmonds; 37 Rylie Wilcox	Head coach: Tamara Hyett; Assistant coaches: Callum Brown (back line); Andrew Killingsworth (forward line); Ben Friggi (development); Erin Meade (development); Legend: (c) Captain(s); (vc) Vice-captain(s); italics – Inactive; (ret) Retired; Pregnancy; Long-term injury; Updated: 5 August 2026; Source(s): Players, coaches, injuries

== See also ==
- List of current AFL team squads
