= List of AFL Women's debuts in 2026 =

This is a list of players in the AFL Women's (AFLW) who have either made their AFLW debut or played for a new club during the 2026 AFL Women's season.

Statistics are correct to the 27th of October, 2026.

== Summary ==
Summary of debuts in 2026
Club	AFLW debuts	Change of club
Adelaide	7	1
Brisbane	3	0
Carlton	2	4
Collingwood	7	5
Essendon	3	1
Fremantle	4	1
Geelong	4	3
Gold Coast	11	1
Greater Western Sydney	3	3
Hawthorn	2	3
Melbourne	5	2
North Melbourne	2	2
Port Adelaide	3	3
Richmond	5	3
St Kilda	6	2
Sydney	4	1
West Coast	4	3
Western Bulldogs	2	1
Total	77	39

== AFLW debuts ==
Name	Club	Age at debut	Debut round	Games (in 2026)	Goals (in 2026)	Recruiting method	Ref.
Abby Hobson	St Kilda	18 years, 273 days	1	4	0	Pick 42, 2025 national draft	
Jordyn Allen	Melbourne	18 years, 274 days	1	11	0	Pick 16, 2025 national draft	
Lauren Clifton	Melbourne	22 years, 247 days	1	4	0	Pick 9, 2026 pre-season draft	
Annabelle Embelton	Hawthorn	20 years, 250 days	1	11	0	Replacement signing in 2026	
Jacinta Hose	Melbourne	20 years, 343 days	1	2	0	Pick 24, 2023 national draft	
Priya Bowering	Geelong	19 years, 225 days	1	3	0	Pick 27, 2025 national draft	
Evie Cowcher	Geelong	19 years, 12 days	1	10	0	Pick 11, 2025 national draft	
Claire Mahony	North Melbourne	19 years, 359 days	1	9	0	Pick 36, 2024 national draft	
Emma Murray	Geelong	28 years, 110 days	1	11	3	Rookie signing in 2025	
Josie Bamford	Collingwood	19 years, 73 days	1	11	0	Pick 29, 2025 national draft	
Mischa Barwin	Collingwood	18 years, 254 days	1	5	1	Pick 28, 2025 national draft	
Charlotte Brewer	Collingwood	19 years, 274 days	1	6	0	Delisted free agency in 2025; Previously listed with Carlton	
Zara Neuwirth	Collingwood	19 years, 179 days	1	6	0	Pick 48, 2025 national draft	
Baia Pugh	Richmond	19 years, 140 days	1	5	0	Pick 54, 2025 national draft	
Amy Smith	Collingwood	18 years, 281 days	1	1	0	Pick 23, 2025 national draft	
Imogen Trengove	Collingwood	19 years, 112 days	1	11	0	Pick 8, 2025 national draft	
Olivia Wolmarans	Richmond	18 years, 346 days	1	11	16	Pick 1, 2025 national draft	
Dekota Baron	Gold Coast	19 years, 167 days	1	8	6	Pick 15, 2025 national draft	
Georja Davies	Gold Coast	19 years, 210 days	1	11	0	Pick 9, 2025 national draft	
Sunny Lappin	Gold Coast	18 years, 260 days	1	11	8	Pick 4, 2025 national draft	
Mikayla Nurse	Gold Coast	18 years, 330 days	1	9	2	Pick 13, 2025 national draft	
Bronte Parker	Gold Coast	19 years, 208 days	1	10	0	Pick 32, 2025 national draft	
Paige Price	Gold Coast	23 years, 107 days	1	10	0	Replacement signing in 2026; Previously listed with St Kilda	
Lily Quigley	Gold Coast	18 years, 262 days	1	10	4	Pick 1, 2026 pre-season draft	
Heidi Talbot	Gold Coast	19 years, 240 days	1	11	1	Pick 27, 2024 national draft	
Ava Usher	Gold Coast	19 years, 4 days	1	11	11	Pick 7, 2025 national draft	
Amaia Wain	Western Bulldogs	18 years, 349 days	1	2	1	Pick 4, 2026 pre-season draft	
Alannah Welsh	Gold Coast	18 years, 265 days	1	7	8	Pick 12, 2025 national draft	
Nalu Brothwell	Essendon	18 years, 297 days	1	10	2	Pick 50, 2025 national draft	
Marlo Graham	Brisbane	18 years, 274 days	1	7	1	Pick 33, 2025 national draft	
Maggie Johnstone	Essendon	19 years, 71 days	1	7	3	Pick 10, 2025 national draft	
Chloe Bown	Adelaide	18 years, 239 days	1	11	5	Pick 5, 2025 national draft	
Imogen Brown	Sydney	21 years, 166 days	1	11	1	Traded in 2024; Previously listed with Richmond	
Olivia Gorman	Adelaide	18 years, 295 days	1	7	0	Pick 25, 2025 national draft	
Juliet Kelly	Adelaide	19 years, 19 days	1	5	0	Replacement signing in 2026	
Maddie Quinn	Sydney	19 years, 187 days	1	11	1	Pick 18, 2025 national draft	
Olivia Crane	Port Adelaide	19 years, 6 days	1	5	0	Pick 30, 2025 national draft	
Sophie Eaton	Port Adelaide	19 years, 115 days	1	9	0	Pick 17, 2025 national draft	
Aoife Healy	Fremantle	22 years, 183 days	1	10	0	Rookie signing in 2025	
Yasmeen Janschek	Greater Western Sydney	20 years, 180 days	1	11	0	Pick 55, 2025 national draft	
Mia Russo	West Coast	19 years, 10 days	1	7	0	Pick 20, 2025 national draft	
Jovie Skewes-Clinton	West Coast	18 years, 274 days	1	2	1	Pick 36, 2025 national draft	
Kiera Yerbury	Greater Western Sydney	19 years, 23 days	1	8	0	Pick 3, 2025 national draft	
Mizuki Brothwell	Western Bulldogs	18 years, 304 days	2	4	0	Pick 14, 2025 national draft	
Fina Dethlefsen	Richmond	23 years, 28 days	2	8	0	Pick 38, 2025 national draft	
Natasha Entwistle	West Coast	19 years, 307 days	2	3	0	Replacement signing in 2026	
Saoirse Lally	St Kilda	24 years, 189 days	2	6	0	Pick 7, 2026 pre-season draft	
Molly Thomas	Sydney	19 years, 123 days	2	5	0	Pick 47, 2025 national draft	
Jemmika Douglas	Adelaide	20 years, 184 days	2	10	1	Replacement signing in 2026	
Mikayla Antony	Hawthorn	19 years, 48 days	2	9	2	Pick 8, 2026 pre-season draft	
Abby Favell	North Melbourne	24 years, 3 days	3	3	0	Replacement signing in 2026	
Emma Juneja	Sydney	20 years, 113 days	3	8	2	Replacement signing in 2026	
Maya Louvel-Finn	St Kilda	19 years, 190 days	3	8	0	Pick 60, 2025 national draft	
Jade McLay	St Kilda	19 years, 239 days	3	5	5	Pick 26, 2025 national draft	
Holly Egan	Fremantle	20 years, 60 days	3	6	0	Pick 34, 2024 national draft	
Noa McNaughton	Fremantle	19 years, 314 days	3	9	7	Pick 5, 2026 pre-season draft	
Georgia Stubs	Richmond	21 years, 45 days	3	8	2	Traded in 2025; Previously listed with North Melbourne	
Carys D'Addario	St Kilda	19 years, 245 days	4	2	0	Pick 61, 2025 national draft	
Grace Parsons	Port Adelaide	18 years, 269 days	4	4	0	Replacement signing in 2026	
Madison Evans	Brisbane	20 years, 21 days	4	1	0	Replacement signing in 2026	
Asher Fearn-Wannan	Brisbane	18 years, 265 days	4	8	1	Pick 19, 2025 national draft	
Lucy Waye	Adelaide	19 years, 91 days	4	4	1	Pick 21, 2025 national draft	
Renee Morgan	Geelong	19 years, 125 days	4	3	0	Pick 43, 2025 national draft	
Sienna Gerardi	West Coast	18 years, 331 days	5	3	0	Pick 6, 2026 pre-season draft	
Madison Ibrahim	Essendon	19 years, 275 days	5	2	0	Replacement signing in 2026	
Olivia Lewis	Collingwood	27 years, 143 days	6	3	1	Rookie signing in 2025	
Jorja Livingstone	Melbourne	24 years, 230 days	6	5	3	Replacement signing in 2026	
Tayla McMillan	Carlton	19 years, 123 days	7	4	1	Pick 34, 2025 national draft	
Ana Mulholland	Richmond	22 years, 253 days	7	5	1	Rookie signing in 2025	
Rhianna Ingram	Gold Coast	18 years, 342 days	7	5	0	Pick 44, 2025 national draft	
Chelsea Sutton	St Kilda	18 years, 315 days	7	3	0	Pick 31, 2025 national draft	
Alice Tentye	Adelaide	21 years, 24 days	8	4	0	Replacement signing in 2026	
Aoife Horisk	Melbourne	22 years, 306 days	8	4	2	Rookie signing in 2025	
Maisy Evans	Greater Western Sydney	19 years, 345 days	9	3	1	Pick 2, 2026 pre-season draft	
Ava Stewart	Adelaide	18 years, 319 days	9	3	0	Pick 63, 2025 national draft	
Monique Bessen	Fremantle	19 years, 248 days	9	3	0	Pick 40, 2025 national draft	
Lily Baxter	Carlton	19 years, 294 days	11	1	0	Pick 24, 2025 national draft	
Pending
Zoe Hargreaves	Richmond	20 years, 150 days	12	0	0	Pick 20, 2024 national draft	
Ellie Brady	Collingwood	20 years, 132 days	12	0	0	Rookie signing in 2025	

== Change of AFLW club ==
Name	Club	Age at debut	Debut round	Games (in 2026)	Goals (in 2026)	Former clubs	Recruiting method	Ref.
Brooke Boileau	Carlton	21 years, 193 days	1	4	0	Adelaide	Traded in 2025	
Sophie Butterworth	St Kilda	20 years, 241 days	1	8	2	Hawthorn	Traded in 2025	
Nell Morris-Dalton	Carlton	25 years, 126 days	1	11	13	Western Bulldogs & Collingwood	Replacement signing in 2026	
Claudia Whitfort	Carlton	27 years, 9 days	1	11	5	Melbourne, St Kilda & Gold Coast	Traded in 2025	
Mia Austin	Melbourne	22 years, 113 days	1	7	16	Carlton	Traded in 2025	
Jacqui Dupuy	Hawthorn	32 years, 25 days	1	11	7	Gold Coast	Traded in 2025	
Niamh Martin	Hawthorn	25 years, 49 days	1	8	4	North Melbourne	Traded in 2025	
Poppy Stockwell	Hawthorn	22 years, 293 days	1	11	12	Fremantle	Replacement signing in 2026	
Mattea Breed	Collingwood	25 years, 15 days	1	9	1	Hawthorn	Traded in 2024	
Dom Carbone	Collingwood	24 years, 324 days	1	6	2	Hawthorn & Western Bulldogs	Replacement signing in 2026	
Dana East	Richmond	24 years, 66 days	1	11	0	Fremantle	Traded in 2025	
Ariana Hetherington	Collingwood	27 years, 50 days	1	11	1	Fremantle & North Melbourne	Traded in 2025	
Jemma Rigoni	Collingwood	22 years, 72 days	1	10	1	Melbourne	Delisted free agency in 2025	
Mikala Cann	Western Bulldogs	25 years, 284 days	1	11	3	Collingwood	Traded in 2025	
Anne Hatchard	Gold Coast	28 years, 161 days	1	11	8	Adelaide	Traded in 2025	
Zoe Prowse	Essendon	23 years, 43 days	1	7	0	Adelaide	Traded in 2025	
Grace Egan	Adelaide	26 years, 76 days	1	11	6	Carlton & Richmond	Traded in 2025	
Taylor Smith	Sydney	26 years, 184 days	1	9	11	Gold Coast & Brisbane	Traded in 2025	
Emily Elkington	Port Adelaide	21 years, 321 days	1	10	1	West Coast	Replacement signing in 2026	
Eden Zanker	Fremantle	26 years, 278 days	1	11	9	Melbourne	Traded in 2025	
Poppy Boltz	Greater Western Sydney	25 years, 325 days	1	7	0	Brisbane	Traded in 2025	
Tilly Lucas-Rodd	Greater Western Sydney	30 years, 120 days	1	11	0	Carlton, St Kilda & Hawthorn	Traded in 2025	
Isabella Shannon	West Coast	25 years, 47 days	1	10	1	St Kilda	Replacement signing in 2026	
Keeley Skepper	West Coast	22 years, 154 days	1	11	10	Carlton	Traded in 2025	
Ella Slocombe	West Coast	21 years, 65 days	1	6	1	North Melbourne	Traded in 2025	
Maisie Nankivell	Collingwood	26 years, 328 days	2	1	0	Adelaide	Rookie signing in 2025	
Nicola Stevens	Geelong	33 years, 159 days	3	8	0	Collingwood, Carlton & St Kilda	Traded in 2025	
Georgia Clark	Greater Western Sydney	20 years, 268 days	4	4	0	Collingwood	Replacement signing in 2026	
Annie Lee	Geelong	23 years, 9 days	4	8	0	Carlton & Collingwood	Replacement signing in 2026	
Jasmin Stewart	Geelong	27 years, 306 days	4	6	5	Fremantle & Port Adelaide	Delisted free agency in 2025	
Kristie-Lee Weston-Turner	North Melbourne	21 years, 74 days	5	3	1	Western Bulldogs	Pick 37, 2025 national draft	
Lauren Bella	Carlton	26 years, 7 days	6	6	0	Brisbane & Gold Coast	Traded in 2025	
Lucy Boyd	Port Adelaide	19 years, 343 days	6	3	0	West Coast	Traded in 2025	
Ellie Hampson	Port Adelaide	25 years, 229 days	7	5	4	Gold Coast & Brisbane	Traded in 2025	
Zoe Barbakos	St Kilda	22 years, 319 days	7	2	0	Hawthorn	Top-up player in 2026	
Alana Barba	Richmond	25 years, 14 days	9	1	0	Gold Coast & Essendon	Top-up player in 2026	
Caitlin Thorne	Richmond	23 years, 42 days	9	1	0	Geelong	Top-up player in 2026	
Tahlia Fellows	Melbourne	26 years, 316 days	9	2	0	Hawthorn	Replacement signing in 2026	
Maddison Torpey	North Melbourne	21 years, 334 days	10	2	0	Carlton	Traded in 2025	

== See also ==
- List of AFL debuts in 2026
