= List of Fremantle Football Club players =

Fremantle Football Club entered the Australian Football League in 1995, and the women's team entered the AFL Women's league in its inaugural season in 2017. Only players in league games are included in the ordered list; players who were on the Fremantle playing list but only played in pre-season or scratch matches are listed separately at the end of the article.

== Fremantle Football Club players ==
Key
Order	Players are listed in order of debut. When more than one player debuts in the same match, players are listed in jumper number order.
Jumper no.	The guernsey number(s) worn in Fremantle career only.
Debut	Debuts are for AFL regular season and finals series matches only.
Seasons	Includes Fremantle only careers and spans are seasons which they were listed players (senior or rookie list) for Fremantle.
Games	Statistics are for AFL regular season and finals series matches only and are correct to the end of the 2026 season.
Goals	Statistics are for AFL regular season and finals series matches only and are correct to the end of the 2026 season.
^{^}	Currently listed players

=== 1990s ===
Order	Name	Jumper no.	Date of birth (age)	Games	Goals	Debut	Seasons	Age at debut	Notes
1	Ben Allan	7	15 October 1968 (age 58)	47	34	round 1, 1995	1995–1997	26y 168d	Captain 1995–1996, caretaker coach 2001, previously played for Hawthorn
2	Winston Abraham	15	29 September 1974 (age 52)	38	55	round 1, 1995	1995–1997	20y 184d	Later played for North Melbourne
3	Peter Bell	32	1 March 1976 (age 50)	163	130	round 1, 1995	1995, 2001–2008	19y 31d	Captain 2002–2006, Doig Medalist 2001, 2003 and 2004, later played for North Melbourne, before returning to Fremantle
4	Craig Burrows	33	22 October 1973 (age 53)	20	23	round 1, 1995	1995–1997	21y 161d	
5	Matthew Burton	24	19 May 1970 (age 56)	70	32	round 1, 1995	1995–1999	24y 317d	Previously drafted by West Coast, later played for North Melbourne
6	Scott Chisholm	13	28 May 1973 (age 53)	63	25	round 1, 1995	1995–1998	21y 308d	Later played for Melbourne
7	Tony Delaney	30	27 December 1975 (age 50)	28	11	round 1, 1995	1995–1999	19y 95d	Previously played for Essendon, later played for St Kilda
8	Gary Dhurrkay	19	4 March 1974	51	46	round 1, 1995	1995–1998	21y 28d	Later played for North Melbourne, died 21 August 2005 (aged 31)
9	Scott Edwards	1	23 August 1968 (age 58)	15	2	round 1, 1995	1995–1996	26y 221d	
10	Phil Gilbert	6	15 November 1969 (age 57)	14	2	round 1, 1995	1995–1996	25y 137d	Previously played for Melbourne
11	Chris Groom	35	28 August 1973 (age 53)	7	18	round 1, 1995	1995	21y 216d	Previously played for Adelaide, later played for North Melbourne
12	Dale Kickett	11	4 May 1968 (age 58)	135	24	round 1, 1995	1995–2002	26y 332d	Doig Medalist 1997, previously played for Fitzroy, West Coast, St Kilda, and Essendon
13	Brendan Krummel	3	24 June 1972 (age 54)	1	0	round 1, 1995	1995	22y 281d	Previously played for West Coast, later played for Hawthorn
14	Quenton Leach	36	20 August 1972	56	26	round 1, 1995	1995–1998	22y 224d	Died 6 April 2020 (aged 47)
15	Peter Mann	9	7 September 1970 (age 56)	77	88	round 1, 1995	1995–1999	24y 206d	Captain 1997–1998, Doig Medalist 1995, previously played for North Melbourne, Fremantle's leading goalkicker (1995)
16	Jamie Merillo	47, 12	27 November 1972 (age 53)	15	2	round 1, 1995	1995–1997	22y 125d	
17	David Muir	21	17 July 1971 (age 55)	20	2	round 1, 1995	1995–1996	23y 258d	Previously drafted by North Melbourne
18	Jason Norrish	25	26 January 1972 (age 54)	128	23	round 1, 1995	1995–2002	23y 65d	Doig Medalist 1998, previously played for Melbourne
19	Stephen O'Reilly	10	9 November 1972 (age 54)	98	15	round 1, 1995	1995–1999	22y 143d	Doig Medalist 1996, previously played for Geelong, later played for Carlton
20	Todd Ridley	5	11 February 1969 (age 57)	21	16	round 1, 1995	1995–1996	26y 49d	Previously played for Essendon, later played for Hawthorn
21	Scott Watters	2	25 January 1969 (age 57)	26	6	round 1, 1995	1995–1997	26y 66d	Previously played for West Coast and Sydney
22	Travis Edmonds	22	9 February 1971 (age 55)	1	0	round 2, 1995	1995	24y 57d	
23	Anthony Jones	38, 5	19 December 1974 (age 51)	82	3	round 2, 1995	1995–2003	20y 109d	
24	Greg Madigan	48, 17	24 January 1970 (age 56)	26	2	round 2, 1995	1995–1997	25y 73d	Previously played for Hawthorn
25	Andrew McGovern	43	7 April 1968 (age 58)	63	2	round 2, 1995	1995–1999	27y 0d	Previously played for Sydney
26	Peter Miller	49	6 April 1969 (age 57)	16	15	round 2, 1995	1995	26y 1d	
27	Leigh Wardell-Johnson	31	17 March 1970 (age 56)	11	10	round 2, 1995	1995	25y 21d	
28	Andrew Wills	4	3 January 1972 (age 54)	79	78	round 2, 1995	1995–1999	23y 94d	Previously played for Geelong, later played for Western Bulldogs
29	John Hutton	16	26 May 1966 (age 60)	13	27	round 3, 1995	1995	28y 324d	Previously played for Sydney
30	Shane Parker	23	18 February 1973 (age 53)	238	11	round 3, 1995	1995–2007	22y 56d	
31	Jeff White	34	19 February 1977 (age 49)	32	18	round 3, 1995	1995–1997	18y 55d	Later played for Melbourne
32	Shaun McManus	8	9 February 1976 (age 50)	228	95	round 5, 1995	1995–2008	19y 79d	Co-captain 2000–2001
33	Neil Mildenhall	50	8 September 1968 (age 58)	7	2	round 5, 1995	1995	26y 233d	
34	Clinton Wolf	20	18 December 1968 (age 57)	4	0	round 7, 1995	1995	26y 147d	
35	Craig Callaghan	42, 9	9 March 1976 (age 50)	95	69	round 8, 1995	1995–2000	19y 72d	Later played for St Kilda
36	Brendon Retzlaff	12	22 April 1969 (age 57)	6	2	round 8, 1995	1995	26y 28d	Previously played for Brisbane Bears and West Coast
37	Kingsley Hunter	14	27 May 1975 (age 51)	41	86	round 12, 1995	1995–1998	20y 28d	Later played for Western Bulldogs and Hawthorn, two-time Fremantle's leading goalkicker (1996 & 1997)
38	Brad Wira	45, 29, 24	16 March 1972 (age 54)	35	14	round 12, 1995	1995, 1999–2001	23y 100d	Later played for Western Bulldogs, before returning to Fremantle
39	Mark Gale	37, 35	7 May 1976 (age 50)	71	18	round 14, 1995	1995–2000	19y 63d	Later played for St Kilda
40	Jay Burton	27	25 October 1972 (age 54)	2	0	round 16, 1995	1995–1996	22y 271d	
41	Daniel Bandy	44	18 November 1975 (age 51)	105	80	round 19, 1995	1995–2001	19y 267d	Later played for Western Bulldogs
42	Tony Godden	22	19 April 1972 (age 54)	11	6	round 1, 1996	1996–1998	23y 347d	Previously played for West Coast
43	Greg Harding	32, 3	17 September 1976 (age 50)	69	3	round 1, 1996	1996–2000	19y 196d	Later played for West Coast
44	David Hynes	16	31 March 1967 (age 59)	13	4	round 1, 1996	1996–1997	29y 0d	Previously played for West Coast
45	Gavin Mitchell	45	28 December 1972 (age 53)	36	18	round 1, 1996	1996–1997	23y 94d	Later played for St Kilda
46	Brad Rowe	3	23 November 1969 (age 56)	8	7	round 1, 1996	1996	26y 129d	Previously played for Brisbane Bears and Collingwood
47	Clive Waterhouse	26	23 June 1974 (age 52)	106	178	round 3, 1996	1996–2004	21y 296d	Two-time Fremantle's leading goalkicker (1998 & 2000)
48	Michael Brown	18	20 September 1976 (age 50)	22	15	round 4, 1996	1996–1998	19y 213d	
49	Steven Koops	28	24 July 1978 (age 48)	78	49	round 5, 1996	1996–2003	17y 277d	Later played for Western Bulldogs
50	Luke Toia	40, 1	23 November 1977 (age 48)	63	33	round 7, 1996	1995–2003	18y 171d	
51	James Clement	31	4 September 1976 (age 50)	84	38	round 11, 1996	1996–2000	19y 286d	Later played for Collingwood
52	Daniel Parker	41, 5	25 May 1974 (age 52)	25	18	round 14, 1996	1996–1999	22y 43d	
53	Heath Black	21, 7	28 May 1979 (age 47)	138	61	round 4, 1997	1997–2001, 2005–2008	17y 326d	Later played for St Kilda, before returning to Fremantle
54	Matthew Clucas	41	18 March 1978 (age 48)	11	1	round 6, 1997	1997–2000	19y 46d	
55	Trent Carroll	46, 22	28 April 1978 (age 48)	33	1	round 9, 1997	1996–2000	19y 26d	Later played for West Coast
56	Jess Sinclair	40, 15	26 August 1978 (age 48)	50	26	round 10, 1997	1997–2000	18y 280d	Later played for North Melbourne
57	Martin Whitelaw	20	22 May 1976 (age 50)	1	0	round 21, 1997	1996–1998	21y 94d	
58	Chris Bond	32	26 January 1969 (age 57)	41	5	round 1, 1998	1998–1999	29y 62d	Captain 1999, previously played for Carlton and Richmond
59	Brad Dodd	12	23 March 1977 (age 49)	50	24	round 1, 1998	1998–2002	21y 6d	
60	Adrian Fletcher	2	10 October 1969 (age 57)	79	24	round 1, 1998	1998–2001	28y 170d	Co-captain 2000–2001, Doig Medalist 1999, previously played for Geelong, St Kilda, Brisbane Bears and Brisbane Lions
61	Clem Michael	16	16 July 1976 (age 50)	43	11	round 1, 1998	1998–2002	21y 256d	
62	Stuart Anderson	6	27 June 1974 (age 52)	9	3	round 2, 1998	1998–1999	23y 282d	Previously played for North Melbourne
63	Daniel Hargraves	21	24 January 1976 (age 50)	3	0	round 4, 1998	1998–1999	22y 85d	Previously played for Western Bulldogs
64	Brendon Feddema	35	14 May 1974 (age 52)	3	0	round 7, 1998	1996–1998	23y 359d	
65	Brodie Holland	17	3 January 1980 (age 46)	36	37	round 8, 1998	1998–2000	18y 133d	Later played for Collingwood
66	Paul Maher	34, 14	11 June 1976 (age 50)	5	5	round 15, 1998	1998–2000	22y 24d	
67	James Walker	40, 19	15 January 1979 (age 47)	151	16	round 19, 1998	1998–2007	19y 205d	
68	Tony Modra	6	1 March 1969 (age 57)	47	148	round 1, 1999	1999–2001	30y 27d	Previously played for Adelaide, Fremantle's leading goalkicker (1999)
69	Ashley Prescott	36	11 September 1972 (age 54)	38	4	round 1, 1999	1999–2001	26y 198d	Previously played for Richmond
70	Garth Taylor	13	10 July 1980 (age 46)	15	13	round 1, 1999	1999–2000	18y 261d	Later drafted by Richmond
71	Darren Bolton	40	26 November 1976 (age 49)	2	0	round 3, 1999	1999–2000	22y 135d	
72	Andrew Shipp	33	10 July 1979 (age 47)	35	19	round 5, 1999	1999–2002	19y 289d	
73	Michael Clark	39	31 March 1978 (age 48)	1	0	round 11, 1999	1996–1999	21y 74d	Later drafted by Collingwood, played cricket for WA
74	Antoni Grover	46, 14	11 March 1980 (age 46)	202	27	round 21, 1999	1999–2012	19y 163d	
75	Justin Longmuir	20	21 January 1981 (age 45)	139	166	round 22, 1999	1999–2007	18y 220d	Fremantle's leading goalkicker (2001), Later coach of Fremantle
Source: http://afltables.com/afl/stats/alltime/fremantle.html

=== 2000s ===
Order	Name	Jumper no.	Date of birth (age)	Games	Goals	Debut	Seasons	Age at debut	Notes
76	Leigh Brown	30	23 February 1982 (age 44)	63	20	round 1, 2000	2000–2002	18y 17d	Later played for North Melbourne and Collingwood
77	Troy Cook	10	12 August 1976 (age 50)	150	66	round 1, 2000	2000–2007	23y 212d	Doig Medalist 2000, previously played for Sydney
78	Brendon Fewster	18	4 January 1974 (age 52)	37	16	round 1, 2000	2000–2002	26y 67d	Previously played for West Coast
79	Paul Hasleby	4	12 June 1981 (age 45)	208	131	round 1, 2000	2000–2010	18y 273d	AFL Rising Star winner 2000
80	Troy Longmuir	21	25 May 1979 (age 47)	55	36	round 1, 2000	2000–2004	20y 291d	Previously played for Melbourne, later played for Carlton
81	Matthew Pavlich	29	31 December 1981 (age 44)	353	700	round 5, 2000	2000–2016	18y 99d	Captain 2007–2015, Doig Medalist 2002, 2005–2008 and 2011, Club goals kicked record holder, eight-time Fremantle's leading goalkicker
82	Brad Bootsma	40	30 December 1972 (age 53)	23	7	round 8, 2000	2000–2002	27y 123d	
83	Daniel Schell	27	20 January 1980 (age 46)	16	11	round 15, 2000	1999–2001	20y 150d	Later played for Adelaide
84	Ben Cunningham	38	22 November 1981 (age 44)	33	19	round 22, 2000	2000–2004	18y 257d	
85	Matthew Carr	9	29 December 1978 (age 47)	134	64	round 1, 2001	2001–2008	22y 92d	Previously played for St Kilda
86	Dion Woods	34, 6	25 January 1982 (age 44)	59	7	round 1, 2001	2001–2005	19y 65d	
87	Daniel Metropolis	3	17 March 1972 (age 54)	6	2	round 2, 2001	2001–2002	29y 21d	Previously played for West Coast
88	Adam McPhee	17, 9	6 October 1982 (age 44)	81	29	round 9, 2001	2001–2002, 2010–2012	18y 233d	Later played for Essendon, before returning to Fremantle
89	Simon Eastaugh	31	12 June 1973 (age 53)	12	1	round 11, 2001	2001–2002	27y 363d	Previously played for Essendon
90	Robbie Haddrill	42	28 January 1981 (age 45)	58	0	round 15, 2001	2000–2007	20y 167d	
91	Keren Ugle	41	7 July 1979 (age 47)	4	2	round 16, 2001	2001	22y 14d	
92	Dwayne Simpson	13	12 February 1981 (age 45)	2	1	round 20, 2001	2001	20y 188d	
93	Trent Croad	24	9 March 1980 (age 46)	38	60	round 1, 2002	2002–2003	22y 22d	Previously and again later played for Hawthorn
94	Paul Medhurst	34, 6	11 December 1981 (age 44)	99	166	round 1, 2002	2002–2006	20y 110d	Later played for Collingwood, two-time Fremantle's leading goalkicker (2003 & 2004)
95	Graham Polak	27, 12	16 June 1984 (age 42)	73	9	round 1, 2002	2002–2006	17y 288d	Later played for Richmond
96	Andrew Siegert	35	18 January 1982 (age 44)	36	5	round 1, 2002	2001–2005	20y 72d	
97	Jeff Farmer	7, 33	24 June 1977 (age 49)	131	224	round 3, 2002	2002–2008	24y 294d	Previously played for Melbourne
98	Troy Simmonds	2	13 July 1978 (age 48)	64	59	round 3, 2002	2002–2004	23y 275d	Previously played for Melbourne, later played for Richmond
99	Daniel Haines	39	11 April 1981 (age 45)	16	4	round 6, 2002	2001–2006	21y 23d	
100	Andrew Browne	36	14 May 1984 (age 42)	29	6	round 8, 2002	2002–2009	18y 4d	
101	Scott Thornton	22	11 September 1982 (age 44)	88	21	round 8, 2002	2001–2010	19y 249d	
102	Luke McPharlin	15, 18	1 December 1981 (age 44)	244	112	round 12, 2002	2002–2015	20y 197d	Previously played for Hawthorn
103	Roger Hayden	43	9 December 1980 (age 45)	128	14	round 15, 2002	2001–2011	21y 216d	
104	Des Headland	11	21 January 1981 (age 45)	114	125	round 1, 2003	2003–2010	22y 68d	Previously played for Brisbane Lions
105	Aaron Sandilands	31	6 December 1982 (age 43)	271	98	round 1, 2003	2002–2019	20y 114d	Doig Medalist 2009 and 2015
106	Byron Schammer	3	21 June 1985 (age 41)	129	38	round 1, 2003	2003–2011	17y 282d	
107	Luke Webster	37, 1	25 May 1982 (age 44)	33	11	round 14, 2003	2002–2008	21y 41d	
108	Ryley Dunn	5	7 October 1985 (age 41)	8	0	round 1, 2004	2004–2008	18y 172d	
109	Daniel Gilmore	27	2 March 1983 (age 43)	43	9	round 1, 2004	2003–2009	21y 25d	
110	Ryan Murphy	28	24 May 1985 (age 41)	48	50	round 16, 2004	2004–2010	19y 54d	
111	Dylan Smith	13	18 July 1982 (age 44)	10	3	round 18, 2004	2004–2005	22y 13d	Previously played for North Melbourne
112	Steven Dodd	25	20 June 1983 (age 43)	101	7	round 20, 2004	2003–2010	21y 55d	
113	Josh Carr	2	29 April 1980 (age 46)	83	44	round 1, 2005	2005–2008	24y 331d	Previously and again later played for Port Adelaide. Port Adelaide coach 2026–
114	Michael Johnson	37	20 October 1984 (age 42)	244	68	round 4, 2005	2004–2018	20y 179d	
115	David Mundy	16	20 July 1985 (age 41)	375	160	round 6, 2005	2004–2022	19y 284d	Captain 2016, Doig Medalist 2010, Club leading games record holder, AFL top 10 games played.
116	Jarrad Schofield	17	30 January 1975 (age 51)	12	2	round 9, 2005	2005–2006	30y 112d	Previously played for West Coast and Port Adelaide
117	Ryan Crowley	15	5 March 1984 (age 42)	188	116	round 10, 2005	2003–2015	21y 84d	Doig Medalist 2012, later played for Essendon
118	Brett Peake	7	5 July 1983 (age 43)	75	42	round 13, 2005	2004–2009	21y 349d	Later played for St Kilda
119	Paul Duffield	41	5 February 1985 (age 41)	171	33	round 5, 2006	2004–2015	21y 84d	
120	Michael Warren	44	20 March 1982 (age 44)	1	0	round 7, 2006	2004–2006	24y 54d	
121	Adam Campbell	24	25 January 1985 (age 41)	13	13	round 10, 2006	2004–2009	21y 129d	
122	Marcus Drum	30, 9	1 May 1987 (age 39)	22	6	round 13, 2006	2006–2009	19y 61d	Later listed by Geelong
123	Dean Solomon	6	9 January 1980 (age 46)	51	22	round 1, 2007	2007–2009	27y 81d	Previously played for Essendon
124	Chris Tarrant	17, 20	18 September 1980 (age 46)	72	60	round 1, 2007	2007–2010	26y 194d	Previously and again later played for Collingwood
125	Robert Warnock	34	19 January 1987 (age 39)	21	4	round 6, 2007	2006–2008	20y 107d	Later played for Carlton
126	Clayton Collard	13	4 December 1988 (age 37)	1	1	round 9, 2007	2007	18y 172d	Later drafted by Richmond
127	Garrick Ibbotson	35, 5	15 March 1988 (age 38)	177	22	round 11, 2007	2006–2017	19y 87d	
128	Andrew Foster	40, 21	31 August 1985 (age 41)	9	6	round 19, 2007	2007–2009	21y 346d	
129	Brock O'Brien	12	30 May 1988 (age 38)	3	1	round 22, 2007	2007–2010	19y 94d	
130	Mark Johnson	17	23 May 1978 (age 48)	14	8	round 1, 2008	2008	29y 304d	Previously played for Essendon
131	Chris Mayne	23	2 November 1988 (age 38)	172	196	round 2, 2008	2008–2016	19y 148d	Later played for Collingwood, Fremantle's leading goalkicker (2011)
132	Rhys Palmer	10	13 February 1989 (age 37)	53	23	round 2, 2008	2008–2011	19y 45d	AFL Rising Star winner 2008, later played for Greater Western Sydney and Carlton
133	Clayton Hinkley	19	21 February 1989 (age 37)	22	5	round 5, 2008	2008–2011	19y 58d	
134	Kepler Bradley	26	13 November 1985 (age 41)	68	73	round 8, 2008	2008–2014	22y 187d	Previously played for Essendon, Fremantle's leading goalkicker (2011)
135	Josh Head	42	7 April 1983 (age 43)	9	1	round 14, 2008	2002–2003, 2008–2009	25y 83d	
136	Stephen Hill	32	1 May 1990 (age 36)	218	112	round 1, 2009	2009–2021	18y 332d	
137	Nick Suban	8	9 May 1990 (age 36)	156	60	round 1, 2009	2009–2017	18y 324d	
138	Greg Broughton	48, 6	29 September 1986 (age 40)	68	15	round 3, 2009	2009–2012	22y 195d	Later played for Gold Coast
139	Matt de Boer	40, 9	10 March 1990 (age 36)	138	48	round 6, 2009	2009–2016	19y 53d	Later played for Greater Western Sydney
140	Luke Pratt	13	8 October 1989 (age 37)	1	0	round 7, 2009	2008–2009	19y 213d	
141	Clancee Pearce	46	23 October 1990 (age 36)	100	36	round 11, 2009	2009–2016	18y 226d	
142	Michael Walters	38, 10	7 January 1991 (age 35)	239	365	round 11, 2009	2009–2025	18y 150d	Five time Fremantle's leading goalkicker
143	Hayden Ballantyne	17, 1	16 July 1987 (age 39)	171	254	round 13, 2009	2009–2019	21y 346d	Fremantle's leading goalkicker (2014)
144	Zac Clarke	30	28 March 1990 (age 36)	101	46	round 13, 2009	2009–2017	19y 91d	Later played for Essendon
145	Tim Ruffles	35	5 October 1990 (age 36)	5	2	round 15, 2009	2009–2011	18y 279d	
146	Jay van Berlo	47	18 September 1988 (age 38)	32	10	round 17, 2009	2009–2012	20y 310d	
Source: AFLTables

=== 2010s ===
Order	Name	Jumper no.	Date of birth (age)	Games	Goals	Debut	Seasons	Age at debut	Notes
147	Michael Barlow	21	18 December 1987 (age 38)	126	81	round 1, 2010	2010–2016	22y 100d	Later played for Gold Coast
148	Anthony Morabito	2	29 October 1991 (age 35)	26	14	round 1, 2010	2010–2016	18y 150d	
149	Alex Silvagni	36	29 September 1987 (age 39)	53	10	round 1, 2010	2010–2016	22y 180d	Later played for Carlton
150	Nat Fyfe	13, 7	18 September 1991 (age 35)	248	178	round 5, 2010	2010–2025	18y 219d	Doig Medalist 2013, 2014 & 2019, Brownlow Medalist 2015 & 2019, Captain 2017–2022
151	Dylan Roberton	24	21 June 1991 (age 35)	37	5	round 6, 2010	2010–2012	18y 315d	Later played for St Kilda
152	Jesse Crichton	44	18 June 1991 (age 35)	18	3	round 17, 2010	2010–2013	19y 37d	
153	Justin Bollenhagen	27	17 December 1991 (age 34)	4	3	round 18, 2010	2010–2011	18y 227d	
154	Jayden Pitt	4	7 October 1992 (age 34)	10	2	round 1, 2011	2011–2013	18y 170d	
155	Nick Lower	34, 10	23 June 1987 (age 39)	22	9	round 1, 2011	2011–2012	23y 276d	Previously played for Port Adelaide, later played for Western Bulldogs
156	Jack Anthony	22	19 January 1988 (age 38)	8	3	round 8, 2011	2011–2012	23y 116d	Previously played for Collingwood
157	Tendai Mzungu	13	28 February 1986 (age 40)	102	54	round 9, 2011	2011–2016	25y 82d	Later played for Greater Western Sydney
158	Jonathon Griffin	12	14 January 1986 (age 40)	56	29	round 10, 2011	2011–2017	25y 134d	Previously played for Adelaide
159	Ben Bucovaz	33	2 November 1990 (age 36)	2	0	round 13, 2011	2009–2011	20y 229d	
160	Josh Mellington	25	29 December 1992 (age 33)	6	5	round 14, 2011	2011–2013	18y 178d	
161	Peter Faulks	28	24 April 1988 (age 38)	3	0	round 21, 2011	2011–2013	23y 111d	
162	Casey Sibosado	39	13 October 1990 (age 36)	1	1	round 24, 2011	2009–2011	20y 325d	
163	Zac Dawson	3	22 February 1986 (age 40)	89	3	round 1, 2012	2012–2017	26y 38d	Previously played for Hawthorn and St Kilda
164	Lachie Neale	27	24 May 1993 (age 33)	135	67	round 4, 2012	2012–2018	18y 332d	Doig Medalist 2016, 2018, later played for Brisbane Lions and won the 2020/2023 brownlow medals.
165	Lee Spurr	34	27 July 1987 (age 39)	120	5	round 6, 2012	2012–2018	24y 283d	
166	Hayden Crozier	17	24 December 1993 (age 32)	69	44	round 10, 2012	2012–2017	18y 161d	Later played for Western Bulldogs
167	Cameron Sutcliffe	33	23 May 1992 (age 34)	104	18	round 15, 2012	2012–2018	20y 46d	Later played for Port Adelaide
168	Tom Sheridan	11	28 October 1993 (age 33)	81	31	round 23, 2012	2012–2018	18y 309d	Later played for Greater Western Sydney
169	Danyle Pearce	6	7 April 1986 (age 40)	104	51	round 1, 2013	2013–2018	26y 350d	Previously played for Port Adelaide
170	Tanner Smith	22	8 March 1994 (age 32)	4	2	round 4, 2013	2013–2016	19y 43d	
171	Jack Hannath	38	9 July 1991 (age 35)	20	8	round 5, 2013	2013–2016	21y 291d	
172	Matt Taberner	42, 20	17 June 1993 (age 33)	124	173	round 13, 2013	2013–2024	20y 6d	Two-time Fremantle's leading goalkicker (2020 & 2021)
173	Viv Michie	20	23 February 1992 (age 34)	1	0	round 14, 2013	2011–2013	21y 126d	Later played for Melbourne
174	Alex Forster	19	14 July 1993 (age 33)	1	0	round 23, 2013	2012–2013	20y 48d	
175	Craig Moller	40	22 August 1994 (age 32)	1	0	round 23, 2013	2013–2015	19y 9d	Later played basketball for South East Melbourne Phoenix, Sydney Kings and Melbourne United in the NBL
176	Josh Simpson	14	9 February 1994 (age 32)	2	1	round 23, 2013	2013–2014	19y 203d	
177	Colin Sylvia	4	8 November 1985	6	1	round 13, 2014	2014–2015	28y 218d	Previously played for Melbourne, died 28 October 2018 (aged 32)
178	Michael Apeness	35	28 January 1995 (age 31)	12	6	round 16, 2014	2014–2018	19y 158d	
179	Max Duffy	24	11 April 1993 (age 33)	3	3	round 20, 2014	2013–2015	21y 121d	Later played American football as a punter for Kentucky Wildcats
180	Alex Pearce^	25	9 June 1995 (age 31)	162	9	round 6, 2015	2015–	19y 334d	Captain 2023–
181	Lachie Weller	14	23 February 1996 (age 30)	47	17	round 18, 2015	2015–2017	19y 161d	Later played for Gold Coast
182	Ed Langdon	26	1 February 1996 (age 30)	68	33	round 22, 2015	2015–2019	19y 210d	Later played for Melbourne
183	Jacob Ballard	44	26 February 1994 (age 32)	1	0	round 23, 2015	2014–2015	21y 191d	
184	Connor Blakely	19	2 March 1996 (age 30)	78	3	round 23, 2015	2015–2022	19y 187d	
185	Brady Grey	28	20 July 1995 (age 31)	21	11	round 23, 2015	2014–2018	20y 47d	
186	Ethan Hughes	42, 15	7 December 1994 (age 31)	107	6	round 23, 2015	2015–2024	20y 272d	
187	Darcy Tucker	18	23 January 1997 (age 29)	108	35	round 5, 2016	2016–2022	19y 92d	Later played for North Melbourne
188	Sam Collins	40	15 June 1994 (age 32)	14	0	round 10, 2016	2016–2017	21y 348d	Later played for Gold Coast
189	Shane Yarran	41	2 June 1989	6	10	round 18, 2016	2016–2017	27y 53d	Died 20 April 2018 (aged 28)
190	Bradley Hill	9	9 July 1993 (age 33)	54	21	round 1, 2017	2017–2019	23y 260d	Previously played for Hawthorn, Doig Medallist 2017, later played for St Kilda
191	Joel Hamling	21	9 April 1993 (age 33)	68	0	round 1, 2017	2017–2023	23y 351d	Previously drafted by Geelong and played for Western Bulldogs, later played for Sydney
192	Shane Kersten	22	15 March 1993 (age 33)	29	26	round 1, 2017	2017–2019	24y 11d	Previously played for Geelong
193	Cam McCarthy	23	1 April 1995	49	63	round 1, 2017	2017–2020	21y 359d	Previously played for Greater Western Sydney, Fremantle's leading goalkicker (2017), died 9 May 2024 (aged 29)
194	Griffin Logue	2	13 April 1998 (age 28)	63	7	round 3, 2017	2017–2022	18y 360d	Later played for North Melbourne
195	Harley Balic	24	5 January 1997	4	3	round 3, 2017	2016–2017	20y 93d	Later traded to Melbourne, died 9 January 2022 (aged 25)
196	Luke Ryan^	38, 13	6 February 1996 (age 30)	205	3	round 11, 2017	2017–	21y 118d	
197	Brennan Cox^	36	13 August 1998 (age 28)	153	32	round 12, 2017	2017–	18y 301d	
198	Sean Darcy^	4	12 June 1998 (age 28)	134	51	round 14, 2017	2017–	19y 13d	Doig Medalist 2020
199	Josh Deluca	39	11 May 1996 (age 30)	4	2	round 14, 2017	2015–2017	21y 44d	Later played for Carlton
200	Ryan Nyhuis	43	6 September 1996 (age 30)	17	5	round 16, 2017	2016–2019	20y 306d	
201	Harley Bennell	13	2 October 1992 (age 34)	2	3	round 22, 2017	2016–2019	24y 322d	Previously played for Gold Coast, later played for Melbourne
202	Brandon Matera	3	11 March 1992 (age 34)	43	46	round 1, 2018	2018–2020	26y 13d	Previously played for Gold Coast, son of Wally Matera
203	Andrew Brayshaw^	8	8 November 1999 (age 27)	197	65	round 1, 2018	2018–	18y 136d	Son of Mark Brayshaw
204	Nathan Wilson	14	7 January 1993 (age 33)	78	2	round 1, 2018	2018–2023	25y 76d	Previously played for Greater Western Sydney
205	Bailey Banfield	41	26 February 1998 (age 28)	119	66	round 1, 2018	2018–2026	20y 26d	
206	Adam Cerra	5	7 October 1999 (age 27)	76	16	round 2, 2018	2018–2021	18y 176d	Later played for Carlton
207	Mitch Crowden	12	28 April 1999 (age 27)	42	15	round 2, 2018	2018–2022	18y 338d	
208	Taylin Duman	44	18 April 1998 (age 28)	45	1	round 5, 2018	2017–2021	20y 3d	
209	Scott Jones	40	20 May 1995 (age 31)	6	2	round 11, 2018	2018–2019	23y 14d	
210	Stefan Giro	42	10 March 1999 (age 27)	14	4	round 11, 2018	2018–2021	19y 85d	Later played for West Coast
211	Sam Switkowski	39	20 November 1996 (age 30)	131	79	round 21, 2018	2018–2026	21y 265d	
212	Reece Conca	6	12 August 1992 (age 34)	46	2	round 1, 2019	2019–2021	26y 224d	Previously played for Richmond
213	Lachie Schultz	28, 5	30 November 1997 (age 28)	90	101	round 1, 2019	2019–2023	21y 114d	Later played for Collingwood
214	Travis Colyer	33	24 August 1991 (age 35)	59	32	round 1, 2019	2019–2023	27y 212d	Previously played for Essendon
215	Rory Lobb	37	9 February 1993 (age 33)	65	79	round 1, 2019	2019–2022	26y 43d	Previously played for Greater Western Sydney, Later played for Western Bulldogs, Fremantle's leading goalkicker (2022)
216	Jesse Hogan	11, 1	12 February 1995 (age 31)	19	18	round 2, 2019	2019–2020	24y 47d	Previously played for Melbourne, later played for Greater Western Sydney
217	Brett Bewley	34	14 April 1995 (age 31)	25	8	round 10, 2019	2019–2021	24y 42d	
218	Jason Carter	35	11 January 2000 (age 26)	2	0	round 20, 2019	2019–2020	19y 204d	Next Generation Academy
219	Hugh Dixon	17	26 February 1999 (age 27)	1	1	round 23, 2019	2018–2020	20y 180d	Later played for West Coast
Source: AFLTables

=== 2020s ===
Order	Name	Jumper no.	Date of birth (age)	Games	Goals	Debut	Seasons	Age at debut	Notes
220	James Aish	11	8 November 1995 (age 31)	104	10	round 1, 2020	2020–2025	24y 134d	Previously played for Brisbane Lions & Collingwood
221	Sam Sturt	27, 1	12 May 2000 (age 26)	31	43	round 1, 2020	2019–2026	19y 314d	
222	Hayden Young^	26	11 April 2001 (age 25)	107	34	round 2, 2020	2020–	19y 63d	
223	Caleb Serong^	22, 3	9 February 2001 (age 25)	151	48	round 4, 2020	2020–	19y 139d	AFL Rising Star winner 2020
224	Blake Acres	9	7 October 1995 (age 31)	45	8	round 6, 2020	2020–2022	24y 278d	Previously played for St Kilda, Later played for Carlton
225	Michael Frederick^	43, 32	17 May 2000 (age 26)	124	143	round 7, 2020	2020–	20y 63d	
226	Tobe Watson	45	3 December 1997 (age 28)	14	1	round 8, 2020	2019–2021	22y 237d	
227	Liam Henry	31, 23	28 August 2001 (age 25)	43	13	round 13, 2020	2020–	18y 360d	Later played for St Kilda, Next Generation Academy
228	Lloyd Meek	22	22 April 1998 (age 28)	15	3	round 1, 2021	2018–2022	22y 332d	Later played for Hawthorn
229	Heath Chapman^	27, 5	31 January 2002 (age 24)	91	3	round 2, 2021	2021–	19y 56d	
230	Josh Treacy^	35	4 August 2002 (age 24)	107	175	round 4, 2021	2021–	18y 250d	Fremantle's leading goalkicker (2024, 2025)
231	Brandon Walker^	31	17 October 2002 (age 24)	68	2	round 13, 2021	2021–	18y 238d	Next Generation Academy
232	Joel Western	34	12 October 2002 (age 24)	4	0	round 13, 2021	2021–2022	18y 243d	Brother of Mikayla Western, Next Generation Academy
233	Will Brodie	17	23 August 1998 (age 28)	29	7	round 1, 2022	2022–2025	23y 209d	Previously played for Gold Coast, Later played for Port Adelaide
234	Jordan Clark^	6	16 October 2000 (age 26)	121	11	round 1, 2022	2022–	21y 155d	Previously played for Geelong
235	Nathan O'Driscoll	30	17 May 2002 (age 24)	55	20	round 2, 2022	2021–2026	19y 314d	Brother of Emma O'Driscoll, Later traded to Richmond
236	Neil Erasmus^	28	2 December 2003 (age 22)	66	12	round 3, 2022	2022–	18y 122d	
237	Jye Amiss^	24	31 July 2003 (age 23)	97	177	round 6, 2022	2022–	18y 272d	Fremantle's leading goalkicker (2023)
238	Jaeger O'Meara^	2	23 February 1994 (age 32)	63	17	round 1, 2023	2023–	29y 24d	Previously played for Gold Coast & Hawthorn
239	Luke Jackson^	9	29 September 2001 (age 25)	94	92	round 1, 2023	2023–	21y 171d	Previously played for Melbourne
240	Matthew Johnson^	44	16 March 2003 (age 23)	81	15	round 3, 2023	2022–	20y 17d	
241	Corey Wagner^	34	23 March 1997 (age 29)	54	3	round 5, 2023	2023–	26y 22d	Previously played for North Melbourne & Melbourne
242	Josh Corbett	19	23 April 1996 (age 30)	5	3	round 6, 2023	2023–2024	26y 363d	Previously played for Gold Coast
243	Karl Worner^	40, 23	16 June 2002 (age 24)	58	0	round 17, 2023	2022–	21y 23d	
244	Ethan Stanley	46	13 November 2003 (age 23)	2	0	round 19, 2023	2023–2024	19y 254d	
245	Tom Emmett	18	30 November 2001 (age 24)	15	11	round 23, 2023	2023–2024	21y 255d	
246	Jeremy Sharp^	14	13 August 2001 (age 25)	39	15	round 1, 2024	2024–	22y 217d	Previously played for Gold Coast
247	Oscar McDonald^	21	18 March 1996 (age 30)	22	5	round 1, 2024	2024–	27y 365d	Previously played for Melbourne & Carlton
248	Josh Draper^	37	8 February 2004 (age 22)	31	0	round 2, 2024	2023–	20y 44d	Next Generation Academy
249	Cooper Simpson^	29	13 February 2005 (age 21)	5	1	round 7, 2024	2024–	19y 73d	
250	Patrick Voss^	38, 20	29 June 2003 (age 23)	53	93	round 7, 2024	2024–	20y 302d	Previously drafted by Essendon
251	Hugh Davies^	12	28 September 2004 (age 22)	2	0	round 15, 2024	2023–	19y 269d	
252	Liam Reidy	42, 18	14 June 2000 (age 26)	3	0	round 23, 2024	2023–2025	24y 64d	Later played for Carlton
253	Murphy Reid^	16	30 July 2006 (age 20)	49	38	round 1, 2025	2025–	18y 228d	
254	Shai Bolton^	15	8 December 1998 (age 27)	49	53	round 2, 2025	2025–	26y 105d	Son of Darren Bolton, Previously played for Richmond
255	Isaiah Dudley^	43	30 April 2003 (age 23)	43	49	round 3, 2025	2025–	21y 334d	
256	Quinton Narkle	19	3 December 1997 (age 28)	2	1	round 7, 2025	2025	27y 143d	Previously played for Geelong & Port Adelaide
257	Judd McVee ^	17	7 August 2003 (age 23)	24	1	round 1, 2026	2026–	22y 219d	Previously played for Melbourne
258	Chris Scerri ^	45	6 July 2006 (age 20)	9	1	round 2, 2026	2026–	19y 258d	
259	Mason Cox ^	18	14 March 1991 (age 35)	20	7	round 1, 2026	2026–	35y 36d	Previously played for Collingwood
260	Tobyn Murray ^	11	5 May 2005 (age 21)	1	1	round 24, 2026	2026–	21y 109d	
Source: AFLTables

== Fremantle women ==
Order	Name	Jumper no.	Date of birth (age)	Games	Goals	Debut	Seasons	Age at debut	Notes
1	Kara Antonio	15	27 February 1992 (age 34)	47	16	round 1, 2017	2017–2022 (S7)	24y 343d	Captain 2017–2021; 2017 All-Australian; known as Kara Donnellan 2017–2019
2	Kirby Bentley	23	9 May 1986 (age 40)	7	1	round 1, 2017	2017–2018	30y 271d	Later played for Carlton
3	Ashley Sharp	1	11 June 1997 (age 29)	34	25	round 1, 2017	2017–2022 (S7)	19y 238d	2019 Goal of the Year winner; inactive 2022 (S6 & S7) (pregnancy)
4	Brianna Green	3	20 November 1996 (age 30)	3	0	round 1, 2017	2017	20y 76d	Later played for West Coast
5	Lara Filocamo	4	15 September 1990 (age 36)	14	2	round 1, 2017	2017–2018	26y 142d	
6	Tayla Bresland	5	4 February 1996 (age 30)	17	1	round 1, 2017	2017–2020	21y 0d	Later played for West Coast
7	Tiah Toth	6, 33	25 May 1993 (age 33)	24	1	round 1, 2017	2017–2018,2021–2022 (S6)	23y 255d	Daughter of John Haynes (Perth), known as Tiah Haynes 2017–2021
8	Amy Lavell	7	20 February 1987 (age 39)	14	8	round 1, 2017	2017–2018	29y 350d	
9	Taylah Angel	9, 26	15 January 1992 (age 34)	4	0	round 1, 2017	2017	25y 20d	
10	Stacey Barr	10	12 November 1992 (age 34)	12	5	round 1, 2017	2017–2018	24y 84d	
11	Tarnica Golisano	11	21 September 1996 (age 30)	4	0	round 1, 2017	2017	20y 136d	
12	Ebony Antonio	12	18 December 1991 (age 34)	70	38	round 1, 2017	2017–2025	25y 48d	2018 fairest and best winner, 2018 All-Australian, inactive 2025 (pregnancy)
13	Akec Makur Chuot	14	5 September 1992 (age 34)	6	0	round 1, 2017	2017	24y 152d	Later played for Richmond & Hawthorn
14	Demi Okely	16	19 March 1997 (age 29)	7	0	round 1, 2017	2017	19y 322d	
15	Dana Hooker	17	23 January 1991 (age 35)	22	6	round 1, 2017	2017–2019	26y 12d	2017 fairest and best winner, 2018 & 2019 All-Australian; later played for West Coast
16	Belinda Smith	18	1 June 1995 (age 31)	12	0	round 1, 2017	2017–2018	21y 248d	Later played for Western Bulldogs & West Coast
17	Hayley Miller^	19	3 February 1996 (age 30)	104	48	round 1, 2017	2017–	21y 1d	Captain 2022 (S6) – 2023, 2022 (S6) All-Australian (vice-captain)
18	Steph Cain	20	4 June 1996 (age 30)	44	4	round 1, 2017	2017–2022 (S6)	20y 245d	Later played for Essendon
19	Gabby O'Sullivan^	22, 9	21 March 1994 (age 32)	97	39	round 1, 2017	2017–	22y 320d	Daughter of John O'Sullivan (East Fremantle)
20	Melissa Caulfield	24, 29, 10	29 May 1988 (age 38)	20	5	round 1, 2017	2017–2019	28y 251d	Later played for West Coast
21	Gemma Houghton	27	31 December 1993 (age 32)	46	40	round 1, 2017	2017–2022 (S6)	23y 35d	2019 & 2020 All-Australian; sister of Joel Houghton, later played for Port Adelaide, first AFLW player to kick 100 goals.
22	Cassie Davidson	33	6 October 1996 (age 30)	14	0	round 1, 2017	2017–2019	20y 121d	Later played for West Coast
23	Kelly Clinch	25	15 December 1983 (age 42)	6	0	round 2, 2017	2017	33y 59d	
24	Kim Mickle	32	28 December 1984 (age 41)	1	0	round 2, 2017	2017	32y 46d	Olympic javelin thrower
25	Kira Phillips	9, 13	16 May 1995 (age 31)	5	2	round 3, 2017	2017	21y 278d	
26	Beatrice Devlyn	26	8 February 1998 (age 28)	2	0	round 4, 2017	2017–2018	19y 18d	Later played for West Coast
27	Brooke Whyte	38	25 February 1990 (age 36)	4	0	round 4, 2017	2017	27y 1d	
28	Alicia Janz	30	25 May 1990 (age 36)	14	0	round 5, 2017	2017–2019	26y 283d	Later played for West Coast
29	Evie Gooch	8	15 October 1995 (age 31)	23	1	round 1, 2018	2018–2021	22y 111d	Later played for West Coast
30	Alex Williams	9	20 April 1993 (age 33)	13	0	round 1, 2018	2018–2021	24y 288d	Previously played for Greater Western Sydney
31	Jodie White	11	22 September 1980 (age 46)	4	0	round 1, 2018	2018	37y 134d	
32	Leah Mascall	14	23 May 1990 (age 36)	19	0	round 1, 2018	2018–2021	27y 254d	
33	Ashlee Atkins	37	2 April 1993 (age 33)	13	6	round 1, 2018	2018–2019	24y 306d	Later played for West Coast & Gold Coast
34	Lisa Webb	16	27 April 1984 (age 42)	6	2	round 2, 2018	2018	33y 289d	Later coach of Fremantle, wife of Marc Webb
35	Emily McGuire	31	12 January 1999 (age 27)	3	2	round 3, 2018	2018	19y 37d	Niece of John McGuire; later played for West Coast
36	Tayla McAuliffe	25	15 March 1999 (age 27)	3	0	round 5, 2018	2018–2019	18y 353d	
37	Jade de Melo	28	9 February 1993 (age 33)	2	0	round 5, 2018	2018	25y 22d	Later played for Port Adelaide
38	Kellie Gibson	21	9 June 1996 (age 30)	8	8	round 7, 2018	2018–2019	21y 281d	Previously played for Adelaide, later played for West Coast
39	Kiara Bowers^	2	16 November 1991 (age 35)	73	14	round 1, 2019	2017–	27y 79d	2021 AFL Women's best and fairest winner, 2019, 2020, 2021 & 2022 (S7) fairest and best winner, 2019, 2020 & 2021 All-Australian, inactive 2024 (pregnancy)
40	Sabreena Duffy	6	26 March 2000 (age 26)	25	30	round 1, 2019	2019–2022 (S6)	18y 314d	Inactive 2022 (S6) (work commitments), later played for Melbourne
41	Parris Laurie	11	9 December 1994 (age 31)	8	0	round 1, 2019	2019	24y 56d	Later played for West Coast
42	Katie-Jayne Grieve	13	8 March 1997 (age 29)	14	3	round 1, 2019	2019–2021	21y 332d	Previously played for Carlton
43	Philipa Seth	18	19 February 1994 (age 32)	58	3	round 1, 2019	2019–2025	24y 349d	Best first year player (2019)
44	Ange Stannett^	24, 4	15 April 1997 (age 29)	81	13	round 1, 2019	2019–	21y 294d	Captain 2024– ; 2023 fairest and best winner; Inactive 2024 (knee injury)
45	Laura Pugh^	32	1 November 1993 (age 33)	80	3	round 1, 2019	2019–	25y 94d	
46	Brianna Moyes	55	17 March 1991 (age 35)	1	0	round 3, 2019	2019	27y 336d	
47	Courtney Stubbs	4	26 September 1991 (age 35)	1	0	round 4, 2019	2019	27y 150d	Later played for West Coast
48	Matilda Sergeant	23	13 March 1999 (age 27)	19	0	round 5, 2019	2019–2022 (S7)	19y 355d	Later drafted by West Coast
49	Mia-Rae Clifford	4	10 September 1986 (age 40)	3	2	round 1, 2020	2020	33y 152d	Previously played for Geelong
50	Jasmin Stewart	7	4 November 1998 (age 28)	22	6	round 1, 2020	2019–2022 (S6)	21y 97d	Later played for Port Adelaide & Geelong
51	Lindal Rohde	11	21 September 1990 (age 36)	5	0	round 1, 2020	2020	29y 141d	Sister of Drew Rohde (West Perth & Subiaco)
52	Roxanne Roux	17	10 November 2001 (age 25)	37	16	round 1, 2020	2020–2023	18y 91d	Later played for West Coast
53	Mim Strom^	21	7 November 2001 (age 25)	85	4	round 1, 2020	2020–	18y 94d	2024 fairest and best winner; 2024 All-Australian; best first year player (2020); sister of Indi, Zac and Noah Strom (South Fremantle)
54	Janelle Cuthbertson	29	3 September 1990 (age 36)	24	0	round 1, 2020	2020–2022 (S7)	29y 159d	2021 All-Australian, later played for Port Adelaide
55	Kate Flood	44	14 August 1992 (age 34)	7	5	round 1, 2020	2020	27y 179d	
56	Bianca Webb	26	14 September 2001 (age 25)	19	4	round 2, 2020	2020–2022 (S6)	18y 154d	
57	Emma O'Driscoll^	3	22 April 2000 (age 26)	75	1	round 4, 2020	2020–	19y 314d	Sister of Nathan O'Driscoll, 2023 & 2024 All-Australian
58	Sarah Garstone	16	16 December 1999 (age 26)	1	0	round 6, 2020	2020	20y 90d	
59	Sarah Verrier^	5	2 August 2002 (age 24)	74	5	round 1, 2021	2021–	18y 182d	Best first year player (2021), sister of Steven and Brendan Verrier (South Fremantle)
60	Mikayla Hyde	28	12 January 2002 (age 24)	29	8	round 1, 2021	2021–2023	19y 19d	Twin sister of Brianna Hyde (Swan Districts), later played for Collingwood
61	Dana East	8	10 June 2002 (age 24)	49	8	round 1, 2022 (S6)	2022 (S6)–2025	19y 212d	Daughter of Heath East (East Perth), later played for Richmond
62	Áine Tighe^	10	25 July 1992 (age 34)	34	29	round 1, 2022 (S6)	2020–	29y 167d	Inactive 2020, 2021 & 2026 (knee injuries)
63	Makaela Tuhakaraina	13	23 August 2003 (age 23)	17	5	round 1, 2022 (S6)	2022 (S6)–2024	18y 138d	
64	Airlie Runnalls	22	25 June 1998 (age 28)	45	5	round 1, 2022 (S6)	2022 (S6)–2024	23y 197d	later played for Collingwood
65	Ann McMahon	25	1 July 1994 (age 32)	6	1	round 1, 2022 (S6)	2020–2022 (S6)	27y 191d	Inactive 2020 & 2021 (workplace injury)
66	Jessica Low^	30	5 November 1999 (age 27)	66	2	round 1, 2022 (S6)	2022 (S6)–	22y 64d	Best first year player (2022 (S6))
67	Mikayla Morrison	11	1 March 2002 (age 24)	7	3	round 4, 2022 (S6)	2021–2024	19y 337d	Inactive 2023 (knee injury)
68	Amy Franklin	14	4 February 2003 (age 23)	12	6	round 4, 2022 (S6)	2022 (S6)–2022 (S7)	18y 362d	Later played for West Coast
69	Maggie MacLachlan	16	30 August 2002 (age 24)	2	1	round 9, 2022 (S6)	2021–2022 (S6)	19y 187d	Replacement player for Jess Trend (Big Brother), later played for Port Adelaide & Essendon
70	Sarah Wielstra	24	22 June 1995 (age 31)	13	1	round 9, 2022 (S6)	2022 (S6)–2023	26y 256d	
71	Mikayla Western	37	7 January 1998 (age 28)	1	0	round 9, 2022 (S6)	2022 (S6)	24y 57d	Top-up player, due to 5 players being unavailable due to COVID-19 isolation requirements; sister of Joel Western, later played for West Coast
72	Madi Scanlon^	6	8 March 2001 (age 25)	32	0	round 1, 2022 (S7)	2022 (S7)–	21y 173d	
73	Nikki Nield	7	11 December 2000 (age 25)	9	1	round 1, 2022 (S7)	2022 (S7)–2023	21y 260d	Previous played for Adelaide, previously known as Nikki Gore
74	Megan Kauffman^	25	21 March 1997 (age 29)	57	15	round 1, 2022 (S7)	2022 (S7)–	25y 160d	
75	Orlagh Lally^	27, 14	28 July 2001 (age 25)	45	11	round 1, 2022 (S7)	2022 (S7)–	21y 31d	Best first year player (2022 (S7))
76	Amy Mulholland	33	8 June 1993 (age 33)	33	3	round 1, 2022 (S7)	2022 (S7)–2025	29y 81d	
77	Tara Stribley	20, 15	22 March 2004 (age 22)	6	0	round 3, 2022 (S7)	2022 (S7)–2024	18y 171d	
78	Madizen Wilkins	31	1 May 2001 (age 25)	1	0	round 8, 2022 (S7)	2022 (S7)	21y 168d	Top-up player
79	Joanne Cregg	23	1 July 1993 (age 33)	16	0	round 1, 2023	2023–2025	30y 239d	
80	Ari Hetherington	29	26 June 1999 (age 27)	12	1	round 1, 2023	2023–2024	24y 69d	Replacement player for Mikayla Morrison, later played for North Melbourne & Collingwood
81	Jae Flynn	20	4 February 1999 (age 27)	16	0	round 3, 2023	2023–2024	24y 224d	Best first year player (2023)
82	Tahleah Mulder	26	4 December 2001 (age 24)	4	0	round 7, 2023	2023–2024	21y 317d	
83	Serena Gibbs	16	3 June 2000 (age 26)	2	1	round 8, 2023	2023–2024	23y 141d	Previously played for Carlton
84	Gabby Newton^	1	31 August 2000 (age 26)	37	3	round 1, 2024	2024–	23y	Previously played for Western Bulldogs
85	Aisling McCarthy^	7	24 February 1996 (age 30)	34	19	round 1, 2024	2024–	28y 189d	Previously played for Western Bulldogs & West Coast; 2024 All-Australian
86	Ashleigh Brazill	24	29 December 1989 (age 36)	33	1	round 1, 2024	2024–2026	34y 246d	Previously played for Collingwood
87	Tunisha Kikoak^	37	12 May 2005 (age 21)	25	10	round 1, 2024	2024–	19y 111d	Replacement player for Bowers (pregnancy), Best first year player (2024)
88	Gabby Biedenweg-Webster	31	13 January 1998 (age 28)	22	8	round 3, 2024	2024–2025	26y 228d	Replacement player for Stannett (knee), Previously played for Gold Coast
89	Georgie Brisbane^	13	13 December 2006 (age 19)	16	7	round 1, 2025	2025–	18y 247d	
90	Bella Smith^	22	20 September 2001 (age 25)	15	7	round 1, 2025	2025–	23y 331d	Previously played for Collingwood & Sydney
91	Indi Strom^	26	8 October 2004 (age 22)	21	0	round 1, 2025	2025–	20y 313d	Sister of Mim, Zac and Noah Strom (South Fremantle), Best first year player (2025)
92	Indiana West^	29	7 July 2006 (age 20)	22	0	round 3, 2025	2025–	19y 55d	Replacement player for Egan (knee)
93	Holly Ifould	17	2 September 2005 (age 21)	5	0	round 4, 2025	2024–2025	20y 5d	
94	Matilda Banfield^	16	19 May 2005 (age 21)	20	5	round 5, 2025	2025–	20y 118d	Former hockey player, niece of Drew Banfield
95	Poppy Stockwell	20	24 October 2003 (age 23)	2	1	round 6, 2025	2025	21y 331d	Replacement player for Ebony Antonio (pregnancy), later played for Hawthorn
96	Lily Johnson^	18	13 April 2004 (age 22)	6	0	round 1, 2026	2026–	22y 125d	Previously played for Melbourne
97	Aoife Healy^	33	14 February 2004 (age 22)	11	0	round 1, 2026	2026–	22y 183d	
98	Eden Zanker^	35	11 November 1999 (age 27)	12	9	round 1, 2026	2026–	26y 278d	Previously played for Melbourne
99	Holly Egan^	11	1 July 2006 (age 20)	6	0	round 3, 2026	2026–	20y 60d	Sister of Grace Egan
100	Noa McNaughton^	20	20 October 2006 (age 20)	10	9	round 3, 2026	2026–	19y 314d	
101	Monique Bessen^	17	5 February 2007 (age 19)	3	0	round 9, 2026	2026–	19y 248d	
102	Evie Parker^	15	6 July 2006 (age 20)	1	0	round 12, 2026	2026–	20y 118d	
Source: AustralianFootball.com

== Other players ==
=== Listed players yet to play an AFL game for Fremantle men's team ===
Player	Date of birth	Recruited from	Draft details	Senior listed	Rookie listed	WAFL league games	WAFL club	Notes
Dominic Bedendo	9 July 2002 (age 24)	Port Melbourne	2026 Delisted free agent	2027–		0	N/A	Previously played for Western Bulldogs
Jaren Carr	27 January 2004 (age 22)	South Fremantle	Pick 63, 2024 national draft	2025–2026		9 28	South Fremantle Peel Thunder	Son of Matthew Carr
George Dimer	21 June 2008 (age 18)	Sandringham Dragons	2026 national draft	2027–		0	N/A	
Kane Johnston	26 June 2002 (age 24)	Perth	2026 national draft	2027–		55	Perth	
Leon Kickett	5 November 2006 (age 20)	Swan Districts	Pick 8, 2026 rookie draft		2026–	2 8	Swan Districts Peel Thunder	Cousin of Dale and Derek Kickett, Next Generation Academy
Jake Medved	2 June 2008 (age 18)	Sydney Swans Academy	2026 national draft	2027–		0	N/A	
Charlie Nicholls	6 August 2006 (age 20)	Central Districts	Pick 34, 2024 national draft	2025–		30	Peel Thunder	
Aiden Riddle	27 December 2005 (age 20)	Claremont	Pick 7, 2025 rookie draft		2025–	0; 20	Claremont; Peel Thunder	
Adam Sweid	14 September 2007 (age 19)	Calder Cannons	Pick 25, 2025 national draft	2026–		16	Peel Thunder	
Toby Whan	9 May 2007 (age 19)	South Fremantle	2025 Category B rookie selection		2026–	0 17	South Fremantle Peel Thunder	Next Generation Academy
Source: Fremantle Football Club player list and WAFL websites. WAFL games played are as at end of 2026 season.

=== Listed players yet to play an AFLW game for Fremantle women's team ===
Player	Date of birth	Recruited from	Draft details	Senior listed	Rookie listed	Notes
Mia Anderson	6 July 2006 (age 20)	Tasmania Devils Academy	Pick 46, 2025 National draft	2026–		
Charli Hazelhurst	7 February 2007 (age 19)	Norwood	Pick 35, 2025 National draft	2026–		
Source: Fremantle Football Club Squad

=== Delisted players who did not play an AFL game for Fremantle ===
Player	Date of birth	Recruited from	Draft details	Senior listed	Rookie listed	WAFL games	Notes
Roy Benning	14 July 2003	Claremont	Pick 54, 2021 national draft	2022–2023		1 for Peel Thunder 5 for Claremont	Next Generation Academy, (Indigenous, Kununurra)
Rupert Betheras	23 November 1975	East Perth	No. 34, 1997 rookie draft		1997	42 for East Perth	Later played for Collingwood
Adam Butler	4 March 1982	Murray Bushrangers	No. 46, 1999 national draft	2000–2001		18 for South Fremantle	Later played for Carlton reserves and Williamstown in the VFL
Isaiah Butters	16 September 2001	Claremont	2019 Category B rookie selection		2020	0 for Claremont	Member of Fremantle's Next Generation Academy
Darren Capewell	25 October 1969	East Fremantle	Foundation selection, 1994 national draft	1995		44 for East Fremantle 12 for Perth	Member of East Fremantle's 1994 WAFL premiership team
Nathan Carroll	20 October 1980	Claremont	No. 2, 2000 rookie draft		2000	58 for Claremont	Later played for Melbourne
Brad Cassidy	25 July 1976	North Ballarat Rebels	Pre-draft selection, 1994 national draft	1995		3 for South Fremantle	Later played for Fitzroy and Collingwood
Ashley Clancy	17 June 1980	Subiaco	No. 17, 1999 rookie draft	2000–2001	1999	17 for Subiaco and 14 for South Fremantle	Was named as an emergency in round 2, 2000
Ben Colreavy	29 January 1982	Claremont	No. 20, 2003 rookie draft		2003–2004	68 for Claremont 51 for Swan Districts	2010 WAFL premiership player
Brent Connelly	24 February 1989	Gippsland Power	No. 6, 2008 rookie draft		2008–2009	9 for Perth	
Benet Copping	7 October 1986	Sturt	No. 59, 2004 national draft No. 53, 2007 rookie draft	2005–2006	2007	33 for East Perth	Nephew of former Essendon player Stephen Copping
Jack Delean	15 April 2005	South Adelaide (SANFL)	Pick 60, 2023 national draft	2024–2025		28 for Peel Thunder	
Brett Doswell	14 January 1984	NSW/ACT Rams	No. 63, 2002 national draft	2003–2004		15 for South Fremantle	
Greg Edgcumbe	1 May 1984	Eastern Ranges	No. 48, 2002 national draft	2003–2004		26 for Peel	
Ben Edwards	28 May 1976	Claremont	No. 7, 1995 national draft	N/A		15 for Claremont	Drafted and delisted in the 1995/96 offseason. From Aquinas College, Perth
Scott Gooch	4 July 1975	Subiaco	Foundation selection, 1994 national draft No. 49, 1997 rookie draft	1995–1996	1997	42 for Subiaco	
Dean Grainger	29 April 1976	Northern Knights	No. 72, 1994 national draft	N/A		8 for East Perth	Drafted and delisted in the 1994/95 offseason. Later played for Preston Knights
Scott Gumbleton	3 August 1988	Essendon	Trade, 2013 trade period	2014		6 for Peel	Previously played for Essendon
Chris Hall	25 June 1990	Woodville-West Torrens	No. 77, 2008 national draft	2009–2010		20 for East Fremantle	Not to be confused with Chris Hall (born 1982) who played for Port Adelaide, South Adelaide and Subiaco
Douglas Headland	10 March 1977	Perth	No. 42, 1994 national draft	N/A		0	Drafted and delisted in the 1994/95 offseason. From Williams, Western Australia
Joel Houghton	26 November 1991	Perth	No. 36, 2009 national draft	2010–2011		36 for Perth 15 for Swan Districts; 17 for East Perth	Brother of Gemma Houghton
Alex Howson	25 May 1994	East Fremantle	No. 26, 2013 rookie draft		2013	16 WAFL for East Fremantle	
Sean Hurley	2 March 1992	Kildare (Ireland)	No. 48, 2015 rookie draft		2015–2016	15 for Peel Thunder	First player recruited from Ireland
Cameron Jackson	6 August 1975	Guildford Grammar	No. 37, 1998 rookie draft		1998	12 for Peel	Also played professional basketball in the NBL
Troy Johnson	27 July 1977	South Fremantle	No. 32, 1997 national draft	1998		7 for South Fremantle	Previously played for the Brisbane Lions
Odin Jones	20 September 2005	West Perth	Pick 5, 2024 rookie draft		2024–2025	0 for West Perth 6 for Peel Thunder	
Jack Juniper	10 November 1986	Glenelg	No. 24, 2005 rookie draft		2005–2006	26 for Perth	
Max Knobel	27 June 2004	Gippsland Power	Pick 42, 2022 national draft	2023–2024		7 for Peel Thunder	Son of Trent Knobel, Later recruited by Gold Coast
Joseph Krieger	13 December 1986	Sandringham Dragons	No. 8, 2005 rookie draft		2005–2006	8 for Swan Districts	
Sebit Kuek	11 November 2000	East Perth	Pick 15, 2022 mid-season rookie draft		2022–2024	30 for Peel Thunder	
Antony Ljubic	23 March 1976	Gippsland Power	Pre-draft selection, 1994 national draft	1995		1 for South Fremantle	
Ryda Luke	19 September 2007 (age 19)	South Fremantle	2025 Category B rookie selection		2026	0 for South Fremantle 0 for Peel Thunder	Great grandson of Sir Douglas Nicholls
Sam McFarlane	5 December 1975	Subiaco	No. 73, 1994 national draft	N/A		60 for Subiaco	Drafted and delisted in the 1994/95 offseason. Later played for North Melbourne
Sam Menegola	7 March 1992	East Fremantle	No. 44, 2012 rookie draft		2012–2014	21 for East Fremantle 14 for Peel; 14 for Subiaco	Previously on Hawthorn's list, later played for Geelong
Todd Menegola	25 December 1967	Swan Districts	Zone selection, 1994 national draft	1995		66 for Swan Districts	Previously played for Richmond
Gavin Milentis	12 January 1976	Claremont	No. 64, 1997 rookie draft		1997	32 for Claremont 3 for Subiaco	
Ricky Mott	21 April 1981	Sydney	No. 4, 2003 rookie draft		2003	51 for South Fremantle	Previously played for Sydney, later played for Carlton
Calib Mourish	8 July 1988	Towns Football Club, Geraldton	No. 77, 2006 AFL draft No. 37, 2008 rookie draft	2007	2008	25 for East Fremantle	Attended the Clontarf Academy in Geraldton.
Nathan Mourish	6 April 1974	Perth	Pre-draft selection, 1994 national draft	1995		88 for Perth and 25 for Peel	
Ollie Murphy	16 September 2005 (age 21)	Sandringham Dragons	Pick 41, 2023 national draft	2024–2026		32 for Peel Thunder	
John Neesham	18 January 1979	East Fremantle	No. 53, 1998 rookie draft		1998	7 for East Fremantle	Nephew of coach Gerard Neesham
Craig Nettelbeck	26 May 1972	Sydney Swans	Pre-draft selection, 1994 national draft	1995		9 for East Perth	Also played for Sydney and Melbourne
Luke Newick	8 July 1981	Subiaco	No. 34, 2000 rookie draft		2000	150 for Subiaco	4-time WAFL premiership player (2004, 2006, 2007, 2008)
Tom North	14 February 1999	Eastern Ranges	No. 65, 2017 national draft No. 20, 2020 rookie draft	2018–2020		28 for Peel Thunder 37 for East Perth	
Dillon O'Reilly	2 June 2000	East Fremantle	No. 11, 2019 mid-season draft		2019–2020	46 for East Fremantle 5 for Peel Thunder	Son of Stephen O'Reilly
Jarvis Pina	30 October 2000	Peel Thunder	No. 6, 2020 rookie draft		2020	15 for Peel Thunder 54 for Swan Districts	
Troy Polak	23 November 1972	North Melbourne	Traded, 1994 national draft	N/A		35 for Perth	Traded and delisted in the 1994/95 offseason. Previously drafted by North Melbourne with pick 60 in 1993 AFL draft. Older brother of Graham Polak
Matthew Richter	25 February 1976	Claremont	No. 19, 1997 rookie draft		1997	17 for Claremont	
Gavin Roberts	13 March 1991	Norwood	No. 20, 2011 rookie draft		2011–2012	1 for Perth	
Darren Rumble	20 September 1984	Subiaco	No. 42, 2007 rookie draft		2007	229 for Subiaco	6-time WAFL premiership player (2004, 2006, 2007, 2008, 2014, 2015)
Haiden Schloithe	20 June 1993	South Fremantle	No. 26, 2012 rookie draft		2012–2013	148 for South Fremantle	2017 Sandover Medallist
Hamish Shepheard	28 October 1990	East Perth	No. 34, 2009 rookie draft		2009–2011	43 for East Perth 22 for Subiaco	
Andrew Smith	5 February 1980	Subiaco	No. 45, 1999 rookie draft		1999–2000	8 for South Fremantle 36 for Subiaco; 71 for Perth	
Chris Smith	18 March 1988	Mt Gravatt	No. 13, 2007 rookie draft		2007–2008	27 for Swan Districts	First player to be drafted to Fremantle from Queensland
Ryan Smith	21 February 1972	West Perth	No. 56, 1994 national draft	1995		40 for West Perth	
Toby Stribling	13 March 1987	North Adelaide	No. 67, 2004 national draft No. 13, 2006 rookie draft	2005	2006	23 for East Fremantle	
Luke Strnadica	1 January 1998	East Fremantle	No. 21, 2017 rookie draft		2017–2018	29 for Peel Thunder 15 for East Fremantle	Later played for West Coast
Leno Thomas	12 May 2001	Claremont	2019 Category B rookie selections		2020–2021	0 for Claremont 3 forPeel Thunder	Next Generation Academy selection
Matt Uebergang	6 January 1995	Redland	No. 16, 2016 rookie draft		2016–2017	12 for Peel Thunder	2015 NEAFL Rising Star winner, 2016 WAFL premiership player
Luke Valente	8 May 2000	Norwood	No. 32, 2018 national draft	2019–2021		16 for Peel Thunder	
Tom Vandeleur	20 March 1995	South Fremantle	No. 32, 2014 rookie draft		2014–2015	16 for South Fremantle 34 for Peel Thunder	
Cameron Venables	29 October 1975	Subiaco	No. 4, 1997 rookie draft		1997	20 for Subiaco 38 for Claremont	Later played for Collingwood
Dale Walkingshaw	30 April 1978	Peel	No. 49, 2000 rookie draft		2000	7 for South Fremantle 43 for Peel	
Conrad Williams	30 November 2004	Claremont	2022 Category B rookie selection		2023–2024	5 for Peel Thunder	Next Generation Academy, (Indigenous, Kununurra)
Jordan Wilson-King	31 October 1993	North Adelaide/Darwin	No. 61, 2012 rookie draft		2012	9 for South Fremantle	Also known as Jordan King-Wilson and Jordan Wilson
Michael Wood	15 July 1994	Subiaco	No. 16, 2014 rookie draft		2014	28 for Subiaco 13 for Peel Thunder	

=== Delisted players who did not play an AFLW game for Fremantle ===
Player	Date of birth	Recruited from	Draft details	Senior listed	Rookie listed	Notes
Emily Bonser	27 October 1995	Swan Districts (WAWFL)	Free agent 2016	2017		Later played for West Coast
Ebony Dowson	6 February 1990	Peel Thunderbirds (WAWFL)	2018 draft selection	2019		
Emmelie Fiedler	5 April 2002	East Fremantle (WAWFL)	Pick 7, 2023 supplementary Draft	2023		Later played for St Kilda
Taryn Priestly	22 September 1989	Swan Districts (WAWFL)	Free agent 2016	2017		
Tahlia Read	6 March 2004	Calder Cannons (NAB League Girls)	Pick 85, 2022 Draft	2022 S7		Later traded to Carlton
Tarnee Tester	23 January 1993 (age 33)	West Coast/Subiaco (WAWFL)	2020 Free agent	2021		Previously played for West Coast
Jess Trend	1 July 1991 (age 35)	North Melbourne	2020 Trade	2021 (Inactive)		Previously played for North Melbourne

== See also ==
- Category of Fremantle players, ordered alphabetically
- Fremantle Football Club drafting and trading history
