= 2025 AFL Women's draft =

Eleventh AFL Women's (AFLW) draft

General information
- Date: 15 December 2025
- Time: 7:00 pm AEDT
- Location: Marvel Stadium
- Network: Fox Footy
- Sponsored by: Telstra

Overview
- League: AFL Women's
- First selection: Olivia Wolmarans (Richmond)

The 2025 AFL Women's draft was the annual draft that enabled the 18 clubs in the AFL Women's (AFLW) competition to recruit players following the 2025 AFL Women's season. It was held on 15 December 2025 during the 2025–26 AFL Women's player movement period.

== Background ==
In April 2025, the Australian Football League (AFL) announced the dates of the AFL and AFLW player movement periods and drafts. In August, the league announced the invite list for the draft and state combines; the main draft combine was held in Melbourne from 1 to 3 October, with the top ten results for each test announced on 6 October. In December, the AFL announced that a pre-season draft would take place for the first time early in 2026, with the mechanism intended to make up for majority of the inactive and replacement player signings that usually occur leading into an AFL Women's season.

== National draft ==
The national draft was held on 15 December 2025, with the draft order finalised at the conclusion of the trade period.

A	Academy selection
FD	Father–daughter selection

Rd.	Pick	Player	Club	Recruited from		Notes
Rd.	Pick	Player	Club	Club	League	Notes
1	1	Olivia Wolmarans	Richmond	Subiaco	WAFL Women's	Received from Gold Coast
1	2	Scarlett Johnson	Greater Western Sydney	Northern Knights	Talent League Girls	
1	3	Kiera Yerbury	Greater Western Sydney	Sydney Academy	Talent League Girls	Received from AFL as part of assistance package
1	4	Sunny Lappin (A (Note: Matched a bid from Adelaide))	Gold Coast	Gold Coast Academy	Talent League Girls	Received from Carlton; originally from North Melbourne
1	5	Chloe Bown	Adelaide	Oakleigh Chargers	Talent League Girls	Received from Gold Coast; originally from Richmond
1	6	Alex Neyland (A (Note: Matched a bid from Collingwood))	Sydney	Sydney Academy	Talent League Girls	Received from Brisbane
1	7	Ava Usher (A (Note: Matched a bid from Collingwood))	Gold Coast	Gold Coast Academy	Talent League Girls	
1	8	Imogen Trengove	Collingwood	Woodville-West Torrens	SANFL Women's	
1	9	Georja Davies (A (Note: Matched a bid from Essendon))	Gold Coast	Gold Coast Academy	Talent League Girls	Received from Adelaide; originally from Greater Western Sydney
1	10	Maggie Johnstone	Essendon	Greater Western Victoria Rebels	Talent League Girls	
1	11	Evie Cowcher	Geelong	Peel Thunder	WAFL Women's	
1	12	Alannah Welsh (A (Note: Matched a bid from the Western Bulldogs))	Gold Coast	Gold Coast Academy	Talent League Girls	Received from Richmond
1	13	Mikayla Nurse (A (Note: Matched a bid from the Western Bulldogs))	Gold Coast	Gold Coast Academy	Talent League Girls	Received from Collingwood
1	14	Mizuki Brothwell	Western Bulldogs	Dandenong Stingrays	Talent League Girls	
1	15	Dekota Baron (A (Note: Matched a bid from Melbourne))	Gold Coast	Gold Coast Academy	Talent League Girls	Received from Melbourne; originally from Fremantle
1	16	Jordyn Allen	Melbourne	Eastern Ranges	Talent League Girls	Received from Fremantle
1	17	Sophie Eaton	Port Adelaide	Central District	SANFL Women's	
1	18	Maddie Quinn (A (Note: Matched a bid from Brisbane))	Sydney	Sydney Academy	Talent League Girls	Received from Brisbane; originally from Port Adelaide
1	19	Asher Fearn-Wannan	Brisbane	Eastern Ranges	Talent League Girls	Received from Sydney
1	20	Mia Russo	West Coast	West Perth	WAFL Women's	
1	21	Lucy Waye	Adelaide	West Adelaide	SANFL Women's	Received from Essendon; originally from St Kilda
1	22	Chloe Baker-West	Melbourne	Calder Cannons	Talent League Girls	Received from Gold Coast; originally from Adelaide
1	23	Amy Smith	Collingwood	Sandringham Dragons	Talent League Girls	Received from Brisbane; originally from Hawthorn
1	24	Lily Baxter	Carlton	South Adelaide	SANFL Women's	
1	25	Olivia Gorman	Adelaide	Northern Knights	Talent League Girls	Received from Brisbane; previously from Collingwood; previously from Gold Coast; originally from Melbourne
2	26	Jade McLay	St Kilda	Calder Cannons	Talent League Girls	Received from Essendon
2	27	Priya Bowering	Geelong	Tasmania Devils	Talent League Girls	
2	28	Mischa Barwin	Collingwood	Tasmania Devils	Talent League Girls	Received from Western Bulldogs
2	29	Josephine Bamford	Collingwood	Eastern Ranges	Talent League Girls	Received from Brisbane; originally from Sydney
2	30	Olivia Crane	Port Adelaide	Subiaco	WAFL Women's	Received from West Coast
2	31	Chelsea Sutton	St Kilda	Gippsland Power	Talent League Girls	
2	32	Bronte Parker (A)	Gold Coast	Gold Coast Academy	Talent League Girls	Received from Adelaide
2	33	Marlo Graham	Brisbane	Northern Knights	Talent League Girls	Received from Hawthorn
2	34	Tayla McMillan	Carlton	Eastern Ranges	Talent League Girls	
2	35	Charli Hazelhurst	Fremantle	Norwood	SANFL Women's	Received from Melbourne
2	36	Jovie Skewes-Clinton	West Coast	Greater Western Victoria Rebels	Talent League Girls	Received from Port Adelaide; originally from Brisbane
2	37	Kristie-Lee Weston-Turner	North Melbourne	Western Bulldogs	AFL Women's	
3	38	Fina Dethlefsen	Richmond	Perth	WAFL Women's	Received from Adelaide; originally from Gold Coast
3	39	Alicia Blizard	Adelaide	East Fremantle	WAFL Women's	Received from Greater Western Sydney
3	40	Monique Bessen	Fremantle	Sturt	SANFL Women's	Received from Richmond
3	41	Matilda Argus	Collingwood	Dandenong Stingrays	Talent League Girls	
3	42	Abby Hobson	St Kilda	Gippsland Power	Talent League Girls	Received from Essendon
3	43	Renee Morgan	Geelong	South Fremantle	WAFL Women's	
3	44	Rhianna Ingram (A (Note: Matched a bid from the Western Bulldogs))	Gold Coast	Gold Coast Academy	Talent League Girls	
3	45	Charlie O'Connor Moreira	Western Bulldogs	Western Jets	Talent League Girls	
3	46	Mia Anderson	Fremantle	Tasmania Devils	Talent League Girls	
3	47	Molly Thomas (A)	Sydney	Sydney Academy	Talent League Girls	Received from Brisbane; originally from Port Adelaide
3	48	Zara Neuwirth	Collingwood	Oakleigh Chargers	Talent League Girls	Received from Brisbane; originally from Sydney
3	49	Shauna McElligott	North Melbourne	Calder Cannons	Talent League Girls	Received from West Coast
3	50	Nalu Brothwell	Essendon	Dandenong Stingrays	Talent League Girls	Received from St Kilda
3	51	Hannah Looney	Hawthorn	Cork	All-Ireland SLFC	
3	52	Olivia Lacy	Brisbane	Bendigo Pioneers	Talent League Girls	
3	53	Sarah Wall	North Melbourne	Meath	All-Ireland SLFC	
4	54	Baia Pugh	Richmond	Gippsland Power	Talent League Girls	Received from Gold Coast
4	55	Yasmeen Janschek (A)	Greater Western Sydney	Greater Western Sydney Academy	Talent League Girls	
4	56	Pass	Sydney	—		
4	57	Maya Dear (FD (Note: Daughter of Paul))	Hawthorn	Sandringham Sabres	NBL1 South	Received from St Kilda
4	58	Pass	Hawthorn	—		
4	59	Meg Lappin (FD (Note: Daughter of Nigel))	Brisbane	Geelong Falcons	Talent League Girls	
5	60	Maya Louvel-Finn	St Kilda	East Fremantle	WAFL Women's	
5	61	Carys D'Addario	St Kilda	Swan Districts	WAFL Women's	Received from Hawthorn
6	62	Pass	Gold Coast	—		
6	63	Ava Stewart	Adelaide	Swan Districts	WAFL Women's	

== Rookie signings ==
Player	Club	Date	Other/former sport(s)	Ref.
Olivia Lewis	Collingwood	12 November 2025	Netball	
Maisie Nankivell	Collingwood	12 November 2025	Netball (Note: Nankivell played in the AFLW for Adelaide from 2019 to 2020.)	
Ellie Brady	Collingwood	8 December 2025	Gaelic football	
Aoife Horisk	Melbourne	9 December 2025	Gaelic football	
Emma Murray	Geelong	9 December 2025	Gaelic football	
Aoife Healy	Fremantle	9 December 2025	Gaelic football, camogie	
Caitlin Kennedy	Brisbane	17 December 2025	Gaelic football	

== Pre-season draft ==
2026 AFL Women's pre-season draft

General information
- Date: 4 May 2026
- Time: 7:00 pm AEST
- Sponsored by: Telstra

Overview
- League: AFL Women's
- First selection: Lily Quigley (Gold Coast)

The pre-season draft was held on 4 May 2026.

Pick	Player	Club	Recruited from		Notes
Pick	Player	Club	Club	League	Notes
1	Lily Quigley	Gold Coast	Brisbane Academy	Talent League Girls	
2	Maisy Evans	Greater Western Sydney	Bond University	QAFL Women's	Received after retirement of Katherine Smith
3	Emma Dineen	Essendon	Kerry	All-Ireland SLFC	Received after Bess Keaney chose to remain on inactive list
4	Amaia Wain	Western Bulldogs	Sydney Academy	Talent League Girls	Received after Maggie Gorham was placed on inactive list
5	Noa McNaughton	Fremantle	East Fremantle	WAFL Women's	Received after Áine Tighe was placed on inactive list
6	Sienna Gerardi	West Coast	Swan Districts	WAFL Women's	Received after retirement of Sophie McDonald
7	Saoirse Lally	St Kilda	Mayo	All-Ireland SLFC	Received after Nicola Xenos was placed on inactive list
8	Mikaylah Antony	Hawthorn	Central District	SANFL Women's	
9	Lauren Clifton	Melbourne	South Adelaide	SANFL Women's	Received after Blaithin Mackin chose to remain in Ireland
10	Sophia Gaukrodger	Greater Western Sydney	Greater Western Sydney Academy	Talent League Girls	Received after retirement of Claire Ransom
11	Lily Smart	West Coast	Sturt	SANFL Women's	Received after Alison Drennan was placed on inactive list

== See also ==
- 2025 AFL draft
- 2025–26 AFL Women's player movement period
