= Bronte Parker =

Australian rules footballer (born 2007)

Personal information
- Born: 19 January 2007 (age 19)
- Original teams: Bond University (QAFLW); Burleigh Bombettes (QFAW)
- Draft: No. 32, 2025 national draft
- Debut: Round 1, 2026, Gold Coast vs. Western Bulldogs, at Carrara Stadium
- Height: 171 cm (5 ft 7 in)
- Position: Medium forward

Club information
- Current club: Gold Coast
- Number: 32

Playing career^{1}
Years	Club	Games (Goals)
2026–	Gold Coast	6 (0)
- ^{1} Playing statistics correct to the end of round 6, 2026.

Bronte Parker born 19 January 2007) is an Australian rules footballer who plays for the Gold Coast Suns in the AFL Women's (AFLW).

== Early life ==
Parker was raised on the Gold Coast, Queensland where she attended Marymount College throughout her upbringing. She initially played OzTag at the state level and competed in Surf lifesaving before signing up to play Australian rules football at the Burleigh Bombers at 13 years of age. Parker was invited to join the Gold Coast Suns Academy shortly after picking up the sport and progressed her way through the junior ranks at Burleigh before switching to Bond University to play in the top level senior QAFLW competition. She played for Bond University in the 2024 QAFLW senior grand final team alongside future Suns teammates Havana Harris, Mia Salisbury and Nyalli Milne before tearing her anterior cruciate ligament in early 2025 and missing the majority of her draft year.

== AFLW career ==
Parker was selected by Gold Coast with pick 32 in the AFLW draft held on 15 December 2025. She made her debut in round 1 of the 2026 AFLW season.
