= Alannah Welsh =

Australian rules football player

Personal information
- Full name: Alannah Welsh
- Born: 23 November 2007 (age 18)
- Original teams: Southport (QAFLW); Burleigh Bombettes (QFAW); Coolangatta Tweed Blues (QFAW)
- Draft: No. 12, 2025 AFL Women's draft
- Height: 169 cm (5 ft 7 in)
- Position: Forward

Club information
- Current club: Gold Coast
- Number: 15

Playing career^{1}
Years	Club	Games (Goals)
2026–	Gold Coast	2 (5)
- ^{1} Playing statistics correct to the end of Round 2, 2026 season.

Alannah Welsh (born 23 November 2007) is an Australian rules footballer playing for Gold Coast in the AFL Women's competition (AFLW).

== Early life ==
Welsh grew up on the Gold Coast where she attended renowned sporting school Palm Beach Currumbin State High. She played an array of sports throughout her childhood, which included state representative honours in Australian rules football, basketball, swimming and surf lifesaving. She began playing football for the Coolangatta Tweed Blues in the local Gold Coast junior leagues and was a standout in her age group that was invited to join the Gold Coast Suns Academy at the age of 13.

Welsh briefly switched to play local football for Burleigh before joining Southport and playing in their historic first 2024 QAFLW senior premiership, where she kicked three goals in their grand final win at 16 years of age. She earned All-Australian honours at the U16 and U18 levels throughout her junior career and was awarded the Suns Academy MVP award for in her final year of junior football. Welsh also starred for her school football team when she led Palm Beach Currumbin to the 2023 AFL Queensland State Championship and was voted best on ground in the grand final.

== AFLW career ==
In December 2025, Welsh was drafted to her hometown team, the Gold Coast Suns, with pick 12 in the 2025 AFL Women's draft. In just her second AFLW game, Welsh impressed many onlookers with a thrilling five-goal performance in Gold Coast's 35-point win over the West Coast Eagles at Mineral Resources Park.
