= Monique Bessen =

Australian rules footballer

Mon Bessen

Personal information
- Full name: Monique Bessen
- Born: 5 February 2007 (age 19)
- Original team: Sturt (SANFLW)
- Draft: No. 40, 2025 National draft
- Debut: Round 9, 2026, Fremantle vs. North Melbourne, at Arden St Oval
- Height: 173 cm (5 ft 8 in)

Club information
- Current club: Fremantle
- Number: 17

Playing career^{1}
Years	Club	Games (Goals)
2026–	Fremantle	3 (0)
- ^{1} Playing statistics correct to the end of the 2026 season.

Monique Bessen (born 5 February 2007) is an Australian rules footballer playing for the Fremantle Football Club in the AFL Women's (AFLW). Bessen was drafted by Fremantle with the 40th selection in the 2025 National draft.

Originally from the Adelaide Hills, Bessen played junior football from the age of nine for Mitcham, before playing senior football for Hahndorf and then Sturt in the SANFL Women's League. She represented South Australia at the 2025 Under-18 Girls National Championships, and also played for the AFLW Academy team in a match against the All-Stars.

Bessen made her debut in the ninth round of the 2026 AFL season.
