= Holly Egan =

Australian rules footballer

Personal information
- Born: 1 July 2006 (age 20)
- Original team: Murray Bushrangers (Talent League Girls)
- Draft: No. 34, 2024 AFL Women's draft
- Debut: Round 3, 2026, Fremantle vs. Carlton, at Cockburn ARC
- Height: 176 cm (5 ft 9 in)

Club information
- Current club: Fremantle
- Number: 11

Playing career^{1}
Years	Club	Games (Goals)
2025–	Fremantle	6 (0)
- ^{1} Playing statistics correct to the end of the 2026 season.

Holly Egan (born 1 July 2006) is an Australian rules footballer playing for the Fremantle Football Club in the AFL Women's (AFLW). Egan was drafted by Fremantle with the 34th selection in the 2024 AFL Women's draft after playing for Murray Bushrangers in the Talent League Girls.

She missed the entire 2025 AFL Women's season after suffering an injury to her anterior cruciate ligament during a pre-season match in July 2025. After spending the year rehabilitating her knee, she made her debut in the third round of the 2026 AFL season.

Egan's sister Grace Egan also plays in the AFL Women's league for Adelaide.
