= Kristie-Lee Weston-Turner =

Australian rules footballer (born 2005)

Personal information
- Full name: Kristie-Lee Weston-Turner
- Born: 1 July 2005 (age 21)
- Original team: Western Jets (Talent League Girls)
- Draft: No. 1, 2023 national draft No. 37, 2025 national draft
- Debut: Round 1, 2024, Western Bulldogs vs. Greater Western Sydney, at Manuka Oval
- Height: 176 cm (5 ft 9 in)
- Position: Forward

Club information
- Current club: North Melbourne
- Number: TBC

Playing career^{1}
Years	Club	Games (Goals)
2024–2025	Western Bulldogs	8 (4)
2026–	North Melbourne	0 (0)
Total		8 (4)
- ^{1} Playing statistics correct to the end of the 2025 season.

Kristie-Lee Weston-Turner (born 1 July 2005) is an Australian rules footballer with the North Melbourne Football Club in the AFL Women's (AFLW). She previously played for the Western Bulldogs from 2024 to 2025, where she was drafted with the number-one pick in the 2023 national draft.

== Early life ==
Weston-Turner played for the Spotswood Football Club and Sunshine Heights Football Club in the Western Region Football League at local level during her youth. In her draft year of 2023, she played for the Western Jets in the Talent League Girls, but broke her wrist while at school, limiting her appearances prior to the 2023 AFL Women's draft. She also featured for Victoria Metro during the AFL National Championships in 2023.

== AFL Women's career ==
Weston-Turner was drafted by the Western Bulldogs with the first overall pick in the 2023 draft, becoming the club's third number-one draft pick in the AFLW's short history. During Weston-Turner's debut season with the Bulldogs, she was also studying in her final year of high school. Despite her commitments, she debuted for the club in round one of the 2024 season against Greater Western Sydney at Manuka Oval. She played seven games in her inaugural campaign.

Struggling for form in 2025, Weston-Turner only played one game, featuring in round six following games in the VFL Women's. Following the conclusion of the season, she requested a trade to reigning back-to-back premiers North Melbourne with the hopes to revitalise her career. A trade did not come to fruition, and so Weston-Turner self-delisted from the Bulldogs to nominate for the national draft, through which she was drafted by North Melbourne with pick 37.
