= Sunny Lappin =

- Lappin in November 2026

Personal information
- Full name: Sunny Lappin
- Born: 28 November 2007 (age 18)
- Original team: Southport Sharks (QAFLW)
- Draft: No. 4, 2025 AFLW draft
- Height: 169 cm (5 ft 7 in)
- Position: Midfielder

Club information
- Current club: Gold Coast

Playing career^{1}
Years	Club	Games (Goals)
2026–	Gold Coast	0 (0)
- ^{1} Playing statistics correct to the end of 2025.

Sunny Lappin is a professional Australian rules footballer who was selected by the Gold Coast Suns with the fourth pick in the 2025 AFL Women's draft.

== Early life ==
Lappin was born in Melbourne and grew up on the Gold Coast from the age of six when her father accepted an assistant coaching role with the Gold Coast Suns in 2014. Her father, Matthew Lappin, is a former professional Australian rules footballer who played 251 AFL games for Carlton and St Kilda, as well as briefly playing for Gold Coast's reserves team in 2015. Her first cousin once removed, Nigel Lappin, is also a former professional footballer who played 279 AFL games for Brisbane, which included their triple premiership era in the early 2000s. Her second cousin, Meg Lappin, is a professional AFLW player with the Brisbane Lions.

Sunny attended Hillcrest Christian College throughout her upbringing and initially played basketball in her younger years before switching to Australian rules football shortly after the AFLW competition was established when she began playing junior football for the Southport Sharks as a 10-year-old. A year later she convinced school friend and future Suns teammate Ava Usher to begin playing football instead of her preferred sports of basketball, netball and surf life saving. In 2019, the pair would lead Hillcrest Christian College to a AFL Queensland Junior State Championship and both were invited to join the Gold Coast Suns Academy soon after. Along with football, Lappin and Usher continued to play basketball for their school and were Hillcrest Christian College's top scorers in their 2023 UI7 Australian National Schools Basketball Championship.

Leading into her draft year, Lappin was eligible to be father-daughter drafted to Carlton or St Kilda, as well as academy elgiible for the Gold Coast, and after many months of speculation she elected to nominate the Gold Coast Suns as her draft preference. Lappin's achievements in her draft year include All-Australian honours after an outstanding performance at the U18 National Championships for Queensland and a best on ground performance for Southport in their 2025 QAFLW Senior Grand Final victory.

== AFLW career ==
Lappin was drafted to her hometown team, the Gold Coast Suns, with the fourth selection in the 2025 AFL Women's draft after the Suns matched a bid from Adelaide.
