= Noa McNaughton =

Australian rules footballer

Personal information
- Born: 20 October 2006 (age 20)
- Original team: East Fremantle (WAFLW)
- Draft: No. 5, 2026 Pre-season draft
- Debut: Round 3, 2026, Fremantle vs. Carlton, at Cockburn ARC
- Height: 158 cm (5 ft 2 in)

Club information
- Current club: Fremantle
- Number: 20

Playing career^{1}
Years	Club	Games (Goals)
2026–	Fremantle	10 (9)
- ^{1} Playing statistics correct to the end of the 2026 season.

Noa McNaughton (born 20 November 2006) is an Australian rules footballer playing for the Fremantle Football Club in the AFL Women's (AFLW). McNaughton was drafted by Fremantle with the 5th selection in the 2026 Pre-season draft as a replacement player for the injured Áine Tighe. She had previously played for East Fremantle in the WAFL Women's league.

McNaughton made her debut in the third round of the 2026 AFL season.
