= Dekota Baron =

Australian rules footballer (born 2007)

Personal information
- Full name: Dekota Baron
- Born: 1 March 2007 (age 19)
- Original teams: Southport (QAFLW); Broadbeach (QFAW); Springwood (QFAW)
- Draft: No. 15, 2025 national draft
- Height: 178 cm (5 ft 10 in)
- Position: Key forward

Club information
- Current club: Gold Coast
- Number: 24

Playing career
Years	Club	Games (Goals)
2026–	Gold Coast	4 (5)

Dekota Baron (born 1 March 2007) is an Australian rules footballer with the Gold Coast Suns in the AFL Women's (AFLW).

== Early life ==
Baron grew up in Logan, Queensland and began playing Australian rules football at Springwood at five years of age. She joined the Gold Coast Suns Academy as a teenager and later switched to play her club football for Broadbeach before eventually transferring to Southport where she played in two QAFLW premierships for the Sharks in 2024 and 2025.

== AFL Women's career ==
Baron was drafted to the Gold Coast Suns with pick 15 in the 2025 AFL Women's draft. She made her AFLW debut for the Suns in round 1 of the 2026 AFLW season. In round 7 of the 2026 AFLW season, Baron was nominated for the Rising Star award after a three-goal performance against St Kilda.
