= Aoife Healy =

Personal information
- Born: 14 February 2004 (age 22)
- Draft: 2025 rookie signing
- Debut: Round 1, 2026, Fremantle vs. Port Adelaide, at Cockburn ARC
- Height: 179 cm (5 ft 10 in)
- Position: Defender

Club information
- Current club: Fremantle
- Number: 33

Playing career^{1}
Years	Club	Games (Goals)
2026–	Fremantle	11 (0)
- ^{1} Playing statistics correct to the end of the 2026 season.

Career highlights
- All-Ireland camogie championship: 2023 and 2024

Aoife Healy (born 14 February 2004) is an Irish Australian rules footballer playing for Fremantle in the AFL Women's (AFLW).

Healy originally played Ladies' Gaelic football and camogie for Cork, winning the All-Ireland camogie titles in 2023 and 2024. In December 2005 it was announced that she had signed to play Australian rules football for Fremantle from the 2026 AFL Women's season.

She made her AFLW debut in the opening round of 2026.
