= Chloe Bown =

Australian rules footballer (born 2007)

Personal information
- Born: 20 December 2007 (age 18)
- Original team: Oakleigh Chargers (Talent League Girls)
- Draft: No. 5, 2025 national draft
- Debut: Round 1, 2026, Adelaide vs. Sydney, at Unley Oval
- Height: 173 cm (5 ft 8 in)
- Position: Midfielder

Club information
- Current club: Adelaide
- Number: 5

Playing career^{1}
Years	Club	Games (Goals)
2026–	Adelaide	4 (3)
- ^{1} Playing statistics correct to the end of round 4, 2026.

Career highlights
- Rising Star nominee: 2026

Chloe Bown (born 20 December 2007) is a professional Australian rules football player who currently plays for the Adelaide Crows in the AFL Women's (AFLW).

== Early life ==
Bown did lifesaving and played basketball in her youth, but at age twelve made the switch to Australian rules football. She played at the Oakleigh Chargers in the Talent League Girls for three seasons from 2023 to 2025. She also represented Victoria Metro at the AFL National Championships. She was awarded with the Most Valuable Player award in the 2025 season, averaging 28 disposals for the Chargers. Bown also won the best and fairest award at both the Chargers and Vic Metro. Her accolades were capped off with the captaincy of the under-18 All-Australian team as she became a contender for the number-one pick in the upcoming 2025 national draft.

Bown grew up supporting the Hawthorn Football Club in the Australian Football League.

== AFL Women's career ==
Bown on debut against Sydney in 2026

With the fifth overall pick in the 2025 national draft, Bown was drafted by the Adelaide Crows. She was given the number five guernsey vacated by Rachelle Martin.

She made her AFLW debut in the round one loss to Sydney at Unley Oval in 2026, and registered eight score involvements. She kicked her first career goal a few weeks later against West Coast in round three. Following a career-best 25 disposals in round 10 against Gold Coast, and a match-winning goal, Bown was nominated for the 2026 AFL Women's Rising Star award.
