= Mikayla Nurse =

Australian rules footballer (born 2007)

Personal information
- Full name: Mikayla Nurse
- Born: 19 September 2007 (age 19)
- Original teams: Southport (QAFLW); Pacific Pines (QFAW); Jimboomba (QFAW)
- Draft: No. 13, 2025 national draft
- Height: 166 cm (5 ft 5 in)
- Position: Forward

Club information
- Current club: Gold Coast
- Number: 16

Playing career
Years	Club	Games (Goals)
2026–	Gold Coast	6 (0)

Mikayla Nurse (born 19 September 2007) is an Australian rules footballer with the Gold Coast Suns in the AFL Women's (AFLW).

== Early life ==
Nurse grew up on the Gold Coast, Queensland and attended Pacific Pines State High School alongside future Suns teammate Rhianna Ingram throughout their upbringing where they were both members of the school's AFL Excellence program. Nurse began playing Australian rules football for the Jimboomba Redbacks at nine years of age before switching clubs a few years later and playing the majority of her junior football for the Pacific Pines Power in the Gold Coast AFL junior leagues. Nurse joined the Gold Coast Suns Academy as a teenager and transferred clubs to Southport where she played in the 2025 QAFLW premiership for the Sharks.

== AFL Women's career ==
Nurse was drafted to the Gold Coast Suns with pick 13 in the 2025 AFL Women's draft. She made her AFLW debut for the Suns in round 1 of the 2026 AFLW season.
