= Olivia Gorman =

Australian rules footballer (born 2007)

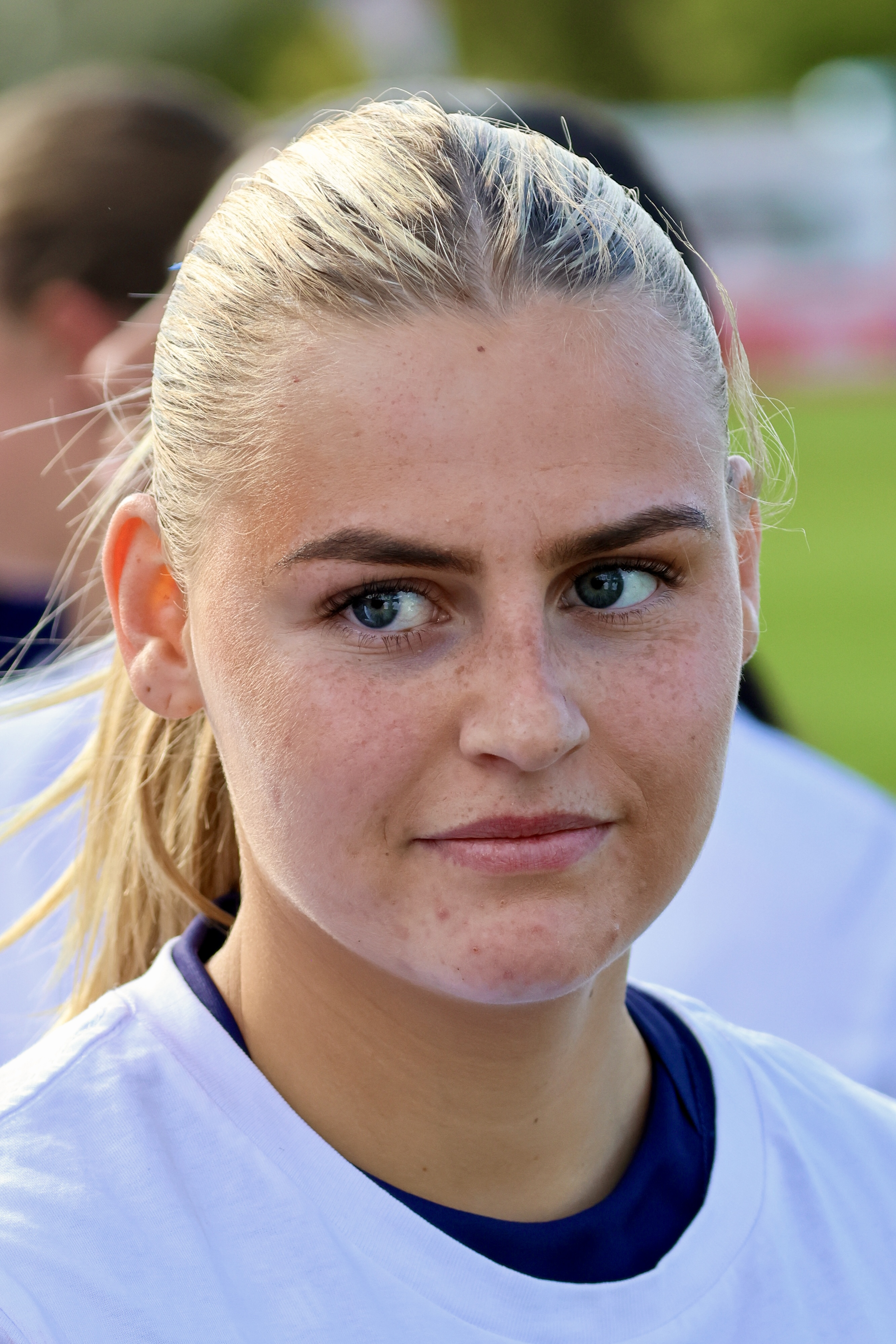
- Gorman with Adelaide in 2026

Personal information
- Born: 25 October 2007 (age 19)
- Original team: Northern Knights (Talent League Girls)
- Draft: No. 25, 2025 national draft
- Debut: Round 1, 2026, Adelaide vs. Sydney, at Unley Oval
- Height: 167 cm (5 ft 6 in)
- Position: Midfielder

Club information
- Current club: Adelaide
- Number: 33

Playing career^{1}
Years	Club	Games (Goals)
2026–	Adelaide	2 (0)
- ^{1} Playing statistics correct to the end of round 2, 2026.

Olivia Gorman (born 25 October 2007) is a professional Australian rules football player who currently plays for the Adelaide Crows in the AFL Women's (AFLW).

== Early life ==
Gorman began her football journey at age four, playing Auskick in Melbourne, Australia. She represented the Northern Knights in the Talent League Girls competition across four years, beginning as a double bottom-ager. She averaged 25 disposals and kicked five goals for the Knights during her draft year for 2025. She also played for Vic Metro in the AFL Women's Under-18 Championships.

Gorman grew up supporting the Hawthorn Football Club in the Australian Football League.

== AFL Women's career ==
Gorman was drafted by the Adelaide Crows with the 25th overall pick in the 2025 national draft, which was the last pick of the first round. Possessing defensive capabilities, Gorman was drafted to usher in Adelaide's next generation of midfielders, particularly amid the recent departures of Chelsea Randall and Anne Hatchard.

She made her debut in the round one, 2026 loss to Sydney at Unley Oval. She kept her spot following a successful debut with nine disposals and four tackles.
