= Rhianna Ingram =

Australian rules footballer (born 2007)

Personal information
- Full name: Rhianna Ingram
- Born: 20 October 2007 (age 19); Northern Ireland
- Original teams: Southport (QAFLW); Pacific Pines (QFAW)
- Draft: No. 44, 2025 national draft
- Height: 167 cm (5 ft 6 in)
- Position: Defender

Club information
- Current club: Gold Coast
- Number: 27

Playing career
Years	Club	Games (Goals)
2026–	Gold Coast	3 (0)

Rhianna Ingram (born 20 October 2007) is an Australian rules footballer with the Gold Coast Suns in the AFL Women's (AFLW).

== Early life ==
Ingram was born in Northern Ireland and grew up on the Gold Coast, Queensland. She attended Pacific Pines State High School alongside future Suns teammate Mikayla Nurse throughout their upbringing where they were both members of the school's AFL Excellence program. Ingram began playing Australian rules football for the Pacific Pines Power in the Gold Coast AFL junior leagues and later switched to play for Southport where she played in the 2025 QAFLW premiership for the Sharks. She joined the Gold Coast Suns Academy at 13 years of age and has stated that she is a lifelong Suns supporter.

== AFL Women's career ==
Ingram was drafted to the Gold Coast Suns with pick 44 in the 2025 AFL Women's draft. She made her AFLW debut for the Suns in round 7 of the 2026 AFLW season.
