= Indi Strom =

Australian rules footballer

Personal information
- Full name: Indi Strom
- Born: 8 October 2004 (age 22)
- Original team: South Fremantle
- Draft: No. 51, 2024 AFL Women's National draft
- Height: 182 cm (6 ft 0 in)
- Position: Defender

Club information
- Current club: Fremantle
- Number: 26

Playing career^{1}
Years	Club	Games (Goals)
2025–	Fremantle	21 (0)
- ^{1} Playing statistics correct to the end of the 2026 season.

Indi Strom (born 8 October 2004) is an Australian rules footballer who plays for Fremantle in the AFL Women's (AFLW). Her sister, Mim, also plays for Fremantle.

== Early life ==
Strom is from the small coastal town of Exmouth, Western Australia. In 2024, she moved to Perth, playing 14 games for South Fremantle in the WAFL Women's and was a train on at Fremantle throughout the 2024 AFL Women's season. She was drafted by Fremantle with pick number 51 in the 2024 AFL Women's National draft, with her sister, Mim, presenting her match jumper. Her two older brothers, Zach and Noah, both play in the West Australian Football League (WAFL) for South Fremantle, with the former also serving as Fremantle's ruck coach in the AFL Women's.

== AFLW career ==
Strom made her debut in Round 1 of the 2025 AFL Women's season, recording 10 disposals and 3 tackles.
