= Cockburn ARC =

Recreation centre in Western Australia

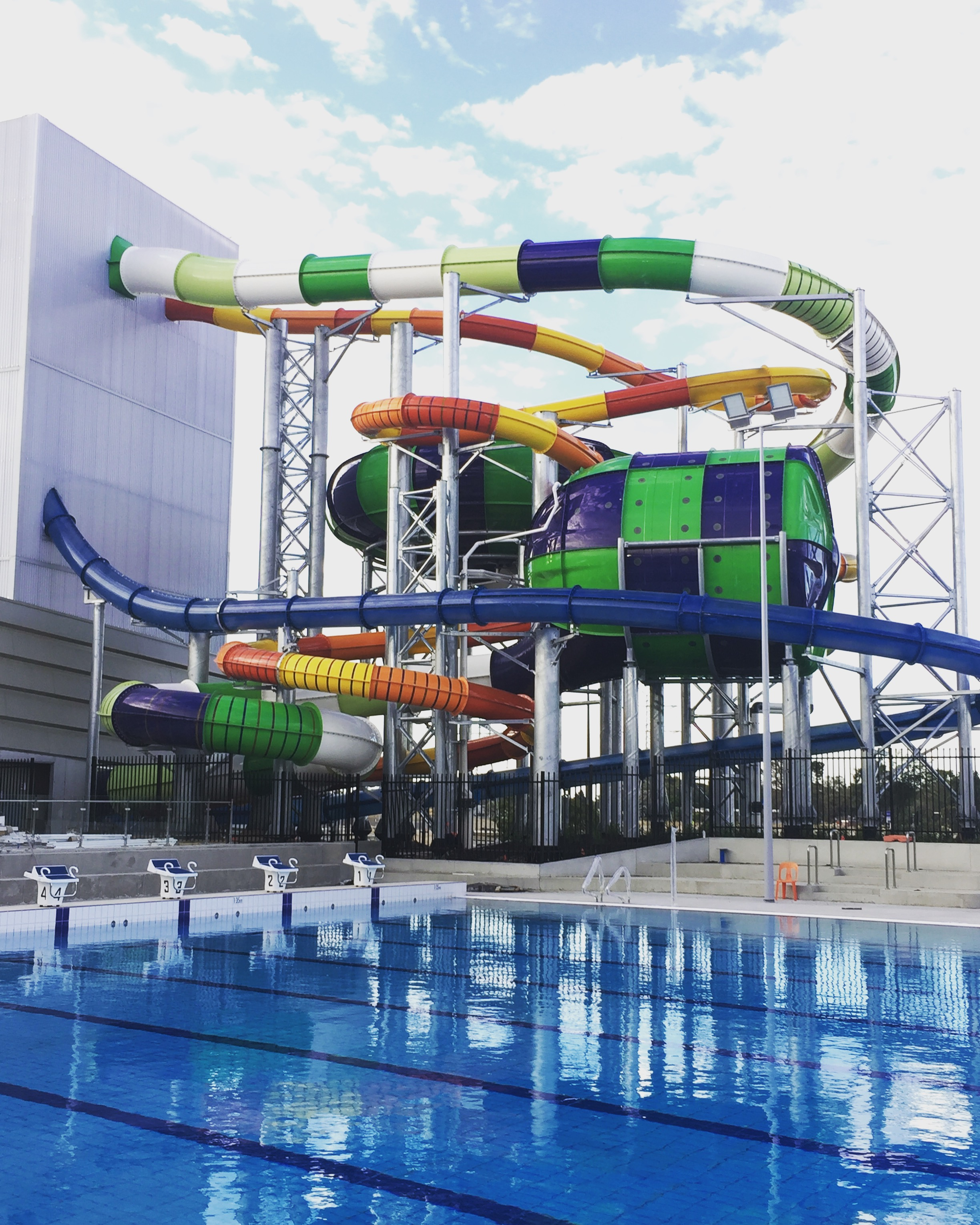
Outdoor pool and water slides

Cockburn Aquatic and Recreation Centre (commonly known as Cockburn ARC) is an aquatic and recreation centre located in the southern Perth suburb of Cockburn Central. The facility also contains the administrative and training headquarters of professional Australian rules football club the Fremantle Football Club, who compete in the Australian Football League (AFL).

== Community use ==
The ARC is owned and operated by the City of Cockburn which provides community access to most of the facilities. There are indoor and outdoor aquatic facilities as well as basketball courts. Swim, fitness and sports classes are available. The centre features three water slides that opened in May 2017. However, all 3 water slides have been indefinitely closed and non-operational since late 2023, as the City of Cockburn conducts a structural and operational review of the slides to ensure community safety.

== Fremantle Football Club ==
After being previously based at Fremantle Oval, in February 2015 the Fremantle Football Club (nicknamed the Dockers) announced that it would move to the new facility at Cockburn. Construction of the $109 million facility began later that year. The major features of the facility that are usually reserved for the club include the Victor George Kailis Oval, an Australian rules football oval that is Fremantle's primary outdoor training facility. The oval features embankments and standing room for approximately 3,000 spectators. It is equipped with a GPS program that shows instantly where goal posts and markings can be moved to replicate other stadium dimensions. An indoor training centre with half a football oval marked across six basketball courts is used by the club and is also available for community use, while aquatic recovery, hydrotherapy and pools area, an altitude chamber with sleeping area for players and an indoor running track are available. A function centre and the club's main administrative and football department offices are in use and a retail outlet for club supporters is located at the entrance to Cockburn ARC.

The Dockers moved into the 6,000 m^{2} (65,000 sq ft) facility in February 2017. The Victor George Kailis Oval is named in recognition of one of the club's founding member families, who were regular donors to the Fremantle Dockers Foundation. The oval hosted its first organised football match in February 2023, when Fremantle played Adelaide in a pre-season practice match. In February 2024 the club announced an expansion of the facility, to include new changerooms for AFL Women's (AFLW) players, an undercover 250-seat spectator viewing stand and a multipurpose function and education space. The $7.4 million expansion, which was jointly funded by Fremantle, the West Australian government, the West Australian Football Commission and the AFL, was unveiled in September 2025.

In 2026 the club announced it would play all its future AFL Women's (AFLW) home games at Cockburn ARC, ending its 10-year stint of home AFLW matches at Fremantle Oval. As part of the announcement the club confirmed that Cockburn ARC will undergo additional redevelopment, to be completed by 2029, that will accommodate an indoor training facility, improved venue and spectator infrastructure amenities and mixed-use health, education and community facilities. Fremantle was defeated by Port Adelaide in the first premiership match held at Cockburn ARC oval on 16 August 2026, with a crowd of 2,514 in attendance.

== Awards ==
- Community Facility of the Year Award — 2018 Parks and Leisure Australia Awards
