= Poppy Stockwell =

Australian cricketer

Personal information
- Full name: Poppy J Stockwell
- Born: 24 October 2003 (age 23)
- Batting: Right-handed
- Role: Wicket-keeper

Domestic team information
- Years: Team
- 2021/22–present: Western Australia

Career statistics
Competition	WLA
Matches	7
Runs scored	49
Batting average	12.33
100s/50s	0/0
Top score	25
Catches/stumpings	1/1
- Source: CricketArchive, 3 March 2023

Poppy J Stockwell (born 24 October 2003) is an Australian sportswoman. She plays Australian rules football as a half-forward for Hawthorn in the AFL Women's league and for Perth in the WAFL Women's, after previously playing for Fremantle and South Fremantle. She also previously played cricket as a right-handed batter and wicket-keeper for Western Australia in the Women's National Cricket League (WNCL).

== Cricket career ==
Stockwell made her debut for Western Australia on 27 February 2022, against South Australia in the WNCL, scoring 25 from 31 balls. She played one more match for the side that season, scoring 9 against Queensland. She played three matches for the side in the 2022–23 WNCL.

== Australian rules football career ==
Stockwell played for South Fremantle in the WAFL Women's league, winning the club best and fairest and goal kicking award in 2024, kicking 24 goals for the season. In 2025 she was selected by Fremantle to be a replacement player for Ebony Antonio, who had announced her pregnancy. Stockwell was selected to make her debut against Essendon in round 6 of the 2025 season. She kicked a goal in her debut match, but only played one additional game for the season, and was delisted at the end of the year.

In 2026, Stockwell switched to play for Perth in the WAFL Women's league, where she performed well. She was selected to represent Western Australian in their state game against South Australia, where she kicked four goals. In June 2026, she was selected by Hawthorn as a replacement player.
