= List of AFL debuts in 1996 =

During the 1996 Australian Football League (AFL) season 81 Australian rules footballers made their AFL debut with 48 others playing their first game for a new club.

== Summary ==
Summary of debuts in 1996
Club	AFL debuts	Change of club
Adelaide	4	5
Brisbane Bears	6	0
Carlton	1	5
Collingwood	4	4
Essendon	3	2
Fitzroy	8	1
Footscray	2	4
Fremantle	8	3
Geelong	6	2
Hawthorn	5	4
Melbourne	6	5
North Melbourne	6	2
Richmond	6	2
St Kilda	6	5
Sydney	3	3
West Coast	7	1
Total	81	48

== AFL debuts ==
Name	Club	Age at debut	Debut round	Games		Goals		Notes
Name	Club	Age at debut	Debut round	1996	Career	1996	Career	Notes
Kane Johnson	Adelaide	18 years, 115 days	14	2	220	3	76	
Peter Vardy	Adelaide	20 years, 163 days	14	7	137	5	206	
Matthew Collins	Adelaide	19 years, 129 days	10	8	43	2	7	
Ronnie Burns	Geelong	23 years, 16 days	1	21	154	31	262	
Jason Snell	Geelong	18 years, 246 days	1	3	68	3	62	
David Cockatoo-Collins	Melbourne	17 years, 363 days	1	1	2	0	0	Twin brother of Don
Don Cockatoo-Collins	Melbourne	17 years, 363 days	1	2	9	4	3	Twin brother of David
Brad Cassidy	Fitzroy	19 years, 249 days	1	14	16	10	10	
Peter Berbakov	Essendon	22 years, 221 days	1	17	52	4	14	
Scott Bamford	Fitzroy	21 years, 281 days	1	22	59	6	33	
Matthew Primus	Fitzroy	21 years, 79 days	1	20	157	5	81	Round 1 1996 Rising Star nomination
Daniel Chick	Hawthorn	20 years, 50 days	1	22	252	14	210	Round 10 1996 Rising Star nomination
Craig Treleven	Hawthorn	25 years, 290 days	1	21	78	7	22	
Joe McLaren	St Kilda	18 years, 110 days	1	11	69	2	39	
Jason Traianidis	St Kilda	21 years, 144 days	1	13	62	9	36	
Andrew McLean	St Kilda	22 years, 256 days	1	6	6	1	1	
Danny Dickfos	Brisbane Bears	25 years, 182 days	1	22	65	1	0	
Troy Johnson	Brisbane Bears	18 years, 248 days	1	2	2	0	0	
Scott Taylor	Footscray	19 years, 160 days	1	1	1	0	0	
Andrew Donnelly	West Coast	23 years, 2 days	1	20	68	28	69	
Chad Morrison	West Coast	18 years, 2 days	1	18	169	24	88	Round 16 1996 Rising Star nomination
Steven Pitt	Collingwood	22 years, 253 days	1	13	18	14	16	
Gavin Mitchell	Fremantle	23 years, 94 days	1	21	88	11	82	
Greg Harding	Fremantle	19 years, 196 days	1	18	78	1	3	Round 4 1996 Rising Star nomination
Brendon Fewster	West Coast	22 years, 88 days	1	3	70	2	43	
Mark West	Footscray	23 years, 3 days	2	4	16	2	3	
Tristan Lynch	Brisbane Bears	22 years, 228 days	2	21	72	1	15	
Kane Fraser	Hawthorn	18 years, 266 days	3	2	5	2	0	
Ben Holland	Richmond	18 years, 339 days	3	11	191	3	179	Brother of Nick Holland
Matthew Nicks	Sydney	20 years, 337 days	3	6	175	2	125	
Jason Cripps	St Kilda	19 years, 183 days	3	11	60	3	10	
Clive Waterhouse	Fremantle	21 years, 296 days	3	11	106	9	178	
Darren O'Brien	Melbourne	27 years, 31 days	4	13	24	7	9	
Michael Brown	Fremantle	19 years, 213 days	4	10	22	6	15	
Ben Cousins	West Coast	17 years, 296 days	4	20	270	34	217	Round 12 1996 Rising Star nomination & overall winner, son of Bryan Cousins
Phillip Matera	West Coast	20 years, 146 days	4	5	179	8	389	Brother of Wally & Peter Matera
Scott Lucas	Essendon	18 years, 117 days	5	14	270	11	471	
Steven Koops	Fremantle	17 years, 277 days	5	6	89	6	49	
David Wirrpanda	West Coast	16 years, 268 days	5	5	227	4	131	
Steven King	Geelong	17 years, 157 days	5	13	240	3	83	Round 15 1996 Rising Star nomination
Stefan Carey	Sydney	20 years, 100 days	6	4	48	1	23	
Clint Bizzell	Geelong	19 years, 310 days	6	4	163	1	79	
Sam McFarlane	North Melbourne	20 years, 150 days	6	2	2	2	0	
Shane Clayton	Fitzroy	17 years, 193 days	6	13	117	1	52	
Brent Frewen	Fitzroy	18 years, 197 days	6	2	2	1	0	
Nick Carter	Fitzroy	18 years, 8 days	6	17	25	4	6	Round 8 1996 Rising Star nomination
Ross Funcke	Richmond	18 years, 170 days	6	4	40	2	5	
Jade Rawlings	Hawthorn	18 years, 208 days	6	2	148	1	96	Brother of Brady Rawlings
Clark Keating	Brisbane Bears	20 years, 48 days	6	14	139	9	83	Brother of Aaron Keating
Todd McHardy	Melbourne	19 years, 37 days	7	3	5	1	1	
Luke Toia	Fremantle	18 years, 171 days	7	13	63	11	33	Round 20 1996 Rising Star nomination
Michael Polley	Melbourne	19 years, 254 days	9	5	5	2	0	
Barry Hall	St Kilda	19 years, 109 days	9	4	289	2	746	
Damien Ryan	Richmond	18 years, 297 days	9	11	60	1	9	
Justin Blumfield	Essendon	18 years, 197 days	10	10	148	3	91	
Ben Moore	Richmond	18 years, 347 days	11	4	24	2	11	
Ben Wilson	Collingwood	19 years, 113 days	11	2	6	2	0	
Simon Prestigiacomo	Collingwood	18 years, 138 days	11	12	233	6	3	
James Clement	Fremantle	19 years, 286 days	11	12	230	1	51	
Ben Robbins	Brisbane Bears	19 years, 178 days	12	5	92	1	21	
Clinton King	Sydney	18 years, 93 days	12	5	89	3	23	
Scott Welsh	North Melbourne	17 years, 199 days	12	1	205	0	363	
Daniel Healy	St Kilda	22 years, 53 days	12	1	38	0	24	
Jason Ramsey	Fitzroy	21 years, 158 days	13	2	2	7	0	
Eric Lissenden	North Melbourne	24 years, 187 days	14	2	2	1	1	
Daniel Parker	Fremantle	22 years, 45 days	14	1	25	1	18	Brother of Shane Parker
Aaron Hamill	Carlton	18 years, 328 days	15	4	190	1	239	
Jason Bevan	Collingwood	18 years, 88 days	15	2	2	3	0	
Robert Powell	Richmond	20 years, 118 days	15	8	66	15	60	
Andrew Leoncelli	Melbourne	22 years, 3 days	16	7	146	3	66	
Glenn Gorman	North Melbourne	20 years, 183 days	17	2	2	1	0	
Matthew Robbins	Geelong	19 years, 82 days	17	1	146	0	135	
Joel Bowden	Richmond	18 years, 38 days	17	5	265	4	174	Son of Michael Bowden, brother of Patrick Bowden
Ashley Fernee	Adelaide	19 years, 36 days	17	2	2	2	0	
Angelo Lekkas	Hawthorn	20 years, 35 days	18	3	180	3	120	
Daniel Bradshaw	Brisbane Bears	17 years, 257 days	18	3	231	3	524	Brother of Darren Bradshaw
Robert McMahon	Fitzroy	19 years, 9 days	18	2	2	2	1	
Shane Sikora	West Coast	19 years, 148 days	18	2	3	2	0	
Danny Stevens	North Melbourne	19 years, 287 days	21	1	15	1	7	
Carl Steinfort	Geelong	19 years, 154 days	22	2	92	2	26	
Brent Harvey	North Melbourne	18 years, 112 days	22	1	432	0	518	Record holder, most matches played by an individual in VFL/AFL history. Brother of Shane Harvey

== Change of AFL club ==
Name	New Club	Age at debut	Debut round	Games		Goals		Previous club
Name	New Club	Age at debut	Debut round	1996	Career	1996	Career	Previous club
Anthony Ingerson	Melbourne	26 years, 168 days	1	18	158	10	40	Adelaide
Martin McKinnon	Geelong	20 years, 268 days	1	19	86	8	50	Adelaide
David Grant	Melbourne	29 years, 235 days	1	7	198	1	75	St Kilda
Craig Turley	Melbourne	30 years, 218 days	1	16	131	8	99	West Coast
Alastair Clarkson	Melbourne	27 years, 337 days	1	22	134	13	85	North Melbourne
Mick Dwyer	Fitzroy	27 years, 135 days	1	8	88	3	64	St Kilda
Peter Bell	North Melbourne	20 years, 29 days	1	23	286	23	250	Fremantle, Round 17 1996 Rising Star nomination
Darren Kappler	Hawthorn	31 years, 68 days	1	19	187	14	152	Fitzroy & Sydney
Robert Neill	St Kilda	22 years, 86 days	1	20	44	7	16	Sydney
Brad Wira	Footscray	24 years, 14 days	1	21	96	1	18	Fremantle
Todd Curley	Footscray	23 years, 77 days	1	18	118	22	48	Collingwood
Adrian Hickmott	Carlton	24 years, 1 days	1	22	184	13	131	Geelong
Justin Murphy	Carlton	19 years, 342 days	1	16	185	19	151	Richmond
Brad Rowe	Fremantle	26 years, 129 days	1	8	73	7	80	Brisbane Bears & Collingwood
Alex McDonald	Collingwood	26 years, 48 days	1	22	107	9	44	Hawthorn
Scott Crow	Collingwood	22 years, 104 days	1	22	75	7	37	Hawthorn
David Hynes	Fremantle	29 years, 0 days	1	12	86	4	59	West Coast
Tony Godden	Fremantle	23 years, 347 days	1	7	24	5	14	West Coast
Andy Lovell	West Coast	25 years, 247 days	1	23	164	13	166	Melbourne
Shane Ellen	Adelaide	23 years, 91 days	1	17	65	2	16	Footscray
Darren Jarman	Adelaide	29 years, 64 days	1	19	230	46	386	Hawthorn
Troy Bond	Adelaide	22 years, 261 days	1	20	94	14	77	Carlton
Peter Caven	Adelaide	25 years, 320 days	1	20	139	17	55	Fitzroy & Sydney
Kym Koster	Adelaide	23 years, 60 days	1	9	133	4	44	Footscray
Kevin Dyson	Sydney	28 years, 332 days	1	22	105	1	28	Melbourne
Stuart Maxfield	Sydney	23 years, 357 days	1	24	289	14	152	Richmond
Craig O'Brien	Sydney	26 years, 28 days	1	18	114	34	191	Essendon & St Kilda
James Cook	Footscray	22 years, 91 days	2	5	77	5	139	Carlton
Luke Beveridge	St Kilda	25 years, 227 days	2	16	118	16	107	Melbourne & Footscray
Leon Higgins	Hawthorn	27 years, 284 days	2	1	122	2	80	Sydney
Darren Gaspar	Richmond	19 years, 322 days	2	20	228	1	23	Sydney
Craig Nettelbeck	Melbourne	23 years, 318 days	2	20	78	10	42	Sydney
Brendan Krummel	Hawthorn	23 years, 294 days	3	11	74	2	50	West Coast & Fremantle
Ben Sexton	Carlton	23 years, 168 days	3	4	43	1	33	Footscray
Craig Devonport	Carlton	26 years, 85 days	4	1	95	1	82	St Kilda
Matthew Francis	Collingwood	25 years, 235 days	4	10	55	2	23	Richmond
Paul Salmon	Hawthorn	31 years, 92 days	4	18	324	4	561	Essendon
Allen Jakovich	Footscray	28 years, 31 days	4	7	54	7	208	Melbourne
Matthew Young	St Kilda	23 years, 216 days	4	19	118	5	20	Hawthorn
Anthony Darcy	St Kilda	24 years, 30 days	4	3	18	3	2	Geelong & Footscray
Sean Wellman	Essendon	21 years, 213 days	4	9	212	1	34	Adelaide
Ben Harrison	Richmond	21 years, 96 days	4	8	161	2	71	Carlton
Glenn Kilpatrick	Geelong	23 years, 242 days	5	11	146	12	35	Essendon
Bradley Plain	North Melbourne	26 years, 215 days	5	1	56	1	96	Essendon & Collingwood
Robert Pyman	Collingwood	24 years, 211 days	6	5	40	1	17	North Melbourne
Paul Barnard	Essendon	23 years, 97 days	8	15	151	3	79	Hawthorn
Jamie Elliott	St Kilda	23 years, 124 days	10	9	58	1	69	Fitzroy & Essendon
Peter Turner	Carlton	22 years, 187 days	17	2	5	0	1	Adelaide
