= List of Subiaco footballers who have also played in the VFL/AFL =

Players of Subiaco football club in Perth, Western Australia

West Australian Football League (WAFL) club Subiaco has a relationship with the VFL/AFL dating back to the start of the 20th century, with numerous players moving in both directions to and from Victoria and Western Australia. To cover for two-way movement, a separate list is provided for players who moved to Subiaco from the VFL/AFL. Lists are also provided for those who have played for the Western Australia-based AFL teams, West Coast and Fremantle. Only footballers who have played at least one senior game in the VFL/AFL are included.

== Players recruited / drafted into VFL/AFL from Subiaco ==
Club	Player(s)	Time at club	Games (Goals)	Notable achievements
Adelaide	Matthew Connell; Tyson Stenglein	1995–2000; 1999–2004	96 (28); 106 (26)	2× AFL Premiership (1997, 1998)
Brisbane Bears/Brisbane Lions	Des Headland; Daniel Rich	1999–2002; 2009–current	52 (52); 259 (114)	AFL Premiership 2002
Carlton	Brighton Diggins; Mike Fitzpatrick; Simon White	1938–1940; 1975–1983; 2010–2017	31 (6); 150 (150); 87 (12)	VFL Premiership 1938; 3× VFL Premiership (1979, 1981, 1982)
Collingwood	Peter Eakins	1970–1972	32 (1)	
Essendon	Michael Symons	1992–1999	109 (80)	
Fitzroy				
Footscray/Western Bulldogs	Peter Featherby; Dennis Blair	1975–1976; 1976–1978	42 (15); 41 (9)	
Geelong	Len Metherell; Peter Featherby; Mitchell White; Sam Menegola	1930–1936; 1979–1983; 2001–2003; 2016–current	110 (117); 93 (79); 23 (21); 109 (76)	VFL Premiership 1931
Gold Coast	Kyal Horsley	2012–2013	14 (3)	
Greater Western Sydney				
Hawthorn	Cyril Collard; Gary Buckenara	1957–1958; 1982–1990	13 (3); 154 (293)	4× VFL Premiership (1983, 1986, 1988, 1989), 3× All-Australian (1983, 1985, 1986)
Melbourne	Warren Dean	1987–1989	32 (25)	
North Melbourne	Matthew Burton	2000–2003	77 (33)	
Port Adelaide	Jarrad Schofield; Mitch Georgiades	1999–2004; 2020–current	131 (93); 38 (50)	AFL Premiership 2004
Richmond	Neil Balme	1970–1979	159 (229)	2× VFL Premiership (1973, 1974)
South Melbourne/Sydney	Brighton Diggins; Bill Faul; Austin Robertson Jr.; Trent Dennis-Lane	1932–1937; 1932–1938; 1966; 2010–2012	65 (21); 117 (2); 18 (60); 19 (30)	VFL Premiership 1933; VFL Premiership 1933
St Kilda	George Young; Jason Heatley; Trent Dennis-Lane	1973–1978; 1997–2000; 2013–2014	108 (284); 60 (163); 10 (9)	
sources: Subiaco Football Club 2018 Yearbook, p. 53; VFL/AFL Players from Subiaco - Draftguru

There is a list of past and present Subiaco players who have played at AFL/VFL:

- Richard Ambrose (Sydney Swans) (1993)
- Jack Anthony (Collingwood and Fremantle) (2008–2012)
- David Antonowicz (West Coast Eagles) (2000)
- Horrie Bant (1882–1957) (St Kilda and Essendon) (1906–1910)
- Dave Barry (1888–1913) (South Melbourne) (1909–1910)
- Peter Bird (Fitzroy) (1995–1996)
- John Bowe (1911–1990) (South Melbourne) (1933)
- Todd Breman (West Coast Eagles and Richmond) (1989–1993)
- Peter Bennett (Hawthorn and Essendon) (1976-1981)
- Greg Broughton (Fremantle and Gold Coast) (2009–2015)
- Jay Burton (Fremantle) (1995)
- Bill Bushell (1888–1951) (St Kilda) (1910)
- Ted Cahill (1902–1968) (Footscray) (1927-1928)
- Brad C. Campbell (St Kilda) (1997–1999)
- Bruce Campbell (1890–1964) (Carlton, Fitzroy and Melbourne) (1911–1912; 1920)
- Adam Cockie (West Coast Eagles) (2008–2009)
- Davitt Coghlan (Fitzroy) (1925, 1928-1930)
- Matthew Connell (West Coast Eagles and Adelaide) (1993–2000)
- Brian Cook (Melbourne) (1977)
- Jack Cooper (1922–2003) (Carlton) (1947)
- Lou Daily (1911–1974) (Collingwood and Geelong) (1933–1934)
- Ian Dargie (St Kilda and West Coast Eagles) (1989–1991)
- Col Davey (1927–2013) (Collingwood) (1951–1952)
- Rochford Devenish-Meares (Hawthorn) (1968)
- Ernie Eiffler (1925–2014) (Collingwood) (1945)
- Doug Fraser (1886–1919) (Carlton) (1910)
- Michael R. Gardiner (Collingwood) (1998–1999)
- Nick Gelavis (South Melbourne and Footscray) (1953–1954)
- John Georgiades (Footscray) (1989–1991)
- Tim Gepp (Richmond and Footscray) (1983–1986)
- Tony Godden (West Coast Eagles and Fremantle) (1993–1998)
- David Gourdis (Richmond) (2010–2011)
- Chris Hall (Port Adelaide) (2003)
- Damian Hampson (West Coast Eagles) (1993–1994)
- Kyron Hayden (North Melbourne) (2018-Current)
- David Haynes (West Coast Eagles and Geelong (2000–2005)
- Graham Heal (North Melbourne) (1968)
- Jason Heatley (West Coast Eagles and St Kilda) (1995–2000)
- Evan Hewitt (North Melbourne and Adelaide) (1997–2002)
- Todd Holmes (West Coast Eagles) (1998–2000)
- Bret Hutchinson (Melbourne) (1985)
- Ron Jacks (Footscray) (1973)
- Jarrhan Jacky (Adelaide) (2008)
- Bob Johnson (1935–2001) (Melbourne) (1954–1961)
- Jarrod Kayler-Thomson (Hawthorn) (2010)
- Adam Lange (Kangaroos) (1999–2002)
- Johnny Leonard (1903–1995) (South Melbourne) (1932)
- Andrew Macnish (West Coast Eagles and Geelong) (1987–1992)
- Neil Marshall (West Coast Eagles) (1997–1998)
- Sam McFarlane (North Melbourne) (1996)
- Paul McDonald (Essendon) (1975–1978)
- Daniel Metropolis (West Coast Eagles and Fremantle) (1992–2001)
- Harry Morgan (1889–1956) (South Melbourne and Carlton) (1914–1915; 1917–1918; 1921)
- George Moysey (1874–1932) (Melbourne) (1897–1899)
- David Mundy (Fremantle) (2005–present)
- John O'Connell (1951–1989) (Carlton) (1970–1976)
- Glenn O'Loughlin (West Coast Eagles) (1987)
- Billy Orr (1883–1963) (Carlton) (1903)
- Daniel Parker (Fremantle) (1996–1999)
- Seff Parry (1907–1980) (Fitzroy) (1933)
- Stan Penberthy (1906–1989) (Footscray and Melbourne) (1932–1937)
- Todd Ridley (Essendon, Fremantle and Hawthorn) (1991–1997)
- Michael Rix (St Kilda) (2006–2008)
- Lester Ross (St Kilda) (1959)
- Eric Sarich (South Melbourne) (1965-1968; 1971)
- Joe Scaddan (1886–1971) (Collingwood) (1910)
- Phil Scott (West Coast Eagles) (1987–1990)
- David Sierakowski (St Kilda and West Coast) (1994–2003)
- Callum Sinclair (West Coast Eagles and Sydney Swans) (2013–present)
- Peter Spencer (North Melbourne) (1981–1982)
- Lance Styles (Carlton) (1973–1974)
- Jack Sweet (1919–2006) (South Melbourne) (1943)
- Michael Taylor (Fremantle) (1995)
- Robert Thompson (Essendon) (1967–1971)
- Wayde Twomey (Carlton) (2011)
- Bill Valli (Collingwood and Essendon) (1979–1980)
- Cameron Venables (Collingwood) (1999)
- Shane Yarran (Fremantle) (2016)
- Mark Zanotti (West Coast Eagles, Brisbane Bears and Fitzroy) (1987–1995)

== Players who came to Subiaco from the VFL/AFL ==
- Frank Murphy, from Collingwood (1935–1937: 53 games, 11 goals)
- Haydn Bunton Sr., from Fitzroy (1938–1941: 72 games, 190 goals — 3× Sandover Medal 1938, 1939, 1941)
- Les Hardiman, from Geelong (1938–1941: 69 games, 122 goals)
- Keith Shea from Carlton (1938–1939: 37 games, 69 goals)
- Dave Cuzens, from Richmond (1962: 13 games, 8 goals)
- Brian Sierakowski, from St Kilda (1969–1974: 115 games, 20 goals — WANFL Premiership 1973)
- Peter Ellis, from Fitzroy (1972, 1974–78: 88 games, 63 goals)
- Ross Smith, from St Kilda (1973–1974: 39 games, 22 goals — WANFL Premiership captain-coach 1973)
- David Rhodes, from Fitzroy (1974–1977: 48 games, 33 goals)
- David Parkin, from Hawthorn (1975: 8 games, 2 goals)
- Graeme Schultz, from Essendon (1975–1981: 85 games, 137 goals)
- Vin Catoggio, from Carlton (1976–1977: 30 games, 53 goals)
- Brian Douge, from Hawthorn (1977–1981: 81 games, 23 goals)
- Derek Kickett, from Sydney (1997: 12 games, 29 goals)
- Daniel Chick, from West Coast (2008–2009: 22 games, 13 goals — WAFL Premiership 2008) [originally from East Fremantle]

== West Coast representatives ==
1. Laurie Keene, 1987–1990: 36 games, 38 goals — Kicked West Coast's first VFL/AFL goal
2. Dwayne Lamb, 1987–1994: 151 games, 44 goals — AFL Premiership 1992
3. Mark Zanotti, 1987–1988: 36 games, 6 goals
4. Karl Langdon, 1988–1995: 100 games, 107 goals — AFL Premiership 1992
5. Brett Heady, 1990–1999: 156 games, 237 goals — 2× AFL Premiership (1992, 1994)
6. Dean Kemp, 1990–2001: 243 games, 117 goals — 2× AFL Premiership (1992, 1994), Norm Smith Medal 1994, All-Australian 1992
7. Drew Banfield, 1993–2006: 265 games, 76 goals — 2× AFL Premiership (1994, 2006)
8. Jarrad Schofield 1993–1998: 63 games, 34 goals
9. Andrew Donnelly, 1996–2000: 68 games, 69 goals
10. Josh Wooden, 1997–2007: 96 games, 18 goals
11. Chad Fletcher, 1999–2009: 179 games, 74 goals — AFL Premiership 2006, All-Australian 2004
12. Mark Nicoski, 2004–2013: 112 games, 61 goals
13. Tyson Stenglein, 2005–2009: 102 games, 25 goals — AFL Premiership 2006
14. Matt Priddis, 2006–2017: 240 games, 73 goals — Brownlow Medal 2014, All-Australian 2015
15. Dom Sheed, 2014–current: 141 games, 64 goals — AFL Premiership 2018
16. Brayden Ainsworth, 2018–current: 15 games, 4 goals
17. Liam Ryan, 2018–current: 77 games, 111 goals — AFL Premiership 2018, All-Australian 2020

== Fremantle representatives ==
1. Matthew Burton, 1995–1999: 70 games, 32 goals
2. Shane Parker, 1995–2007: 238 games, 11 goals — First player to reach 200 AFL games for Fremantle
3. Luke Toia, 1996–2003: 63 games, 33 goals
4. Antoni Grover, 1999–2012: 202 games, 27 goals
5. Ryan Crowley, 2003–2015: 188 games, 117 goals
6. Des Headland, 2003–2010: 114 games, 125 goals
7. Jarrad Schofield, 2005–2006: 12 games, 2 goals
