= 1995 AFL draft =

Draft for the Australian Football League

The 1995 AFL draft was held at the conclusion of the 1995 Australian Football League (AFL) season.

The AFL draft is the annual draft of new unsigned players by Australian rules football clubs that participate in the main competition of that sport, the Australian Football League.

Clubs receive picks based on the position in which they finish on the ladder during the season, although these picks can be swapped around by teams for trading players.

== 1995 pre-draft selections ==
Type	Player	Recruited from	Club
Father–son	David Round	Calder Cannons	Footscray
Father–son	Simon Fletcher	Geelong Falcons	Geelong
Father–son	Joel Bowden	West Alice Springs	Richmond
Father–son	Nick Jewell	Prahran Dragons	Richmond
Father–son	Ben Cousins	East Fremantle	West Coast Eagles
Father–son	David Walls	Southport	Carlton
Pre-draft	Daniel Parker	Subiaco	Fremantle
Zone	Danny Dickfos	North Brisbane	Brisbane Bears
Zone	Brett Voss	Morningside	Brisbane Bears
Zone	Derek Wirth	Mount Gravatt	Brisbane Bears
Zone	Michael Brown	Swan Districts	Fremantle
Zone	Trent Carroll	Claremont	Fremantle
Zone	Michael Clark	Swan Districts	Fremantle
Zone	James Clement	South Fremantle	Fremantle
Zone	Brendon Feddema	East Fremantle	Fremantle
Zone	Greg Harding	Claremont	Fremantle
Zone	Steven Koops	West Perth	Fremantle
Zone	Gavin Mitchell	West Kimberley	Fremantle
Zone	Martin Whitelaw	West Perth	Fremantle
Zone	Ben Hollands	North Albury	Sydney Swans
Zone	Leigh Marshall	Murray Bushrangers	Sydney Swans
Zone	Ben Mathews	Murray Bushrangers	Sydney Swans

== 1995 national draft ==
Pick	Player	Recruited from	Club
1	Clive Waterhouse	Port Adelaide	Fremantle
2	Matthew Primus	Norwood	Fitzroy
3	Brendon Fewster	West Perth	West Coast
4	Scott Bamford	North Adelaide	Fitzroy
5	Brendan Krummel	Fremantle	Hawthorn
6	Daniel Healy	Central District	St Kilda
7	Ben Edwards	Claremont	Fremantle
8	Jared Crouch	Norwood	Sydney
9	Allen Jakovich	Melbourne	Footscray
10	Simon Prestigiacomo	Northern Knights	Collingwood
11	Don Cockatoo-Collins	Port Adelaide	Melbourne
12	Andrew Gowling	South Adelaide	Brisbane Bears
13	Brad Rowe	Collingwood	Fremantle
14	Luke Trew	Murray Bushrangers	West Coast
15	Darren Wheildon	West Adelaide	Essendon
16	Shane Clayton	Northern Knights	Fitzroy
17	Scott Welsh	West Adelaide	North Melbourne
18	Brent Williams	Prahran Dragons	Adelaide
19	Barry Hall	Murray Bushrangers	St Kilda
20	Nick Carter	Bendigo Pioneers	Fitzroy
21	Clinton King	Eastern Ranges	Sydney
22	Joe McLaren	Geelong Falcons	St Kilda
23	Jay Burton	Fremantle	Fremantle
24	Paul Licuria	Northern Knights	Sydney
25	Daniel Chick	East Fremantle	Hawthorn
26	Chris Groom	Fremantle	North Melbourne
27	Kane Johnson	Eastern Ranges	Adelaide
28	Nick Trask	Eastern Ranges	Brisbane Bears
29	Todd Curley	West Perth	Footscray
30	Craig Smoker	West Perth	West Coast
31	Andrew Ukovic	Northern Knights	Essendon
32	Nigel Credlin	Geelong Falcons	Fitzroy
33	Sam McFarlane	Subiaco	North Melbourne
34	Jason Snell	Eastern Ranges	Geelong
35	Brad Smith	Claremont	Richmond
36	Andrew Lamb	Murray Bushrangers	St Kilda
37	Scott Grainger	Northern Knights	Hawthorn
38	Jason Cripps	Central Dragons	St Kilda
39	Glenn Kilpatrick	West Adelaide	Geelong
40	Luke Godden	Northern Knights	Collingwood
41	Ryan Grinter	Geelong Falcons	St Kilda
42	Troy Johnson	South Fremantle	Brisbane Bears
43	Mark West	South Adelaide	Footscray
44	Jonson Clifton	Swan Districts	West Coast
45	Scott Hodges	Port Adelaide	Adelaide
46	Ben Moore	Glenelg	Richmond
47	Brent Harvey	Northern Knights	North Melbourne
48	Darren Milburn	Calder Cannons	Geelong
49	Ronnie Burns	St Mary's	Geelong
50	Brad Cassidy	Fremantle	Fitzroy
51	Kane Fraser	Eastern Ranges	Hawthorn
52	Tony Campbell	Footscray	Footscray
53	Adam Ugrinic	Woodville-West Torrens Eagles	Adelaide
54	Adam Ansell	West Adelaide	Hawthorn
55	Mark Bradly	East Fremantle	Melbourne
56	Daniel Bradshaw	Wodonga, (VCFL)	Brisbane Bears
57	Paul Whitelaw	West Perth	West Coast
58	Peter Berbakov	Glenelg	Essendon
59	Ewan Thompson	Northern Knights	Richmond
60	Darren O'Brien	West Perth	Melbourne
61	Daniel Lowther	Northern Knights	Geelong
62	Adrian Burdon	Tassie Mariners	Carlton
63	Jacob Anstey	Tuggeranong, (ACT)	Carlton
64	Matthew Carr	East Fremantle	Collingwood
65	Eric Lissenden	Warragul Industrials, (VCFL)	North Melbourne
66	Neil Marshall	Claremont	West Coast
67	Michael Raidis	Glenelg	Richmond
68	Brady Anderson	East Perth	Geelong
69	Daniel Marshall	Dandenong Stingrays	Carlton
70	Ashley Fernee	Calder Cannons	Adelaide
71	Jason Bevan	South Adelaide	Collingwood
72	Ashley Gehling	Dandenong Stingrays	Melbourne
73	Stuart Lamond	Woodville-West Torrens	Geelong
74	Mark Bradley	Gippsland Power	Collingwood
75	Clint Bizzell	Kedron Grange, AFLQ	Geelong
76	Ben Kemp	Norwood	Collingwood
77	Steven Pitt	Norwood	Collingwood

== 1996 pre-season draft ==
Pick	Player	Recruited from	Club
1	Brian McInnes	Cairns	Fitzroy
2	Craig Nettelbeck	Fremantle	Melbourne
3	Darren Gaspar	Sydney Swans	Richmond
4	Brent Frewen	South Mildura	Fitzroy
5	Gordon Fode	St Kilda	Hawthorn
6	Andrew McLean	North Launceston	St Kilda
7	Kent Butcher	Collingwood	Sydney Swans
8	Shane Ellen	Footscray	Adelaide
9	Mark Pitura	Richmond	Collingwood
10	Andrew Leoncelli	Old Xaverians	Melbourne
11	Tristan Lynch	Richmond	Brisbane Bears
12	Jason Lappin	Wodonga Raiders	Footscray
13	Andrew Donnelly	Subiaco	West Coast Eagles
14	Richard Peck	Claremont	Essendon
15	Peter Bell	Fremantle	North Melbourne
16	Craig Treleven	East Fremantle	Hawthorn
17	Jason Traianidis	Shepparton United	St Kilda
18	Simon Goodwin	South Adelaide	Adelaide
19	Matthew Waters	North Brisbane	Brisbane Bears
20	Matthew Young	Hawthorn	St Kilda
21	Brendan Logan	West Perth	Adelaide
22	Anthony Darcy	Port Adelaide	St Kilda

Type	Player	Recruited from	Club
Uncontracted	Kevin Dyson	Melbourne	Sydney Swans
Uncontracted	Stuart Maxfield	Richmond	Sydney Swans
Uncontracted	Tony Godden	West Coast Eagles	Fremantle
Compensation	David Wirrpanda	Eastern Ranges	West Coast Eagles
