= 1999 Westar Rules season =

1999 premiership season
- Teams: 9
- Premiers: West Perth; 17th premiership
- Minor premiers: South Fremantle; 11th minor premiership
- Sandover Medallist: Gus Seebeck (Perth)
- Leading goalkicker: Rod Tregenza (East Fremantle)
- Matches played: 94

The 1999 Westar Rules season was the 115th season of the various incarnations of the West Australian Football League and the third as "Westar Rules". It is most notable for the first winless season in open-age Western Australian football since Midland Junction in their final 1917 season lost all twelve of their games, although South Fremantle in the under-19 1944 competition lost all nineteen of their games. Peel Thunder, who at the completion of the season had won only two of their first sixty Westar Rules matches, achieved the equal second-longest winless season in a major Australian Rules league behind SANFL club Sturt in 1995. (Note: Central District in 1964 and several VFA/VFL clubs share the Thunder's ignominy of a 20-game winless season: Sandringham in 1941, Box Hill in 1951, and the Bendigo Diggers in 2001 and 2002.)

Although beforehand most critics thought the Thunder would improve on what they did in their first two seasons, late in the season none of the major Westar Rules writers gave them a chance to win even against second-last East Perth at Rushton Park. In the process Peel became the first team for fifty-four seasons to fail to score in the first half and suffered the second-worst loss in open-age WA(N)FL football. Amazingly, the Thunder's only near miss was against minor premier South Fremantle in the last round, when they led all day only to lose by seven points. (Note: The only other winless VFL, SANFL or WAFL clubs whose narrowest loss was to the minor premier have been St. Kilda in 1902, whose closest shave was against premiers Collingwood, also by seven points, and Sturt in 1995, whose narrowest loss was to Central District by 24 points.) Peel's reserves team also lost all twenty games, although their colts won thirteen matches and became the first Thunder team to reach the finals, where they would however kick only two goals against Claremont. Peel's inept performances led to controversy concerning the Thunder's existence among both critics and other Westar Rules clubs, which were to come to a tipping point in subsequent WAFC reports on the state of the competition, notably the "Fong Report" following the 2000 season.

Apart from Peel's ignominious season, East Perth, suffering from internal dissent and disputes over where they would play their home matches – Perth Oval was scheduled for redevelopment as a rectangular field for soccer club Perth Glory, – fell from fourth to second last in their worst season since 1989, winning only twice against the top seven clubs. South Fremantle and West Perth established themselves as the competition's heavyweights with a run of spectacular performances. Despite the pre-season loss of Peter Sumich and Scott Watters, the Bulldogs, aided by access to Docker players under the first host club scheme and whose season featured numerous "centenary year" celebrations, (Note: Both South Fremantle and Perth were formed in 1899, though South Fremantle's ancestry can be traced back to the older Fremantle Football Club.) won fifteen on end after an opening round defeat and the Falcons lost only once in the final fifteen home-and-away rounds.

== Home-and-away season ==
=== Round 1 (Easter weekend) ===
	Round 1
Saturday, 3 April	Perth 6.13 (49)	def. by	Subiaco 12.8 (80)	Lathlain Park (crowd: 1490)
Sunday, 4 April	Peel Thunder 11.6 (72)	def. by	Swan Districts 17.13 (115)	Rushton Park (crowd: 2245)
Sunday, 4 April (6:45 pm)	West Perth 14.13 (97)	def.	East Perth 5.9 (39)	Arena Joondalup (crowd: 2935)
Monday, 5 April	East Fremantle 18.14 (122)	def.	South Fremantle 14.10 (94)	East Fremantle Oval (crowd: 4012)
	Bye; Claremont
Seven straight majors in the final quarter ensure East Fremantle win their seventeenth consecutive match, after a seemingly depleted South Fremantle scores 6.5 (41) to 1.4 (10) in the third quarter.; In the first night match at Arena Joondalup, the troubled Royals start well but fade severely, not goalling between the seven-minute mark of the second quarter and the fifteen-minute mark of the last.

=== Round 2 ===
	Round 2
Saturday, 10 April	Peel Thunder 9.9 (63)	def. by	Subiaco 11.16 (82)	Rushton Park (crowd: 1132)
Saturday, 10 April	Swan Districts 9.8 (62)	def. by	West Perth 16.13 (109)	Bassendean Oval (crowd: 1902)
Saturday, 10 April	Claremont 17.19 (121)	def.	East Perth 6.11 (47)	Claremont Oval (crowd: 1377)
Sunday, 11 April	South Fremantle 21.20 (146)	def.	Perth 11.9 (75)	Fremantle Oval (crowd: 1261)
	Bye; East Fremantle
In a match billed as the "battle of the centenarians", Perth are completely outplayed in the first and final quarters as South Fremantle's Brad Bootsma stars with thirty-two kicks from a half-back flank.; Tiger coach Don Pyke uses the first host club scheme to create a seemingly perfect blend with Claremont's abundant supply of local juniors so that East Perth again fail against a powerful centreline.

=== Round 3 ===
	Round 3
Saturday, 17 April	Perth 9.8 (62)	def.	East Fremantle 8.12 (60)	Lathlain Park (crowd: 1447)
Saturday, 17 April	Subiaco 8.9 (57)	def. by	West Perth 10.12 (72)	Subiaco Oval (crowd: 1903)
Saturday, 17 April	Swan Districts 15.8 (98)	def.	Claremont 13.14 (92)	Bassendean Oval (crowd: 1391)
Saturday, 17 April	South Fremantle 33.21 (219)	def.	Peel Thunder 3.6 (24)	Fremantle Oval (crowd: 1142)
	Bye; East Perth
South Fremantle record the second-biggest win in open-age WAFL football, behind only West Perth's 210-point win over the Bulldogs in 1987. After the red and whites fail to goal in the first fifteen minutes, the remainder of the match is an embarrassment for Peel.; Perth end East Fremantle's run of seventeen straight victories, the equal ninth-longest in open-age Westar/WAFL/WANFL football, as the injury-plagued Darren Rigby – who had played only seventeen matches in four seasons due to leg fractures – dominates returning AFL star Shaun McManus.

=== Round 4 (Anzac Day) ===
	Round 4
Saturday, 24 April	Subiaco 22.17 (149)	def.	East Perth 3.1 (19)	Subiaco Oval (crowd: 1313)
Saturday, 24 April	West Perth 7.18 (60)	def. by	East Fremantle 14.8 (92)	Arena Joondalup (crowd: 2462)
Saturday, 24 April (6:45 pm)	Peel Thunder 4.10 (34)	def. by	Perth 9.18 (72)	Rushton Park (crowd: 1305)
Monday, 26 April	Claremont 7.9 (51)	def. by	South Fremantle 20.14 (134)	Claremont Oval (crowd: 2471)
	Bye; Swan Districts
East Perth suffer their biggest loss to Subiaco. The Royals record the fewest scoring shots in a WANFL/WAFL/Westar match since Claremont in 1945 against Perth and their fewest since 1913.

=== Round 5 ===
	Round 5
Saturday, 1 May	East Fremantle 19.18 (132)	def.	Peel Thunder 11.13 (79)	East Fremantle Oval (crowd: 1284)
Saturday, 1 May	Swan Districts 14.16 (100)	def.	East Perth 10.10 (70)	Bassendean Oval (crowd: 2128)
Saturday, 1 May	South Fremantle 11.15 (81)	def.	West Perth 11.10 (76)	Fremantle Oval (crowd: 1794)
Saturday, 1 May	Claremont 3.6 (24)	def. by	Subiaco 15.16 (106)	Claremont Oval (crowd: 1137)
	Bye; Perth
Subiaco become the first WAFL/WANFL/WASFL/Westar club to hold consecutive opponents to three or fewer goals since East Perth in Rounds 13 and 14 of 1919. The Lions' experience, especially in defence, completely decimates Claremont as Ryan O'Connor and Andrew Donnelly consistently keep the ball from the Tigers' forward line.; West Perth failed to catch South Fremantle after coach Tony Micale rested his top backmen and the Bulldogs get two key goals after fifteen goalless minutes at the star of the final quarter.

=== Round 6 ===
	Round 6
Saturday, 8 May	West Perth 12.14 (86)	def.	Perth 9.4 (58)	Arena Joondalup (crowd: 1302)
Saturday, 8 May	East Fremantle 26.13 (169)	def.	Claremont 11.9 (75)	East Fremantle Oval (crowd: 1417)
Saturday, 8 May	Subiaco 19.12 (126)	def.	Swan Districts 10.9 (69)	Subiaco Oval (crowd: 1228)
Saturday, 8 May	South Fremantle 16.23 (119)	def.	East Perth 7.4 (46)	Fremantle Oval (crowd: 1117)
	Bye; Peel Thunder

=== Round 7 ===
	Round 7
Saturday, 15 May	West Perth 20.13 (133)	def.	Peel Thunder 7.4 (46)	Arena Joondalup (crowd: 1282)
Saturday, 15 May	East Perth 8.14 (62)	def. by	East Fremantle 19.13 (127)	Perth Oval (crowd: 1380)
Saturday, 15 May	Swan Districts 11.6 (72)	def. by	South Fremantle 13.17 (95)	Bassendean Oval (crowd: 1686)
Saturday, 15 May	Claremont 14.8 (92)	def.	Perth 6.12 (48)	Claremont Oval (crowd: 1143)
	Bye; Subiaco
After long-serving ground disputes and modification of the draw, East Perth play their first home game for the season, but are thwarted by the return of former Eagle champion Chris Mainwaring, whose solid, injury-free display suggests he is ready for an AFL recall.

=== Round 8 ===
	Round 8
Saturday, 22 May	Perth 12.11 (83)	def. by	East Perth 13.9 (87)	Lathlain Park (crowd: 2031)
Saturday, 22 May	Peel Thunder 7.10 (52)	def. by	Claremont 15.15 (105)	Rushton Park (crowd: 976)
Saturday, 22 May	South Fremantle 7.13 (55)	def.	Subiaco 7.6 (48)	Fremantle Oval (crowd: 2010)
Saturday, 22 May	East Fremantle 16.12 (108)	def.	Swan Districts 8.12 (60)	East Fremantle Oval (crowd: 1575)
	Bye; West Perth
South Fremantle gain revenge for a thrashing in the pre-season Grand Final as their exceptional discipline shuts down a Lion team whose ability to deal with close tagging is questioned.; Seventeen-year-old Andrew Embley stars for Claremont, who are unsettled by Peel‘s tactic of using goalkicker Scott Simister and vice-captain Wayne Barden on the ball – Embley shuts both down after quarter-time when Peel had gained a surprise lead.; East Perth break a run of ten straight losses, their fourth-longest losing streak on record.

=== Round 9 ===
	Round 9
Saturday, 29 May	East Fremantle 10.11 (71)	def. by	Subiaco 11.15 (81)	East Fremantle Oval (crowd: 2097)
Saturday, 29 May	East Perth 15.7 (97)	def.	Peel Thunder 6.11 (47)	Perth Oval (crowd: 1481)
Saturday, 29 May	Swan Districts 12.13 (85)	def. by	Perth 13.11 (89)	Bassendean Oval (crowd: 1636)
Sunday, 30 May	Claremont 5.11 (41)	def. by	West Perth 14.13 (97)	Claremont Oval (crowd: 1931)
	Bye; South Fremantle
Troy Wilson's brilliant defensive marking and robust physical work in free play smashes the Tiger attack to make the four look already sealed with two-thirds of the season still to be played.; Despite having played only twenty Westar Rules games between them, youngsters Leon Davis, Chance Bateman, Darren Glass, Richard Kelly and Matt Shaw show Perth have a big AFL-ready talent pool with dominant displays in an unexpected narrow win for the Demons.

=== Round 10 (Foundation Day) ===
	Round 10
Saturday, 5 June	Subiaco 16.14 (110)	def.	Perth 8.8 (56)	Subiaco Oval (crowd: 1539)
Saturday, 5 June	Peel Thunder 7.12 (54)	def. by	Swan Districts 12.10 (82)	Rushton Park (crowd: 1137)
Monday, 7 June	East Perth 7.4 (46)	def. by	West Perth 18.17 (125)	Perth Oval (crowd: 2968)
Monday, 7 June	South Fremantle 13.8 (86)	def.	East Fremantle 12.10 (82)	Fremantle Oval (crowd: 12258)
	Bye; Claremont
The Foundation Day derby saw the last non-Grand Final Westar Rules/WAFL attendance of over 10,000 until 2009 and the third last to date. The Bulldogs win a high-standard thriller as the Sharks' run proves too late – a special win in their centenary year.

=== Round 11 ===
	Round 11
Saturday, 12 June	West Perth 17.14 (116)	def.	Swan Districts 5.8 (38)	Arena Joondalup (crowd: 1801)
Saturday, 12 June	Perth 12.9 (81)	def. by	South Fremantle 15.8 (98)	Lathlain Park (crowd: 1787)
Saturday, 12 June	East Perth 10.7 (67)	def. by	Claremont 16.10 (106)	Perth Oval (crowd: 1376)
Saturday, 12 June	Subiaco 17.14 (116)	def.	Peel Thunder 4.3 (27)	Subiaco Oval (crowd: 1263)
	Bye; East Fremantle
Peel Thunder become the first WANFL/WAFL/WASFL/Westar Rules club to fail to score in the first half since Claremont against Perth in 1945.; Perth's enthusiasm has them leading South Fremantle for over two quarters before Tony Delaney wrests control of the centre from Bateman and leads the Bulldogs to a ninth consecutive victory – equalling their 1998 win tally.

=== Round 12 ===
	Round 12
Saturday, 26 June	Perth 8.7 (55)	def. by	West Perth 21.23 (149)	Lathlain Park (crowd: 1423)
Saturday, 26 June	East Perth 6.11 (47)	def. by	South Fremantle 17.11 (113)	Perth Oval (crowd: 1431)
Saturday, 26 June	Swan Districts 6.20 (56)	def. by	Subiaco 20.8 (128)	Bassendean Oval (crowd: 1474)
Saturday, 26 June	Claremont 14.9 (93)	def.	East Fremantle 11.15 (81)	Claremont Oval (crowd: 1137)
	Bye; Peel Thunder
Swan Districts' inexperience has them thrashed despite having four more kicks and only two fewer scoring shots, (Note: The WA(N)FL/Westar record win with fewer shots is 53 points (with two fewer shots) by Claremont against Perth in 1994, whilst with equal shots the record is fifty points – also by Subiaco against Swan Districts – in 1968.) which lead to undisciplined frustration among the Swans' players.; East Perth are predictably outclassed by the top-of-the-table Bulldogs after being three goals ahead entering time-on of the opening quarter, as the Royals' initial desire and especially their forward line (which does not goal again until well into the last quarter) disintegrate.

=== Round 13 ===
	Round 13
Saturday, 3 July	West Perth 11.14 (80)	def.	Subiaco 8.8 (56)	Arena Joondalup (crowd: 2565)
Saturday, 3 July	Peel Thunder 5.8 (38)	def. by	South Fremantle 18.16 (124)	Rushton Park (crowd: 1266)
Saturday, 3 July	East Fremantle 13.15 (93)	def.	Perth 12.10 (82)	East Fremantle Oval (crowd: 1646)
Saturday, 3 July	Claremont 19.15 (129)	def.	Swan Districts 12.8 (80)	Claremont Oval (crowd: 922)
	Bye; East Perth
Steve Trewhella, whose start to 1999 was delayed by a broken wrist, plays a major role in a crucial win lifting the Falcons to clear second by tagging Fremantle-listed Luke Toia to completely reverse a 20-point half-time Lion lead that actually flattered West Perth.

=== Round 14 ===
	Round 14
Saturday, 10 July	Perth 13.9 (87)	def.	Peel Thunder 9.12 (66)	Lathlain Park (crowd: 1368)
Saturday, 10 July	East Fremantle 9.5 (59)	def. by	West Perth 16.14 (110)	East Fremantle Oval (crowd: 1897)
Saturday, 10 July	East Perth 8.8 (56)	def. by	Subiaco 20.9 (129)	Perth Oval (crowd: 1380)
Saturday, 10 July	South Fremantle 14.14 (98)	def.	Claremont 9.9 (63)	Fremantle Oval (crowd: 1818)
	Bye; Swan Districts
West Perth fan favourite Paul Mifka returns for his first match since a car accident in 1998, nullifying veteran Earl Spalding and keeping East Fremantle to three second-half goals after a close first half.; Fraser Gehrig's comeback for Perth is nearly upset by an inaccurate Thunder team

=== Round 15 ===
	Round 15
Saturday, 17 July	West Perth 4.17 (41)	def. by	South Fremantle 12.7 (79)	Arena Joondalup (crowd: 2328)
Saturday, 17 July	Peel Thunder 7.11 (53)	def. by	East Fremantle 20.13 (133)	Rushton Park (crowd: 1202)
Saturday, 17 July	East Perth 9.14 (68)	def. by	Swan Districts 14.14 (98)	Perth Oval (crowd: 1508)
Saturday, 17 July	Subiaco 10.9 (69)	def. by	Claremont 13.8 (86)	Subiaco Oval (crowd: 1553)
	Bye; Perth
Despite the handicap of working a one-man police station at Wyalkatchem 235 kilometres (150 mi) from Perth and training with the local team, South Fremantle veteran Marty Atkins' solid defence leaves the Bulldogs two games clear on top as West Perth cannot convert their chances.; East Fremantle's targeting of Peel as needing to go for an eight-club competition does nothing inspire the Thunder, who score only 2.6 (18) to 10.6 (66) in two quarters with the wind.

=== Round 16 ===
	Round 16
Saturday, 24 July	East Perth 11.6 (72)	def. by	Subiaco 13.11 (89)	Exmouth (crowd: 2114)
Saturday, 24 July	Perth 20.10 (130)	def.	Swan Districts 15.13 (103)	Moora (crowd: 1746)
Saturday, 24 July	Claremont 15.14 (104)	def.	East Fremantle 15.12 (102)	Claremont Oval (crowd: 1467)
	Bye; Peel Thunder, South Fremantle, West Perth
As relief for those who suffered from Cyclone Vance, Westar Rules play a game for the first and only time in the Pilbara town of Exmouth, and for one of only two times in Moora in Perth's country zone.; On a windy 29 °C (84.2 °F) day, Subiaco and East Perth are allowed a fourth interchange player (Note: The fourth interchange player would become standardised the following season.) Fringe Eagle Andrew Donnelly dominates as the Lions win in the trying weather.

=== Round 17 ===
	Round 17
Saturday, 31 July	Perth 12.10 (82)	def. by	Claremont 12.15 (87)	Lathlain Park (crowd: 1474)
Saturday, 31 July	Peel Thunder 7.4 (46)	def. by	West Perth 13.16 (94)	Rushton Park (crowd: 1219)
Saturday, 31 July	East Fremantle 17.15 (117)	def.	East Perth 13.9 (87)	East Fremantle Oval (crowd: 1662)
Saturday, 31 July	South Fremantle 30.11 (191)	def.	Swan Districts 8.10 (58)	Fremantle Oval (crowd: 1656)
	Bye; Subiaco
In a thrashing described as a "farce" with the Bulldogs taking 102 marks to 36 and having 113 effective handballs to 45, South Fremantle's Anthony Jones makes a memorable 100 metre run regarded as the best play in Westar Rules for a long time.

=== Round 18 ===
	Round 18
Saturday, 7 August	East Perth 10.8 (68)	def. by	Perth 19.4 (118)	Perth Oval (crowd: 1533)
Saturday, 7 August	Subiaco 14.8 (92)	def. by	South Fremantle 16.9 (105)	Subiaco Oval (crowd: 1517)
Saturday, 7 August	Swan Districts 11.18 (84)	def.	East Fremantle 11.17 (83)	Bassendean Oval (crowd: 1439)
Saturday, 7 August	Claremont 22.9 (141)	def.	Peel Thunder 9.8 (62)	Claremont Oval (crowd: 616)
	Bye; West Perth
Despite a broken left hand, South Fremantle's Brad Bootsma, with 32 possessions mainly in the second half, courageously leads a win after being behind for most of the last quarter, which virtually settles the double chance in the finals.; Swan Districts rebound from their South Fremantle thrashing to pip East Fremantle and leave Claremont in the four. The marking of West Coast Eagle discard Jason Ball and attack on the ball of Shane Beros win for Swans.

=== Round 19 ===
	Round 19
Saturday, 14 August	West Perth 11.22 (88)	def.	Claremont 9.9 (63)	Arena Joondalup (crowd: 2100)
Saturday, 14 August	Perth 18.12 (120)	def.	Swan Districts 10.10 (70)	Lathlain Park (crowd: 1642)
Saturday, 14 August	East Perth 13.20 (98)	def.	Peel Thunder 7.9 (51)	Perth Oval (crowd: 954)
Saturday, 14 August	Subiaco 25.11 (161)	def.	East Fremantle 12.4 (76)	Subiaco Oval (crowd: 1476)
	Bye; South Fremantle
Brendon Fewster's size and strength leaves Claremont with no options, as does Troy Wilson in defence. Only inaccurate kicking prevents a humiliation, but East Fremantle's thrashing keeps Claremont in the four.; East Perth's Ashley Hutchison is sent off after being reported twice – once for striking and once for spitting. He is one of four Westar players to suffer this ignominy.; In a game where, despite East Perth having won only twice, no tipster gave the Thunder a chance to break their winless season, Ryan Turnbull shows the form that made him a dominating figure in the Royals' mini-dynasty of the early 2000s.

=== Round 20 ===
	Round 20
Friday, 20 August (6:45 pm)	West Perth 14.11 (95)	def.	East Perth 10.8 (68)	Arena Joondalup (crowd: 1838)
Saturday, 21 August	Perth 7.10 (52)	def. by	Subiaco 16.14 (110)	Lathlain Park (crowd: 1798)
Saturday, 21 August	Swan Districts 22.12 (144)	def.	Peel Thunder 10.8 (68)	Bassendean Oval (crowd: 1228)
Saturday, 21 August	East Fremantle 17.23 (125)	def.	South Fremantle 10.15 (75)	East Fremantle Oval (crowd: 2849)
	Bye; Claremont
By guarding Bootsma and the other South Fremantle on-ballers, the Sharks end a worrying slump by convincingly ending the seemingly invincible Bulldogs' run of fifteen consecutive victories – in spite of kicking five goals fifteen behinds in the first half.

=== Round 21 ===
	Round 21
Friday, 27 August (6:45 pm)	South Fremantle 11.7 (73)	def.	Claremont 10.11 (71)	Fremantle Oval (crowd: 1317)
Saturday, 28 August	East Fremantle 7.11 (53)	def. by	West Perth 10.13 (73)	East Fremantle Oval (crowd: 1747)
Saturday, 28 August	Peel Thunder 7.9 (51)	def. by	East Perth 11.15 (81)	Rushton Park (crowd: 2569)
	Bye; Perth, Subiaco, Swan Districts
After Peel hold a narrow lead for most of the first half in wet conditions, Rhys Croxford dashed the Thunder's hope of a win for 1999 with one goal late in the second quarter and three early in the third – and Peel did not receive another chance.

=== Round 22 ===
	Round 22
Saturday, 4 September	East Perth 13.9 (87)	def.	Claremont 8.8 (56)	Perth Oval (crowd: 1605)
Saturday, 4 September	Subiaco 23.7 (145)	def.	Peel Thunder 7.5 (47)	Subiaco Oval (crowd: 927)
Saturday, 4 September	Swan Districts 7.7 (49)	def. by	West Perth 22.15 (147)	Bassendean Oval (crowd: 1772)
Saturday, 4 September	South Fremantle 20.10 (130)	def.	Perth 5.9 (39)	Fremantle Oval (crowd: 1538)
	Bye; East Fremantle
East Perth leave their home since 1910 of Perth Oval (though it was not known at the time) on a high with a win that denies Claremont a finals berth. The brilliant speed of Halls Creek recruit Brendan Thomas led the Royals to score 5.3 (33) to nothing after Claremont took the lead halfway through the last quarter in a game that had always been close to that stage.

=== Round 23 ===
	Round 23
Saturday, 11 September	West Perth 16.20 (116)	def.	Subiaco 16.7 (103)	Arena Joondalup (crowd: 1818)
Saturday, 11 September	Perth 11.8 (74)	def. by	East Fremantle 21.19 (145)	Lathlain Park (crowd: 1590)
Saturday, 11 September	Claremont 19.12 (126)	def.	Swan Districts 8.12 (60)	Claremont Oval (crowd: 918)
Saturday, 11 September (6:45 pm)	Peel Thunder 13.13 (91)	def. by	South Fremantle 13.20 (98)	Rushton Park (crowd: 1178)
	Bye; East Perth
The winless Thunder nearly cause a huge upset against the minor premiers, leading all day only to go down by seven points after the Bulldogs, looking for a "solid hit-out", rested six top players. It was the first time in thirty-two games Peel had actually led at half-time, and at one point they led by 37 points with Scott Simister in his best form.

== Ladder ==
1999 Westar Rules ladder
Pos	Team	Pld	W	L	D	PF	PA	PP	Pts
1	South Fremantle	20	18	2	0	2213	1342	164.9	72
2	West Perth (P)	20	17	3	0	1964	1191	164.9	68
3	Subiaco	20	14	6	0	2037	1251	162.8	56
4	East Fremantle	20	11	9	0	2030	1655	122.7	44
5	Claremont	20	11	9	0	1726	1700	101.5	44
6	Perth	20	7	13	0	1512	1899	79.6	28
7	Swan Districts	20	7	13	0	1583	2121	74.6	28
8	East Perth	20	5	15	0	1312	1991	65.9	20
9	Peel Thunder	20	0	20	0	1071	2298	46.6	0

Rules for classification: 1) points; 2) percentage; 3) number of points for.
(P) Premiers

== Finals ==
=== Semi-finals ===
	First semi-final
Sunday, 19 September	Subiaco 13.10 (88)	def.	East Fremantle 9.15 (69)	Subiaco Oval (crowd: 9,064)
Subiaco exploit East Fremantle's newfound lack of height to eliminate the reigning premiers, who score 2.10 (22) from many more opportunities in the final quarter.

	Second semi-final
Sunday, 19 September	South Fremantle 13.13 (91)	def.	West Perth 10.16 (76)	Subiaco Oval (crowd: 9,064)
Since the two semi-finals were played at the same venue on the same day, the attendance figure is the same.; A poor second quarter ensures West Perth are always playing catch-up football against the skill and experience of Atkins – and with Mann beating the Falcons' danger man in Fewster.

=== Preliminary final ===
	Preliminary final
Sunday, 26 September	West Perth 16.13 (109)	def.	Subiaco 6.8 (44)	Subiaco Oval (crowd: 6,149)
In wet conditions that had caused late changes to both teams, West Perth's defence crushes the Lions.; Subiaco were fined for playing a player who was not in their original list of 24.

=== Grand Final ===
1999 Westar Rules Grand Final
Saturday, 2 October	South Fremantle	def. by	West Perth	Subiaco Oval (crowd: 25,473)
3.1 (19); 8.1 (49); 10.5 (65); 11.6 (72)	Q1; Q2; Q3; Final	6.4 (40); 9.8 (62); 11.9 (75); 14.13 (97)	Umpires: Mark Fussell, Wayne French, Brett Rosebury; Simpson Medal: Christian Kelly (West Perth)
Taylor 3, Clark 2, Bootsma, Schell, Maher, Worsfold, Grover, PaRsons	Goals	Kelly 4, Fewster 2, Britten 2, Symmons 2, Logan, Bruce, Skender, Morrell
Toby McGrath, Cory McGrath, Taylor, Porter, Clucas	Best	Kelly, Kim Kigali, Fewster, Curley, Clayton Lassock, Mifka
West Perth jump the minor premiers unexpectedly and some brilliant play allows them to evade a Bulldog comeback to win comfortably.
