= Ted Cahill =

Ted Cahill may refer to:

- Ted Cahill (Australian footballer) (1902–1968), Australian rules footballer
- Ted Cahill (rugby league), English rugby league footballer of the 1950s
