= Mark Bradly =

Australian rules footballer (born 1977)

Personal information
- Full name: Mark Bradly
- Born: 24 January 1977 (age 49)
- Original team: East Fremantle
- Draft: 55th overall, 1995 National draft (Melbourne)
- Height: 197 cm (6 ft 6 in)
- Weight: 104 kg (229 lb)
- Position: Ruckman

Playing career^{1}
Years	Club	Games (Goals)
1996–2000	Melbourne	4 (3)
- ^{1} Playing statistics correct to the end of 2000.

Mark Bradly (born 24 January 1977) is a former Australian rules footballer who played for the Melbourne Football Club in the Australian Football League (AFL) and for North Ballarat in the Victorian Football League (VFL).

== Early career ==
Bradly played three senior matches for East Fremantle in the Western Australian Football League (WAFL) in 1995 and also represented Western Australia at the 1995 AFL Under 18 Championships (at the time called the Commonwealth Bank Cup). He was subsequently drafted with the 55th selection in the 1995 AFL draft by Melbourne as a long-term ruck prospect.

== AFL career ==
Bradly spent his first two seasons as an AFL-listed player, 1996 and 1997, playing for Melbourne's reserves. In his first season, Bradly was named as an emergency for one game, however he did not play a senior match. He was named in Melbourne's team for a match against North Melbourne in 1997, but he failed to actually make his debut. He finally made his debut in round 10 of the 1998 season, against the Adelaide Crows. Bradly had only four disposals in his first game and he was dropped back to the reserves for the next week. Bradly was called back up to the seniors for round 13 and, although he had a poor game playing on St Kilda veteran Stewart Loewe, he managed to string three senior games together before again being dropped, even though he kicked two goals in his final match. Bradly finished the season sixth in Melbourne's reserves best and fairest. Melbourne's premier ruckman for over a decade, Jim Stynes, retired at the end of 1998 and it was expected that Bradly would have more opportunities in 1999. However, Bradly failed to play a senior match for the Demons in 1999 after injuring his knee, which sidelined him for the season.

Bradly was delisted at the end of the 1999 season, but Melbourne redrafted him shortly after as a rookie list player in the 2000 Rookie draft. Bradly suffered a second consecutive season-ending knee injury and he was unable to play a game for Melbourne in 2000. After playing only four senior matches in five years at the club, Bradly was delisted permanently at the end of the 2000 season.

== VFL career ==
After being delisted by Melbourne, Bradly signed with VFL club, North Ballarat, in 2001, where he suffered from injury problems in his first year. Bradly played as a ruckman and as a forward for the Rosters and he was North Ballarat's leading goalkicker in 2002. He kicked 28 goals for the season, including a haul of six against Werribee. Bradly continued playing for the Roosters in 2003 and, in a game against Frankston, he kicked three goals.

== Personal life ==
Bradly was a groomsman at Melbourne team-mate, Russell Robertson's wedding.
