= Gordon Fode =

Australian rules footballer

Personal information
- Born: 5 August 1971 (age 55)
- Original team: St Francis Football Club
- Draft: No. 5, 1996 Pre-season Draft
- Height: 182 cm (6 ft 0 in)
- Weight: 87 kg (192 lb)

Playing career
Years	Club	Games (Goals)
1988–1995	St Kilda	52 (31)
1996	Hawthorn	0 (0)

Gordon Fode (born 5 August 1971) is a former Australian rules footballer who played with St Kilda in the Victorian Football League (VFL).

== Early life ==
Fode was a talented young athlete in several sports. He went to St. Leonards College Brighton East. Represented at state & national level in Athletics, Tennis, Soccer, & Snow Skiing. Fode, was a junior player for Sandringham Junior Soccer Club from the age of 5 until 13, and was captain for seven years, during this time played against his team mate, who went on to play for national Australian Socceroos with 29 Caps, Hall of Fame player for South Melbourne Hellas Football Club Paul Trimboli from Brighton Junior Soccer Club.

Fode, also played tennis as junior, Victorian Circuit, and was coached for small period by Australian former tennis champion Fred Stolle at South Yarra Tennis Club and in 1985, was Club U15 Junior Champion at Brighton Dendy Park Tennis Club. When he turned 14, Fode was asked to trial to play first time VFL/AFL for St. Francis Junior Football Club in Cheltenham. Fode only played eight games in 1985 SMJFL, from 16 rounds, and won Best & Fairest in SMJFL League, with only eight games played. Later in 1986, Fode was asked to join development squad at Moorabbin St Kilda Football Club. Recruiting Officer John Beverage, asked him to come down to trial, he was selected in U15 Nepean Development Squad with teammate Robert Harvey, Brett Bowey, Brad Pearce, Jason Daniels, who all went on to join U19 St Kilda Football Club Squad Team, with Shane Warne.

== VFL/AFL career ==
=== St Kilda (1988–1995) ===
Arrived as a young athlete aged 14, never played the game prior & was placed into St. Kilda Football Club development U15 Academy Squad with Robert Harvey, Brett Bowey, Jason Daniels, by St. Kilda Football Club recruitment manager John Beveridge. Alongside Fode, Harvey, Bowey, Daniels all managed to play U19 games & Reserves in that same year, as 15 year olds, which St. Kilda Football Club had the youngest teenagers during late 1980s. Fode made his senior debut in 1988, jersey number 50, at just 16+ 4 days, turning 17-year-old, in the last round of the 1988 VFL season youngest debutant in that year. His formidable opponent was former premiership player Tim Watson Essendon Football Club. At age 14, he was selected to represent Victorian U15 All Schoolboys Championships in 1986, & Victorian U17 Teal Cup squad in 1987, with making the All Australian U17 Squad Team. In 1989, Fode takes former half back flanker Russell Jefferies jersey, number 36. Fode was selected into St. Kilda Football Club Senior Team for season 1989.

He went on to play all 22 games in 1989 season. Then, 1990 to 1992 restricted him with hamstring injuries, only 4 games next two seasons. In 1993 Coach - Ken Sheldon, moves Fode into a forward Line, off defence during the 1993 AFL season saw him kick 17 goals from 11 matches, and he was part of a four-pronged attacking forward line playing alongside Tony Lockett, Stewart Loewe, Craig O'Brien, & Peter Everit.

In 1994, Stan Alves coaches and continues with four pronged forwards with Fode, Lockett, O'Brien, Loewe, and Everit, all contributing goal scoring season. Fode plays total 9 senior games 1994 and in 1995, another 5 senior games, before going into national draft 1996, where [Hawthorn Football Club] in 1996 AFL Centennial Year season.

=== Hawthorn (1996) ===
After 1995, he left St Kilda, and joined Hawthorn drafted Fode with 5th selection in the 1996 Pre-season draft. Fode played alongside former Premiership players Dunstall, Langford, Collins, Pritchard, Jenke, Dear, Hudson, Crawford, Holland, Dixon, Scott and Harford, during 1996 AFL Centenary year, pre-season night Cup. Fode played all reserves games in '96 season averaging a goal per every game, and only managed a few senior AFL pre-season games, but never debut senior game for [Hawthorn Football Club]. Fode retired young, aged 27, from the VFL/AFL at the end of the 1996 AFL season and went back to playing soccer, scoring goals as a striker & playing for Chelsea Hajduk Football Club now days, Dandenong City Football Club (Croatian team). In 1997, Fode was called up to trial out for the NSL league Melbourne Knights Football Club alongside former Croatian international forward striker Josip Biskic. But later, Fode was overlooked for a contract with the Melbourne Knights.

== Personal life ==
Both of Gordon Fode's parents were born in Croatia and played sport at a high level.

Fode's father, Marko Fode born in Croatia in 1942 on the island of Korcula in town called Blato. Marko Fode was a goalkeeper in NSL League for Footscray J.U.S.T FC (1965–1969) and South Melbourne Hellas FC from 1971 to 1974 and 1975/76. He holds National Soccer League/A-League Men club record for the most consecutive clean sheets (11) between round 8 and 18 in 1972.

Marko Fode was inducted into South Melbourne Hellas FC Hall of Fame selected squad of players, and representative multiple times for Victorian State team on numerous occasions between 1964 and 1975, as a goalkeeper playing against South Australia 1964, and 1965 against Moscow Torpedo at Olympic Park, in front of 25000 people.

Fode's mother, Georgina Fode, was born in a town called Slavonski Brod in Croatia in 1946. Later, moved to capital city Zagreb and studied at University of Zagreb University. Georgina Fode was a Victorian State School champion swimmer, freestyle, backstroke, & diving.
