= Luke Godden =

Australian rules footballer

Personal information
- Born: 21 September 1978 (age 48)
- Original team: Northern U18
- Debut: Round 18, 3 August 1997, Collingwood vs. St Kilda, at Melbourne Cricket Ground

Playing career^{1}
Years	Club	Games (Goals)
1997–1999	Collingwood	36 (0)
- ^{1} Playing statistics correct to the end of 1999.

Career highlights
- Larke Medal 1995

Luke Godden (born 21 September 1978) is a former Australian rules footballer in the Australian Football League

Godden was drafted in the 1995 AFL draft at number 40 to Collingwood after playing with the Northern Knights U18 side and starting at Yarrambat junior football club. His jumper was number 43 and played in the reserves during the first season at the club, and most of his second season, before breaking into the side for a debut late in the year. He played 36 games in 1998 at half-back, normally a receiving player, yet he played the game hard. His played well under pressure and was a great at being able to get the ball in most situations. In 1999 he had a good season statistically, playing consistent football, averaging 16 disposals a game, but with the side not performing, he was part of a process which Mick Malthouse adopted in re-constructing the side, surprising most when Godden was delisted.
