= Martin McKinnon =

Australian rules footballer

Personal information
- Full name: Martin McKinnon
- Born: 5 July 1975 (age 51); Adelaide
- Original team: Central District
- Draft: 26th, 1992 AFL draft
- Height: 189 cm (6 ft 2 in)
- Weight: 94 kg (207 lb)

Playing career^{1}
Years	Club	Games (Goals)
1994 – 1995	Adelaide	25 (7)
1996 – 1998	Geelong	54 (38)
1999 – 2000	Brisbane Lions	7 (5)
Total		86 (50)
- ^{1} Playing statistics correct to the end of 2000.

Career highlights
- AFL Rising Star nominee: 1995

Martin "Marty" McKinnon (born 5 July 1975 in Adelaide) is a former Australian rules footballer who played with Adelaide, Geelong and the Brisbane Lions in the Australian Football League (AFL).

McKinnon was recruited by Adelaide in the 1992 AFL draft, with their first ever national draft pick. He was the youngest player on Adelaide's list at the time and played for Central District in the SANFL when not appearing with Adelaide. He made his AFL debut late in the 1994 AFL season and was a regular in the team the following year, playing mostly as a wingman.

He twice received the maximum three Brownlow votes while with Adelaide, for 23 disposals in a win over reigning premiers Essendon in 1994 and for 25 disposals against St Kilda for which he received an AFL Rising Star nomination in 1995. He also represented South Australia's State of Origin side in their 1995 encounter against Victoria.

A left footer, McKinnon was traded to Geelong at the end of the 1995 season in a trade which helped bring Darren Jarman to Adelaide. He played in Geelong's first 18 games in 1996 and also a Qualifying Final. In 1997 he did not miss a game and appeared in two further finals. He had been used as a small forward that season and kicked 23 goals.

After three seasons at Geelong, McKinnon was traded to Brisbane for Scott Bamford and Tristan Lynch.

The nephew of SANFL great Phil Gallagher, McKinnon returned to his initial club Central District in 2001 and played in a premiership.
