= Ross Funcke =

Australian rules footballer, born 1977

Personal information
- Born: 16 November 1977 (age 48)
- Original team: Ballarat Under 18s / Minyip
- Debut: Round 6, 4 May 1996, Richmond vs. Fitzroy, at Western Oval

Playing career^{1}
Years	Club	Games (Goals)
1996–1999	Richmond	27 (1)
2001–2002	Melbourne	13 (4)
Total		40 (5)
- ^{1} Playing statistics correct to the end of 2002.

Ross Funcke (born 16 November 1977) is a former Australian rules footballer in the Australian Football League (AFL).

== Richmond career ==
Funcke was recruited to the Richmond Tigers in the 1995 AFL draft. Touted as a half-back player, he fulfilled that role for the Tigers, though not too impressively. At the end of the 1999 season Richmond delisted the then 21-year-old Funcke. It seemed that would be the end of his AFL career, but it was not.

== Melbourne career ==
In 2000 Funcke played in the Victorian Football League (VFL) with the North Ballarat Roosters and surprisingly was picked up by the Melbourne Football Club and given a lifeline at AFL level. By that time, Funcke was a tagger/run-with player and he was utilised accordingly in his debut season with Melbourne in 2001. After playing the first game in Round 1, 2001, he did not return to the side until Round 19, but performed solidly when he returned, and was impressive in Melbourne's Round 20 win over Sydney. He was retained in the side for the rest of the season, but in 2002 he had a poor year and was finally delisted.

== Post-AFL career ==
Funcke carved out a career with the Port Adelaide Magpies in the South Australian National Football League (SANFL) once his AFL career ended, and he became a valuable player for the club. Personal issues forced him home during the 2005 season.

In 2006, Funcke has signed on as a player-coach with Donald Football Club in the North Central Football League. He married his long-term partner Kellie in October 2006.
