= Craig Smoker =

Australian rules footballer

Personal information
- Full name: Craig Smoker
- Nicknames: Smokes, Choof
- Born: 4 April 1978 (age 48)
- Original team: Kulin/Kondinin
- Draft: 30th selection, 1995 draft
- Height: 174 cm (5 ft 9 in)
- Weight: 76 kg (168 lb)
- Position: Rover

Playing career^{1}
Years	Club	Games (Goals)
1996–1997	West Coast	0 (0)
1998–1999	Melbourne	17 (12)
Total		17 (12)
- ^{1} Playing statistics correct to the end of 1999.

Craig Smoker (born 4 April 1978) is a former Australian rules footballer who played with the West Coast Eagles and the Melbourne Football Club in the Australian Football League (AFL). After his AFL career ended, Smoker also played for Williamstown in the Victorian Football League (VFL) and West Perth in the Western Australian Football League (WAFL).

== Early life ==
Born on 4 April 1978, Smoker grew up on a farm outside the rural West Australian town of Kondinin. He played his junior football with Kulin/Kondinin, before moving to Perth and boarding at Scotch College. Smoker played school football for Scotch and represented Western Australia at the 1994 AFL Under 18 Championships (then named the Commonwealth Bank Cup).

== AFL career ==
=== West Coast ===
Smoker, a "rover in every sense of the word", was drafted by the West Coast Eagles with the 30th selection in the 1995 AFL draft. At 17 years of age, West Coast hoped that he would develop into a "top-line" player. In his first season, Smoker did not play an AFL match, instead spending the season in the WAFL playing for West Perth. He played 19 games in 1996 and kicked 26 goals. Smoker also spent his next season playing for West Perth. Smoker also pursued a career as an agricultural consultant during this time. Although he did not play a senior match for West Coast, Smoker did win West Perth's leading goalkicker award with 34 goals for the season. Due to his inability to get a game in a strong West Coast side and his good form for the Falcons, Smoker was the subject of trade interest from other AFL clubs at the end of 1997, with Melbourne emerging as his most likely destination. The Demons were said to be interested in his "pace and goalkicking ability".

=== Melbourne ===
Smoker was traded to Melbourne for the 34th selection in the 1997 AFL draft. Smoker made his AFL debut in the first round of the 1998 season. He played the first 14 of Melbourne's games, including a round 3 performance against Brisbane where he was matched against Jason Akermanis and received a Brownlow Medal vote and kicked four goals, two of which were in the last quarter. Smoker was dropped for the Demons' round 14 match against West Coast and named as an emergency. Smoker did end up playing in that match, but had a disappointing match against his old team, only having one disposal for the game. He was dropped for Melbourne's next game. He made his way back into the team for Melbourne's round 18 match against Brisbane and he played the following week against Carlton before being dropped again for round 20. While playing a reserves match, he was suspended one week for striking. Smoker did not play another senior game for Melbourne in 1998, although he was "on the edge of selection" during their finals campaign and was twice named as an emergency.

Following his 16 games in 1998, Smoker's 1999 season can only be described as a disappointment. Although occasionally named in Melbourne's squad of 25, he played only one senior game in Melbourne's "disasterous [sic] season". After a poor 1999, Smoker was delisted by the Demons at season's end as part of a "significant list turnover". He had played 17 games for Melbourne across two seasons.

== VFL career ==
After being delisted by Melbourne, Smoker began playing with Williamstown in the VFL. He played with the Seagulls for six season, from 2000 to 2005, totalling 94 senior VFL games. During his time with Williamstown, Smoker won a VFL premiership in 2003, was acting captain for a match in 2004 and won a reserves premiership in 2005, despite playing in the seniors for the majority of that season.

== WAFL career ==
After winning the VFL reserves premiership, Smoker returned to Western Australia to play for his old club, West Perth, for the 2006 season. Smoker played from West Perth from 2005 to 2009, playing his 100th game in his last season. During his time with West Perth he also worked for Underground Services. Retiring at the end of 2009, Smoker finished his WAFL career having played 105 games, for a return of 104 goals.
