= Steven Pitt (footballer) =

Australian rules footballer (born 1973)

Personal information
- Full name: Steven Winston Percy Pitt
- Born: 22 July 1973 (age 53)
- Original team: Norwood
- Draft: 77th overall, 1995 AFL draft 12th overall, 1997 Pre-season draft 11th overall, 1999 Pre-season draft
- Height: 188 cm (6 ft 2 in)
- Weight: 89 kg (196 lb)
- Position: Forward

Playing career^{1}
Years	Club	Games (Goals)
1996	Collingwood	13 (14)
2000–2001	Melbourne	5 (2)
Total		18 (16)
- ^{1} Playing statistics correct to the end of 2001.

Steven Pitt (born 22 July 1973) is a former Australian rules football player. Pitt played with the Melbourne Football Club and Collingwood Football Club in the Australian Football League (AFL). He also played for Norwood Football Club in the South Australian National Football League (SANFL).

== Early life ==
Pitt began playing senior SANFL football for Norwood in his late teens. As the SANFL is semi-professional, Pitt had a day job a police officer, but he continued to play senior and reserves football for Norwood.

== Collingwood ==
Despite having an average 1995 season for Norwood, playing the majority of his matches in the reserves, Pitt was selected in the 1995 AFL draft by Collingwood with the 77th and final selection in the Draft. At the age of 22, Collingwood's selection of Pitt was described as "a gamble" by The Age newspaper. Pitt made his AFL debut in the first round of the 1996 season and ended up playing 13 games in his first season and kicking 14 goals, 11 of them coming in three matches.

== Back to Norwood ==
Despite an impressive first AFL season, Pitt opted to leave Collingwood to go back to South Australia, to continue working as a police officer. Pitt continued to play with Norwood in the SANFL, after he moved back to South Australia. The Western Bulldogs drafted Pitt with the 12th selection in the 1997 Pre-season Draft, after Pitt played in Norwood's SANFL premiership winning team in the back pocket, however, Pitt didn't move back to Victoria and he failed to play a game for the Bulldogs. Pitt again drew the eye of AFL recruiters at the age of 26, when he won Norwood's best and fairest award for the 1999 season.

== Melbourne ==
The Demons drafted Pitt with the 11th selection in the 1999 Pre-season draft. Pitt had decided to give his AFL career another chance, as he felt that he had left Collingwood prematurely. Pitt's career with Melbourne, however, was much less successful. Pitt began the 2000 season with a shoulder injury and, despite showing good form with Melbourne's VFL-affiliate, Sandringham, Pitt only managed three games in his first season with the Demons, for a return of two goals. In 2001, Pitt could only manage two more senior matches and he was delisted by Melbourne at the end of the 2001 season, thereby ending his AFL career.

== Post-AFL career ==
Pitt returned to Norwood for the 2002 season and then moved to Salisbury North for the 2003 season.

Pitt regularly plays for the South Australian Police football team at the National Police Football Carnival, having played in 2003 and 2008.

Pitt was previously on the books for Tea Tree Gully Football Club in the South Australian Amateur Football League. In 2012, Pitt signed with Renmark in the Riverland Football League.
