= Troy Johnson (footballer) =

Australian rules footballer (born 1977)

Personal information
- Full name: Troy Johnson
- Born: 26 July 1977 (age 49)
- Original team: South Fremantle
- Draft: 42nd, 1995 AFL draft
- Height: 180 cm (5 ft 11 in)
- Weight: 75 kg (165 lb)

Playing career^{1}
Years	Club	Games (Goals)
1996	Brisbane Bears	2 (0)
- ^{1} Playing statistics correct to the end of 1996.

Troy Johnson (born 26 July 1977) is a former Australian rules footballer who played with the Brisbane Bears in the Australian Football League (AFL).

Johnson, a Fremantle Hawks junior, was a Western Australian representative in the AFL Under 18 Championships.

He was drafted by Brisbane from South Fremantle and made his AFL debut in the opening round of the 1996 season, against Footscray. The Bears won the game by 87 points, with Johnson contributing four disposals. He kept his spot in the team for the next round, which was against the West Coast Eagles back in his home state, but he didn't register a possession.

De-listed for disciplinary reasons, Johnson returned to South Fremantle and took part in their 1997 finals campaign. He nominated for the 1997 AFL draft and was chosen by Fremantle with pick 32, but would never play a senior game for them.
