= Ron Jacks (footballer) =

Australian rules footballer

Personal information
- Full name: Ron Jacks
- Born: 4 June 1949 (age 77)
- Original team: Subiaco
- Height: 180 cm (5 ft 11 in)
- Weight: 76 kg (168 lb)
- Position: Rover

Playing career^{1}
Years	Club	Games (Goals)
1973	Footscray	11 (5)
- ^{1} Playing statistics correct to the end of 1973.

Ron Jacks (born 4 June 1949) is a former Australian rules footballer who played with Subiaco in the West Australian Football League (WAFL) and Footscray in the Victorian Football League (VFL).
