= Gavin Mitchell (footballer) =

Australian rules footballer

Personal information
- Born: 28 December 1972 (age 53)
- Original team: West Kimberley / Claremont (WAFL)
- Draft: Zone Selection, 1995 AFL draft
- Height: 171 cm (5 ft 7 in)
- Weight: 74 kg (163 lb)
- Position: Rover

Playing career^{1}
Years	Club	Games (Goals)
1996–1997	Fremantle	36 (18)
1998–2000	St Kilda	52 (64)
- ^{1} Playing statistics correct to the end of 2000.

Gavin Mitchell (born 28 December 1972) is a former Australian rules footballer in the Australian Football League.

Known for his pace and goalsneak ability, Mitchell debuted with the Fremantle Dockers in 1996, a season where he played 21 matches. Despite having played for Claremont Football Club in the West Australian Football League in 1994 and 1995, the official AFL records list Mitchell as being drafted from West Kimberley, hence making him one of the few players to have been drafted from outside of the main state leagues. In 1997 he played 15 games but was traded to the St Kilda Football Club for 1998. He performed well for the Saints, playing 23 games for 22 goals, including a haul of four.

1999 saw a further improvement from the mustachioed Mitchell, where he booted 34 goals from 20 matches. In 2000, however, Mitchell fell out of favour. After a bag of 5 goals in the Round 1 loss to Sydney, his form tapered and he averaged only 8 disposals for a total of 1 goal over the next 5 games. This saw Mitchell dropped from the side, although he was recalled in Round 15. By then, the Saints were bottom of the ladder, with the midfield unable to supply Mitchell with enough crumbing opportunities. He failed to perform in his next two games, which turned out to be his last with the club. He was delisted at the end of the 2000 season.

Mitchell played three State games for Western Australia, in 1994, 1996 and 1998, all at Football Park against South Australia.
