= Kane Fraser =

Australian rules footballer

Personal information
- Full name: Kane Fraser
- Born: 22 July 1977 (age 49)
- Original team: Eastern Ranges
- Draft: 51st, 1995 National Draft
- Height: 185 cm (6 ft 1 in)
- Weight: 83 kg (183 lb)

Playing career^{1}
Years	Club	Games (Goals)
1996–1998	Hawthorn	5 (0)
- ^{1} Playing statistics correct to the end of 1998.

Kane Fraser (born 22 July 1977) is a former Australian rules footballer who played with Hawthorn in the Australian Football League (AFL).

Hawthorn selected Fraser with pick 51 of the 1995 National Draft, from TAC Cup side Eastern Ranges. He was originally from East Ringwood. A half back flanker, he made just five senior appearances for Hawthorn, over three seasons.
