= Darren O'Brien =

Australian rules footballer (born 1969)

Personal information
- Full name: Darren O'Brien
- Born: 22 March 1969 (age 57)
- Original team: West Perth
- Draft: 60th overall, 1995 National draft
- Height: 180 cm (5 ft 11 in)
- Weight: 80 kg (176 lb)
- Position: Midfielder

Playing career^{1}
Years	Club	Games (Goals)
1996–1997	Melbourne	24 (9)
- ^{1} Playing statistics correct to the end of 1997.

Career highlights
- Harold Ball Memorial Trophy: 1996

Darren O'Brien (born 22 March 1969) is a former Australian rules footballer who played for Melbourne Football Club in the Australian Football League (AFL) and for West Perth Football Club in the West Australian Football League (WAFL).

== Early career ==
Originally from Collie, Western Australia, O'Brien began his playing career with West Perth in the WAFL. He played 141 senior WAFL games from 1988 to 1995 (and a further 19 games in 1998) for a return of 83 goals and, after winning a WAFL Grand Final with West Perth in 1995, he became the subject of interest from AFL clubs, despite being 26 years old. Known as centreman with a penetrating left foot kick, O'Brien was drafted by Melbourne with the 60th selection in the 1995 National draft, in what was described as the "surprise of the draft because of his age" by The Age. The Demons' football manager, Richard Griffiths, said the club was "very pleased with ... the experience of O'Brien" and Rohan Connolly wrote that he was "rated highly by good judges" and "possibly ready-made [for AFL]". After being selected, O'Brien agreed to move to Melbourne from his native Perth.

== AFL career ==
With Melbourne's best midfielder, Todd Viney, leaving the club during the 1996 pre-season, O'Brien, due to his experience, was expected to help fill the void left by Viney in the Demons' midfield. O'Brien played his first game for the Demons in Melbourne's first match of the year, a pre-season game against Adelaide. His second match for Melbourne, also a pre-season game, was impressive, kicking three goals in a 14-point victory. At the beginning of the home and away season, O'Brien was named in Melbourne's best 21 players and described as their "rookie to watch" by Ashley Browne in The Age. O'Brien was named in squad to play Collingwood in round 2, but the coaching staff were reluctant to play him "because of his lack of pace" and he did not make the final team. Instead, O'Brien played in the reserves and was reported. His hearing at the AFL tribunal was the first heard to be heard by a female member; he was not suspended. O'Brien made his AFL debut in round 4 against Carlton. He had a mediocre performance, gathering five possessions and laying five tackles. O'Brien remained in the side for the next three matches, all of which Melbourne lost, and he was dropped back to the reserves after a 10 disposal game against Sydney. He was recalled to the seniors for round 13 where he recorded his first win at AFL level, despite a poor performance personally. O'Brien subsequently established himself as a regular in the side, missing only one game for the rest of the season, round 20, due to a hamstring injury. Often used in a tagging role, such as against Brownlow Medal winner Paul Couch, O'Brien was also attacking offensively, kicking seven goals in a six-week period, amassing 27 possessions in a round 18 match against Sydney and being named in Melbourne's best players in their round 19 clash with Carlton.

After playing in Melbourne's first pre-season match of 1997, O'Brien was unable to hold his place in the senior side and was dropped back to the reserves. Playing in the reserves, O'Brien injured his knee and missed a month of football as a result. Despite winning Melbourne's 'Best First Year Player' award in 1996, O'Brien did not play a senior match in 1997 until round 8 against Geelong. He remained in the team until being omitted for round 15, but was back in the side the very next week. Dropped again for round 17, O'Brien made his way back into the seniors for round 20, finishing off the season with three consecutive games. Despite playing 24 of a possible 44 matches for Melbourne in his two years at the club, the 28-year-old O'Brien was delisted by the Demons at the conclusion of the 1997 season.

== Back to the WAFL ==
After being delisted, O'Brien nominated for the 1997 National draft, but was not selected by any of the clubs, thereby ending his AFL career. O'Brien then signed with his old side, West Perth, and played with the Falcons for the 1998 WAFL season. He played 19 games and kicked 14 goals in what was his last season in the WAFL.
