= Shane Clayton =

Australian rules footballer

Personal information
- Full name: Shane Clayton
- Born: 24 October 1978 (age 48)
- Original team: Northern Knights
- Draft: 16th overall, 1995 National Draft; 90th overall, 1998 National Draft
- Height: 186 cm (6 ft 1 in)
- Weight: 87 kg (192 lb)

Playing career^{1}
Years	Club	Games (Goals)
1996	Fitzroy	13 (1)
1997–1998	Brisbane Lions	5 (0)
1999–2004	Kangaroos	99 (51)
Total		117 (52)
- ^{1} Playing statistics correct to the end of 2004.

Career highlights
- AFL Premiership player: 1999

Shane Clayton (born 24 October 1978) is a former Australian rules footballer who played for Fitzroy Football Club, the Brisbane Lions and the Kangaroos in the Australian Football League (AFL), including their victorious 1999 Grand Final.

Originally from the Northern Knights, Clayton debuted in the AFL for Fitzroy with whom he appeared 13 times. Clayton was one of eight players to transfer to Brisbane when Fitzroy's AFL operations were taken over by the Brisbane Bears, and he played five games with Brisbane over two seasons before moving to the Kangaroos.

== Statistics ==
Legend
G	Goals	K	Kicks	D	Disposals	T	Tackles
B	Behinds	H	Handballs	M	Marks

Season	Team	No.	Games	Totals							Averages (per game)						
Season	Team	No.	Games	G	B	K	H	D	M	T	G	B	K	H	D	M	T
1996	Fitzroy	40	13	1	1	87	53	140	34	9	0.1	0.1	6.7	4.1	10.8	2.6	0.7
1997	Brisbane Lions	40	3	0	0	8	4	12	3	1	0.0	0.0	2.7	1.3	4.0	1.0	0.3
1998	Brisbane Lions	40	2	0	0	9	4	13	4	4	0.0	0.0	4.5	2.0	6.5	2.0	2.0
1999	Kangaroos	23	25	10	12	177	75	252	74	33	0.4	0.5	7.1	3.0	10.1	3.0	1.3
2000	Kangaroos	23	24	8	11	264	120	384	108	34	0.3	0.5	11.0	5.0	16.0	4.5	1.4
2001	Kangaroos	23	20	15	8	163	82	245	70	23	0.8	0.4	8.2	4.1	12.3	3.5	1.2
2002	Kangaroos	23	16	17	12	153	58	211	66	16	1.1	0.8	9.6	3.6	13.2	4.1	1.0
2003	Kangaroos	23	13	1	2	105	65	170	56	8	0.1	0.2	8.1	5.0	13.1	4.3	0.6
2004	Kangaroos	23	1	0	0	1	0	1	1	0	0.0	0.0	1.0	0.0	1.0	1.0	0.0
Career			117	52	46	967	461	1428	416	128	0.4	0.4	8.3	3.9	12.2	3.6	1.1
