= Brendon Fewster =

Australian rules footballer

Personal information
- Full name: Brendon Maxwell Fewster
- Born: 4 January 1974 (age 52)
- Original team: West Perth (WAFL)
- Debut: Round 1, 1996, West Coast vs. Fremantle, at Subiaco Oval

Playing career^{1}
Years	Club	Games (Goals)
1996–1999	West Coast	33 (27)
2000–2002	Fremantle	37 (16)
Total		70 (43)
- ^{1} Playing statistics correct to the end of 2002.

Brendon Maxwell Fewster (born 4 January 1974) is an Australian rules footballer. He played for both the West Coast Eagles and the Fremantle Football Club in the AFL and West Perth in the WAFL, mainly as a full forward.

He was drafted from West Perth to the Eagles with the 3rd selection in the 1995 AFL draft after Clive Waterhouse and Matthew Primus. During four seasons at West Coast he struggled to maintain a place in the side, playing only 33 games, with no more than 14 in a season. At the end of the 1999 season, he was traded to Fremantle in return for the 16th selection in the 1999 AFL draft, which the Eagles used to draft David Haynes. After a career high 20 games in 2000, Fewster again struggled to maintain his position in the AFL and was delisted by Fremantle at the end of the 2002 season.

Fewster continued to play for West Perth in the WAFL until the end of the 2005 season, when he retired having played over 100 games for the Falcons, including three premierships in 1995, 1999 and 2003. In 2004 he was named at full forward of West Perth's Team of the Decade.
