= Nick Gelavis =

Australian rules footballer

Personal information
- Full name: Nikolas Gelavis
- Born: 15 June 1929 (age 97); Kalgoorlie
- Original team: Subiaco
- Height: 165 cm (5 ft 5 in)
- Weight: 67 kg (148 lb)
- Position: Rover

Playing career^{1}
Years	Club	Games (Goals)
1949–51	Subiaco (WAFL)	37 (9)
1953–54	South Melbourne	15 (16)
1954	Footscray	4 (0)
1955	Sandringham (VFA)	8 (10)
- ^{1} Playing statistics correct to the end of 1955.

Nikolas Gelavis (born 15 June 1929) is a former Australian rules footballer who played with Footscray in the Victorian Football League (VFL).

== Family ==
The son of Johannes "John" Gelavis (1898-1947), and Stavroula Gelavis (1908-2005), née Sarinas, Nikolas Gelavis was born in Kalgoorlie on 15 June 1929.

== Football ==
=== Subiaco (WAFL) ===
Gelavis began his senior career with Subiaco in the West Australian Football League (WAFL) and played from 1949 to 1951.

=== South Melbourne (VFL) ===
He was cleared from Subiaco to South Melbourne in 1952, and made his senior VFL debut in 1953.

=== Footscray (VFL) ===
Having not played a senior game for South Melbourne that season, Gelavis was cleared to Footscray on 12 June 1954. He played his first match for the Footscray First XVIII, against St Kilda, on 10 July 1954.

=== Sandringham (VFA) ===
In 1955 Gelavis moved to Sandringham in the Victorian Football Association.

=== Devonport (NWFU) ===
A mid-season job as a radio announcer in Tasmania led to Gelavis being given a clearance from Sandringham to Devonport in the North West Football Union (NWFU) competition.

On 12 May 1956 Gelavis represented the NWFU in an intrastate match against the Northern Tasmanian Football Association and was named among the best players.
