= Craig Treleven =

Australian rules footballer

Personal information
- Full name: Craig Michael Treleven
- Born: 14 June 1970 (age 56)
- Original team: Esperance (EDFA)
- Debut: Round 1, 1996, Hawthorn vs. Fitzroy, at Western Oval
- Height: 188 cm (6 ft 2 in)
- Weight: 86 kg (190 lb)

Playing career^{1}
| Years | Club | Games (Goals) |
| 1992–1995 & 2002-2003 | East Fremantle | 120 (62) |
| 1996–2000 | Hawthorn | 78 (22) |
| Total | | 198 (84) |
- ^{1} Playing statistics correct to the end of 2003.

Career highlights
- Sandover Medal: 1995; Simpson Medal: 1995

Craig 'Jock' Treleven (born 14 June 1970) is a former Australian rules footballer who played with Hawthorn in the Australian Football League (AFL).

A ruck-rover, Treleven was recruited to Hawthorn after an impressive season for Western Australian Football League (WAFL) club East Fremantle in 1995. That season he had won both a Sandover Medal and Simpson Medal, the latter as Western Australia's best player in their interstate match against Queensland. Hawthorn acquired his services with pick 16 in the 1996 pre-season draft and he spent five seasons with the club before leaving and returning home to finish his career in the WAFL.
