= Eric Sarich =

Australian rules footballer and coach

Personal information
- Full name: Eric Sarich
- Born: 22 February 1941 (age 85)
- Height: 180 cm (5 ft 11 in)
- Weight: 84 kg (185 lb)

Playing career^{1}
Years	Club	Games (Goals)
1960–61	South Fremantle	6 (4)
1962–64	Swan Districts	39 (47)
1965–68, 1971	South Melbourne	62 (38)
1969–70	East Fremantle	17 (8)
1970	Subiaco	14 (5)
- ^{1} Playing statistics correct to the end of 1971.

Eric Sarich (born 22 February 1941) is a former Australian rules footballer who played with South Melbourne in the Victorian Football League (VFL). He also played for four clubs in the West Australian National Football League (WANFL).

Sarich, a wingman and half forward, was a noted tagger throughout his career which began at South Fremantle in 1960. He struggled to get games in his two seasons and transferred to Swan Districts in 1962, after being lured by coach Haydn Bunton. He played at Swan Districts for three seasons before moving to Victoria to take up an offer from Fitzroy. His deal with Fitzroy fell apart at the last minute and he instead found himself at South Melbourne where he would play beside Bob Skilton.

With South Melbourne, Sarich managed a four-goal haul against Melbourne in just his third VFL game and from 1966 to 1968 he was a regular fixtures in the seniors, something he had struggled to do in the WANFL.

He returned home in 1969 after accepting an offer to captain-coach East Fremantle, who were coming off their worst season since the club's debut in 1898. He did not play until the seventh round because Swan Districts still had a legitimate hold on his services and East Fremantle had to pay a transfer fee of $5,000. Nonetheless, Old Easts improved on their efforts of the previous season by winning eight games under Sarich in the 1969 season but were still four wins plus percentage from playing finals. When the 1970 season fell away after a big opening win, Sarich was sacked as coach and cleared to Subiaco – only one month after he had captained the winning team in an interstate trial match. The following year he rejoined South Melbourne for one final season.
