= Joe McLaren =

Australian rules footballer

Personal information
- Full name: Joe McLaren
- Born: 11 December 1977 (age 48)
- Original team: Geelong Falcons
- Draft: 22nd, 1995 AFL draft
- Height: 187 cm (6 ft 2 in)
- Weight: 82 kg (181 lb)

Playing career^{1}
| Years | Club | Games (Goals) |
| 1996–2000 | St Kilda | 57 (33) |
| 2001 | Kangaroos | 12 (6) |
| Total | | 69 (39) |
- ^{1} Playing statistics correct to the end of 2001.

Joe McLaren (born 11 December 1977) is a former Australian rules footballer who played with St Kilda and the Kangaroos in the Australian Football League (AFL).

McLaren, a wingman, was recruited from the Geelong Falcons but came from Koroit originally. The 22nd pick of the 1995 AFL draft, he was a member of St Kilda's 1996 Ansett Cup winning side and played 11 games in the 1996 league season. St Kilda went on to make the AFL grand final in 1997 but McLaren only took part in the first two rounds of the season. He played finals football in 1998 and then had his best season in 1999, when he did not miss a single game. Rewarded with a seventh placing in the Trevor Barker Medal count, McLaren had taken 114 marks, kicked 21 goals and had 365 disposals over the course of the year.

After a disappointing season in 2000, McLaren was traded to the Kangaroos, in a straight swap with Matthew Capuano. He kicked two goals on debut for his new club against Richmond, but made only 11 more appearances.

In 2003 and 2004, McLaren played for South Fremantle in the West Australian Football League.

He returned to Koroit and won the 2005 Maskell Medal, given to the best and fairest player each Hampden Football League season. Having participated in their 2007 premiership team, McLaren was made coach in 2008 and steered Koroit to another premiership the following year.
