= Peter Berbakov =

Australian rules footballer

Personal information
- Full name: Peter Berbakov
- Born: 22 August 1973 (age 53)
- Original team: Sunbury / Glenelg
- Draft: 58th, 1995 National Draft
- Height: 188 cm (6 ft 2 in)
- Weight: 90 kg (198 lb)

Playing career^{1}
Years	Club	Games (Goals)
1996–1999	Essendon	52 (14)
- ^{1} Playing statistics correct to the end of 1999.

Peter Berbakov (born 22 August 1973) is a former Australian rules footballer who played with Essendon in the Australian Football League (AFL).

Berbakov was from Sunbury originally and played Under-19s football for Essendon during the early 1990s. Unable to make it onto the senior list, he went to South Australia and began playing for Glenelg. He returned to Essendon via the 1995 National Draft, having been invited by his Glenelg coach Mark Williams, who had joined Essendon as an assistant coach. After a strong season in the reserves, Berbakov was selected regularly in the 1996 AFL season, as a key defender. He had a career highlight in the opening round of the 1997 AFL season when he played forward and kicked four goals against Carlton.

He badly injured an ankle in 1999 and missed the second half of the season as a result. In 2000, he wasn't able to push his way back into the team, who would lose just once all season, resulting in his delisting.

He has previously held coaching roles at Essendon and the Sydney Swans.
