= Jason Bevan =

Australian rules footballer

Personal information
- Full name: Jason Scott Bevan
- Born: 18 April 1978
- Died: 7 October 2017 (aged 39)
- Original team: South Adelaide
- Draft: 71st, 1995 AFL draft
- Height: 180 cm (5 ft 11 in)
- Weight: 78 kg (172 lb)

Playing career^{1}
Years	Club	Games (Goals)
1996	Collingwood	2 (0)
- ^{1} Playing statistics correct to the end of 1996.

Jason Scott Bevan (18 April 1978 – 7 October 2017) was an Australian rules footballer who played with Collingwood in the Australian Football League (AFL).

Bevan was a midfielder, who Collingwood secured in the 1995 AFL draft. His two appearances in the 1996 AFL season where in Collingwood's round 15 win over eventual premiers North Melbourne and their win against Fitzroy the following round.
