= Neil Marshall (footballer) =

Australian rules footballer

Personal information
- Full name: Neil Peter Marshall
- Born: 6 July 1977 (age 49)
- Original team: Towns (Broome)
- Draft: 66th, 1995 AFL draft
- Height: 182 cm (6 ft 0 in)
- Weight: 80 kg (176 lb)

Playing career^{1}
Years	Club	Games (Goals)
1995–1998	Claremont	52 (10)
1997–1998	West Coast Eagles	4 (0)
1999–2005	Subiaco	82 (63)
Total		138 (73)
- ^{1} Playing statistics correct to the end of 2005.

Neil Peter Marshall (born 6 July 1977) is a former Australian rules footballer who played with the West Coast Eagles in the Australian Football League (AFL).

Marshall, an Indigenous Australian, was a half back flanker who came from Broome originally. He was picked up in the 1995 AFL draft but didn't play a senior game for the Eagles in 1996, instead playing in Claremont's premiership team.

Against Sydney in 1997, at the SCG, he made his league debut and was solid with 13 disposals. He played only once more that year, against Melbourne and in 1998 added just two further games to his tally, participating in wins over Collingwood and Fremantle.

A two time Western Australian interstate representative, Marshall finished his career with Subiaco.
