= Craig Nettelbeck =

Australian rules footballer

Personal information
- Full name: Craig Nettelbeck
- Born: 26 May 1972 (age 54)
- Original team: Leeton
- Height: 193 cm (6 ft 4 in)
- Weight: 96 kg (212 lb)

Playing career^{1}
Years	Club	Games (Goals)
1990–1994	Sydney Swans	45 (27)
1995	Fremantle	0 (0)
1996–1998	Melbourne	33 (15)
Total		78 (42)
- ^{1} Playing statistics correct to the end of 1997.

Craig Nettelbeck (born 26 May 1972) is a former Australian rules footballer who played with the Sydney Swans and Melbourne in the Australian Football League (AFL).

Nettelbeck was signed by Sydney in 1989, from the Leeton Football Club in the New South Wales Riverina and would be used by the Swans both as a full-back and forward. He was delisted by Sydney after making just two appearances in each of the 1993 and 1994 seasons.

Drafted by Fremantle, Nettelbeck moved to Western Australia in 1995 and took part in Fremantle's first official fixture, an Ansett Cup match against St Kilda. He was unable however to make an appearance for Fremantle in the AFL and spent the season in the West Australian Football League with East Perth, playing nine games and kicking 19 goals.

Melbourne selected Nettelbeck in the 1996 Pre-season Draft, with the second overall selection and he played 20 games for them in his first season. He was troubled by a shoulder injury in 1997 and played only reserves football in 1998.

Nettelbeck attempted to join his fourth club, the Western Bulldogs, in 1999 but was badly injured during a pre-season intra-club match.

After his retirement from the sport he became a sports agent.
