= Tristan Lynch =

Australian rules footballer

Personal information
- Full name: Tristan Lynch
- Born: 22 August 1973 (age 53)
- Original team: Sale (LVFL)
- Draft: 85th, 1992 AFL draft
- Height: 188 cm (6 ft 2 in)
- Weight: 80 kg (176 lb)

Playing career^{1}
Years	Club	Games (Goals)
1996	Brisbane Bears	21 (1)
1997–1998	Brisbane Lions	34 (7)
1999–2000	Geelong	17 (7)
Total		72 (15)
- ^{1} Playing statistics correct to the end of 2000.

Tristan Lynch (born 22 August 1973) is a former Australian rules footballer who played with the Brisbane Bears, Brisbane Lions and Geelong in the Australian Football League (AFL).

Lynch spent most of his career as a defender but was also used as a tagger on occasions. From Sale, he was initially recruited by Collingwood, with pick 85 in the 1992 AFL draft, before ending up at Richmond in 1994. He played reserves football with Richmond for two seasons and when the club's senior coach John Northey resigned and went to the Brisbane Bears in 1996, Lynch joined him.

Aged 22, Lynch made his belated AFL debut in 1996 with the Bears and appeared in all three finals that they played that year, including the preliminary final where he had 16 disposals. Despite finally breaking into the AFL, Lynch was forced to change clubs again when the Bears merged with Fitzroy. He was a regular fixture in the Brisbane Lions team in 1997 but added further games in 1998. Along with Scott Bamford, Lynch was traded by Brisbane to Geelong after the 1998 season, in return for Martin McKinnon. He was at Geelong for two seasons before being delisted.
