= Peter Bennett (footballer, born 1956) =

Australian rules footballer

Personal information
- Full name: Peter Keith Bennett
- Born: 8 November 1956 (age 69); New Zealand
- Original team: Pakenham
- Height: 180 cm (5 ft 11 in)
- Weight: 70 kg (154 lb)

Playing career^{1}
Years	Club	Games (Goals)
1976–1977	Hawthorn	13 (5)
1978–1981	Essendon	67 (22)
1982	Subiaco	1 (0)
- ^{1} Playing statistics correct to the end of 1981.

Peter Keith Bennett (born 8 November 1956) is a former Australian rules footballer who played with Hawthorn and Essendon in the Victorian Football League (VFL).

New Zealand born Bennett was a utility player, often used as a ruck-rover. He was recruited from Pakenham and put together 13 games in his two seasons at Hawthorn. He made more regular appearances when he crossed to Essendon, starting with 14 games in 1978, from which he averaged 18 disposals. The following season he was Essendon's leading ball getter, with 530 disposals, from 23 games. He was a member of the Essendon team which won the 1981 night premiership.

Bennett joined the Subiaco Football Club in 1982 but would be in Western Australia for just the one season. He played for Koo Wee Rup in 1983, as captain-coach. From 1984 to 1986 he captain-coached Gembrook, winning a premiership in the last of those years.
