= Mark West (footballer) =

Australian rules footballer

Personal information
- Full name: Mark West
- Born: 3 April 1973 (age 53)
- Original team: South Adelaide
- Draft: 43rd, 1995 AFL draft
- Height: 180 cm (5 ft 11 in)
- Weight: 92 kg (203 lb)

Playing career^{1}
Years	Club	Games (Goals)
1996–1998	Footscray/W.B.	16 (3)
- ^{1} Playing statistics correct to the end of 1998.

Mark West (born 3 April 1973) is a former Australian rules footballer who played with the Western Bulldogs in the Australian Football League (AFL) during the 1990s.

An Indigenous Australian, West was from the Northern Territory and played with Darwin before embarking on a football journey which would see him play in three states. He joined the Brisbane Bears in 1991 and played reserves football at the club for two seasons before continuing his career in South Australia with South Adelaide.

He was recruited from South Adelaide to the AFL, with Footscray using the 43rd selection in the 1995 draft to secure his services. The dreadlocked West was already 23 when he made his senior AFL debut in 1996 and made only four appearances in his debut season.

He struggled to make much of an impact in 1997 until the finals series, with a career high 24 disposals and two goals coming in the preliminary final loss to Adelaide. With just under three minutes remaining, West received a handball inside the forward 50 and had a running shot at goal which missed to the left. Had he kicked the goal, the Bulldogs would have gone eight points up.

West missed most of the 1998 AFL season with a shoulder injury but recovered in time to play in another preliminary final, where his club was again defeated by Adelaide.

He contested the 2004 federal election as the Family First candidate for the seat of Solomon, receiving 2.1% of the vote.
