= Brent Frewen =

Australian rules footballer

Personal information
- Full name: Brent Frewen
- Born: 20 October 1977 (age 49)
- Original teams: South Mildura, (Sunraysia FL)
- Draft: No. 4, 1996 Pre-season Draft (Fitzroy); No. 72, 1996 AFL draft (Richmond)

Playing career^{1}
Years	Club	Games (Goals)
1996	Fitzroy	2 (0)
- ^{1} Playing statistics correct to the end of 1996.

Brent Frewen (born 20 October 1977) is a former Australian rules footballer who played for Fitzroy in the Australian Football League (AFL) in 1996. He was recruited from the South Mildura Football Club in the Sunraysia Football League with the 4th selection in the 1996 Pre-season Draft. He was Fitzroy's final ever selection in an AFL Draft. After Fitzroy's AFL operations were taken over by the Brisbane Bears to form the Brisbane Lions, he was recruited by Richmond in the 1996 AFL draft, but never played a senior game for Richmond, being delisted at the end of the 1997 season.
