= Andrew McLean (footballer) =

Australian rules footballer

Personal information
- Full name: Andrew McLean
- Born: 18 July 1973 (age 53)
- Original teams: North Launceston, (TFL)
- Draft: No. 6, 1996 Pre-season Draft
- Positions: Ruck, Center Half Back

Playing career^{1}
Years	Club	Games (Goals)
1996	St Kilda	6 (1)
- ^{1} Playing statistics correct to the end of 1996.

Career highlights
- SATIS Premiership Coach 2018-2019

Andrew McLean (born 18 July 1973) is a former Australian rules footballer who played for St Kilda in the Australian Football League (AFL) in 1996. He was recruited from the North Launceston Football Club in the Tasmanian Football League (TFL) with the 6th selection in the 1996 Pre-season Draft. Mclean also played for the Norwood Football Club in the SANFL and won a mail medal at the Encounter Bay Football Club in 2004. McLean is now part of the Scotch Oakburn College Australian Rules Football coaching panel, and has since lead this team to multiple premierships in 2018 and 2019 over The Hutchins School.
