= Daniel Healy =

Australian rules footballer

Personal information
- Born: 3 May 1974 (age 52)
- Original team: Central District
- Debut: Round 3, 1994, St Kilda vs. West Coast, at Subiaco Oval

Playing career^{1}
Years	Club	Games (Goals)
1996–1999	St Kilda	38 (24)
2000–2005	Central District	135
- ^{1} Playing statistics correct to the end of 2005.

Career highlights
- 5x SANFL Premiership player: (2000, 2001, 2003, 2004, 2005); 4x SANFL Premiership captain: (2001, 2003, 2004, 2005); Central District captain: (2001-2005); Gardiner Medal: (1999)

Daniel Healy (born 3 May 1974) is a former Australian rules footballer, who played for St Kilda in the Australian Football League and for Central District in the South Australian National Football League. Healy was taken in the first round, pick number 6 overall, of the 1995 AFL draft, and made his debut against West Coast in Round 12 1996. In this match he scored one goal and this was the only game he played during the year. In the 1997 AFL season, Healy became a regular starter and played 15 games, scoring 5 goals.

Healy played in 15 of 22 matches in the 1997 AFL Premiership Season home and away rounds in which St Kilda Football Club qualified in first position for the 1997 AFL Finals Series, winning the club’s 2nd Minor Premiership and 1st McClelland Trophy.

He played the same number of games again in the 1998 AFL season, scoring 14 goals for the year.

In 1999 he played just 7 games, scoring 4 goals and was delisted at the end of the year. He returned to South Australia to play for Central District in the SANFL.

He played in Central's 2000 SANFL premiership team, and was then appointed captain for the 2001 season. With the team dominating the SANFL, Healy became a five-time Premiership player (2000, 2001, 2003, 2004, 2005). Four of these times Healy was captain of the side, although he missed out in 2002. He retired at the end of 2005 season, playing a total of 135 games for centrals.

In 2008, Healy was the development manager in the new Alan Scott power development academy for the Port Adelaide Football Club.

At the end of 2008, he took up the 2009 coaching job at the North Adelaide Roosters which ended when he was sacked by the club at the end of the 2010 season. They made an elimination final in his first year but finished seventh in 2010. He later returned to Port Adelaide as a coach.

Daniel is now a facilitator at Leading Teams.
