= Daniel Parker (footballer) =

Australian rules footballer (born 1974)

Personal information
- Born: 25 May 1974 (age 52); Perth, Western Australia
- Original team: Subiaco (WAFL)
- Debut: Round 14, 1996, Fremantle vs. St Kilda, at Subiaco

Playing career^{1}
Years	Club	Games (Goals)
1996–1999	Fremantle	25 (18)
- ^{1} Playing statistics correct to the end of 1999.

Daniel Parker (born 25 May 1974) is an Australian rules footballer who played for the Fremantle Dockers between 1996 and 1999. He was drafted from Subiaco in the WAFL as a predraft selection in the 1995 AFL draft and played mainly as a key position player.

The much taller brother of Fremantle games record holder Shane Parker, Daniel struggled to hold his position in the side. His 25 games at the club over 4 seasons saw him play both in the forward and backlines, but inconsistent form saw him delisted at the end of the 1999 season.
