= Matthew Primus =

Australian rules footballer (born 1975)

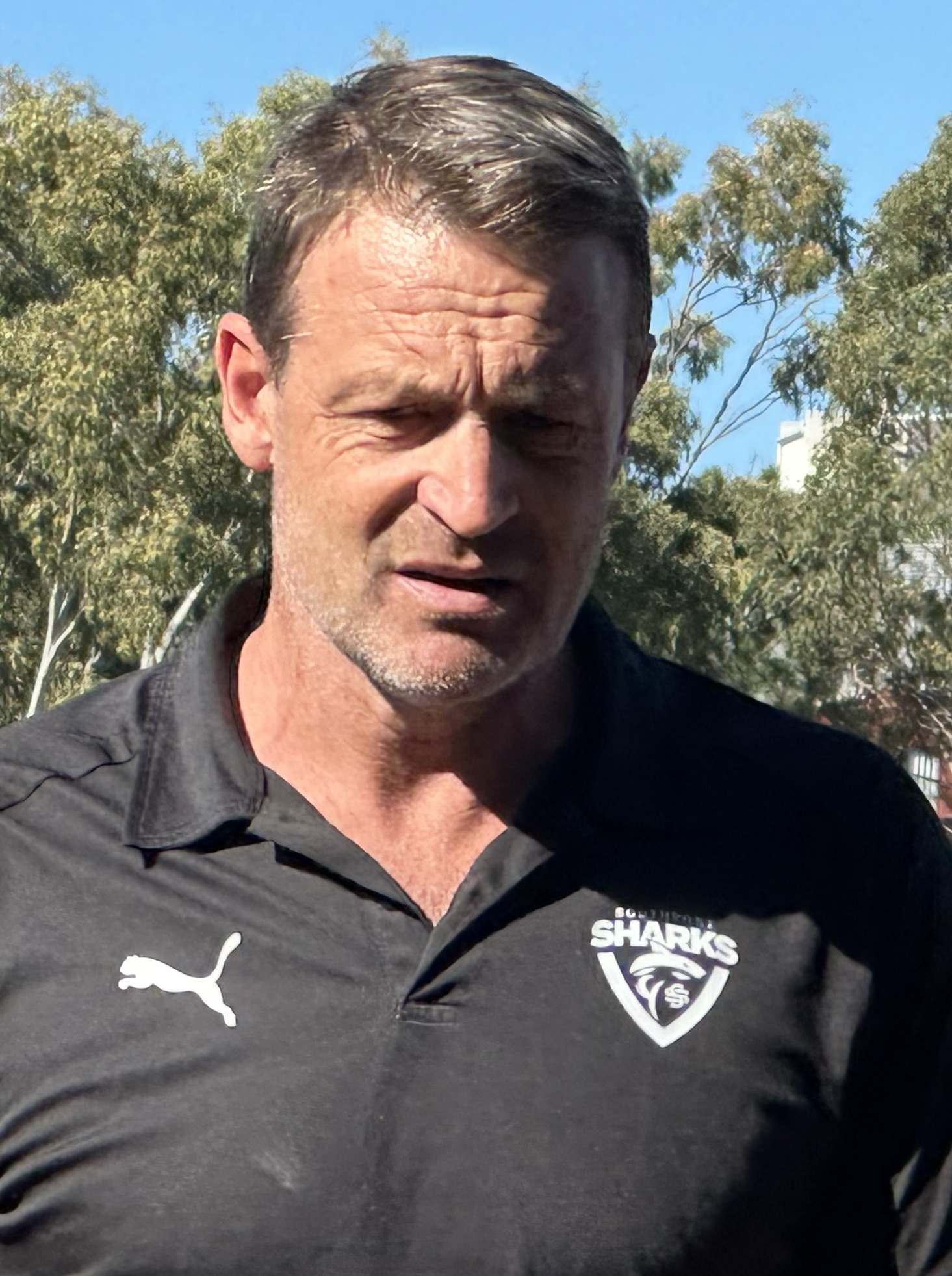
- Primus coaching Southport in 2026

Personal information
- Full name: Matthew Richard Primus
- Born: 12 January 1975 (age 51); Geelong, Victoria
- Original team: Geelong Falcons (TAC Cup)/Norwood Football Club (SANFL)
- Draft: No. 2, 1995 National Draft, Fitzroy
- Height: 197 cm (6 ft 6 in)
- Weight: 109 kg (240 lb)
- Position: Ruckman

Playing career^{1}
Years	Club	Games (Goals)
1996	Fitzroy	20 (5)
1997–2005	Port Adelaide	137 (76)
Total		157 (81)

International team honours^{2}
Years	Team	Games (Goals)
2002	Australia	2

Coaching career^{3}
Years	Club	Games (W–L–D)
2010–2012	Port Adelaide	47 (13–34–0) 27.66%
- ^{1} Playing statistics correct to the end of 2005.^{2} Representative statistics correct as of 2002.^{3} Coaching statistics correct as of 2012.

Career highlights
- John Cahill Medal (2002); Port Adelaide Captain (2001–2005); All-Australian Team (2001, 2002); AFL Rising Star nominee (1996)

Matthew Richard Primus (born 12 January 1975) is an Australian rules football coach and former player. He has served as the head coach of the Southport Sharks in the Victorian Football League (VFL) since 2025.

Primus previously played for, captained and later coached the Port Adelaide Football Club. He was also an assistant coach at the Gold Coast Suns from 2013 until 2018.

== Playing career ==
=== Fitzroy career ===
==== Early career (1996) ====
Primus began his career with the Fitzroy Football Club in what was to be their final season in the AFL. At the end of the season, he had played 20 games and kicked five goals, becoming one of their key players. Primus signed with the Port Adelaide Football Club as an uncontracted zone player during their AFL establishment in 1996.

=== Port Adelaide career ===
==== Career high (1997–2002) ====
After finishing second in Fitzroy’s 1996 best and fairest and in the same position in Port Adelaide's 1997 best and fairest, Primus had established himself as one of the game's top ruckmen, but his close losses in the best and fairest counts would be a pointer to the bad luck he would face later in his career. 1999 saw Primus play only two games before a serious knee injury ruled him out for the year, yet the Power managed to improve on their combined record of 19–23–2 to reach seventh position. As his star rose as a player, Primus was also getting noticed off the field, being voted Cleo Magazine's ”Most Eligible Bachelor" in 1998. After the Power had a disappointing season in 2000, Primus was promoted to captain of the club in 2001, and led the team to a minor premiership in 2002 with only two losses in their last twenty home-and-away games before lack of finals experience told.

==== Injuries (2003–2004) ====
In 2003 Primus was hampered by hamstring and knee injuries, and only played nine games. The worst was yet to come, however, and 2004 would be the ultimate heartbreak for Primus. In his return game in Round 3, he suffered an ACL rupture after his left knee bent the wrong way, requiring a knee reconstruction and putting him out of the game for the rest of the 2004 season. Warren Tredrea took over the captaincy, and after plenty of near-misses in the finals, Port Adelaide would go on to win the premiership that year, with Primus missing out.

==== Final season (2005) ====
In 2005, Primus made another return to the AFL. His form was not indicative of the Primus of old, however, and it seemed Port were playing Primus out of respect that he was the captain. Not only that, but Port Adelaide were not the same strong side they were just a year earlier. While they eventually had a few results go their way and managed to scrape into the finals, Primus injured his knee again in the final round of the home-and-away season. He was expected to miss only the finals series at first, but later scans revealed that he would require a third knee reconstruction. The likelihood that he would not be able to play until 2007 meant Primus announced his retirement from the AFL at the age of 30.

== Statistics ==
Legend
G	Goals	K	Kicks	D	Disposals	T	Tackles
B	Behinds	H	Handballs	M	Marks	H/O	Hit-outs

Season	Team	No.	Games	Totals								Averages (per game)								Votes
Season	Team	No.	Games	G	B	K	H	D	M	T	H/O	G	B	K	H	D	M	T	H/O	Votes
1996	Fitzroy	12	20	5	7	163	137	300	61	41	339	0.3	0.4	8.2	6.9	15.0	3.1	2.1	17.0	2
1997	Port Adelaide	2	22	6	1	179	89	268	74	38	255	0.3	0.0	8.1	4.0	12.2	3.4	1.7	11.6	9
1998	Port Adelaide	2	18	4	2	105	128	233	55	34	289	0.2	0.1	5.8	7.1	12.9	3.1	1.9	16.1	4
1999	Port Adelaide	2	2	1	0	9	5	14	4	1	28	0.5	0.0	4.5	2.5	7.0	2.0	0.5	14.0	0
2000	Port Adelaide	2	21	12	8	124	163	287	79	45	315	0.6	0.4	5.9	7.8	13.7	3.8	2.1	15.0	5
2001	Port Adelaide	1	22	9	5	137	156	293	85	60	488	0.4	0.2	6.2	7.1	13.3	3.9	2.7	22.2	10
2002	Port Adelaide	1	24	23	8	140	180	320	91	75	490	1.0	0.3	5.8	7.5	13.3	3.8	3.1	20.4	9
2003	Port Adelaide	1	9	5	1	34	27	61	22	15	111	0.6	0.1	3.8	3.0	6.8	2.4	1.7	12.3	0
2004	Port Adelaide	1	1	4	1	7	5	12	5	5	11	4.0	1.0	7.0	5.0	12.0	5.0	5.0	11.0	0
2005	Port Adelaide	1	18	12	10	87	87	174	50	35	289	0.7	0.6	4.8	4.8	9.7	2.8	1.9	16.1	2
Career			157	81	43	985	977	1962	526	349	2615	0.5	0.3	6.3	6.2	12.5	3.4	2.2	16.7	41

== Coaching career ==
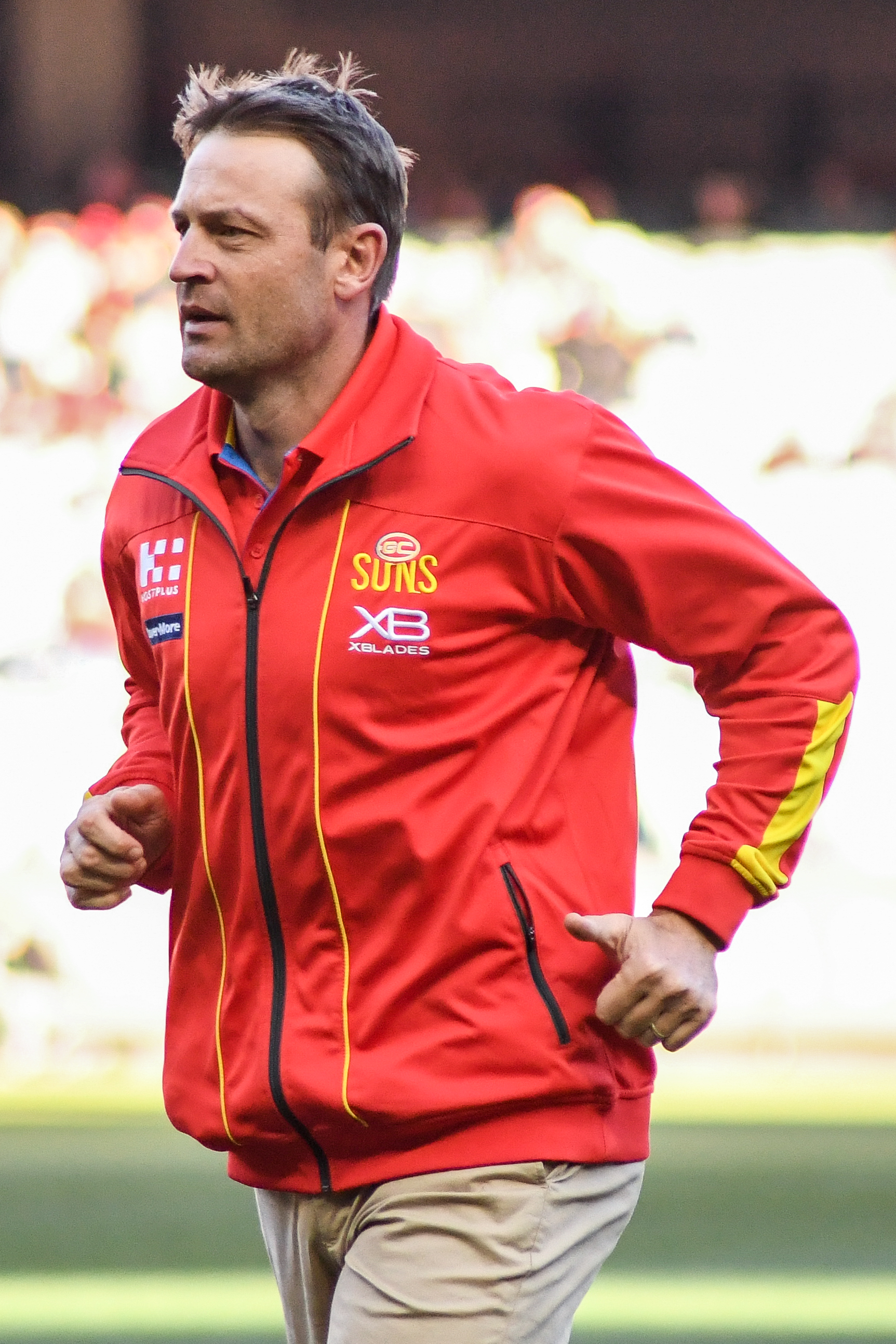
Primus with the Gold Coast Suns in August 2018

=== Port Adelaide (2006–2012) ===
Primus was an assistant coach at Port Adelaide Football Club under senior coach Mark Williams from December 2005 until July 2010.

Just over midway through the 2010 season, with the Power’s record getting worse week by week, Williams stepped down as senior coach after Round 15, and Primus was appointed the caretaker senior coach for the remainder of the 2010 season. As caretaker senior coach, Primus won five of his seven games in charge, with two of them against in-form teams Adelaide and Hawthorn, and earned numerous praises from players, staff and supporters for the job in 2011. The club administration had started the search for a new coach and it was believed that the Power would appoint someone who had never been associated with the club before. Nevertheless, Primus was appointed as the senior coach of the club for three years.

In the 2011 season in Primus' first full season as the full-time Port Adelaide senior coach, the side won only three games, finishing second-last, narrowly avoiding the wooden spoon with a win in the final round of the season against Melbourne, at the expense of Gold Coast in their inaugural season. He finished the 2011 season with a 3–19 win–loss record. In the 2012 season, he coached the team to a 5–13 record after nineteen rounds, but after the team's 34-point loss to struggling expansion team Greater Western Sydney in Round 19, Primus was sacked as senior coach of Port Adelaide after he was informed that his contract would be terminated one year early at the end of the season; he opted to step down as senior coach immediately, on 6 August 2012, rather than coach out the remaining four matches, and he was replaced by Port Adelaide assistant coach Garry Hocking as caretaker senior coach for the remainder of the 2012 season. He left Port Adelaide with a winning percentage of just 27.7%.

=== Gold Coast Suns (2013–2018) ===
On 25 September 2013, Primus was announced as an assistant coach of the Gold Coast Suns. At the end of the 2018 season, Primus left the Gold Coast Suns after he was told that his contract would not be renewed as assistant coach as part of a clean-out at the club.

=== Southport (2025–) ===
On 7 August 2024, Southport Football Club announced Primus would join the club as its Victorian Football League (VFL) senior coach, beginning from the 2025 season.

== Personal life ==
Primus married Melissa Tucker in January 2007. They have three daughters together, Skye (born April 2006), Holly (born July 2007) and Georgia (born August 2008). He is also the grandson of former Geelong Football Club player, captain and coach Reg Hickey.

== Honours and achievements ==
Team:

- Port Adelaide Pre Season Premiership 2001, 2002

Individual:

- All Australian 2001, 2002
- Port Adelaide second best and fairest 1997
- Fitzroy second best and fairest 1996
- Port Adelaide best and fairest 2002
- Port Adelaide best team man 2000, 2001
- Port Adelaide captain 2001–2005
- Port Adelaide coach 2010–2012
- International Rules Series 2002
