= Stuart Maxfield =

Australian rules footballer

Personal information
- Born: 9 April 1972 (age 54)
- Original team: Caulfield Grammar School
- Debut: 13 May 1990 Round 7, Richmond vs. Geelong, at Kardinia Park
- Height: 178 cm (5 ft 10 in)
- Weight: 82 kg (181 lb)

Playing career^{1}
Years	Club	Games (Goals)
1990–1995	Richmond	89 (65)
1996–2005	Sydney Swans	200 (87)
Total		289 (152)
- ^{1} Playing statistics correct to the end of 2005.

Career highlights
- Australian International Rules representative 2001; Sydney Swans captain 2003–2005

Stuart Maxfield (born 9 April 1972) is a retired Australian rules footballer who played for Richmond and the Sydney Swans in the Australian Football League (AFL). He was the Swans' captain until 5 May 2005, when he stood down from the position.

Maxfield was recruited in 1990 from Caulfield Grammar School by Richmond, and debuted that year. He played six seasons at Richmond, making 89 senior appearances.

In the 1996 pre-season AFL Draft, Richmond released Maxfield from his contract and he was drafted by Sydney, arriving at the club in the same year as Tony Lockett. Maxfield was a solid midfield contributor alongside Paul Kelly, and in 2003 was rewarded by being appointed captain after Kelly retired from the AFL.

In 2005, Stuart Maxfield and his wife separated, and he decided to resign from the Sydney captaincy to spend time with his children in Melbourne on weekdays. After stepping down as captain Maxfield suffered multiple injuries keeping him out of the team for the remainder of the season, and as a result missed an opportunity to play in the 2005 AFL Grand Final in which Sydney defeated the West Coast Eagles by four points. Shortly after the game, at the club's 2005 Best and Fairest awards night, he announced his retirement from the AFL.

== See also ==
- List of Caulfield Grammar School people
