= Matthew Young (Australian footballer) =

Australian rules footballer

Personal information
- Full name: Matthew Young
- Born: 17 September 1972 (age 54)
- Original team: St. Pats (Tasmania)
- Height: 183 cm (6 ft 0 in)
- Weight: 84 kg (185 lb)
- Position: Half back

Club information
- Current club: Retired
- Number: Haw. 33, StK. 20

Playing career^{1}
Years	Club	Games (Goals)
1994–95	Hawthorn	21 (6)
1996–2001	St Kilda	97 (14)
Total		118 (20)
- ^{1} Playing statistics correct to the end of 2001.

Matthew Young (born 17 September 1972) is a former Australian rules footballer who played with Hawthorn and St Kilda. After a long stint in the Hawthorn reserves, and limited opportunity in the senior side for his first two seasons, he was selected by St Kilda in the 1996 March draft. Given this new opportunity, Young had a successful 1996 season, ranking high in St Kilda's best and fairest award. He was plagued by a number of injuries during his career, including chronic back problems and a shoulder injury during the 1997 season.

Young played in 17 of 22 matches in the 1997 home and away rounds in which St Kilda qualified in first position for the 1997 AFL Finals Series, winning the club's 2nd Minor Premiership and 1st McClelland Trophy.

A back injury sustained during the preliminary final, and the doubts of St Kilda leadership about his ability to play a whole game meant he was dropped from the side for the 1997 Grand Final. 1999 was another successful season, and he was runner up in the best and fairest. During 1999, he was seen by opposition coaches as being such an important player for St. Kilda that he was often tagged despite playing on a half back flank. He struggled during 2000 however and was eventually cut from the list at the end of the following year. Often considered a strong running defender, occasional disposal errors marred his later career.

== Sources ==
- Holmesby, Russell & Main, Jim (2007). The Encyclopedia of AFL Footballers. 7th ed. Melbourne: Bas Publishing.
