= Ashley Fernee =

Australian rules footballer

Personal information
- Full name: Ashley Fernee
- Born: 24 June 1977 (age 49)
- Original team: Calder Cannons
- Height: 196 cm (6 ft 5 in)
- Weight: 84 kg (185 lb)

Playing career^{1}
Years	Club	Games (Goals)
1996	Adelaide	2 (0)
- ^{1} Playing statistics correct to the end of 1996.

Ashley Fernee (born 24 June 1977) is a former Australian rules footballer who played in the Australian Football League (AFL). He was selected for the Adelaide Football Club in the 1995 draft, having previously played with the Calder Cannons.

Fernee only played two games for the Adelaide Football Club in 1996, debuting against Fitzroy Football Club in round 17. In spite of those two games, he was not selected to play in 1997, and in 1998 things were not looking promising, with Michelangelo Rucci stating that the "wait will go on unless a long injury list strikes again". Fernee did not play in 1998, and he was delisted by the Adelaide Football Club in October of that year.

He played for the SANFL team, South Adelaide Football Club, in 1999, and nominated for the AFL draft at the end of the season. Unsuccessful, Fernee left Adelaide to return to Victoria, where he played for the East Keilor Football Club.
