= Brad Cassidy =

Australian rules footballer (born 1976)

Personal information
- Born: 25 July 1976 (age 50)
- Original team: North Ballarat Rebels
- Debut: Round 1, 30 March 1996, Fitzroy vs. Hawthorn, at Western Oval

Playing career^{1}
Years	Club	Games (Goals)
1996	Fitzroy	14 (10)
1997	Collingwood	2 (0)
Total		16 (10)
- ^{1} Playing statistics correct to the end of 1997.

Brad Cassidy (born 25 July 1976) is an Australian rules footballer.

== Fremantle career ==
Cassidy was drafted in 1994 as a pre draft selection and was delisted at the end of the 1995 season after playing no games.

== Fitzroy career ==
Cassidy was drafted in the 1995 national draft at selection 49 and his career ended at the end of the 1996 season when Fitzroy's AFL operations were taken over by the Brisbane Bears to form the Brisbane Lions, after playing 14 games.

== Collingwood career ==
Cassidy was drafted in 1996 national draft at selection 65 and was delisted at the end of the season after only playing the final 2 games of the year.

== After football ==
Cassidy moved to Warrnambool to coach before moving to Stawell and starting a painting business (Cassidy Painting). He is married to Leisa and they have three children. He now coaches (2010, 2014 - 2015) Stawell football club in the Wimmera league.
