= 1996 AFL Rising Star =

Australian rules football award

1996 Norwich AFL Rising Star
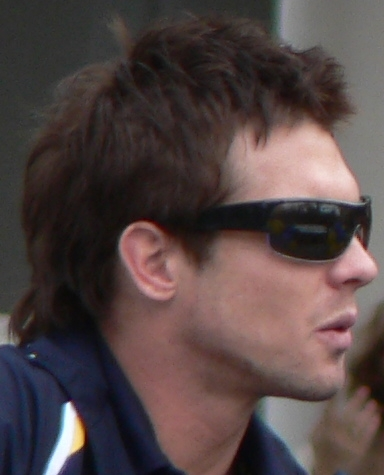
- Ben Cousins, winner of the 1996 AFL Rising Star award, during 2006
- Sponsored by: Norwich
- Country: Australia
- Rising Star: Ben Cousins (West Coast)

The Norwich AFL Rising Star award is given annually to a standout young player in the Australian Football League. The 1996 medal was won by West Coast player Ben Cousins.

== Eligibility ==
Every round, an Australian Football League rising star nomination is given to a standout young player. To be eligible for the award, a player must be under 21 on 1 January of that year, have played 10 or fewer senior games and not been suspended during the season. At the end of the year, one of the 22 nominees is the winner of award.

== Nominations ==
Round	Player	Club
1	Matthew Primus	Fitzroy
2	Daniel Bandy	Fremantle
3	Luke Darcy	Footscray
4	Greg Harding	Fremantle
5	Adam Simpson	North Melbourne
6	Shannon Grant	Sydney
7	Andrew Schauble	Collingwood
8	Nick Carter	Fitzroy
9	Jarrad Schofield	West Coast
10	Daniel Chick	Hawthorn
11	Adem Yze	Melbourne
12	Ben Cousins	West Coast
13	Craig Biddiscombe	Geelong
14	Kingsley Hunter	Fremantle
15	Steven King	Geelong
16	Chad Morrison	West Coast
17	Peter Bell	North Melbourne
18	Daniel McPherson	Sydney
19	Matthew Lloyd	Essendon
20	Luke Toia	Fremantle
21	Jeff Farmer	Melbourne
22	Craig Callaghan	Fremantle
Source: AFL Record Season Guide 2015

== Final voting ==
	Player	Club	Votes
1	Ben Cousins	West Coast	15
2	Shannon Grant	Sydney	14
further placings unknown
Source: The Age
