= Ted Cahill (Australian footballer) =

Australian rules footballer, born 1902

Personal information
- Full name: Edward Joseph Cahill
- Born: 10 September 1902; Kanowna, Western Australia
- Died: 21 July 1968 (aged 65); Footscray, Victoria
- Original team: Kingsville / Subiaco
- Height: 187 cm (6 ft 2 in)
- Weight: 89 kg (196 lb)

Playing career^{1}
Years	Club	Games (Goals)
1923–24	Subiaco}	29 (32)
1927–28	Footscray	20 (16)
- ^{1} Playing statistics correct to the end of 1928.

Edward Joseph Cahill (10 September 1902 – 21 July 1968) was an Australian rules footballer who played with Subiaco in the West Australian Football League (WAFL), Kingsville in the Victorian Junior Football Association (VJFA) and Footscray in the Victorian Football League (VFL).

After playing two seasons with Subiaco in the WAFL, in 1925 Cahill moved to Melbourne to play for Footscray. However, he instead obtained employment with a local contractor who was linked to the Kingsville club in the Junior Association, and played for them in 1925 and 1926. In mid 1927 he finally joined Footscray, going on to play 20 games for them in the next two seasons.

In April 1939 Cahill was found guilty of running a gaming house in his shop, and was fined £10.
