= Jason Cripps =

Australian rules footballer

Personal information
- Born: 14 October 1976 (age 50)
- Original teams: Ashwood; De La Salle; Central Dragons
- Debut: Round 3, 1996, St Kilda Football Club vs. Melbourne, at Princes Park
- Height: 183 cm (6 ft 0 in)
- Weight: 86 kg (190 lb)

Playing career^{1}
Years	Club	Games (Goals)
1996–2002	St Kilda	60 (10)
- ^{1} Playing statistics correct to the end of 2002.

Jason Cripps (born 14 October 1976) is a former Australian rules footballer who played with St Kilda in the Australian Football League (AFL).

== AFL career ==
Cripps was often used as a tagger but also played in defence. He played in the Saints' losing 1997 Grand Final team and in 1998 suffered a serious hamstring injury which saw the muscle torn off the bone. As a result, he did not return to football until 2001, kicking a goal with his first kick back. He was delisted at the conclusion of the 2002 season.

== Post-football career ==
Cripps played with Tasmania in the VFL for a season before returning to St Kilda in player development and assistant coaching roles under Grant Thomas.

He moved to Port Adelaide for the 2007 season as an assistant coach under Mark Williams before becoming the club's list manager at the end of 2011. In 2015 he suffered a heart attack whilst out jogging in Perth. He was in Perth with the other Power's recruiting staff to watch the NAB AFL Under-18 Championships.
