= Michael Brown (Australian rules footballer) =

Australian rules footballer, born 1976

Personal information
- Born: 20 September 1976 (age 50); Perth, Western Australia
- Original team: Swan Districts (WAFL)
- Debut: Round 4, 20 April 1996, Fremantle. vs. Collingwood., at Victoria Park

Playing career^{1}
Years	Club	Games (Goals)
1996–1998	Fremantle	22 (15)
- ^{1} Playing statistics correct to the end of 1998.

Michael Brown (born 20 September 1976) is a former professional Australian rules footballer who played as a Centre half-forward for the Fremantle Football Club in the Australian Football League (AFL).

Originally from Western Australian Football League (WAFL) club Swan Districts, Brown was drafted by Fremantle in the 1995 Pre-Season draft. He made his senior AFL debut for Fremantle in Round 4 1996, against Collingwood at Victoria Park.

Brown played 22 games before he was delisted at the end of the 1998 AFL season.
