= Sam McFarlane =

Australian rules footballer

Personal information
- Full name: Sam McFarlane
- Born: 5 December 1975 (age 50)
- Original team: Subiaco
- Draft: No. 33, 1995 National Draft
- Height: 178 cm (5 ft 10 in)
- Weight: 80 kg (176 lb)

Playing career^{1}
Years	Club	Games (Goals)
1996	North Melbourne	2 (0)
- ^{1} Playing statistics correct to the end of 1996.

Sam McFarlane (born 5 December 1975) is a former Australian rules footballer who played with North Melbourne in the Australian Football League (AFL).

McFarlane was a member of the Subiaco team that contested the 1995 West Australian Football League Grand Final, which they lost to West Perth.

A wingman, McFarlane was initially recruited by Fremantle, in the 1994 National Draft, but was delisted without playing a senior league game. He was then selected by North Melbourne with pick 33 in the 1995 National Draft. He made his debut in North Melbourne's round six win over Geelong at the Melbourne Cricket Ground in the 1996 AFL season and also played the following round, against the West Coast Eagles at Subiaco Oval. They were his only two appearances in what was a premiership year for North Melbourne.

In a reserves game against St Kilda in 1997, McFarlane was struck in the jaw by forward Barry Hall and had to spend three days in hospital, where he had his jaw wired back together and three titanium plates inserted in his face. He returned to Subiaco after being delisted by North Melbourne.
