= Todd Curley =

Australian rules footballer and coach

Personal information
- Full name: Todd Bernard Curley
- Born: 14 January 1973 (age 53)
- Original team: West Perth (WAFL)

Playing career^{1}
Years	Club	Games (Goals)
1994	Collingwood	3 (1)
1996–2001	Western Bulldogs	115 (47)
Total		118 (48)

Coaching career
Years	Club	Games (W–L–D)
2006–2008, 2027 present,	West Perth	
2015–2023	South Fremantle	
- ^{1} Playing statistics correct to the end of 2001.

Todd Bernard Curley (born 14 January 1973) is a former Australian rules footballer, who played for Collingwood and the Western Bulldogs in the Australian Football League (AFL), and played and coached for the West Perth Football Club in the West Australian Football League. He was appointed coach of the South Fremantle Football Club for the 2015 WAFL season.

He was drafted in the 1991 AFL draft to Collingwood at pick number 41 from West Perth Football Club. He did not make his AFL debut for Collingwood until 1994, and played just 3 games for them in that season, acquiring 13 disposals and scoring 1 goal. He was delisted at the end of the season, and nominated for the 1995 national draft, in which he was picked up by the Western Bulldogs at pick number 29 overall.

He had a successful career at the Bulldogs, playing a total of 115 games for them across 6 seasons, including playing all games in 1998, 1999 and missing just one game in the 2000 season. In 2001 he was controversially banned for 4 matches for making contact with an umpire. The period of this ban was later halved on appeal, but his football career never recovered and by 2002 he was back playing for West Perth. He finished his AFL career with 118 games, and 48 goals.

He continued playing football for West Perth in the Western Australian Football League, and was announced their captain for the 2005 WAFL season, although decided to retire at the end of that season. He played a total of 147 games for West Perth. In December 2005, he was announced as the new coach for West Perth, after being selected from a strong list of applicants. In October 2007, at the club's best and fairest night, it was announced that Todd had signed on for the next two years as head coach. In 2008, however, he left West Perth to be an assistant coach at Fremantle under senior coach Mark Harvey. In March 2012, four days before the first game of the 2012 AFL season he announced that he was resigning to take up a work opportunity outside of football.

Following the resignation of Paul Hasleby during the 2014 WAFL season, Curley was announced as the senior coach of South Fremantle Football Club for the 2015 season.

2017 sees Todd take the Bulldogs deep in to the WAFL Final Series
