= Jason Traianidis =

Australian rules footballer

Personal information
- Full name: Jason Traianidis
- Born: 7 November 1974 (age 51)
- Original team: Shepparton United
- Height: 188 cm (6 ft 2 in)
- Weight: 95 kg (209 lb)

Playing career^{1}
Years	Club	Games (Goals)
1996–2001	St Kilda	62 (36)
- ^{1} Playing statistics correct to the end of 2001.

Jason Traianidis (born 7 November 1974) is a former Australian rules footballer who played with St Kilda in the Australian Football League (AFL).

Originally from Shepparton, Traianidis was a member of the North Melbourne reserves 1995 premiership team. He had been on North Melbourne's supplementary list that season and was almost drafted by the club in the 1996 pre-season but they went for Peter Bell at the last minute.

Traianidis was instead signed by St Kilda and after taking part in their Ansett Cup premiership - where he kicked one of the competition's most famous goals off the ground - played 13 AFL games in 1996. A half forward, he kicked two goals on debut and was goal-less in his second game despite scoring five behinds. He suffered a back injury in 1997 which kept him on the sidelines for much of the year but got to play in St Kilda's qualifying final win over the Brisbane Lions. In 1999 he started the season brightly but missed the second half of the year as he needed a knee reconstruction. He was tried as a defender in 2000 and averaged 16 disposals a game. In the penultimate round of the 2001 season, Traianidis was reported for striking Brett Kirk and after receiving a one match ban announced his retirement.

He would return to Shepparton and continue to play country football until 2010. In his final season, playing for Shepparton East in the Picola & District Football League, he kicked eight goals in the winning grand final team.
