= Andrew Donnelly =

Australian rules footballer

Personal information
- Full name: Andrew Donnelly
- Born: 29 March 1973 (age 53)
- Original team: Subiaco
- Draft: 50th, 1992 AFL draft
- Height: 190 cm (6 ft 3 in)
- Weight: 90 kg (198 lb)

Playing career^{1}
Years	Club	Games (Goals)
1992-2001	Subiaco	84 (108)
1994	Sydney Swans	0 (0)
1996–2000	West Coast Eagles	78 (69)
Total		162 (177)
- ^{1} Playing statistics correct to the end of 2000.

Andrew Donnelly (born 29 March 1973) is a former Australian rules footballer who played with the West Coast Eagles in the Australian Football League (AFL).

Although Donnelly, a half forward, was drafted by Sydney in the 1992 AFL draft he remained at WAFL club Subiaco in 1993. He however made the move to Sydney in 1994 but only played in their reserves and returned to Subiaco in 1995. After winning Subiaco's 1995 "Best and Fairest" award, Donnelly was signed up West Coast through the pre-season draft.

Donnelly was a solid contributor to West Coast in their run to the second week of finals in 1996, playing 20 games. He had 118 marks, the second most by a West Coast player and kicked 28 goals, the third most. In just his third league game, against Melbourne, he kicked four goals and had 25 disposals to earn best on ground honours at the Brownlow Medal night. He was awarded the best first year player award for 1996 by the Eagles, beating Ben Cousins who also made his debut that year and won the 1996 AFL Rising Star award. He struggled with various injuries during the rest of his time with the Eagles and retired in 2001, after another season playing for Subiaco.

He became the chief executive officer of insurance firm Australian Reliance. The company later collapsed and Donnelly and other directors were accused of misappropriate funds and in 2021 he was found guilty of breaching his duties as a director.
