= Luke Toia =

Australian rules footballer

Personal information
- Full name: Luke Francis Toia
- Born: 23 November 1977 (age 48); Kalgoorlie, Western Australia
- Original team: Subiaco (WAFL)
- Debut: Round 7, 1996, Fremantle vs. Adelaide, at Football Park
- Position: Rover

Playing career^{1}
Years	Club	Games (Goals)
1996–2003	Fremantle	63 (33)
- ^{1} Playing statistics correct to the end of 2003.

Career highlights
- AFL Rising Star nominee: 1996

Luke Francis Toia (born 23 November 1977) is a former Australian rules footballer who played for the Fremantle Dockers between 1996 and 2003. He was drafted from Subiaco in the WAFL as a predraft selection in the 1994 AFL draft and played mainly as a rover. He last played for Claremont in the WAFL.
