= Scott Bamford =

Australian rules footballer

Personal information
- Full name: Scott Maxwell Bamford
- Born: 23 June 1974 (age 52)
- Original team: North Adelaide (SANFL)
- Debut: Round 1, 1996, Fitzroy vs. Hawthorn, at Western Oval
- Height: 178 cm (5 ft 10 in)
- Weight: 67 kg (148 lb)

Playing career^{1}
Years	Club	Games (Goals)
1993–1995	North Adelaide	37 (31)
1996	Fitzroy	22 (6)
1997–1998	Brisbane Lions	24 (17)
1999	Geelong	13 (10)
2000–2007	North Adelaide	164 (128)
Total		260 (192)
- ^{1} Playing statistics correct to the end of 2007.

Scott Maxwell Bamford (born 23 June 1974) is a retired Australian rules footballer who played for Fitzroy, Brisbane, and Geelong in the Australian Football League and for North Adelaide in the South Australian National Football League.

== Career ==
=== Fitzroy ===
Scott Bamford was drafted in the 1995 AFL draft, first round, pick number 4 overall, to the Fitzroy Lions from North Adelaide. He made his debut in the 1st round of the 1996 AFL season, gathering 20 disposals. He went on to play all 22 games in his debut season, scoring 6 goals and 13 behinds. However, his team, Fitzroy, only managed the one win throughout the whole year, and finished on a percentage of 49.47 (see 1996 AFL season), and he played in Fitzroy's last AFL game, an 86-point loss. Bamford was one of eight players to transfer to Brisbane when Fitzroy's AFL operations were taken over by the Brisbane Bears to form the Brisbane Lions, which included notable players such as Chris Johnson and John Barker.

=== Brisbane and Geelong ===
He made his debut for Brisbane in round 2 of the 1997 AFL season, but did not have the same effect, only playing 11 games for the season, gathering 99 disposals and kicking 7 goals. In 1998, he played 13 games, scoring 10 goals. At the end of the 1998 AFL season, he was traded to Geelong where he played in the 1999 AFL season, scoring 10 goals in 13 games for the cats. He was delisted at the end of the season. He finished his AFL career with a total of 59 games and 33 goals for 3 different teams.

=== North Adelaide ===
He returned to play on in the SANFL with North Adelaide, which included shades from his Fitzroy time, when North Adelaide won just 1 game in 2003, finishing on the bottom of the ladder, such as Fitzroy in the 1996 AFL season. In the 2007 season, he played his 200th game for North Adelaide in the Preliminary final win against Woodville-west Torrens, although the team eventually lost the Grand Final to Central District.

Bamford considered playing on in the 2008 SANFL season, saying "I'm still enjoying the game as much, if not more, than I ever have", but, on 27 October 2007 at the North Adelaide Best & Fairest Night, he announced his retirement from football after spending three weeks agonising about his future. When making a speech he was given a standing ovation by past and present teammates, club support staff, coaching panel and supporters. He plans to spend more time with his family.
