= Fremantle Football Club drafting and trading history =

Fremantle Football Club's drafting and trading history is often cited as a reason for their poor on-field record; the club took eight years to reach a final, and won their first final in 2006. In recent years, however, they have been successful in finding good players with late round and rookie list selections, with very few father-son, free agent or academy selections.

== Recruiting staff ==
Phil Smart was the recruiting manager at Fremantle from when they were formed in 1994 until 2008, remaining at the club until the end of 2009 as their draft manager. Smart was the Claremont Football Club colts (under 19) coach in 1994, and wasn't appointed until near the end of the 1994 WAFL season on 1 September 1994, just 2 months before the team started training. He had also never seen a game outside WA, something that would factor in the trade of future Australian Football Hall of Fame inductee Andrew McLeod to Adelaide, considered one of the worst trades the Dockers have ever made. Brad Lloyd replaced Smart as the national recruitment manager, until he resigned in 2018 to join Carlton. Mark Micallef held the job for only a single year before David Walls took over in 2020.

== 1994/95 off season ==
Fremantle's initial squad of 50 players was compiled from a mixture of uncontracted players from other AFL clubs (maximum of 12 over two years), players who had previously nominated for the AFL draft but not been selected (unlimited from the WAFL, two each from the SANFL, VFL and TFL), up to ten delisted AFL players, trades with any other AFL club, unlimited selections from their four "aligned" WAFL clubs and selections 1, 4 and then the first two selections in each round of the 1994 AFL draft.

=== The McLeod trade ===
Fremantle had flown the 18-year-old McLeod and his father to Perth for an interview, but none of the coaching or recruiting staff had actually seen him play, despite McLeod having played in a premiership for Port Adelaide Football Club in the South Australian National Football League (SANFL) a few weeks earlier.

McLeod was puzzled and insulted when Fremantle coach Gerard Neesham asked him to stand up to see how tall he was. The result of this short meeting was that he was traded to Adelaide in return for promising centre half-forward Chris Groom, who they also hadn't see play. McLeod went on to play over 300 games, whilst Groom played only seven for Fremantle before being delisted at the end of the 1995 season.

Fremantle made similar trades with Melbourne to obtain Phil Gilbert and North Melbourne to obtain Troy Polak, trading away Jeff Farmer and Glenn Freeborn respectively.

=== Uncontracted players ===
Attracting uncontracted players from other AFL clubs would prove to be very difficult, except for some West Australian players willing to move back to Perth. The AFL also awarded compensation selections to any club that lost a player to Fremantle, of a 16-year-old player, which had the effect of reducing the available talent in the following year's draft, with Fremantle the only club who would be unable to recruit these 16-year-old players.

Prior to the 1994 draft, Fremantle arranged a deal with Essendon where they would recruit three players, all originally from Western Australia, and agree not to recruit any uncontracted players from any team that finished below Essendon in 1994. This would ensure that Essendon would have the first choice of the 16-year-olds in the compensation draft. Officially Todd Ridley was recruited as the uncontracted player, with Tony Delaney and Dale Kickett being traded for later picks. Whilst Kickett had a long and distinguished career at Fremantle, becoming the first player to play 100 games for the club and winning the Doig Medal in 1997, Delaney and Ridley weren't as successful. Essendon, however, recruited Matthew Lloyd with the 16-year-old compensation selection and Scott Lucas with the 4th selection, who would each play 270 games and kick a combined total of 1397 goals.

Fremantle also recruited its inaugural captain, Ben Allan and three of their first four best and fairest award winners, Peter Mann, Stephen O'Reilly and Jason Norrish through the uncontracted player process. Only one of the uncontracted players recruited, Andrew Wills, was not originally from Western Australia. In contrast to the outstanding career of Lloyd, the careers of the other compensation selections was mixed. Whilst West Coast's Chad Morrison and Geelong's Steven King had long and successful careers, and North Melbourne's Stuart Cochrane and Geelong's Adam Houlihan each played around 100 AFL games, Hawthorn's selection of David McEwan didn't play an AFL game and Melbourne's David Cockatoo-Collins only played two games.

Traded to Fremantle

- Dale Kickett (Essendon) for selection #39
- Tony Delaney (Essendon) for selection #4
- Phil Gilbert (Melbourne) for Jeff Farmer
- Chris Groom (Adelaide) for Andrew McLeod
- Scott Watters (Sydney) for selection #21
- Troy Polak (North Melbourne) for Glenn Freeborn and selection #55
- Pick 42 for Darryl Wakelin (St Kilda)

1994 National draft:

1: Jeff White (Southern U18)
22: Winston Abraham (Perth)
42: Douglas Headland (Perth)
56: Ryan Smith (West Perth)
72: Dean Grainger (Northern U18)
73: Sam McFarlane (Subiaco)

Pre-season draft:

2: Greg Madigan (Hawthorn)

Pre-draft selections:

- Daniel Bandy (Perth)
- Jay Burton (Subiaco)
- Brad Cassidy (Ballarat Rebels)
- Antony Ljubic (Gippsland Power)
- Neil Mildenhall (West Perth)
- Peter Miller (East Perth)
- Nathan Mourish (Perth)
- David Muir (North Melbourne)
- Craig Nettelbeck (Sydney)
- Shane Parker (Subiaco)
- Luke Toia (Subiaco)

Foundation Selections

- Peter Bell (South Fremantle)
- Craig Burrows (East Fremantle)
- Matthew Burton (Subiaco)
- Craig Callaghan (Swan Districts)
- Darren Capewell (East Fremantle)
- Scott Chisholm (Claremont)
- Gary Dhurrkay (East Fremantle)
- Scott Edwards (Claremont)
- Mark Gale (Claremont)
- Scott Gooch (Subiaco)
- Anthony Jones (Claremont)
- Quenton Leach (Claremont)
- Andrew McGovern (Claremont)
- Shaun McManus (East Fremantle)
- Jamie Merillo (Claremont)
- Brendon Retzlaff (Swan Districts)
- Leigh Wardell-Johnson (Claremont)
- Brad Wira (Claremont)

Zone selections:

- Travis Edmonds (Swan Districts)
- Kingsley Hunter (Claremont)
- John Hutton (Claremont)
- Todd Menegola(Swan Districts)
- Clinton Wolf (Claremont)

Uncontracted player selections:

- Todd Ridley (Essendon): compensation selection - Matthew Lloyd
- Ben Allan (Hawthorn): compensation selection - David McEwan
- Jason Norrish (Melbourne): compensation selection - David Cockatoo-Collins
- Peter Mann (North Melbourne): compensation selection - Stuart Cochrane
- Andrew Wills (Geelong): compensation selection - Adam Houlihan
- Brendan Krummel (West Coast): compensation selection - Chad Morrison
- Stephen O'Reilly (Geelong): compensation selection - Steven King

Delisted before season started:

- Dean Grainger
- Douglas Headland
- Sam McFarlane
- Troy Polak

== 1995/96 off season ==
Traded to Fremantle

- David Hynes (West Coast) for Phillip Matera and selection #3

1995 National draft:

1: Clive Waterhouse (Port Adelaide)
7: Ben Edwards (Claremont)
13: Brad Rowe (Collingwood)
23: Jay Burton (redrafted)

Pre-draft selection:

- Daniel Parker (Subiaco)

Zone selections:

- James Clement (South Fremantle)
- Steven Koops (West Perth)
- Trent Carroll (Claremont)
- Greg Harding (Claremont)
- Gavin Mitchell (Claremont)
- Michael Brown (Swan Districts)
- Michael Clark (Swan Districts)
- Brendon Feddema (East Fremantle)
- Martin Whitelaw (West Perth)

Pre-season draft (uncontracted player selection):

- Tony Godden (West Coast): compensation selection: David Wirrpanda

Delisted

- Peter Bell
- Jay Burton (was delisted and then redrafted in the national draft)
- Darren Capewell
- Brad Cassidy
- Travis Edmonds
- Ben Edwards (was drafted and then delisted in the same off-season)
- Chris Groom
- John Hutton
- Brendan Krummel
- Antony Ljubic
- Todd Menegola
- Neil Mildenhall
- Peter Miller
- Nathan Mourish
- Craig Nettelbeck
- Brendon Retzlaff
- Ryan Smith
- Leigh Wardell-Johnson
- Clinton Wolf

Traded Away

- Brad Wira for selection #13

== 1996/97 off season ==
1996 National draft:

12: Heath Black (Oakleigh Chargers)
31: Jess Sinclair (Eastern Ranges)
46: Matthew Clucas (East Fremantle)

Rookie draft:

4: Cameron Venables (Subiaco)
19: Matthew Richter (Claremont)
34: Rupert Betheras (East Perth)
49: Scott Gooch (redrafted)
64: Gavin Milentis (Claremont)

Retired

- Scott Edwards

Delisted:

- Phil Gilbert
- Todd Ridley
- Brad Rowe
- David Muir
- Jay Burton
- Scott Gooch (was redrafted in the rookie draft)

== 1997/98 off season ==
Traded to Fremantle

- Adrian Fletcher (Brisbane Lions) with selection #26 for selection #5
- Daniel Hargraves (Western Bulldogs) for selection #18
- Stuart Anderson (Kangaroos) for Winston Abraham
- Chris Bond (Richmond) with selection #5 for selection #2

1997 National draft:

6: James Walker (North Ballarat Rebels)
21: Clem Michael (South Fremantle)
26: Brodie Holland (Tassie Mariners)
32: Troy Johnson (South Fremantle)

Rookie draft:

5: Brad Dodd (East Fremantle)
21: Paul Maher (Perth)
37: Cameron Jackson (Central U18)
53: John Neesham (East Fremantle)

Retired

- Ben Allan
- Scott Watters
- Greg Madigan

Delisted

- Craig Burrows
- David Hynes
- Jamie Merillo
- Rupert Betheras (rookie)
- Gavin Milentis (rookie)
- Matthew Richter (rookie)
- Cameron Venables (rookie)

Traded Away

- Gavin Mitchell to St Kilda for selection #32
- Jeff White to Melbourne for selection #21
- Winston Abraham to Kangaroos for Stuart Anderson

== 1998/99 off season ==
Traded to Fremantle

- Tony Modra (Adelaide) for selections #29 and #34
- Brad Wira (Western Bulldogs) for Kingsley Hunter

1998 National draft:

2: Justin Longmuir (West Perth)
18: Daniel Schell (Central District)
49: Garth Taylor (Swan Districts)
64: Andrew Shipp (Springvale)

Pre-season draft:

2: Ashley Prescott (Richmond)

Rookie draft:

2: Darren Bolton (Peel Thunder)
17: Ashley Clancy (Subiaco)
31: Antoni Grover (Subiaco)
45: Andrew Smith (Subiaco)

Rookie Elevation:

- Brad Dodd
- Paul Maher

Delisted

- Gary Dhurrkay
- Tony Godden
- Quenton Leach
- Brendon Feddema
- Cameron Jackson (rookie)
- Martin Whitelaw
- Troy Johnson
- John Neesham (rookie)

Traded Away

- Kingsley Hunter to Western Bulldogs for Brad Wira
- Scott Chisholm to Melbourne for selection #29

== 1999/2000 off season ==
Traded to Fremantle

- Troy Cook (Sydney) for selection #34
- Brendon Fewster (West Coast) for selection #16
- Troy Longmuir (Melbourne) for selections #19 and #63

1999 National draft:

2: Paul Hasleby (East Fremantle)
4: Matthew Pavlich (Woodville-West Torrens)
5: Leigh Brown (Gippsland Power)
46: Adam Butler (Murray Bushrangers)
49: Ben Cunningham (Claremont)

Pre-season draft:

2: Brad Bootsma (South Fremantle)

Rookie draft:

2: Nathan Carroll (Claremont)
18: Robbie Haddrill (Perth)
34: Luke Newick (Subiaco)
49: Dale Walkingshaw (Peel Thunder)

Rookie Elevation:

- Darren Bolton
- Antoni Grover
- Ashley Clancy

Retired

- Chris Bond (retired after he was delisted)
- Stuart Anderson
- Andrew McGovern
- Peter Mann

Delisted

- Matthew Burton
- Andrew Wills
- Daniel Parker
- Daniel Hargraves
- Tony Delaney
- Michael Brown
- Darren Bolton
- Michael Clark

Traded Away

- Stephen O'Reilly for selections #16 and #46

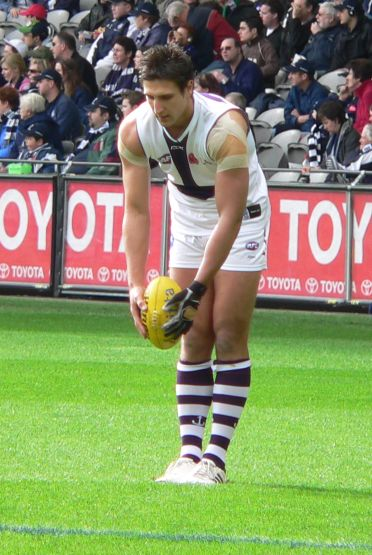
Matthew Pavlich was Fremantle's second selection in the 1999 National draft

== 2000/01 off season ==
Traded to Fremantle

- Peter Bell (North Melbourne) for Jess Sinclair and selections #6, 8 & 37
- Matthew Carr (St Kilda) for Craig Callaghan
- Daniel Metropolis (West Coast) for Greg Harding
- Dwayne Simpson (Sydney) for selection #52

2000 National draft:

39: Adam McPhee (Dandenong Stingrays)
51: Dion Woods (Perth)
66: Scott Thornton (Sandringham Dragons)

Pre-season draft:

4: Simon Eastaugh (Essendon)

Rookie draft:

5: Keren Ugle (South Fremantle)
21: Roger Hayden (South Fremantle)
36: Daniel Haines (Peel Thunder)
49: Andrew Siegert (Geelong)

Rookie elevation:

- None

Delisted

- Mark Gale
- Paul Maher
- Matthew Clucas
- Trent Carroll
- Dale Walkingshaw
- Garth Taylor
- Luke Newick
- Nathan Carroll
- Andrew Smith

Traded Away

- Craig Callaghan for Matthew Carr
- James Clement with Holland for selections #8 and #39
- Brodie Holland with Clement for selections #8 and #39
- Greg Harding for Daniel Metropolis and selection #51
- Jess Sinclair with selection #6, #8 & #37 for Peter Bell

== 2001/02 off season ==
=== The Croad trade ===
After a disastrous 2001 season during which Fremantle sacked coach Damian Drum mid-year and only won 2 games, Fremantle then became only the second club to trade away the first selection in the national draft (after Sydney Swans in 1992), which it received in addition to selection 4 as a priority draft pick due to their poor performance. In what would end up being considered one of the strongest drafts ever, Fremantle traded its first three draft selections for Hawthorn's key forward Trent Croad, along with injury prone former East Fremantle junior Luke McPharlin. Two of those selections were used by Hawthorn to draft four time premiership players and club captains Luke Hodge (#1 selection) and Sam Mitchell (#36). Fremantle had not yet appointed a coach, so the recruitment was led by the chief executive officer (CEO) Cameron Schwab, who also had only recently been hired.

Schwab is quoted as saying that it didn't matter if they traded draft pick 1 or 4, they still would have drafted Western Australian key position player Graham Polak with their first selection, ahead of the three Victorian midfielders that were chosen in the actual draft, Hodge, Luke Ball and Chris Judd. "It didn't matter whether we could take him (Polak) at No 1 or 4 — the issue was that we ranked the wrong player number one". Part of the reason for choosing three tall players in Croad, McPharlin and Polak was that they were concerned that Matthew Pavlich could leave Fremantle to return to Adelaide the following year, and they had no other key position players in their squad.

Croad would only stay at Fremantle for two years, leading Fremantle's goalkicking in 2002, before being traded back to Hawthorn at the end of the 2003 season. He then played mainly in defence for Hawthorn and was a key member of their 2008 AFL Grand Final winning team. Polak played over 100 games for Fremantle before he was traded to Richmond in 2006, whilst McPharlin played over 200 games for Fremantle and was named in the 2012 All-Australian team. Pavlich didn't return to Adelaide and remained at Fremantle later becoming the club's longest serving captain, games and goal scoring record holder, 6-time All-Australian and 6-time Doig Medalist and in 2014 became the first Western Australian based player to play over 300 AFL games.

Traded to Fremantle

- Trent Croad (Hawthorn) with McPharlin for selections #1, #20 and #36
- Luke McPharlin (Hawthorn) with Croad for selections #1, #20 and #36
- Jeff Farmer (Melbourne) for selection #17
- Troy Simmonds (Melbourne) for Daniel Bandy

2001 National draft:

4: Graham Polak (East Fremantle)
52: Andrew Browne (Claremont)
56: Paul Medhurst (Claremont)

Rookie Draft:

1: Luke Webster (East Perth)
17: Josh Head (South Fremantle)
33: Aaron Sandilands (East Fremantle)

Rookie Elevation:

- Daniel Haines
- Robbie Haddrill

Retired

- Tony Modra
- Ashley Prescott

Delisted

- Adam Butler
- Ashley Clancy
- Adrian Fletcher
- Dwayne Simpson
- Keren Ugle
- Brad Wira

Traded Away

- Daniel Bandy in a three-way trade with Troy Simmonds and Craig Ellis
- Heath Black for selection #17
- Daniel Schell for selection #56

== 2002/03 off season ==
Traded to Fremantle

- Des Headland (Brisbane Lions) for Adam McPhee, selections #3 & 19

2002 National draft:

13: Byron Schammer (West Adelaide)
48: Greg Edgcumbe (Eastern Ranges)
55: Ryan Crowley (Calder Cannons)
63: Brett Doswell (NSW/ACT Rams)

Rookie draft:

4: Ricky Mott (Sydney)
20: Ben Colreavy (Claremont)
35: Daniel Gilmore (South Fremantle)
51: Steven Dodd (East Fremantle)

Rookie elevation:

- Roger Hayden
- Andrew Siegert
- Aaron Sandilands

Retired

- Dale Kickett
- Jason Norrish
- Daniel Metropolis
- Clem Michael (retired November 2001)
- Simon Eastaugh
- Brad Bootsma

Delisted:

- Brendon Fewster
- Brad Dodd
- Andrew Shipp

Traded away:

- Leigh Brown for selection #13
- Adam McPhee for selection #55, Des Headland to Fremantle, Blake Caracella to Brisbane

== 2003/04 off season ==
2003 National draft:

10: Ryley Dunn (Murray Bushrangers)
12: Ryan Murphy (Gippsland Power)
19: David Mundy (Murray Bushrangers)
27: Adam Campbell (North Ballarat Rebels)
43: Brett Peake (East Fremantle, Father-son selection)

Rookie Draft

9: Paul Duffield (South Fremantle)
26: Dylan Smith (North Melbourne)
41: Michael Warren (Claremont)
55: Ben Colreavy (redrafted)

Pre Season Draft

8: Michael Johnson (Perth)

Rookie Elevation:

- Daniel Gilmore
- Luke Webster

Delisted

- Ben Colreavy (was redrafted in the rookie draft)
- Josh Head
- Anthony Jones
- Ricky Mott
- Luke Toia

Traded Away

- Trent Croad to Hawthorn for selection #10
- Steven Koops to Western Bulldogs for #19

== 2004/05 off season ==
Traded to Fremantle

- Josh Carr (Port Adelaide) for selections #11, #27 and # 45.
- Heath Black (St Kilda) three-way deal with Troy Simmonds and Aaron Fiora.

2004 National draft:

59: Benet Copping (Sturt)
67: Toby Stribling (North Adelaide)
69: Daniel Haines (redrafted)

Pre-season draft:

5: Jarrad Schofield (Port Adelaide)

Rookie draft:

8: Joseph Krieger (Sandringham Dragons)
24: Jack Juniper (Glenelg)
39: Ryan Crowley (redrafted)

Rookie elevation:

- Steven Dodd
- Dylan Smith

Delisted:

- Ben Colreavy
- Ryan Crowley (was redrafted in the rookie draft)
- Ben Cunningham
- Brett Doswell
- Greg Edgcumbe
- Daniel Haines (was redrafted in the national draft)
- Clive Waterhouse

Traded away:

- Troy Simmonds to Richmond, three-way deal with Heath Black and Aaron Fiora.
- Troy Longmuir to Carlton for selection #67

== 2005/06 off season ==
2005 National draft:

10: Marcus Drum (Murray Bushrangers)
26: Garrick Ibbotson (East Fremantle)
42: Robert Warnock (Sandringham Dragons)

Rookie draft:

8: Paul Duffield (redrafted)
23: Toby Stribling (redrafted)

Rookie elevated:

- Ryan Crowley
- Michael Warren

Delisted:

- Dion Woods
- Andrew Siegert
- Dylan Smith
- Toby Stribling (was redrafted in the rookie draft)
- Paul Duffield (was redrafted in the rookie draft)

Traded away:

- No trades

== 2006/07 off season ==
Traded to Fremantle

- Chris Tarrant (Collingwood) for Paul Medhurst and draft selection #8
- Dean Solomon (Essendon) plus draft selection #52 for draft selections #42 and #47

2006 National draft:

31: Clayton Collard (South Fremantle)
52: Brock O'Brien (Peel Thunder)
77: Calib Mourish (Towns Football Club, Geraldton)

Rookie draft:

13: Chris Smith (Mt Gravatt)
28: Andrew Foster (East Fremantle)
42: Darren Rumble (Subiaco)
52: Benet Copping (redrafted)

Rookie elevated:

- Paul Duffield

Retired

- Jarrad Schofield

Delisted:

- Benet Copping (was redrafted in the rookie draft)
- Daniel Haines
- Jack Juniper
- Joseph Krieger
- Toby Stribling
- Michael Warren

Traded away:

- Graham Polak plus draft selections #13 and #63 for draft selections #8 and #42 from Richmond
- Paul Medhurst plus draft selection #8 for Chris Tarrant

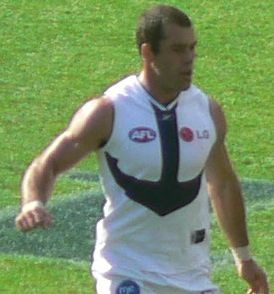
Dean Solomon was recruited by Fremantle from Essendon prior to the 2007 AFL season

== 2007/08 off season ==
Traded to Fremantle

- None

2007 National draft:

7: Rhys Palmer (East Fremantle)
24: Clayton Hinkley (North Ballarat Rebels)
40: Chris Mayne (Perth)
55: Mark Johnson (Essendon)
69: Kepler Bradley (Essendon)

Pre-season draft

6: Josh Head (South Fremantle)

Rookie draft:

6: Brent Connelly (Gippsland Power)
22: Luke Pratt (Swan Districts)
37: Calib Mourish (East Fremantle)
50: Ryley Dunn (East Fremantle)

Rookie elevated:

- Andrew Foster

Retired

- Troy Cook
- Shane Parker
- Justin Longmuir

Delisted:

- Clayton Collard
- Benet Copping
- Ryley Dunn (was redrafted in the rookie draft)
- Robbie Haddrill
- Calib Mourish (was redrafted in the rookie draft)
- Darren Rumble
- James Walker

Traded away:

- None

== 2008/09 off season ==
Traded to Fremantle

- None

2008 National draft

3: Stephen Hill (West Perth)
21: Hayden Ballantyne (Peel Thunder)
24: Nick Suban (North Ballarat Rebels)
37: Zac Clarke (Oakleigh Chargers)
53: Michael Walters (Swan Districts)
56: Ben Bucovaz (Geelong Falcons)
68: Tim Ruffles (North Ballarat Rebels)
77: Chris Hall (Woodville West Torrens)

Pre-season draft

- None

Rookie draft:

3: Casey Sibosado (Oakleigh Chargers)
19: Matt de Boer (Claremont)
34: Hamish Shepheard (East Perth)
48: Clancee Pearce (Swan Districts)
62: Jay van Berlo (West Perth)
74: Greg Broughton (Subiaco)

Rookie elevated:

- None

Retired

- Peter Bell
- Heath Black
- Matthew Carr
- Jeff Farmer
- Mark Johnson
- Shaun McManus
- Luke Webster

Delisted:

- Josh Carr
- Ryley Dunn (rookie)
- Chris Smith(rookie)
- Calib Mourish (rookie)

Traded away:

- Robert Warnock with selection 65 to Carlton for selections 24, 56 & 68

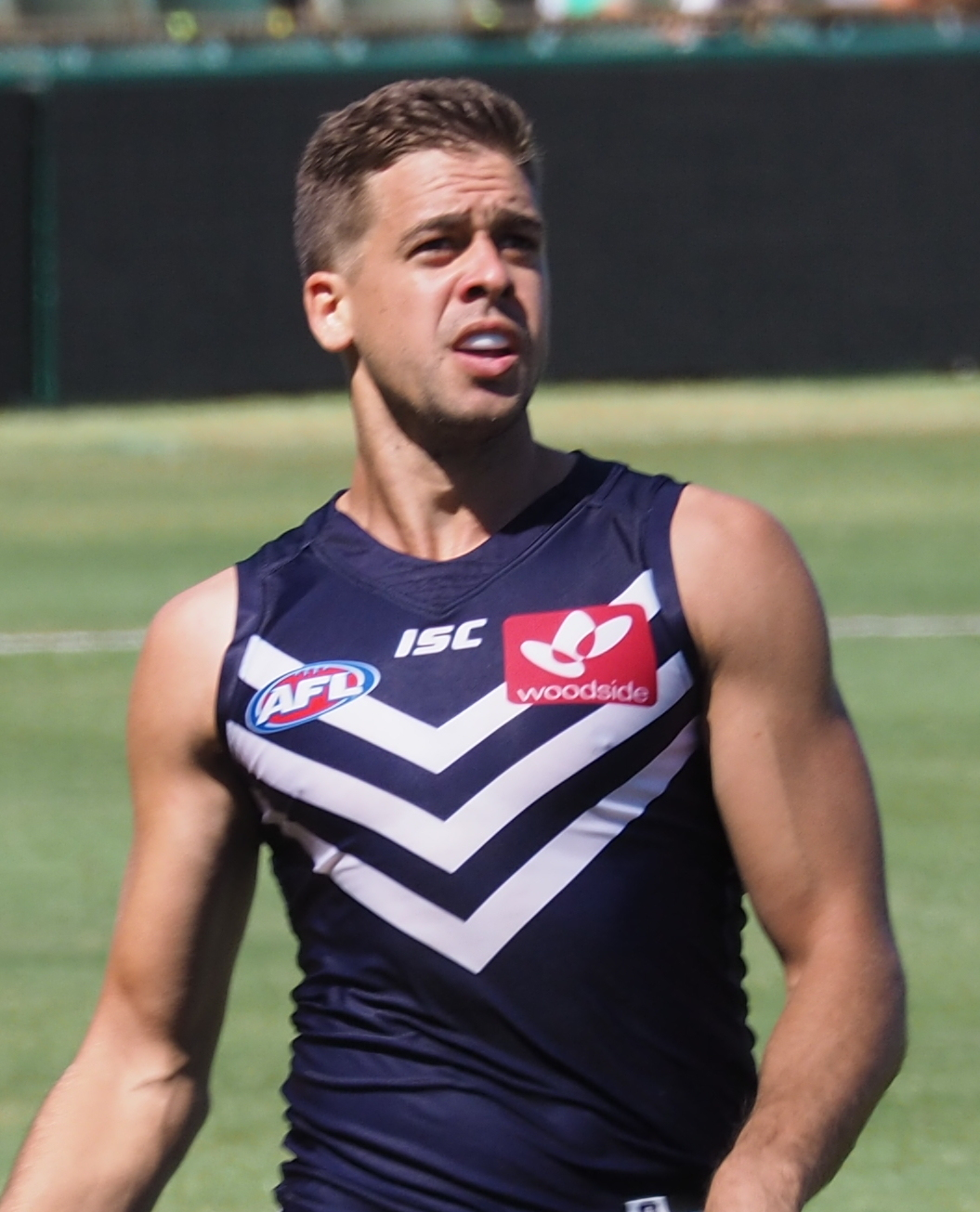
Stephen Hill was Fremantle's first selection in the 2008 National draft

== 2009/10 off season ==
Traded to Fremantle

- None

2009 National draft:

4: Anthony Morabito (Peel Thunder)
20 Nathan Fyfe (Claremont)
36: Joel Houghton (Perth)
48: Jesse Crichton (North Launceston)
49: Dylan Roberton (Dandenong Stingrays)
52: Justin Bollenhagen (South Adelaide)
68: Pass
79: Greg Broughton (rookie elevation)

Pre-season draft

3: Adam McPhee (Essendon)

Rookie draft:

8: Michael Barlow (Werribee)
24: Alex Silvagni (Casey Scorpions)

Retired

- Andrew Browne

Delisted:

- Adam Campbell
- Andrew Foster
- Daniel Gilmore
- Josh Head
- Luke Pratt (rookie)
- Brent Connelly (rookie)

Traded away:

- Brett Peake (to St Kilda) for selection 48
- Marcus Drum (to Geelong) for selection 49

== 2010/11 off season ==
Traded to Fremantle
- Peter Faulks (Williamstown) and pick #61 from Gold Coast for pick #56
- Tendai Mzungu (Perth) and pick #45 for pick #39
- Jonathon Griffin (Adelaide) for pick #61

2010 National draft

20: Jayden Pitt (Geelong Falcons)
44: Viv Michie (Oakleigh Chargers)
56: Josh Mellington (Murray Bushrangers)
72: Pass
87: Michael Barlow (rookie elevation)
100: Matt de Boer (rookie elevation)
109: Alex Silvagni (rookie elevation)
112: Jay van Berlo (rookie elevation)

Pre-season draft

6: Jack Anthony (Collingwood)

Rookie draft:

20: Gavin Roberts (Norwood)
37: Nick Lower (Norwood)
53: Ben Bucovaz (redrafted)
68: Tim Ruffles (redrafted)

Retired

- Dean Solomon
- Scott Thornton
- Paul Hasleby
- Des Headland

Delisted:

- Chris Hall
- Ben Bucovaz (was redrafted in the rookie draft)
- Tim Ruffles (was redrafted in the rookie draft)
- Brock O'Brien
- Steven Dodd
- Ryan Murphy

Traded away:

- Chris Tarrant (to Collingwood) with pick #45 for #44 and #56

== 2011/12 off season ==
Traded to Fremantle

- Pick 20 for End of Round One Compensation Pick with Greater Western Sydney Giants
- Picks 29,58 & 71 for Picks 38 & 56 with Hawthorn

2011 National draft

16: Tom Sheridan (Calder Cannons)
20: Hayden Crozier (Eastern Ranges)
29: Alex Forster (Norwood)
58: Lachie Neale (Glenelg)
71: Cameron Sutcliffe (Woodville-West Torrens)
83: Nick Lower, (rookie elevation)

Pre-season draft

- 10: Zac Dawson (St Kilda)

Rookie draft:

8: Lee Spurr (Central District)
26: Haiden Schloithe (South Fremantle)
44: Sam Menegola (Hawthorn)
61: Jordan Wilson-King (North Adelaide)
75: Clancee Pearce (redrafted)

Retired

- Byron Schammer
- Roger Hayden

Delisted:

- Clayton Hinkley
- Joel Houghton
- Ben Bucovaz
- Tim Ruffles
- Hamish Shepheard
- Justin Bollenhagen
- Clancee Pearce (was redrafted in the rookie draft)
- Casey Sibosado

Uncontracted player

- Rhys Palmer to Greater Western Sydney

Traded away:

- Nil

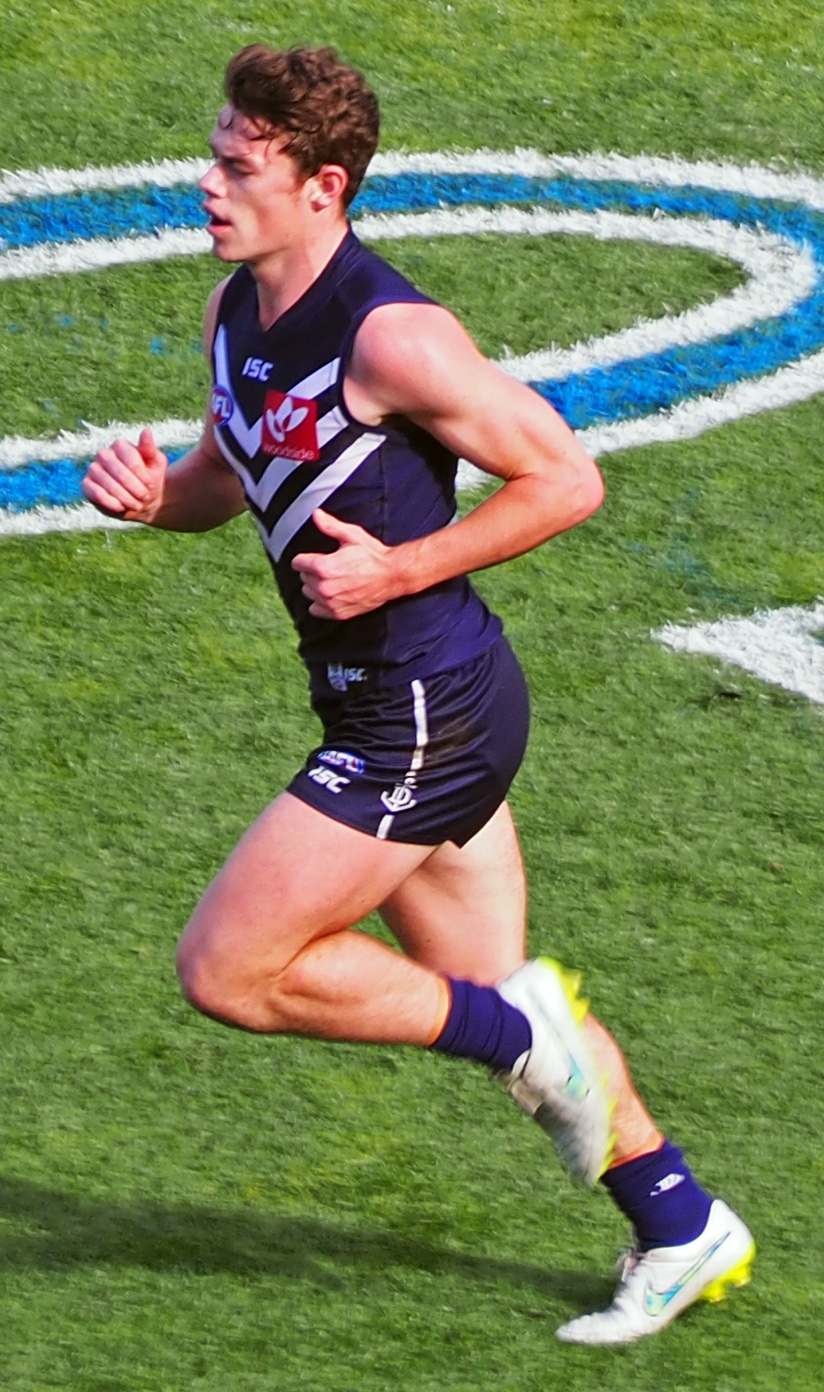
Lachie Neale played 135 games for Fremantle after being drafted in the 2011 AFL draft

== 2012/13 off season ==
Traded to Fremantle

- Pick 36 for Greg Broughton and pick 58

Free agent recruits:

- Danyle Pearce (Port Adelaide)

2012 National draft

17: Josh Simpson (East Fremantle)
36: Tanner Smith (North Ballarat Rebels)
39: Max Duffy (East Fremantle)
78: Clancee Pearce (rookie elevation)
93: Lee Spurr (rookie elevation)

Pre-season draft

8: Jack Hannath (Central District)
14: Jesse Crichton (redrafted)

Rookie draft:

11: Matt Taberner (Murray Bushrangers)
25: Alex Howson (East Fremantle)

Category B Rookie selection

46: Craig Moller (NSW AFL Scholarship)

Retired

- Antoni Grover
- Adam McPhee

Delisted:

- Jay van Berlo
- Dylan Roberton
- Nick Lower
- Jesse Crichton (redrafted)
- Jack Anthony
- Gavin Roberts
- Jordan Wilson-King

Uncontracted players/Free agents

- Nil

Traded away:

- Greg Broughton (to Gold Coast) and Pick #58

== 2013/14 off season ==
Traded to Fremantle

- Pick 58 for Viv Michie
- Scott Gumbleton (Essendon) for pick 55

Free agent recruits:

- Colin Sylvia (Melbourne)

2013 National draft

17: Michael Apeness (Eastern Ranges)
37: Alex Pearce (Ulverstone/Devonport)
58: Brady Grey (Burnie Dockers)
73: Matt Taberner (rookie elevation)

Pre-season draft

- None

Rookie draft:

16: Michael Wood (Subiaco)
32: Tom Vandeleur (South Fremantle)
47: Jacob Ballard (Northern Blues)

Retired

- Jayden Pitt

Delisted:

- Jesse Crichton
- Peter Faulks
- Alex Forster
- Alex Howson
- Josh Mellington
- Haiden Schloithe

Uncontracted players/Free agents lost

- None

Traded away:

- Viv Michie (to Melbourne)
- Pick 55

== 2014/15 off season ==
Traded to Fremantle

- None

Free agent recruits:

- None

2014 National draft

13: Lachie Weller (Southport/Broadbeach)
34: Connor Blakely (Swan Districts)
54: Ed Langdon (Sandringham Dragons)
68: Josh Deluca (Subiaco)

Rookie elevation:

- None

Pre-season draft

- None

Rookie draft:

13:Ethan Hughes (Swan Districts)
31:Tanner Smith (redrafted)
48:Sean Hurley (Kildare GAA, Ireland)

Retired

- Kepler Bradley
- Scott Gumbleton

Delisted:

- Sam Menegola
- Michael Wood
- Josh Simpson
- Tanner Smith (was redrafted in the rookie draft)

Uncontracted players/Free agents lost

- None

Traded away:

- None

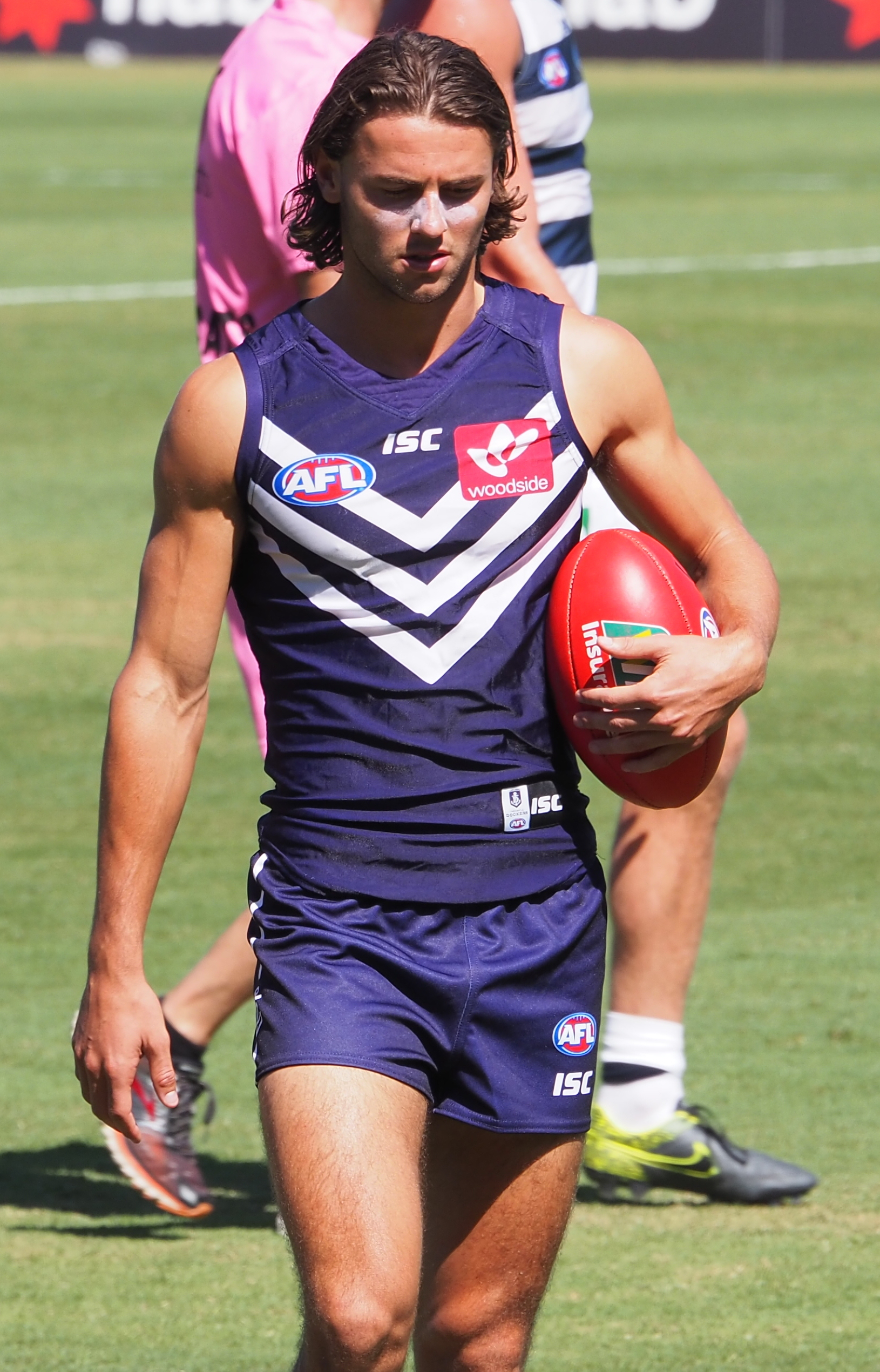
Lachie Weller was Fremantle's first selection in the 2014 National draft

== 2015/16 off season ==
Traded to Fremantle

- Harley Bennell (Gold Coast) (with #22 & #61)

Free agent recruits

- None

2015 National draft
27: Darcy Tucker (North Ballarat Rebels, TAC Cup)
38: Harley Balic (Sandringham Dragons, TAC Cup)
55: Sam Collins (Box Hill, VFL)
61: Shane Yarran (Subiaco, WAFL)
Rookie elevation

- Ethan Hughes

Pre-season draft

Rookie draft
16: Matt Uebergang (Redland, NEAFL)
34: Ryan Nyhuis (Nightcliff, NTFL)
50: Anthony Morabito (redrafted)
60: Josh Deluca (redrafted)

Retired

- Colin Sylvia
- Luke McPharlin
- Paul Duffield

Delisted

- Jacob Ballard
- Ryan Crowley
- Josh Deluca (redrafted in the rookie draft)
- Max Duffy
- Craig Moller
- Anthony Morabito (redrafted in the rookie draft)
- Tom Vandeleur

Uncontracted players/Free agents lost

- None

Traded away

- Picks #16, #56 & 2016 2nd Round

== 2016/17 off season ==
Traded to Fremantle

- Cam McCarthy (Greater Western Sydney) with picks #7, #35 & #73 for pick #3
- Bradley Hill (Hawthorn) for pick #23
- Joel Hamling (Western Bulldogs) with picks #40 & #63 for picks #35, #43 & #61
- Shane Kersten (Geelong) for pick #63

2016 National draft
8: Griffin Logue (Swan Districts)
38: Sean Darcy (Geelong Falcons)
41: Brennan Cox (Woodville-West Torrens)
66: Luke Ryan (Coburg)

Rookie draft
3: Taylin Duman (Oakleigh Chargers)
21: Luke Strnadica (East Fremantle)
38: Brady Grey (Redrafted)
50: Josh Deluca (Redrafted)

Retired

- Matthew Pavlich

Delisted

- Sean Hurley
- Tanner Smith
- Anthony Morabito
- Matt de Boer
- Jack Hannath
- Clancee Pearce
- Tendai Mzungu
- Brady Grey (redrafted in the rookie draft)
- Josh Deluca (redrafted in the rookie draft)
- Michael Barlow
- Alex Silvagni

Uncontracted players/Free agents lost

- Chris Mayne (to Collingwood), compensation: pick #23

Traded away

- Pick #3 for McCarthy, picks #7, #35 & #73

Pick swap

- Sent pick #73 and a 2017 second-round pick to Gold Coast, received picks #35, #71 and a 2017 fourth-round selection

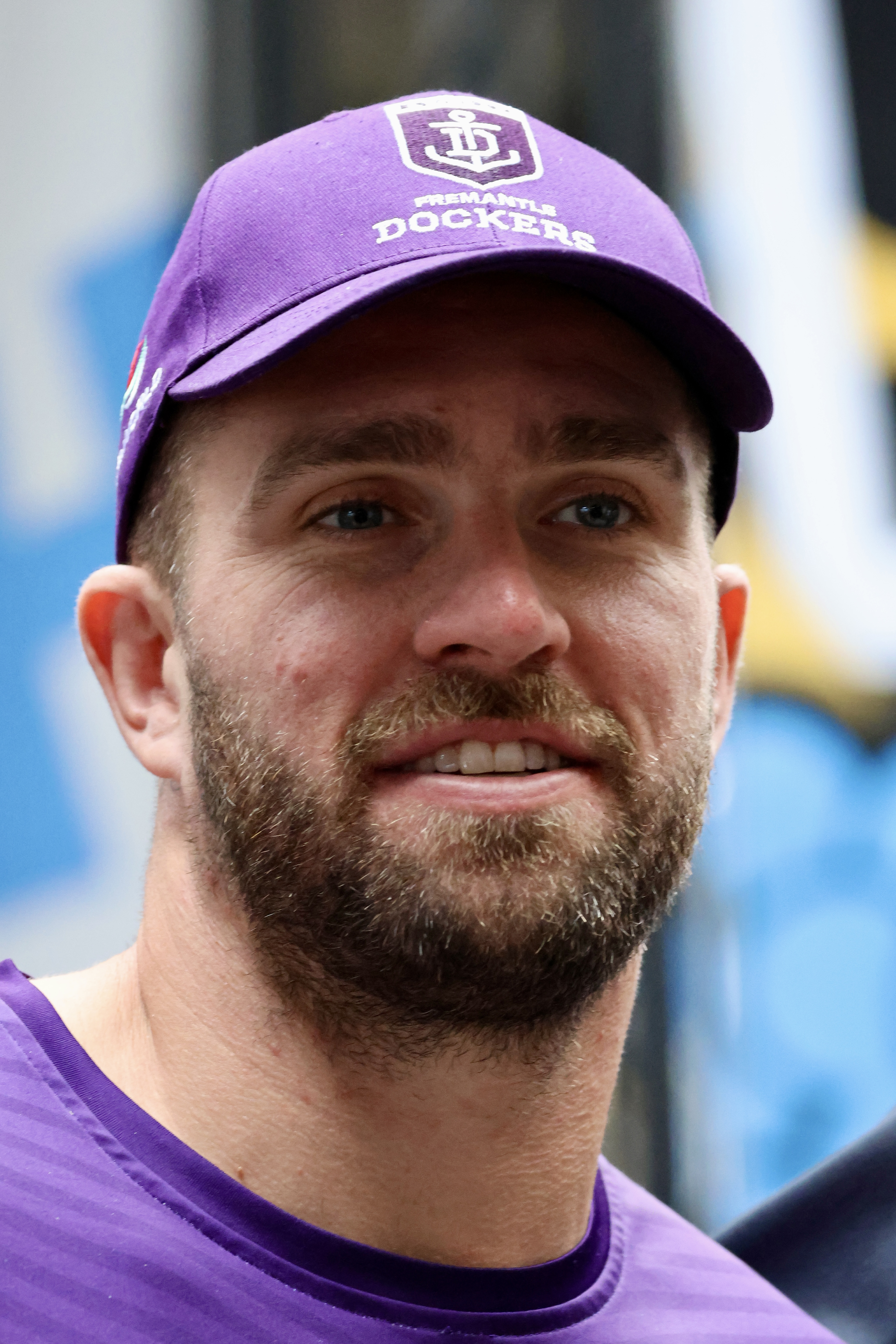
Luke Ryan would play over 200 games for Fremantle

== 2017/18 off season ==
Traded to Fremantle

- Nathan Wilson (Greater Western Sydney) and pick #71 for picks #57 and 2018 2nd round
- Brandon Matera (Gold Coast) for 2018 3rd round pick

2017 National draft
2: Andrew Brayshaw (Sandringham Dragons)
5: Adam Cerra (Eastern Ranges)
44: Hugh Dixon (Kingborough Tigers)
59: Mitch Crowden (Sturt)
65: Tom North (Eastern Ranges)
69: Lloyd Meek (Greater Western Victoria Rebels)
73: Sam Switkowski (Box Hill Hawks)
75: Scott Jones (East Perth)

Rookie elevation

- Brady Grey

Rookie draft
5: Bailey Banfield (Claremont)
21: Stefan Giro (Norwood)

Delisted

- Zac Clarke
- Sam Collins
- Josh Deluca
- Jonathon Griffin
- Matt Uebergang
- Nick Suban

Retired

- Shane Yarran
- Garrick Ibbotson
- Zac Dawson

Traded away

- Lachie Weller (to Gold Coast) with pick #41, for pick #2
- Hayden Crozier (to Western Bulldogs) with 2018 4th round pick, for picks #40 and #82
- Harley Balic (to Melbourne) for pick #66

== 2018/19 off season ==
Free agent recruits

- Reece Conca (Richmond)

Traded to Fremantle

- Jesse Hogan (Melbourne)
- Rory Lobb (Greater Western Sydney)
- Travis Colyer (Essendon)

2018 National draft
17: Sam Sturt (Dandenong Stingrays, TAC Cup)
32: Luke Valente (Norwood, SANFL)
57: Lachie Schultz (Williamstown, VFL)
59: Brett Bewley (Williamstown, VFL)

Rookie elevation

- Taylin Duman
- Bailey Banfield

Rookie draft
5: Ethan Hughes (redrafted)
22: Tobe Watson (Swan Districts, WAFL)
37: Ryan Nyhuis (redrafted)
Category B rookie nomination

- Jason Carter (Next Generation Academy, Kimberley)

Delisted

- Cameron Sutcliffe
- Tom Sheridan
- Brady Grey
- Luke Strnadica
- Ethan Hughes (redrafted)
- Ryan Nyhuis (redrafted)

Retired

- Danyle Pearce
- Michael Johnson
- Lee Spurr
- Michael Apeness

Traded away

- Lachie Neale (to Brisbane Lions)

== 2019/20 off season ==
Traded to Fremantle

- Blake Acres (St Kilda)
- James Aish (Collingwood)

2019 National draft
7: Hayden Young (Dandenong Stingrays, NAB League)
8: Caleb Serong (Gippsland Power, NAB League)
9: Liam Henry (Next Generation Academy, Derby, Claremont, WAFL)
61: Michael Frederick (Woodville-West Torrens, SANFL)

Rookie elevation

- Stefan Giro

Rookie draft
6:Jarvis Pina (Peel Thunder, WAFL)
20:Tom North (redrafted)
30:Hugh Dixon (redrafted)
Category B rookie nomination

- Isaiah Butters (Next Generation Academy, Halls Creek, Claremont, WAFL)
- Leno Thomas (Next Generation Academy, Warmun, Claremont, WAFL)

Delisted

- Harley Bennell
- Scott Jones
- Shane Kersten
- Ryan Nyhuis
- Tom North (redrafted)
- Hugh Dixon (redrafted)

Retired

- Hayden Ballantyne
- Aaron Sandilands

Traded away

- Bradley Hill (to St Kilda)
- Ed Langdon (to Melbourne)

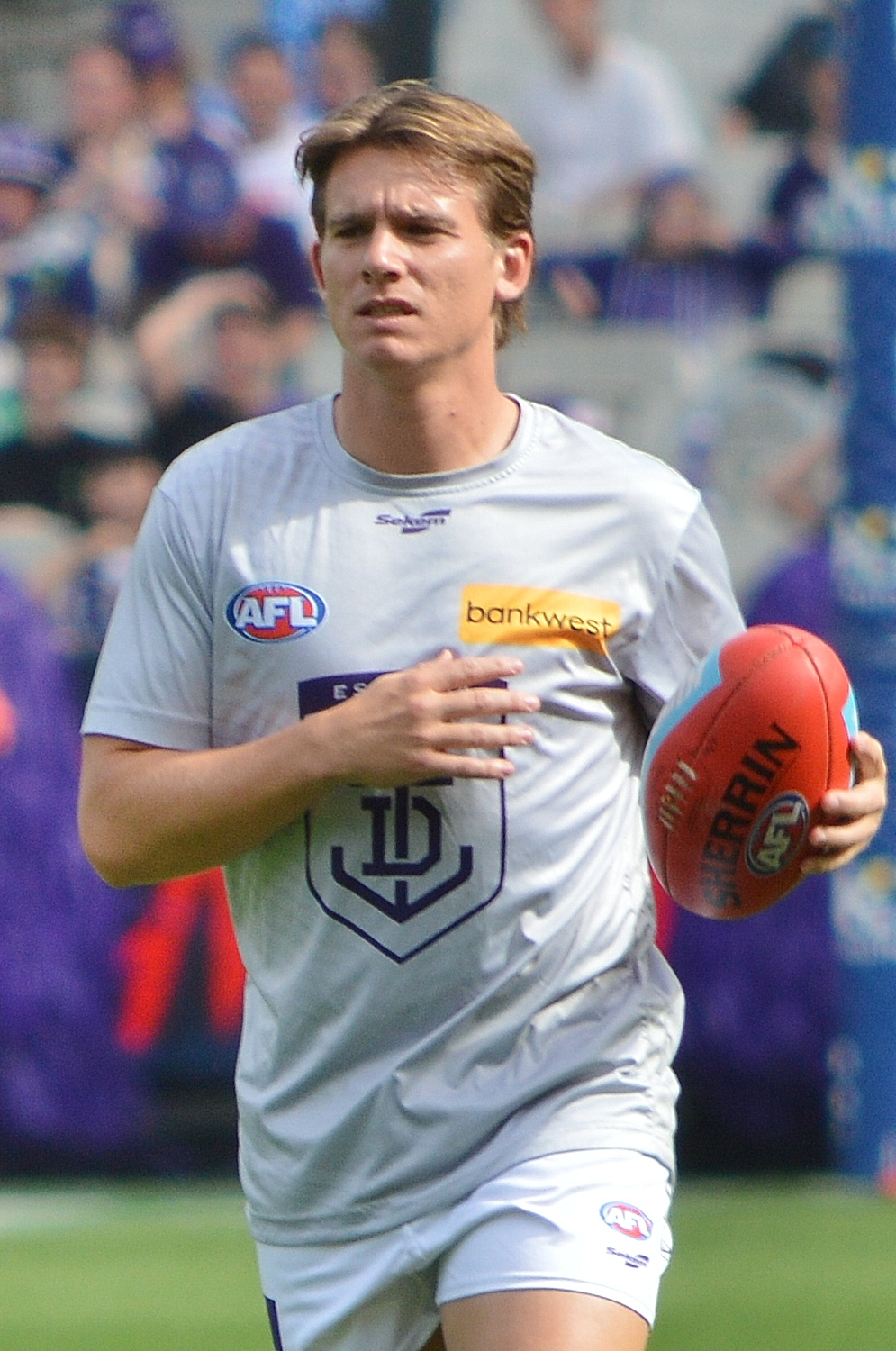
Caleb Serong won the 2020 AFL Rising Star award

== 2020/21 off season ==
Traded to Fremantle

- None

2020 National draft

- 14: Heath Chapman (West Perth)
- 27: Nathan O'Driscoll (Perth)
- 50: Brandon Walker (East Fremantle)
- 54: Joel Western (Claremont)

Rookie elevation

- None

Moved to rookie list

- Lachie Schultz
- Brett Bewley

Rookie draft

- 7: Josh Treacy (Bendigo Pioneers)
- 18: Bailey Banfield (redrafted)

Category B rookie nomination

- None

Delisted

- Brandon Matera
- Cam McCarthy
- Hugh Dixon (rookie)
- Tom North (rookie)
- Dillon O'Reilly (rookie)
- Jarvis Pina (rookie)
- Isaiah Butters (category B rookie)
- Jason Carter (category B rookie)
- Bailey Banfield (to be redrafted)

Retired

- None

Traded away

- Jesse Hogan (to Greater Western Sydney)

== 2021/22 off season ==
Traded to Fremantle

- Will Brodie (Gold Coast)
- Jordan Clark (Geelong)

2021 National draft

- 8: Jye Amiss (East Perth)
- 10: Neil Erasmus (Subiaco)
- 21: Matthew Johnson (Subiaco)
- 54: Roy Benning (Claremont)

Rookie elevation

- Ethan Hughes

Rookie draft

- 8: Karl Worner (Oakleigh Chargers)
- 25: Mitch Crowden (redrafted)
- 34: Connor Blakely (redrafted)

Mid-season rookie draft

- 15: Sebit Kuek (East Perth)

Category B rookie nomination

- Ultan Kelm (Ireland, deferred due to injury)

Delisted

- Leno Thomas (category B rookie)
- Reece Conca
- Brett Bewley (rookie)
- Taylin Duman
- Stefan Giro
- Tobe Watson (rookie)
- Connor Blakely (to be redrafted)
- Mitch Crowden (to be redrafted)

Retired

- Stephen Hill
- Luke Valente

Traded away

- Adam Cerra

== 2022/23 off season ==
Traded to Fremantle

- Josh Corbett (Gold Coast)
- Luke Jackson (Melbourne)
- Jaeger O'Meara (Hawthorn)

2022 National draft

- 33: Hugh Davies (Claremont)
- 41: Tom Emmett (Sturt)
- 42: Max Knobel (Gippsland Power)
- 57: Corey Wagner (Port Melbourne)

Rookie elevation

- Lachie Schultz

Rookie draft

- 13: Liam Reidy (Frankston)

Category B rookie nomination

- Josh Draper (Peel Thunder), Next Generation Academy selection (Indigenous)
- Conrad Williams (Claremont), Next Generation Academy selection (Indigenous)

Mid-season rookie draft

- 8: Ethan Stanley (Box Hill)

Delisted

- Connor Blakely
- Joel Western
- Mitch Crowden

Retired

- David Mundy

Traded away

- Blake Acres (Carlton)
- Griffin Logue (North Melbourne)
- Darcy Tucker (North Melbourne)
- Rory Lobb (Western Bulldogs)
- Lloyd Meek (Hawthorn)

== 2023/24 off season ==
Traded to Fremantle

- None

Free agent recruits

- Oscar McDonald (Williamstown)

2023 National draft

- 35: Cooper Simpson (Dandenong Stingrays)
- 41: Ollie Murphy (Sandringham Dragons)
- 60: Jack Delean (South Adelaide)

Rookie elevation

- Bailey Banfield
- Josh Treacy

Rookie draft

- 5: Odin Jones (West Perth)

Pre-season supplemental selection period

- Jeremy Sharp (Gold Coast)
- Patrick Voss (Essendon)

Mid-season rookie draft

- None

Delisted

- Travis Colyer
- Nathan Wilson
- Roy Benning

Retired

- None

Traded away

- Lachie Schultz (Collingwood)
- Liam Henry (St Kilda)

Free agent departures

- Joel Hamling (Sydney)

== 2024/25 off season ==
Traded to Fremantle

- Shai Bolton (Richmond)

2024 National draft

- 17: Murphy Reid (Sandringham Dragons)
- 34: Charlie Nicholls (Central District)
- 63: Jaren Carr (South Fremantle)

Rookie elevation

- Karl Worner

Rookie draft

- 7: Aiden Riddle (Claremont)

Pre-season supplemental selection period

- Quinton Narkle (Port Adelaide)
- Isaiah Dudley (Central District)

Mid-season rookie draft

- None

Delisted

- Matt Taberner
- Ethan Hughes
- Sebit Kuek
- Conrad Williams
- Ethan Stanley
- Tom Emmett
- Max Knobel

Retired

- Josh Corbett

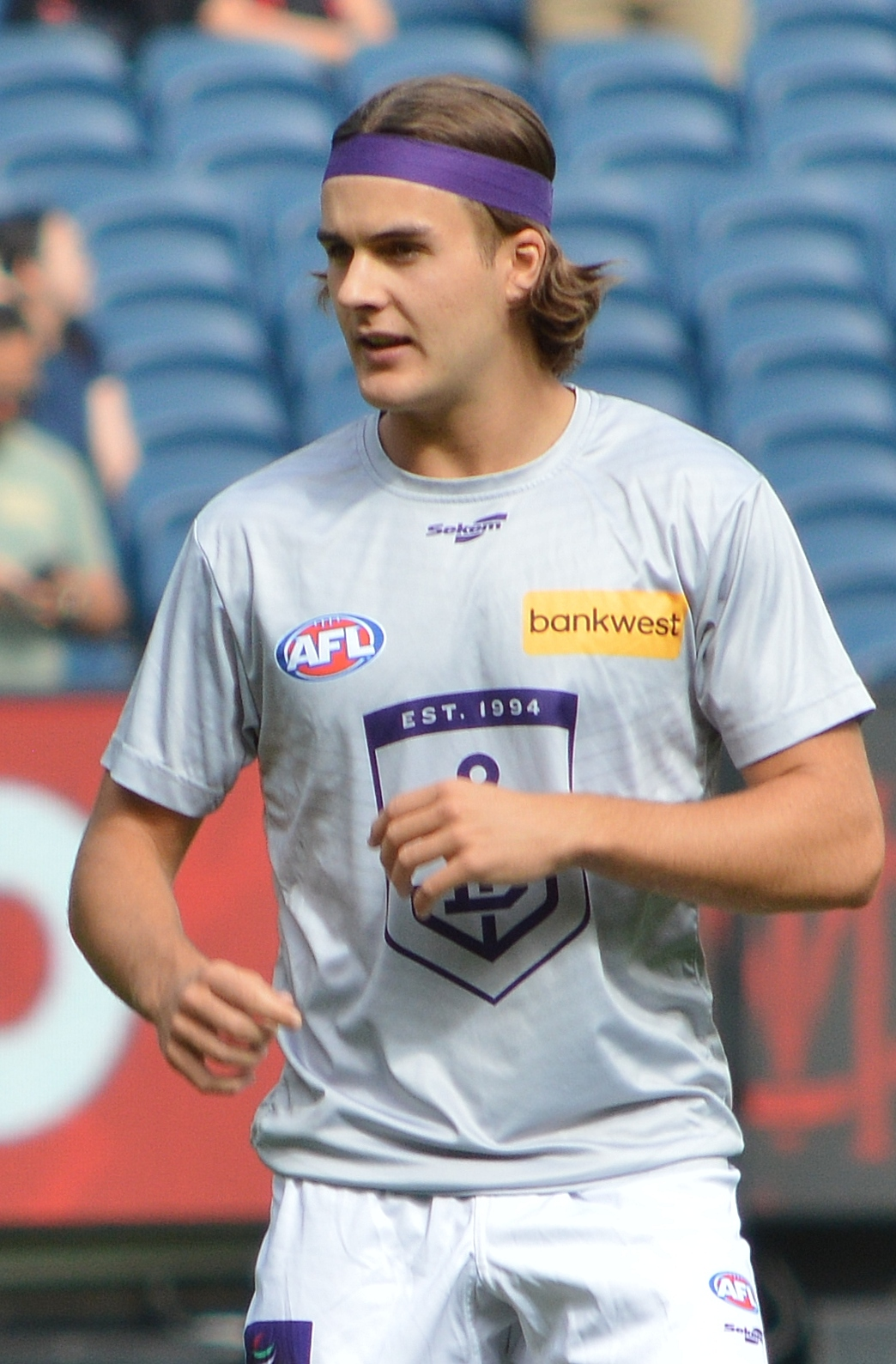
Murphy Reid, Fremantle's first selection at the 2024 National draft, in his trademark purple headband

== 2025/26 off season ==
Traded to Fremantle

- Judd McVee (Melbourne)

Free agent recruits

- None

2025 National draft

- 25: Adam Sweid (Calder Cannons)
- 40: Tobyn Murray (Geelong)

Rookie elevation

- Jeremy Sharp
- Josh Draper

Rookie draft

- 8: Leon Kickett (Swan Districts)

Category B rookie nomination

- Toby Whan (South Fremantle)
- Ryda Luke (South Fremantle)

Pre-season supplemental selection period

- Mason Cox (Collingwood)
- Chris Scerri (Northern Bullants)

Delisted

- Jack Delean
- Odin Jones

Retired

- Michael Walters
- Nat Fyfe
- Quinton Narkle
- James Aish

Traded away

- Liam Reidy (Carlton)
- Will Brodie (Port Adelaide)

Free agent departures

- None

== 2026/27 off season ==
Traded to Fremantle

- None

Free agent recruits

- Dominic Bedendo (DFA)

2026 National draft

- 18: George Dimer (Sandringham Dragons)
- 42: Kane Johnston (Perth)
- 57: Jake Medved (Sydney Swans Academy)

Rookie elevation

- Isaiah Dudley
- Patrick Voss

Rookie draft

Category B rookie nomination

Pre-season supplemental selection period

Delisted

- Bailey Banfield
- Ryda Luke
- Ollie Murphy
- Sam Sturt
- Jaren Carr

Retired

- Sam Switkowski

Traded away

- Nathan O'Driscoll

Free agent departures

- None

== See also ==
- List of Fremantle Football Club players
