= Brad Rowe =

Brad Rowe may refer to:

- Brad Rowe (actor) (born 1970), American actor
- Brad Rowe (footballer) (born 1969), Australian football player
- Brad Rowe (tennis), former tennis player from the United States
