= Peter Metropolis =

Australian rules footballer and administrator

Personal information
- Full name: Peter James Metropolis
- Nickname: "Zorba"
- Born: 29 June 1944 (age 82); Perth, Western Australia
- Original team: Wembley JFC
- Positions: Centre, wing

Playing career^{1}
Years	Club	Games (Goals)
1965–73	Subiaco	159 (136)

Representative team honours
Years	Team	Games (Goals)
1970	WAFL	1 (0)
- ^{1} Playing statistics correct to the end of 1973.

Career highlights
- Subiaco captain 1971–72; Subiaco premiership side 1973; Subiaco life member 1973

Peter James Metropolis (born 29 June 1944) is a former Australian rules football player and administrator. He played 159 games for the Subiaco Football Club in the West Australian Football League (WAFL), including the 1973 premiership, and later served as president of the club.

== Biography ==
Born in Perth, Western Australia, Metropolis began his football career at Wembley JFC. He attended Scotch College in Swanbourne, playing in the school's football First XVIII. He then went to the University of Western Australia where he played for the university's football team, winning the colts best and fairest and the senior best and fairest in consecutive seasons, playing mainly as a wingman. Falling into Subiaco's recruitment zone, he made his debut in 1965, and was switched to the centre the next season. Metropolis finished equal with Ross Gosden in the Outridge Medal, Subiaco's best and fairest, but Gosden was awarded the medal on countback.

Metropolis was selected in WAFL representative sides three times, but was only able to play once – against Tasmania in 1970 – missing out due to a hamstring injury the other times. He served as captain of Subiaco in 1971 and 1972. He stood down in 1973 after Ross Smith was recruited as captain-coach, but still served on the selection committee as one of the most senior players. Metropolis played as a reserve in Subiaco's 1973 premiership victory over West Perth. He announced his retirement from the club after the game, and was awarded life membership. He was appointed playing coach of Victoria Park in the Sunday Football League (SFL) in 1974. He returned to Subiaco with a part-time role as assistant coach in 1975 under David Parkin, but continued playing for Victoria Park until a knee injury forced his retirement in 1976.

After his retirement from playing, Metropolis returned to his former junior club, Wembley, as coach, serving in that role for two seasons in which the club finished runner-up and won a premiership. He was appointed reserves coach at Subiaco in 1979, and also served as a runner and selector for the club. After senior coach Peter Burton was sacked midway through the first week of the 1980 season, Metropolis took over for one game, against Perth, which the Lions lost. He was replaced by Ken Armstrong for the rest of the season. In 1991, Metropolis was elected to the committee of Subiaco. He was elected President of the club in 1997, a role in which he served until 2004, presiding over the club's move from Subiaco Oval to Leederville Oval. He currently serves as a vice-patron of the club, and works as a civil engineering consultant.

== Family ==
Metropolis had two children with his wife Tina: Dayna, who played netball for Western Australia, and Daniel, who played 114 games for the West Coast Eagles and Fremantle in the Australian Football League (AFL).
