= Antoni Grover =

Australian rules footballer, born 1980

Personal information
- Full name: Antoni Grover
- Born: 11 March 1980 (age 46)
- Original team: South Fremantle (WAFL)
- Draft: No 32, 1999 rookie draft, Fremantle
- Height: 189 cm (6 ft 2 in)
- Weight: 98 kg (216 lb)
- Position: Defender

Playing career^{1}
Years	Club	Games (Goals)
1999	South Fremantle	17 (2)
1999–2012	Fremantle	202 (27)
2000–2013	Subiaco	35 (13)
Total		254 (42)

Representative team honours
Years	Team	Games (Goals)
2005–2007	Indigenous All-Stars	2
- ^{1} Playing statistics correct to the end of 2012.

Career highlights
- Fremantle Life Member: 2009; Fremantle 25 since ‘95 Team

Antoni Grover (born 11 March 1980) is an Australian rules footballer who played as a defender for the Fremantle Football Club. After being elevated from the rookie list in 1999, he made his debut in round 21 against the Sydney Swans. After this he became an important and consistent performer in his defence, and also had good marking abilities (finishing fifth in the team for general and contested marks in 2005).

In round 4, 2003, Antoni Grover was one of seven indigenous players to represent Fremantle, the most ever to play in a single AFL team. The other indigenous players playing for Fremantle that day were Troy Cook, Jeff Farmer, Des Headland, Roger Hayden, Steven Koops and Dion Woods. This game also saw Fremantle kick its then-highest ever score of 25.17 167.

Grover signed a one-year extension to his contract in October 2010 that allowed him to become one of the few Fremantle players to play 200 games for the club. In 2011 he was the only Fremantle player classified as a veteran on their playing list. Grover played his 200th game against North Melbourne in round 22 2011, becoming the fifth Docker and first indigenous player to play 200 games for the club.

Grover announced his retirement in 2012, having played 202 games for the Fremantle Football Club.
