= Brendon Retzlaff =

Australian rules footballer (born 1969)

Personal information
- Born: 22 April 1969 (age 57)
- Original team: Swan Districts (WAFL)
- Debut: Round 3, 1992, Brisbane Bears vs. Fitzroy, at Carrara Stadium

Playing career^{1}
Years	Club	Games (Goals)
1992	Brisbane Bears	15 (2)
1993	West Coast	3 (0)
1995	Fremantle	6 (2)
Total		24 (4)
- ^{1} Playing statistics correct to the end of 1995.

Career highlights
- WA State Representative: 1990, 91, 93, 94; Simpson Medal: 1991

Brendon Retzlaff (born 22 April 1969) is a former Australian rules footballer who played for the Brisbane Bears, West Coast Eagles and Fremantle Dockers in the Australian Football League between 1992 and 1995.

After making his senior football debut for Swan Districts in the WAFL in 1989, he was drafted by Collingwood with selection 52 in the 1990 AFL draft but did not play a league game for them. At the end of the 1991 season he was traded to Brisbane as part of a series of trades involving Colin Alexander, Brad Rowe and Brad Hardie. He played fifteen games for the Bears, but was delisted at the end of the year. The West Coast Eagles selected him with their first selection, number 19 overall, in the 1993 Pre-Season Draft. He would only play 3 games for them before again being delisted.

He spent the 1994 season playing for Swan Districts, before being named as a foundation selection with the new Fremantle Football Club. He played six games for Fremantle before being delisted at the end of the season. He continued to play for the Swans in the WAFL, being named as their captain in 1997, his final year of league football. He represented Western Australia four times, winning the Simpson Medal in 1991 for being the best player for Western Australia.
