= Brian Gilmore =

Australian rules footballer

Personal information
- Full name: Brian Phillip Gilmore
- Born: 8 July 1933; Footscray, Victoria
- Died: 29 November 1959 (aged 26); Wangaratta, Victoria
- Original team: Yarraville
- Height: 193 cm (6 ft 4 in)
- Weight: 83 kg (183 lb)

Playing career^{1}
Years	Club	Games (Goals)
1952–1958	Footscray	105 (61)
- ^{1} Playing statistics correct to the end of 1958.

Career highlights
- VFL premiership player: 1954

Brian Phillip Gilmore (8 July 1933 – 29 November 1959) was an Australian rules footballer who played with Footscray in the Victorian Football League (VFL) during the 1950s.

Gilmore was a follower in Footscray's 1954 premiership side and had the honour of having the ball in his hands when the siren sounded. He also represented Victoria at interstate football.

He was killed in a car accident near Wangaratta, Victoria in 1959.

His grandson Daniel Gilmore played in the AFL for Fremantle.
