= Dylan Smith (Australian rules footballer) =

Australian rules footballer (born 1982)

Personal information
- Born: 18 July 1982 (age 44)
- Original team: Sandringham Dragons (TAC Cup)
- Debut: Round 1, 2001, Kangaroos vs. Essendon, at the MCG

Playing career^{1}
Years	Club	Games (Goals)
2001–2003	Kangaroos	11 (1)
2004–2005	Fremantle	10 (3)
Total		21 (4)
- ^{1} Playing statistics correct to the end of 2005.

Dylan Smith (born 18 July 1982) is a former Australian rules footballer who played for the Kangaroos and Fremantle in the Australian Football League (AFL). He grew up in Woodend, approximately 60 km north of Melbourne, and played junior football for the Woodend Junior Football Club and the Hampton Rovers Football Club. He left Woodend to take up a scholarship at Haileybury College. In 1999, he was captain of the Sandringham Dragons who also won the premiership. He was awarded the medal for the best player on the ground in the grand final. He was originally drafted by the Kangaroos from Sandringham in the TAC Cup with selection 6 in the 2000 AFL draft but only played 11 league games for them in three years. At the end of the 2003 season he was delisted and Fremantle rookie listed him with the 26th selection in the 2004 AFL draft. He played ten games for Fremantle in the next two years after being elevated to the senior list when Ryley Dunn fractured his collarbone midway through the 2004 season.

When not playing for Fremantle, Smith represented Peel Thunder in the West Australian Football League, finishing second in their best and fairest award in 2004 and 2005.
