= Robert Warnock =

Australian rules footballer

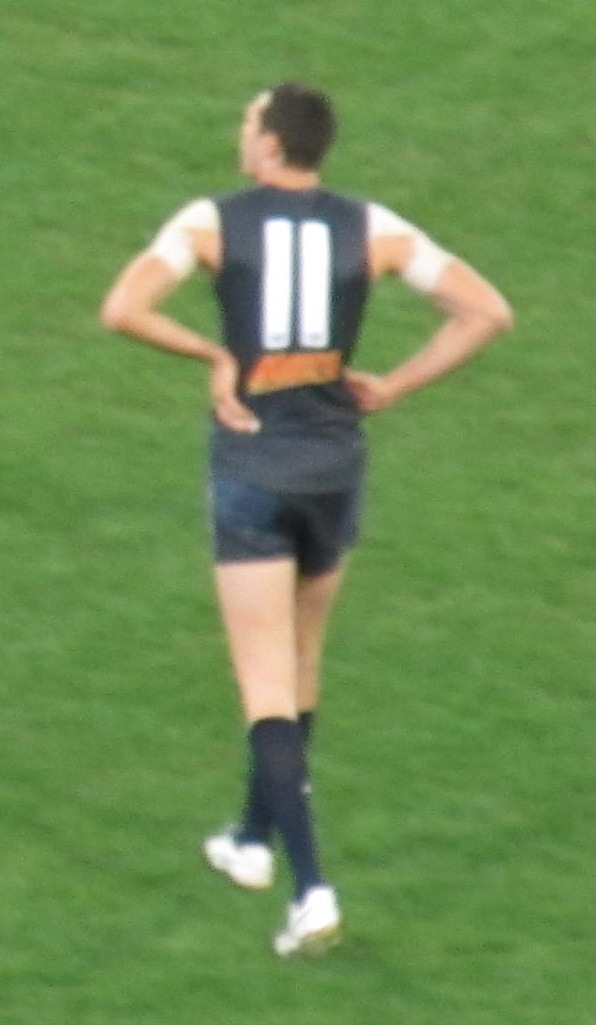

Personal information
- Full name: Robert Warnock
- Born: 19 January 1987 (age 39); Black Rock
- Original team: Sandringham Dragons (TAC Cup)
- Draft: No. 42, 2005 National Draft; Fremantle
- Height: 206 cm (6 ft 9 in)
- Weight: 103 kg (227 lb)
- Position: Ruckman

Playing career^{1}
Years	Club	Games (Goals)
2007–2008	Fremantle	21 (4)
2010–2015	Carlton	67 (13)
Total		88 (17)
- ^{1} Playing statistics correct to the end of 2015.

Robert Warnock (born 19 January 1987) is a former professional Australian rules footballer who played for the Fremantle Football Club and Carlton Football Club in the Australian Football League (AFL). Warnock is the brother of AFL footballer Matthew Warnock, who played for Melbourne and Gold Coast.

A very tall tap ruckman, at a height of 206 cm, Warnock played TAC Cup football for the Sandringham Dragons. He was recruited to the AFL by Fremantle with the pick #42 in the 2005 AFL draft. Warnock slipped to 42 in the draft due to his very light frame (80 kg). Warnock played the entire 2006 season with his assigned WAFL club, West Perth. He made his AFL debut for Fremantle in round 6, 2007 against the Brisbane Lions.

He was awarded the Beacon Award for 'the best new talent' at the 2007 Doig Medal awards night.

Warnock had wrist surgery before the start of the 2008 season which delayed his start to the year. He played only two of the first ten games as Fremantle preferred to select Daniel Gilmore, Michael Johnson or Kepler Bradley ahead of Warnock as Aaron Sandilands' ruck partner. Warnock returned to the team for the second half of the year but a shoulder reconstruction ended his season premature. After constant media speculation that he would return to Melbourne, Warnock confirmed this at the end of the season.

On the final day of the 2008 trade week, Warnock was traded to his preferred new destination, Carlton, on a highly lucrative 4 year contract. The deal saw Warnock and Fremantle's No. 69 draft pick, in exchange for Carlton's No. 24, 56 and 72 draft picks in the 2008 AFL draft.

Warnock had pre-season ankle surgery in 2009. He was subsequently struck down by stress fractures in his foot during his first pre-season with Carlton, and missed the majority of 2009. He eventually played a handful of games with Carlton's VFL-affiliate, the Northern Bullants, late in the season, but did not make his debut for the Blues. Warnock had post-season ankle and shoulder surgery which delayed his start to the 2010 pre-season.

Warnock made his senior debut for the club in round 1, 2010 against Richmond. He played twelve matches for Carlton in 2010, and assumed the No. 1 ruck position on a permanent basis in 2011, playing twenty games. He had both shoulders reconstructed at the end of 2011, which delayed his start to the 2012 season. He had his 2012 season cut short due to a shoulder reconstruction and ankle surgery, but he signed a new lucrative 3-year contract in the same season.

Warnock played 12 games in 2013 due to a knee injury sustained mid year. He returned at the end of the year and again had an excellent finals series. He played the first 16 games of the 2014 season, and he only played 2 games in 2015 due to another shoulder reconstruction.

Warnock was delisted in October 2015. He retired from football at the end of 2015 due to medical advice.
