= Ethan Hughes =

Australian rules footballer (born 1994)

Personal information
- Full name: Ethan Hughes
- Born: 7 December 1994 (age 31); Greenmount, Western Australia
- Original team: Harvey Brunswick Leschenault (SWFL)
- Draft: No. 13, 2015 rookie draft
- Debut: Round 23, 2015, Fremantle vs. Port Adelaide, at Adelaide Oval
- Height: 188 cm (6 ft 2 in)
- Weight: 88 kg (194 lb)
- Position: Defender/wingman

Playing career
Years	Club	Games (Goals)
2015–2024	Fremantle	107 (6)

Career highlights
- 3x West Australian Football League premiership player: Peel Thunder: 2016, 2024; South Fremantle: 2025

Ethan Hughes (born 7 December 1994) is a former Australian rules footballer who played for the Fremantle Football Club in the Australian Football League (AFL). Hughes was drafted in the 2015 rookie draft, and went on to play 107 games for the Dockers as a Defender/Wingman, before being delisted following the 2024 season.

== Early career ==
Originally from Bunbury, Western Australia, he was drafted with the 13th selection in the 2015 Rookie Draft from Swan Districts in the West Australian Football League (WAFL). In 2015 he played for Peel Thunder in the WAFL, Fremantle's reserve team. Hughes was a part of Peel Thunder's inaugural premiership in 2016, defeating Subiaco by 23 points.

== AFL career ==
Hughes was named to make his AFL debut for Fremantle in the final round of the 2015 AFL season, during Fremantle's round twenty-three clash against Port Adelaide at the Adelaide Oval. Twelve changes were made to Fremantle's team, and Hughes was one of four players to make their AFL debuts. Hughes signed a contract extension during the 2016 AFL season tying him to Fremantle until at least the end of 2017.

After missing the opening two rounds of the 2017 AFL season, Hughes featured in every game except for Fremantle’s round 12 visit to Brisbane, playing 18 games and kicking his first goal. Hughes only played five games during the 2018 AFL season and signed a one-year contract extension at the end of 2018. The 2019 AFL season saw Hughes play a career best 21 out of a possible 22 games.

Hughes continued his run of career best form into 2020, playing every game and finishing seventh in Fremantle's Best and Fairest. As a versatile player, Hughes often found himself rotating between Fremantle's wing and backline during the 2023 AFL season. Hughes played his 100th game in round 20 during Fremantle's 7 point win over Geelong at Kardinia Park. Hughes suffered an ankle injury in Round 21 against the Brisbane Lions, and as a result was ruled out for the remainder of the season. He finished 2023 having played 20 games.

After playing only six games in 2024, Hughes was not offered a contract by Fremantle heading into 2025, seemingly ending his career at AFL level. He continued playing for Peel Thunder during their 2024 finals campaign, and was one of their better player during the grand final win over East Perth at Optus Stadium, becoming a two-time premiership player with the Thunder. Hughes moved to the South Fremantle Bulldogs in the WAFL for 2025 and won a third WAFL premiership there in that season.

== Statistics ==
Legend
G	Goals	K	Kicks	D	Disposals	T	Tackles
B	Behinds	H	Handballs	M	Marks

Season	Team	No.	Games	Totals							Averages (per game)							Votes
Season	Team	No.	Games	G	B	K	H	D	M	T	G	B	K	H	D	M	T	Votes
2015	Fremantle	42	1	0	0	12	10	22	8	3	0.0	0.0	12.0	10.0	22.0	8.0	3.0	0
2016	Fremantle	15	5	0	0	41	36	77	24	13	0.0	0.0	8.2	7.2	15.4	4.8	2.6	0
2017	Fremantle	15	18	1	0	157	130	287	93	31	0.1	0.0	8.7	7.2	15.9	5.2	1.7	0
2018	Fremantle	15	5	1	0	37	29	66	18	5	0.2	0.0	7.4	5.8	13.2	3.6	1.0	0
2019	Fremantle	15	21	2	2	176	159	335	100	27	0.1	0.1	8.4	7.6	16.0	4.8	1.3	0
2020 (Note: The 2020 season was played with 17 home-and-away matches per team (down from 22) and 16-minute quarters with time on (down from 20-minute quarters with time on) due to the impact of the COVID-19 pandemic.)	Fremantle	15	17	0	0	140	77	217	79	20	0.0	0.0	8.2	4.5	12.8	4.6	1.2	0
2021	Fremantle	15	8	0	1	75	64	139	29	12	0.0	0.1	9.4	8.0	17.4	3.6	1.5	0
2022	Fremantle	15	6	0	0	45	48	93	27	5	0.0	0.0	7.5	8.0	15.5	4.5	0.8	0
2023	Fremantle	15	20	2	1	157	110	267	85	35	0.1	0.1	7.9	5.5	13.4	4.3	1.8	0
2024	Fremantle	15	6	0	0	47	31	78	31	9	0.0	0.0	7.8	5.2	13.0	5.2	1.5	0
Career			107	6	4	887	694	1581	494	160	0.1	0.0	8.3	6.5	14.8	4.6	1.5	0
