= Travis Edmonds =

Australian rules footballer (born 1971)

Personal information
- Full name: Travis Ian Alexander Edmonds
- Born: 9 February 1971 (age 55)
- Draft: 75th, 1991 National Draft (Hawthorn); 35th, 1993 Pre-season Draft (West Coast)
- Height: 196 cm (6 ft 5 in)
- Weight: 91 kg (201 lb)
- Position: Ruckman

Playing career^{1}
Years	Club	Games (Goals)
1990–2005	Swan Districts	262 (80)
1995	Fremantle	1 (0)
Total		263 (80)

Representative team honours
Years	Team	Games (Goals)
1992–97	Western Australia	4 (2)
- ^{1} Playing statistics correct to the end of 2005.

Career highlights
- Swan Districts best and fairest 1992, 1993, 1997, 2000, 2001; Swan Districts captain 2000–02

Travis Ian Alexander Edmonds (born 9 February 1971) is a former Australian rules footballer who played for the Swan Districts Football Club in the West Australian Football League (WAFL). He was also drafted into the Australian Football League three times: to Hawthorn in 1991, to West Coast in 1993, and Fremantle in 1995, but only played one senior game, with Fremantle in 1995. Edmonds debuted for Swan Districts in 1990, and won club best and fairest awards in 1992, 1993, 1997, 2000, and 2001, as well as captaining the club from 2000 to 2002. He also played four interstate matches for Western Australia. Edmonds finished his career with 262 games for Swan Districts, a club record. After the conclusion of his WAFL career in 2005, he was recruited by the Carey Park Football Club in the South West Football League (SWFL), where he played two seasons, winning the league's best and fairest award, the Hayward Medal, in 2006 and captaining the club in 2007.

== Career ==
Edmonds debuted for Swan Districts in 1990, but did not play in the club's premiership in that year. At the 1991 National Draft, he was selected with the 75th pick overall by Hawthorn, but stayed in Perth, and was de-listed at the end of the season without playing a game for Hawthorn. After winning the Swan Medal in 1992 as Swan Districts' best and fairest player, he was selected by the West Coast Eagles with the 35th pick overall in the 1993 Pre-season Draft. He played one season at the club without playing a senior game, and was de-listed at the end of the 1993 season after AFL regulations forced the club to cut their list from 52 to 40 players. Edmonds again won the Swan Medal in 1993, and was one of the Fremantle Football Club's zone selections prior to their inaugural season in the Australian Football League. He made his senior debut for the club in round two of the 1995 season against Essendon at the WACA Ground, recording five disposals and three hit-outs in what was his only game at AFL level. Serving as captain of the club for three seasons from 2000 to 2002, Edmonds continued to play for Swan Districts until 2005, and again won club best and fairest awards in 1997, 2000, and 2001. In total, he played 262 games, a club record, as well as kicking 80 goals, a figure that would have been even larger but for shoulder and knee injuries that restricted him to six games in 1999 and nine in 1998.

After his retirement from the WAFL, Edmonds was recruited by the Carey Park Football Club in the South West Football League (SWFL), based in Bunbury. In 2006, his first season at the club, he played in a premiership side, winning the club's best and fairest as well as the Hayward Medal as the best player in the league. The following season, his last at the club, Edmonds was named co-captain with Shane Nani, and again won the best and fairest award. In March 2012, Edmonds was named one of the "Top 25 WAFL Players Over The Past 25 Years" at the launch of the 2012 season. Edmonds is also a life member of Swan Districts, and is the current treasurer of the club's Life Members Association.
