= Kingsley Hunter =

Australian rules footballer

Personal information
- Full name: Kingsley Hunter
- Born: 27 May 1975 (age 51)
- Original teams: Claremont, WAFL
- Draft: Fremantle: Zone Selection, 1994; Western Bulldogs: Trade for Brad Wira, 1998 Hawthorn: Selection 35, 2002
- Height: 191 cm (6 ft 3 in)
- Weight: 102 kg (225 lb)
- Positions: Full forward, Centre-half back

Playing career^{1}
Years	Club	Games (Goals)
1995–1998	Fremantle	41 (86)
1999–2002	Western Bulldogs	57 (28)
2003	Hawthorn	2 (1)
- ^{1} Playing statistics correct to the end of 2008.

Career highlights
- Fremantle leading Goalkicker: 1996, 1997; AFL Goal of the Year: 2000; AFL Rising Star nominee: 1996; Claremont leading Goalkicker: 1994, 1998

Kingsley Hunter (born 27 May 1975) is a former Australian rules footballer who played in the Australian Football League between 1995 and 2003.

He started his AFL career with the Fremantle Football Club in their inaugural year after being the leading goalkicker for WAFL team Claremont in 1994. He started slowly with Fremantle, playing only three goalless games in 1995, but impressed in 1996 by kicking the most goals for Fremantle and being awarded an AFL rising star nomination in round 14. The following year saw a continuation of his good goalkicking form, with a second consecutive goalkicking award for Fremantle, including a career-best 7 goals in a 100-point loss against Collingwood.

Despite kicking a goal in each of his 11 games in 1998, he was traded to the Western Bulldogs for the 1999 season. At the Bulldogs he often played in the backline and had three successful seasons between 2000 and 2002. In 2003 he went to Hawthorn but only managed 2 games before announcing his retirement from AFL football.

He returned to the WAFL in 2004, but switched to East Fremantle, rather than returning to Claremont before retiring from professional football at the end of 2005.

Kingsley was awarded the official AFL Goal of the Year for 2000 with a running goal which began in the defensive 50.
