= Tony Delaney =

Australian rules footballer

Personal information
- Full name: Anthony Damien Delaney
- Born: 27 December 1975 (age 50)
- Original team: Claremont (WAFL)
- Debut: Round 1, 28 March 1993, Essendon vs. West Coast Eagles, at Subiaco Oval

Playing career^{1}
Years	Club	Games (Goals)
1993–1994	Essendon	15 (9)
1995–1999	Fremantle	28 (11)
2000–2001	St Kilda	33 (6)
Total		76 (26)
- ^{1} Playing statistics correct to the end of 2001.

Anthony Damien Delaney (born 27 December 1975) is a former Australian rules footballer. He played as a midfielder.

During his nine years in the Australian Football League he played for three clubs, Essendon, Fremantle and St Kilda. Injuries restricted him to only 76 games in this time. He is most notable as being traded by Essendon to Fremantle along with Dale Kickett and Todd Ridley which enabled the Bombers to recruit star players Scott Lucas and Matthew Lloyd.

After he retired from the AFL he returned to the WAFL and played for Claremont from 2004 until 2006. He had previously played for South Fremantle during his time with Fremantle.
