= Josh Deluca =

Australian rules footballer (born 1996)

Personal information
- Full name: Joshua Deluca
- Born: 11 May 1996 (age 30)
- Original team: Subiaco (WAFL)
- Draft: No. 68, 2014 National draft, Fremantle; No. 60, 2016 Rookie draft, Fremantle; No. 50, 2017 Rookie draft, Fremantle No. 1, 2019 Mid-season draft, Carlton
- Height: 181 cm (5 ft 11 in)
- Weight: 85 kg (187 lb)
- Position: Midfielder

Playing career^{1}
Years	Club	Games (Goals)
2015–2017	Fremantle	4 (2)
2019	Carlton	6 (4)
Total		10 (6)
- ^{1} Playing statistics correct to the end of 2019.

Career highlights
- 2x Subiaco premiership player 2014, 2018; 2x Peel Thunder premiership player 2016, 2017; Simpson Medal 2019 (State Game)

Joshua Deluca (born 11 May 1996, also known as Josh Deluca-Cardillo) is a former professional Australian rules footballer who most recently played for the Carlton Football Club in the Australian Football League (AFL).

Deluca made his senior football debut in 2014 for Subiaco in the West Australian Football League (WAFL) and was a member of their 2014 WAFL Grand Final premiership winning team. He was then drafted with the 68th selection in the 2015 AFL national draft by Fremantle. In 2015 he switched to play for Peel Thunder in the West Australian Football League (WAFL), Fremantle's reserve team. He played in his second WAFL premiership in 2016 when Peel won their first ever flag.

Deluca was delisted, and re-drafted twice by Fremantle before he made his AFL debut for Fremantle in round 14 of the 2017 AFL season, when Fremantle lost to Geelong at Simonds Stadium by 2 points. He was again delisted by Fremantle at the conclusion of the 2017 season, after having played in his third WAFL premiership when Peel Thunder defeated Subiaco by 16 points.

Season 2018 saw Deluca return to the WAFL and re-join Subiaco. Once again, the season ended in another WAFL premiership win, his fourth, when Subiaco defeated West Perth in the first Grand Final held at Optus Stadium.

Deluca was selected in the WAFL State Team which played the SANFL as a curtain raiser to the Fremantle v Richmond game at Optus Stadium on 12 May 2019. His 29 possessions and a goal saw him voted WA's best player and was awarded the Simpson Medal.

On 27 May 2019, Deluca was selected with pick one in the mid season AFL draft by Carlton Football Club and later that year was not offered a new contract. After being delisted by the Blues, he remained in Victoria and signed with the Box Hill Hawks (Hawthorn's VFL/reserves team) in the hopes of resurrecting his AFL career once more.

On 10 October 2021, Deluca requested a trade out of Box Hill to head back to his home state, Western Australia. He returned to his home club (Subiaco) for the 2022 season onwards in the WAFL.
