= Scott Gooch =

Australian rules footballer and sports administrator

Scott Gooch (born 4 July 1975) is an Australian sports administrator and former Australian rules football player. Gooch is currently General Manager for Commercial Partners at the Fremantle Football Club.

== AFL career ==
Gooch played for West Australian Football League club Subiaco before being selected by the Fremantle Football Club as a Foundation Selection in 1994. Gooch was delisted and redrafted in the 1997 AFL Rookie draft before finally being delisted after the 1997 AFL season without playing an AFL match. Gooch played 42 WAFL matches for Subiaco.

== Work and career ==
=== West Coast Eagles ===
In 2000 Gooch joined AFL club West Coast Eagles, eventually becoming Relationship Marketing Manager.

=== Perth Glory ===
In March 2007 Gooch was appointed CEO of A-League team Perth Glory shortly after a change of ownership at the club. The new owners, Tony Sage, Brett McKeon and John Spence, unveiled Gooch as CEO at the same time as announcing a new major sponsorship deal. This led to a flurry of media interest in a club which had fallen into hard times.

=== Fremantle ===
Gooch rejoined Fremantle in April 2009 as General Manager - Commercial Partners.

=== PlayBook X ===
In 2021 Scott Gooch started a sports and marketing business called Playbook X based in perth WA.
