= Stuart Anderson (Australian footballer) =

Australian rules footballer, born 1974

Personal information
- Full name: Stuart Desmond Anderson
- Born: 27 June 1974 (age 52); Sale, Victoria
- Original team: Wesley College, Melbourne
- Debut: Round 6, 1994, North Melbourne vs. West Coast Eagles, at the MCG

Playing career^{1}
Years	Club	Games (Goals)
1994–1997	North Melbourne	61 (20)
1998	Fremantle	9 (3)
Total		70 (23)
- ^{1} Playing statistics correct to the end of 1998.

Career highlights
- AFL premiership player: 1996; AFL Rising Star nominee: 1995

For the 1930s North Melbourne player, see Stewart Anderson (footballer).

Stuart Desmond Anderson (born 27 June 1974) is a former Australian rules footballer who played for North Melbourne and Fremantle Dockers in the Australian Football League (AFL).

Born in Sale and educated at Wesley College, Melbourne, Anderson was drafted by North Melbourne at pick 35 at the 1990 AFL draft. He played 61 games as a midfielder/half-forward for North, including the 1996 premiership.

At the end of the 1997 AFL season Anderson was traded to Fremantle in return for Winston Abraham. His career declined after the move west, only managing to play 9 games in 1998 AFL season after failing to be selected in the league team at the beginning of the 1999 AFL season, Anderson left Fremantle mid season.

Anderson played 21 first eleven games for Melbourne Cricket Club between 1992/93 and 2000/01.

He is the cousin of Australian comedian Wil Anderson.

== Statistics ==
Legend
G	Goals	K	Kicks	D	Disposals	T	Tackles
B	Behinds	H	Handballs	M	Marks

Season	Team	No.	Games	Totals							Averages (per game)							Votes
Season	Team	No.	Games	G	B	K	H	D	M	T	G	B	K	H	D	M	T	Votes
1994	North Melbourne	5	3	2	1	13	8	21	0	0	0.7	0.3	4.3	2.7	7.0	0.0	0.0	0
1995	North Melbourne	5	16	0	1	154	98	252	45	13	0.0	0.1	9.6	6.1	15.8	2.8	0.8	1
1996†	North Melbourne	5	22	11	12	177	121	298	45	21	0.5	0.5	8.0	5.5	13.5	2.0	1.0	1
1997	North Melbourne	5	20	7	6	120	81	201	34	15	0.4	0.3	6.0	4.1	10.1	1.7	0.8	0
1998	Fremantle	6	9	3	2	62	41	103	30	6	0.3	0.2	6.9	4.6	11.4	3.3	0.7	0
Career			70	23	22	526	349	875	154	55	0.3	0.3	7.5	5.0	12.5	2.2	0.8	2
