= Keren Ugle =

Australian rules footballer

Personal information
- Born: 7 July 1979 (age 47)
- Original team: South Fremantle (WAFL)
- Debut: Round 16, 2001, Fremantle vs. Carlton, at Optus Oval

Playing career^{1}
Years	Club	Games (Goals)
2001	Fremantle	4 (2)
- ^{1} Playing statistics correct to the end of 2001.

Keren Ugle (born 7 July 1979) is an Australian rules footballer who played for the Fremantle Dockers. He was drafted from South Fremantle in the WAFL as the 5th selection in the 2001 AFL Rookie Draft. He played four games for Fremantle in 2001, mainly as a forward before being delisted at the end of the season. He then returned to WAFL and played for South Fremantle, playing a total of 175 games, including in South's 2005 WAFL premiership winning side.

Ugle's younger brothers Dane and Liam also played in the WAFL, and all three played cricket together at the Sydney Cricket Ground in an all indigenous team.
