= Luke Pratt =

Australian rules footballer (born 1989)

Personal information
- Full name: Luke Pratt
- Born: 8 October 1989 (age 37); Canberra, Australia
- Original team: Swan Districts
- Height: 183 cm (6 ft 0 in)
- Weight: 74 kg (163 lb)

Playing career^{1}
Years	Club	Games (Goals)
2009	Fremantle	1 (0)
- ^{1} Playing statistics correct to the end of 2009.

Luke Pratt (born 8 October 1989) is an Australian rules footballer. He plays as a running defender and was selected by AFL club Fremantle with their second selection (22nd overall) in the 2007 AFL Rookie draft.

Pratt played for Swan Districts in the West Australian Football League between 2008 and 2010 after being a member of their 2007 Colts Premiership winning team.

In May 2009 Pratt was elevated to the senior list when Rhys Palmer was moved to the long-term injury list. He then made his AFL debut for Fremantle in Round 7 of the 2009 AFL season at Carrara Stadium against Carlton, as a replacement for the injured Ryan Crowley. That was his first and only AFL game. At times during the game he played on former Swan Districts teammate and fellow first game player Chris Yarran.

He was not offered another contract after the 2009 season.
