= Casey Sibosado =

Australian rules footballer

Personal information
- Full name: Casey Sibosado
- Born: 13 October 1990 (age 36)
- Original team: Oakleigh Chargers (TAC Cup)/Xavier College
- Draft: No. 3, 2009 Rookie Draft, Fremantle
- Height: 192 cm (6 ft 4 in)
- Weight: 86 kg (190 lb)
- Position: Defender

Playing career^{1}
Years	Club	Games (Goals)
2011	Fremantle	1 (1)
- ^{1} Playing statistics correct to the end of 2011.

Casey Sibosado (born 13 October 1990) is an Australian rules footballer who played for the Fremantle Football Club in the Australian Football League (AFL).

== Football career ==
Originally from Lombadina, near Broome in the north-west of West Australia, he was recruited from the Oakleigh Chargers in the TAC Cup with the third selection in the 2009 Rookie Draft. He played for the Chargers whilst attending Xavier College in Melbourne. He also played for the Northern Territory Thunder in the 2008 AFL Under 18 Championships.

Sibosado played for Claremont in the West Australian Football League (WAFL) but switched to Perth during 2010 to get more opportunities at senior level.

Sibosado made his AFL debut in the final round of the 2011 AFL season, replacing Luke McPharlin who was a late withdrawal from the team. Due to an unprecedented run of injuries, Fremantle had to be given special permission to elevate Sibosado and Joel Houghton off their rookie list to enable the team to name a full 25-person squad for the final match of the season. He kicked a goal with his first kick in AFL football.

He was delisted by Fremantle at the conclusion of the 2011 season.
