= Daniel Metropolis =

Australian rules footballer

Personal information
- Born: 17 March 1972 (age 54)
- Original team: Subiaco (WAFL)
- Debut: Round 3, 1992, West Coast Eagles vs. St Kilda, at Subiaco Oval

Playing career^{1}
Years	Club	Games (Goals)
1992–2000	West Coast	108 (46)
2001	Fremantle	6 (2)
Total		114 (48)
- ^{1} Playing statistics correct to the end of 2001.

Daniel Metropolis (born 17 March 1972) is a former Australian rules footballer who played for the West Coast Eagles and the Fremantle Dockers between 1992 and 2001.

== Career ==
The son of former Subiaco player Peter Metropolis, he was drafted from Subiaco in the WAFL with selection 16 in the 1991 AFL draft. Metropolis starred in his debut game in 1992 against St Kilda, kicking 6 goals, including four goals with his first four kicks in the AFL. This was his highest goal scoring game, spending most of the remainder of his career playing as a defender.

After only missing one game during the 1999 and 2000 seasons, he was traded to Fremantle along with the 51st selection in return for Greg Harding. He only played six games for Fremantle before injuring his knee at the end of the 2001 season. Metropolis announced his retirement after not playing a game in the 2002 AFL season.
