= Leigh Wardell-Johnson =

Australian rules footballer

Personal information
- Born: 17 March 1970 (age 56)
- Original team: Claremont (WAFL)
- Debut: Round 2, 1995, Fremantle vs. Essendon, at the WACA

Playing career^{1}
Years	Club	Games (Goals)
1995	Fremantle	11 (10)
- ^{1} Playing statistics correct to the end of 1995.

Leigh Wardell-Johnson (born 17 March 1970) is an Australian rules footballer who played for the Fremantle Dockers in 1995. He was drafted from Claremont in the WAFL as a foundation selection in the 1994 AFL draft and played as a half-forward.
