= Craig Burrows =

Australian rules footballer, born 1972

Personal information
- Full name: Craig Robert Burrows
- Born: 20 December 1972 (age 53); Geraldton, Western Australia
- Original team: East Fremantle (WAFL)
- Debut: Round 1, 1 April 1995, Fremantle. vs. Richmond., at the MCG

Playing career^{1}
Years	Club	Games (Goals)
1995–1997	Fremantle	20 (23)
- ^{1} Playing statistics correct to the end of 1997.

Career highlights
- 1994 WAFL Premiership with East Fremantle; State of origin Western Australia 1995; Won the B.O.G award in Fremantle's first match

Craig Robert Burrows (born 20 December 1972) is an Australian rules footballer. He plays as a centre half-forward and began his football career at East Fremantle.

== Fremantle Dockers ==
Burrows was drafted by Fremantle in 1995 after playing a starring role for East Fremantle in their 1994 WAFL Grand Final win. He was originally from the WA country town of Geraldton which is famous for producing Eagles star Chris Mainwaring (who also played for East Fremantle). A highlight for Craig was winning the Channel 7 Best on Ground medal in Fremantle's very first game (a practice match against Essendon).

He made his AFL debut in Fremantle's first ever game in 1995 and cemented his spot as the team's centre half-forward, playing 19 of the 22 games and kicking 23 goals. He was selected to represent Western Australia in the State of Origin game against The Allies. 1996 however was a bad year for Burrows as he injured his knee in training and missed the entire season. He returned from injury in 1997 but only played one game for Fremantle and was delisted at the end of the season.
