= Ricky Mott =

Australian rules footballer

Personal information
- Born: 21 April 1981 (age 45); Western Australia
- Original team: South Fremantle (WAFL)
- Debut: Round 1, 31 March 2002, Sydney vs. Brisbane Lions, at the SCG
- Height: 200 cm (6 ft 7 in)
- Weight: 108 kg (238 lb)

Playing career^{1}
Years	Club	Games (Goals)
2002	Sydney	17 (3)
2004	Carlton	2 (0)
Total		19 (3)
- ^{1} Playing statistics correct to the end of 2004.

Career highlights
- Northern Bullants leading goalkicker (2004)

Ricky Mott (born 21 April 1981) is a former Australian rules footballer in the Australian Football League.

== Career ==
Originally from country Western Australia, he played for the Kukerin/Dumbleyung Cougars and worked on a farm as a young man, following the sudden death of his father in 1998. He nominated for the 1999 and 2000 AFL drafts but was not selected.

In 2001 he joined the South Fremantle Football Club and was drafted by the Sydney Swans late in the 2001 AFL draft (at pick 74). Due to injuries to favoured Swans ruckmen Jason Ball and Stephen Doyle early in the year, Mott made his debut in Round 1 of the 2002 season.

Despite a solid season in 2002, playing 17 matches, he soon fell out of favour when he turned up to a training session overweight. He was then rookie listed by the Fremantle Dockers in 2003 without playing a game.

Mott was given another chance at the 2003 AFL draft when he was drafted by Carlton. However, he only played 2 AFL games with the club, and was delisted at the end of the 2004 season. He was the leading goalkicker for Carlton's reserves team, the Northern Bullants, for the 2004 Victorian Football League (VFL) season, kicking 19 goals.

=== Essendon internet hoax ===
In 2006 he won Country All-Australian selection for Western Australia in the Aus Country Championships and as part of an internet hoax, was touted as a possible recruit for the Essendon Football Club. The Age, however, ran a story on this, falsely believing it to be true.
