= 2016 WAFL season =

Australian rules football season

- Teams: 9
- Premiers: Peel Thunder; 1st premiership
- Minor premiers: Subiaco; 14th minor premiership
- Sandover Medallist: Jye Bolton; Claremont (49 votes)
- Bernie Naylor Medallist: Ben Saunders; South Fremantle (52 goals)

The 2016 WAFL season was the 132nd season of the various incarnations of the West Australian Football League (WAFL). The season concluded on 25 September 2016 with the 2016 WAFL Grand Final between Subiaco and Peel Thunder at Domain Stadium. Peel won the match by 23 points, recording their first premiership.

== Ladder ==
2016 ladder
Pos	Team	Pld	W	L	D	PF	PA	PP	Pts
1	Subiaco	20	16	4	0	1798	1263	142.4	64
2	South Fremantle	20	15	5	0	1820	1397	130.3	60
3	West Perth	20	13	7	0	1504	1438	104.6	52
4	Peel Thunder (P)	20	11	9	0	1421	1382	102.8	44
5	East Perth	20	10	10	0	1411	1415	99.7	40
6	East Fremantle	20	9	11	0	1523	1611	94.5	36
7	Claremont	20	7	13	0	1728	1479	116.8	28
8	Perth	20	7	13	0	1315	1729	76.1	28
9	Swan Districts	20	2	18	0	1127	1933	58.3	8

Source: WAFL Footy Facts
Rules for classification: 1) points; 2) percentage; 3) number of points for.
(P) Premiers

== Finals series ==
=== Elimination and qualifying finals ===
	Elimination final
Sunday 4 September (3:10 pm)	Peel Thunder 12.14 (86)	def.	East Perth 5.7 (37)	Bendigo Bank Stadium (crowd: 2,834)
Peel Thunder's first win in a finals game.

	Qualifying final
Saturday 3 September (2:10 pm)	South Fremantle 18.13 (121)	def.	West Perth 10.9 (69)	Fremantle Community Bank Oval (crowd: 3,727)

=== Semi-finals ===
	First semi-final
Sunday 11 September (2:15 pm)	West Perth 7.3 (45)	def. by	Peel Thunder 15.15 (105)	HBF Arena (crowd: 3,073)	Report

	Second semi-final
Sunday 11 September (3:10 pm)	Subiaco 14.12 (96)	def.	South Fremantle 9.2 (56)	Medibank Stadium (crowd: 2,834)	Report

=== Preliminary final ===
	Preliminary final
Sunday 18 September (2:40 pm)	South Fremantle 10.10 (70)	def. by	Peel Thunder 16.13 (109)	Fremantle Community Bank Oval (crowd: 4,155)	Report
Peel Thunder qualified for their first Grand Final.

=== Grand Final ===
2016 WAFL Grand Final
Sunday 25 September (2:30 pm)	Subiaco	def. by	Peel Thunder	Domain Stadium (crowd: 15,031)	Report
1.0 (6); 5.3 (33); 7.7 (49); 8.8 (56)	Q1; Q2; Q3; Final	4.6 (30); 7.6 (48); 9.11 (65); 11.13 (79)	Umpires: Nathan Williamson, Mark Worobec, Justin Power; Simpson Medal: Connor Blakely (Peel Thunder); Television broadcast: Seven Network
2: Horsley; 1: Ryan, Stevenson, Wheeler, Twomey, Robinson, Phelan	Goals	5: Yarran; 3: Ugle; 1: Mzungu, Apeness, Langdon
Horsley, Cockie, Broughton, Jackson, Delahunty, Phelan	Best	Langdon, Yarran, Blakely, Mzungu, de Boer, Silvagni, Nyhuis, Ugle, O'Brien
Peel Thunder won their first premiership, and became the first team to win a premiership from 4th place since 1965.
