= Tim Ruffles =

Australian rules footballer (born 1990)

Personal information
- Full name: Tim Ruffles
- Born: 5 October 1990 (age 36); Narrandera, New South Wales, Australia
- Original team: North Ballarat Rebels (TAC Cup)
- Draft: No. 68, 2008 National Draft, Fremantle
- Height: 180 cm (5 ft 11 in)
- Weight: 78 kg (172 lb)

Playing career^{1}
Years	Club	Games (Goals)
2009–2011	Fremantle	5 (2)
- ^{1} Playing statistics correct to the end of 2011.

Tim Ruffles (born 5 October 1990) was an Australian rules footballer who played for the Fremantle Football Club in the Australian Football League (AFL).

== AFL career ==
Originally from Narrandera in southern New South Wales, he attended Ballarat and Clarendon College. Ruffles was recruited by Fremantle with selection 68 in the 2008 AFL draft from the North Ballarat Rebels in the TAC Cup. He represented NSW at the 2008 AFL Under 18 Championships. Upon moving to Western Australia he was allocated to the Perth Football Club in the West Australian Football League (WAFL). After kicking five goals in a game for Perth against East Perth, Ruffles was named in the Fremantle squad, but was cut from the final team. Ruffles made his AFL debut at AAMI Stadium in Fremantle's match against the Adelaide Crows in Round 15.

In July 2009, in his third game, Ruffles played in Fremantle's win over the West Coast Eagles in the 30th Western Derby, kicking 2 goals, but rupturing his left anterior cruciate ligament in the final minutes.

He returned to the AFL in July 2010, but then was dropped back to the WAFL. He was recalled again to the Fremantle side for their Round 21 match against Hawthorn in Tasmania, when many senior players were rested from the long trip. The game resulted in a 116-point loss for the Dockers, and Ruffles hurt his right knee, which also required a knee reconstruction.

On 13 October 2010, Ruffles was delisted by Fremantle, although as a contracted player for the 2011 season, he was later re-drafted onto the rookie list.
