= Josh Head =

Australian rules footballer (born 1983)

Personal information
- Born: 7 April 1983 (age 43)
- Original team: South Fremantle (WAFL)
- Debut: Rd 14, 2008, Fremantle vs. Essendon, at Subiaco Oval
- Height: 188 cm (6 ft 2 in)
- Weight: 84 kg (185 lb)

Playing career^{1}
Years	Club	Games (Goals)
2008–2009	Fremantle	9 (1)
- ^{1} Playing statistics correct to the end of 2009.

Josh Head (born 7 April 1983) is a former Australian rules footballer for the Fremantle Football Club in the Australian Football League (AFL). He was selected with the 6th selection in the 2007 AFL Pre-season Draft from the South Fremantle Football Club in the WAFL. He had previously been selected by Fremantle onto their rookie list in 2002 and 2003, but was delisted without playing an AFL game.

Head spent most of the 2002 and 2003 seasons suffering from a groin and shoulder injuries and only played three league WAFL games in each of those two seasons. He recovered in 2006 to play 14 games before cementing his position as a long kicking rebounding defender with South Fremantle in 2007 playing 22 games and finishing second in the club's best and fairest award.

In a surprising move, Fremantle then selected him with their only selection in the 2007 pre-season draft. He made his debut in round 14 of the 2008 AFL season as a late replacement for Luke McPharlin in Fremantle's 4-point loss to Essendon at Subiaco Oval. Head was delisted from Fremantle at the end of 2009.
