= Brad Dodd =

Australian rules footballer

Personal information
- Full name: Bradley Dodd
- Born: 23 March 1977 (age 49)
- Original team: East Fremantle (WAFL)
- Debut: Round 1, 29 March 1998, Fremantle vs. Melbourne, at Subiaco Oval

Playing career^{1}
Years	Club	Games (Goals)
1998–2001	Fremantle	50 (24)
- ^{1} Playing statistics correct to the end of 2001.

Career highlights
- Beacon Award, Fremantle, 1998

Bradley Dodd (born 23 March 1977) is a former Australian rules footballer in the Australian Football League (AFL).

Dodd was originally rookie drafted by the Fremantle Football Club in 1997 AFL draft from East Fremantle in the West Australian Football League (WAFL) and was elevated to the senior list in 1998, where he made his debut against Melbourne in round 1 of that season. Dodd played 20 out of a possible 22 games in his debut season, finishing the year with nine goals. In 1999 he played just six games, before playing 20 games again in 2000, kicking 10 goals.

Dodd played his last AFL game against Richmond at Subiaco Oval in round 10, 2001, when he suffered an injury to his knee, requiring a reconstruction. He played 50 games over four seasons at the club and although he remained on the team list during the 2002 AFL season, he was delisted after not playing a game in 2002.

Dodd punched West Coast Eagles player Phillip Read in a Western Derby, dubbed the "Demolition Derby" in Round 21, 2000. After seeing Read involved in an altercation with some of his teammates, Dodd punched Read, earning a suspension.

After Fremantle, he signed on to play with Claremont in the WAFL, helping the team reach the grand final in 2003, but lost to South Fremantle, with Dodd being sent off after being reported twice in the game. He retired at the end of the 2005 WAFL season.

He is the cousin of former Dockers player, Steven Dodd.
