= Mark Gale =

Australian rules footballer

Personal information
- Born: 7 May 1976 (age 50)
- Original team: Claremont (WAFL)
- Debut: Round 14, 1995, Fremantle vs. Melbourne, at Subiaco Oval

Playing career^{1}
Years	Club	Games (Goals)
1995–2000	Fremantle	71 (18)
2001	St Kilda	13 (3)
Total		84 (21)
- ^{1} Playing statistics correct to the end of 2001.

Mark Gale (born 7 May 1976) is a former Australian rules footballer who played in the Australian Football League (AFL). He played for both the Fremantle Football Club and the St Kilda Football Club, mainly as a wingman.

He was first drafted from Claremont in the West Australian Football League as a foundation selection in the 1994 AFL draft, before being delisted at the end of the 2000 season. St Kilda then selected him with the 64th selection of the 2001 AFL draft.

Gale struggled to break into the Fremantle side, playing only five games in the club's first two seasons, before establishing himself in the team during the 1997 season. He would play all 22 games in the 1998 season, before injuries and poor form saw him delisted at the end of the 2000 season. He played just the single season at the Saints before retiring from football at the end of 2001.

He is the son of professional golfer Terry Gale and married to former Channel 9 Perth reporter and current Real Estate agent Kate Gale in 2001. He is currently employed at Scotch College in Perth.
