= Ryan Nyhuis =

Australian rules footballer

Personal information
- Full name: Ryan Nyhuis
- Born: 6 September 1996 (age 30)
- Original team: NT Thunder (NEAFL)
- Draft: No. 34, 2016 rookie draft
- Height: 188 cm (6 ft 2 in)
- Weight: 88 kg (194 lb)
- Position: Defender

Club information
- Current club: Fremantle
- Number: 43

Playing career^{1}
Years	Club	Games (Goals)
2016–2019	Fremantle	17 (5)
- ^{1} Playing statistics correct to the end of 2018.

Career highlights
- 2x Peel Thunder premiership player: 2016, 2017

Ryan Nyhuis (born 6 September 1996) is a professional Australian rules footballer who last played for the Fremantle Football Club in the Australian Football League (AFL).

Drafted with the 34th selection in the 2016 rookie draft from the Nightcliff Football Club in the Northern Territory Football League (NTFL) and the Northern Territory Football Club in the North East Australian Football League (NEAFL), he played for Peel Thunder in the West Australian Football League (WAFL), Fremantle's reserve team during the 2016 season, including the club's first ever WAFL premiership.

Nyhuis continued to play for Peel throughout 2017 and made his AFL debut for Fremantle in round 16 of the 2017 AFL season against North Melbourne at Etihad Stadium, as a late replacement for David Mundy. In a surprising move, Nyhuis played as a forward, despite having almost exclusively previously played as a defender. He kicked a goal with his first kick in AFL football and then kicked a further three including the last two of the match to help Fremantle win by 4 points. Nyhuis was delisted from Fremantle at the conclusion of the 2019 AFL season.
