= Martin Whitelaw =

Australian rules footballer (born 1976)

Personal information
- Born: 22 May 1976 (age 50)
- Original team: West Perth (WAFL)
- Debut: Round 21, 1997, Fremantle vs. Geelong, at Subiaco

Playing career^{1}
Years	Club	Games (Goals)
1997	Fremantle	1 (0)
- ^{1} Playing statistics correct to the end of 1997.

Martin Whitelaw (born 22 May 1976) is an Australian rules footballer who played for the Fremantle Dockers between 1997 and 1998. He was drafted from West Perth in the WAFL as a zone selection in the 1995 AFL draft and played as a ruckman. He is noted for being the only recorded ruckman to have led all players in hitouts in every AFL match he played.
