= Andrew Siegert =

Australian rules footballer, born 1982

Personal information
- Born: 18 January 1982 (age 44)
- Original team: Geelong Falcons
- Debut: Round 1, 31 March 2002, Fremantle vs. West Coast, at Subiaco

Playing career^{1}
Years	Club	Games (Goals)
2002–2005	Fremantle	36 (5)
- ^{1} Playing statistics correct to the end of 2005.

Career highlights
- South Fremantle premiership side 2009

Andrew Martin Siegert (born 18 January 1982) is an Australian rules footballer. He made his debut in 2002 for Fremantle in the Australian Football League and was known for his hard approach as a tagger or "run-with" player.

Recruited from the Geelong Falcons in the TAC Cup and originally from Colac, Victoria, he had a solid debut season in 2002, playing 21 games, but only managed a further 15 games over the next three seasons. At the end of the 2005 season, Fremantle delisted Siegert. He trained with Geelong, but was not picked up by an AFL club in the subsequent pre-season draft.

He remained in Western Australia and continued to play for South Fremantle in the West Australian Football League (WAFL) until retiring in 2010.
