= Greg Harding =

Australian rules footballer (born 1976)

Personal information
- Born: 17 September 1976 (age 50)
- Original team: Claremont (WAFL)

Playing career^{1}
Years	Club	Games (Goals)
1996–2000	Fremantle	69 (3)
2001	West Coast	9 (0)
Total		78 (3)

Coaching career^{3}
Years	Club	Games (W–L–D)
2011–	Swan Districts	104 (55–49–0)
- ^{1} Playing statistics correct to the end of 2001.^{3} Coaching statistics correct as of 2015.

Career highlights
- AFL Rising Star nominee: 1996; Claremont best and fairest 2003

Greg Harding (born 17 September 1976) is an Australian rules footballer. He played for both the Fremantle Football Club and the West Coast Eagles in the Australian Football League (AFL). He was drafted by Fremantle from Claremont in the West Australian Football League (WAFL) as a zone selection in the 1995 AFL draft and played mainly as a defender.

He made his AFL debut in the opening round Western Derby in 1996. In round 4 of that year, he was awarded the weekly nomination for the AFL Rising Star award. In 1997 he had his best season for Fremantle, playing in 18 games and coming fifth in the club's best and fairest award.

Injuries and poor form hampered his career after 1997, and he played only a further 33 games in the next three seasons for Fremantle before being traded to the West Coast Eagles in return for Daniel Metropolis and a draft selection that would be used to draft Dion Woods.

His career at West Coast was brief, with only 9 games in 2001 before he again succumbed to injury. In total he underwent 12 operations during his time in the AFL. After being delisted by West Coast at the end of the 2002 season, Harding continued to play for Claremont, being appointed their vice-captain in 2003 and 2004 and winning their best and fairest award in 2003.

Greg Harding was the Swan Districts Football Club colts' coach. He took the colts to a premiership in 2008, and consecutive finals in 2009 and 2010. On 27 October 2010, Harding was appointed the head coach of the league side for Swan Districts Football Club.
