= Brendon Feddema =

Australian rules footballer

Personal information
- Born: 14 May 1974 (age 52)
- Original team: East Fremantle (WAFL)
- Debut: Round 7, 1998, Fremantle vs. Hawthorn, at WACA

Playing career^{1}
Years	Club	Games (Goals)
1998	Fremantle	3 (0)
- ^{1} Playing statistics correct to the end of 1998.

Brendon Feddema (born 14 May 1974) is an Australian rules footballer who played for the Fremantle Dockers between 1996 and 1998. He was drafted from East Fremantle in the WAFL as a zone selection in the 1995 AFL draft and played mainly as a key forward.

He had previously played basketball with Regis University in the United States.
