= Quenton Leach =

Australian rules footballer (1972–2020)

Personal information
- Full name: Quenton Harold Leach
- Born: 20 August 1972
- Died: 7 April 2020 (aged 47)
- Original team: Claremont (WAFL)
- Debut: Round 1, 1995, Fremantle vs. Richmond, at Melbourne Cricket Ground

Playing career^{1}
| Years | Club | Games (Goals) |
| 1991–1998 | Claremont | 61 (9) |
| 1995–1998 | Fremantle | 56 (26) |
| 1995–1998 | Subiaco | 19 (6) |
| Total | | 126 (41) |
- ^{1} Playing statistics correct to the end of 1998.

Career highlights
- Claremont premiership side 1993

Quenton Harold Leach (20 August 1972 – 7 April 2020) was an Australian rules footballer who played in the Australian Football League (AFL) for the Fremantle Dockers between 1995 and 1998. He was drafted from Claremont in the West Australian Football League (WAFL) as a foundation selection in the 1994 AFL draft and played mainly as a defender. He played for Marist Football Club in Churchlands in his junior career before being signed to Claremont.

Leach played most of his football in the backline, but he is best remembered for kicking a goal after the siren to win a game against Brisbane in 1997. Fremantle were behind by one point when Leach took a mark about 30 metres from goal on a moderate angle just seconds before the siren sounded to end the game. His kick after the siren went straight through the goals, and Fremantle won the game by 5 points.

In November 2016, Leach revealed that he had testicular cancer. In July 2017, it was reported that two rounds of chemotherapy had been successful in treating the cancer. However, in April 2020, Leach died from the cancer.

== See also ==
- After the siren kicks in Australian rules football
