= Michael Clark (sportsman) =

Australian rules footballer, born 1978

Personal information
- Full name: Michael Wayne Clark
- Born: 31 March 1978 (age 48); Perth, Western Australia
- Original team: Swan Districts (WAFL)
- Draft: Fremantle: Zone selection, 1995 Collingwood: 88th overall, 1999
- Height: 191 cm (6 ft 3 in)
- Weight: 86 kg (190 lb)

Playing career^{1}
Years	Club	Games (Goals)
1996–1999	Fremantle	1 (0)
2000	Collingwood	0 (0)
- ^{1} Playing statistics correct to the end of 2000.

Michael Clark
Cricket information
- Batting: Right-handed
- Bowling: Left-arm medium-fast
- Role: Bowler

Domestic team information
- Years: Team
- 2001/02–2005/06: Western Australia
- 2003: Warwickshire
- LA debut: 16 January 2002 Western Australia v Victoria
- Last LA: 4 November 2005 West Australia v New South Wales
- FC debut: 18 January 2002 Western Australia v Victoria
- Last FC: 17 October 2004 Western Australia v Tasmania

Career statistics
Competition	First-class	List A
Matches	17	12
Runs scored	139	58
Batting average	10.69	29.00
100s/50s	0/0	0/0
Top score	26	27
Balls bowled	2,904	593
Wickets	49	17
Bowling average	28.71	30.58
5 wickets in innings	1	0
10 wickets in match	0	0
Best bowling	5/47	3/34
Catches/stumpings	10/–	5/–
- Source: CricketArchive, 5 October 2008

Michael Wayne Clark (born 31 March 1978) is an Australian former cricketer and Australian rules footballer.

== Football career ==
Clark had shoulder problems when he played with Swan Districts in 1996, and in 1997 required a knee reconstruction.

The son of former Australian Test cricketer Wayne Clark, he pursued a career in the Australian Football League with the Fremantle Dockers. Drafted in the 1997 AFL draft, he played only 1 game with the Dockers in 1999. He was delisted at the end of that year to be re-drafted by the Collingwood Football Club in the 1999 AFL draft, but did not manage a senior game with the club, being delisted during the 2000 season after fracturing his fibula.

== Cricket career ==
He made his debut with Western Australia in the 2000–2001 season, and after chronic back-injury problems, announced his retirement from cricket in February 2006.
