= Phil Gilbert =

Australian rules footballer

Personal information
- Full name: Phillip David Gilbert
- Born: 15 November 1969 (age 56); Mount Barker, Western Australia
- Original team: Claremont (WAFL)
- Debut: Round 1, 1993, Melbourne vs. Hawthorn, at Waverley Park
- Height: 185 cm (6 ft 1 in)
- Weight: 89 kg (196 lb)

Playing career^{1}
Years	Club	Games (Goals)
1988–1992, 1995-1996	Claremont	61 (26)
1992–1994	Melbourne	25 (6)
1995–1996	Fremantle	14 (2)
1997–1998	Peel	11 (3)
Total		111 (37)
- ^{1} Playing statistics correct to the end of 1996.

Phillip David Gilbert (born 15 November 1969) is an Australian rules footballer. He played for both the Melbourne and Fremantle Football Clubs in the Australian Football League. He was drafted from Clarement in the WAFL by Melbourne with the 19th selection in the 1991 AFL draft and played mainly as a defender.

He is most frequently remembered as being the player traded by Melbourne to Fremantle in exchange for a pick in the 1994 AFL draft which was used to recruit the 17-year-old Jeff Farmer, who would go on to become an All-Australian and score over 400 goals in AFL football. Fremantle would only have 14 games from Gilbert.

After being delisted by Fremantle at the end of the 1996 season, Gilbert moved to Mandurah and became the inaugural captain of the Peel Thunder Football Club, an expansion team in the WAFL. He later became coach of the Pinjarra Tigers in the Peel Football League and in 2004 returned to Peel Thunder to be an assistant coach, working alongside head coach Garry Hocking.

He is currently the director for Great Southern Football Academy (Clontarf) at North Albany Senior High School but previously worked as a real estate salesman in the Peel Region.
