= Greg Broughton =

Australian rules footballer

Personal information
- Full name: Gregory Frank Broughton
- Born: 29 September 1986 (age 40)
- Original team: Subiaco (WAFL)
- Draft: No. 74, 2009 Rookie Draft, Fremantle; No. 79 (RP), 2009 National Draft, Fremantle
- Height: 185 cm (6 ft 1 in)
- Weight: 87 kg (192 lb)
- Position: Midfielder

Playing career^{1}
Years	Club	Games (Goals)
2009–2012	Fremantle	68 (15)
2013–2015	Gold Coast	42 (4)
Total		110 (19)
- ^{1} Playing statistics correct to the end of 2015.

Gregory Frank Broughton (born 29 September 1986) is a former professional Australian rules footballer who played for the Fremantle Football Club and Gold Coast Football Club in the Australian Football League (AFL).

After playing in Subiaco's 2006, 2007 and 2008 WAFL premiership winning teams and winning the 2008 Tom Outridge Medal as Subiaco's best and fairest player, Broughton was drafted to Fremantle in the 2009 Rookie Draft with Fremantle's final selection, number 74 overall. After displaying good form as a small defender during the 2009 pre-season, he was elevated to Fremantle's senior list as a nominated rookie, along with Matt de Boer.

Broughton made his AFL debut for Fremantle in Round 3 of the 2009 AFL season at Subiaco Oval against Adelaide. In 2009, Broughton averaged 23 possessions with a high of 37 against Port Adelaide in Round 19.

In December 2006, before he was drafted by Fremantle, Broughton suffered a fractured eye socket in a nightclub incident allegedly involving Fremantle players Jeff Farmer and Steven Dodd. Farmer retired from AFL football a few months before Broughton was drafted to Fremantle, but Dodd was a teammate of Broughton's. No charges were laid following the incident.

Broughton's father, who is part Maori, was from Pātea in New Zealand and moved to Australia when he was 20 years old.

Following the end of the 2012 AFL season, Broughton was traded from Fremantle to Gold Coast.

He announced his retirement in September 2015, effective after the round 23 match against Sydney.

== Statistics ==
Legend
G	Goals	K	Kicks	D	Disposals	T	Tackles
B	Behinds	H	Handballs	M	Marks

Season	Team	No.	Games	Totals							Averages (per game)						
Season	Team	No.	Games	G	B	K	H	D	M	T	G	B	K	H	D	M	T
2009	Fremantle	48	15	2	2	153	191	344	95	47	0.1	0.1	10.2	12.7	22.9	6.3	3.1
2010	Fremantle	6	17	2	0	210	203	413	95	57	0.1	0.0	12.4	11.9	24.3	5.6	3.4
2011	Fremantle	6	21	5	5	246	213	459	86	84	0.2	0.2	11.7	10.1	21.9	4.1	4.0
2012	Fremantle	6	15	6	3	129	141	270	62	79	0.4	0.2	8.6	9.4	18.0	4.1	5.3
2013	Gold Coast	36	17	2	0	145	152	297	68	47	0.1	0.0	8.5	8.9	17.5	4.0	2.8
2014	Gold Coast	36	20	2	4	154	195	349	84	73	0.1	0.2	7.7	9.8	17.5	4.2	3.7
2015	Gold Coast	36	5	0	0	16	33	49	9	10	0.0	0.0	3.2	6.6	9.8	1.8	2.0
Career			110	19	14	1053	1128	2181	499	397	0.2	0.1	9.6	10.3	19.8	4.5	3.6
