= Ben Bucovaz =

Australian rules footballer

Personal information
- Full name: Ben Bucovaz
- Born: 2 November 1990 (age 36)
- Original team: Geelong Falcons (TAC Cup)
- Draft: No. 56, 2008 National Draft, Fremantle
- Height: 188 cm (6 ft 2 in)
- Weight: 88 kg (194 lb)
- Position: Forward / Defender

Playing career^{1}
Years	Club	Games (Goals)
2011	Fremantle	2 (0)
- ^{1} Playing statistics correct to the end of 2011.

Ben Bucovaz (born 2 November 1990) is a former professional Australian rules footballer who played for the Fremantle Football Club in the Australian Football League (AFL).

He was selected with the 56th selection in the 2008 AFL National Draft. Bucovaz was a member of Victoria Country's National Under-18s Championships side and played for the Geelong Amateur Football Club in the Bellarine Football League and the Geelong Falcons in the TAC Cup.

Since moving to Western Australia, he mainly played for East Fremantle in the WAFL. At the end of the 2010 season he was delisted, but he was then re-drafted by Fremantle in the 2011 Rookie Draft. He was upgraded to the senior list when Viv Michie was placed on the long-term injury list in June 2011. Bucovaz made his AFL debut in Fremantle's loss to Melbourne at the Melbourne Cricket Ground in Round 13 of the 2011 AFL season.
