= Dwayne Simpson =

Australian rules footballer

Personal information
- Born: 12 February 1981 (age 45)
- Original team: East Fremantle (WAFL)
- Debut: Round 20, 2001, Fremantle vs. Brisbane Lions, at Subiaco Oval

Playing career^{1}
Years	Club	Games (Goals)
2001	Fremantle	2 (1)
- ^{1} Playing statistics correct to the end of 2001.

Dwayne Simpson (born 12 February 1981) is a former Australian rules footballer who played for the Fremantle Dockers in 2001. He was originally drafted by the Sydney Swans from East Fremantle in the WAFL with selection 59 in the 1998 AFL draft but did not play a league game for them. At the end of the 2000 season he was traded back to West Australia in return for the 52nd selection. He played two games for Fremantle in 2001 before being delisted at the end of the season.

Originally from Mullewa in the Mid West region of Western Australia, he is the nephew of actor Ernie Dingo.
