= Tobe Watson =

Australian rules football player (born 1997)

Personal information
- Full name: Tobe Watson
- Born: 3 December 1997 (age 28)
- Original team: Swan Districts (WAFL)
- Draft: No. 22, 2019 rookie draft
- Height: 190 cm (6 ft 3 in)
- Weight: 83 kg (183 lb)
- Position: Defender

Playing career^{1}
Years	Club	Games (Goals)
2019–2021	Fremantle	14 (1)
- ^{1} Playing statistics correct to the end of 2021.

Tobe Watson (born 3 December 1997) is an Australian rules footballer who plays for the Port Melbourne Football Club in the Victorian Football League (VFL). He previously played for Fremantle in the Australian Football League (AFL).

Originally from Donnybrook in the South West region of Western Australia, Watson attended Guildford Grammar School. He then played for Swan Districts in the West Australian Football League (WAFL).

Drafted with the 22nd selection in the 2019 rookie draft, Watson played the entire 2019 season for Peel Thunder before making his AFL debut for Fremantle in round 8 of the 2020 AFL season as a late replacement for Brennan Cox.

In August 2021 Watson was informed that he would not be offered a contract extension for 2022.
