= Garth Taylor =

Australian rules footballer (born 1980)

Personal information
- Born: 10 July 1980 (age 46); Kellerberrin, Western Australia
- Original team: Swan Districts (WAFL)
- Debut: Round 1, 1999, Fremantle vs. West Coast, at Subiaco

Playing career^{1}
Years	Club	Games (Goals)
1999–2000	Fremantle	15 (12)
2001–2002	Richmond	0 (0)
Total		15 (12)
- ^{1} Playing statistics correct to the end of 2002.

Career highlights
- Larke Medal 1998

Garth Taylor (born 10 July 1980) is an Australian rules footballer who played for the Fremantle Dockers between 1999 and 2000. He was drafted from Swan Districts in the WAFL as the 49th selection in the 1998 AFL draft and played mainly as a forward.

One of the smallest players to ever play AFL football at 166 cm, he had an impressive junior career including winning the Larke Medal for the best player at the national under 18 championships in 1998. Taylor struggled to perform consistently at AFL level due to a kidney injury. His senior personal highlight was receiving three Brownlow Medal votes in only his sixth game for Fremantle in Round 7, 1999 against Geelong as an 18 year old. He would play 14 games in 1999, but no more until the final Round 22 game in 2000, after which he was de-listed.

Richmond Football Club selected him in the 2001 Rookie Draft, but he never played a league game for the Tigers. He was de-listed by Richmond, where his AFL career was cut short but remained in Victoria to play for the Northern Bullants in the Victorian Football League where he excelled, until returning back home to Western Australia in 2005 to play for Swan Districts.

In 2016, the Nungarin Panthers in the Central Wheatbelt Football League signed Taylor as their coach and captain.

In 2023, he was signed as the Beacon Bombers football coach.
