= Michael Warren (footballer) =

Australian rules footballer, born 1982

Personal information
- Full name: Michael Armstrong Warren
- Born: 20 March 1982 (age 44)
- Original teams: Claremont, WAFL
- Height: 195 cm (6 ft 5 in)
- Weight: 96 kg (212 lb)
- Position: Ruckman

Playing career^{1}
Years	Club	Games (Goals)
2006	Fremantle	1 (0)
- ^{1} Playing statistics correct to the end of 2008.

Michael Armstrong Warren (born 20 March 1982) is an Australian rules footballer who plays for Claremont in the West Australian Football League and once played for Fremantle in the Australian Football League. He plays as a ruckman or key defender.

Warren, originally from South Bunbury, made his debut for Claremont in 2003. He was then selected by Fremantle with the 41st selection in the 2004 Rookie Draft and was elevated to the senior list at the end of the 2005 AFL season. He made his AFL debut against Melbourne at the MCG in Round 7, 2006 when injuries forced first-choice ruckmen Aaron Sandilands and Justin Longmuir to miss the game. He was delisted by Fremantle at the end of the 2006 AFL season without playing another game but continued to play for Claremont in the WAFL. He was a member of Claremont's 2004, 2005 and 2007 WAFL Grand Final teams, but lost all three, twice to Subiaco and once to South Fremantle. He switched to play for East Fremantle in 2010.
