= Jamie Merillo =

Australian rules footballer

Personal information
- Full name: Jamie Craige Merillo
- Born: 27 November 1972 (age 53)
- Original team: Claremont (WAFL)
- Debut: Round 1, 1995, Fremantle vs. Richmond, at the MCG

Playing career^{1}
Years	Club	Games (Goals)
1995–1997	Fremantle	15 (2)
- ^{1} Playing statistics correct to the end of 1997.

Jamie Craige Merillo (born 27 November 1972) is an Australian rules footballer who played for the Fremantle Dockers between 1995 and 1997. He was drafted from Claremont in the WAFL as a foundation selection in the 1994 AFL draft and played mainly as a rover.

Merillo broke his jaw in Fremantle's inaugural AFL match in 1995, but still managed to play 11 games that year. After only 4 more game in the next two seasons, he was delisted at the end of the 1997 season.

He was also a swimmer who competed in the backstroke finals of the Australian team qualifying trials for the Barcelona Olympics.
