= Steven Koops =

Australian rules footballer

Personal information
- Full name: Steven Koops
- Born: 24 July 1978 (age 48)
- Original teams: Southern Districts, NTFL; West Perth (WAFL)
- Draft: Fremantle: Zone Selection, 1995; Western Bulldogs: Traded for pick 19, 2003
- Height: 187 cm (6 ft 2 in)
- Weight: 83 kg (183 lb)
- Position: Half-forward flank/Half-back flank

Playing career^{1}
Years	Club	Games (Goals)
1996–2003	Fremantle	78 (49)
2004–2005	Western Bulldogs	11 (0)
Total		89 (49)
- ^{1} Playing statistics correct to the end of 2005.

Career highlights
- West Perth premiership side 1999, 2003

Steven John Koops (born 24 July 1978) is a former professional Australian rules footballer, who played for the Fremantle Football Club and Western Bulldogs in the Australian Football League (AFL).

== Early life ==
Originally from the Darwin based Southern Districts Football Club in the NTFL, Koops was drafted from the West Perth Football Club in the WAFL. He represented the Northern Territory at the 1994 and 1996 Under 18 Championships and won the Hunter Harrison Medal in 1995 as the best player in Division 2.

== AFL career ==
In his first four seasons at Fremantle he only played 16 games and in total only played 78 games in eight seasons before being traded to the Western Bulldogs for pick 19 in the 2003 draft. He made his debut in Round 5 of the 1996 AFL season at the age of 17 years and 277 days, the youngest ever to debut for Fremantle.

In 1999 he suffered a knee injury and was drug tested the day after surgery, returning a positive test for pethidine, a banned substance. Upon advice from the club, he pleaded guilty to the charge, but no penalty was imposed. However, due to the guilty finding, his name was entered onto the Australian Sports Drug Agency register, even after the AFL overturned the guilty finding and cleared Koops' name. Fremantle Football Club was fined $5000 for not notifying the AFL of the operation.

His first year at the Bulldogs continued his injury woes, with a thigh strain, broken jaw and punctured lung restricting him to just 11 games in 2004. Shoulder injuries and family reasons forced him to retire in 2005 at only 26 years of age, managing a total of only 89 AFL games over 10 seasons.
