= Ryley Dunn =

Australian rules footballer (born 1985)

Personal information
- Born: 7 October 1985 (age 41)
- Original team: Murray Bushrangers (TAC Cup)
- Debut: Round 1, 2004, Fremantle vs. Carlton, at Subiaco Oval
- Height: 182 cm (6 ft 0 in)
- Weight: 86 kg (190 lb)

Playing career^{1}
Years	Club	Games (Goals)
2004–2008	Fremantle	8 (0)
- ^{1} Playing statistics correct to the end of 2008.

Ryley Dunn (born 7 October 1985) is a former midfielder or defender for the Fremantle Football Club. He was drafted to Fremantle in the 2003 AFL draft at selection 10, which was traded by Hawthorn Football Club in return for Trent Croad. As a junior, he played for the Murray Bushrangers in country Victoria and was twice named All-Australian at under-18 level.

== Career ==
Dunn immediately made his debut in Round 1 2004 against Carlton. However he only played 1 more game for the year due to collarbone, knee and hamstring injuries. 2005 wasn't any more productive, with only a further 2 AFL games. Despite the many injuries, in mid-2005 he extended his contract with Fremantle to the end of the 2008 season.

When not selected for Fremantle or injured, Dunn played for the East Fremantle Football Club in the WAFL.

Ryley was delisted by Fremantle on 22 October 2007, but redrafted onto the Fremantle rookie list in November to fulfil the final year of his contract. Midway through the year, he was elevated onto the senior list and played three games. However, Dunn was once again delisted at the end of the 2008 season. In total he managed only eight games for Fremantle over five seasons but played more than 50 for East Fremantle and continued to play for the club in 2009.
