= Todd Ridley =

Australian rules footballer

Personal information
- Born: 11 February 1969 (age 57)
- Original team: Claremont (WAFL)

Playing career^{1}
Years	Club	Games (Goals)
1991–1994	Essendon	25 (21)
1995–1996	Fremantle	21 (16)
1997	Hawthorn	2 (0)
Total		48 (37)
- ^{1} Playing statistics correct to the end of 1997.

Todd Ridley (born 11 February 1969) is a former Australian rules footballer. He played mainly as a full forward. He is notable for kicking Fremantle Football Club's first goal in the AFL.

== AFL career ==
During his seven years in the Australian Football League he played for three clubs, Essendon, Fremantle and Hawthorn. Injuries restricted him to only 48 games in this time. He played in Fremantle's inaugural game in the AFL on 1 April 1995 vs Richmond at the MCG and scored the team's first ever goal.

After he retired from the AFL he returned to the WAFL, but instead of returning to Claremont, where he had won the Simpson Medal in the Tigers' 1996 premiership, he instead switched to Subiaco. He won the Bernie Naylor Medal in 1998, his first year at Subiaco for kicking the most goals in the league.

He has also been a commentator for the ABC for WAFL games.
