= Steven Dodd =

Australian rules footballer

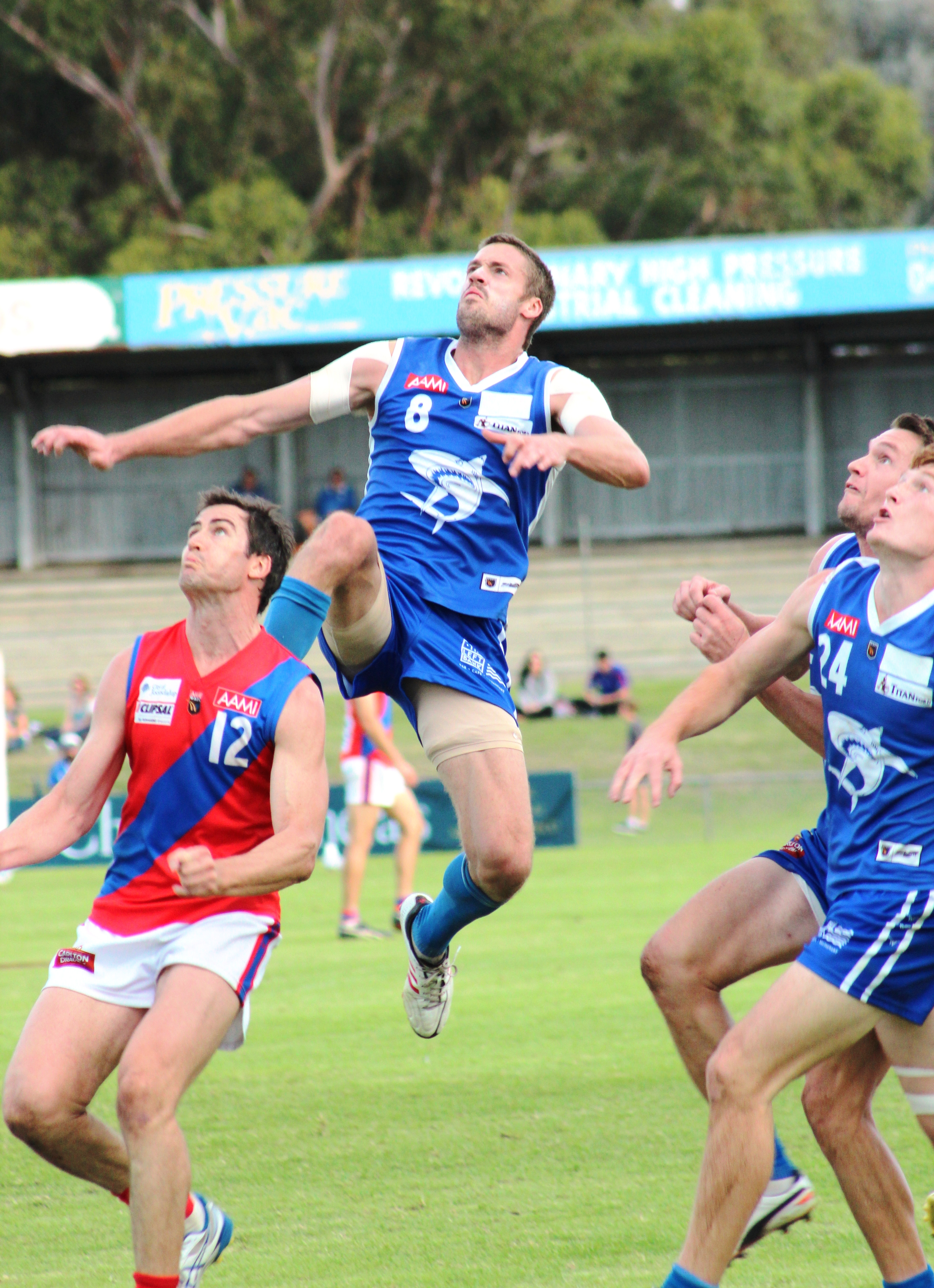
- Dodd vs West Perth at East Fremantle Oval in 2013

Personal information
- Full name: Steven Lloyd Dodd
- Born: 20 June 1983 (age 43)
- Original team: East Fremantle (WAFL)
- Debut: Round 20, 2004, Fremantle vs. Geelong, at Skilled Stadium
- Height: 191 cm (6 ft 3 in)
- Weight: 82 kg (181 lb)

Playing career^{1}
Years	Club	Games (Goals)
2004–2010	Fremantle	101 (7)
- ^{1} Playing statistics correct to the end of 2010.

Steven Lloyd Dodd (born 20 June 1983) is a former Australian rules footballer who primarily played as a backman for the Fremantle Football Club in the Australian Football League.

He was drafted with the 51st selection in the 2003 AFL Rookie Draft whilst playing with East Fremantle. After being elevated from the rookie list for the 2004 season, he made his AFL debut against Geelong in Round 20 of 2004, when Fremantle were defeated by Geelong by 50 points on one of the coldest days of football in recent times. He was reported for engaging in a melee and was fined $1500.

He originally played as a key defender, but later moved into a midfield tagging role.

In October 2010, Dodd was delisted by Fremantle after 101 games over seven seasons with the Dockers. He is the cousin of former Fremantle player Brad Dodd.

After being de-listed by Fremantle, Dodd returned to his former club East Fremantle where he played until retiring at the end of the 2014 season. He played a total of 119 league games for East Fremantle as well as 3 State games for Western Australia. In 2012 he won the club fairest and Best award, the Lynn Medal
