= Daniel Gilmore =

Australian rules footballer, born 1983

Personal information
- Born: 2 March 1983 (age 43)
- Original team: South Fremantle WAFL
- Debut: Round 1, 2004, Fremantle vs. Carlton, at Subiaco Oval
- Height: 191 cm (6 ft 3 in)
- Weight: 91 kg (201 lb)

Playing career^{1}
Years	Club	Games (Goals)
2004–2009	Fremantle	43 (9)
- ^{1} Playing statistics correct to the end of 2009.

Daniel Gilmore (born 2 March 1983) is a former Australian rules footballer for the Fremantle Dockers in the Australian Football League.

After playing nine games in 2004, he had a frustrating 2005, only playing two games and appearing emergency nine times. After playing mainly as a defender or wingman, in 2006 he was tried as a reserve ruckman due to injuries to regular ruckmen Aaron Sandilands and Justin Longmuir. At 91 kg and 191 cm tall he is much shorter than most other ruckmen and has to rely on his leap, speed and endurance to compete.

In 2007, he continued to play as a ruckman because of long term injuries to Longmuir and Sandilands, and towards the end of the season produced some of his best football, gaining more than 20 disposals in 4 consecutive games, including a career high 31 against Essendon in round 19.

When not playing for Fremantle, Gilmore played for South Fremantle in the WAFL and in 2005 was a member of their premiership side and finished in the top 10 for the Sandover Medal. At the end of the 2009 season Gilmore was delisted from Fremantle and retired from all football to concentrate on becoming a chiropractor after winning his second WAFL premiership with South Fremantle.

Gilmore was the head coach of the Sydney University Australian National Football Club (SUANFC) in the North East Australian Football League (NEAFL) between 2013 and 2016.

He is the grandson of Brian Gilmore, a member of Footscray's 1954 premiership team.
