= Brad Wira =

Australian rules footballer (born 1972)

Personal information
- Born: 16 March 1972 (age 54)
- Original team: Claremont (WAFL) / North Albany
- Debut: Round 12, 1995, Fremantle vs. Adelaide, at Football Park

Playing career^{1}
Years	Club	Games (Goals)
1995	Fremantle	1 (0)
1996–1998	Western Bulldogs	61 (4)
1999–2001	Fremantle	34 (14)
Total		96 (18)
- ^{1} Playing statistics correct to the end of 2001.

Brad Wira (born 16 March 1972) was an Australian rules footballer. He played for both the Fremantle Football Club and the Western Bulldogs. He was originally drafted from Claremont in the WAFL as a foundation selection as part of Fremantle's entry to the AFL and played mainly as a defender.

After only playing a single game in Fremantle's inaugural year, Wira was traded to Footscray where he was much more successful, playing in 21 of the 22 rounds in 1996. He would play a further 40 games for the Bulldogs over the next two seasons, before he was traded back to Fremantle for the 1999 season.
