= Brad Rowe (footballer) =

Australian rules footballer, born 1969

Personal information
- Full name: Bradley John Rowe
- Born: 23 November 1969 (age 56); Kalgoorlie
- Original team: East Fremantle (WAFL)

Playing career^{1}
| Years | Club | Games (Goals) |
| 1990–1991 | Brisbane Bears | 14 (9) |
| 1992–1995 | Collingwood | 51 (64) |
| 1996 | Fremantle | 8 (7) |
| Total | | 73 (80) |
- ^{1} Playing statistics correct to the end of 1996.

Career highlights
- Brisbane Bears reserves premiership 1991

Bradley John Rowe (born 23 November 1969) is a former Australian rules footballer who played in the Australian Football League (AFL). He played 72 games in total for three clubs, and kicked 80 goals.

Recruited from East Fremantle, Rowe was drafted by Brisbane as a first-round draft pick in the 1989 National Draft, no.5 overall. He played two seasons for only 14 games at the Bears before being traded to Collingwood. Rowe spent his best seasons of his career at the Pies between 1992 and 1995, as a quick goal-kicking small forward. He was accurate in front of goals, but consistency was his main problem in his later seasons. He kicked goals occasionally, including a bag of 6 goals one day at Victoria Park against Sydney. He then moved back to Perth where he played for Fremantle for one season in 1996, playing only 7 games.

Rowe's mother, Margaret Rowe, was a member of parliament in Western Australia.
