= Mount Isa (locality), Queensland =

Locality in Queensland, Australia

Mount Isa (locality)
- Town
- Interactive map of Mount Isa (locality)
- Coordinates: 20.7256°S 139.4705°E
- Country: Australia
- State: Queensland
- LGA: City of Mount Isa
- Location: 926 km (575 mi) W of Townsville; 1,847 km (1,148 mi) NW of Brisbane

Government
  - State electorate: Traeger
  - Federal division: Kennedy

Area
  - Total: 7,065.9 km^{2} (2,728.2 sq mi)

Population
  - Total: 172 (2021 census)
  - Density: 0.02434/km^{2} (0.06305/sq mi)
- Time zone: UTC+10:00 (AEST)
- Postcode: 4825
Localities around Mount Isa (locality)
Barkly	Gunpowder	Three Rivers
Barkly	Mount Isa (locality)	Cloncurry
Barkly	Waverley	Duchess

Mount Isa is a rural locality in the City of Mount Isa, Queensland, Australia. It is the land that surrounds (and excludes) the suburbs of the town of Mount Isa. In the 2021 census, the locality of Mount Isa had a population of 172 people.

== Geography ==
The shape of the locality can be loosely be described as a doughnut (torus) where the "hole" is the excluded urban area of Mount Isa, consisting of the suburbs (from north to south): Kalkadoon, Lanskey, Ryan, Soldiers Hill, Winston, Sunset, Menzies, Pioneer, Miles End, Fisher, The Gap, Mount Isa City, Breakaway, Townview, Parkside, Mornington, Healy, Happy Valley, Mica Creek and Spreadborough.

The Mount Isa Mines facility is in the locality immediately west of the suburbs (from north to south): Kalkdoon, Soldiers Hill, Miles End, Parkside, Happy Valley and Mica Creek.

The suburbs are separated from the mine facility by the Mount Isa railway line with the Mount Isa railway station in Station Street, Miles End (20.7265°S 139.4847°E), almost on the boundary between that suburb and the Mount Isa locality and the mine facility. The railway line exits the urban area at Mica Creek. Although the line is heading to Cloncurry to the east, the line travels south and exits the locality via Waverley, and then passes through Duchess and Kuridala. This indirect route is to avoid the Mount Godwin Range.

The Barkly Highway enter the locality from the west (Cloncurry), passes through the Mount Godwin Range and enters the urban area at Breakway. It exits the urban area at Kalkadoon and continues north, exiting the locality at Gunpowder. The Mount Isa Duchess Road exits the urban area at Spreadborough and travels south-east exiting the locality at Duchess. The Boulia Mount Isa Highway commences just west of Mica Creek and travels south exiting the locality at Waverley.

== History ==
The locality takes its name from the city, the name of which was suggested by prospector John Campbell Miles who established the first mineral lease in the area in February 1923. It is thought to be a corruption of Mount Ida, the mining town in Western Australia.

== Demographics ==
In the 2016 census, the locality of Mount Isa had a population of 118 people.

In the 2021 census, the locality of Mount Isa had a population of 172 people.

== Education ==
There are no schools in the locality of Mount Isa, but there are numerous primary and secondary schools within the suburbs of Mount Isa. However, all of those schools may be too distant from some parts of the locality of Mount Isa. The alternatives are distance education and boarding school.
