= Spreadborough, Queensland =

Spreadborough
- Suburb
- Interactive map of Spreadborough
- Coordinates: 20.7646°S 139.4967°E
- Country: Australia
- State: Queensland
- LGA: City of Mount Isa
- Location: 4.3 km (2.7 mi) S of Mount Isa CBD; 907 km (564 mi) W of Townsville; 1,829 km (1,136 mi) NW of Brisbane

Government
  - State electorate: Traeger
  - Federal division: Kennedy

Area
  - Total: 1.7 km^{2} (0.66 sq mi)

Population
  - Total: 55 (2021 census)
  - Density: 32.4/km^{2} (84/sq mi)
- Time zone: UTC+10:00 (AEST)
- Postcode: 4825
Suburbs around Spreadborough
| Mica Creek | Healy | Fisher |
| Mica Creek | Spreadborough | Fisher |
| Mount Isa (locality) | Mount Isa (locality) | Mount Isa (locality) |

Spreadborough is a suburb of the town of Mount Isa in the City of Mount Isa, Queensland, Australia. In the 2021 census, Spreadborough had a population of 55 people.

== Geography ==
The Leichhardt River flows north–south through the town of Mount Isa, dividing the suburbs of the town into "mineside" (west of the Leichhardt River) and "townside" (east of the Leichhardt River). Spreadborough is a "townside" suburb.

== History ==
Spreadborough was named on 1 September 1973 by the Queensland Place Names Board after the family who owned the land. On 16 March 2001, the status of Spreadborough was changed from a locality to a suburb.

== Demographics ==
In the 2016 census, Spreadborough had a population of 20 people.

In the 2021 census, Spreadborough had a population of 55 people.

== Education ==
There are no schools in Spreadborough. The nearest government primary school is Happy Valley State School in Happy Valley to the north-west. The nearest government secondary school is Spinifex State College which has its junior campus in Parkside to the north-west and its senior campus in Pioneer to the north-east.
