= Breakaway, Queensland =

Breakaway
- Suburb
- Interactive map of Breakaway
- Coordinates: 20.7246°S 139.5314°E
- Country: Australia
- State: Queensland
- City: Mount Isa
- LGA: City of Mount Isa
- Location: 4.4 km (2.7 mi) E of Mount Isa CBD; 902 km (560 mi) W of Townsville; 1,824 km (1,133 mi) NW of Brisbane

Government
  - State electorate: Traeger
  - Federal division: Kennedy

Area
  - Total: 1.0 km^{2} (0.39 sq mi)

Population
  - Total: 187 (2021 census)
  - Density: 187/km^{2} (484/sq mi)
- Time zone: UTC+10:00 (AEST)
- Postcode: 4825
Suburbs around Breakaway
Fisher	Mount Isa (locality)	Mount Isa (locality)
Fisher	Breakaway	Mount Isa (locality)
Fisher	Fisher	Fisher

Breakaway is a suburb of the town of Mount Isa in the City of Mount Isa, Queensland, Australia. In the 2021 census, Breakaway had a population of 187 people.

== Geography ==
The Leichhardt River flows north–south through the town of Mount Isa, dividing the suburbs of the town into "mineside" (west of the Leichhardt River) and "townside" (east of the Leichhardt River). Breakaway is a "townside" suburb.

== History ==
Breakaway was named on 1 September 1973 by the Queensland Place Names Board after Breakaway Creek which flows past it. On 16 March 2001, the status of Breakaway was changed from a locality to a suburb.

== Demographics ==
In the 2016 census, Breakaway had a population of 199 people.

In the 2021 census, Breakaway had a population of 187 people.

== Education ==
There are no schools in Breakaway. The nearest government primary school is Townview State School in Townview to the south-west. The nearest government secondary school is Spinifex State College, which has its junior campus at Parkside to the south-west and its senior campus in Pioneer to the north-west.
