= Lanskey, Queensland =

Lanskey
- Suburb
- Interactive map of Lanskey
- Coordinates: 20.6884°S 139.4984°E
- Country: Australia
- State: Queensland
- LGA: City of Mount Isa
- Location: 5.2 km (3.2 mi) NNE of Mount Isa CBD; 908 km (564 mi) W of Townsville; 1,829 km (1,136 mi) NW of Brisbane

Government
  - State electorate: Traeger
  - Federal division: Kennedy

Area
  - Total: 1.0 km^{2} (0.39 sq mi)

Population
  - Total: 101 (2021 census)
  - Density: 101/km^{2} (262/sq mi)
- Time zone: UTC+10:00 (AEST)
- Postcode: 4825
Suburbs around Lanskey
Kalkadoon	Mount Isa (locality)	Mount Isa (locality)
Kalkadoon	Lanskey	Mount Isa (locality)
Soldiers Hill	Ryan	Ryan

Lanskey is a suburb of the town of Mount Isa in the City of Mount Isa, Queensland, Australia. In the 2021 census, Lanskey had a population of 101 people.

== Geography ==
The Leichhardt River flows north–south through the town of Mount Isa, dividing the suburbs of the town into "mineside" (west of the Leichhardt River) and "townside" (east of the Leichhardt River). Lanskey is a "townside" suburb and it is bounded to the west by the river.

The suburb is on the outer edge of urban development of the town of Mount Isa. There are small pockets of housing and much of land is still used ffor agriculture, specifically for grazing on native vegetation. There is a caravan park in the far north of the locality.

== History ==
Lanskey was named on 1 September 1973 by the Queensland Place Names Board after grazier Mr Lanskey. On 16 March 2001, the status of Lanskey was changed from a locality to a suburb.

== Demographics ==
In the 2016 census, Lanskey had a population of 63 people.

In the 2021 census, Lanskey had a population of 101 people.

== Education ==
There are no schools in Lanskey. The nearest government primary school is Barkly Highway State School in neighbouring Soldiers Hill to the south-west. The nearest government secondary school is Spinifex State College which has its junior campus in Parkside to the south-west and its senior campus in Pioneer to the south-east.
