= Mica Creek, Queensland =

Mica Creek
- Suburb
- Interactive map of Mica Creek
- Coordinates: 20.7643°S 139.4923°E
- Country: Australia
- State: Queensland
- City: Mount Isa
- LGA: City of Mount Isa
- Location: 3.7 km (2.3 mi) S of Mount Isa CBD; 907 km (564 mi) W of Townsville; 1,829 km (1,136 mi) NW of Brisbane

Government
  - State electorate: Traeger
  - Federal division: Kennedy

Area
  - Total: 1.1 km^{2} (0.42 sq mi)

Population
  - Total: 182 (2021 census)
  - Density: 165/km^{2} (429/sq mi)
- Time zone: UTC+10:00 (AEST)
- Postcode: 4825
Suburbs around Mica Creek
Mount Isa (locality)	Happy Valley	Healy
Mount Isa (locality)	Mica Creek	Spreadborough
Mount Isa (locality)	Mount Isa (locality)	Mount Isa (locality)

Mica Creek is a suburb of the town of Mount Isa in the City of Mount Isa, Queensland, Australia. In the 2021 census, Mica Creek had a population of 182 people.

== Geography ==
The Leichhardt River flows north–south through the town of Mount Isa, dividing the suburbs of the town into "mineside" (west of the Leichhardt River) and "townside" (east of the Leichhardt River). Mica Creek is a "mineside" suburb.

== History ==
Mica Creek was named on 1 September 1973 by the Queensland Place Names Board. On 16 March 2001, the status of Mica Creek was changed from a locality to a suburb.

== Demographics ==
In the 2016 census, Mica Creek had a population of 197 people.

In the 2021 census, Mica Creek had a population of 182 people.

== Education ==
There are no schools in Mica Creek. The nearest government primary school is Happy Valley State School in neighbouring Happy Valley to the north. The nearest government secondary school is Spinifex State College which has its junior campus in Parkside to the north and its senior campus in Pioneer to the north-west.

== Facilities ==
Despite the name, the Mica Creek Power Station is not in the suburb but is immediately adjacent to the west in the Mount Isa locality.
