= Ryan, Queensland =

Ryan
- Suburb
- Interactive map of Ryan
- Coordinates: 20.7008°S 139.4997°E
- Country: Australia
- State: Queensland
- LGA: City of Mount Isa
- Location: 3.1 km (1.9 mi) NNE of Mount Isa CBD; 907 km (564 mi) WSW of Townsville; 1,825 km (1,134 mi) NW of Brisbane

Government
  - State electorate: Traeger
  - Federal division: Kennedy

Area
  - Total: 1.6 km^{2} (0.62 sq mi)

Population
  - Total: 105 (2021 census)
  - Density: 65.6/km^{2} (170/sq mi)
- Time zone: UTC+10:00 (AEST)
- Postcode: 4825
Suburbs around Ryan
Lanskey	Mount Isa (locality)	Mount Isa (locality)
Soldiers Hill	Ryan	Mount Isa (locality)
Soldiers Hill	Winston	Sunset

Ryan is a mixed-use suburb of the town of Mount Isa in the City of Mount Isa, Queensland, Australia. In the 2021 census, Ryan had a population of 105 people.

== Geography ==
The Leichhardt River flows north–south through the town of Mount Isa, dividing the suburbs of the town into "mineside" (west of the Leichhardt River) and "townside" (east of the Leichhardt River). Ryan is a "townside" suburb.

There is a residential area in the south-west of the suburb. There are two areas of industrial use, one on the north-west and west of the suburb and the other on the east, south-east, and south of the suburb. Between these two industrial areas there is agriculture, predominantly grazing on native vegetation.

== History ==
All burials occurred in the Pioneer Cemetery (now within Ryan) until the opening of the Sunset Memorial Cemetery in the late 1930s.

Ryan was named on 1 September 1973 by the Queensland Place Names Board after Dr Edward Joseph Ryan, the medical superintendent of the Mount Isa District Hospital during World War II. On 16 March 2001, the status of Ryan was changed from a locality to a suburb.

== Demographics ==
In the 2016 census, Ryan had a population of 141 people.

In the 2021 census, Ryan had a population of 105 people.

== Education ==
There are no schools in Ryan. The nearest government primary schools are Barkly Highway State School in neighbouring Soldiers Hill to the west and Sunset State School in neighbouring Sunset to the south-east. The nearest government secondary school is Spinifex State College which has its junior campus in Parkside to the south-west and its senior campus in Pioneer to the south-east.

== Amenities ==
Edna Medley Park is an off-leash dog park on Sunset Drive (20.70797°S 139.50308°E).

== Facilities ==
Mount Isa Pioneer Cemetery is off Ryan Road (20.6965°S 139.5019°E).

Mount Isa Sunset Memorial Cemetery is at the northern end of Sunset Drive (20.7014°S 139.5067°E).

Mount Isa SES Facility is at 14 Ryan Road (20.7012°S 139.4976°E).
