= Fisher, Queensland =

Fisher
- Suburb
- Interactive map of Fisher
- Coordinates: 20.7466°S 139.5316°E
- Country: Australia
- State: Queensland
- LGA: City of Mount Isa
- Location: 2.6 km (1.6 mi) E of Mount Isa CBD; 901 km (560 mi) W of Townsville; 1,823 km (1,133 mi) NW of Brisbane

Government
  - State electorate: Traeger
  - Federal division: Kennedy

Area
  - Total: 23.0 km^{2} (8.9 sq mi)

Population
  - Total: 65 (2021 census)
  - Density: 2.826/km^{2} (7.32/sq mi)
- Time zone: UTC+10:00 (AEST)
- Postcode: 4825
Suburbs around Fisher
Pioneer	Sunset	Breakaway
Townview; Healy	Fisher	Mount Isa (locality)
Spreadborough	Mount Isa (locality)	Mount Isa (locality)

Fisher is a suburb of the town of Mount Isa in the City of Mount Isa, Queensland, Australia. In the 2021 census, Fisher had a population of 65 people.

== Geography ==
The Leichhardt River flows north–south through the town of Mount Isa, dividing the suburbs of the town into "mineside" (west of the Leichhardt River) and "townside" (east of the Leichhardt River). Fisher is a "townside" suburb.

== History ==
Fisher was named on 1 September 1973 by the Queensland Place Names Board after Sir George Fisher, Chairman of Mount Isa Mines Ltd from 1953 to 1970. On 16 March 2001, the status of Fisher was changed from a locality to a suburb.

== Demographics ==
In the 2016 census, Fisher had "no people or a very low population".

In the 2021 census, Fisher had a population of 65 people.

== Education ==
There are no schools in Fisher. The nearest government primary school is Townview State School in neighbouring Townview to the west. The nearest government secondary is Spinifex State College which has its junior campus in Parkside to the west and its senior campus in neighbouring Pioneer to the north-west.
