= Mornington, Queensland =

Mornington
- Suburb
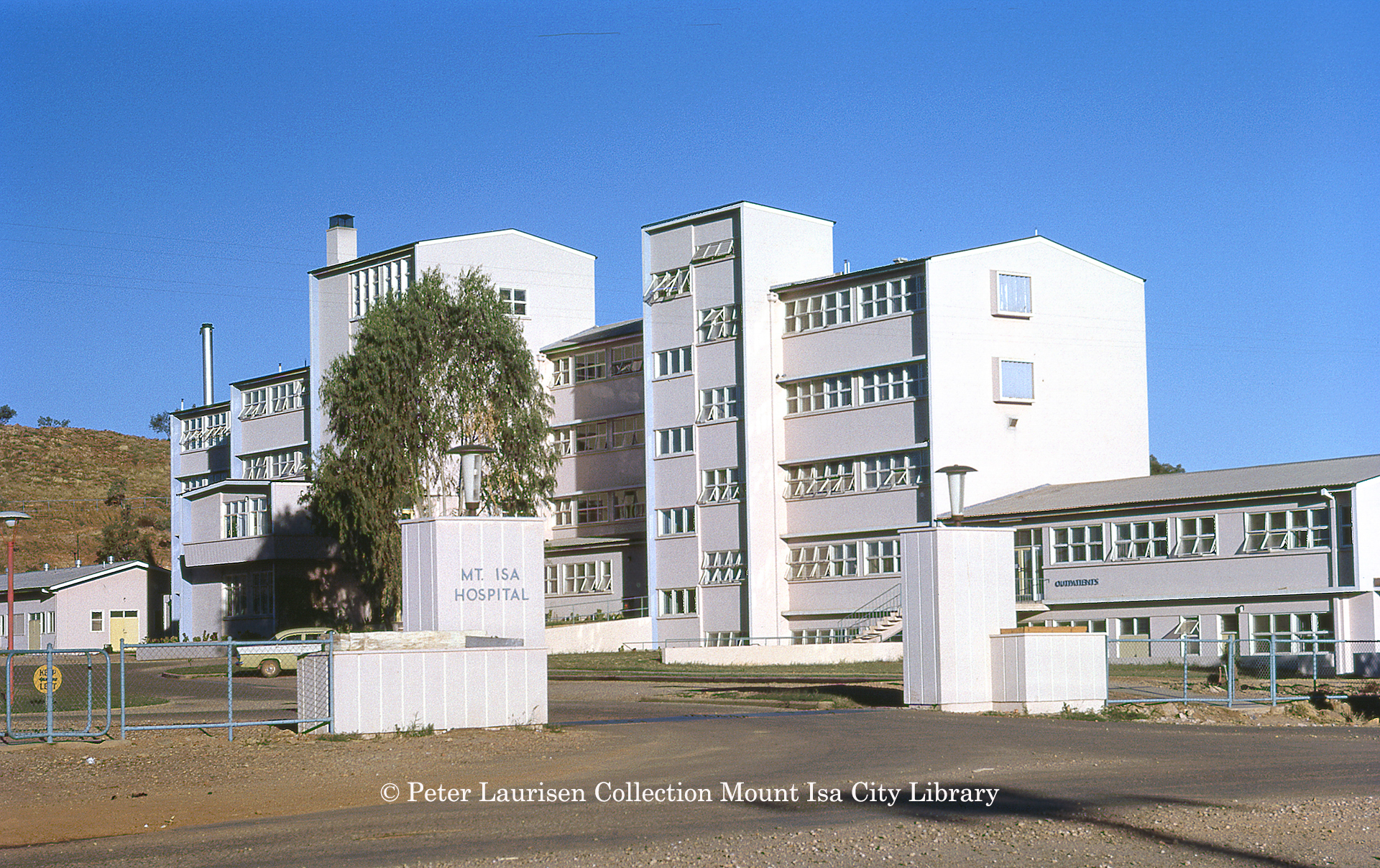
- Mount Isa Base Hospital, June 1962

- Interactive map of Mornington
- Coordinates: 20.7340°S 139.4959°E
- Country: Australia
- State: Queensland
- City: Mount Isa
- LGA: City of Mount Isa
- Location: 1.4 km (0.87 mi) SSE of Mount Isa CBD; 904 km (562 mi) W of Townsville; 1,825 km (1,134 mi) NW of Brisbane

Government
  - State electorate: Traeger
  - Federal division: Kennedy

Area
  - Total: 1.0 km^{2} (0.39 sq mi)

Population
  - Total: 1,846 (2021 census)
  - Density: 1,850/km^{2} (4,780/sq mi)
- Time zone: UTC+10:00 (AEST)
- Postcode: 4825
Suburbs around Mornington
Mount Isa City	The Gap	Townview
Parkside	Mornington	Townview
Parkside	Healy	Healy

Mornington is a suburb of the town of Mount Isa in the City of Mount Isa, Queensland, Australia. In the 2021 census, Mornington had a population of 1,846 people.

== Geography ==
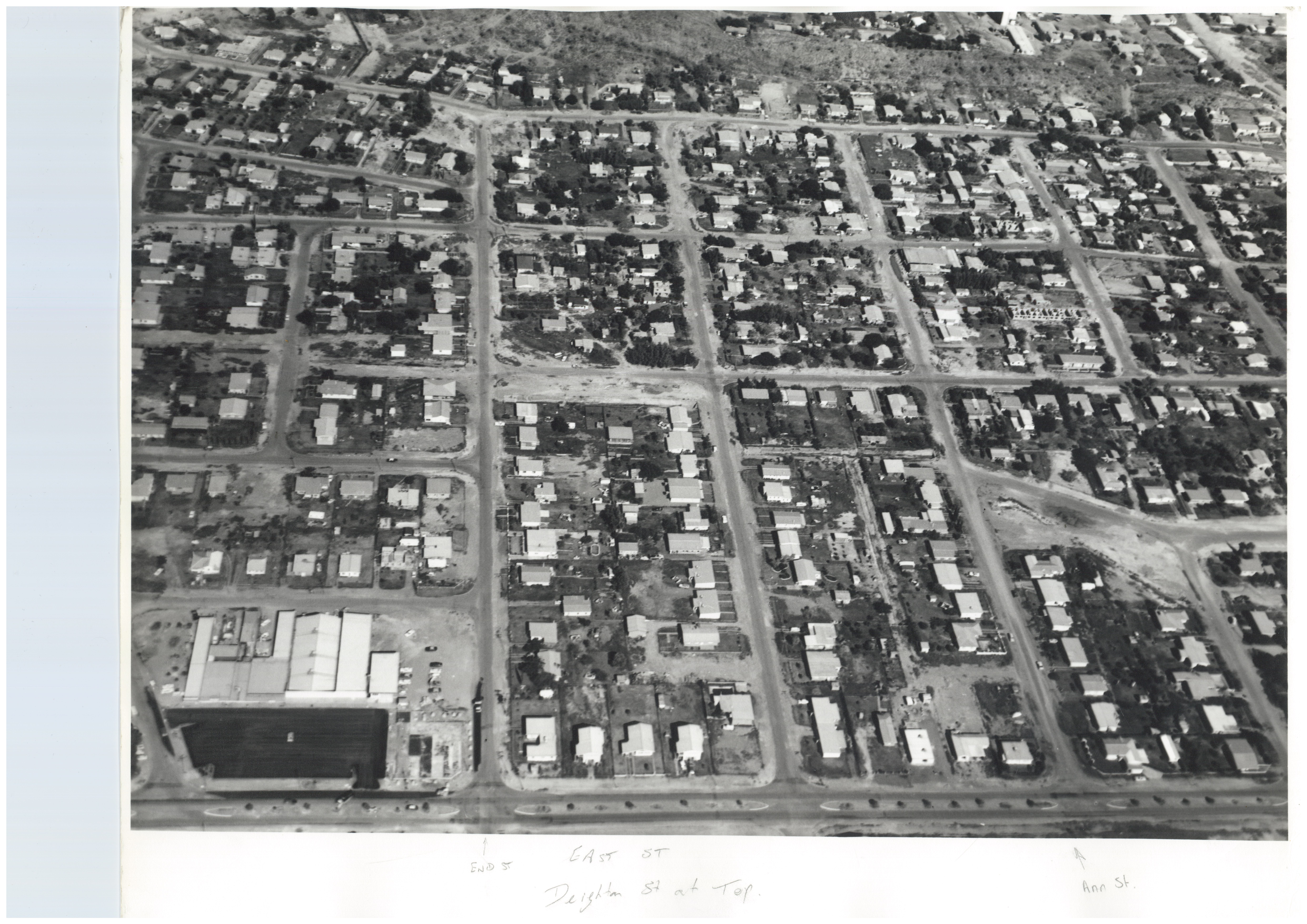
Aerial photo of Mornington, February 1973

The Leichhardt River flows north-south through the town of Mount Isa, dividing the suburbs of the town into "mineside" (west of the Leichhardt River) and "townside" (east of the Leichhardt River). Mornington is a "townside" suburb.

== History ==
Mornington was named on 1 September 1973 by the Queensland Place Names Board. Originally a locality, it became a suburb on 16 March 2001.

== Demographics ==
In the 2011 census, Mornington had a population of 1,919 people.

In the 2016 census, Mornington had a population of 1,764 people.

In the 2021 census, Mornington had a population of 1,846 people.

== Heritage listings ==
Mornington has a number of heritage-listed sites, including:

- Underground Hospital, Camooweal Street (20.7316°S 139.4947°E)
- Tent House, Camooweal Street (20.7325°S 139.4883°E)

== Education ==
There are no schools in Mornington. The nearest government primary schools are Mount Isa Central State School in neighbouring Mount Isa City to the north-west, Townview State School in neighbouring Townview to the east, and Healy State School in neighbouring Healy to the south. The nearest government secondary school is Spinfex State College which has its junior campus in neighbouring Parkside to the west and its senior campus in Pioneer to the north-west.

== Facilities ==
Mount Isa Base Hospital is a public hospital at 30 Camooweal Street (20.7307°S 139.4941°E). It includes the Centre for Rural and Remote Health operated by James Cook University.
