= Winston, Queensland =

Winston
- Suburb
- Interactive map of Winston
- Coordinates: 20.7098°S 139.4975°E
- Country: Australia
- State: Queensland
- City: Mount Isa
- LGA: City of Mount Isa
- Location: 2.0 km (1.2 mi) NNE of Mount Isa CBD; 904 km (562 mi) W of Townsville; 1,826 km (1,135 mi) NW of Brisbane

Government
  - State electorate: Traeger
  - Federal division: Kennedy

Area
  - Total: 0.8 km^{2} (0.31 sq mi)

Population
  - Total: 1,084 (2021 census)
  - Density: 1,360/km^{2} (3,510/sq mi)
- Time zone: UTC+10:00 (AEST)
- Postcode: 4825
Suburbs around Winston
Soldiers Hill	Ryan	Ryan
Soldiers Hill	Winston	Sunset
Soldiers Hill	Menzies	Pioneer

Winston is a suburb of the town of Mount Isa in the City of Mount Isa, Queensland, Australia. In the 2021 census, Winston had a population of 1,084 people.

== Geography ==
The Leichhardt River flows north-south through the town of Mount Isa, dividing the suburbs of the town into "mineside" (west of the Leichhardt River) and "townside" (east of the Leichhardt River). Winston is a "townside" suburb.

== History ==
Winston was named by the Queensland Place Names Board on 1 September 1973. On 16 March 2001, the status of Winston was changed from a locality to a suburb.

== Demographics ==
In the 2016 census, Winston had a population of 1,134 people.

In the 2021 census, Winston had a population of 1,084 people.

== Education ==
There are no schools in Winston. The nearest government primary schools are Sunset State School in neighbouring Sunset to the west and Mount Isa Central State School in the Mount Isa CBD to the south. The nearest government secondary school is Spinifex State College which has its junior campus in Parkside to the south-west and its senior campus in neighbouring Pioneer to the south-east.
