= Sunset, Queensland =

Sunset
- Suburb
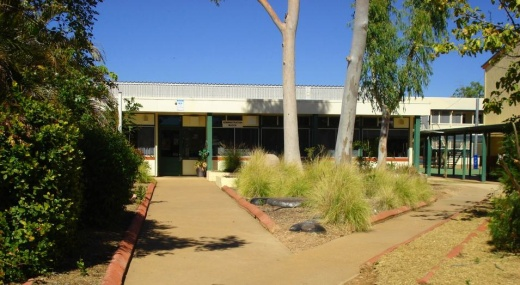
- Sunset State School, 2012

- Interactive map of Sunset
- Coordinates: 20.7113°S 139.5119°E
- Country: Australia
- State: Queensland
- LGA: City of Mount Isa
- Location: 3.1 km (1.9 mi) NE of Mount Isa CBD; 904 km (562 mi) W of Townsville; 1,825 km (1,134 mi) NW of Brisbane

Government
  - State electorate: Traeger
  - Federal division: Kennedy

Area
  - Total: 2.0 km^{2} (0.77 sq mi)

Population
  - Total: 2,137 (2021 census)
  - Density: 1,069/km^{2} (2,770/sq mi)
- Time zone: UTC+10:00 (AEST)
- Postcode: 4825
Suburbs around Sunset
| Ryan | Mount Isa (locality) | Mount Isa (locality) |
| Ryan | Sunset | Mount Isa (locality) |
| Winston | Pioneer | Fisher |

Sunset is a suburb of the town of Mount Isa in the City of Mount Isa, Queensland, Australia. In the 2021 census, Sunset had a population of 2,137 people.

== Geography ==
The Leichhardt River flows north–south through the town of Mount Isa, dividing the suburbs of the town into "mineside" (west of the Leichhardt River) and "townside" (east of the Leichhardt River). Sunset is a "townside" suburb.

Sunset is bounded on the east by Sunset Drive and to the south by an unnamed creek (a tributary of the Leichhardt River). The western part of the suburb is mostly flat (approximately 360 metres above sea level) and is used for residential purposes. To the east of the suburban development, the land rises to two local prominences (420 metres above sea level).

== History ==
The suburb of Sunset is named because it is on the western side of a slope with views of the sunset.

Sunset State School opened on 30 January 1968.

== Demographics ==
In the 2016 census, Sunset had a population of 2,188 people.

In the 2021 census, Sunset had a population of 2,137 people.

== Education ==
Sunset State School is a government primary (Prep-6) school for boys and girls at Abel Smith Parade (20.7089°S 139.5103°E). In 2016, the school had an enrolment of 253 students (of whom 195 identify as Indigenous) with 24 teachers (23 full-time equivalent) and 19 non-teaching staff (14 full-time equivalent). In 2018, the school had an enrolment of 252 students with 25 teachers (24 full-time equivalent) and 12 non-teaching staff (9 full-time equivalent). It includes a special education program.

Mount Isa Flexible Learning Centre is a Catholic secondary (7-12) school for boys and girls at 74 Abel Smith Parade (20.7126°S 139.5107°E). The school provides individual support for students unsuited to mainstream schooling to improve their education and assist them in gaining employment. In 2018, the school had an enrolment of 42 students with 5 teachers (4 full-time equivalent) and 12 non-teaching staff (7 full-time equivalent).

There is no mainstream secondary school in Sunset. The nearest government secondary school is Spinifex State College which has its junior campus in Parkside to the south-west and its senior campus in neighbouring Pioneer to the south.

== Amenities ==
There are a number of parks in the area:

- Bill Macdonald Park (20.7131°S 139.5045°E)
- Charlie Steene Park (20.7196°S 139.5123°E)
- Sunset Park (20.7114°S 139.5103°E)
- Sunset Stadium (20.7042°S 139.5125°E)
