= Kalkadoon, Queensland =

Kalkadoon
- Suburb
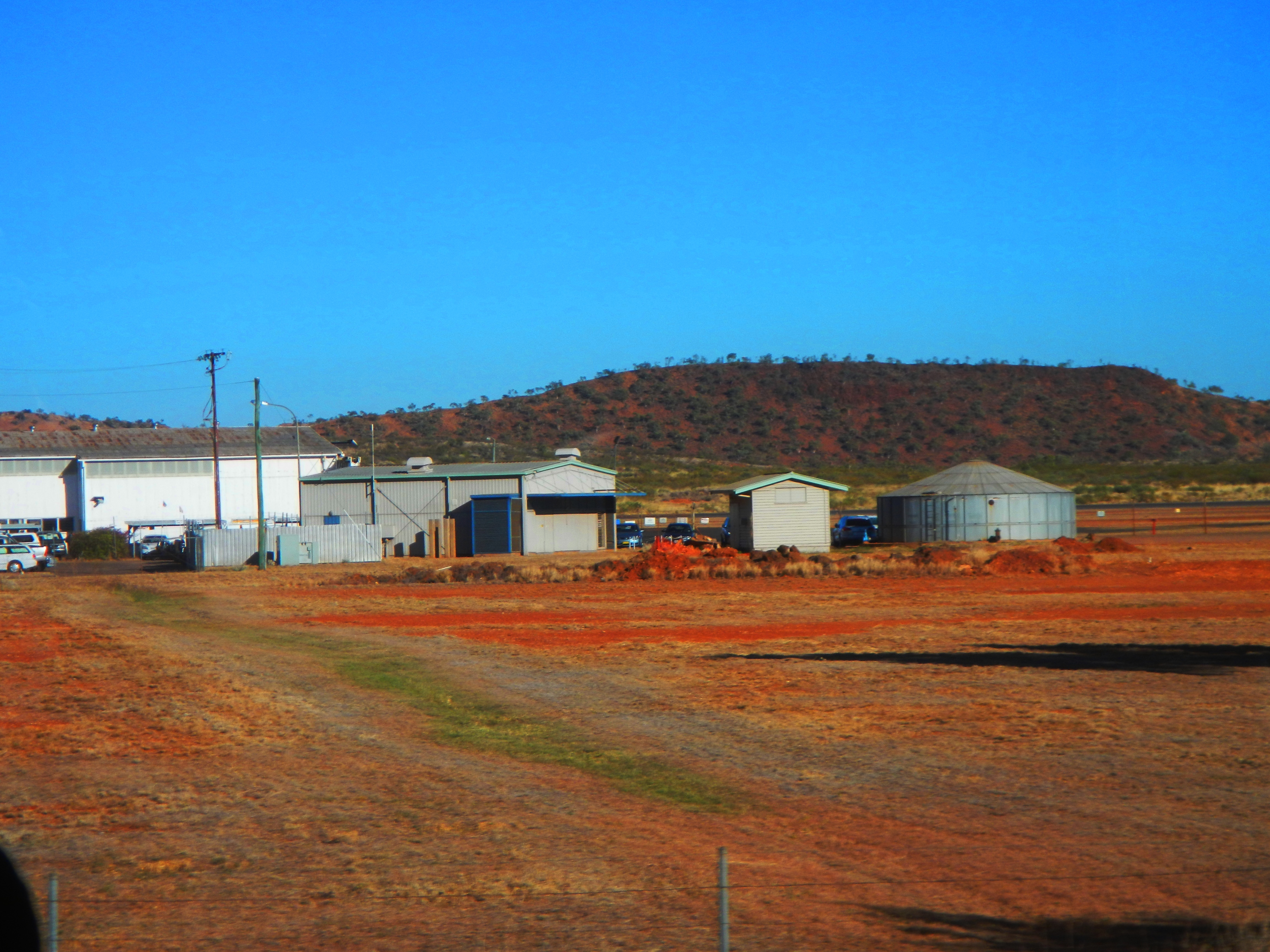
- Mine Logistics Site, 2013

- Interactive map of Kalkadoon
- Coordinates: 20.6726°S 139.4875°E
- Country: Australia
- State: Queensland
- City: Mount Isa
- LGA: City of Mount Isa
- Location: 8.2 km (5.1 mi) N of Mount Isa CBD; 912 km (567 mi) WSW of Townsville; 1,833 km (1,139 mi) NW of Brisbane

Government
  - State electorate: Traeger
  - Federal division: Kennedy

Area
  - Total: 6.5 km^{2} (2.5 sq mi)

Population
  - Total: 27 (2021 census)
  - Density: 4.15/km^{2} (10.76/sq mi)
- Time zone: UTC+10:00 (AEST)
- Postcode: 4825
Suburbs around Kalkadoon
Mount Isa (locality)	Mount Isa (locality)	Mount Isa (locality)
Mount Isa (locality)	Kalkadoon	Mount Isa (locality)
Mount Isa (locality)	Soldiers Hill	Lanskey

Kalkadoon is a suburb of the town of Mount Isa in the City of Mount Isa, Queensland, Australia. In the 2021 census, Kalkadoon had a population of 27 people.

== Geography ==
The Leichhardt River flows north-south through the town of Mount Isa, dividing the suburbs of the town into "mineside" (west of the Leichhardt River) and "townside" (east of the Leichhardt River). Kalkadoon is a "mineside" suburb.

== History ==
Despite the name, the Kalkadoon State High School was in the Mount Isa suburb of Pioneer.

== Demographics ==
In the 2016 census, Kalkadoon had a population of 29 people.

In the 2021 census, Kalkadoon had a population of 27 people.

== Education ==
There are no schools in Kalkadoon. The nearest government primary school is Barkly Highway State School in neighbouring Soldiers Hill to the south. The nearest government secondary school is Spinifex State College which has its junior campus in Parkside to the south and its senior campus in Pioneer to the south-east.
