= Happy Valley, Queensland (Mount Isa) =

Happy Valley
- Suburb
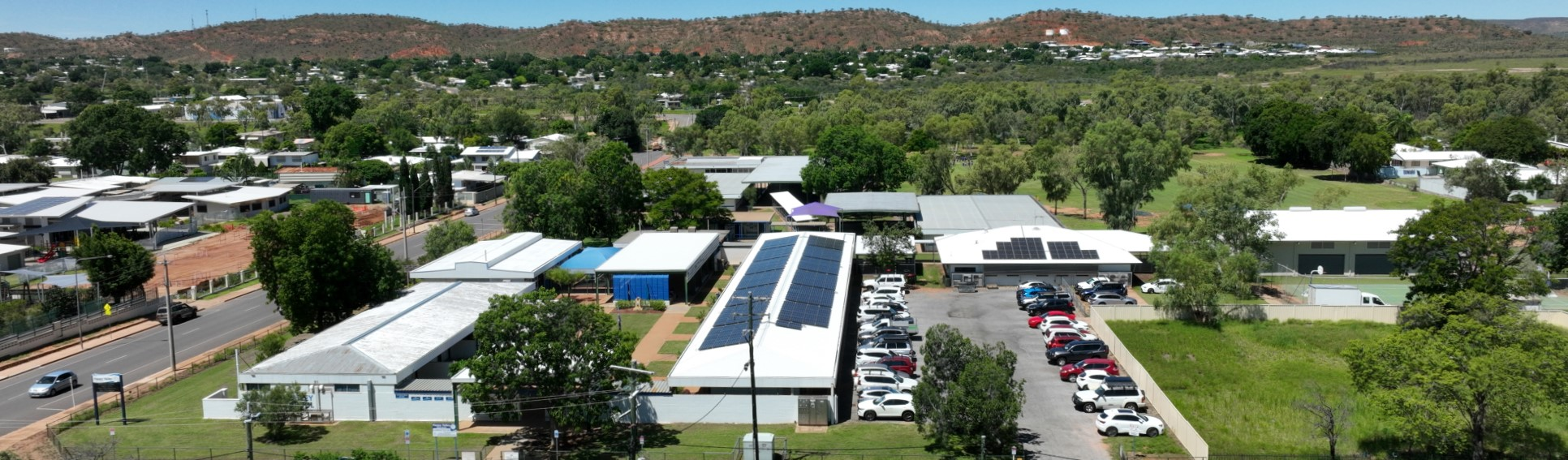
- Happy Valley State School, 2023

- Interactive map of Happy Valley
- Coordinates: 20.7473°S 139.4900°E
- Country: Australia
- State: Queensland
- City: Mount Isa
- LGA: City of Mount Isa
- Location: 2.9 km (1.8 mi) SSW of Mount Isa CBD; 907 km (564 mi) WSW of Townsville; 1,828 km (1,136 mi) NW of Brisbane

Government
  - State electorate: Traeger
  - Federal division: Kennedy

Area
  - Total: 0.6 km^{2} (0.23 sq mi)

Population
  - Total: 733 (2021 census)
  - Density: 1,220/km^{2} (3,160/sq mi)
- Time zone: UTC+10:00 (AEST)
- Postcode: 4825
Suburbs around Happy Valley
Mount Isa (locality)	Parkside	Parkside
Mount Isa (locality)	Happy Valley	Healy
Mount Isa (locality)	Mica Creek	Mica Creek

Happy Valley is a suburb of the town of Mount Isa in the City of Mount Isa, Queensland, Australia. In the 2021 census, Happy Valley had a population of 733 people.

== Geography ==
The Leichhardt River flows north–south through the town of Mount Isa, dividing the suburbs of the town into "mineside" (west of the Leichhardt River) and "townside" (east of the Leichhardt River). Happy Valley is a "mineside" suburb.

Happy Valley is bounded to the west by the Great Northern railway, to the north by Twenty-third Avenue, and to the east roughly by the Leichhardt River.

== History ==
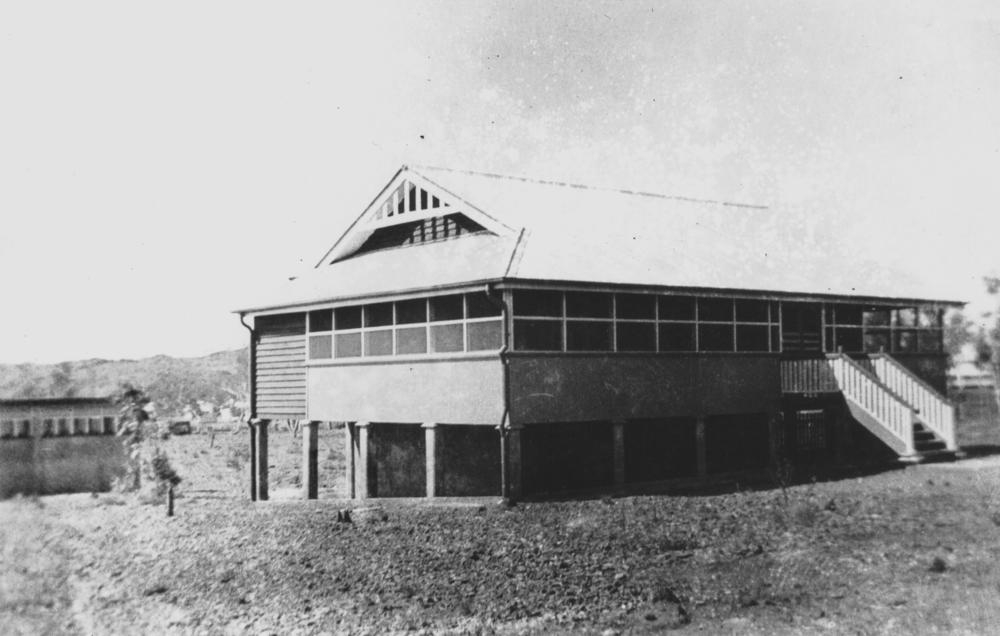
Mount Isa Mines State School, 1930

The suburb was named in September 1973 and is the ironic name given to the area by the population during the Great Depression, when a shanty town existed in the area.

Isa Mines State School opened on 3 May 1932 with 79 students and head-teacher Mr Phail and assistant teacher Miss Bennett. The original school building had 2 rooms with verandahs on the front and one side. By the end of the first month there were 99 students. Rising student numbers necessitated the user of the verandahs as classrooms resulting in the addition of two more schoolrooms and an office in 1933. In 1938 a fifth classroom was added for the primary school with another room for secondary students who were taught by high school teacher Les Jacobs. In 1971 new facilities were built at a new location and the school was renamed Happy Valley State School.

== Demographics ==
In the 2016 census, Happy Valley had a population of 767 people.

In the 2021 census, Happy Valley had a population of 733 people.

== Education ==
Happy Valley State School is a government primary (Prep-6) school for boys and girls at Brilliant Street (20.7449°S 139.4910°E). In 2016, the school had an enrolment of 402 students with 29 teachers (27 full-time equivalent) and 15 non-teaching staff (11 full-time equivalent). In 2018, the school had an enrolment of 384 students with 30 teachers (29 full-time equivalent) and 16 non-teaching staff (10 full-time equivalent).

There is no secondary school in Happy Valley. The nearest government secondary school is Spinifex State College which has its junior campus in neighbouring Parkside to the north and its senior campus in Pioneer to the north-east.
