= The Gap, Queensland (Mount Isa) =

The Gap
- Suburb
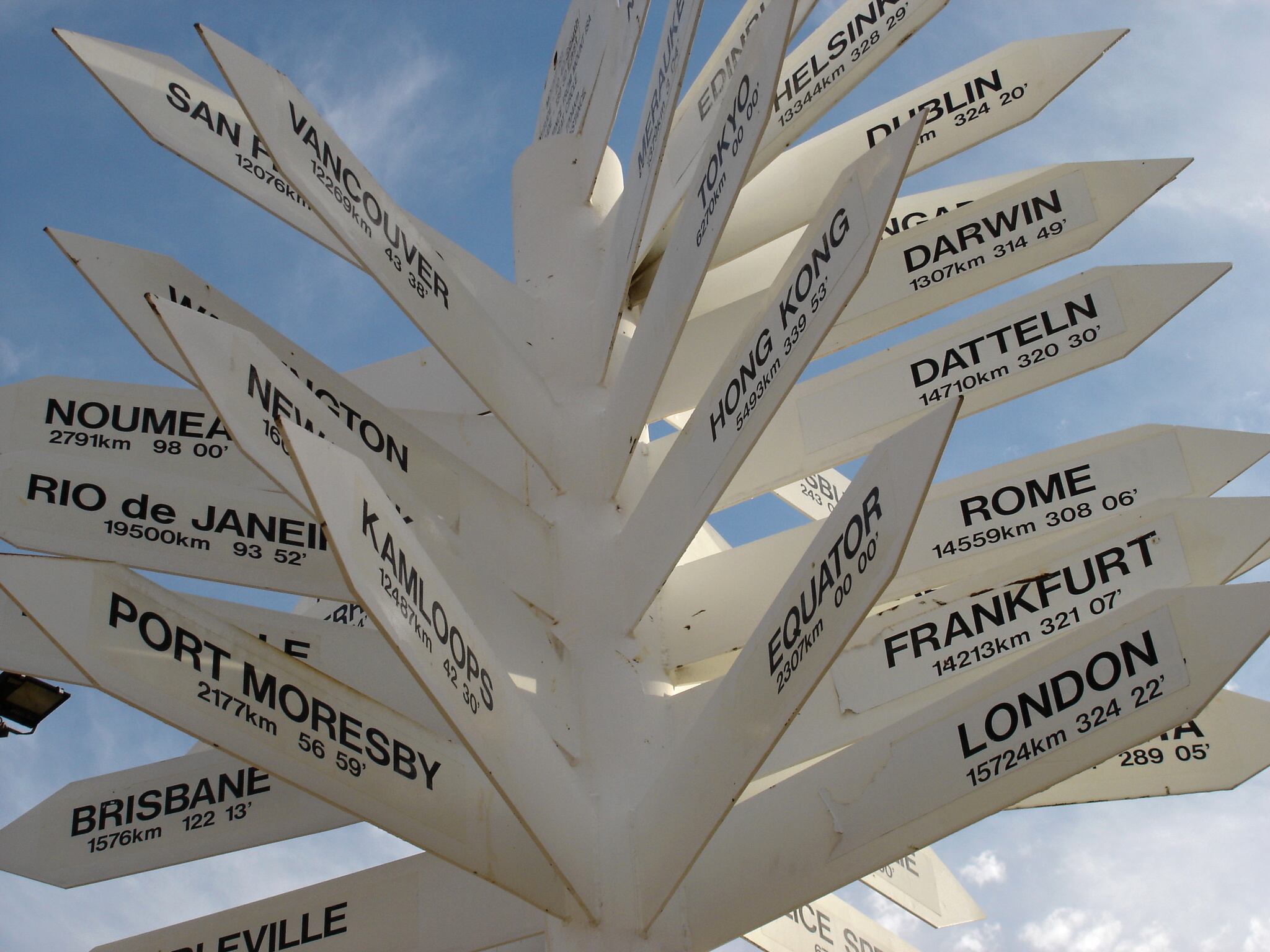
- Sign post at the lookout at The Gap

- Interactive map of The Gap
- Coordinates: 20.7261°S 139.4988°E
- Country: Australia
- State: Queensland
- LGA: City of Mount Isa
- Location: 0.8 km (0.50 mi) W of Mount Isa CBD; 903 km (561 mi) W of Townsville; 1,825 km (1,134 mi) NW of Brisbane

Government
  - State electorate: Traeger
  - Federal division: Kennedy

Area
  - Total: 0.7 km^{2} (0.27 sq mi)

Population
  - Total: 817 (2021 census)
  - Density: 1,170/km^{2} (3,020/sq mi)
- Time zone: UTC+10:00 (AEST)
- Postcode: 4825
Suburbs around The Gap
Menzies	Menzies	Pioneer
Mount Isa City	The Gap	Pioneer
Mornington	Mornington	Townview

The Gap is a suburb of the town of Mount Isa in the City of Mount Isa, Queensland, Australia. In the 2021 census, The Gap had a population of 817 people.

== Geography ==
The Leichhardt River flows north–south through the town of Mount Isa, dividing the suburbs of the town into "mineside" (west of the Leichhardt River) and "townside" (east of the Leichhardt River). The Gap is a "townside" suburb.

== History ==
The Gap was named by Queensland Place Names Board on 1 September 1973. On 16 March 2001 its status was changed from a locality to suburb.

== Demographics ==
In the 2016 census, The Gap had a population of 818 people.

In the 2021 census, The Gap had a population of 817 people.

== Education ==
There are no schools in The Gap. The nearest government primary schools are Mount Isa Central State School in neighbouring Mount Isa City (CBD) to the west and Townview State School in neighbouring Townview to the south-east.The nearest government secondary school is Spinifex State College which has its junior campus in Parkside to the south-west and its senior campus in neighbouring Pioneer to the east.

== Attractions ==
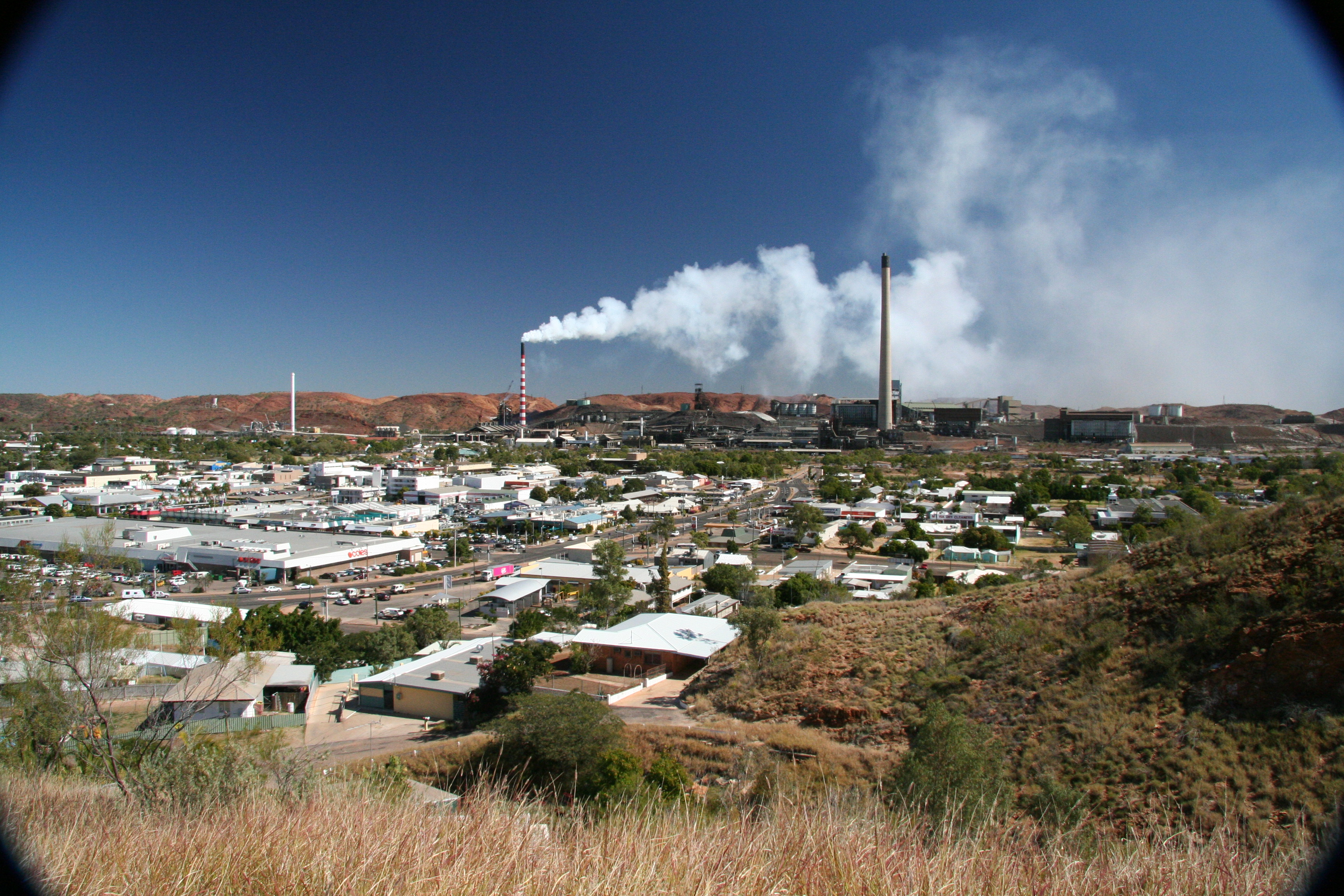
Panorama of Mount Isa from the lookout, 2006

Riversleigh Fossil Centre is a tourist attraction which features the fossils from the Riversleigh World Heritage Area. It is at 19 Marian Street (20.7265°S 139.4992°E).

The City Lookout has 360-degree panoramic views across the city of Mount Isa and is accessible both day and night. It is on Lookout Road, off Hilary Street (20.72342°S 139.49814°E).
