= Townview, Queensland =

Townview
- Suburb
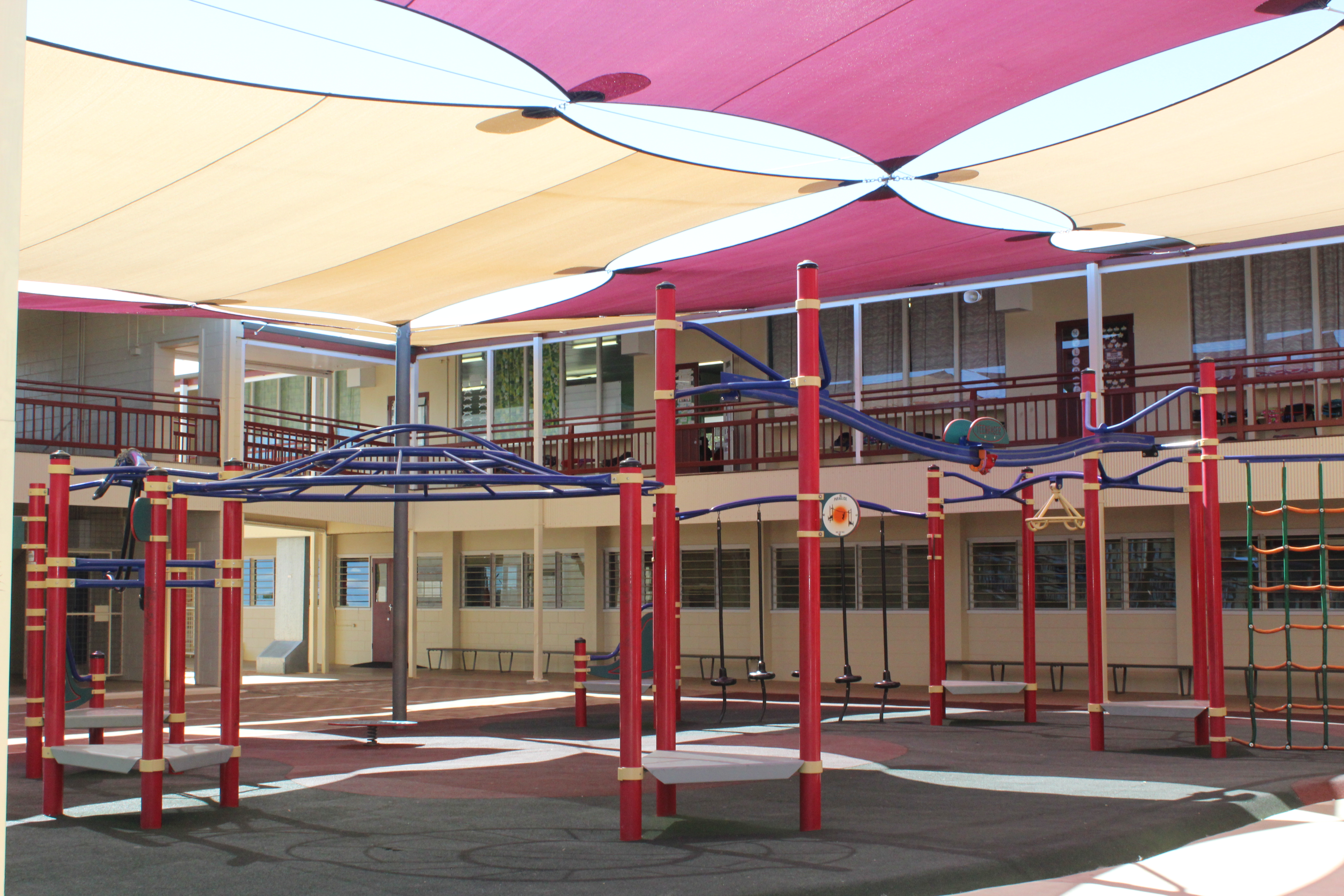
- Townview State School school buildings with shade sails, 2017

- Interactive map of Townview
- Coordinates: 20.7316°S 139.5058°E
- Country: Australia
- State: Queensland
- City: Mount Isa
- LGA: City of Mount Isa
- Location: 1.6 km (0.99 mi) E of Mount Isa CBD; 903 km (561 mi) WSW of Townsville; 1,825 km (1,134 mi) NW of Brisbane

Government
  - State electorate: Traeger
  - Federal division: Kennedy

Area
  - Total: 1.1 km^{2} (0.42 sq mi)
- Elevation: 380 m (1,250 ft)

Population
  - Total: 2,067 (2021 census)
  - Density: 1,880/km^{2} (4,870/sq mi)
- Time zone: UTC+10:00 (AEST)
- Postcode: 4825
Suburbs around Townview
The Gap	Pioneer	Pioneer
Mornington	Townview	Fisher
Mornington	Healy	Fisher

Townview (previously written as Town View) is a suburb of the town of Mount Isa in the City of Mount Isa, Queensland, Australia. In the 2021 census, Townview had a population of 2,067 people.

== Geography ==
The Leichhardt River flows north-south through the town of Mount Isa, dividing the suburbs of the town into "mineside" (west of the Leichhardt River) and "townside" (east of the Leichhardt River). Townview is a "townside" suburb.

Townview is bounded to the north by the Barkly Highway.

At 380 metres (1,250 ft) above sea level, Townview is slightly more elevated than other parts of Mount Isa, giving the suburb some views of the town and presumably its name.

== History ==
The spelling of Townview (often written as Town View) was standardised in 2003 at the request of the Mount Isa City Council.

Townview State School opened on 25 January 1965.

== Demographics ==
In the 2016 census, Townview had a population of 2,062 people.

In the 2021 census, Townview had a population of 2,067 people.

== Education ==
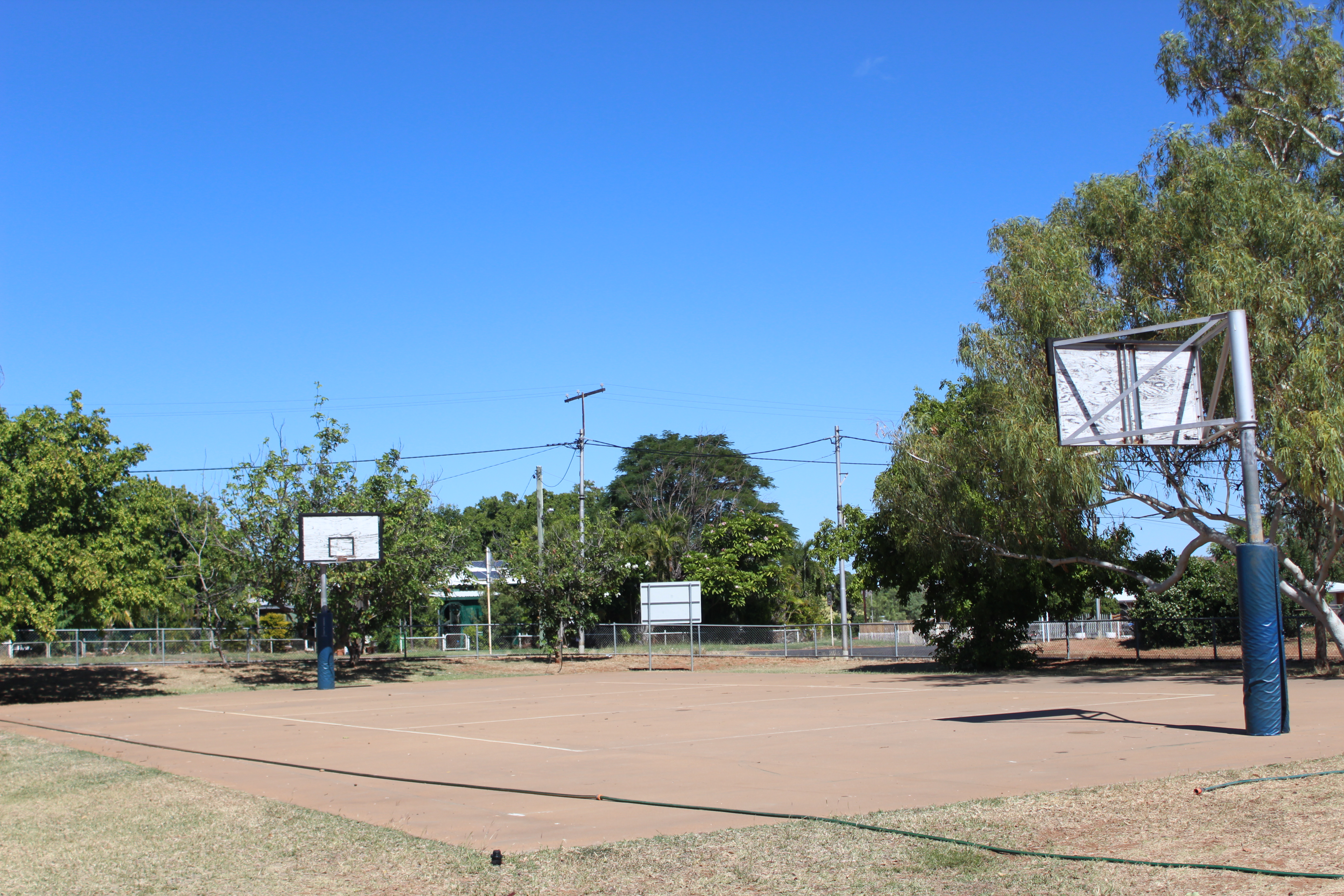
Townview State School basketball court, 2017

Townview State School is a government primary (Prep-6) school for boys and girls at 64-72 Clarke Street (20.7339°S 139.5073°E). In 2016, the school had an enrolment of 281 students (170 of whom identified as Indigenous Australians) with 25 teachers (24 full-time equivalent) and 18 non-teaching staff (13 full-time equivalent). In 2018, the school had an enrolment of 233 students (161 of whom identified as Indigenous Australians) with 24 teachers (22 full-time equivalent) and 20 non-teaching staff (15 full-time equivalent).

There are no secondary schools in Townview. The nearest government secondary school is Spinifex State College which has its junior campus in Parkside to the south-west and its senior campus in neighbouring Pioneer to the north.

== Amenities ==
There are a number of parks in the area:

- Enid Street Park (20.7356°S 139.5012°E)
- Kookaburra Street Park (20.7326°S 139.5062°E)
- Mcnamara Street Park (20.7384°S 139.5031°E)
