= Mount Isa, Queensland =

Mount Isa may refer to a number of related but different topics in Queensland, Australia:

- Mount Isa, a mining city in Australia
- City of Mount Isa, a local government area centred on the city
- Mount Isa City, Queensland, the central suburb of the city
- Mount Isa (locality), Queensland, the locality that surrounds the city and includes the mine
- Mount Isa Mines, the company that operates the mines
