= Healy, Queensland =

Healy
- Suburb
- Interactive map of Healy
- Coordinates: 20.7482°S 139.5009°E
- Country: Australia
- State: Queensland
- City: Mount Isa
- LGA: City of Mount Isa
- Location: 2.5 km (1.6 mi) SSE of Mount Isa CBD; 905 km (562 mi) WSW of Townsville; 1,826 km (1,135 mi) NW of Brisbane

Government
  - State electorate: Traeger
  - Federal division: Kennedy

Area
  - Total: 2.8 km^{2} (1.1 sq mi)

Population
  - Total: 1,824 (2021 census)
  - Density: 651/km^{2} (1,687/sq mi)
- Time zone: UTC+10:00 (AEST)
- Postcode: 4825
Suburbs around Healy
Parkside; Mornington	Townview	Fisher
Happy Valley	Healy	Fisher
Mica Creek	Spreadborough	Fisher

Healy is a suburb of the town of Mount Isa in the City of Mount Isa, Queensland, Australia. In the 2021 census, Healy had a population of 1,824 people.

== Geography ==
The Leichhardt River flows north–south through the town of Mount Isa, dividing the suburbs of the town into "mineside" (west of the Leichhardt River) and "townside" (east of the Leichhardt River). Healy is a "townside" suburb.

== History ==
On 1 September 1973, the suburb was named after Edward Kevin Emmett Healy, Under Secretary in the Queensland Department of Mines.

Healy State School opened on 24 January 1972.

== Demographics ==
In the 2016 census, Healy had a population of 1,878 people.

In the 2021 census, Healy had a population of 1,824 people.

== Education ==
Healy State School is a government primary (Prep-6) school for boys and girls at 5-9 Thomson Road (20.7419°S 139.5002°E). In 2016 the school had an enrolment of 163 students (83 of whom identify as Indigenous) with 12 teachers (11 full-time equivalent) and 13 non-teaching staff (10 full-time equivalent). In 2018, the school had an enrolment of 152 students with 12 teachers (11 full-time equivalent) and 11 non-teaching staff (9 full-time equivalent).

There is no secondary school in Healy. The nearest government secondary school is Spinifex State College which has its junior campus in neighbouring Parkside to the north-west and its senior campus in Pioneer to the north-east. The residential facility (boarding school) of Spinifex State College is at 83-85 Transmission Street in Healy (20.7371°S 139.5054°E).
