= Menzies, Queensland =

Menzies
- Suburb
- Interactive map of Menzies
- Coordinates: 20.7176°S 139.4970°E
- Country: Australia
- State: Queensland
- LGA: City of Mount Isa
- Location: 1.0 km (0.62 mi) N of Mount Isa CBD; 905 km (562 mi) W of Townsville; 1,826 km (1,135 mi) NW of Brisbane

Government
  - State electorate: Traeger
  - Federal division: Kennedy

Area
  - Total: 1.0 km^{2} (0.39 sq mi)

Population
  - Total: 824 (2021 census)
  - Density: 820/km^{2} (2,130/sq mi)
- Time zone: UTC+10:00 (AEST)
- Postcode: 4825
Suburbs around Menzies
| Soldiers Hill | Winston | Winston |
| Miles End | Menzies | Pioneer |
| Miles End | Mount Isa City | The Gap |

Menzies is a suburb of the town of Mount Isa in the City of Mount Isa, Queensland, Australia. In the 2021 census, Menzies had a population of 824 people.

== Geography ==
The Leichhardt River flows north–south through the town of Mount Isa, dividing the suburbs of the town into "mineside" (west of the Leichhardt River) and "townside" (east of the Leichhardt River). Menzies is a "townside" suburb.

== History ==
Menzies was named by the Queensland Place Names Board on 1 September 1973. On 16 March 2001 the status of Menzies was changed from a locality to a suburb.

St Kieran's Christian Brothers College opened on 25 January 1960 with an initial enrolment of 132 boys in Years 4 to 7 with Brother Tom Higgins as the first principal. By 1967 the school had an enrolment of over 300 boys in Years 4 to 10. Increasing enrolments put pressure on the classroom space and in 1970 the school ceased to offer Year 4 (as that was available at St Joseph's Catholic Primary School at Parkside). The school closed on 7 December 1984 as part of a rationalisation and amalgamation of the various Catholic schools in Mount Isa, resulting in Mount Isa Catholic High School (a merger of St Kieran's secondary school with the girls' secondary San Jose College) occupying the former St Kieran's site in Menzies. St Kieran's Catholic Primary School was then opened at a new site in Pioneer. On 20 May 2005 Mount Isa Catholic High School was renamed as Good Shepherd Catholic College.

== Demographics ==
In the 2016 census, Menzies had a population of 985 people.

In the 2021 census, Menzies had a population of 824 people.

== Education ==
Good Shepherd Catholic College is a Catholic secondary (7-12) school for boys and girls on the corner of Mary and Camooweal Streets (20.7220°S 139.4945°E). In 2017, the school had an enrolment of 489 students with 42 teachers and 25 non-teaching staff (22 full-time equivalent).

There are no government schools in Menzies. The nearest government primary school is Mount Isa Central State School in neighbouring Mount Isa City (the central business district) to the south. The nearest government secondary school is Spinifex State College which has its junior campus in Parkside to the south-west and its senior campus in neighbouring Pioneer to the east.
