= Miles End, Queensland =

Miles End
- Suburb
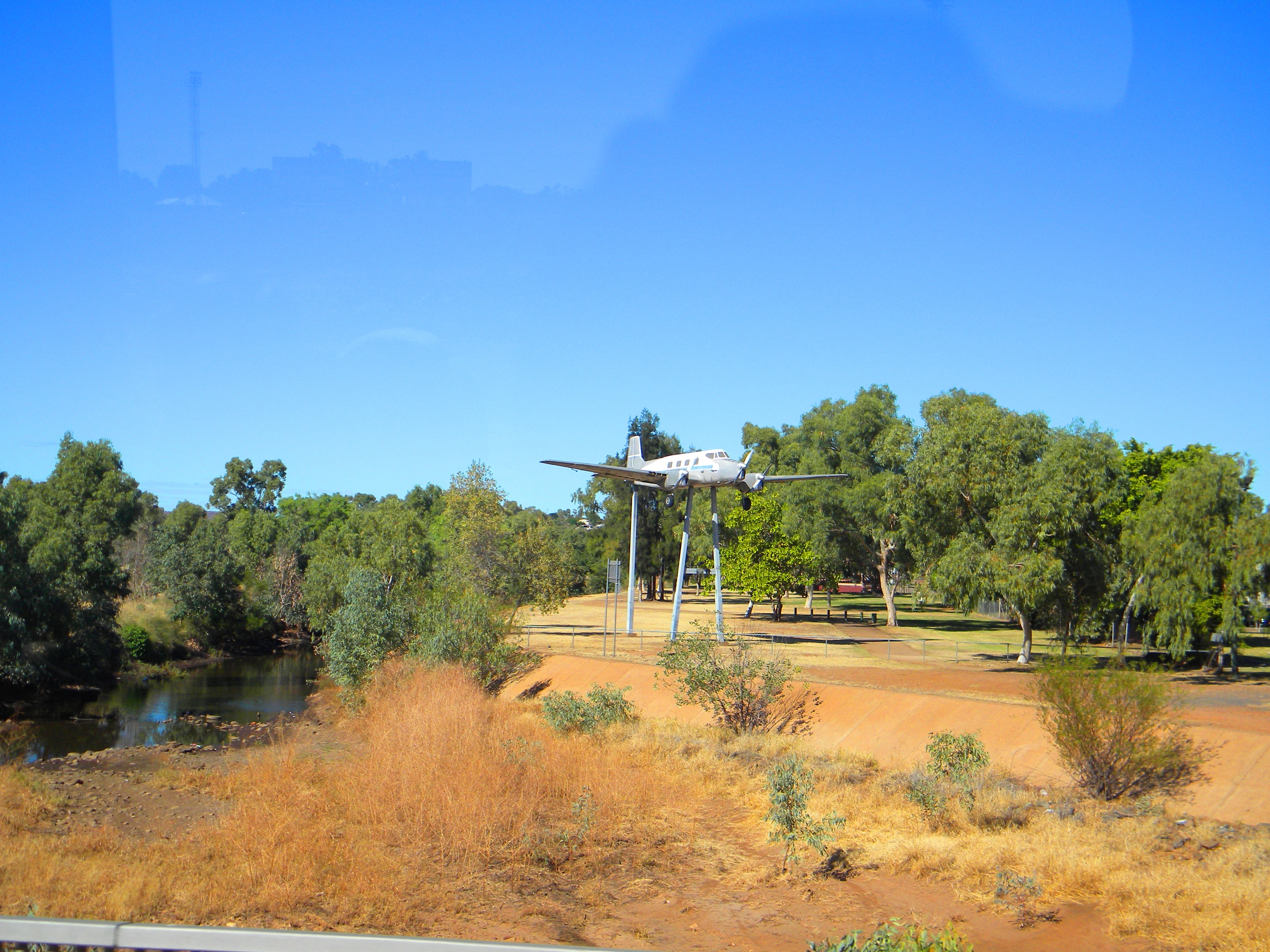
- Drover Aircraft in the Leichardt River Bed

- Interactive map of Miles End
- Coordinates: 20.7212°S 139.4873°E
- Country: Australia
- State: Queensland
- LGA: City of Mount Isa
- Location: 1.4 km (0.87 mi) NW of Mount Isa CBD; 905 km (562 mi) W of Townsville; 1,827 km (1,135 mi) NW of Brisbane

Government
  - State electorate: Traeger
  - Federal division: Kennedy

Area
  - Total: 0.9 km^{2} (0.35 sq mi)

Population
  - Total: 280 (2021 census)
  - Density: 311/km^{2} (810/sq mi)
- Time zone: UTC+10:00 (AEST)
- Postcode: 4825
Suburbs around Miles End
| Mount Isa (locality) | Soldiers Hill | Menzies |
| Mount Isa (locality) | Miles End | Menzies |
| Mount Isa (locality) | Parkside | Mount Isa City |

Miles End is a suburb of the town of Mount Isa in the City of Mount Isa, Queensland, Australia. In the 2021 census, Miles End had a population of 280 people.

== Geography ==
The Leichhardt River flows north–south through the town of Mount Isa, dividing the suburbs of the town into "mineside" (west of the Leichhardt River) and "townside" (east of the Leichhardt River). Miles End is a "mineside" suburb.

The suburb is bounded to the east in parts by the Leichhardt River, to the south by Isa Street and Station Street, to the west by Hooper Road (and the mine itself), and to the north by Carbonate Street and Alma Street. Despite the townside/mineside division of the suburbs, there is one exception. A small area along the riverside of West Street that contains the Mount Isa City Council's Civic Centre is not part of the townside suburb of Mount Isa City but part of the mineside suburb of Miles End that extends across the river.

== History ==
Miles End was named on 1 September 1973 by the Queensland Place Names Board. 16 March 2001 its status was changed from a locality to a suburb.

== Demographics ==
In the 2016 census, Miles End had a population of 265 people.

In the 2021 census, Miles End had a population of 280 people.

== Education ==
There are no schools in Miles End. The nearest government primary schools are Mount Isa Central State School in neighbouring Mount Isa City to the south-east and Barkly Highway State School in neighbouring Soldiers Hill to the north. The nearest government secondary school is Spinifex State College which has its junior campus in neighbouring Parkside to the south and its senior campus in Pioneer to the east.

== Amenities ==
The Mount Isa City Council operates a Civic Centre including a public library and park at 23 West Street (20.7255°S 139.4898°E). It is officially within Miles End but can only be accessed from Mount Isa City as this area is on the eastern side of the Leichhardt River, while the rest of the suburb is on the western side.
