= Mount Isa City =

Mount Isa City may refer to:

- Mount Isa City, Queensland, the central suburb of the city of Mount Isa in Australia
- City of Mount Isa, the local government area centered on the city of Mount Isa
- Mount Isa, the city itself
