= Kalkadoon =

Kalkadoon may refer to:

- Kalkadoon, Queensland, a suburb of Mount Isa, north-west Queensland, Australia
- Kalkatungu people, also known as the Kalkadoon people, an indigenous Australian tribe of the Mount Isa region
  - Kalkatungu language, also known as the Kalkadoon language, now extinct
  - Kalkadoon Wars, a series of late 19th century hostile encounters between the Kalkadoon people and European settlers
- Kalkadoon grasswren (Amytornis ballarae), a species of small bird endemic to north-west Queensland
- OH-58 Kalkadoon, Australian Army designation for Bell OH-58 Kiowa helicopters
