= Miles End =

Miles End may refer to:

- Miles End, Queensland, a suburb in the City of Mount Isa, Australia
- "Miles End", a song from the album In Our Gun by English indie rock band Gomez
