= Tent House, Mount Isa =

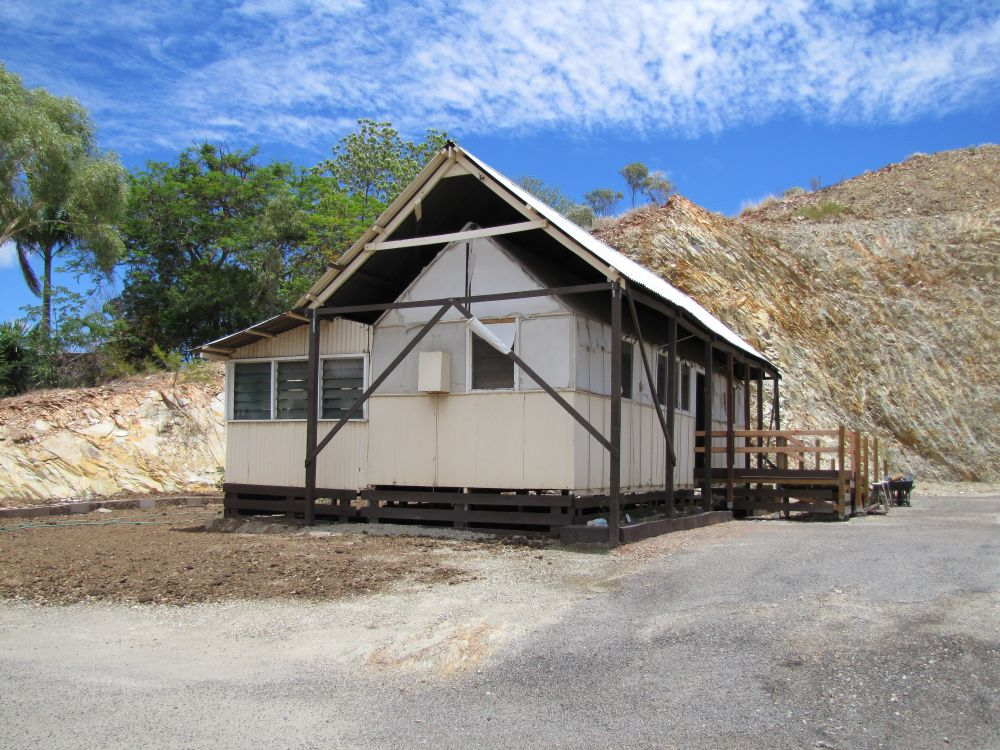
- Tent House, 2013

- Location within Queensland Location within Australia
- 20.7325°S 139.4883°E
- Location: Fourth Street, Parkside, City of Mount Isa, Queensland, Australia

History
- Design period: 1919–1930s (interwar period)
- Built: c. 1930

Queensland Heritage Register
- Official name: Tent House (Mount Isa)
- Type: state heritage (built)
- Designated: 21 October 1992
- Reference no.: 600742
- Significant period: 1930s (fabric, historical)
- Significant components: lawn/s, residential accommodation – workers' quarters

Tent House is a heritage-listed house at Fourth Street, Parkside, City of Mount Isa, Queensland, Australia. It was built c. 1930 and was added to the Queensland Heritage Register on 21 October 1992.

== History ==
The population growth of Mount Isa was rapid from 1926 to 1930, and this caused acute housing shortages.

In 1929, there were hundreds of tents, housing railway and construction workers, sprawled between the town and the mine. Other huts had walls made from beaten-out chemical drums from the mill, antbed floors and corrugated iron roofs. But a new town on the other side of the hill absorbed many. The settlement of Mount Isa Mines was built by the company on its leases for its own men, a planned and self-contained town which was approached through a valley guarded by a gatekeeper. Leslie Urquahart was the creator of the company town. His policy sprang from his experience in Russia and he realised that in a region with a harsh climate and a reputation for industrial unrest of the employees' welfare was an essential investment. This policy of providing extensive accommodation for employees was regarded as an "interesting experiment" – it was not the norm in 1929. By mid-1929 fifty cottages for workmen and seven staff houses had been completed, along with reticulated water supply and septic tank installation. A self-contained staff house, with twenty-one bedrooms, reading and dining rooms had also been completed. Five dormitories for single men, each accommodating forty men, and a mess hall to serve them were in the course of erection, but owing to the rapid increase of work at the mines, temporary accommodation capable of housing 400 men was erected.

The growth of the community continued to present problems for company management during the years when there was difficulty financing housing developments. The 1934 Directors' Report commented:

"A portion of the community consists of 60 tents erected in 1930. These were in a bad state of repair, and after representations by the employees in this section, the company agreed to furnish the material for converting these temporary dwellings into tent houses. The employees, co-operating among themselves, furnished the labour."

Conversion of a tent into a tent house included the addition of an iron roof above the existing tent roof and iron walls outside the tent walls. The air space between the iron and the fabric helped to keep the house cool in the summer months.

Another labour boom at the end of the 1940s led to tent accommodation being used. But it was the massive expansion of copper mining in the Old Black Rock lease in the 1960s which led to the removal of most of the early buildings of the company town as they were located on top of the ore.

The tent house at Fourth Avenue, now managed by the National Trust, was one of the last remaining in the city in 1967 when it was decided to retain it as a museum piece.

In 2013, the Tent House was relocated to Underground Hospital site where it can be better protected and more accessible to tourists.

== Description ==
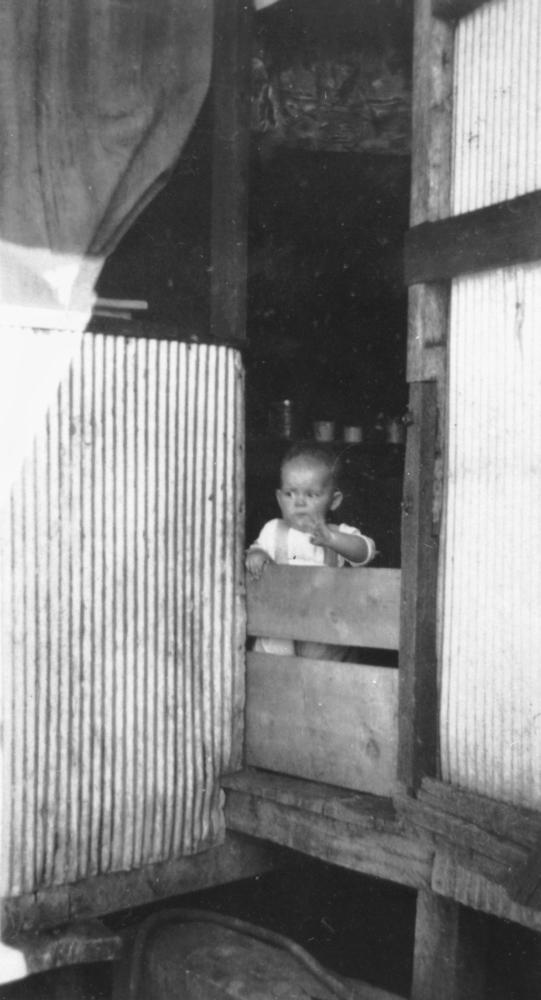
Tent houses, Mount Isa, circa 1930

The house is a simple timber frame structure with a gable roof and enclosed verandah on the eastern side. An elevated timber frame gable tent roof is set over the house enclosing and shading it with a 1 metre (3 ft 3 in) space between roofs. The house roof and gable walls are covered with canvas. The remaining walls are clad with ripple iron. The enclosed verandah and tent roof are clad in corrugated iron. The sides of the house and verandah are lined with glass louvre windows. The building stands on a grassed allotment. The house was described in 1937 as - "three roomed house, walls of galvanised iron and drum roof; roof of galvanised iron, partitions of iron and wood, floor of boards and earth". The only other surviving tent house in Mount Isa was demolished in 1991.

== Heritage listing ==
The Tent House was listed on the Queensland Heritage Register on 21 October 1992 having satisfied the following criteria.

The place demonstrates rare, uncommon or endangered aspects of Queensland's cultural heritage.

The tent house is significant as a rare survivor of a once common type of accommodation erected in Mount Isa in the 1930s to ease the housing shortage.

The place has a strong or special association with a particular community or cultural group for social, cultural or spiritual reasons.

Although the construction and design principals were adopted for other permanent Queensland public buildings, this tent house was originally constructed as a temporary structure. Its survival is due to the local community wanting to retain a physical link with the early mining settlement.
