= Good Shepherd Catholic College, Mount Isa =

Good Shepherd Catholic College
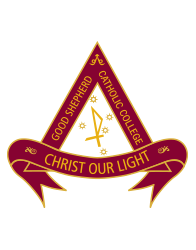

Location
- Cnr Mary & Camooweal Street, Menzies; Mount Isa, Queensland; Australia; 20°43′16″S 139°29′41″E

Information
- Former names: St Kieran's College (1960–1985); San Jose College (1965–1985)
- Type: Systemic secondary day school
- Motto: Christ our Light
- Religious affiliation: Catholicism
- Denomination: Congregation of Christian Brothers (1960–1985); Sisters of St Joseph of the Sacred Heart (1965–1985)
- Established: 1960; 66 years ago (as St Kieran's College)
- Founder: Congregation of Christian Brothers
- Oversight: Diocese of Townsville (since 1965)
- Principal: Peter Scott
- Gender: Co-educational
- Website: goodshepherd.catholic.edu.au

Good Shepherd Catholic College is a Catholic systemic coeducational secondary day school, located in Menzies, Mount Isa Queensland, Australia. Good Shepherd Catholic College caters for students from Years 7 to 12, and is closely associated with Good Shepherd Parish, Mount Isa. The school comprises two former schools, Mount Isa Catholic High School and St Kieran's College.

== History ==
In January 1960 three Christian Brothers opened St Kieran's. They had the care for the education of the Catholic boys of Mount Isa from Grades 5 to 10. In 1965 the Sisters of St Joseph of the Sacred Heart opened San Jose College for girls. San Jose School educated girls until 1985 when it merged with Saint Kieran's College at St Kieran's site. The new co-educational school was named Mount Isa Catholic High School. The "old" San Jose premises became St. Joseph's Primary School.

== See also ==
- Lists of schools in Queensland
- List of Christian Brothers schools
- Catholic education in Australia
