= John Campbell Miles =

John Campbell Miles (5 May 1883, Richmond, Melbourne – 4 December 1965, Ringwood, Victoria) was an Australian prospector and pastoral worker who discovered the mineralisation upon which the Mount Isa Mines were established in Queensland.

== Biography ==
John Campbell Miles was born on 5 May 1883 in Richmond, Melbourne to Thomas Miles and Fanny Louisa Miles (née Chancellor). He was the eighth of nine children. He was a wanderer and an adventurer from the time he ran away from school to work with a bootmaker. Blainey listed his quick progression of jobs as ploughman, miner, carter, railway navvy, wild-pig hunter and windmill repairer.

At the age of twenty-four (1907) he took a job as underground worker at Broken Hill, but stayed only until the following April before riding his bicycle 1,500 miles to the newly discovered Oaks goldfield (later known as Kidston) in north Queensland. Miles would return to labouring work on the railways within a few months.

From the Oaks, Miles worked as farm labourer in the Wimmera, then returned to Queensland where he spent ten years drifting from station to station, probably supplementing his wages by fossicking. After a brief visit to Melbourne in 1921, he decided to follow up the reminiscences of an elderly boundary rider who claimed to have seen gold on the Murranji Track, a cattle trail in the Northern Territory.

He travelled slowly with his six horses, camping near to Hughenden and Richmond and visiting the ghost town of Mount Elliott on the Cloncurry copper field. Between Duchess and Camooweal he first met William Simpson of the Native Bee mine, who later became his partner. By this time it was February 1923 and he had been traveling for over a year. Knowing that he was in copper country he would often take his hammer and do some prospecting. One day while searching amongst a small range of ridges he broke open a yellow-brown rock and found that the inside was black and honeycombed and the rock was surprisingly heavy. Breaking more rocks found more black and grey mineralisation over a large area. He was not aware that the mineral he was exposing was cerussite, a lead carbonate, but some of the pieces contained galena, which he recognised from his time at Broken Hill.

With most of the mineralisation associated with a black crust of manganese and iron oxide, Miles scanned the area from the spine of the range noting the largest areas of mineralisation. After thoroughly exploring the ridges, Miles approached some copper gougers who were also unable to identify the mineral, but advised Miles to send specimens to Cloncurry where the Government Assayer would analyse them. The samples were found to be very high in lead and silver.

Once Miles received the assay results he was certain that he had made an important discovery. He began mining the ore and when the warden asked him to name his leases, he chose the name, Mount Isa. In 1924, he sold his leases to the fledgling Mount Isa Mines Ltd for 500 shares, nominally worth £10 000. Although he sold many of these at low prices in the years when the mine was struggling, he saved enough to live a frugal and unhurried life, spent prospecting in the Northern Territory, Lawn Hill and Victoria and living in virtual obscurity. He sold the last of his shares in 1933.

Miles is also credited with helping to prove that the rocks that hosted his discovery were not Silurian, as geologists then believed. He was the first to find trilobites near May Downs, which he showed to geologist E.C. Saint-Smith who identified them as being Cambrian. The rocks at Mount Isa, being older, were thus ‘Precambrian’.

He revisited Mount Isa at the invitation of the company in 1957. It was probably characteristic of Miles, whose only admitted vice was pipe-smoking, that he should return to the north-west overland by car, camping under the stars, and then accept accommodation only in the workers' barracks.

On 4 December 1965, he died unmarried at Ringwood, Melbourne and was cremated. In 1968, his ashes were interred under the clock tower on Miles Street, Mount Isa. The Department of Natural Resources and Mines core storage facility at Mount Isa is also named in his honor.
