= City of Mount Isa =

Coordinates: 20°43′29″S 139°29′37″E

- Local government area
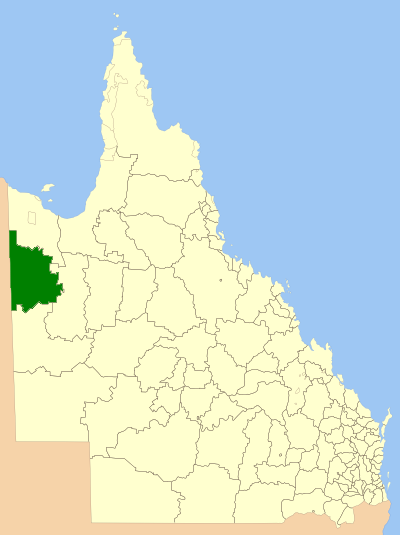
- Location within Queensland

- Interactive map of City of Mount Isa
- Country: Australia
- State: Queensland
- Established: 1914
- Council seat: Mount Isa

Government
  - Mayor: Peta MacRae
  - State electorate: Traeger
  - Federal division: Kennedy

Area
  - Total: 43,713 km^{2} (16,878 sq mi)

Population
  - Total: 18,727 (2021 census)
  - Density: 0.428408/km^{2} (1.10957/sq mi)
- Website: City of Mount Isa
LGAs around City of Mount Isa
| Roper Gulf (NT) | Burke | Burke |
| Barkly (NT) | City of Mount Isa | Cloncurry |
| Barkly (NT) | Boulia | Cloncurry |

The City of Mount Isa is a local government area in north west Queensland. The City covers the urban locality of Mount Isa, the administrative centre, and surrounding area, sharing a boundary with the Northern Territory to the west.

Mount Isa is a reasonably affluent district. The largest industry in the city is the Mount Isa Mines, a source of lead, copper, silver and zinc. Cattle grazing and tourism are other industries of note.

In the 2021 census, the City of Mount Isa had a population of 18,727 people.

== History ==
The city was inhabited by the Kalkadoon and Indjilandji people, whose livelihood depended on hunting and gathering, fishing and trade for several thousands of years, before the European settlers arrived here. The Kalkadoon craftsmen were known for their stone implements and handmade tools which were traded with other Aboriginal groups spread all over the western Queensland.

Kalkatunga (also known as Kalkadoon, Kalkadunga, Kalkatungu) is an Australian Aboriginal language. The Kalkatunga language region is North-West Queensland including the local government areas of the City of Mount Isa.

On 10 February 1914, the Shire of Barclay Tableland, based in Camooweal, was incorporated on an area previously managed by the shires of Burke and Cloncurry. On 14 August 1919 the spelling was changed and it became known as Shire of Barkly Tableland. As a consequence of the growth of Mount Isa as a mining and population centre within the shire, an Order in Council dated 15 December 1962 renamed the shire to Shire of Mount Isa, effective 1 July 1963, and its administration centre relocated to Mount Isa. At the same time it gained part of the Shire of Cloncurry. On 30 May 1968, the shire was proclaimed as a City due to the area reaching a population of 18,000.

== Demographics ==
| Year | Population |
|---|---|
| 1954 | 7,884 |
| 1961 | 13,967 |
| 1966 | 17,485 |
| 1971 | 26,502 |
| 1976 | 26,536 |
| 1981 | 24,390 |
| 1986 | 23,927 |
| 1991 | 24,735 |
| 1996 | 22,866 |
| 2001 | 21,473 |
| 2006 | 19,663 |
| 2011 | 21,237 |
| 2016 | 18,671 |
| 2021 | 18,727 |

== Towns and localities ==
The City of Mount Isa includes the following settlements:

=== Suburbs of the town of Mount Isa ===
Mineside Mount Isa:

- Happy Valley
- Kalkadoon
- Mica Creek
- Miles End
- Parkside
- Soldiers Hill

Townside Mount Isa:

- Breakaway
- Fisher
- Healy
- Lanskey
- Menzies
- Mornington
- Mount Isa City
- Pioneer
- Ryan
- Spreadborough
- Sunset
- The Gap
- Townview
- Winston

=== Rural areas outside the town ===
- Mount Isa (locality)
- Barkly
- Camooweal
- Gunpowder
- Lawn Hill

== Amenities ==
The Mount Isa City Council operate a public library at Mount Isa City.

== Chairmen and mayors ==
- 1927: John Thomson Campbell
- 1955–1963: Len Doughan
- 1963–1964: Victor (Vic) Moffatt
- 1964-1965: Len Doughan
- 1965–1969: George McCoy
- 1969–1973: Bill Weigh
- 1973–1975: Angelo Bertoni
- 1975–1985: Franz Born
- 1985–1990: Tony McGrady
- 1990–2008: Ron McCullough
- 2008–2012: John Molony
- 2012–2016: Tony McGrady
- 2016–2020: Joyce McCulloch
- 2020–2024: Danielle Dee Slade
- 2024-present: Peta MacRae

== Sister cities ==
Sister cities of Mount Isa include:

- (Australia) Bankstown, Sydney, New South Wales
