= Parkside, Queensland =

Parkside
- Suburb
- Interactive map of Parkside
- Coordinates: 20.7368°S 139.4881°E
- Country: Australia
- State: Queensland
- City: Mount Isa
- LGA: City of Mount Isa
- Location: 1.6 km (0.99 mi) SE of Mount Isa CBD; 906 km (563 mi) WSW of Townsville; 1,827 km (1,135 mi) NW of Brisbane

Government
  - State electorate: Traeger
  - Federal division: Kennedy

Area
  - Total: 1.5 km^{2} (0.58 sq mi)

Population
  - Total: 1,530 (2021 census)
  - Density: 1,020/km^{2} (2,640/sq mi)
- Time zone: UTC+10:00 (AEST)
- Postcode: 4825
Suburbs around Parkside
| Mount Isa (locality) | Miles End | Mount Isa City |
| Mount Isa (locality) | Parkside | Mornington |
| Mount Isa (locality) | Happy Valley | Healy |

Parkside is a suburb of the town of Mount Isa in the City of Mount Isa, Queensland, Australia. In the 2021 census, Parkside had a population of 1,530 people.

== Geography ==
The Leichhardt River flows north-south through the town of Mount Isa, dividing the suburbs of the town into "mineside" (west of the Leichhardt River) and "townside" (east of the Leichhardt River). Parkside is a "mineside" suburb.

== History ==
St Joseph's Catholic Primary School was established by the Sisters of St Joseph on Railway Avenue in 1923 and operated there until 1984. In 1964, the Sisters established a secondary school for girls called San Jose Catholic Secondary School (also known as San Jose College) on Twenty-Third Avenue. Both schools closed as part of a rationalisation and amalgamation of Catholic schools in Mount Isa. On 29 January 1985, St Joseph's Catholic Primary School relocated to the San Jose site in Twenty-Third Avenue, while the San Jose College amalgamated with St Kieran's Christian Brothers College in Menzies to form the co-educational Mount Isa Catholic High School (later renamed Good Shepherd Catholic College) at the former St Kieran's site at Menzies.

Mount Isa State High School opened on 2 February 1953. It closed on 31 December 2002. In 2003 it amalgamated with Kalkadoon State High School to create Spinifex State College with two campuses, a junior campus (7-9) at the former Mount Isa State High School site and a senior campus (10-12) at the former Kalkadoon State High School (in Pioneer). Mount Isa State High School's website has been archived.

== Demographics ==
In the 2011 census, Parkside had a population of 1,784 people.

In the 2016 census, Parkside had a population of 1,532 people.

In the 2021 census, Parkside had a population of 1,530 people.

== Heritage listings ==
Parkside has a number of heritage-listed sites, including:

- Tent House, Camooweal Street (20.7325°S 139.4883°E)
- Spinifex State College Junior Campus, 6-12 Fifth Avenue (20.7341°S 139.4866°E)

== Education ==
Spinifex State College is a government secondary (7-12) school for boys and girls In 2017, the school had an enrolment of 817 students with 77 teachers and 71 non-teaching staff (58 full-time equivalent). It includes a special education program. The junior campus (Years 7-9) is at 6-16 Fifth Avenue (20.7348°S 139.4871°E), while the senior campus is in Pioneer to the north-east.

St Joseph's Catholic School is a Catholic primary (Prep-6) school for boys and girls at 50 - 60 Twenty-Third Avenue (20.7447°S 139.4912°E). In 2017, the school had an enrolment of 313 students with 22 teachers (20 full-time equivalent) and 18 non-teaching staff (12 full-time equivalent).

There is no government primary school in the suburb. The nearest government primary school is Happy Valley State School in neighbouring Happy Valley to the south.

== Amenities ==
There are a number of parks in the area:

- Captain James Cook Park (20.7441°S 139.4893°E)
- Magpie Street Park (20.7312°S 139.4872°E)
