= Pioneer, Queensland =

Pioneer
- Suburb
- Interactive map of Pioneer
- Coordinates: 20.72°S 139.5080°E
- Country: Australia
- State: Queensland
- City: Mount Isa
- LGA: City of Mount Isa
- Location: 2.2 km (1.4 mi) NE of Mount Isa CBD; 903 km (561 mi) W of Townsville; 1,824 km (1,133 mi) NW of Brisbane

Government
  - State electorate: Traeger
  - Federal division: Kennedy

Area
  - Total: 1.4 km^{2} (0.54 sq mi)

Population
  - Total: 2,346 (2021 census)
  - Density: 1,680/km^{2} (4,340/sq mi)
- Time zone: UTC+10:00 (AEST)
- Postcode: 4825
Suburbs around Pioneer
Winston	Sunset	Sunset
Menzies	Pioneer	Fisher
The Gap	Townview	Fisher

Pioneer is a suburb of the town of Mount Isa in the City of Mount Isa, Queensland, Australia. In the 2021 census, Pioneer had a population of 2,346 people.

== Geography ==
The Leichhardt River flows north–south through the town of Mount Isa, dividing the suburbs of the town into "mineside" (west of the Leichhardt River) and "townside" (east of the Leichhardt River). Pioneer is a "townside" suburb.

== History ==
The suburb is called Pioneer because many European pioneer names are used as street names in the area.

Kalkadoon State High School opened on 2 February 1953. It closed on 31 December 2002. In 2003, it amalgamated with Mount Isa State High School to create Spinifex State College with two campuses, a junior campus (7-9) at the former Mount Isa State High School (in Parkside) and a senior campus (10-12) at the former Kalkadoon State High School. Kalkadoon State High School's website has been archived.

Mount Isa School of the Air opened on 22 June 1964.

Mount Isa Special School opened on 29 January 1973.

St Kieran's Christian Brothers College opened on 25 January 1960 in Menzies with an initial enrolment of 132 boys in Years 4 to 7 with Brother Tom Higgins as the first principal. By 1967 the school had an enrolment of over 300 boys in Years 4 to 10. Increasing enrolments put pressure on the classroom space and in 1970 the school ceased to offer Year 4 (as that was available at St Joseph's Catholic Primary School at Parkside). The school closed on 7 December 1984 as part of a rationalisation and amalgamation of the various Catholic schools in Mount Isa, resulting in St Kierans opening as a new primary school on 4 February 1985 in Pioneer.

== Demographics ==
In the 2011 census, Pioneer had a population of 2,621 people.

In the 2016 census, Pioneer had a population of 2,176 people.

In the 2021 census, Pioneer had a population of 2,346 people.

== Education ==
St Kieran's Catholic School is a Catholic primary (Prep-6) school for boys and girls at Short Street (20.7155°S 139.5072°E). In 2017, the school had an enrolment of 150 students with 15 teachers (12 full-time equivalent) and 12 non-teaching staff (6 full-time equivalent). In 2018, the school had an enrolment of 146 students with 13 teachers (11 full-time equivalent) and 15 non-teaching staff (8 full-time equivalent).

Mount Isa Special School is a special-education government primary and secondary (Prep-12) school for boys and girls at 116 Marian Street (20.7242°S 139.5132°E). In 2017, the school had an enrolment of 27 students with 9 teachers (8 full-time equivalent) and 11 non-teaching staff (8 full-time equivalent). In 2018, the school had an enrolment of 33 students with 9 teachers (8 full-time equivalent) and 11 non-teaching staff (8 full-time equivalent).

Mount Isa School of the Air is a government primary and secondary (Early Childhood-10) school for boys and girls at 137-143 Abel Smith Parade (20.7212°S 139.5094°E). In 2017, the school had an enrolment of 153 students with 26 teachers (25 full-time equivalent) and 13 non-teaching staff (9 full-time equivalent). In 2018, the school had an enrolment of 154 students with 24 teachers (23 full-time equivalent) and 15 non-teaching staff (10 full-time equivalent). It provides distance education to students living in remote outback locations extending north to the Gulf of Carpentaria, south to Birdsville, east to Richmond and west to the Northern Territory.

Spinifex State College is a government secondary (7-12) school for boys and girls In 2017, the school had an enrolment of 817 students with 77 teachers and 71 non-teaching staff (58 full-time equivalent). The senior campus (Years 10–12) is at 145 - 163 Abel Smith Parade (20.7223°S 139.5099°E), while the junior campus (Years 7–9) is in Parkside to the south-west. It includes a special education program.

There is no mainstream government primary school in Pioneer. The nearest mainstream government primary schools are Sunset State School in neighbouring Sunset to the north, Townview State School in neighbouring Townview to the south, and Mount Isa Central State School in Mount Isa City to the west.
