= Queensland place naming =

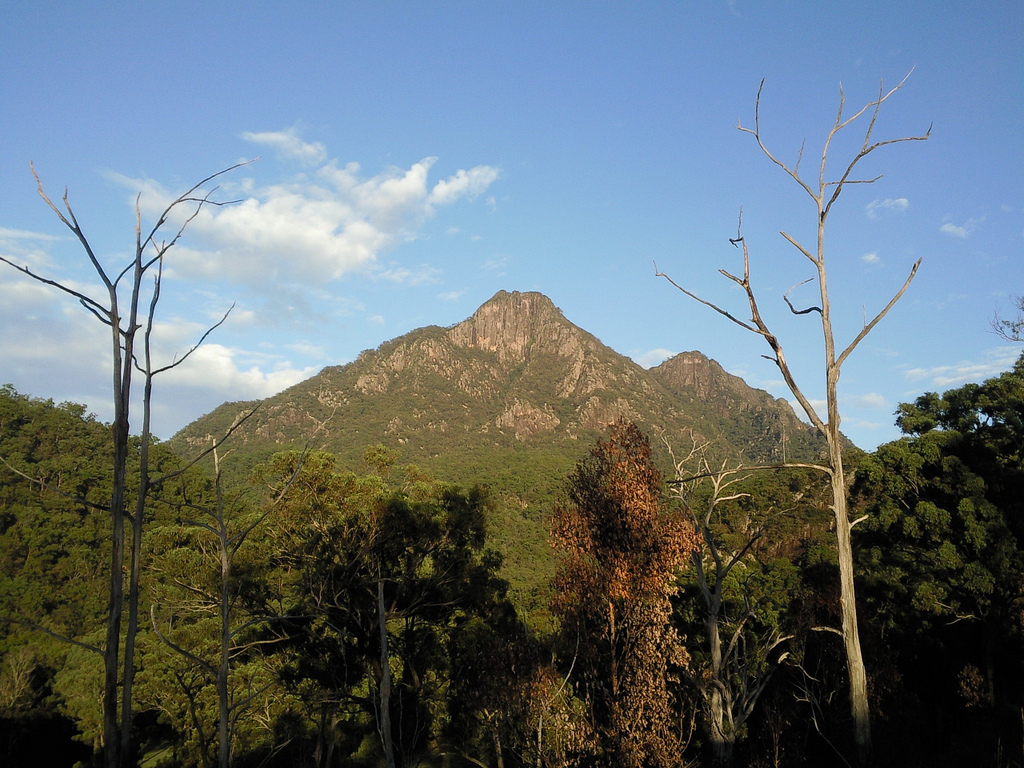
Mount Barney is an officially named mountain peak in Queensland

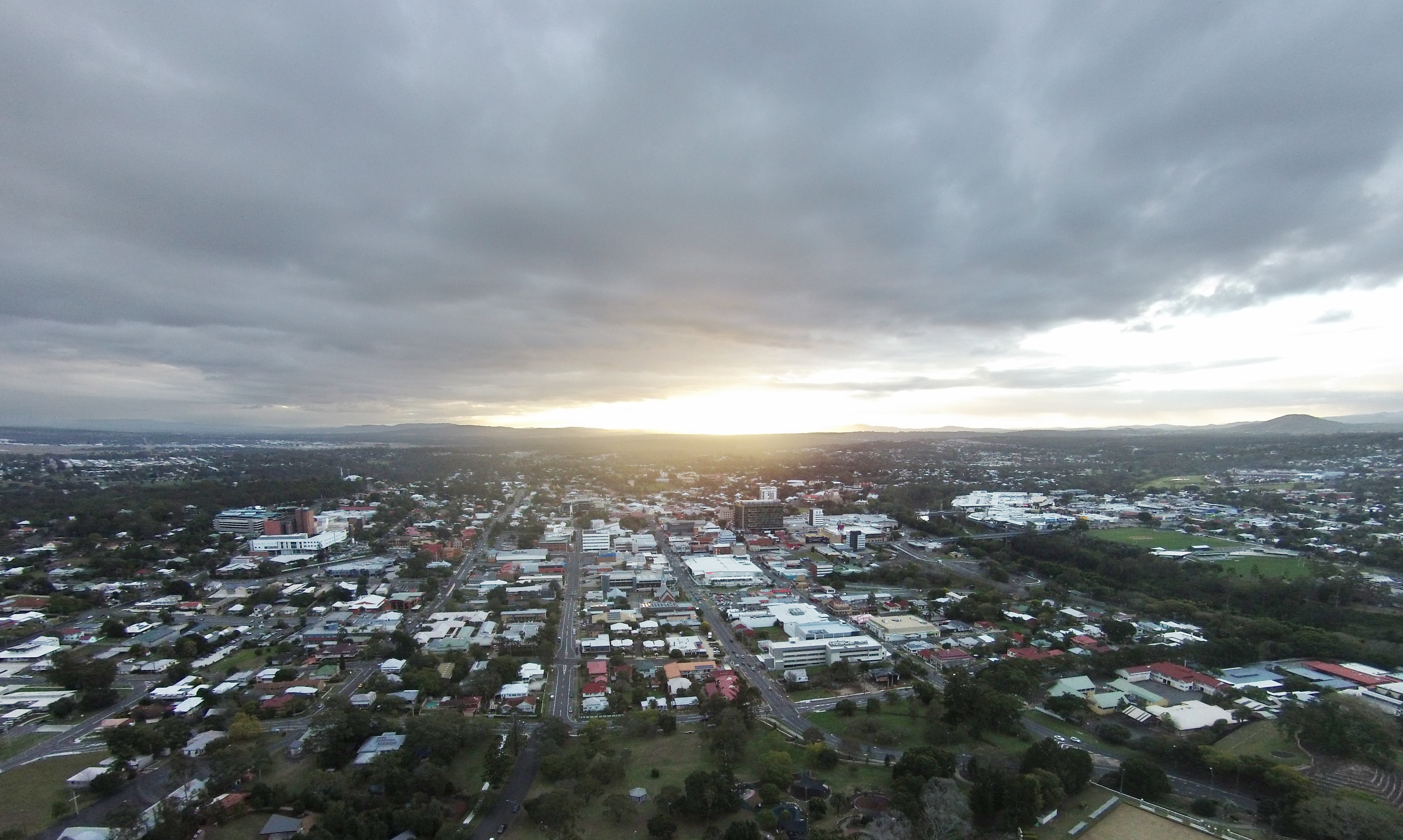
The town of Ipswich is officially named in Queensland

Queensland place naming is the process by which the Queensland Government assigns names to locations of natural features (for example, mountains and rivers) and man-made places such as settlements for example, towns and suburbs) within Queensland, Australia. Place naming must be consistent and accurate to prevent confusion and inefficiency in everyday activities, for example, delivering goods and services, and strict guidelines apply to place naming in Queensland.

== History ==
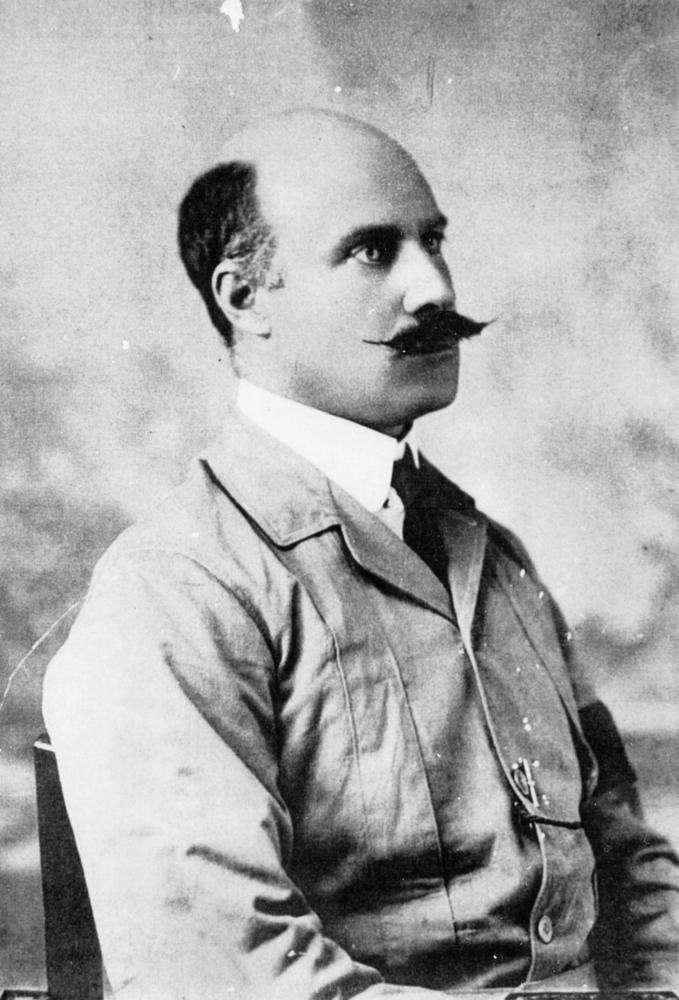
Professor Frank Cumbrae-Stewart

Queensland place naming was the responsibility of the Surveyor General of New South Wales until the Separation of Queensland in 1859. After separation, names were supplied by the Railways Department (now Queensland Rail), the Queensland Post Office (now part of Australia Post) and the Department of Public Instruction (now Department of Education and Training) for ratification by the Department of Lands and the Surveyor General of Queensland.

In the early 1920s, an unofficial committee comprising the Surveyor General, Commissioner of Railways, head of the Department of Public Instructions and university representatives was formed to approve and ratify all new place names. Professor Frank Cumbrae-Stewart, representing The University of Queensland, was an influential committee member, who later became Chairman of the Queensland Place Names Committee. Other contributors to the recording of the history of place names were Sydney May and Colin Gill.

The Queensland Place Names Act 1958 set up the Queensland Place Names Board to approve names in the State. The Queensland Place Names Act 1988 disbanded the board and passed the responsibility for place naming to the Surveyor General, with Executive Council approving the names.

The Place Names Act 1994 gave the power for approval of place names to a Minister of the Crown. As at 2017, the Minister for Natural Resources and Mines exercises this power. Records were first recorded on a card system, started by the unofficial committee in the 1920s. These cards were moved to The University of Queensland and later returned to the Department of Lands (Survey Office). In the 1940s, another more extensive card system was compiled using information from cadastral, topographic and military maps and the existing card system. In 1988, a computer system for place names was developed and all available information was entered into the Queensland place names database.

== Current arrangements ==
Place names can be looked up on-line by the public on the Queensland Government's website. Queensland place names are contributed into the Gazetteer of Australia maintained by the Australian Government.
