= Mount Isa City, Queensland =

Mount Isa City Mount Isa, Queensland
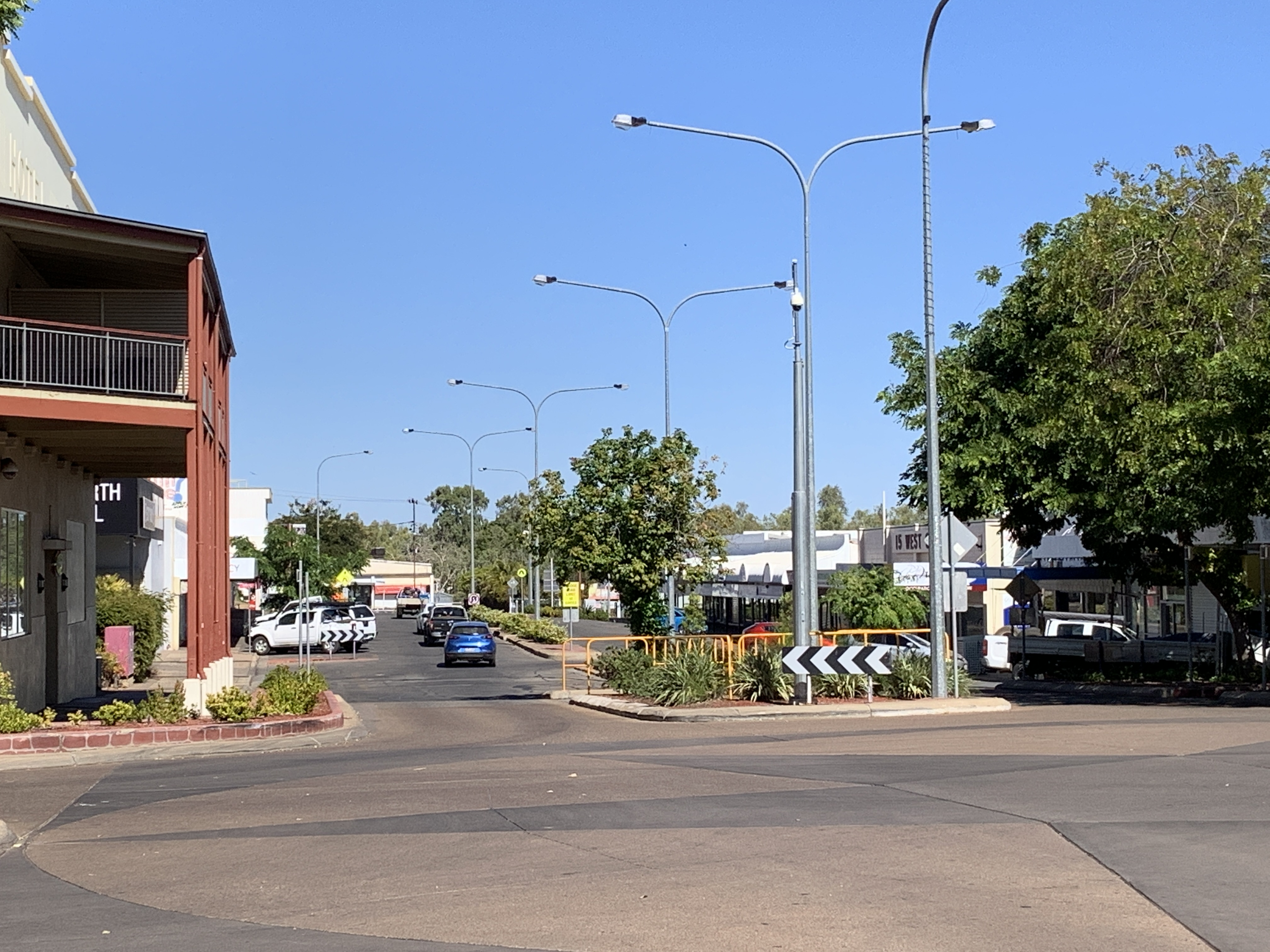
- Looking south along West Street from Rodeo Drive, 2019

- Coordinates: 20.7258°S 139.4927°E
- Population: 170 (2021 census)
  - Density: 340/km^{2} (880/sq mi)
- Postcode(s): 4825
- Elevation: 350–360 m (1,148–1,181 ft)
- Area: 0.5 km^{2} (0.2 sq mi)
- Time zone: AEST (UTC+10:00)
- Location: 904 km (562 mi) W of Townsville; 1,826 km (1,135 mi) NW of Brisbane
- LGA(s): City of Mount Isa
- State electorate(s): Traeger
- Federal division(s): Kennedy
Suburbs around Mount Isa City:
Miles End	Menzies	Menzies
Miles End	Mount Isa City	The Gap
Parkside	Parkside	Mornington

Mount Isa City is the central suburb and central business district of the town of Mount Isa in the City of Mount Isa, Queensland, Australia. In the 2021 census, Mount Isa City had a population of 170 people.

== Geography ==
The Leichhardt River flows north-south through the town of Mount Isa, dividing the suburbs of the town into "mineside" (west of the Leichhardt River) and "townside" (east of the Leichhardt River). Mount Isa City is a "townside" suburb.

The suburb is bounded to the west in parts by the Leichhardt River, to the north by Mary Street, to the east in parts by Atherton Street and Gray Street, and to the south by Isa Street and Dora Street. Despite the townside/mineside division of the suburbs, there is one exception. A small area along the riverside of West Street that contains the Mount Isa City Council's Civic Centre is not part of the townside suburb of Mount Isa City but part of the mineside suburb of Miles End that extends across the river.

The land is mostly flat, ranging between 350 and 360 metres (1,150 and 1,180 ft) above sea level.

As the central business district for the town, the land use is predominantly commercial services with only a small amount of residential development mostly in the east of the suburb.

== History ==
The name reflects it is the central suburb of Mount Isa, the name suggested by prospector John Campbell (Cam) Miles who had the first mineral lease on the silver/lead deposit at Mount Isa in February 1923. It is thought to be a deliberate corruption of Mount Ida, the abandoned mining town in Western Australia which featured in the reminiscences of his friend Moses Rowlands.

Mount Isa Provisional School opened on 28 July 1924. In 1926 it became Mount Isa State School. was proclaimed a state school in 1926. In 1966 it was renamed Mount Isa Central State School.

The Mount Isa branch of the Queensland Country Women's Association was founded in May 1928, making it the longest-serving community organisation in Mount Isa.

== Demographics ==
In the 2016 census, Mount Isa City had a population of 95 people.

In the 2021 census, Mount Isa City had a population of 170 people.

== Education ==
Mount Isa Central State School is a government primary (Prep-6) school for boys and girls at 49 Miles Street (20.7232°S 139.4919°E). In 2017, the school had an enrolment of 203 students with 22 teachers (21 full-time equivalent) and 19 non-teaching staff (13 full-time equivalent).

There are no secondary schools in the suburb. The nearest government secondary school is Spinifex State College which has its junior campus in neighbouring Parkside to the south-west and its senior campus in Pioneer to the east.

== Facilities ==
Mount Isa Police Station is at 7-9 Isa Street (20.7286°S 139.4909°E).

Mount Isa Fire Station is at 35 West Street (corner of Helen Street, 20.7237°S 139.4905°E).

== Amenities ==
The Mount Isa City Council operates a Civic Centre including a public library and park at 23 West Street (20.7255°S 139.4898°E). While it is officially in Miles End, it can only be accessed from Mount Isa City.

The Copper City Mount Isa branch of the Queensland Country Women's Association has its rooms at 3 Isa Street (20.7286°S 139.4912°E).

The Salvation Army Hall is at 43 West Street (20.7232°S 139.4906°E).
