= Spinifex State College Junior Campus =

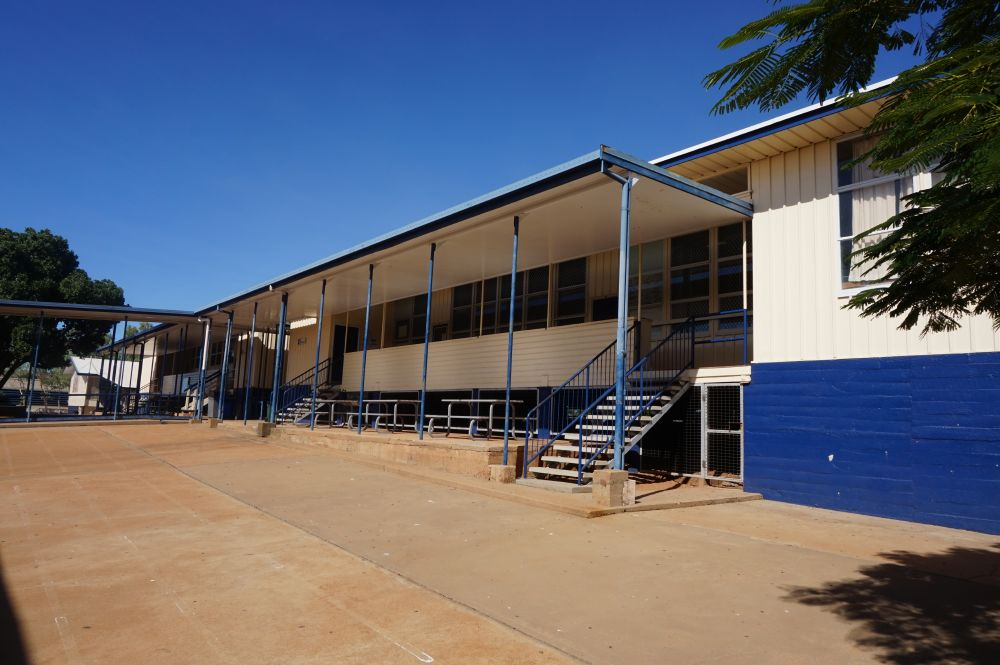
- Block G (foreground) and Block F (in distance) with covered link, 2018

- Location within Queensland
- 20.7341°S 139.4866°E
- Location: 6–12 Fifth Avenue, Parkside, Mount Isa, City of Mount Isa, Queensland, Australia

History
- Design period: 1940s–1960s (Post-WWII)
- Built: 1954, 1955–1957, 1955, 1956, 1956, 1957, 1960, 1960

Site notes
- Architect: Department of Public Works (Queensland)
- Architectural style: Modernism

Queensland Heritage Register
- Official name: Spinifex State College Junior Campus; Mount Isa State High School; Mount Isa Intermediate School
- Type: state heritage
- Designated: 23 August 2018
- Reference no.: 650065
- Type: Education, Research, Scientific Facility: School – state (high)
- Theme: Educating Queenslanders: Providing secondary education

Spinifex State College Junior Campus is a heritage-listed state high school at 6–12 Fifth Avenue, Parkside, Mount Isa, City of Mount Isa, Queensland, Australia. It was designed by Department of Public Works (Queensland) and built in 1954. It is also known as Mount Isa State High School and Mount Isa Intermediate School. It was added to the Queensland Heritage Register on 23 August 2018.

== History ==
Spinifex Junior College was founded in 1953 as Mount Isa State High School serving the mining town of Mount Isa. It is located on the west side of the Leichhardt River, about 0.75 km south of the main mine site and 1 km southwest of the Mount Isa central business district. The site includes five Hawksley prefabricated school buildings (1954–1960), a connecting link (1955–1957), and a head teacher's residence (1956). These were built when the town was rapidly evolving from a mining settlement of itinerant workers to a substantial regional company town supporting families. The school has a strong and ongoing association with the Mount Isa community.

The Mount Isa area is part of the traditional lands of the Kalkadoon people. Located about 820 km west of Townsville, the town is situated within an extensive mineral-rich area stretching from south of Cloncurry to west of Burketown. The Mount Isa mineral field was discovered by John Campbell Miles in 1923, who named the place after his niece Isobel (Isa being an abbreviation of Isobel). An early analysis of the ore revealed a very high lead content. It later also produced silver, zinc and copper. A rudimentary town developed after Mount Isa Mines Ltd (MIM) was floated as a company in January 1924. A township was surveyed on the east side of the Leichhardt River and soon included a police station, courthouse, hospital, hotels, post office, and banks. The Townsville-Duchess rail line (1912) was extended to Mount Isa in 1929. By 1930 MIM had consolidated its activities in the field, financed initially by Russo-Asiatic Consolidated Ltd, and later with American Smelting and Refining Company backing. Many senior management staff were American. The town also had the largest Finnish community in Australia in the 1930s.

MIM created its own company township on the western side of the river, close to the mine, with company stores, bank and recreational facilities, while the private commercial centre remained on the eastern side. This created two settlements known as Mineside (west) and Townside (east). A convent school was established in 1932 between these two settlements. High school classes were offered at the Mount Isa Mines State School from 1937.

The local Member of the Queensland Legislative Assembly, AJ (Norm) Smith wrote to the Minister for Public Instruction in 1945, advocating a merger of the two state schools to establish one central state school, combined with a technical college and a high top (the precursor to a high school, using existing school infrastructure). While the primary schools remained separate, this letter, along with the growth of the town, the development of MIM and its need for trained staff, served to initiate the foundation of a high school in Mount Isa.

During World War II (WWII), MIM initiated policies favouring the employment of married men and began building houses for married employees, providing barracks for single men. After WWII, a large housing construction project was initiated with the Queensland Housing Commission. The town's tent houses (a surviving example of which is now the heritage-listed Tent House) and corrugated iron dwellings were replaced with houses built in timber (some were recycled army buildings) or locally manufactured concrete bricks. Employee numbers grew from 1,025 in June 1947 to 2,550 in June 1952. This sharp increase was a direct result of the meteoric rise in the price of lead, as profits rose from £150,000 in 1946 to £500,000 in 1947, and £1,457,000 in 1947–48. This profitability resulted in the establishment of a lead bonus whereby employees were paid an additional few pence per shift, as a share in these profits (the lead bonus was not compensation for the health hazards of exposure to lead). The lead bonus reached £5 per week in 1947–48, and £17 5s during the Korean War in 1951, making Mount Isa a very attractive proposition to workers. By 1955 MIM was the largest mining company in Australia and by 1960 Mount Isa produced 60 per cent of Queensland's mineral wealth and employed more than 50 per cent of the state's mining workforce.

MIM continued to support long-term employees by employing their family members, while simultaneously demanding higher education standards. In the 1950s, the Apprenticeship Board required the completion of Year 8 for electrical apprenticeships and grades 6 or 7 for other apprenticeships. MIM required the Junior Public Exam (Year 10) for electrical apprentices and the completion of Scholarship (Year 8) or Sub-Junior (Year 9) for all others. This policy created a demand for secondary education. A 1949 report from the inspector of Secondary Schools and Technical Colleges advocated the establishment of a new intermediate and high school in Mount Isa with technical classes attached. The inspector noted that there were 60 apprentices employed in the mines, a further four in the town, and that the mining company would hire a further 100 if they were available. Enrolments in the three primary schools had grown from a total of 458 in 1945 to 771 in 1949. The establishment of a high school was regarded as urgent.

In 1950, the Department of Education acquired a nine-acre recreation reserve (a former football field), and an adjacent five-acre mining lease was surrendered by MIM, totalling just over 14 acres (5.66ha). Department of Public Works (DPW) architects produced plans for the new timber school on the site and called for tenders for its construction in late 1951. These plans were not fulfilled. Instead, in August 1952 it was announced Hawksley prefabricated aluminium buildings would be used.

Prefabricated buildings from Hawksley Construction Co. of Gloucester, England, were ordered by the Queensland Government for use in schools in response to the materials shortage and construction pressure of the post-WWII baby boom. The buildings employed an aluminium structure, external cladding of ribbed aluminium sheets, and aluminium-framed awning windows. Components used techniques developed during WWII in aircraft manufacture including pop-riveting, and synthetic gaskets and sealants. As a consequence, these structures had an industrial aesthetic.

The DPW assembled the buildings highset or lowset, and with a verandah for circulation accessing a series of classrooms. Ideally, they were oriented so the verandah faced north and the classrooms faced south. The extensive, operable glazing provided abundant natural light and ventilation. The classrooms were 24 ft x 24 ft (7.3m x 7.3m), larger than most previous classrooms. The DPW ordered 27 Hawksley buildings comprising 90 classrooms, which began to arrive in Queensland in late 1952. The local Mimag magazine praised the choice of the Hawksley buildings because of the rapidity of construction.

At Mount Isa, the first Hawksley building was erected quickly, completed by 25 March 1953, accommodating the high school during the day and technical classes at night for apprentices. The second Hawksley building was completed by the start of 1954 and accommodated the principal's office and science classrooms. The third (Block J, Hawksley Unit Type 'A') was completed by June 1954, with its concrete slab floor laid by MIM. It was a manual arts classroom building and included a woodwork room, sheet metalwork room, and trade drawing room. The fourth was completed in 1955 (Block F, Hawksley Unit Type 'G') and accommodated two general classrooms and a library. The fifth was completed in 1956 (Block G, Hawksley Unit Type 'B') and accommodated domestic science classrooms. The school held night classes for more than 100 students (mostly MIM apprentices) and adult education classes in shorthand, typing, and bookkeeping were offered. A fete held in June showcased the achievements of the students including the cooking from the new domestic science wing.

The buildings were laid out on the site at regular intervals along a central spine created by a covered link. The link was built in stages as the buildings were added and they included covered "lunch areas", a broader section of the link on the north side of the buildings that included seats for students. The lunch area seats were disposed of after 2007.

The high and intermediate school was established at a time of transition for Mount Isa, which became a prosperous regional centre increasingly occupied by families. 300 new homes were built by late 1954. However, a housing shortage remained in Mount Isa in the early 1950s and government employees had difficulty finding housing. The first principal of Mount Isa State High School agreed to the appointment only if housing was provided, which it wasn't, and he soon transferred out. In September 1954, the subsequent principal requested a government house and a standard teacher's residence (Type 'D') designed by the DPW was built by May 1956. This was a modest timber-framed and -clad highset building with three bedrooms and was built facing Fifth Avenue away from the teaching buildings surrounded by a fenced house yard. The house was slightly modified in c. 1961 to provide a larger front balcony, to a DPW design that was a standard "improvement" to this type. the alteration to the front balcony appears to have been an improvement to the standard design that was introduced c. 1957 and was made to houses of this type that had been built earlier such as the one in Mount Isa.

MIM had direct involvement with the school's establishment and provision of facilities and fostered education in the town. The company provided school furniture and sport equipment, surveyed the site to provide for the playing fields and school buildings, and MIM staff were employed as technical teachers. From late 1955, MIM offered secondary education and university scholarships for science and engineering students, with priority given to children of MIM employees. The company needed qualified workers in both technical and commercial subjects and the 1960 school magazine revealed that more than one third of the school's past students were employed by MIM as assayers, apprentice electricians, boilermakers, fitter and turners, clerks and clerk-typistes. Despite these educational opportunities, the principal Mr Crosswell, speaking at the 1955 speech night, suggested that there was a lack of interest in education in the town, partly because of the ease of obtaining employment. He hoped the scholarships offered would encourage higher participation.

The township continued to consolidate and include further civic amenities and by late 1957 Mount Isa State High School officially became a technical college and a class II high school. A sixth Hawksley building (Block H, Hawksley unit type 'C') was built in late 1957, accommodating two general classrooms and a commercial classroom. A seventh Hawksley building (Block I, of an unidentified type) was built by the beginning of 1960. It was built as a two-storey building with the Hawksley component used for the first floor and comprising four general classrooms. The ground floor accommodated open pay space and a classroom and store room, which were converted to a physics classroom and store in 1961. The construction of this building included a large concrete battered retaining wall to its south to create a flat platform for the building.

Over time the school grew to include further buildings. These included: a second teacher's residence (by 1962); a trades' workshop (1965); science building (1967–8, demolished c. 1990s); a general classroom building with canteen (c. 1968, extended c. 1971); a new manual arts building (1971); homecraft building (1973); library and administration block (1974); and science building (1977, demolished c. 2002), for which the first two Hawksley buildings and the adjacent connecting links were demolished. A new Technical and Further Education (TAFE) College was built elsewhere in Mount Isa and the school no longer provided technical college-level education and those buildings were converted for flexible classroom space in 1973. A multi-purpose hall was built by 2002.

In 2003 Mount Isa State High School became the Junior Campus of Spinifex State College. The Senior Campus was established on the site of the former Kalkadoon State High School on the east side of the town. In that year MIM was taken over by Anglo-Swiss Company Xstrata, which merged with Glencore in 2013. Both companies continued to provide local apprenticeships and university scholarships, while the school has continued its trade training programs.

In 2018 Spinifex State College Junior Campus retains five Hawksley prefabricated school buildings (Blocks J, F, G, H, and I, 1954–60), the most extensive complex of Hawksley buildings known in Queensland. As at 2018, there are two Hawksley buildings remaining at Southport State High School (built 1955, 1957–58) and one at Maryborough Central State School (built 1955). It is known that Cavendish Road State High School had a Hawksley building but it is not known if this building survives intact. Spinifex State College Junior Campus also retains covered links (1955–7) and a head teacher's residence (1956).

== Description ==
Spinifex State College Junior Campus occupies on a 5.66ha site on the "mine side" of the Leichhardt River, 1.2 km southwest of the centre of Mount Isa. The large site gently slopes to the east. The complex of buildings stands on the higher west part of the site, with large playing field on the lower, east half. The head teacher's residence faces Fifth Avenue, standing away from the teaching buildings.

The school is bounded by Fifth Avenue (south) to which the school fronts, Fourth Avenue (east), Third Avenue (north), and by residential properties (west).

=== Layout and Courtyards ===
Blocks J, F, G, H, and I are long and narrow teaching buildings with long sides facing north and south. They are laid out fairly symmetrically either side of an axial connecting link, except Block J (the former Manual Training Building), which is not connected by the link and stands alone to the north.

The buildings are positioned to form open-ended courtyards between them for student play space and activities. The courtyards are flat and a large concrete retaining wall with steel pipe balustrade and concrete stairs stands on the southern side of Block I.

=== Connecting link ===
The connecting link (constructed in regularised modules) forms a central axis connecting Blocks F, G, and H, and wraps the north face of these buildings to form a broad covered "Lunch Area" immediately north of their verandahs. The link and lunch areas have a concrete floor and comprise regularly-spaced metal posts supporting an almost flat, timber-framed roof clad with metal sheets. The ceiling is lined with flat sheets without cover strips. A row of openings above the roof of the lunch areas (formerly enclosed with glass louvres) provides further light and ventilation of the verandah.

=== Blocks J, F, G, H, and I ===
Blocks J, F, G, and H are all Hawksley prefabricated school buildings. They are intact one-storey, lowset on concrete slab floors. Block I is two-storey with the upper level being the Hawksley portion, highset on concrete posts and steel beams to a DPW design. The former open play area of the ground floor of Block I has been mostly enclosed to form additional classrooms.

The buildings are long and narrow, with northern verandahs accessing a series of classrooms on the southern side, and have gable roofs clad with corrugated metal sheets. The verandah wall and the opposing classroom wall are highly glazed with operable windows to permit high levels of natural light and ventilation.

Block H has had no changes to the partitions between its three classrooms. Only very minor changes have been made to the partitions between classrooms of Blocks F, G, and I. Block J has had its original classroom partitions removed and a modern one inserted (2019) to create two classrooms.

=== Head teacher's residence ===
The head teacher's residence is a DPW Standard Residence Type 'D'. It is an intact, modest, one-storey highset timber-framed and -clad residence standing in a defined house yard facing Fifth Avenue. The understorey is enclosed on the perimeter with spaced horizontal planks. It has a gable roof with a perpendicular gable over the front bedroom clad with corrugated metal sheets. The front balcony enlarged in c. 1961 to a standard DPW design is also intact.

== Heritage listing ==
Spinifex State College Junior Campus was listed on the Queensland Heritage Register on 23 August 2018 having satisfied the following criteria.

The place is important in demonstrating the evolution or pattern of Queensland's history.

Spinifex State College Junior Campus (established in 1953 as Mount Isa State High School) is important in demonstrating the evolution of state education and its associated architecture in Queensland. The place retains excellent, representative examples of standard school buildings that were architectural responses to prevailing government educational philosophies.

It retains five Hawksley prefabricated school buildings (Blocks J, F, G, H, and I – 1954–1960) and a connecting link (1955–1957), an extensive, rare, and representative example of the adoption and deployment of prefabricated systems imported for schools by the Queensland Government from 1952, in response to acute building material shortages and population growth in the period.

The head teacher's residence (1956) is a representative example and product of the Queensland Government's policy to provide accommodation for married male head teachers as an inducement to teach in rural areas.

The place demonstrates rare, uncommon or endangered aspects of Queensland's cultural heritage.

Highly intact, the five Hawksley prefabricated school buildings are rare surviving examples of imported prefabricated Hawksley School Buildings and are the only known examples of Hawksley unit types "A" (Block J), "B" (Block G), "C" (Block H), and "G" (Block F) in Queensland, with a fifth building of an unidentified type (Block I). The school is exceptional as the most extensive known complex of Hawksley buildings in a Queensland school.

The place is important in demonstrating the principal characteristics of a particular class of cultural places.

The Hawksley prefabricated school buildings are excellent, rare examples of their type and demonstrate variations of the standard unit types. Highly intact, they retain their: prefabricated aluminium-framed and-clad structures; gable roofs; verandahs for circulation; 24 ft (7.3m) wide classrooms; subject specific ancillary rooms; and extensive banks of aluminium-framed awning windows to maximise natural light and ventilation.

The head teacher's residence is an excellent intact example of a standard type of residence designed by the Department of Public Works and built in schools across Queensland from 1952 to 1959. The principal characteristics of this type includes: highset, timber-framed and -clad construction with a gable roof; located in an open residential yard facing a street; modest provision of internal space with three bedrooms, lounge, dining, bathroom, and kitchen; banks of awning windows; and internal partitions and ceilings lined with flat sheet material and cover strips.

The place has a strong or special association with a particular community or cultural group for social, cultural or spiritual reasons.

Schools have always played an important part in Queensland communities. They typically retain significant and enduring connections with former pupils, parents, and teachers; provide a venue for social interaction and volunteer work; and are a source of pride, symbolising local progress and aspirations.

Spinifex State College Junior Campus has a strong and ongoing association with the Mount Isa community which has supported the development of the school, both physically and financially. It was established in 1953 and generations of students have been taught there. The place is important for its contribution to the educational development of the Mount Isa region, supported by Mount Isa Mines Ltd (MIM), and as a focus for the community.

The place has a special association with the life or work of a particular person, group or organisation of importance in Queensland's history.

Spinifex State College Junior Campus has had a long association with MIM, which provided the impetus for the establishment of a high school by increasing the education standards required for apprentices to gain employment in the mines. MIM provided part of the land on which the school was built and supplied furnishings, equipment, and sports facilities. MIM offered university scholarships to students of this high school and actively promoted education in this company town, as well as providing ongoing support in funding improvements to school facilities since 1953.
