= Spinifex State College =

- Mount Isa, Queensland; Australia

Information
- Type: Public, day and boarding
- Motto: Sharing Knowledge, Creating Our Future
- Established: 2003
- Grades: 7–12
- Gender: Co-educational
- Colors: Navy, gold, white
- Website: spinifexsc.eq.edu.au

Spinifex State College is a public, co-educational, day and boarding school located in Mount Isa, Queensland. It first opened in 2003.

== History ==
Prior to 2003, Mount Isa was serviced by two state secondary schools. Mount Isa State High School and Kalkadoon State High School had served the community well.

Following community consultation it was determined that to continue to provide the best possible education to students in Mount Isa that it was timely to merge the two schools. At the same time it was decided to open a residential campus to provide opportunities to students from outlying communities who do not have a secondary school.

Spinifex State College officially opened in 2003. It is a three-campus co-educational school, with a Junior, Senior and Residential (boarding) campus. Spinifex State College offers and educational program for years 7–12.

== The Campuses ==
=== Junior Campus ===
The Junior Campus provides education for students in years 7–9. The school is based on a ‘school within a school’ concept with a Deputy and Head of department assigned to, and managing each year level. In addition to this there is also a Pathways Program that caters for students who are not achieving success in the mainstream program. Some of the pathway students attend at the junior campus, some attend a class at the senior campus and others attend a class based at Mount Isa Special School. The Junior campus is equipped with tennis courts and basketball courts. The junior campus is at 6–16 Fifth Avenue in Parkside (20.7348°S 139.4871°E), the former site of Mount Isa State High School.

=== Senior Campus ===
The Senior campus provides from years 10 to 12. Students select a course of study from a wide variety of offerings including Queensland Studies Authority subject, Authority Registered subjects and also TAFE courses.

Spinifex College has a Special Education Unit at the junior campus and a Special Education Class at the senior campus.

The senior campus is at 137–179 Abel Smith Parade in Pioneer (20.7229°S 139.5106°E). The senior campus shares the site with the Mount Isa School of the Air, the Mount Isa campus of TAFE Queensland, and the Mount Isa Special School. It is the site of the former Kalkadoon State High School.

=== Residential Campus ===
The Residential campus is the first state-run boarding facility in Queensland for students attending a state school. This campus has the capacity to board and provide educational support to 57 students.

== Industry Links ==
Since opening in 2003 the college has worked closely with local industry partners. In 2004, in partnership with Xstrata, Mount Isa Mines a Bursary program was introduced for year 11 students. Selected students attend Xstrata one day a week in Year 11 and during school holidays. This is then progressed into a SAT once students have identified their area of preference. In 2007 a new “Skills for the Future” program was offered for Year 9 students to give them an opportunity to attend the Xstrata Skills Centre and experience trade skills.

Close links with Mount Isa TAFE have enabled a number of TAFE courses to be embedded into the school timetable.

Spinifex College is also a Queensland Minerals and Energy Academy hub school. The Queensland Minerals and Energy Academy (QMEA) provides students with clear pathways into one of the state's largest, dynamic and economically important sectors

== Extra curricular activities ==
=== Sporting ===
In 2006, Spinifex State College sent away a Touch Football team, the Taipans, to Singapore to compete in the World All Schools Touch Football competition, an event which attracts hundreds of teams from schools around the world. The Taipans won the competition. The college has also developed several successful Rugby league, Cricket, Soccer, Australian Rules Football, Softball and Hockey teams.

Spinifex State College hosts its own netball club, and in 2015 had seven teams participate in the local netball competition. There are two junior teams: Spinners and Sparklers, whose teams are composed of Spinifex students, and there are five senior teams: Socialites, Stingers, Scorchers, Sapphires, and Strikers. The senior teams are composed primarily of Spinifex teachers and past-Spinifex students.

Friendly games across all sports are conducted against Good Shepard Catholic College and Cloncurry State High School. Rivalry between the three schools is increasingly competitive.

=== Music ===
Spinifex State College has a combined campus concert band. The students in this band range from intermediate to experienced levels. The band placed 2nd at the regional Eisteddfod in 2005, placed 3rd in 2006, and 3rd in 2007. In 2005, the band received a Silver Award for FanFare – a prestigious school band competition held throughout Queensland. The school also has a jazz band, that formed in 2005 and the following year took 4th place at the North-West Queensland regional Eisteddfod. The jazz band reformed at the beginning of 2007 to form the Mount Isa Stage Band.. Currently, the Spinifex State College Concert Band has around 40 members and performs at various school events.

=== Drama ===
Spinifex State College has a strong arts program and is well known for its stage musicals which are produced every two years. In 2003 they performed the hit musical Back to the 80s. 2005 saw the school perform another hit musical, again a comedy, Smithy. The story of Smithy follows a troublesome youth who joins the school play, Romeo and Juliet, and tries his luck with the hottest girl around. The school musical was postponed until 2008, in order to accommodate for the new music teacher and the new drama teacher. The school musical for 2008 was called Disco Inferno, a 70's themed comedy. It premiered on the 18th and 19 July at the Mount Isa Civic Center. 2010 saw the production of the world famous musical "Grease", again performed at the Mount Isa Civic Center to a positive audience reception. The musical was postponed, this time for three years. In 2014, Spinifex State College performed the hit "High School Musical" at the Mount Isa Civic Center which was met with acclaim by audiences. In 2016, Spinifex performed “Popstars”, a jukebox musical based on the drama surrounding a talent contest. In 2018, they staged “Rock of Ages”, yet another jukebox musical but one with Hollywood and Broadway ties. This most recent musical was extremely popular, and students and staff alike are anxious to perform again soon.

=== Other ===
- Gifted and Talented Programs – including a program for Year 7 students in the areas of Maths, Science, The Arts and English
- Magnetic Island Leadership and Personal Development camp – Year 11
- Year 12 Leadership Camp – Captains and School Council Members
- Senior Tutorial Classes – Years 10–12
- Junior after-school tutorials – Years 7–9
- School-Based Apprenticeships/Traineeships – Years 10–12
- Structured Industry Placements – Years 10–12 – over 300 placements
- Instrumental Music Program – Years 7–12
- Debating – Years 7–12
- North West Queensland Representative Sports – Years 7–12
- James Cook University Trip – Year 12
- Year 7/8–12 Transition Days
- Xstrata Bursaries – Years 11–12
- Siemens Science Summer School – Years 10–12
