= Electoral district of Traeger =

State electoral district of Queensland, Australia

Traeger Queensland—Legislative Assembly
- Map of the electoral district of Traeger, 2017
- State: Queensland
- Dates current: 2017–present
- MP: Robbie Katter
- Party: Katter's Australian
- Namesake: Alfred Traeger
- Electors: 26,386 (2020)
- Area: 428,911 km^{2} (165,603.5 sq mi)
- Demographic: Remote and rural
- Coordinates: 19.8326°S 142.6477°E
Electorates around Traeger:
Gulf of Carpentaria	Gulf of Carpentaria	Cook; Hill
Northern Territory	Traeger	Hinchinbrook; Thuringowa
Northern Territory	Gregory	Burdekin

Traeger is an electoral district of the Legislative Assembly in the Australian state of Queensland. It was created in the 2017 redistribution, and was named after Alfred Traeger, inventor of the pedal-powered radio, which was a significant contribution to people living in remote and rural communities in Queensland, such as those within Traeger.

It takes in most of the urbanised portions of the abolished districts of Mount Isa and Dalrymple. It includes the local government areas of Burke, Doomadgee, Carpentaria, Croydon, Etheridge, Charters Towers, Mount Isa, Cloncurry, McKinlay, Richmond and Flinders.

From results of the previous 2015 election, Traeger was estimated to be a safe seat for the Katter's Australian Party with a margin of 16.1%.

Robbie Katter, the last member for Mount Isa and the Queensland leader of Katter's Australian Party, opted to follow most of his constituents into Traeger. He won the seat with an increased majority.

== Members for Traeger ==
Member	Party	Term
Robbie Katter	Katter's Australian	2017–present

== Election results ==
2024 Queensland state election: Traeger
Party	Candidate	Votes	%	±%
Katter's Australian	Robbie Katter	9,831	49.3	−9.5
Liberal National	Yvonne Tunney	5,039	25.3	+9.2
Labor	Georgia Heath	3,024	15.2	−5.4
One Nation	Peter Rawle	1,349	6.8	+6.8
Greens	Louise Raynaud	689	3.4	+1.2
Total formal votes		19,932	96.6	
Informal votes		700	3.4	
Turnout		20,632		
Two-candidate-preferred result
Katter's Australian	Robbie Katter	12,703	63.7	−11.0
Liberal National	Yvonne Tunney	7,229	36.3	+11.0
Katter's Australian hold		Swing	-11.0	

== See also ==
- Electoral districts of Queensland
- Members of the Queensland Legislative Assembly by year
- Category:Members of the Queensland Legislative Assembly by name
