= Lake Moondarra =

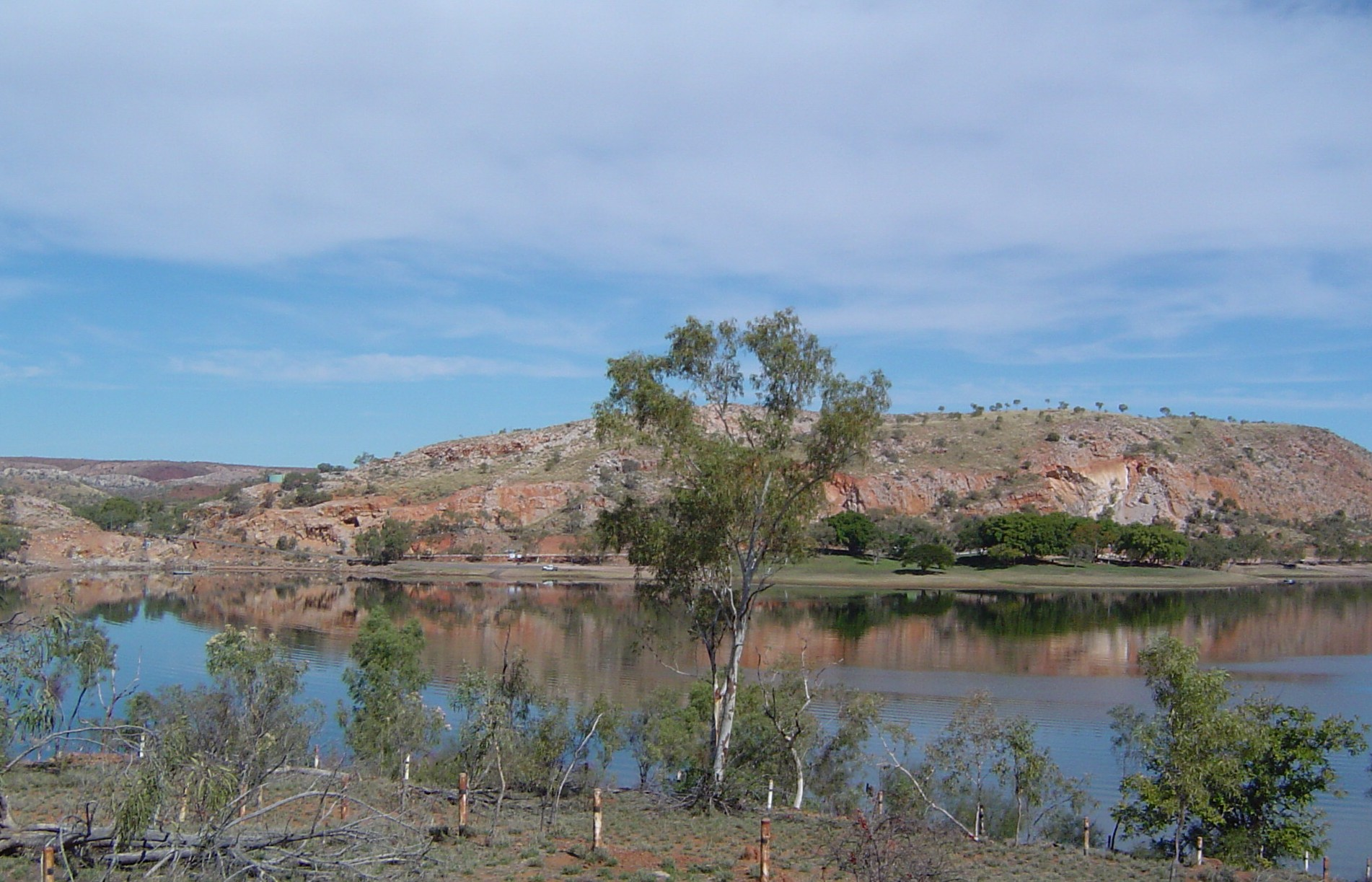

- Location of the dam and reservoir in Queensland
- Interactive map of Lake Moondarra
- Official name: Leichhardt River Dam
- Country: Australia
- Location: Mount Isa, north-west Queensland
- Coordinates: 20°34′53″S 139°34′25″E
- Purpose: Potable water supply; Industrial water supply; Recreation
- Status: Operational
- Construction began: 1956
- Opening date: 6 November 1958
- Construction cost: A£1.7 million
- Built by: Utah Constructions; Thiess Brothers
- Owner: Mount Isa Mines
- Operator: Mount Isa Water Supply Board

Dam and spillways
- Type of dam: Rock-fill dam
- Impounds: Leichhardt River
- Height (foundation): 28 m (92 ft)
- Length: 259 m (850 ft)
- Dam volume: 153×10^{3} m^{3} (5.4×10^{6} cu ft)
- Spillways: 1
- Spillway type: Uncontrolled
- Spillway length: 77 m (253 ft)
- Spillway capacity: 3,539 m^{3}/s (125,000 cu ft/s)

Reservoir
- Creates: Lake Moondarra
- Total capacity: 107,000 ML (87,000 acre⋅ft)
- Catchment area: 1,140 km^{2} (440 sq mi)
- Surface area: 23.75 km^{2} (9.17 sq mi)
- Maximum water depth: 11 m (36 ft)
- Normal elevation: 323 m (1,060 ft) AHD

Lake Moondarra is an impounded reservoir formed by the Leichhardt River Dam, a concrete-faced rock-filled embankment dam across the Leichhardt River, located near Mount Isa in north-west Queensland, Australia. The dam was built in 1958 for the supply of potable water to the town of Mount Isa, 16 kilometres (9.9 mi) upstream, and water supply for the adjacent Mount Isa Mines (MIM) mining lease. Lake Moondarra is used for recreation purposes and includes picnic areas, pontoons, a ski jump, and water sports facilities. The lake is popular with birdwatchers, sailors and anglers.

== History ==
Prior to the construction of the dam, the area was the location for one of Australia's largest stone axe quarries. The axes were traded amongst Indigenous Australians across distances up to 1,000 kilometres (620 mi).

Construction of the Leichhardt River Dam began in 1956, was completed on 6 November 1958, and cost A£1.7 million. The dam was built for MIM and, at the time, was the largest water scheme in Australia financed by private enterprise. The original construction was started by the American Utah Construction Company and Thiess Brothers completed the project.

The dam is 28 metres (92 ft) high, 259 metres (850 ft) long, and holds back 107,000 megalitres (87,000 acre⋅ft) when at full capacity. The impounded reservoir covers 23.75 square kilometres (9.17 sq mi) and draws from a catchment area of 1,140 square kilometres (440 sq mi). In 1971, the uncontrolled spillway was raised 1.52 metres (5 ft 0 in) to its present height of 323 m (1,060 ft) AHD.

On 20 October 1962, the reservoir was officially gazetted as Lake Moondarra after a 1961 competition was won by a Mount Isa local, Danny Driscoll. The Aboriginal word moondarra means "plenty of rain" and also "thunder".

== Recreation ==
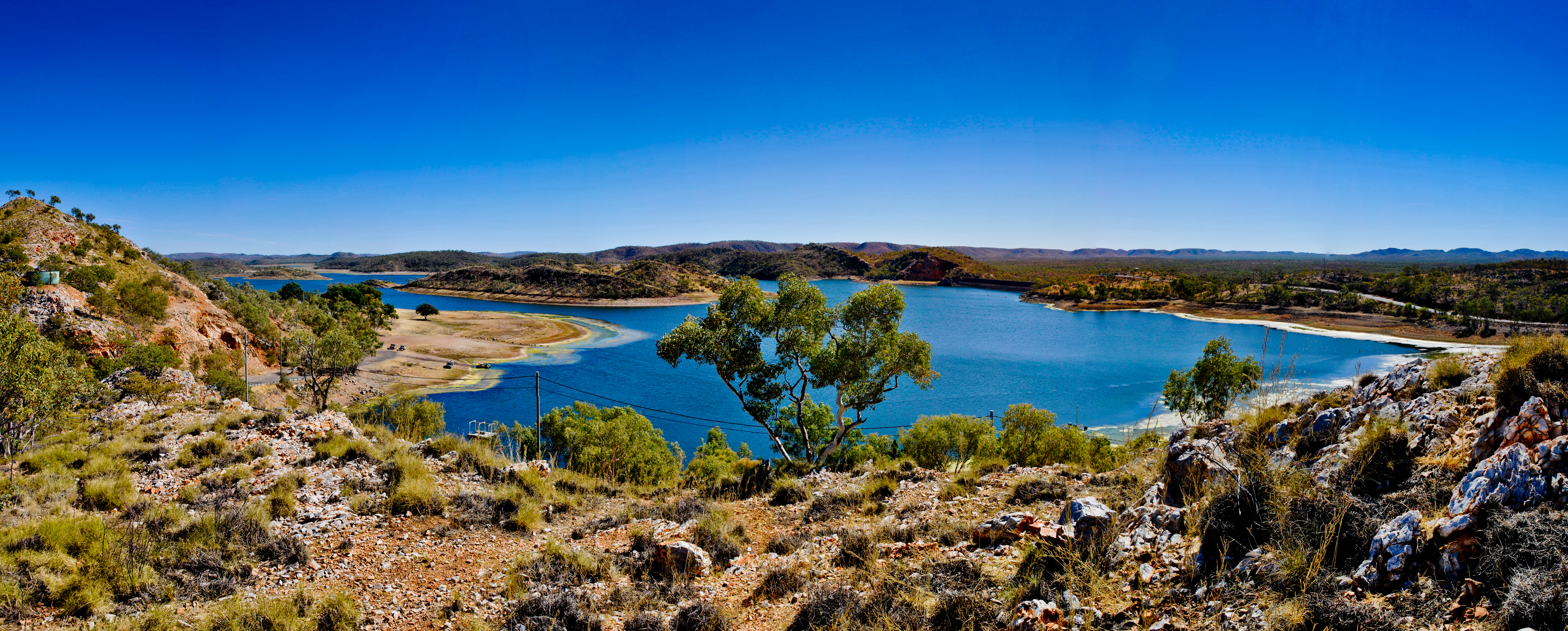
Panorama of the lake from the lookout above Transport Bay, in 2014.

Transport Bay is a man-made beach on the lake, so named because sand was deposited on the banks of the lake by MIM Holdings' trucks.

=== Fish stocking ===
The dam is stocked with approximately 10,000 fingerlings annually for recreational fishing. It is stocked with barramundi and sooty grunter. 22 different freshwater species inhabit the dam.

The Lake Moondarra Fishing Classic was inaugurated in 1999.

=== Pest weed control ===
In 1984, a species of weevil was successfully used as a biological pest control to contain a proliferation of the weed Salvinia molesta in the lake. The first releases were made in 1980 and the weevil destroyed tens of thousands of tonnes of weed.

== See also ==
- List of reservoirs and dams in Australia
  - East Leichhardt Dam
  - Lake Julius
  - Rifle Creek Dam
