= Lake Moondarra Fishing Classic =

Annual Australian fishing tournament

The Lake Moondarra Fishing Classic is an annual fishing tournament held at Lake Moondarra in Mount Isa, Queensland, Australia. It is held in the last full weekend of October starting on the Friday afternoon and concluding on Sunday.

The event is hosted by the Mount Isa Fish Stocking Group, a non-profit volunteer organisation whose primary focus is the development of fresh water recreational fishery in the lakes around Mount Isa.

Funds raised from the event are used to stock the lakes with barramundi and sooty grunter fingerlings.

== History ==
The Lake Moondarra Fishing Classic was spawned by the Mount Isa Fish Stocking Group to encourage keen anglers and the community to utilize the local lakes for recreational and entertainment purposes.

The first competition was held on the weekend of 12 December 1999. Four hundred and fifty seven (457) competitors and 208 fish weighed in with the biggest being a 3.62 kilogram catfish - the current record is a 26 kilogram barramundi.

The event was moved to October following year.

== Categories ==
- Junior Male Secret Weight Runner Up
- Junior Male Secret Weight Winner
- Junior Female Secret Weight Runner Up
- Junior Female Secret Weight Winner
- Senior Male Secret Weight Runner Up
- Senior Male Secret Weight Winner
- Senior Female Secret Weight Runner Up
- Senior Female Secret Weight Winner
- Mystery Weight Archer Fish
- Mystery Weight Barra
- Mystery Weight Catfish
- Mystery Weight Longtom
- Mystery Weight Sleepy Cod
- Mystery Weight Sooty Grunter
- Junior Overall Mystery Weight
