= Bower Bird Battery =

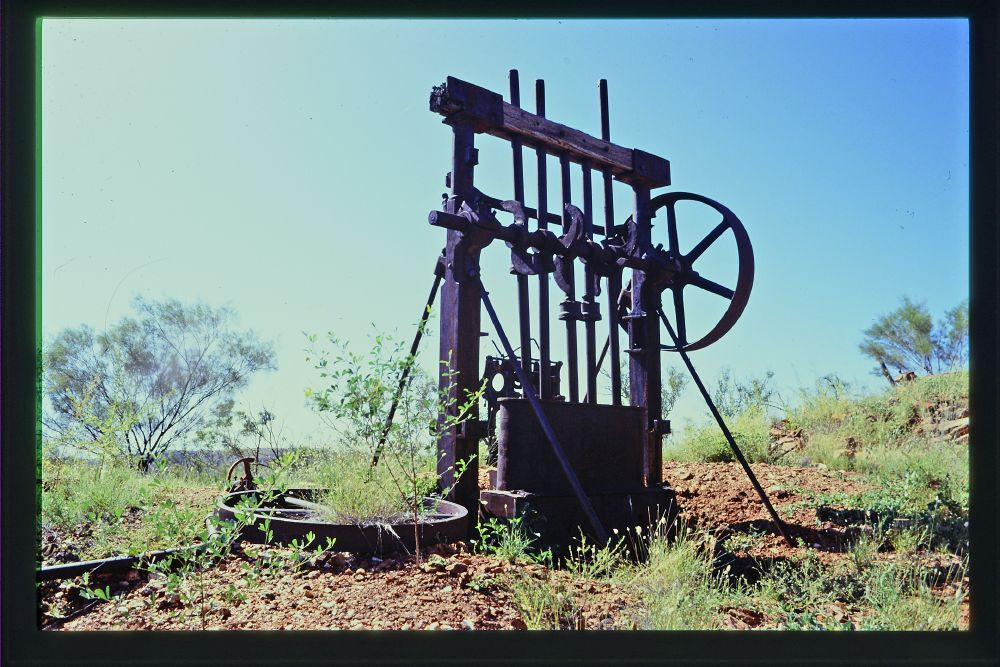
- Ruins of the Bower Bird Battery, 1993

- Location within Queensland Location within Australia
- 20.0969°S 139.6975°E
- Location: Mount Isa Mining District, Mount Isa, City of Mount Isa, Queensland, Australia

History
- Design period: 1870s–1890s (late 19th century)
- Built: c. 1895–c. 1909

Queensland Heritage Register
- Official name: Bower Bird Battery
- Type: state heritage (archaeological)
- Designated: 13 December 2002
- Reference no.: 601863
- Significant period: 1873, c. 1895 (fabric); 1895–c. 1909 (historical)
- Significant components: forge/blacksmithy, mullock heap, mine – open cut, wall/s, battery/crusher/stamper/jaw breaker, terracing, machinery/plant/equipment – mining/mineral processing

Bower Bird Battery is a heritage-listed former stamper battery in the Mount Isa Mining District, Mount Isa, City of Mount Isa, Queensland, Australia. It was built from c. 1895 to c. 1909. It was added to the Queensland Heritage Register on 13 December 2002.

== History ==
The Bower Bird Goldfield was proclaimed on 5 September 1895 – and incorporated into the Cloncurry Gold and Mineral Field on 9 January 1913. The area encompassing the Bower Bird workings generally consists of rugged ranges of quartzite cut by streams draining into the north flowing Leichhardt River.

Gold had been found at Bower Bird between 1870 and 1872. Fossickers (notably Bill McPhail) were prospecting the area before 1880 and Robert Logan Jack's 1882 maps show a "Bower Bird Goldfield" although no official returns were recorded until 1893. The first reef located was the Victoria and in 1884 it also provided the first stone for crushing which yielded 103 ounces (2,900 g) of gold from 17.2 long tons (17.5 t) of ore, which was carted some distance to the Soldier's Cap (Mount Freda) battery near Cloncurry for crushing.

The Bower Bird Battery of five stamps, four berdans, and concentrator was probably erected in 1895, after being relocated from other places. The stamper was already over 20 years old, having been manufactured in 1873. Between 1895 and 1897 the field's main producer the Victoria reef officially produced 930 long tons (940 t) of ore yielding 811 ounces (23,000 g) of gold before being abandoned, possibly due to drought. It is not known whether the battery was also abandoned at this time or continued processing ore from other nearby reefs, such as the Lily of the Valley, Bertha and Two Mile, which yielded patches of alluvial gold. After 1900, a small quantity of ore was carted from shafts on May Downs station to the Bower Bird battery for crushing, with unknown results.

By about 1895 the township, which was some distance from the battery consisted, of three stores, two hotels and a post office which closed in 1901.

In January 1904 it was reported in Cloncurry that the battery shed had burnt down. Although there is no record, the battery may have been rebuilt because in 1909 the Victoria Reef was reopened and produced a further 8.1 long tons (8.2 t) of ore yielding 11.5 ounces (330 g) of gold. Hooper records that the battery was renovated in 1908 as a five head battery with a Brown and Stanfield converter to treat ore from the Victory mine. A Commonwealth Government geologist, C.S. Honman, inspected the field in 1937 but did not report on the battery.

== Description ==
The place, which is situated on a small flat on the side of a spinifex covered hill, contains an almost intact five head stamp battery and the remnants of a small battery shed. A large number of early surface workings extend along the line of reef on which the battery stands. A camp site is situated about 100 metres (330 ft) east of the battery. Immediately south and west of the stamp battery are several earth benches of the former battery shed. A number of non-insitu items of plant are located in the immediate vicinity including two berdan pans, a stamper belt wheel, a cog wheel, a small set of scales, a forge constructed from half of a ship's tank, and the base of a grinding pan. An area of confused diggings and old mullock dumps extends north of the stamps. Immediately east is a shallow open cut and associated shallow workings.

The camp site comprises two low enclosed wall structures of crude stone construction each with an attached external fireplace or forge. A stone forge and other low rock walls are also evident. The construction suggests that the camp was of canvas and/or bough shelters for which the stonework formed low walls. Recent (1994) exploration drill pad bulldozing between the camp and stamp battery has destroyed further evidence of the camp.

The surviving plant includes:

- Five-head stamp battery and frame – P.N.Russell & Co Engineers Sydney 1873 No 160
- 2 berdan pans
- Grinding pan base – no brand

== Heritage listing ==
Bower Bird Battery was listed on the Queensland Heritage Register on 13 December 2002 having satisfied the following criteria.

The place is important in demonstrating the evolution or pattern of Queensland's history.

Bower Bird Creek Battery is important in demonstrating the evolution of Queensland's early gold mining industry and is an example of the transitory settlements that were a result gold prospecting all over Queensland.

The place demonstrates rare, uncommon or endangered aspects of Queensland's cultural heritage.

The place is significant as a now rare example of a once representative gold battery and mining camp in a remote and semi-arid environment.

The place has potential to yield information that will contribute to an understanding of Queensland's history.

The surrounding area contains numerous early workings and crude stone camp sites, which are comparatively undisturbed and may date from the 1890s occupation of the area by miners.

The place is important in demonstrating the principal characteristics of a particular class of cultural places.

The five head stamp battery and frame was built by P N Russell and Co., Engineers of Sydney in 1873 and this is the earliest manufacture date on recorded batteries in North Queensland. It is the only intact stamp battery remaining in Western and North-West Queensland and may be the earliest surviving in Queensland.
