= Mount Isa Mine Early Infrastructure =

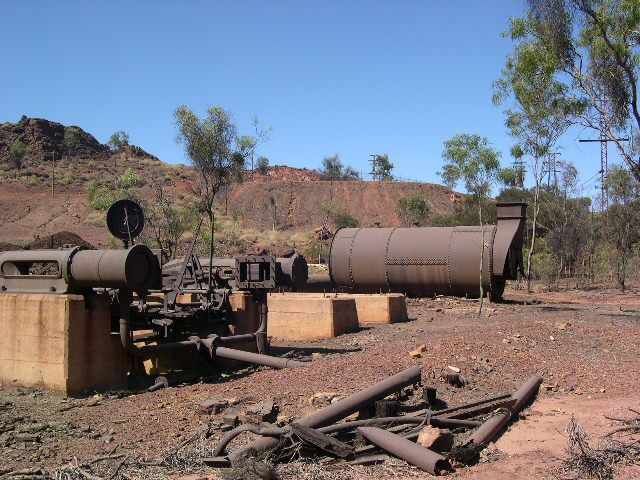
- Lawlor Shaft and Winding Plant, 2003

- Location within Queensland Location within Australia
- 20.7335°S 139.4768°E
- Location: on Mount Isa Mine Lease, Mount Isa (locality), City of Mount Isa, Queensland, Australia

History
- Design period: 1919–1930s (interwar period)
- Built: 1924–c. 1963

Queensland Heritage Register
- Official name: Mount Isa Mine Early Infrastructure, Lawlor Shaft and Winding Plant, Mount Isa Mine Experimental Dam, Mount Isa Mine Power Station
- Type: state heritage (built, archaeological)
- Designated: 25 February 2005
- Reference no.: 601182
- Significant period: 1920s–c. 1963 (fabric)
- Significant components: engine/generator shed/room / power supply, headframe, mullock heap, mounting block/stand, machinery/plant/equipment – mining/mineral processing, weir, shaft

Mount Isa Mine Early Infrastructure is a heritage-listed group of mining infrastructure on the Mount Isa Mine Lease, Mount Isa, City of Mount Isa, Queensland, Australia. They comprise the Lawlor Shaft & Winding Plant, the Urquhart Shaft and Headframe, the Mount Isa Mine Experimental Dam, and the Mount Isa Mine Power Station. They were built from 1924 to c. 1963. They were added to the Queensland Heritage Register on 25 February 2005.

== History ==
John Campbell Miles discovered the ores of Mount Isa as lead outcrops early in 1923. Such a late find on a mineral field closely prospected for nearly sixty years was probably due to the fact that most Queensland prospectors were looking for copper or gold and lead mining was an alien tradition. However, while the discovery was first acknowledged in 1923, it is not improbable that the Mount Isa deposits were long known and ignored.

By the end of 1923, 118 leases had been pegged on the Mount Isa field and of these William Henry Corbould, formerly of the Mount Elliott Company at Selwyn, acquired 51 leases. In January 1924, Corbould's Mount Isa Mining Company was registered in New South Wales. Soon after two other companies were floated - Mount Isa Silver-Lead Proprietary and Mount Isa South, but by December 1925 both had been bought by Mount Isa Mines in a coup unprecedented in Australian mining - a single company held virtually the entire mineralised area of what promised to be a major field.

Support for the new mining venture came from the Queensland Labor Government which gave the government geologist, EC Saint-Smith, permission to act as general manager at Mount Isa for six months to August 1924, and in September the Queensland Geological Survey undertook Australia's first aerial photographic survey for geological purposes over six square miles at Mount Isa. In October 1925 the Queensland Legislative Assembly passed the Duchess to Mount Isa Railway Act.

During 1924 the Mount Isa Mines sank thirty-three shafts and realised that enormous capital would be required. William Corbould visited London regularly between 1924 and 1927 trying to raise capital. In June 1927 the Russo-Asiatic Consolidated Company chaired by Leslie Urquhart, took control of operation and development of Mount Isa. Corbould resigned but retained a non-voting seat as Honorary Advisory Director in London.

On 7 June 1926 the company announced a major reconstruction scheme. The scheme, if successful would provide Russo-Asiatic with a working capital of £860,000 for its activities outside Russia. The announcement of the "no capital" restructuring arrangements for Mount Isa saw an increase in the value of Russo Asiatic and a scramble to purchase Mount Isa shares. The scheme commanded considerable attention in the London Press with the Financial Times remarking that the "no capital reorganisation" scheme was proving successful because it appeared to encourage the Queensland Government to give its assurance that the government "was anxious and willing to assist the enterprise."

The resources of Russo-Asiatic, acquired through the restructuring assisted Mount Isa's development. The New York firm of HH Knox and JH Allen produced plans for exploration and development of the Black Star lode and devised a treatment process. In January 1928 Urquhart visited Mount Isa to inspect all-embracing plans for a major dam and pipeline, an employee housing program, and a development schedule for mining, milling and treatment. Knox arrived at Mount Isa in April to design the treatment plan and was followed by fellow American engineers, CA Mitke and JM Callow.

=== Lawlor Shaft and Winding Plant (1920s) ===
Robert Lawlor held the 2.5 hectares (6.2 acres) Crystal Lease at Top Camp on the new Mount Isa field when the government geologist, EC Saint-Smith, inspected the area in September 1923. This lease was consolidated into Mount Isa Mines holdings by the end of 1924 but Lawlor's Shaft remained as the major access point to ores in the Rio Grande lode during the exploration and ore proving phase (1925–29). The headframe and ancillary buildings were featured in a photograph in the Queensland Government Mining Journal, 15 August 1929.

In 1930 the Rio Grande mine was described as being served by the three compartment vertical Lawlor Shaft, from which, at a depth of 54.4 metres (178 ft), a crosscut in the hanging wall cuts through the lode of sulphide ore. Diamond drilling had already proved persistence of the ore to a depth of 305 metres (1,001 ft).

It is not known when the Lawlor Shaft stopped operating but the King's Cross area of the settlement developed nearby and would have constrained mining operations. During the Second World War it was used for copper extraction.

=== Urquhart Shaft and Headframe (1930–31) ===
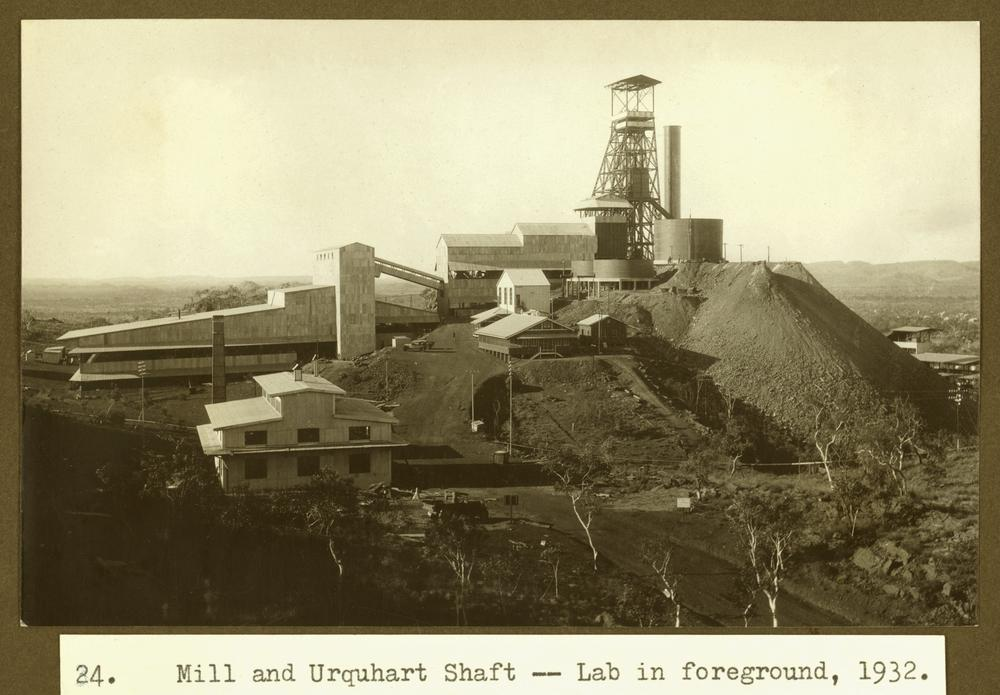
Urquhart Shaft and Headframe, 1932

Before Russo-Asiatic's engineers had visited the field, Corbould and his geologists decided that separate shafts should penetrate each ore-body and a railway should carry the ore from the shaftheads to a central treatment plant in the valley to the north. After a year of diamond drilling however, the ore-bodies were found grouped so closely, that they could be worked cheaply by use of an underground railway linking them to central shafts. Charles Mitke designed the Man and Supply shaft to take all men and materials underground and the Urquhart shaft to hoist the ore and pump the water.

Mitke's plan transferred the main ore shaft and treatment plant to the town side of the long ridge, which divided the struggling township on the river flats from the previous centre of mining activity in the valley. Mitke supervised the sinking of the Urquhart shaft in 1929. Work proceeded simultaneously with the service shaft and development shafts in the Black Rock and Rio Grande ore-bodies, but was not completed at the time of a ministerial inspection in April 1930. The Urquhart shaft had hit an underground reservoir and was never continued to the planned depth.

The Urquhart Shaft and Headframe were erected during 1930–31 and the ore produced had been smelted into lead bullion for shipment overseas by the official opening of the Mount Isa Mines complex by the Hon. Ernest Atherton, Minister for Mines, on 15 June 1931. The Urquhart shaft, which went down vertically for 0.5 miles (0.80 km), carried 3,000,000 long tons (3,000,000 t) of ore and rock each year. It operated for over thirty years until the biggest shaft on the Mount Isa field, then known as the K57 ore shaft, was opened in 1963.

=== Mount Isa Mine Power Station (1931) ===
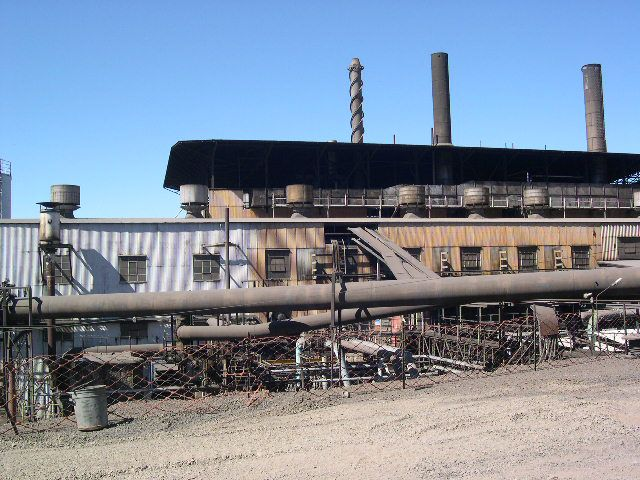
Mount Isa Mine Power Station, from W, 2003

From mid-1927 the technical management of Mount Isa Mine was in the hands of the Urquhart group (formerly known as the Russo-Asiatic Consolidated). With their increased capital they set about developing the "most modern mine of the age." The initial power house of Corbould's company was replaced by the steel framed power station consisting of a coal-fired boiler house and a generator house, designed by JM Callow in 1928 and located at the base of the Mount Isa Mine ridge overlooking the new tent settlement on the bank of the West Leichhardt River. The power station was operational by 1931 and a photograph of it appeared in the Queensland Government Mining Journal on 15 July 1931, which described the Ministerial opening of the new mining plant. It was described as having "twin chimneys rising like black cigars above a roof of dazzling iron".

The powerhouse supplied electricity to the town and its houses as well as to the mine until the opening of the Mica Creek power station. In 1951 the powerhouse was extended to supply the new copper smelter. When the Mica Creek power station came into operation supplying electricity, the mines power station was adapted to supply compressed air for the entire mine operation. It continues to fulfill this function.

=== Mount Isa Mine Experimental Dam (1920s) ===
From March 1923 when JC Miles discovered the lead outcrops of Mount Isa, shortage of water was identified as a "temporary disability" for the new field. Small soaks were opened in the bed of the Leichhardt River at both Top Camp and Lower Camp settlements. This appears to have been the period when the Experimental Dam was constructed, with a weir built at the entrance to a narrow gully, known as Hidden Valley, just south of the mine. The original stone wall of the weir was later raised with a form-cast concrete section. William Corbould of Mount Isa Mines knew that the treatment works would be greedy for water and EHR Greensill, a surveyor, recommended damming the gorge of Rifle Creek, 32 kilometres (20 mi) south of the mine. The Rifle Creek Dam was constructed by mid 1929 and a pipeline laid to Mount Isa, which became operational by 1930. Presumably from this time, the Experimental Dam ceased to function as a water supply augmenting the bores, which had been sunk. It was subsequently used for recreational purposes and there is a photographic record of a swimming carnival there about 1929.

== Description ==
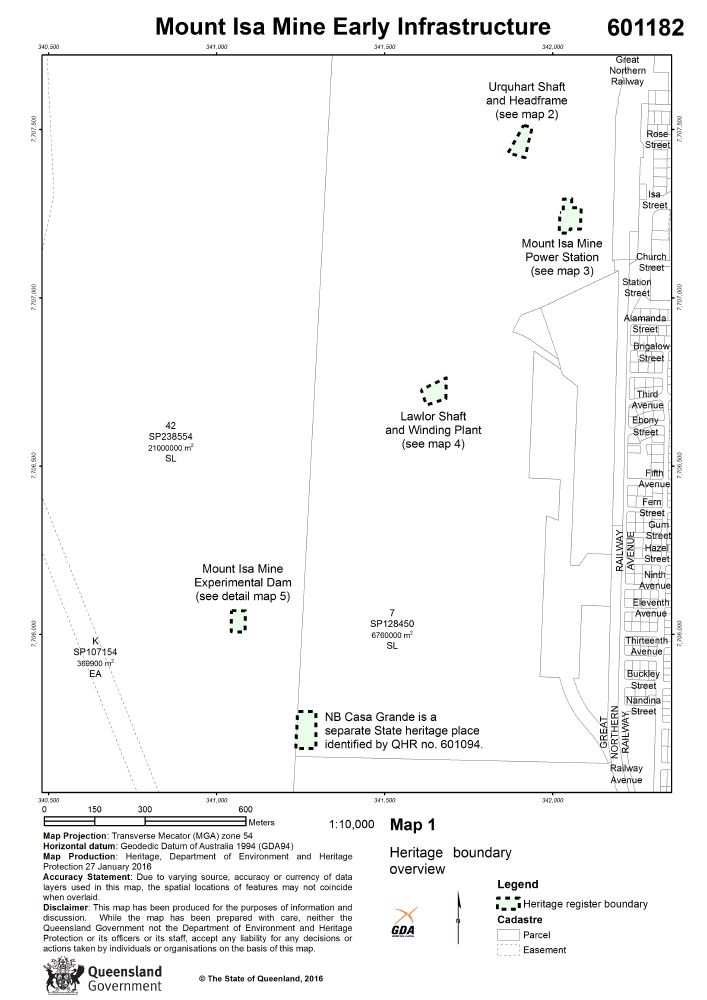
Map of Mount Isa Mine Early Infrastructure

The Mount Isa Mine Early Infrastructure comprises: Lawlor Shaft and Winding Plant; Urquhart Shaft and Headframe; Mount Isa Mine Power Station; and Mount Isa Mine Experimental Dam.

=== Lawlor Shaft and Winding Plant ===
The remaining evidence of the Winding Plant consists of a partly intact two-cylinder steam winding engine without drums, manufactured by May Brothers Engineers of Gawler, South Australia, resting on concrete mounts (20.7325°S 139.4791°E). Adjacent and to the south of the engine are a further two concrete foundations, possibly for an air compressor. A return flue boiler is situated further south in line with the winding engine. The iron chimney of the boiler lies alongside. The entrance to the Lawlor Shaft, which is now secured with a grid, is located east of the winding plant within a wire mesh security fence. There was no apparent evidence of headframes bases near the shaft. Between the shaft and the plant is a low raised earth surface indicating the extent of the winding shed and containing concrete mounts with machinery bolts and the concrete base for an iron chimney. The remnants of a mullock dump are located south of the mine shaft. The place is situated alongside the main mine road and adjacent to the company's former residential and community retail area known as King's Cross.

=== Urquhart Shaft and Headframe ===
An intact steel headframe of asymmetrical design is located over the Urquhart shaft (20.7259°S 139.4816°E). The headframe, occupying a hilltop position, is a community landmark and a symbol of Mount Isa Mines Limited and the City of Mount Isa. Headframe steelwork is attached to concrete foundations. The Urquhart headframe steelwork bears the name of the manufacturer, F Rodingham Iron & Steel Co Ltd., England. The concrete mounts of the original development headframe winding plant survive beneath the main structure. As the former main ore haulage shaft, the headframe is equipped with a large steel ore bin, which emptied directly into a primary crusher. The jaw crusher plant has been removed but the concrete structure of the crusher remains. From here the ore was conveyed to the three No.1 Concentrator mills.

The Urquhart shaft's Uskside Winding Engine, which was housed in a shed immediately to the north of the headframe, has been removed from the site and installed at the "Outback@Isa Explorers Park" tourist facility in the town. The original corrugated iron winding shed which had been replaced by more recent ribbed steel sheets on the former frame and concrete surface, has also been removed from the site.

=== Mount Isa Mine Power Station ===
The mine power station is located at the eastern base of the Urquhart Shaft hill (20.7280°S 139.4830°E). The power station forms a two-level complex comprising two sections, a boiler and furnace house on the eastern side and a turbine-generator powerhouse on the western side. The external appearance of both sections has remained comparatively unchanged since construction although substantial extension and adaptation of internal structure and plant have taken place with the development of the mine. The power station was initially coal-fired. The boiler house now contains natural gas and oil-fired furnaces, and waste-heat boilers which powered compressors to produce compressed air for the entire mine operation The power house which is a long steel framed corrugated iron clad building aligned north south has been substantially renewed and re- equipped since the 1950s. The original central third of the powerhouse remains structurally intact. This section originally housed Nos.1 and 2 turbo-generators. No.3 turbo generator (made in England by The General Electric Co Ltd., Witton, Birmingham) was installed in line north of No.2 in 1936 to replace No.1 generator after it blew up. No.2 generator has since been removed leaving No.3 as the only surviving early generator plant. No.3 plant comprising a General Electric alternator and turbine generator is coupled to a water-tube condenser unit (manufactured by Hick Hargreaves & Co Ltd., Bolton, England) situated beneath. The northern and southern sections of the powerhouse contain compressors installed in the 1950s. Mine power is now drawn from Mica Creek power station.

=== Mount Isa Mine Experimental Dam ===
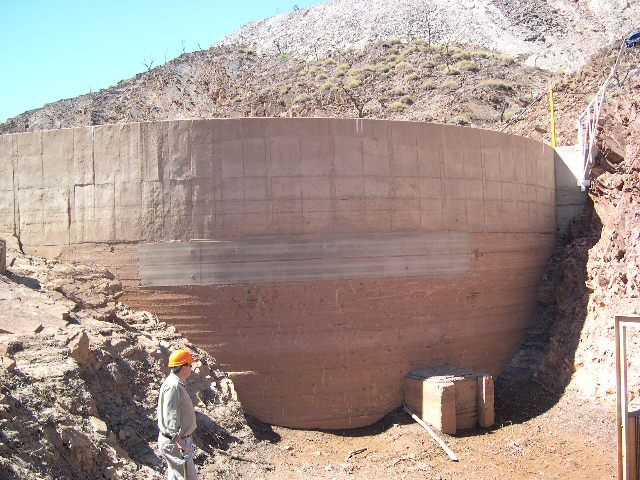
Experimental Dam wall, showing raised area of wall, from W, 2003

The dam is constructed as a curved stone overshot weir, with later form-cast concrete additions above, at the entrance to a narrow gully of Kennedy Creek at the southern end of the Mount Isa Mine tailings and seepage ponds (20.7402°S 139.4720°E). The wall shows the height of original construction and of two subsequent extensions in height and width. The original section is of rendered stone, initially rising an estimated 5 metres (16 ft) above the original valley floor, assuming a current build-up of about 3 metres (9.8 ft) of silt. The 1 metre (3 ft 3 in) deep overflow was subsequently in-filled with roughly rendered stonework. The wall was later raised a further 2 metres (6 ft 7 in) with a form-cast concrete section constructed atop the original structure. The weir now stands 5 metres (16 ft) above the existing upstream silt level and is 23 metres (75 ft) in width.

== Heritage listing ==
Mount Isa Mine Early Infrastructure was listed on the Queensland Heritage Register on 25 February 2005 having satisfied the following criteria.

The place is important in demonstrating the evolution or pattern of Queensland's history.

The Mount Isa Mine Early Infrastructure, established in the 1920s and early 1930s, comprises: Lawlor Shaft and Winding Plant; Urquhart Shaft and Headframe; Mount Isa Mine Power Station; and Mount Isa Mine Experimental Dam. This infrastructure is important in demonstrating the pattern of development of Queensland's history, being surviving evidence of the establishment of large-scale mining at Mount Isa by the Mount Isa Mining Company (later Mount Isa Mines Limited) in the 1920s and early 1930s. The Lawlor Shaft and Winding Plant (1920s) are significant in Queensland's history as the earliest surviving winding plant and shaft at Mount Isa. Because of their direct association with the early development of Mount Isa Mine from 1924 they also have symbolic value. The Urquhart Shaft and Headframe (1930–31) is important in demonstrating the early development and growth of Mount Isa Mine. This headframe, which is an American A-frame rather than the more usual four poster frames of the period, was innovative at the time. The use of this style of headframe popularized the use of America A-frames. The Mount Isa Mine Power Station (1929–31) at the base of the Urquhart shaft hill are significant remains from the initial plant construction period at Mount Isa (1929) made possible by United States capital and engineering design. The place is of historical significance for its long association with power generation for the town of Mount Isa and the mine, prior to construction of Mica Creek power station. The Mount Isa Mine Experimental Dam (1920s) is the earliest surviving construction at Mount Isa and Mount Isa Mine, demonstrating the early development of Queensland's richest mining venture. The silted up dam remains as evidence of the vital need for storing water to enable mining operations to proceed. Its small size and out-of-the-way location on the Mount Isa Mine lease is in juxtaposition to the massive scale of the tailings dams, open cuts and tall chimneys marking the current operations.

The place demonstrates rare, uncommon or endangered aspects of Queensland's cultural heritage.

The mining infrastructure's development was funded through international restructuring rather than profits. At the Lawlor Shaft and Winding Plant, the two-cylinder steam winding engine manufactured by May Brothers of South Australia is an example of recycling Australian-made equipment prior to importing heavy machinery from England. In the Mount Isa Mine Power Station, one pre-Second World War General Electric turbine generator and alternator remains from the original three units.

The place has potential to yield information that will contribute to an understanding of Queensland's history.

Archaeological investigation of the site may reveal further information about the early operations of the Mount Isa Mine. The Lawlor Shaft and Winding Plant also illustrate the continuity of mining activity at Mount Isa and provide opportunities to interpret the area's mining history.

The place has a strong or special association with a particular community or cultural group for social, cultural or spiritual reasons.

The infrastructure has a symbolic association with the work of Mount Isa Mines, which has been important in the Queensland economy since the 1920s. The Urquhart Shaft and Headframe is the largest, most complex and most visible of the two surviving steel headframes at Mount Isa Mine. Silhouetted on the skyline it has been a community landmark for over sixty years.
