= East Leichhardt Dam =

Dam in north western Queensland, Australia

- Location of the dam in Queensland
- Interactive map of East Leichhardt Dam
- Country: Australia
- Location: Mary Kathleen, near Mount Isa, North-west Queensland
- Coordinates: 20°46′42″S 139°47′04″E
- Purpose: Water supply; Recreation
- Status: Operational
- Opening date: 1961
- Built by: Thiess Bros.
- Owner: Located on private property
- Operators: Department of Natural Resources and Water

Dam and spillways
- Type of dam: Rock-fill dam
- Impounds: East Leichhardt River
- Height (foundation): 27 m (89 ft)
- Length: 160 m (520 ft)
- Dam volume: 115×10^{3} m^{3} (4.1×10^{6} cu ft)
- Spillway type: Uncontrolled
- Spillway capacity: 2,430 m^{3}/s (86,000 cu ft/s)

Reservoir
- Creates: Lake Mary Kathleen
- Total capacity: 12,100 ML (9,800 acre⋅ft)
- Catchment area: 550 km^{2} (210 sq mi)
- Surface area: 150 ha (370 acres)
- Normal elevation: 355 m (1,165 ft) AHD

The East Leichhardt Dam is a rock-filled embankment dam built across the East Leichhardt River, located at Mary Kathleen, 25 kilometres (16 mi) east of Mount Isa, in north-western Queensland, Australia. Completed in 1961, the resultant reservoir, Lake Mary Kathleen, was built for the emergency supply of water for the now-closed Mary Kathleen uranium mine. However, Lake Corella was sufficient and the reservoir is now used for recreation purposes, located on private property.

== Overview ==
Access to the dam is via the Barkly Highway, with the dam wall situated approximately 9 kilometres (5.6 mi) south of the highway.

The dam is 27 metres (89 ft) high, 160 metres (520 ft) long, and holds back 12,100 megalitres (9,800 acre⋅ft) of water when at full capacity. The reservoir covers a surface area of 150 hectares (370 acres) that is drawn from a catchment area of 550 square kilometres (210 sq mi).

== See also ==
- List of dams and reservoirs in Australia
