= Leichhardt Falls =

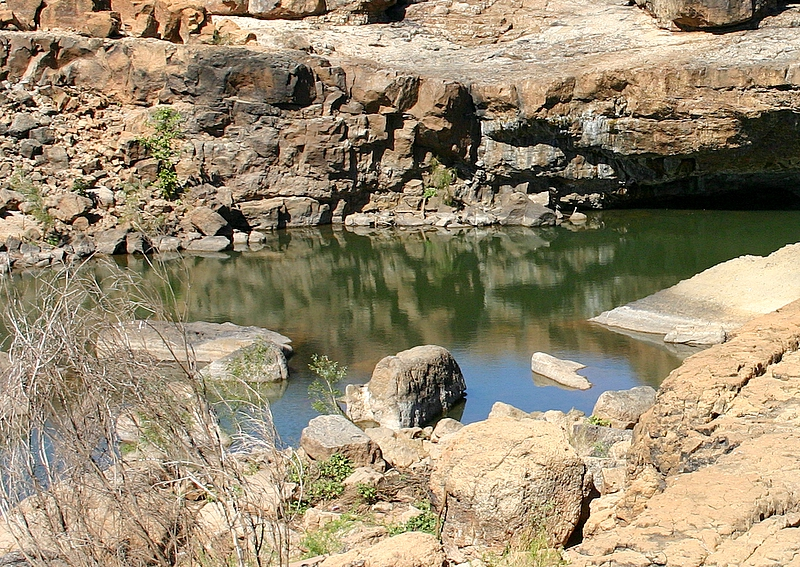
- Leichhardt Falls

- Location within Queensland
- Location: Gulf Country, North West Queensland, Australia
- Coordinates: 18°13′11″S 139°52′44″E
- Type: Plunge
- Watercourse: Leichhardt River

The Leichhardt Falls is a plunge waterfall on the Leichhardt River in the Gulf Country region of North West Queensland, Australia.

== Location and features ==
The falls are located approximately 50 kilometres (31 mi) upstream from the point where the river discharges into the Gulf of Carpentaria. The falls vary in intensity from a raging torrent of water in the wet season to a mere trickle towards the end of the dry season. The falls are not renowned for their height but for their stepped nature and breadth.

The falls and river are named after Ludwig Leichhardt.

== See also ==
- List of waterfalls
- List of waterfalls in Australia
