= Rifle Creek Dam =

Dam in north-western Queensland, Australia

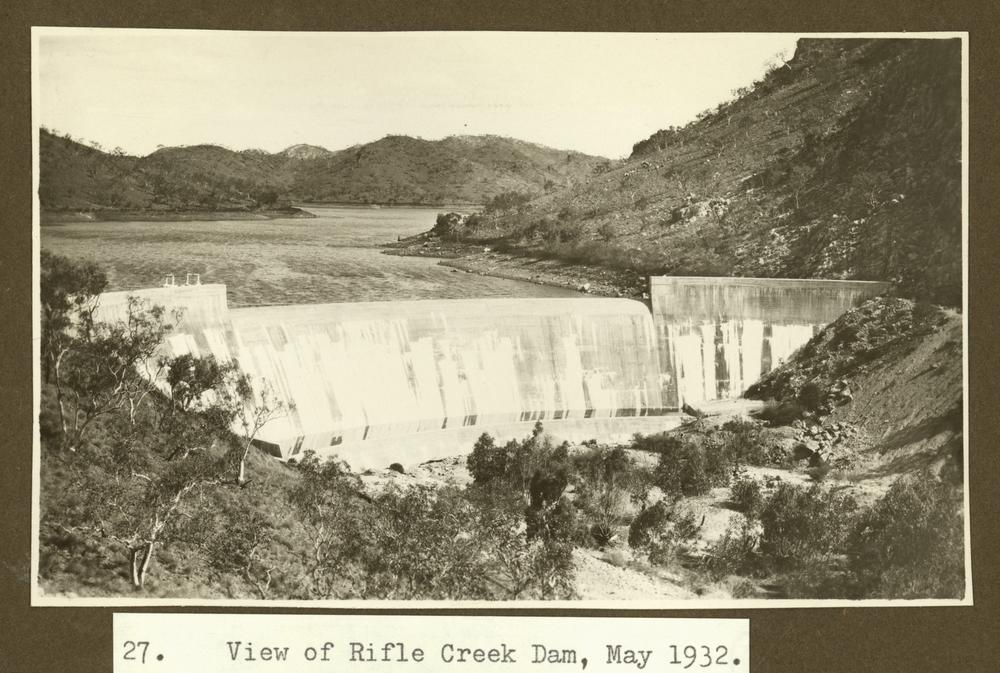
- The dam spillway in 1932 (Source: State Library of Queensland)

- Location of the dam in Queensland
- Interactive map of Rifle Creek Dam
- Country: Australia
- Location: Mount Isa, North-western Queensland
- Coordinates: 20°57′27″S 139°35′24″E
- Purpose: Potable water supply (1929–1958); Industrial use (since 1929)
- Status: Operational
- Opening date: 1929
- Owner: Mount Isa Mines

Dam and spillways
- Type of dam: Arch dam
- Impounds: Rifle Creek
- Height (foundation): 18 m (59 ft)
- Length: 120 m (390 ft)
- Dam volume: 6×10^{3} m^{3} (210×10^{3} cu ft)
- Spillway type: Uncontrolled
- Spillway capacity: 144 m^{3}/s (5,100 cu ft/s)

Reservoir
- Total capacity: 9,490 ML (7,690 acre⋅ft)
- Catchment area: 88 km^{2} (34 sq mi)
- Surface area: 1.5 km^{2} (0.58 sq mi)

The Rifle Creek Dam is a concrete arch dam across the Rifle Creek, located approximately 28 kilometres (17 mi) southeast of Mount Isa, in north-western Queensland, Australia. The dam is owned by Mount Isa Mines and serves as a back-up for the supply of industrial water for the Mount Isa mine.

== Overview ==
Completed in 1929 to replace the earlier Experimental Dam – the first arch dam in Queensland that was completed in September 1925 – the Rifle Creek Dam is 18 metres (59 ft) high and 120 metres (390 ft) long. The resultant 9,490-megalitre (7,690 acre⋅ft) reservoir draw from a catchment area of 88 square kilometres (34 sq mi)

When the dam was built, the capacity of the reservoir was 2,727 megalitres (600×10^{6} imp gal) and its purpose was for the supply of potable water to the town of Mount Isa; as well as industrial use for the mine. The spillway was raised in 1953 to the current capacity. In 1958, Lake Moondarra replaced Rifle Creek Dam as Mount Isa's primary water supply. Rifle Creek Dam now serves as a backup water supply for Mt Isa Mines.

== See also ==
- List of dams and reservoirs in Australia
- Lake Moondarra
