= Mount Isa =

City in Queensland, Australia

- City
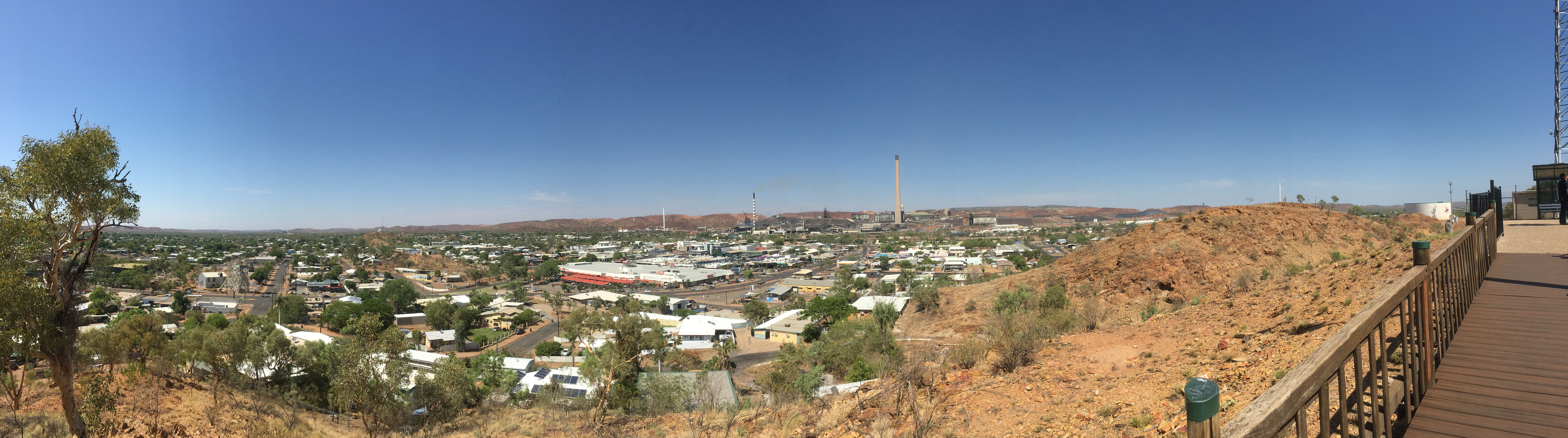
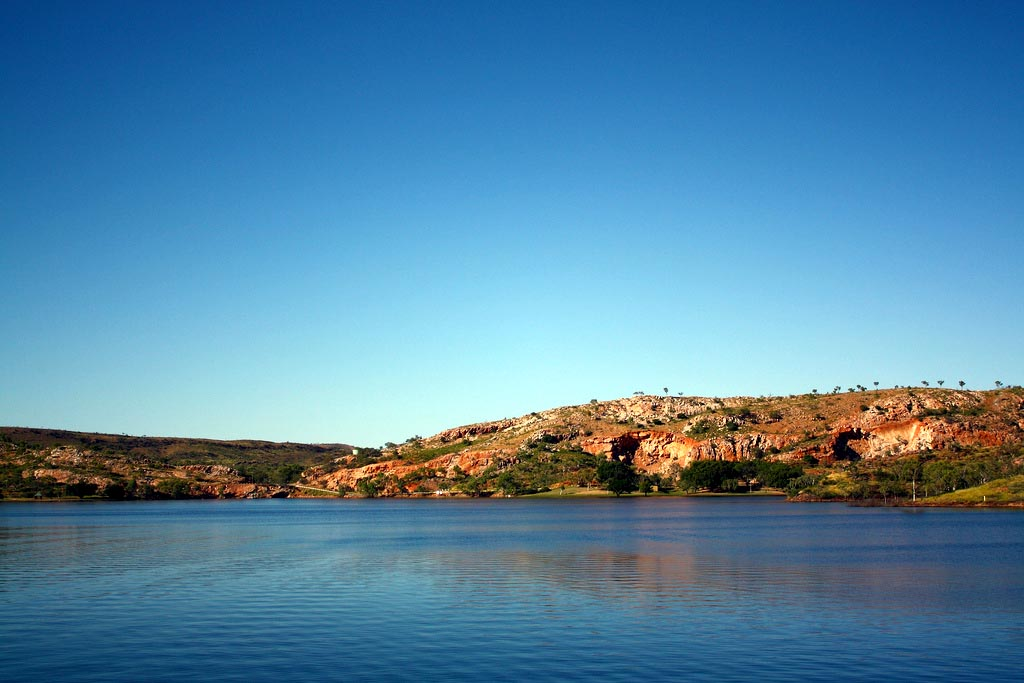
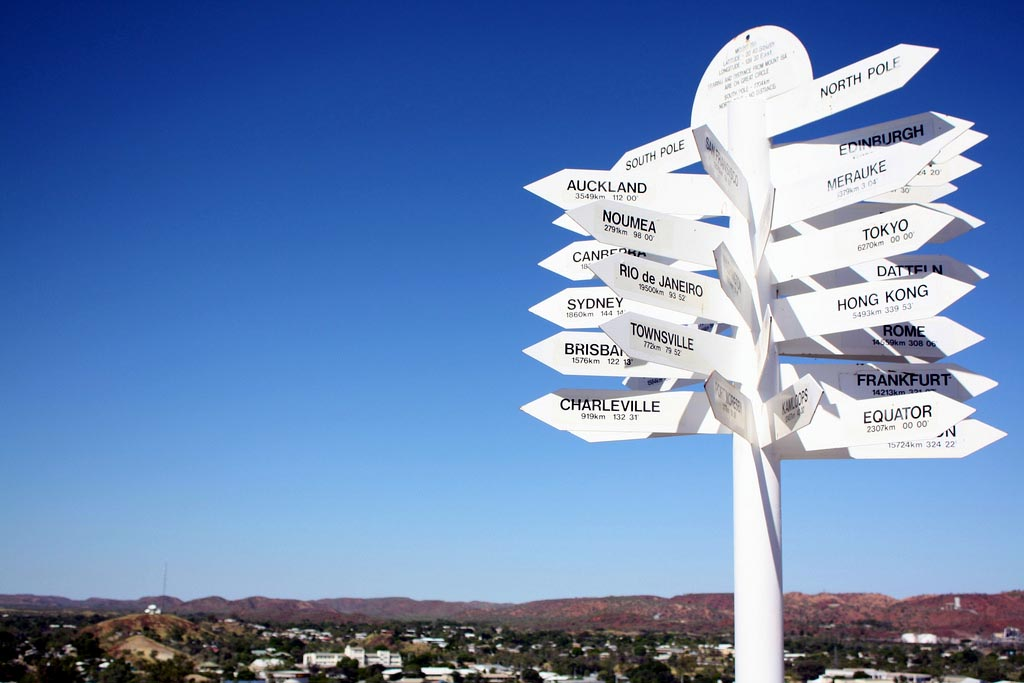
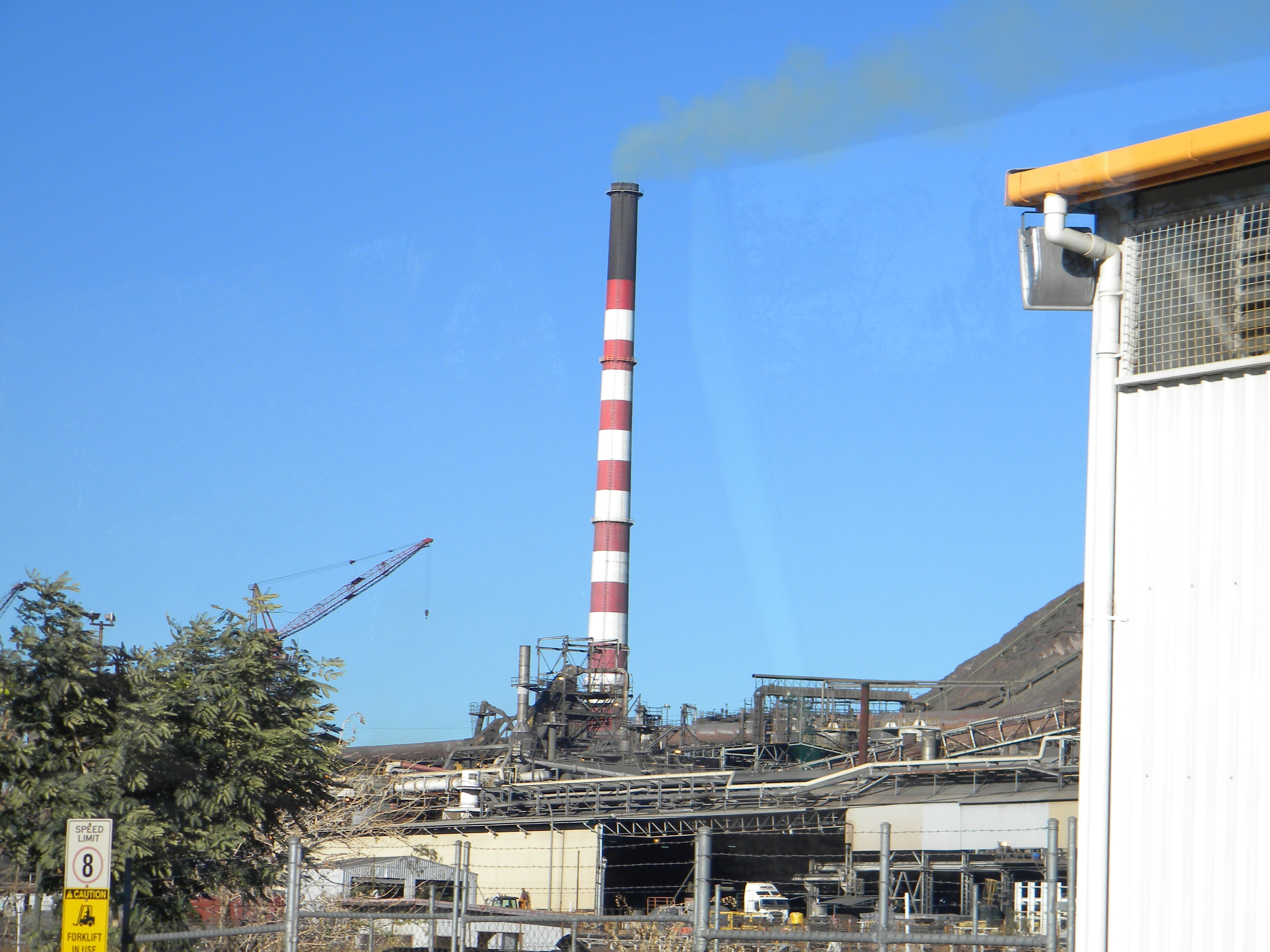
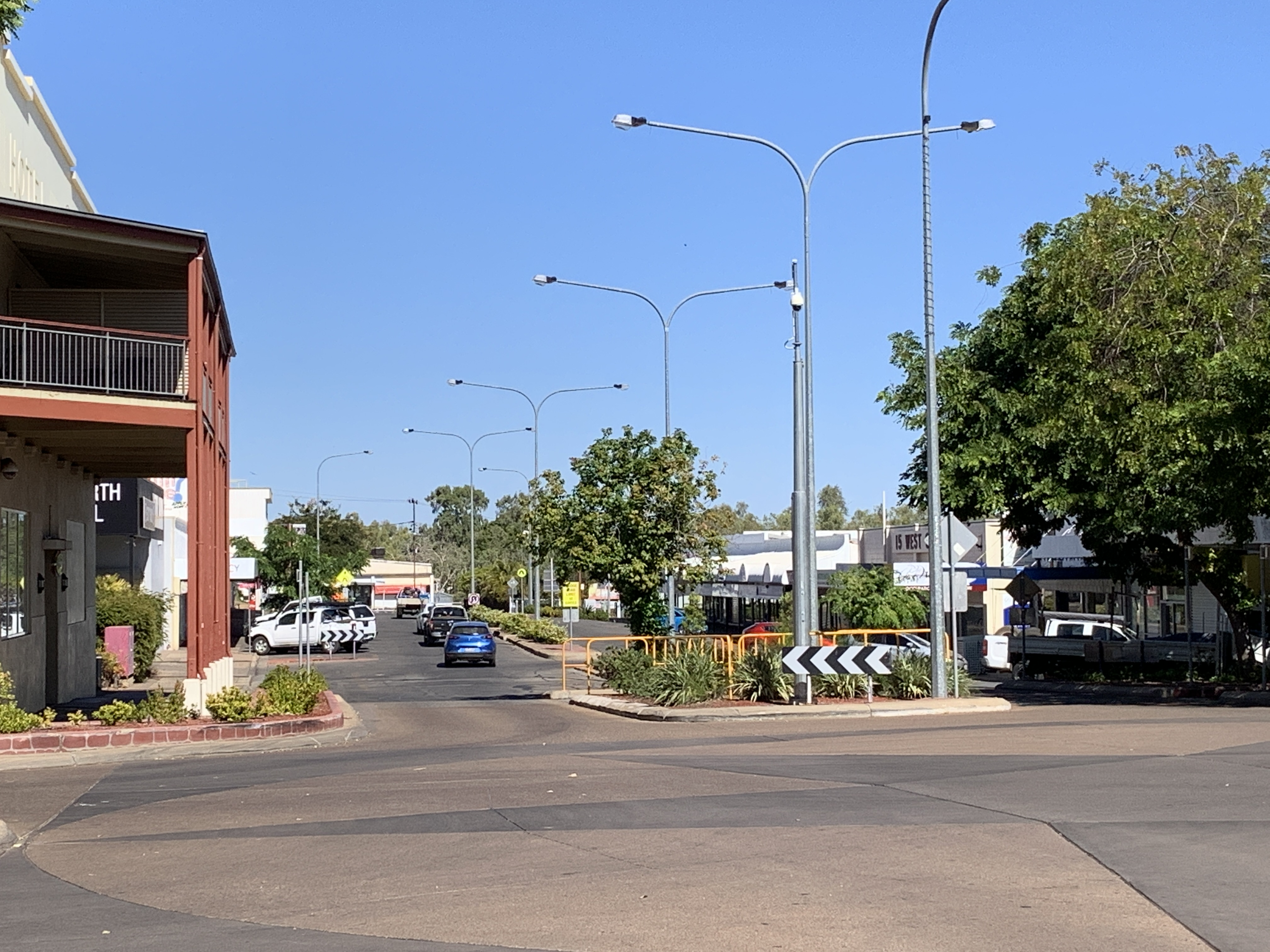
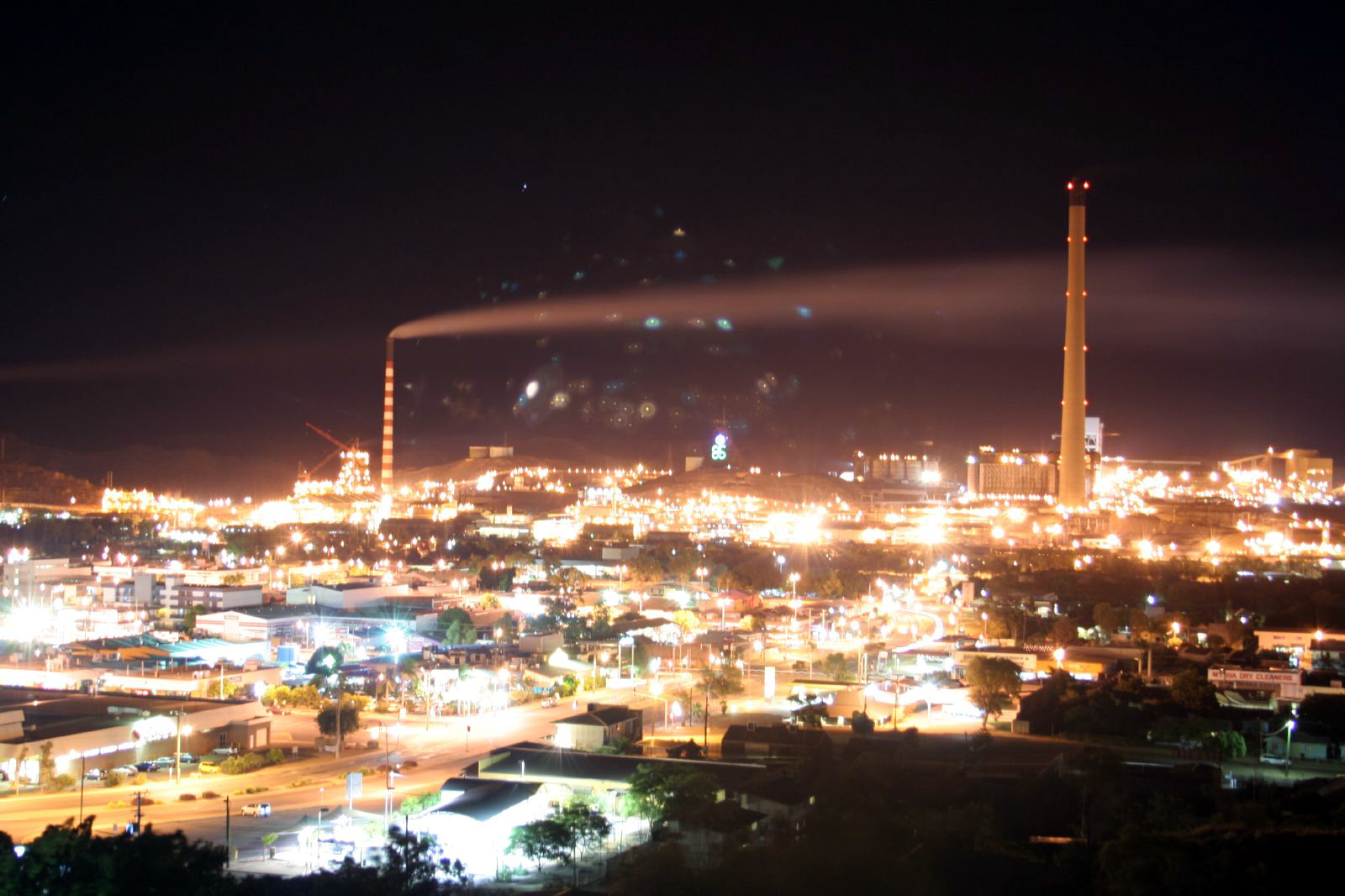
- Top to bottom, left to right: Mount Isa panorama; Lake Moondarra; The Sign, Mount Isa Mines stack, Mount Isa City; Mount Isa at night

- Coordinates: 20.7261°S 139.4938°E
- Country: Australia
- State: Queensland
- LGA: City of Mount Isa
- Location: 904 km (562 mi) W of Townsville; 1,826 km (1,135 mi) NW of Brisbane
- Established: 1923

Government
  - State electorate: Traeger
  - Federal division: Kennedy

Area
  - Total: 68.7 km^{2} (26.5 sq mi)
- Elevation: 356 m (1,168 ft)

Population
  - Total: 18,317 (2021 census)
  - Density: 266.62/km^{2} (690.6/sq mi)
- Time zone: UTC+10:00 (AEST)
- Postcode: 4825
- Mean max temp: 31.9 °C (89.4 °F)
- Mean min temp: 17.3 °C (63.1 °F)
- Annual rainfall: 461.8 mm (18.18 in)

Mount Isa (/ˈaɪzə/ EYE-zə) is a city in the Gulf Country region of Queensland, Australia. It came into existence because of the vast mineral deposits found in the area. Mount Isa Mines (MIM) is one of the most productive mines in world history, based on combined production of lead, silver, copper and zinc.

Before European contact, the Mount Isa region was part of an expansive trade network spanning the entire Lake Eyre Basin and beyond. In particular, it was a valued source of stone for stone tools such as hand axes.

In the 2021 census, the town of Mount Isa had a population of 18,317 people, making Mount Isa the administrative, commercial and industrial centre for the state's vast north-western region. Although situated in an arid area, the artificial Lake Moondarra 19 kilometres (12 mi) north of the city on the Leichhardt River provides both drinking water and an area for watersports, birdwatching and recreation. Locals often refer to Mount Isa as "The Isa".

== Geography ==
The Leichhardt River divides the city into areas known as "mineside" and "townside". Xstrata, the power station and the Airport are on the mineside, whilst the majority of the city, including the CBD and Base Hospital are on the townside. In recent years, population increases associated with the mining boom has increased demand for accommodation and land. The city had spread out, with new suburbs in the south-east and north of the city being planned or developed. Planned expansions can cater for more than 40,000 people.

Mineside

- Happy Valley – includes Happy Valley State School, St Joseph's Catholic Primary School, and Captain James Cook Park
- Kalkadoon – includes Mount Isa Airport and Kalkadoon Park
- Mica Creek – includes CS Energy Mica Creek Power Station
- Miles End – includes Mount Isa Civic Centre and railway station
- Parkside – Mount Isa's largest and oldest suburb. Contains the Irish Club, Parkside Flats complex, and Playway Park
- Soldiers Hill – All streets and parks named after war locations and soldiers, such as Kokoda Road and Gallipoli Park
- Hilton – This neighbourhood is also known as Mineside and is to the west of the railway line as is Mount Isa Mines and the Incitec Pivot Sulphuric Acid plant. It contains some employee housing, particularly for managers and visiting staff from Xstrata, Casa Grande; a white brick mansion built for the visit of Queen Elizabeth II; now used for the annual Casa Grande Ball, and some mine operations.

Townside

- Breakaway – Semi-rural acreages
- Fisher
- Healy – Residential suburb, site of Healy State School
- Lanskey
- Menzies – includes Buchanan Park events complex, Stables and Racecourse, site of Good Shepherd Catholic College
- Mornington
- Mount Isa City – The Central Business District, site of Mount Isa Central State School
- Pioneer – includes a campus of TAFE Queensland North, Spinifex Senior Campus and Ten-Pin Bowling complex, St Kierans Catholic Primary School
- Ryan – mostly industrial, includes army and State Emergency Service barracks, home to one company of the 51st Battalion, Far North Queensland Regiment
- Spreadborough – mostly bushland and light industry. The notable Spreadborough family still resides in the area.
- Sunset – Home to Sunset State Primary School, and some shopping facilities
- The Gap
- Townview – Home to Townview State Primary School
- Winston

== History ==
Long before European contact, the Mount Isa region was a centre for trade and production of dolerite and basalt stone tools and objects. There is evidence of ground-edge stone tools as old as 20,000 years, the earliest in the world, originating from Mount Isa quarries. As of about 1000 years before the present (BP), large, ground-edge stone axes from Mount Isa were particularly prized by the peoples of the Lake Eyre Basin. They were not only valuable tools, but valuable trade items as well, and were often traded for the tobacco plant pituri. Archaeologist Iain Davidson suggests that they were traded partly for reasons unrelated to function, as they were often sought after despite the availability of local resources. Leilira blades were also likely produced in the Mount Isa region, though dating is uncertain.

Rock art is abundant in the region as well. It largely consists of engraved petrographs and free-painted designs; stenciled designs are rare. Rock art in the Mount Isa region varies stylistically site-by-site, and includes circular, geometric, and figurative motifs. One figurative motif particular to the Mount Isa region is the north-west central Queensland anthropomorph figure. They are usually painted one color with an outline in a different color (often red and yellow, respectively) and have distinctive feathered headdresses, no face, and often a third leg which is variously interpreted as either a penis or a lizard's tail. These figures are found near reliable water sources, and may have been used to mark trade and travel paths between regions. Analysis indicates that the ochres used for the paint originate over 100km southeast of Mount Isa. Davidson suggests that, like the Mount Isa stone axes, the ochre was valued for cultural reasons in addition to functional, economic reasons. This, combined with dating marking the anthropomorphs and stone axes as contemporaneous at about 1000 BP, suggests that they were all intertwined components of an extensive trade network stretching across the entire Lake Eyre Basin.

Some rock art depicting figures and hands in the Mount Isa region, including some of the north-west central Queensland anthropomorphs, have only three fingers. The reason is unclear, but it may have a connection to the later observed common practice among Kalkadoon women of amputation of the little finger. Though Mount Isa was a centre for trade, fundamental stylistic differences suggest that there was little to no artistic exchange between the Mount Isa region and surrounding regions, aside from the anthropomorphs.

Mount Isa is located on the traditional land of the Kalkadoon people. The endemic language of the area was Kalkatunga (also known as Kalkadoon, Kalkadunga, Kalkatungu).

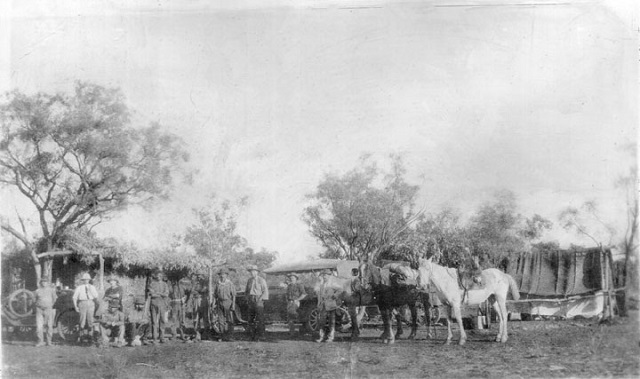
One of the first camps at Mount Isa, 1923

The Kalkadoon people first came into contact with advancing European pastoralists and miners in the mid 1860s, following the Burke and Wills expedition to the Cape York Peninsula in 1861. As settlers and prospectors pressed further into their lands the Kalkadoon set out on one of Australia's most successful guerrilla wars, now known as the Kalkadoon Wars which took place from about 1871 to 1884. Their success continued until at Battle Mountain in 1884, when Kalkadoon people killed five Native Police and a prominent pastoralist. Only 29 Kalkadoon people survived. In response, the Queensland Government sending a large contingent of heavily armed patrols who chased surviving tribe members. It is estimated that 900 Kalkadoon people were killed during this six-year campaign. There is now a memorial near the site of the Black Mountain.

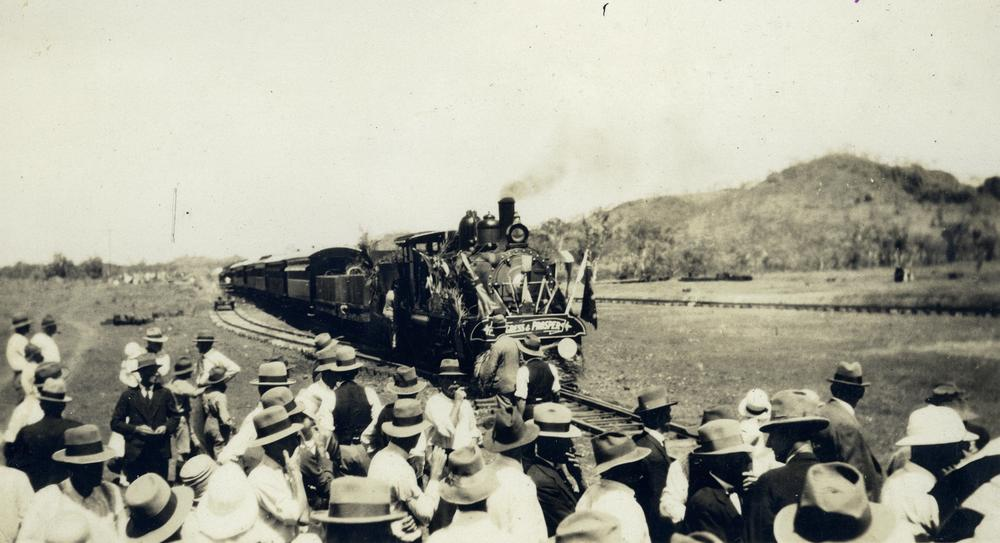
The Attorney General of Queensland, John Mullan, officially opened the railway line on 6 April 1929

In 1923, a lone prospector, John Campbell Miles, stumbled upon one of the world's richest deposits of copper, silver and zinc during an expedition into the Northern Territory. When Miles inspected the yellow-black rocks in a nearby outcrop, they reminded him of the ore found in the Broken Hill mine that he had once worked at. Upon inspection these rocks were weighty and heavily mineralised. A sample sent away to the assayer in Cloncurry confirmed their value. Miles and four farmers staked out the first claims in the area. Taken with friend's stories of the Mount Ida gold mines in Western Australia, Miles decided upon Mount Isa as the name for his new claim.

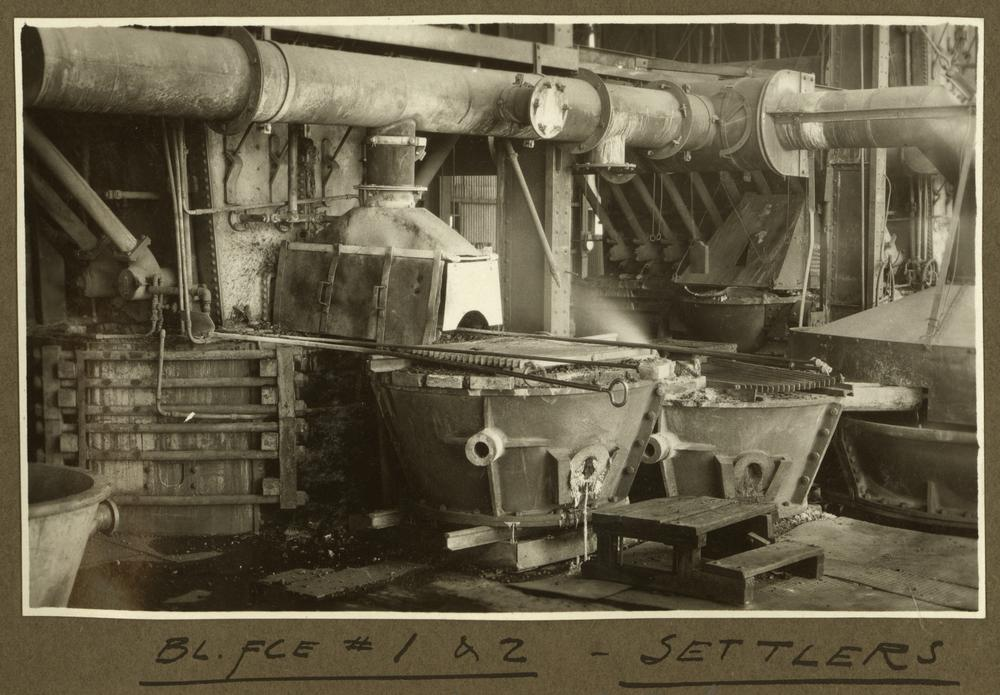
Smelter interior, 1932

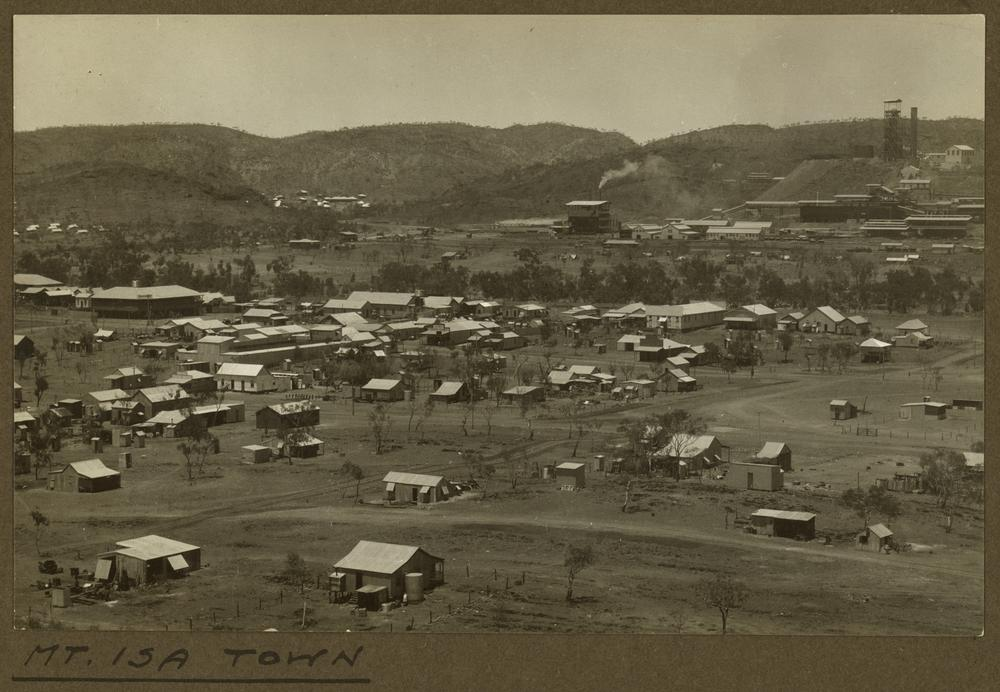
Township, 1932

Mount Isa Post Office opened on 1 August 1924.

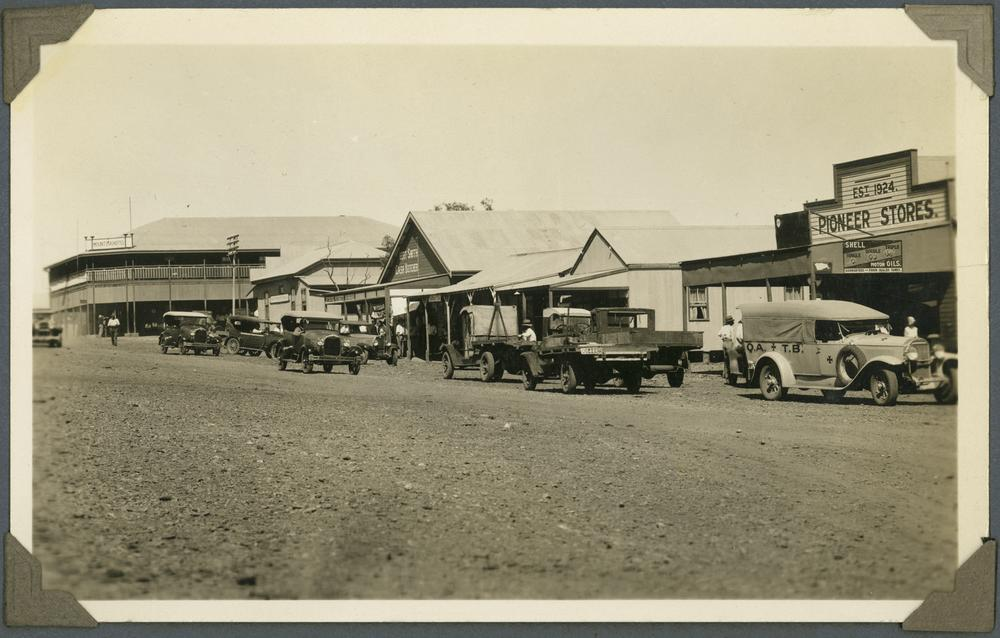
Main street, c. 1936

A location for the town's hospital was chosen in 1929, with a small building completed the following year. In 1931, a larger structure was moved to the site from the closed mining town of Kuridala.

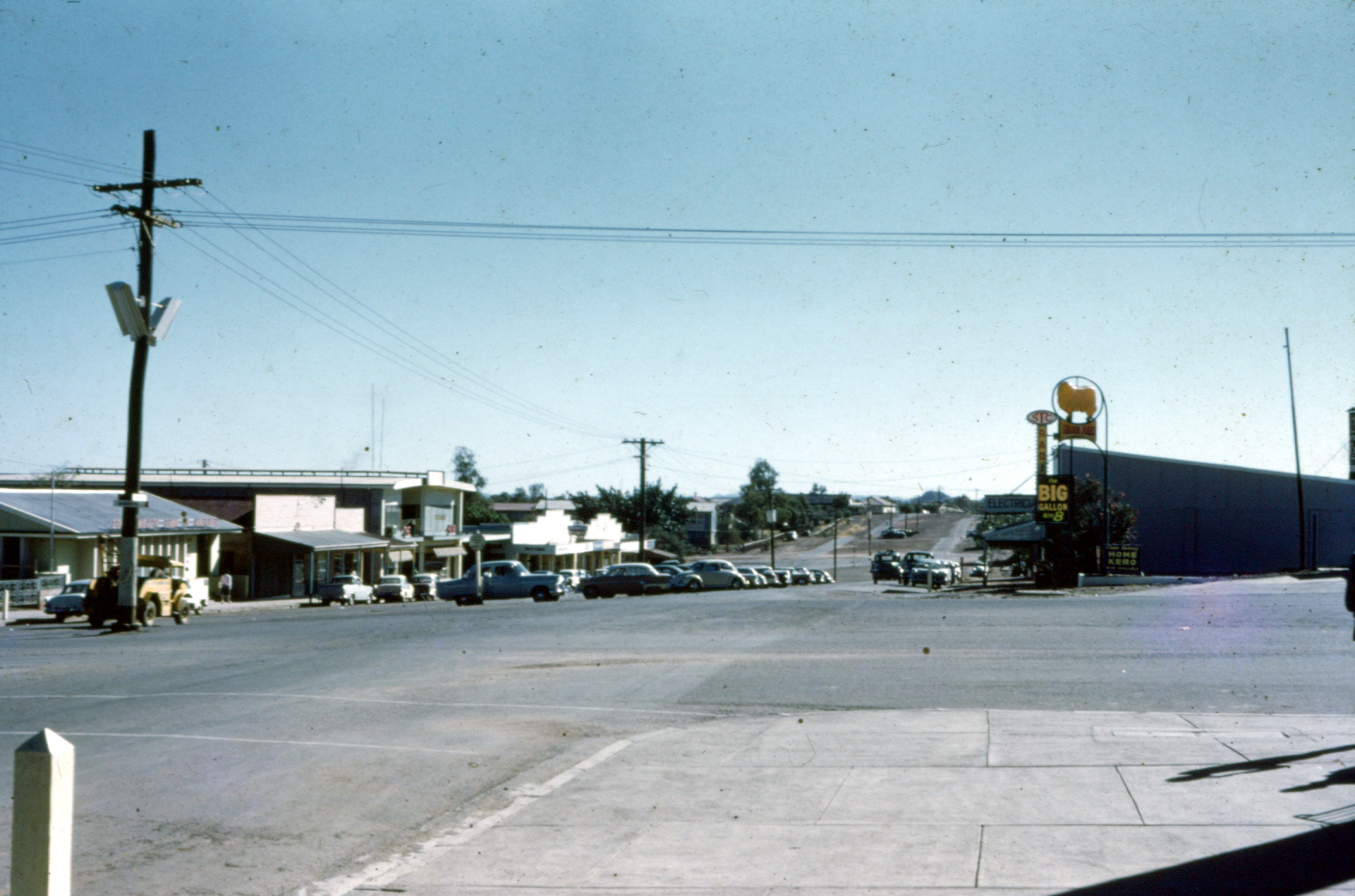
Mt Isa Street, 1962

In 1970, Queen Elizabeth II, The Duke of Edinburgh and Princess Anne toured Australia including Queensland. The Queensland tour began on Sunday 12 April when the royal yacht Britannia entered Moreton Bay at Caloundra, sailing into Newstead Wharf. After visiting Brisbane and Longreach next on the tour was Mount Isa and while there the royals were driven to Kalkadoon Park where the royal couple witnessed a programmed event under the guidance of Ringmaster Mr. J. O’Shea. Kalkadoon Park was the original site of the famous Mount Isa rodeo. The following day, on 16 April, the Duke of Edinburgh was taken on an underground tour of the Mount Isa mine while Queen Elizabeth stayed above ground. The Marshalling Area around R62 Shaft Winder Tower was cleaned, and a display was set up using operational mining equipment from underground so Queen Elizabeth II could see it in action. The display was designed to demonstrate the operation of an EIMCO air powered rail mounted rocker shovel loading ore.

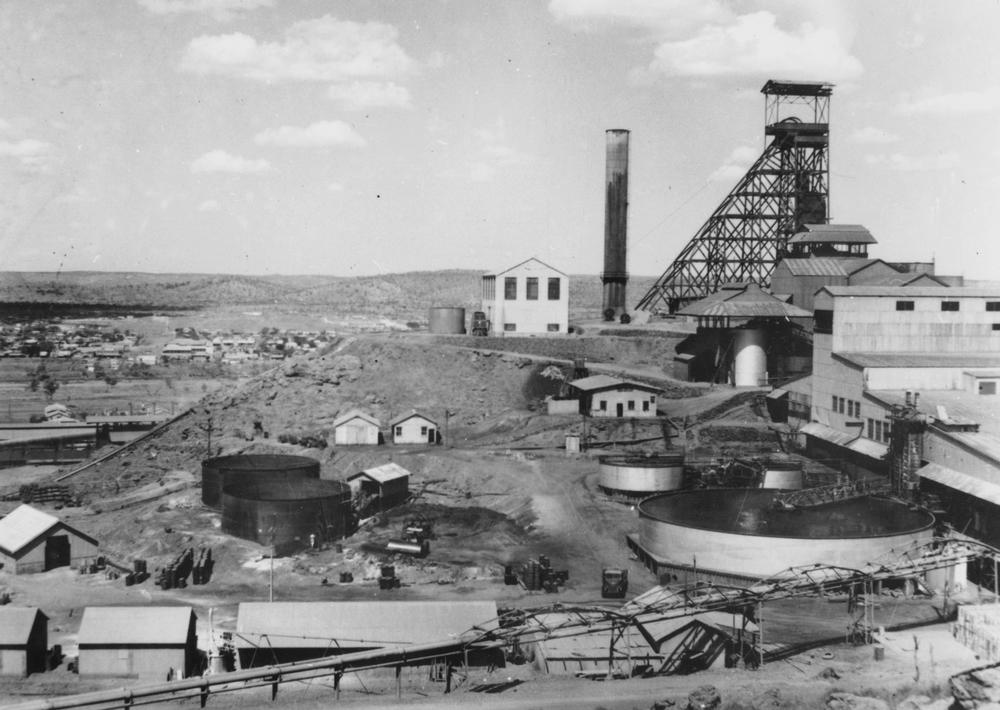
Mining in 1951

The Mount Isa City Library opened in 1974.

On 9 June 2000, the first torch relay in Queensland for the Sydney 2000 Olympics reached Mount Isa.

In 2008, plans were made to build a massive motor sports complex on the city's north-eastern outskirts, but as of 2024 it had not been built.

In 2008, a Queensland Health report found that more than 10% of children in Mount Isa had blood lead levels above World Health Organization recommendations. The mining operator Glencore denied responsibility and stated that the town has naturally high levels of lead in the soil. However, a 2013 study led by Macquarie University environmental engineers has used lead isotope analysis to show conclusively that the lead ingested had originated from smelted ore and not surface deposits.

In 2015, Mt Isa formed its own Symphony Orchestra, acclaimed as the "most remote in the world". Inaugurated on 23 July 2015, the event attracted several stars of the music world, including world-famous jazz musician James Morrison. Morrison also figured in the premiere of Matthew Dewey's 'Symphony of the Inland Sea', composed for the occasion.

On 5 March 2017, Mount Isa was chosen as a host city of the 2018 Commonwealth Games Queen's Baton Relay, along with Cloncurry, Hughenden, Winton and Birdsville. The baton passed through the Mount Isa CBD and suburbs and regions en route before the opening ceremony on the Gold Coast.

== Demographics ==
In 2008, a rumour circulated that the ratio of males to females living in Mount Isa was five to one. Former Mayor John Molony drew international press attention in August 2008 when he told the Townsville Bulletin newspaper that Mount Isa's gender imbalance made it a good place for "not so attractive" women to live. However, the 2011 census revealed that 52.8% of residents were male and 47.2% were female.

In the 2016 census, the town of Mount Isa had a population of 18,342 people.

In the 2021 census, the town of Mount Isa had a population of 18,317 people.

== Heritage listings ==
Mount Isa has a number of heritage-listed sites, including:

- Underground Hospital, Camooweal Street (20.7316°S 139.4947°E)
- Tent House, Camooweal Street (20.7325°S 139.4883°E)
- Spinifex State College Junior Campus, 6–12 Fifth Avenue (20.7341°S 139.4866°E)
- Bower Bird Battery, Mount Isa Mining District (20.0969°S 139.6975°E)
- Mount Isa Mine Early Infrastructure, Mount Isa Mine Lease (20.7335°S 139.4768°E)
- Casa Grande, Nettle Street (20.7413°S 139.4754°E)

== Governance ==
Mount Isa at local level is part of the City of Mount Isa, at state level is part of the electoral district of Mount Isa in the Legislative Assembly of Queensland, and at federal level is part of the Division of Kennedy in the Australian House of Representatives. The City of Mount Isa LGA jurisdiction, covering 43,188 km^{2} (2nd largest in Australia), is the 15th largest in the world in terms of area and takes in the border town of Camooweal, 188 km (117 mi) to the north-west of Mount Isa and 12 km (7.5 mi) from the border of the Northern Territory.

== Economy ==
Mount Isa's industry is largely dependent on mining. Glencore operates the Mount Isa Mines lease adjacent to the city, which comprises the "Enterprise" underground copper mine, X41 underground copper mine, "Black Star Open Cut" silver-lead zinc mine, and metallurgical processing facilities. Silver-lead-zinc ore is also mined 20 km (12 mi) to the north at Hilton from the "George Fisher" underground mine, and the adjoining "Handlebar Hill" open cut, which is trucked back to Mount Isa for processing.

Mount Isa was in the top two of the largest copper mining and smelting operations in the country. Copper and lead are smelted on site, with copper anodes and zinc concentrate being transported 900 km (560 mi) to the city and port of Townsville on the east coast. The lead ingots are transported to a refinery in Britain where the silver is extracted. The mine is the most significant landmark in the area, with the stack from the lead smelter (built 1978), standing 270 m tall, visible from all parts of the city and up to 40 km (25 mi) out.

== Education ==
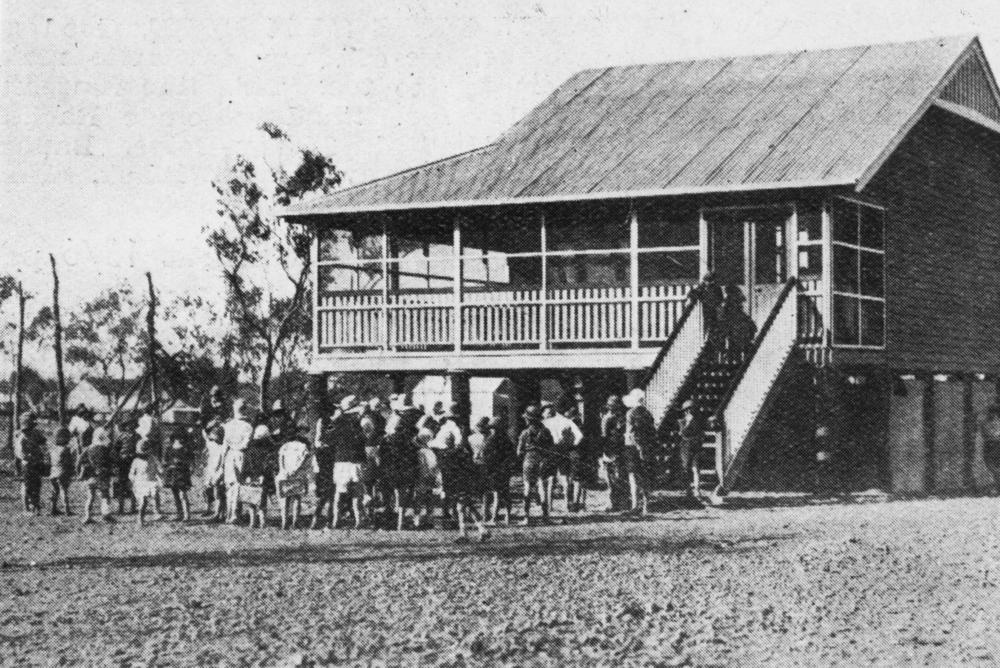
Mount Isa State School, 1929

Mount Isa has eight public primary schools and three private primary schools:

- Happy Valley State School
- Healy State School
- Townview State School
- Barkly Highway State School
- Central State School
- Sunset State School
- Mount Isa School of the Air
- Mount Isa Special School
- St Kieren's (private)
- St Josephs (private)

And four high schools:

- Good Shepherd Catholic College (private)
- Mt Isa Flexible Learning Centre (private)
- Mount Isa School of the Air (to grade 10)
- Spinifex State College – Three campuses, Junior from grade 7 to grade 9, Senior from grade 10 to grade 12, and Residential; for students who don't have a high-school in their region and need to leave their place of residence to access years 7–12. Spinifex State College opened on 1 January 2003. The Junior campus is located at the former Mount Isa State High School. The Senior campus is located at the former Kalkadoon State High School. The Mount Isa Education and Training Precinct campus is an amalgamation of Kalkadoon State High School and Mount Isa State High School to form Spinifex State College Precinct.

Mount Isa is also home to the School of the Air, a unique-to-Australia way of schooling isolated students in Australia's vast lightly populated country areas. The city also holds the main campus of the Mount Isa Institute of TAFE, offering courses in a wide range of fields, including mining, agriculture and trades. In addition, James Cook University has a presence, with the Mount Isa Centre for Rural and Remote Health in the Base Hospital complex.

== Water infrastructure ==
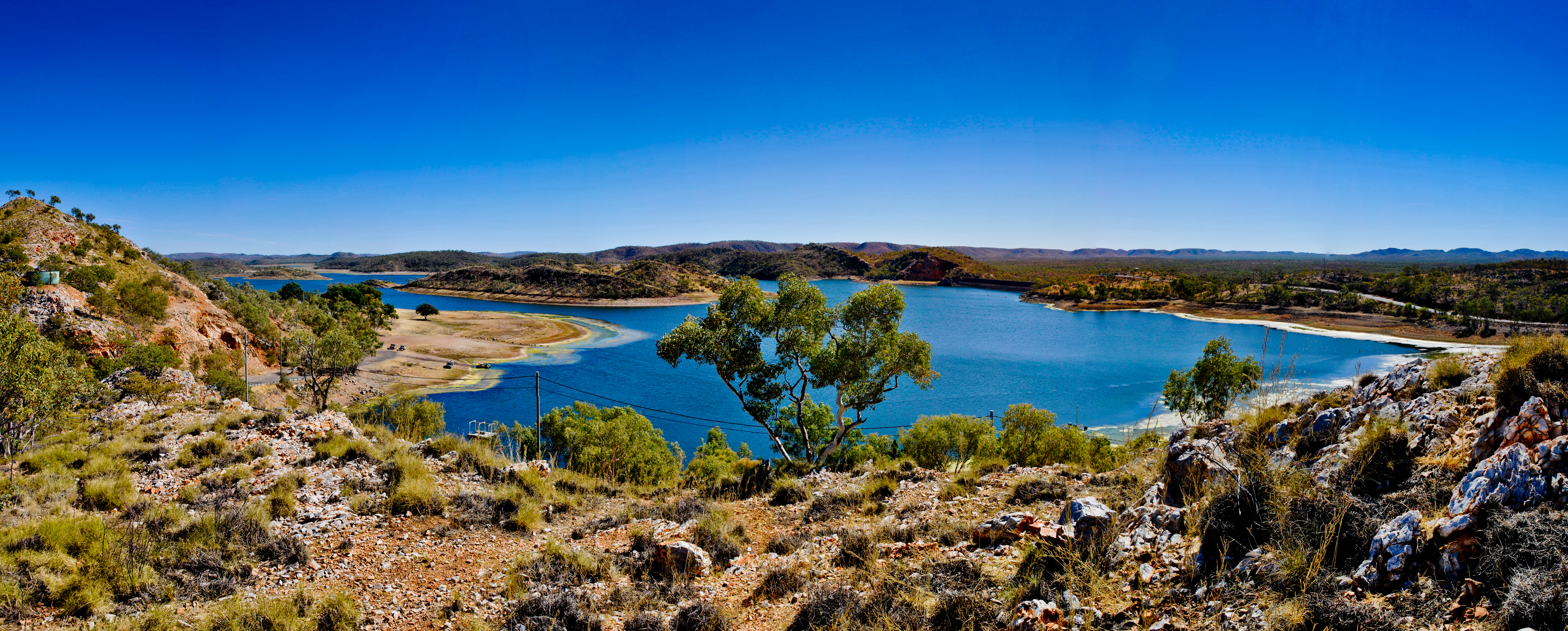
Panorama of Lake Moondarra from lookout above Transport Bay. July 2014. Mount Isa, Queensland.

Mount Isa's water is supplied from Lake Moondarra, 13 km (8.1 mi) from Mount Isa, and from Lake Julius, 60 km (37 mi) from Mount Isa. As it costs approximately twice as much to supply water from Lake Julius, the water is normally drawn from Lake Moondarra. However, during periods of drought, it becomes necessary to draw water supplies from Lake Julius. The three major water users are the Mount Isa Mines, Incitec Pivot and the Mount Isa City Council (which in turn supplies residents and smaller businesses).

A prolonged drought in 2013 caused water levels in Lake Moondarra to become very low, Water has traditionally been processed using a natural filtration process involving reed beds in a large isolated lagoon, which, after disinfecting, produced water to acceptable standards under the Australian Drinking Water Guidelines. The drought caused blooms of blue-green algae in Lake Moondarra, Lake Julius and the Clear Water Lagoon, necessitating the temporary construction of a large filtration plant to remove the algae. In February 2026, the reservoir reached 100% of its capacity due to rains.

== Amenities ==
The City of Mount Isa operates a public library in Mount Isa at 23 West Street which utilizes a high - speed ISDN Internet Connection (powered through the National Broadband Network) to both Townsville and Brisbane.

Mount Isa also has a cinema complex, situated in the inner city on Rodeo Drive, that contains three air-conditioned cinemas, a skate park/aquatic centre and a multi-purpose sporting complex for basketball and other indoor sports. Mount Isa's events complex, Buchanan Park, opened in May 2007, can hold up to 6,000 people and is used for special events such as concerts and expos. It is also the home of the city's annual show and rodeo.

The city is known for its annual Rodeo and Mardi Gras street parade every August. There is also an annual Multicultural Festival in early September.

The local theatre group, the Mount Isa Theatrical Society, also known as MITS, often holds plays and musicals, at least once every few months.

Athletics, gymnastics, tennis, rugby league, field hockey, football, netball, rugby union, cricket, and Australian rules are the most common sports but shooting, squash, softball, basketball, BMX racing, and ten-pin bowling are also present. Mount Isa has a Go Kart Club situated off Duchess Road on the southern side of town.

== Tourism ==
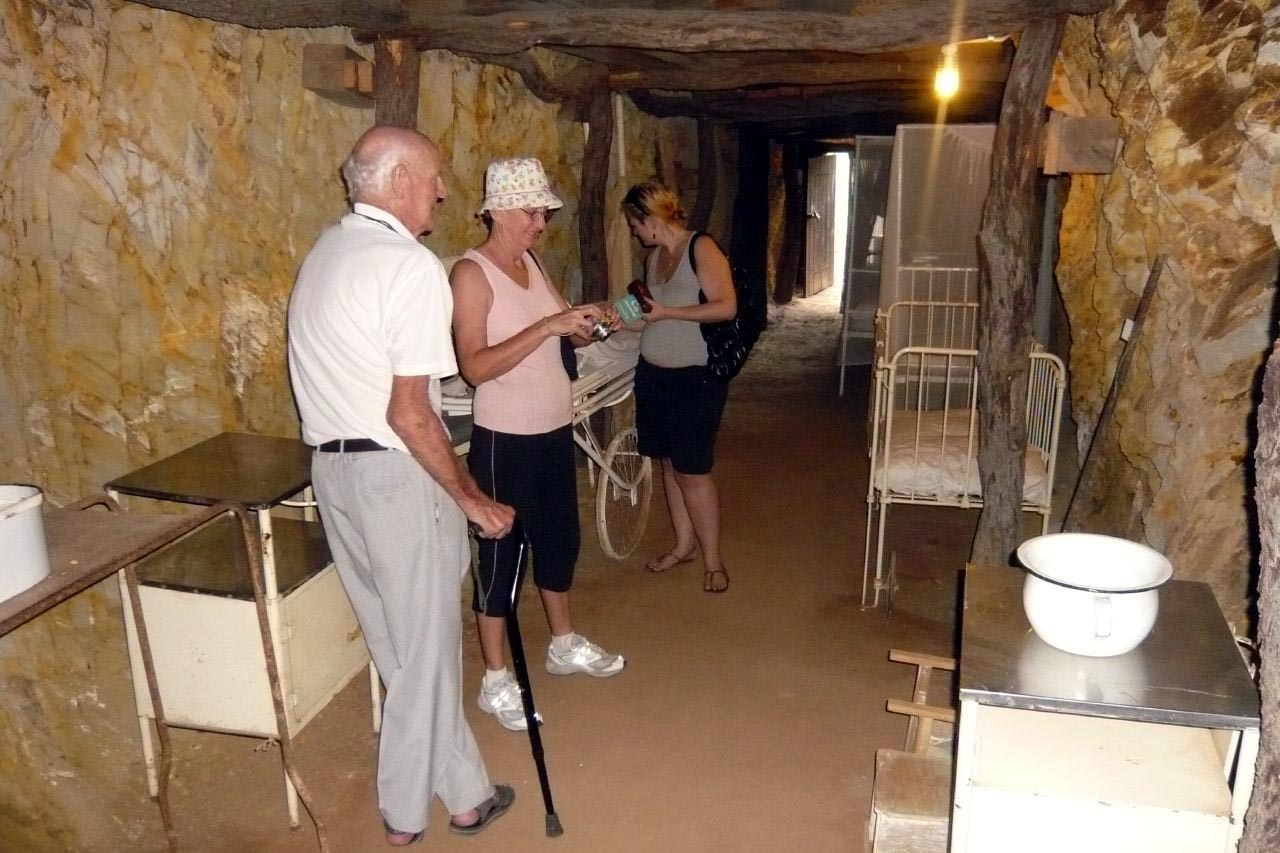
Underground hospital

Attractions include the Hard Times Mine at "Outback at Isa" and The Mount Isa Rodeo and Mardi Gras (held on the same weekend) has given Mount Isa the title of "Rodeo Capital of Australia". The occasion may well triple the city's population in these few days. A memorial has been made especially for the Rodeo, down Rodeo Drive; the sidewalks have special memorials embedded in the cement.

The burial place of John Campbell Miles, the founder of Mount Isa, is on the corner of Rodeo Drive and Miles Street. His ashes are buried underneath a large statue where each panel represents a significant part of Mount Isa. Miles' ashes used to be watched over by a large clock where the statue now stands.

The World War II-era Mount Isa Underground Hospital is an historical building that has been registered on the Register of the National Estate and the Queensland Heritage Register. It is an air-raid shelter which could function as a hospital. It was created as a precautionary measure after Darwin was bombed in 1942. Local miners excavated the site which remains today as the only underground health facility in Queensland which was built during World War II.

== Events ==
The Mount Isa Rodeo has been held annually since 1959. In addition to the rodeo itself, there are associated street parties, music events, market stalls and family entertainment. The Rodeo Queen Quest raises money for charities; the Rodeo Queen is crowned at the Rodeo Ball. Rodeo school is available for aspiring bull riders. It is the largest annual rodeo event in the Southern Hemisphere. It is organised by the combined Rotary clubs of Mount Isa. In 2009 as part of the Q150 celebrations, the Mount Isa Rodeo was announced as one of the Q150 Icons of Queensland for its role as an "event and festival".

The Mount Isa parkrun is a 5 km run in Mount Isa. It starts at 7am every Saturday and is free. The event started in 2018 and has attracted tourists from across the country and more. The event starts at Tharrapatha Way. As at August 2025, the largest attendance is 133. The event caters for all types of runners, walkers and volunteers and is part of a network of global events aimed at improving public physical and mental health.

The Glencore Mount Isa Lake Moondarra Fishing Classic is held annually, and after 2011 will also be followed by a Fishing, Camping and 4x4 Expo. The Fishing Classic is the largest fresh water fishing event in Queensland. Catching the tagged barramundi fetches the greatest prize money.

== Transport ==
Mount Isa city and surrounds are serviced by a 35 vehicle taxi service. A taxi service known as "Isa-Curry" express transports passengers to and from the neighbouring centre of Cloncurry to Mount Isa and back again, usually for shopping and medical requirements. Additionally, many of the city's clubs have courtesy buses to and from their establishments that run seven days a week and into the early hours of the morning. Mount Isa Coaches is a locally owned and operated coach company that provides tours and charter services to the local community as well as mining, sporting, school and airport transfers. Greyhound Australia has a depot in Mount Isa, with coach services to and from Townsville, Brisbane and Tennant Creek.

Mount Isa Airport has regular daily services to Brisbane, Cairns and Townsville, in addition to other services to remote Outback communities in western Queensland. The primary carriers which service Mount Isa and district are Qantas/QantasLink – Brisbane and Townsville; AirNorth – Darwin and Gold Coast; Regional Express – Townsville. In November 2009, it was announced that Skytrans and Westwing Aviation will commence flights in and out of Mount Isa to and from cities on the coast, commencing in February 2010. Regional Express (REX) also announced flights between Mount Isa and Townsville starting after December 2009. Virgin Australia (VA) began services in August 2012 and offers return services from Brisbane on weekdays.

The city is served by QR passenger train The Inlander, which travels overnight to Townsville twice a week in each direction.

Preceding station	Queensland Rail	Following station
Long distance rail services
Duchess towards Townsville	The Inlander	Terminus

== Media ==
=== Radio ===
The following radio stations are available in the Mount Isa region:

- AM 666 4LM (commercial)
- FM 87.6 Vision Radio (religious)
- FM 88.0 Faith FM (religious)
- FM 100.9 Mob FM (commercial – 70% country)
- FM 101.7 ABC Classic
- FM 102.5 Hit FM (commercial – formerly Hot FM)
- FM 103.3 TAB Radio (horse racing)
- FM 104.1 ABC Triple J
- FM 104.9 ABC News Radio
- FM 105.7 Rhema FM (religious)
- FM 106.1 SBS Radio
- FM 106.5 ABC North West
- FM 107.1 ABC Radio National

=== Television ===
Five broadcast television services operate in Mount Isa – commercial stations Central Digital Television (a Network 10 affiliate), Imparja Television (a Nine Network affiliate) and Seven Network (a Seven Network owned and operated station) (formerly known as ITQ, QQQ, QTV and QSTV – Queensland Satellite Regional Television), along with the Government-owned ABC and SBS. Aboriginal focused channels NITV (National Indigenous Television) and ICTV (Indigenous Community Television) broadcasts on UHF channels 36 and 37.

Digital Television transmissions have commenced in Mount Isa. New channels provided by the ABC and SBS can be received with a digital set top box or digital television. Additional channels from the commercial broadcasters that are available in most other areas of Australia are expected to commence transmission in 2011–2012. Analogue television transmissions was switched off on 10 December 2013.

=== Newspapers ===
The North West Star is a local newspaper which is printed three times per week, Tuesday, Thursday and Saturday. The Courier-Mail, The Sunday Mail and the Townsville Bulletin are also available.

== Climate ==
Mount Isa experiences a hot semi-arid climate (Köppen: BSh), with a sweltering wet season from December to March and a lengthy dry season from April to November, with cooler nights and lower humidity. Due to its inland location, average minima strongly vary across seasons, from 8.7 °C (47.7 °F) in July to 23.9 °C (75.0 °F) in January. Average annual rainfall is low: 467.7 mm (18.41 in), occurring within 36.5 rainfall days, with a maximum in summer. The town is very sunny, averaging 175.4 clear days and only 66.9 cloudy days annually. Extreme temperatures have ranged from −2.9 °C (26.8 °F) on 7 July 1984 to 45.9 °C (114.6 °F) on 29 January 1990.

Climate data for Mount Isa (20º40'48"S, 139º29'24"E, 340 m AMSL) (1966–2024 normals and extremes)
Month	Jan	Feb	Mar	Apr	May	Jun	Jul	Aug	Sep	Oct	Nov	Dec	Year
Record high °C (°F)	45.9 (114.6)	43.5 (110.3)	43.1 (109.6)	38.6 (101.5)	37.8 (100.0)	34.3 (93.7)	35.2 (95.4)	37.6 (99.7)	40.4 (104.7)	42.5 (108.5)	43.9 (111.0)	45.4 (113.7)	45.9 (114.6)
Mean maximum °C (°F)	41.1 (106.0)	39.6 (103.3)	38.1 (100.6)	35.8 (96.4)	32.6 (90.7)	30.3 (86.5)	30.6 (87.1)	33.6 (92.5)	36.9 (98.4)	39.7 (103.5)	41.2 (106.2)	42.1 (107.8)	42.8 (109.0)
Mean daily maximum °C (°F)	36.6 (97.9)	35.5 (95.9)	34.5 (94.1)	32.1 (89.8)	28.0 (82.4)	25.0 (77.0)	24.9 (76.8)	27.6 (81.7)	31.5 (88.7)	35.0 (95.0)	36.6 (97.9)	37.4 (99.3)	32.1 (89.7)
Daily mean °C (°F)	30.3 (86.5)	29.4 (84.9)	28.2 (82.8)	25.3 (77.5)	21.0 (69.8)	17.5 (63.5)	16.8 (62.2)	18.9 (66.0)	22.9 (73.2)	26.8 (80.2)	29.1 (84.4)	30.3 (86.5)	24.7 (76.5)
Mean daily minimum °C (°F)	23.9 (75.0)	23.3 (73.9)	21.8 (71.2)	18.5 (65.3)	13.9 (57.0)	10.0 (50.0)	8.7 (47.7)	10.2 (50.4)	14.2 (57.6)	18.6 (65.5)	21.5 (70.7)	23.2 (73.8)	17.3 (63.2)
Mean minimum °C (°F)	19.3 (66.7)	18.7 (65.7)	16.5 (61.7)	11.8 (53.2)	6.9 (44.4)	2.9 (37.2)	2.0 (35.6)	3.0 (37.4)	6.8 (44.2)	11.2 (52.2)	14.8 (58.6)	16.9 (62.4)	1.1 (34.0)
Record low °C (°F)	15.4 (59.7)	13.1 (55.6)	13.1 (55.6)	5.8 (42.4)	1.8 (35.2)	−1.3 (29.7)	−2.9 (26.8)	−1.1 (30.0)	1.0 (33.8)	6.1 (43.0)	10.3 (50.5)	12.0 (53.6)	−2.9 (26.8)
Average precipitation mm (inches)	116.6 (4.59)	102.4 (4.03)	68.6 (2.70)	13.1 (0.52)	11.2 (0.44)	6.9 (0.27)	7.5 (0.30)	3.3 (0.13)	8.7 (0.34)	19.1 (0.75)	38.8 (1.53)	70.8 (2.79)	467.7 (18.41)
Average precipitation days (≥ 1.0 mm)	8.0	7.0	4.2	1.3	1.1	0.7	0.7	0.5	1.0	2.3	4.0	5.7	36.5
Average afternoon relative humidity (%)	35	38	32	27	29	28	25	20	18	18	22	27	27
Average dew point °C (°F)	13.9 (57.0)	15.3 (59.5)	12.4 (54.3)	8.6 (47.5)	6.0 (42.8)	3.5 (38.3)	1.3 (34.3)	0.3 (32.5)	1.2 (34.2)	3.4 (38.1)	6.7 (44.1)	10.5 (50.9)	6.9 (44.5)
Mean monthly sunshine hours	269.7	248.6	279.0	288.0	291.4	285.0	303.8	322.4	309.0	310.0	291.0	288.3	3,486.2
Percentage possible sunshine	66	69	74	83	84	87	89	91	86	79	74	70	79
Source: Bureau of Meteorology (1966-2024 normals and extremes)

== Notable people ==
- William Barton, musician; principally known for playing the didgeridoo
- Bailey Biondi-Odo, rugby league player
- Russell Bawden, rugby league player
- Simon Black, Australian rules footballer
- Charlie Cameron, Australian rules footballer
- Lindy Chamberlain, wrongly imprisoned for the murder of her baby, which was subsequently attributed to dingo attack. Azaria was also born in Mount Isa. In the movie Evil Angels, made about the incident, Mount Isa appears at the beginning scenes of the movie as the hometown of the Chamberlain family.
- Altiyan Childs, winner of the second season of The X Factor
- Peter Crawford, basketball player
- Gerard Denton, cricketer
- Courtenay Dempsey, Australian rules footballer
- Ian Dyk, racing driver
- Nathan Fien, rugby league player
- Karen Foxlee, novelist
- Jamie Goddard, rugby league player
- Coen Hess, rugby league player
- Pat Mackie, union leader (1964/1965 dispute)
- Simmone Jade Mackinnon, actress
- Deborah Mailman, actress
- Tony McGrady, Speaker of the Legislative Assembly of Queensland and Mayor of Mount Isa
- Ricardo Moffatti, Paralympic swimmer
- Greg Norman, golfer
- Kalyn Ponga, rugby league player
- Nev Power, corporate executive
- Scott Prince, rugby league player
- Pat Rafter, tennis player
- Bill Sweetenham, Olympic swimming coach
- Carl Webb, rugby league player
- John White, squash player

== See also ==
- Mount Isa Murders
- Australian Fossil Mammal Sites (Riversleigh)
