= Julius Dam =

Dam in north-west Queensland, Australia

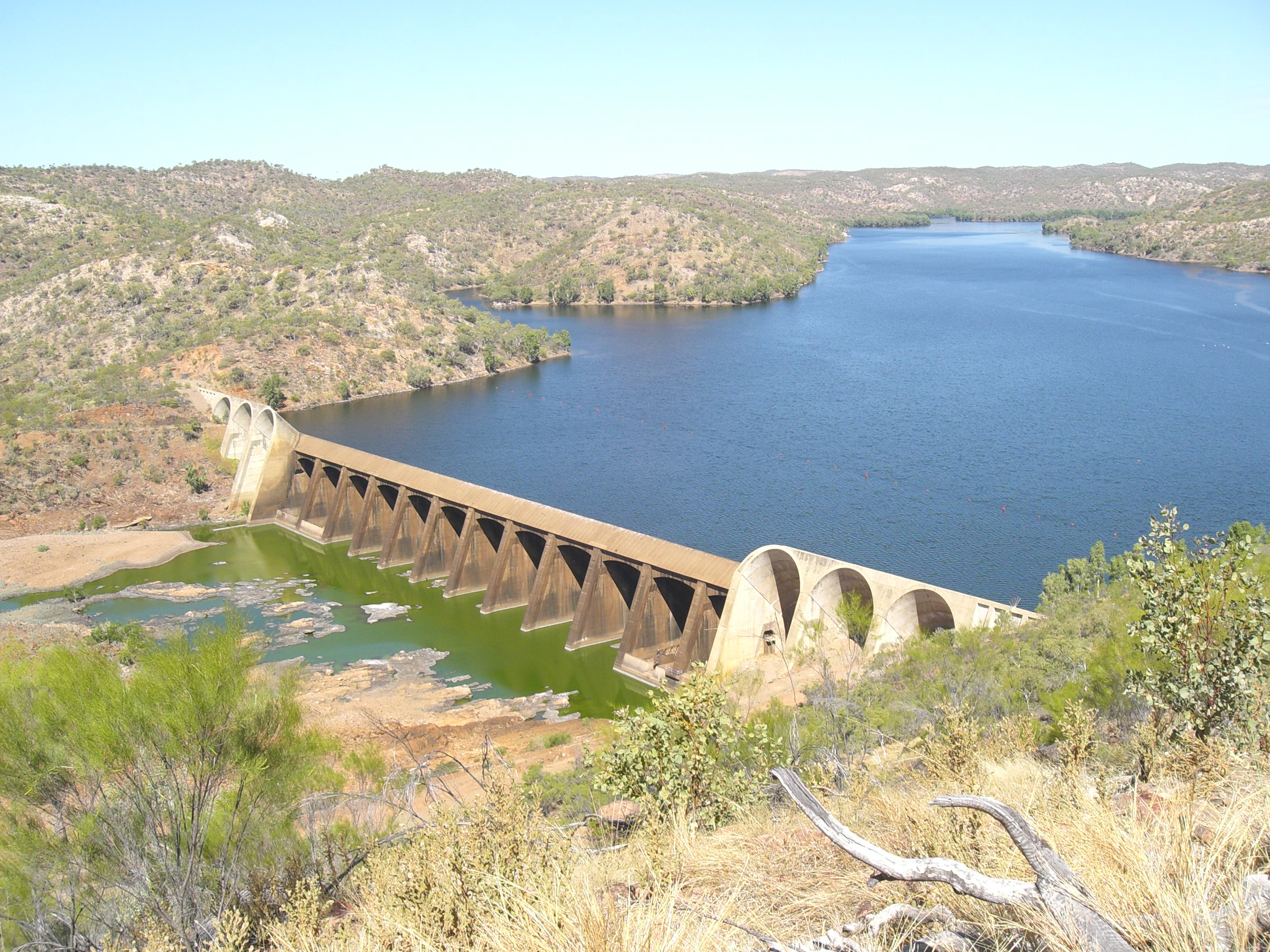
- The dam and reservoir in 2010

- Location of the dam in Queensland
- Interactive map of Julius Dam
- Country: Australia
- Location: 70 km (43 mi) north-east of Mount Isa, North-west Queensland
- Coordinates: 20°07′49″S 139°43′24″E
- Purpose: S
- Status: Operational
- Opening date: 1976
- Built by: Thiess Bros
- Operator: SunWater

Dam and spillways
- Type of dam: Arch buttress dam
- Impounds: Leichhardt River; Paroo Creek
- Height (foundation): 38 m (125 ft)
- Length: 400 m (1,300 ft)
- Dam volume: 45×10^{3} m^{3} (1.6×10^{6} cu ft)
- Spillways: 1
- Spillway type: Uncontrolled
- Spillway length: 219 m (719 ft)
- Spillway capacity: 14,500 m^{3}/s (510,000 cu ft/s)

Reservoir
- Creates: Lake Julius
- Total capacity: 107,500 ML (87,200 acre⋅ft)
- Catchment area: 4,845 km^{2} (1,871 sq mi)
- Surface area: 1,255 ha (3,100 acres)
- Maximum water depth: 25.2 m (83 ft)
- Normal elevation: 223.54 m (733.4 ft) AHD

The Julius Dam is a multiple-arch concrete-buttress dam across the Leichhardt River and Paroo Creek, 70 kilometres (43 mi) north-east of Mount Isa, in north-west Queensland, Australia. Completed in 1976, the impounded reservoir, Lake Julius, supplies water for irrigation and potable town water for Mount Isa and Cloncurry. The dam was named in honour of former Mount Isa Mines chairman and director Julius Kruttschnitt, who was instrumental in helping establish the mining industry in the region.

== Overview ==
The dam is unique in Queensland and is a concrete multiple arch and buttress type structure, with the uncontrolled spillway discharging over the crest of twelve arches. An additional three arches, located on each side of the spillway, approximately 6 to 7 metres (20 to 23 ft) higher than the crest, provide overflow in times of maximum flooding. The spillway is a precast superstructure and the dissipation slab at ground level is post tensioned to the foundation rock. The crest is 18.3 metres (60 ft) above bed level at 223.54 metres (733.4 ft) AHD. The twelve arch barrels, founded on a triangular arch base, are constructed in independent arch rings and are hinged at buttress springing lines.

The dam wall is 38 metres (125 ft) high, 400 metres (1,300 ft) long, and holds back 107,500 megalitres (87,200 acre⋅ft) of water storage at full capacity. The resultant reservoir covers a surface area of 1,255 hectares (3,100 acres) with an average depth of 8.9 metres (29 ft), drawn from a catchment area of 4,845 square kilometres (1,871 sq mi).

Operational volumes at the dam have ranged between a low of 59.22%, recorded on 24 November 2014, and a high of 169.73%, recorded on 15 January 2004; with the latter due to record-breaking rainfall upstream, near Mount Isa.

In 2008, SunWater announced plans to upgrade the capacity of the dam's spillway.

== See also ==
- List of dams and reservoirs in Australia
