= Underground Hospital, Mount Isa =

Former public hospital in Mornington, Mount Isa, Queensland, Australia

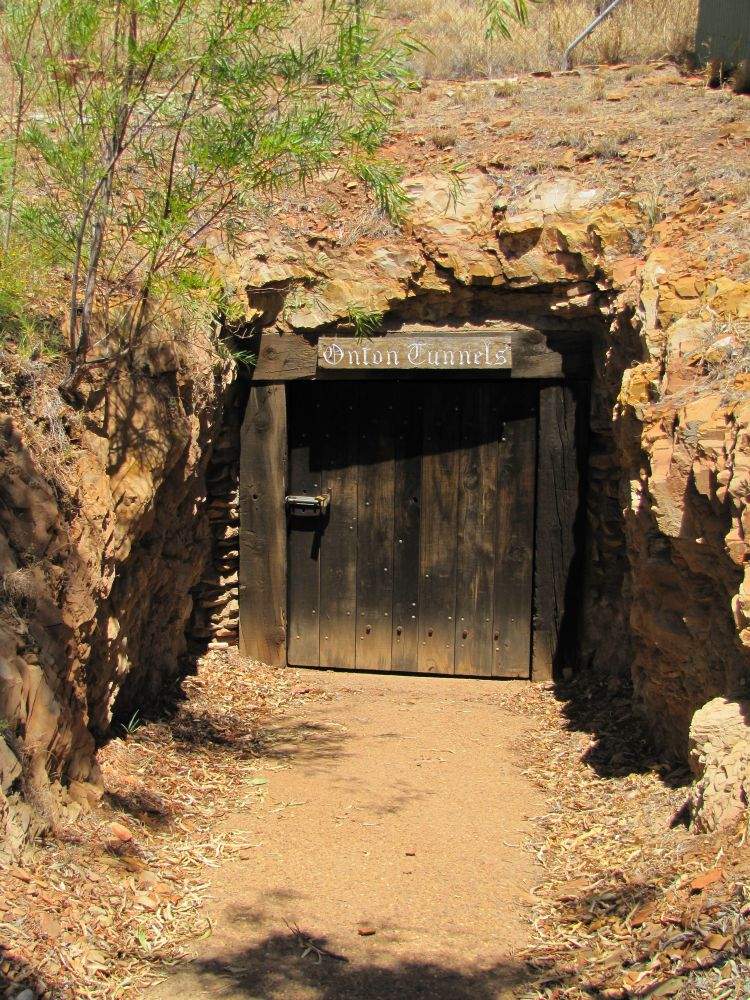
- Entrance to the Underground Hospital, 2013

- Location within Queensland Location within Australia
- 20.7316°S 139.4947°E
- Location: Camooweal Street, Mornington, City of Mount Isa, Queensland, Australia

History
- Design period: 1939–1945 (World War II)
- Built: March 1942 – April 1942

Site notes
- Architect: Edward J. Ryan

Queensland Heritage Register
- Official name: Former Underground Hospital, Mount Isa
- Type: state heritage (built, archaeological)
- Designated: 24 June 1999
- Reference no.: 601102
- Significant period: 1942 (fabric); 1940s–1960s (historical)
- Significant components: objects (movable) – health/care services, other – health/care services: component, adit
- Builders: Mount Isa Mines

The Underground Hospital is a heritage-listed former public hospital located at the rear of the Mount Isa Base Hospital via Deighton Street, Mornington, City of Mount Isa, Queensland, Australia. It was designed by Dr. Edward Joseph Ryan and built in 1942 by Mount Isa Mines. It was added to the Queensland Heritage Register on 24 June 1999.

== History ==
The Mount Isa Underground Hospital was constructed during March to April 1942 in the grounds of the Mount Isa District Hospital, was built by off duty miners from Mount Isa Mines. The structure was designed by Dr Edward Ryan, Superintendent of the Mount Isa District Hospital. Construction work was supervised by Wally Onton, Underground Foreman at Mount Isa Mines.

The war in the Pacific reached the shores of Australia on 19 February 1942. Darwin was bombed by aircraft operating from four aircraft carriers in the Timor Sea. Within days Timor fell to the Japanese, the Australian cruiser HMAS Perth sank during the Battle of the Java Sea, while Broome, Derby and Wyndham in Western Australia, Townsville and Mossman in Queensland, and Port Moresby in New Guinea were all bombed by Japanese aircraft.

The threat to Mount Isa seemed very real because there appeared to be little military opposition left in the north of Australia after the devastation of Darwin and the West Australian towns. The Mount Isa Copper Mine was seen as a strategic resource of great value to the Japanese, being recognised as one of the world's major deposits of copper, lead, zinc and silver. It was believed that like the Japanese controlled tin fields and rubber plantations of Malaya, and the oil fields of Borneo, the Mount Isa Mine was probably a target for invasion forces and air attacks.

Reacting to the perceived threat, Dr Ryan decided to take precautions to protect Mount Isa District Hospital from air raids. Ryan contacted Vic Mann, MIM Mine Superintendent, who offered the co-operation of the company and the services of Underground Foreman Wally Onton to supervise the project. The company supplied all the equipment for the work, which was done by Mount Isa miners who volunteered their time.

The drilling, blasting and mucking out was mostly done over a two-week period, with the fitting-out taking a few more weeks. The work was done during March/April 1942, during which approximately 100 metres (330 ft) of tunnel were excavated. Three parallel adits were driven into the hill face and then connected to a crosscut level to form a large underground shelter with an E-shaped plan. A vertical rise to the hillside above helped ventilation and was also equipped with a ladder to serve as an emergency exit. The excavation was timbered using the contemporary mining methods of the day, then equipped with furnishings and fittings to perform all the functions of a hospital. There were male, female, and maternity/children's wards, a surgical theatre and a delivery room.

The finished underground hospital was about 100 metres (330 ft) from the rear of the nearest hospital building, with access along a gravelled pathway. The three entrances were secured by locked timber gates. Inside the hospital was framed either with sets of round native timber or sawn Oregon timber, the ceiling was sawn hardwood planks and some of the walls were lined with gidyea logs. The floor was bare earth. The hospital was equipped with electric lights and a telephone. Furthermore, buckets of water and sand, stirrup pumps and shovels were present in case of an air raid.

Dr Ryan kept the shelter fully equipped and ready for use with linen, medical equipment, dressings and pharmaceutical stocks. Once a week there was an air raid drill, and nurses and orderlies wheeled less-seriously ill patients up the steep gravel path to the underground hospital.

Mount Isa never experienced air raids, and it soon became apparent that the attacks on Darwin and other northern towns were harassing raids rather than the prelude to an invasion. History shows that Japanese resources were extended to their limit and, after the battles of the Coral Sea and Midway, their naval power was destroyed. The threat of invasion disappeared as the Japanese forces were driven from New Guinea and into retreat from the Pacific.

Although air raid drills ceased, the underground hospital remained in use for less urgent purposes. The shelter was used as a dormitory by the nurses on hot nights, then like most unused spaces, it gradually became a store room of hospital equipment and files. After the war, lax security allowed young children to play in the tunnels, which still contained medical equipment and pharmaceutical supplies.

The shelter was finally closed sometime during the 1960s when rubble, excavated during the construction of the new four-storey hospital wing, was used to close the three entrances. The ventilation rise was also filled in. For approximately ten years the underground hospital remained closed until the fill at the north collapsed in 1977, and at the main entrance in 1988. Each time an entrance opened there was debate in the community regarding the future of the site. In 1992 the main entrance again collapsed and there was considerable debate about the site because of the Australia-wide interest in WWII sites during celebrations which commemorated the Battle of the Coral Sea and the 1942 threat of invasion.

The entrance was again closed, but reopened in 1994. While the entrance was again open and its future was being discussed in the media, a fire broke out in the southern tunnel at 1.30am on 27 August 1994. Queensland Fire Services found water was ineffective and, not knowing the layout of the interior, or the source of the fire, they waited until daylight and filled the tunnel with high expansion foam to extinguish the fire. The Mines Rescue Unit and volunteers later removed most of the burnt timber and stacked it at the main entrance.

In response to the fire, the hospital administration installed a locked trapdoor of heavy steel mesh over the collapsed entrance, and the entrance has remained open but secure against entry for the next three years. A public meeting in late 1995 showed that community support has swung strongly in favour of conserving and developing the underground hospital rather than again burying the entrance.

In 1996 a steering committee, representing the owners, heritage conservation organisations and corporate and community representatives, was formed to manage the future of the underground hospital. A conservation strategy, funded under the Queensland Heritage Grants Program and the National Trust of Queensland, was prepared at the request of the steering committee. Vandals lighted a second fire on Sunday 26 October 1997 causing further damage to the interior.

Plans were in place for the interior of the hospital to be cleared by Green Corps (Young People for the Environment) and volunteer labour. The work will be carried out in consultation with the Cultural Heritage Branch of the Environmental Protection Agency. All artefacts will be documented, tagged and stored at the North West Queensland Museum in Mount Isa. Re-timbering of the interior will be carried out under the supervision of Mount Isa Mines engineers who will also provide some of the equipment required for the project.

== Description ==
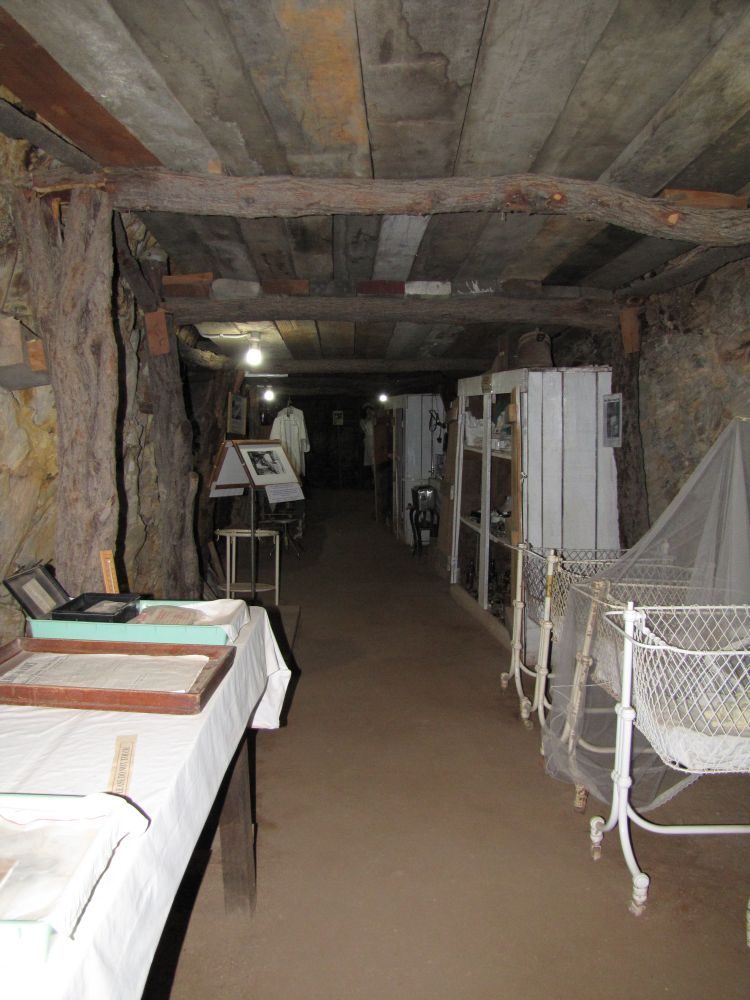
Tunnel in underground Hospital, 2013

The underground hospital occupies an area roughly 20 metres (66 ft) square in the southeastern corner of the Mount Isa Base Hospital grounds. Its south tunnel lies very close to the hospital's southern boundary.

The layout of the underground hospital consists basically of three parallel east-west tunnels, joined at their eastern ends by a tunnel running north-south. All three parallel tunnels were once opened to the outside, but were blocked by rubble in the 1960s. The middle entrance is now partially opened.

=== The Tunnels ===
The three parallel tunnels run almost exactly due east-west. They have been driven in from the surface by drilling and blasting. Some of these drill hole are still visible around the entrance to the middle audit, and in the middle and south tunnels, the drill holes are well preserved in the roof and walls. All the visible stone in the tunnels is a hard, light-coloured shale, which fractures along steeply dipping joint lines. The roof and walls appear to be in good condition overall. Engineering advice since 1994 has indicated that the tunnels are in a sound condition although fist size rock pieces are lying on the floor of the tunnels.

All the rock surfaces in the underground hospital are slightly irregular and roughly finished, so all the following dimensions are necessarily approximate. The middle tunnel is 13.8 metres (45 ft) long from the upper lip of the entrance to the corner of the crosscut, and 2.7 metres (8 ft 10 in) wide. The south tunnel is 14.5 metres (48 ft) long from the crosscut to the last visible timber post standing in the shale mound blocking its entrance, and 2.6 metres (8 ft 6 in) wide. The north tunnel is the shortest and widest of the three, only 10 metres (33 ft) from the crosscut to the last timber set standing in the shale mound blocking its entrance, but 3 metres (9.8 ft) wide. The east tunnel is 20.4 metres (67 ft) long and the widest of the tunnels at 3.5 metres (11 ft). At both ends of the east tunnel, opposite the north and south tunnels, are two recesses in the wall, the same width as the facing tunnels and each about 1.7 metres (5 ft 7 in) deep. The tunnel heights are very difficult to measure, as the entire floor of the underground hospital is covered with debris, and the original floor level can only be guessed at. The roof height, near the corner of the middle and east tunnels is about 2.5 metres (8 ft 2 in) The total exposed floor area of the underground hospital is about 188 metres (617 ft) square.

The ventilating raise is obstructed at its base by fallen stone and timber. It is located in the intersection of the crosscut and the north tunnel, and is about a metre square in section. It appears to rise a little to the north of vertical for four or five metres, narrowing down as it rises, and is then obstructed by stone and timber. Visibility up the rise is obstructed by a heavy growth of tree roots. A small tree, growing up the slope about 20 metres (66 ft) north-east of the buried entrance to the raise is probably the source of the tree roots.

=== The Timbering ===
Internally, the underground hospital was timbered like a mine, although two different techniques were used. The north tunnel was heavily timbered with three piece sets of sawn Oregon { Douglas fir } posts and top lagged with hardwood planks resting on the caps. Five sets were intact in October 1997. The rest of the hospital was lightly timbered with round logs of native hardwood about 1.5 centimetres (0.59 in) in diameter. Throughout most of the hospital only occasional posts were standing in 1997 and most of these were dislodged and leaning. A few intact set survived in the north east corner, showing the construction was generally similar to the sawn timber Oregon sets; having round caps and hardwood plank lagging resting on them. The sets were spaced by sprags resting on cleats nailed to the tops of the posts.

In his 1997 report, Peter Bell indicated that approximately three-quarters of the timber shoring in the underground hospital was missing. He also said that a portion of the remaining timber was suffering from termite damage and dry rot. Unfortunately the dry rot damage has accelerated since the 1997 fire because of the amount of water and foam pumped into the structure during the fire.

=== Wartime Fittings and Equipment ===
Little remains of the furnishings and medical equipment. There is no evidence of the operating theatre equipment, beds, cupboards and other moveable equipment. Some material remaining prior to the fire included benching along the eastern wall, timber shelving, light fittings and timber shoring in the north tunnel. There was also a considerable amount of post war material such as files, X-ray plates and medical equipment such as an autoclave. It is believed that the files and X-ray plates fuelled the 1997 fire.

In the south tunnel there were 1940s light shades, bed tables, as well as post war material such as unidentified machinery and furniture. At the rear of the north and south tunnels are two 2.7 by 1.7 metres (8 ft 10 in × 5 ft 7 in) recesses. Each recess was fitted out with a roughly constructed cupboard, of which only the northern one was surviving in 1997. The recesses and cupboards are thought to have been constructed after WWII.

=== Floor Deposit ===
Throughout the underground hospital, the floor is covered with a deposit of earth, fallen stone, ash, timbers, pieces of furniture, electrical equipment and other material. One conspicuous element of the floor deposit is the number of pharmaceutical bottles and ampoules it contains. Several dozen bottles and a smaller number of ampoules are visible on the surface. Most of the bottles are empty and unlabelled, but some contain liquids and powders. Some samples removed by firemen in 1994 contained ampoules labelled sodium glycophosphate, sulphur powder and saline solution.

== Heritage listing ==
The former Underground Hospital was listed on the Queensland Heritage Register on 24 June 1999 having satisfied the following criteria.

The place is important in demonstrating the evolution or pattern of Queensland's history.

The former Underground Hospital, constructed by Mount Isa Mines volunteer labour in response to the perceived threat of Japanese invasion, is thought to have been excavated between March and April 1942. Mount Isa Mines provided equipment and the services of the Underground Foreman, Wally Onton.

The place demonstrates rare, uncommon or endangered aspects of Queensland's cultural heritage.

The hospital, built entirely underground, is currently thought to be unique in Australia.

The place has potential to yield information that will contribute to an understanding of Queensland's history.

As such, the site possesses considerable archaeological significance, with potential to yield evidence about 1940s medical and nursing technology and about local improvisation during wartime.

The place is important in demonstrating the principal characteristics of a particular class of cultural places.

The underground hospital, designed by Hospital Superintendent, Dr Edward Joseph Ryan is particularly significant as a civilian defence structure built during a period of war. It is also important as an example of mid-20th century mining technology, and the skill and speed of Mount Isa miners of the period.

The place is important in demonstrating a high degree of creative or technical achievement at a particular period.

It is also important as an example of mid-20th century mining technology, and the skill and speed of Mount Isa miners of the period.

The place has a strong or special association with a particular community or cultural group for social, cultural or spiritual reasons.

The Underground Hospital has considerable social significance. Community concern regarding the conservation of the underground hospital is demonstrated by the number of organisations who have become involved in the conservation project, including the Mount Isa Hospital Board and City Council, the Environmental Protection Agency, and the North West Queensland branch of the Queensland Museum.
