= Leichhardt River =

Leichhardt
- Leichhardt River at Stokes, 2013

- Location of the river river mouth in Queensland
- Etymology: Ludwig Leichhardt

Location
- Country: Australia
- State: Queensland
- Region: Gulf Country

Physical characteristics
- Source: Rifle Creek
  - location: Selwyn Range
  - elevation: 406 m (1,332 ft)
- Mouth
  - location: Gulf of Carpentaria
  - coordinates: 17°34′46″S 139°47′37″E
  - elevation: 0 m (0 ft)
- Length: 630 km (390 mi)
- Basin size: 32,878 km^{2} (12,694 sq mi)
- Discharge
  - average: 69 m^{3}/s (2,400 cu ft/s)

Basin features
- Waterbodies: Rifle Creek Dam; East Leichhardt Dam; Julius Dam; Lake Moondarra
- Waterfalls: Leichhardt Falls

The Leichhardt River is a river in north-west Queensland, Australia.

== Course ==
The source of the river is in the Selwyn Range under Rifle Creek Hill and fed by Rifle Creek approximately 25 kilometres (16 mi) south of the mining town Mount Isa. It runs in a generally northerly direction almost parallel with the Diamantina Developmental Road until it reaches Mount Isa and crosses the Barkly Highway. It continues in a north easterly direction across the Gulf Country, impounded by the Leichhardt River Dam to form Lake Moondarra, past Glenroy Station then through Lake Julius. It then bears east then north again, almost parallel with the Burke Developmental Road, until crossed near Nardoo, and the river then continues north past Augustus Downs Station to its mouth at the Gulf of Carpentaria.

The river was named by explorer and surveyor Augustus Charles Gregory after the early explorer of Australia, Ludwig Leichhardt. Gregory chose the name because:

"Two days' journey S.E. brought us to a river 100 yards wide, in detached pools. (Latitude 18 degrees 12 minutes, longitude 189 degrees 65 minutes.) This river was mistaken for the Albert by Dr. Leichhardt, and I therefore named it after that enterprising explorer."

== Catchment ==
Leichhardt River has a catchment area of 32,878 square kilometres (12,694 sq mi). Primary activities undertaken in the watershed include mining and grazing.

The river is ephemeral and in the dry season the upstream reaches retract to a series of waterholes. The drainage basin and river estuary are in a near pristine condition.

The river is dammed near Mount Isa to form Lake Moondarra. Other storage facilities in the catchment include Julius Dam, East Leichhardt Dam and Rifle Creek Dam. Around 50 kilometres (31 mi) upstream from its mouth are the Leichhardt Falls. As well as Mount Isa, the small community of Kajabbi is located on the river.

The river has a mean annual discharge of 2,179 gigalitres (2.85×10^{9} cu yd).

== History ==
In 2009 Xstrata spent $3 million for remediation work involving the removal of 40,000 tonnes of material from the riverbed.

Fossil remains have been found along the river's course. In 2011 an unidentified ancient marsupial was discovered by paleontologists.

== See also ==
- List of rivers of Australia § Queensland
