= Soldiers Hill =

Soldiers Hill may refer to one of:

Suburbs

- Soldiers Hill, Victoria, a suburb of Ballarat including the hill after which it was named
- Soldiers Hill, Queensland, a suburb of Mount Isa
- A landform (hill) near Culcairn, New South Wales
