= Australian rules football leagues in regional Queensland =

There are several Australian rules football leagues in regional Queensland.

The sport of Australian rules football has a rich history in Queensland which dates back to the 1860s, however the game outside of South East Queensland was slower to take off than in Brisbane.

In 1913, a team of servicemen briefly existed on Thursday Island, but was short-lived. In 1944, a league of servicemen was formed around the Atherton Tableland. Teams represented included Wongabel, Wondelca, Kairi, Mareeba and Ravenshoe. The league was a precursor to the nearby Cairns, Queensland league.

In 1955, the Townsville Australian Football League began. Two years later the Cairns Australian Football League was formed. AFL was also introduced to Mount Isa. In the early 1970s, organised leagues started appearing in Mackay, the Darling Downs and Central Queensland.

The Australian Football League has occasionally played pre-season matches in Cairns and there have been semi-regular premiership matches on the Gold Coast.

== Current competitions ==
=== AFL Cairns ===
AFL Cairns is a semi-professional league that includes clubs from the Cairns region in Queensland, Australia. It is widely regarded as the strongest regional Australian rules football league in Queensland and has a large base at Cazaly's Stadium which has staged Australian Football League matches.

The league has significant coverage in local media such as The Cairns Post. Each year the Grand Final attracts between 2,000–3,000 spectators.

=== AFL Capricornia ===
AFL Capricornia is an amateur competition played in the areas of Rockhampton, Gladstone and Yeppoon between the months of March and September in the cooler seasons of the Central Queensland climate.

The league is covered primarily by the Rockhampton Morning Bulletin in the local print media.

=== AFL Darling Downs ===
AFL Darling Downs is an amateur competition formed as the Darling Downs Australian Football League in 1971. It is based around the city of Toowoomba west of Brisbane. The senior representative team is known as the Demons and wear guernseys modelled on the Melbourne Demons guernseys. The Under 18 representative team who participate in the AFLQ Under 18 competition are known as the "Crows" and wear guernseys modelled on the Adelaide Crows guernseys.

=== AFL Mackay ===
AFL Mackay is an amateur competition formed as the Mackay Australian Football League in 1970. It is based around the city of Mackay with further clubs in Airlie Beach, Sarina, Alligator Creek, Pioneer Valley and Moranbah. The representative team is known as the Crows.

=== AFL Mount Isa ===
AFL Mount Isa is an amateur competition formed as the North West Australian Football League in 1967, changing its name to the Mount Isa AFL in 1969. Prior to this the game was played but was not organised. It is based around the city of Mount Isa.

The first matches in Mount Isa were played in 1932. The city had 3 clubs by 1933. Another league was formed in 1955. However the current league wasn't established until much later.

==== Current clubs ====
| Club | Colours | Nickname | Home Ground | Est. | Years in MIAFL | MIAFL Senior Premierships | |
| Club | Colours | Nickname | Home Ground | Est. | Years in MIAFL | Total | Years |
|---|---|---|---|---|---|---|---|
| Dajarra | | Rhinos | Monument Sports Oval, Dajarra | 2018 | 2018- | 0 | - |
| Alpurrurulam | | Bats | Alpurrurulam Oval, Alpurrurulam (NT) | 1993 | 1993- | 3 | 2002, 2003, 2025 |
| Mount Isa Buffaloes | | Buffaloes | Legend Oval, Mount Isa | 1983 | 1983- | 10 | 1992, 1994, 1995, 2017, 2018, 2020, 2021, 2023, 2024, 2026 |
| Mount Isa Tigers (Barkly 1967-70s) | | Tigers | Legend Oval, Mount Isa | 1967 | 1967- | 13 | 1971, 1973, 1983, 1989, 1998, 1999, 2006, 2011, 2014, 2015, 2016, 2019, 2022 |

==== Former clubs ====
| Club | Colours | Nickname | Home Ground | Est. | Former league | Years in MIAFL | MIAFL Senior Premierships | | Fate |
| Club | Colours | Nickname | Home Ground | Est. | Former league | Years in MIAFL | Total | Years | Fate |
|---|---|---|---|---|---|---|---|---|---|
| Healy Hawks (Parkside 1967-?, Hawks ?-1976) | | Hawks | Alexandra Park, Soldiers Hill | 1967 | – | 1967-1978 | 3 | 1967, 1972, 1975 | Folded after 1978 season |
| Healy Cobras | (1971)(1972-76) | Cobras | Alexandra Park, Soldiers Hill | 1971 | – | 1971-1976 | 0 | - | Merged with Hawks after 1976 season |
| Mary Kathleen | | Magpies | Mary Kathleen Oval, Mary Kathleen | 1957 | NWQANFA | 1976-1982 | 3 | 1977, 1978, 1979 | Folded after 1982 season |
| Mount Isa Rovers (Irish Rovers 1967-70s) | (1967-?)(?-2020) | Rovers | Legend Oval, Mount Isa | 1967 | – | 1967-2020 | 24 | 1968, 1976, 1980, 1981, 1982, 1984, 1985, 1986, 1988, 1990, 1991, 1993, 1996, 1997, 2000, 2001, 2004, 2005, 2007, 2008, 2009, 2010, 2012, 2013 | Folded after 2020 season |
| Saints (Townview 1967-?, 1978-?) | | Saints | Alexandra Park, Soldiers Hill | 1967 | – | 1967-1980s | 4 | 1969, 1970, 1974, 1987 | Folded in late 1980s |

==== Premiers ====
North West Australian Football League (1967-1968) / Mount Isa AFL (1969-1999) / AFL Mount Isa (2000-present)

- 1967: Hawks
- 1968: Rovers
- 1969: Saints
- 1970: Saints
- 1971: Tigers
- 1972: Hawks
- 1973: Tigers
- 1974: Saints
- 1975: Hawks
- 1976: Rovers
- 1977: Mary Kathleen
- 1978: Mary Kathleen
- 1979: Mary Kathleen
- 1980: Rovers
- 1981: Rovers
- 1982: Rovers
- 1983: Tigers
- 1984: Rovers
- 1985: Rovers
- 1986: Rovers
- 1987: Saints
- 1988: Rovers
- 1989: Tigers
- 1990: Rovers
- 1991: Rovers
- 1992: Buffaloes
- 1993: Rovers
- 1994: Buffaloes
- 1995: Buffaloes
- 1996: Rovers
- 1997: Rovers
- 1998: Tigers
- 1999: Tigers
- 2000: Rovers
- 2001: Rovers
- 2002: Lake Nash
- 2003: Lake Nash
- 2004: Rovers
- 2005: Rovers
- 2006: Tigers
- 2007: Rovers
- 2008: Rovers
- 2009: Rovers
- 2010: Rovers
- 2011: Tigers
- 2012: Rovers
- 2013: Rovers
- 2014: Tigers
- 2015: Tigers
- 2016: Tigers
- 2017: Buffaloes
- 2018: Buffaloes
- 2019: Tigers
- 2020: Buffaloes
- 2021: Buffaloes
- 2022: Tigers
- 2023: Buffaloes
- 2024: Buffaloes
Locations of the AFL Mount Isa clubs

=== AFL Townsville ===
AFL Townsville is an amateur competition formed as the Townsville Australian Football League in 1955, the first AFL competition to be formed in Queensland outside of the South East. It is based around the city of Townsville. For a short period in the 1980s, the competition was played during the summer months. The representative team is known as the Eagles and they wear similar guernseys to the Zillmere Eagles old white and blue guernsey's.

=== AFL Wide Bay ===
The AFL Wide Bay competition was formerly known as the Bundaberg-Wide Bay Australian Football League which was formed in 1987 through the merger of the Bundaberg Australian Football League and Wide Bay Australian Football Leagues. The competition currently features teams from the cities of Bundaberg, Maryborough and Hervey Bay. The representative team is known as the Tigers wearing guernseys similar to those of the Richmond Tigers.

== Defunct competitions ==
=== Bundaberg Australian Football League ===
The Bundaberg Australian Football League was an amateur competition formed in 1972 and continued until 1986, before merging with the Wide Bay Australian Football League, starting a new competition called the Bundaberg Wide Bay Australian Football League in 1987, now known as AFL Wide Bay.

The four foundation clubs were Burnett Heads, Southern Suburbs (South Bundaberg), Western Suburbs (West Bundaberg), and North Bundaberg.

==== Clubs ====
===== Final =====
| Club | Colours | Nickname | Home Ground | Est. | Years in BAFL | BAFL Senior Premierships | | Fate |
| Club | Colours | Nickname | Home Ground | Est. | Years in BAFL | Total | Years | Fate |
|---|---|---|---|---|---|---|---|---|
| Burnett Heads | | Saints | Jack Norgate Oval, Burnett Heads | 1972 | 1972-1986 | 0 | - | Formed Bundaberg Wide Bay AFL in 1987 |
| North Bundaberg | | Kangaroos | Kendall Flat, Bundaberg East | 1972 | 1972–1986 | 5 | 1972, 1975, 1976, 1978, 1979 | Formed Bundaberg Wide Bay AFL in 1987 |
| South Bundaberg | | Magpies | Kendall Flat, Bundaberg East | 1972 | 1972–1986 | 1 | 1981 | Formed Bundaberg Wide Bay AFL in 1987 |
| West Bundaberg | | Bulldogs | Kendall Flat, Bundaberg East | 1972 | 1972–1986 | 5 | 1973, 1974, 1980, 1985, 1986 | Formed Bundaberg Wide Bay AFL in 1987 |

===== Former =====
| Club | Colours | Nickname | Home Ground | Former league | Est. | Years in BAFL | BAFL Senior Premierships | | Fate |
| Club | Colours | Nickname | Home Ground | Former league | Est. | Years in BAFL | Total | Years | Fate |
|---|---|---|---|---|---|---|---|---|---|
| Bargara | | | | – | 1983 | 1983 | 0 | - | Folded after being excluded from BAFL 5 games into 1983 season due to inability to field reserves |
| Biggenden | | Falcons | Biggenden Sportsgrounds, Biggenden | MAFL | 1981 | 1983 | 0 | - | Folded after 1983 season |
| Burnett Heads | | Saints | Jack Norgate Oval, Burnett Heads | – | 1972 | 1972-1982 | 0 | - | Recess between 1983 and 1986, re-formed in Wide Bay AFL in 1987 |
| Brothers | | | | – | 1985 | 1985 | 0 | - | Folded after 1985 season |
| Cooloola Coast | | Dolphins | Lee Lee Park, Tin Can Bay | MAFL | 1982 | 1984 | 0 | - | Formed Wide Bay AFL in 1985 |
| Gympie | | Cats | Ray Warren Oval, Glanmire | SCAFL | 1971 | 1984 | 0 | - | Formed Wide Bay AFL in 1985 |
| Maryborough United | | Demons | AFL Federation Reserve, Maryborough | SCAFL | 1977 | 1979, 1984 | 0 | - | Formed Maryborough AFL in 1981 |
| South Bundaberg (2) | | Seagulls | Kendall Flat, Bundaberg East | – | 1979 | 1979 | 0 | - | Folded after 1979 season |
| Urangan (Hervey Bay 1977-83) | | Sea Hawks | N. E. Mclean Oval, Wondunna | – | 1977 | 1977, 1982-1984 | 4 | 1977, 1982, 1983, 1984 | Formed Wide Bay AFL in 1985 |

==== Premiers ====
Bundaberg AFL (1972-1986)

- 1972: North Bundaberg
- 1973: Western Suburbs
- 1974: Western Suburbs
- 1975: North Bundaberg
- 1976: North Bundaberg
- 1977: Hervey Bay
- 1978: North Bundaberg
- 1979: North Bundaberg
- 1980: West Bundaberg
- 1981: South Bundaberg
- 1982: Hervey Bay
- 1983: Hervey Bay
- 1984: Urangan
- 1985: West Bundaberg
- 1986: West Bundaberg

=== Central Highlands Australian Football League ===
The Central Highlands Australian Football League was an amateur competition formed in 1983 and ceased operations after the 1997 season. Most of the previous clubs still exist and operate Auskick programs, including Dysart and Emerald. The Moranbah Bulldogs moved to the Mackay Australian Football League after the league folded.

The league was a once flourishing competition with Clubs competing in Seniors, Reserves and juniors in Under 16's, 14's, and 12's. Around 1994, the mines in the area shifted from a five-day week into a seven-day 12-hour roster, which in turn limited teams' playing rosters. The league then changed onfield playing numbers from 18 to 13 with unlimited bench players. Unfortunately this still did not help and most clubs were forced to cease operations due to lack of playing numbers and not of financial matters.

Prior to the formation of the competition, Dysart, Middlemount and Moranbah had played in Mackay's competition.

==== Clubs ====
===== Final =====
| Club | Colours | Nickname | Home Ground | Former League | Est. | Years in CHAFL | CHAFL Senior Premierships | | Fate |
| Club | Colours | Nickname | Home Ground | Former League | Est. | Years in CHAFL | Total | Years | Fate |
|---|---|---|---|---|---|---|---|---|---|
| Blackwater | | Cats | Blackwater Cricket Ground, Blackwater | CAFL | 1981 | 1983-1997 | 3 | 1991, 1992, 1993 | Folded after 1997 season |
| Dysart | | Swans | Leichhardt Recreation Reserve, Dysart | MAFL | 1980 | 1983-1997 | 2 | 1983, 1984 | Folded after 1997 season |
| Emerald | | Saints | Emerald Showground, Emerald | – | 1983 | 1983-1997 | 7 | 1988, 1989, 1993, 1994, 1995, 1996, 1997 | Folded after 1997 season |
| Moranbah | | Bulldogs | Stevenson Sports Park, Moranbah | MAFL | 1975 | 1983-1988, 1994-1997 | 2 | 1985, 1986 | Folded after 1997 season, re-formed in Mackay AFL in 2006 |

===== Former =====
| Club | Colours | Nickname | Home Ground | Former League | Est. | Years in CHAFL | CHAFL Senior Premierships | | Fate |
| Club | Colours | Nickname | Home Ground | Former League | Est. | Years in CHAFL | Total | Years | Fate |
|---|---|---|---|---|---|---|---|---|---|
| Clermont | | Wombats | Clermont Showground, Clermont | – | 1985 | 1985-1986 | 0 | - | Folded after 1986 season |
| Middlemount | | Kangaroos | Middlemount Sporting Complex, Middlemount | MAFL | 1982 | 1983-1991 | 1 | 1987 | Merged with Tieri after 1991 season |
| Tieri (United 1992-95) | | Tigers | Tieri Oval, Tieri | – | 1983 | 1983-1996 | 0 | - | Folded after 1996 season |

==== Premiers ====
Central Highlands AFL (1983-1997)

- 1983: Dysart
- 1984: Dysart
- 1985: Moranbah
- 1986: Moranbah
- 1987: Middlemount
- 1988: Emerald
- 1989: Emerald
- 1990: Blackwater
- 1991: Blackwater
- 1992: Blackwater
- 1993: Emerald
- 1994: Emerald
- 1995: Emerald
- 1996: Emerald
- 1997: Emerald

=== Gold Coast Australian Football League ===
The Gold Coast Australian Football League was a competition that operated from 1961 to 1996 before being absorbed by the Queensland AFL as its Gold Coast Division.

==== Clubs ====
===== Final =====
| Club | Colours | Nickname | Home Ground | Est. | Years in GCAFL | GCAFL Senior Premierships | | Fate |
| Club | Colours | Nickname | Home Ground | Est. | Years in GCAFL | Total | Years | Fate |
|---|---|---|---|---|---|---|---|---|
| Broadbeach | | Cats | Subaru Oval, Mermaid Waters | 1971 | 1971-1996 | 2 | 1987, 1996 | Moved to Queensland AFL in 1997 |
| Burleigh Heads | | Bombers | Bill Godfrey Oval, Burleigh Waters | 1979 | 1979-1996 | 0 | - | Moved to Queensland AFL in 1997 |
| Coolangatta Tweed Heads | | Blues | EXIMM Oval, Coolangatta | 1962 | 1965-1996 | 6 | 1978, 1981, 1982, 1983, 1988, 1989 | Moved to Queensland AFL in 1997 |
| Labrador | | Tigers | Cooke-Murphy Oval, Labrador | 1964 | 1964-1966, 1968-1996 | 5 | 1970, 1986, 1991, 1993, 1994 | Recess in 1967. Moved to Queensland AFL in 1997 |
| Palm Beach Currumbin (Centrals 1961, Currumbin 1963) | | Lions | Salk Oval, Palm Beach | 1961 | 1961-1996 | 5 | 1965, 1971, 1973, 1985, 1995 | Moved to Queensland AFL in 1997 |
| Robina | | Roos | Scottsdale Reserve, Robina | 1996 | 1996 | 0 | - | Moved to Queensland AFL in 1997 |
| Surfers Paradise | | Demons | Sir Bruce Small Park, Benowa | 1962 | 1962-1996 | 9 | 1963, 1967, 1968, 1969, 1972, 1974, 1984, 1990, 1992 | Moved to Queensland AFL in 1997 |

===== Former =====
| Club | Colours | Nickname | Home Ground | Former league | Est. | Years in GCAFL | GCAFL Senior Premierships | | Fate |
| Club | Colours | Nickname | Home Ground | Former league | Est. | Years in GCAFL | Total | Years | Fate |
|---|---|---|---|---|---|---|---|---|---|
| Ashmore Nerang | | Magpies | | – | 1985 | 1985-1989 | 0 | - | Folded after 1989 season |
| Beenleigh (1) | | Bombers | | – | 1965 | 1965-1966 | 0 | - | Folded after 1966 season |
| Beenleigh (2) | (1986-89)(1990) | Cobras | Alexander Clark Park, Loganholme | SQAFA | 1973 | 1986-1990 | 0 | - | Returned to SQAFA in 1991 |
| Ipswich | | Cats | Limestone Park, Ipswich | – | 1959 | 1961, 1963 | 0 | - | Moved to Queensland ANFL B-grade competition in 1964 |
| Lismore | (1968-70)(1978-83) | Kangaroos | Gloria Mortimer Oval, Lismore | – | 1968 | 1968-1970, 1978-1983 | 0 | - | Recess between 1971-77. Formed Summerland AFL in 1984 |
| Sherwood | | Magpies | Chelmer Oval, Chelmer | QAFL | 1956 | 1988-1990 | 0 | - | Merged with Western Districts to form West Brisbane in QAFL in 1991 |
| Southport | | Magpies | Owen Park, Southport | – | 1961 | 1961-1982 | 9 | 1961, 1962, 1964, 1966, 1975, 1976, 1977, 1979, 1980 | Moved to Queensland AFL in 1983 |
| Southport United | | | | – | 1967 | 1967 | 0 | - | Folded after 1967 season |
| Surfers-Broadbeach | | | | – | 1967 | 1967 | 0 | - | Folded during 1967 season |
| Wacol | | | | – | 1963 | 1963 | 0 | - | Folded after 1963 season |

==== Premiers ====
Gold Coast AFL (1961-1996) / AFLQ - Gold Coast Division (1997-1999)

- 1961: Southport
- 1962: Southport
- 1963: Surfers Paradise
- 1964: Southport
- 1965: Palm Beach-Currumbin
- 1966: Southport
- 1967: Surfers Paradise
- 1968: Surfers Paradise
- 1969: Surfers Paradise
- 1970: Labrador
- 1971: Palm Beach-Currumbin
- 1972: Surfers Paradise
- 1973: Palm Beach-Currumbin
- 1974: Surfers Paradise
- 1975: Southport
- 1976: Southport
- 1977: Southport
- 1978: Coolangatta
- 1979: Southport
- 1980: Southport
- 1981: Coolangatta
- 1982: Coolangatta
- 1983: Coolangatta
- 1984: Surfers Paradise
- 1985: Palm Beach-Currumbin
- 1986: Labrador
- 1987: Broadbeach
- 1988: Coolangatta
- 1989: Coolangatta
- 1990: Surfers Paradise
- 1991: Labrador
- 1992: Surfers Paradise
- 1993: Labrador
- 1994: Labrador
- 1995: Palm Beach-Currumbin
- 1996: Broadbeach
- 1997: Palm Beach-Currumbin
- 1998: Surfers Paradise
- 1999: Palm Beach-Currumbin

=== Maryborough Australian Football League ===
The Maryborough Australian Football League was an amateur competition that lasted two full seasons in 1981 and 1982. In 1983, there was only a limited number of fixtures, and due to lack of players, the competition folded after the season was over.

In 1983, Biggenden played in both the Bundaberg AFL and the Maryborough competition. Biggenden 2 lost to Cooloola Coast in the 1983 MAFL Grand Final, as their seniors did the previous year.

==== Clubs ====
===== Final =====
| Club | Colours | Nickname | Home Ground | Former League | Est. | Years in MAFL | MAFL Senior Premierships | | Fate |
| Club | Colours | Nickname | Home Ground | Former League | Est. | Years in MAFL | Total | Years | Fate |
|---|---|---|---|---|---|---|---|---|---|
| Biggenden | | Falcons | Biggenden Sportsgrounds, Biggenden | – | 1981 | 1981-1983 | 1 | 1981 | Folded after 1983 season |
| Cooloola Coast | | Dolphins | Lee Lee Park, Tin Can Bay | – | 1982 | 1982-1983 | 2 | 1982, 1983 | Moved to Bundaberg AFL in 1984 |
| Isis | | Hawks | | – | 1981 | 1981-1983 | 0 | - | Folded after 1983 season |
| Maryborough | | Demons | AFL Federation Reserve, Maryborough | BAFL | 1977 | 1981-1983 | 0 | - | Seniors folded, juniors moved to Bundaberg AFL in 1984 |

===== Former =====
| Club | Colours | Nickname | Home Ground | Former League | Est. | Years in MAFL | MAFL Senior Premierships | | Fate |
| Club | Colours | Nickname | Home Ground | Former League | Est. | Years in MAFL | Total | Years | Fate |
|---|---|---|---|---|---|---|---|---|---|
| Torbanlea | | Demons | | – | 1981 | 1981 | 0 | - | Folded after 1981 season |

==== Premiers ====
Maryborough AFL (1981-1983)

- 1981 Biggenden
- 1982 Cooloola Coast
- 1983 Cooloola Coast

=== North West Queensland Australian National Football Association ===
The North West Queensland Australian National Football Association was an amateur competition formed in Mount Isa in the late 1950s. It is considered a forerunner to the modern-day AFL Mount Isa competition. The NWQANFA's brief existence from 1957 to 1960 was cut short by a lack of players owing to industrial disputes in Mount Isa in the 1960s.

==== Clubs ====
===== Final =====
| Club | Colours | Nickname | Home Ground | Est. | Years in NWQANFA | NWQANFA Senior Premierships | | Fate |
| Club | Colours | Nickname | Home Ground | Est. | Years in NWQANFA | Total | Years | Fate |
|---|---|---|---|---|---|---|---|---|
| Australs | | Australs | Star Gully Oval, Soldiers Hill | 1958 | 1958-1960 | 1 | 1958 | Entered recess after 1960 season, merged with Rovers in Mount Isa AFL in 1967 |
| Isa Tigers | | Tigers | Star Gully Oval, Soldiers Hill | 1958 | 1958-1960 | 1 | 1960 | Folded after 1960 season |
| Mary Kathleen | | Magpies | Mary Kathleen Oval, Mary Kathleen | 1957 | 1957-1960 | 1 | 1957 | Entered recess after 1960 season, re-formed in Mount Isa AFL in 1976 |
| Rovers | | Rovers | Star Gully Oval, Soldiers Hill | 1959 | 1959-1960 | 1 | 1959 | Entered recess after 1960 season, merged with Australs in Mount Isa AFL in 1967 |

===== Former =====
| Club | Colours | Nickname | Home Ground | Est. | Years in NWQANFA | NWQANFA Senior Premierships | | Fate |
| Club | Colours | Nickname | Home Ground | Est. | Years in NWQANFA | Total | Years | Fate |
|---|---|---|---|---|---|---|---|---|
| Mount Isa Demons | | Demons | Star Gully Oval, Soldiers Hill | 1957 | 1957 | 0 | - | Folded after 1957 season |

==== Premiers ====
- 1957 Mary Kathleen
- 1958 Australs
- 1959 Rovers
- 1960 Isa Tigers

=== Sunshine Coast Australian Football League ===
The Sunshine Coast Australian Football League was an amateur competition that was formed in 1970 and continued until 1992. The three foundation clubs were Noosa, Maroochydore and Nambour.

In 1993, the clubs from the competition played in the Brisbane Australian Football League, and later split up into various AFL South Queensland Divisions.

==== Clubs ====
===== Final =====
| Club | Colours | Nickname | Home Ground | Former League | Est. | Years in SCAFL | SCAFL Senior Premierships | | Fate |
| Club | Colours | Nickname | Home Ground | Former League | Est. | Years in SCAFL | Total | Years | Fate |
|---|---|---|---|---|---|---|---|---|---|
| Caloundra | (1973-88)(1989-92) | Panthers | Carter Park, Golden Beach | – | 1973 | 1973-1983, 1985-1989, 1991-1992 | 4 | 1987, 1988, 1991, 1992 | Moved to Brisbane AFL in 1993 |
| Gympie | | Cats | Ray Warren Oval, Glanmire | BWBAFL | 1971 | 1971-1983, 1992 | 0 | - | Moved to Wide Bay AFL in 1984. Moved to Bundaberg Wide Bay AFL in 1993 |
| Kawana | | Bears | Kawana Sports Precinct, Bokarina | – | 1983 | 1983-1984, 1990-1992 | 0 | - | Folded after 1992 season |
| Maroochydore | | Roos | Neil Upton Oval, Maroochydore | – | 1969 | 1970-1992 | 11 | 1970, 1971, 1972, 1974, 1978, 1979, 1982, 1983, 1984, 1986, 1989 | Moved to Brisbane AFL in 1993 |
| Nambour | | Blues | G Rae Oval, Palmwoods | – | 1970 | 1970-1975, 1977-1992 | 1 | 1990 | Moved to Brisbane AFL in 1993 |
| Noosa | | Tigers | Noosa Oval, Noosaville | – | 1970 | 1970-1992 | 7 | 1973, 1975, 1976, 1977, 1980, 1985, 1987 | Moved to Brisbane AFL in 1993 |
| Pomona | | Demons | Reserve Street Oval, Pomona | – | 1973 | 1973-1990, 1992 | 0 | - | Played merged with Gympie in 1991. Moved to Bundaberg Wide Bay AFL in 1993 |

===== Former =====
| Club | Colours | Nickname | Home Ground | Former League | Est. | Years in SCAFL | SCAFL Senior Premierships | | Fate |
| Club | Colours | Nickname | Home Ground | Former League | Est. | Years in SCAFL | Total | Years | Fate |
|---|---|---|---|---|---|---|---|---|---|
| Caboolture | | Magpies | Apex Park, Caboolture | – | 1973 | 1973-1975 | 0 | - | Folded after 1975 season |
| Caboolture and Southern Districts | | Bombers | Caboolture Showgrounds, Caboolture | – | 1986 | 1987-1990 | 0 | - | Moved to Brisbane AFL in 1991 |
| Caboolture-Bribie Island | | Sharks | Bribie Island Recreation Reserve, Bongaree | – | 1985 | 1985-1987 | 0 | - | Folded during 1987 season, re-formed as Bribie Island in Brisbane AFL in 1990s |
| Hervey Bay | | Seahawks | N. E. Mclean Oval, Wondunna | BAFL | 1977 | 1978-1981 | 0 | - | Returned to Bundaberg AFL in 1982 |
| Maryborough United | | Demons | AFL Federation Reserve, Maryborough | – | 1977 | 1977 | 0 | - | Moved to Bundaberg AFL in 1979 |
| Mooloolah Valley | | Magpies | | – | 1985 | 1985-1988 | 0 | - | Folded after 1988 season |
| Pomona/Gympie | | Devil Cats | Ray Warren Oval, Glanmire and Reserve Street Oval, Pomona | – | 1991 | 1991 | 0 | - | De-merged into Pomona and Gympie in 1992 |

==== Premiers ====
Sunshine Coast AFL (1970-1992)

- 1970: Maroochydore
- 1971: Maroochydore
- 1972: Maroochydore
- 1973: Noosa
- 1974: Maroochydore
- 1975: Noosa
- 1976: Noosa
- 1977: Noosa
- 1978: Maroochydore
- 1979: Maroochydore
- 1980: Noosa
- 1981: Noosa
- 1982: Maroochydore
- 1983: Maroochydore
- 1984: Maroochydore
- 1985: Noosa
- 1986: Maroochydore
- 1987: Caloundra
- 1988: Caloundra
- 1989: Maroochydore
- 1990: Nambour
- 1991: Caloundra
- 1992: Caloundra

=== Wide Bay Australian Football League ===
The Wide Bay Australian Football League was a short-lived amateur competition that was formed in 1985 as a result of a breakaway from the Bundaberg Australian Football League. It only lasted two years before merging with the league it broke away from.

==== Clubs ====
===== Final =====
| Club | Colours | Nickname | Home Ground | Former League | Est. | Years in SCAFL | SCAFL Senior Premierships | | Fate |
| Club | Colours | Nickname | Home Ground | Former League | Est. | Years in SCAFL | Total | Years | Fate |
|---|---|---|---|---|---|---|---|---|---|
| Cooloola Coast | | Dolphins | Lee Lee Park, Tin Can Bay | BAFL | 1982 | 1985-1986 | 0 | - | Folded after 1986 season |
| Gympie Cats | | Cats | Ray Warren Oval, Glanmire | BAFL | 1971 | 1985-1986 | 0 | - | Formed Bundaberg Wide Bay AFL in 1987 |
| Hervey Bay Bombers | | Bombers | N. E. Mclean Oval, Wondunna | BAFL | 1977 | 1985-1986 | 2 | 1985, 1986 | Formed Bundaberg Wide Bay AFL in 1987 |
| Maryborough | | Tigers | AFL Federation Reserve, Maryborough | BAFL | 1977 | 1986 | 0 | - | Entered recess in 1987, re-formed in Bundaberg Wide Bay AFL in 1988 |

===== Former =====
| Club | Colours | Nickname | Home Ground | Former League | Est. | Years in SCAFL | SCAFL Senior Premierships | | Fate |
| Club | Colours | Nickname | Home Ground | Former League | Est. | Years in SCAFL | Total | Years | Fate |
|---|---|---|---|---|---|---|---|---|---|
| Gympie Blues | | Blues | Ray Warren Oval, Glanmire | – | 1985 | 1985 | 0 | - | Folded after 1985 season |
| Hervey Bay Hawks | | Hawks | N. E. Mclean Oval, Wondunna | – | 1985 | 1985 | 0 | - | Folded after 1985 season |

==== Premiers ====
Wide Bay AFL (1985-1986)

- 1985: Hervey Bay Bombers
- 1986: Hervey Bay Bombers

== See also ==
- Australian Rules football in Queensland
