= AFL Capricornia =

Amateur Australian rules football competition

- Formerly: Rockhampton Football Association; Rockhampton Australian Football Association; Capricornia Australian Football Association; Capricornia Australian Football League
- Association: AFL Queensland
- Classification: Amateur
- Sport: Australian rules football
- Founded: 1969; 57 years ago
- Region: Rockhampton, Gladstone, Livingstone

AFL Capricornia is an amateur Australian rules football competition played across Central Queensland between the months of March to September, which are typically the cooler months of the Queensland climate. Spanning across three main regions of Central Queensland including: Rockhampton, Gladstone and Livingstone. The league is moderately popular despite rugby league being the more favoured football code in Central Queensland.

Traditionally the Grand Final is held in Rockhampton at the Rockhampton Cricket Ground or occasionally at Stenlake Park (last in 2011), however Gladstone has twice held the Grand Final at Clinton Park (2004 & 2015).

== Brief history ==
Rockhampton's first football club, the Rockhampton Football Club was formed by Dr. Roberston under Australian Rules in 1873, making it the third city in the colony after Brisbane and Ipswich to take up the sport. Matches were played on the Rockhampton Cricket Reserve. By the 1880s, there was a full league running in Capricornia. North Rockhampton Football Club and Gladstone Football Club were both founded in 1885. However at the turn of the century, rugby football took hold across most of the state and the Australian rules competitions went into recess.

The existing competition commenced as an informal, social competition, and in 1972 the competition expanded with clubs playing in Rockhampton and Gladstone, and later variously Blackwater, Biloela, Boyne Island and Yeppoon. During the mid to late 1980s, there were eight clubs in the competition.

Since 1994, there have been six clubs in the competition, with all clubs having their own grounds to train and play on. Every club currently is fielding teams in all nine competitions (A-Grade, Reserves, Women's, Under 17, Under 15, Under 13, Under 11, Under 9, & Under 7). It is the only competition in Queensland outside of Cairns and Brisbane to run a full league that includes seniors to juniors at all six clubs.

Following the 1997 season, the neighbouring Central Highlands AFL collapsed leaving the then Capricornia AFL as the sole league for Australian Rules Football in Central Queensland. Since 1998 some fans have talked about the possibility of some former Central Highlands AFL clubs joining AFL Capricornia, however neither the leagues (AFL Capricornia or Central Highlands AFL) or any of their associated clubs have officially commented on the possibility that AFL Capricornia might expand West. Today many of the former Central Highlands AFL clubs still continue to operate, even though they are without a league to play-in, and even run Auskick programs.

The region's representative team originally had colours of yellow, black and white, and were known as the "Taipans". During the reconfiguration of AFL Queensland another representative team closer to Brisbane was given the nickname "Taipans", this forced the AFL Capricornia to choose a different identity. The new colours are dark blue, sky blue and white, and are now known as the "Cyclones"

The Capricornia region has had a few success stories of ex-AFL Capricornia players now playing or have played in the AFL, some players include Zac Smith (Suns, Cats), Paul O'Shea (Bulldogs), Gavin Urquart (Kangaroos).

It was one of the first regional leagues in Queensland to introduce a Women's League. Today in Queensland Women's Leagues are also run by AFL Queensland, AFL Cairns, AFL Mackay, AFL Townsville, AFL Queensland Youth Girls Competition.

The first all women's Australian Football game in this region was played in 1983, with Sisters Roos AFC (Brothers) versus Boyne Island Tannum Sands Saints. The game was played before the seniors game, and the eventual winner was the Sisters Roos. Sisters Roos were also holders of the Champions Cup which was given to the winners of the then pre season challenge. There had been talk of a Women's League starting since 1992, though it took much longer to eventuate, but there were a couple of exhibition games played before the men's senior games in the nineties. AFL Capricornia encourages women and girls to participate in AFL and would like to see a women's or girls League start in the near future. Brothers Roos AFC do have a women's team, named 'The Sisters' but do not yet have an opposing club in the area to play against. In late 2010 the AFL Capricornia Women's League was formed. The format for the season is 5 home & away rounds, plus finals, beginning on 11 July. Matches take part on either Saturday or Sunday Afternoons. AFL Capricornia development officer Stuart Seager said "The games were of a high quality". The competition came about after Boyne Island Tannum Sands Saints AFC player Megan Hunt approached AFLQ and AFL Capricornia on behalf of women who could no longer play in age competitions against males.

The league is covered primarily by the local print media of Rockhampton's Morning Bulletin and Gladston's The Observer. TV highlights are also broadcast weekly on the local news sport segments of WIN News Rockhampton and Seven News Rockhampton. Weekly radio wrap segments are broadcast on the Saturday morning Local Grandstand segment of ABC Capricornia. Many of these may also include occasional interviews with players, coachers, and even league officials.

== Clubs ==
Locations of the AFL Capricornia clubs.

=== Current clubs ===
Club	Colours	Moniker	Ground	Est.	Years in AFL Cap.	Premierships			
Club	Colours	Moniker	Ground	Est.	Years in AFL Cap.	Seniors	Reserves	Women's	Total
B.I.T.S.		Saints	Boyne Island Oval, Boyne Island	1983	1984-	14	14	1	28
Brothers		Roos	Kele Park, West Rockhampton	1981	1982-	6	3	2	11
Gladstone		Suns	Clinton Park, Clinton	1972	1973-	6	2	2	10
Glenmore (Wandal 1968-94)		Bulls	Stenlake Park, Kawana	1973	1973-	8	7	3	18
Rockhampton (Parkhurst 1968-2002)		Panthers	Rockhampton Cricket Ground, The Common	1968	1969-	4	3	0	7
Yeppoon		Swans	Swan Park, Yeppoon	1981	1982-	15	6	1	16

Premierships are correct to the end of the 2016 AFL Capricorina season

=== Former clubs ===
Club	Colours	Moniker	Ground	Est.	Years in League	Premierships				Fate
Club	Colours	Moniker	Ground	Est.	Years in League	Seniors	Reserves	Women's	Total	Fate
All-Blacks				1978	1978	0	N/A	N/A	0	Folded after 1978 season
Allenstown		Rovers	Kettle Park, Allenstown	1968	1969-1972	2	N/A	N/A	2	Folded after 1972 season
Biloela		Bombers	Biloela Cricket Ground, Biloela	1985	1985-1991	0	0	N/A	0	Folded after 1991 season
Blackwater		Cats	Blackwater Cricket Ground, Blackwater	1981	1981-1982	0	0	N/A	0	Formed Central Highlands AFL in 1983
Coast United		Swans	Unknown oval in Yeppoon	1976	1976	0	0	N/A	0	Folded after 1976 season
Depot Hill		Hawks	Bartlem Park, Depot Hill	1968	1969–1972	0	N/A	N/A	0	Folded after 1972 season
Gladstone Brothers				1974	1974	0	N/A	N/A	0	Folded after 1974 season
Institute				1979	1979	0	N/A	N/A	0	Folded after 1979 season
Parkana		Demons	Church Park/Capricorn Country Club, Park Avenue	1976	1976-1992	1	1	0	2	Folded after 1992 season

=== Auskick ===
AFL Capricornia also runs the regions two Auskick divisions, the Capricorn Coast Hub for the Rockhampton Region & the Port Curtis Hub for the Gladstone Region. Auskick focuses on teaching children aged 5 to 12 the basic skills of Australian Rules Football, in a non-contact environment.

==== Capricorn Coast Hub clubs ====
Club	Colours	Moniker	Ground	Est.	Years in AFL Cap.	2026 Season Age Groups			
Club	Colours	Moniker	Ground	Est.	Years in AFL Cap.	Under 7's mixed	Under 9's mixed	Under 11's boys	Under 12's girls
Brothers		Roos	Kele Park, West Rockhampton	1981	1982-	✔	✔	✔	✔
Glenmore (Wandal 1968-94)		Bulls	Stenlake Park, Kawana	1973	1973-	✔	✔	✔	✔
Rockhampton (Parkhurst 1968-2002)		Panthers	Rockhampton Cricket Ground, The Common	1968	1969-	✔	✔	✔	✔
Yeppoon		Swans	Swan Park, Yeppoon	1981	1982-	X	X	X	✔

==== Port Curtis Hub clubs ====
Club	Colours	Moniker	Ground	Est.	Years in AFL Cap.	2026 Season Age Groups		
Club	Colours	Moniker	Ground	Est.	Years in AFL Cap.	Under 7's mixed	Under 9's mixed	Under 11's mixed
B.I.T.S.		Saints	Boyne Island Oval, Boyne Island	1983	1984-	✔	✔	✔
Gladstone		Suns	Clinton Park, Clinton	1972	1973-	✔	✔	✔

== League honours ==
=== Premiers ===
1969–2016

Season	Men's A-Grade	Men's Reserves	Women's	Under 17's	Under 15's	Under 13's
Rockhampton Football Association
1969	Unknown	N/A	N/A	N/A	N/A	N/A
1970	Allenstown	N/A	N/A	N/A	N/A	N/A
1971	Unknown	N/A	N/A	N/A	N/A	N/A
1972	Allenstown	N/A	N/A	N/A	N/A	N/A
Rockhampton Australian Football Association
1973	Gladstone	N/A	N/A	N/A	N/A	N/A
1974	Gladstone	N/A	N/A	N/A	N/A	N/A
1975	Gladstone	N/A	N/A	N/A	N/A	N/A
Capricornia Australian Football Association
1976	Wandal	N/A	N/A	N/A	N/A	N/A
1977	Wandal	N/A	N/A	N/A	N/A	N/A
1978	Wandal	N/A	N/A	N/A	N/A	N/A
1979	Parkana	N/A	N/A	N/A	N/A	N/A
1980	Parkhurst	N/A	N/A	N/A	N/A	N/A
Capricornia Australian Football League
1981	Wandal	N/A	N/A	N/A	N/A	N/A
1982	Gladstone	Brothers	N/A	N/A	N/A	N/A
1983	Gladstone	Parkhurst	Brothers	N/A	N/A	N/A
1984	Brothers	Parkana	N/A	N/A	N/A	N/A
1985	Parkhurst	Yeppoon	N/A	Parkhurst	N/A	N/A
1986	Brothers	Yeppoon	N/A	Unknown	N/A	N/A
1987	Brothers	B.I.T.S.	N/A	Yeppoon	N/A	N/A
1988	Wandal	Wandal	N/A	Unknown	N/A	N/A
1989	Wandal	Wandal	N/A	Unknown	N/A	N/A
1990	Wandal	Wandal	N/A	Unknown	N/A	N/A
1991	Yeppoon	Yeppoon	N/A	Unknown	N/A	N/A
1992	Yeppoon	Wandal	N/A	Unknown	N/A	N/A
1993	Parkhurst	Gladstone	N/A	Unknown	N/A	N/A
1994	B.I.T.S.	Wandal	N/A	Unknown	N/A	N/A
1995	Brothers	Brothers	N/A	Unknown	N/A	N/A
1996	B.I.T.S.	B.I.T.S.	N/A	Unknown	N/A	B.I.T.S.
1997	B.I.T.S.	Yeppoon	N/A	Unknown	N/A	B.I.T.S.
Australian Football League Capricornia
1998	B.I.T.S.	B.I.T.S.	N/A	Unknown	N/A	B.I.T.S.
1999	Yeppoon	B.I.T.S.	N/A	B.I.T.S.	N/A	N/A
2000	B.I.T.S.	B.I.T.S.	N/A	B.I.T.S.	Yeppoon	N/A
2001	B.I.T.S.	B.I.T.S.	N/A	Glenmore	Glenmore ^{1}	N/A
2002	B.I.T.S.	B.I.T.S.	N/A	Glenmore	Glenmore ^{1}	N/A
2003	B.I.T.S.	B.I.T.S.	N/A	Glenmore	Glenmore ^{1}	N/A
2004	Gladstone	Yeppoon	N/A	B.I.T.S.	Glenmore	Yeppoon
2005	Brothers	Glenmore	N/A	B.I.T.S.	Yeppoon	B.I.T.S.
2006	B.I.T.S.	B.I.T.S.	N/A	Unknown	Unknown	Unknown
2007	Rockhampton	Glenmore	N/A	Unknown	Unknown	Unknown
2008	B.I.T.S.	B.I.T.S.	N/A	B.I.T.S.	Gladstone	Yeppoon
2009	Yeppoon	Rockhampton	N/A	Unknown	Unknown	Unknown
2010	Brothers	Brothers	B.I.T.S.	Gladstone	Yeppoon	Gladstone
2011	B.I.T.S.	B.I.T.S.	Gladstone	Yeppoon	Yeppoon	Glenmore
2012	B.I.T.S.	Gladstone	Gladstone	Yeppoon	Gladstone	Glenmore
2013	B.I.T.S.	B.I.T.S.	Glenmore	Yeppoon	Glenmore	B.I.T.S.
2014	Glenmore	B.I.T.S.	Glenmore	Yeppoon	B.I.T.S.	Yeppoon
2015	Yeppoon	Rockhampton	Glenmore	B.I.T.S.	Gladstone	Gladstone
2016	Yeppoon	Panthers	Glenmore	Yeppoon	Yeppoon	B.I.T.S.

Notes:
^{1} Ran as an Under 14's competition.

=== Best & Fairest ===
1969–2016

Season	Men's A-Grade Bernie Gottke Medal	Men's Reserves Graham Orr Medal	Women's Maree Lambert Medal	Under 17's	Under 15's	Under 13's
Rockhampton Football Association
1969	Unknown	N/A	N/A	N/A	N/A	N/A
1970	Unknown	N/A	N/A	N/A	N/A	N/A
1971	Unknown	N/A	N/A	N/A	N/A	N/A
1972	Unknown	N/A	N/A	N/A	N/A	N/A
Rockhampton Australian Football Association
1973	Unknown	N/A	N/A	N/A	N/A	N/A
1974	G.Ward	N/A	N/A	N/A	N/A	N/A
1975	T.Weller	N/A	N/A	N/A	N/A	N/A
Capricornia Australian Football Association
1976	J.McSporran	N/A	N/A	N/A	N/A	N/A
1977	N.White	N/A	N/A	N/A	N/A	N/A
1978	R.Borg	N/A	N/A	N/A	N/A	N/A
1979	M.Cross	N/A	N/A	N/A	N/A	N/A
1980	R.Borg	N/A	N/A	N/A	N/A	N/A
Capricornia Australian Football League
1981	C.Millard	N/A	N/A	N/A	N/A	N/A
1982	A.Herewane	Unknown	N/A	N/A	N/A	N/A
1983	J.Boccomazzo	Unknown	Unknown	N/A	N/A	N/A
1984	R.Pearson	Unknown	N/A	N/A	N/A	N/A
1985	R.Floyd	M.Nunn	N/A	Unknown	N/A	N/A
1986	S.Sargent	B.Lowe	N/A	Unknown	N/A	N/A
1987	D.Bennett	Unknown	N/A	Unknown	N/A	N/A
1988	R.Munday	R.Florence	N/A	Unknown	N/A	N/A
1989	R.Keys	Unknown	N/A	Unknown	N/A	N/A
1990	S.Burns	Unknown	N/A	Unknown	N/A	N/A
1991	G.Diaz ^{1} G.Hickey ^{1}	Unknown	N/A	Unknown	N/A	N/A
1992	T.Carroll	R.Taylor	N/A	Unknown	N/A	N/A
1993	D.Horton ^{1} P.Ugle ^{1}	D.Horton	N/A	Unknown	N/A	N/A
1994	S.Lauritz ^{1} D.Smith ^{1} P.Ugle ^{1}	R.Borg	N/A	Unknown	N/A	N/A
1995	D.Smith	Unknown	N/A	Unknown	N/A	N/A
1996	D.Smith	Unknown	N/A	Unknown	N/A	N/A
1997	W.Clifford	Unknown	N/A	Unknown	N/A	N/A
Australian Football League Capricornia
1998	M.Payne	Unknown	N/A	Unknown	N/A	N/A
1999	D.Boase	Unknown	N/A	Unknown	N/A	N/A
2000	A.Thornberry	M.Payne	N/A	Unknown	N/A	N/A
2001	M.Parker	Unknown	N/A	Unknown	Unknown ^{2}	N/A
2002	W.Hawke ^{1} L.Henschile ^{1} M.Warden ^{1}	Unknown	N/A	Unknown	G.Urquhart ^{2}	N/A
2003	M.Warden	Unknown	N/A	Unknown	Unknown ^{2}	N/A
2004	Q.Allen	Unknown	N/A	J.Magnussen	Unknown	N/A
2005	D.Boase	S.McClure	N/A	Unknown	Unknown	D.Hunt
2006	C.Evans	S.Palma	N/A	Unknown	Unknown	Unknown
2007	L.Kronk	M.Hellyer	N/A	C.Shipard	D.Hunt	J.Cunninghame
2008	B.Burns	Unknown	N/A	S.Nicholls	K.Spark	T.Cossens
2009	W.Hawke ^{1} A.Rusell ^{1}	Unknown	N/A	Unknown	Unknown	Unknown
2010	A.Colbourne	D.Shea	M.Hunt	C.O'Grady	Unknown	Unknown
2011	T.Payne ^{1} A.Rakip ^{1}	L.Moore	E.Aeschlimann	Unknown	Unknown	J.Redsell
2012	M.Wallin	B.Leahy	K.Selhorst	Unknown	Unknown	B.Malkki
2013	D.Hunt	D.Clay	M.Lambart	Unknown	Unknown	A.Miles
2014	T.Cossens	J.Warry	Unknown	Unknown	Unknown	Z.Stevenson
2015	M. Wallin	M. Sulic-Norton	M.Rickertt	Unknown	Unknown	Unknown
2016	T.Higgins	B.Pearce	C.Smith	Unknown	Z.Stevenson	M.Tucker

Notes:
^{1} Medal tied and awarded to both players as joint winners. Joint winners listed in order of surname.
^{2} Ran as an Under 14's competition.

=== Leading goal kickers ===
1969–2015

Season	Men's A-Grade	Men's Reserves	Women's	Under 17's	Under 15's	Under 13's
Rockhampton Football Association
1969	Unknown	N/A	N/A	N/A	N/A	N/A
1970	Unknown	N/A	N/A	N/A	N/A	N/A
1971	Unknown	N/A	N/A	N/A	N/A	N/A
1972	Unknown	N/A	N/A	N/A	N/A	N/A
Rockhampton Australian Football Association
1973	Unknown	N/A	N/A	N/A	N/A	N/A
1974	Unknown	N/A	N/A	N/A	N/A	N/A
1975	Unknown	N/A	N/A	N/A	N/A	N/A
Capricornia Australian Football Association
1976	Unknown	N/A	N/A	N/A	N/A	N/A
1977	Unknown	N/A	N/A	N/A	N/A	N/A
1978	Unknown	N/A	N/A	N/A	N/A	N/A
1979	Unknown	N/A	N/A	N/A	N/A	N/A
1980	Unknown	N/A	N/A	N/A	N/A	N/A
Capricornia Australian Football League
1981	Unknown	N/A	N/A	N/A	N/A	N/A
1982	Unknown	Unknown	N/A	N/A	N/A	N/A
1983	Unknown	Unknown	Unknown	N/A	N/A	N/A
1984	Unknown	Unknown	N/A	N/A	N/A	N/A
1985	Unknown	Unknown	N/A	Unknown	N/A	N/A
1986	Unknown	Unknown	N/A	Unknown	N/A	N/A
1987	Unknown	Unknown	N/A	Unknown	N/A	N/A
1988	Unknown	Unknown	N/A	Unknown	N/A	N/A
1989	Unknown	Unknown	N/A	Unknown	N/A	N/A
1990	Unknown	Unknown	N/A	Unknown	N/A	N/A
1991	Unknown	Unknown	N/A	Unknown	N/A	N/A
1992	Unknown	Unknown	N/A	Unknown	N/A	N/A
1993	(Rockhampton)	Unknown	N/A	Unknown	N/A	N/A
1994	Unknown	Unknown	N/A	Unknown	N/A	N/A
1995		Unknown	N/A	Unknown	N/A	N/A
1996	Unknown	Unknown	N/A	Unknown	N/A	N/A
1997	C.Cowl	Unknown	N/A	Unknown	N/A	N/A
Australian Football League Capricornia
1998	Unknown	Unknown	N/A	Unknown	N/A	N/A
1999	C.Cowl	Unknown	N/A	Unknown	N/A	N/A
2000	Unknown	Unknown	N/A	Unknown	N/A	N/A
2001	Unknown	A.Barrett	N/A	Unknown	Unknown ^{2}	N/A
2002	Unknown	Unknown	N/A	Unknown	Unknown ^{2}	N/A
2003	Unknown	Unknown	N/A	Unknown	Unknown ^{2}	N/A
2004	Unknown	Unknown	N/A	Unknown	Unknown	N/A
2005	C.Ennis	A.Barrett	N/A	Unknown	Unknown	Unknown
2006	D.Boase	S.Johnston	N/A	Unknown	Unknown	Unknown
2007	C.Ennis	D.Bibby	N/A	Unknown	Unknown	Unknown
2008	Unknown	Unknown	N/A	Unknown	Unknown	Unknown
2009	Unknown	Unknown	N/A	Unknown	Unknown	Unknown
2010	A.Colbourne	A.Watkin	Unknown	Unknown	Unknown	Unknown
2011	C.Imrie	M.Goodwin	S.Coles	Unknown	J.Hayne	Unknown
2012	M.Towan	A.Barrett	M.Rickertt ^{1} S.Moreton ^{1}	T.Cossens	J.Hayne	J.Corporaal
2013	R.Sadleir	M.Runnalls	D.Maddick	T.Watson	B.Dempsey	D.Mccorriston
2014	A.Fabian	S.Fowler	S.Rundell	J.Macgregor	A.Miles	T.Dummett
2015	Z.Jahn	S.Gudgeon	O.Dean	B.Anwyl	A.Miles	L.Hope

Notes:
^{1} Medal tied and awarded to both players as joint winners. Joint winners listed in order of surname.
^{2} Ran as an Under 14's competition.

=== National league players ===
Men's

Player	Local Club	VFL/AFL Club	Jumper No.	Drafted	Debut	Years	Games	Goals
Gavin Urquhart	Glenmore AFC	North Melbourne FC	#14	2006: Pick #21	2008: Round 10 vs Brisbane Lions	2008–2012	41	3
Paul O'Shea	Brothers AFC	Western Bulldogs FC	#44	2006: Pick #76	2008: Round 4 vs Essendon	2008-2009	2	0
Zac Smith	Glenmore AFC	Gold Coast FC (2009-2015); Geelong FC (2016–present)	#2 (2009-2015) #9 (2016–present)	2009: Queensland Zone Selection	2011: Round 2 vs Carlton	2011 – present	65 ^{A}	31 ^{A}

Notes:
^{A} Stats correct to the end of the 2015 season.

Women's

Player	Local Club	AFL Women's Club	Jumper No.	Drafted	Debut	Years	Games	Goals
Megan Hunt	Boyne Island-Tannum Sands AFC	Gold Coast Suns WFC	#2	2016: Queensland Zone Selection; Via "University of Queensland"	2016: Game 6 vs Brisbane Lions	2016	1 ^{A}	0
Emma Aeschlimann	Gladstone AFC	Gold Coast Suns WFC	#23	2016: Queensland Zone Selection	2016: Game 6 vs Brisbane Lions	2016	1 ^{A}	0

Notes:
^{A} Played in the 2016 AFL Women's exhibition series. The AFL Women's league was established in June 2016 & will begin in the Summer of 2017 with eight clubs.

=== Inter-League matches ===
A-Grade Men's

Date	Winner	Score	Loser	Score	Ground
25/06/2005	AFL Capricornia (won by 7 points)	N/A	AFL Bundaberg Wide Bay	N/A	Frank Coulthard Oval, Bundaberg, Queensland
30/04/2006	AFL Capricornia	15.14 (104)	AFL Bundaberg Wide Bay	7.11 (53)	Rockhampton Cricket Ground, Rockhampton, Queensland
07/07/2007	AFL Capricornia	17.13 (115)	AFL Bundaberg Wide Bay	10.10 (70)	Keith Dunne Oval, Hervey Bay, Queensland
03/05/2008	AFL Capricornia	17.13 (115)	AFL Bundaberg Wide Bay	12.10 (82)	Boyne Island Oval, Boyne Island, Queensland
13/06/2009	AFL Capricornia	20.19 (139)	AFL Wide Bay	5.3 (33)	Rockhampton, Queensland
01/05/2010	AFL Capricornia	15.10 (100)	AFL Wide Bay	11.5 (71)	Bundaberg, Queensland
09/06/2011	AFL Mackay	9.14 (68)	AFL Capricornia	9.6 (60)	Harrup Park, Mackay, Queensland
01/07/2017	AFL Capricornia	25.15 (165)	AFL Mackay	5.4 (34)	Stenlake Park, Rockhampton, Queensland

Notes: Matches from 1969 to 2004 are unknown, matches played from 2012 to 2016 to be added.

Women's

Date	Winner	Score	Loser	Score	Ground
01/07/2017	AFL Capricornia	7.2 (44)	AFL Mackay	4.6 (30)	Stenlake Park, Rockhampton, Queensland

== Seasons ==
- A Grade Senior Men

Below is a summary of the A Grade Premiership Tables at the end of the home and away fixtures and the Finals results for the most recent seasons of the AFL Capricornia.

=== 1969–2007 ===
To be determined

=== 2008 ===
AFL Capricornia	Wins	Byes	Losses	Draws	For	Against	%	Pts	Final	Team	G	B	Pts	Team	G	B	Pts
Glenmore	9	0	4	2	1312	946	138.69%	40	1st Semi	Panthers	20	17	137	Gladstone	7	11	53
BITS	9	0	5	1	1508	1120	134.64%	38	2nd Semi	BITS	18	8	116	Glenmore	12	9	81
Panthers	8	0	7	0	1150	1071	107.38%	32	Preliminary	Panthers	18	14	122	Glenmore	8	9	57
Gladstone	7	0	7	1	1136	1255	90.52%	30	Grand	BITS	14	7	91	Panthers	8	10	58
Brothers	6	0	9	0	980	1604	61.10%	24									
Yeppoon	4	0	11	0	1121	1211	92.57%	16									

=== 2009 ===
AFL Capricornia	Wins	Byes	Losses	Draws	For	Against	%	Pts	Final	Team	G	B	Pts	Team	G	B	Pts
Yeppoon	13	0	2	0	1446	981	147.40%	52	1st Semi	BITS	14	11	95	Glenmore	11	6	72
Panthers	10	0	5	0	1432	1176	121.77%	40	2nd Semi	Yeppoon	13	13	91	Panthers	9	16	70
Glenmore	7	0	7	1	1314	1123	117.01%	30	Preliminary	BITS	11	9	75	Panthers	10	12	72
BITS	7	0	8	0	1325	1239	106.94%	28	Grand	Yeppoon	18	12	120	BITS	6	11	47
Gladstone	4	0	11	0	923	1487	62.07%	16									
Brothers	3	0	11	1	1099	1533	71.69%	14									

=== 2010 ===
AFL Capricornia	Wins	Byes	Losses	Draws	For	Against	%	Pts	Final	Team	G	B	Pts	Team	G	B	Pts
Brothers	13	0	2	0	1684	1074	156.80%	52	1st Semi	BITS	12	7	79	Panthers	8	12	60
Yeppoon	10	0	5	0	1554	981	158.41%	40	2nd Semi	Brothers	13	8	86	Yeppoon	8	10	58
BITS	6	0	9	0	1290	1318	97.88%	24	Preliminary	BITS	17	7	109	Yeppoon	12	11	83
Panthers	6	0	9	0	1196	1539	77.71%	24	Grand	Brothers	10	16	76	BITS	10	6	66
Gladstone	5	0	10	0	1040	1430	72.73%	20									
Glenmore	5	0	10	0	983	1405	69.96%	20									

=== 2011 ===
AFL Capricornia	Wins	Byes	Losses	Draws	For	Against	%	Pts	Final	Team	G	B	Pts	Team	G	B	Pts
BITS	17	0	0	0	2461	945	260.42%	68	1st Semi	Yeppoon	15	6	96	Gladstone	13	13	91
Glenmore	11	0	6	0	1855	1348	137.61%	44	2nd Semi	BITS	20	15	135	Glenmore	8	8	56
Yeppoon	9	0	9	0	1515	1566	96.74%	36	Preliminary	Yeppoon	14	5	89	Glenmore	9	14	68
Gladstone	5	0	9	2	1343	1544	86.98%	24	Grand	BITS	17	13	115	Yeppoon	9	11	65
Brothers	4	0	9	2	983	1327	74.08%	20									
Panthers	1	0	14	0	744	2171	34.27%	4									

=== 2012 ===
AFL Capricornia	Wins	Byes	Losses	Draws	For	Against	%	Pts	Final	Team	G	B	Pts	Team	G	B	Pts
BITS	12	0	3	0	1852	773	239.59%	48	1st Semi	Gladstone	14	12	96	Yeppoon	6	8	44
Glenmore	11	0	4	0	1296	1060	122.26%	44	2nd Semi	BITS	16	9	105	Glenmore	8	11	59
Gladstone	10	0	5	0	1659	1062	156.21%	40	Preliminary	Gladstone	14	6	90	Glenmore	7	15	57
Yeppoon	6	0	9	0	1004	1114	90.13%	24	Grand	BITS	17	14	116	Gladstone	7	9	51
Panthers	6	0	9	0	1178	1503	78.38%	24									
Brothers	0	0	15	0	624	2101	29.70%	0									

=== 2013 ===
AFL Capricornia	Wins	Byes	Losses	Draws	For	Against	%	Pts	Final	Team	G	B	Pts	Team	G	B	Pts
BITS	13	0	2	0	1727	892	193.61%	52	1st Semi	Glenmore	20	14	134	Panthers	5	3	33
Yeppoon	13	0	2	0	1468	781	187.96%	52	2nd Semi	BITS	17	13	115	Yeppoon	10	6	66
Glenmore	9	0	6	0	1342	1114	120.47%	36	Preliminary	Glenmore	10	5	65	Yeppoon	6	13	49
Panthers	6	0	9	0	1159	1220	95.00%	24	Grand	BITS	12	7	79	Glenmore	5	7	37
Gladstone	3	0	12	0	959	1247	76.90%	12									
Brothers	1	0	14	0	747	2148	34.80%	4									

=== 2014 ===
AFL Capricornia	Wins	Byes	Losses	Draws	For	Against	%	Pts	Final	Team	G	B	Pts	Team	G	B	Pts
Glenmore	13	0	2	0	1747	712	245.37%	52	1st Semi	BITS	18	17	125	Panthers	4	3	27
Yeppoon	12	0	3	0	1724	735	234.56%	48	2nd Semi	Glenmore	14	10	94	Yeppoon	10	9	69
BITS	10	0	5	0	1298	922	140.78%	40	Preliminary	Yeppoon	14	11	95	BITS	10	10	70
Panthers	5	0	10	0	992	1351	73.43%	20	Grand	Glenmore	13	5	83	Yeppoon	7	5	47
Gladstone	3	0	12	0	984	1626	60.52%	12									
Brothers	2	0	13	0	642	2041	31.46%	8									

== 2015 Ladder ==
AFL Capricornia	Wins	Byes	Losses	Draws	For	Against	%	Pts	Final	Team	G	B	Pts	Team	G	B	Pts
Yeppoon	14	0	1	0	1950	575	339.13%	56	1st Semi	Glenmore	9	13	67	Panthers	9	9	63
BITS	11	0	4	0	1324	902	146.78%	44	2nd Semi	Yeppoon	17	15	117	BITS	5	11	41
Glenmore	8	0	7	0	862	945	91.22%	32	Preliminary	BITS	17	7	109	Glenmore	5	12	42
Panthers	4	0	10	1	877	1345	65.20%	18	Grand	Yeppoon	22	15	147	BITS	7	5	47
Gladstone	4	0	11	0	918	1334	68.82%	16									
Brothers	3	0	11	1	851	1681	50.62%	14									

== 2016 Ladder ==
AFL Capricornia	Wins	Byes	Losses	Draws	For	Against	%	Pts	Final	Team	G	B	Pts	Team	G	B	Pts
Yeppoon	14	0	0	1	2059	450	457.56%	58	1st Semi	BITS	13	10	88	Glenmore	11	7	73
Gladstone	10	0	4	1	1378	984	140.04%	42	2nd Semi	Yeppoon	22	13	145	Gladstone	4	5	29
Glenmore	10	0	4	1	1138	892	127.58%	42	Preliminary	Gladstone	14	11	95	BITS	12	13	85
BITS	5	0	9	1	919	980	93.78%	22	Grand	Yeppoon	16	21	117	Gladstone	8	3	51
Panthers	2	0	12	1	655	1416	46.26%	10									
Brothers	1	0	13	1	632	2059	30.69%	6									

== 2017 Ladder ==
AFL Capricornia	Wins	Byes	Losses	Draws	For	Against	%	Pts	Final	Team	G	B	Pts	Team	G	B	Pts
Yeppoon	15	0	0	0	2336	344	679.07%	60	1st Semi	Panthers	21	11	137	Brothers	7	4	46
BITS	10	0	5	0	1342	840	159.76%	40	2nd Semi	Yeppoon	15	13	103	BITS	4	4	28
Panthers	8	0	7	0	979	1619	60.47%	32	Preliminary	BITS	16	12	108	Panthers	8	10	58
Brothers	6	0	9	0	993	1753	56.65%	24	Grand	Yeppoon	19	14	128	BITS	6	3	39
Gladstone	3	0	12	0	956	1518	62.98%	12									
Glenmore	3	0	12	0	871	1403	62.08%	12									

== AFL Capricornia Grand Final results ==
=== The First Rockhampton A Grade Australian Football Grand Final ===
Year	Premiers	Score	Runners up	Score
1972	Allenstown All Blacks	12.14 (96)	Depot Hill Hawks	13.7 (95)

=== Recent A Grade Grand Final results ===
Year	Premiers	Score	Runners Up	Score
2006	Boyne Island Tannum Sands Saints	10.9 (69)	Brothers Rockhampton Kangaroos	6.5 (41)
2007	Rockhampton Panthers	16.9 (105)	Boyne Island Tannum Sands Saints	13.5 (83)
2008	Boyne Island Tannum Sands Saints	14.7 (91)	Rockhampton Panthers	8.10 (58)
2009	Yeppoon Swans	18.12 (120)	Boyne Island Tannum Sands Saints	6.11 (47)
2010	Brothers Rockhampton Kangaroos	10.16 (76)	Boyne Island Tannum Sands Saints	10.6 (66)
2011	Boyne Island Tannum Sands Saints	17.13 (115)	Yeppoon Swans	9.11 (65)
2012	Boyne Island Tannum Sands Saints	17.14 (116)	Gladstone Mudcrabs	7.9 (51)
2013	Boyne Island Tannum Sands Saints	12.7 (79)	Glenmore Bulls	5.7 (37)
2014	Glenmore Bulls	13.5 (83)	Yeppoon Swans	7.5 (47)
2015	Yeppoon Swans	22.15 (147)	Boyne Island Tannum Sands Saints	7.5 (47)
2016	Yeppoon Swans	16.21 (117)	Gladstone Suns	8.3 (51)
2017	Yeppoon Swans	19.14 (128)	Boyne Island Tannum Sands Saints	6.3 (39)
2018	Yeppoon Swans	12.15 (87)	Glenmore Bulls	5.6 (36)
2019	Yeppoon Swans	18.11 (119)	Rockhampton Panthers	7.5 (47)
2020	Yeppoon Swans	10.10 (70)	Boyne Island Tannum Sands Saints	1.3 (9)

=== Recent Reserve Grade Grand Final results ===
Year	Premiers	Score	Runners Up	Score
2006	Yeppoon Swans	11.8 (74)	Gladstone Mudcrabs	5.7 (37)
2007	Glenmore Bulls	10.6 (66)	Rockhampton Panthers	6.10 (46)
2008	Boyne Island Tannum Sands Saints	13.8 (86)	Rockhampton Panthers	12.7 (79)
2009	Rockhampton Panthers	10.13 (73)	Yeppoon Swans	7.4 (46)
2010	Brothers Rockhampton	13.7 (85)	Boyne Island Tannum Sands Saints	7.3 (45)
2011	Boyne Island Tannum Sands Saints	11.11 (77)	Brothers Rockhampton Kangaroos	5.2 (32)
2012	Gladstone Mudcrabs	9.6 (60)	Boyne Island Tannum Sands Saints	4.2 (26)
2013	Boyne Island Tannum Sands Saints	13.10 (88)	Gladstone Mudcrabs	6.9 (45)
2014	Boyne Island Tannum Sands Saints	14.5 (89)	Glenmore Bulls	8.3 (51)
2015	Rockhampton Panthers	10.6 (66)	Gladstone Mudcrabs	6.6 (42)
2016	Rockhampton Panthers	15.9 (99)	Gladstone Suns	6.4 (40)
2017	Boyne Island Tannum Sands Saints	12.13 (85)	Yeppoon Swans	4.6 (30)
2018	Boyne Island Tannum Sands Saints	9.9 (63)	Yeppoon Swans	8.5 (53)
2019	Yeppoon Swans	24.6 (150)	Boyne Island Tannum Sands Saints	5.5 (35)
2020	Yeppoon Swans	5.7 (37)	Boyne Island Tannum Sands Saints	4.3 (27)

== See also ==
- Australian Rules football in Queensland
- Rockhampton District Rugby League
- Gladstone District Rugby League
