= Paul O'Shea =

Australian rules footballer

Paul O'Shea (born 5 April 1989) is a former professional Australian rules footballer who was drafted by the Western Bulldogs in the Australian Football League before his career was halted by a serious hip injury and glandular fever.

O'Shea was drafted by the Bulldogs in the 2006 AFL draft, while playing for AFL Queensland club Redland.

During his time with the Bulldogs, O'Shea played for Werribee and Williamstown Football Clubs in the Victorian Football League (VFL) due to the Bulldogs' VFL club alignment changing. He then went on to play for the North Launceston Bombers in the Tasmanian State League and the Wyndhamvale Falcons in the Western Region Football League.

== Early career ==
O'Shea played both rugby league and Australian rules football in the Central Queensland city of Rockhampton where he played in the junior AFL Capricornia competition for Rockhampton Brothers Football Club, although it wasn't until he was in Year 8 he began playing the sport when he decided to take the advice of a physical education teacher. He went on to represent the Capricornia Under 14's team before being selected in the Australia Post Country Kookaburras team for the state Under 16's Championships in Brisbane. However, he fell ill two days prior to the carnival and didn't play.

In 2006, he played for the Australia Post Country Kookaburra's Under 18's state championships. O'Shea's performance earned him a game in the reserves side for the Brisbane Lions for the first round of the AFL Queensland State League competition, playing against Labrador at The Gabba. During that match, he inadvertently passed the ball to an opposing player who ran with it to an unattended goal. Footage of the mistake was played during the "Almost Footy Legends" segment on the Nine Network's The AFL Footy Show.

Despite this, a Redland scout was impressed with O'Shea's skills and invited him and O'Shea eventually accepted an offer to move to Brisbane for the last twelve games.
