= AFL Wide Bay =

Australian rules football governing body

- Most recent season or competition: 2024 AFL Queensland season
- Formerly: Bundaberg Wide Bay AFL
- Sport: Australian rules football
- Founded: 1987
- No. of teams: 6
- Country: Australia
- Most recent champion: Hervey Bay Bombers (2025)
- Most titles: Hervey Bay Bombers (20)
- Website: AFL Wide Bay

The AFL Wide Bay is a regional body that coordinates Australian rules football competitions in the Wide Bay–Burnett and northern Sunshine Coast regions of Queensland, Australia. The competition currently features teams from the cities of Bundaberg, Maryborough, Hervey Bay, and Gympie. AFL Wide Bay operates men's senior, reserves and women's competitions as well as underage competitions including mixed and junior boys teams.

Beginning as the Bundaberg-Wide Bay Australian Football League in 1987 through the merger of the "Bundaberg Australian Football League" and "Wide Bay Australian Football League". The competition was temporarily managed by AFL Queensland as part of its South East Queensland structure for the 2017 season before resuming under the current banner in 2018.

The representative team was known as the "Tigers", wearing guernseys similar to those of the Richmond Tigers.

== AFL Wide Bay origins: the merger ==
In 1985, the WBAFL played a five team competition which included teams from Hervey Bay (2), Cooloola Coast and Gympie (2), with Maryborough fielding junior grades. The BAFL played a four team competition which included the three main clubs, Wests, Norths, and Souths (2) with Burnett Heads fielding Reserves and juniors only.

In 1986, the WBAFL played a four team competition, but finished the season with just two clubs, Hervey Bay and Gympie, who fielded just one senior club each that year. Maryborough and Cooloola Coast folded. The BAFL had only three senior teams, Wests, Norths and Souths (with Souths fielding just one A Grade team that year only), and so with backing of the Queensland Australian Football League, the two Leagues merged.

In 1987, the Bundaberg Wide Bay Australian Football League was formed with the five remaining senior clubs, Hervey Bay, Gympie, Norths, Wests and Souths, and the addition of Burnett Heads for a few senior games, before being relegated to the Reserves after five rounds.

In 1988, Maryborough joined the competition to resume a six team competition.

== Clubs ==
Locations of the teams home grounds (Yellow = Reserves only)

Club	Colours	Nickname	Home ground	Former league	Est.	Years in WBAFL	WBAFL Senior Premierships	
Club	Colours	Nickname	Home ground	Former league	Est.	Years in WBAFL	Total	Years
Across The Waves		Eagles	Frank Coulthard Oval, Norville	–	1997	1997-	11	1997, 1998, 1999, 2001, 2006, 2008, 2011, 2014, 2015, 2016, 2020
Bay Power		Power	Keith Dunne Oval, Urangan	–	2004	2004-	1	2019
Brothers Bulldogs (West Bundaberg 1987-96)		Bulldogs	Brothers Sporting Complex, Kensington	BAFL	1972	1987-	3	1987, 1995, 2010
Hervey Bay Bombers		Bombers	N. E. Mclean Oval, Wondunna	WBAFL	1977	1987-	21	1988, 1989, 1990, 1991, 1992, 1994, 1996, 2000, 2002, 2004, 2005, 2007, 2009, 2012, 2013, 2021, 2022, 2023, 2024, 2025, 2026
Reserve Grade Only
Maryborough		Bears	AFL Federation Reserve, Maryborough	WBAFL	1977	1988, 1990-1991, 1993-1999, 2001-2012, 2015-2017, 2019-2021, 2023-	0	–

=== Former Senior Teams ===
Club	Colours	Moniker	Home Ground	Former League	Est.	Years in WBAFL	WBAFL Senior Premierships		Fate
Club	Colours	Moniker	Home Ground	Former League	Est.	Years in WBAFL	Total	Years	Fate
Burnett Heads		Saints	Jack Norgate Oval, Burnett Heads	BAFL	1972	1987	0	-	Folded after 1987 season
Fraser Coast	(1992-96)(1997-2000)	Magpies	Keith Dunne Oval, Urangan	–	1992	1992-2000	1	1993	Folded after 2000 season
Gympie		Cats	Ray Warren Oval, Glanmire	WBAFL, SCAFL, QFA	1971	1987-1989, 1993-1999, 2004-2006, 2018	1	2018	Recess in 1990, re-formed in Sunshine Coast AFL in 1992. Moved to Queensland FA in 2000 and 2007
North Bundaberg		Kangaroos	Kendall Flat, Bundaberg East	BAFL	1972	1987-1996	0	-	Merged with South Bundaberg to form Across The Waves (ATW) in 1997
Pomona		Demons	Pomona Oval, Pomona	SCAFL, QFA	1973	1993-1996, 2004-2006, 2024-2025	0	-	Recess from 1997-2003. Moved to QFA in 2007 and 2026
South Bundaberg		Magpies	Frank Coulthard Oval, Norville	BAFL	1972	1987-1996	0	-	Merged with North Bundaberg to form Across The Waves (ATW) in 1997

== A Grade Senior Premiers ==
Bundaberg Wide Bay AFL

- 1987 West Bundaberg Bulldogs
- 1988 Hervey Bay Bombers
- 1989 Hervey Bay Bombers
- 1990 Hervey Bay Bombers
- 1991 Hervey Bay Bombers
- 1992 Hervey Bay Bombers
- 1993 Fraser Coast Lions
- 1994 Hervey Bay Bombers
- 1995 West Bundaberg Bulldogs
- 1996 Hervey Bay Bombers
- 1997 ATW Bundaberg Eagles
- 1998 ATW Bundaberg Eagles
- 1999 ATW Bundaberg Eagles

AFL Bundaberg Wide Bay

- 2000 Hervey Bay Bombers
- 2001 ATW Bundaberg Eagles
- 2002 Hervey Bay Bombers
- 2003 In recess
- 2004 Hervey Bay Bombers
- 2005 Hervey Bay Bombers
- 2006 ATW Bundaberg Eagles
- 2007 Hervey Bay Bombers
- 2008 ATW Bundaberg Eagles

AFL Wide Bay

- 2009 Hervey Bay Bombers
- 2010 Brothers Bulldogs
- 2011 ATW Bundaberg Eagles
- 2012 Hervey Bay Bombers
- 2013 Hervey Bay Bombers
- 2014 ATW Bundaberg Eagles
- 2015 ATW Bundaberg Eagles
- 2016 ATW Bundaberg Eagles
- 2017 In recess
- 2018 Gympie Cats
- 2019 Bay Power
- 2020 ATW Bundaberg Eagles
- 2021 Hervey Bay Bombers
- 2022 Hervey Bay Bombers
- 2023 Hervey Bay Bombers
- 2024 Hervey Bay Bombers
- 2025 Hervey Bay Bombers

=== Years in recess: 2003 and 2017 summary ===
In 2003, four out of the eight clubs that played in a Brisbane League Division Three, were from AFL Bundaberg Wide Bay. They were Hervey Bay Bombers, Maryborough Bears, Across The Waves Bundaberg, and Brothers Bulldogs from Bundaberg. Gympie Cats and Pomona Demons had also previously played in the Wide Bay League. It was a competition which lasted only one season before the above mentioned six clubs, with the addition of new club, Bay Power, resulted in a revamped seven club League reforming the AFL Bundaberg Wide Bay competition the following year.

Hervey Bay Bombers won the Division Three Flag in 2003 beating ATW Bundaberg Eagles, with Maryborough Bears finishing third. The other two clubs in the competition were Bribie Island Bulldogs and Glasshouse Lions.

In 2017, a very similar set up to the 2003 Season took place. Hervey Bay Bombers, Across The Waves Bundaberg, Brothers Bulldogs and Bay Power, joined Sunshine Coast clubs, Maroochydore Roos, Gympie Cats and Pomona Demons, to form QFA Wide Bay-Sunshine Coast for just one season. Maroochydore Roos defeated Brothers Bulldogs in the Grand Final, played at Gympie. The AFL Wide Bay Reserves and Youth/Junior Grades continued under the banner of AFL Wide Bay. Gympie returned to play in the AFL Wide Bay competition in 2018, before leaving the competition once again.

== 2009 AFL Wide Bay Ladder and Finals Results ==
AFL Wide Bay	Wins	Byes	Losses	Draws	For	Against	%	Pts	Final	Team	G	B	Pts	Team	G	B	Pts
Brothers Bulldogs	15	4	1	0	1611	803	200.62%	76	1st Semi	Across The Waves	13	8	86	Bay Power	9	9	63
Hervey Bay Bombers	9	4	7	0	1538	1140	134.91%	52	2nd Semi	Brothers Bulldogs	14	7	91	Hervey Bay Bombers	12	18	90
Across The Waves	8	4	7	1	1576	1038	151.83%	50	Preliminary	Hervey Bay Bombers	20	16	136	Across The Waves	6	6	42
Bay Power	7	4	8	1	1420	1308	108.56%	46	Grand	Hervey Bay Bombers	15	12	102	Brothers Bulldogs	10	7	67
Maryborough	0	4	16	0	390	2246	17.36%	16									

== 2010 AFL Wide Bay Ladder and Finals Results ==
AFL Wide Bay	Wins	Byes	Losses	Draws	For	Against	%	Pts	Final	Team	G	B	Pts	Team	G	B	Pts
Across The Waves	15	0	1	0	1809	722	250.55%	60	1st Semi	Brothers Bulldogs	30	19	199	Bay Power	2	2	14
Hervey Bay Bombers	12	0	4	0	1750	754	232.10%	48	2nd Semi	Across The Waves	15	7	97	Hervey Bay Bombers	11	10	76
Brothers Bulldogs	9	0	7	0	1746	1133	154.10%	36	Preliminary	Brothers Bulldogs	17	11	113	Hervey Bay Bombers	12	13	85
Bay Power	2	0	14	0	840	1801	46.64%	8	Grand	Brothers Bulldogs	10	8	68	Across The Waves	7	16	58
Maryborough	2	0	14	0	546	2281	23.94%	8									

== 2011 AFL Wide Bay Ladder and Finals Results ==
AFL Wide Bay	Wins	Byes	Losses	Draws	For	Against	%	Pts	Final	Team	G	B	Pts	Team	G	B	Pts
Across The Waves	15	4	0	1	2095	509	411.59%	78	1st Semi	Hervey Bay Bombers	12	10	82	Bay Power	8	16	64
Brothers Bulldogs	8	4	7	1	1205	1168	103.17%	50	2nd Semi	Across The Waves	14	9	93	Brothers Bulldogs	9	5	59
Bay Power	6	4	9	1	1109	1291	85.90%	42	Preliminary	Hervey Bay Bombers	14	11	95	Brothers Bulldogs	7	9	51
Hervey Bay Bombers	6	4	9	1	969	1320	73.41%	42	Grand	Across The Waves	20	8	128	Hervey Bay Bombers	9	7	61
Maryborough	3	4	13	0	875	1965	44.53%	28									

== 2012 AFL Wide Bay Ladder and Finals Results ==
AFL Wide Bay	Wins	Byes	Losses	Draws	For	Against	%	Pts	Final	Team	G	B	Pts	Team	G	B	Pts
Hervey Bay Bombers	15	4	0	1	2000	383	522.19	62	1st Semi	Across The Waves	23	12	150	Maryborough	6	10	46
Brothers Bulldogs	11	4	5	0	1263	1178	107.22	44	2nd Semi	Hervey Bay Bombers	16	18	114	Brothers Bulldogs	6	8	44
Across The Waves	8	4	7	1	1394	1080	129.07	34	Preliminary	Across The Waves	13	8	86	Brothers Bulldogs	6	7	43
Maryborough	3	4	12	1	768	1937	39.65	14	Grand	Hervey Bay Bombers	11	14	80	Across The Waves	10	10	70
Bay Power	1	4	14	1	773	1620	47.72	6									

== 2013 Ladder ==
AFL Wide Bay	Wins	Byes	Losses	Draws	For	Against	%	Pts	Final	Team	G	B	Pts	Team	G	B	Pts
Across The Waves	12	0	3	0	1454	1127	129.02%	48	Semi	Hervey Bay Bombers	23	17	155	Brothers Bulldogs	6	7	43
Hervey Bay Bombers	11	0	4	0	1561	988	158.00%	44	Grand	Hervey Bay Bombers	22	11	143	Across The Waves	9	10	64
Brothers Bulldogs	4	0	11	0	1019	1439	70.81%	16									
Bay Power	3	0	12	0	1038	1518	68.38%	12									

== 2014 Ladder ==
AFL Wide Bay	Wins	Byes	Losses	Draws	For	Against	%	Pts	Final	Team	G	B	Pts	Team	G	B	Pts
Hervey Bay Bombers	14	0	2	0	2001	679	294.70%	56	Semi	Across The Waves	15	11	101	Brothers Bulldogs	7	7	49
Across The Waves	12	0	4	0	1473	1115	132.11%	48	Grand	Across The Waves	14	16	100	Hervey Bay Bombers	10	6	66
Brothers Bulldogs	5	0	11	0	853	1640	52.01%	20									
Bay Power	3	0	13	0	941	1720	54.71%	12									
Maroochydore Roos	1	0	1	0	192	128	150.00%	4									
Gympie	0	0	1	0	71	89	79.78%	0									
Pomona	0	0	2	0	68	119	57.14%	0									
Glasshouse Hinterland	0	0	1	0	23	132	17.42%	0									

== 2015 Ladder ==
AFL Wide Bay	Wins	Byes	Losses	Draws	For	Against	%	Pts	Final	Team	G	B	Pts	Team	G	B	Pts
Across The Waves	12	0	2	0	1806	751	240.48%	48	Preliminary	Brothers Bulldogs	19	20	134	Hervey Bay Bombers	9	13	67
Hervey Bay Bombers	7	0	7	0	1118	1228	91.04%	28	Grand	Across The Waves	17	9	111	Brothers Bulldogs	14	13	97
Brothers Bulldogs	7	0	7	0	1173	1232	95.21%	28									
Bay Power	4	0	10	0	799	1426	56.03%	16									

== 2016 Ladder ==
AFL Wide Bay	Wins	Byes	Losses	Draws	For	Against	%	Pts	Final	Team	G	B	Pts	Team	G	B	Pts
Across The Waves	12	0	4	0	1794	997	179.94%	48	Preliminary	Bay Power	13	14	92	Hervey Bay Bombers	9	11	65
Hervey Bay Bombers	11	0	5	0	1437	1190	120.76%	44	Grand	Across The Waves	13	15	93	Bay Power	11	7	73
Bay Power	8	0	8	0	1302	1448	89.92%	32									
Brothers Bulldogs	4	0	12	0	1083	1515	71.49%	16									

== AFL Wide Bay A Grade Senior Mens Grand Finals ==
Year	Premiers	Score	Runners up	Score	Venue
1987	West Bundaberg Bulldogs	12.12 (84)	Hervey Bay Bombers	7.14 (56)	Frank Coulthard Oval, Bundaberg
1988	Hervey Bay Bombers	17.17 (119)	West Bundaberg Bulldogs	9.15 (69)	Faircloth Oval, Bundaberg
1989	Hervey Bay Bombers	10.19 (79)	West Bundaberg Bulldogs	10.12 (72)	Dundowran Oval, Hervey Bay
1990	Hervey Bay Bombers	21.18 (144)	West Bundaberg Bulldogs	9.9 (63)	Faircloth Oval, Bundaberg
1991	Hervey Bay Bombers	9.9 (63)	West Bundaberg Bulldogs	8.7 (55)	N.E. Mclean Oval, Hervey Bay
1992	Hervey Bay Bombers	12.10 (82)	South Bundaberg Magpies	11.10 (76)	Faircloth Oval, Bundaberg
1993	Fraser Coast Lions	14.10 (94)	South Bundaberg Magpies	10.14 (74)	N.E. McLean Oval, Hervey Bay
1994	Hervey Bay Bombers	13.8 (86)	South Bundaberg Magpies	10.14 (74)	N.E. McLean Oval, Hervey Bay
1995	West Bundaberg Bulldogs	10.6 (66)	South Bundaberg Magpies	8.8 (56)	Faircloth Oval, Bundaberg
1996	Hervey Bay Bombers	12.5 (77)	Maryborough Bears	9.10 (64)	Newtown Oval, Maryborough
1997	ATW Bundaberg Eagles	15.13 (103)	Fraser Coast Magpies	10.16 (76)	N.E. McLean Oval, Hervey Bay
1998	ATW Bundaberg Eagles	12.8 (80)	Gympie Cats	7.6 (48)	Faircloth Oval, Bundaberg
1999	ATW Bundaberg Eagles	10.14 (74)	Hervey Bay Bombers	3.8 (26)	Frank Coulthard Oval, Bundaberg
2000	Hervey Bay Bombers	10.7 (67)	ATW Bundaberg Eagles	4.12 (36)	N.E. McLean Oval, Hervey Bay
2001	ATW Bundaberg Eagles	17.12 (114)	Hervey Bay Bombers	7.11 (53)	N.E. McLean Oval, Hervey Bay
2002	Hervey Bay Bombers	16.12 (108)	ATW Bundaberg Eagles	7.11 (53)	Faircloth Oval, Bundaberg
*2003*	*HERVEY BAY BOMBERS	8.8 (56)	*ATW BUNDABERG EAGLES	6.17 (53)	N.E.McLEAN OVAL, HERVEY BAY
2004	Hervey Bay Bombers	17.12 (114)	ATW Bundaberg Eagles	8.7 (55)	Frank Coulthard Oval, Bundaberg
2005	Hervey Bay Bombers	17.13 (115)	ATW Bundaberg Eagles	9.11 (65)	Keith Dunne Oval, Hervey Bay
2006	ATW Bundaberg Eagles	19.14 (128)	Hervey Bay Bombers	14.15 (99)	Ocean Reef Park, Maryborough
2007	Hervey Bay Bombers	17.15 (117)	ATW Bundaberg Eagles	8.5 (53)	Faircloth Oval, Bundaberg
2008	ATW Bundaberg Eagles	15.15 (105)	Hervey Bay Bombers	15.13 (103)	Frank Coulthard Oval, Bundaberg
2009	Hervey Bay Bombers	15.12 (102)	Brothers Bulldogs	10.7 (67)	N.E. McLean Oval, Hervey Bay
2010	Brothers Bulldogs	10.8 (68)	ATW Bundaberg Eagles	7.16 (58)	Keith Dunne Oval, Hervey Bay
2011	ATW Bundaberg Eagles	20.8 (128)	Hervey Bay Bombers	9.7 (61)	Ocean Reef Park, Maryborough
2012	Hervey Bay Bombers	11.14 (80)	ATW Bundaberg Eagles	10.10 (70)	Faircloth Oval, Bundaberg
2013	Hervey Bay Bombers	22.11 (143)	ATW Bundaberg Eagles	9.10 (64)	Frank Coulthard Oval, Bundaberg
2014	ATW Bundaberg Eagles	14.16 (100)	Hervey Bay Bombers	10.6 (66)	N.E. McLean Oval, Hervey Bay
2015	ATW Bundaberg Eagles	17.9 (111)	Brothers Bulldogs	14.13 (97)	Keith Dunne Oval, Hervey Bay
2016	ATW Bundaberg Eagles	13.15 (93)	Bay Power	11.7 (73)	Brothers AFL Reserve, Bundaberg
*2017*	MAROOCHYDORE ROOS	20.12 (132)	BROTHERS BULLDOGS	5.6 (36)	RAY WARREN OVAL, GYMPIE
2018	Gympie Cats	14.11 (95)	Hervey Bay Bombers	10.4 (64)	N.E. McLean Oval, Hervey Bay
2019	Bay Power	7.16 (58)	Hervey Bay Bombers	3.5 (23)	Keith Dunne Oval, Hervey Bay
2020	ATW Bundaberg Eagles	10.7 (67)	Bay Power	10.4 (64)	Frank Coulthard Oval, Bundaberg
2021	Hervey Bay Bombers	9.10 (64)	Bay Power	2.2 (14)	Port City Park, Maryborough
2022	Hervey Bay Bombers	13.6 (84)	Brothers Bulldogs	7.7 (49)	Brothers Sports Ground, Bundaberg
2023	Hervey Bay Bombers	6.11 (47)	Brothers Bulldogs	5.3 (33)	N.E. McLean Oval, Hervey Bay
2024	Hervey Bay Bombers	5.8 (38)	Bay Power	2.11 (23)	Keith Dunne Oval, Hervey Bay
2025	Hervey Bay Bombers	15.6 (96)	Bay Power	8.7 (55)	Frank Coulthard Oval, Bundaberg

NOTE: In both seasons of 2003 and 2017 all of the AFL Bundaberg Wide Bay Clubs participated in a Brisbane Competition before resuming the Regional League the following year.

=== AFL Wide Bay A Grade Senior Mens Grand Final Summary List 1987-2025 ===
Club	Seasons	Grand Finals	Premiers	Runners up
Hervey Bay Bombers	37	29	20	9
Across The Waves Bundaberg Eagles	27	19	11	8
Brothers Bulldogs (West Bundaberg)	37	11	3	8
Fraser Coast Lions/Magpies	9	2	1	1
South Bundaberg (ATW Magpies)	10	4	0	4
Maryborough Bears (Formerly Tigers)	24	1	0	1
Gympie Cats	14	2	1	1
North Bundaberg Kangaroos	10	0	0	0
Bay Power	21	6	1	5
Pomona Demons	9	0	0	0

== AFL Wide Bay Best and Fairest Award (Stedman Medal) ==
Year	Stedman Medal Winner	Club
1987	Darren Hunter	Hervey Bay Bombers
1988	John Turnbull	Hervey Bay Bombers
1989	Paul Longley	West Bundaberg Bulldogs
1990	Gavin Rowe	West Bundaberg Bulldogs
1991	John Turnbull	Hervey Bay Bombers
1992	Doug Maxwell	Fraser Coast Lions
1993	Rory Chapple	Fraser Coast Lions
1994	Shannon Schonnewille	Maryborough Tigers
1995	David Ward	West Bundaberg Bulldogs
1996	Scott Banfield (TIED)	Hervey Bay Bombers
1996	Grant Staunton (TIED)	Hervey Bay Bombers
1997	Grant Staunton	Hervey Bay Bombers
1998	Angus Nevin	Gympie Cats
1999	Anthony McDonald	Fraser Coast Magpies
2000	Josh Charles	Hervey Bay Bombers
2001	Josh Charles	Hervey Bay Bombers
2002	Jason Hodgkinson	Brothers Bulldogs
*2003*	Darrel Leech	Hervey Bay Bombers
2004	Will Connally	Hervey Bay Bombers
2005	Matty Stevens	Across The Waves Bundaberg Eagles
2006	Matty Stevens	Across The Waves Bundaberg Eagles
2007	Shannon Beavis	Maryborough Bears
2008	Hayden Anderson	Across The Waves Bundaberg Eagles
2009	Justin Sheehan	Brothers Bulldogs
2010	Brendan Murchie (TIED)	Across The Waves Bundaberg Eagles
2010	Shaun Stone (TIED)	Across The Waves Bundaberg Eagles
2011	Michael Liverton	Across The Waves Bundaberg Eagles
2012	Brad Richards	Hervey Bay Bombers
2013	Dean Backwell	Bay Power
2014	Brad Richards	Hervey Bay Bombers
2015	Michael Blair	Across The Waves Bundaberg Eagles
2016	Klint Wagstaff	Across The Waves Bundaberg Eagles
*2017*	Josh Wheeler	Bay Power
2018	Scott Stiefler (TIED)	Gympie Cats
2018	Marcus Dyson (TIED)	Bay Power
2019	Marcus Dyson	Bay Power
2020	Damian McRae	Across The Waves Bundaberg Eagles
2021	Dylan Rowe	Hervey Bay Bombers
2022	Tristan Taylor	Brothers Bulldogs
2023	Klint Wagstaff	Across The Waves Bundaberg Eagles

NOTE: The Stedman Medal was awarded in both seasons of 2003 and 2017, as all AFL Wide Bay clubs were playing each other, plus other teams from South East Queensland, but not under the banner of the AFL Wide Bay for those two seasons.

== AFL Wide Bay Reserve Grade Mens Grand Finals ==
Year	Premiers	Score	Runners Up	Score
1987	North Bundaberg Kangaroos	21.10 (136)	Hervey Bay Bombers	8.6 (54)
1988	South Bundaberg Magpies	17.8 (110)	Hervey Bay Bombers	7.13 (55)
1989	Hervey Bay Bombers	18.15 (123)	North Bundaberg Kangaroos	10.8 (68)
1990	Hervey Bay Bombers	24.28 (172)	West Bundaberg Bulldogs	4.4 (28)
1991	Hervey Bay Bombers	7.13 (55)	South Bundaberg Magpies	4.7 (31)
1992	Fraser Coast Lions	10.8 (68)	Hervey Bay Bombers	8.12 (60)
1993	Fraser Coast Lions	8.8 (56)	Hervey Bay Bombers	3.4 (22)
1994	Fraser Coast Lions	8.8 (56)	Hervey Bay Bombers	5.8 (38)
1995	Hervey Bay Bombers	10.10 (70)	Fraser Coast Lions	8.10 (58)
1996	Hervey Bay Bombers	9.8 (62)	ATW - South Bundaberg	6.6 (42)
1997	Fraser Coast Magpies	9.13 (67)	Hervey Bay Bombers	10.6 (66)
1998	Hervey Bay Bombers	10.6 (66)	ATW Bundaberg Eagles	8.6 (54)
1999	ATW Bundaberg Eagles	10.14 (74)	Hervey Bay Bombers	3.8 (26)
2000	Maryborough Bears	8.11 (59)	Hervey Bay Bombers	7.11 (53)
2001	Hervey Bay Bombers	21.9 (135)	ATW Bundaberg Eagles	2.1 (13)
2002	NO RESERVES GRAND FINAL		Suspended after Round 8	
2003	NO RESERVES GRAND FINAL		Competition Suspended	
2004	NO RESERVES GRAND FINAL		Competition Suspended	
2005	Hervey Bay Bombers	9.6 (60)	Maryborough Bears	3.6 (24)
2006	Hervey Bay Bombers	8.3 (51)	ATW Bundaberg Eagles	3.6 (24)
2007	Hervey Bay Bombers	13.6 (78)	ATW Bundaberg Eagles	6.5 (41)
2008	Hervey Bay Bombers	Score N/A	ATW Bundaberg Eagles	by 1 point
2009	Brothers Bulldogs	6.13 (49)	Hervey Bay Bombers	5.1 (31)
2010	Brothers Bulldogs	14.1 (85)	Bay Power	11.10 (76)
2011	Hervey Bay Bombers	11.12 (78)	Brothers Bulldogs	5.7 (37)
2012	Brothers Bulldogs	7.8 (50)	Hervey Bay Bombers	7.4 (46)
2013	Brothers Bulldogs	7.4 (46)	Hervey Bay Bombers	5.6 (36)
2014	Hervey Bay Bombers	10.7 (67)	ATW Bundaberg Eagles	2.5 (17)
2015	Brothers Bulldogs	11.6 (72)	Hervey Bay Bombers	5.6 (36)
2016	Hervey Bay Bombers	12.8 (80)	ATW Bundaberg Eagles	3.3 (21)
2017	Maryborough Bears	17.16 (118)	ATW Bundaberg Eagles	14.6 (90)
2018	ATW Bundaberg Eagles	14.13 (97)	Brothers Bulldogs	0.4 (4)
2019	Hervey Bay Bombers	9.11 (65)	Bay Power	5.10 (40)
2020	Hervey Bay Bombers	7.8 (50)	ATW Bundaberg Eagles	6.5 (41)
2021	Hervey Bay Bombers	7.11 (53)	Bay Power	2.3 (15)
2022	Hervey Bay Bombers	13.6 (84)	Bay Power	0.1 (1)
2023	Hervey Bay Bombers	15.8 (98)	Brothers Bulldogs	2.1 (13)
2024	Maryborough Bears	6.3 (39)	Pomona Demons	3.4 (22)
2025	Maryborough Bears	6.4 (40)	Hervey Bay Bombers	4.7 (31)

=== AFL Wide Bay Reserves Mens Grand Final Summary List 1987-2025 ===
Club	Full Seasons	Grand Finals	Premiers	Runners up
Hervey Bay Bombers	35	32	19	13
Fraser Coast Lions/Magpies	7	5	4	1
Brothers Bulldogs (West Bundaberg)	35	9	5	4
Across The Waves Bundaberg Eagles	25	11	2	9
South Bundaberg (ATW Magpies)	10	3	1	2
North Bundaberg Kangaroos	9	2	1	1
Maryborough Bears (Formerly Tigers)	23	5	4	1
Bay Power	19	4	0	4
Pomona Demons	6	1	0	1
Burnett Heads Saints	1	0	0	0
Gympie Cats	10	0	0	0

Note: The Reserve Grade Seniors Season was suspended after Round 8 in 2002, and was not contested from 2003-2004.

== See also ==
- Australian rules football in South East Queensland
