= Mary Kathleen, Queensland =

Settlement in Queensland, Australia

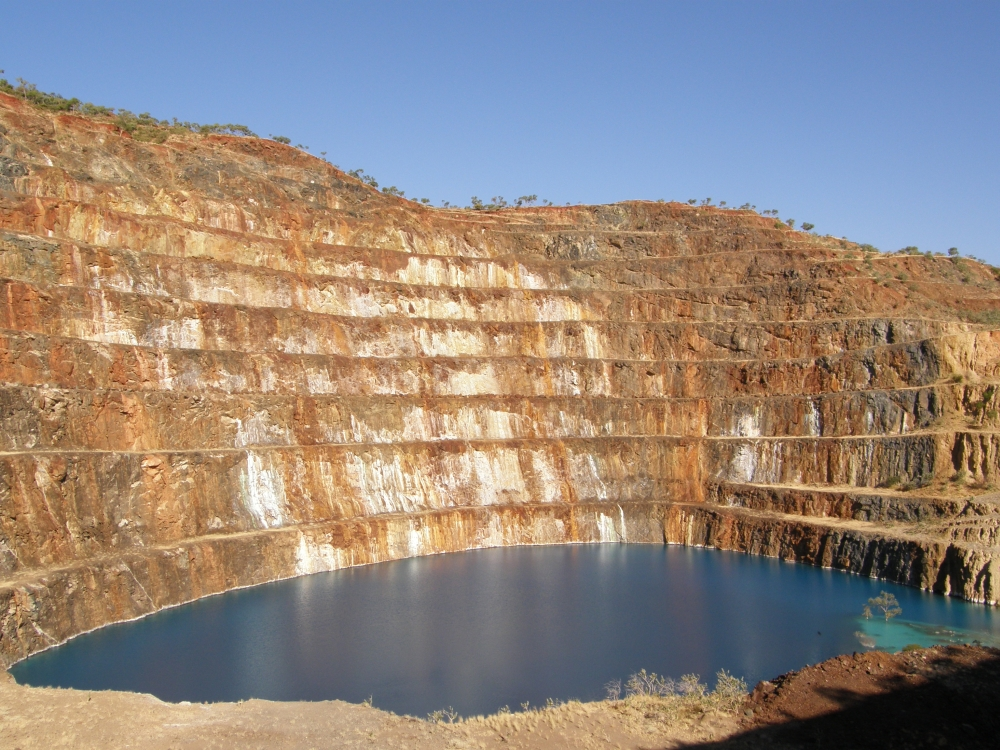
The abandoned open pit of Mary Kathleen mine, 2009

Mary Kathleen was a mining town in the locality of Cloncurry in the Shire of Cloncurry, North West, Queensland, Australia. It was located in the Selwyn Range between Mount Isa and Cloncurry.

== History ==
Mary Kathleen was first settled during the 1860s. Uranium was first discovered at Mary Kathleen by Clem Walton and Norm McConachy in 1954: the deposit and the township was named after the late wife of McConachy. Prospecting and exploitation rights were subsequently on-sold, and in 1955 Rio Tinto Mining formed Mary Kathleen Uranium Ltd to develop a mine and service town. An architect-designed town grew during 1956–58, with reticulated water from a dam, Lake Corella.

Mary Kathleen State School opened on 9 July 1956. It closed on 24 June 1983.

St Peter's Catholic Church was built in 1958. After the town closed, the church building was relocated to be a shelter shed at Saint Joseph’s Catholic School in Mount Isa.

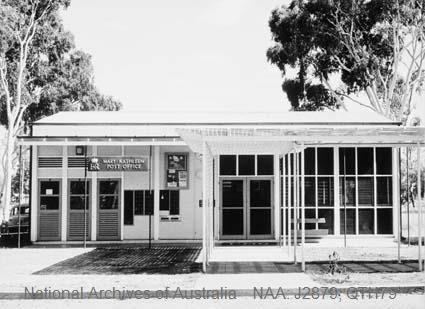
Mary Kathleen Post Office, 1959

The Mary Kathleen Post Office was opened on 10 September 1959.

== Uranium mine ==
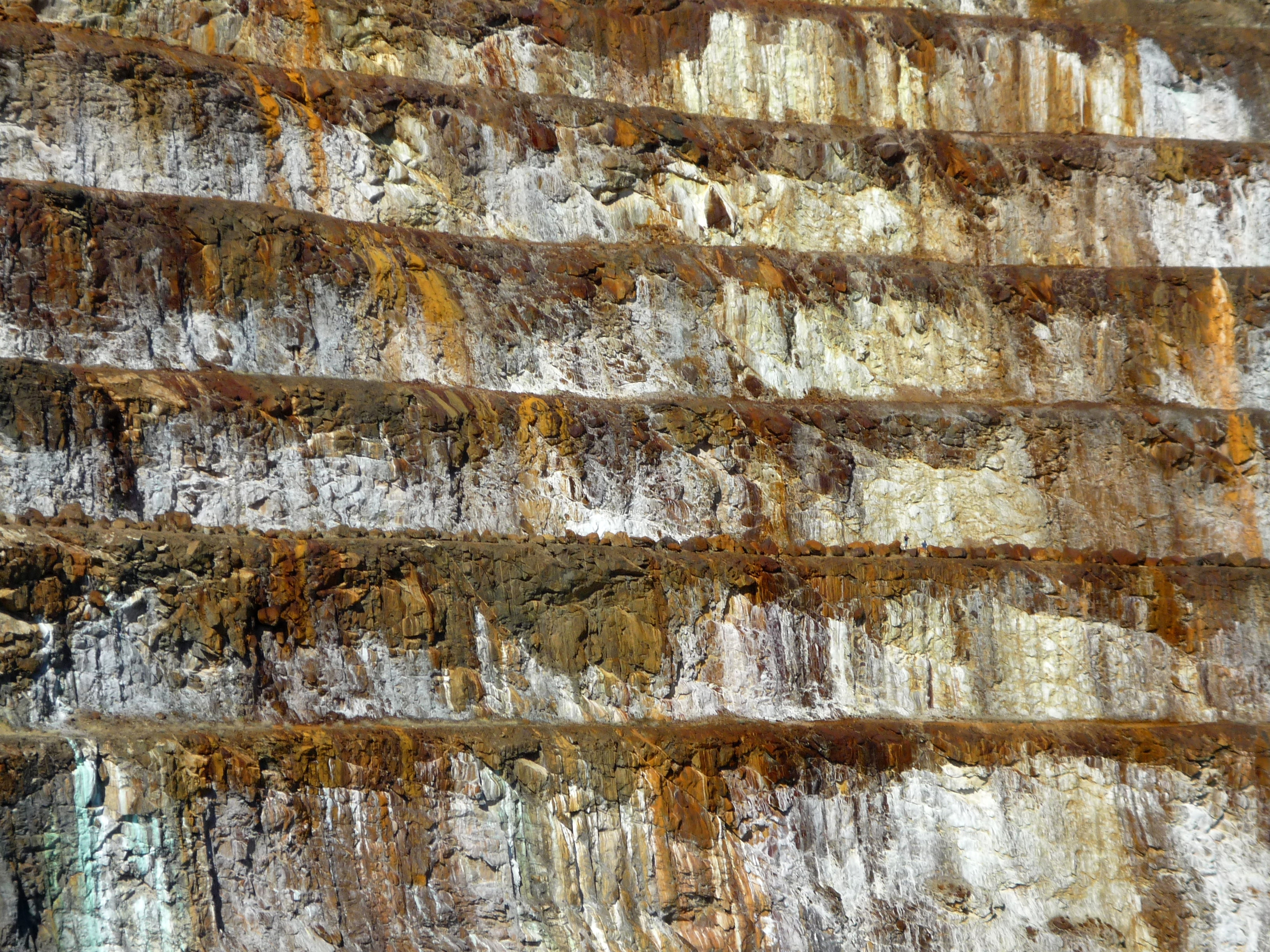
Mine terraces, 2011

In 1954, a significant uranium deposit was discovered at the site (20.7470°S, 140.0123°E). A sales contract with the United Kingdom Atomic Energy Authority was signed in 1956. Mining commenced at the end of 1956 and the treatment plant was commissioned in June 1958. The project was developed by Mary Kathleen Uranium Limited (MKU) at a cost of A $24 million. MKU was formed to develop the uranium deposits and work was soon commenced constructing the township, mine, and dam on the nearby Corella River. The ore was mined by the open-cut method and processed on site. In the first phase of operation from 1958 to 1963 Mary Kathleen treated 2.9 million tonnes of ore at an average grade of 0.13% to yield 4082 t (4500 short tons or 9 million pounds weight of U_{3}O_{8}) of uranium concentrate (then actually yellowcake - ammonium diuranate) containing 3460 tonnes of uranium. By 1963 the major supply contract had been satisfied ahead of schedule, and large reserves of ore lay at grass. Consequently, the works were closed down.

The mine then lay idle until 1974, when it was reopened. New supply contracts with Japanese, German and American power utilities prompted this re-opening, with Mary Kathleen's second life extended to 1982 when reserves were finally exhausted. The company made a share issue to raise capital, and the Commonwealth Government, through the Australian Atomic Energy Commission underwrote this, thereby obtaining a 42% holding in the company. Conzinc Riotinto of Australia Limited, a successor of Rio Tinto Mining, held 51%, and the public 7%. The second phase of production began in 1976 and the mine was finally closed down in 1982 after a further production of 4,802 tonnes of uranium oxide. A total of 31 million tonnes of ore were extracted from the mine until it was exhausted. Processing occurred on-site.

Mary Kathleen's uranium deposits originated from contact metasomatic processes. This type of occurrence is uncommon, with Mary Kathleen being the only commercial example. The uraninite here was conglomerated with garnet.

=== Town ===
The town, 6 kilometres (3.7 mi) away from the mine, was built around a shallow valley with a post office, cinema, sports ovals, a school, banks and a community store. The state school was opened in July 1956; temporary hospital facilities and a community store in March 1957; and May 1957 saw the first water pumped from Lake Corella Dam. By 1961, approximately 1000 people lived at the new township.

The Australian Broadcasting Corporation transmitted to Mary Kathleen via its relay station, ABMKQ, which was shut down when the town was abandoned in 1982.

Mary Kathleen was very much a planned, "model" township, blending with its surrounding environment. Two years later, however, with contracts fulfilled, the mine and township temporarily closed.

When the mine re-opened in mid-1974, the population at Mary Kathleen subsequently grew from 80 in August 1974 to 700 in August 1975 and peaked at approximately 1200 in 1981. During its "second life", existing private and community structures and services were revamped and augmented by new additions provided principally by Mary Kathleen Uranium Limited and the Cloncurry Shire Council.

=== Sport ===
The former town of Mary Kathleen has a unique feature in Australian sport history. The former Australian Rules club (Mary Kathleen) won three consecutive premierships from 1977 to 1979 in the Mount Isa Australian Football League, and is one of the few clubs or towns for that matter to win Senior titles, and no longer be in existence as a club or any population in its locality.

=== Closure ===
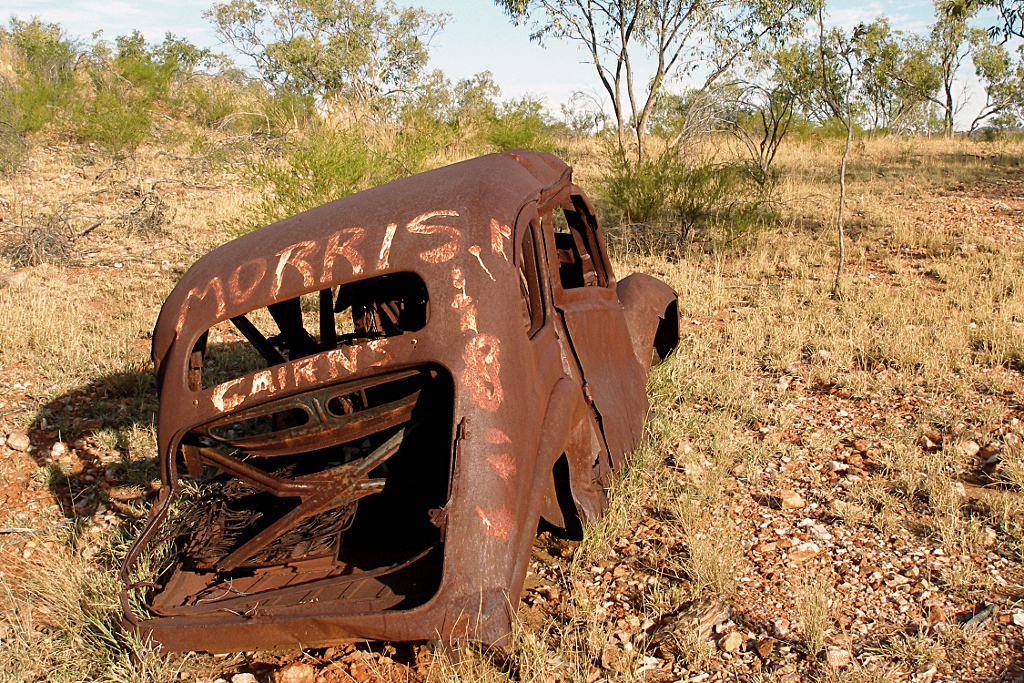
Rusted body of an abandoned Morris 8

With all contracts filled by late 1982, the township, mine and mill were dismantled and the tailings rehabilitated by the end of 1984. Mary Kathleen became the site of Australia's first major rehabilitation project of a uranium mine, which was completed at the end of 1985 at a cost of some A$19 million. In 1986, this work won an award from the Institution of Engineers Australia for environmental excellence. The site became well known for fossicking and gem-stone collecting, and numerous relics are held in the Cloncurry/Mary Kathleen Memorial Park and Museum in Cloncurry. The site, now only roads and concrete pads, can be accessed, as an overnight camp, from the Barkly Highway at -20.780837,139.9734. The land has since been rehabilitated and is now suitable for grazing.

=== Tailings seepage ===
Since rehabilitation, it has been found that the tailings repository at the Mary Kathleen site has been subject to seepage of radioactive waters from both the toe of the dam and the surface at rates much higher than initially predicted.

== See also ==
- List of ghost towns
- Uranium mining in Australia
