= AFL Mackay =

Amateur Australian rules football competition

- Most recent season or competition: 2025 AFL Queensland season
- Formerly: Mackay Australian Football League
- Sport: Australian rules football
- Founded: 1970
- Divisions: (3) Senior Men, Senior Women, Reserve Men
- No. of teams: 6
- Country: Australia
- Most recent champion: Senior Men: North Mackay Senior Women: Bakers Creek (2025)
- Most titles: Senior Men: North Mackay Saints (15) MJ Miller Medal: John Price (3: 2006, 2007, 2008), Desmond Hayes (3: 2010, 2015, 2016)
- Sponsor: Allied Pickford's
- Website: Official AFL Mackay Website

AFL Mackay is an amateur Australian rules football competition formed as the Mackay Australian Football League in 1970. It is headquartered in the city of Mackay with further clubs in Airlie Beach, Bakers Creek and Moranbah. The representative team is known as the Crows. The Premier division is now sponsored by Allied Pickfords Australia (renaming it to Allied Pickfords Cup)

== History ==
The first Australian rules football matches in Mackay were held in 1885, however most clubs in the region later adopted rugby rules. It would be almost a century before regular competition would again be played in the region.

The Mackay Australian Football League began in 1970 with founding clubs being the East Mackay Demons, West Mackay Magpies (later Walkerston), and North Mackay Colts.

- 1971 Bakers Creek join.
- 1975 Moranbah join.
- 1977 Mackay City join.
- 1980 Dysart join.
- 1982 Middlemount join. Dysart and Middlemount, along with Moranbah, move to the Central Highlands AFL as shift work made it difficult to consistently field teams
- 1983 Trend United break away from North Mackay
- 1985 Airlie Beach come into the competition. They change their name to Whitsunday in 1990.
- 1987 East Mackay and Trend United amalgamate to become known as Eastern Swans.
- 1989 Moranbah return but the same problems arise and in 1993 again returned to the Central Highlands.
- 1990 Mackay City change their name to Northern Beaches and then back to Mackay City in 1998.
- 2011 Andergrove Kangaroos joined the competition, changed their name to the Northern Beaches Magpies in 2012, and then to the Mackay Magpies in 2015.

== Clubs ==
All clubs field senior men's sides. Eastern Swans do not field a senior women's side, while Moranbah and Whitsunday do not field reserve men's sides.

=== Locations ===
Red = senior clubs

Yellow = junior-only clubs

Club locations - Mackay	Club locations - Greater Mackay

=== Senior ===
Club	Colours	Nickname	Home Ground	Former League	Est.	Years in MAFL	MAFL Senior Premierships	
Club	Colours	Nickname	Home Ground	Former League	Est.	Years in MAFL	Total	Years
Bakers Creek		Tigers	Etwell Park, Bakers Creek	–	1971	1971–	9	1971, 1972, 1979, 1981, 1989, 1990, 1991, 1992, 1999
Eastern Swans (East Mackay 1970-86)		Swans	Rogers Oval, South Mackay	–	1970	1970–	7	1970, 1973, 1980, 1988, 1998, 2009, 2015, 2024
Mackay (Andergrove 2011; Northern Beaches 2012-14)		Magpies	Magpies Sports Park, Glenella	–	2011	2011-	0	-
Mackay City (Northern Beaches 1990-97)		Hawks	Harrup Park, South Mackay	–	1977	1977-1978, 1980-	9	1985, 1986, 1997, 2000, 2011, 2012, 2013, 2016, 2026
Moranbah		Bulldogs	Stevenson Sports Park, Moranbah	CHAFL	1975	1975–1982, 1989–1991, 2006–	3	1977, 1978, 2014
North Mackay		Saints	Zeolla Park, Beaconsfield	–	1970	1970–	15	1974, 1976, 1983, 1987, 2001, 2002, 2003, 2007, 2008, 2019, 2020, 2021, 2022, 2023, 2025
Whitsunday (Airlie Beach 1985-89)		Sea Eagles	Whitsundays Sports Park, Jubilee Pocket	–	1985	1985-	10	1992, 1993, 1994, 1995, 2004, 2005, 2006, 2010, 2017, 2018

=== Juniors only ===
Club	Colours	Nickname	Home Ground	Est.	Years in MAFL
Sarina		Demons	Brewers Park, Sarina	2010	2010-

=== Former ===
Club	Colours	Nickname	Home Ground	Est.	Years in MAFL	MAFL Senior Premierships		Fate
Club	Colours	Nickname	Home Ground	Est.	Years in MAFL	Flags	Years	Fate
Alligator Creek		Bombers			?	Juniors only		Folded
Dysart		Swans	Leichhardt Recreation Reserve, Dysart	1980	1980-1982	0	-	Formed Central Highlands AFL in 1983
Pioneer Valley		Power	Etwell Park, Bakers Creek		?-2018	Juniors only		Merged with Bakers Creek in 2019
Middlemount		Kangaroos	Middlemount Sports Reserve, Middlemount	1982	1982	0	-	Formed Central Highlands AFL in 1983
Trend United		Swans		1983	1983–1986	1	1984	Split from North Mackay in 1983. Merged with East Mackay to form Eastern Swans in 1987
Walkerston (West Mackay 1970)		Magpies	Magpies Sports Park, Glenella	1970	1970–1986	1	1975	Folded after 1986 season

== MJ Miller Medal ==
The MJ Miller Medal is awarded to the best & fairest player as voted by the umpires in the senior men's competition. The award is named after Mick Miller; formerly of the Walkerston Magpies, who was a driving force behind the introduction of AFL to the Mackay Region.

Previous Winners:

- 1970 Dave Synnott (North Mackay)
- 1971 Mervyn Stevens (Bakers Creek)
- 1972 Michael Stirling (Walkerston)
- 1973 Anthony Davidson (East Mackay)
- 1974 Frank Zeolla (North Mackay)
- 1975 Ian McCleod (Moranbah), Colin Thompson (Bakers Creek)
- 1976 Gerrad Bench (Bakers Creek)
- 1977 Ness Berding (Moranbah)
- 1978 Ronald Perkins (Moranbah)
- 1979 Noel Jolliffe (Bakers Creek)
- 1980 Graham Allen (Mackay City)
- 1981 Peter Filler (Mackay City)
- 1982 Kevin Tschirpig (Bakers Creek)
- 1983 Gary Lewis (Bakers Creeek)
- 1984 Neville Allen (Mackay City)
- 1985 Peter Alexopolous (Bakers Creek)
- 1986 Gary Lewis (Bakers Creek)
- 1987 Warren Martin (Mackay City)
- 1988 Anthony Russell (Eastern Swans)
- 1989 Anthony Russell (Eastern Swans)
- 1990 Anthony Baker (Bakers Creek)
- 1991 Paul Harris (Eastern Swans), Andrew Prause (Bakers Creek)
- 1992 Jason McCormick (Bakers Creek)
- 1993 Claude Mafici (Northern Beaches)
- 1994 Wayne Aspland (Whitsunday), Peter Sharpe (Northern Beaches)
- 1995 Jeff Mackey (Whitsunday), Nigel McCarthy (Whitsunday), Ben Barber (Whitsunday)
- 1996 Jason Regan (Northern Beaches)
- 1997 Peter Morris (North Mackay Saints)
- 1998 Robert Wells (Northern Beaches Lions), Steven McMillian (Mackay City)

- 1999 Bruce Gillingham (Bakers Creek)
- 2000 Michael Purton (Bakers Creek)
- 2001 Robert Samovojska (Whitsunday)
- 2002 John Kupsch (Whitsunday)
- 2003 Brett Mills (Eastern Swans), Brett Chick (Mackay City)
- 2004 Ben Drew (Bakers Creek)
- 2005 Ben Hazell (Eastern Swans)
- 2006 John Price (North Mackay Saints)
- 2007 John Price (North Mackay Saints)
- 2008 John Price (North Mackay Saints)
- 2009 Paul Branchflower (Whitsunday)
- 2010 Desmond Hayes (Mackay City Hawks)
- 2011 Heath Thiele (Andergrove Kangaroos)
- 2012 Mark Savikauskas (Eastern Swans)
- 2013 Blake Miles (North Mackay Saints)
- 2014 Nathan Peters (North Mackay Saints)
- 2015 Desmond Hayes (Mackay City Hawks)
- 2016 Desmond Hayes (Mackay City Hawks)
- 2017 James Gallagher (North Mackay Saints)
- 2018 Cameron Hill (North Mackay Saints)
- 2019 Darcy Mealy (Eastern Swans)
- 2020 Braeden Ebert (Mackay Magpies)
- 2021 Alec Townsend (North Mackay Saints)
- 2022 David Manning (Eastern Swans)
- 2023 Steven Pugh (North Mackay Saints)
- 2023 Jacob Wilson (North Mackay Saints)
- 2024 Chris Endres (Eastern Swans)
- 2025 Jake Turner (Whitsunday)

== Premiers ==
- 1970 East Mackay
- 1971 Bakers Creek
- 1972 Bakers Creek
- 1973 East Mackay
- 1974 North Mackay
- 1975 Walkerston
- 1976 North Mackay
- 1977 Moranbah
- 1978 Moranbah
- 1979 Bakers Creek
- 1980 East Mackay
- 1981 Bakers Creek
- 1982 Mackay City
- 1983 North Mackay
- 1984 Trend United
- 1985 Mackay City
- 1986 Mackay City
- 1987 North Mackay
- 1988 Eastern Swans

- 1989 Bakers Creek
- 1990 Bakers Creek
- 1991 Bakers Creek
- 1992 Bakers Creek
- 1993 Whitsunday
- 1994 Whitsunday
- 1995 Whitsunday
- 1996 Whitsunday
- 1997 Northern Beaches
- 1998 Eastern Swans
- 1999 Bakers Creek
- 2000 Mackay City
- 2001 North Mackay
- 2002 North Mackay
- 2003 North Mackay
- 2004 Whitsunday
- 2005 Whitsunday
- 2006 Whitsunday
- 2007 North Mackay

- 2008 North Mackay
- 2009 Eastern Swans
- 2010 Whitsunday
- 2011 Mackay City
- 2012 Mackay City
- 2013 Mackay City
- 2014 Moranbah
- 2015 Eastern Swans
- 2016 Mackay City Hawks
- 2017 Whitsunday
- 2018 Whitsunday
- 2019 North Mackay
- 2020 North Mackay
- 2021 North Mackay
- 2022 North Mackay
- 2023 North Mackay
- 2024 Eastern Swans
- 2025 North Mackay

== Senior Mens Leading Goal Kickers ==
Year	Player	Club	Total goals
1970	David Synnott	North Mackay	31
1971	Mervyn Stevens	Bakers Creek	66
1972	Mervyn Stevens	Bakers Creek	54
1973	Mervyn Stevens	Bakers Creek	105
1974	Len Holland	North Mackay	65
1975	Mervyn Stevens	Bakers Creek	65
1976	Chris Mouat	Moranbah	57
1977	Chris Mouat	Moranbah	113
1978	Ronald Perkins	Moranbah	59
1979	Ness Berding	Moranbah	102
1980	Mervyn Stevens	Bakers Creek	91
1981	Kevin Kimber	Bakers Creek	79
1982	Mervyn Stevens	Mackay City	151
1983	Gary Chapman	Mackay City	76
1984	Peter Smith	Bakers Creek	59
1985	Allen Newman	Trend United	99
1986	Peter Smith	Bakers Creek	105
1987	Brian Park	Bakers Creek	49
1988	Peter Harris	Eastern Swans	100
1989	Anthony Baker	Bakers Creek	216
1990	Anthony Baker	Bakers Creek	136
1991	Peter Harris	North Mackay	228
1992	Geoffrey Reid	Eastern Swans	89
1993	Todd Watson	Whitsunday	103
1994	Damian Quirk	Whitsunday	64
1995	Paul Tascus	Whitsunday	81
1996	Ben Kingsley	Whitsunday	50
1997	Ty Miller	North Mackay	53
1998	Matt Cumming	Whitsunday	47
1999	Daniel Archer	Eastern Swans	100
2000	Barry Goodwin	Mackay City	57
2001	Greg Burdett	North Mackay	40
2002	Lenard Egan	North Mackay	54
2003	David Johnstone	Mackay City	80
2004	David Johnstone	Mackay City	63
2005	Sean Reilly	Mackay City	60
2006	Lenard Egan	North Mackay	80
2007	David Johnstone	Mackay City	80
2008	Craig Dowdell	North Mackay	108
2009	Grant Evans	Mackay City	74
2010	Joshua Murray	Bakers Creek	56
2011	Paul Cole	North Mackay	104
2012	Troy Weller	Whitsundays	76
2013	Michael Fisher	Moranbah Bulldogs	76
2014	Mathew Stephens	Mackay Hawks	97
2015	Brodie Saltmarsh	Mackay City Hawks	65
2016	Sean Reilly	Mackay City Hawks	
2017	Brendan Riddle	North Mackay Saints	71
2018	Sean Reilly	Mackay City Hawks	
2019	Samuel Dunbar	North Mackay Saints	70
2020	Benjamin Barba	Eastern Swans	26
2021	Benjamin Barba	Eastern Swans	63
2022	Cody Filewood	North Mackay Saints	64
2023	Cody Filewood	North Mackay Saints	50
2024	Joel Mitchell	Mackay Magpies	58
2025	Cameron Hill	North Mackay Saints	54

== 2008 Ladder ==
AFL Mackay	Wins	Byes	Losses	Draws	For	Against	%	Pts	Final	Team	G	B	Pts	Team	G	B	Pts
North Mackay	18	0	2	0	2938	879	334.24%	72	1st Semi	Eastern Swans	13	9	87	Mackay City	12	14	86
Whitsundays	15	0	5	0	2752	1303	211.20%	60	2nd Semi	North Mackay	16	16	112	Whitsundays	8	10	58
Mackay City	12	0	8	0	2050	1680	122.02%	48	Preliminary	Eastern Swans	18	6	114	Whitsundays	14	20	104
Eastern Swans	9	0	11	0	2109	2342	90.05%	36	Grand	North Mackay	25	17	167	Eastern Swans	8	11	59
Moranbah	4	0	16	0	1108	2468	44.89%	16									
Bakers Creek	2	0	18	0	942	3227	29.19%	8									

== 2009 Ladder ==
AFL Mackay	Wins	Byes	Losses	Draws	For	Against	%	Pts	Final	Team	G	B	Pts	Team	G	B	Pts
Whitsundays	18	0	0	0	2356	975	241.64%	72	1st Semi	Eastern Swans	21	6	132	Bakers Creek	5	7	37
Mackay City	11	0	7	0	2082	1234	168.72%	44	2nd Semi	Whitsundays	15	5	95	Mackay City	12	5	77
Eastern Swans	11	0	7	0	1558	1499	103.94%	44	Preliminary	Eastern Swans	17	10	112	Mackay City	11	12	78
Bakers Creek	7	0	11	0	1331	1800	73.94%	28	Grand	Eastern Swans	11	6	72	Whitsundays	9	9	63
North Mackay	6	0	12	0	1443	1686	85.59%	24									
Moranbah	1	0	17	0	788	2364	33.33%	4									

== 2010 Ladder ==
AFL Mackay	Wins	Byes	Losses	Draws	For	Against	%	Pts	Final	Team	G	B	Pts	Team	G	B	Pts
Whitsundays	15	0	3	0	1713	850	201.53%	60	1st Semi	North Mackay	7	10	52	Bakers Creek	6	6	42
Mackay City	14	0	4	0	1875	784	239.16%	56	2nd Semi	Mackay City	11	9	75	Whitsundays	8	13	61
North Mackay	10	0	8	0	1494	1127	132.56%	40	Preliminary	Whitsundays	17	18	120	North Mackay	6	4	40
Bakers Creek	8	0	10	0	1337	1187	112.64%	32	Grand	Whitsundays	16	12	108	Mackay City	7	6	48
Eastern Swans	6	0	12	0	1151	1547	74.40%	24									
Moranbah	1	0	17	0	511	2586	19.80%	4									

== 2011 Ladder ==
AFL Mackay	Wins	Byes	Losses	Draws	For	Against	%	Pts	Final	Team	G	B	Pts	Team	G	B	Pts
Mackay City	16	0	0	0	1958	434	451.15%	64	1st Semi	Andergrove	10	7	67	Whitsundays	6	4	40
North Mackay	12	0	3	1	1800	706	254.96%	50	2nd Semi	Mackay City	6	6	42	North Mackay	5	9	39
Andergrove	9	0	7	0	1084	1169	92.73%	36	Preliminary	North Mackay	15	7	97	Andergrove	4	6	30
Whitsundays	8	0	7	1	793	1122	70.68%	34	Grand	Mackay City	9	13	67	North Mackay	3	9	27
Eastern Swans	7	0	9	0	867	1185	73.16%	28									
Moranbah	3	0	13	0	468	1624	28.82%	12									
Bakers Creek	0	0	16	0	304	1034	29.40%	0									

== 2012 Ladder ==
AFL Mackay	Wins	Byes	Losses	Draws	For	Against	%	Pts	Final	Team	G	B	Pts	Team	G	B	Pts
Mackay City	11	3	2	1	1499	520	288.27%	58	1st Semi	Eastern Swans	17	7	109	North Mackay	8	5	53
Whitsundays	11	3	3	0	1513	659	229.59%	56	2nd Semi	Whitsundays	13	10	88	Mackay City	9	15	69
North Mackay	9	3	5	0	1187	873	135.97%	48	Preliminary	Mackay City	10	14	74	Eastern Swans	8	5	53
Eastern Swans	8	3	6	0	1162	853	136.23%	44	Grand	Mackay City	12	9	81	Whitsundays	9	6	60
Magpies Northern Beaches	6	3	7	1	1030	864	119.21%	38									
Moranbah	3	3	11	0	700	1430	48.95%	24									
Bakers Creek	0	3	14	0	392	2284	17.16%	12									

== 2013 Ladder ==
AFL Mackay	Wins	Byes	Losses	Draws	For	Against	%	Pts	Final	Team	G	B	Pts	Team	G	B	Pts
Mackay City	14	3	2	0	2219	631	351.66%	68	1st Semi	Moranbah	14	15	99	North Mackay	15	4	94
Eastern Swans	13	3	3	0	1825	826	220.94%	64	2nd Semi	Mackay City	10	11	71	Eastern Swans	6	13	49
Moranbah	11	3	5	0	1887	940	200.74%	56	Preliminary	Eastern Swans	7	9	51	Moranbah	5	13	43
North Mackay	8	3	8	0	1457	970	150.21%	44	Grand	Mackay City	19	14	128	Eastern Swans	7	9	51
Whitsundays	7	3	9	0	1118	1446	77.32%	40									
Magpies Northern Beaches	3	3	13	0	836	2165	38.60%	24									
Bakers Creek	0	3	16	0	507	2871	17.70%	12									

== 2014 Ladder ==
AFL Mackay	Wins	Byes	Losses	Draws	For	Against	%	Pts	Final	Team	G	B	Pts	Team	G	B	Pts
Mackay City	12	3	2	0	1748	644	271.43%	60	1st Semi	Eastern Swans	11	14	80	North Mackay	7	6	48
Moranbah	11	3	3	0	1620	794	204.03%	56	2nd Semi	Moranbah	17	6	108	Mackay City	8	13	61
North Mackay	11	3	3	0	1382	746	185.25%	56	Preliminary	Mackay City	12	9	81	Eastern Swans	10	8	68
Eastern Swans	8	3	6	0	1378	992	138.91%	44	Grand	Moranbah	12	8	80	Mackay City	9	11	65
Whitsundays	4	3	10	0	903	1371	65.86%	28									
Bakers Creek	3	3	11	0	583	1721	33.88%	24									
Magpies Northern Beaches	0	3	14	0	506	1852	27.32%	12									

== See also ==
- Australian Rules football in Queensland

== League ==
- Official AFL Mackay Website
