= Soldiers Hill, Queensland =

Soldiers Hill
- Suburb
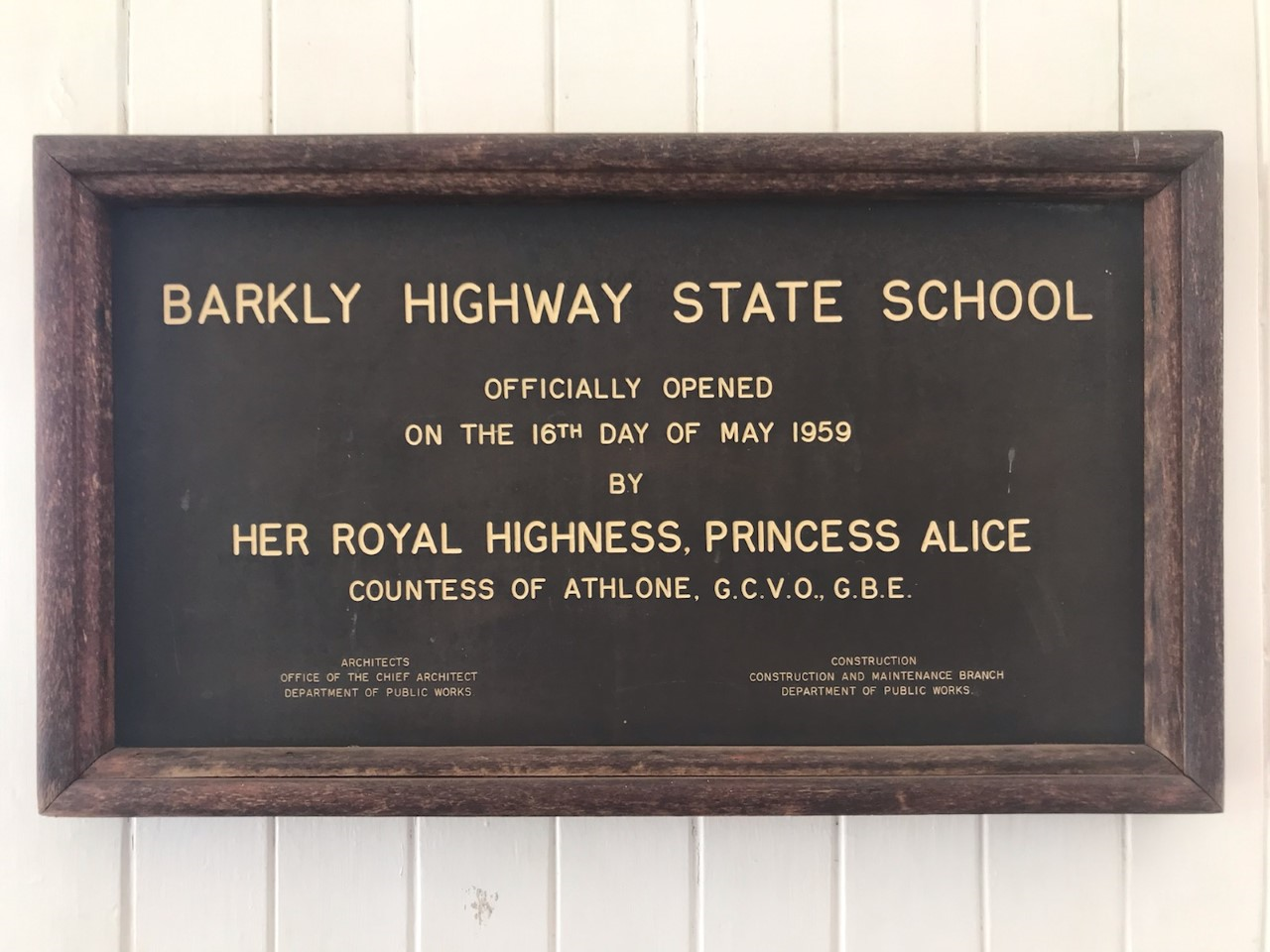
- Plaque commemorating the official opening of Barkly Highway State School by Princess Alice, Countess of Athlone, on 16 May 1959

- Interactive map of Soldiers Hill
- Coordinates: 20.7054°S 139.4898°E
- Country: Australia
- State: Queensland
- LGA: City of Mount Isa
- Location: 3.8 km (2.4 mi) N of Mount Isa CBD; 908 km (564 mi) W of Townsville; 1,829 km (1,136 mi) NW of Brisbane

Government
  - State electorate: Traeger
  - Federal division: Kennedy

Area
  - Total: 1.7 km^{2} (0.66 sq mi)

Population
  - Total: 1,796 (2021 census)
  - Density: 1,056/km^{2} (2,740/sq mi)
- Time zone: UTC+10:00 (AEST)
- Postcode: 4825
Suburbs around Soldiers Hill
Mount Isa (locality)	Kalkadoon	Lanskey
Mount Isa (locality)	Soldiers Hill	Ryan; Winston
Mount Isa (locality)	Miles End	Menzies

Soldiers Hill is a suburb of the town of Mount Isa in the City of Mount Isa, Queensland, Australia. In the 2021 census, Soldiers Hill had a population of 1,796 people.

== Geography ==
The Leichhardt River flows north-south through the town of Mount Isa, dividing the suburbs of the town into "mineside" (west of the Leichhardt River) and "townside" (east of the Leichhardt River). Soldiers Creek is a "mineside" suburb.

The suburb is bounded to the west by the Barkly Highway and to the east by the Leichhard River.

== History ==
In 1954, St James' Anglican Church in Parkside (which was originally St James's Anglican Church in Selwyn) was relocated to Soldiers Hill and renamed St Oswald's Anglican Church. St Oswald's operated for several years, before being sold for removal.

Barkly Highway State School opened on 27 January 1959. It was officially opened on Saturday 16 May 1959, by Princess Alice, Countess of Athlone.

Soldiers Hill was officially named on 1 September 1973 by the Queensland Place Names Board. On 16 March 2001, its status was changed from locality to suburb.

== Demographics ==
In the 2016 census, Soldiers Hill had a population of 1,962 people.

In the 2021 census, Soldiers Hill had a population of 1,796 people.

== Education ==
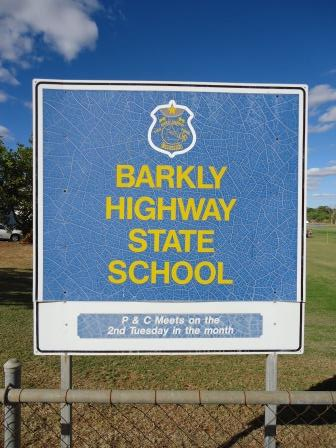
Barkly Highway State School sign, 2012

Barkly Highway State School is a government primary (Early Childhood-6) school for boys and girls at 17 Bougainville Street (20.7076°S 139.4893°E). It includes a special education program. In 2017, the school had an enrolment of 410 students with 31 teachers and 17 non-teaching staff (12 full-time equivalent).

The nearest government secondary school is Spinifex State College which has its junior campus in Parkside to the south and its senior campus in Pioneer to the south-east.

== Amenities ==
There are a number of parks in the area:

- Gallipoli Park (20.7038°S 139.4882°E)
- Leichhardt Park (20.7111°S 139.4867°E)
- Quota Park (20.6972°S 139.4919°E)
- Urquhart Street Park (20.7025°S 139.4923°E)
- Wellington Oval (20.7139°S 139.4908°E)
