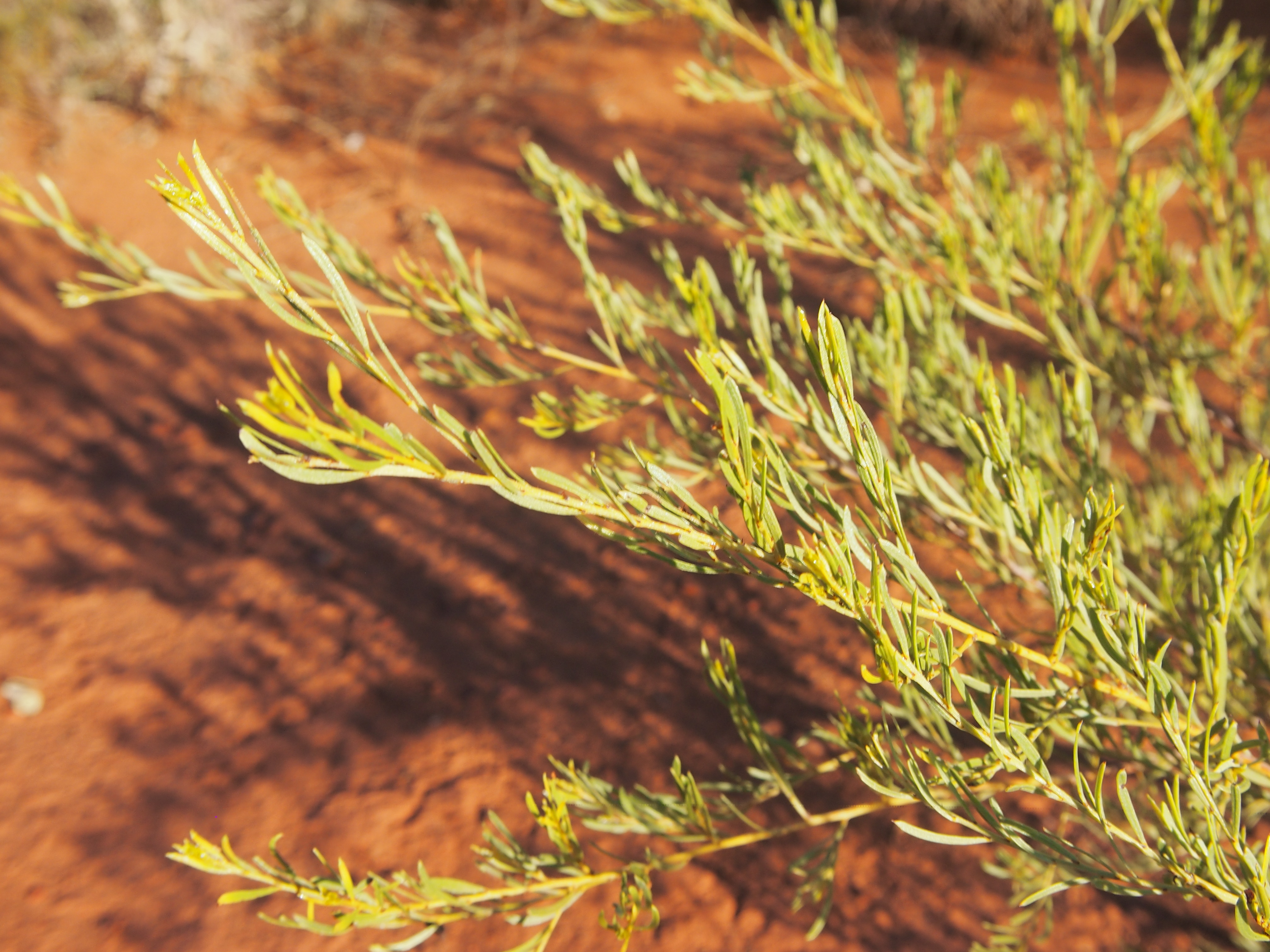

Scientific classification
- Kingdom: Plantae
- Clade: Tracheophytes
- Clade: Angiosperms
- Clade: Eudicots
- Clade: Rosids
- Order: Fabales
- Family: Fabaceae
- Subfamily: Caesalpinioideae
- Clade: Mimosoid clade
- Genus: Acacia
- Species: A. citriodora

Binomial name
- Acacia citriodora Kodela & Maslin

= Acacia citriodora =

Lemon-scented wattle

Species of legume

Acacia citriodora, commonly known as lemon-scented wattle, is a species of flowering plant in the family Fabaceae and is endemic to northern Australia. It is a spreading, sticky, glabrous, multi-stemmed, lemon-scented shrub with fissured greyish brown bark, oblong to linear phyllodes, spikes of golden yellow flowers, and erect, linear pods.

== Description ==
Acacia citriodora is a spreading, sticky, lemon-scented, glabrous, flat-topped shrub with many stems that typically grows to a height of 0.5–2 m (1 ft 8 in – 6 ft 7 in) and has fissured, greyish brown bark. Its branchlets are terete and obscurely ribbed. The phyllodes are narrowly oblong to linear, sometimes in pairs in axils, mostly 20–40 mm (0.79–1.57 in) long and 2–4 mm (0.079–0.157 in) wide, the tip coarsely to sharply pointed, sometimes with a gland near the base of the phyllodes. The flowers are golden yellow and borne in spikes 9–25 mm (0.35–0.98 in) long on a peduncle 15–30 mm (0.59–1.18 in) long. Flowering has been recorded between May and October, and the pods are erected, linear and tapered but flat-sided, 25–50 mm (0.98–1.97 in) long, 3–5 mm (0.12–0.20 in) wide and thick and pale-coloured. The seeds are oblong, brown or olive brown, 3.2–5 mm (0.13–0.20 in) long.

== Taxonomy ==
Acacia citriodora was first formally described in 2016 by Phillip Kodela and Bruce Maslin in the journal Nuytsia from specimens collected near the Mount Isa - Camooweal road by Clifford Halliday Gittins in 1967. The specific epithet (citriodora) refers to the lemon-scented foliage of this species.

== Distribution and habitat ==
This species of wattle grows in gravelly red or brown soils on ridges or plains in spinifex shrubland or savannah eucalypt woodland in arid northern Australia, mainly in the Kimberley region of Western Australia, the far north-west of Queensland, near the western and eastern Northern Territory borders, and in the Mount Isa and Camooweal areas.

== Conservation status ==
Acacia citriodora is listed as "not threatened" by the Government of Western Australia Department of Biodiversity, Conservation and Attractions, of "least concern" by the Queensland Government Nature Conservation Act 1992, but as "data deficient" under the Northern Territory Government Territory Parks and Wildlife Conservation Act.

== See also ==
- List of Acacia species
