= Tree of Knowledge =

Tree of Knowledge may refer to:

== Religion and mythology ==
- Tree of the knowledge of good and evil, a tree in the Garden of Eden, mentioned in the Book of Genesis
- Yggdrasil, the Norse world tree, on which Odin hung upside down in exchange for knowledge

== Places ==
- Tree of Knowledge (Australia), a tree in Oak Street, Barcaldine, Barcaldine Region, Queensland, Australia
- Tree of Knowledge, Camooweal, a tree on the Barkly Highway, Camooweal, City of Mount Isa, Queensland, Australia
- Kidman's Tree of Knowledge, a tree at Glengyle Station, Bedourie, Shire of Diamantina, Queensland, Australia

== Arts and entertainment ==
=== Art ===
- The Tree of Knowledge (mural), a 1962 mural by Alan Boyson
- Tree of Knowledge (sculpture), a 1981 sculpture by Lubo Kristek

=== Film ===
- The Tree of Knowledge (1920 film), a 1920 American film directed by William C. deMille
- Tree of Knowledge (film), a 1981 Danish film directed by Nils Malmros

=== Literature ===
- The Tree of Knowledge (novel), a 1911 novel by Pío Baroja
- Drvo znanja, a Croatian magazine
- Tree of Knowledge, a 1994 encyclopedia published by Marshall Cavendish
- The Tree of Knowledge: The Biological Roots of Human Understanding, a 1987 book by Humberto Maturana and Francisco Varela

== Other uses ==
- Tree of knowledge (philosophy), a metaphor presented by René Descartes
- Tree of knowledge system, a map of history from the Big Bang to the present

== See also ==
- Tree of Science (disambiguation)
