= Hodgkinson's Marked Tree =

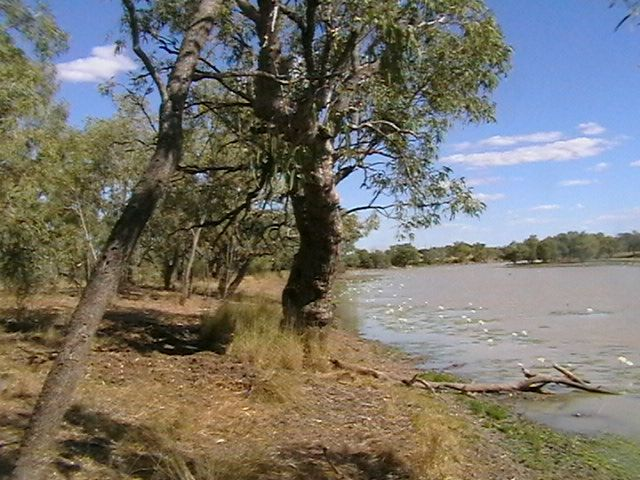
- Hodgkinson's Marked Tree, 2007

- Location within Queensland Location within Australia
- 19.854°S 138.1062°E
- Location: Rocklands Station, Camooweal, City of Mount Isa, Queensland, Australia

Queensland Heritage Register
- Official name: Hodgkinson's Marked Tree
- Type: state heritage (landscape)
- Designated: 21 October 1992
- Reference no.: 600741
- Significant period: 1876 (historical)

Hodgkinson's Marked Tree is a heritage-listed tree at Rocklands Station, Camooweal, City of Mount Isa, Queensland, Australia. It was added to the Queensland Heritage Register on 21 October 1992.

== History ==
Hodgkinson's Marked Tree on the northeastern shore of Lake Mary, Rocklands Station, near Camooweal, was marked during William Oswald Hodgkinson's North-West Expedition of 1876 to identify new grazing land in far western Queensland. This was the last government-sponsored exploratory expedition in Queensland, taking Hodgkinson to the Diamantina, Mulligan and Herbert rivers, then north to Normanton via the Gregory, Cloncurry and Flinders Rivers.

Explorer William Landsborough was the first European to pass through the Camooweal area. At the time (1861–62) he was looking for Burke and Wills. His reports led to the area being settled by pastoralists who established sheep runs in the district a few years after his expedition. The first settler to the area was John Sutherland, who with John Frazer and William Hanson of Sydney successfully applied for the Rocklands lease in 1865. Loss of stock to dingos combined with isolation, scarcity of labour and transport difficulties forced him to abandon his lease.

In September 1875 the lease was auctioned and Benjamin Crosthwaite purchased Rocklands. In September 1876 William Oswald Hodgkinson during his north west exploration camped beside Lake Mary on Crosthwaite's property, near the station homestead on the eastern side of the lake, just north of the later town of Camooweal.

William Oswald Hodgkinson first visited Australia in 1851 as a midshipman. By 1853 he was working for the Victorian Colonial Government until returning to England c. 1854. In 1859 he returned to Australia to join the literary staff of The Age newspaper. He started with the ill-fated Burke and Wills expedition in 1860 and the following year joined in John McKinlay's search for them. He founded newspapers in Rockhampton and Mackay before moving to the Ravenswood gold fields in 1868. In 1870 he was appointed mining warden and police magistrate on the Etheridge goldfield and in 1876 James Venture Mulligan named the Hodgkinson goldfield after him. Hodgkinson was Member of the Legislative Assembly for Burke in 1874–75, resigning to lead the North West Expedition. From 1878 to 1886 he served as mining warden on the Etheridge, the Palmer and at Gympie. He was a member of the Queensland Parliament on several occasions, serving as Minister of Mines and Works from 12 December 1887 to 13 June 1888 and Minister of Mines and Public Instruction from 12 August 1890 to 27 March 1893.

By correspondence dated 29 September 1875, Hodgkinson was instructed by the Queensland Government to seek out pastoral country known to exist on the Diamantina River and areas to its west towards the border with South Australia's northern territory (now the Northern Territory). In 1877, Hodgkinson's report of his explorations from 13 April to 27 September 1876 was published in the Votes and Proceedings of the Queensland Parliament.

On 17 September 1876 Hodgkinson traversed country below the junction of Rankin's Creek with the Herbert River, which had been occupied before but abandoned due to the pastoral crisis of 1866 and the scarcity of labour and transport. By 26 September Hodgkinson had travelled up the Herbert River to Lake Mary, where he found Landsborough's Camp 22 marked tree of "XMAS 1861".

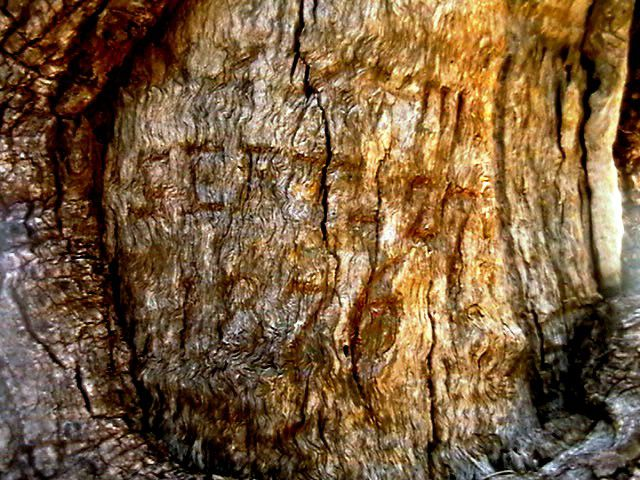
Marks on the tree

Like Landsborough, Hodgkinson also camped on the shores of Lake Mary. He too marked a tree to show that his North-West Expedition had been there, reporting that he used a "broad arrow over H over LXXXVIII over 27-10 over 1876". On the map attached to his report he noted this camp as marked by a broad arrow over LXXXVIII over Sep 27 over 1876, and the entry date in his report is 27 September, not October. This was the last tree that Hodgkinson reported as marking during the 1876 expedition, but the map accompanying his report indicates further camp sites as the expedition continued north east along the Gregory River. Whether trees were marked at these other camps is not indicated on the 1876 map, but a 1920 survey plan showing pastoral holdings in this area indicates that Hodgkinson had marked a tree at camp 90 (broad arrow over H over XC over O), near where he crossed the O'Shanassy River. It is likely a tree was marked at each camp site as this was the usual practice of exploratory parties, so that others might follow.

Hodgkinson's Marked Tree at Rocklands Station was entered in the National Trust of Queensland's Register of Significant Trees in 1983. At that time a photograph attached to the nomination showed that the original markings were still visible. The place was entered in the Queensland Heritage Register in August 1992 under the transitional provisions of the Queensland Heritage Act 1992.

On Christmas Day 2003 a family group travelled by boat up the Georgina River from Camooweal to Lake Mary to check on the Hodgkinson Tree and found it was healthy and still leaning over the lake.

== Description ==
The Hodgkinson Tree is a mature Coolibah tree (Eucalyptus microtheca) on the northeastern bank of Lake Mary, in the Rocklands Station homestead paddock north of Camooweal. It leans over the lake, which is part of the Georgina River system.

The National Trust of Queensland holds a photocopy of a c. 1983 photograph of the tree, showing carved into a branch, above a fork in the trunk, a broad arrow over H over LXXXVIII over Sep 27 over 1876.

These markings are believed to be still visible.

== Heritage listing ==
Hodgkinson's Marked Tree was listed on the Queensland Heritage Register on 21 October 1992 having satisfied the following criteria.

The place is important in demonstrating the evolution or pattern of Queensland's history.

This Coolibah tree was marked on 27 September 1876 to record camp 88 of William Oswald Hodgkinson's government-sponsored North-West Expedition in search of unexplored pastoral country in far western Queensland. The tree marked the end of Hodgkinson's main exploratory work during this expedition, the country further north being reasonably well known by this date. Due to Hodgkinson's efforts valuable pastoral lands were opened, leading to the viable development of far western Queensland. Hodgkinson's Marked Tree is symbolic of the nature and pattern of exploration of the Australian interior in the mid 19th century and is important surviving evidence of this principal theme in Queensland's history.

The place has a special association with the life or work of a particular person, group or organisation of importance in Queensland's history.

This marked tree has a special association with the work of William Oswald Hodgkinson, an explorer, journalist, goldfields warden/police magistrate and politician who in many and varied activities made a significant contribution to the development of Queensland from the 1860s to the 1890s.
