= Camooweal Caves National Park =

National park in Australia

- IUCN category II (national park)
- Camooweal Caves National Park

- Location within Queensland
- Location: Queensland
- Coordinates: 20°3′0″S 138°11′4″E
- Area: 138 km^{2} (53 sq mi)
- Established: 1988
- Website: http://www.nprsr.qld.gov.au/parks/camooweal-caves/index.html

Camooweal Caves is a national park in Queensland, Australia, 15 km southeast of Camooweal and 1720 km northwest of Brisbane.

The traditional name of this place is Wiliyan-ngurru National Park. The average elevation of the terrain is 242 metres.

== Description ==
The national park consists of 13,800 hectares of eucalypt woodland, spinifex, wattle and Mitchell grass. Accessible to the public are two sinkholes that formed over 500 million years by water seepage through beds of dolomite. A picnic table is provided at Nowranie waterhole. Various bird species can be found here, including waterbirds and woodland species.

== History ==
The wider Camooweal area was inhabited by the Indjalandji-Dhidhanu People for thousands of years before the arrival of the Europeans in 1860s. The aboriginal people utilised the park area and the Georgina River for trade with their tribal neighbours. Till date, the Indjalandji-Dhidhanu People believe that the route is traversed by Dreamings, the routes covered by ancestral spirits who shaped the landscape. The Dreamings have created various sites of significance to the Indjalandji-Dhidhanu People in the park.

== See also ==
- Protected areas of Queensland
