= Freckleton's Stores, Camooweal =

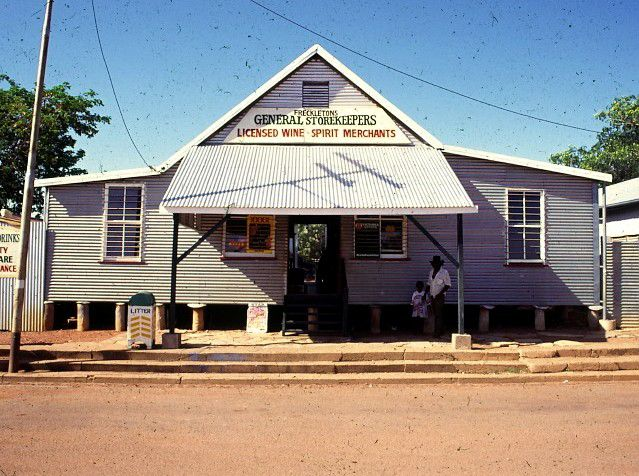
- Freckleton's Stores

- Location within Queensland Location within Australia
- 19.9212°S 138.1183°E
- Location: Barkly Street, Camooweal, City of Mount Isa, Queensland, Australia

History
- Design period: 1870s–1890s (late 19th century)
- Built: c. 1895–1950s

Queensland Heritage Register
- Official name: Freckleton's Stores, Synnot and Co., Synnot, Murray and Scholes
- Type: state heritage (built)
- Designated: 21 October 1992
- Reference no.: 600739
- Significant period: 1890s, 1900s, 1950s (fabric) c. 1895–ongoing (historical use)
- Significant components: footpath, furniture/fittings, steps/stairway, kerbing and channelling, wall/s – retaining

Freckleton's Stores is a heritage-listed group of shops at Barkly Street, Camooweal, City of Mount Isa, Queensland, Australia. It was built from c. 1895 to 1950s. It is also known as Synnot and Co., Synnot, Murray and Scholes and Synnot, Murray and Scholes. It was added to the Queensland Heritage Register on 21 October 1992.

== History ==
Freckleton's stores comprise a group of buildings located at the western end of Barkly Street, Camooweal, in north-west Queensland. The township of Camooweal was proclaimed in 1884, and developed as a pastoral centre for outback stations. Camooweal was also important in the context of pre-Federation customs collection, as it was only seven miles from the border with South Australia, later the Northern Territory.

The land was granted to Thomas Harding in 1888 and acquired by Frank Frith, a Camooweal storekeeper in 1891. The land was acquired by John Affleck in 1893. Affleck took out a mortgage with Patrick Synnott in 1895, suggesting that the earliest of the present stores which was built as a general store for bulk groceries such as flour, sugar and tea, was erected at about this time. At the turn of the century a two-gallon licence to decant and sell spirits was obtained, and c. 1901 a bond store was erected adjacent to the eastern side of the general store, which became known as the "gallon licence".

Although Normanton became the chief port into the Gulf of Carpentaria after the 1870s, it was from Burketown that the Camooweal district drew its supplies. Affleck and Synnott were Burketown merchants, of the firm Affleck, Synnott and Co.

Synnott and Co, storekeepers, were first recorded at Camooweal in 1903. Affleck took out a further mortgage with Burns Philp and Co in 1906. The stores were acquired by Patrick Synnott in 1911, and became known as Synnott, Murray and Scholes in 1918. They were managed by Synnott's son, James H Synnott, of Camooweal from 1934 to 1940.

In 1943 the business, including associated buildings, was sold to Joseph Freckleton a tank sinker and teamster originally from South Australia. By the 1940s the business had acquired the Shell and Qantas agencies and Freckleton was able to take advantage of wartime demand for aviation gasoline and other services during Camooweal's period as a military movements and supply centre.

By the late 1940s, in addition to the general store and gallon licence, the Freckleton family owned a number of buildings, including another store, in Camooweal. Around 1950 this store was moved onto the stores allotment and re-erected adjacent to the eastern side of the gallon licence, becoming the third building on the allotment. This former store was operated as a cafe and milkbar until the early 1980s.

Concrete footpaths and street gutters were laid by Freckleton during the early 1950s. Concrete retaining walls were erected around the early flagstone footpath outside the general store at this time. During the early 1950s Freckleton was involved in the purchase, dismantling and re-sale of ex army building materials and erected timber storage racks between the general store and gallon licence. Also during this period he erected a large iron shed at the rear of the allotment for bulk storage of liquor produce and fuel.

Freckleton died in 1964 and control of the stores passed to two of his children, Joseph Freckleton and Lillian Ada Miller. Substantial repairs and maintenance were undertaken on buildings on the allotment during the early 1970s. A kitchen and toilet were built onto the rear of the cafe for the manager, and a carport was erected at the rear of the allotment.

In 2009, following the death of Joe Freckleton, his sister Ada closed the store and the Barkly History Museum within it as, aged 82, she was unable to continue to operate it.

== Description ==
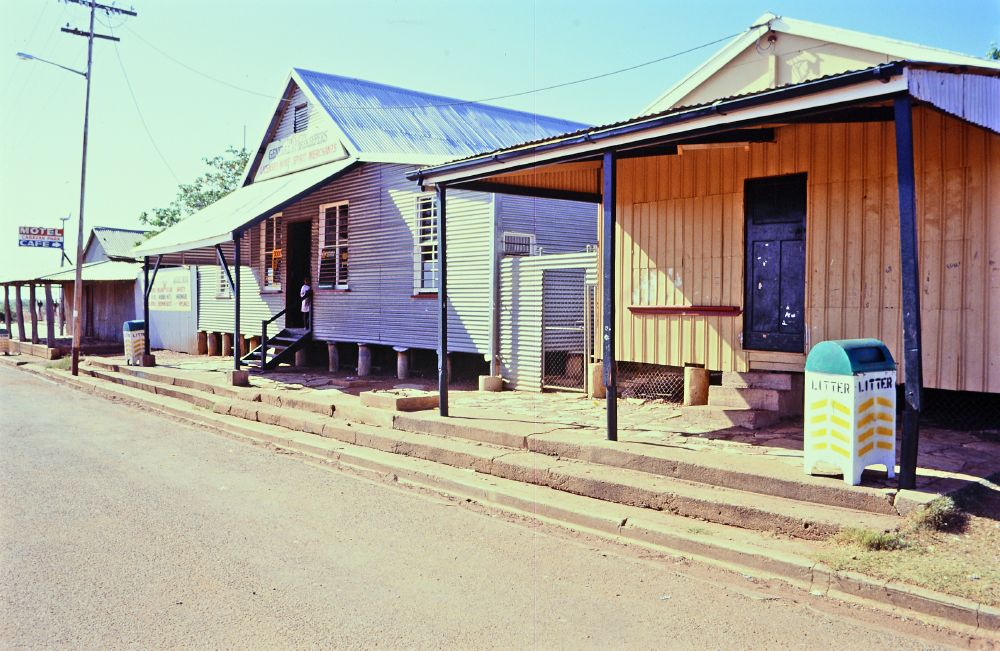
Freckleton's Stores, 1992

Freckletons Stores are situated on an allotment containing several single-storeyed timber and corrugated iron buildings, which include the Old Store (c. 1895) and the Bond Store/Gallon Licence (c. 1901). An iron covered timber storage rack and carport are also on the allotment.

The Old Store is clad in vertically-running corrugated iron on a timber frame and has a simple gabled roof flanked by skillions. The roof is supported by a simple structure of timber rafters, purlins and collar ties resting on round timber posts with brackets. The posts are founded on bedlogs, and the floor joists rest on the ground; this contact with the earth has created a white ant problem. The store contains extensive hand-hewn shelving for the storage of flour etc. Externally, an awning runs the width of the street elevation to the south. It is supported by five substantial round timber posts. It covers a section of footpath which is paved in local unworked limestone slabs set in a bedding of antbed, now concrete pointed, and is retained with a low concrete retaining wall. The building has a double door entrance at front and rear.

The Bond Store/Gallon Licence is clad in horizontally-running corrugated iron, and also has a simple gabled roof flanked by skillions. The building sits above the street on round timber stumps and steel posts. The store is lined internally with stained timber, and has extensive built-in timber shelving, cupboards and counters. An awning running the width of the gable end is supported on steel posts.

The two buildings complement each other in form and materials, and contribute to the streetscape as a now uncommon pair of corrugated iron stores.

== Heritage listing ==
Freckleton's Stores was listed on the Queensland Heritage Register on 21 October 1992 having satisfied the following criteria.

The place is important in demonstrating the evolution or pattern of Queensland's history.

Freckleton's Stores, Camooweal, are important in demonstrating the pattern of Queensland's history, in particular the pattern of inland development in north-west Queensland, and the role of Burketown as a supply centre for north-west Queensland.

The place is important in demonstrating the principal characteristics of a particular class of cultural places.

They are important in demonstrating the principal characteristics of early corrugated iron outback store buildings.

The place is important because of its aesthetic significance.

They exhibit particular aesthetic characteristics valued by the community, in particular their contribution to the character and streetscape of Camooweal.

The place has a strong or special association with a particular community or cultural group for social, cultural or spiritual reasons.

As longstanding stores in Camooweal and north-west Queensland, they have a special association with the Camooweal community.
