= Community Hall, Camooweal =

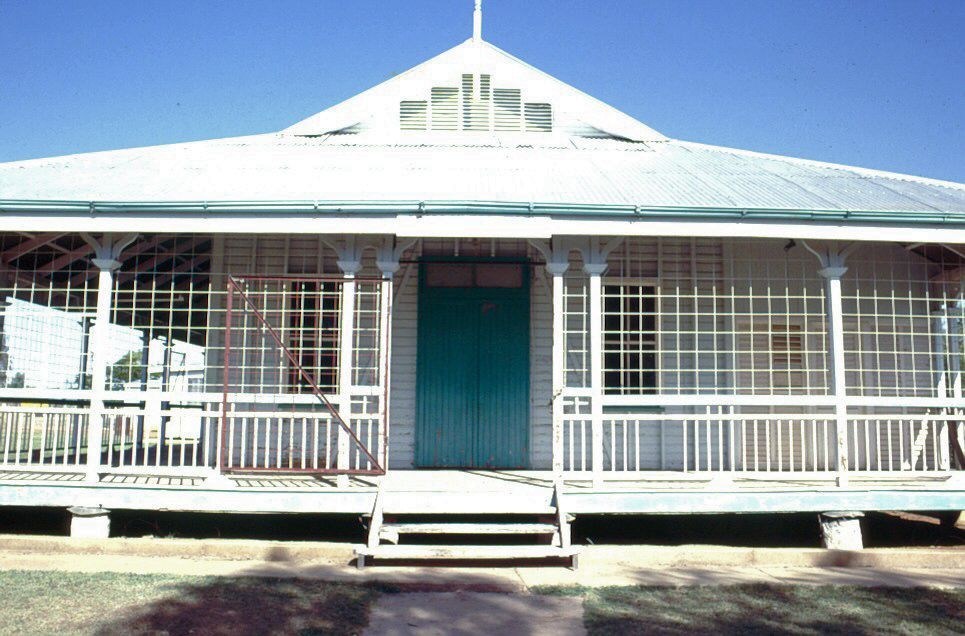
- Former Barkly Shire Hall

- Location within Queensland Location within Australia
- 19.9212°S 138.1205°E
- Location: Barkly Highway, Camooweal, City of Mount Isa, Queensland, Australia

History
- Design period: 1919–1930s (interwar period)
- Built: 1922–1923

Site notes
- Architect: Rooney Brothers

Queensland Heritage Register
- Official name: Community Hall, Camooweal, Barkly Tablelands Shire Hall
- Type: state heritage (built)
- Designated: 21 October 1992
- Reference no.: 600740
- Significant period: 1920s–1930s (fabric); 1920s–1960s (historical, social); 1920s–ongoing (social)
- Significant components: office/s, memorial – honour board/ roll of honour, hall
- Builders: Hogarth & Hammond

Community Hall is a heritage-listed former town hall at Barkly Highway, Camooweal, City of Mount Isa, Queensland, Australia. It was designed by Rooney Brothers and built from 1922 to 1923 by Hogarth & Hammond. It is also known as Barkly Tablelands Shire Hall. It was added to the Queensland Heritage Register on 21 October 1992.

== History ==
The Camooweal Community Hall was built in 1922–23 for the Barkly Tableland Shire Council as a council chambers and community hall.

William Landsborough was the first European to discover the Barkly Tableland were discovered while he was officially engaged in the search for Burke and Wills in 1861. He named it after Sir Henry Barkly, Governor of Victoria. The first European settlers were pastoralists who established sheep runs in the district a few years later. The recession of the late 1860s caused a withdrawal, but in the 1870s pastoral settlement started up again based on cattle. The area was part of Burke Division, later to become Burke Shire.

Camooweal was formed as a supply centre for pastoral runs at the junction of the Georgina stock route and Northern Territory road. It was surveyed in December 1883 and gazetted as a town in December 1884, the area of the reserve for township purposes being modified in 1894. Its position was important; it was on a major route midway between Burketown and Cloncurry and only 7 miles (11 km) from the border between the colony of Queensland and the Northern Territory then controlled by South Australia. It was not only the chief supply centre for a wide area but was also important as a customs post in the pre-Federation era when the affairs of the colonies were separate and customs duty an important source of Queensland Government revenue. Camooweal was supplied through Burketown and by 1892 was described in the Australian Handbook as being on a transport, post and telegraph route and having a customs post, court and police station besides 2 hotels and school and various service and supply businesses. It also served an important role as a social centre for a scattered community.

The Barclay Tableland Shire was formed on 10 February 1914 from portions of Burke and Cloncurry Shires with Camooweal at its centre. The name of the shire was changed to Barkly in 1919. The land on which the shire hall was constructed was a local government reserve on the corner of Nowranie Street and the Barkly Highway. The block also contained the police, court house and health reserves and so was a key administrative area in the town.

The hall was constructed for the shire in 1922–3 with the assistance of a Queensland Government loan of £3000 to be repaid within 10 years. Plans and specifications for the hall were drawn by the Townsville firm of Rooney Brothers, and Hogarth and Hammond carried out the construction, having submitted the lowest tender of £2207. Use of the hall was provided free to the hospital for entertainments and they also had use of the office for monthly meetings. The patriotic service rendered by many men from the district during the first World War was not forgotten and in 1924 an ornate Wunderlich honour board of copper mounted on timber was installed in the hall.

The hall was too small for the shire's needs and the population of the township and surrounding area was increasing, so in 1935 the Shire again applied to the Queensland Government for a subsidised loan. These were available to help provide work for the unemployed and it was proposed to extend the hall by 30 feet (9.1 m) and build a residence for the shire clerk. The loan was granted in order to provide work for the unemployed and consisted of £1450 as a loan and the same amount as a subsidy. Rooneys were sent the plans and specifications for the old building and asked to prepare plans for the new work to match. The tender of H Wilder of Julia Creek was accepted, being £598 for construction of the hall and £895.00 for the residence. At a much later date a small flat was attached to the rear of the hall.

During the second World War, the Barkly Highway was sealed to accommodate supply convoys and Camooweal became an important refuelling stop. The airport was sealed and served as an important base.

The hall has been the venue for all important occasions in the town and has been used for church services, weddings, dances, concerts, weddings, as a voting booth and to entertain important visitors to Camooweal.

On 15 December 1962 the shire became Mount Isa Shire, reflecting the growth and importance of this centre and then was named City of Mt Isa on 1 June 1968. Major work was carried out on the hall in 1984 for the celebration of Camooweal's centenary and again in 1993.

== Description ==
The Camooweal Community Hall is located in a prominent position on the Barkly Highway in the centre of Camooweal. It is a single storey timber building with wide encircling verandahs set on low stumps and has a gambrel roof clad in corrugated iron.

The hall is rectangular in plan with the main entrance from the short axis to Nowranie Street. Entry is by a short flight of steps and there is a central front door flanked by sash windows. The exterior walls have exposed studs and French doors open onto the verandahs along the north and south sides. The verandah roof is supported on timber posts linked by dowel balustrading. The southern verandah has been enclosed by the addition of timber louvres and there are offices on the eastern side.

The hall ceilings are sheeted in decorative pressed metal. Local honour rolls in pressed copper are housed within the hall on the east wall.

A small accommodation unit with a bedroom, kitchen and bathroom adjoins the north east corner of the building.

== Heritage listing ==
Community Hall, Camooweal was listed on the Queensland Heritage Register on 21 October 1992 having satisfied the following criteria.

The place is important in demonstrating the evolution or pattern of Queensland's history.

The Camooweal hall demonstrates the way in which much of western Queensland was settled by means of small service towns on supply routes. They provided a scattered population with essential goods, services, administrative facilities and the social structure to develop a sense of community. The hall also has important associations with the former Barkly Tablelands Shire which has since been absorbed into the Mount Isa local authority.

The place is important in demonstrating the principal characteristics of a particular class of cultural places.

The Camooweal Community Hall is a fine example of a timber shire hall in the vernacular style which has been extended over time while adhering to the original design principles. The wide verandahs with French doors opening out onto them and timber louvres illustrate traditional means of providing shade and ventilation in a hot arid climate.

The place is important because of its aesthetic significance.

The Community Hall is an important public building in a prominent location and in form, scale and material makes an important visual contribution to the townscape of Camooweal.

The place has a strong or special association with a particular community or cultural group for social, cultural or spiritual reasons.

The Community Hall has had a long connection with the people of Camooweal and the surrounding district as the focus for a range of important community services and social events.
