= Tree of Science =

Tree of Science may refer to:

- Tree of Science (Ramon Llull), a 1295–96 encyclopedia by Ramon Llull
- Tree of Science (sculpture), a 1966 sculpture by Tamer Başoğlu

== See also ==
- Tree of Knowledge (disambiguation)
