= Camooweal Airport =

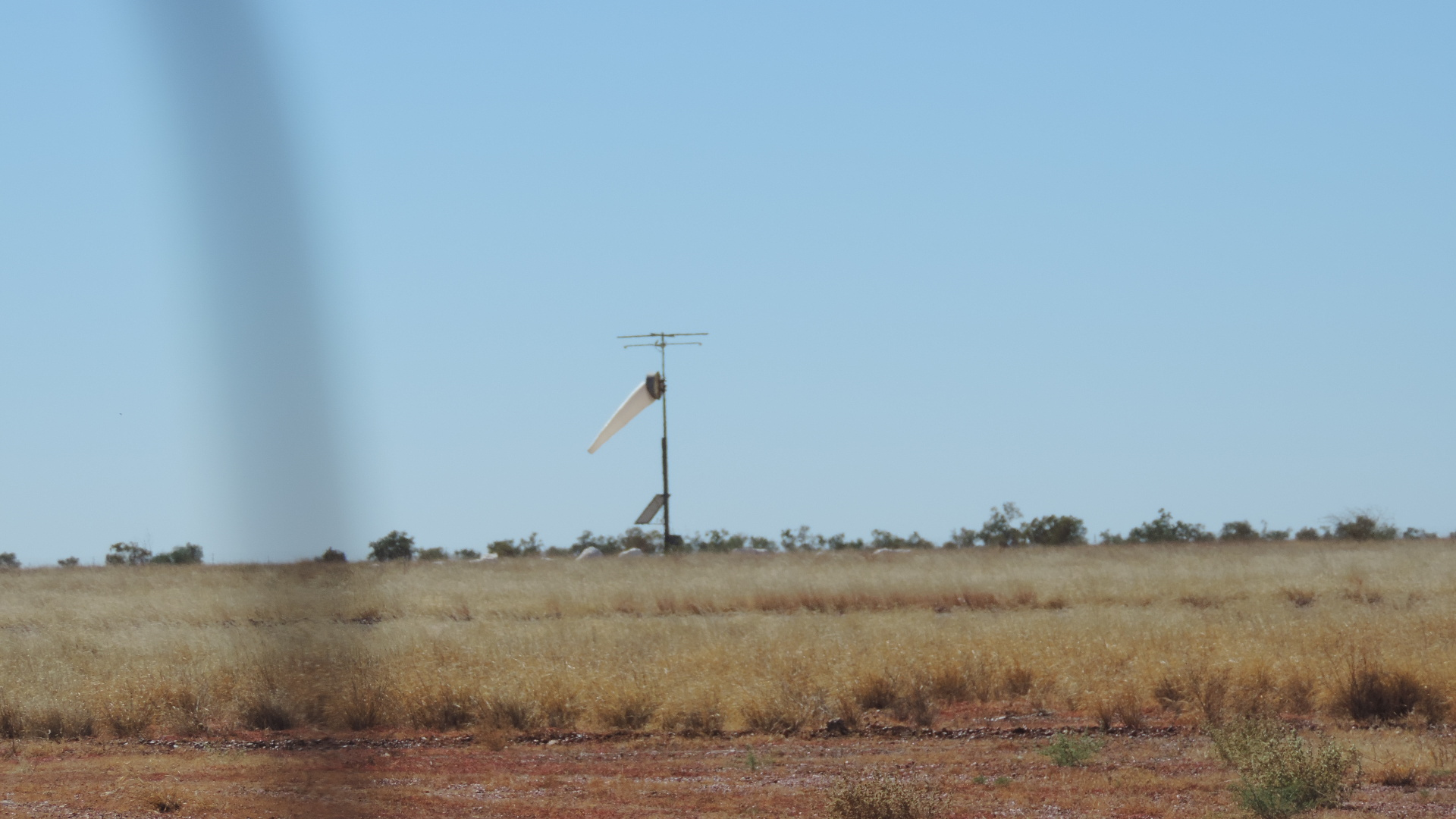
- Camooweal Airport, 2019
- IATA: CML; ICAO: YCMW

Summary
- Airport type: Public
- Operator: Mount Isa City Council
- Location: Camooweal, Queensland, Australia
- Elevation AMSL: 780 ft / 238 m
- Coordinates: 19°54′50″S 138°07′27″E

Map
- Location in Queensland

Runways
| Direction | Length | | Surface |
| Direction | m | ft | Surface |
|---|---|---|---|
| 13/31 | 1,238 | 4,062 | Bitumen |
- Sources: Australian AIP and aerodrome chart

Camooweal Airport (IATA: CML, ICAO: YCMW) is located 0.4 nautical miles (0.74 km; 0.46 mi) northeast of Camooweal, Queensland, Australia. The airport is operated by the Mount Isa City Council and is mainly used by the Royal Flying Doctor Service to support the operation of weekly medical clinics for the Camooweal community. The airport also functions as a base to land supplies and perform evacuations during emergencies such as flooding.

== History ==
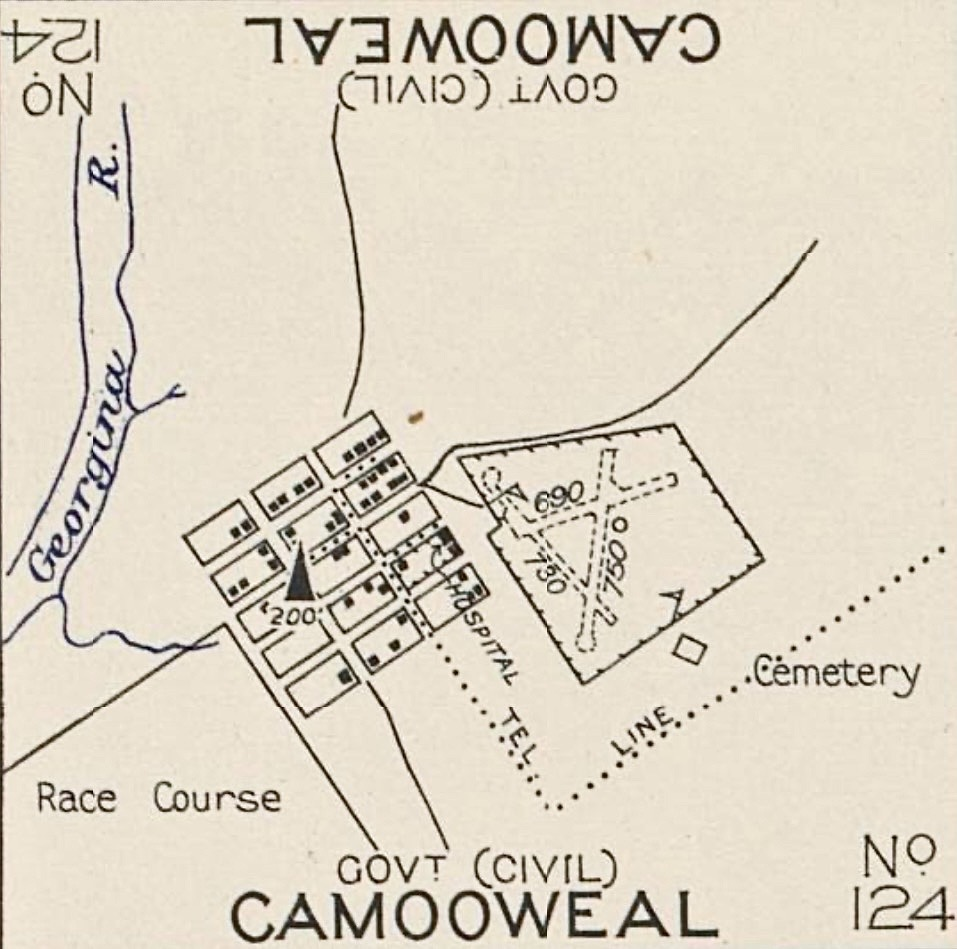
Map of Camooweal and its Aerodrome from May 1939.

The discussions of Camooweal as a stop in an air route towards England from Melbourne began in August 1919. The chain was to include Longreach, Camooweal, Alexandria, Brunette Downs, eventually joining Newcastle Downs. An alternative route was also discussed, although it excluded the town. In November 1925, the aerodrome was inspected by three airport inspectors, with the prospects of bringing it up to Qantas standards. Afterwards, they continued onwards to Darwin. Following the works, Qantas opened a passenger service between Cloncurry and Camooweal in 1926.

The first airmail service began here in 1930. During World War II, the Royal Australian Air Force extended and sealed the runway for use as a refuelling point and emergency landing ground. Presently, the Royal Flying Doctor Service operates at Camooweal Airport.

== Facilities ==
Aside from the sealed runway 13/31 which is 1,238 m (4,062 ft) and a small apron area, there are minimal facilities at the airport. Solar powered lighting for the runway and apron areas is available for emergencies at night. Arriving and departing aircraft coordinate movements using a Common Traffic Advisory Frequency as there is no control tower at the isolated airstrip. A Non-Directional Beacon navigational aid is located close to the airport.

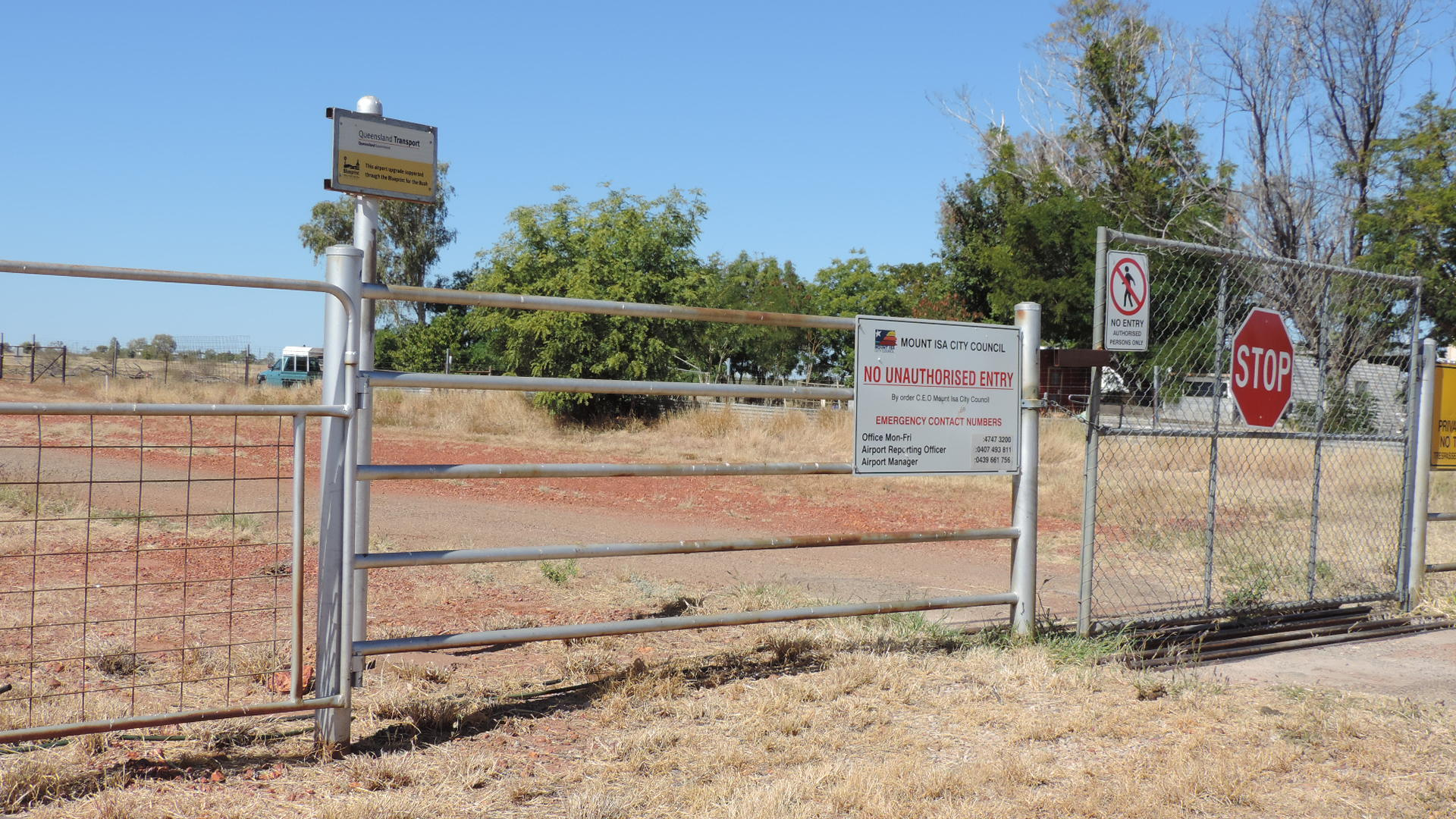
Entrance to the airport, 2019

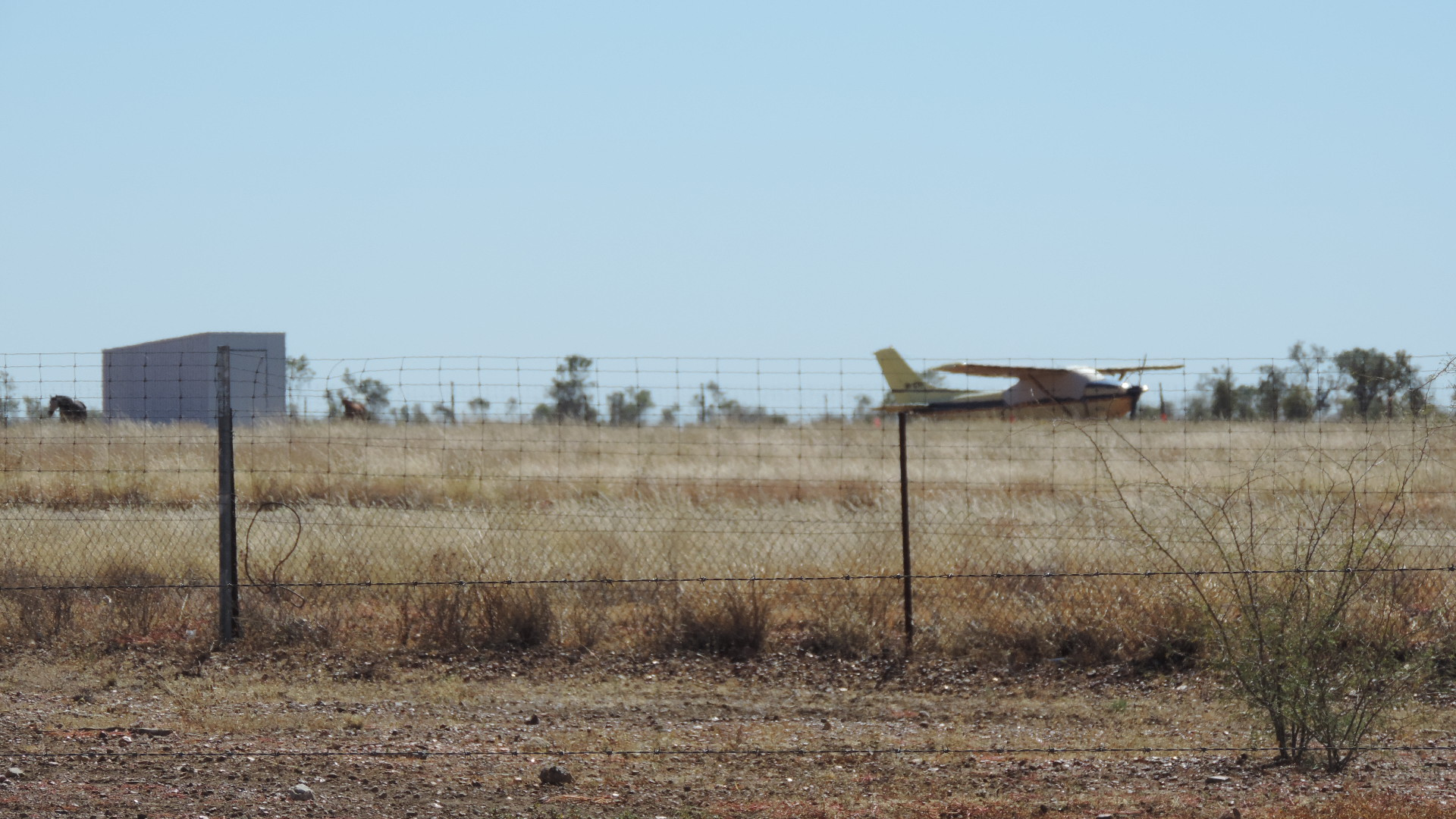
Plane on the runway, 2019

== See also ==
- List of airports in Queensland
