= Camooweal =

- Town
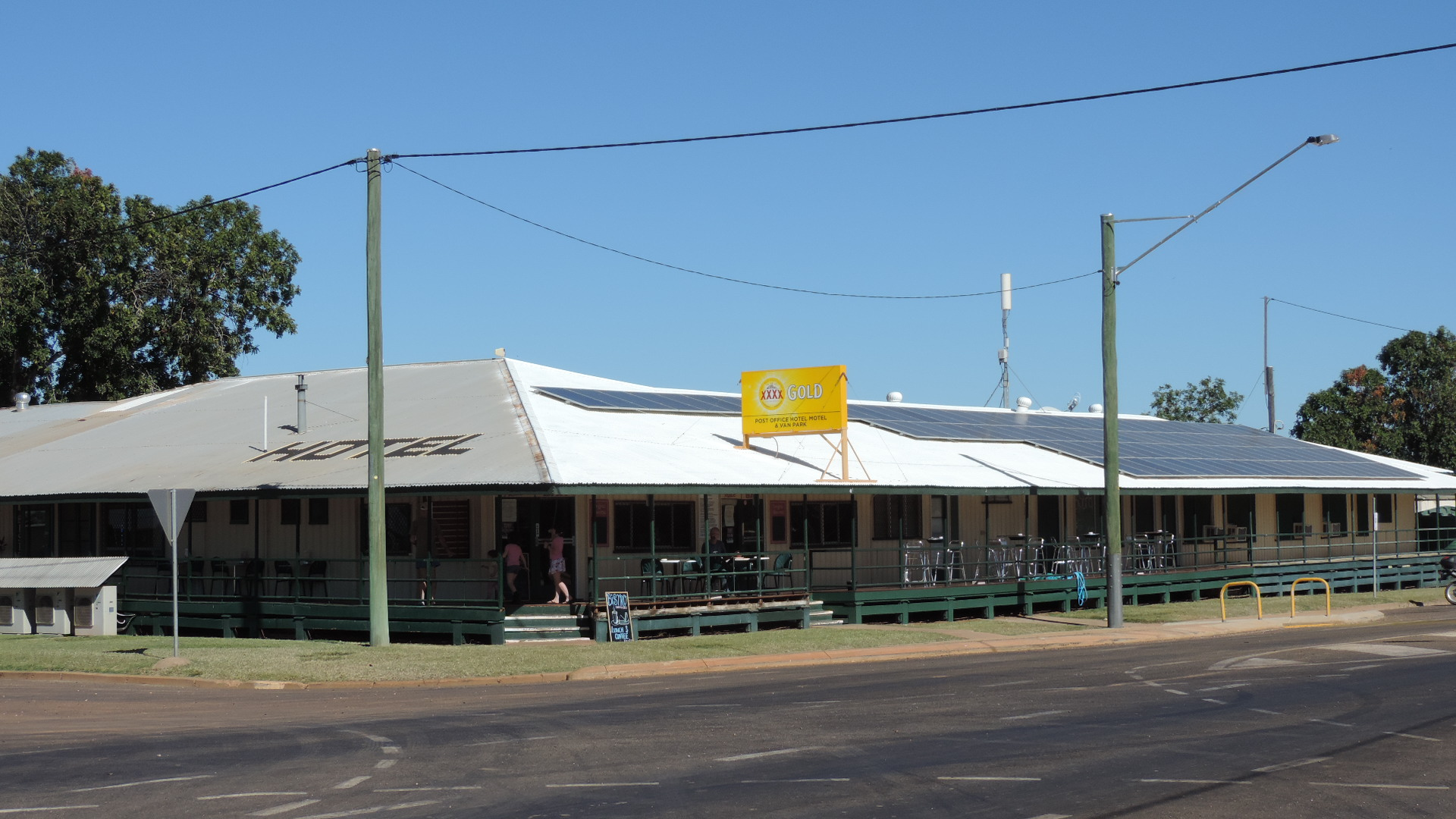
- Post Office Hotel, 2019

- Interactive map of Camooweal
- Coordinates: 19.9211°S 138.1194°E
- Country: Australia
- State: Queensland
- LGA: City of Mount Isa
- Location: 190 km (120 mi) NW of Mount Isa; 471 km (293 mi) E of Tennant Creek (NT); 1,094 km (680 mi) W of Townsville; 1,410 km (880 mi) SE of Darwin (NT); 2,015 km (1,252 mi) NW of Brisbane
- Established: 1884

Government
  - State electorate: Traeger
  - Federal division: Kennedy

Area
  - Total: 9,537.0 km^{2} (3,682.3 sq mi)
- Elevation: 231.2 m (759 ft)

Population
  - Total: 236 (2021 census)
  - Density: 0.02475/km^{2} (0.06409/sq mi)
- Time zone: UTC+10:00 (AEST)
- Postcode: 4828
- Mean max temp: 32.9 °C (91.2 °F)
- Mean min temp: 17.7 °C (63.9 °F)
- Annual rainfall: 399.4 mm (15.72 in)
Localities around Camooweal
Northern Territory	Lawn Hill	Gregory
Northern Territory	Camooweal	Gunpowder
Northern Territory	Barkly	Mount Isa (locality)

Camooweal is an outback town and locality in the City of Mount Isa, Queensland, Australia. The locality is on the Queensland border with the Northern Territory. In the 2021 census, the locality of Camooweal had a population of 236 people.

== Geography ==
The locality of Camooweal is in north-western in the Gulf Region bounded by the west by the Northern Territory. The town of Camooweal is located in the south-west corner of the locality. The town is 169 kilometres (105 mi) north-west of the city of Mount Isa and 12 km (7.5 mi) east of the Northern Territory border.

The Barkly Highway enters the locality from the south (Barkly), passes from east to west through the town centre (where it is known as Barkly Street) and then exits to the west (Northern Territory).

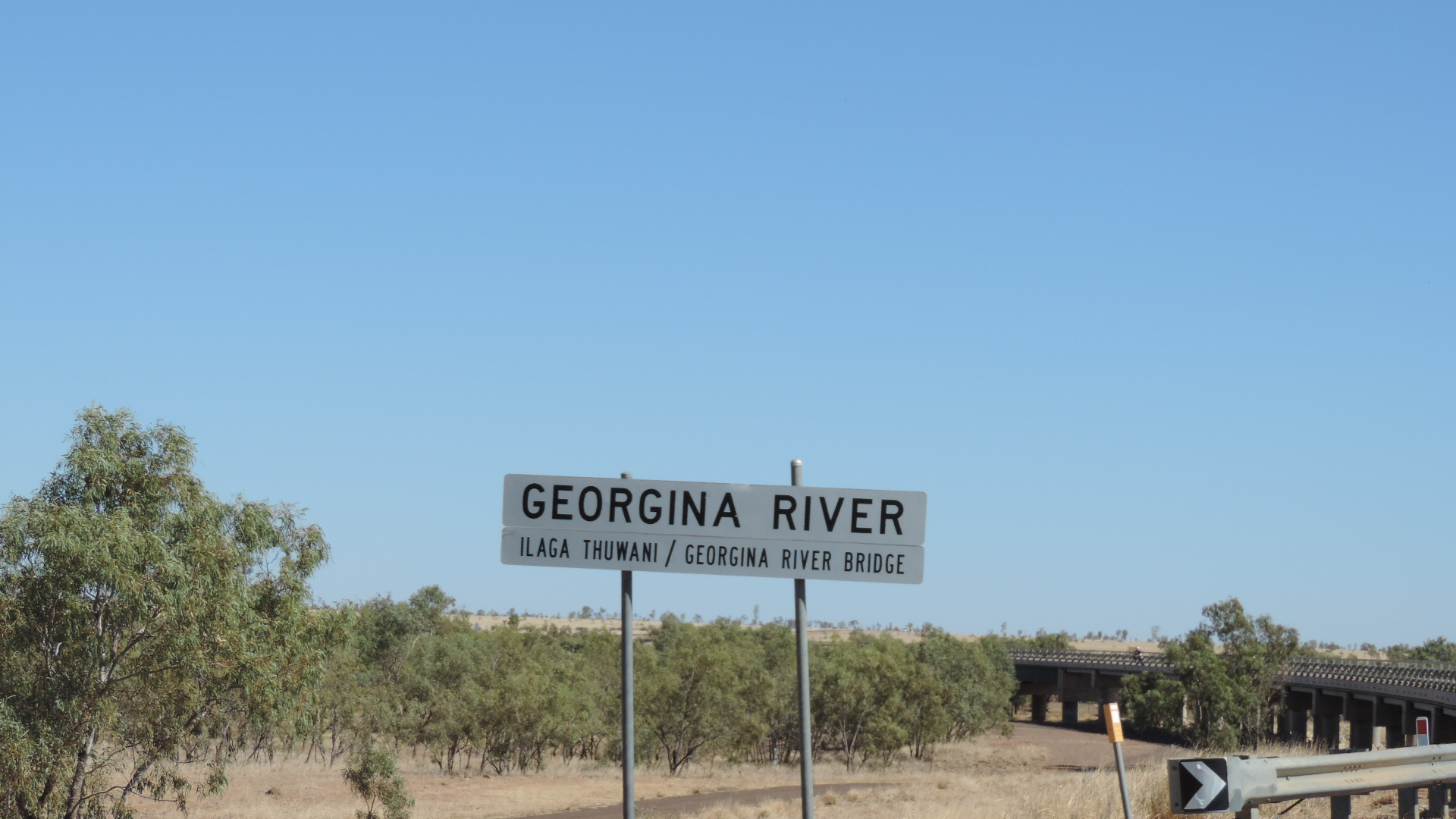
Crossing the bridge over the waterless Georgina River on the Barkly High heading west out of Camooweal, 2019

The Georgina River enters the locality from the west (Northern Territory), passes to the immediate west of the town and then exits to south of the locality (Barkly). Lake Francis (19.9272°S 138.1161°E) and Lake Canellan (19.9486°S 138.1072°E) are both on the Georgina River and lie to the south-east of the town. Lake Mary (19.8666°S 138.1°E) is another lake on the river 7 kilometres (4.3 mi) north-west of town.

The locality is a drainage divide running from the north-west to the south-east of the locality. The watercourses in the north and east of the locality are tributaries of the Nicholson River which flows into the Gulf of Carpentaria to the north. Gulf drainage Whereas the watercourses in the south and west of the locality are tributaries of the Georgina River which is part of the Lake Eyre drainage basin.

Camooweal has the following mountains:

- Dog Tooth (19.5597°S 138.6786°E) 287 metres (942 ft)
- Quality Knobs (19.6095°S 138.6771°E) 280 metres (920 ft)

The Camooweal Caves National Park (20.0178°S 138.1911°E) is a 13,800-hectare (34,000-acre) protected area in the south-west of the locality to the south-east of the town. Crater of Caves is an area (20.05°S 138.1833°E) within the park. Cavern is another area with caves but outside of the national park (19.8166°S 138.0833°E).

Apart from the national park, the predominant land use in the locality is grazing on native vegetation.

== History ==
=== Indigenous ===
The area was originally inhabited by the Indjilandji Indigenous Australians.

=== British exploration ===
In 1861, an expedition led by William Landsborough became the first British incursion into the area. Landsborough named the Barkly Tablelands after the Governor of Victoria, Sir Henry Barkly. He also named a waterhole Lake Francis after his niece Frances Landsborough, around which the future town of Camooweal was built. Landsborough found the Aboriginal people abundant in the vicinity, writing that:

"This place seems a favourite resort for blacks...there were about one hundred blacks in the neighbourhood of the camp some of whom were so bold that I feared it might be necessary to shoot some of them."

=== Establishment of Rocklands Station ===
In 1865, colonist George Sutherland arrived at Mary Lake with 8,000 sheep to establish Rocklands sheep station. He described their arrival as:

"On the left bank of the river at the lake [was] a large camp of blacks, on rushed the sheep through fires, blacks, and all other impediments to quench their thirst. The unfortunate niggers had a terrible time of it. To be roused up out of their sleep at midnight by some 8,000 sheep rushing madly and tumbling over them was chaos, was something demonical to the simple natives, who never saw, or heard of jumbucks before."

The Aboriginal inhabitants resisted Sutherland's aim to dispossess them.

"After the fright the blacks got on the night of our arrival to rob them of their country, we thought the poor wretches would give us a very wide berth, [however] a shower of spears, nulla-nullas, and other waddies came flying in all directions. Unfortunately only one of the whole party had any firearms, all left in the tents. The one possessing a revolver fired twice at the niggers, haphazard in the dark. Of course all made a rush to the tents, to secure, firearms, but in the dark these were not easily found, and had the savages followed us up, they could easily have massacred the lot of us. However they didn’t, but grabbed and took everything they could lay hands on."

The next morning Sutherland and his companions, armed and mounted, went to pursue "the niggers" but only found an empty camp. They returned to Francis Lake and started work to survey and form the property. Some Aboriginal men defiantly returned to place bird traps and one of Sutherland's workers:

"walked up to them, revolver in hand. They started away and he turned round to walk back. As he did one of the myalls swung round and hit him a terrific blow on the back of the head which rendered him insensible for three days. Fortunately the deed was noticed from the camp and two or three rushed down on foot and fired, but the niggers got clean away."

However, drought soon set in with the Mary and Francis lakes drying up. Sutherland shifted his camp and stock to nearby Don Creek where the Aborigines had taken refuge. Sutherland, with the assistance of a fellow grazier William Lyne, resorted to force to displace them once more, writing that:

"Lyne and Steiglitz were camped for some time with their sheep...looking for country to take up. Noticing several blacks’ fires near us, we deemed it fully time to make a raid, and drive them back. Mr Lyne and myself...met a large mob of the niggers...as the darkies advanced...we were prepared to stand our ground and fight the battle out...one of our party raised his carbine [and] fired, and [they] all fled back for their lives, but to frighten them we kept trotting behind them to give them a further scare and make them understand we were their masters".

Flood, drought and the cost of transportation of wool forced Sutherland to abandon Rocklands by 1869.

The Englishmen Benjamin Crosthwaite and William Tetley, who were marginally more successful, took up the lease again in 1876.

=== Camooweal township ===
The origin of the town's name is uncertain. One theory is that it take its name from surveyor George Telford Weale, who surveyed the area using camels in the early 1880s. The word for water from many now extinct Indigenous languages across central and western Queensland was camoo.

The initial town was gazetted in 1884 to be built on a 4-square-mile (10 km^{2}) plot by Lake Francis. A year later the present site was re-gazetted. The Rocklands Post Office was removed and Camooweal Post Office opened on 27 April 1885. A police station opened in 1886.

Camooweal Provisional School opened on 5 June 1893. On 1 January 1909 it became Camooweal State School.

The town bore was drilled in 1897.

On 2 January 1931, a Qantas Air Ambulance from the Royal Flying Doctor Service of Australia flown by E.G. Donaldson rescued a man in Camooweal and delivered him to Brisbane.

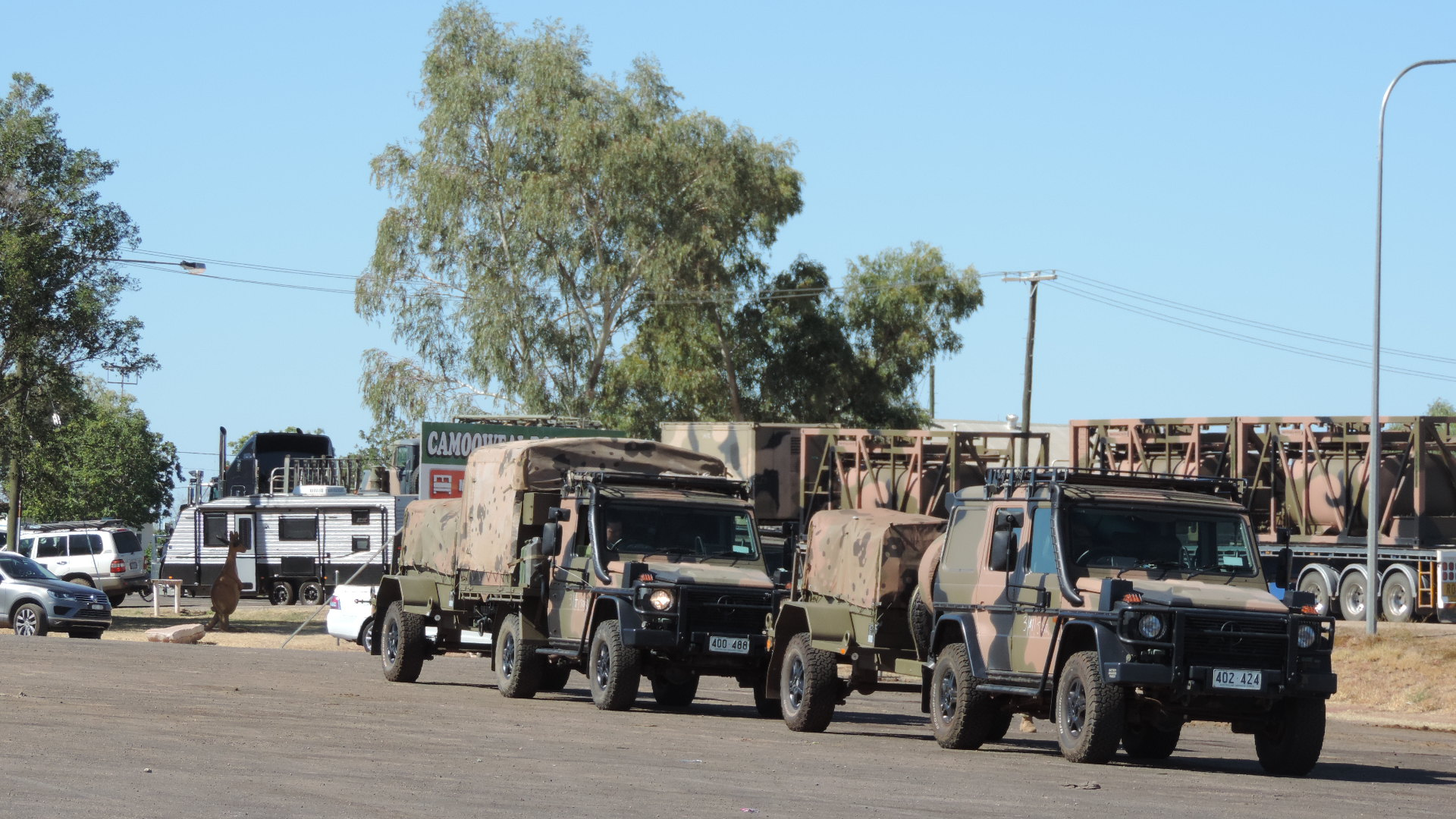
Convoys of Australian Army vehicles at Camooweal, travelling along the Barkly Highway, 2019

The road through Camooweal to the Northern Territory (now the Barkly Highway) was the inland defence route for World War II. This road was built by army engineers and carried over 1000 vehicles a day and there are numerous historical sites marked along the road.

The town had electricity from 1952.

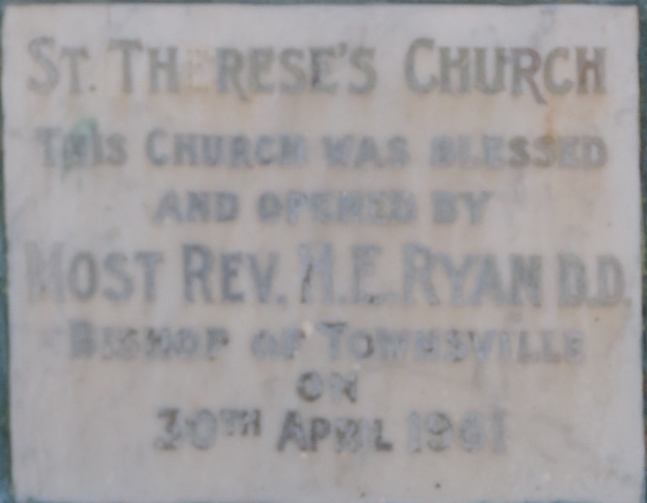
Plaque commemorating the opening of St Therese's Catholic Church on 30 April 1961

St Therese's Catholic Church was officially opened on 30 April 1961 by Hugh Edward Ryan, Bishop of Townsville.

The Camooweal Caves National Park was gazetted on 16 December 1994.

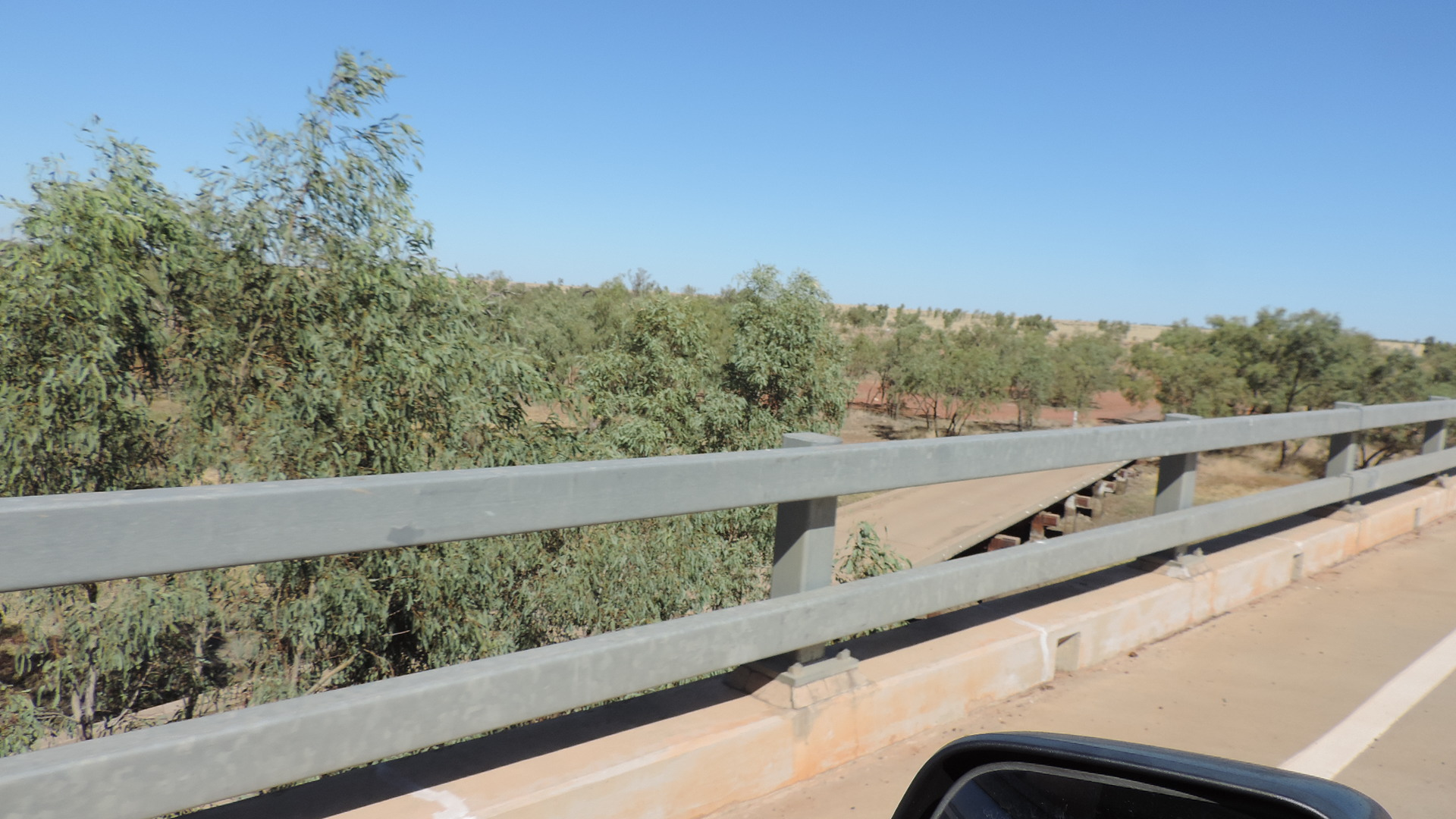
Driving across the Georgina River Bridge from Camooweal looking south towards the old bridge below, 2019

Given the economic importance of transport on the Barkly Highway (the only sealed road between Queensland and the Northern Territory), a longstanding problem was the flooding of the Georgina River at Camooweal. During floods, the Barkly Highway bridge over the Georgina River was often unusable for many days, with road trains and other heavy vehicles having to wait weeks before it was safe to cross. To alleviate these problems, the new Georgina River Bridge was officially opened on 20 December 2002 by Senator Ron Boswell and Steve Breadhauer, Minister for Transport in the Queensland Government. It replaced the previous bridge which was approximately 50 metres (160 ft) south and was both higher and longer so traffic on the highway could continue to cross during floods. The bridge is 417 metres (1,368 ft) long and is accompanied by a 5.6-kilometre (3.5 mi) highway deviation west from Camooweal. The bridge uses an unusual arch design to avoid placing pylons into the river bed which is culturally significant to the local Dugalunji people, who call the new bridge Ilaga Thuwani meaning The Camping Ground of the Rainbow Serpent.

In 2005 the Mount Isa City Council erected a war memorial outside the community hall (former shire hall of the Shire of Barkly Tableland).

== Demographics ==
In the 2011 census, the locality of Camooweal had a population of 187 people.

In the 2016 census, the locality of Camooweal had a population of 208 people.

In the 2021 census, the locality of Camooweal had a population of 236 people.

== Heritage listings ==
Camooweal has a number of heritage-listed sites, including:

- Community Hall, 32 Barkly Street (19.9212°S 138.1205°E)
- Freckleton's Stores, 44 Barkly Street (19.9212°S 138.1183°E)
- Tree of Knowledge, Barkly Highway (19.919°S 138.1139°E)
- Hodgkinson's Marked Tree, Rocklands Station (19.854°S 138.1062°E)

== Education ==
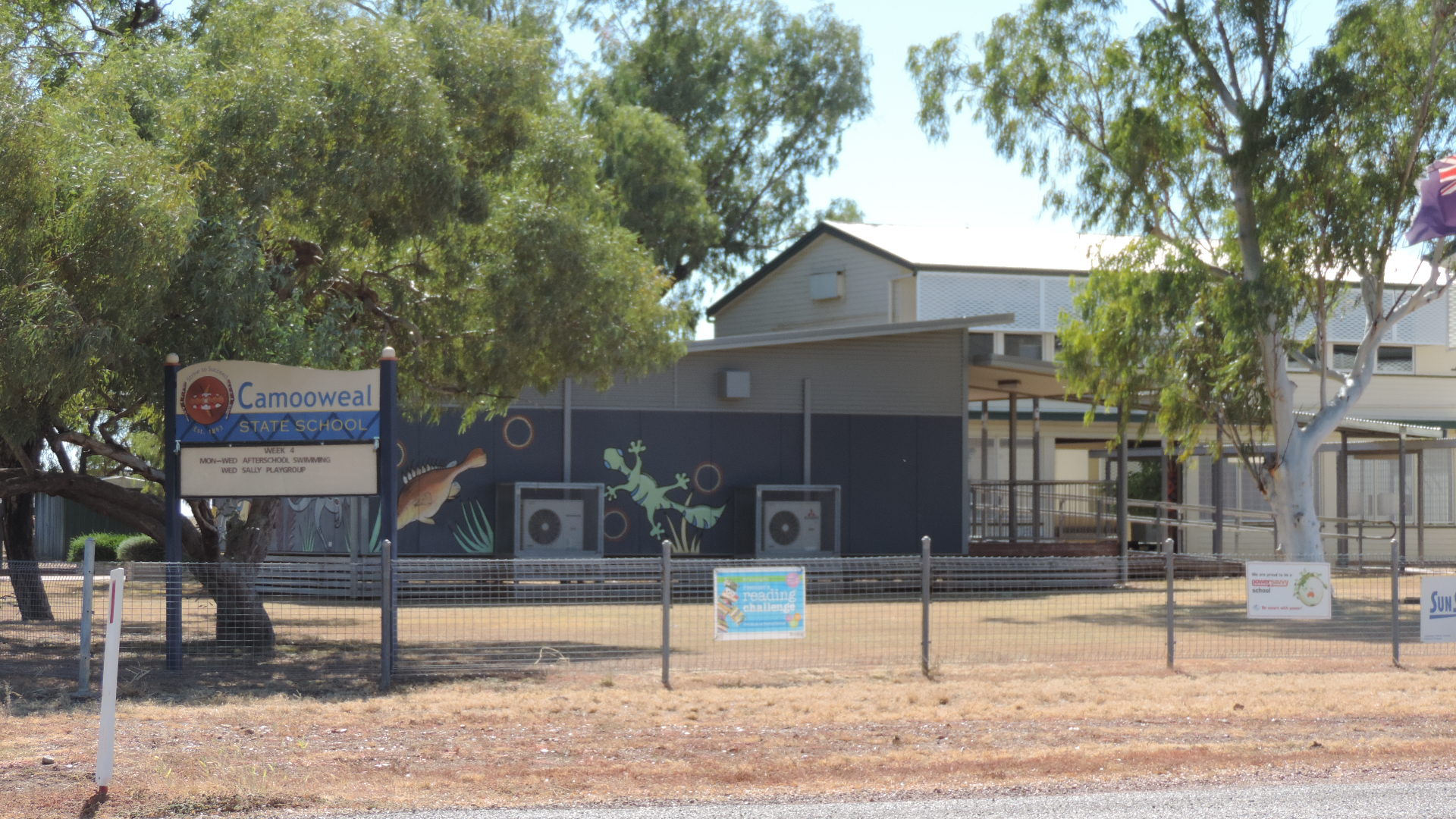
Camooweal State School, 2019

Camooweal State School is a government primary (Early Childhood to Year 6) school for boys and girls at Nowranie Street (19.9188°S 138.1203°E). In 2018, the school had an enrolment of 31 students with 3 teachers and 5 non-teaching staff (3 full-time equivalent).

There are no secondary schools within reach of the locality (the nearest is Spinifex State College in Mount Isa). The options are distance education and boarding school. Spinifex State College has boarding facilities.

== Economy ==
There are a number of homesteads in the locality, including:

- Don (20.1137°S 138.1230°E)
- Morstone (19.5261°S 138.3655°E)
- No 3 Outstation (19.3563°S 138.0750°E)
- Old Morstone (19.4372°S 138.5017°E)
- Rocklands (19.8611°S 138.1021°E)
- Split Rock (19.9024°S 138.6518°E)
- Thorntonia (19.5027°S 138.9444°E)
- Undilla (19.6242°S 138.6384°E)

== Transport ==
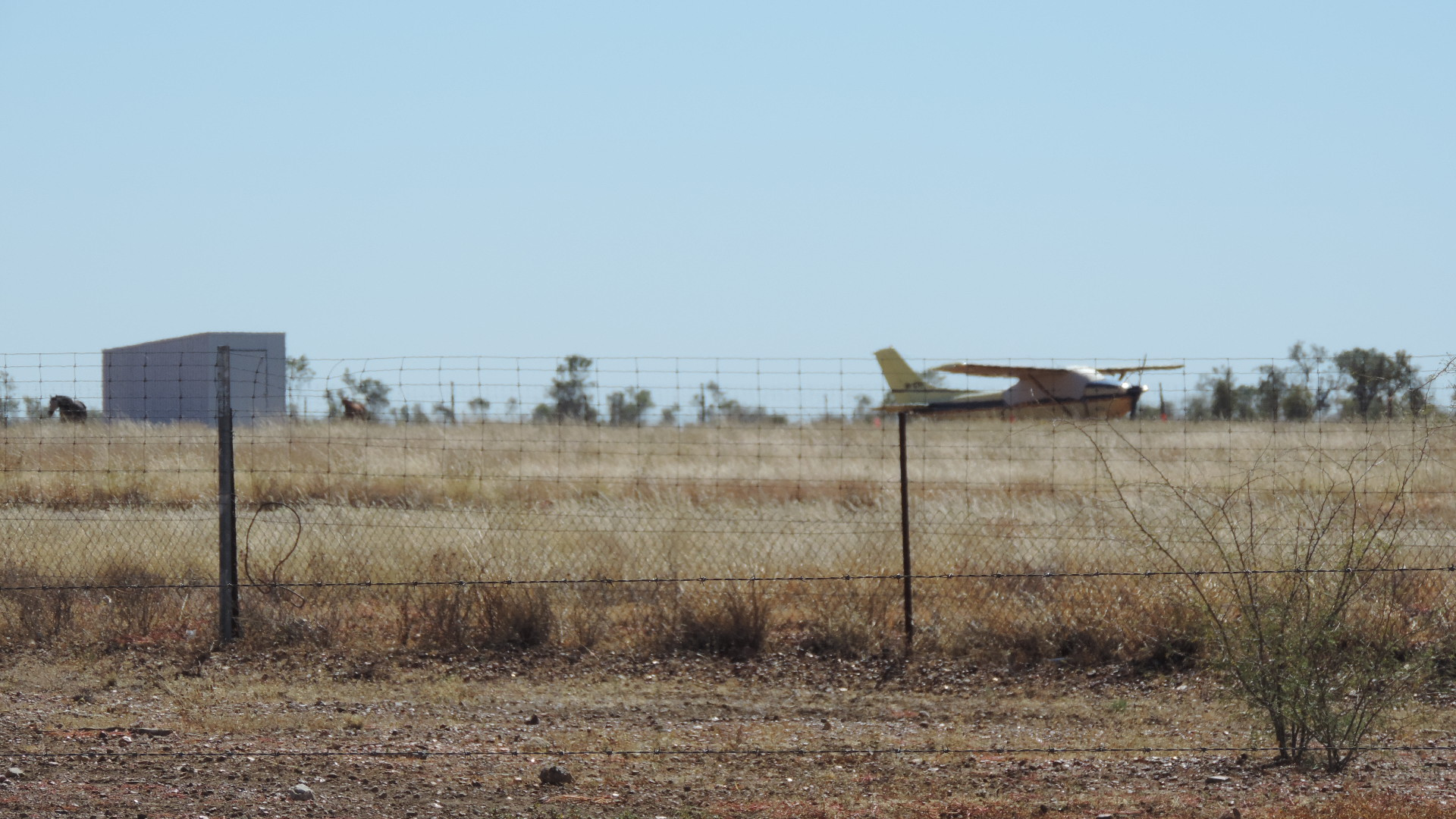
Camooweal Airport, 2019

Camooweal Airport serves the town and is just to the north-east of the town (19.9146°S 138.1252°E).

There are numerous airstrips in the locality including:

- Camooweal Caves NP airstrip (19.9902°S 138.1739°E)
- Herbert Vale airstrip (also known as No 3 Outstation) (19.3602°S 138.0751°E)
- Morstone airstrip (19.5100°S 138.3677°E)
- Rocklands airstrip #1 (19.8703°S 138.1045°E)
- Rocklands airstrip #2 (19.8833°S 138.3953°E)
- Rocklands airstrip #3 (19.7462°S 138.0351°E)
- Rocklands airstrip #4 (19.7839°S 138.2317°E) near Chester Creek bore
- Rocklands airstrip #5 (19.8204°S 138.3516°E) near Coolibah Dam
- Rocklands airstrip #6 (also known as Darien Gate) (19.2731°S 138.0565°E)
- Thorntonia airstrip (19.5102°S 138.9419°E)
- Undilla airstrip (also known as Promised Land) (19.6215°S 138.6325°E)

== Facilities ==
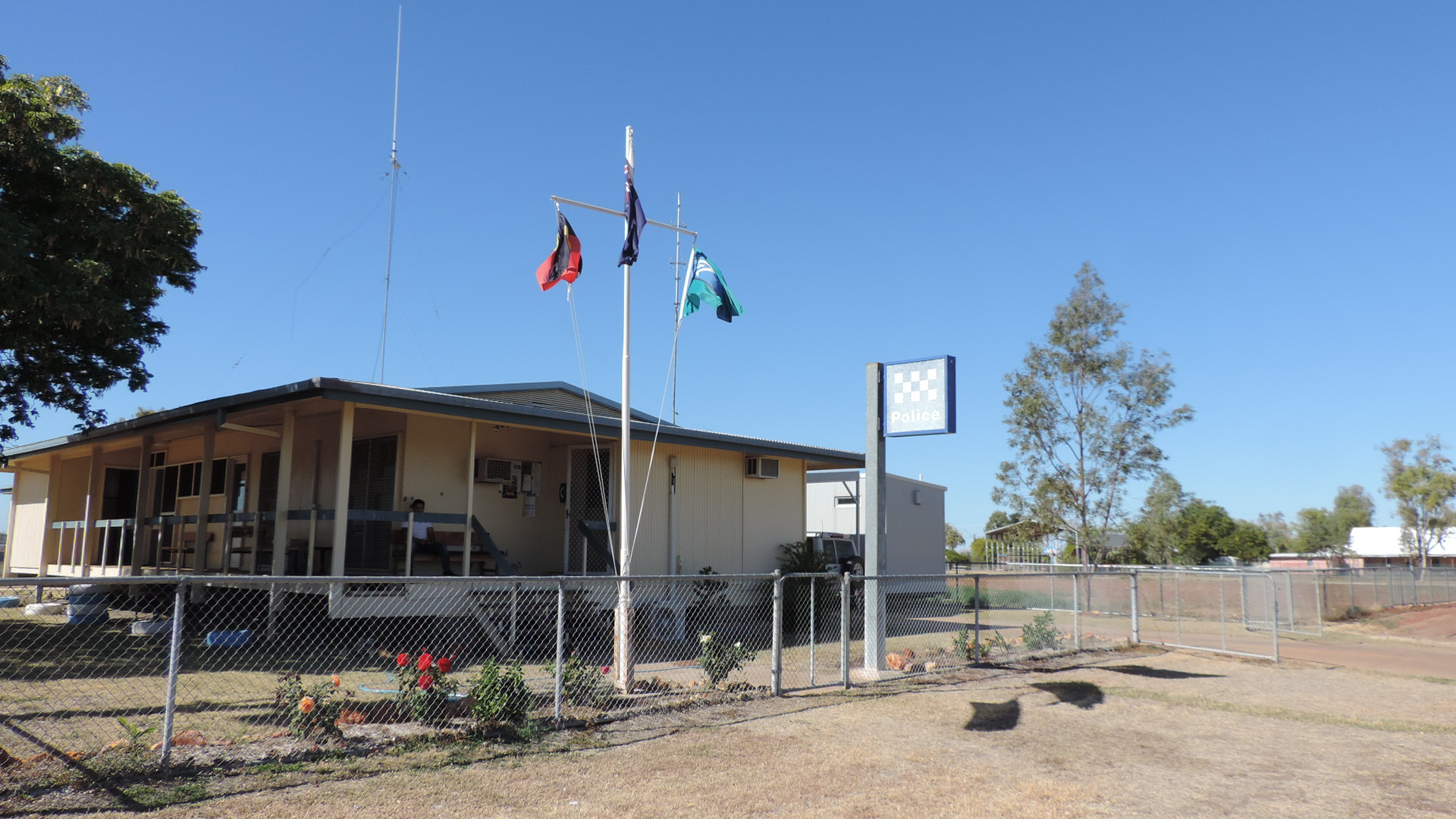
Police station, 2019

Camooweal Police Station is at 40 Nowranie Street (19.9197°S 138.1205°E).

Camooweal Volunteer Rural Fire Service and SES Facility is at 21 Barkly Street (19.9219°S 138.1214°E).

Camooweal Primary Health Care Clinic and ambulance station is at 52–60 Morrison Street (19.9182°S 138.1220°E).

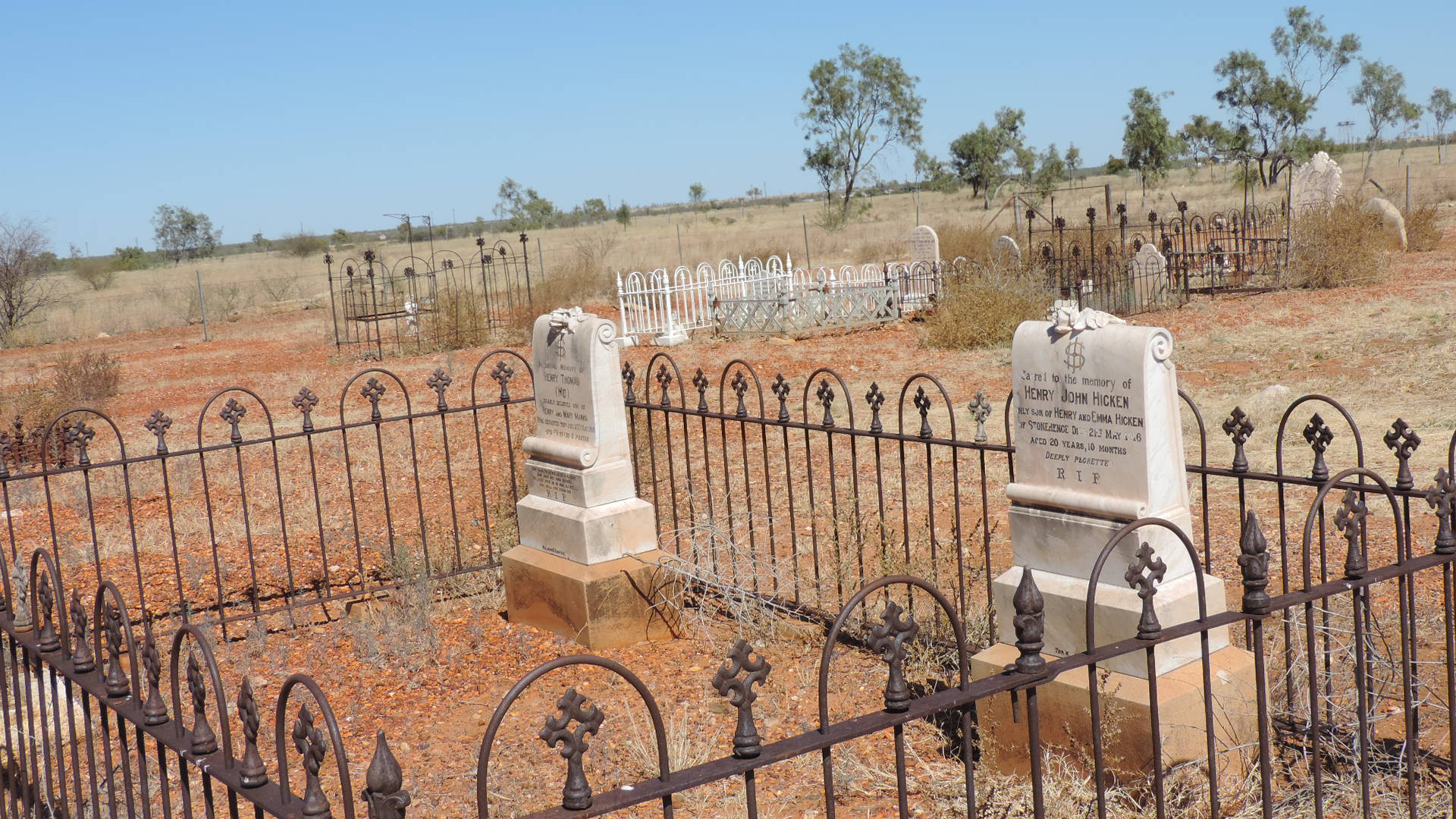
Camooweal Cemetery, 2019

Camooweal Cemetery is at the end of Cemetery Road, east of the airport (19.9142°S 138.1298°E). It is operated by the Mount Isa City Council.

== Amenities ==
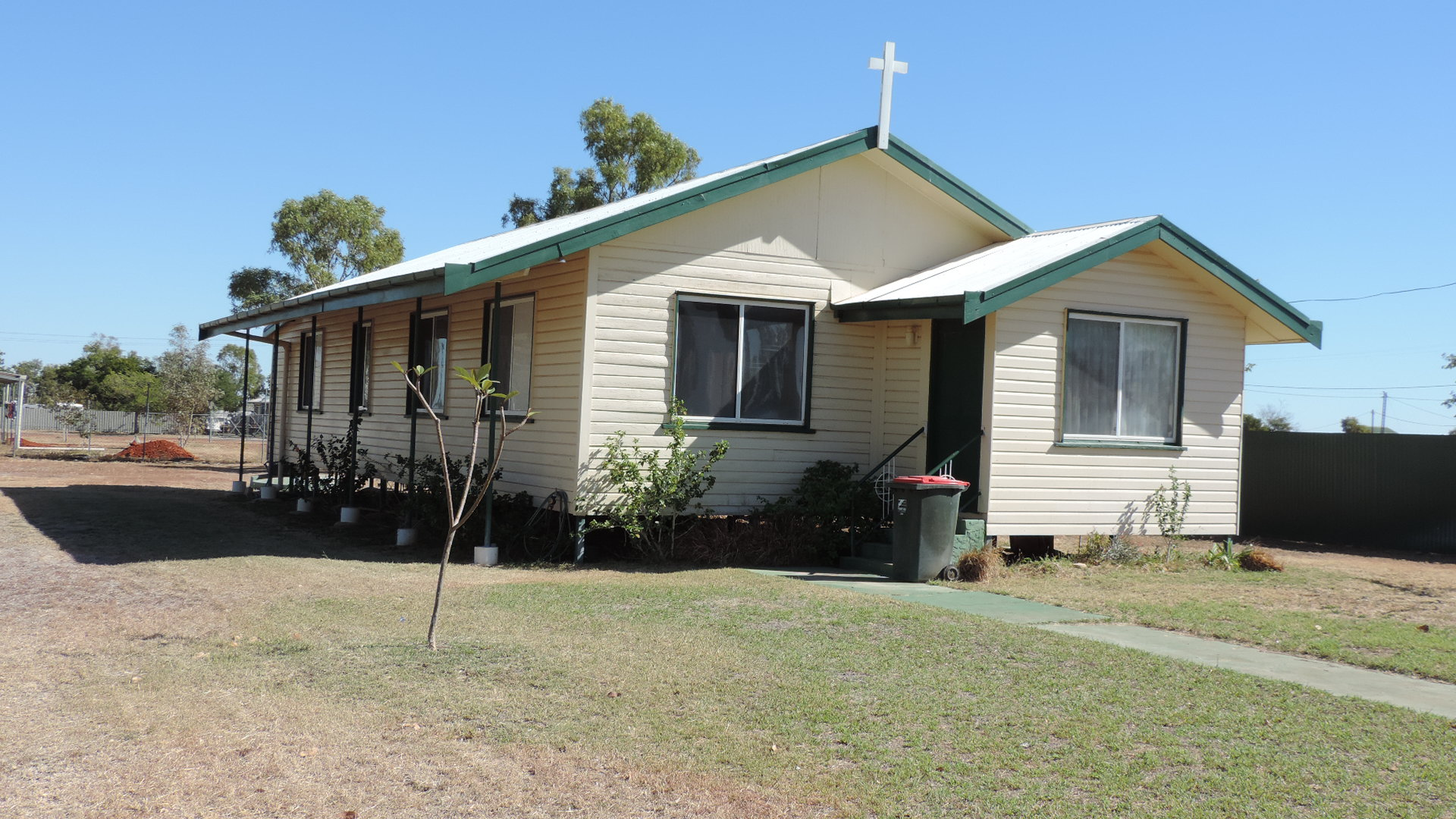
St Therese's Catholic Church, 2019

St Theresa's Catholic Church is at 31 Nowranie Street (19.9204°S 138.1199°E). It is part of the Good Shepherd Catholic Parish in Mount Isa.

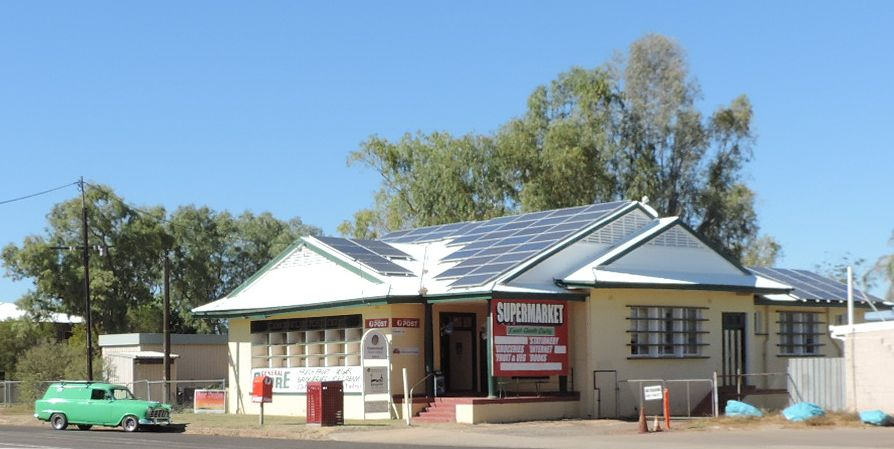
Camooweal post office, 2019

Camooweal Post Office is at 29 Barkly Street (19.9217°S 138.1206°E).

The Post Office Hotel Motel and Caravan Park at 39 Barkly Street (19.9216°S 138.1198°E) provides accommodation, food and drink.

There are a number of parks in the area:

- Sportsground (cricket & tennis), 19 Barkly Street (19.9227°S 138.1217°E)
- Ellen Finlay Memorial Park, 26–30 Nowranie Street (19.9207°S 138.1206°E)
- Cronin Park (racecourse and showgrounds), Camooweal Urandangi Road (19.9269°S 138.1239°E)

Along the main road (the Barkly Highway) there are several caravan stops or van parks which will take mobile homes and tents.

== Attractions ==
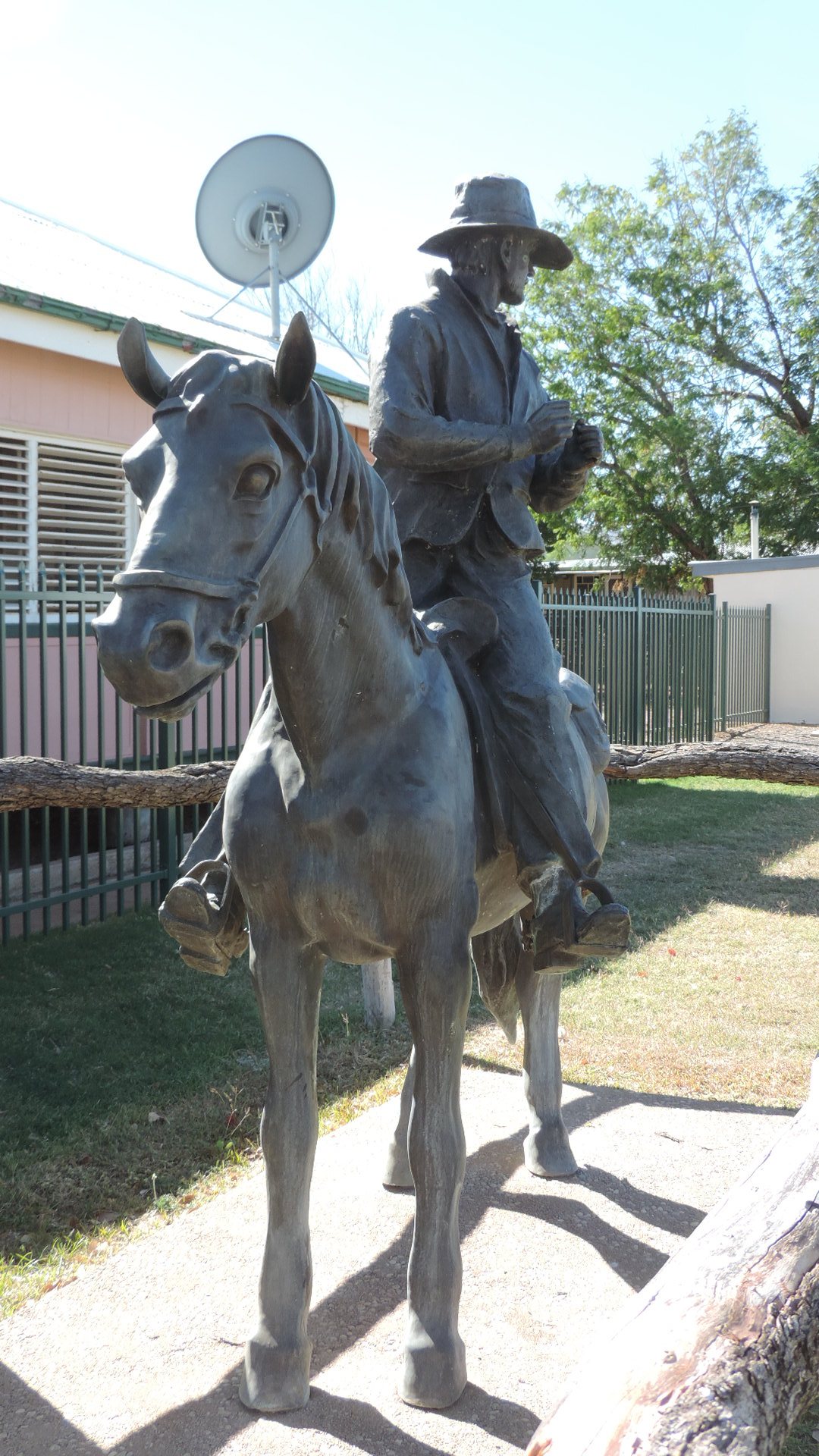
Statue of a drover on horseback, 2019

The Drover's Camp is a museum celebrating the contribution of drovers. It is just off the Barkly Highway about 1 kilometre (0.62 mi) east of the town at 56 Beaumont Street (19.9216°S 138.1332°E).

== Events ==
The Drover's Camp Festival is held annually in August. It was not held in 2020 due to the COVID-19 pandemic.

There are regular rodeos, gymkhanas, campdrafting and horse racing events held most years.

== In popular culture ==
Australian country musician Slim Dusty recorded a song written by David Kirkpatrick and Alex "Mack" Cormack entitled simply The Ballad of Camooweal which features this town.

== Climate ==
Climate data for Camooweal (Camooweal Township 1891–2024)
Month	Jan	Feb	Mar	Apr	May	Jun	Jul	Aug	Sep	Oct	Nov	Dec	Year
Record high °C (°F)	46.0 (114.8)	45.5 (113.9)	43.2 (109.8)	40.0 (104.0)	38.4 (101.1)	35.6 (96.1)	35.7 (96.3)	38.4 (101.1)	41.0 (105.8)	44.0 (111.2)	44.5 (112.1)	46.6 (115.9)	46.6 (115.9)
Mean daily maximum °C (°F)	37.4 (99.3)	36.3 (97.3)	35.4 (95.7)	33.1 (91.6)	29.0 (84.2)	26.0 (78.8)	25.9 (78.6)	28.5 (83.3)	32.5 (90.5)	35.9 (96.6)	37.6 (99.7)	38.2 (100.8)	33.0 (91.4)
Mean daily minimum °C (°F)	24.4 (75.9)	23.7 (74.7)	21.9 (71.4)	18.1 (64.6)	13.5 (56.3)	9.9 (49.8)	8.8 (47.8)	10.9 (51.6)	15.3 (59.5)	19.6 (67.3)	22.4 (72.3)	23.9 (75.0)	17.7 (63.9)
Record low °C (°F)	13.5 (56.3)	12.8 (55.0)	10.0 (50.0)	4.4 (39.9)	1.7 (35.1)	−2.2 (28.0)	−0.3 (31.5)	0.0 (32.0)	3.9 (39.0)	5.7 (42.3)	11.4 (52.5)	14.4 (57.9)	−2.2 (28.0)
Average rainfall mm (inches)	99.3 (3.91)	93.1 (3.67)	59.7 (2.35)	13.8 (0.54)	10.4 (0.41)	9.7 (0.38)	5.9 (0.23)	3.2 (0.13)	6.7 (0.26)	14.4 (0.57)	30.3 (1.19)	63.2 (2.49)	409.7 (16.13)
Average rainy days	8.7	8.3	5.6	1.6	1.3	1.1	0.9	0.5	1.2	2.7	4.5	6.4	42.8
Source: Australian Bureau of Meteorology
