= Tree of Knowledge, Camooweal =

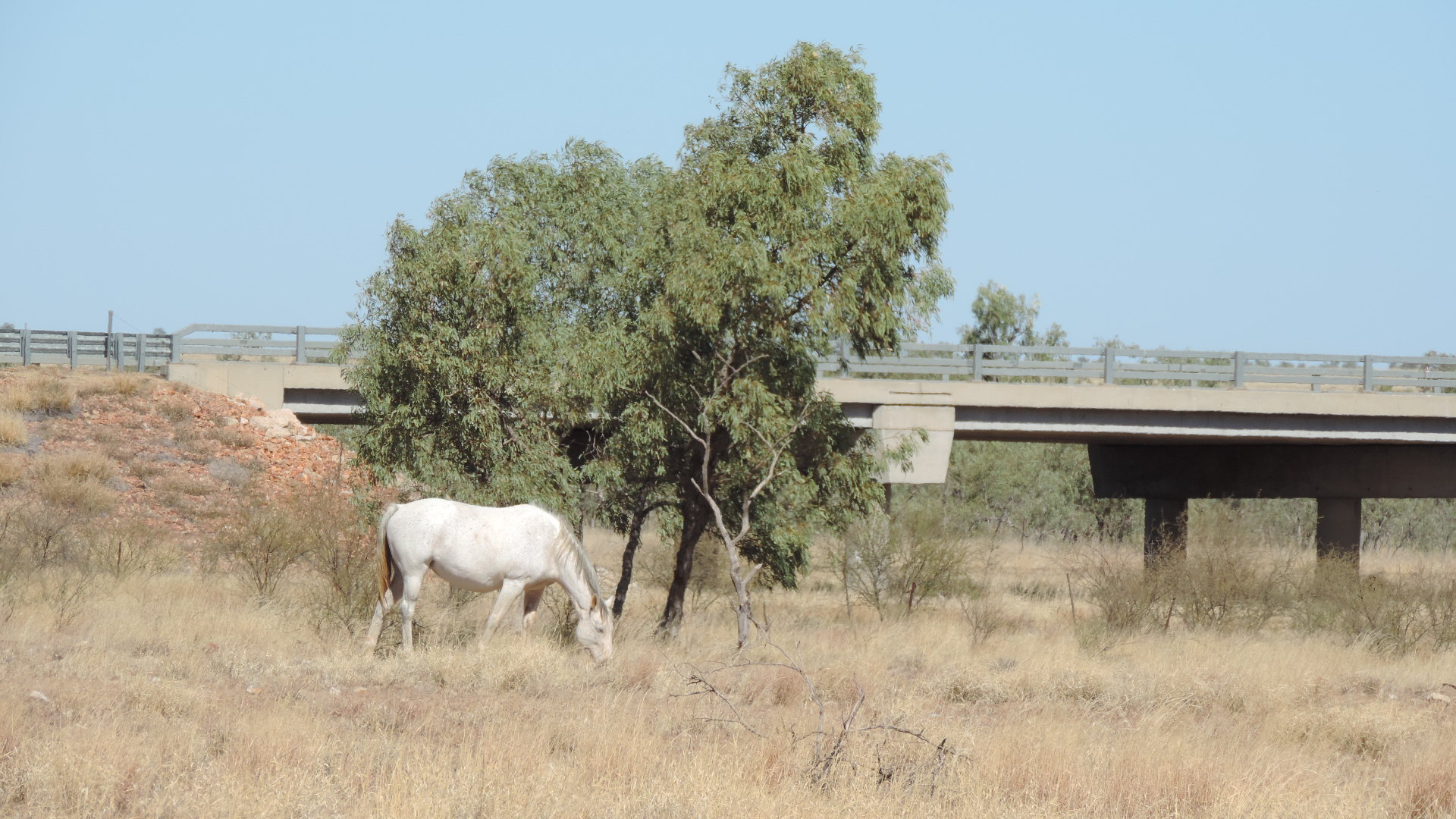
- Tree of Knowledge, 2019

- Location within Queensland Location within Australia
- 19.919°S 138.1139°E
- Location: Barkly Highway, Camooweal, City of Mount Isa, Queensland, Australia

Queensland Heritage Register
- Official name: Tree of Knowledge
- Type: state heritage (landscape)
- Designated: 8 September 2005
- Reference no.: 600738
- Significant period: 1890s–ongoing (historical, social)

Tree of Knowledge is a heritage-listed tree on the Barkly Highway, Camooweal, City of Mount Isa, Queensland, Australia. It was added to the Queensland Heritage Register on 8 September 2005.

== History ==
The Tree of Knowledge on the Camooweal Camping, Pasturage & Stock Dipping Reserve is a mature Coolibah tree, on the eastern side of the Georgina River and about 200 metres (660 ft) west of the town. It is said that for many years drovers and teamsters camped nearby and met and yarned beneath the shade of the tree.

Following William Landsborough's exploration of the Camooweal area during his search for Burke and Wills in 1861–62 pastoralists moved into the district. The first was John Sutherland who took up the Rocklands lease in 1865. Loss of stock to dingos combined with isolation, scarcity of labour and transport difficulties forced him to abandon his lease.

It was not until the mid-1870s that squatters moved back to the area. In 1883 local squatters petitioned the Queensland Government, requesting that land for a town to service their pastoral properties be reserved at the junction of the main stock route down the Georgina River from Burketown and a track from the east to Northern Territory (then part of South Australia). A town reserve of four square miles was gazetted on 15 December 1883 and was amended and re-gazetted in August 1884. The reserve was located on the Georgina River near Lake Frances, south of Rocklands Station Homestead. The first sections of the Town of Camooweal were surveyed in 1888.

By 1892 Camooweal had become an important outback township on major routes between Cloncurry and Burketown and between Cloncurry and pastoral properties further west. Being only seven miles from the border with South Australia it had a customs post, as well as post and telegraph facilities, courthouse and police station besides 2 hotels, a school and various service and supply businesses.

A pasturage reserve adjacent to the township was declared probably in the 1890s. In 1917 the reserve was increased from 7,697 acres to about 14,000 acres. This reserve stretched from the west of the town of Camooweal to the Northern Territory border and the rabbit proof fence and shared its northern and southern boundaries with Rocklands Station. In 1933 the reserve was designated for Pasturage purposes and in 1973 it was declared as a Camping, Pasturage & Stock dipping reserve. It is currently about 5,480 hectares in area.

The Barkly Highway passes through this reserve and drovers taking stock to and from the Northern Territory, up and down the Georgina stock route and up to Burketown used this reserve as a rest area. To teamsters and drovers, camping on the reserve near the Georgina River meant a chance to rest, clean clothes, water and feed their animals and utilise nearby Camooweal facilities such as shops, medical help and postal services. It was also an opportunity for teamsters and their families who used this route regularly, to send their children to the local school temporarily. Oral history collected from various drovers who used the reserve regularly, records that a particular Coolibah tree on the pasturage reserve, far enough from the river that it was safe from flash flooding and sheltered from the southerly prevailing winds, became a popular meeting place for drovers and teamsters, where they would sit in the shade and share tea and gossip - hence the name "Tree of Knowledge". The tree was located on the eastern side of the Georgina River, north of the bridge and within walking distance of town and offered attractive shade to those on the trade route from Burketown to Camooweal.

== Description ==
The Tree of Knowledge is a mature Coolibah tree (Eucalyptus microtheca) on the eastern side of the Georgina River, within walking distance of the town of Camooweal. It is located within 100 metres (330 ft) north of the new road bridge in the Camooweal Camping, Pasturage & Stock Dipping Reserve on the eastern flood plain of the Georgina River, 200 metres (660 ft) west of Camooweal. The tree is approximately 8 metres (26 ft) in height and its circumference a metre above the ground is 150 centimetres (59 in). There are scars around the base of the trunk and to a height of about 2.5 metres (8 ft 2 in).

== Heritage listing ==
Tree of Knowledge was listed on the Queensland Heritage Register on 8 September 2005 having satisfied the following criteria.

The place is important in demonstrating the evolution or pattern of Queensland's history.

The Tree of Knowledge on the Camooweal Camping, Pasturage & Stock Dipping reserve is important in demonstrating part of the pattern of Queensland's history. Before the advent of trucking, the reserve was used by drovers, teamsters and others visiting Camooweal as a place to camp, rest, collect mail and supplies and seek medical assistance at nearby Camooweal, before beginning the next stage of the journey. According to oral history, the Tree of Knowledge on the Camooweal reserve was a meeting place where the campers exchanged gossip.

The place has a strong or special association with a particular community or cultural group for social, cultural or spiritual reasons.

The tree has special association with drovers and their descendants and descendants of others involved in the pastoral industry. The Tree of Knowledge acts as a living, physical focal point for memories and reminiscences about their past and the role they and their families played in the development of the Barkly Tableland and surrounding area.
