= 2015 Gold Coast Suns season =

AFL season of the Gold Coast Suns

Gold Coast Suns
2015 season
- President: John Witheriff
- Coach: Rodney Eade (1st season)
- Captain: Gary Ablett, Jr. (5th season)
- Home ground: Metricon Stadium (Capacity: 25,000)

The Gold Coast Suns 2015 season was its fifth season in the Australian Football League (AFL).

== Club summary ==
The 2015 AFL season will be the 119th season of the VFL/AFL competition since its inception in 1897; having entered the competition in 2011, it will be the 5th season contested by the Gold Coast Football Club. Metricon Stadium will once again act as Gold Coast's primary home ground, hosting all of the club's eleven home games, and all of which will be played on Saturday. The club will play Adelaide, the Brisbane Lions, Greater Western Sydney, the Sydney Swans and West Coast Eagles twice during the regular season, and travel interstate nine times (three times to Melbourne and once each to Sydney, Canberra, Geelong, Launceston, Adelaide and Perth) in addition to also playing an away game against the Western Bulldogs in Cairns. After four consecutive meetings in Queensland, the Suns will play Richmond in Melbourne for the first time.

Major sponsors HostPlus and Fiat will continue as the club's two major sponsors, while BLK will manufacture the club's on-and-off field apparel for the next five seasons starting in 2015.

== Senior Personnel ==
Rodney Eade served as the club's head coach for the season, having replaced Guy McKenna who was sacked on 1 October 2014, while Gary Ablett, Jr. continued as the club's captain for the fifth consecutive season.

== 2015 player squad ==
Gold Coast Football Club
Senior list		Rookie List	Coaching staff
1 Jaeger O'Meara; 2 Zac Smith; 3 Tim Sumner; 4 Jack Martin; 5 Jarrod Harbrow; 6 Alex Sexton; 7 Nick Malceski; 8 Luke Russell; 9 Gary Ablett (c); 10 Dion Prestia; 11 Harley Bennell; 12 Sam Day; 13 Andrew Boston; 14 Mitch Hallahan; 15 Daniel Gorringe; 16 Rory Thompson; 17 Steven May; 18 Trent McKenzie; 19 Tom Lynch	20 Henry Schade; 21 Jack Leslie; 22 Tom Nicholls; 23 Charlie Dixon; 24 David Swallow; 25 Danny Stanley; 26 Matt Shaw; 27 Clay Cameron; 28 Kade Kolodjashnij; 30 Peter Wright; 32 Brandon Matera; 33 Aaron Hall; 35 Michael Rischitelli (vc); 37 Jesse Lonergan; 40 Sean Lemmens; 41 Jarrod Garlett; 42 Adam Saad; 44 Touk Miller; 48 Seb Tape	*31 Keegan Brooksby; 34 Josh Glenn; 36 Greg Broughton; 38 Tyrone Downie; 39 Louis Herbert; 43 Jarred Ellis; 46 Josh Hall	Head coach: Rodney Eade; Assistant coaches: Matthew Primus (midfield); Dean Solomon; Jeff White (ruck); Andy Lovell (development); Mark Riley; Brett Munro (opposition coach); Simon Fletcher (player development manager); Ashley Prescott (development coach); Josh Fraser (reserves coach); Legend: (c) Captain(s); (vc) Vice-captain(s); Long-term injury list; Upgraded rookie(s); (ret) Retired; Updated: 25 April 2015; Source(s): Playing list, Coaching staff

== Playing list changes ==
During the 2014 off-season, the Suns acquired the services of Sydney's Nick Malceski via the free agency system, while they also received Mitch Hallahan from the Hawthorn Football Club during the trade period in October. Foundation player Nathan Bock and Tom Murphy both retired last season, while Karmichael Hunt left the club to link with the Queensland Reds in the Super Rugby competition. In addition, Jackson Allen, Jack Hutchins, Jeremy Taylor, Matthew Warnock and Leigh Osborne were all delisted during the off-season.

The following summarises all player changes between the conclusion of the 2014 season and the commencement of the 2015 season.

=== In ===
Player	Previous club	League	via
Nick Malceski	Sydney Swans	AFL	Free agency
Mitch Hallahan	Hawthorn	AFL	AFL Trade Period
Peter Wright	Calder Cannons	TAC Cup	AFL Draft
Jarrod Garlett	South Fremantle Football Club	WAFL	AFL Draft
Touk Miller	Calder Cannons	TAC Cup	AFL Draft

=== Out ===
Player	New Club	League	via
Nathan Bock	Retirement	N/A	N/A
Tom Murphy	Retirement	N/A	N/A
Karmichael Hunt	Queensland Reds	Super Rugby	N/A
Jackson Allen	Delisted	N/A	N/A
Jack Hutchins	Delisted	N/A	N/A
Jeremy Taylor	Delisted	N/A	N/A
Matthew Warnock	Delisted	N/A	N/A
Leigh Osborne	Delisted	N/A	N/A

== Season summary ==
=== Pre-season matches ===
The club will play three practice matches as part of the 2015 NAB Challenge, and will be played under modified pre-season rules, including nine-point goals.

**Rd**	**Date and local time**	**Opponent**	**Scores** (Gold Coast's scores indicated in **bold**)			**Venue**	**Attendance**
**Rd**	**Date and local time**	**Opponent**	Home	Away	Result	**Venue**	**Attendance**
1	Sunday, 1 March (3:40 pm)	Geelong	**10.19 (79)**	1.9.8 (71)	Won by eight points	Tony Ireland Stadium, Townsville (H)	4,431
2	Saturday, 7 March (4:10 pm)	Greater Western Sydney	14.10 (94)	**2.6.4 (58)**	Lost by 36 points	Blacktown International Sportspark (A)	1,787
3	Friday, 20 March (7:40 pm)	Brisbane Lions	**0.8.15 (63)**	1.7.12 (63)	Match drawn	Metricon Stadium (H)	

=== Premiership Season ===
==== Home and away season ====
**Rd**	**Date and local time**	**Opponent**	**Scores** (Gold Coast's scores indicated in **bold**)			**Venue**	**Attendance**	**Ladder** **position**
**Rd**	**Date and local time**	**Opponent**	Home	Away	Result	**Venue**	**Attendance**	**Ladder** **position**
1	Saturday, 4 April (1:45 pm)	Melbourne	17.13 (115)	**13.11 (89)**	Lost by 26 points	Melbourne Cricket Ground (A)	27,013	15th
2	Saturday, 11 April (7:20 pm)	St Kilda	**10.16 (76)**	16.8 (104)	Lost by 28 points	Metricon Stadium (H)	13,649	14th
3	Sunday, 19 April (3:20 pm)	Geelong	16.9 (105)	**13.18 (96)**	Lost by 9 points	Simonds Stadium (A)	20,813	16th
4	Saturday, 25 April (5:40 pm)	Greater Western Sydney	16.23 (119)	**7.11 (53)**	Lost by 66 points	StarTrack Oval (A)	6,917	17th
5	Saturday, 2 May (4:35 pm)	Brisbane Lions	**18.10 (118)**	7.12 (54)	Won by 64 points	Metricon Stadium (H)	12,464	15th
6	Saturday, 9 May (5:10 pm)	Adelaide	**11.12 (78)**	18.11 (119)	Lost by 41 points	Metricon Stadium (H)	12,464	16th
7	Saturday, 16 May (5:40 pm)	West Coast	21.9 (135)	**6.7 (43)**	Lost by 92 points	Domain Stadium (A)	26,964	17th
8	Saturday, 23 May (4:35 pm)	Collingwood	**9.9 (63)**	20.12 (132)	Lost by 69 points	Metricon Stadium (H)	16,440	17th
9	Saturday, 30 May (1:45 pm)	Hawthorn	14.9 (93)	**6.4 (40)**	Lost by 53 points	Aurora Stadium (A)	11,320	17th
10	Saturday, 6 June (4:35 pm)	Sydney	**5.11 (41)**	13.15 (93)	Lost by 52 points	Metricon Stadium (H)	13,068	18th
11	Saturday, 13 June (1:40 pm)	Fremantle	**7.4 (46)**	6.17 (53)	Lost by 9 points	Metricon Stadium (H)	8,911	17th
12	Bye							
13	Sunday, 28 June (3:20 pm)	Carlton	14.19 (103)	9.15 (69)	Lost by 34 points	Etihad Stadium (A)	30,207	18th
14	Saturday, 4 July (4:35 pm)	North Melbourne	19.11 (125)	10.10 (70)	Won by 55 points	Metricon Stadium (H)	14,444	17th
15	Saturday, 11 July (4:35 pm)	Western Bulldogs				Cazaly's Stadium (A)		
16	Saturday, 18 July (2:10 pm)	Greater Western Sydney				Metricon Stadium (H)		
17	Saturday, 25 July (1:40 pm)	Adelaide				Adelaide Oval (A)		
18	Saturday, 1 August (7:20 pm)	West Coast				Metricon Stadium (H)		
19	Saturday, 8 August (4:35 pm)	Brisbane Lions				The Gabba (A)		
20	Sunday, 16 August (1:10 pm)	Richmond				Melbourne Cricket Ground (A)		
21	Saturday, 22 August (4:35 pm)	Essendon				Metricon Stadium (H)		
22	Saturday, 29 August (7:20 pm)	Port Adelaide				Metricon Stadium (H)		
23	TBC	Sydney				Sydney Cricket Ground (A)		

== Ladder ==
Pos	Team	Pld	W	L	D	PF	PA	PP	Pts	Qualification
1	Fremantle	22	17	5	0	1857	1564	118.7	68	Finals series
2	West Coast	22	16	5	1	2330	1572	148.2	66	Finals series
3	Hawthorn (P)	22	16	6	0	2452	1548	158.4	64	Finals series
4	Sydney	22	16	6	0	2006	1578	127.1	64	Finals series
5	Richmond	22	15	7	0	1930	1568	123.1	60	Finals series
6	Western Bulldogs	22	14	8	0	2101	1825	115.1	56	Finals series
7	Adelaide	21	13	8	0	2107	1821	115.7	54 (Note: The round 14 match between Adelaide and Geelong was cancelled due to the death of Adelaide coach Phil Walsh, and both teams were awarded two premiership points each.)	Finals series
8	North Melbourne	22	13	9	0	2062	1937	106.5	52	Finals series
9	Port Adelaide	22	12	10	0	2002	1874	106.8	48	
10	Geelong	21	11	9	1	1853	1833	101.1	48	
11	Greater Western Sydney	22	11	11	0	1872	1891	99.0	44	
12	Collingwood	22	10	12	0	1972	1856	106.3	40	
13	Melbourne	22	7	15	0	1573	2044	77.0	28	
14	St Kilda	22	6	15	1	1695	2162	78.4	26	
15	Essendon	22	6	16	0	1580	2134	74.0	24	
16	Gold Coast	22	4	17	1	1633	2240	72.9	18	
17	Brisbane Lions	22	4	18	0	1557	2306	67.5	16	
18	Carlton	22	4	18	0	1525	2354	64.8	16	

Rules for classification: 1) points; 2) percentage; 3) number of points for.
(P) Premiers

== Awards, Records & Milestones ==
=== Milestones ===
- Round 1:
  - Adam Saad – AFL debut
  - Touk Miller – AFL debut
  - Nick Malceski – first game for Gold Coast
- Round 2: Jarrod Harbrow – 150th AFL game
- Round 4: Charlie Dixon – 50th AFL game

== Brownlow Medal ==
=== Results ===
Round	1 vote	2 votes	3 votes
1			
2			
3			
4			
5			
6			
7			
8			
9			
10			
11			
12			
13			
14			
15			
16			
17			
18			
19			
20			
21			
22			
23			

=== Brownlow Medal tally ===
Player	1 vote games	2 vote games	3 vote games	Total votes
Total				

- italics denotes ineligible player

== Tribunal cases ==
Player	Round	Charge category	Verdict	Points^{[a]}	Result	Victim	Club	Ref(s)
Tom Lynch	Pre-season	Rough conduct	Guilty	N/A	One-match suspension	Matthew Buntine	Greater Western Sydney	
Matt Shaw	1	Engaging in rough conduct	Guilty	N/A	One-match suspension	Dean Kent	Melbourne	
Steven May	2	Rough conduct	Guilty	N/A	$1,000 fine	Jack Lonie	St Kilda	
Alex Sexton	2	Striking	Guilty	N/A	One-match suspension	Jack Lonie	St Kilda	
Steven May	5	Rough conduct	Guilty	N/A	Three-match suspension	Tom Rockliff	Brisbane Lions	

== Notes ==
- ^{a} "Points" refers to carry-over points accrued following the sanction. For example, 154.69 points draw a one-match suspension, with 54.69 carry-over points (for every 100 points, a one-match suspension is given).
