= 2013 Gold Coast Suns season =

Coordinates: 28°00′23″S 153°22′2″E

Gold Coast Suns
2013 season
- President: John Witheriff
- Coach: Guy McKenna
- Captain: Gary Ablett, Jr.
- Home ground: Metricon Stadium
- NAB Cup: 16th
- AFL season: 14th
- Best and Fairest: Gary Ablett, Jr.
- Leading goalkicker: Gary Ablett, Jr. (28 goals)
- Highest home attendance: 19,721

The 2013 AFL season was the Gold Coast Suns' third season in the Australian Football League (AFL). The Gold Coast Suns are based on the Gold Coast, Queensland, Australia. Their reserves team also competed in the NEAFL. The club was again captained by Gary Ablett, Jr. and coached by Guy McKenna.

== Draft picks ==
Round	Pick	Player	State/Nationality	Recruited From	League
National Draft
1	13	Jesse Lonergan	Tasmania	Launceston Blues	TFL
3	55	Tim Sumner	South Australia	Woodville-West Torrens Eagles	SANFL
3	57	Kyal Horsley	Western Australia	Rookie Promotion	
3	58	Clay Cameron	Queensland	Mount Gravatt Vultures	NEAFL
Rookie Draft
1	2	Leigh Osbourne	(Victoria (state)) Victoria	Frankston Dolphins	VFL
8	55	Andrew Boston	Queensland	Broadbeach Cats	NEAFL
Mini-Draft^{[a]}
1	1	Jack Martin	Western Australia	Claremont Tigers	WAFL

^{a} The mini-draft allowed teams to pre-list players for the following season.

== Transactions ==
=== Overview ===
Players Added

Via trade

- Greg Broughton

Via free agency

- Tom Murphy
Players Lost

Via trade

- Josh Caddy
- Tom Hickey

Via free agency
-

=== Trades ===
8 October 2012

To Greater Western Sydney Giants
- No. 2 Pick
- No. 63 Pick
- Compensation First Round Pick
To Gold Coast Suns
- Mini-Draft No. 1 Pick
- Compensation First Round Pick
10 October 2012

To Geelong Cats
- Josh Caddy
To Gold Coast Suns
- No. 55 Pick
- Compensation First Round Pick
23 October 2012

To St Kilda Saints
- Tom Hickey
To Gold Coast Suns
- No. 13 Pick
- No. 37 Pick
- No. 57 Pick
25 October 2012

To Fremantle Dockers
- No. 37 Pick
To Gold Coast Suns
- Greg Broughton
- No. 60 Pick

=== Free Agents ===
==== Additions ====
Player	Signed	Former Team
Tom Murphy	Signed 2 Year Contract	Hawthorn Hawks

== Re-signings ==
Re-signings made in 2012.

Player	Signed	Year Contract Runs To
Charlie Dixon	3 Year Extension	2015
Harley Bennell	2 Year Extension	2014
Sam Day	2 Year Extension	2014
Karmichael Hunt	2 Year Extension	2014
Tom Lynch	2 Year Extension	2014
Brandon Matera	2 Year Extension	2014
Steven May	2 Year Extension	2014
Danny Stanley	2 Year Extension	2014
David Swallow	2 Year Extension	2014
Jeremy Taylor	2 Year Extension	2014
Luke Russell	2 Year Extension	2014
Matthew Warnock	2 Year Extension	2014
Jacob Gilbee	1 Year Extension	2013
Tom Hickey	1 Year Extension	2013
Jack Hutchins	1 Year Extension	2013
Tom Nicholls	1 Year Extension	2013
Liam Patrick	1 Year Extension	2013
Alex Sexton	1 Year Extension	2014
Maverick Weller	1 Year Extension	2013
Joel Wilkinson	1 Year Extension	2013

== Delistings ==
Delistings made in November 2012

Player	Age	Seasons	Games
Sam Iles	25	2	26
Josh Fraser	30	2	18
Nathan Krakouer	24	1	13
Josh Toy	20	2	13
Taylor Hine	20	2	9
Alik Magin	21	2	8
Michael Coad	29	2	6
Hayden Jolly	20	2	6
Andrew McQualter	26	1	5
Piers Flanagan	20	2	3
Lewis Moss	20	2	0

= Retired

== Contract Lengths ==
Contract lengths at the beginning of 2013.

Player	2013	2014	2015	Source
Gary Ablett Jr	Gold Coast Suns			
Charlie Dixon	Gold Coast Suns			
Harley Bennell	Gold Coast Suns			
Clay Cameron	Gold Coast Suns			
Sam Day	Gold Coast Suns			
Karmichael Hunt	Gold Coast Suns			
Jesse Lonergan	Gold Coast Suns			
Tom Lynch	Gold Coast Suns			
Brandon Matera	Gold Coast Suns			
Steven May	Gold Coast Suns			
Tom Murphy	Gold Coast Suns			
Jaeger O'Meara	Gold Coast Suns			
Luke Russell	Gold Coast Suns			
Alex Sexton	Gold Coast Suns			
Danny Stanley	Gold Coast Suns			
Tim Sumner	Gold Coast Suns			
David Swallow	Gold Coast Suns			
Jeremy Taylor	Gold Coast Suns			
Matthew Warnock	Gold Coast Suns			
Jackson Allen	Gold Coast Suns			
Nathan Bock	Gold Coast Suns			
Andrew Boston	Gold Coast Suns			
Jared Brennan	Gold Coast Suns			
Greg Broughton	Gold Coast Suns			
Campbell Brown	Gold Coast Suns			
Jacob Gillbee	Gold Coast Suns			
Daniel Gorringe	Gold Coast Suns			
Aaron Hall	Gold Coast Suns			
Josh Hall	Gold Coast Suns			
Jarrod Harbrow	Gold Coast Suns			
Kyal Horsley	Gold Coast Suns			
Jack Hutchins	Gold Coast Suns			
Trent McKenzie	Gold Coast Suns			
Tom Nicholls	Gold Coast Suns			
Leigh Osbourne	Gold Coast Suns			
Liam Patrick	Gold Coast Suns			
Dion Prestia	Gold Coast Suns			
Michael Rischitelli	Gold Coast Suns			
Henry Schade	Gold Coast Suns			
Matt Shaw	Gold Coast Suns			
Zac Smith	Gold Coast Suns			
Seb Tape	Gold Coast Suns			
Rory Thompson	Gold Coast Suns			
Maverick Weller	Gold Coast Suns			
Joel Wilkinson	Gold Coast Suns			

== 2013 Playing List ==
Senior list
No.	Born	Player	Hgt	Wgt	Date of birth	Age in 2013	Debut	Recruited from	2013 Games	2013 Goals	Career Games	Career Goals
1	(Western Australia)	Jaeger O'Meara	182	75	23 February 1994	19	2013	Perth Demons
2	(Queensland)	Zac Smith	205	97	22 February 1990	23	2011	Southport Sharks
3	(Northern Territory)	Jared Brennan	195	95	28 July 1984	29	2003	Brisbane Lions
4	(Tasmania)	Maverick Weller	182	79	13 February 1992	21	2011	Burnie Dockers
5	(Queensland)	Jarrod Harbrow	178	74	18 July 1988	25	2007	Western Bulldogs
6	(Queensland)	Alex Sexton	185	71	3 December 1993	20	2012	Redland Bombers
7	(Queensland)	Karmichael Hunt	186	92	17 November 1986	27	2011
8	(Tasmania)	Luke Russell	186	78	24 January 1992	21	2011	Burnie Dockers
9	(Victoria (state))	Gary Ablett, Jr.	182	85	14 May 1984	29	2002	Geelong Cats
10	(Victoria (state))	Dion Prestia	175	82	12 October 1992	21	2011	Calder Cannons
11	(Western Australia)	Harley Bennell	185	74	2 October 1992	21	2011	Peel Thunder
12	(South Australia)	Sam Day	196	96	6 September 1992	21	2011	Sturt Blues
13	(Tasmania)	Jacob Gillbee	184	76	13 September 1992	21	2011	Lauderdale Bombers
14	(Victoria (state))	Matthew Warnock	194	95	3 April 1984	29	2006	Melbourne Demons
15	(South Australia)	Daniel Gorringe	200	88	2 June 1992	21	2011	Norwood Redlegs
16	(Queensland)	Rory Thompson	200	91	12 March 1991	22	2011	Southport Sharks
17	(Northern Territory)	Steven May	190	93	10 January 1992	21	2011	Melbourne Grammar School
18	(Victoria (state))	Trent McKenzie	191	82	3 April 1992	21	2011	Western Jets
19	(Victoria (state))	Thomas Lynch	199	91	31 October 1992	21	2011	Dandenong Stingrays
20	(Tasmania)	Henry Schade	196	81	8 August 1993	20	****	North Hobart Demons
21	(Victoria (state))	Jeremy Taylor	191	83	17 June 1992	21	2011	Geelong Falcons
22	(Victoria (state))	Tom Nicholls	201	93	4 March 1992	21	2011	Sandringham Dragons
23	(Queensland)	Charlie Dixon	202	107	23 September 1990	23	2011	Redland Bombers
24	(Western Australia)	David Swallow	186	83	19 November 1992	21	2011	East Fremantle Sharks
25	(Victoria (state))	Daniel Stanley	187	88	18 February 1988	25	2007	Collingwood Magpies
26	(Victoria (state))	Matt Shaw	187	71	5 February 1992	21	2011	Dandenong Stingrays
27	(Queensland)	Clay Cameron	190	84	27 May 1994	19	****	Mount Gravatt Vultures
29	(Victoria (state))	Tom Murphy	190	89	19 March 1986	27	2005	Hawthorn Hawks
30	(Western Australia)	Campbell Brown	179	81.5	29 August 1983	29	2002	Hawthorn Hawks
31	(Queensland)	Jackson Allen	179	75	14 April 1993	20	2012	Morningside Panthers
32	(Western Australia)	Brandon Matera	175	65	11 March 1992	21	2011	South Fremantle Bulldogs
33	(Tasmania)	Aaron Hall	186	78	9 November 1990	23	2012	Hobart Tigers
34	(Victoria (state))	Jack Hutchins	191	92	20 February 1992	21	2011	Sandringham Dragons
35	(Victoria (state))	Michael Rischitelli	184	81.6	8 January 1986	27	2004	Brisbane Lions
36	(Western Australia)	Greg Broughton	189	82	29 September 1986	27	2009	Fremantle Dockers
37	(Tasmania)	Jesse Lonergan	183	89	14 November 1994	19	****	Launceston Blues
38	(Queensland)	Joel Wilkinson	186	81	29 November 1991	22	2011	Broadbeach Cats
39	(South Australia)	Tim Sumner	187	86	9 October 1994	19	****	Woodville-West Torrens Eagles
42	(Western Australia)	Kyal Horsley	182	88	2 September 1987	26	2012	Subiaco Lions
43	(Northern Territory)	Liam Patrick	189	71.9	4 March 1988	25	2011	Wanderers Eagles
44	(South Australia)	Nathan Bock	193	93	20 March 1983	30	2004	Adelaide Crows
48	(Victoria (state))	Seb Tape	191	81	6 August 1992	21	2011	Glenelg Tigers
Rookie list
No.	Born	Player	Hgt	Wgt	Date of birth	Age in 2012	Debut	Recruited from	2012 Games	2012 Goals	Career Games	Career Goals
40	(Queensland)	Andrew Boston	180	79	23 March 1994	19	****	Broadbeach Cats
41	(Victoria (state))	Leigh Osborne	182	81	13 March 1990	23	****	Frankston Dolphins
46	(Queensland)	Josh Hall	197	84	3 April 1990	23	2012	Curra Swans

== 2013 Coaches Panel ==
State	Coach	Coaching position	Started	Former clubs as coach
Western Australia	Guy McKenna	Senior Coach	2009	Claremont (s), West Coast (a), Collingwood (a)
Queensland	Marcus Ashcroft	GM of Coaching and Development	2011	Gold Coast (a)
South Australia	Malcolm Blight	Coaching Advisor	2009	North Melbourne (s), Woodville (s), Geelong (s), Adelaide (s), St Kilda (s)
Tasmania	Andy Lovell	Assistant coach	-	Glenorchy (s)
South Australia	Matthew Primus	Assistant coach (Midfield)	2013	Port Adelaide (a), Port Adelaide (s)
Western Australia	Mark Riley	Assistant coach (Forwards)	2013	Claremont (s), Fremantle (a), Melbourne (a), Melbourne (s)
New South Wales	Dean Solomon	Assistant coach	2011	-
(Victoria (state)) Victoria	Brett Munro	Opposition Coach	2012	-
(Victoria (state)) Victoria	Ben Mathews	Development coach	2013	-
(Victoria (state)) Victoria	Andrew Johnston	Development coach	2010	-
(Victoria (state)) Victoria	Shaun Hart	Reserves Coach	2009	Gold Coast (a)

== Guernsey ==
Home	Away	Clash

- Home Guernsey - The Gold Coast Football Club continued to use the same home guernsey they did in 2011 and 2012.
- Away Guernsey - The Gold Coast Football Club continued to use the same away guernsey they did in 2011 and 2012.
- Clash Guernsey - The new clash guernsey was revealed in February 2013 and was worn for the first time in the Gold Coast's second pre-season game against the Brisbane Lions.

== Pre-season results ==
2013 pre-season games: 2-3 (Home: 2-2; Away: 0–1)
Game	Time; Date	Team	Score	Most Goals	Most Disposals	Venue; Attendance	Record
1	6:40pm 23 February	Hawthorn	W 30–29	Harley Bennell (2)	Gary Ablett Jr (13)	Metricon Stadium; 7,847	1–0
2	8:50pm 23 February	Brisbane	L 24–57	Jared Brennan (1); Campbell Brown (1) etc.	Harley Bennell (8); Jesse Lonergan (8) etc.	Metricon Stadium; 7,847	1–1
3	3:30pm 2 March	North Melbourne	L 89–102	Campbell Brown (2); David Swallow (2)	David Swallow (20)	Tony Ireland Stadium; 7,216	1–2
4	7:00pm 9 March	Sydney	L 44–80	Harley Bennell (2); Campbell Brown (2)	Harley Bennell (24); Jaeger O'Meara (24)	Blacktown Olympic Park -	1–3
5	11:30am 16 March	Melbourne	W 80–55	Aaron Hall (3)	Gary Ablett Jr (24)	Fankhauser Reserve -	2–3
2013 NAB Cup Schedule

== Home and Away season ==
=== Season summary ===
Overall								Home			Away		
Pld	W	D	L	PF	PA	%	Pts	W	D	L	W	D	L
10	4	0	6	893	948	94.20	16	2	0	3	2	0	3

=== Games ===
2013 home and away games: 3-4 (Home: 1–3; Away: 2–1)
Round	Time; Date	Team	Score	Most Goals	Most Disposals	Venue; Attendance	Record
1	6:40pm 30 March	St Kilda	W 90–77	Gary Ablett Jr (4)	Gary Ablett Jr (34)	Metricon Stadium; 13,832	1–0
2	1:45pm 6 April	Sydney	L 73–113	Charlie Dixon (3)	Jaeger O'Meara (25)	Sydney Cricket Ground; 20,372	1–1
3	7:40pm 13 April	Brisbane	L 92–94	Harley Bennell (3)	Jared Brennan (30)	Metricon Stadium; 12,961	1–2
4	7:40pm 20 April	Port Adelaide	L 66–104	Rory Thompson (2)	Gary Ablett Jr (35)	Metricon Stadium; 11,322	1–3
5	1:40pm 27 April	Greater Western Sydney	W 148–104	Charlie Dixon (6)	Gary Ablett Jr (32)	Manuka Oval; 6,832	2–3
6	7:40pm 4 May	Fremantle	L 54–99	Jaeger O'Meara (2)	Jarrod Harbrow (32)	Metricon Stadium; 10,552	2–4
7	4:40pm 12 May	Melbourne	W 114–54	Campbell Brown (2); Zac Smith (2)	Gary Ablett Jr (38)	MCG; 13,304	3–4
8	4:40pm 18 May	Western Bulldogs	W 93–61	Campbell Brown (3)	Gary Ablett Jr (31)	Metricon Stadium; 13,520	4–4
9	1:10pm 26 May	Hawthorn	L 92–118	Aaron Hall (5)	Gary Ablett Jr (37)	MCG; 28,112	4–5
10	7:40pm 1 June	Geelong	L 71–123	Campbell Brown (3)	Gary Ablett Jr (34)	Simonds Stadium; 30,082	4–6
11	7:40pm 8 June	North Melbourne	W 66–51	Gary Ablett Jr (2); Tom Lynch (2); Luke Russell (2)	Gary Ablett Jr (33)	Metricon Stadium; 10,891	5–6
12	7:40pm 15 June	Essendon	L 72–115	Campbell Brown (2); Michael Rischitelli (2); Tom Nicholls (2)	Gary Ablett Jr (36)	Etihad Stadium; 31,452	5–7
13	Bye
14	1:40pm 29 June	Adelaide	L 83–111	Dion Prestia (2)	Dion Prestia (42)	Metricon Stadium; 13,791	5–8
15	4:40pm 6 July	Brisbane	L 83–116	Jared Brennan (3)	Harley Bennell (28)	Gabba; 27,170	5–9
16	4:40pm 13 July	Richmond	L 44–53	(-)	Dion Prestia (27)	Cazaly's Stadium; 11,197	5–10
17	4:40pm 20 July	Collingwood	W 85–78	Jaeger O'Meara (3); Jared Brennan (3)	Gary Ablett Jr (49)	Metricon Stadium; 19,721	6–10
18	1:45pm 27 July	Carlton	L 77–120	(-)	Gary Ablett Jr (34)	Metricon Stadium; 19,460	6–11
19	2:40pm 3 August	West Coast	L 113–130	Alex Sexton (3)	Dion Prestia (28)	Subiaco Oval; 32,140	6–12
20	7:40pm 10 August	Melbourne	W 90–77	Campbell Brown (3)	David Swallow (28)	Metricon Stadium; 13,840	7–12
21	1:40pm 17 August	Port Adelaide	L 96–113	Harley Bennell (3); Andrew Boston (3)	Harley Bennell (28)	AAMI Stadium; 18,703	7–13
22	1:10pm 25 August	St Kilda	L 70–116	Timmy Sumner (3)	Gary Ablett Jr (28)	Etihad Stadium; 17,662	7–13
23	1:10prm 1 September	Greater Western Sydney	W 146–63	Gary Ablett Jr (4); Andrew Boston (4)	Gary Ablett Jr (33); Dion Prestia (33)	Metricon Stadium; 13,080	8–14
2013 AFL Season Schedule

== Ladder ==
2013 AFL ladder
Pos	Team	Pld	W	L	D	PF	PA	PP	Pts	
1	Hawthorn (P)	22	19	3	0	2523	1859	135.7	76	Finals series
2	Geelong	22	18	4	0	2409	1776	135.6	72	Finals series
3	Fremantle	22	16	5	1	2035	1518	134.1	66	Finals series
4	Sydney	22	15	6	1	2244	1694	132.5	62	Finals series
5	Richmond	22	15	7	0	2154	1754	122.8	60	Finals series
6	Collingwood	22	14	8	0	2148	1868	115.0	56	Finals series
7	Port Adelaide	22	12	10	0	2051	2002	102.4	48	Finals series
8	Carlton	22	11	11	0	2125	1992	106.7	44	Finals series
9	Essendon	22	14	8	0	2145	2000	107.3	56 (Note: Essendon was relegated to ninth due to irregularities in its supplements program during the 2012 season.)	
10	North Melbourne	22	10	12	0	2307	1930	119.5	40	
11	Adelaide	22	10	12	0	2064	1909	108.1	40	
12	Brisbane Lions	22	10	12	0	1922	2144	89.6	40	
13	West Coast	22	9	13	0	2038	2139	95.3	36	
14	Gold Coast	22	8	14	0	1918	2091	91.7	32	
15	Western Bulldogs	22	8	14	0	1926	2262	85.1	32	
16	St Kilda	22	5	17	0	1751	2120	82.6	20	
17	Melbourne	22	2	20	0	1455	2691	54.1	8	
18	Greater Western Sydney	22	1	21	0	1524	2990	51.0	4	

Source: AFL Tables
Rules for classification: 1) points; 2) percentage; 3) number of points for.
(P) Premiers

=== Ladder progress ===
Round	1	2	3	4	5	6	7	8	9	10	11	12	13	14	15	16	17	18	19	20	21	22	23
Ground	H	A	H	H	A	H	A	H	A	A	H	A	-	H	A	A	H	H	A	H	A	A	H
Result	W	L	L	L	W	L	W	W	L	L	W	L	B	-	-	-	-	-	-	-	-	-	-
Position	7	11	13	14	11	13	13	12	12	13	12	12	-	-	-	-	-	-	-	-	-	-	-

Source: Competitive Matches
A = Away; H = Home; B = Bye; W = Win; D = Draw; L = Lose

== Season statistics ==
=== Home attendance ===
Round	Opponent	Attendance
1	St Kilda	13,832
3	Brisbane Lions	12,961
4	Port Adelaide	11,322
6	Fremantle	10,552
8	Western Bulldogs	13,520
11	North Melbourne	10,891
14	Adelaide	-
17	Collingwood	-
18	Carlton	-
20	Melbourne	-
23	Greater Western Sydney	-
Total attendance		73,078
Average Attendance		12,180

=== Top 5 Goal Scorers ===
No.	Player	Games	Season Goals
1	Charlie Dixon	5	11
2	Gary Ablett Jr	5	7
3	Aaron Hall	5	5
3	Brandon Matera	5	5
5	Zac Smith	5	5
Average Goals per game			13.40

== Awards ==
=== Brownlow Medal ===
Votes	Player
-	-

=== Gold Coast Club Champion ===
Votes	Player
-	-

=== Other Awards ===
Award Name	Player
Ironman Award	-
Community Award	-
Most Professional	-
Most Improved	-
Reserves Best	-

== Representative honours ==
=== Indigenous All-Stars Game ===
==== Indigenous All-Stars ====
Player	Games
Harley Bennell	1
Jarrod Harbrow	1
Steven May	1

=== International Rules ===
==== Australia ====
Player	Games
Jarrod Harbrow	2

== NEAFL season ==
=== Results ===
Gold Coast's NEAFL practice matches
Week	Date and local time	Opponent	Scores (Gold Coast's scores indicated in bold)			Venue
Week	Date and local time	Opponent	Home	Away	Result	Venue
1	Saturday, 2 March (1:30 pm)	Aspley	**7.11 (53)**	4.4 (28)	Won by 25 points	Carrara Stadium **[H]**
2	Saturday, 9 March (2:30 pm)	Broadbeach	**18.7 (115)**	12.12 (84)	Won by 31 points	Carrara Stadium **[H]**
3	Saturday, 16 March (2:30 pm)	Brisbane (res)	14.6 (90)	**22.8 (140)**	Lost by 50 points	Carrara Stadium **[H]**

**Round**	**Date and local time**	**Opponent**	**Scores** (Gold Coast's scores indicated in **bold**)			**Venue**	**Ladder** **position**
**Round**	**Date and local time**	**Opponent**	Home	Away	Result	**Venue**	**Ladder** **position**
1	Bye						-
2	Saturday, 30 March (3:00 pm)	Mount Gravatt	**24.14 (158)**	4.6 (32)	Won by 126 points	Carrara Stadium **[H]**	2nd
3	Saturday, 6 April (10:05 am)	Sydney (res)	15.20 (110)	**10.5 (65)**	Lost by 45 points	Sydney Cricket Ground **[A]**	4th
4	Saturday, 13 April (4:00 pm)	Brisbane (res)	**10.10 (70)**	28.12 (180)	Lost by 110 points	Carrara Stadium **[H]**	7th
5	Saturday, 20 April (1:30 pm)	Redland	12.13 (85)	**22.19 (151)**	Won by 66 points	Victoria Point **[A]**	5th
6	Thursday, 25 April (12:00 pm)	Brisbane (res)	**12.7 (79)**	17.9 (111)	Lost by 32 points	Harrup Park **[H]**	6th
7	Saturday, 4 May (4:00 pm)	Southport	**16.10 (106)**	11.11 (77)	Won by 29 points	Carrara Stadium **[H]**	6th
8	Bye						-
9	Saturday, 18 May (12:00 pm)	Morningside	5.10 (40)	**17.17 (119)**	Won by 79 points	Esplen Oval **[A]**	6th
10	Saturday, 25 May (10:00 am)	GWS (res)	14.7 (91)	**18.12 (120)**	Won by 29 points	Blacktown Olympic Park **[A]**	4th
11	Saturday, 1 June (1:30 pm)	Brisbane (res)	10.10 (70)	**17.15 (117)**	Won by 47 points	Giffin Park **[A]**	4th
12	Saturday, 8 June (3:00 pm)	Sydney (res)				Carrara Stadium **[H]**	-
13	Sunday, 16 June (9:30 am)	GWS (res)				Skoda Stadium **[A]**	-
14	Bye						-
15	Saturday, 29 June (7:00 pm)	Northern Territory				TIO Stadium **[A]**	-
16	Saturday, 6 July (12:00 pm)	Brisbane (res)				Giffin Park **[A]**	-
17	Saturday, 13 July (1:30 pm)	Aspley				Graham Rd Oval **[A]**	-
18	Saturday, 20 July (1:30 pm)	Sydney (res)				Carrara Stadium **[H]**	-
19	Saturday, 27 July (10:05 am)	GWS (res)				Carrara Stadium **[H]**	-
20	Bye						-
21	Saturday, 10 August (4:00 pm)	Labrador				Carrara Stadium **[H]**	-
22	Saturday, 17 August (1:30 pm)	Broadbeach				H & A Oval **[A]**	-
2013 NEAFL Season Schedule

=== NEAFL Ladder ===
NEAFL North Conference	Wins	Byes	Losses	Draws	For	Against	%	Pts
**Brisbane Lions res.**	16	0	2	0	2165	1308	165.52%	64
**Southport Sharks**	14	0	4	0	1934	1362	142.00%	56
**Aspley Hornets**	12	0	5	1	1960	1467	133.61%	50
**Morningside Panthers**	11	0	7	0	1825	1508	121.02%	44
**Redland Bombers**	11	0	7	0	1862	1656	112.44%	44
Gold Coast Suns res.	10	0	7	1	1850	1658	111.58%	42
NT Thunder	9	0	9	0	2008	1809	111.00%	36
Broadbeach Cats	7	0	11	0	1540	1776	86.71%	28
Mount Gravatt Vultures	1	0	17	0	1126	2259	49.85%	4
Labrador Tigers	1	0	17	0	1112	2316	48.01%	4

FINALS

Final	Team	G	B	Pts	Team	G	B	Pts
Elimination	Redland	13	11	89	Morningside	11	18	84
Qualifying	Aspley	17	16	118	Southport	10	14	74
1st Semi	Southport	16	13	109	Redland	11	12	78
2nd Semi	Brisbane Lions Reserves	16	10	106	Aspley	15	14	104
Preliminary	Aspley	20	15	135	Southport	8	21	69
Grand	Brisbane Lions Reserves	19	11	125	Aspley	11	13	79
