= 2017 Gold Coast Suns season =

Australian rules football club season

The 2017 Gold Coast Football Club season was the Gold Coast Suns' seventh season in the Australian Football League. They also fielded a reserves team in the NEAFL.

== AFL ==
=== List changes ===
==== Retirements and delistings ====
**Player**	**Date**	**Reason**	**Career games**	**Career goals**	**Ref.**
Tom Keough	1 September 2016	Delisted	0	0	
Luke Russell	1 September 2016	Delisted	73	29	
Danny Stanley	1 September 2016	Delisted	88	39	
Seb Tape	1 September 2016	Delisted	40	1	
Nick Malceski	27 October 2016	Retired	210	75	
Keegan Brooksby	28 October 2016	Delisted	14	3	
Clay Cameron	28 October 2016	Delisted	23	5	
Cameron Loersch	28 October 2016	Delisted	0	0	
Henry Schade	28 October 2016	Delisted	20	0	
Jarrod Garlett	8 November 2016	Delisted	17	10	

==== Trades ====
**Date**	**Gained**	**From**	**Lost**	**Ref.**
18 October 2016	Pearce Hanley	Brisbane Lions	Pick 22	
18 October 2016	Pick 67	Port Adelaide	Pick 30	
19 October 2016	Pick 6; 2017 second round pick (Richmond)	Richmond	Dion Prestia; Pick 24	
20 October 2016	Jarrod Witts	Collingwood	Pick 44; Pick 62	
20 October 2016	Pick 35; Pick 43	Western Bulldogs	Pick 26; Pick 80	
20 October 2016	Jarryd Lyons; Pick 71	Adelaide	Pick 43; Pick 67	
20 October 2016	Pick 73; 2017 second round pick (Fremantle)	Fremantle	Pick 35; Pick 71; 2017 fourth round pick (Gold Coast)	
20 October 2016	Pick 10; 2017 second round pick (Hawthorn)	Hawthorn	Jaeger O'Meara	

==== Free Agency ====
===== In =====
**Player**	**Date**	**Free agent type**	**Former club**	**Compensation**	**Ref.**
Michael Barlow	8 November 2016	Delisted	Fremantle	N/A	

==== National draft ====
**Round**	**Pick**	**Player**	**Recruited from**	**League**	**Ref.**
1	4	Ben Ainsworth	Gippsland Power	TAC Cup	
1	7	Jack Scrimshaw	Sandringham Dragons	TAC Cup	
1	9	Will Brodie	Murray Bushrangers	TAC Cup	
1	10	Jack Bowes	Cairns	AFL Cairns	
4	67	Brad Scheer	Palm Beach Currumbin	QAFL	
Rookie elevation		Jesse Joyce	Gold Coast	AFL	

==== Rookie draft ====
**Round**	**Pick**	**Player**	**Recruited from**	**League**	**Ref.**
1	4	Keegan Brooksby	Gold Coast	AFL	
2	22	Cameron Loersch	Gold Coast	AFL	
Category B		Max Spencer	Palm Beach Currumbin	QAFL	

=== Squad ===
Gold Coast Football Club
Senior list		Rookie list	Coaching staff
1 Jaeger O'Meara; 2 Jarrad Grant; 3 Matt Rosa; 4 Jack Martin; 5 Jarrod Harbrow; 6 Alex Sexton; 7 Nick Malceski; 8 Luke Russell; 9 Gary Ablett **(c)**; 10 Dion Prestia; 11 Touk Miller; 12 Sam Day; 13 Callum Ah Chee; 14 Mitch Hallahan; 15 Daniel Currie; 16 Rory Thompson; 17 Steven May; 18 Trent McKenzie; 19 Tom Lynch; 20 Henry Schade	21 Jack Leslie; 22 Tom Nicholls; 23 Sean Lemmens; 24 David Swallow; 26 Matt Shaw; 27 Clay Cameron; 28 Kade Kolodjashnij; 29 Brayden Fiorini; 30 Peter Wright; 31 Keegan Brooksby; 32 Brandon Matera; 33 Aaron Hall; 34 Mackenzie Willis; 35 Michael Rischitelli **(vc)**; 36 Josh Schoenfeld; 37 Jesse Lonergan; 41 Jarrod Garlett; 42 Adam Saad; 48 Seb Tape	25 Danny Stanley; 38 Jesse Joyce; 39 Ryan Davis; 40 Tom Keough; 44 Darcy Macpherson; 46 Cameron Loersch	**Head coach**: Rodney Eade; **Assistant coaches**: Matthew Primus (midfield); Dean Solomon (defence); Andy Lovell (midfield); Ashley Prescott (forward); Matthew Lappin (head of development); Max Rooke (development); Brett Munro (opposition coach); Stephen Daniel (NEAFL coach); Legend: (c) Captain(s); (vc) Vice-captain(s); Long-term injury list; Upgraded rookie(s); Updated: 25 August 2016; Source(s): Playing list, Coaching staff

=== Season summary ===
==== Pre-season ====
**Rd**	**Date and local time**	**Opponent**	**Scores** (Gold Coast's scores indicated in **bold**)			**Venue**	**Attendance**	**Ref**
**Rd**	**Date and local time**	**Opponent**	Home	Away	Result	**Venue**	**Attendance**	**Ref**
1	Sunday, 19 February (3:40 pm)	Brisbane Lions	**0.11.15 (81)**	1.7.6 (57)	Won by 24 points	Kombumerri Park, Merrimac (H)	2,174	
2	Sunday, 26 February (3:40 pm)	Essendon	**0.12.7 (79)**	0.12.4 (76)	Won by 3 points	Harrup Park Country Club (H)	3,893	
3	Thursday, 9 March (4:50 pm)	Western Bulldogs	**0.16.9 (105)**	4.13.12 (126)	Lost by 21 points	Metricon Stadium (H)	3,007	

==== Home and Away season ====
**Rd**	**Date and local time**	**Opponent**	**Scores** (Gold Coast's scores indicated in **bold**)			**Venue**	**Attendance**	**Ref**
**Rd**	**Date and local time**	**Opponent**	Home	Away	Result	**Venue**	**Attendance**	**Ref**
1	Saturday, 25 March (7:05 pm)	Brisbane Lions	**14.12 (96)**	15.8 (98)	Lost by 2 points	Metricon Stadium (H)	12,710	
2	Saturday, 1 April (4:35 pm)	Greater Western Sydney	24.16 (160)	**8.10 (58)**	Lost by 102 points	Spotless Stadium (A)	8,022	
3	Sunday, 9 April (4:40 pm)	Hawthorn	**21.13 (139)**	7.11 (53)	Won by 86 points	Metricon Stadium (H)	14,728	
4	Saturday, 15 April (7:25 pm)	Carlton	12.10 (82)	**17.6 (108)**	Won by 26 points	Etihad Stadium (A)	24,968	
5	Saturday, 22 April (4:35 pm)	Adelaide	**13.8 (86)**	23.15 (153)	Lost by 67 points	Metricon Stadium (H)	12,672	
6	Saturday, 29 April (7:25 pm)	North Melbourne	16.11 (107)	**14.10 (94)**	Lost by 13 points	Etihad Stadium (A)	15,431	
7	Saturday, 6 May (7:25 pm)	Geelong	**18.16 (124)**	15.9 (99)	Won by 25 points	Metricon Stadium (H)	13,648	
8	Sunday, 14 May (1:15 pm)	Port Adelaide	**4.14 (38)**	16.14 (110)	Lost by 72 points	Jiangwan Stadium, Shanghai (H)	10,118	
9	Bye							
10	Saturday, 27 May (4:05 pm)	Melbourne	18.14 (122)	**13.9 (87)**	Lost by 35 points	TIO Traeger Park (A)	5,072	
11	Saturday, 3 June (1:45 pm)	West Coast	**11.14 (80)**	11.11 (77)	Won by 3 points	Metricon Stadium (H)	11,402	
12	Saturday, 10 June (1:45 pm)	Hawthorn	12.7 (79)	**14.11 (95)**	Won by 16 points	MCG (A)	27,392	
13	Saturday, 17 June (7:25 pm)	Carlton	**11.7 (73)**	12.11 (83)	Lost by 10 points	Metricon Stadium (H)	11,936	
14	Sunday, 25 June (4:40 pm)	St Kilda	14.20 (104)	**10.12 (72)**	Lost by 32 points	Etihad Stadium (A)	15,844	
15	Saturday, 1 July (4:35 pm)	North Melbourne	**18.10 (118)**	14.15 (99)	Won by 19 points	Metricon Stadium (H)	12,779	
16	Saturday, 8 July (4:35 pm)	Sydney	17.16 (118)	**7.9 (51)**	Lost by 67 points	SCG (A)	32,987	
17	Saturday, 15 July (4:35 pm)	Collingwood	**13.10 (88)**	15.13 (103)	Lost by 15 points	Metricon Stadium (H)	17,275	
18	Saturday, 22 July (4:35 pm)	Western Bulldogs	16.14 (110)	**8.8 (56)**	Lost by 54 points	Cazaly's Stadium (A)	9,364	
19	Saturday, 29 July (7:25 pm)	Richmond	**10.5 (65)**	14.14 (98)	Lost by 33 points	Metricon Stadium (H)	16,207	
20	Saturday, 5 August (5:40 pm)	Fremantle	12.18 (90)	**10.7 (67)**	Lost by 23 points	Domain Stadium (A)	27,050	
21	Saturday, 12 August (4:35 pm)	Brisbane Lions	22.10 (142)	**12.12 (84)**	Lost by 58 points	Gabba (A)	17,772	
22	Saturday, 19 August (7:25 pm)	Essendon	**9.3 (57)**	12.18 (90)	Lost by 33 points	Metricon Stadium (H)	16,817	
23	Saturday, 26 August (7:10 pm)	Port Adelaide	20.15 (135)	**3.2 (20)**	Lost by 115 points	Adelaide Oval (A)	34,288	

=== Ladder ===
Pos	Team	Pld	W	L	D	PF	PA	PP	Pts	Qualification
1	Adelaide	22	15	6	1	2415	1776	136.0	62	2017 finals
2	Geelong	22	15	6	1	2134	1818	117.4	62	2017 finals
3	Richmond (P)	22	15	7	0	1992	1684	118.3	60	2017 finals
4	Greater Western Sydney	22	14	6	2	2081	1812	114.8	60	2017 finals
5	Port Adelaide	22	14	8	0	2168	1671	129.7	56	2017 finals
6	Sydney	22	14	8	0	2093	1651	126.8	56	2017 finals
7	Essendon	22	12	10	0	2135	2004	106.5	48	2017 finals
8	West Coast	22	12	10	0	1964	1858	105.7	48	2017 finals
9	Melbourne	22	12	10	0	2035	1934	105.2	48	
10	Western Bulldogs	22	11	11	0	1857	1913	97.1	44	
11	St Kilda	22	11	11	0	1925	1986	96.9	44	
12	Hawthorn	22	10	11	1	1864	2055	90.7	42	
13	Collingwood	22	9	12	1	1944	1963	99.0	38	
14	Fremantle	22	8	14	0	1607	2160	74.4	32	
15	North Melbourne	22	6	16	0	1983	2264	87.6	24	
16	Carlton	22	6	16	0	1594	2038	78.2	24	
**17**	Gold Coast	**22**	**6**	**16**	**0**	**1756**	**2311**	**76.0**	24	
18	Brisbane Lions	22	5	17	0	1877	2526	74.3	20	

Source: AFL
Rules for classification: 1) points; 2) percentage; 3) number of points for.
(P) Premiers

== NEAFL ==
Pos	Team	Pld	W	L	D	PF	PA	PP	Pts
1	Sydney	18	16	2	0	2350	1008	233.1	64
2	Brisbane	18	15	3	0	2138	1373	155.7	60
3	Sydney University	18	14	4	0	1948	1278	152.4	56
4	Gold Coast	18	10	8	0	1767	1528	115.6	40
5	NT Thunder	18	10	8	0	1632	1673	97.5	40
6	Aspley	18	8	10	0	1448	1805	80.2	32
7	Canberra	18	7	11	0	1158	1919	60.3	28
8	Redland	18	4	14	0	1402	1927	72.8	16
9	Southport	18	4	14	0	1257	1870	67.2	16
10	WSU Giants	18	2	16	0	1251	1970	63.5	8

Updated to match(es) played on 10 September 2017. Source: NEAFL
Rules for classification: 1) points; 2) percentage; 3) number of points for.
