= 2010 AFL Under 18 Championships =

Youth Australian rules football competition

- Teams: 8

Division 1
- Teams: 4
- Champions: Vic Country
- Larke Medal: Harley Bennell

Division 2
- Teams: 4
- Champions: Tasmania
- Hunter Harrison Medal: Sam Darley

The 2010 NAB AFL Under 18 Championships was the 15th edition of the AFL Under 18 Championships. Eight teams competed in the championships: Vic Metro, Vic Country, South Australia and Western Australia in Division 1, and New South Wales/Australian Capital Territory (NSW/ACT), Northern Territory, Queensland and Tasmania in Division 2. The competition was played over five rounds, in seven states and territories, across two divisions. In rounds two and four of the competition, the second-division teams crossed over and played the division one sides, while the other three rounds of matches were played between the teams in each the division. Vic Country and Tasmania were the Division 1 and Division 2 champions, respectively. The Larke Medal (for the best player in Division 1) was awarded to Western Australia's Harley Bennell, and the Hunter Harrison Medal (for the best player in Division 2) was won by Tasmania's Sam Darley.

== Results ==
=== Round 1 ===
	Round 1
Saturday, 22 May (11:00 am)	Queensland 8.14 (62)	def. by	Tasmania 10.9 (69)	Blacktown ISP Oval	Report
Saturday, 22 May (1:30 pm)	NSW/ACT 15.12 (102)	def.	Northern Territory 8.13 (61)	Blacktown ISP Oval	Report
Saturday, 29 May (11:30 am)	South Australia 19.12 (126)	def.	Western Australia 8.13 (61)	AAMI Stadium	Report
Sunday, 30 May (9:50 am)	Vic Metro 9.9 (63)	def. by	Vic Country 16.9 (105)	Melbourne Cricket Ground	Report
Anthony Miles (NSW/ACT) amassed 43 possessions and kicked 3 goals in the Rams win over the Northern Territory.

=== Round 2 ===
	Round 2
Saturday, 5 June (11:30 am)	Tasmania 6.5 (41)	def. by	Vic Metro 21.11 (137)	Bellerive Oval	Report
Saturday, 5 June (6:00 pm)	Northern Territory 7.10 (52)	def. by	South Australia 22.16 (148)	TIO Stadium	Report
Sunday, 6 June (10:00 am)	NSW/ACT 6.3 (39)	def. by	Vic Country 16.9 (105)	Blacktown ISP Oval	Report
Sunday, 6 June (12:30 pm)	Queensland 5.6 (36)	def. by	Western Australia 21.25 (151)	Blacktown ISP Oval	Report

=== Round 3 ===
	Round 3
Saturday, 12 June (1:30 pm)	South Australia 10.17 (77)	def. by	Vic Metro 15.10 (100)	Norwood Oval	Report
Sunday, 13 June (11:20 am)	Western Australia 9.11 (65)	def. by	Vic Country 10.11 (71)	Subiaco Oval	Report
Saturday, 19 June (11:00 am)	Tasmania 18.9 (117)	def.	Northern Territory 11.7 (73)	Aurora	Report
Sunday, 20 June (3:40 pm)	Queensland 5.7 (37)	def. by	NSW/ACT 15.21 (111)	Gabba	Report

=== Round 4 ===
	Round 4
Friday, 25 June (2:00 pm)	Vic Metro 18.12 (120)	def.	Northern Territory 4.7 (31)	Visy Park	Report
Saturday, 26 June (9:30 am)	Vic Country 19.13 (127)	def.	Queensland 2.7 (19)	Visy Park	Report
Saturday, 26 June (11:55 am)	NSW/ACT 10.2 (62)	def. by	Western Australia 10.18 (78)	Visy Park	Report
Saturday, 26 June (2:20 pm)	Tasmania 6.3 (39)	def. by	South Australia 18.6 (114)	Visy Park	Report

=== Round 5 ===
	Round 5
Tuesday, 29 June (12:30 pm)	Queensland 9.10 (64)	def. by	Northern Territory 12.7 (79)	Visy Park	Report
Tuesday, 29 June (2:30 pm)	Tasmania 13.6 (84)	def.	NSW/ACT 6.6 (42)	Visy Park	Report
Wednesday, 30 June (12:35 pm)	Vic Metro 11.8 (74)	def.	Western Australia 8.7 (55)	Skilled Stadium	Report
Wednesday, 30 June (2:45 pm)	Vic Country 7.9 (51)	def. by	South Australia 8.7 (55)	Skilled Stadium	Report

== Under 18 All-Australian team ==
The 2010 Under 18 All-Australian team was named on 3 July 2010:

2010 Under 18 All-Australian team
B:	Ben Jacobs (VM)	Matthew Watson (VM)	Dyson Heppell (VC)
HB:	Shaun Atley (VC)	Patrick McCarthy (SA)	Brodie Smith (SA)
C:	Jared Polec (SA)	Mitch Hallahan (VC)	Andrew Gaff (VM)
HF:	Harley Bennell (WA)	Lucas Cook (VC)	Adam Treloar (VC)
F:	Jayden Pitt (VC)	Steven May (NT)	Josh Caddy (VM)
Foll:	Daniel Gorringe (SA)	Anthony Miles (NSW/ACT)	Tom Liberatore (VM)
Int:	Sam Day (SA)	Josh Bruce (NSW/ACT)	Josh Green (Tas)
Int:	Sam Darley (TAS)		
Coach:	Robert Hyde (VC); assistant coach – Matthew Armstrong (Tas)		
