= Keegan Brooksby =

Australian rules footballer (born 1990)

Personal information
- Full name: Keegan Brooksby
- Born: 27 April 1990 (age 36)
- Original team: South Adelaide (SANFL)
- Draft: No. 42, 2015 rookie draft
- Debut: Round 9, 2015, Gold Coast vs. Hawthorn, at Aurora Stadium
- Height: 197 cm (6 ft 6 in)
- Weight: 99 kg (218 lb)
- Position: Ruckman

Playing career^{1}
Years	Club	Games (Goals)
2012–2014, 2018 & 2022-2023	South Adelaide	126 (48)
2015–2017	Gold Coast	14 (3)
2019	West Coast	0 (0)
2020–2021	Hawthorn	1 (0)
Total		141 (51)
- ^{1} Playing statistics correct to the end of 2023.

Career highlights
- Gold Coast NEAFL Player of the Year: 2016; West Coast WAFL best and fairest: 2019

Keegan Brooksby (born 27 April 1990) is a professional Australian rules footballer who most recently played for the Hawthorn Football Club in the Australian Football League (AFL). He played for South Adelaide in the South Australian National Football League and was their best and fairest in 2014 before being selected in the 2015 rookie draft by Gold Coast. He was delisted at the end of 2016, re-drafted in the 2017 rookie draft and subsequently delisted again at the end of 2017.

== SANFL career ==
Brooksby was recruited by South Adelaide in 2008 from a basketball background. He started his career mainly playing for South Adelaide's reserves team but by 2012 was starting to push his way into the league side, even playing for South Adelaide in a Foxtel Cup match against Port Melbourne. In spite of being considered short for a ruckman, his career went on the up in 2013 when he was the most improved player for South Adelaide, giving them a major advantage in ruck contests. In 2014 he consistently played well and was South Adelaide's best and fairest. His good form was rewarded when he was selected with pick 42 in the 2015 rookie draft by Gold Coast.

== AFL career ==
Brooksby was elevated from the rookie list and made his debut against Hawthorn in round 9 of the 2015 season. As he was Gold Coast's third choice ruckman, behind Tom Nicholls and Zac Smith, all of his AFL matches came filling in as a key forward or defender even though his specialty was ruckwork. After playing three AFL games, his season was brought to an early finish when doctors discovered a blood clot in his arm. Later in the year, one of his ribs had to be removed due to the blood clot.

In 2016 Brooksby continued to be Gold Coast's third choice ruckman, now behind Tom Nicholls and Daniel Currie. However, when both of them were injured, Brooksby got his first opportunities to play as a specialist ruckman at AFL level. His final game in 2016 was his best, collecting 17 disposals and winning 29 hit-outs against Port Adelaide in round 23. At the conclusion of the 2016 season, he was delisted by Gold Coast. He was subsequently re-drafted by Gold Coast in the 2017 rookie draft.

Brooksby traveled with the team for the first ever AFL games in China against Port Adelaide. He wasn't initially selected to play, but when teammate Rory Thompson injured his hamstring in the warm-up, Brooksby had to be rushed into the team at the last minute. In 2017 he continued to struggle to play at the top level as he was relegated to fourth ruckman in line thanks to the addition of Jarrod Witts to the team. In spite of this, all three other ruckmen were injured simultaneously towards the end of the season, giving Brooksby another opportunity at AFL level. He was again delisted by Gold Coast at the conclusion of the 2017 season.

After his delisting, Brooksby returned to Adelaide and the team where he got his start, South Adelaide. Brooksby was appointed captain of South Adelaide for 2018 season, where he was the standout ruckman in the state league competition. West Coast thought he could fill a void as he had averaged 35 hitouts and 15 disposals per game in 2018. He joined West Coast via the newly implemented pre-season supplemental selection period. With the return from injury of star ruckman Nic Naitanui the Eagles believed he was surplus for their ruck division so they delisted him.

In March 2020, Brooksby was signed to a one-year rookie deal by Hawthorn in the pre-season supplemental selection period. In Round 8 2020, Brooksby made his debut for Hawthorn in their seven-point loss to Sydney at the SCG. This would be Brooksby's only game for the club as he would be delisted following the 2021 season.

== Personal life ==
Brooksby got engaged to former AFLW player and media personality Abbey Holmes in November 2020. They got married on 6 November 2023 near Uluru.

== Statistics ==
Statistics are correct to the end of 2021.

Legend
G	Goals	K	Kicks	D	Disposals	T	Tackles
B	Behinds	H	Handballs	M	Marks	H/O	Hit-outs

Season	Team	No.	Games	Totals								Averages (per game)								Votes
Season	Team	No.	Games	G	B	K	H	D	M	T	H/O	G	B	K	H	D	M	T	H/O	Votes
2015	Gold Coast	31	3	3	1	13	9	22	10	11	30	1.0	0.3	4.3	3.0	7.3	3.3	3.7	10.0	0
2016	Gold Coast	31	8	0	0	51	49	100	24	26	70	0.0	0.0	6.4	6.1	12.5	3.0	3.3	8.8	0
2017	Gold Coast	31	3	0	0	18	28	46	12	10	36	0.0	0.0	6.0	9.3	15.3	4.0	3.3	12.0	0
2019	West Coast	40	0	—	—	—	—	—	—	—	—	—	—	—	—	—	—	—	—	0
2020	Hawthorn	47	1	0	0	4	1	5	0	2	10	0.0	0.0	4.0	1.0	5.0	0.0	0.0	10.0	0
2021	Hawthorn	31	0	—	—	—	—	—	—	—	—	—	—	—	—	—	—	—	—	0
Career			15	3	1	86	87	173	46	48	146	0.2	0.1	5.7	5.8	11.5	3.1	3.2	9.7	0
