= Jack Leslie (Australian footballer) =

Australian rules footballer

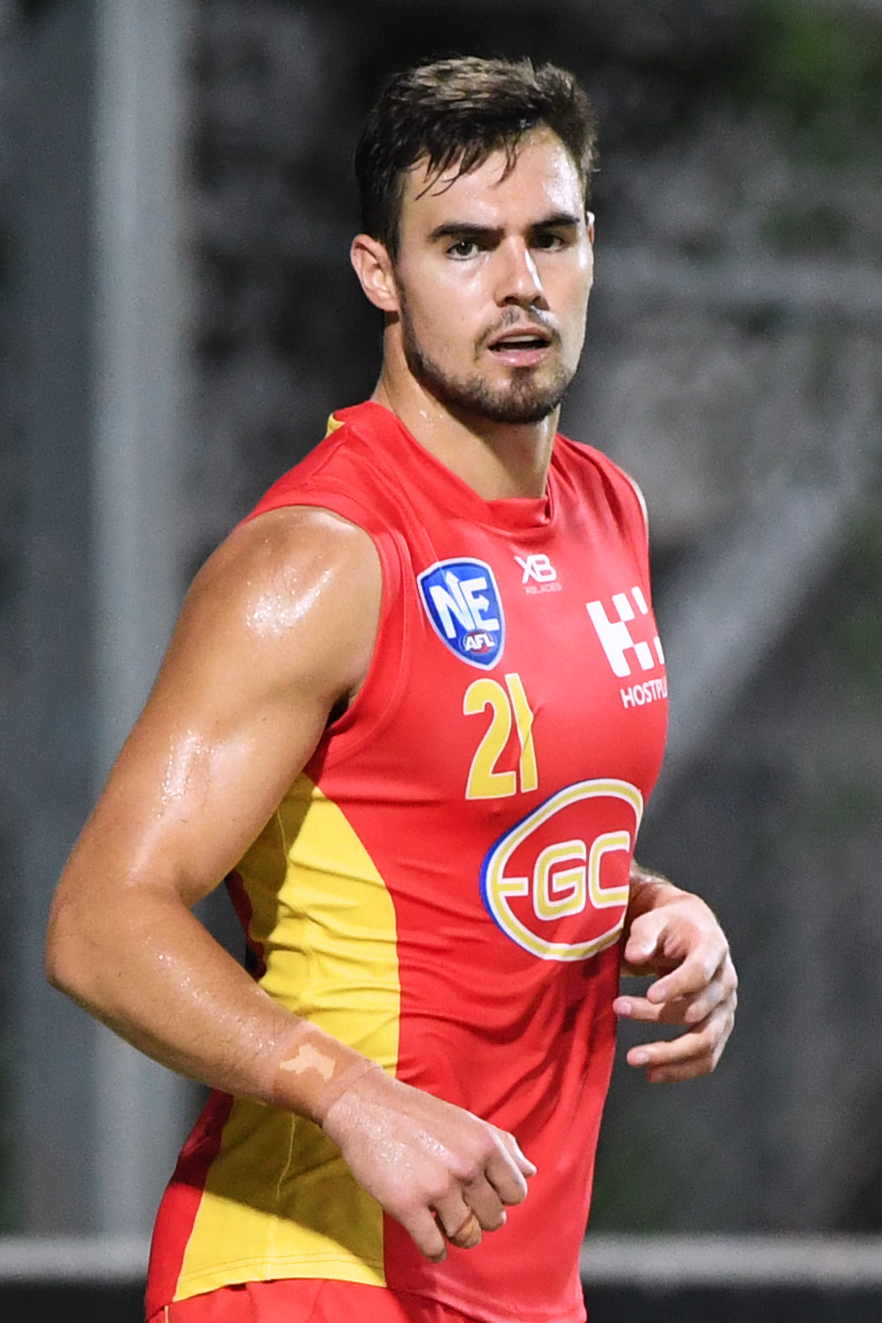
- Leslie playing for Gold Coast in May 2019

Personal information
- Full name: Jack Leslie
- Born: 27 April 1995 (age 31)
- Original team: Gippsland Power (TAC Cup)
- Draft: No. 20, 2013 national draft
- Height: 198 cm (6 ft 6 in)
- Weight: 100 kg (220 lb)
- Position: Defender

Club information
- Current club: Gold Coast
- Number: 21

Playing career^{1}
Years	Club	Games (Goals)
2014–2019	Gold Coast	28 (1)
- ^{1} Playing statistics correct to the end of 2018.

Jack Leslie (born 27 April 1995) is a professional Australian rules footballer who played for the Gold Coast Suns in the Australian Football League (AFL). He was recruited by Gold Coast with the 20th overall selection in the 2013 national draft.

== AFL career ==
Leslie made his AFL debut against Essendon in round 22 of the 2014 season. He got the late call up after Daniel Gorringe withdrew. Leslie kept his spot for the following round against West Coast.
