= Charlie Dixon (Australian footballer) =

Australian rules footballer

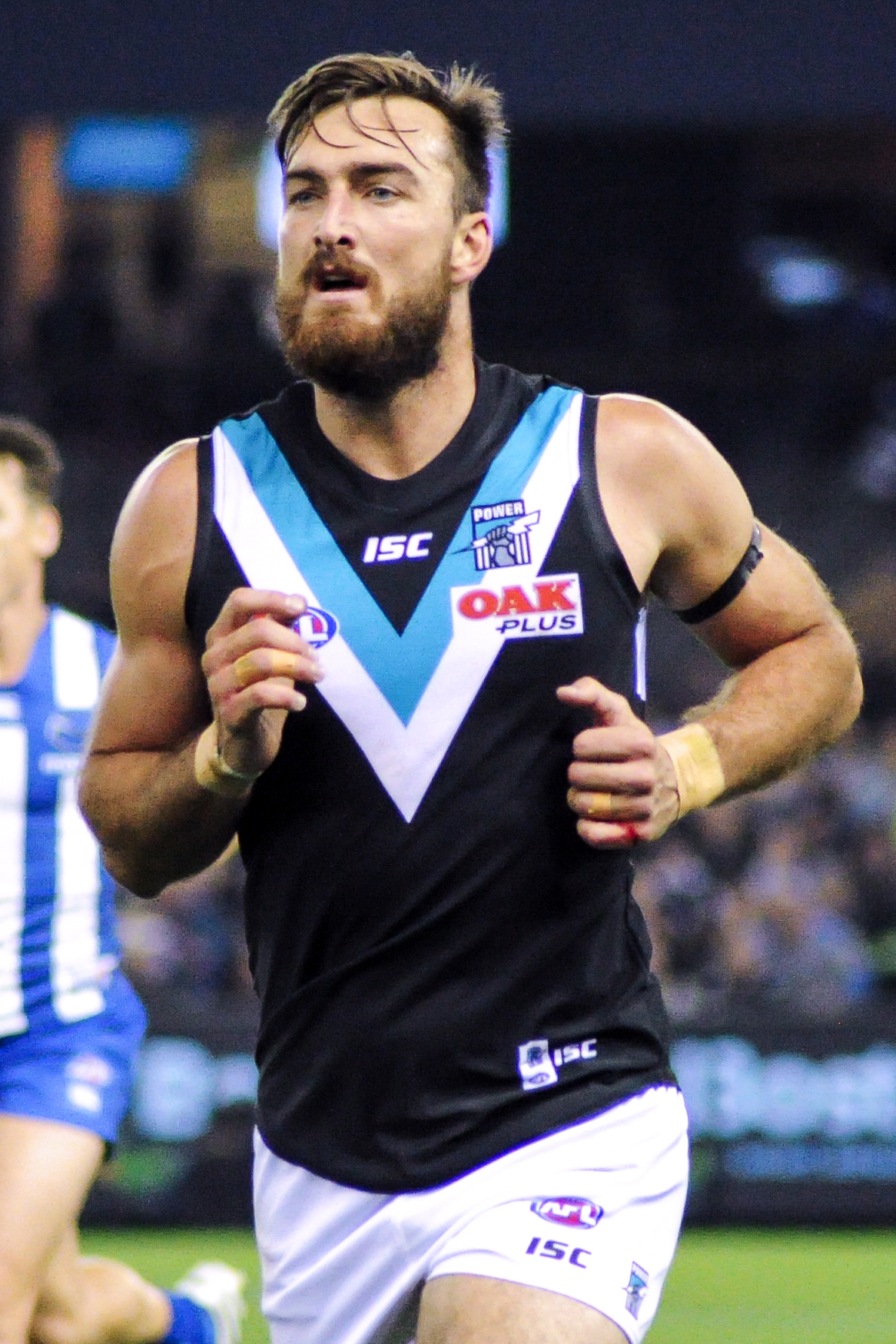
- Dixon playing for Port Adelaide in April 2018

Personal information
- Full name: Charles Dixon
- Born: 23 September 1990 (age 36); Cairns, Queensland
- Original teams: Redland (QAFL); Cairns Saints (AFL Cairns)
- Draft: Zone Selection, 2009, Gold Coast
- Height: 200 cm (6 ft 7 in)
- Weight: 107 kg (236 lb)
- Position: Key forward / ruckman

Club information
- Current club: Port Adelaide
- Number: 22

Playing career
Years	Club	Games (Goals)
2011-2015	Gold Coast	65 (94)
2016–2024	Port Adelaide	156 (263)
Total		221 (357)

Career highlights
- All-Australian (2020); 3× Port Adelaide leading goalkicker: (2017, 2020, 2021); Inaugural Gold Coast AFL team; Marcus Ashcroft Medal: 2015

Charles Dixon (born 23 September 1990) is a former Australian rules footballer who played for Gold Coast and Port Adelaide in the Australian Football League (AFL). He was recruited by the Gold Coast Football Club as a Queensland zoned selection made available to Gold Coast under the AFL's draft concessions. He scored the first-ever goal in the history of the Gold Coast Suns, in their first-ever match on 2 April 2011 against Carlton.

== Early life and junior football ==
Dixon was born and raised in Cairns, Queensland. His parents both played basketball in their younger years and Charlie began playing basketball at the age of four where he made several junior representative sides through the eight years he played the sport.

Dixon began playing junior football with the Redlynch Lions Football Club in 2003. He would then join the Cairns Saints Football Club and made the seniors team at the age of 16. In his last game for the Saints he played in the 2007 AFL Cairns Grand Final on his 17th birthday; the Saints would finish runners-up.

Following graduation from high school at the end of 2007, he and his brother moved to Brisbane, where they were invited to play for the Redland Bombers in the AFL Queensland State League. He worked his way through the Redland ranks before playing for the senior side in 2008. In August 2008, Dixon was the first player ever to sign a contract with the newly formed Gold Coast Football Club for their inaugural year in the TAC Cup. At the beginning of the 2009 TAC Cup season, Dixon was named vice-captain of the club. He played 15 games for the season and also represented the Queensland under 18 teams in the AFL Under 18 Championships 3 times and was a standout.

Dixon's efforts in 2009 would see him officially drafted to the Gold Coast team at the start of 2010 by way of the local talent access selection. In the 2010 season with Gold Coast competing in the Victorian Football League, Dixon was again a standout when he finished the year with 22 goals from 14 games. Halfway through the season Dixon broke the player's code and was sent down to play for the Labrador Tigers for one match before returning to the VFL. He, along with teammate Brandon Matera, were the two leading goalkickers for the Suns in the 2010 VFL season.

== AFL career ==
=== Gold Coast ===
He made his debut in Round 2, 2011 in the Gold Coast Suns' inaugural AFL match against Carlton at the Gabba, with Dixon kicking two of the Suns' goals in their heavy loss, including the club's first ever goal. Two weeks later it was found that Dixon had been playing half-blind his entire football career and required contact lenses. In Round 5, wearing contacts for the first time, Dixon was part of Gold Coast's first AFL victory over Port Adelaide at AAMI Stadium and kicked two goals during the win. He would continue to play each game until round 6 when the Suns suffered their second-worst loss to date, a 139-point loss to the Essendon Bombers. Dixon was subsequently dropped and struggled to regain fitness which would only see him return to the senior side five more times for the season. He ended the 2011 season with 6 goals from 10 games.

Following the 2012 pre-season in which Dixon raced the clock to gain fitness, he managed to shed 5 kg and would return in round 5 against the North Melbourne Kangaroos, kicking two goals in the process. He was then tested in the ruck position for the next few games. In round 7 he suffered a soft tissue injury that would rule him out for 7 games. Upon return Dixon was tried in defence for the Suns and subsequently shone in the following weeks against the likes of Tom Hawkins, Jack Riewoldt and Jonathan Brown.

On 4 July 2015, in a win over North Melbourne, Dixon became the first Suns player to kick seven goals in a game.

=== Port Adelaide ===
In the 2015 AFL Trade Period Dixon was traded to Port Adelaide. At the end of the 2020 AFL season, Dixon finished outright second in the Coleman Medal and earned his first All-Australian selection. Dixon was Port Adelaide's leading goalkicker 3 times; in 2017 (49 goals), 2020 (34 goals), and 2021 (48 goals). Dixon led the league for most contested marks in season 2021, with 46 contested marks, 8 more than second place.

Dixon announced his retirement from the AFL after the conclusion of the 2024 season.

== Statistics ==
Legend
G	Goals	K	Kicks	D	Disposals	T	Tackles
B	Behinds	H	Handballs	M	Marks	H/O	Hit-outs

Season	Team	No.	Games	Totals								Averages (per game)								Votes
Season	Team	No.	Games	G	B	K	H	D	M	T	H/O	G	B	K	H	D	M	T	H/O	Votes
2011	Gold Coast	23	10	6	4	39	38	77	14	18	9	0.6	0.4	3.9	3.8	7.7	1.4	1.8	0.9	0
2012	Gold Coast	23	12	4	6	89	62	151	48	21	93	0.3	0.5	7.4	5.2	12.6	4.0	1.8	7.8	0
2013	Gold Coast	23	13	19	7	93	73	166	42	31	135	1.5	0.5	7.2	5.6	12.8	3.2	2.4	10.4	4
2014	Gold Coast	23	14	24	9	74	55	129	37	28	69	1.7	0.6	5.3	3.9	9.2	2.6	2.0	4.9	0
2015	Gold Coast	23	16	41	15	102	49	151	59	27	32	2.6	0.9	6.4	3.1	9.4	3.7	1.7	2.0	6
2016	Port Adelaide	22	18	30	16	102	103	205	70	31	21	1.7	0.9	5.7	5.7	11.4	3.9	1.7	1.2	2
2017	Port Adelaide	22	23	49	30	218	117	335	149	71	29	2.1	1.3	9.5	5.1	14.6	6.5	3.1	1.3	8
2018	Port Adelaide	22	20	26	24	158	107	265	82	51	159	1.3	1.2	7.9	5.4	13.3	4.1	2.6	8.0	3
2019	Port Adelaide	22	9	13	11	61	40	101	29	19	23	1.4	1.2	6.8	4.4	11.2	3.2	2.1	2.6	0
2020 (Note: The 2020 season was played with 17 home-and-away matches per team (down from 22) and 16-minute quarters with time on (down from 20-minute quarters with time on) due to the impact of the COVID-19 pandemic.)	Port Adelaide	22	18	34	21	110	60	170	69	30	47	1.9	1.2	6.1	3.3	9.4	3.8	1.7	2.6	9
2021	Port Adelaide	22	24	48	24	178	117	295	97	50	104	2.0	1.0	7.4	4.9	12.3	4.0	2.1	4.3	3
2022	Port Adelaide	22	12	16	8	89	83	172	41	27	90	1.3	0.7	7.4	6.9	14.3	3.4	2.3	7.5	1
2023	Port Adelaide	22	14	23	12	105	67	172	67	30	104	1.6	0.9	7.5	4.8	12.3	4.8	2.1	7.4	3
2024	Port Adelaide	22	18	24	18	102	85	187	64	26	117	1.3	1.0	5.7	4.7	10.4	3.6	1.4	6.5	3
2025	Port Adelaide	22	0	—	—	—	—	—	—	—	—	—	—	—	—	—	—	—	—	0
Career			221	357	205	1520	1056	2576	868	460	1032	1.6	0.9	6.9	4.8	11.7	3.9	2.1	4.7	42
