= Jackson Allen =

Australian rules footballer (born 1993)

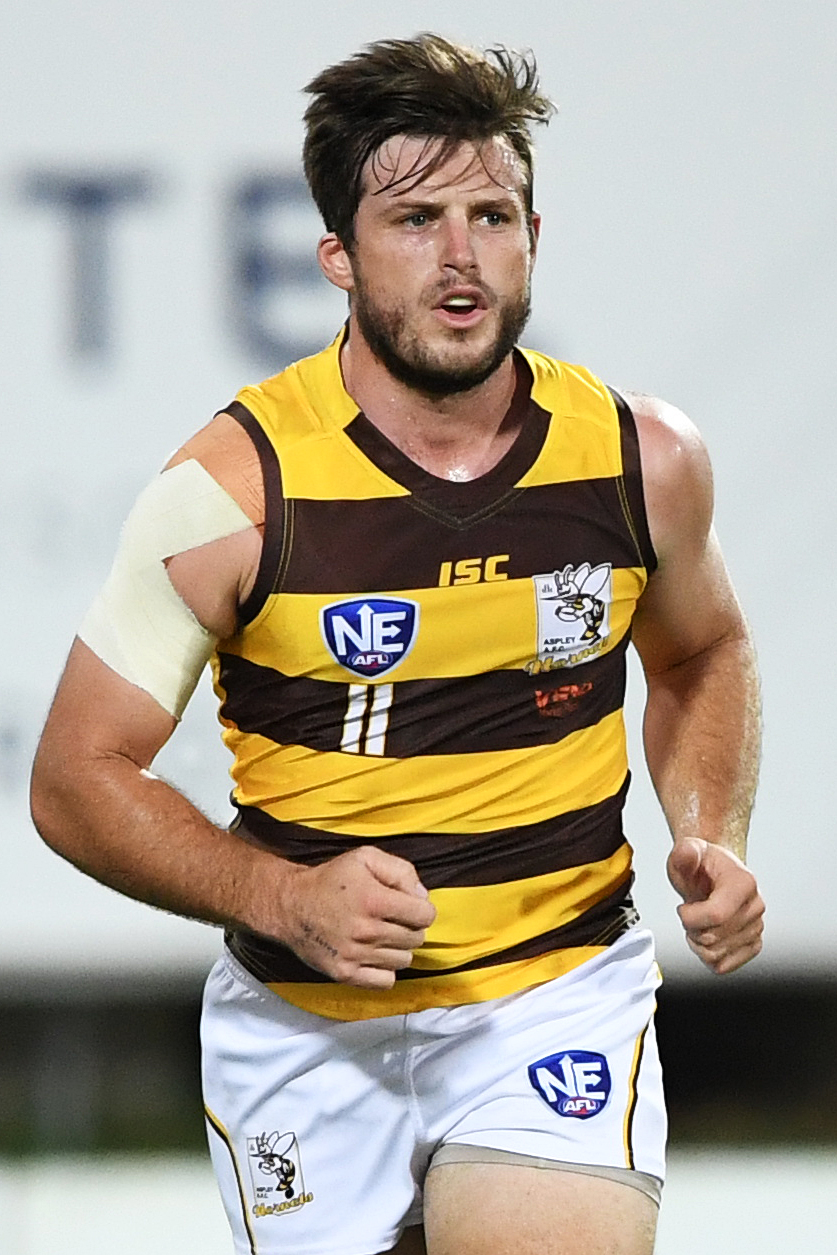
- Allen in May 2019

Personal information
- Full name: Jackson Allen
- Born: 14 April 1993 (age 33)
- Original team: Morningside (NEAFL)
- Draft: No. 91 (QLDZS), 2011 National Draft, Gold Coast
- Height: 179 cm (5 ft 10 in)
- Weight: 105 kg (231 lb)

Playing career^{1}
Years	Club	Games (Goals)
2012–2013	Gold Coast	4 (0)
- ^{1} Playing statistics correct to the end of 2013.

Jackson Allen (born 14 April 1993) is a former professional Australian rules football player at the Gold Coast Football Club in the Australian Football League (AFL).

He was recruited by the club in the 2011 National Draft, with pick #91, as a Queensland zone selection. Allen made his debut in Round 20, 2012, against Greater Western Sydney at Carrara Stadium. He played four games over two seasons before being delisted at the end of the 2014 season.

In 2019 Allen was named co-captain of the Aspley Hornets in the NEAFL

== Statistics ==
Legend
G	Goals	K	Kicks	D	Disposals	T	Tackles
B	Behinds	H	Handballs	M	Marks

Season	Team	No.	Games	Totals							Averages (per game)						
Season	Team	No.	Games	G	B	K	H	D	M	T	G	B	K	H	D	M	T
2012	Gold Coast	31	1	0	0	11	4	15	5	4	0.0	0.0	11.0	4.0	15.0	5.0	4.0
2013	Gold Coast	31	3	0	0	21	3	24	12	5	0.0	0.0	7.0	1.0	8.0	4.0	1.7
Career			4	0	0	32	7	39	17	9	0.0	0.0	8.0	1.8	9.8	4.3	2.3
