= Tom Murphy (footballer, born 1986) =

Australian rules footballer

Thomas Murphy

Personal information
- Full name: Thomas Murphy
- Nickname: McColl
- Born: 19 March 1986 (age 40)
- Original team: Sandringham Dragons (TAC Cup)
- Draft: No. 21, 2004 national draft
- Debut: Round 22, 2005, Hawthorn vs. Sydney, at Melbourne Cricket Ground
- Height: 189 cm (6 ft 2 in)
- Weight: 85 kg (187 lb)
- Position: Defender

Playing career^{1}
Years	Club	Games (Goals)
2005–2012	Hawthorn	95 (5)
2013–2014	Gold Coast	18 (0)
Total		113 (5)
- ^{1} Playing statistics correct to the end of 2014.

Thomas Murphy (born 19 March 1986) is a former Australian rules football player who played with the Hawthorn Football Club and Gold Coast Suns in the Australian Football League. Murphy was selected with the 21st pick in the 2004 AFL draft and was a defender.

He spent the bulk of his debut year with the Box Hill Hawks at Victorian Football League level, but broke into the Hawthorn side for the final game of the year. In 2006 he added a further seven games and kicked his first goal. Murphy played 18 games in 2008 and was listed as an emergency for the 2008 Grand Final. In 2008 he mainly played on the third tall forward but due to injuries to other defenders Murphy played as the full back. He was voted Best Clubman in 2010. Prior to the 2012 AFL Grand Final between Hawthorn and Sydney, Murphy was dropped from the side and replaced by Hawthorn captain Luke Hodge.

On 12 October 2012, Murphy signed a two-year contract with Gold Coast as an unrestricted free agent. He retired from professional football at the end of the 2014 AFL season.

== Statistics ==
Legend
G	Goals	K	Kicks	D	Disposals	T	Tackles
B	Behinds	H	Handballs	M	Marks

Season	Team	No.	Games	Totals							Averages (per game)							Votes
Season	Team	No.	Games	G	B	K	H	D	M	T	G	B	K	H	D	M	T	Votes
2005	Hawthorn	41	1	0	0	2	2	4	2	0	0.0	0.0	2.0	2.0	4.0	2.0	0.0	0
2006	Hawthorn	29	7	1	0	52	39	91	41	8	0.1	0.0	7.4	5.6	13.0	5.9	1.1	0
2007	Hawthorn	29	4	2	2	33	22	55	27	10	0.5	0.5	8.3	5.5	13.8	6.8	2.5	0
2008	Hawthorn	29	18	0	0	113	128	241	84	38	0.0	0.0	6.3	7.1	13.4	4.7	2.1	0
2009	Hawthorn	29	19	0	0	129	141	270	91	60	0.0	0.0	6.8	7.4	14.2	4.8	3.2	0
2010	Hawthorn	29	21	0	0	151	156	307	110	40	0.0	0.0	7.2	7.4	14.6	5.2	1.9	0
2011	Hawthorn	29	19	0	0	172	107	279	111	41	0.0	0.0	9.1	5.6	14.7	5.8	2.2	0
2012	Hawthorn	29	6	2	1	46	39	85	22	15	0.3	0.2	7.7	6.5	14.2	3.7	2.5	0
2013	Gold Coast	29	17	0	0	158	82	240	77	43	0.0	0.0	9.3	4.8	14.1	4.5	2.5	0
2014	Gold Coast	29	1	0	0	10	3	13	4	2	0.0	0.0	10.0	3.0	13.0	4.0	2.0	0
Career			113	5	3	866	719	1585	569	257	0.0	0.0	7.7	6.4	14.0	5.0	2.3	0

== Honours and achievements ==
Team

- Minor premiership (Hawthorn): 2012
