= Mark Riley (Australian rules coach) =

Australian rules football coach

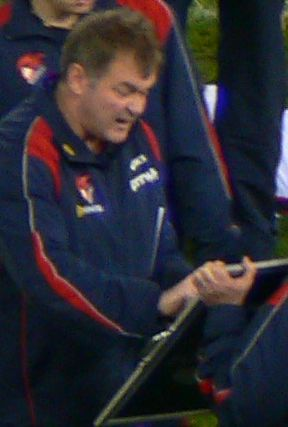

Personal information
- Full name: Mark Riley
- Born: 10 October 1963 (age 63); Perth, Western Australia

Coaching career
Years	Club	Games (W–L–D)
2007	Melbourne	9 (3–6–0)

Mark Riley (born 10 October 1963) is a former Australian rules footballer, most notably as the caretaker senior coach of the Melbourne Football Club in the 2007 season, after senior coach Neale Daniher resigned. Riley was not retained as Melbourne Football Club senior coach at the end of the 2007 season, due to the appointment of Dean Bailey as Melbourne Football Club senior coach. Riley also was an assistant coach with the Fremantle Football Club, Carlton Football Club and the Gold Coast Suns.

== Playing career ==
As a player Riley played for junior and reserves football for Perth and Claremont in the WAFL before knee injuries forced his retirement. He also played Sunday league football as well as cricket, including being selected for a state squad. As a teacher, he then moved to small rural towns including Hyden, Narrogin and Kellerberrin. At Kellerberrin he coached Gerard Neesham and built up a friendship that would later see Riley take over from Neesham as coach of Claremont when Neesham was appointed coach of the newly formed Fremantle Football Club in mid-1994. Riley would lead Claremont to the 1994 WAFL Grand Final, but they lost to East Fremantle.

== Coaching career ==
=== Fremantle Football Club ===
Riley then joined Fremantle Football Club on its entry into the AFL in 1995 and was the club's development coach from 1995–97 and assistant coach from 1998 until 2000, where he worked under senior coaches Gerard Neesham and Damian Drum.

=== Claremont ===
2001 and 2002 saw him return to Claremont as senior coach where he was awarded the JJ Leonard Western Australian Football Coach of the Year award in 2002.

=== Melbourne Football Club ===
Riley then joined the Melbourne Football Club in 2003 as an assistant coach under senior coach Neale Daniher. When Daniher resigned in the middle of the 2007 season, Riley was then appointed the caretaker senior coach of Melbourne Football Club for the remainder of the 2007 season from Round 14 onwards. Melbourne under Riley won three of the nine games he coached to finish 14th on the ladder at the end of the 2007 season. Riley was however not retained as Melbourne Football Club senior coach at the end of the 2007 season and was replaced by Dean Bailey as Melbourne Football Club senior coach. Riley then left the Melbourne Football Club.

=== Carlton Football Club ===
Riley joined the Carlton Football Club as an assistant coach under senior coach Brett Ratten for the 2008 season, mainly focusing on the Blues' midfield. In 2009, Riley was presented with the AFL Coaches Association Assistant Coach of the Year after doing a fine job with the Carlton midfielders.

In 2012, Riley's position as assistant coach of Carlton was made redundant. At the end of the 2012 season, Riley then left the Carlton Football Club.

=== Gold Coast Suns ===
At the end of 2012, Riley then joined Gold Coast Suns as an assistant coach under senior coach Guy McKenna and then under senior coach Rodney Eade from 2015. Riley left Gold Coast Suns at the end of the 2015 season.

=== Other coaching roles ===
In October 2015, it was announced that Riley would be coaching the St Bernard's for the 2016 season in the Victorian Amateur Football Association (VAFA). On 1 September 2019, Riley retired from his role as senior coach of St Bernard’s Football Club.

In April 2017, Riley was also appointed the head coach of the East Sandringham Rovers Gold u/15s at the same time, he was coaching St Bernard's, having two coaching jobs at the same time with two different teams in two different leagues.

Riley now works with the Clontarf Foundation, which works with indigenous boys in attracting and keeping them at School and then transitioning the boys to employment or university. Clontarf has grown from 1 academy with 25 boys to now operate on a national level with over 6000 indigenous boys in full-time education programs.
