= Matthew Warnock =

Australian rules footballer

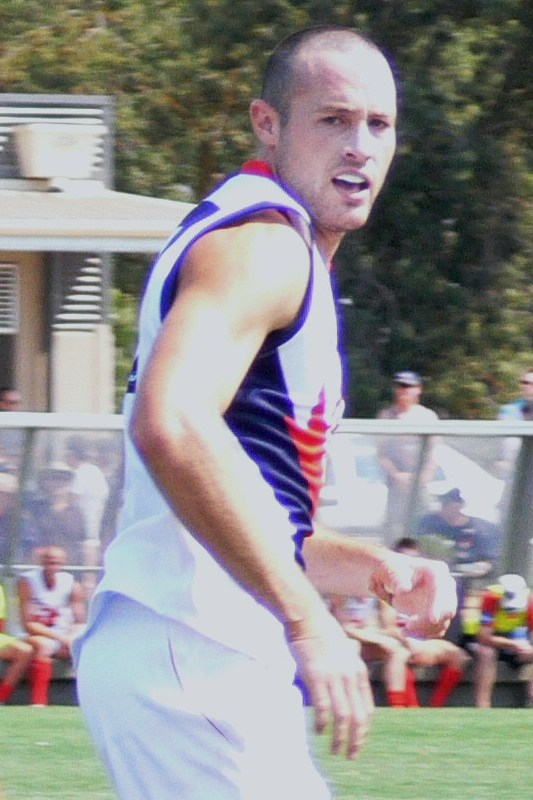
- Warnock with Melbourne in 2009

Personal information
- Full name: Matthew Warnock
- Born: 3 April 1984 (age 42)
- Original team: Sandringham (VFL)
- Draft: No. 26, 2005 Rookie Draft, Melbourne
- Height: 194 cm (6 ft 4 in)
- Weight: 95 kg (209 lb)
- Position: Defender

Playing career^{1}
Years	Club	Games (Goals)
2005–2011	Melbourne	55 (1)
2012–2014	Gold Coast	32 (0)
Total		87 (1)
- ^{1} Playing statistics correct to the end of 2014.

Matthew Warnock (born 3 April 1984) is a former professional Australian rules footballer who played for the Gold Coast Football Club in the Australian Football League (AFL). He began his AFL career playing for Melbourne where he wore the No. 1 guernsey (previously No. 37), and was recruited from the Sandringham Zebras in the Victorian Football League (VFL).

On 17 October 2011, after 55 games with Melbourne, Warnock was traded to Gold Coast in a complex three-team trade that also included the Brisbane Lions. Matthew's younger brother Robert Warnock played for Fremantle and Carlton.

== Statistics ==
Statistics are correct as of round 22, 2010 (29 August 2010)

Season	Team	No.	Games	Goals	Behinds	Kicks	Marks	Handballs	Disposals
2006	Melbourne	37	2	0	0	5	4	5	10
2007	Melbourne	37	2	1	0	11	9	9	20
2008	Melbourne	37	17	0	0	87	67	121	208
2009	Melbourne	37	17	0	0	83	70	108	191
2010	Melbourne	1	13	0	0	63	41	83	146
Totals			51	1	0	249	191	326	575
