= Tim Sumner (footballer) =

Australian rules footballer

Timmy Sumner

Personal information
- Full name: Tim Sumner
- Born: 9 October 1994 (age 32)
- Original team: Woodville-West Torrens (SANFL)
- Draft: No. 55, 2012 National Draft, Gold Coast
- Height: 188 cm (6 ft 2 in)
- Weight: 75 kg (165 lb)

Playing career^{1}
Years	Club	Games (Goals)
2013–2015	Gold Coast	17 (6)
- ^{1} Playing statistics correct to the end of 2015.

Timmy Sumner (born 9 October 1994) is a former professional Australian rules footballer who played for the Gold Coast Football Club in the Australian Football League (AFL). He was recruited by the club in the 2012 National Draft, with pick No. 55. Sumner made his debut in Round 10, 2013, against Geelong at Kardinia Park. Sumner retired from the game on 8 April 2015. He played 17 games for the Suns.

== Statistics ==
Legend
G	Goals	K	Kicks	D	Disposals	T	Tackles
B	Behinds	H	Handballs	M	Marks

Season	Team	No.	Games	Totals							Averages (per game)						
Season	Team	No.	Games	G	B	K	H	D	M	T	G	B	K	H	D	M	T
2013	Gold Coast	39	11	6	12	62	34	96	30	17	0.5	1.1	5.6	3.1	8.7	2.7	1.5
2014	Gold Coast	3	6	0	5	21	20	41	4	13	0.0	0.8	3.5	3.3	6.8	0.7	2.2
2015	Gold Coast	3	0	—	—	—	—	—	—	—	—	—	—	—	—	—	—
Career			17	6	17	83	54	137	34	30	0.4	1.0	4.9	3.2	8.1	2.0	1.8
