= Sam Day (Australian footballer) =

Australian rules footballer

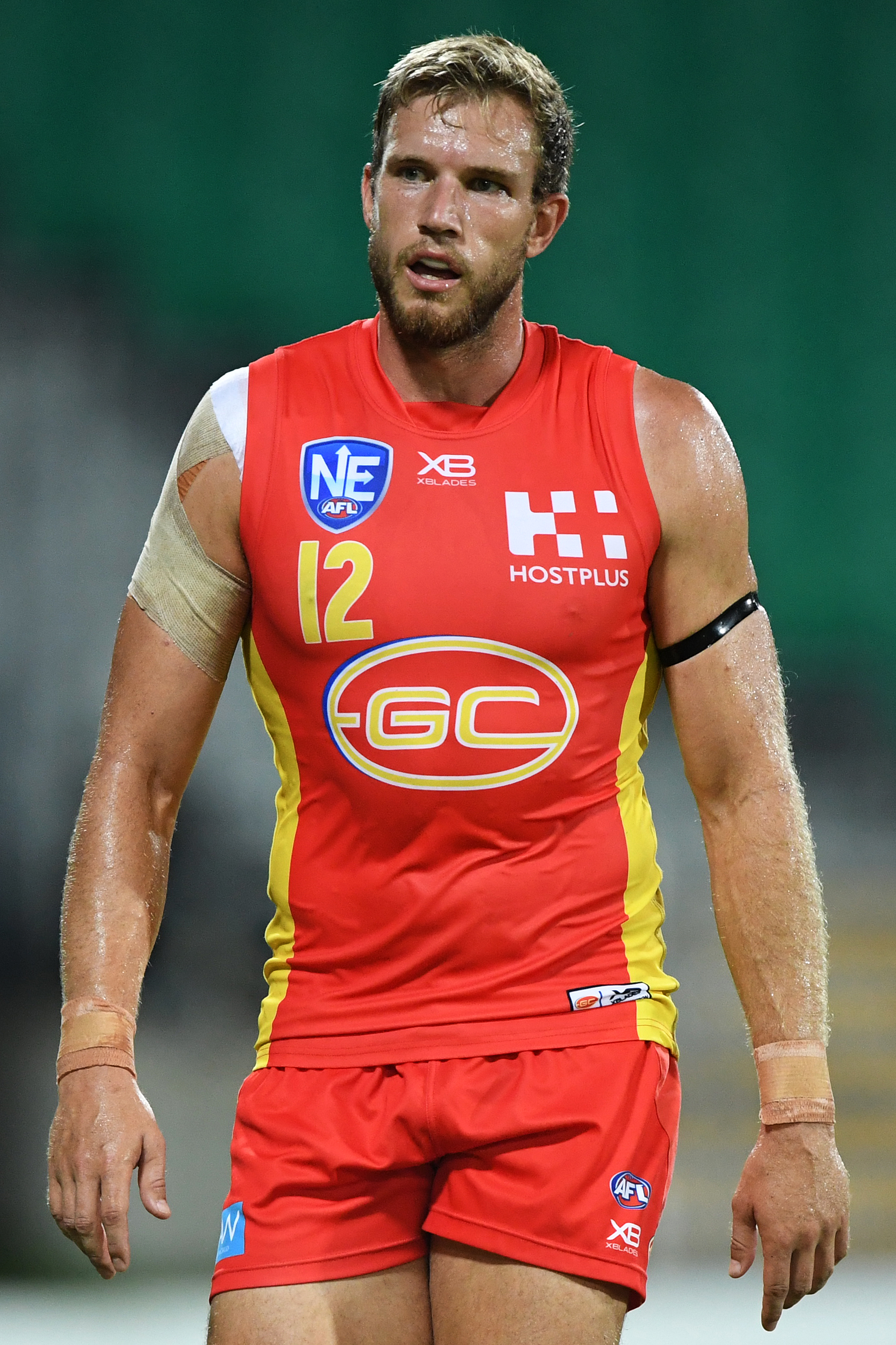
- Day playing for Gold Coast in May 2019

Personal information
- Full name: Sam Day
- Born: 6 September 1992 (age 34); Adelaide, South Australia
- Original team: Sturt (SANFL)
- Draft: No. 3, 2010 National draft, Gold Coast; No. 2, 2023 pre-season draft (Gold Coast); No. 2, 2024 pre-season draft (Brisbane Lions)
- Debut: Round 7, 2011, Gold Coast vs. Brisbane Lions, at the Gabba
- Height: 197 cm (6 ft 6 in)
- Weight: 102 kg (225 lb)
- Position: Key Forward / Ruckman

Club information
- Current club: Southport
- Number: 15

Playing career^{1}
Years	Club	Games (Goals)
2011–2024	Gold Coast	155 (117)
2025	Brisbane Lions	13 (3)
Total		168 (120)
- ^{1} Playing statistics correct to the end of the 2025 season.

Career highlights
- VFL premiership player: 2023

Sam Day (born 6 September 1992) is a professional Australian rules footballer who currently plays for the Southport Sharks in the Victorian Football League (VFL), having previously played for the Gold Coast Suns and the Brisbane Lions in the Australian Football League (AFL).

== Early life ==
Day was born in Adelaide, South Australia. His grandfather Ian Day and great-uncle Robert Day both had long SANFL careers, while his uncle Tim Day represented the Australian national baseball team. Sam Day grew up playing a variety of sports and by high school he continued to play football, baseball and basketball at a high level. He attended Prince Alfred College throughout his schooling years and was forced to choose between baseball and basketball college offers in the United States or nominating for the AFL's national draft. After a strong final year with Sturt in the SANFL and an All-Australian selection at the Under 18 national championships, Day settled on football. He was selected by the Gold Coast with the third pick in the 2010 national draft. Day is cousins with Hawthorn player Will Day.

== AFL career ==
Day made his AFL debut for the Gold Coast Suns against the Brisbane Lions in round 7 of the 2011 season. He kicked a career-high four goals against Collingwood in 2014.

In 2016, with the Suns' list severely impacted by injury, coach Rodney Eade moved Day into defence where he proved to be an effective tall defender. He was expected to return to the forward line in 2017, but he suffered a serious hip injury in the pre-season clash against the Brisbane Lions, which ultimately resulted in him missing the entire 2017 season.

Day was not offered a contract by the Gold Coast suns for the 2025 season. It was later reported that the Brisbane Lions were considering signing Day as a potential replacement for the recently retired Joe Daniher. This was confirmed when the Lions picked up Day in the Pre-Season draft.

Day played 13 games for his new club in 2025. He was omitted from the team following his first final, which was the qualifying final against Geelong. Unfortunately, Day did not return to the team before Brisbane won the premiership a few weeks later over the same opponent. He retired from the AFL following the conclusion of the season.

== Statistics ==
Updated to the end of the 2025 season.

Legend
G	Goals	K	Kicks	D	Disposals	T	Tackles
B	Behinds	H	Handballs	M	Marks	H/O	Hit-outs

Season	Team	No.	Games	Totals								Averages (per game)								Votes
Season	Team	No.	Games	G	B	K	H	D	M	T	H/O	G	B	K	H	D	M	T	H/O	Votes
2011	Gold Coast	39	7	2	5	20	32	52	18	4	2	0.3	0.7	2.9	4.6	7.4	2.6	0.6	0.3	0
2012	Gold Coast	12	15	10	10	56	65	121	46	16	16	0.7	0.7	3.7	4.3	8.1	3.1	1.1	1.1	0
2013	Gold Coast	12	20	12	8	112	93	205	72	35	36	0.6	0.4	5.6	4.7	10.3	3.6	1.8	1.8	0
2014	Gold Coast	12	22	19	9	133	93	226	74	38	120	0.9	0.4	6.0	4.2	10.3	3.4	1.7	5.5	2
2015	Gold Coast	12	14	8	2	64	52	116	45	25	26	0.6	0.1	4.6	3.7	8.3	3.2	1.8	1.9	0
2016	Gold Coast	12	20	14	12	127	103	230	88	55	26	0.7	0.6	6.4	5.2	11.5	4.4	2.8	1.3	1
2018	Gold Coast	12	12	9	5	61	57	118	40	28	51	0.8	0.4	5.1	4.8	9.8	3.3	2.3	4.3	0
2019	Gold Coast	12	10	11	4	61	55	116	50	21	44	1.1	0.4	6.1	5.5	11.6	5.0	2.1	4.4	0
2020 (Note: The 2020 season was played with 17 home-and-away matches per team (down from 22) and 16-minute quarters with time on (down from 20-minute quarters with time on) due to the impact of the COVID-19 pandemic.)	Gold Coast	12	17	12	7	68	79	147	47	21	52	0.7	0.4	4.0	4.6	8.6	2.8	1.2	3.1	2
2021	Gold Coast	12	6	3	4	26	27	53	23	17	23	0.5	0.7	4.3	4.5	8.8	3.8	2.8	3.8	0
2022	Gold Coast	12	4	6	1	19	7	26	10	5	8	1.5	0.3	4.8	1.8	6.5	2.5	1.3	2.0	0
2023	Gold Coast	12	3	1	1	13	6	19	10	5	2	0.3	0.3	4.3	2.0	6.3	3.3	1.7	0.7	0
2024	Gold Coast	12	5	10	4	27	18	45	27	9	25	2.0	0.8	5.4	3.6	9.0	5.4	1.8	5.0	0
2025	Brisbane Lions	14	13	3	4	61	43	104	41	23	93	0.2	0.3	4.7	3.3	8.0	3.2	1.8	7.2	0
Career			168	120	76	848	730	1578	591	302	524	0.7	0.5	5.0	4.3	9.4	3.5	1.8	3.1	5
