= Luke Russell =

Australian rules footballer (born 1992)

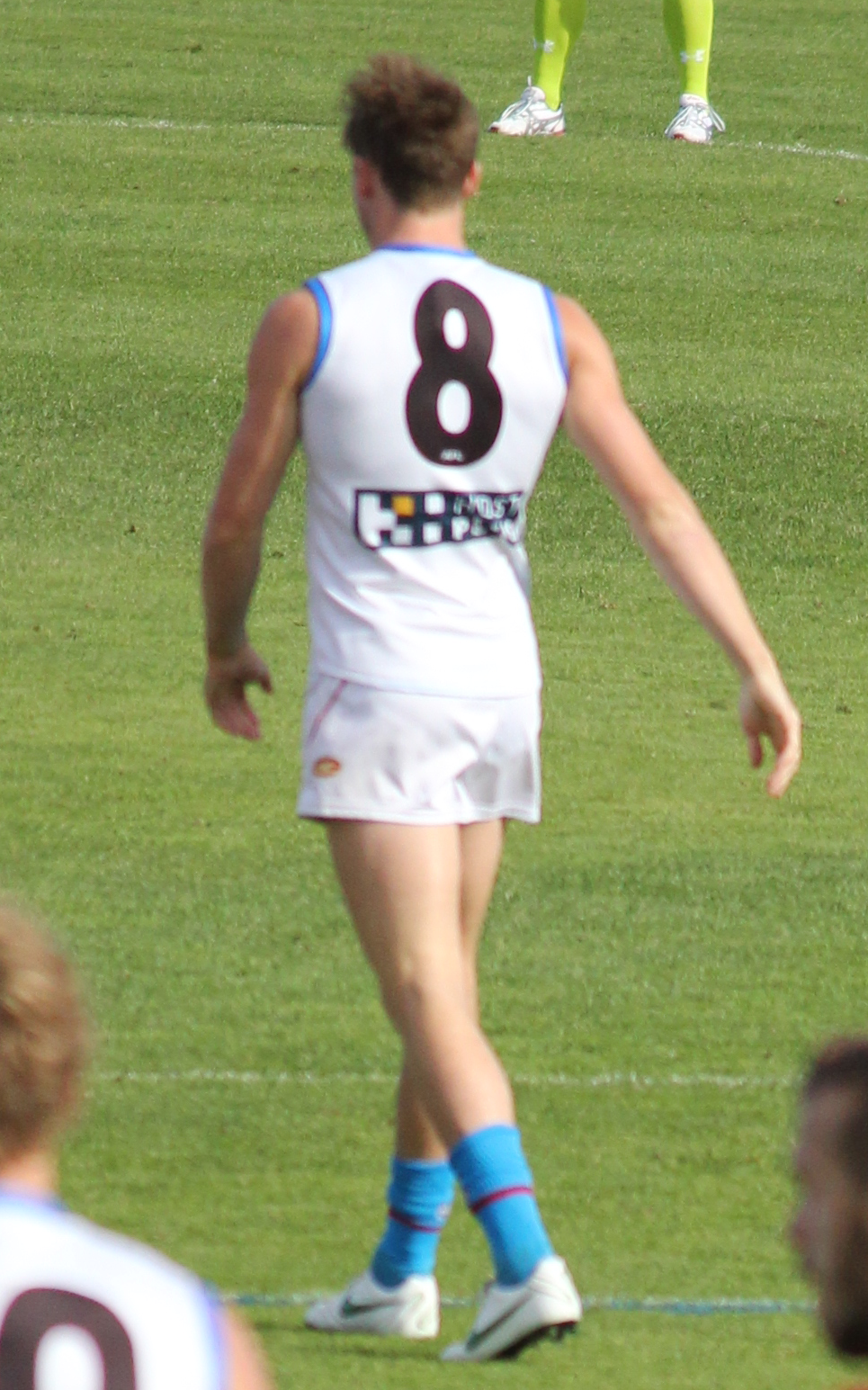
- Russell playing for Gold Coast in 2012

Personal information
- Full name: Luke Russell
- Born: 24 January 1992 (age 34); Burnie, Tasmania, Australia
- Original team: Burnie Dockers (TFL)
- Draft: Underage recruit, Gold Coast
- Height: 186 cm (6 ft 1 in)
- Weight: 90 kg (198 lb)
- Position: Forward / Midfielder

Club information
- Current club: Burnie

Playing career^{1}
Years	Club	Games (Goals)
2011–2016	Gold Coast	73 (29)
- ^{1} Playing statistics correct to the end of 2016.

Career highlights
- nil

Luke Russell is an Australian rules footballer who plays for the Penguin Football Club in the Tasmanian North West Football League (NWFL). Formerly a player in the Australian Football League (AFL), he was drafted by Gold Coast Football Club as an underage player from Burnie Dockers. He made his AFL debut against Melbourne in round 4 of the 2011 season.

== Early life ==
Luke Russell was born in Burnie, Tasmania and grew up playing Basketball. He represented Tasmania at the state level in Basketball and would be chosen in the Australian u19 development squad in 2007. Due to many injuries he would give up playing Basketball in 2008 and focus on Australian rules football solely.

He attended Marist Regional College alongside future Gold Coast Suns teammate Maverick Weller.

== Junior football ==
Russell began his junior football with the Burnie Dockers who compete in the Tasmanian Football League and made his debut in the seniors team in 2008 as a 16-year-old. His form for Burnie in 2008 would earn him a spot in the Tasmanian team that competed in the Australian U16 Championships and was given an AIS scholarship later that year. At 17 years old he would be selected as the captain of the U18 Tasmanian team that competed in the 2009 AFL Under 18 Championships. Following his performance in the National Championships he was signed as an underage recruit by the Gold Coast Football Club to compete in the Victorian Football League in 2010. In November 2009 he relocated to the Gold Coast with Burnie teammate Maverick Weller to play for the Gold Coast in the VFL.

== Senior career ==
He made his AFL debut against Melbourne at the Gabba in round 4 of the 2011 season. In his second game for the Gold Coast he would come on as a substitute and kick the winning goal in the club's first ever AFL victory. He was delisted at the conclusion of the 2016 season.

Russell joined VFL side, Northern Blues, in November 2016.

Russell, along with fellow former AFL player, Mav Weller, joined the Penguin Football Club as coach-players for the 2021 season.

Luke won The Penguin Football Club's Tommy Kaine Medal in 2021 for The Best and Fairest. He also took out The Advocate Newspaper's Player of the Year award.

Russell will Coach the Penguin Football Club's Under 18 team in 2022.

== Statistics ==
Legend
G	Goals	K	Kicks	D	Disposals	T	Tackles
B	Behinds	H	Handballs	M	Marks

Season	Team	No.	Games	Totals							Averages (per game)						
Season	Team	No.	Games	G	B	K	H	D	M	T	G	B	K	H	D	M	T
2011	Gold Coast	8	11	5	9	69	49	118	30	27	0.5	0.8	6.3	4.5	10.7	2.7	2.5
2012	Gold Coast	8	14	6	5	132	85	217	66	36	0.4	0.4	9.4	6.1	15.5	4.7	2.6
2013	Gold Coast	8	18	6	5	153	112	265	74	39	0.3	0.3	8.5	6.2	14.7	4.1	2.2
2014	Gold Coast	8	13	6	4	91	60	151	42	27	0.5	0.3	7.0	4.6	11.6	3.2	2.1
2015	Gold Coast	8	14	6	6	105	78	183	42	34	0.4	0.4	7.5	5.6	13.1	3.0	2.4
2016	Gold Coast	8	3	0	2	14	19	33	7	7	0.0	0.7	4.7	6.3	11.0	2.3	2.3
Career			73	29	31	564	403	967	261	170	0.4	0.4	7.7	5.5	13.2	3.6	2.3
