= Matt Shaw (Australian rules footballer) =

Australian rules footballer

Personal information
- Full name: Matthew Shaw
- Born: 5 February 1992 (age 34)
- Original team: Dandenong Stingrays (TAC Cup)
- Draft: Underage recruit, Gold Coast; No. 3, 2018 rookie draft, Carlton
- Height: 187 cm (6 ft 2 in)
- Weight: 71 kg (157 lb)
- Position: Defender

Club information
- Current club: Southport Sharks
- Number: 3

Playing career^{1}
Years	Club	Games (Goals)
2011–2017	Gold Coast	102 (33)
2018	Carlton	2 (0)
Total		104 (33)
- ^{1} Playing statistics correct to the end of 2018.

Matthew Shaw (born 5 February 1992) is a former professional Australian rules footballer with the Carlton Football Club and previously the Gold Coast Football Club from 2011 to 2018 in the Australian Football League (AFL). He was recruited as an underage player from the Dandenong Stingrays. He made his debut against Melbourne in round 4 of the 2011 season.

Shaw played his junior football with Chelsea & Carrum Junior Football Clubs. He was also a keen cricketer who played for the Carrum Cricket Club & attended Mordialloc College. He supported St Kilda as a child.

He was delisted by Gold Coast at the conclusion of the 2017 season.

Shaw was rookie listed with pick three by Carlton in the 2018 rookie draft and delisted by Carlton at the conclusion of 2018, having played two games for the club.

Following Shaw's departure from Carlton, he signed with the Southport Sharks in the NEAFL.
