= Aaron Hall (footballer) =

Australian rules footballer (born 1990)

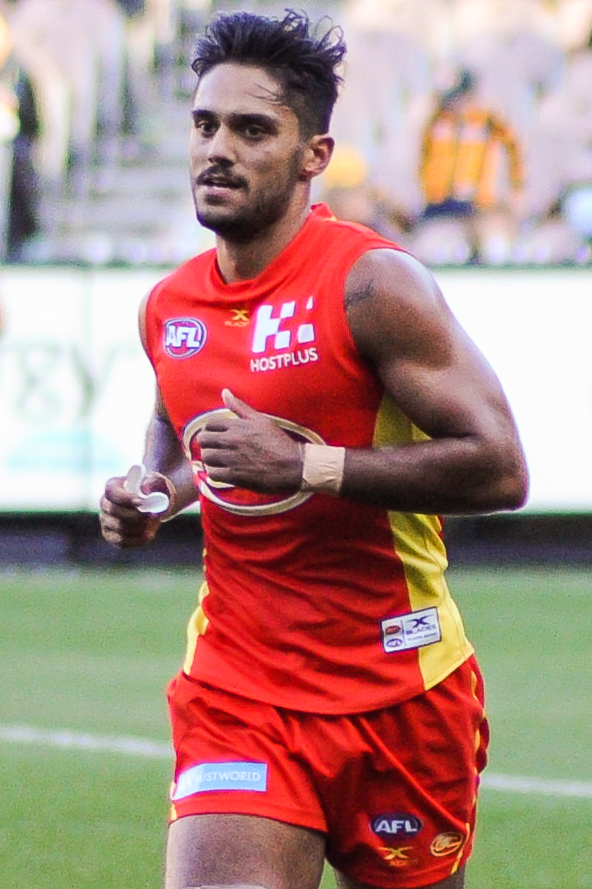
- Hall playing for Gold Coast in June 2017

Personal information
- Full name: Aaron Hall
- Born: 9 November 1990 (age 35); Hobart
- Original team: Hobart (TFL)
- Draft: No. 7, 2012 Pre-season Draft, Gold Coast
- Height: 186 cm (6 ft 1 in)
- Weight: 85 kg (187 lb)
- Position: Defender

Playing career^{1}
Years	Club	Games (Goals)
2012–2018	Gold Coast	103 (76)
2019–2023	North Melbourne	58 (18)
Total		161 (94)
- ^{1} Playing statistics correct to the end of End of 2023 Season.

Aaron Hall (born 9 November 1990) is a former Australian rules footballer who played for the Gold Coast Suns and the North Melbourne Football Club in the Australian Football League (AFL).

== Early life ==
Hall was born in Hobart to a Fijian mother and an Australian father. His mother, Naz, moved to Australia in 1983 as she won a scholarship to study in Tasmania. His father, Dale, was a Hobart Football Club premiership player in 1990 Tasmanian Football League and was drafted by the Sydney Swans in the 1990 AFL draft as a 21-year-old. Dale played six reserves games and three Ansett Cup games in the seniors but did not play any AFL games for the Swans. While at Sydney he also played for Campbelltown in the Sydney Football League. Dale would return home to Hobart where he led the Southern Football League (Tasmania) goalkicking in 1999.

As a child Aaron grew up wanting to be an AFL player like his father. Aaron had explosive speed and showed an x-factor however despite his short stature. In grade 10 he was only 157 cm tall and during his 18th year he grew 13 cm in three months resulting in growing pains. Remarkably by the age of 19 Hall would grow to 186 cm, taller than his father Dale who was 183 cm.

Originally from the Hobart Football Club in the Tasmanian State League, the same club as his father, Hall did not play underage football for Tasmania like most AFL prospects from the state. He played alongside future AFL player Jeremy Howe in 2010.

Hall was recruited to the Gold Coast Suns as a 21-year-old in the 2012 Pre-season Draft, with pick number 7.

== AFL career ==
=== 2012 ===
Hall made his AFL debut in round 1, in 2012, against Adelaide he had 17 disposals in a 69-point loss. Hall played the first 4 games of the season as a small forward but was dropped to the NEAFL after a poor game in wet conditions vs Brisbane. Hall came in and out of the team, playing four more games for the season.

=== 2013 ===
Hall played all of Gold Coasts 22 games in 2013, he averaged 14 disposals a game and kicked 24 goals. Hall's most notable performance was a 5-goal haul vs Hawthorn.

=== 2014 ===
Hall's career stalled in 2014 as he played 16 games with stints in the NEAFL, he kicked 12 goals and averaged 13 disposals a game.

=== 2015 ===
Hall's career would come to the crossroads in 2015 after a groin surgery severely restricted his pre-season and a poor start to the season. He started the season in the NEAFL where he amassed 31 touches and two goals in a defeat. This was enough for Hall to come back in the team for Round 3 of the AFL season however Hall would have a minimal impact in round 3 and 4 then would find himself back in the Suns reserves. Once again Hall had 31 disposals in the reserves and found his way back in for round 6. Hall played rounds 4, 5 and 6 but was the sub in round 5 and was subbed out in round 6. Hall didn't even play the next two rounds in the NEAFL, he then played two more NEAFL games before a 29 possession and four goal performance in win would see him return for round 14. Hall was solid for the next 3 games kicking 5 goals but Round 17 would be the turning point in Hall's career.

In Round 17 Hall moved to the midfield as the Suns star midfielder Gary Ablett was injured in round 16. Hall took his opportunity, refusing to relinquish his position in Gold Coast's midfield. Across the final seven rounds of the season, Hall equalled or bettered his career-best possession haul on six occasions, averaging 27 possessions, 6 inside 50s and 4 clearances per game during that period. Hall's finish to the season saw him poll in six of the last seven games of the year to finish seventh in the Club Champion. His form was rewarded in September when he signed a 3-year deal with the Suns.

=== 2018 ===
At the conclusion of the 2018 season, Hall was traded to North Melbourne.

=== 2021 ===
Hall played as a rebounding defender throughout 2021, delivering his career best year. Hall’s good form was rewarded in September 2021 with a contract extension at the Kangaroos for the 2022 AFL season.

=== 2022 ===
Hall racked up his 150th AFL games during the 2022 season. In September 2022, Hall’s good season was rewarded with another one-year contract extension at the Kangaroos, to the end of the 2023 season.

=== 2023 ===
On the 2nd of August, 2023, Hall announced his retirement, after playing 161 games in the AFL.

== Statistics ==
Statistics are correct to the end of the round 3 2022

Legend
G	Goals	K	Kicks	D	Disposals	T	Tackles
B	Behinds	H	Handballs	M	Marks

Season	Team	No.	Games	Totals							Averages (per game)							Votes
Season	Team	No.	Games	G	B	K	H	D	M	T	G	B	K	H	D	M	T	Votes
2012	Gold Coast	33	8	8	5	65	36	101	24	29	1.0	0.6	8.1	4.5	12.6	3.0	3.6	1
2013	Gold Coast	33	22	24	27	214	100	314	73	66	1.1	1.2	9.7	4.5	14.3	3.3	3.0	0
2014	Gold Coast	33	16	12	10	120	90	210	39	55	0.8	0.6	7.5	5.6	13.1	2.4	3.4	0
2015	Gold Coast	33	15	11	7	183	107	290	45	48	0.7	0.5	12.2	7.1	19.3	3.0	3.2	5
2016	Gold Coast	33	17	8	17	293	180	473	79	63	0.5	1.0	17.2	10.6	27.8	4.6	3.7	11
2017	Gold Coast	33	19	12	11	290	197	487	88	68	0.6	0.6	15.3	10.4	25.7	4.6	3.6	10
2018	Gold Coast	33	6	1	1	75	36	111	29	14	0.2	0.2	12.5	6.0	18.5	4.8	2.3	0
2019	North Melbourne	43	6	4	5	72	46	118	22	23	0.7	0.8	12.0	7.7	19.7	3.7	3.8	0
2020	North Melbourne	43	15	10	14	134	85	219	47	36	0.7	0.9	8.9	5.7	14.6	3.1	2.4	1
2021	North Melbourne	43	20	2	6	423	135	558	150	45	0.1	0.4	19.8	6.3	26.1	6.0	2.4	3
2022	North Melbourne	43	11	2	3	198	61	269	55	24	1	0	60	22	82	19	4	
2023	North Melbourne	43	2	0	0													
Career			157	94	106													

== Personal life ==
Hall has a partner, Sophia, and a young daughter and a son.
