= Trent McKenzie =

Australian rules footballer

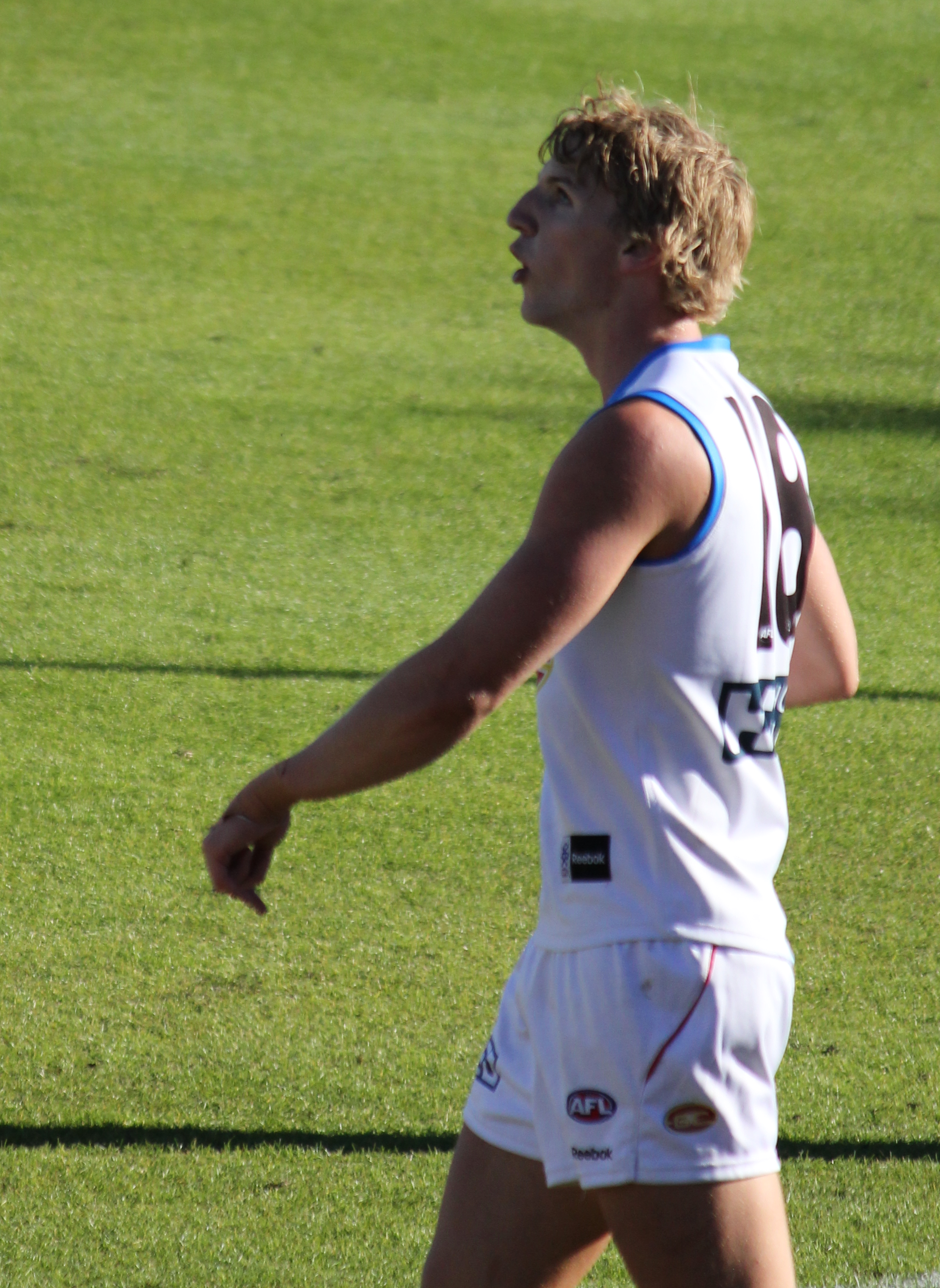
- McKenzie playing for Gold Coast in 2012

Personal information
- Full name: Trent McKenzie
- Nickname: The Cannon
- Born: 3 April 1992 (age 34)
- Original team: Western Jets (TAC Cup)
- Draft: Underage recruit, Gold Coast
- Height: 191 cm (6 ft 3 in)
- Weight: 89 kg (196 lb)
- Position: Defender

Playing career^{1}
Years	Club	Games (Goals)
2011–2017	Gold Coast	106 (22)
2018–2024	Port Adelaide	59 (1)
Total		165 (23)

International team honours^{2}
Years	Team	Games (Goals)
2011	Australia	2 (0)
- ^{1} Playing statistics correct to the end of 2024.^{2} Representative statistics correct as of 2011.

Career highlights
- Inaugural Gold Coast team; AFL Rising Star nominee: 2011; 2× 22under22 team: 2013, 2014

Trent McKenzie (born 3 April 1992) is a former professional Australian rules footballer who played for Gold Coast and Port Adelaide in the Australian Football League (AFL).

== Junior career ==
McKenzie played with the Western Jets during 2009 and also represented Vic Metro in the 2009 Under-18 National Championships. He was selected by the Gold Coast as one of twelve 17-year-olds the club could pre-list prior to the 2009 AFL draft. He spent 2010 playing for the Gold Coast in the Victorian Football League.

== AFL career ==
McKenzie made his debut in round 2, 2011 in the Gold Coast Suns inaugural AFL match against Carlton at the Gabba. In round 5, McKenzie was part of the first Gold Coast Suns victory over Port Adelaide at AAMI Stadium. After the round 17 victory over Richmond in Cairns, McKenzie was nominated for the 2011 AFL Rising Star.

His nickname "The Cannon" was attributed by the fact that he can kick 70m on the full, making him one of the longest kicks in the AFL.

He was delisted by Gold Coast at the conclusion of the 2017 season. He subsequently signed with Port Adelaide as a delisted free agent in November.

In 2020, McKenzie was able to break into the Port Adelaide side, and had an extended period in the side as the third tall defender.

McKenzie retired from the AFL at the end of the 2024 season.
