= Harley Bennell =

Australian rules footballer

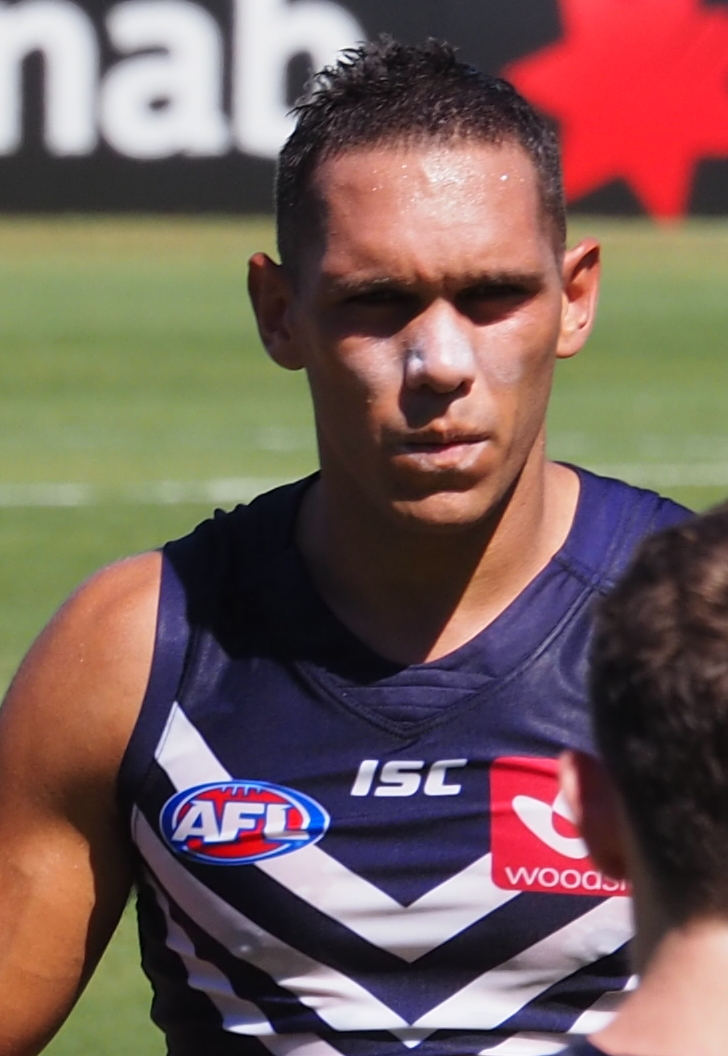
- Bennell playing for Fremantle in March 2016

Personal information
- Full name: Harley Bennell
- Born: 2 October 1992 (age 34)
- Original team: Peel Thunder (WAFL)
- Draft: No. 2, 2010 National Draft, Gold Coast
- Height: 185 cm (6 ft 1 in)
- Weight: 85 kg (187 lb)
- Position: Midfielder

Playing career^{1}
Years	Club	Games (Goals)
2011–2015	Gold Coast	81 (92)
2016–2019	Fremantle	2 (3)
2020	Melbourne	5 (3)
Total		88 (98)

Representative team honours^{2}
Years	Team	Games (Goals)
2013	Indigenous All-Stars	1 (1)
- ^{1} Playing statistics correct to the end of 2020.^{2} Representative statistics correct as of 2013.

Career highlights
- Inaugural Gold Coast AFL team; Polly Farmer Medal: 2013; 22under22 team: 2014; Larke Medal: 2010

Harley Bennell (born Harley Nannup; born 2 October 1992) is a former Australian rules footballer who last played for the Melbourne Football Club in the Australian Football League (AFL). He was drafted with the second selection in the 2010 AFL draft by the Gold Coast Football Club. Bennell was recruited from Peel Thunder Football Club which play in the West Australian Football League.

== Early life ==
Born into an indigenous family of nine children, Harley Bennell is third eldest of his siblings. He is the brother of former Collingwood Football Club rookie listed player John Bennell and the cousin of former West Coast Eagles and Melbourne player, Jamie Bennell.

== Junior football ==
Bennell began playing football competitively at the Pinjarra Junior Football Club at the age of 13. He competed in the juniors side for two years before going through the 2007 season undefeated with his team and tasted his first premiership at age 15. The following year Bennell began playing for the under 16s team at the Peel Thunder Football Club before breaking into the under 18s side and played forward predominantly. In 2009 Bennell would be named captain of his high school team at Mandurah Senior College and would go on to play several games for the Peel seniors team in the West Australian Football League at 16 years of age.

Following the 2009 season he was offered an AIS scholarship. By the start of the 2010 season Bennell had experienced a growth spurt and selectors began to take more notice of him as he solidified a spot in the Peel Thunder seniors side. During the 2010 season Bennell would also be picked for the Western Australian under 18s team that competed in the AFL Under 18 Championships, he would walk away with the Larke Medal which is awarded to the best player of the tournament. Bennell would cap off a stunning 2010 season by being picked number 2 in the 2010 AFL draft by the Gold Coast Football Club.

== AFL career ==
He made his AFL debut in Round 2, 2011 in the Gold Coast Suns inaugural AFL match against Carlton at the Gabba. Bennell was dropped for disciplinary reasons after the Gold Coast's round 3 clash. He returned to the team the following week but was again dropped two weeks later. He spent numerous weeks playing for the reserves team and returned to the seniors team for their round 11 clash against the West Coast Eagles in Perth. Bennell would then skip a compulsory training session by staying in Perth longer than allowed by the club. He was once again dropped from the team. He showed enough in the reserves to earn a recall to the seniors team in round 15 but the Suns' leadership group did not allow him back into the team for the match against Fremantle, which was also played in Perth. The following week he returned against the Sydney Swans and soon after began living with team mate Karmichael Hunt. He would not miss another game and finish the 2011 season with 14 goals from 14 games.

Bennell's 2012 season would be a stark difference to his inaugural AFL year, he would play in all 22 games of the year. He would also end the year with 25 goals and finish second in the club's best and fairest behind Gary Ablett, Jr.

Bennell was dropped from the Suns' team in May 2015 after drinking alcohol after a game despite the team agreeing to avoid alcohol for the week. In July, The Courier-Mail and Herald Sun newspapers published a photo on their front pages, allegedly showing Bennell preparing to inhale a white powder, presumed to be an illicit drug. The photo was reported taken in Launceston, Tasmania in March 2013. The photo was published just days after Bennell's former teammate and housemate, Karmichael Hunt's statement to the police, detailing Hunt's use of cocaine with unnamed Gold Coast players, was leaked to the press. Bennell was not selected to play the next game for Gold Coast. On 7 September, after a drunken altercation in Surfers Paradise, the Gold Coast Suns revealed that Bennell would be traded, and he was officially traded to the Fremantle Football Club in October.

Since the start of 2016 Bennell has had a string of soft tissue injuries to his calf, this effects his running ability and has struggled to be fit enough for the rigours of AFL football.

After four years on Fremantle's list for a total of two games, Bennell parted ways with the Dockers in June 2019. He was invited to train with a number of clubs, and was signed to Melbourne's list in February 2020 as part of the supplementary selection period (SSP).

Bennell debuted for Melbourne during the 2020 season, which was disrupted by the ongoing COVID-19 pandemic. He kicked his first goal for the club in the 17-point win over his old side, Gold Coast, in round six. In the aftermath of the match, Bennell became a target of racial vilification on Twitter, though the offensive tweet was later removed.

Bennell was suspended for the first four games of the 2021 season and fined $50,000 as he breached a COVID-19 AFL protocol and left the Gold Coast Queensland hub before the final game of the 2020 season. On 28 September, he announced his retirement.

== Representative football ==
Bennell made his representative debut for the Indigenous All-Stars in 2013 against Richmond. He was named man of the match and received the Polly Farmer Medal for his efforts.

== Statistics ==
Statistics are correct to the end of round 7, 2020

Legend
G	Goals	K	Kicks	D	Disposals	T	Tackles
B	Behinds	H	Handballs	M	Marks

Season	Team	No.	Games	Totals							Averages (per game)						
Season	Team	No.	Games	G	B	K	H	D	M	T	G	B	K	H	D	M	T
2011	Gold Coast	37	14	14	16	111	135	246	41	33	1.0	1.1	7.9	9.6	17.6	2.9	2.4
2012	Gold Coast	11	22	25	18	273	248	521	72	48	1.1	0.8	12.4	11.3	23.7	3.3	2.2
2013	Gold Coast	11	15	19	18	198	142	340	55	31	1.3	1.2	13.2	9.5	22.7	3.7	2.1
2014	Gold Coast	11	15	23	16	185	136	321	67	29	1.5	1.1	12.3	9.1	21.4	4.5	1.9
2015	Gold Coast	11	15	11	15	225	128	353	55	55	0.7	1.0	15.0	8.5	23.5	3.7	3.7
2016	Fremantle	13	0	—	—	—	—	—	—	—	—	—	—	—	—	—	—
2017	Fremantle	13	2	3	1	14	5	19	5	3	1.5	0.5	7.0	2.5	9.5	2.5	1.5
2018	Fremantle	13	0	—	—	—	—	—	—	—	—	—	—	—	—	—	—
2019	Fremantle	13	0	—	—	—	—	—	—	—	—	—	—	—	—	—	—
2020	Melbourne	17	3	2	1	18	20	38	6	1	0.7	0.3	6.0	6.7	12.7	2.0	0.3
Career			86	97	85	1024	814	1838	301	200	1.1	1.0	11.9	9.5	21.4	3.5	2.3

Did not play in 2016, 2018 and 2019 due to injury
