= Clay Cameron =

Australian rules footballer (born 1994)

Personal information
- Full name: Clay Cameron
- Born: 27 May 1994 (age 32); Brisbane, Queensland
- Original team: Mount Gravatt (NEAFL)
- Draft: No. 58, 2012 national draft
- Height: 190 cm (6 ft 3 in)
- Weight: 86 kg (190 lb)
- Position: Defender

Playing career^{1}
Years	Club	Games (Goals)
2013–2016	Gold Coast	23 (5)
- ^{1} Playing statistics correct to the end of 2016.

Career highlights
- SANFL premiership player: 2021

Clay Cameron (born 27 May 1994) is a former professional Australian rules footballer who played for the Gold Coast Football Club in the Australian Football League (AFL).

== Early life ==
Cameron was born and raised in Brisbane, where he attended Redeemer Lutheran College. He first played sport at six years of age when he joined Little Athletics and would later become a hot prospect in the track and field. In 2004-05 he would pick up two national titles in Discus but gave athletics away two years later to focus on football. Cameron grew up supporting the Geelong Cats.

== Junior football ==
Cameron played his junior football at the Mount Gravatt Australian Football Club from the under 10s level. He progressed through the junior ranks at Mount Gravatt and was voted the second best player at the 2009 Australian Under-15 Schoolboys Championships before falling victim to osteitis pubis which kept him sidelined for the entire 2010 season. He returned in 2011 to solidify a place in the under 18 Queensland team and the Mount Gravatt seniors as a key forward. Cameron continued with his ways in the 2012 season before being told he would be taken by the Gold Coast Suns in the 2012 AFL draft as a Queensland zone selection. He was taken with the 58th pick in the draft.

== AFL career ==
Cameron made his AFL debut against Richmond in round 1 of the 2014 season. At the conclusion of the 2016 season, he was delisted by Gold Coast.

== Statistics ==
Legend
G	Goals	K	Kicks	D	Disposals	T	Tackles
B	Behinds	H	Handballs	M	Marks

Season	Team	No.	Games	Totals							Averages (per game)						
Season	Team	No.	Games	G	B	K	H	D	M	T	G	B	K	H	D	M	T
2013	Gold Coast	27	0	—	—	—	—	—	—	—	—	—	—	—	—	—	—
2014	Gold Coast	27	9	1	2	40	27	67	22	21	0.1	0.2	4.4	3.0	7.4	2.4	2.3
2015	Gold Coast	27	6	0	0	19	9	28	11	10	0.0	0.0	3.2	1.5	4.7	1.8	1.7
2016	Gold Coast	27	8	4	0	42	53	95	36	26	0.5	0.0	5.3	6.6	11.9	4.5	3.3
Career			23	5	2	101	89	190	69	57	0.2	0.1	4.4	3.9	8.3	3.0	2.5
