= Henry Schade =

Australian rules footballer

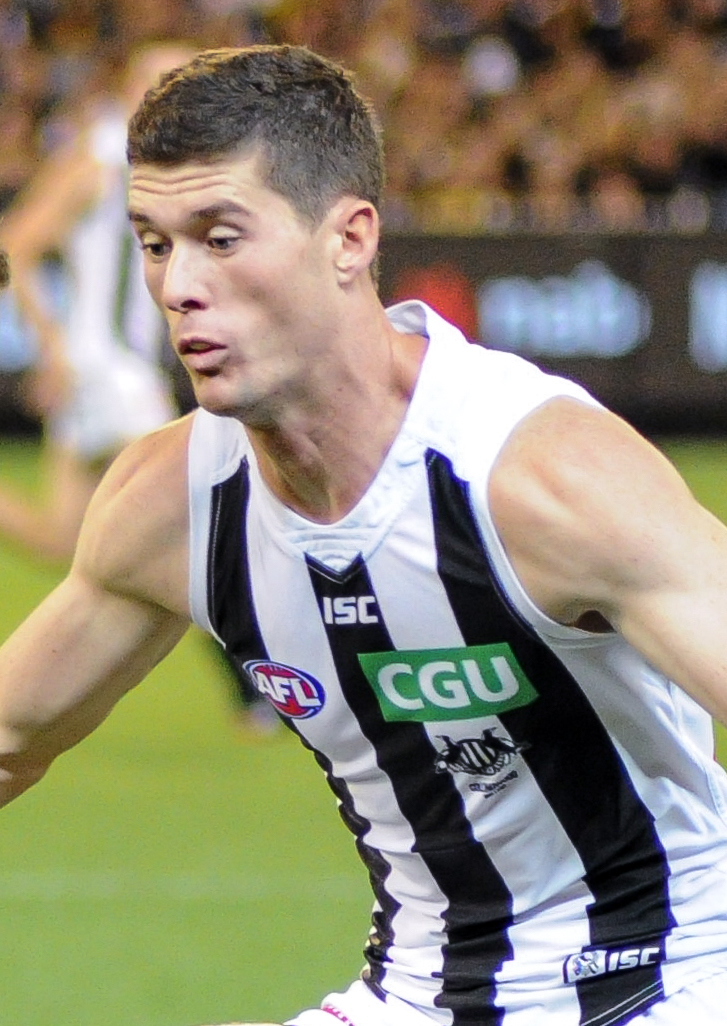
- Schade playing for Collingwood in 2017

Personal information
- Nickname: Slim Shady
- Born: 8 October 1993 (age 33)
- Original team: North Hobart (TFL)
- Draft: No. 24, 2011 national draft
- Height: 197 cm (6 ft 6 in)
- Weight: 89 kg (196 lb)
- Position: Defender

Playing career^{1}
Years	Club	Games (Goals)
2012–2016	Gold Coast	20 (0)
2017	Collingwood	8 (1)
Total		28 (1)
- ^{1} Playing statistics correct to the end of 2017.

Henry Schade (born 8 October 1993) is a former professional Australian rules footballer who played for the Gold Coast Football Club and Collingwood Football Club in the Australian Football League (AFL). He was the Gold Coast's first selection, number 24 overall, in the 2011 AFL draft. The 196 cm full-back played for the North Hobart Demons in the Tasmanian Football League.

In 2010 he represented the Tassie Mariners as an overage under-16 player at the national championships, and also played in the 2011 AFL Under 18 Championships. He was then invited to the AFL draft combine.

Schade gained his Tasmanian Certificate of Education from Guilford Young College Hobart in November 2011, days after being drafted.

Schade made his debut in Round 5 of the 2015 AFL season, in the Suns' 64-point win over the Brisbane Lions.

At the conclusion of the 2016 season, he was delisted by Gold Coast. He was subsequently drafted by Collingwood in the 2017 rookie draft.

In April 2017 Schade held Lance "Buddy" Franklin goalless in the match against Sydney.

== Statistics ==
Statistics are correct to the end of the 2016 season

Legend
G	Goals	K	Kicks	D	Disposals	T	Tackles
B	Behinds	H	Handballs	M	Marks

Season	Team	No.	Games	Totals							Averages (per game)						
Season	Team	No.	Games	G	B	K	H	D	M	T	G	B	K	H	D	M	T
2012	Gold Coast	20	0	–	–	–	–	–	–	–	–	–	–	–	–	–	–
2013	Gold Coast	20	0	–	–	–	–	–	–	–	–	–	–	–	–	–	–
2014	Gold Coast	20	0	–	–	–	–	–	–	–	–	–	–	–	–	–	–
2015	Gold Coast	20	15	0	1	85	71	156	40	24	0.0	0.1	5.7	4.7	10.4	2.7	1.6
2016	Gold Coast	20	5	0	0	37	28	65	29	7	0.0	0.0	7.4	5.6	13.0	5.8	1.4
2017	Collingwood	41	8	1	0	55	52	107	40	11	0.1	0.0	6.9	6.5	13.4	5.0	1.4
Career			28	1	1	177	151	328	109	42	0.04	0.04	6.3	5.4	11.7	3.9	1.5
