= Jesse Lonergan =

Australian rules footballer (born 1994)

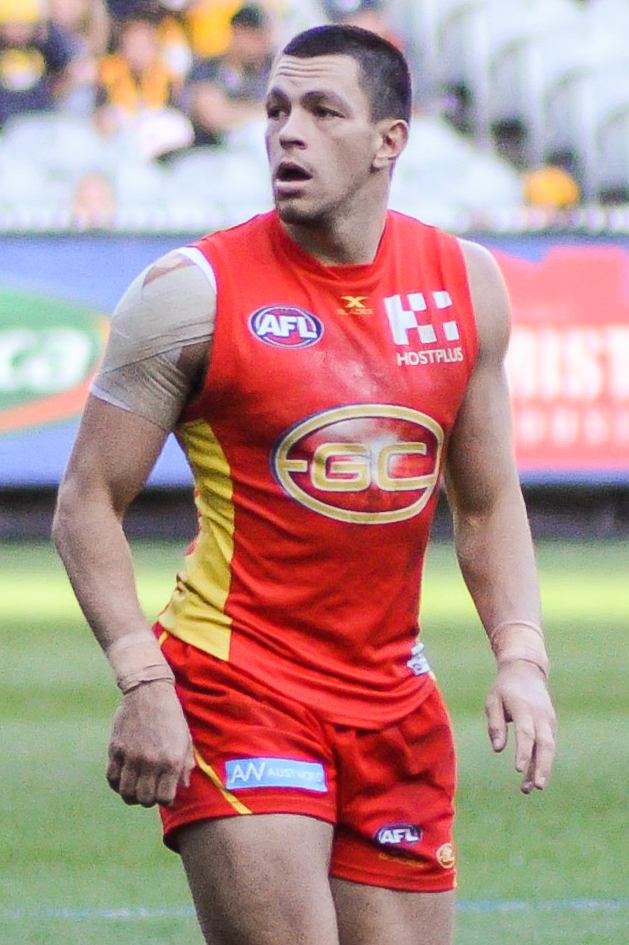
- Lonergan playing for Gold Coast in June 2017

Personal information
- Full name: Jesse Lonergan
- Born: 14 November 1994 (age 31)
- Original team: Launceston (TFL)
- Draft: No. 13, 2012 National Draft, Gold Coast
- Height: 183 cm (6 ft 0 in)
- Weight: 89 kg (196 lb)
- Position: Defender/Midfielder

Club information
- Current club: Woodville-West Torrens
- Number: 1

Playing career^{1}
Years	Club	Games (Goals)
2010–2012	Launceston	38 (12)
2013–2018	Gold Coast	60 (7)
2019–	Woodville-West Torrens	53 (16)
Total		151 (35)
- ^{1} Playing statistics correct to the end of 2023.

Career highlights
- SANFL premiership player: 2020, 2021

Jesse Lonergan (born 14 November 1994) is an Australian rules footballer who played for the Gold Coast Football Club in the Australian Football League (AFL). He was recruited by the club in the 2012 National Draft, with pick #13. He made his AFL debut in Round 6, 2013, against Fremantle at Carrara Stadium. He was delisted at the conclusion of the 2018 season.

He was recruited in 2019 by the Woodville West Torrens Football Club in the SANFL. In 2020 played in Woodville West Torrens Football Club's winning premiership team.

Originally from Launceston, he is the nephew of Sam Lonergan.
