= Tom Nicholls =

Australian rules footballer

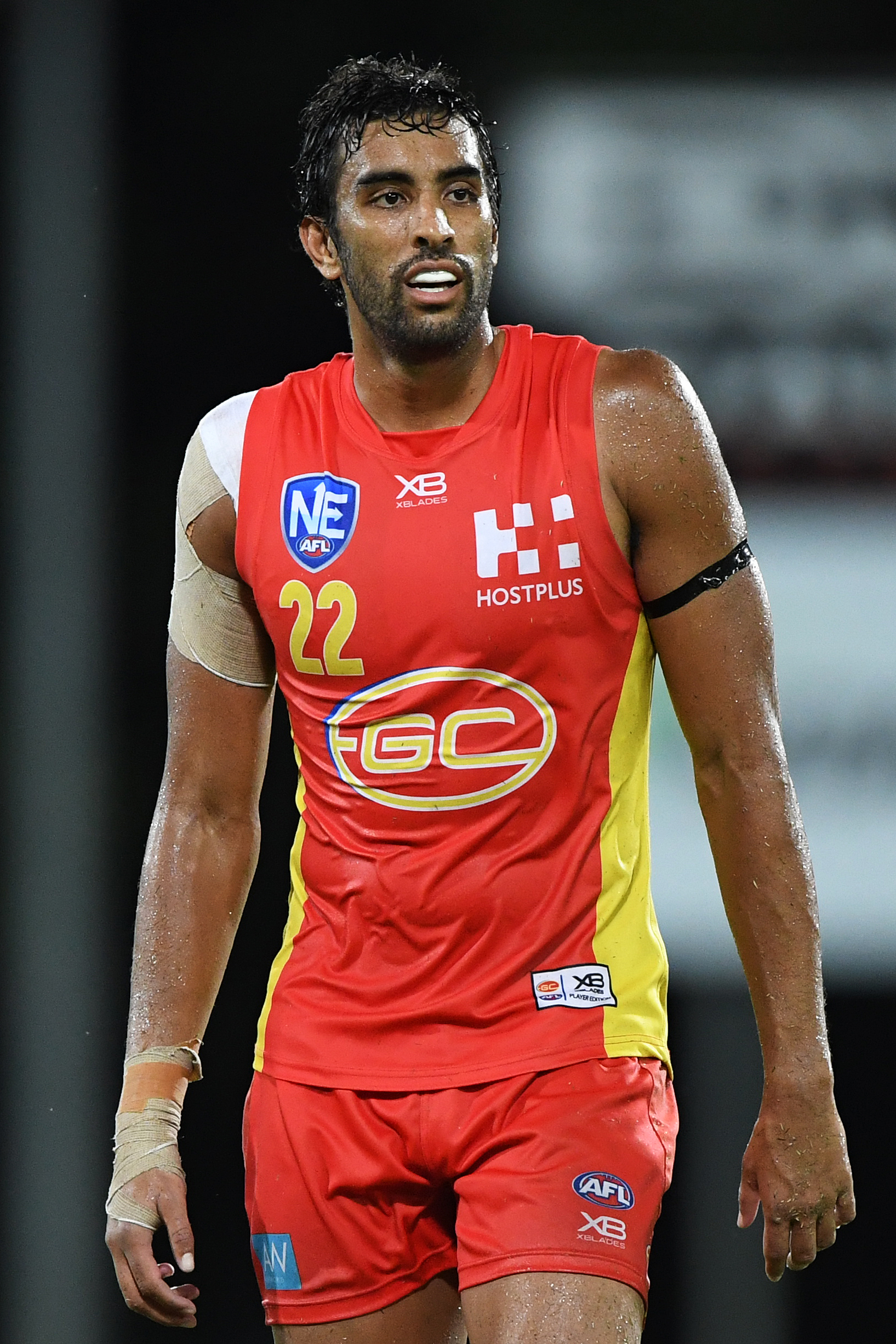
- Nicholls playing for Gold Coast in May 2019

Personal information
- Full name: Tom Nicholls
- Born: 4 March 1992 (age 34); Yarrawonga, Victoria
- Original team: Sandringham Dragons (TAC Cup)
- Draft: Underage recruit, Gold Coast
- Height: 203 cm (6 ft 8 in)
- Weight: 102 kg (225 lb)
- Position: Ruckman

Club information
- Current club: Gold Coast
- Number: 22

Playing career^{1}
Years	Club	Games (Goals)
2011–2019	Gold Coast	45 (7)
- ^{1} Playing statistics correct to the end of 2018.

Career highlights
- 22under22 team: 2013; AFL Rising Star nominee: 2013

Tom Nicholls is a former professional Australian rules footballer who plays for the Gold Coast Football Club in the Australian Football League (AFL). He was one of the club's underage recruits, and played in the Gold Coast's first season. Nicholls made his debut in Round 8 of the 2011 AFL season, against Adelaide. During that game he played against his girlfriend's brother, Kurt Tippett.

== Early life ==
Nicholls was born in Yarrawonga in country Victoria to a Fijian mother and an Australian father, he later moved to Melbourne. He completed his high school studies at St Bede's College and St Kevin's College in Melbourne. He completed his final year of school at All Saints Anglican in Gold Coast

== Junior football ==
Nicholls played his junior football for the Cheltenham Junior Football Club in Melbourne. He later moved to the Sandringham Dragons in the TAC Cup for the 2009 season. At the completion of the 2009 season, Nicholls signed for the newly formed GC17 team that would compete in the VFL for the 2010 season.

== AFL career ==
Nicholls made his AFL debut for the Gold Coast Suns against the Adelaide Crows in Round 8 of the 2011 AFL season. A knee injury kept him out of the team for the rest of the 2011 season.

Nicholls was the Round 16 nomination for the 2013 AFL Rising Star award.

He was selected as the ruckman in the AFL Players' Association's inaugural 22under22 team.
