= List of AFL debuts in 2020 =

This is a list of players in the Australian Football League (AFL) who have either made their AFL debut or played for a new club during the 2020 AFL season.

== Summary ==
Summary of debuts in 2020
Club	AFL debuts	Change of club
Adelaide	9	3
Brisbane Lions	6	3
Carlton	4	4
Collingwood	6	1
Essendon	3	4
Fremantle	6	2
Geelong	2	2
Gold Coast	7	2
Greater Western Sydney	6	1
Hawthorn	5	5
Melbourne	4	4
North Melbourne	4	2
Port Adelaide	2	1
Richmond	2	0
St Kilda	3	6
Sydney	7	3
West Coast	6	2
Western Bulldogs	5	2
Total	87	47

== AFL debuts ==
Name	Club	Age at debut	Debut round	Notes
Ben Cavarra	Western Bulldogs	24 years, 91 days	1	Pick 45, 2018 national draft
Tyler Brown	Collingwood	20 years, 102 days	1	Pick 50, 2017 national draft, son of Gavin Brown
Sam Sturt	Fremantle	19 years, 314 days	1	Pick 17, 2018 national draft
Fischer McAsey	Adelaide	19 years, 13 days	1	Pick 6, 2019 national draft, son of Chris McAsey
Tom Green	Greater Western Sydney	19 years, 58 days	1	Pick 10, 2019 national draft, (Academy selection)
Noah Anderson	Gold Coast	19 years, 33 days	1	Pick 2, 2019 national draft, son of Dean Anderson
Connor Budarick	Gold Coast	18 years, 350 days	1	Pick 20, 2020 rookie draft, (Academy selection)
Matt Rowell	Gold Coast	18 years, 264 days	1	Pick 1, 2019 national draft
Mitch Georgiades	Port Adelaide	18 years, 175 days	1	Pick 18, 2019 national draft
Max King	St Kilda	19 years, 259 days	1	Pick 4, 2018 national draft
Deven Robertson	Brisbane Lions	18 years, 266 days	1	Pick 22, 2019 national draft
Toby Bedford	Melbourne	19 years, 300 days	1	Pick 75, 2018 national draft
Kysaiah Pickett	Melbourne	18 years, 294 days	1	Pick 19, 2019 national draft
Hayden Young	Fremantle	18 years, 63 days	2	Pick 7, 2019 national draft
Tom Berry	Brisbane Lions	19 years, 43 days	2	Pick 36, 2018 national draft
Trent Rivers	Melbourne	18 years, 319 days	2	Pick 32, 2019 national draft
Luke Jackson	Melbourne	18 years, 258 days	2	Pick 3, 2019 national draft
Ned McHenry	Adelaide	19 years, 336 days	2	Pick 16, 2018 national draft
Laitham Vandermeer	Western Bulldogs	21 years, 132 days	2	Pick 37, 2018 national draft
Lachie Ash	Greater Western Sydney	18 years, 365 days	3	Pick 4, 2019 national draft
Will Hamill	Adelaide	19 years, 217 days	3	Pick 30, 2018 national draft
Louis Butler	Western Bulldogs	18 years, 304 days	4	Pick 53, 2019 national draft
Sam Philp	Carlton	18 years, 328 days	4	Pick 20, 2019 national draft
Caleb Serong	Fremantle	19 years, 139 days	4	Pick 8, 2019 national draft
Shane McAdam	Adelaide	25 years, 31 days	4	Trade, 2018 national draft
Jack Mahony	North Melbourne	18 years, 229 days	4	Pick 34, 2019 national draft
Tristan Xerri	North Melbourne	21 years, 105 days	4	Pick 72, 2017 national draft
Jake Aarts	Richmond	25 years, 210 days	5	Pick 16, 2019 rookie draft
Harry Jones	Hawthorn	21 years, 112 days	5	Pick 7, 2018 rookie draft
Will Kelly	Collingwood	19 years, 329 days	6	Pick 29, 2018 national draft
Atu Bosenavulagi	Collingwood	19 years, 297 days	6	Pick 77, 2018 national draft
Will Day	Hawthorn	19 years, 35 days	6	Pick 13, 2019 national draft
Josh Morris	Hawthorn	18 years, 246 days	6	Pick 57, 2019 national draft
Andrew McPherson	Adelaide	21 years, 21 days	6	Pick 40, 2017 national draft
Izak Rankine	Gold Coast	20 years, 79 days	6	Pick 3, 2018 national draft
Dylan Stephens	Sydney	19 years, 155 days	6	Pick 5, 2019 national draft
Chad Warner	Sydney	19 years, 54 days	6	Pick 39, 2019 national draft
Ned Cahill	Essendon	19 years, 188 days	7	Pick 56, 2019 national draft
Cody Weightman	Western Bulldogs	19 years, 184 days	7	Pick 15, 2019 national draft
Elijah Taylor	Sydney	19 years, 78 days	7	Pick 36, 2019 national draft
Michael Frederick	Fremantle	20 years, 63 days	7	Pick 61, 2019 national draft
Ryan Byrnes	St Kilda	19 years, 78 days	7	Pick 52, 2019 national draft
Callum Porter	Western Bulldogs	21 years, 152 days	8	Pick 74, 2017 national draft
Matthew Ling	Sydney	21 years, 95 days	8	Pick 14, 2017 national draft
Tobe Watson	Fremantle	21 years, 237 days	8	Pick 22, 2019 rookie draft
Brad Close	Geelong	21 years, 363 days	8	Pick 14, 2020 rookie draft
Sam Draper	Essendon	21 years, 307 days	9	Pick 1, 2017 rookie draft
Connor Ballenden	Brisbane Lions	21 years, 124 days	9	Pick 43, 2017 national draft
Kieran Strachan	Adelaide	24 years, 301 days	9	Pick 7, 2019 rookie draft
Harry Edwards	West Coast	19 years, 305 days	9	Pick 18, 2019 rookie draft
Mark Keane	Collingwood	20 years, 138 days	9	2018 Category B rookie selection (Ireland)
Boyd Woodcock	Port Adelaide	20 years, 151 days	10	Pick 32, 2020 rookie draft
Jack Payne	Brisbane Lions	20 years, 294 days	10	Pick 54, 2017 national draft
Lachlan Hosie	North Melbourne	23 years, 162 days	10	Pick 5, 2019 mid-season draft
Harry Schoenberg	Adelaide	19 years, 166 days	10	Pick 24, 2019 national draft
Lachlan Sholl	Adelaide	20 years, 151 days	10	Pick 64, 2018 national draft
Trey Ruscoe	Collingwood	18 years, 277 days	10	Pick 55, 2019 national draft
Sam Wicks	Sydney	20 years, 327 days	10	2018 Category B rookie selections, Northern Academy Zones selection
Jeremy Sharp	Gold Coast	18 years, 359 days	10	Pick 27, 2019 national draft
Xavier O'Halloran	Greater Western Sydney	20 years, 27 days	10	Pick 22, 2018 national draft
Matt Cottrell	Carlton	20 years, 163 days	11	2018 pre-season supplemental selection
Jack Bytel	St Kilda	20 years, 149 days	11	Pick 41, 2019 national draft
Sam Flanders	Gold Coast	19 years, 19 days	11	Pick 11, 2019 national draft
Zac Foot	Sydney	19 years, 233 days	12	Pick 51, 2018 national draft
Tom Hutchesson	Greater Western Sydney	25 years, 131 days	12	Pick 65, 2019 national draft
Josh Honey	Carlton	18 years, 303 days	12	Pick 3, 2020 rookie draft
Nic Reid	West Coast	24 years, 347 days	12	2019 Pre-season supplemental selection
Liam Henry	Fremantle	18 years, 360 days	13	Pick 9, 2019 national draft, (Academy selection)
Irving Mosquito	Essendon	19 years, 364 days	13	Pick 38, 2018 national draft
Jordon Butts	Adelaide	20 years, 236 days	13	Pick 39, 2019 rookie draft
Tom Fullarton	Brisbane Lions	21 years, 182 days	13	2018 Category B rookie selection (basketball)
Xavier O'Neill	West Coast	20 years, 20 days	13	Pick 28, 2018 national draft
Jake Riccardi	Greater Western Sydney	20 years, 290 days	13	Pick 51, 2019 national draft
Thomson Dow	Richmond	18 years, 316 days	14	Pick 21, 2019 national draft
Bailey Williams	West Coast	20 years, 132 days	14	Pick 35, 2018 national draft
Max Lynch	Collingwood	21 years, 358 days	15	Pick 51, 2017 rookie draft
Keidean Coleman	Brisbane Lions	20 years, 132 days	15	Pick 37, 2019 national draft
Flynn Perez	North Melbourne	19 years, 11 days	16	Pick 35, 2018 national draft
Damon Greaves	Hawthorn	20 years, 134 days	16	Pick 14, 2019 rookie draft
Matthew Owies	Carlton	23 years, 173 days	16	2018 Category B rookie selection (basketball)
Hamish Brayshaw	West Coast	22 years, 214 days	17	Pick 68, 2017 national draft, son of Mark Brayshaw, brother of Angus Brayshaw & Andrew Brayshaw
Ben Jarvis	Geelong	20 years, 46 days	17	Pick 48, 2018 national draft
Jack Buckley	Greater Western Sydney	22 years, 207 days	17	2017 Category B rookie selections, Northern Academy Zones selection, son of Ben Buckley
Finn Maginness	Hawthorn	19 years, 203 days	17	Pick 29, 2019 national draft, son of Scott Maginness
Joel Amartey	Sydney	21 years, 11 days	17	Pick 28, 2018 rookie draft
Luke Foley	West Coast	20 years, 345 days	18	Pick 31, 2018 national draft
Jy Farrar	Gold Coast	23 years, 288 days	18	Pick 60, 2019 national draft

== Change of AFL club ==
Name	Club	Age at debut	Debut round	Former clubs	Recruiting method
Jack Martin	Carlton	25 years, 50 days	1	Gold Coast	Pick 1, 2019 pre-season draft
Jack Newnes	Carlton	27 years, 24 days	1	St Kilda	2019 free agent
Josh Bruce	Western Bulldogs	27 years, 286 days	1	Greater Western Sydney, St Kilda	2019 trade
Alex Keath	Western Bulldogs	28 years, 60 days	1	Adelaide	2019 trade
Tom Cutler	Essendon	25 years, 30 days	1	Brisbane Lions	2019 trade
Jacob Townsend	Essendon	26 years, 275 days	1	Greater Western Sydney, Richmond	2019 pre-season supplemental selection
James Aish	Fremantle	24 years, 134 days	1	Brisbane Lions, Collingwood	2019 trade
Billy Frampton	Adelaide	23 years, 122 days	1	Port Adelaide	2019 trade
Kaiden Brand	Sydney	25 years, 348 days	1	Hawthorn	2019 free agent
Sam Gray	Sydney	28 years, 49 days	1	Port Adelaide	2019 free agent
Lewis Taylor	Sydney	25 years, 33 days	1	Brisbane Lions	2019 trade
Sam Jacobs	Greater Western Sydney	31 years, 346 days	1	Carlton, Adelaide	2019 trade
Hugh Greenwood	Gold Coast	28 years, 15 days	1	Adelaide	2019 trade
Brandon Ellis	Gold Coast	26 years, 231 days	1	Richmond	2019 free agent
Josh Walker	North Melbourne	27 years, 131 days	1	Geelong, Brisbane Lions	2019 free agent
Dougal Howard	St Kilda	23 years, 363 days	1	Port Adelaide	2019 trade
Zak Jones	St Kilda	25 years, 7 days	1	Sydney	2019 trade
Bradley Hill	St Kilda	26 years, 257 days	1	Hawthorn, Fremantle	2019 trade
Paddy Ryder	St Kilda	32 years, 8 days	1	Essendon, Port Adelaide	2019 trade
Dan Butler	St Kilda	23 years, 293 days	1	Richmond	2019 trade
Sam Frost	Hawthorn	26 years, 207 days	1	Greater Western Sydney, Melbourne	2019 trade
Jonathon Patton	Hawthorn	26 years, 307 days	1	Greater Western Sydney	2019 trade
Tim Kelly	West Coast	25 years, 240 days	1	Geelong	2019 trade
Ed Langdon	Melbourne	24 years, 50 days	1	Fremantle	2019 trade
Adam Tomlinson	Melbourne	26 years, 225 days	1	Greater Western Sydney	2019 free agent
Mitch Brown	Melbourne	29 years, 227 days	1	Geelong, Essendon	2019 pre-season supplemental selection
Darcy Cameron	Collingwood	24 years, 329 days	2	Sydney	2019 trade
Callum Ah Chee	Brisbane Lions	22 years, 248 days	2	Gold Coast	2019 trade
Grant Birchall	Brisbane Lions	32 years, 137 days	2	Hawthorn	2019 free agent
Harley Bennell	Melbourne	27 years, 255 days	2	Gold Coast, Fremantle	2019 pre-season supplemental selection
Marc Pittonet	Carlton	24 years, 10 days	2	Hawthorn	2019 trade
Ben Keays	Adelaide	23 years, 111 days	2	Brisbane Lions	Pick 7, 2020 rookie draft
Ben Crocker	Adelaide	23 years, 115 days	2	Collingwood	Pick 21, 2020 rookie draft
Aiden Bonar	North Melbourne	21 years, 104 days	3	Greater Western Sydney	2019 trade
Jack Steven	Geelong	30 years, 84 days	3	St Kilda	2019 trade
Cam Ellis-Yolmen	Brisbane Lions	27 years, 144 days	3	Adelaide	2019 free agent
Jamaine Jones	West Coast	21 years, 272 days	4	Geelong	2019 pre-season supplemental selection
Andrew Phillips	Essendon	29 years, 0 days	5	Greater Western Sydney, Carlton	2019 trade
Mitchell Hibberd	Essendon	23 years, 284 days	5	North Melbourne	Pick 10, 2020 rookie draft
Blake Acres	Fremantle	24 years, 278 days	6	St Kilda	2019 trade
Sam Mayes	Port Adelaide	26 years, 60 days	7	Brisbane Lions	2018 trade
Darren Minchington	Hawthorn	26 years, 223 days	7	St Kilda	2019 pre-season supplemental selection
Callum Moore	Carlton	23 years, 326 days	8	Richmond	2019 pre-season supplemental selection
Keegan Brooksby	Hawthorn	30 years, 89 days	8	Gold Coast, West Coast	2019 pre-season supplemental selection
Michael Hartley	Hawthorn	27 years, 76 days	13	Essendon	Pick 2, 2019 pre-season draft
Ryan Abbott	St Kilda	29 years, 73 days	16	Geelong	2019 free agent
Josh Jenkins	Geelong	31 years, 211 days	16	Adelaide	2019 trade

== See also ==
- List of AFL Women's debuts in 2020
