= McAsey =

McAsey is a surname. Notable people with the surname include:

- Alan McAsey (born 1937), Australian rules footballer
- Chris McAsey (born 1962), Australian rules footballer
- Chris McAsey (rower), New Zealand rower
- Darren McAsey (born 1965), Australian rules footballer
- Emily McAsey (born 1978), American politician
- Fischer McAsey (born 2001), Australian rules footballer
