= Sam Skinner =

Sam Skinner may refer to:

- Samuel K. Skinner (born 1938), American politician, lawyer, and businessman
- Sam Skinner (footballer) (born 1997), Australian rules footballer
- Sam Skinner (rugby union) (born 1995), Scottish rugby union player
