= Chris McAsey =

Australian rules footballer

Personal information
- Full name: Chris McAsey
- Born: 1962 (age 63–64)
- Original team: Ormond
- Height: 185 cm (6 ft 1 in)
- Weight: 75 kg (165 lb)

Playing career^{1}
Years	Club	Games (Goals)
1983	St Kilda	1 (0)
- ^{1} Playing statistics correct to the end of 1983.

Chris McAsey (born 1962) is a former Australian rules footballer who played with St Kilda in the Victorian Football League (VFL).

After retiring as a footballer McAsey became a journalist and writer, including for Lonely Planet, and then a digital content producer for AFL.com.au and Telstra media.

His son, Fischer McAsey was drafted in the 2019 AFL draft by Adelaide.
