= 2020 AFL Rising Star =

2020 NAB AFL Rising Star
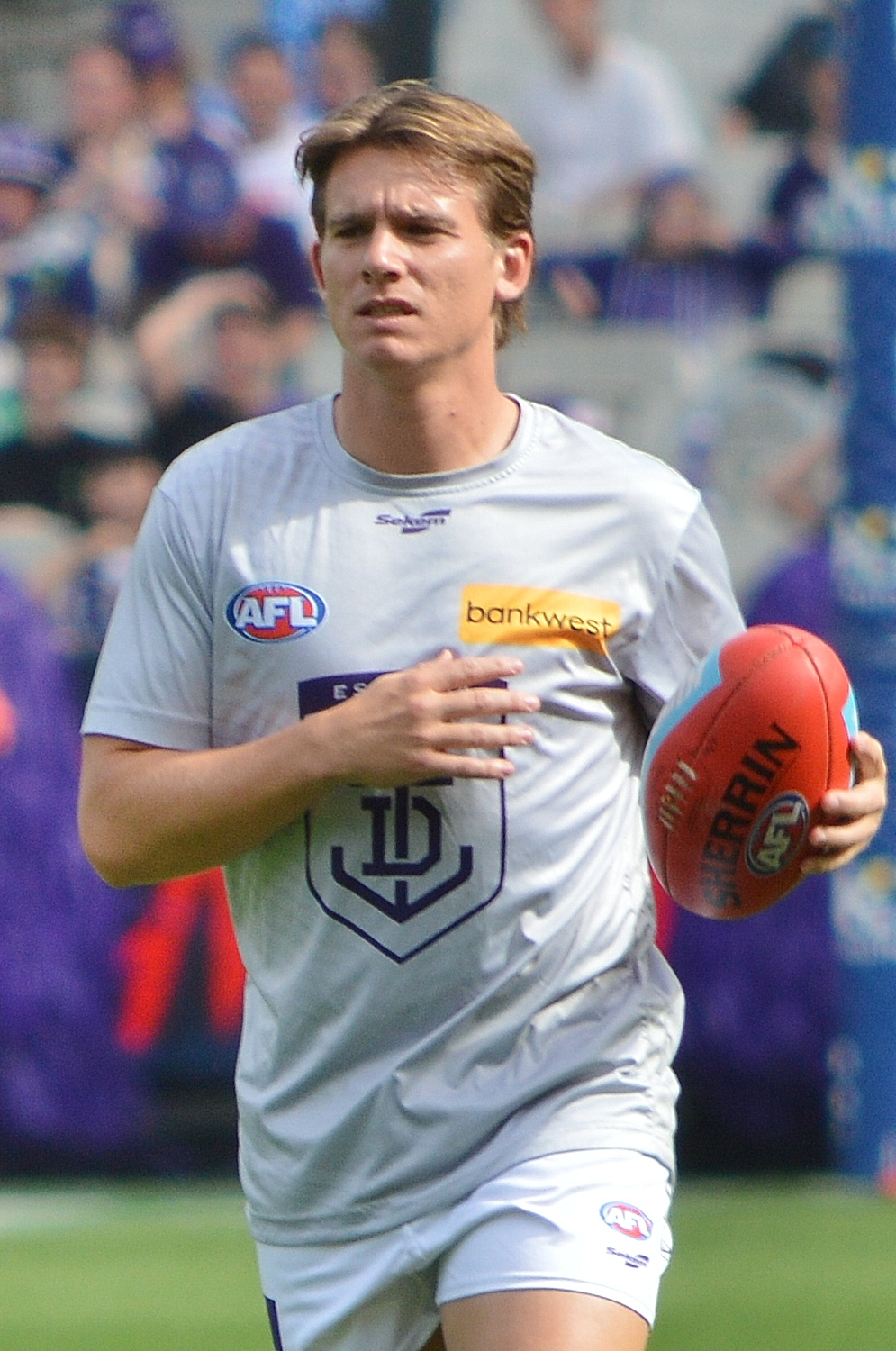
- Caleb Serong, recipient of the 2020 Rising Star award
- Sponsored by: National Australia Bank
- Country: Australia
- Ron Evans medallist: Caleb Serong (Fremantle)

The NAB AFL Rising Star award is given annually to a standout young player in the Australian Football League (AFL).

== Eligibility ==
Every round, a nomination is given to a standout young player who performed well during that particular round. To be eligible for nomination, a player must be under 21 on 1 January of that year and have played ten or fewer senior games before the start of the season; a player who is suspended may be nominated, but is not eligible to win the award.

== Nominations ==
2020 AFL Rising Star nominees
Round	Player	Club	Ref.
1	Sam Sturt	Fremantle	
2	Matt Rowell	Gold Coast	
3	Connor Budarick	Gold Coast	
4	Tom Green	Greater Western Sydney	
5	Curtis Taylor	North Melbourne	
6	Izak Rankine	Gold Coast	
7	Noah Anderson	Gold Coast	
8	Caleb Serong	Fremantle	
9	Mitch Georgiades	Port Adelaide	
10	Luke Jackson	Melbourne	
11	Kysaiah Pickett	Melbourne	
12	Max King	St Kilda	
13	Brandon Starcevich	Brisbane Lions	
14	Jake Riccardi	Greater Western Sydney	
15	Justin McInerney	Sydney	
16	Will Day	Hawthorn	
17	Isaac Quaynor	Collingwood	
18	Lachlan Sholl	Adelaide	

== Final voting ==
	Player	Club	Votes
1	Caleb Serong	Fremantle	48
2	Noah Anderson	Gold Coast	39
3	Max King	St Kilda	28
4	Izak Rankine	Gold Coast	16
5	Will Day	Hawthorn	12
6	Brandon Starcevich	Brisbane Lions	6
7	Kysaiah Pickett	Melbourne	1
