= Nick Bryan =

Australian football league player (born 2001)

Personal information
- Full name: Nick Bryan
- Born: 22 October 2001 (age 25)
- Original team: Oakleigh Chargers (NAB League) / Glen Iris
- Draft: No. 38, 2019 national draft
- Debut: 02 May 2021, Essendon vs. Carlton, at MCG
- Height: 203 cm (6 ft 8 in)
- Weight: 101 kg (223 lb)
- Position: Ruck

Club information
- Current club: Essendon
- Number: 24

Playing career^{1}
| Years | Club | Games (Goals) |
| 2020– | Essendon | 34 (4) |
- ^{1} Playing statistics correct to the end of round 22, 2026: 2024 VFL Team of the Year.

Nick Bryan (born 22 October 2001) is a professional Australian rules footballer playing for the Essendon Football Club in the Australian Football League (AFL).

== AFL career ==
Bryan was drafted by the Essendon Football Club with the 38th overall selection in the 2019 AFL draft. Having spent his first season developing in the reserves, he made his debut in round 7, 2021, against Carlton.

Bryan played only 19 games across his first five seasons in the AFL due to injury and developing in the VFL; however, he won Essendon's VFL best and fairest award in 2021, and he was named in the VFL team of the year in 2024. Bryan started the 2025 AFL season alongside Sam Draper as Essendon's first-choice ruck pairing. However, in round 5, Bryan suffered a ruptured ACL ruling him out for the season. Whilst rehabilitating from his injury, Bryan signed a two-year contract extension to remain at Essendon until the end of 2027.

== Statistics ==
Updated to the end of round 22, 2026.

Legend
| G | Goals | K | Kicks | D | Disposals | T | Tackles |
| B | Behinds | H | Handballs | M | Marks | H/O | Hit-outs |

| Season | Team | No. | Games | Totals | | | | | | | | Averages (per game) | | | | | | | | Votes |
| Season | Team | No. | Games | G | B | K | H | D | M | T | H/O | G | B | K | H | D | M | T | H/O | Votes |
|---|---|---|---|---|---|---|---|---|---|---|---|---|---|---|---|---|---|---|---|---|
| 2020 (Note: The 2020 season was played with 17 home-and-away matches per team (down from 22) and 16-minute quarters with time on (down from 20-minute quarters with time on) due to the impact of the COVID-19 pandemic.) | Essendon | 24 | 0 | — | — | — | — | — | — | — | — | — | — | — | — | — | — | — | — | 0 |
| 2021 | Essendon | 24 | 1 | 0 | 0 | 5 | 7 | 12 | 3 | 3 | 18 | 0.0 | 0.0 | 5.0 | 7.0 | 12.0 | 3.0 | 3.0 | 18.0 | 0 |
| 2022 | Essendon | 24 | 5 | 1 | 1 | 24 | 11 | 35 | 9 | 13 | 51 | 0.2 | 0.2 | 4.8 | 2.2 | 7.0 | 1.8 | 2.6 | 10.2 | 0 |
| 2023 | Essendon | 24 | 8 | 1 | 2 | 43 | 29 | 72 | 20 | 11 | 141 | 0.1 | 0.3 | 5.4 | 3.6 | 9.0 | 2.5 | 1.4 | 17.6 | 0 |
| 2024 | Essendon | 24 | 5 | 0 | 0 | 34 | 27 | 61 | 11 | 15 | 103 | 0.0 | 0.0 | 6.8 | 5.4 | 12.2 | 2.2 | 3.0 | 20.6 | 0 |
| 2025 | Essendon | 24 | 4 | 0 | 1 | 30 | 9 | 39 | 7 | 7 | 76 | 0.0 | 0.3 | 7.5 | 2.3 | 9.8 | 1.8 | 1.8 | 19.0 | 0 |
| 2026 | Essendon | 24 | 11 | 2 | 0 | 55 | 59 | 114 | 17 | 24 | 268 | 0.2 | 0.0 | 5.0 | 5.4 | 10.4 | 1.5 | 2.2 | 24.4 | 0 |
| Career | | | 34 | 4 | 4 | 191 | 142 | 333 | 67 | 73 | 657 | 0.1 | 0.1 | 5.6 | 4.2 | 9.8 | 2.0 | 2.1 | 19.3 | 0 |
