= Kysaiah Pickett =

Australian rules footballer

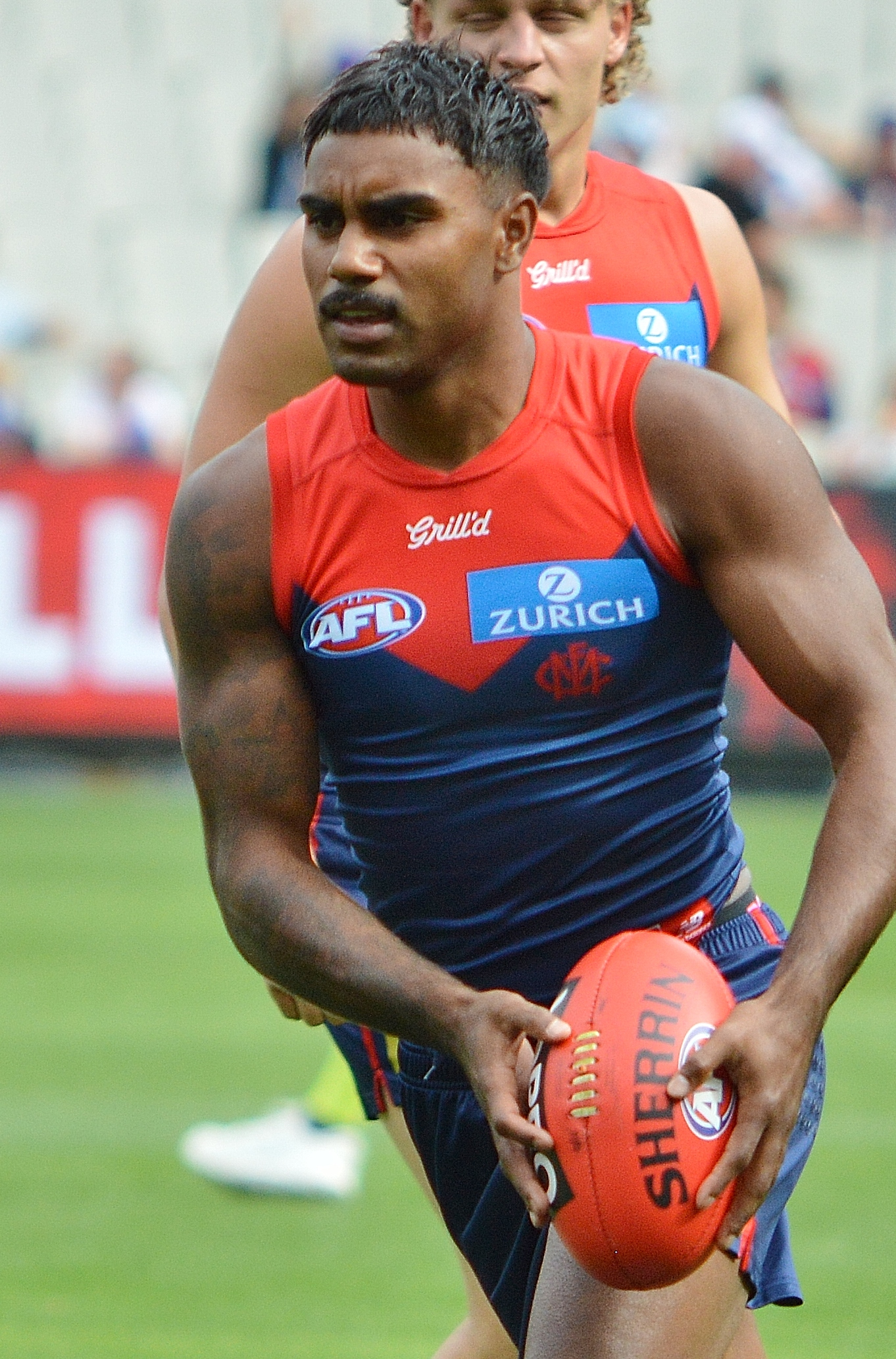
- Pickett in April 2025

Personal information
- Full name: Kysaiah Klem Paul Kropinyeri-Pickett
- Nickname: Kozzy
- Born: 2 June 2001 (age 25); Port Lincoln, South Australia
- Original teams: Woodville-West Torrens (SANFL); Port District (AdFL)
- Draft: No. 12, 2019 national draft
- Debut: Round 1, 2020, Melbourne vs. West Coast, at Perth Stadium
- Height: 171 cm (5 ft 7 in)
- Weight: 73 kg (161 lb)
- Position: Midfielder / forward

Club information
- Current club: Melbourne
- Number: 36

Playing career^{1}
Years	Club	Games (Goals)
2020–	Melbourne	147 (228)

Representative team honours^{2}
Years	Team	Games (Goals)
2025	Indigenous All-Stars	1 (1)
2026	Western Australia	1 (0)
- ^{1} Playing statistics correct to the end of round 22, 2026.^{2} Representative statistics correct as of 2026.

Career highlights
- AFL: AFL premiership player: 2021; 2× All-Australian team: 2025, 2026; 3× 22under22 team: 2021, 2022, 2023; AFL Rising Star nominee: 2020; Frank 'Checker' Hughes Medal: 2026; Neale Daniher Trophy: 2026; Melbourne: Ron Barassi Sr. Trophy (3rd B&F): 2025; Sid Anderson Memorial Trophy (Melbourne B&F Runner-Up): 2026; Harold Ball Memorial Trophy: 2021; Melbourne leading goalkicker: 2025

Kysaiah Klem Paul Kropinyeri-Pickett (/kaɪˈzeɪə/ ky-ZAY-ə; commonly known as Kozzy Pickett, born 2 June 2001) is a professional Australian rules footballer playing for the Melbourne Football Club in the Australian Football League (AFL). A midfielder and a forward, he is 1.71 metres (5 ft 7 in) tall and weighs 73 kilograms (161 lb).

Pickett is the nephew of former Demons players Neville Jetta and Byron Pickett, cousin of fellow Demon player Latrelle Pickett, and a second cousin of former Richmond player Marlion Pickett.

He was nominated for the 2020 AFL Rising Star award in round 11 of the 2020 AFL season.

== Early life ==
Pickett was born on the Eyre Peninsula in South Australia and raised in the Western Australian town of Quairading, before returning to South Australia with his uncle, former AFL player Byron Pickett. Initially, he played junior football with Port District in Largs Bay, before boarding at Prince Alfred College where he was part of the school's 1st XVIII, and was regarded as one of the most exciting players in the private school football system. Pickett played his senior football in Adelaide with Woodville-West Torrens as a small forward in 2019 and also selected in South Australia's Under-18 team. He was predicted to go high in the draft, and Melbourne, his uncle Byron's last AFL club, announced its intention to recruit him.

Pickett was selected by Melbourne with the 12th overall pick in the 2019 AFL draft, which it received from Fremantle. Pickett was the club's second pick taken by Melbourne, behind Luke Jackson.

== AFL career ==
Pickett made his AFL debut in Round 1, 2020, against West Coast at Perth Stadium. He played 14 games in his debut season earning a Rising Star nomination in round 11 following Melbourne's 57-point win over North Melbourne, when Pickett kicked a goal and had 12 possessions.

In June 2020, Pickett was suspended for one match for breaching AFL COVID-19 protocols after he and teammate Charlie Spargo travelled via an Uber to an unauthorised house for a gathering.

In 2021, Pickett played all 25 of Melbourne's games through their finals campaign. Pickett earned a premiership medal as Melbourne won the Grand Final, though he was held to four possessions and three tackles in the game.

Pickett played 23 games in 2022 for Melbourne kicking 41 goals, missing only Melbourne's round 7 game against Hawthorn due to Health and Safety protocols. In 2023, Pickett kicked four goals in Melbourne's opening game of the season against the Western Bulldogs, but was suspended two games for a high bump on Bulldogs player Bailey Smith.

In September of 2023, Pickett was handed a one-match ban by the Match Review Officer's verdict after a head-high hit on Patrick Cripps that left the superstar Carlton captain bloodied. Melbourne went on to lose that match, giving them a fourth consecutive finals loss. In 2024, Pickett received a third suspension in just over a year for head-high contact, this time against Jake Soligo of Adelaide. Prior to the 2025 season, Pickett played in the Indigenous All-Stars representative match against Fremantle. He kicked a goal in the 43-point win.

Reaching career-best form in 2025, including five goals and 24 disposals against Fremantle, rumours began to spread that Pickett would request a move to a South Australian or Western Australian club in the upcoming off-season. However, in June 2025, Pickett signed a seven-year contract extension, keeping him at the club for nine years at a reported $12.5 million salary over that period, breaking records across the league.

== Personal life ==
Pickett identifies with the Yamatji Noongar and Ngarrindjeri nations. His father Kevin Kropinyeri designed Melbourne's 2025 Sir Doug Nicholls Round guernsey using traditional Ngarrindjeri artstyles. His cousin, Latrelle also plays for Melbourne, having been drafted with pick number 12 in the 2025 national draft.

== Statistics ==
Updated to the end of round 22, 2026.

Legend
G	Goals	K	Kicks	D	Disposals	T	Tackles
B	Behinds	H	Handballs	M	Marks
#	Played in that season's premiership team

Season	Team	No.	Games	Totals							Averages (per game)							Votes
Season	Team	No.	Games	G	B	K	H	D	M	T	G	B	K	H	D	M	T	Votes
2020 (Note: The 2020 season was played with 17 home-and-away matches per team (down from 22) and 16-minute quarters with time on (down from 20-minute quarters with time on) due to the impact of the COVID-19 pandemic.)	Melbourne	36	14	7	13	62	47	109	17	35	0.5	0.9	4.4	3.4	7.8	1.2	2.5	0
2021^{#}	Melbourne	36	25	40	28	193	103	296	59	87	1.6	1.1	7.7	4.1	11.8	2.4	3.5	2
2022	Melbourne	36	23	41	18	180	59	239	55	62	1.8	0.8	7.8	2.6	10.4	2.4	2.7	4
2023	Melbourne	36	23	37	30	193	72	265	58	93	1.6	1.3	8.4	3.1	11.5	2.5	4.0	2
2024	Melbourne	36	21	36	24	202	64	266	56	75	1.7	1.1	9.6	3.0	12.7	2.7	3.6	3
2025	Melbourne	36	20	40	29	274	117	391	61	73	2.0	1.5	13.7	5.9	19.6	3.1	3.7	10
2026	Melbourne	36	21	27	16	338	135	473	65	96	1.3	0.8	16.1	6.4	22.5	3.1	4.6	0
Career			147	228	158	1442	597	2039	371	521	1.6	1.1	9.8	4.1	13.9	2.5	3.5	21

== Honours and achievements ==
Team

- AFL premiership player (Melbourne): 2021
- AFL minor premiership (Melbourne): 2021
- McClelland Trophy (Melbourne): 2021, 2023

Individual

- 2× All-Australian team: 2025, 2025
- Ron Barassi Sr. Trophy (3rd B&F): 2025
- Sid Anderson Memorial Trophy (Melbourne B&F Runner-Up): 2026
- Harold Ball Memorial Trophy: 2021
- 3× 22under22 team: 2021, 2022, 2023
- AFL Rising Star nominee: 2020
- Frank 'Checker' Hughes Medal: 2026
- Neale Daniher Trophy: 2026
