= Riley Garcia =

Australian football league player

Personal information
- Born: 30 January 2001 (age 25)
- Original teams: Swan Districts, West Australian Football League
- Draft: No. 62, 2019 AFL draft, Western Bulldogs
- Debut: 28 May 2021, Western Bulldogs vs. Melbourne, at Docklands Stadium
- Height: 177 cm (5 ft 10 in)
- Weight: 72 kg (159 lb)
- Position: Midfielder / Forward

Club information
- Current club: Western Bulldogs
- Number: 38

Playing career^{1}
Years	Club	Games (Goals)
2020–	Western Bulldogs	39 (15)
- ^{1} Playing statistics correct to the end of the 2025 season.

Riley Garcia (born 30 January 2001) is an Australian rules footballer who plays for the Western Bulldogs in the Australian Football League (AFL). He was recruited by the Western Bulldogs with the 62nd draft pick in the 2019 AFL draft.

== Early football ==
Garcia began playing football with the Caversham Suns Junior Football Club in the eastern suburbs of Perth. He was named in the 2018-2019 NAB AFL Academy squad, He played one game for Western Australia in the 2018 AFL Under 18 Championships, and soon after began playing for the Swan Districts in the West Australian Football League in 2019, where he played 3 games and averaged 12 disposals. He played for Western Australia in the 2019 AFL Under 18 Championships, being named in the team's best in all of his first 3 games, but unfortunately suffered an Anterior cruciate ligament injury in the team's championship victory, rendering him unable to play for a vast majority of the 2020 AFL season.

== AFL career ==
As a result of the injury he had suffered in 2019, Garcia was injured for the majority of the 2020 season. He completed his rehabilitation process in August 2020, and was able to participate in a scratch match against Gold Coast on 2 August 2020. Garcia did not play at senior level in 2020, and had another minor injury to his knee in December 2020 which again set him back until March 2021. Garcia made his debut for the senior team in the 11th round of the 2021 AFL season. Unfortunately for Garcia, his poor injury luck continued, suffering a concussion in the first quarter of the game, which ruled him out of the rest of the game. Garcia returned to the senior team in round 15, where he kicked his first career goal and tallied 13 disposals. It was revealed that Garcia had signed a one-year contract extension with the Bulldogs on 16 July 2021, tying him to the club until the end of the 2022 season.

== Statistics ==
Updated to the end of the 2025 season.

Legend
G	Goals	K	Kicks	D	Disposals	T	Tackles
B	Behinds	H	Handballs	M	Marks

Season	Team	No.	Games	Totals							Averages (per game)							Votes
Season	Team	No.	Games	G	B	K	H	D	M	T	G	B	K	H	D	M	T	Votes
2020 (Note: The 2020 season was played with 17 home-and-away matches per team (down from 22) and 16-minute quarters with time on (down from 20-minute quarters with time on) due to the impact of the COVID-19 pandemic.)	Western Bulldogs	38	0	—	—	—	—	—	—	—	—	—	—	—	—	—	—	0
2021	Western Bulldogs	38	9	4	3	57	46	103	14	17	0.4	0.3	6.3	5.1	11.4	1.6	1.9	0
2022	Western Bulldogs	38	7	3	1	41	35	76	10	8	0.4	0.1	5.9	5.0	10.9	1.4	1.1	0
2023	Western Bulldogs	38	3	1	0	12	19	31	2	9	0.3	0.0	4.0	6.3	10.3	0.7	3.0	0
2024	Western Bulldogs	38	12	5	7	89	98	187	17	44	0.4	0.6	7.4	8.2	15.6	1.4	3.7	0
2025	Western Bulldogs	38	8	2	4	52	61	113	11	30	0.3	0.5	6.5	7.6	14.1	1.4	3.8	0
Career			39	15	15	251	259	510	54	108	0.4	0.4	6.4	6.6	13.1	1.4	2.8	0
