= Kyle Dunkley =

Australian rules footballer

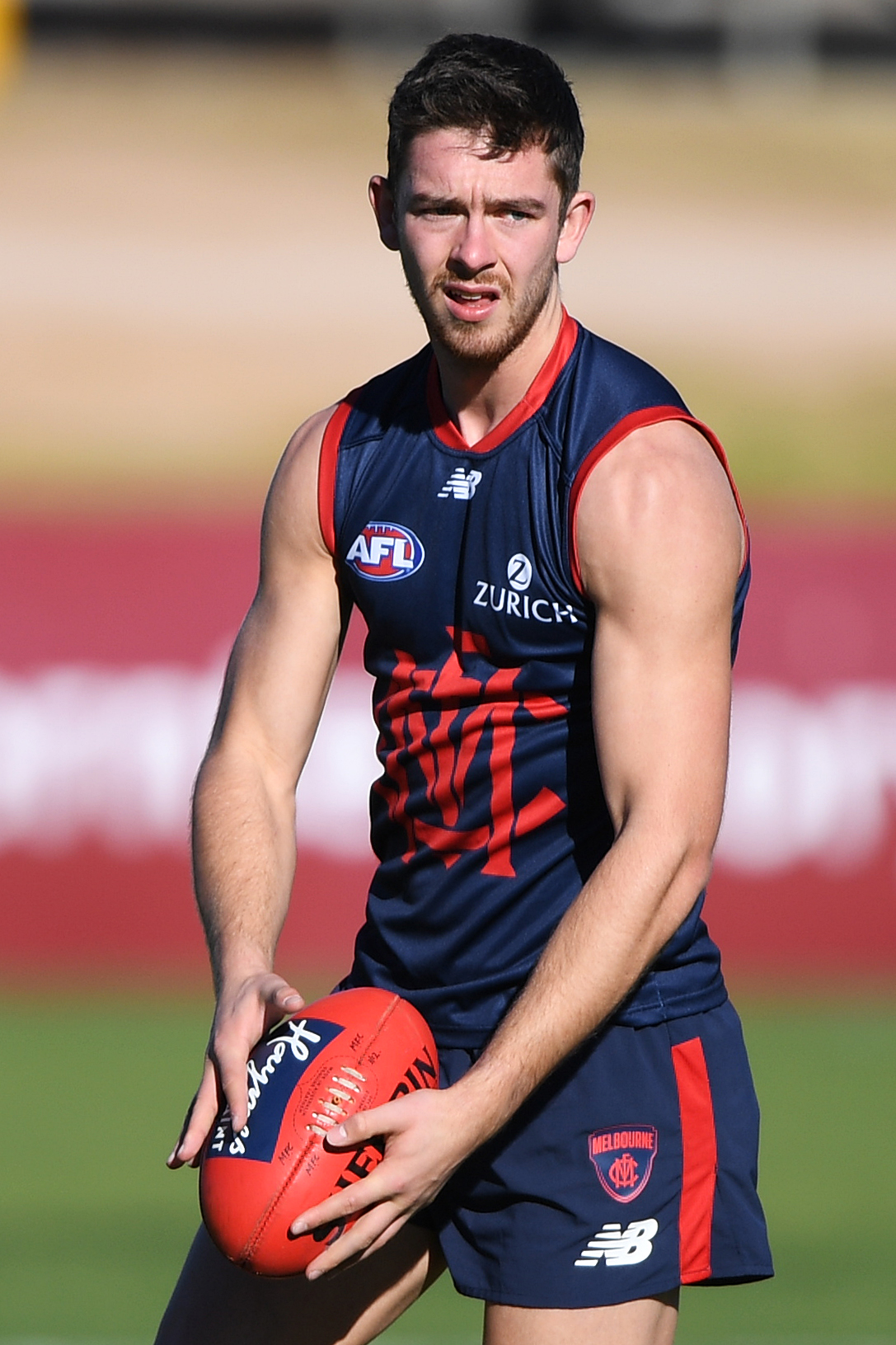
- Dunkley with Melbourne in July 2019

Personal information
- Born: 20 June 2000 (age 26)
- Original teams: Footscray VFL, Gippsland Power (NAB League)
- Draft: No. 3 in the 2019 Mid-season rookie draft
- Debut: 7 July 2019, Melbourne vs. Carlton, at MCG
- Height: 185 cm (6 ft 1 in)
- Weight: 84 kg (185 lb)

Playing career
Years	Club	Games (Goals)
2019–2020	Melbourne	5 (3)

Kyle Dunkley (born 20 June 2000) is a former professional Australian rules footballer who played for the Melbourne Football Club in the Australian Football League (AFL). He was selected in the 2019 Mid-season rookie draft. He made his senior debut against Carlton in round 16 of the 2019 season. He was delisted at the end of the 2020 season.

Dunkley is the son of Andrew Dunkley and younger brother of Josh and Lara Dunkley.

He was added to the Sydney Swans top-up list in early 2022.

He currently plays for the Brisbane Lions VFL team.

== Statistics ==
Statistics are correct to the end of the 2019 season

Legend
G	Goals	K	Kicks	D	Disposals	T	Tackles
B	Behinds	H	Handballs	M	Marks

Season	Team	No.	Games	Totals							Averages (per game)							Votes
Season	Team	No.	Games	G	B	K	H	D	M	T	G	B	K	H	D	M	T	Votes
2019	Melbourne	48	5	3	0	34	14	48	22	10	0.6	0.0	6.8	2.8	9.6	4.4	2.0	0
Career			5	3	0	34	14	48	22	10	0.6	0.0	6.8	2.8	9.6	4.4	2.0	0
