= Isaac Quaynor =

Australian rules footballer (born 2000)

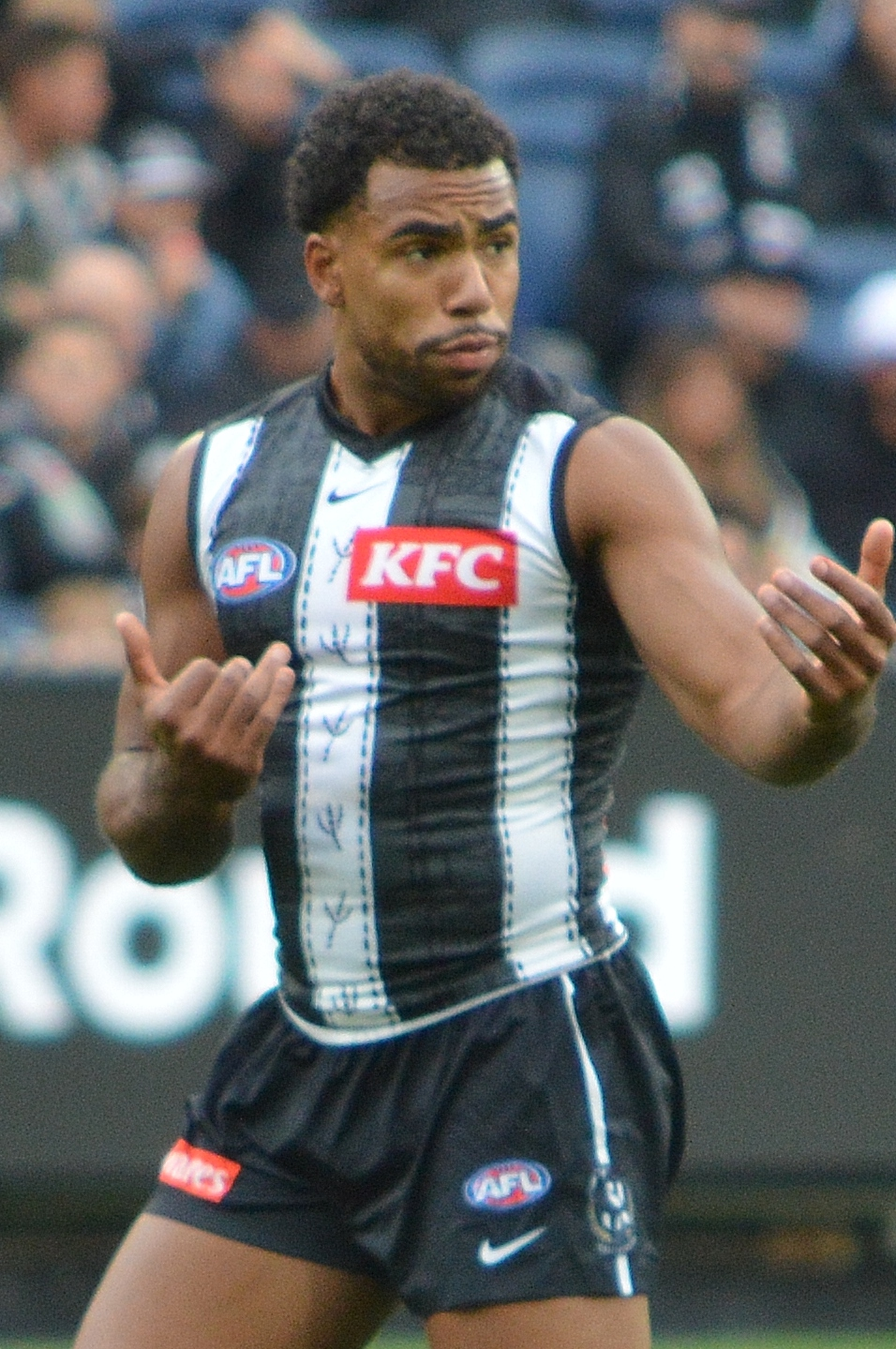
- Quaynor in May 2025

Personal information
- Full name: Isaac Quaynor
- Nicknames: Q, IQ
- Born: 15 January 2000 (age 26); Melbourne, Victoria
- Original team: Oakleigh Chargers (NAB League)
- Draft: No. 13, 2018 AFL draft, Collingwood
- Height: 180 cm (5 ft 11 in)
- Weight: 88 kg (194 lb)
- Position: Defender

Club information
- Current club: Collingwood
- Number: 3

Playing career^{1}
Years	Club	Games (Goals)
2019–	Collingwood	154 (5)
- ^{1} Playing statistics correct to the end of the 2026 season.

Career highlights
- AFL premiership player: 2023; 2x 22under22 team: 2021, 2022; 2020 AFL Rising Star: nominee

Isaac Quaynor (born 15 January 2000) is a professional Australian rules footballer who plays for the Collingwood Football Club in the Australian Football League (AFL).

== Early life ==
Quaynor participated in the Auskick program at Doncaster East. He went to Doncaster Gardens Primary School. He first played junior football with the Beverley Hills Junior Football Club where he came to know future Collingwood teammate Tom Phillips. He then joined Oakleigh Chargers, where he was coached by Anthony Phillips, Tom's father. Quaynor also played junior football for the Templestowe Football Club and for Bulleen-Templestowe Junior Football Club in the Yarra Junior Football League. In 2018, Quaynor was runner-up for Oakleigh Chargers best and fairest award, which was won by Jack Ross. He represented Vic Metro at the 2018 AFL Under 18 Championships and was selected for the All-Australian team, despite missing the match against Vic County due to a rib fracture. Quaynor played 10 games for Collingwood's Victorian Football League before his AFL debut, averaging 19.1 disposals and 3.6 tackles.

== AFL career ==
Quaynor was part of Collingwood's Next Generation Academy and won the goalkicking test at the Draft Combine. The club drafted him to their AFL squad with the 13th draft pick of the 2018 AFL draft. As Collingwood's first pick of the draft, he wore the number 35 guernsey in his first season. Quaynor made his AFL debut in Collingwood's loss against Hawthorn in the 16th round of the 2019 AFL season. In the 17th round of the 2020 AFL season, Quaynor was nominated for the AFL Rising Star award. In 2021 Quaynor became a regular player in Collingwood's lineup each week. In 2023, Quaynor was named in the initial All-Australian squad of 44 for the first time. Prior to the 2024 AFL season, Quaynor was named as part of the Collingwood leadership group, being announced as one of Collingwood's vice-captains.

On 16 August 2025, during Collingwood's round 23 match against Adelaide, Adelaide player Izak Rankine reportedly used a homophobic slur against Quaynor. The incident prompted an AFL investigation, which resulted in Rankine being suspended for four matches. Playing Adelaide at their home grounds in the 2025 AFL season 1st preliminary final later that year, while Rankine's suspension was ongoing, Quaynor was repeatedly booed by Adelaide fans. Rankine missed the opening two games of the 2026 AFL season to complete his suspension, thereby missing Collingwood's season opener against Adelaide; however, when the teams met at Adelaide Oval in round 20, Adelaide fans were once again condemned for repeatedly booing Quaynor from the outset of the match, who was coincidentally playing his 150th AFL match. In that match, Adelaide squandered a 27-point lead in the second quarter as Collingwood pulled off a 61-point turnaround to win by 34 points.

== Statistics ==
Updated to the end of round 22, 2026.

Legend
G	Goals	K	Kicks	D	Disposals	T	Tackles
B	Behinds	H	Handballs	M	Marks
#	Played in that season's premiership team

Season	Team	No.	Games	Totals							Averages (per game)							Votes
Season	Team	No.	Games	G	B	K	H	D	M	T	G	B	K	H	D	M	T	Votes
2019	Collingwood	35	4	0	0	35	23	58	18	10	0.0	0.0	8.8	5.8	14.5	4.5	2.5	0
2020 (Note: The 2020 season was played with 17 home-and-away matches per team (down from 22) and 16-minute quarters with time on (down from 20-minute quarters with time on) due to the impact of the COVID-19 pandemic.)	Collingwood	3	11	0	0	74	74	148	33	25	0.0	0.0	6.7	6.7	13.5	3.0	2.3	0
2021	Collingwood	3	20	1	2	221	140	361	95	45	0.1	0.1	11.1	7.0	18.1	4.8	2.3	0
2022	Collingwood	3	24	2	3	199	134	333	93	70	0.1	0.1	8.3	5.6	13.9	3.9	2.9	0
2023^{#}	Collingwood	3	26	0	2	250	171	421	143	68	0.0	0.1	9.6	6.6	16.2	5.5	2.6	2
2024	Collingwood	3	23	2	0	174	120	294	88	55	0.1	0.0	7.6	5.2	12.8	3.8	2.4	0
2025	Collingwood	3	25	0	0	217	134	351	121	62	0.0	0.0	8.7	5.4	14.0	4.8	2.5	0
2026	Collingwood	3	19	0	0	197	134	331	116	48	0.0	0.0	10.4	7.1	17.4	6.1	2.5	0
Career			152	5	7	1367	930	2297	707	383	0.0	0.0	9.0	6.1	15.1	4.7	2.5	2

== Honours and achievements ==
Team

- AFL Premiership Player: 2023 (Collingwood)
- AFL minor premiership: 2023 (Collingwood)

Individual

- AFL Rising Star nominee: 2020 (round 17)
- 22 Under 22 team: 2021, 2022

== Personal life ==
Quaynor was born in Melbourne and grew up in Doncaster East, supporting Collingwood since young, idolising Scott Pendlebury, and even sitting behind the Cheer Squad during the 2018 AFL Grand Final. His father, Yaw, is of Akyem Abuakwa from Ghana, where his mother, Kate, met him during a music trip. He is the oldest of six siblings and went to school at Doncaster Gardens Primary School and East Doncaster Secondary College, despite Camberwell Grammar School offering him a scholarship. Quaynor has also played soccer and basketball. He modelled his game on Western Bulldogs player Jason Johannisen and Melbourne defender Neville Jetta. During his draft year, he studied a course in sports management and leadership through Swinburne University.
