= 2019 AFL draft =

Draft for the Australian Football League

General information
- Dates: 27 May - Mid-season Draft; 27–28 November - National Draft; 29 November - Rookie Draft
- Location: Marvel Stadium
- Network: Fox Footy
- Sponsored by: National Australia Bank

Overview
- League: AFL
- First selection: Matt Rowell (Gold Coast)

The 2019 AFL draft consisted of the various periods where the 18 clubs in the Australian Football League (AFL) can trade and recruit players following the completion of the 2019 AFL season.

== Key dates ==
Table of key dates
Event	Date(s)
Mid-season rookie draft	27 May
Free agency period	Restricted and Unrestricted: 4–10 October; Delisted: 1–11 November; 13–22 November; 28 November-2 December
Trade period	Players and selections: 7–16 October; Selections only: 17 October–22 November
National draft	First round: 27 November; Second and subsequent rounds: 28 November
Rookie draft	29 November
Pre-season supplemental selection period	December - March

== Mid-season rookie draft ==
The first mid-season draft since 1993 was held after Round 10 of the 2019 AFL season on 27 May. The draft was only open to clubs with inactive players on their list and vacancies available, such as long-term injuries or retirements. Players recruited during the mid-season draft earned a contract for the remainder of the season, though had the option of negotiating terms for an extension at any period throughout the season.

Table of mid-season draft selections
Round	Pick	Player	Club	Recruited from		Pick due to
Round	Pick	Player	Club	Club	League	Pick due to
1	1	Josh Deluca	Carlton	Subiaco	WAFL	Jarrod Pickett long-term injury
1	2	Mitch Riordan	Gold Coast	Dandenong Stingrays	NAB League	Harrison Wigg long-term injury
1	3	Kyle Dunkley	Melbourne	Footscray	VFL	Aaron Nietschke long-term injury
1	4	Michael Knoll	Sydney	South Adelaide	SANFL	Kurt Tippett retirement
1	5	Lachlan Hosie	North Melbourne	Glenelg	SANFL	Ed Vickers-Willis long-term injury
1	6	Ryan Gardner	Western Bulldogs	Footscray	VFL	Liam Picken retirement
1	7	Will Snelling	Essendon	West Adelaide	SANFL	Devon Smith long-term injury
1	8	Jack Mayo	St Kilda	Subiaco	WAFL	Paddy McCartin long-term injury
1	9	Cameron Sutcliffe	Port Adelaide	Port Adelaide	SANFL	Jake Patmore long-term injury
1	10	Passed	Hawthorn	—	—	Tim Mohr long-term injury
1	11	Dillon O'Reilly	Fremantle	East Fremantle	WAFL	Matt Taberner long-term injury
1	12	Passed	Adelaide	—	—	Tom Doedee long-term injury
1	13	Marlion Pickett^{+}	Richmond	South Fremantle	WAFL	Shaun Grigg retirement
1	14	John Noble	Collingwood	West Adelaide	SANFL	Lynden Dunn long-term injury
2	15	Passed	Gold Coast	—	—	Rory Thompson long-term injury
2	16	Cody Hirst	Sydney	Eastern Ranges	NAB League	Heath Grundy retirement
2	17	Passed	Western Bulldogs	—	—	Tom Boyd retirement
2	18	Passed	Essendon	—	—	Sam Draper long-term injury

== Previous trades ==
Since 2015, clubs have been able to trade future picks in the next year's national draft during the trade period. As a result, a total of 34 selections for the 2019 draft were traded during the 2018 trade period, including (for the first time) at the 2018 National Draft, where 14 picks were traded. The selection order for each of these picks is tied to the original club's finishing position in the 2019 season.

Table of previously traded selections
Rd	Orig. Club	New Club	Acquired via	Ref
1	Brisbane Lions	Gold Coast	Pick swap	
1	Essendon	Greater Western Sydney	Dylan Shiel trade	
1	Collingwood	Brisbane Lions	Dayne Beams trade	
1	Adelaide	Carlton	Pick swap at the 2018 National Draft	
1	Carlton	Adelaide	Pick swap at the 2018 National Draft	
2	St Kilda	Sydney	Dan Hannebery trade	
2	Carlton	Adelaide	via Greater Western Sydney (Will Setterfield trade); On-traded to Adelaide (Pick swap at the 2018 National Draft)	
2	Gold Coast	Brisbane Lions	Pick swap	
2	Greater Western Sydney	Essendon	Dylan Shiel trade	
2	Sydney	West Coast	Pick swap at the 2018 National Draft	
3	Richmond	Gold Coast	Anthony Miles and Corey Ellis trade	
3	Gold Coast	Richmond	Anthony Miles and Corey Ellis trade	
3	Adelaide	Carlton	Mitch McGovern and Shane McAdam trade	
3	Fremantle	Brisbane Lions	via Port Adelaide (Pick swap); On-traded to Brisbane Lions (Sam Mayes trade)	
3	Hawthorn	Western Bulldogs	via Gold Coast (Jack Scrimshaw trade); On traded to Brisbane Lions (pick swap); On-traded to Western Bulldogs (Marcus Adams trade)	
3	Port Adelaide	Hawthorn	Chad Wingard and Ryan Burton trade	
3	West Coast	Sydney	Pick swap at the 2018 National Draft	
3	St Kilda	Western Bulldogs	via North Melbourne (Pick swap at the 2018 National Draft); On-traded to Western Bulldogs (Pick swap at the 2018 National Draft)	
4	North Melbourne	Port Adelaide	Jared Polec and Jasper Pittard trade	
4	St Kilda	West Coast	Tom Hickey trade	
4	West Coast	Carlton	via St Kilda (Tom Hickey trade); On-traded to Carlton (Pick swap at the 2018 National Draft)	
4	Gold Coast	St Kilda	via Hawthorn (Jack Scrimshaw trade); On-traded to Greater Western Sydney (Tom Scully trade); On-traded to St Kilda (Pick swap at the 2018 National Draft)	
4	Greater Western Sydney	St Kilda	(Pick swap at the 2018 National Draft)	
4	Adelaide	Port Adelaide	via Gold Coast (pick swap); On-traded to Port Adelaide (Jack Hombsch trade)	
4	Western Bulldogs	Port Adelaide	via Hawthorn (Taylor Duryea trade); On-traded to Port Adelaide (Chad Wingard and Ryan Burton trade)	
4	Fremantle	Essendon	Travis Colyer trade	
4	Carlton	Sydney	Nic Newman trade	
4	Brisbane Lions	North Melbourne	Pick swap at the 2018 National Draft	
4	Hawthorn	Collingwood	Pick swap at the 2018 National Draft	
4	Geelong	Richmond	Pick swap at the 2018 National Draft	
5	Carlton	Greater Western Sydney	via Adelaide (Mitch McGovern and Shane McAdam trade); On-traded to Greater Western Sydney (Pick swap at the 2018 National Draft)	
5	West Coast	Gold Coast	Pick swap at the 2018 National Draft	
5	Adelaide	Carlton	Pick swap at the 2018 National Draft	
5	Collingwood	Hawthorn	Pick swap at the 2018 National Draft	

== Free agency ==
2019 AFL free agency period signings
Player	Date	Free agent type	Former club	New club	Compensation	Ref
Brandon Ellis	4 October	Restricted	Richmond	Gold Coast	2nd round	
Cam Ellis-Yolmen	5 October	Unrestricted	Adelaide	Brisbane Lions	3rd round	
Adam Tomlinson	7 October	Unrestricted	Greater Western Sydney	Melbourne	End of 2nd round	
Grant Birchall	10 October	Unrestricted	Hawthorn	Brisbane Lions	None	
Wylie Buzza	1 November	Delisted	Geelong	Port Adelaide	None	
Jack Newnes	1 November	Delisted	St Kilda	Carlton	None	
Kaiden Brand	1 November	Delisted	Hawthorn	Sydney	None	
Sam Gray	1 November	Delisted	Port Adelaide	Sydney	None	
Ryan Abbott	22 November	Delisted	Geelong	St Kilda	None	
Josh Walker	29 November	Delisted	Brisbane Lions	North Melbourne	None	

== Trades ==
2019 AFL trade period
Date	No.	Player(s)	Traded from	Traded to	Traded for	Ref
9 October	1	Tim Kelly	Geelong	West Coast	Pick 14	
9 October	1	2020 third round pick (Geelong)	Geelong	West Coast	Pick 24	
9 October	1	2020 third round pick (Geelong)	Geelong	West Coast	2020 first round pick (West Coast)	
9 October	1	Pick 52	Essendon	West Coast	Pick 33	
9 October	1	Pick 37	Essendon	Geelong	Pick 57	
10 October	2	Pick 6	St Kilda	Greater Western Sydney	Pick 12	
10 October	2	Pick 59	St Kilda	Greater Western Sydney	Pick 18	
11 October	3	Sam Frost	Melbourne	Hawthorn	Pick 50	
11 October	3	Pick 42	Melbourne	Hawthorn	Pick 50	
11 October	3	Pick 61	Melbourne	Hawthorn	2020 second round pick (Hawthorn)	
11 October	3	2020 fourth round pick (Melbourne)	Melbourne	Hawthorn	2020 second round pick (Hawthorn)	
11 October	4	Ed Langdon	Fremantle	Melbourne	Pick 22	
11 October	4	Pick 26	Fremantle	Melbourne	Pick 79	
11 October	4	2020 fourth round pick (Fremantle)	Fremantle	Melbourne	2020 second round pick (Melbourne)	
11 October	5	Pick 46	Brisbane Lions	West Coast	Pick 52	
11 October	5	Pick 91	Brisbane Lions	West Coast	Pick 64	
14 October	6	Eddie Betts	Adelaide	Carlton	2020 fourth round pick (Carlton)	
15 October	7	Jonathon Patton	Greater Western Sydney	Hawthorn	2020 fourth round pick (Melbourne)	
15 October	8	Pick 8	North Melbourne	Melbourne	Pick 26	
15 October	8	Pick 8	North Melbourne	Melbourne	Pick 50	
15 October	8	Pick 8	North Melbourne	Melbourne	2020 first round pick (Melbourne)	
15 October	9	Sam Jacobs	Adelaide	Greater Western Sydney	2020 fourth round pick (GWS)	
15 October	10	Billy Frampton	Port Adelaide	Adelaide	2020 fourth round pick (GWS)	
15 October	11	Dougal Howard	Port Adelaide	St Kilda	Pick 12	
15 October	11	Paddy Ryder	Port Adelaide	St Kilda	Pick 18	
15 October	11	Pick 10	Port Adelaide	St Kilda	2020 third round pick (St Kilda)	
15 October	11	2020 fourth round pick (Port Adelaide)	Port Adelaide	St Kilda	2020 third round pick (St Kilda)	
15 October	12	Hugh Greenwood	Adelaide	Gold Coast	2020 third round pick (Gold Coast)	
15 October	12	Hugh Greenwood	Adelaide	Gold Coast	2020 fourth round pick (Gold Coast)	
15 October	13	Darcy Cameron	Sydney	Collingwood	Pick 56	
15 October	13	Pick 62	Sydney	Collingwood	Pick 56	
16 October	14	Pick 48	Carlton	Sydney	Pick 54	
16 October	14	Pick 48	Carlton	Sydney	Pick 63	
16 October	15	Zac Smith	Geelong	Gold Coast	Pick 58	
16 October	16	Lewis Taylor	Brisbane Lions	Sydney	Pick 48	
16 October	17	Jack Steven	St Kilda	Geelong	Pick 58	
16 October	18	Callum Ah Chee	Gold Coast	Brisbane Lions	2020 second round pick (Brisbane Lions)	
16 October	18	Callum Ah Chee	Gold Coast	Brisbane Lions	2020 fourth round pick (Brisbane Lions)	
16 October	19	Bradley Hill	Fremantle	St Kilda	Blake Acres	
16 October	19	Bradley Hill	Fremantle	St Kilda	Pick 10	
16 October	19	Bradley Hill	Fremantle	St Kilda	Pick 58	
16 October	19	2020 third round pick (Fremantle)	Fremantle	St Kilda	2020 second round pick (St Kilda)	
16 October	19	2020 third round pick (Fremantle)	Fremantle	St Kilda	2020 fourth round pick (St Kilda)	
16 October	20	Marc Pittonet	Hawthorn	Carlton	Pick 54	
16 October	20	Pick 61	Hawthorn	Carlton	Pick 63	
16 October	21	Andrew Phillips	Carlton	Essendon	Pick 57	
16 October	21	Pick 61	Carlton	Essendon	Pick 57	
16 October	21	Pick 72	Carlton	Essendon	Pick 70	
16 October	22	Josh Bruce	St Kilda	Western Bulldogs	Pick 32	
16 October	22	Josh Bruce	St Kilda	Western Bulldogs	Pick 51	
16 October	23	Alex Keath	Adelaide	Western Bulldogs	Pick 45	
16 October	23	2020 third round pick (Adelaide)	Adelaide	Western Bulldogs	2020 second round pick (Western Bulldogs)	
16 October	24	Tom Cutler	Brisbane Lions	Essendon	Pick 72	
16 October	24	Pick 64	Brisbane Lions	Essendon	2020 third round pick (Essendon)	
16 October	25	Zak Jones	Sydney	St Kilda	Pick 32	
16 October	25	Pick 56	Sydney	St Kilda	Pick 76	
16 October	25	2020 fourth round pick (Sydney)	Sydney	St Kilda	2020 third round pick (Fremantle)	
16 October	26	Dan Butler	Richmond	St Kilda	Pick 56	
16 October	27	Josh Jenkins	Adelaide	Geelong	Pick 37	
16 October	27	2020 third round pick (Gold Coast)	Adelaide	Geelong	Pick 37	
16 October	28	Aiden Bonar	Greater Western Sydney	North Melbourne	2020 third round pick (North Melbourne)	
16 October	28	2020 fourth round pick (Melbourne)	Greater Western Sydney	North Melbourne	2020 third round pick (North Melbourne)	
16 October	29	James Aish	Collingwood	Fremantle	2020 second round pick (St Kilda)	
16 October	29	Pick 69	Collingwood	Fremantle	2020 fourth round pick (St Kilda)	
16 October	29	2020 third round pick (Collingwood)	Collingwood	Fremantle	2020 fourth round pick (St Kilda)	
18 November	30	Pick 16	Brisbane Lions	Port Adelaide	Pick 29	
18 November	30	Pick 52	Brisbane Lions	Port Adelaide	Pick 71	
18 November	30	Pick 55	Brisbane Lions	Port Adelaide	2020 first round pick (Port Adelaide)	
18 November	30	Pick 72	Brisbane Lions	Port Adelaide	2020 first round pick (Port Adelaide)	
19 November	31	Pick 4	Adelaide	Greater Western Sydney	Pick 6	
19 November	31	Pick 4	Adelaide	Greater Western Sydney	2020 first round pick (GWS)	
20 November	32	Pick 30	Hawthorn	North Melbourne	Pick 50	
20 November	32	Pick 30	Hawthorn	North Melbourne	Pick 73	
20 November	32	Pick 30	Hawthorn	North Melbourne	2020 second round pick (North Melbourne)	
21 November	33	Pick 48	Brisbane Lions	Collingwood	2020 second round pick (Collingwood)	
21 November	33	2020 third round pick (Essendon)	Brisbane Lions	Collingwood	2020 second round pick (Collingwood)	
21 November	34	Pick 22	Fremantle	Adelaide	Pick 28	
21 November	34	2020 third round pick (Collingwood)	Fremantle	Adelaide	Pick 49	
21 November	34	2020 third round pick (Collingwood)	Fremantle	Adelaide	2020 fourth round pick (Carlton)	
21 November	35	Pick 10	Fremantle	Melbourne	Pick 8	
21 November	35	Pick 28	Fremantle	Melbourne	Pick 8	
21 November	35	2020 fourth round pick (Carlton)	Fremantle	Melbourne	Pick 8	
27 November (first round)	36	Pick 60	Greater Western Sydney	Collingwood	Pick 62	
27 November (first round)	36	Pick 60	Greater Western Sydney	Collingwood	Pick 70	
27 November (first round)	37	Pick 66	Fremantle	Port Adelaide	Pick 52	
27 November (first round)	37	2020 second round pick (Fremantle)	Fremantle	Port Adelaide	Pick 55	
27 November (first round)	38	Pick 11	Carlton	Gold Coast	Pick 17	
27 November (first round)	38	Pick 62	Carlton	Gold Coast	Pick 22	
27 November (first round)	39	Pick 20	Port Adelaide	Carlton	Pick 22	
27 November (first round)	39	Pick 20	Port Adelaide	Carlton	Pick 55	
28 November (second round)	40	Pick 22	Port Adelaide	Brisbane Lions	Pick 23	
28 November (second round)	40	2020 fourth round pick (GWS)	Port Adelaide	Brisbane Lions	2020 second round pick (Collingwood)	
28 November (second round)	41	Pick 61	Port Adelaide	Sydney	Pick 65	
28 November (second round)	41	Pick 61	Port Adelaide	Sydney	Pick 68	
28 November (second round)	42	Pick 43	Hawthorn	Collingwood	2020 third round pick (Essendon)	
28 November (second round)	43	Pick 25	Adelaide	Sydney	Pick 27	
28 November (second round)	43	2020 fourth round pick (Adelaide)	Adelaide	Sydney	2020 third round pick (Fremantle)	
28 November (second round)	44	Pick 27	Geelong	Gold Coast	Pick 64	
28 November (second round)	44	Pick 27	Geelong	Gold Coast	2020 first round priority pick (Gold Coast)	
28 November (second round)	45	Pick 30	North Melbourne	Essendon	Pick 35	
28 November (second round)	45	Pick 50	North Melbourne	Essendon	2020 second round pick (Essendon)	
28 November (second round)	46	Pick 47	Sydney	Brisbane Lions	Pick 38	
28 November (second round)	46	Pick 59	Sydney	Brisbane Lions	2020 third round pick (Brisbane Lions)	
28 November (second round)	46	2020 third round pick (Sydney)	Sydney	Brisbane Lions	2020 third round pick (Brisbane Lions)	
28 November (second round)	47	Pick 45	Richmond	Collingwood	Pick 46	
28 November (second round)	47	2020 second round pick (Richmond)	Richmond	Collingwood	2020 second round pick (St Kilda)	
28 November (second round)	48	Pick 50	Essendon	Geelong	Pick 63	
28 November (second round)	48	Pick 50	Essendon	Geelong	2020 third round pick (Gold Coast)	
28 November (second round)	48	Pick 50	Essendon	Geelong	2020 fourth round pick (Geelong)	
28 November (second round)	49	Pick 51	Collingwood	Greater Western Sydney	2020 third round pick (GWS)	
28 November (second round)	49	2020 fourth round pick (Collingwood)	Collingwood	Greater Western Sydney	2020 third round pick (GWS)	
28 November (second round)	50	Pick 61	Brisbane Lions	Fremantle	2020 fifth round pick (Fremantle)	
28 November (second round)	51	Pick 58	Essendon	West Coast	2020 fourth round pick (West Coast)	
28 November (second round)	52	Pick 62	Hawthorn	Western Bulldogs	2020 fourth round pick (Western Bulldogs)	

== Retirements and delistings ==
Table key
R	Rookie listed player
B	Category B Rookie listed player

Table of player retirements and delistings
Date	Name	Club	Status	Ref
1 February	Tomas Bugg	Carlton	Retired R	
18 February	Luke Lavender	Essendon	Retired B	
1 April	Liam Picken	Western Bulldogs	Retired	
14 May	Shaun Grigg	Richmond	Retired	
16 May	Tom Boyd	Western Bulldogs	Retired	
22 May	Heath Grundy	Sydney	Retired	
11 June	Jarrod Pickett	Carlton	Delisted	
15 July	Harley Bennell	Fremantle	Delisted	
30 July	Sam Wright	North Melbourne	Retired	
31 July	Shane Kersten	Fremantle	Delisted	
1 August	Jarrad McVeigh	Sydney	Retired	
9 August	Scott Thompson	North Melbourne	Retired	
9 August	Corey Maynard	Melbourne	Retired	
12 August	Jarryd Roughead	Hawthorn	Retired	
13 August	Aaron Sandilands	Fremantle	Retired	
14 August	Nick Smith	Sydney	Retired	
14 August	Tom Wilkinson	North Melbourne	Delisted R	
15 August	Brett Deledio	Greater Western Sydney	Retired	
15 August	Hayden Ballantyne	Fremantle	Delisted	
16 August	Dale Thomas	Carlton	Retired	
16 August	Dawson Simpson	Greater Western Sydney	Retired	
19 August	Kieren Jack	Sydney	Retired	
20 August	Jordan Lewis	Melbourne	Retired	
20 August	Andy Otten	Adelaide	Retired	
20 August	Michael Rischitelli	Gold Coast	Retired R	
20 August	David Myers	Essendon	Retired	
22 August	Richard Douglas	Adelaide	Retired	
22 August	David Armitage	St Kilda	Retired	
23 August	Alex Fasolo	Carlton	Retired	
23 August	Red Óg Murphy	North Melbourne	Retired B	
27 August	Nathan Hrovat	North Melbourne	Delisted	
27 August	Declan Watson	North Melbourne	Delisted	
27 August	Tyson Goldsack	Collingwood	Retired	
27 August	Jeff Garlett	Melbourne	Delisted	
27 August	Declan Keilty	Melbourne	Delisted	
27 August	Jack Leslie	Gold Coast	Delisted R	
27 August	Brad Scheer	Gold Coast	Delisted R	
27 August	Connor Nutting	Gold Coast	Delisted	
27 August	Mark Baguley	Essendon	Retired	
28 August	Billy Longer	St Kilda	Delisted	
28 August	Lewis Pierce	St Kilda	Delisted	
28 August	Sam Rowe	St Kilda	Delisted	
29 August	Matthew Lobbe	Carlton	Delisted	
29 August	Jarrod Garlett	Carlton	Delisted	
29 August	Pat Kerr	Carlton	Delisted	
29 August	Angus Schumacher	Carlton	Delisted	
29 August	Kym LeBois	Carlton	Delisted R	
30 August	Dale Morris	Western Bulldogs	Retired	
2 September	Matt Dea	Essendon	Retired R	
2 September	Scott Jones	Fremantle	Delisted	
2 September	Ryan Nyhuis	Fremantle	Delisted R	
15 September	Luke Hodge	Brisbane Lions	Retired	
16 September	Tim Smith	Melbourne	Retired R	
17 September	Guy Walker	Melbourne	Retired B	
17 September	Daniel Wells	Collingwood	Retired	
17 September	Sam Murray	Collingwood	Delisted R	
17 September	Chris Masten	West Coast	Delisted	
18 September	Fraser McInnes	West Coast	Delisted	
18 September	Brodie Riach	West Coast	Delisted B	
18 September	Patrick Bines	West Coast	Delisted B	
18 September	Paul Hunter	Adelaide	Delisted R	
19 September	Ben McNiece	Essendon	Delisted B	
19 September	Jordan Houlahan	Essendon	Delisted	
20 September	Maverick Weller	Richmond	Retired R	
25 September	Jordan Cunico	Geelong	Delisted	
25 September	Jamaine Jones	Geelong	Delisted R	
25 September	Jack Trengove	Port Adelaide	Delisted	
25 September	Cameron Hewett	Port Adelaide	Delisted R	
25 September	Kai Pudney	Port Adelaide	Delisted B	
30 September	Scott Selwood	Geelong	Delisted	
4 October	James Rose	Sydney	Delisted	
4 October	Durak Tucker	Sydney	Delisted R	
9 October	Tom Nicholls	Gold Coast	Retired	
10 October	Matthew Broadbent	Port Adelaide	Delisted	
10 October	Aidyn Johnson	Port Adelaide	Delisted	
17 October	Wylie Buzza	Geelong	Delisted	
17 October	Kaiden Brand	Hawthorn	Delisted	
17 October	Teia Miles	Hawthorn	Delisted	
17 October	David Mirra	Hawthorn	Delisted	
17 October	Darren Minchington	Hawthorn	Delisted	
17 October	Tim Mohr	Hawthorn	Retired R	
18 October	Ryan Schoenmakers	Hawthorn	Retired	
18 October	Bailey Rice	St Kilda	Delisted	
18 October	Brandon White	St Kilda	Delisted	
18 October	Robbie Young	St Kilda	Delisted	
18 October	Nick Robertson	Brisbane Lions	Delisted	
19 October	Ben Keays	Brisbane Lions	Delisted	
19 October	Josh Walker	Brisbane Lions	Delisted	
19 October	Ryan Bastinac	Brisbane Lions	Delisted R	
19 October	Josh Deluca	Carlton	Delisted R	
21 October	Jay Kennedy Harris	Melbourne	Delisted	
21 October	Billy Stretch	Melbourne	Delisted	
22 October	Jacob Townsend	Richmond	Delisted	
22 October	Callum Moore	Richmond	Delisted	
22 October	Connor Menadue	Richmond	Delisted	
23 October	Kurt Mutimer	West Coast	Delisted	
23 October	Matthew Allen	West Coast	Delisted	
23 October	Keegan Brooksby	West Coast	Delisted R	
23 October	Fletcher Roberts	Western Bulldogs	Delisted	
23 October	Lukas Webb	Western Bulldogs	Delisted	
24 October	Zac Clarke	Essendon	Delisted R	
24 October	Jake Long	Essendon	Delisted	
24 October	Trent Mynott	Essendon	Delisted R	
24 October	Tom Jok	Essendon	Delisted R	
25 October	Jack Newnes	St Kilda	Delisted	
25 October	Dylan Buckley	Greater Western Sydney	Delisted R	
25 October	Tom Sheridan	Greater Western Sydney	Delisted	
25 October	Jake Stein	Greater Western Sydney	Delisted B	
25 October	Zac Sproule	Greater Western Sydney	Delisted B	
25 October	Toby Pink	Sydney	Delisted R	
25 October	Cody Hirst	Sydney	Delisted R	
27 October	Paddy McCartin	St Kilda	Delisted	
28 October	Lynden Dunn	Collingwood	Delisted	
28 October	Ben Crocker	Collingwood	Delisted	
29 October	Brayden Crossley	Gold Coast	Delisted	
29 October	Aaron Young	Gold Coast	Delisted	
29 October	Josh Schoenfeld	Gold Coast	Delisted	
29 October	Harrison Wigg	Gold Coast	Delisted R	
29 October	Tom McKenzie	North Melbourne	Delisted R	
30 October	Lachie Henderson	Geelong	Delisted	
30 October	Ryan Abbott	Geelong	Delisted	
30 October	Oscar Brownless	Geelong	Delisted	
30 October	Hugh Dixon	Fremantle	Delisted	
30 October	Tom North	Fremantle	Delisted	
30 October	Daniel Menzel	Sydney	Delisted	
30 October	Jack Maibaum	Sydney	Delisted	
30 October	Josh Smith	West Coast	Delisted R	
30 October	Mitch Brown	Essendon	Delisted	
31 October	Sam Gray	Port Adelaide	Delisted	
31 October	Sam Skinner	Brisbane Lions	Delisted	
31 October	Corey Lyons	Brisbane Lions	Delisted	
31 October	Archie Smith	Brisbane Lions	Delisted	
31 October	Matt Eagles	Brisbane Lions	Delisted B	
8 November	Michael Hartley	Essendon	Delisted	
11 November	Jack Martin	Gold Coast	Delisted	
12 November	Brendon Ah Chee	West Coast	Delisted	
12 November	Hamish Brayshaw	West Coast	Delisted	
12 November	Riley Grundy	Port Adelaide	Delisted	
12 November	Boyd Woodcock	Port Adelaide	Delisted	

== Gold Coast concessions ==
Due to poor on-field results and issues with player retention, prior to the draft, the AFL announced a "rescue package" for Gold Coast which included:

- The first pick of the first round of the 2019 National Draft (pick #1).
- The first pick of the second round of the 2019 National Draft (pick #22, since traded to Carlton, then on-traded to Port Adelaide and then Brisbane Lions).
- A mid-first round pick in the 2020 AFL draft (pick #11, since traded to Geelong at the 2019 National Draft, then on-traded to GWS).
- The first pick of the second round of the 2021 AFL draft (pick #19, since traded to Fremantle).
- Darwin was added to its Academy zone
- The ability to be able to pre-list Academy players.
- An expanded Category A rookie list of up to ten players, with the club having a maximum roster of 53 players.

== 2019 national draft ==
^	Denotes player who has been inducted to the Australian Football Hall of Fame
*	Denotes player who has been a premiership player and been selected for at least one All-Australian team
^{+}	Denotes player who has been a premiership player at least once
^{x}	Denotes player who has been selected for at least one All-Australian team
^{#}	Denotes player who has never played in a VFL/AFL home and away season or finals game
^{~}	Denotes player who has been selected as Rising Star

Table of national draft selections
Rd.	Pick	Player	Club	Recruited from		Notes
Rd.	Pick	Player	Club	Club	League	Notes
Priority	1	Matt Rowell	Gold Coast	Oakleigh Chargers	NAB League	
1	2	Noah Anderson	Gold Coast	Oakleigh Chargers	NAB League	
1	3	Luke Jackson	Melbourne	East Fremantle	WAFL	
1	4	Lachlan Ash	Greater Western Sydney	Murray Bushrangers	NAB League	Traded from Adelaide; received from Carlton in 2018
1	5	Dylan Stephens	Sydney	Norwood	SANFL	
1	6	Fischer McAsey	Adelaide	Sandringham Dragons	NAB League	Traded from Greater Western Sydney; received from St Kilda
1	7	Hayden Young	Fremantle	Dandenong Stingrays	NAB League	
1	8	Caleb Serong	Fremantle	Gippsland Power	NAB League	Traded from Melbourne; received from North Melbourne
1	9	Liam Henry	Fremantle	Claremont	WAFL	Next Generation Academy selection (Indigenous), matched bid by Carlton
1	10	Tom Green	Greater Western Sydney	Canberra Demons	NEAFL	Academy selection, matched bid by Carlton
1	11	Sam Flanders	Gold Coast	Gippsland Power	NAB League	Traded from Carlton at the draft; received from Adelaide in 2018
1	12	Kysaiah Pickett	Melbourne	Woodville-West Torrens	SANFL	Traded from Fremantle; received from St Kilda; received from Port Adelaide
1	13	Will Day	Hawthorn	West Adelaide	SANFL	
1	14	Miles Bergman	Port Adelaide	Sandringham Dragons	NAB League	Traded from St Kilda; received from GWS; received from Essendon in 2018
1	15	Cody Weightman	Western Bulldogs	Dandenong Stingrays	NAB League	
1	16	Cooper Stephens	Geelong	Geelong Falcons	NAB League	Traded from West Coast
1	17	Brodie Kemp	Carlton	Bendigo Pioneers	NAB League	Traded from Gold Coast at the draft; received from Brisbane Lions in 2018
1	18	Mitch Georgiades	Port Adelaide	Subiaco	WAFL	Traded from Brisbane Lions; received from Collingwood in 2018
1	19	Sam De Koning	Geelong	Dandenong Stingrays	NAB League	
1	20	Sam Philp	Carlton	Northern Knights	NAB League	Traded from Port Adelaide at the draft; received from St Kilda; received from Greater Western Sydney
1	21	Thomson Dow	Richmond	Bendigo Pioneers	NAB League	
Priority	22	Deven Robertson	Brisbane Lions	Perth	WAFL	Traded from Port Adelaide; received from Carlton at the draft; received from Gold Coast at the draft
2	23	Dylan Williams	Port Adelaide	Oakleigh Chargers	NAB League	Traded from Brisbane Lions; received from Gold Coast in 2018
2	24	Harry Schoenberg	Adelaide	Woodville-West Torrens	SANFL	Traded from Fremantle; received from Melbourne
2	25	Jackson Mead	Port Adelaide	Woodville-West Torrens	SANFL	Father–son selection (son of Darren Mead), matched bid by Sydney
2	26	Will Gould	Sydney	Glenelg	SANFL	Traded from Adelaide at the draft; received from Carlton (via Greater Western Sydney) in 2018
2	27	Jeremy Sharp	Gold Coast	East Fremantle	WAFL	Traded from Geelong at the draft; received from West Coast; received from Sydney in 2018
2	28	Josh Worrell	Adelaide	Sandringham Dragons	NAB League	Traded from Sydney at the draft; received from St Kilda in 2018
2	29	Finn Maginness	Hawthorn	Sandringham Dragons	NAB League	Father–son selection (son of Scott Maginness), matched bid by North Melbourne
2	30	Harrison Jones	Essendon	Calder Cannons	NAB League	Traded from North Melbourne at the draft; received from Melbourne; received from Fremantle
2	31	Charlie Comben	North Melbourne	Gippsland Power	NAB League	
2	32	Trent Rivers	Melbourne	East Fremantle	WAFL	Traded from Fremantle; received from Adelaide
2	33	Brock Smith	Brisbane Lions	Gippsland Power	NAB League	Traded from Port Adelaide
2	34	Jack Mahony	North Melbourne	Sandringham Dragons	NAB League	Traded from Hawthorn
2	35	Flynn Perez	North Melbourne	Bendigo Pioneers	NAB League	Traded from Essendon at the draft
2	36	Elijah Taylor	Sydney	Perth	WAFL	Traded from St Kilda; received from Western Bulldogs
2	37	Keidean Coleman	Brisbane Lions	Brisbane Lions	NEAFL	Academy selection, matched bid by Essendon
2	38	Nick Bryan	Essendon	Oakleigh Chargers	NAB League	Traded from West Coast
2	39	Chad Warner	Sydney	East Fremantle	WAFL	
2	40	Jay Rantall	Collingwood	GWV Rebels	NAB League	
2	41	Francis Evans	Geelong	Calder Cannons	NAB League	
2	42	Ronin O'Connor	Adelaide	Claremont	WAFL	Traded from Geelong; received from Essendon; received from Greater Western Sydney in 2018
2	43	Noah Cumberland	Richmond	Brisbane Lions	NEAFL	Academy eligible for Brisbane Lions, but they did not match Richmond's bid.
2	44	Will Martyn	Richmond	Brisbane Lions	NEAFL	Academy eligible for Brisbane Lions, but they did not match Richmond's bid. Free Agency compensation pick (Ellis)
3	45	Trent Bianco	Collingwood	Oakleigh Chargers	NAB League	Traded from Richmond at the draft; received from Gold Coast in 2018
3	46	Hugo Ralphsmith	Richmond	Sandringham Dragons	NAB League	Traded from Hawthorn at the draft; received from Melbourne
3	47	Sam Ramsay	Carlton	Calder Cannons	NAB League	
3	48	Lachlan Gollant	Adelaide	Calder Cannons	NAB League	Traded from Western Bulldogs; received from St Kilda (via North Melbourne) in 2018
3	49	Callum Jamieson	West Coast	Claremont	WAFL	Traded from Brisbane Lions; received from Fremantle (via Port Adelaide) in 2018
3	50	Cameron Taheny	Geelong	Norwood	SANFL	Traded from Essendon at the draft; received from North Melbourne at the draft
3	51	Jake Riccardi	Greater Western Sydney	Werribee	VFL	Traded from Collingwood at the draft; received from Brisbane Lions; received from Sydney; received from Carlton (via Adelaide) in 2018
3	52	Ryan Byrnes	St Kilda	Sandringham Dragons	NAB League	Traded from Western Bulldogs; received from Hawthorn (via Gold Coast and Brisbane Lions) in 2018
3	53	Louis Butler	Western Bulldogs	Sandringham Dragons	NAB League	
3	54	Bigoa Nyuon	Richmond	Dandenong Stingrays	NAB League	Next Generation Academy eligible for St Kilda, but they did not match Richmond's bid. Traded from St Kilda; received from Sydney; received from Collingwood
4	55	Trey Ruscoe	Collingwood	East Fremantle	WAFL	Traded from Greater Western Sydney at the draft; originally Pick 58 ^{[a]}
4	56	Ned Cahill	Essendon	Dandenong Stingrays	NAB League	Traded from Carlton; received from Hawthorn; received from Melbourne
4	57	Josh Morris	Hawthorn	Woodville-West Torrens	SANFL	Traded from Carlton; received from Sydney
4	58	Ben Johnson	West Coast	West Perth	WAFL	Traded from Essendon at the draft; received from Brisbane Lions; received from West Coast; received from St Kilda in 2018
4	59	Jaxon Prior	Brisbane Lions	West Perth	WAFL	Traded from Port Adelaide; received from Western Bulldogs (via Hawthorn) in 2018
4	60	Jy Farrar	Gold Coast	Adelaide	SANFL	Traded from North Melbourne; received from Brisbane Lions in 2018
4	61	Michael Frederick	Fremantle	Woodville-West Torrens	SANFL	Traded from Brisbane Lions at the draft
4	62	Riley Garcia	Western Bulldogs	Swan Districts	WAFL	Traded from Hawthorn at the draft
5	63	Lachlan Johnson	Essendon	Oakleigh Chargers	NAB League	
5	64	Leo Connolly	St Kilda	Gippsland Power	NAB League	
5	65	Thomas Hutchesson	Greater Western Sydney	Adelaide	SANFL	

- ^{a} Greater Western Sydney are carrying over a points deficit from the 2018 AFL draft (Kieren Briggs selection, #34), this deficit is offset by surplus points from the 2015 AFL draft (Jacob Hopper selection, #7), moving this pick from third round (58) to fourth round (60).

=== Rookie elevations ===
Clubs were able to promote any player who was listed on their rookie list in 2019 to their 2020 primary playing list prior to the draft.

+ Table of rookie elevations
Player	Club
Lachlan Murphy	Adelaide
Mitch Hinge	Brisbane Lions
Oscar McInerney	Brisbane Lions
Max Lynch	Collingwood
Sam Draper	Essendon
Shaun McKernan	Essendon
Stefan Giro	Fremantle
Zach Guthrie	Geelong
Sam Simpson	Geelong
Oliver Hanrahan	Hawthorn
Conor Nash	Hawthorn
Cameron Zurhaar	North Melbourne
Jarrod Lienert	Port Adelaide
Peter Ladhams	Port Adelaide
Darragh Joyce	St Kilda
James Bell	Sydney
Ben Ronke	Sydney
Francis Watson	West Coast

== 2020 pre-season draft ==
The 2020 pre-season draft was held on the morning of Friday, 29 November 2019 prior to the commencement of the rookie draft.

Table of pre-season draft selections
Round	Pick	Player	Club	Recruited from		Notes
Round	Pick	Player	Club	Club	League	Notes
1	1	Jack Martin	Carlton	Gold Coast	AFL	
1	2	Michael Hartley	Hawthorn	Essendon	AFL	

== 2020 rookie draft ==
Table of rookie draft selections
Round	Pick	Player	Club	Recruited from		Notes
Round	Pick	Player	Club	Club	League	Notes
1	1	Josh Schoenfeld	Gold Coast	Gold Coast	AFL	
1	2	Passed	Melbourne	—	—	
1	3	Josh Honey	Carlton	Western Jets	NAB League	
1	4	Brady Rowles	Sydney	Bendigo Pioneers	NAB League	
1	5	Jack Bell	St Kilda	Sandringham Dragons	NAB League	
1	6	Jarvis Pina	Fremantle	Peel Thunder	WAFL	
1	7	Ben Keays	Adelaide	Brisbane Lions	AFL	
1	8	Jake Pasini	Port Adelaide	Swan Districts	WAFL	
1	9	Emerson Jeka	Hawthorn	Western Jets	NAB League	
1	10	Mitchell Hibberd	Essendon	Williamstown	VFL	
1	11	Anthony Treacy	West Coast	Claremont	WAFL	
1	12	Sam Skinner	Brisbane Lions	Brisbane Lions	AFL	
1	13	Passed	Collingwood	—	—	
1	14	Bradley Close^{+}	Geelong	Glenelg	SANFL	
1	15	Jake Stein	Greater Western Sydney	Greater Western Sydney	AFL	
2	16	Connor Budarick	Gold Coast	Gold Coast	NEAFL	Academy selection
2	17	Passed	Melbourne	—	—	
2	18	Fraser Phillips	Carlton	Gippsland Power	NAB League	
2	19	Jack Maibaum	Sydney	Sydney	AFL	
2	20	Tom North	Fremantle	Fremantle	AFL	
2	21	Ben Crocker	Adelaide	Collingwood	AFL	
2	22	Trent Burgoyne	Port Adelaide	Woodville-West Torrens	SANFL	Father–son selection (son of Peter Burgoyne)
2	23	Passed	Hawthorn	—	—	
2	24	Passed	Essendon	—	—	
2	25	Mitch O'Neill	West Coast	Tasmania Devils	NAB League	
2	26	Corey Lyons	Brisbane Lions	Brisbane Lions	AFL	
2	27	Oscar Brownless	Geelong	Geelong	AFL	
2	28	Tom Sheridan	Greater Western Sydney	Greater Western Sydney	AFL	
3	29	Matt Conroy	Gold Coast	Gold Coast	NEAFL	Academy selection
3	30	Hugh Dixon	Fremantle	Fremantle	AFL	
3	31	Passed	Adelaide	—	—	
3	32	Boyd Woodcock	Port Adelaide	Port Adelaide	AFL	
3	33	Brendon Ah Chee	West Coast	West Coast	AFL	
3	34	Archie Smith	Brisbane Lions	Brisbane Lions	AFL	
3	35	Lachie Henderson	Geelong	Geelong	AFL	
3	36	Zach Sproule	Greater Western Sydney	Greater Western Sydney	AFL	
4	37	Malcolm Rosas Jr	Gold Coast	NT Thunder	NEAFL	Academy selection
4	38	Riley Grundy	Port Adelaide	Port Adelaide	AFL	
4	39	Hamish Brayshaw	West Coast	West Coast	AFL	
4	40	Passed	Greater Western Sydney	—	—	
5	41	Passed	Gold Coast	—	—	
5	42	Passed	West Coast	—	—	

=== Category B rookie selections ===
Clubs were able to nominate category B rookies to join their club in 2020.

Table of Category B rookie selections
Name	Club	Origin	Note	Ref
Matt Eagles	Brisbane Lions	Brisbane Lions	Winner of The Recruit in 2016 (re-signed player)	
Tom Wilson	Collingwood	Sydney Kings (NBL)	3-year non-registered player (basketball)	
Ross McQuillan	Essendon	Armagh GAA	International selection (Ireland)	
Cian McBride	Essendon	Meath GAA	International selection (Ireland)	
Tom Hird	Essendon	Port Melbourne SC (NPL Victoria)	3-year non-registered player (soccer) (also the son of James Hird)	
Isaiah Butters	Fremantle	Claremont (WAFL)	Next Generation Academy selection (Indigenous)	
Leno Thomas	Fremantle	Claremont (WAFL)	Next Generation Academy selection (Indigenous)	
Luke Towey	Gold Coast	Sligo GAA	International selection (Ireland)	
Patrick Murtagh	Gold Coast	Gold Coast (NEAFL)	Queensland Academy zone selection	
Harry Pepper	Hawthorn	Gippsland Power (NAB League)	Next Generation Academy selection (Indigenous)	
Matthew McGuinness	North Melbourne	Tasmania Devils (NAB League)	Next Generation Academy selection (Indigenous)	
Barry O'Connor	Sydney	Wexford GAA	International selection (Ireland)	

=== Pre-season supplemental selection period ===
Player	Club	Recruited from		Notes	Ref
Player	Club	Club	League	Notes	Ref
Ayce Taylor	Adelaide	North Melbourne	VFL		
Callum Moore	Carlton	Richmond	AFL		
Lynden Dunn	Collingwood	Collingwood	AFL	Re-signed player	
Jacob Townsend	Essendon	Richmond	AFL		
Henry Crauford	Essendon	Norwood	SANFL		
Mitch Brown	Melbourne	Essendon	AFL		
Harley Bennell	Melbourne	Fremantle	AFL		
Keegan Brooksby	Hawthorn	West Coast	AFL		
Darren Minchington	Hawthorn	Hawthorn	AFL	Re-signed player	
Nic Reid	West Coast	West Coast	WAFL		
Jamaine Jones	West Coast	Geelong	AFL		

== See also ==
- 2019 AFL Women's draft
