= Ronin O'Connor =

Personal information
- Born: 1 February 2001 (age 25)
- Original team: Marist JFC/Claremont (WAFL)
- Draft: No. 42, 2019 national draft
- Height: 191 cm (6 ft 3 in)
- Weight: 85 kg (187 lb)
- Position: Midfielder

Playing career^{1}
Years	Club	Games (Goals)
2021	Adelaide	3 (0)
- ^{1} Playing statistics correct to the end of Round 12, 2021.

Ronin O'Connor (born 1 February 2001) is an Australian rules footballer who played for the Adelaide Football Club in the Australian Football League (AFL).

O'Connor, captain of Western Australian Football League (WAFL) club Claremont's 2019 colts premiership team, was selected by Adelaide with the 42nd pick of the 2019 national draft. He made three senior appearances for Adelaide in the 2021 AFL season, debuting against the West Coast Eagles at Optus Stadium in round nine. The following week he was an unused sub in Adelaide's one-point win over Melbourne and he made his other appearance in round 12 against Collingwood.

Delisted by Adelaide at the end of the 2021 season, O'Connor returned to Claremont and continues to play in the West Australian Football League. In 2022 he was named by Fremantle as one of the club's top-up players, who could be called up if the squad was affected by a COVID outbreak.
