= Izak Rankine =

Australian rules footballer (born 2000)

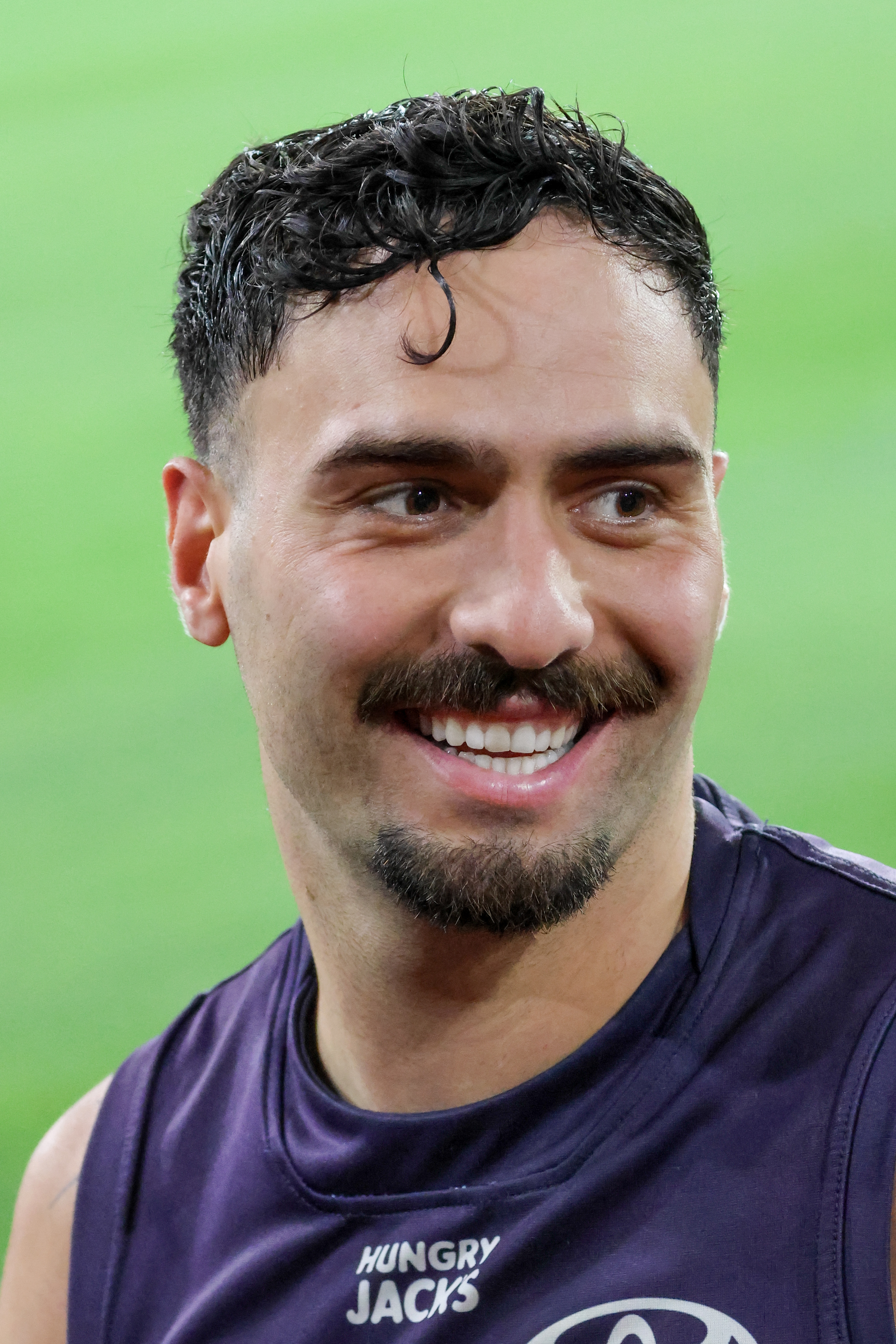
- Rankine with Adelaide in 2026

Personal information
- Full name: Izak Rankine
- Nicknames: The Magician; Ranks
- Born: 23 April 2000 (age 26); Adelaide, South Australia
- Original teams: West Adelaide (SANFL); Edwardstown (AdFL); Flinders Park (AdFL)
- Draft: No. 3, 2018 AFL draft, Gold Coast
- Debut: Round 6, 2020, Gold Coast vs. Melbourne, at Sydney Showground Stadium
- Height: 179 cm (5 ft 10 in)
- Weight: 81 kg (179 lb)
- Position: Midfielder / Small forward

Club information
- Current club: Adelaide
- Number: 23

Playing career^{1}
Years	Club	Games (Goals)
2019–2022	Gold Coast	48 (57)
2023–	Adelaide	77 (119)
Total		127 (178)

Representative team honours
Years	Team	Games (Goals)
2025	Indigenous All-Stars	1 (0)
- ^{1} Playing statistics correct to the end of the 2026 season.

Career highlights
- 2× 22under22 team: 2020, 2022; AFL Rising Star nominee: 2020 Signature

Izak Rankine (born 23 April 2000) is a professional Australian rules footballer who plays for the Adelaide Football Club in the Australian Football League (AFL), having previously been drafted to the Gold Coast Suns with pick 3 in the 2018 AFL draft.

== Early life ==
Rankine was born in Adelaide into a family of Indigenous Australian descent (Kokatha and Ngarrindjeri). He shares a relation to Australian Football Hall of Fame inductee and 1993 Brownlow Medalist Gavin Wanganeen as well as being the first cousin of former AFL player Danyle Pearce. As a child, Rankine played an array of sports which included basketball, rugby and tennis but eventually chose to focus on Australian rules football. He grew up playing junior football for Edwardstown and Flinders Park before being given the opportunity to rise through the junior ranks at SANFL club West Adelaide.

In 2016, he played his first senior SANFL game for West Adelaide at the age of 16 and kicked two goals on debut. He was later selected to represent South Australia in the 2017 and 2018 AFL Under 18 Championships where he was named in the All-Australian team both years and played a crucial role in South Australia's 2018 national championship. Rankine attended Henley High School on a sports scholarship throughout his teenage years, where he played school football alongside future Gold Coast teammate Jack Lukosius and the pair were very influential in winning the 2018 SA Schools Championship.

== AFL career ==
=== Gold Coast (2019–2022) ===
Rankine was drafted by the Gold Coast Suns with the third pick in the 2018 AFL draft. Persistent hamstring and hip injuries prevented him from making his AFL debut in 2019 but the Suns showed faith in Rankine by agreeing to a two-year contract extension which tied him to the club until the end of 2022.

Rankine made his AFL debut against Melbourne in round 6 of the 2020 AFL season and impressed with a three-goal performance, which earned him the round 6 AFL Rising Star nomination. At the conclusion of the 2022 AFL season Rankine requested a trade to Adelaide, and was traded on 10 October.

=== Adelaide (2023–present) ===
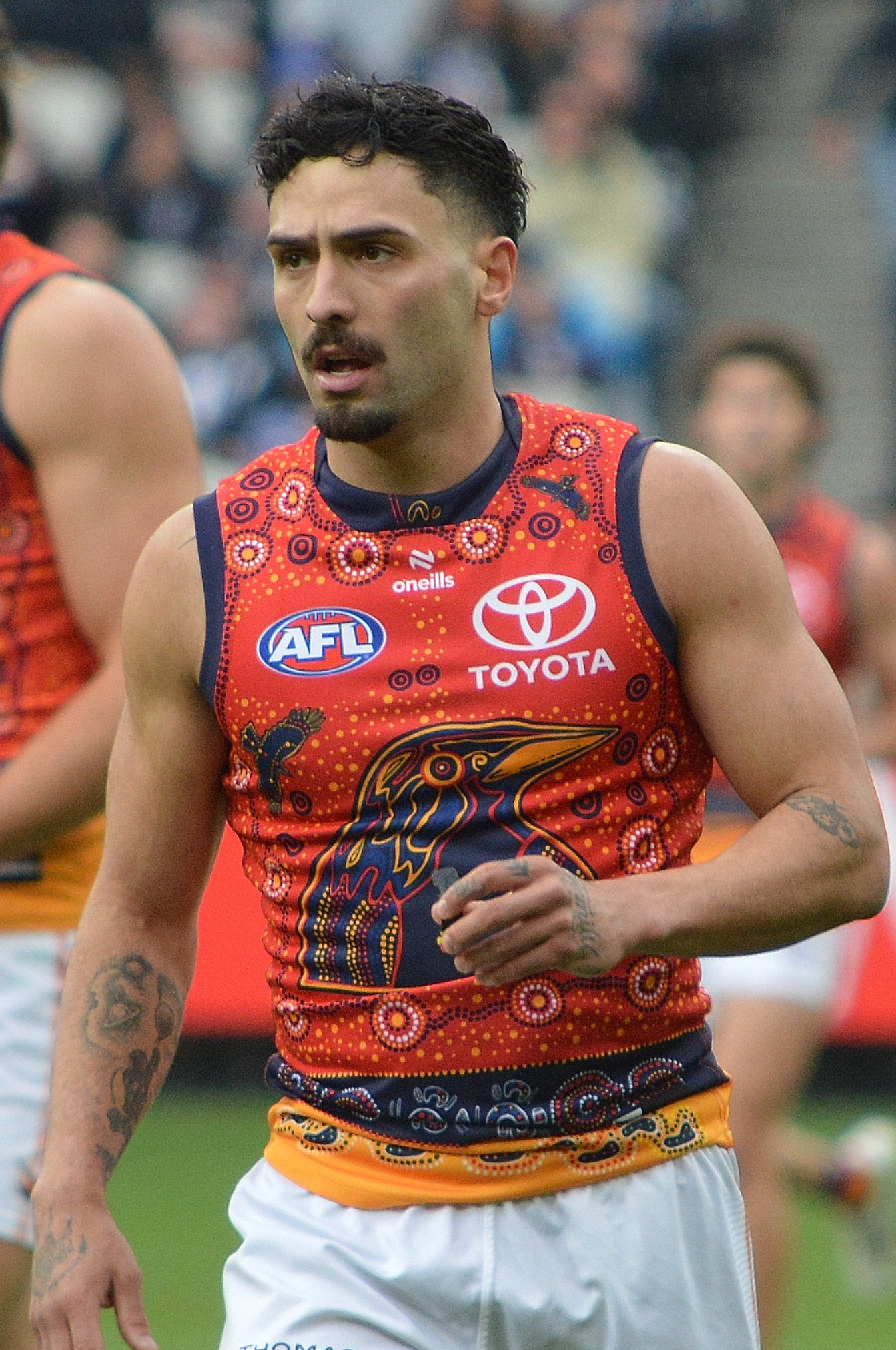
Rankine during a match against Collingwood in 2025

Rankine played his 50th career game in his first home game at Adelaide, in round 2 against Richmond in 2023. In April 2023, he was subjected to racial abuse on social media, which was investigated by AFL's integrity unit. Late in the season, Rankine suffered a hamstring injury which kept him on the sidelines for about three weeks. Rankine finished fourth in the Malcolm Blight Medal tally in just his first season at the club. In the off-season, Rankine changed his guernsey number from 22 to 23, which was the number previously worn by Andrew McLeod, most recently Shane McAdam, and other Indigenous Adelaide players since McLeod. The number also matches Rankine's date of birth.

In 2024, Rankine adopted a new role which saw him play more often as a midfielder. The shift was successful, and resulted in multiple matches in which Rankine had 20 or more disposals and multiple goals. For Sir Doug Nicholls Round, Rankine and his cousin Harley Hall designed Adelaide's (renamed for the occasion as Kuwarna) Indigenous guernsey, celebrating their shared Ngarrindjeri heritage. In May, David King suggested that Rankine could become "a top two or three player" in the competition in a matter of weeks. With moments to go and a single-digit margin in a match against Collingwood at the MCG, Rankine gave away a free kick for running further than 15 m without taking a bounce, denying a potential game-saving score for Adelaide. During this final play, Rankine injured his hamstring again, a repeat of the injury he suffered 10 months prior.

In round 17 against Brisbane Lions, Rankine struck Lions defender Brandon Starcevich, and was suspended for four matches for the incident. Rankine was racially abused on social media by a Brisbane club member, who had his membership revoked as a result. Both clubs condemned the behaviour. In only his second game since returning from suspension, during the second quarter of the 56th Showdown against cross-town rivals Port Adelaide, Dan Houston engaged in rough conduct with Rankine. Rankine was immediately concussed, having to be stretchered off the ground. Houston was sent straight to the AFL's tribunal and banned for five matches.

In 2025, Rankine made the 44-man All-Australian squad for the first time in his career.

==== Homophobic slur and suspension ====
On 16 August 2025, during the Crows' victory over Collingwood in round 23, Rankine reportedly used a homophobic slur against a Collingwood player (later revealed to be Isaac Quaynor). The incident prompted an investigation and for him to be suspended by the AFL for the rest of the season (including the finals, for which his team was a hot favorite) despite opposition to such a harsh punishment from the Crows. While he was remorseful for his actions, the incident sparked a broader discussion about homophobia and toxic masculinity in the league. Also featuring in the appeal was Dan Houston, who, following the altercation between the pair in 2024's Showdown, reportedly "provoked" Rankine throughout the 2025 match.

Rankine was subsequently suspended for four matches and left the country to train in privacy away from the media. In September, Rankine arrived in Adelaide from Italy and apologised in front of the media for his behaviour.

==== Return to football ====
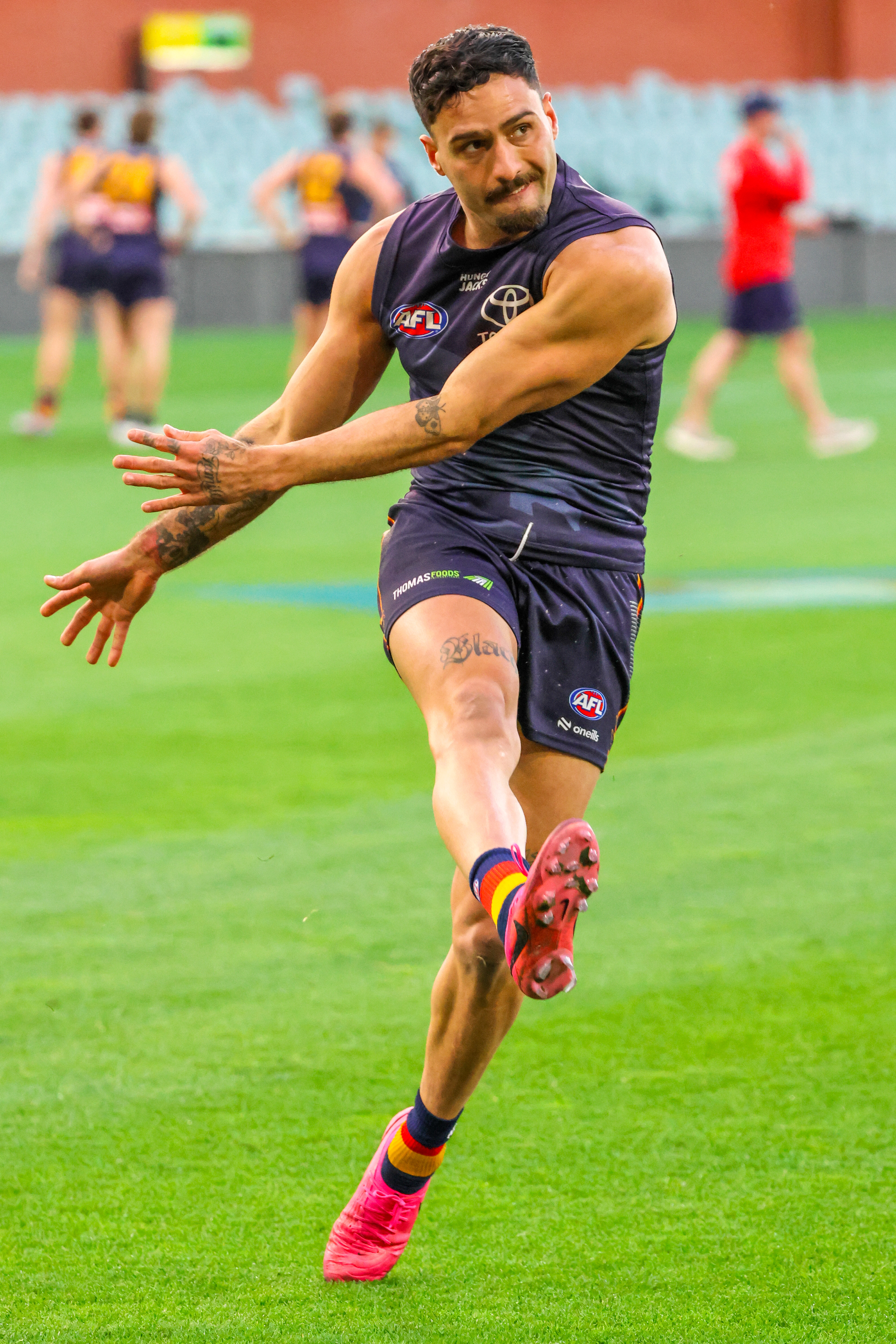
Rankine training at Adelaide Oval in July 2026

Rankine missed the first two games of 2026 to complete his suspension, thereby not playing against Collingwood at the start of the season. He returned in the round 2 loss to the Western Bulldogs to feature to his first competitive match of football in 2026. He took a while to return to his best form, but in the round 9 win over Richmond, Rankine collected a career-best 33 disposals and was rewarded with a perfect ten coaches' votes. Against his former side in the Suns, Rankine collected another 31 disposals and kicked a goal, hitting form towards the end of the year in preparation for his first finals series. A few weeks later, Rankine produced a career-best performance of 36 disposals, 10 marks, 9 tackles and a goal against Richmond. These statistics eclipsed a 26-year Adelaide record, becoming the highest ranked game by a Crow since Mark Ricciuto in 2000.

== Personal life ==
In his spare time, Rankine enjoys making music. and in May 2026 he joined Adelaide club ambassador Guy Sebastian on stage during his concert.

Rankine's cousin is Harley Hall, an Indigenous artist with whom he shares Ngarrindjeri-Kokatha heritage. It was alongside Hall that Rankine designed Adelaide's 2024 Indigenous guernsey. He has another cousin who is in a relationship with former Gold Coast player Sean Lemmens.

Rankine is sponsored by Monster Energy. In 2026, Rankine launched a collaboration with eyewear company Rixx, co-owned by former footballer Tommy Sheridan. AFL.com.au's Callum Twomey ranked him as the sixth most marketable player in the league in 2025.

== Statistics ==
Updated to the end of 2026.

Legend
G	Goals	K	Kicks	D	Disposals	T	Tackles
B	Behinds	H	Handballs	M	Marks

Season	Team	No.	Games	Totals							Averages (per game)							Votes
Season	Team	No.	Games	G	B	K	H	D	M	T	G	B	K	H	D	M	T	Votes
2019	Gold Coast	37	0	—	—	—	—	—	—	—	—	—	—	—	—	—	—	0
2020 (Note: The 2020 season was played with 17 home-and-away matches per team (down from 22) and 16-minute quarters with time on (down from 20-minute quarters with time on) due to the impact of the COVID-19 pandemic.)	Gold Coast	22	12	12	17	90	48	138	26	22	1.0	1.4	7.5	4.0	11.5	2.2	1.8	1
2021	Gold Coast	22	18	16	11	120	92	212	51	46	0.9	0.6	6.7	5.1	11.8	2.8	2.6	0
2022	Gold Coast	22	18	29	21	154	88	242	40	39	1.6	1.2	8.6	4.9	13.4	2.2	2.2	2
2023	Adelaide	22	20	36	27	197	121	318	74	64	1.8	1.4	9.9	6.1	15.9	3.7	3.2	7
2024	Adelaide	23	15	29	9	170	100	270	48	51	1.9	0.6	11.3	6.7	18.0	3.2	3.4	5
2025	Adelaide	23	22	31	21	285	167	452	87	78	1.4	1.0	13.0	7.6	20.5	4.0	3.5	15
2026	Adelaide	23	22	25	19	327	209	536	95	91	1.1	0.9	14.9	9.5	24.4	4.3	4.1	25
Career			127	178	125	1343	825	2168	421	391	1.4	1.0	10.6	6.5	17.1	3.3	3.1	55
