= Brandon Starcevich =

Australian rules footballer (born 1999)

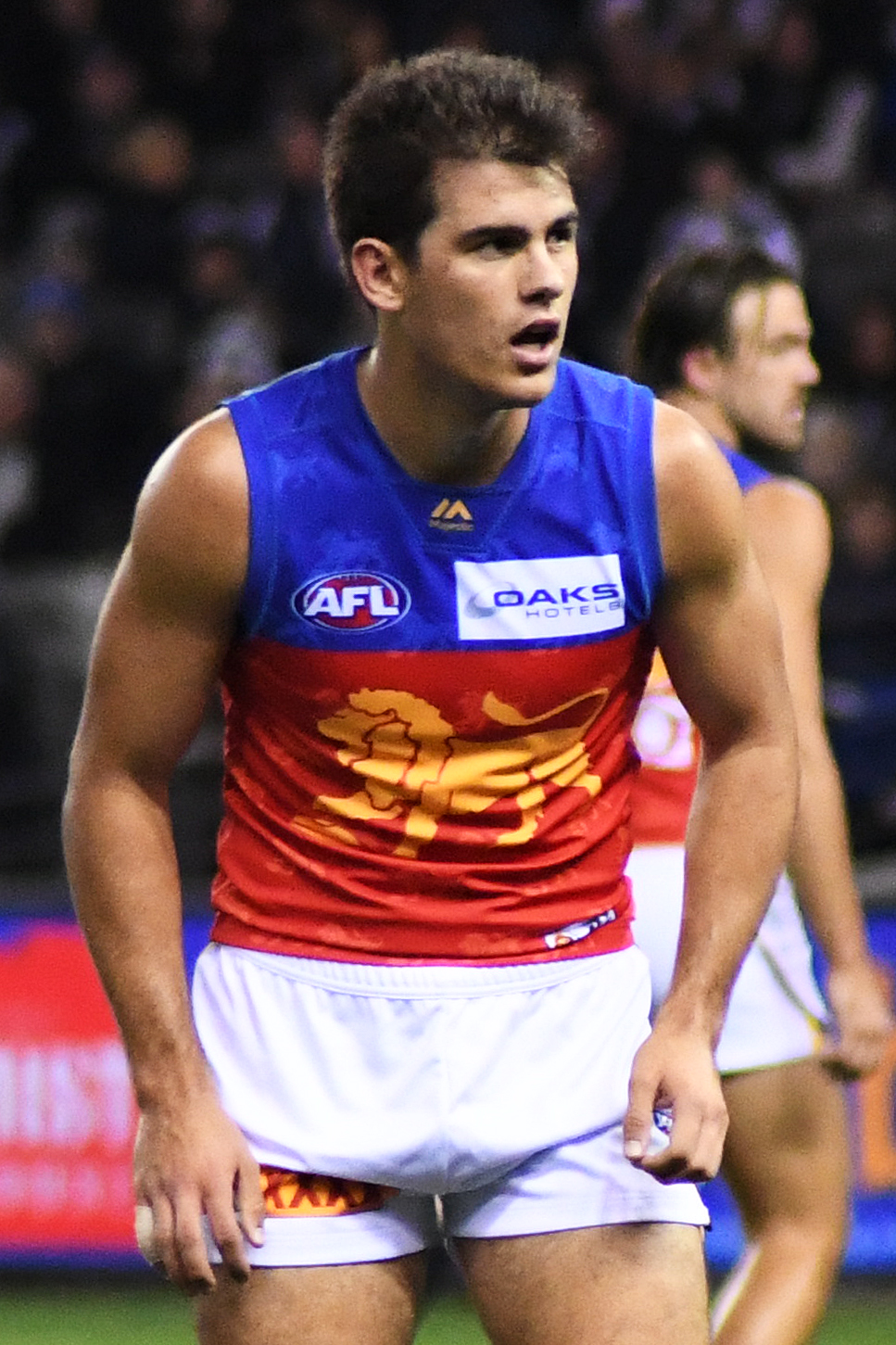
- Starcevich in August 2018

Personal information
- Born: 24 July 1999 (age 27)
- Original team: East Perth (WAFL)
- Draft: No. 18, 2017 national draft
- Debut: August 4, 2018, Brisbane Lions vs. North Melbourne, at the Gabba
- Height: 187 cm (6 ft 2 in)
- Weight: 92 kg (203 lb)
- Position: Defender

Club information
- Current club: West Coast
- Number: 4

Playing career^{1}
Years	Club	Games (Goals)
2018–2025	Brisbane Lions	132 (8)
2026–	West Coast	9 (1)
Total		139 (9)
- ^{1} Playing statistics correct to the end of round 22, 2026: 2× AFL premiership player: 2024, 2025; 22under22 team: 2021; AFL Rising Star nominee: 2020; Signature.

Brandon Starcevich (born 24 July 1999) is a professional Australian rules footballer playing for the West Coast Eagles in the Australian Football League (AFL). Starcevich is the nephew of Brisbane AFL Women's coach Craig Starcevich.

== Early football ==
Starcevich is from Western Australia, and was a Fremantle Dockers fan in his youth. He originally played for Mt Lawley-Inglewood Junior Football Club. Starcevich joined West Australian Football League club East Perth, playing 20 colts games across 2016–17 and averaging 13 disposals. He also played B Grade cricket for the Stirling Hawks Cricket Club with Daniel Pryce, athletics and football for Trinity College. Starcevich played for Western Australia in the 2017 AFL Under 18 Championships and attended the AFL Draft Combine. However, he was limited by a quad injury. Starcevich tested at the WA State Draft Combine and won the 20 m (66 ft) sprint with a time of 2.87 seconds. He was drafted by Brisbane with pick 18 in the 2017 national draft, their third selection, and was described as a 'contested bull'.

== AFL career ==
In 2018, Starcevich recorded five tackles and nine disposals in his debut against North Melbourne in round 20 after strong form in the North East Australian Football League. Soon after, he signed a two-year contract extension, tying him to Brisbane until 2021. In the 13th round of the 2020 AFL season, he earned a 2020 AFL Rising Star nomination for his performance against St Kilda, where he collected 10 disposals and took four marks.

At the start of the 2021 AFL season, Starcevich signed a four-year contract extension to remain with the Lions until the end of 2024.

Following a breakout 2020 in which he played 18 games, Starcevich continued to grow his game in the 2021 AFL season with his name being brought into the conversation with the best medium defenders in the competition. Some of his defensive efforts were keeping Fremantle's Michael Walters to one goal, Sydney's Tom Papley to one goal, Collingwood's Jordan De Goey to one goal, Essendon's Anthony McDonald-Tipungwuti to one goal and Adelaide's Eddie Betts goalless.

Starcevich finished third with 51 votes in the Merrett–Murray Medal after the 2022 AFL season.

Starcevich was a member of the Lions squad narrowly defeated by Collingwood in the 2023 AFL Grand Final. The following year, he was part of the Brisbane Lions 2024 premiership winning team in a 60-point victory over the Sydney Swans.

Following the 2025 AFL season and a second premiership, Starcevich announced that he would be leaving the Lions to take up an offer with West Coast. Starcevich ultimately moved to the Eagles as part of a three-way trade with Fremantle.

== Statistics ==
Updated to the end of round 22, 2026.

Legend
G	Goals	K	Kicks	D	Disposals	T	Tackles
B	Behinds	H	Handballs	M	Marks
#	Played in that season's premiership team

Season	Team	No.	Games	Totals							Averages (per game)							Votes
Season	Team	No.	Games	G	B	K	H	D	M	T	G	B	K	H	D	M	T	Votes
2018	Brisbane Lions	37	4	1	2	20	16	36	5	8	0.3	0.5	5.0	4.0	9.0	1.3	2.0	0
2019	Brisbane Lions	37	1	0	0	7	0	7	2	1	0.0	0.0	7.0	0.0	7.0	2.0	1.0	0
2020 (Note: The 2020 season was played with 17 home-and-away matches per team (down from 22) and 16-minute quarters with time on (down from 20-minute quarters with time on) due to the impact of the COVID-19 pandemic.)	Brisbane Lions	37	18	1	2	125	43	168	57	29	0.1	0.1	6.9	2.4	9.3	3.2	1.6	0
2021	Brisbane Lions	37	24	0	0	216	82	298	90	41	0.0	0.0	9.0	3.4	12.4	3.8	1.7	0
2022	Brisbane Lions	37	24	3	0	268	90	358	107	49	0.1	0.0	11.2	3.8	14.9	4.5	2.0	0
2023	Brisbane Lions	37	26	1	0	233	72	305	116	40	0.0	0.0	9.0	2.8	11.7	4.5	1.5	0
2024^{#}	Brisbane Lions	37	21	1	1	184	55	239	90	38	0.0	0.0	8.8	2.6	11.4	4.3	1.8	0
2025^{#}	Brisbane Lions	37	14	1	0	106	39	145	51	25	0.1	0.0	7.6	2.8	10.4	3.6	1.8	0
2026	West Coast	4	9	1	0	79	33	112	31	19	0.1	0.0	8.8	3.7	12.4	3.4	2.1	0
Career			141	9	5	1238	430	1668	549	250	0.1	0.0	8.8	3.0	11.8	3.9	1.8	0

== Honours and achievements ==
Team

- 2× AFL premiership player: 2024, 2025
- McClelland Trophy/Club Championship: 2025

Individual

- 22under22 team: 2021
- AFL Rising Star nominee: 2020 (round 13)
