= Elijah Taylor (Australian footballer) =

Australian football league player

Personal information
- Born: 1 May 2001 (age 25); Perth, Western Australia
- Original team: Perth
- Draft: No. 36, 2019 AFL draft, Sydney
- Debut: 17 July 2020, Sydney vs. Gold Coast, at Sydney Cricket Ground
- Height: 185 cm (6 ft 1 in)
- Weight: 75 kg (165 lb)
- Position: Midfield/Forward

Playing career^{1}
| Years | Club | Games (Goals) |
| 2020 | Sydney | 4 (1) |
- ^{1} Playing statistics correct to the end of 2020.

Elijah Taylor (born 1 May 2001) is a former Australian rules footballer who played for the Sydney Swans in the Australian Football League (AFL). He was recruited by the Sydney Swans with the 36th draft pick in the 2019 AFL draft. Taylor is an Indigenous Australian.

== Early football ==
Taylor played for his school side at Lynwood Senior High School, as well as for Perth in the Western Australian Football League, and was selected to play for Western Australia in the AFL Under 18 Championships.

== AFL career ==
Taylor debuted in the 7th round of the 2020 AFL season, against the Gold Coast Suns. In his first game, he picked up 9 disposals and a mark.

Taylor was stood down for the remainder of the 2020 season and his club was fined for breaking Western Australia's COVID-19 restrictions after he smuggled his girlfriend into Sydney Swans quarters.

Taylor was further stood down by the Swans later in 2020 following his arrest for allegedly assaulting his girlfriend. The Swans parted ways with Taylor on 30 November 2020.
