= Max King (footballer) =

Australian rules football player (born 2000)

Personal information
- Full name: Max King
- Born: 7 July 2000 (age 26); Melbourne, Victoria
- Original team: Sandringham Dragons (TAC Cup)
- Draft: No. 4, 2018 national draft
- Height: 202 cm (6 ft 8 in)
- Weight: 97 kg (214 lb)
- Position: Forward

Club information
- Current club: St Kilda
- Number: 12

Playing career^{1}
Years	Club	Games (Goals)
2019–	St Kilda	84 (159)
- ^{1} Playing statistics correct to the end of round 22, 2026.

Career highlights
- 2x St Kilda leading goalkicker: 2021, 2022; 3x 22under22: 2020, 2021, 2022; 2020 AFL Rising Star nominee

Max King (born 7 July 2000) is a professional Australian rules footballer playing for the St Kilda Football Club in the Australian Football League (AFL).

== Early life ==
King and his twin brother Ben King grew up in Hampton in Melbourne's Bayside area, with father Brook and mum Marni. The King twins would regularly play football, cricket, basketball and downball at the family home. The Klitschko brothers, who supported each other to become elite boxers, were a source of inspiration for Ben and Max, as were the Morris brothers in the NBA. King grew up supporting St Kilda, with Nick Riewoldt among his favourite players. King studied at and played for Haileybury College in high school, coached by AFL great Matthew Lloyd. He also played football for East Sandringham as a junior. In his bottom-age year, King kicked 10 goals in seven games for the Sandringham Dragons and a single game for Vic Metro in the TAC Cup. King was touted as the likely number one draft pick as he got close to his draft year. King dominated his only game for the Dragons in 2018, kicking eight goals before later suffering an injury. King suffered an anterior cruciate ligament (ACL) injury in April 2018 which ruled him out for the remainer of the season. Due to Sandringham's connection to St Kilda, King was invited to complete his rehabilitation at the Saints' facilities. King also managed an impressive ATAR of 97.8 in his final year of school education.

== AFL career ==
King was drafted by St Kilda with their first selection which was the fourth overall in the 2018 national draft. Twin brother Ben was also drafted that year, by the Gold Coast Suns with six. The King brothers were the first twins to both be drafted in the top 10.

=== 2019 season ===
King underwent a knee reconstruction after rupturing an anterior cruciate ligament early in his draft year, an injury he was still recovering from when drafted. King returned to the field for the Sandringham Zebras in the VFL in May 2019, playing 3 quarters and kicking 1 goal. In June, King sustained a right ankle injury while playing for Sandringham which prevented him from making his AFL debut in 2019. Overall, King played five VFL games and kicked 11 goals.

=== 2020 season ===
King made his AFL debut in St Kilda's round one match against North Melbourne. King finally played opposite his brother Ben in Round 10 against the Gold Coast at Carrara Stadium. It was the first time the King brothers had officially played against each other - even as juniors they refused to play against one another as according to Ben: "we both wanted each other to do well. If one of us played well but the other didn't, it wasn't a great result for us." Max ultimately had a quiet game, kicking 1 goal and taking three marks with his six disposals, while Ben kicked three goals from five disposals; the Saints won a thriller by four points. After a three-goal performance against Essendon in round 12, King received a Rising Star nomination. King played 18 of a possible 19 games for the Saints in a COVID-interrupted season and finished with 22 goals and two finals appearances. For season 2020, King was also St Kilda's second-highest goal scorer, finishing behind Dan Butler (29 goals), and equal-first for contested marks with Rowan Marshall. King was also selected in the AFL's 22under22 at full forward.

=== 2021 season ===
A golfing incident saw King miss round one with a concussion injury, but he returned to the side in Round 2 and kicked 2 goals against Melbourne. King then had a poor run of form in front of goal, kicking 11.21 (punctuated by a 5.2 effort against West Coast) including a disastrous 1.5 against Geelong in Round nine where he also had 10 marks. Public and media scrutiny of King was intense as a result, which included a St Kilda refusal to allow AFL great Matthew Lloyd (his high school football mentor) to provide some coaching and technique advice to King. Max faced his brother for just the second time in Round eight, again at Carrara Stadium, with Max kicking 1.2 and having 13 disposals and five marks, while Ben kicked 3.1 from nine disposals and three marks; the Saints ultimately came from behind to win by nine points.

However, King recovered from the poor form in the first half of the season to have a sensational second half. Following the Saints' bye in Round 14, King kicked 20.7. He had a career-best game in Round 19 against West Coast in Perth, kicking six goals and taking nine marks including eight contested inside 50 (a league record). King also kicked four goals straight the following weekend against Carlton. King (who had kicked 4 goals) suffered a groin injury against Sydney in Round 21 and was unable to complete the match. He was able to play the following week against Geelong, and kicked two goals in the first quarter before reaggravating the injury. King eventually returned to the field but was unable to play out the match. With the Saints out of the finals, King subsequently sat out the final game of the season. So impressive was King's form in the second half of the year that he was selected in the 40-man preliminary 22under22 squad. King also finished ninth in the Trevor Barker Award and earned the Best Emerging Player Award at the annual Best and Fairest.

== Statistics ==
Updated to the end of round 22, 2026.

Legend
G	Goals	K	Kicks	D	Disposals	T	Tackles
B	Behinds	H	Handballs	M	Marks

Season	Team	No.	Games	Totals							Averages (per game)							Votes
Season	Team	No.	Games	G	B	K	H	D	M	T	G	B	K	H	D	M	T	Votes
2020 (Note: The 2020 season was played with 17 home-and-away matches per team (down from 22) and 16-minute quarters with time on (down from 20-minute quarters with time on) due to the impact of the COVID-19 pandemic.)	St Kilda	12	18	22	20	84	53	137	57	22	1.2	1.1	4.7	2.9	7.6	3.2	1.2	0
2021	St Kilda	12	20	38	30	126	67	193	90	16	1.9	1.5	6.3	3.4	9.7	4.5	0.8	3
2022	St Kilda	12	22	52	41	172	61	233	115	16	2.4	1.9	7.8	2.8	10.6	5.2	0.7	6
2023	St Kilda	12	11	28	12	73	30	103	48	10	2.5	1.1	6.6	2.7	9.4	4.4	0.9	5
2024	St Kilda	12	12	19	12	84	41	125	50	8	1.6	1.0	7.0	3.4	10.4	4.2	0.7	0
2025	St Kilda	12	0	—	—	—	—	—	—	—	—	—	—	—	—	—	—	0
2026	St Kilda	12	1	0	0	1	1	2	1	0	0.0	0.0	1.0	1.0	2.0	1.0	0.0	0
Career			84	159	115	540	253	793	361	72	1.9	1.4	6.4	3.0	9.4	4.3	0.9	14
