= Jake Riccardi =

Australian rules footballer

Personal information
- Born: 7 November 1999 (age 26)
- Original team: Werribee (VFL)
- Draft: No. 51, 2019 national draft
- Debut: 23 August 2020, Greater Western Sydney vs. West Coast, at Perth Stadium
- Height: 198 cm (6 ft 6 in)
- Weight: 100 kg (220 lb)
- Position: Key Forward

Club information
- Current club: Greater Western Sydney
- Number: 26

Playing career^{1}
Years	Club	Games (Goals)
2020–	Greater Western Sydney	98 (124)
- ^{1} Playing statistics correct to the end of round 22, 2026.

Career highlights
- 2020 AFL Rising Star: nominee; Fothergill–Round–Mitchell Medal: 2019

Jake Riccardi (born November 7, 1999) is an Australian rules footballer who plays for the Greater Western Sydney Giants in the Australian Football League (AFL). He was recruited by the Greater Western Sydney Giants with the 51st draft pick in the 2019 AFL draft.

== Early football ==
Riccardi played for the Calder Cannons in the NAB League for the 2017 and 2018 seasons. Although he played 29 games and kicked 25 goals over his two seasons at the club, he was overlooked for the AFL draft, and in 2019 joined the Werribee Football Club in the Victorian Football League (VFL). During his time with Werribee, Riccardi starred, kicking a total of 38 goals. Riccardi won the Fothergill–Round–Mitchell Medal for best young talent in the VFL.

== AFL career ==
Riccardi debuted in the Giants' 12 point loss to the West Coast Eagles in the 13th round of the 2020 AFL season. On debut, Riccardi kicked 2 goals. In his next game, Riccardi kicked 4 goals in the Giants' 38 point win over the Fremantle Dockers, earning much attention and being compared to former AFL stars such as Matthew Pavlich and Wayne Carey. He earned a 2020 AFL Rising Star nomination for his Round 14 performance.

== Statistics ==
Updated to the end of round 22, 2026.

Legend
G	Goals	K	Kicks	D	Disposals	T	Tackles
B	Behinds	H	Handballs	M	Marks

Season	Team	No.	Games	Totals							Averages (per game)							Votes
Season	Team	No.	Games	G	B	K	H	D	M	T	G	B	K	H	D	M	T	Votes
2020 (Note: The 2020 season was played with 17 home-and-away matches per team (down from 22) and 16-minute quarters with time on (down from 20-minute quarters with time on) due to the impact of the COVID-19 pandemic.)	Greater Western Sydney	26	5	9	6	37	15	52	30	2	1.8	1.2	7.4	3.0	10.4	6.0	0.4	0
2021	Greater Western Sydney	26	9	2	1	44	37	81	24	3	0.2	0.1	4.9	4.1	9.0	2.7	0.3	0
2022	Greater Western Sydney	26	15	15	14	104	47	151	74	23	1.0	0.9	6.9	3.1	10.1	4.9	1.5	0
2023	Greater Western Sydney	26	21	35	20	146	52	198	84	33	1.7	1.0	7.0	2.5	9.4	4.0	1.6	2
2024	Greater Western Sydney	26	19	26	12	133	72	205	93	27	1.4	0.6	7.0	3.8	10.8	4.9	1.4	2
2025	Greater Western Sydney	26	20	23	13	152	99	251	85	63	1.2	0.7	7.6	5.0	12.6	4.3	3.2	0
2026	Greater Western Sydney	26	9	14	4	63	41	104	34	17	1.6	0.4	7.0	4.6	11.6	3.8	1.9	0
Career			98	124	70	679	363	1042	424	168	1.3	0.7	6.9	3.7	10.6	4.3	1.7	4
