= Josh Schoenfeld =

Australian rules footballer

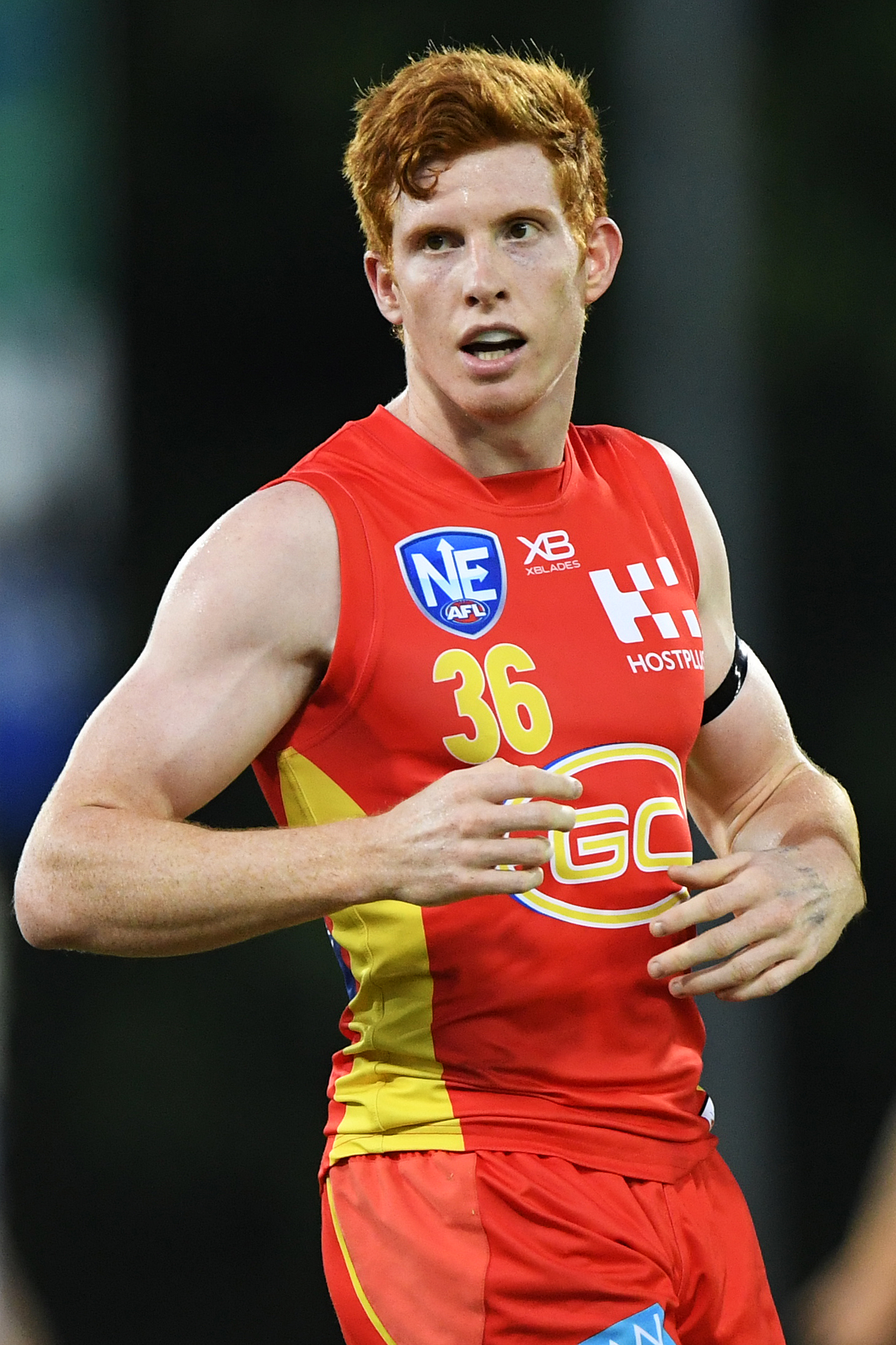
- Schoenfeld playing for Gold Coast in May 2019

Personal information
- Full name: Joshua Schoenfeld
- Born: 3 July 1997 (age 29)
- Original team: Peel Thunder (WAFL) Rockingham Rams (WA)
- Draft: No. 34, 2015 national draft
- Debut: Round 18, 2016, Gold Coast vs. Fremantle, at Metricon Stadium
- Height: 186 cm (6 ft 1 in)
- Weight: 84 kg (185 lb)
- Position: Midfielder

Club information
- Current club: Gold Coast
- Number: 36

Playing career^{1}
Years	Club	Games (Goals)
2016–2020	Gold Coast	15 (5)
2021–	East Fremantle	69 (41)
- ^{1} Playing statistics correct to the end of round 1, 2024.

Joshua Schoenfeld (born 3 July 1997) is a former Australian rules footballer who played for the Gold Coast Football Club in the Australian Football League (AFL). He was drafted by the Gold Coast Football Club with their third selection and thirty-fourth overall in the 2015 national draft.

He made his debut in the twenty-four point win against Fremantle in round 18, 2016 at Metricon Stadium. He kicked his first goal against the Brisbane Lions in Round 1 of the 2017 season. Schoenfeld was delisted by the Suns at the conclusion of the 2019 AFL season, but he was re-drafted in the 2019 Rookie Draft. He was again delisted at the end of the 2020 season, and returned to Western Australia to play for East Fremantle in the West Australian Football League (WAFL). He was selected to represent Western Australia in the interstate match against South Australia in 2021.
