= Sam Skinner (footballer) =

Australian rules footballer

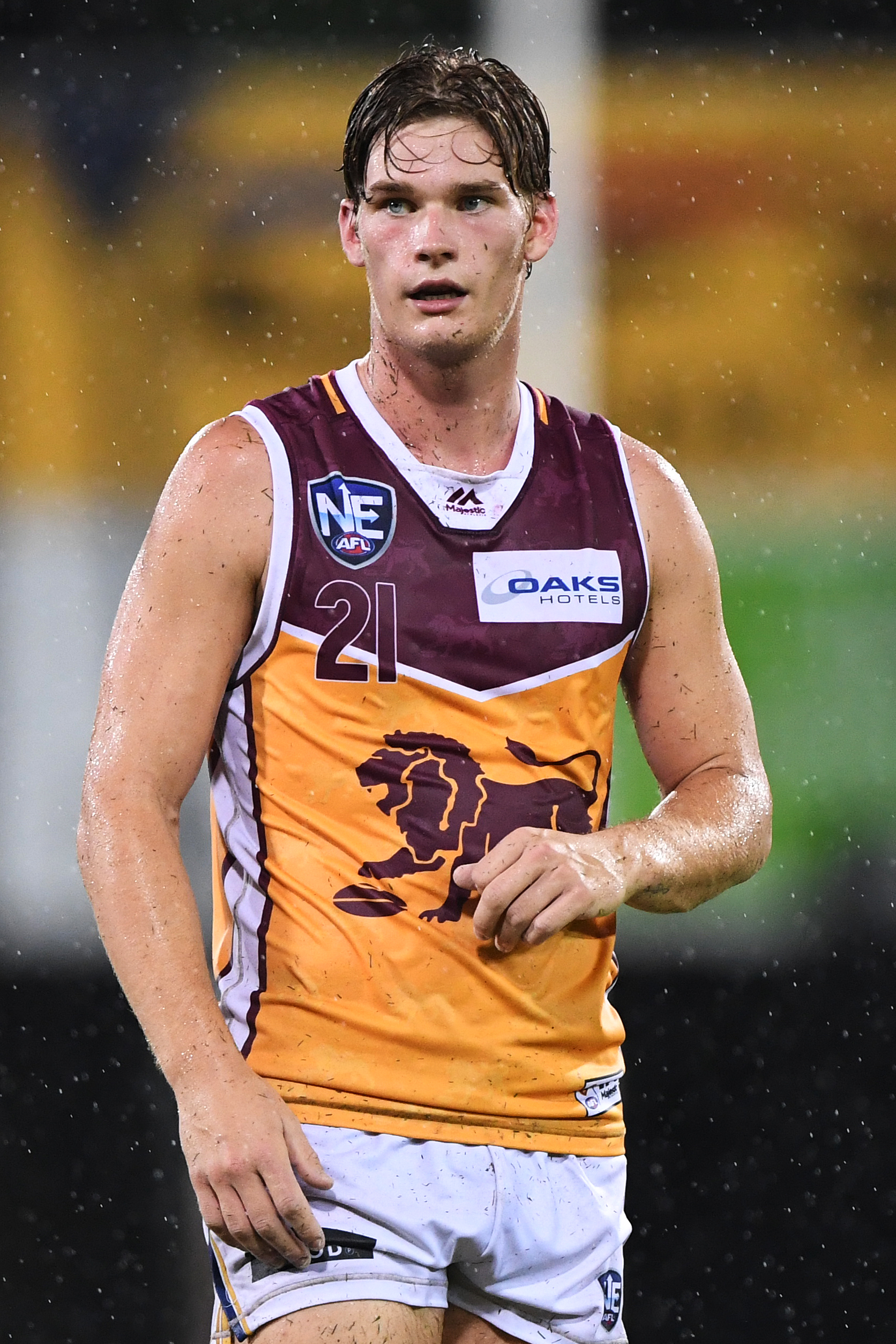
- Skinner in April 2019

Personal information
- Born: 29 June 1997 (age 29); Moe
- Original team: Gippsland Power (TAC Cup)
- Draft: No. 47, 2015 national draft
- Debut: Round 19, 2017, Brisbane Lions vs. West Coast, at Subiaco Oval
- Height: 197 cm (6 ft 6 in)
- Weight: 94 kg (207 lb)
- Position: Centre half-back / Half-forward

Playing career^{1}
Years	Club	Games (Goals)
2016–2020	Brisbane Lions	3 (3)
2022	Port Adelaide	2 (0)
Total		5 (3)
- ^{1} Playing statistics correct to the end of 2022.

Sam Skinner (born 29 June 1997) is a former professional Australian rules footballer who played for the Brisbane Lions and Port Adelaide Football Club in the Australian Football League (AFL). He was drafted by Brisbane with pick 47 in the 2015 national draft. He made his debut in the loss to West Coast at Subiaco Oval in round 19 of the 2017 season, kicking two goals. After three games for the club, he was delisted at the conclusion of the 2020 season.

Following an impressive year with South Adelaide in the SANFL, Skinner was signed to Port Adelaide as a delisted free agent ahead of the 2022 AFL season, during which he played two games before being delisted again in August.
