= Fischer McAsey =

Australian rules footballer

Personal information
- Full name: Fischer McAsey
- Born: 8 March 2001 (age 25)
- Original teams: Sandringham Dragons, NAB League
- Draft: No. 6, 2019 national draft
- Debut: Round 1, 2020, Adelaide vs. Sydney, at Adelaide Oval
- Height: 197 cm (6 ft 6 in)
- Weight: 91 kg (201 lb)
- Position: Key Defender

Playing career^{1}
Years	Club	Games (Goals)
2020–2023	Adelaide	10 (0)
- ^{1} Playing statistics correct to the end of 2020.

Fischer McAsey (born 8 March 2001) is a former professional Australian rules footballer who played for the Adelaide Football Club in the Australian Football League (AFL). A key defender, he stands at 1.97 metres (6 ft 6 in) tall and weighed 91 kilograms (201 lb) at the time of his retirement from the AFL. Prior to being drafted, he played for Sandringham Dragons in the NAB League and for his school Caulfield Grammar School. He quit the Crows on 9 January 2023, citing personal reasons.

== Statistics ==
Statistics are correct to the end of 2022

Legend
G	Goals	K	Kicks	D	Disposals	T	Tackles
B	Behinds	H	Handballs	M	Marks

Season	Team	No.	Games	Totals							Averages (per game)							Votes
Season	Team	No.	Games	G	B	K	H	D	M	T	G	B	K	H	D	M	T	Votes
2020	Adelaide	35	10	0	2	35	29	64	21	12	0.0	0.2	3.5	2.9	6.4	2.1	1.2	0
2021	Adelaide	3	0	–	–	–	–	–	–	–	–	–	–	–	–	–	–	–
2022	Adelaide	3	0	–	–	–	–	–	–	–	–	–	–	–	–	–	–	–
Career			10	0	2	35	29	64	21	12	0.0	0.2	3.5	2.9	6.4	2.1	1.2	0
