= 2023 Gold Coast Suns season =

13th Gold Coast Suns season

The 2023 Gold Coast Suns season was Gold Coast's 13th season competing in the Australian Football League (AFL) and 15th overall. The club also fielded a women's side that competed in the AFLW's 8th season, an AFL reserves team in the Victorian Football League (VFL), and Academy teams in the Talent League Boys and Talent League Girls competitions.

== AFL ==
Gold Coast Suns
2023 AFL season
- Coach: Stuart Dew (6th season) (R1−R17); Steven King (Caretaker Coach) (R18−R24)
- Captains: Jarrod Witts & Touk Miller (2nd season)
- Home ground: Heritage Bank Stadium
- Practice Match: Lost by 45 points
- Home & Away: 9 wins, 14 losses, 0 draws (15th)
- Finals: DNQ
- Best & Fairest: Noah Anderson (First win)
- Leading goalkicker: Ben King (Third win)
- Highest home attendance: 36,219 vs. West Coast (Round 9)
- Lowest home attendance: 4,378 vs. North Melbourne (Round 24)
- Average home attendance: 13,724
- Club membership: 23,359

=== Season summary ===
The 2023 season was Gold Coast's sixth season being coached by Stuart Dew. The season would also be Dew's last season as coach of the Suns. He coached his last game for Gold Coast in round 17. For the second season Jarrod Witts & Touk Miller captained the Suns. The 2023 AFL season would also be the first and last season of the home ground being named Heritage Bank Stadium.

Gold Coast had a slow start to the season losing four of their first five matches. The Suns then won five of their next seven matches to make the win-loss record 6-6 and putting them 11th on the ladder.

Gold Coast played four more matches with Stuart Dew as their coach until he was sacked. The only game they won out of their last four matches with Dew was a 67-point win against Hawthorn at Heritage Bank Stadium. Gold Coast's hired former Geelong & St Kilda player Steven King to act as their Caretaker Coach for the rest of the 2023 season. The Suns won two of their last six matches of the season finishing 15th place with a win-loss record of 9 wins and 14 losses.

=== Pre-season ===
In an unofficial match simulation, Gold Coast were defeated by Essendon by five points at Austworld Centre Oval. The match simulation was played with six quarters that lasted 25 minutes each. GWS defeated Gold Coast in the official AFL practice match by 44 points. The game was played at Manuka Oval.

=== Coaching staff ===
Stuart Dew coached his sixth season for Gold Coast in 2023. Dew coached the Suns for the first 17 games of the season. After Dew was sacked by the club, Gold Coast hired Steven King to coach the Suns for the last 7 games of the season.

On 21 August 2023, Damien Hardwick (who had resigned as Richmond coach on 22 May 2023) was announced as the senior coach of the Gold Coast Suns on a six-year contract, starting from the 2024 season.

2023 Gold Coast coaching staff
| Role | Name |
|---|---|
| Senior Coach | Stuart Dew (R1-R17) |
| Caretaker Coach, Senior Assistant Coach & Midfield Coach | Steven King |
| Assistant Coach - Forwards | Brad Miller |
| Assistant Coach - Defenders | Tate Kaesler |
| Head of Development | Rhyce Shaw |
| Development Coach | Jackson Kornberg |

=== 2023 playing squad ===
Gold Coast Suns 2023 playing squad
| Senior list | | Rookie list | Coaching staff |
|---|---|---|---|
| 1 Mabior Chol; 2 Rory Atkins; 3 Sam Flanders; 4 Brandon Ellis; 5 Alex Davies; 6 Alex Sexton; 7 Nick Holman; 8 Brayden Fiorini; 9 Ben Ainsworth; 10 Charlie Ballard; 11 Touk Miller (vc); 12 Sam Day; 13 Jack Lukosius; 14 Lachie Weller; 15 Noah Anderson; 16 Tom Berry; 18 Matt Rowell; 19 Bailey Humphrey; 20 Jeremy Sharp | 22 Ben Long; 23 Sean Lemmens; 24 David Swallow (c); 25 Sam Collins; 27 Wil Powell; 28 Jarrod Witts (c); 29 Chris Burgess; 30 Levi Casboult; 31 Mac Andrew; 33 Charlie Constable; 34 Ben King; 35 Connor Budarick; 36 Elijah Hollands; 40 Joel Jeffrey; 41 Malcolm Rosas Jr; 44 Darcy Macpherson; 46 Caleb Graham; 49 Ned Moyle; 50 Jy Farrar | 17 Jed Anderson; 21 James Tsitas; 26 Connor Blakely; 32 Bodhi Uwland; 38 Lloyd Johnston (B); 42 Jake Stein; 43 Brodie McLaughlin; 45 Sandy Brock; 47 Hewego Paul Oea (B) | Head coach: Stuart Dew R1−R17 Steven King R18−R24; Assistant coaches: Josh Drummond (Defence and Tackling); Tate Kaesler (Team Defence and Strategy); Jackson Kornberg (VFL Head Coach); Rhyce Shaw (Head of Development) Assistant coaches; Brad Miller (Forwards and Training Design Coach); Tate Kaesler (Team Defence and Strategy); Jackson Kornberg (VFL Head Coach); Rhyce Shaw (Head of Development); Legend: (c) Captain(s); (vc) Vice-captain(s); (B) Category B rookie; italics - Inactive player list; Long-term injury; (ret.) Retired; Updated: 6 November 2026; Source(s): Playing list, Coaching staff |

==== Changes ====
Deletions from playing list
| Player | Reason | Ref |
|---|---|---|
| Jack Bowes | Trade to Geelong | |
| Matt Conroy | Delisted | |
| Josh Corbett | Trade to Fremantle | |
| Jez McLennan | Delisted | |
| Oleg Markov | Delisted | |
| Patrick Murtagh | Delisted | |
| Rhys Nicholls | Delisted | |
| Izak Rankine | Trade to Adelaide | |
| Rory Thompson | Retired | |

Additions to playing list
| Player | Reason | Ref |
|---|---|---|
| Jed Anderson | Pre-Season Supplemental Selection Period | |
| Tom Berry | Trade from Brisbane | |
| Connor Blakely | Rookie Draft | |
| Bailey Humphrey | No 6, 2022 National Draft | |
| Lloyd Johnston | Category B Rookie | |
| Ben Long | Trade from St Kilda | |
| Brodie McLaughlin | Pre-Season Supplemental Selection Period | |
| Jake Stein | Rookie Draft | |

==== Statistics ====
| Player | No. | Games | G | B | K | H | D | T | M | HO | Milestones |
|---|---|---|---|---|---|---|---|---|---|---|---|
| Mabior Chol | 1 | 8 | 10 | 7 | 49 | 12 | 61 | 14 | 28 | 25 | |
| Rory Atkins | 2 | 17 | 3 | 3 | 241 | 104 | 345 | 19 | 87 | 0 | |
| Sam Flanders | 3 | 14 | 5 | 3 | 179 | 160 | 339 | 35 | 75 | 0 | |
| Brandon Ellis | 4 | 16 | 7 | 8 | 195 | 93 | 288 | 37 | 86 | 0 | |
| Alex Davies | 5 | 9 | 1 | 3 | 60 | 69 | 129 | 39 | 15 | 0 | |
| Alex Sexton | 6 | 8 | 5 | 4 | 29 | 14 | 43 | 5 | 14 | 0 | |
| Nick Holman | 7 | 19 | 13 | 8 | 101 | 132 | 233 | 84 | 48 | 0 | |
| Brayden Fiorini | 8 | 17 | 4 | 8 | 204 | 98 | 302 | 44 | 69 | 0 | |
| Ben Ainsworth | 9 | 21 | 21 | 15 | 228 | 143 | 371 | 39 | 100 | 0 | 100 Games (Round 4) |
| Charlie Ballard | 10 | 23 | 1 | 0 | 230 | 63 | 293 | 29 | 142 | 0 | |
| Touk Miller | 11 | 13 | 4 | 1 | 191 | 133 | 324 | 68 | 50 | 0 | |
| Sam Day | 12 | 3 | 1 | 1 | 13 | 6 | 19 | 5 | 10 | 2 | |
| Jack Lukosius | 13 | 22 | 39 | 22 | 256 | 41 | 297 | 24 | 140 | 0 | |
| Lachie Weller | 14 | 9 | 0 | 2 | 138 | 56 | 194 | 15 | 61 | 0 | |
| Noah Anderson | 15 | 23 | 14 | 15 | 380 | 239 | 619 | 79 | 104 | 0 | |
| Tom Berry | 16 | 6 | 0 | 2 | 24 | 16 | 40 | 19 | 10 | 0 | Club Debut (Round 8) |
| Jed Anderson | 17 | 0 | 0 | 0 | 0 | 0 | 0 | 0 | 0 | 0 | |
| Matt Rowell | 18 | 23 | 7 | 2 | 273 | 214 | 487 | 190 | 43 | 0 | |
| Bailey Humphrey | 19 | 19 | 11 | 12 | 148 | 88 | 236 | 49 | 32 | 0 | AFL Debut (Round 4) |
| Jeremy Sharp | 20 | 0 | 0 | 0 | 0 | 0 | 0 | 0 | 0 | 0 | |
| James Tsitas | 21 | 4 | 3 | 0 | 10 | 9 | 19 | 4 | 8 | 0 | |
| Ben Long | 22 | 15 | 0 | 1 | 114 | 57 | 171 | 34 | 42 | 0 | Club Debut (Round 1) |
| Sean Lemmens | 23 | 11 | 0 | 1 | 83 | 22 | 105 | 19 | 38 | 0 | |
| David Swallow | 24 | 23 | 14 | 11 | 222 | 160 | 382 | 101 | 78 | 0 | 200 Games (Round 3); 100 Goals (Round 24) |
| Sam Collins | 25 | 23 | 0 | 0 | 176 | 104 | 280 | 37 | 127 | 0 | |
| Connor Blakely | 26 | 0 | 0 | 0 | 0 | 0 | 0 | 0 | 0 | 0 | |
| Wil Powell | 27 | 18 | 0 | 3 | 275 | 90 | 365 | 42 | 115 | 0 | |
| Jarrod Witts | 28 | 21 | 4 | 2 | 151 | 139 | 290 | 55 | 51 | 824 | 150 Games (Round 8) |
| Chris Burgees | 29 | 1 | 0 | 2 | 3 | 2 | 5 | 0 | 1 | 3 | |
| Levi Casboult | 30 | 20 | 24 | 11 | 138 | 57 | 195 | 29 | 95 | 93 | |
| Mac Andrew | 31 | 17 | 0 | 0 | 148 | 39 | 187 | 24 | 88 | 0 | |
| Bodhi Uwland | 32 | 3 | 0 | 0 | 19 | 6 | 25 | 3 | 5 | 0 | AFL Debut (Round 1) |
| Charlie Constable | 33 | 2 | 0 | 0 | 36 | 9 | 45 | 2 | 12 | 0 | |
| Ben King | 34 | 20 | 40 | 21 | 112 | 46 | 158 | 9 | 672 | 0 | 100 Goals (Round 6) |
| Connor Budarick | 35 | 2 | 0 | 0 | 29 | 6 | 35 | 5 | 10 | 0 | |
| Elijah Hollands | 36 | 9 | 3 | 2 | 72 | 42 | 114 | 23 | 23 | 0 | |
| Oscar Faulkhead | 37 | 0 | 0 | 0 | 0 | 0 | 0 | 0 | 0 | 0 | |
| Lloyd Johnston | 38 | 2 | 0 | 0 | 16 | 8 | 24 | 3 | 4 | 0 | AFL Debut (Round 23) |
| Joel Jeffrey | 40 | 7 | 5 | 4 | 54 | 13 | 67 | 23 | 16 | 0 | |
| Malcolm Rosas | 41 | 19 | 19 | 17 | 109 | 68 | 177 | 42 | 38 | 0 | |
| Jake Stein | 42 | 0 | 0 | 0 | 0 | 0 | 0 | 0 | 0 | 0 | |
| Brodie McLaughlin | 43 | 0 | 0 | 0 | 0 | 0 | 0 | 0 | 0 | 0 | |
| Darcy Macpherson | 44 | 23 | 3 | 2 | 306 | 135 | 441 | 48 | 128 | 0 | |
| Sandy Brock | 45 | 0 | 0 | 0 | 0 | 0 | 0 | 0 | 0 | 0 | |
| Caleb Graham | 46 | 0 | 0 | 0 | 0 | 0 | 0 | 0 | 0 | 0 | |
| Hewago Oea | 47 | 8 | 3 | 1 | 41 | 30 | 71 | 20 | 11 | 0 | |
| Ned Moyle | 49 | 2 | 0 | 0 | 6 | 3 | 9 | 10 | 0 | 53 | AFL Debut (Round 4) |
| Jy Farrar | 50 | 9 | 1 | 1 | 48 | 29 | 77 | 17 | 21 | 0 | |

=== Results ===
Keys
| H | Home game |
| A | Away game |
| N | Neutral venue game |

Table of 2023 AFL Season Results
| Round | Date | Result | Score | | | Opponent | Score | | | Ground | | Attendance | Ladder |
| Round | Date | Result | G | B | T | Opponent | G | B | T | Ground | | Attendance | Ladder |
|---|---|---|---|---|---|---|---|---|---|---|---|---|---|
| 1 | 18 March | Lost | 9 | 7 | 61 | Sydney | 16 | 14 | 110 | Heritage Bank Stadium | H | 13,648 | 17th |
| 2 | 26 March | Lost | 11 | 14 | 80 | Essendon | 16 | 12 | 108 | Marvel Stadium | A | 32,915 | 16th |
| 3 | 2 April | Won | 10 | 13 | 73 | Geelong | 7 | 12 | 54 | Heritage Bank Stadium | H | 13,122 | 15th |
| 4 | 8 April | Lost | 8 | 12 | 60 | St Kilda | 17 | 11 | 113 | Marvel Stadium | A | 21,049 | 17th |
| 5 | 14 April | Lost | 13 | 12 | 90 | Fremantle | 15 | 10 | 100 | Norwood Oval | N | 9,329 | 16th |
| 6 | 23 April | Won | 14 | 13 | 97 | North Melbourne | 7 | 12 | 54 | Heritage Bank Stadium | H | 9,672 | 14th |
| 7 | 30 April | Won | 11 | 6 | 72 | Richmond | 6 | 12 | 48 | Marvel Stadium | A | 23,664 | 13th |
| 8 | 6 May | Lost | 13 | 7 | 85 | Melbourne | 13 | 12 | 90 | Heritage Bank Stadium | H | 11,440 | 14th |
| 9 | 12 May | Won | 16 | 17 | 113 | West Coast | 6 | 7 | 43 | Optus Stadium | A | 36,219 | 11th |
| 10 | 20 May | Lost | 9 | 10 | 64 | Brisbane Lions | 16 | 11 | 107 | Gabba | A | 23,286 | 13th |
| 11 | 27 May | Won | 13 | 6 | 84 | Western Bulldogs | 11 | 11 | 77 | TIO Stadium | N | 9,316 | 12th |
| 12 | 3 June | Won | 16 | 16 | 112 | Adelaide | 13 | 9 | 87 | TIO Stadium | N | 10,772 | 11th |
| 13 | Bye | | | | | | | | | | | | 11th |
| 14 | 18 June | Lost | 8 | 13 | 61 | Carlton | 18 | 12 | 120 | MCG | A | 29,602 | 12th |
| 15 | 25 June | Won | 14 | 17 | 101 | Hawthorn | 5 | 4 | 34 | Heritage Bank Stadium | H | 14,242 | 10th |
| 16 | 1 July | Lost | 5 | 12 | 42 | Collingwood | 18 | 12 | 1 | Heritage Bank Stadium | H | 22,483 | 12th |
| 17 | 8 July | Lost | 11 | 7 | 73 | Port Adelaide | 16 | 10 | 106 | Adelaide Oval | A | 31,053 | 13th |
| 18 | 15 July | Won | 11 | 11 | 77 | St Kilda | 8 | 3 | 51 | Heritage Bank Stadium | H | 13,015 | 13th |
| 19 | 23 July | Lost | 9 | 9 | 63 | Greater Western Sydney | 15 | 13 | 103 | Manuka Oval | A | 10,026 | 14th |
| 20 | 29 July | Won | 15 | 6 | 96 | Brisbane Lions | 7 | 13 | 55 | Heritage Bank Stadium | H | 14,097 | 14th |
| 21 | 5 August | Lost | 9 | 7 | 61 | Adelaide | 13 | 11 | 89 | Adelaide Oval | A | 35,777 | 14th |
| 22 | 12 August | Lost | 13 | 12 | 90 | Sydney | 18 | 6 | 114 | SCG | A | 33,911 | 15th |
| 23 | 19 August | Lost | 13 | 9 | 87 | Carlton | 13 | 13 | 91 | Heritage Bank Stadium | H | 19,253 | 15th |
| 24 | 26 August | Lost | 14 | 13 | 97 | North Melbourne | 20 | 12 | 132 | Blundstone Arena | A | 4,378 | 15th |

=== Ladder ===
| Pos | Team | Pld | W | L | D | PF | PA | PP | Pts | Qualification |
|---|---|---|---|---|---|---|---|---|---|---|
| 1 | Collingwood (P) | 23 | 18 | 5 | 0 | 2142 | 1687 | 127.0 | 72 | Finals series |
| 2 | Brisbane Lions | 23 | 17 | 6 | 0 | 2180 | 1771 | 123.1 | 68 | Finals series |
| 3 | Port Adelaide | 23 | 17 | 6 | 0 | 2149 | 1906 | 112.7 | 68 | Finals series |
| 4 | Melbourne | 23 | 16 | 7 | 0 | 2079 | 1660 | 125.2 | 64 | Finals series |
| 5 | Carlton | 23 | 13 | 9 | 1 | 1922 | 1697 | 113.3 | 54 | Finals series |
| 6 | St Kilda | 23 | 13 | 10 | 0 | 1775 | 1647 | 107.8 | 52 | Finals series |
| 7 | Greater Western Sydney | 23 | 13 | 10 | 0 | 2018 | 1885 | 107.1 | 52 | Finals series |
| 8 | Sydney | 23 | 12 | 10 | 1 | 2050 | 1863 | 110.0 | 50 | Finals series |
| 9 | Western Bulldogs | 23 | 12 | 11 | 0 | 1919 | 1766 | 108.7 | 48 | |
| 10 | Adelaide | 23 | 11 | 12 | 0 | 2193 | 1877 | 116.8 | 44 | |
| 11 | Essendon | 23 | 11 | 12 | 0 | 1838 | 2050 | 89.7 | 44 | |
| 12 | Geelong | 23 | 10 | 12 | 1 | 2088 | 1855 | 112.6 | 42 | |
| 13 | Richmond | 23 | 10 | 12 | 1 | 1856 | 1983 | 93.6 | 42 | |
| 14 | Fremantle | 23 | 10 | 13 | 0 | 1835 | 1898 | 96.7 | 40 | |
| 15 | Gold Coast | 23 | 9 | 14 | 0 | 1839 | 2006 | 91.7 | 36 | |
| 16 | Hawthorn | 23 | 7 | 16 | 0 | 1686 | 2101 | 80.2 | 28 | |
| 17 | North Melbourne | 23 | 3 | 20 | 0 | 1657 | 2318 | 71.5 | 12 | |
| 18 | West Coast | 23 | 3 | 20 | 0 | 1418 | 2674 | 53.0 | 12 | |

Source: afl.com.au
Rules for classification: 1) points; 2) percentage; 3) number of points for
(P) Premiers

=== Awards ===
==== Club Awards ====
- Club Champion: Noah Anderson
- Player's Player: Matt Rowell
- Heritage Bank Emerging Player: Sam Flanders
- HOSTPLUS Most Professional: Levi Casboult
- Life Membership: Sam Day & Rory Thompson
- Jarrod Harbrow Community Award: Brodie McLaughlin
- SIXT Leading Goalkicker: Ben King
- Academy Players of the Year: Jed Walter

==== League Awards ====
- 22 Under 22 team: Noah Anderson

== VFL ==
Gold Coast Suns
2023 VFL season
- Coach: Josh Drummond (1st season)
- Captain: James Tsitas
- Home ground: Heritage Bank Stadium
- Home & Away: 16 wins, 2 losses, 0 draws (1st)
- Finals: Premiers
- Leading goalkicker: Chris Burgess (61)

=== Season summary ===
The 2023 VFL season was Gold Coast's first season being coached by former Brisbane Lions player Josh Drummond. The Sun's were captained by James Tsitas. Gold Coast had their best season in the VFL in 2023. The Suns only lost two games throughout the entire year.

Gold Coast won their first eight games of the season with an average margin of 38. The first game the club lost was in round nine against Werribee by two points. The Suns then won their next four games with an average margin of 78 points. In round 15, 17th placed Essendon defeated Gold Coast by a single point at Windy Hill. Gold Coast then won their last four games of the season finishing at first place at the end of the home & away season.

Gold Coast defeated Brisbane in the qualifying final by 43 points to put them in the preliminary final. In the preliminary final the Suns defeated the Box Hill Hawks by 15 points to place them in their first ever VFL grand final. Gold Coast defeated the Werribee Tigers by 19 points to become the 2023 VFL premiers for the first time.

=== 2023 playing squad ===
Gold Coast Suns reserves
| List | Academy list | Coaching staff |
|---|---|---|
| 52 Cody Harrington; 53 Josh Young; 55 Taine Dawson; 56 Jared Eckersley; 57 Nick Williams; 58 Will Derrington; 59 Morgan Ferres; 60 Marlin Corbett; 61 Campbell Lake; 70 James Frawley | 51 Jake Rogers; 53 Ben O'Brien; 54 Leo Lombard; 62 Finn Hay; 64 Will Graham | Head coach: Josh Drummond; Legend: (c) Captain(s); (vc) Vice-captain(s); (B) Category B rookie; italics - Inactive player list; Long-term injury; (ret.) Retired; Updated: 6 November 2026; Source(s): |

==== Statistics ====
| Player | No. | Games | G | B | K | H | D | M | T | HO | Milestones |
|---|---|---|---|---|---|---|---|---|---|---|---|
| Jake Rogers | 51 | 3 | 1 | 0 | 5 | 15 | 20 | 1 | 7 | 0 | VFL debut (Round 14) |
| Cody Harrington | 52 | 5 | 3 | 1 | 10 | 12 | 22 | 4 | 3 | 0 | |
| Ben O'Brien | 53 | 4 | 1 | 1 | 7 | 8 | 15 | 2 | 4 | 0 | VFL debut (Round 2) |
| Josh Young | 53 | 1 | 0 | 0 | 0 | 0 | 0 | 0 | 0 | 0 | VFL debut (Round 9) |
| Leo Lombard | 54 | 3 | 1 | 0 | 18 | 15 | 33 | 9 | 14 | 0 | VFL debut (Round 22) |
| Taine Dawson | 55 | 1 | 0 | 1 | 1 | 2 | 3 | 0 | 0 | 0 | VFL debut (Round 8) |
| Jared Eckersley | 56 | 14 | 3 | 4 | 74 | 67 | 141 | 47 | 37 | 0 | |
| Nick Williams | 57 | 5 | 0 | 0 | 23 | 10 | 33 | 14 | 1 | 0 | VFL debut (Round 5) |
| Will Derrington | 58 | 5 | 2 | 1 | 24 | 9 | 33 | 5 | 3 | 0 | VFL debut (Round 1) |
| Morgan Ferres | 59 | 2 | 0 | 0 | 5 | 4 | 9 | 1 | 3 | 0 | |
| Marlin Corbett | 60 | 5 | 2 | 1 | 18 | 28 | 46 | 10 | 4 | 0 | |
| Campbell Lake | 61 | 8 | 4 | 3 | 35 | 30 | 65 | 19 | 19 | 0 | VFL debut (Round 3) |
| Finn Hay | 62 | 3 | 1 | 0 | 9 | 9 | 18 | 4 | 4 | 0 | VFL debut (Round 15) |
| Will Graham | 64 | 4 | 2 | 0 | 15 | 24 | 39 | 13 | 11 | 0 | VFL debut (Round 14) |
| James Frawley | 70 | 0 | 0 | 0 | 0 | 0 | 0 | 0 | 0 | 0 | |

=== Results ===
Key
| H | Home game |
| A | Away game |
| N | Neutral venue game |

==== Regular season ====
Table of 2023 VFL Season Results
| Round | Date | Result | Score | | | Opponent | Score | | | Ground | | Ladder |
| Round | Date | Result | G | B | T | Opponent | G | B | T | Ground | | Ladder |
|---|---|---|---|---|---|---|---|---|---|---|---|---|
| 1 | 25 March | Won | 12 | 11 | 53 | Williamstown | 7 | 10 | 52 | Austworld Centre Oval | H | 6th |
| 2 | 2 April | Won | 28 | 14 | 182 | Geelong | 11 | 9 | 75 | Heritage Bank Stadium | H | 2nd |
| 3 | 9 April | Won | 9 | 13 | 67 | Sandringham | 6 | 14 | 50 | RSEA Park | A | 2nd |
| 4 | Bye | | | | | | | | | | | 3rd |
| 5 | 23 April | Won | 20 | 16 | 136 | North Melbourne | 12 | 8 | 80 | Heritage Bank Stadium | H | 3rd |
| 6 | 30 April | Won | 21 | 11 | 137 | Richmond | 9 | 10 | 64 | Swinburne Centre | A | 1st |
| 7 | 6 May | Won | 17 | 10 | 112 | Casey | 13 | 14 | 92 | Heritage Bank Stadium | H | 1st |
| 8 | 13 May | Won | 12 | 4 | 76 | Southport | 10 | 14 | 74 | Fankhauser Reserve | A | 1st |
| 9 | 20 May | Lost | 13 | 11 | 89 | Werribee | 14 | 7 | 91 | Avalon Airport Oval | A | 2nd |
| 10 | 27 May | Won | 21 | 16 | 142 | Footscray | 10 | 17 | 77 | TIO Stadium | N | 2nd |
| 11 | 3 June | Won | 7 | 9 | 51 | Port Melbourne | 17 | 14 | 115 | ETU Stadium | A | 2nd |
| 12 | Bye | | | | | | | | | | | 1st |
| 13 | 18 June | Won | 22 | 14 | 146 | Northern Bullants | 3 | 6 | 24 | Preston City Oval | A | 1st |
| 14 | 25 June | Won | 24 | 5 | 149 | Box Hill | 12 | 13 | 85 | Heritage Bank Stadium | H | 1st |
| 15 | 2 July | Lost | 12 | 4 | 76 | Essendon | 11 | 11 | 77 | Windy Hill | A | 1st |
| 16 | 8 July | Won | 22 | 12 | 144 | Frankston | 5 | 7 | 37 | Heritage Bank Stadium | H | 1st |
| 17 | Bye | | | | | | | | | | | 1st |
| 18 | 23 July | Won | 17 | 17 | 119 | Greater Western Sydney | 12 | 7 | 79 | Manuka Oval | A | 1st |
| 19 | 29 July | Won | 13 | 14 | 92 | Brisbane | 11 | 8 | 74 | Heritage Bank Stadium | H | 1st |
| 20 | Bye | | | | | | | | | | | 2nd |
| 21 | 12 August | Won | 19 | 8 | 122 | Sydney | 8 | 6 | 54 | SCG | A | 1st |
| 22 | 19 August | Won | 23 | 11 | 149 | Carlton | 2 | 10 | 22 | Heritage Bank Stadium | H | 1st |

==== Finals series ====
| Round | Date | Result | Score | | | Opponent | Score | | | Ground | |
| Round | Date | Result | G | B | T | Opponent | G | B | T | Ground | |
|---|---|---|---|---|---|---|---|---|---|---|---|
| 1st Qualifying Final | 2 September | Won | 19 | 13 | 127 | Brisbane | 12 | 12 | 84 | Heritage Bank Stadium | H |
| 1st Preliminary Final | 16 September | Won | 12 | 16 | 88 | Box Hill | 11 | 7 | 73 | Heritage Bank Stadium | H |
| Grand Final | 24 September | Won | 17 | 10 | 112 | Werribee | 14 | 9 | 93 | IKON Park | N |

=== Ladder ===
| Pos | Team | Pld | W | L | D | PF | PA | PP | Pts | Qualification |
|---|---|---|---|---|---|---|---|---|---|---|
| 1 | Gold Coast (R) (P) | 18 | 16 | 2 | 0 | 2137 | 1158 | 184.5 | 64 | Finals series |
| 2 | Werribee | 18 | 16 | 2 | 0 | 1747 | 1040 | 168.0 | 64 | Finals series |
| 3 | Box Hill | 18 | 14 | 4 | 0 | 1681 | 1305 | 128.8 | 56 | Finals series |
| 4 | Brisbane (R) | 18 | 13 | 4 | 1 | 1838 | 1204 | 152.7 | 54 | Finals series |
| 5 | Williamstown | 18 | 13 | 5 | 0 | 1349 | 1222 | 110.4 | 52 | Finals series |
| 6 | Footscray (R) | 18 | 12 | 6 | 0 | 1659 | 1278 | 129.8 | 48 | Finals series |
| 7 | Casey | 18 | 11 | 7 | 0 | 1607 | 1255 | 128.0 | 44 | Finals series |
| 8 | Collingwood (R) | 18 | 11 | 7 | 0 | 1620 | 1363 | 118.9 | 44 | Finals series |
| 9 | Richmond (R) | 18 | 10 | 7 | 1 | 1347 | 1359 | 99.1 | 42 | Finals series |
| 10 | North Melbourne (R) | 18 | 10 | 8 | 0 | 1505 | 1369 | 109.9 | 40 | Finals series |
| 11 | Carlton (R) | 18 | 10 | 8 | 0 | 1412 | 1326 | 106.5 | 40 | |
| 12 | Greater Western Sydney (R) | 18 | 9 | 9 | 0 | 1454 | 1658 | 87.7 | 36 | |
| 13 | Geelong (R) | 18 | 8 | 9 | 1 | 1247 | 1549 | 80.5 | 34 | |
| 14 | Southport | 18 | 8 | 10 | 0 | 1494 | 1384 | 107.9 | 32 | |
| 15 | Port Melbourne | 18 | 6 | 12 | 0 | 1270 | 1512 | 84.0 | 24 | |
| 16 | Sandringham | 18 | 5 | 12 | 1 | 1298 | 1482 | 87.6 | 22 | |
| 17 | Essendon (R) | 18 | 5 | 13 | 0 | 1263 | 1545 | 81.7 | 20 | |
| 18 | Sydney (R) | 18 | 4 | 14 | 0 | 1241 | 1651 | 75.2 | 16 | |
| 19 | Frankston | 18 | 4 | 14 | 0 | 1112 | 1566 | 71.0 | 16 | |
| 20 | Northern Bullants | 18 | 2 | 16 | 0 | 844 | 2088 | 40.4 | 8 | |
| 21 | Coburg | 18 | 0 | 18 | 0 | 1022 | 1833 | 55.8 | 0 | |

Source: afl.com.au
Rules for classification: 1) points; 2) percentage; 3) number of points for
(R) = Reserves
(P) Premiers

== AFLW ==
Gold Coast Suns
2023 AFLW season
- Coach: Cameron Joyce (3rd season)
- Captains: Tara Bohanna (2nd season)
- Home ground: Heritage Bank Stadium
- Home & Away: 6 wins, 3 losses, 1 draw (5th)
- Finals: Elimination Final
- Best & Fairest: Claudia Whitfort
- Leading goalkicker: Jamie Stanton

=== Season summary ===
Cameron Joyce coached his third season at Gold Coast and Tara Bohanna was their captain for her second consecutive season.

The Sun's lost their first match of the season against Carlton by only two points but were able to win their next three matches. Gold Coast won two of their next three matches and then drew against Port Adelaide at Alberton Oval in round eight. The Suns won their next two matches and then ended the season with a loss against eighth place Sydney.

=== Pre Season ===
Gold Coast were defeated by Sydney in a match simulation at Heritage Bank Stadium. Cameron Joyce kicked five of the last six goals of the game. In an official practice match the Suns versed Brisbane at Brighton Homes Arena.

=== Coaching staff ===
2023 Gold Coast AFLW coaching staff
| Role | Name |
|---|---|
| Senior Coach | Cameron Joyce |
| Assistant Coach - Midfielders | Sam Iles |
| Assistant Coach - Defenders | Jarrod Wells |
| Assistant Coach - Forwards | Jennifer Revell |
| Development Coach | Brooks Mustey |
| Development Coach | Kieran Davey |

=== Playing List ===
==== Changes ====
Deletions from Playing List
| Player | Reason | Ref. |
|---|---|---|
| Courtney Jones | Trade to Richmond | |
| Ellie Hampson | Trade to Brisbane | |
| Serene Watson | Trade to St Kilda | |
| Tori Groves-Little | Delisted | |
| Jade Pregelj | Delisted | |
| Annise Bradfield | Delisted | |
| Shannon Danckert | Delisted | |
| Krystal Scott | Retired | |
| Ashlee Atkins | Retired | |

Additions to Playing List
| Player | Reason | Ref. |
|---|---|---|
| Clara Fitzpatrick | Trade from St Kilda | |
| Jordan Membrey | Trade from Collingwood | |
| Ella Maurer | Trade from North Melbourne | |
| Maddy Brancatisano | Trade from Richmond | |
| Cara McCrossan | No 6, 2023 Draft | |
| Meara Girvan | No 10, 2023 Draft | |

==== Statistics ====
| Player | No. | Games | G | B | K | H | D | T | M | HO |
|---|---|---|---|---|---|---|---|---|---|---|
| Jasmyn Smith | 1 | 1 | 0 | 0 | 1 | 8 | 9 | 0 | 2 | 0 |
| Lauren Bella | 2 | 11 | 0 | 0 | 48 | 34 | 82 | 13 | 21 | 257 |
| Darcie Davies | 3 | 10 | 3 | 0 | 25 | 33 | 58 | 20 | 20 | 89 |
| Claudie Whitfort | 4 | 11 | 4 | 4 | 142 | 128 | 270 | 21 | 76 | 0 |
| Maddy Brancatisano | 5 | 11 | 1 | 2 | 64 | 79 | 143 | 22 | 44 | 0 |
| Elise Barwick | 6 | 5 | 0 | 0 | 7 | 8 | 15 | 2 | 12 | 0 |
| Lauren Ahrens | 7 | 11 | 0 | 0 | 78 | 34 | 112 | 29 | 21 | 0 |
| Charlie Rowbottom | 8 | 9 | 2 | 2 | 125 | 117 | 242 | 26 | 86 | 0 |
| Clara Fitzpatrick | 9 | 8 | 0 | 0 | 35 | 45 | 80 | 19 | 17 | 5 |
| Ella Maurer | 10 | 4 | 0 | 0 | 8 | 23 | 31 | 2 | 8 | 0 |
| Niamh McLaughlin | 11 | 11 | 4 | 3 | 56 | 68 | 124 | 16 | 15 | 0 |
| Tara Bohanna | 12 | 11 | 15 | 14 | 74 | 25 | 99 | 29 | 15 | 11 |
| Lucy Single | 13 | 10 | 0 | 1 | 105 | 59 | 164 | 12 | 81 | 0 |
| Cara McCrossan | 14 | 4 | 0 | 0 | 11 | 13 | 24 | 2 | 8 | 0 |
| Wallis Randell | 15 | 9 | 0 | 0 | 65 | 20 | 85 | 18 | 20 | 0 |
| Gabrielle Biedenweg-Webster | 16 | 2 | 0 | 0 | 8 | 4 | 12 | 1 | 3 | 0 |
| Jamie Stanton | 17 | 11 | 16 | 4 | 52 | 14 | 66 | 17 | 29 | 0 |
| Georgia Clayden | 18 | 11 | 2 | 2 | 72 | 52 | 124 | 28 | 22 | 0 |
| Ashanti Bush | 19 | 3 | 0 | 1 | 10 | 4 | 14 | 1 | 5 | 0 |
| Daisy D'Arcy | 20 | 11 | 1 | 2 | 106 | 64 | 170 | 19 | 49 | 0 |
| Jordan Membrey | 21 | 5 | 4 | 1 | 14 | 22 | 36 | 7 | 5 | 0 |
| Kalinda Howarth | 23 | 1 | 0 | 0 | 10 | 5 | 15 | 5 | 1 | 0 |
| Alana Gee | 24 | 7 | 1 | 0 | 41 | 23 | 64 | 9 | 15 | 0 |
| Meara Girvan | 25 | 10 | 1 | 0 | 56 | 59 | 115 | 27 | 20 | 0 |
| Jacqueline Dupuy | 27 | 11 | 13 | 7 | 93 | 54 | 147 | 40 | 25 | 66 |
| Elizabeth Keaney | 30 | 11 | 0 | 3 | 93 | 62 | 155 | 33 | 32 | 0 |
| Alison Drennan | 33 | 11 | 0 | 1 | 120 | 101 | 221 | 18 | 57 | 0 |
| Tahlia Meyer | 34 | 3 | 0 | 0 | 11 | 11 | 22 | 4 | 8 | 0 |
| Vivien Saad | 39 | 8 | 0 | 0 | 57 | 42 | 99 | 28 | 19 | 0 |

=== Results ===
Key
| H | Home game |
| A | Away game |

Table of 2023 AFLW Season Results
| Round | Date | Result | Score | | | Opponent | Score | | | Ground | | Attendance | Ladder |
| Round | Date | Result | G | B | T | Opponent | G | B | T | Ground | | Attendance | Ladder |
|---|---|---|---|---|---|---|---|---|---|---|---|---|---|
| 1 | 2 September | Lost | 4 | 48 | 32 | Carlton | 5 | 4 | 34 | IKON Park | A | 3,244 | 10th |
| 2 | 9 September | Won | 15 | 9 | 99 | West Coast | 4 | 2 | 26 | Heritage Bank Stadium | H | 1,071 | 6th |
| 3 | 17 September | Won | 5 | 3 | 33 | Collingwood | 2 | 9 | 21 | Victoria Park | A | 2,537 | 4th |
| 4 | 24 September | Won | 7 | 6 | 48 | Western Bulldogs | 7 | 2 | 44 | Heritage Bank Stadium | H | 1,181 | 6th |
| 5 | 1 October | Lost | 2 | 3 | 15 | Adelaide | 7 | 5 | 47 | Thomas Farms Oval | A | 3,300 | 5th |
| 6 | 8 October | Won | 5 | 6 | 36 | Richmond | 5 | 5 | 35 | IKON Park | A | 1,848 | 5th |
| 7 | 14 October | Lost | 3 | 3 | 21 | Brisbane | 8 | 9 | 57 | Heritage Bank Stadium | H | 1,873 | 7th |
| 8 | 21 October | Drawn | 7 | 3 | 45 | Port Adelaide | 7 | 3 | 45 | Alberton Oval | A | 1,853 | 7th |
| 9 | 27 October | Won | 7 | 6 | 48 | Greater Western Sydney | 2 | 5 | 17 | Heritage Bank Stadium | H | 1,045 | 6th |
| 10 | 3 November | Won | 6 | 3 | 39 | Essendon | 3 | 7 | 25 | Great Barrier Reef Arena | H | 2,131 | 5th |

Table of 2023 AFLW finals results
| Round | Date | Result | Score | | | Opponent | Score | | | Ground | | Attendance |
| Round | Date | Result | G | B | T | Opponent | G | B | T | Ground | | Attendance |
|---|---|---|---|---|---|---|---|---|---|---|---|---|
| Elimination Final | 11 November | Lost | 6 | 5 | 41 | Sydney | 9 | 4 | 58 | Heritage Bank Stadium | H | 2,710 |

| Pos | Team | Pld | W | L | D | PF | PA | PP | Pts | Qualification |
|---|---|---|---|---|---|---|---|---|---|---|
| 1 | Adelaide | 10 | 9 | 1 | 0 | 599 | 314 | 190.8 | 36 | Finals series |
| 2 | Melbourne | 10 | 8 | 2 | 0 | 653 | 293 | 222.9 | 32 | Finals series |
| 3 | North Melbourne | 10 | 7 | 3 | 0 | 478 | 213 | 224.4 | 28 | Finals series |
| 4 | Brisbane (P) | 10 | 7 | 3 | 0 | 505 | 339 | 149.0 | 28 | Finals series |
| 5 | Gold Coast | 10 | 6 | 3 | 1 | 416 | 351 | 118.5 | 26 | Finals series |
| 6 | Geelong | 10 | 6 | 4 | 0 | 449 | 318 | 141.2 | 24 | Finals series |
| 7 | Essendon | 10 | 6 | 4 | 0 | 379 | 354 | 107.1 | 24 | Finals series |
| 8 | Sydney | 10 | 6 | 4 | 0 | 462 | 432 | 106.9 | 24 | Finals series |
| 9 | St Kilda | 10 | 6 | 4 | 0 | 408 | 399 | 102.3 | 24 | |
| 10 | Richmond | 10 | 5 | 5 | 0 | 382 | 379 | 100.8 | 20 | |
| 11 | Collingwood | 10 | 5 | 5 | 0 | 331 | 399 | 83.0 | 20 | |
| 12 | Carlton | 10 | 4 | 6 | 0 | 361 | 420 | 86.0 | 16 | |
| 13 | Fremantle | 10 | 4 | 6 | 0 | 289 | 402 | 71.9 | 16 | |
| 14 | Hawthorn | 10 | 3 | 7 | 0 | 307 | 456 | 67.3 | 12 | |
| 15 | Port Adelaide | 10 | 2 | 7 | 1 | 404 | 538 | 75.1 | 10 | |
| 16 | Greater Western Sydney | 10 | 2 | 8 | 0 | 316 | 596 | 53.0 | 8 | |
| 17 | West Coast | 10 | 2 | 8 | 0 | 269 | 530 | 50.8 | 8 | |
| 18 | Western Bulldogs | 10 | 1 | 9 | 0 | 320 | 595 | 53.8 | 4 | |

Source: afl.com.au
Rules for classification: 1) points; 2) percentage; 3) number of points for
(P) Premiers
