= 2025 Gold Coast Suns season =

Gold Coast Suns
2025 AFL season
- Coach: Damien Hardwick (2nd season)
- Captains: Noah Anderson (1st season)
- Home ground: People First Stadium
- Practice Match: Lost by 21 points
- Highest home attendance: 18,034
- Lowest home attendance: 16,211
- Average home attendance: 17,123

The 2025 Gold Coast Suns season is Gold Coast's 15th season competing in the Australian Football League (AFL) and 17th overall. Gold Coast continues to field an AFL reserves team in the Victorian Football League (VFL) and Academy teams in the Talent League Boys and Talent League Girls competitions. Gold Coast will also field a women's team in the AFL Women's (AFLW) competition.

== Club news ==
Ben Long and Joel Jeffrey were selected in the Indigenous All-Stars squad for the preseason exhibition match against Fremantle.

== AFL team ==
=== Season summary ===
It is the club's 2nd AFL season under senior coach Damien Hardwick, with Noah Anderson appointed as the new club captain.

The club was due to host the opening round match at People First Stadium against Essendon, but the match was postponed on 4 March due to the impact of Severe Tropical Cyclone Alfred on the South East Queensland region. On 6 March, the AFL announced that the match would be included during round 24 of the season.

In their round 2 match against West Coast at Optus Stadium, the Suns recorded their biggest win in club history, defeating their opponents by 87 points.

=== Pre-season ===
In an unofficial match simulation, Gold Coast defeated Collingwood by 18 points, and Brisbane Lions by 10 points at People First Stadium. Sydney defeated Gold Coast in the official AFL practice match by 21 points. The game was played at People First Stadium

=== Coaching staff ===
Damien Hardwick continued as the club's men's senior coach for the 2nd season.

2025 Gold Coast coaching staff
Role	Name
Senior Coach	Damien Hardwick
Assistant Coach	Shaun Grigg
Assistant Coach	Josh Drummond
Assistant Coach - Forward	Brad Miller
Head of Development	Tate Kaesler
Development Coach	Nick Malceski
Development Coach	Richard Douglas
Head of Development	Hugh Greenwood

=== 2025 playing squad ===
Gold Coast Suns 2025 playing squad
Senior list		Coaching staff
1 Mac Andrew; 2 John Noble; 3 Sam Flanders; 4 Jed Walter; 5 Alex Davies; 6 Alex Sexton; 7 Nick Holman; 8 Brayden Fiorini; 9 Ben Ainsworth; 10 Charlie Ballard; 11 Touk Miller (vc); 12 Elliott Himmelberg; 14 Lachie Weller; 15 Noah Anderson (c); 16 Tom Berry; 17 Daniel Rioli; 18 Matt Rowell; 19 Bailey Humphrey; 20 Ethan Read; 21 Ned Moyle; 22 Ben Long	23 Sean Lemmens; 24 David Swallow; 25 Sam Collins (vc); 26 Will Graham; 27 Wil Powell; 28 Jarrod Witts; 29 Jake Rogers; 30 Leo Lombard; 31 Cooper Bell; 32 Bodhi Uwland; 33 Sam Clohesy; 34 Ben King; 35 Connor Budarick; 36 Zak Evans; 37 Max Knobel; 38 Lloyd Johnston; 39 Lachlan Gulbin; 40 Joel Jeffrey; 41 Malcolm Rosas Jr; 42 Asher Eastham; 44 Ben Jepson; 46 Caleb Graham; 50 Jy Farrar	Head coach: Damien Hardwick; Assistant coaches: Shaun Grigg; Josh Drummond; Brad Miller (Forward); Tate Kaesler (VFL Head Coach/Head of Development); Nick Malceski (Development Coach); Richard Douglas (Development Coach); Hugh Greenwood (Development Coach); Legend: (c) Captain(s); (vc) Vice-captain(s); (B) Category B rookie; italics - Inactive player list; Long-term injury; (ret.) Retired; Updated: Source(s): ,

==== Changes ====
Deletions from playing list
Player	Reason
Rory Atkins	Trade to Port Adelaide
Sandy Brook	Delisted
Levi Casboult	Retired
Sam Day	Delisted
Brandon Ellis	Retired
Oskar Faulkhead	Delisted
Jack Lukosius	Trade to Port Adelaide
Darcy Macpherson	Delisted
Jack Mahony	Delisted
Hewago Oea	Delisted
Will Rowlands	Delisted
James Tsitas	Delisted

Additions to playing list
Player	Reason
Cooper Bell	No 49, 2024 National Draft
Asher Eastham	Rookie Draft
Zak Evans	Category B Rookie
Lachlan Gulbin	Category B Rookie
Elliott Himmelberg	Free agent from Adelaide
Ben Jepson	Pre-Season Supplemental Selection Period
Max Knobel	Rookie Draft
Leo Lombard	No 9, 2024 National Draft, Academy
John Noble	Trade from Collingwood
Daniel Rioli	Trade from Richmond

=== Results ===
Keys
H	Home game
A	Away game
N	Neutral venue game

Table of 2025 AFL Season Results
Round	Date	Result	Score			Opponent	Score			Ground		Attendance	Ladder
Round	Date	Result	G	B	T	Opponent	G	B	T	Ground		Attendance	Ladder
OR	Match vs Essendon postponed to a later date												11th
1	16 March	Won	20	16	136	West Coast	7	7	49	Optus Stadium	A	46,532	3rd
2	Bye												6th
3	29 March	Won	18	12	120	Melbourne	8	14	62	MCG	A	24,506	4th
4	5 April	Won	13	13	91	Adelaide	14	6	90	People First Stadium	H	16,211	3rd
5	12 April	Won	21	15	141	North Melbourne	13	11	89	Barossa Park	N	9,317	2nd
6	19 April	Lost	9	15	69	Richmond	12	8	80	Marvel Stadium	A	18,423	3rd
7	27 April	Won	17	15	117	Sydney	12	7	79	Heritage Bank Stadium	H	18,034	3rd
8	4 May	Lost	7	7	49	Brisbane Lions	9	12	66	Gabba	A	33,612	4th
9	10 May	Won	15	16	106	Western Bulldogs	14	12	96	TIO Stadium	N	9,816	4th
10	15 May	Won	16	8	104	Hawthorn	15	6	96	TIO Stadium	N	12,314	3rd
11	25 May	Won	12	8	80	St Kilda	8	13	61	Marvel Stadium	A	13,486	3rd
12	31 May	Lost	9	10	64	Fremantle	11	9	75	People First Stadium	H	11,750	4th
13	7 June	Lost	5	7	37	Geelong	9	7	61	GMHBA Stadium	A	29,502	5th
14	Bye												6th
15	22 June	Lost	14	15	99	Greater Western Sydney	16	10	106	ENGIE Stadium	A	10,504	9th
16	28 June	Won	15	14	104	Melbourne	12	13	85	People First Stadium	H	13,064	8th
17	5 July	Won	18	7	115	Essendon	11	8	74	Marvel Stadium	A	29,672	7th
18	11 July	Won	10	9	69	Collingwood	8	15	63	People First Stadium	H	22,831	5th
19	20 July	Lost	6	10	46	Adelaide	16	11	107	Adelaide Oval	A	44,249	8th
20	26 July	Won	20	10	130	Brisbane Lions	9	10	64	People First Stadium	H	20,833	8th
21	2 August	Won	16	11	107	Richmond	2	11	23	People First Stadium	H	14,841	6th
22	9 August	Won	13	15	93	Carlton	11	6	74	Marvel Stadium	A	24,120	6th
23	16 August	Lost	11	10	76	Greater Western Sydney	17	9	111	People First Stadium	H	16,007	9th
24	22 August	Lost	9	13	67	Port Adelaide	10	11	71	Adelaide Oval	A	40,897	9th
24 (OR)	27 August	Won	23	15	153	Essendon	8	10	58	People First Stadium	H	40,897	7th

=== Ladder ===
Pos	Team	Pld	W	L	D	PF	PA	PP	Pts	Qualification
1	Adelaide	23	18	5	0	2278	1635	139.3	72	Finals series
2	Geelong	23	17	6	0	2425	1714	141.5	68	Finals series
3	Brisbane Lions (P)	23	16	6	1	2061	1804	114.2	66	Finals series
4	Collingwood	23	16	7	0	1991	1627	122.4	64	Finals series
5	Greater Western Sydney	23	16	7	0	2114	1834	115.3	64	Finals series
6	Fremantle	23	16	7	0	1978	1815	109.0	64	Finals series
7	Gold Coast	23	15	8	0	2173	1740	124.9	60	Finals series
8	Hawthorn	23	15	8	0	2045	1691	120.9	60	Finals series
9	Western Bulldogs	23	14	9	0	2493	1820	137.0	56	
10	Sydney	23	12	11	0	1845	1902	97.0	48	
11	Carlton	23	9	14	0	1799	1861	96.7	36	
12	St Kilda	23	9	14	0	1839	2077	88.5	36	
13	Port Adelaide	23	9	14	0	1705	2136	79.8	36	
14	Melbourne	23	7	16	0	1902	2038	93.3	28	
15	Essendon	23	6	17	0	1535	2209	69.5	24	
16	North Melbourne	23	5	17	1	1805	2365	76.3	22	
17	Richmond	23	5	18	0	1449	2197	66.0	20	
18	West Coast	23	1	22	0	1466	2438	60.1	4	

Source: afl.com.au
Rules for classification: 1) points; 2) percentage; 3) number of points for
(P) Premiers

== VFL team ==
Gold Coast Suns
2025 VFL season
- Coach: Tate Kaesler
- Captain: James Tsitas
- Home ground: People First Stadium

=== Season summary ===
Tate Kaesler continues as coach of the club's VFL program, with James Tsitas appointed as captain.

In March, captain James Tsitas was selected in the initial 43-player squad for the VFL State Team to play the SANFL State Team in April.

=== Results ===
Keys
H	Home game
A	Away game
N	Neutral venue game

Table of 2025 VFL Season Results
Round	Date	Result	Score			Opponent	Score			Ground		Ladder
Round	Date	Result	G	B	T	Opponent	G	B	T	Ground		Ladder
1	Bye											20th
2	29 March	Lost	13	10	88	Casey	13	12	90	Casey Fields	A	14th
3	5 April	Won	25	14	164	Northern Bullants	5	9	39	People First Stadium	H	10th
4	19 April	Lost	8	8	56	Southport	16	15	111	Fankhauser Reserve	A	13th
5	27 April	Won	14	9	93	Sydney	6	10	46	People First Stadium	H	11th
6	4 May	Lost	14	9	93	Brisbane Lions	14	11	95	Brighton Homes Arena	A	13th
7	Bye											
8	17 May					Box Hill				People First Stadium	H	
9	25 May					Sandringham				RSEA Park	A	
10	31 May					Coburg				People First Stadium	H	
11	8 June					Geelong				GMHBA Stadium	A	
12	Bye											
13	22 June					Greater Western Sydney				Blacktown ISP Oval	A	
14	TBC					Casey				TBC	H	
15	TBC					Essendon				TBC	A	
16	TBC					Collingwood				TBC	H	
17	TBC					Port Melbourne				TBC	A	
18	TBC					Brisbane Lions				TBC	H	
19	TBC					Richmond				TBC	H	
20	TBC					Carlton				TBC	A	
21	TBC					Greater Western Sydney				TBC	H	

=== Ladder ===
Pos	Team	Pld	W	L	D	PF	PA	PP	Pts
12	Geelong (R)	18	9	9	0	1472	1466	100.4	36
13	Carlton (R)	18	8	10	0	1387	1586	87.5	32
14	Gold Coast (R)	18	7	10	1	1466	1493	98.2	30
15	North Melbourne (R)	18	7	10	1	1500	1528	98.2	30
16	Werribee	18	7	11	0	1325	1378	96.2	28

Source: AFL.com.au
Rules for classification: 1) points; 2) percentage; 3) number of points for
(R) Club is the reserves team of a senior club of the Australian Football League

== AFL Women's team ==
Gold Coast Suns
2025 AFL Women's season
- Coach: Rhyce Shaw (1st season)
- Captains: Niamh McLaughlin & Lucy Single
- Home ground: People First Stadium

=== Season summary ===
After the sacking of Cam Joyce at the end of the previous season, the Suns announced Rhyce Shaw to begin his first season as head coach.

=== Coaching staff ===
Rhyce Shaw will begin his first season as head coach of the AFLW program.

2025 Gold Coast Suns coaching staff
Role	Name
Senior coach	Rhyce Shaw
Senior Assistant coach	Sam Iles
Assistant coach	Rory Thompson

=== Results ===
Fixture yet to be released
