= Brancatisano =

Brancatisano is an Italian surname. Notable people with the surname include:

- Maddy Brancatisano (born 2000), Australian rules footballer
- Richard Brancatisano (born 1983), Australian television actor and musician
