= Courtney Jones (Australian footballer) =

Australian rules football player (born 2000)

Personal information
- Full name: Courtney Jones
- Born: 10 September 2000 (age 26)
- Original team: Southern Saints (VFLW)
- Height: 169 cm (5 ft 7 in)
- Position: Forward

Playing career^{1}
Years	Club	Games (Goals)
2022 (S6)	Carlton	9 (8)
2022 (S7)	Gold Coast	9 (8)
2023–2024	Richmond	11 (9)
Total		29 (25)
- ^{1} Playing statistics correct to the end of 2024.

Courtney Jones (born 10 September 2000) is an Australian rules footballer who played for Carlton, Gold Coast and Richmond in the AFL Women's (AFLW).

== AFL Women's career ==
Jones began her AFLW career at Carlton and was traded to the Gold Coast Suns in June 2022.

In March 2023, Jones was traded to Richmond in a straight swap for Maddy Brancatisano. The reason for the trade was because Jones needed to return to Melbourne to be close to her younger sister who was diagnosed with thyroid cancer in January.

Jones was delisted at the conclusion of the 2024 AFL Women's season.

== Statistics ==
Statistics are correct to the end of 2024.

Legend
G	Goals	K	Kicks	D	Disposals	T	Tackles
B	Behinds	H	Handballs	M	Marks

Season	Team	No.	Games	Totals							Averages (per game)							Votes
Season	Team	No.	Games	G	B	K	H	D	M	T	G	B	K	H	D	M	T	Votes
2022 (S6)	Carlton	22	9	8	5	53	32	85	22	20	0.9	0.6	5.9	3.6	9.5	2.4	2.2	0
2022 (S7)	Gold Coast	5	9	8	7	49	42	91	16	29	0.9	0.8	5.4	4.7	10.1	1.8	3.2	0
2023	Richmond	5	10	8	3	29	29	58	17	16	0.8	0.3	2.9	2.9	5.8	1.7	1.6	0
2024	Richmond	5	1	1	1	2	1	3	1	2	1.0	1.0	2.0	1.0	3.0	1.0	2.0	0
Career			29	25	16	133	104	237	56	67	0.9	0.6	4.6	3.6	8.2	1.9	2.3	0
