= Wil Powell =

Australian rules footballer (born 1999)

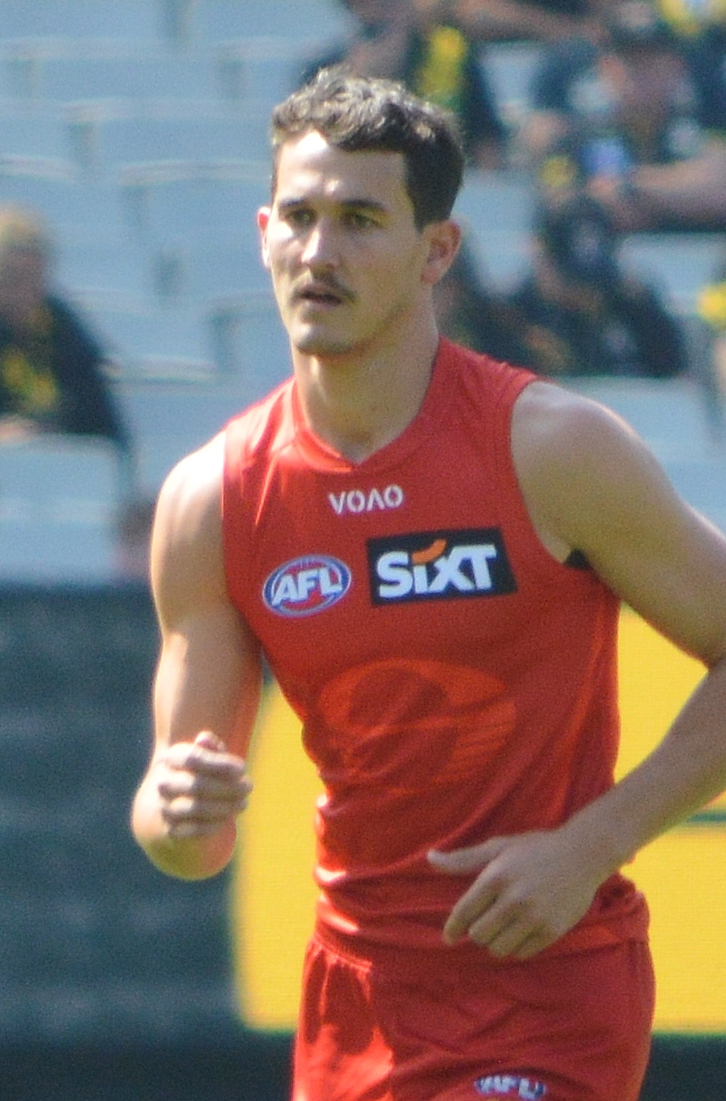
- Powell playing for Gold Coast in March 2026

Personal information
- Full name: Wil Carlos Powell
- Born: 26 August 1999 (age 27)
- Original team: Claremont Tigers (WAFL)
- Draft: 19, 2017 national draft
- Debut: June 30, 2018, Gold Coast vs. Collingwood, at Carrara Stadium
- Height: 185 cm (6 ft 1 in)
- Weight: 70 kg (154 lb)
- Position: Defender

Club information
- Current club: Gold Coast
- Number: 27

Playing career^{1}
Years	Club	Games (Goals)
2018–	Gold Coast	149 (21)

Representative team honours
Years	Team	Games (Goals)
2026	Western Australia	1 (0)
- ^{1} Playing statistics correct to the end of round 22, 2026.

Wil Carlos Powell (born 26 August 1999) is a professional Australian rules footballer playing for the Gold Coast Suns in the Australian Football League (AFL). He made his debut in Round 15 of the 2018 season against the Collingwood Magpies at Carrara Stadium and scored a goal with his first kick.

== Early football ==
Powell grew up in Scarborough, Western Australia. His grandfather Roy Powell played in three premierships with the East Perth Football Club.

Powell played Colts football for the Claremont Tigers in the West Australian Football League (WAFL). He averaged 14 disposals and kicked eight goals from 18 games and was invited to test at the Western Australian State Combine. Powell was selected by the Suns with pick 19 in the 2017 national draft, their first selection. He was described as a "shock pick" and a "bolter"; Claremont had earlier posted a list of possible draftees from the club on Twitter, but Powell was not included.

== AFL career ==
In May 2018, Powell extended his contract with the Suns to 2021. His 2022 season ended early with a compound fracture to his ankle.

=== Homophobic slur and suspension ===
In 2024, the AFL reported that he would be banned for five matches after he made a homophobic slur. It was the third instance in 2024 of a homophobic slur being said by an AFL player or coach. After the slur was made, it was made public that Powell had previously made numerous homophobic posts on social media. Melbourne captain Max Gawn said it was "embarrassing" for Powell to call himself an AFL player in light of the controversy. AFL General Counsel Stephen Meade said, "It is extremely disappointing to be dealing with a similar incident in only a matter of weeks."

== Statistics ==
Updated to the end of round 22, 2026.

Legend
G	Goals	K	Kicks	D	Disposals	T	Tackles
B	Behinds	H	Handballs	M	Marks

Season	Team	No.	Games	Totals							Averages (per game)							Votes
Season	Team	No.	Games	G	B	K	H	D	M	T	G	B	K	H	D	M	T	Votes
2018	Gold Coast	27	7	2	4	37	24	61	18	14	0.3	0.6	5.3	3.4	8.7	2.6	2.0	0
2019	Gold Coast	27	13	7	5	88	70	158	46	35	0.5	0.4	6.8	5.4	12.2	3.5	2.7	0
2020 (Note: The 2020 season was played with 17 home-and-away matches per team (down from 22) and 16-minute quarters with time on (down from 20-minute quarters with time on) due to the impact of the COVID-19 pandemic.)	Gold Coast	27	15	2	0	102	95	197	49	25	0.1	0.0	6.8	6.3	13.1	3.3	1.7	0
2021	Gold Coast	27	22	1	1	259	132	391	115	54	0.0	0.0	11.8	6.0	17.8	5.2	2.5	0
2022	Gold Coast	27	12	1	6	136	40	176	43	29	0.1	0.5	11.3	3.3	14.7	3.6	2.4	0
2023	Gold Coast	27	18	0	3	275	90	365	115	42	0.0	0.2	15.3	5.0	20.3	6.4	2.3	0
2024	Gold Coast	27	18	2	3	220	112	332	97	42	0.1	0.2	12.2	6.2	18.4	5.4	2.3	0
2025	Gold Coast	27	25	1	4	236	169	405	120	76	0.0	0.2	9.4	6.8	16.2	4.8	3.0	0
2026	Gold Coast	27	19	5	7	193	136	329	92	73	0.3	0.4	10.2	7.2	17.3	4.8	3.8	0
Career			149	21	33	1546	868	2414	695	390	0.1	0.2	10.4	5.8	16.2	4.7	2.6	0
