= Malcolm Rosas =

Australian rules footballer (born 2001)

Personal information
- Full name: Malcolm Rosas Jr.
- Nickname: Mango
- Born: 27 June 2001 (age 25); Darwin, Northern Territory
- Original teams: Darwin Buffaloes (NTFL); NT Thunder (NEAFL)
- Draft: Academy Pre-Selection, 2019 AFL draft, Gold Coast
- Height: 180 cm (5 ft 11 in)
- Weight: 73 kg (161 lb)
- Position: Forward

Club information
- Current club: Sydney
- Number: 10

Playing career^{1}
Years	Club	Games (Goals)
2020–2025	Gold Coast	49 (46)
2026–	Sydney	16 (16)
Total		65 (62)
- ^{1} Playing statistics correct to the end of round 22, 2026.

Malcolm Rosas Jr. (born 27 June 2001) is a professional Australian rules footballer who plays for the Sydney Swans in the Australian Football League (AFL), having initially been drafted by Gold Coast.

== Early life ==
Rosas Jr was born and raised in Darwin, Northern Territory. His mother is of Indigenous Australian descent from the Northern Territory (Ngalakgan and Rembarrnga) and his father is of South Sea Islander descent from Queensland. Rosas Jr's grandfather, Bill Dempsey, is a 2022 Australian Football Hall of Fame inductee, an inaugural Hall of Fame inductee in both the WAFL and AFL Northern Territory as well as being named in the Indigenous Team of the Century in 2005.

Rosas Jr grew up playing Australian rules football, rugby league and soccer at high levels but eventually chose to focus on football in his mid-teenage years. He played all his junior football for the Darwin Buffaloes in the NTFL and signed to play senior football for the NT Thunder in the NEAFL in his final year of junior football in 2019. He was the first player signed by the Gold Coast Suns Academy program via their Darwin Academy, signing a 2-year deal until 2021.

== AFL career ==
In October 2019, Rosas Jr was drafted to the Gold Coast Suns via their academy pre-selection access. He made his AFL debut at 19 years of age in round 9, 2021 against the Brisbane Lions in QClash 20 at Metricon Stadium.

Rosas Jr played 49 matches for the Suns over six seasons with the club and then requested a trade to the Sydney Swans at the end of the 2025 season. His trade was completed on 7 October.

== Statistics ==
Updated to the end of round 22, 2026.

Legend
G	Goals	K	Kicks	D	Disposals	T	Tackles
B	Behinds	H	Handballs	M	Marks

Season	Team	No.	Games	Totals							Averages (per game)							Votes
Season	Team	No.	Games	G	B	K	H	D	M	T	G	B	K	H	D	M	T	Votes
2020 (Note: The 2020 season was played with 17 home-and-away matches per team (down from 22) and 16-minute quarters with time on (down from 20-minute quarters with time on) due to the impact of the COVID-19 pandemic.)	Gold Coast	41	0	—	—	—	—	—	—	—	—	—	—	—	—	—	—	0
2021	Gold Coast	41	4	0	4	14	5	19	5	6	0.0	1.0	3.5	1.3	4.8	1.3	1.5	0
2022	Gold Coast	41	15	14	7	77	63	140	27	46	0.9	0.5	5.1	4.2	9.3	1.8	3.1	0
2023	Gold Coast	41	19	19	17	109	68	177	38	42	1.0	0.9	5.7	3.6	9.3	2.0	2.2	0
2024	Gold Coast	41	7	12	6	38	13	51	14	11	1.7	0.9	5.4	1.9	7.3	2.0	1.6	0
2025	Gold Coast	41	4	1	4	17	6	23	5	5	0.3	1.0	4.3	1.5	5.8	1.3	1.3	0
2026	Sydney	10	16	16	2	85	57	142	23	40	1.0	0.1	5.3	3.6	8.9	1.4	2.5	0
Career			65	62	40	340	212	552	112	150	1.0	0.6	5.2	3.3	8.5	1.7	2.3	0
