= James Tsitas =

Australian rules footballer

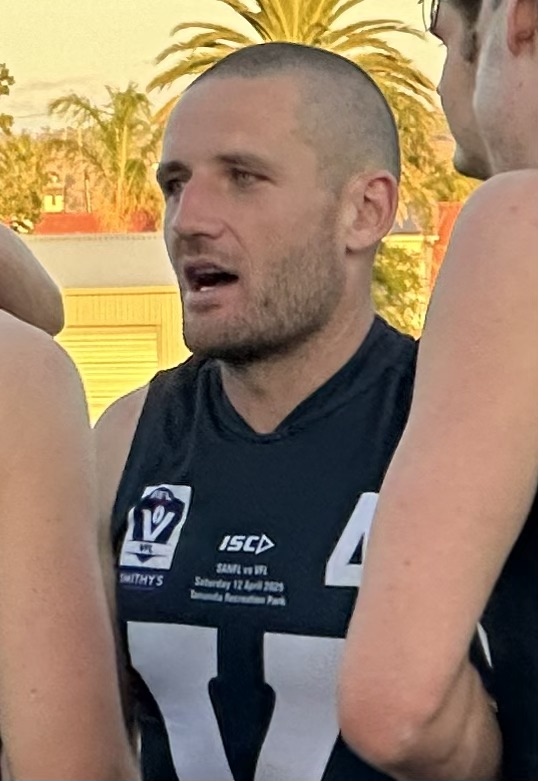
- Tsitas in 2025

Personal information
- Full name: James Tsitas
- Born: 3 March 1995 (age 31); Geelong, Victoria, Australia
- Original team: Grovedale Football Club/North Ballarat Football Club/Geelong Football Club (VFL)/Woodville-West Torrens Football Club
- Draft: Pre-season supplemental selection period, 2021 AFL draft
- Height: 181 cm (5 ft 11 in)
- Weight: 83 kg (183 lb)
- Position: Forward

Club information
- Current club: Gold Coast reserves
- Number: 43

Playing career^{1}
Years	Club	Games (Goals)
2022–2024	Gold Coast	5 (3)
- ^{1} Playing statistics correct to the end of 2024.

Career highlights
- Geelong (VFL) best and fairest: 2017; SANFL premiership player: 2020, 2021; Magarey Medal: 2021

James Tsitas (born 3 March 1995) is an Australian rules footballer who currently plays for the Gold Coast Suns in the Victorian Football League (VFL), having previously played for the Gold Coast Suns in the Australian Football League (AFL) and the Woodville-West Torrens Football Club in the South Australian National Football League (SANFL).

== Early career ==
Originally from Geelong, Victoria, he played for Grovedale Football Club as a junior, before joining the TAC Cup representative side Geelong Falcons. He would go undrafted in the 2013 AFL draft and would sign with the North Ballarat Football Club in the VFL. He would play two seasons for the Roosters until joining the Geelong Football Club VFL side for the 2016 VFL season, where he would win the club Best and Fairest the following season.

For the 2020 season, he would sign for Williamstown Football Club, but due to the COVID-19 pandemic and the suspension of the 2020 VFL season, he would instead sign with Woodville-West Torrens in the SANFL for the 2020. This would culminate in Tsitas being awarded the Magarey Medal in 2021, as well as 2 premierships in 2020 and 2021.

On the back of these performances, Tsitas would be selected in the 2021 AFL draft as part of the Pre-season supplemental selection period by the Gold Coast Suns.

== AFL career ==
After joining the Suns for the 2022 AFL season, Tsitas would spend the majority of the season in the VFL, before being selected to make his AFL debut in the Round 16 match against Collingwood.

Tsitas kicked his first career goal in Round 9 of the 2023 AFL season after he was subbed into the game. He ended up kicking 2 goals in a 70 point thrashing against the West Coast. The win was Gold Coast’s biggest win outside of Queensland. This was also Tsitas’ first win in the AFL.

He would only play four games in the 2023 season, all as a substitute. However, he captained the club's VFL side to their first premiership, although he missed the Grand Final due to a one week ban for striking in the preliminary final. He was unable to add to his AFL games tally in the 2024 under new coach Damien Hardwick, and was delisted at the end of the season following the VFL team's wildcard round exit to Frankston. He remains on the Gold Coast, captaining the Suns’ VFL side for the 2025 season, along with being a specialist coach at the club.

== Statistics ==
Statistics are correct to the end of the 2024 season

Legend
G	Goals	K	Kicks	D	Disposals	T	Tackles
B	Behinds	H	Handballs	M	Marks

Season	Team	No.	Games	Totals							Averages (per game)							Votes
Season	Team	No.	Games	G	B	K	H	D	M	T	G	B	K	H	D	M	T	Votes
2022	Gold Coast	21	1	0	0	3	2	5	3	1	0	0	3	2	5	3	1	0
2023	Gold Coast	21	4	3	0	10	9	19	8	4	0.75	0	2.5	2.25	4.75	2	1	0
2024	Gold Coast	21	0	0	0	0	0	0	0	0	0	0	0	0	0	0	0	0
Career			5	0	0	13	11	24	11	5	0.6	0.0	2.6	2.2	4.8	2.2	1.0	0
