= Darcy Macpherson =

Australian rules footballer

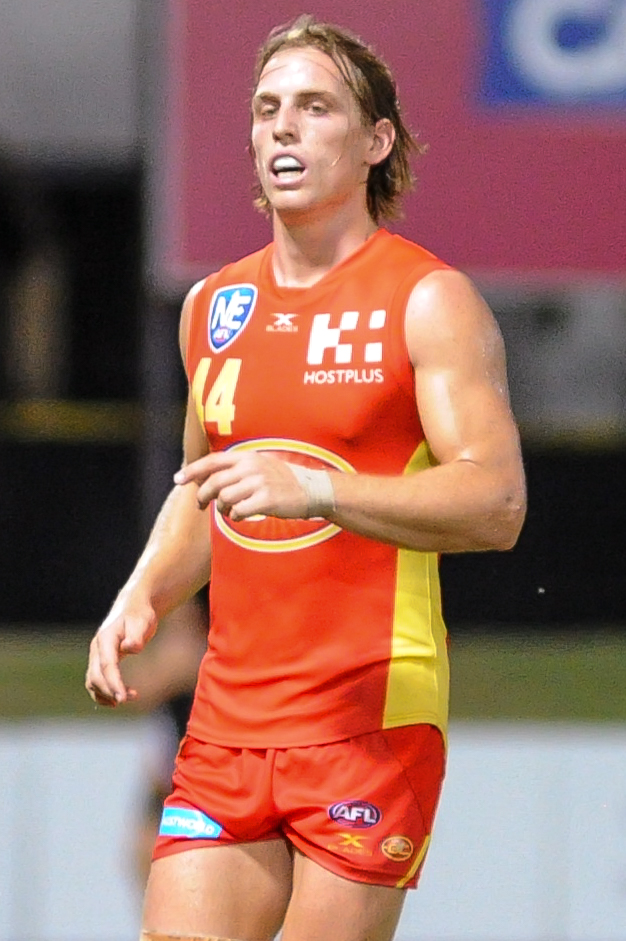
- Macpherson playing for Gold Coast in May 2017

Personal information
- Nickname: Darca
- Born: 29 October 1997 (age 29)
- Original team: Northern Knights (TAC Cup)
- Draft: No. 21, 2016 rookie draft
- Debut: Round 7, 2016, Gold Coast vs. Melbourne, at Metricon Stadium
- Height: 174 cm (5 ft 9 in)
- Weight: 72 kg (159 lb)
- Position: Midfielder

Club information
- Current club: Gold Coast
- Number: 44

Playing career
| Years | Club | Games (Goals) |
| 2016–2024 | Gold Coast | 97 (29) |

Darcy Macpherson (born 29 October 1997) is a former professional Australian rules footballer who played for the Gold Coast Football Club in the Australian Football League (AFL). He is the son of former Footscray player, Stephen Macpherson. He was drafted by the Gold Coast Football Club with their second selection and twenty-first overall in the 2016 rookie draft. He made his debut in the 73-point loss against Melbourne in round 7, 2016, at Metricon Stadium.

== Statistics ==
Legend
| G | Goals | K | Kicks | D | Disposals | T | Tackles |
| B | Behinds | H | Handballs | M | Marks |

| Season | Team | No. | Games | Totals | | | | | | | Averages (per game) | | | | | | | Votes |
| Season | Team | No. | Games | G | B | K | H | D | M | T | G | B | K | H | D | M | T | Votes |
|---|---|---|---|---|---|---|---|---|---|---|---|---|---|---|---|---|---|---|
| 2016 | Gold Coast | 44 | 4 | 2 | 2 | 24 | 23 | 47 | 8 | 22 | 0.5 | 0.5 | 6.0 | 5.8 | 11.8 | 2.0 | 5.5 | 0 |
| 2017 | Gold Coast | 44 | 8 | 3 | 3 | 47 | 47 | 94 | 27 | 25 | 0.4 | 0.4 | 5.9 | 5.9 | 11.8 | 3.4 | 3.1 | 0 |
| 2018 | Gold Coast | 44 | 5 | 4 | 2 | 54 | 16 | 70 | 16 | 27 | 0.8 | 0.4 | 10.8 | 3.2 | 14.0 | 3.2 | 5.4 | 0 |
| 2019 | Gold Coast | 44 | 22 | 12 | 9 | 262 | 149 | 411 | 91 | 134 | 0.5 | 0.4 | 11.9 | 6.8 | 18.7 | 4.1 | 6.1 | 0 |
| 2020 (Note: The 2020 season was played with 17 home-and-away matches per team (down from 22) and 16-minute quarters with time on (down from 20-minute quarters with time on) due to the impact of the COVID-19 pandemic.) | Gold Coast | 44 | 12 | 4 | 0 | 80 | 58 | 138 | 26 | 33 | 0.3 | 0.0 | 6.7 | 4.8 | 11.5 | 2.2 | 2.8 | 0 |
| 2021 | Gold Coast | 44 | 11 | 1 | 6 | 98 | 60 | 158 | 48 | 43 | 0.1 | 0.5 | 8.9 | 5.5 | 14.4 | 4.4 | 3.9 | 0 |
| 2022 | Gold Coast | 44 | 10 | 0 | 1 | 66 | 40 | 106 | 24 | 25 | 0.0 | 0.1 | 6.6 | 4.0 | 10.6 | 2.4 | 2.5 | 0 |
| 2023 | Gold Coast | 44 | 23 | 3 | 2 | 306 | 135 | 441 | 128 | 48 | 0.1 | 0.1 | 13.3 | 5.9 | 19.2 | 5.6 | 2.1 | 0 |
| 2024 | Gold Coast | 44 | 2 | 0 | 0 | 1 | 2 | 3 | 0 | 1 | 0.0 | 0.0 | 0.5 | 1.0 | 1.5 | 0.0 | 0.5 | 0 |
| 2025 | Gold Coast | 44 | 0 | — | — | — | — | — | — | — | — | — | — | — | — | — | — | 0 |
| Career | | | 97 | 29 | 25 | 938 | 530 | 1468 | 368 | 358 | 0.3 | 0.3 | 9.7 | 5.5 | 15.1 | 3.8 | 3.7 | 0 |
