= Jack Lukosius =

Australian rules football player

Personal information
- Born: 9 August 2000 (age 26); Adelaide, South Australia
- Original team: Woodville-West Torrens (SANFL)/Henley Football Club
- Draft: No. 2, 2018 national draft
- Debut: 24 March 2019, Gold Coast vs. St Kilda, at Marvel Stadium
- Height: 195 cm (6 ft 5 in)
- Weight: 83 kg (183 lb)
- Position: Defender / Forward

Club information
- Current club: Port Adelaide
- Number: 12

Playing career^{1}
Years	Club	Games (Goals)
2019–2024	Gold Coast	116 (79)
2025–	Port Adelaide	15 (14)
Total		131 (93)
- ^{1} Playing statistics correct to the end of 2026.

Career highlights
- 2x 22under22 team: (2020,2021)

Jack Lukosius (born 9 August 2000) is a professional Australian rules footballer playing for the Port Adelaide Football Club in the Australian Football League (AFL). He previously played for the Gold Coast Suns, the club to which he was drafted, from 2019 to 2024.

== Early life ==
Lukosius was born in Adelaide, South Australia. His father, Robert, is of Lithuanian origin and played professional football for Woodville-West Torrens in the SANFL.

Jack participated in the Auskick program at Henley and grew up playing high level Australian rules football and cricket in Adelaide for Fulham Cricket Club while attending Henley High School with future Gold Coast teammate Izak Rankine. Such was his talent in cricket, he was selected as the opening bowler for South Australia at the 2016-17 U17 national carnival but gave the sport away soon after to focus on football. He made his senior SANFL debut for Woodville-West Torrens in a 2017 preliminary final against Sturt where he finished with 12 disposals, 8 marks and 4 goals.

Leading into his final year of junior football, Lukosius was considered a potential number-one draft pick by many draft analysts and drew comparisons to superstar St Kilda forward Nick Riewoldt. In 2018, he played a big part in South Australia's U18 national championships victory and Henley High School's SA schools championship. He also played for Woodville's senior SANFL side but would once again play in a losing preliminary final that year. He was drafted by Gold Coast with their first selection in the 2018 national draft, which was the second pick overall.

== AFL career ==
=== Gold Coast ===
Lukosius made his AFL debut in Gold Coast's one-point loss to St Kilda in the opening round of the 2019 AFL season.

In Round 3, 2023, Lukosius kicked a career high five goals including a 73-metre inswinging goal with a drop punt to help secure a 19-point Suns victory over the reigning premier Geelong. He played his 100th game in 2024 during the win over Hawthorn. He played in defence for much of the 2024 AFL season, but often swung forward to finish the year with 23 goals from 21 games.

=== Port Adelaide ===
Following the 2024 season, Lukosius requested a trade back to his home state of South Australia to play with Port Adelaide, and was traded on 15 October despite having two years remaining on his contract. His first year at the Power was "wretched year of injury", only managing seven games through back and calf injuries.. He looked to improve upon a poor 2025 showing, making appearances in four of the first five matches in 2026 and kicking six goals, but he was then sidelined for another two months with an ongoing groin issue.

== Statistics ==
Updated to the end of round 22, 2026.

Legend
G	Goals	K	Kicks	D	Disposals	T	Tackles
B	Behinds	H	Handballs	M	Marks

Season	Team	No.	Games	Totals							Averages (per game)							Votes
Season	Team	No.	Games	G	B	K	H	D	M	T	G	B	K	H	D	M	T	Votes
2019	Gold Coast	41	21	3	4	183	54	237	90	44	0.1	0.2	8.7	2.6	11.3	4.3	2.1	0
2020 (Note: The 2020 season was played with 17 home-and-away matches per team (down from 22) and 16-minute quarters with time on (down from 20-minute quarters with time on) due to the impact of the COVID-19 pandemic.)	Gold Coast	13	17	3	3	220	59	279	62	27	0.2	0.2	12.9	3.5	16.4	3.6	1.6	3
2021	Gold Coast	13	22	3	11	382	60	442	172	32	0.1	0.5	17.4	2.7	20.1	7.8	1.5	2
2022	Gold Coast	13	13	8	14	143	33	176	62	28	0.6	1.1	11.0	2.5	13.5	4.8	2.2	0
2023	Gold Coast	13	22	39	22	256	41	297	140	24	1.8	1.0	11.6	1.9	13.5	6.4	1.1	8
2024	Gold Coast	13	21	23	18	199	66	265	103	25	1.1	0.9	9.5	3.1	12.6	4.9	1.2	2
2025	Port Adelaide	12	7	8	5	47	16	63	30	9	1.1	0.7	6.7	2.3	9.0	4.3	1.3	0
2026	Port Adelaide	12	8	6	4	74	18	92	45	18	0.8	0.5	9.3	2.3	11.5	5.6	2.3	0
Career			131	93	81	1504	347	1851	704	207	0.7	0.6	11.5	2.6	14.1	5.4	1.6	15
