= Sean Lemmens =

Australian rules footballer

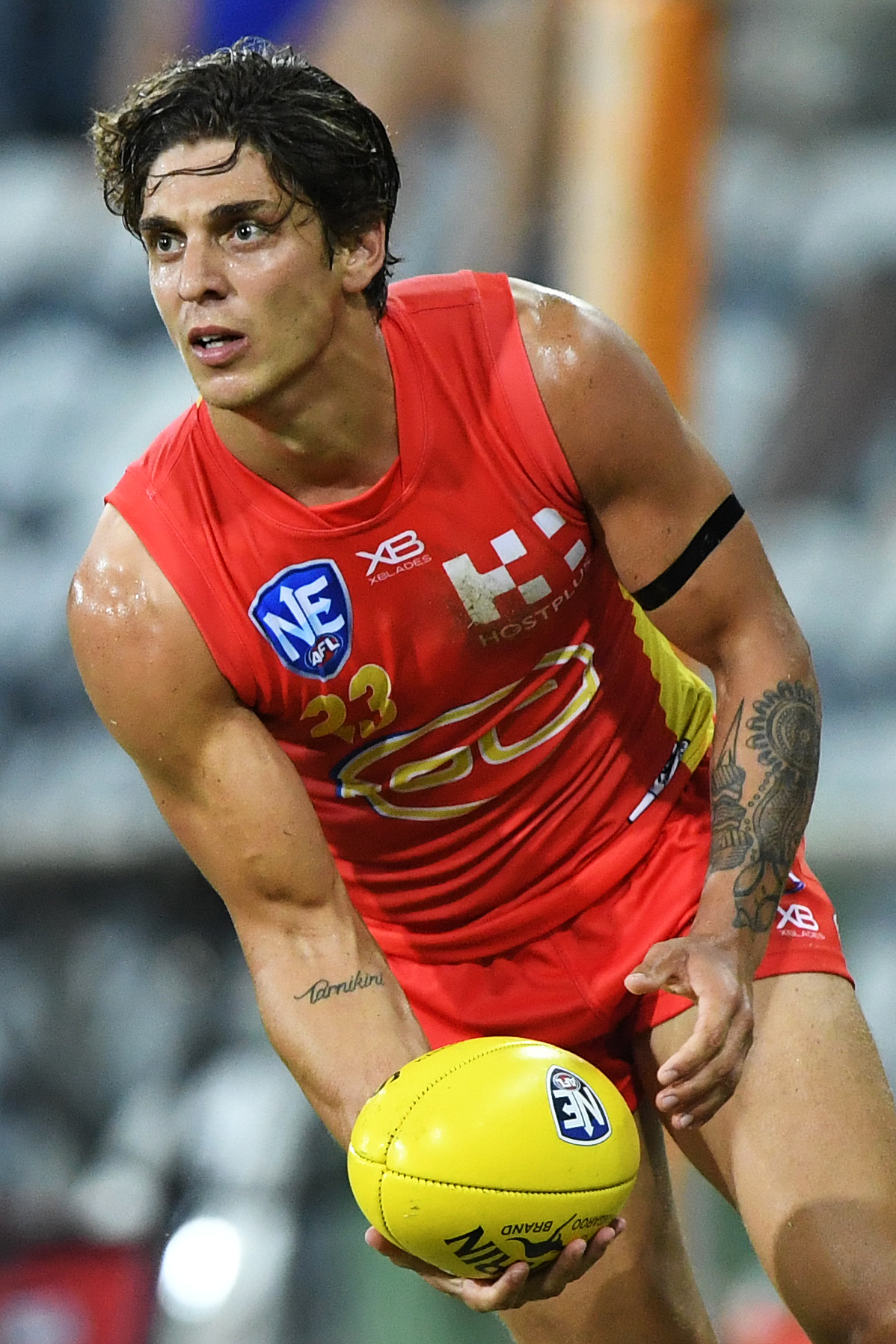
- Lemmens playing for Gold Coast in May 2019

Personal information
- Full name: Sean Lemmens
- Born: 2 November 1994 (age 32)
- Original team: Port Adelaide (SANFL)
- Draft: No. 27, 2013 National Draft (Gold Coast)
- Height: 184 cm (6 ft 0 in)
- Weight: 81 kg (179 lb)
- Position: Medium Defender

Playing career
Years	Club	Games (Goals)
2014–2025	Gold Coast	149 (25)

Representative team honours
Years	Team	Games (Goals)
	Indigenous All-Stars	1 (0)

Sean Lemmens (born 2 November 1994) is a former Australian rules footballer who played for Gold Coast Football Club in the Australian Football League. He is of Indigenous Australian heritage.

== Early career ==
Lemmens was born into a family of Indigenous Australian descent (Tiwi). He began playing junior football for the Salisbury Football Club and moved to the Port Adelaide Magpies. He progressed his way through the junior ranks at Port Adelaide before solidifying a reserves spot in the 2013. He debuted for the Magpies senior team in the final round of the 2013 SANFL season. He was also selected to represent South Australia in the 2013 AFL Under 18 Championships, where he was noticed by Gold Coast defensive coach, Dean Solomon.

Leading into the 2013 AFL draft, Lemmens was considered by some to be a rookie chance at best. He was drafted with the 27th pick in the 2013 National Draft by the Gold Coast Suns.

== AFL career ==
Lemmens made his senior debut for the Suns against Richmond in Round 1 of the 2014 season.

Lemmens played 148 AFL matches for the Suns over 12 seasons, before retiring at the end of the 2025 AFL season.

== Personal life ==
Lemmens' partner is former Gold Coast teammate Izak Rankine's cousin and Lemmens' daughter is Rankine's second niece.

== Statistics ==
Legend
G	Goals	K	Kicks	D	Disposals	T	Tackles
B	Behinds	H	Handballs	M	Marks

Season	Team	No.	Games	Totals							Averages (per game)							Votes
Season	Team	No.	Games	G	B	K	H	D	M	T	G	B	K	H	D	M	T	Votes
2014	Gold Coast	40	18	3	0	145	90	235	40	41	0.2	0.0	8.1	5.0	13.1	2.2	2.3	0
2015	Gold Coast	40	18	3	4	102	89	191	51	52	0.2	0.2	5.7	4.9	10.6	2.8	2.9	0
2016	Gold Coast	23	13	1	2	93	76	169	43	30	0.1	0.2	7.2	5.8	13.0	3.3	2.3	0
2017	Gold Coast	23	20	9	13	124	122	246	48	60	0.5	0.7	6.2	6.1	12.3	2.4	3.0	0
2018	Gold Coast	23	10	1	7	65	48	113	22	37	0.1	0.7	6.5	4.8	11.3	2.2	3.7	0
2019	Gold Coast	23	8	4	1	55	29	84	15	36	0.5	0.1	6.9	3.6	10.5	1.9	4.5	0
2020 (Note: The 2020 season was played with 17 home-and-away matches per team (down from 22) and 16-minute quarters with time on (down from 20-minute quarters with time on) due to the impact of the COVID-19 pandemic.)	Gold Coast	23	6	4	0	29	19	48	7	9	0.7	0.0	4.8	3.2	8.0	1.2	1.5	0
2021	Gold Coast	23	21	0	0	196	72	268	76	44	0.0	0.0	9.3	3.4	12.8	3.6	2.1	0
2022	Gold Coast	23	20	0	0	184	59	243	79	50	0.0	0.0	9.2	3.0	12.2	4.0	2.5	0
2023	Gold Coast	23	11	0	1	83	22	105	38	19	0.0	0.1	7.5	2.0	9.5	3.5	1.7	0
2024	Gold Coast	23	3	0	0	24	13	37	6	9	0.0	0.0	8.0	4.3	12.3	2.0	3.0	0
2025	Gold Coast	23	1	0	0	4	6	10	1	2	0.0	0.0	4.0	6.0	10.0	1.0	2.0	0
Career			149	25	28	1104	645	1749	426	389	0.2	0.2	7.4	4.3	11.7	2.9	2.6	0
