= Jy Farrar =

Australian rules footballer (born 1996)

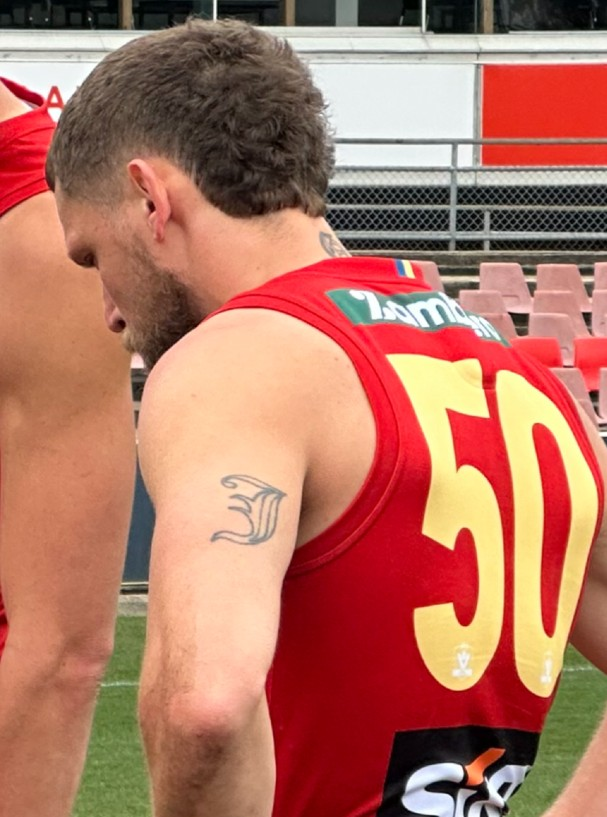
- Farrar in July 2026

Personal information
- Full name: Jy Farrar
- Born: 7 December 1996 (age 29); Halls Creek, Western Australia
- Original team: Adelaide (SANFL)
- Draft: No. 60, 2019 AFL draft
- Debut: 20 September 2020, Gold Coast vs. Hawthorn, at Adelaide Oval
- Height: 190 cm (6 ft 3 in)
- Weight: 77 kg (170 lb)
- Position: Forward

Club information
- Current club: Gold Coast
- Number: 50

Playing career^{1}
Years	Club	Games (Goals)
2020–	Gold Coast	45 (14)
- ^{1} Playing statistics correct to the end of round 22, 2026.

Career highlights
- VFL premiership player: 2023

Jy Farrar (born 7 December 1996) is an Australian rules footballer playing for the Gold Coast Suns in the Australian Football League. The Gold Coast Suns selected Farrar with pick 60 in the 2019 NAB AFL draft. Farrar is the cousin of AFLW player Kitara Whap-Farrar, as well as the cousin of Melbourne player Shane McAdam.

== Early life ==
Farrar was born in Halls Creek, Western Australia into a family of Indigenous Australian descent (Bunuba, Jaru and Kija). He moved to Perth at the age of 14, where he attended boarding school. After spending 5 years in Perth, Farrar moved to Wangaratta in regional Victoria, where he played for North Wangaratta Football Club, winning the best and fairest. Not long after, he moved to Adelaide, in order to play for the Scotch Old Collegians Football Club. From there, Farrar played 2 games for Adelaide's SANFL side, where he kicked 2 goals.

== AFL career ==
Farrar debuted in Gold Coast's 51 point loss to Hawthorn in the 18th round of the 2020 AFL season. On debut, Farrar kicked 1 goal, collected 6 disposals, and took 2 marks.

== Statistics ==
Updated to the end of round 22, 2026.

Legend
G	Goals	K	Kicks	D	Disposals	T	Tackles
B	Behinds	H	Handballs	M	Marks

Season	Team	No.	Games	Totals							Averages (per game)							Votes
Season	Team	No.	Games	G	B	K	H	D	M	T	G	B	K	H	D	M	T	Votes
2020 (Note: The 2020 season was played with 17 home-and-away matches per team (down from 22) and 16-minute quarters with time on (down from 20-minute quarters with time on) due to the impact of the COVID-19 pandemic.)	Gold Coast	50	1	1	0	3	3	6	2	1	1.0	0.0	3.0	3.0	6.0	2.0	1.0	0
2021	Gold Coast	50	10	0	0	90	55	145	56	14	0.0	0.0	9.0	5.5	14.5	5.6	1.4	0
2022	Gold Coast	50	14	1	0	123	48	171	64	21	0.1	0.0	8.8	3.4	12.2	4.6	1.5	0
2023	Gold Coast	50	9	1	1	48	29	77	21	17	0.1	0.1	5.3	3.2	8.6	2.3	1.9	0
2024	Gold Coast	50	0	—	—	—	—	—	—	—	—	—	—	—	—	—	—	0
2025	Gold Coast	50	8	10	8	46	29	75	31	22	1.3	1.0	5.8	3.6	9.4	3.9	2.8	0
2026	Gold Coast	50	3	1	1	6	8	14	4	5	0.3	0.3	2.0	2.7	4.7	1.3	1.7	0
Career			45	14	10	316	172	488	178	80	0.3	0.2	7.0	3.8	10.8	4.0	1.8	0
