= Joel Jeffrey =

Australian rules footballer (born 2002)

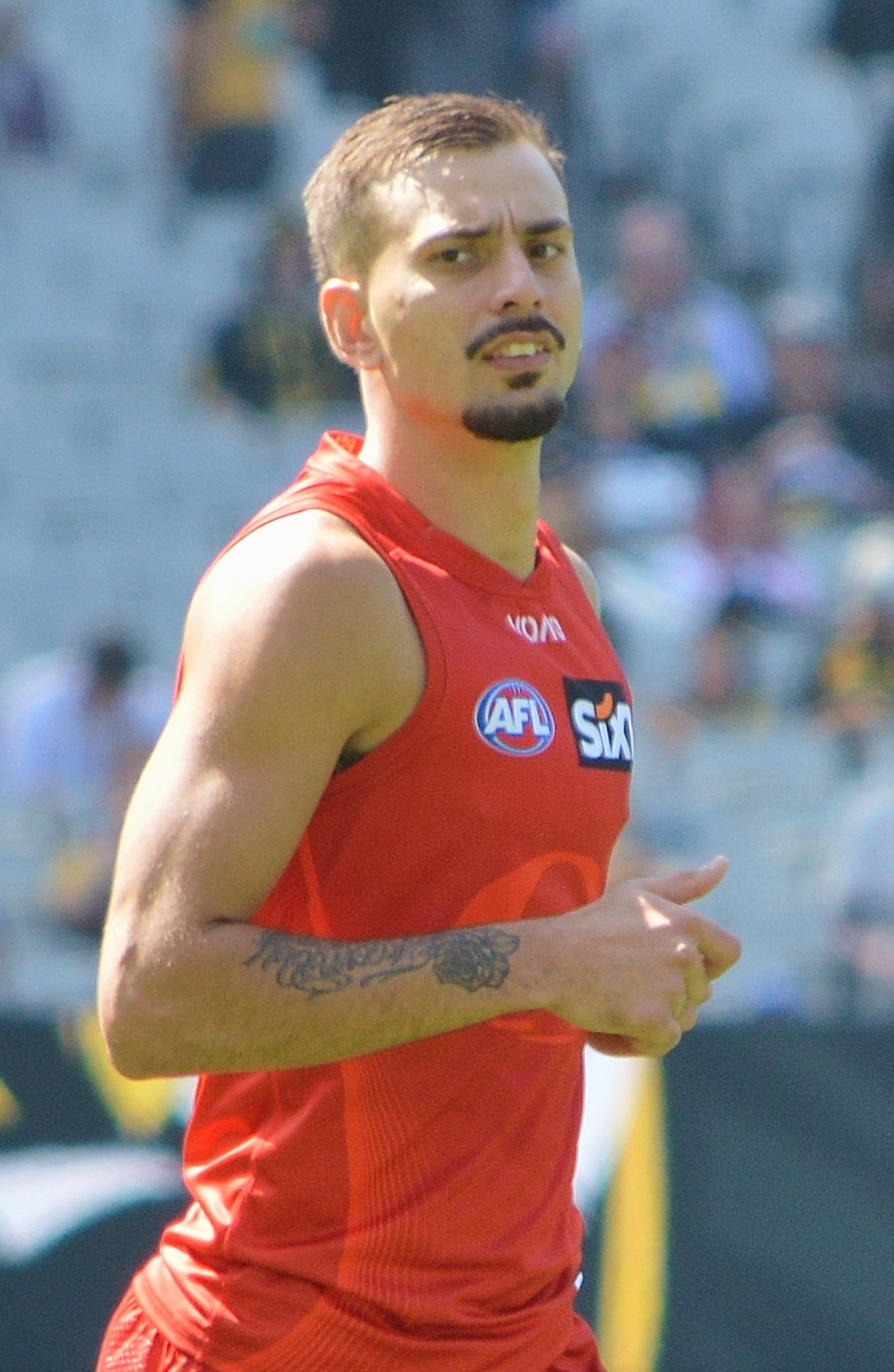
- Jeffrey in March 2026

Personal information
- Full name: Joel Sudar-Jeffrey
- Born: 12 March 2002 (age 24); Darwin, Northern Territory
- Original teams: Wanderers (NTFL); NT Thunder (NEAFL)
- Draft: 2020 pre-draft selection
- Debut: Round 20, 2021, Gold Coast vs. Melbourne, at Docklands Stadium
- Height: 194 cm (6 ft 4 in)
- Weight: 89 kg (196 lb)
- Position: Defender

Club information
- Current club: Gold Coast
- Number: 16

Playing career^{1}
Years	Club	Games (Goals)
2021–	Gold Coast	73 (28)

Representative team honours
Years	Team	Games (Goals)
2025	Indigenous All-Stars	1 (0)
- ^{1} Playing statistics correct to the end of round 22, 2026.

Career highlights
- VFL premiership player: 2023; AFL Rising Star nominee: 2022

Joel Jeffrey (born 12 March 2002) is a professional Australian rules footballer who plays for the Gold Coast Football Club in the Australian Football League (AFL).

== Early life ==
Jeffrey was born into a Darwin-based family of Indigenous Australian descent from the Northern Territory (Wulwulam) and Queensland (Kukatj). His father, Russell, was a professional Australian rules footballer who played at the highest level for St Kilda before relocating to the Gold Coast to continue his AFL career with the Brisbane Bears. Following his retirement, Russell returned to Darwin to play for Wanderers and coached Palmerston to back-to-back NTFL premierships in 2001–02. He was inducted into the AFLNT Hall of Fame in 2010.

Joel began playing junior football for Palmerston and later switched to the Wanderers Football Club where he made his Men's Premier League debut for the club in 2018 at 16 years of age. In June 2019, at 17 years of age, Jeffrey made his senior NEAFL debut for the NT Thunder at TIO Stadium and kicked a goal in his first game. He was also selected to represent the Allies at the 2019 AFL Under 18 Championships as a bottom ager and intended to relocate to the Gold Coast in 2020 to take part in the Gold Coast Suns Academy program on a full-time basis until the COVID-19 pandemic eliminated that possibility. In December 2020, Jeffrey was drafted to the Gold Coast Suns via their academy access.

== AFL career ==
Jeffrey spent the first half of the 2021 season playing for Gold Coast in the VFL and notably kicked a winning goal after the siren to defeat the Sydney Swans after marking the ball one handed with seconds to go in the game. He impressed again a month later with a 9-goal, best on ground performance in the VFL, which earned him an AFL debut the following week against the Melbourne Demons at Metricon Stadium. In his sixth AFL game, Jeffrey remarkably kicked five goals against the Western Bulldogs, which included a Goal of the Year nomination that involved an intercept and a snap over his head. He was awarded a 2022 AFL Rising Star nomination for his performance.

Jeffrey was a member of the Gold Coast team in the Victorian Football League (VFL) which won the 2022 VFL Grand Final over Werribee.

When head coach Damien Hardwick arrived at the Suns, Jeffrey found himself in a new role, playing as a rebounding medium defender. A successful shift, he played a career-best 12 AFL games in the 2024 season. He collected a personal best 29 disposals in round 13 against St Kilda. In 2025, Jeffrey was awarded with representative honours in the Indigenous All-Stars team which played against Fremantle in February, following in the footsteps of father Russell who played in the same team 31 years prior.

== Statistics ==
Updated to the end of round 22, 2026.

Legend
G	Goals	K	Kicks	D	Disposals	T	Tackles
B	Behinds	H	Handballs	M	Marks

Season	Team	No.	Games	Totals							Averages (per game)							Votes
Season	Team	No.	Games	G	B	K	H	D	M	T	G	B	K	H	D	M	T	Votes
2021	Gold Coast	40	4	2	4	19	6	25	6	4	0.5	1.0	4.8	1.5	6.3	1.5	1.0	0
2022	Gold Coast	40	5	8	3	40	10	50	17	8	1.6	0.6	8.0	2.0	10.0	3.4	1.6	0
2023	Gold Coast	40	7	5	4	54	13	67	16	23	0.7	0.6	7.7	1.9	9.6	2.3	3.3	0
2024	Gold Coast	40	12	1	2	132	67	199	44	14	0.1	0.2	11.0	5.6	16.6	3.7	1.2	0
2025	Gold Coast	40	25	5	5	323	148	471	140	55	0.2	0.2	12.9	5.9	18.8	5.6	2.2	0
2026	Gold Coast	16	20	7	2	244	106	350	107	35	0.4	0.1	12.2	5.3	17.5	5.4	1.8	0
Career			73	28	20	812	350	1162	330	139	0.4	0.3	11.1	4.8	15.9	4.5	1.9	0
