= Charlie Ballard =

Australian rules footballer (born 1999)

- Ballard in 2026

Personal information
- Nickname: Chook
- Born: 23 July 1999 (age 27)
- Original team: Sturt (SANFL)
- Draft: No. 42, 2017 national draft
- Debut: 5 May 2018, Gold Coast vs. Western Bulldogs, at Mars Stadium
- Height: 196 cm (6 ft 5 in)
- Weight: 95 kg (209 lb)
- Position: Tall defender

Club information
- Current club: Gold Coast
- Number: 10

Playing career^{1}
Years	Club	Games (Goals)
2018-	Gold Coast	143 (3)
- ^{1} Playing statistics correct to the end of round 22, 2026.

Charlie Ballard (born 23 July 1999) is a professional Australian rules footballer playing for the Gold Coast Suns in the Australian Football League (AFL).

== Early life ==
Charlie participated in the Auskick program at Mitcham, South Australia.

Ballard played in their under-18 premiership for the Sturt Football Club in the SANFL as well as for Sacred Heart College. Standing 180cm at the time, Ballard averaged 18 disposals on the wing in the 2017 AFL Under 18 Championships, playing for South Australia. He ran 3.05 seconds in the 20 m (66 ft) sprint at the AFL Draft Combine, and was touted as a top-30 selection at the 2017 AFL draft.

== AFL career ==
Ballard was selected by Gold Coast with pick 42, their 3rd-round selection.

He made his AFL debut in round 7 of the 2018 season, in the nine-point loss against the Western Bulldogs at Mars Stadium. He kicked one goal on debut. Ballard's first game was praised by coach Stuart Dew, along with fellow debutant Brayden Crossley.

Ballard played his 100th game in 2023. Following a successful 2024 season with the Suns, he signed a contract extension until the end of 2029.

In round one of the 2025 season, Ballard suffered a ruptured anterior cruciate ligament in his left knee, subsequently ruling him for the rest of the season.

== Statistics ==
Updated to the end of round 22, 2026.

Legend
G	Goals	K	Kicks	D	Disposals	T	Tackles
B	Behinds	H	Handballs	M	Marks

Season	Team	No.	Games	Totals							Averages (per game)							Votes
Season	Team	No.	Games	G	B	K	H	D	M	T	G	B	K	H	D	M	T	Votes
2018	Gold Coast	31	11	1	2	79	34	113	39	15	0.1	0.2	7.2	3.1	10.3	3.5	1.4	0
2019	Gold Coast	10	21	0	1	211	63	274	111	23	0.0	0.0	10.0	3.0	13.0	5.3	1.1	0
2020 (Note: The 2020 season was played with 17 home-and-away matches per team (down from 22) and 16-minute quarters with time on (down from 20-minute quarters with time on) due to the impact of the COVID-19 pandemic.)	Gold Coast	10	16	0	0	114	44	158	68	13	0.0	0.0	7.1	2.8	9.9	4.3	0.8	0
2021	Gold Coast	10	21	0	0	227	61	288	140	25	0.0	0.0	10.8	2.9	13.7	6.7	1.2	3
2022	Gold Coast	10	18	0	1	177	49	226	109	22	0.0	0.1	9.8	2.7	12.6	6.1	1.2	0
2023	Gold Coast	10	23	1	0	230	63	293	142	29	0.0	0.0	10.0	2.7	12.7	6.2	1.3	0
2024	Gold Coast	10	23	1	0	184	94	278	111	28	0.0	0.0	8.0	4.1	12.1	4.8	1.2	1
2025	Gold Coast	10	1	0	0	5	1	6	3	1	0.0	0.0	5.0	1.0	6.0	3.0	1.0	0
2026	Gold Coast	10	9	0	0	47	32	79	33	8	0.0	0.0	5.2	3.6	8.8	3.7	0.9	0
Career			143	3	4	1274	441	1715	756	164	0.0	0.0	8.9	3.1	12.0	5.3	1.1	4
