= Bailey Humphrey =

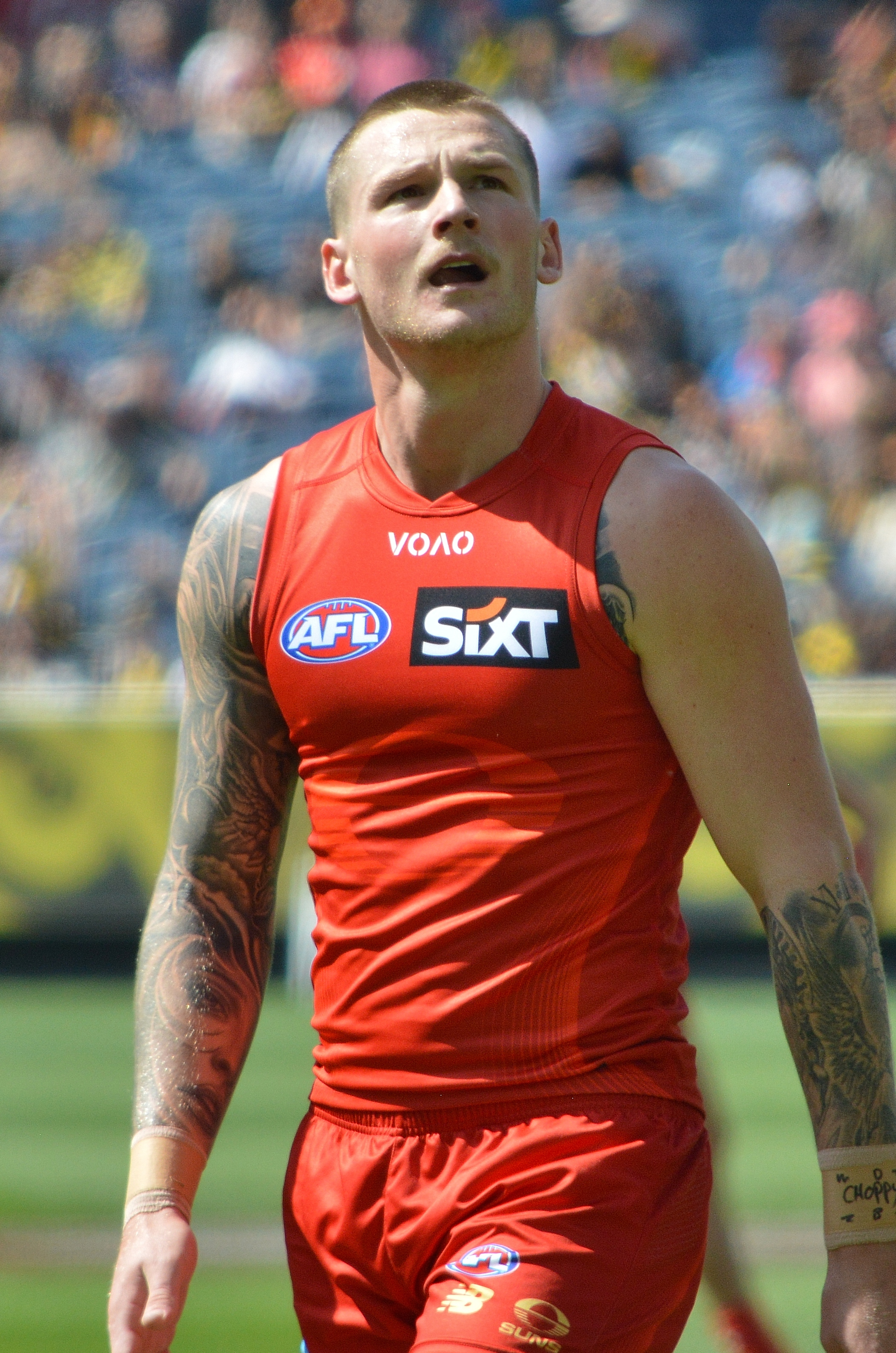
- Humphrey in March 2026

Personal information
- Full name: Bailey Humphrey
- Nicknames: Humper, The Bear
- Born: 11 September 2004 (age 22)
- Original team: Gippsland Power
- Draft: No. 6, 2022 national draft
- Height: 185 cm (6 ft 1 in)
- Weight: 86 kg (190 lb)
- Positions: Midfielder, Forward

Club information
- Current club: Gold Coast Suns
- Number: 19

Playing career^{1}
Years	Club	Games (Goals)
2023–	Gold Coast	82 (72)
- ^{1} Playing statistics correct to the end of round 23, 2026.

Career highlights
- AFL Rising Star nominee: 2023

Bailey Humphrey (born 11 September 2004) is an Australian rules footballer who plays for the Gold Coast Suns in the Australian Football League (AFL).

== Early life ==
Humphrey was raised in Moe, Victoria where he played junior football for the Moe Lions in the Gippsland Football League. He attended secondary school at Lowanna College as part of their sporting academy. He competed for the Gippsland Power in the U18 Talent League in the latter stages of his junior football years. Humphrey was considered a leading draft prospect in the lead up to the 2022 AFL draft and was selected by the Gold Coast Suns with pick 6.

Humphrey has been an outspoken supporter for mental health, having suffered depression and anxiety for years after a close friend died by suicide.

== AFL career ==
Humphrey made his AFL debut for the Gold Coast Suns at 18 years of age in round 4 of the 2023 AFL season. He was nominated for the Rising Star award after a strong performance in round 9 of the 2023 season. Humphrey kicked the game-winning goal in Gold Coast's win over the highly rated Bulldogs in round 11. In June 2023, he signed a four-year contract extension with the Suns that will tie him to the club until at least the end of 2028.

== Statistics ==
Updated to the end of round 22, 2026.

Legend
G	Goals	K	Kicks	D	Disposals	T	Tackles
B	Behinds	H	Handballs	M	Marks

Season	Team	No.	Games	Totals							Averages (per game)							Votes
Season	Team	No.	Games	G	B	K	H	D	M	T	G	B	K	H	D	M	T	Votes
2023	Gold Coast	19	19	11	12	148	88	236	32	49	0.6	0.6	7.8	4.6	12.4	1.7	2.6	0
2024	Gold Coast	19	21	14	19	123	95	218	39	49	0.7	0.9	5.9	4.5	10.4	1.9	2.3	0
2025	Gold Coast	19	23	25	21	188	166	354	65	94	1.1	0.9	8.2	7.2	15.4	2.8	4.1	2
2026	Gold Coast	19	18	21	21	134	103	237	52	57	1.2	1.2	7.4	5.7	13.2	2.9	3.2	0
Career			81	71	73	593	452	1045	188	249	0.9	0.9	7.3	5.6	12.9	2.3	3.1	2
