= Nick Holman =

Australian rules footballer

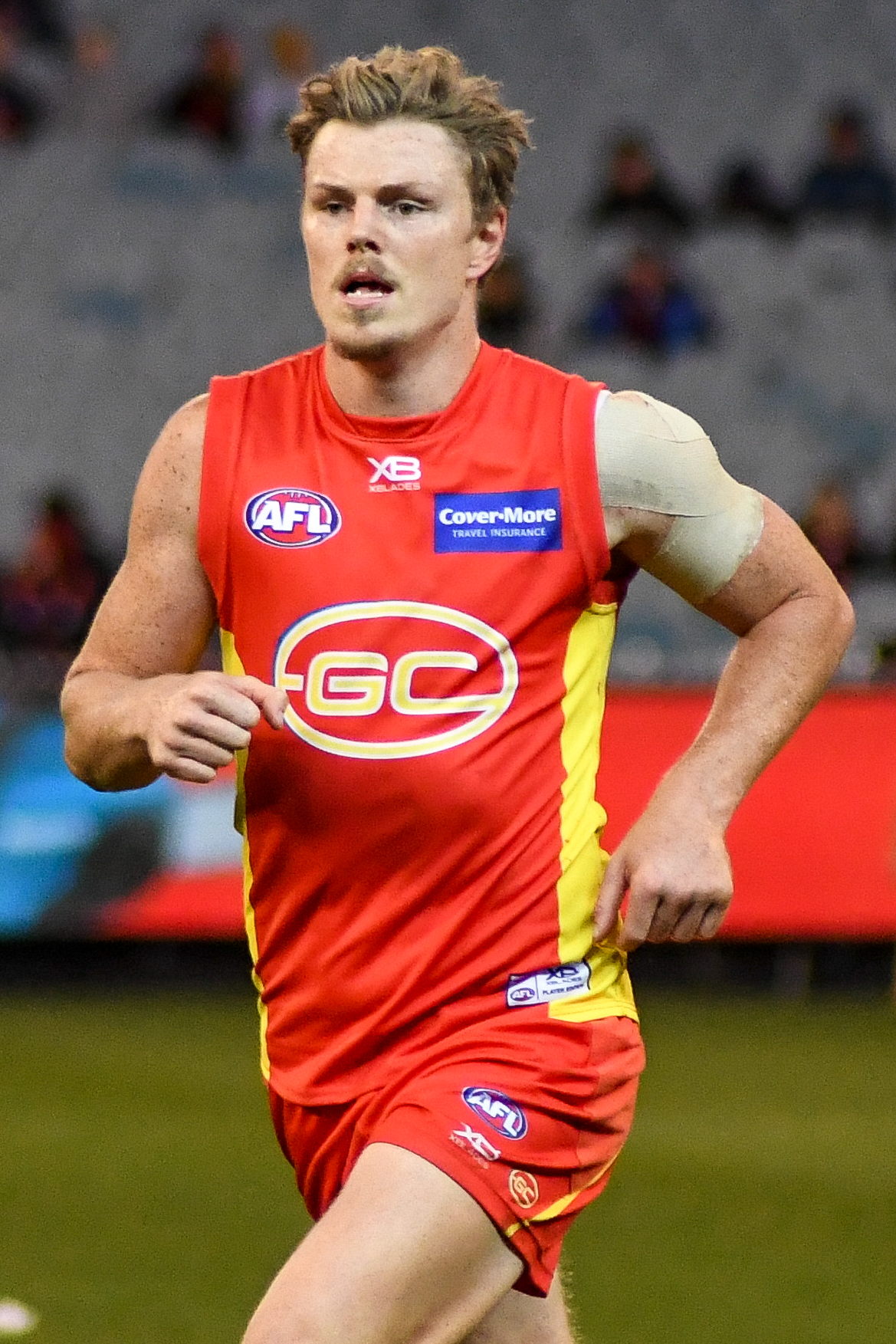
- Holman playing for Gold Coast in August 2018

Personal information
- Full name: Nicholas Holman
- Born: 29 May 1995 (age 31)
- Original team: Murray Bushrangers (TAC Cup)
- Draft: No. 51, 2013 national draft No. 19, 2018 rookie draft
- Height: 189 cm (6 ft 2 in)
- Weight: 78 kg (172 lb)
- Position: Utility

Playing career
Years	Club	Games (Goals)
2014–2015	Carlton	9 (0)
2018–2026	Gold Coast	145 (81)
Total		154 (81)

Nicholas Holman (born 29 May 1995) is a former professional Australian rules footballer who mostly played for the Gold Coast Football Club in the Australian Football League (AFL). He previously played for the Carlton Football Club from 2014 to 2015.

== Early life ==
Holman played his junior football with Kyabram Football Club in the Goulburn Valley Football League, where he won a senior premiership in 2013, and played TAC Cup football for the Murray Bushrangers, where he was the vice-captain. He represented and was named the joint-most valuable player (MVP) of the Vic Country team at the 2013 AFL Under 18 Championships, playing as a midfielder.

== AFL career ==
Holman was recruited by the Carlton Football Club with its third round selection, pick 51 overall, in the 2013 national draft. He spent most of the 2014 season playing with Carlton's VFL-affiliate, the Northern Blues, and he made his senior debut for Carlton against Port Adelaide in round 22, 2014.

After nine matches in two seasons, he was delisted at the conclusion of the 2015 season. He then made a move to the South Australian National Football League (SANFL) where he played for the Central District Football Club in 2016 and 2017.

After spending two seasons in the SANFL, Holman was recruited by the Gold Coast Suns in the 2018 rookie draft.

After 145 games for the Suns, Holman retired at the end of the 2026 season.

== Statistics ==
Updated to the end of round 22, 2026.

Legend
G	Goals	K	Kicks	D	Disposals	T	Tackles
B	Behinds	H	Handballs	M	Marks

Season	Team	No.	Games	Totals							Averages (per game)							Votes
Season	Team	No.	Games	G	B	K	H	D	M	T	G	B	K	H	D	M	T	Votes
2014	Carlton	20	1	0	0	5	3	8	2	4	0.0	0.0	5.0	3.0	8.0	2.0	4.0	0
2015	Carlton	20	8	0	0	31	44	75	15	21	0.0	0.0	3.9	5.5	9.4	1.9	2.6	0
2018	Gold Coast	39	22	14	10	133	149	282	58	121	0.6	0.5	6.0	6.8	12.8	2.6	5.5	0
2019	Gold Coast	39	12	7	5	75	98	173	25	62	0.6	0.4	6.3	8.2	14.4	2.1	5.2	0
2020 (Note: The 2020 season was played with 17 home-and-away matches per team (down from 22) and 16-minute quarters with time on (down from 20-minute quarters with time on) due to the impact of the COVID-19 pandemic.)	Gold Coast	39	12	2	0	48	73	121	27	43	0.2	0.0	4.0	6.1	10.1	2.3	3.6	0
2021	Gold Coast	39	16	10	5	111	94	205	67	72	0.6	0.3	6.9	5.9	12.8	4.2	4.5	0
2022	Gold Coast	7	20	16	10	113	120	233	42	94	0.8	0.5	5.7	6.0	11.7	2.1	4.7	0
2023	Gold Coast	7	19	13	8	101	132	233	48	84	0.7	0.4	5.3	6.9	12.3	2.5	4.4	0
2024	Gold Coast	7	21	10	11	108	126	234	42	79	0.5	0.5	5.1	6.0	11.1	2.0	3.8	0
2025	Gold Coast	7	16	6	2	52	83	135	16	54	0.4	0.1	3.3	5.2	8.4	1.0	3.4	0
2026	Gold Coast	7	6	1	1	26	40	66	14	14	0.2	0.2	4.3	6.7	11.0	2.3	2.3	0
Career			153	79	52	803	962	1765	356	648	0.5	0.3	5.2	6.3	11.5	2.3	4.2	0
