= Sam Flanders =

Australian rules footballer

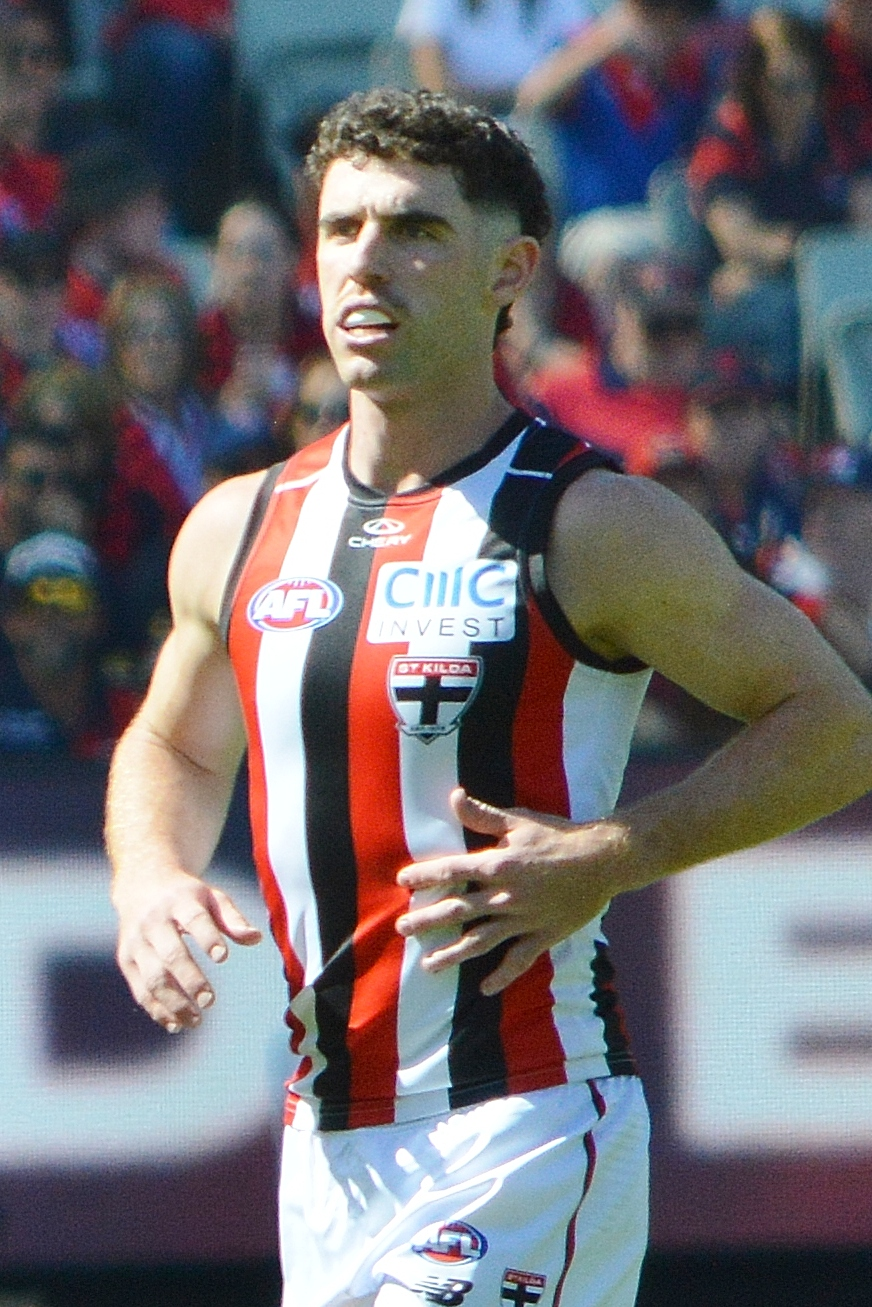
- Flanders with St Kilda in March 2026

Personal information
- Full name: Sam Flanders
- Nickname: Ned
- Born: 24 July 2001 (age 25); Fish Creek, Victoria
- Original team: Gippsland Power (NAB League)
- Draft: No. 11, 2019 AFL draft, Gold Coast
- Height: 183 cm (6 ft 0 in)
- Position: Midfielder

Club information
- Current club: St Kilda
- Number: 9

Playing career^{1}
Years	Club	Games (Goals)
2020–2025	Gold Coast	89 (37)
2026–	St Kilda	12 (1)
Total		101 (38)
- ^{1} Playing statistics correct to the end of round 22, 2026.

Sam Flanders (born 24 July 2001) is a professional Australian rules footballer who plays for the St Kilda Football Club in the Australian Football League (AFL). He previously played 89 matches with the Gold Coast Suns between 2020 and 2025.

== Early life ==
Flanders was born in Fish Creek, Victoria. He grew up playing basketball and Australian rules football at high junior levels. He attended Foster Secondary College, before moving to Lowanna College to be part of their selective football academy.

== AFL career ==
Flanders was drafted by the Gold Coast Suns with the eleventh pick in the 2019 AFL draft. He made his AFL debut in round 11 of the 2020 AFL season against Essendon at Metricon Stadium. In 2023, he signed a four-year contract extension that ties him to the Suns until at least the end of 2027. After the 2025 season finished Flanders told the Suns of his desire to be traded elsewhere for the upcoming 2026 season. This came after weeks of speculation with links to a trade back to Victoria. He ultimately requested a trade to St Kilda, and was traded on 8 October.

== Statistics ==
Updated to the end of round 22, 2026.

Legend
G	Goals	K	Kicks	D	Disposals	T	Tackles
B	Behinds	H	Handballs	M	Marks

Season	Team	No.	Games	Totals							Averages (per game)							Votes
Season	Team	No.	Games	G	B	K	H	D	M	T	G	B	K	H	D	M	T	Votes
2020 (Note: The 2020 season was played with 17 home-and-away matches per team (down from 22) and 16-minute quarters with time on (down from 20-minute quarters with time on) due to the impact of the COVID-19 pandemic.)	Gold Coast	26	5	2	1	17	14	31	4	14	0.4	0.2	3.4	2.8	6.2	0.8	2.8	0
2021	Gold Coast	26	16	4	5	96	93	189	46	62	0.3	0.3	6.0	5.8	11.8	2.9	3.9	0
2022	Gold Coast	26	9	3	1	51	46	97	22	19	0.3	0.1	5.7	5.1	10.8	2.4	2.1	0
2023	Gold Coast	3	14	5	3	179	160	339	75	35	0.4	0.2	12.8	11.4	24.2	5.4	2.5	1
2024	Gold Coast	3	22	11	5	380	300	680	122	50	0.5	0.2	17.3	13.6	30.9	5.5	2.3	12
2025	Gold Coast	3	23	12	6	192	238	430	79	48	0.5	0.3	8.3	10.3	18.7	3.4	2.1	3
2026	St Kilda	9	12	1	3	153	125	278	67	45	0.1	0.3	12.8	10.4	23.2	5.6	3.8	0
Career			101	38	24	1068	976	2044	415	273	0.4	0.2	10.6	9.7	20.2	4.1	2.7	16
