= Lloyd Johnston =

Personal information
- Full name: Lloyd Johnston
- Born: 21 September 2004 (age 22)
- Original teams: Wanderers Football Club (NTFL); NT Thunder (Talent League)
- Height: 184 cm (6 ft 0 in)
- Position: Forward

Club information
- Current club: Gold Coast
- Number: 38

Playing career
Years	Club	Games (Goals)
2023–2025	Gold Coast	9 (3)

Career highlights
- VFL premiership player: 2023

Lloyd Johnston (born 21 September 2004) is a former professional Australian rules footballer who played for the Gold Coast Football Club in the Australian Football League (AFL).

== Career ==
Lloyd, of Yanyuwa and Garrwa ancestry was raised in Borroloola. He moved to Darwin, Northern Territory and played with the Wanderers Football Club in the Northern Territory Football League where he won the league's Rising Star award and the NT Thunder before being contracted with the Gold Coast Suns through the Darwin Gold Coast Suns Academy. He was drafted as a Category B rookie in the 2022 AFL draft by the Gold Coast Suns. After impressing with the Gold Coast's Victorian Football League side. His exciting performances in the AFL saw him receive a contract extension until 2026.

== Statistics ==
Legend
G	Goals	K	Kicks	D	Disposals	T	Tackles
B	Behinds	H	Handballs	M	Marks

Season	Team	No.	Games	Totals							Averages (per game)							Votes
Season	Team	No.	Games	G	B	K	H	D	M	T	G	B	K	H	D	M	T	Votes
2023	Gold Coast	38	2	0	0	16	8	24	4	3	0.0	0.0	8.0	4.0	12.0	2.0	1.5	0
2024	Gold Coast	38	7	3	3	43	25	68	21	15	0.4	0.4	6.1	3.6	9.7	3.0	2.1	0
2025	Gold Coast	38	0	—	—	—	—	—	—	—	—	—	—	—	—	—	—	0
Career			9	3	3	59	33	92	25	18	0.3	0.3	6.6	3.7	10.2	2.8	2.0	0
