= Alex Davies (footballer) =

Australian rules footballer

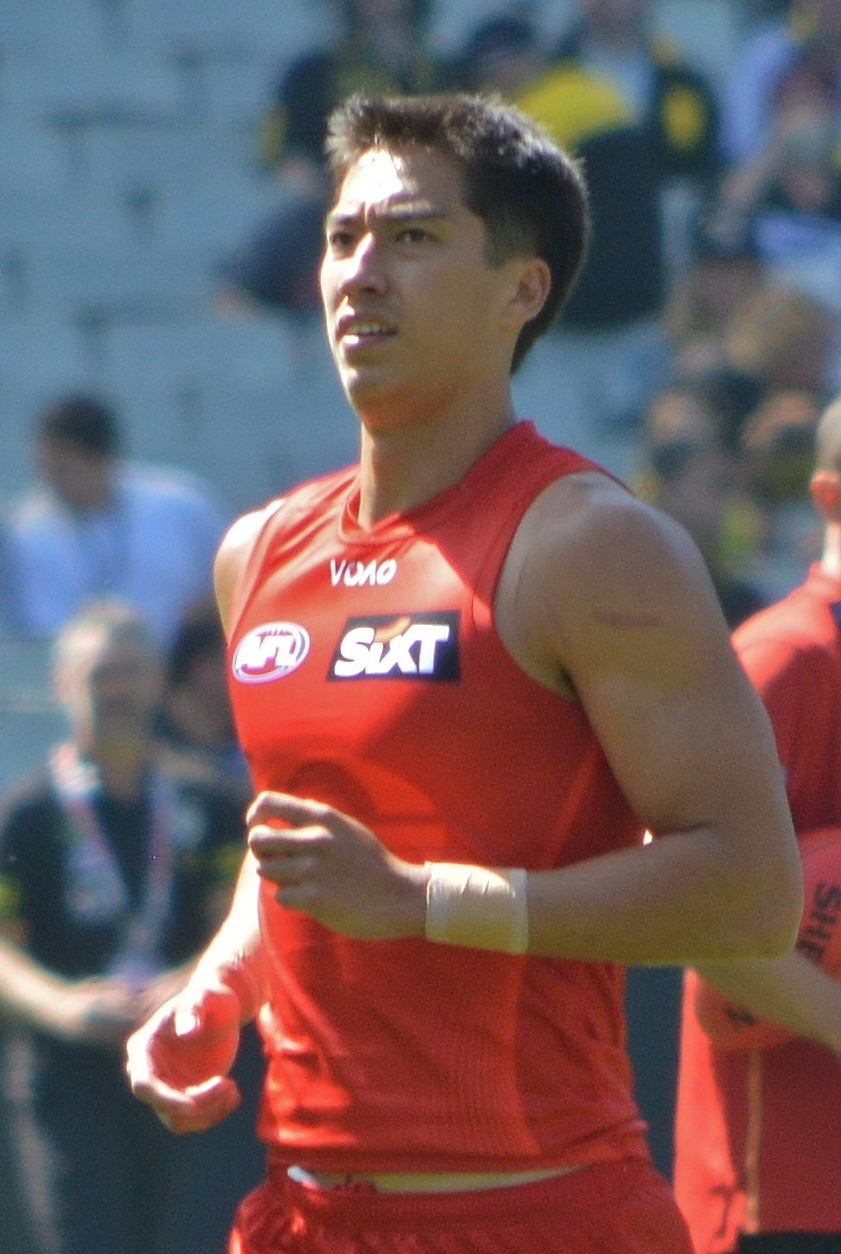
- Davies in March 2026

Personal information
- Full name: Alex Davies
- Born: 18 March 2002 (age 24); Wollongong, New South Wales
- Original teams: Broadbeach Cats (QAFL); Manunda Hawks (AFL Cairns)
- Draft: Pre-Draft Academy Selection, 2020 national draft
- Height: 191 cm (6 ft 3 in)
- Weight: 86 kg (190 lb)
- Position: Midfielder

Club information
- Current club: Gold Coast
- Number: 5

Playing career^{1}
Years	Club	Games (Goals)
2021–	Gold Coast	46 (15)
- ^{1} Playing statistics correct to the end of 2026.

Career highlights
- VFL premiership player: 2023

Alex Davies (アレックスデイビーズ; born 18 March 2002) is a professional Australian rules footballer playing for the Gold Coast Football Club in the Australian Football League (AFL).

== Early life ==
Davies was born in Wollongong, New South Wales to a Japanese mother and Tasmanian-born father. He was raised in Cairns, Queensland. He grew up playing Australian rules football for the Manunda Hawks and basketball for the Cairns Marlins, where he was considered an outstanding junior prospect in both sports. At the age of 12, he was placed in the Gold Coast Suns Academy as well as being placed in the Cairns Taipans' academy program as a teenager. In 2017, Davies captained Queensland to an Under-16 Junior National Basketball Championship victory which led to selection for his home state at the 2018 Basketball Australia Under-18 National Championships. He also represented Queensland at the 2018 AFL Under-16 National Championships and was named in the All-Australian team for his impressive performances.

Davies attended Cairns State High School with fellow football and basketball prodigy Tamuri Wigness throughout most of their teenage years and both juniors were given the opportunity to pursue professional careers in either sport. Wigness elected to continue with basketball in Cairns while Davies relocated to the Gold Coast towards the end of 2018 to join the Gold Coast Suns' academy program on a full-time basis as well as complete his schooling at All Saints Anglican School. The pair remain close friends and often train together in both sports when based in the same area.

In his first year based on the Gold Coast, Davies was influential for the Suns in their 2019 Northern Academy Series win and was rewarded with selection for the Allies at the 2019 AFL Under 18 Championships as a bottom ager. He made his senior QAFL for Broadbeach in June 2019, where he received his senior jumper from his Japanese grandfather, and caught the eye of coach Beau Zorko in his sole appearance for the club that year. Davies finished the year by competing in the Under-17 AFL Future All Stars game where he impressed with 18 disposals and a goal. Leading into his draft year, he was considered a top 10 draft prospect and was compared to Scott Pendlebury with his basketball background and ability to play as a tall midfielder but 2020 proved to be an injury plagued year for him. Despite the interrupted season, Davies was pre-listed by the Gold Coast Suns on the eve of the 2020 AFL draft.

== AFL career ==
Davies joined Gold Coast for his first AFL preseason in December 2020. He made his AFL debut for the Suns at 19 years of age in round 23 of the 2021 AFL season.

== Statistics ==
Updated to the end of round 22, 2026.

Legend
G	Goals	K	Kicks	D	Disposals	T	Tackles
B	Behinds	H	Handballs	M	Marks

Season	Team	No.	Games	Totals							Averages (per game)							Votes
Season	Team	No.	Games	G	B	K	H	D	M	T	G	B	K	H	D	M	T	Votes
2021	Gold Coast	30	1	0	2	5	11	16	2	6	0.0	2.0	5.0	11.0	16.0	2.0	6.0	0
2022	Gold Coast	5	15	8	3	81	68	149	27	47	0.5	0.2	5.4	4.5	9.9	1.8	3.1	0
2023	Gold Coast	5	9	1	3	60	69	129	15	39	0.1	0.3	6.7	7.7	14.3	1.7	4.3	0
2024	Gold Coast	5	7	1	1	37	72	109	8	49	0.1	0.1	5.3	10.3	15.6	1.1	7.0	1
2025	Gold Coast	5	8	2	1	48	88	136	8	44	0.3	0.1	6.0	11.0	17.0	1.0	5.5	0
2026	Gold Coast	5	6	3	4	32	65	97	6	27	0.5	0.7	5.3	10.8	16.2	1.0	4.5	0
Career			46	15	14	263	373	636	66	212	0.3	0.3	5.7	8.1	13.8	1.4	4.6	1
