= Maddy Brancatisano =

Australian rules footballer

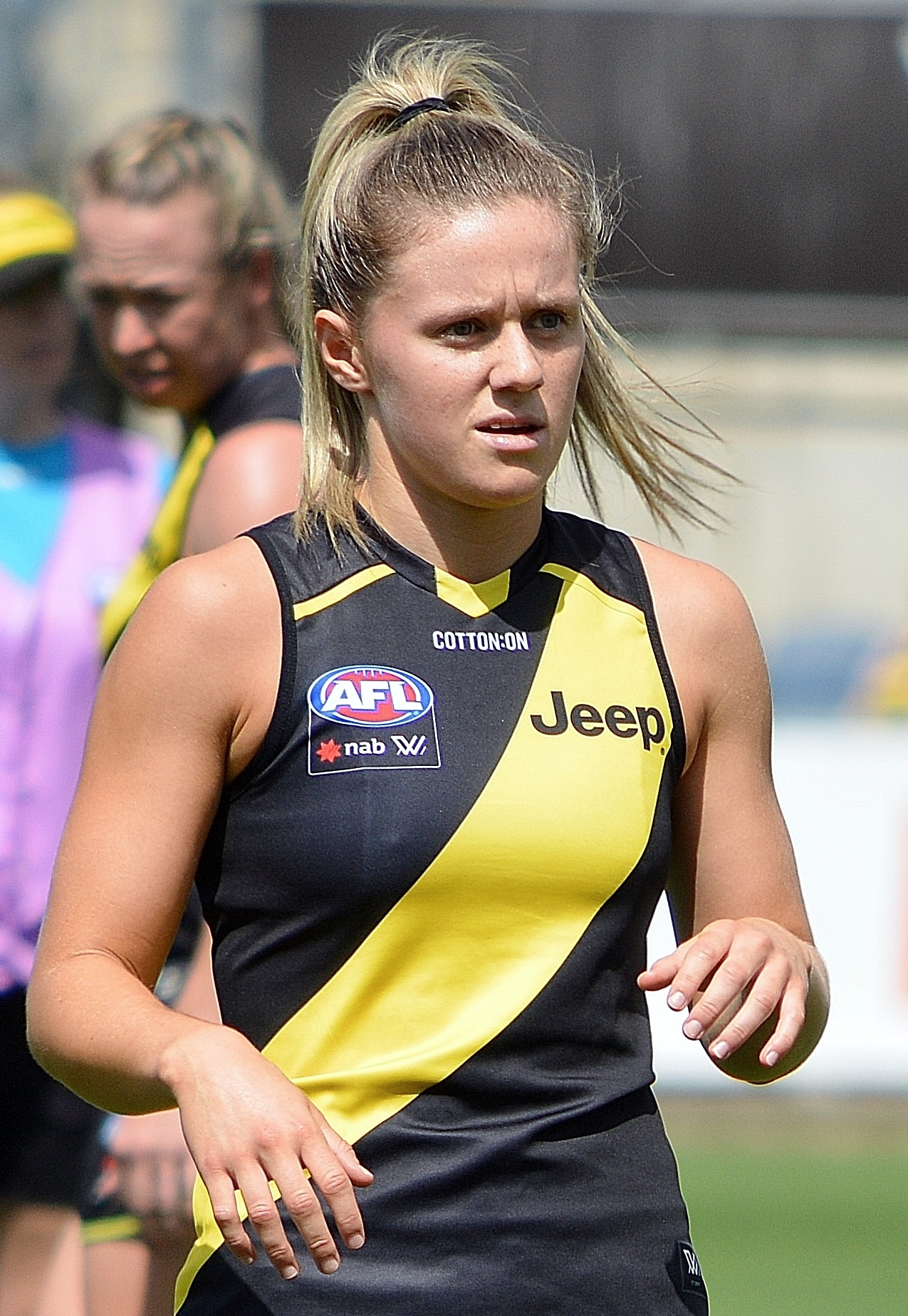
- Brancatisano with Richmond in February 2020

Personal information
- Full name: Madeline Brancatisano
- Born: 5 September 2000 (age 26)
- Original team: Northern Knights (TAC Cup)
- Draft: No. 15, 2018 national draft
- Debut: Round 1, 2020, Richmond vs. Carlton, at Ikon Park
- Height: 169 cm (5 ft 7 in)
- Position: Forward / midfielder

Club information
- Current club: Gold Coast

Playing career^{1}
Years	Club	Games (Goals)
2019	Melbourne	0 (0)
2020–2022 (S7)	Richmond	32 (0)
2023–	Gold Coast	11 (1)
Total		43 (1)
- ^{1} Playing statistics correct to the end of the 2023 season.

Career highlights
- Junior: TAC Cup Girls Team of the Year: 2018; Northern Knights captain: 2018

Madeline Brancatisano (born 5 September 2000) is an Australian rules footballer playing for the Gold Coast in the AFL Women's (AFLW). She has previously played for Melbourne and Richmond.

== Early life and junior football ==
Brancatisano hails from the north-east Melbourne suburb of Doreen and grew up playing basketball from the age of six. She attended high school at Catholic Ladies College, Eltham and later Box Hill Senior Secondary College.

Brancastisano first took up football at under 16s level, filling in for a Laurimar side in the junior ranks of the Northern Football Netball League. She first played representative football with the Northern Knights during their inaugural TAC Cup season in 2017, where she was captained in the side by her older sister Lily. The same year she played senior women's football with Montmorency in the Northern Football League and was selected to play for the Victorian Metro side at the 2017 AFL Women's Under 18 Championships.

In 2018, Brancatisano was elevated to captain the Knights and led her side to a losing TAC Cup Grand Final. She was named to the league's Team of the Year in 2018 and placed equal fourth in the league best and fairest count. Brancatisano also played matches with Montmorency's senior women's side in the Northern Football League that year, along with multiple games with Carlton at VFL Women's level. She against represented VIc Metro at the national championships in 2018 and also continued to play basketball, including training with the Geelong Supercats in the SEABL.

Brancatisano earned an invite to the 2018 AFL Women's draft combine where she set a fourth placed speed of 3.29 seconds in the 20-metre sprint test. In her junior career she was notable for her ability to win clearances while playing as a speedy inside midfielder.

== AFL Women's career ==
=== Melbourne (2019) ===
Brancatisano was drafted by Melbourne with the club's second pick and the 15th selection overall in the 2018 AFL Women's draft.

=== Richmond (2020–2022 (S7)) ===
Brancatisano signed with Richmond during the second period of the 2019 expansion club signing period in April. She made her debut against Carlton at Ikon Park in the opening round of the 2020 season.

=== Gold Coast (2023–) ===
In March 2023, Brancatisano was traded to Gold Coast in a straight swap for Courtney Jones.

== Statistics ==
Statistics are correct to the end of the 2021 season.

Legend
G	Goals	K	Kicks	D	Disposals	T	Tackles
B	Behinds	H	Handballs	M	Marks

Season	Team	No.	Games	Totals							Averages (per game)						
Season	Team	No.	Games	G	B	K	H	D	M	T	G	B	K	H	D	M	T
2019	Melbourne	23	0	—	—	—	—	—	—	—	—	—	—	—	—	—	—
2020	Richmond	5	6	0	1	12	20	32	7	7	0.0	0.2	2.0	3.3	5.3	1.2	1.2
2021	Richmond	5	8	0	0	38	56	94	14	22	0.0	0.0	4.8	7.0	11.8	1.8	2.8
Career			14	0	1	50	76	126	21	29	0.0	0.1	3.6	5.4	9.0	1.5	2.1
