= Brayden Fiorini =

Australian rules footballer (born 1997)

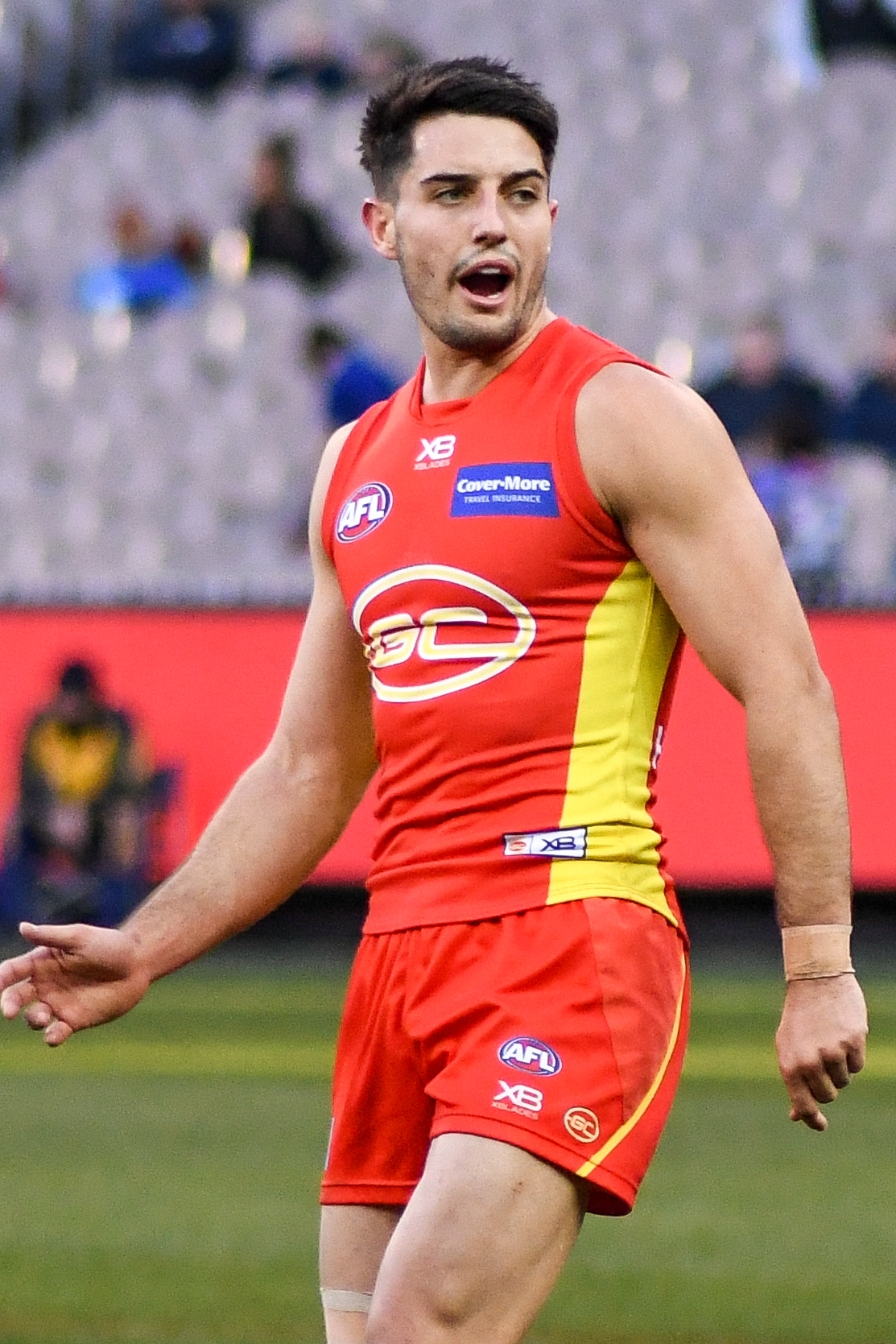
- Fiorini playing for Gold Coast in August 2018

Personal information
- Full name: Brayden Fiorini
- Born: 22 August 1997 (age 29)
- Original team: Northern Knights (TAC Cup)
- Draft: No. 20, 2015 national draft
- Debut: Round 22, 2016, Gold Coast vs. Collingwood, at Etihad Stadium
- Height: 187 cm (6 ft 2 in)
- Weight: 84 kg (185 lb)
- Position: Midfielder

Club information
- Current club: Essendon
- Number: 8

Playing career^{1}
Years	Club	Games (Goals)
2016–2025	Gold Coast	123 (41)
2026–	Essendon	2 (2)
Total		125 (43)
- ^{1} Playing statistics correct to the end of round 22, 2026.

Brayden Fiorini (born 22 August 1997) is an Australian rules footballer playing for the Essendon Football Club in the Australian Football League (AFL). He previously played for the Gold Coast Suns, having been drafted with pick 20 in the 2015 national draft. He made his debut in the 71-point loss against Collingwood in round 22, 2016 at Etihad Stadium.

At the end of the 2025 season, Fiorini was traded to Essendon, for a third round pick in the 2026 draft.

In his first season at the bombers in 2026, Fiorini was a late withdrawal prior to the round 3 clash with North Melbourne due to a back complaint. It was more serious than first thought, as he required surgery on his back to resolve the issue, which ruled him out for the remainder of the 2026 season.

== Statistics ==
Updated to the end of round 22, 2026.

Legend
G	Goals	K	Kicks	D	Disposals	T	Tackles
B	Behinds	H	Handballs	M	Marks

Season	Team	No.	Games	Totals							Averages (per game)							Votes
Season	Team	No.	Games	G	B	K	H	D	M	T	G	B	K	H	D	M	T	Votes
2016	Gold Coast	29	2	2	1	26	23	49	11	13	1.0	0.5	13.0	11.5	24.5	5.5	6.5	1
2017	Gold Coast	8	13	5	0	136	138	274	75	36	0.4	0.0	10.5	10.6	21.1	5.8	2.8	0
2018	Gold Coast	8	11	4	5	160	81	241	47	49	0.4	0.5	14.5	7.4	21.9	4.3	4.5	5
2019	Gold Coast	8	21	5	7	339	195	534	88	100	0.2	0.3	16.1	9.3	25.4	4.2	4.8	4
2020 (Note: The 2020 season was played with 17 home-and-away matches per team (down from 22) and 16-minute quarters with time on (down from 20-minute quarters with time on) due to the impact of the COVID-19 pandemic.)	Gold Coast	8	5	2	0	45	20	65	18	9	0.4	0.0	9.0	4.0	13.0	3.6	1.8	0
2021	Gold Coast	8	10	2	2	133	101	234	52	47	0.2	0.2	13.3	10.1	23.4	5.2	4.7	2
2022	Gold Coast	8	14	3	3	155	73	228	48	41	0.2	0.2	11.1	5.2	16.3	3.4	2.9	3
2023	Gold Coast	8	17	4	8	204	98	302	69	44	0.2	0.5	12.0	5.8	17.8	4.1	2.6	2
2024	Gold Coast	8	12	6	4	125	103	228	59	22	0.5	0.3	10.4	8.6	19.0	4.9	1.8	0
2025	Gold Coast	8	18	8	3	197	180	377	64	76	0.4	0.2	10.9	10.0	20.9	3.6	4.2	1
2026	Essendon	8	2	2	1	12	18	30	6	1	1.0	0.5	6.0	9.0	15.0	3.0	0.5	0
Career			125	43	34	1532	1030	2562	537	438	0.3	0.3	12.3	8.2	20.5	4.3	3.5	18
