= QClash =

Brisbane v Gold Coast in Australian rules football

- Brisbane Lions Gold Coast Suns
- Location: South-East Queensland
- First meeting: 7 May 2011 (Gold Coast 124–116 Brisbane)
- Latest meeting: 6 June 2026 (Gold Coast 75–106 Brisbane)
- Next meeting: 15 August 2026
- Trophy: QClash Trophy

Statistics
- Total meetings: 31
- All-time series (H&A season only): Brisbane Lions 23 wins Gold Coast 8 wins
- Largest victory: Brisbane Lions, 91 points 10 August 2019
- Longest win streak: Brisbane Lions, 9; 18 August 2018–29 July 2023
- Current win streak: Brisbane Lions, 2; 13 September 2025–present

The QClash is the Australian rules football derby between the two Queensland-based teams in the Australian Football League (AFL), the Brisbane Lions and Gold Coast Suns. The derby has been staged, usually twice annually, since 2011, when Gold Coast defeated Brisbane in the inaugural match, which attracted a then-record pay TV viewership for the sport. As of 2026, the Lions have been the dominant side in the rivalry, winning 23 matches to the Suns' 8.

Various nicknames for the QClash have entered mainstream usage, including the Pineapple Grapple, Banana Bash, and Sunshine Stoush.

== Background ==
The QClash was promoted by the league, the clubs and the football media as a name for the game, in similar terms to the other local derbies that exist in the AFL, such as the Western Derby and Showdown.

"We wanted a name that embodied Queensland, one that was unique and simple. We also wanted to reflect the big scale of the matches. Speaking to the coaches and players, there is no doubt that both teams want to win whenever we come together, and the QClash will be a real battle for state pride." — Former Brisbane Lions CEO Malcolm Holmes.

The medal for the player adjudged best on ground in the QClash is awarded the Marcus Ashcroft Medal. It is named after former footballer Marcus Ashcroft, who played junior football on the Gold Coast for Surfers Paradise/Southport and 318 VFL/AFL games for the Brisbane Bears/Lions between 1989 and 2003. He was the first Queenslander to play 300 VFL/AFL games and later served as a coach and administrator for the Gold Coast Suns. Current Gold Coast captain Touk Miller has won the medal a record four times.

AFLW QClash trophy

The trophy awarded to the winner of the game is currently known as the "QClash Trophy". The trophy is a traditional-looking silver cup with a wooden base and a plaque. The plaque's inscription reads from left to right, "Brisbane Lions AFC, QCLASH, Gold Coast Suns FC".

=== Venues ===
Brisbane	Gold Coast
The Gabba	Carrara Stadium
Capacity: 37,478	Capacity: 25,000

== Notable QClashes ==
=== QClash 1 — Inaugural Queensland Clash ===
The first edition of the QClash took place on 7 May 2011 at the Gabba. The Suns were required to host the inaugural meeting between the two teams at the Gabba as their home ground, Carrara Stadium, was unavailable until later that year. Despite the Lions not having won a game for the season leading into the game, they were considered strong favourites to defeat their Gold Coast neighbours. The Suns had recorded their first ever AFL win two weeks prior to the clash while Brisbane was winless leading into the first ever Queensland derby. In the lead up to the match, triple premiership Lion Simon Black expressed resentment towards the Suns by stating "the AFL have given them everything, and then some" as well as labelling former Brisbane players Jared Brennan and Michael Rischitelli "mercenaries" because they had joined the Suns in the off season. Gold Coast coach Guy McKenna returned serve by stating that the Suns were brought into the competition to clean up the mess left by the Brisbane Bears, which Lions coach and former Bears player Michael Voss said he took personally and stated that McKenna's comments were "out of line". Two days before the game it was revealed that 10 Queenslanders had been chosen to compete in the clash.

The Suns got off to a hot start in the first quarter and led the clash by 19 points at first exchange of ends. Gold Coast held that lead through the first three quarters and the tension rose early in the third term when Gold Coast's David Swallow unintentionally knocked Brisbane's Andrew Raines unconscious, who was taken off with concussion. Trailing by 19 points at the beginning of the fourth quarter, the Lions mounted a comeback off the back of six second half goals from Ashley McGrath, who was swung forward at half time. A Todd Banfield goal at the 15-minute mark in the fourth term equaled the scores late in the game but a spectacular pack mark taken by Gold Coast forward Nathan Krakouer a minute later stemmed the tide as he kicked truly for his fifth goal to give the Suns a one-goal lead. McGrath's sixth goal just seconds later again equaled the scores once again. Gold Coast were awarded a controversial free kick for a high tackle a minute later which allowed small forward Brandon Matera to play on and kick the Suns to a seven-point lead that they wouldn't relinquish. The Suns claimed the inaugural QClash 18.16 (124) to 17.14 (116). Former Lion and new Sun Jared Brennan was awarded the inaugural Marcus Ashcroft Medal for his best on ground performance that included 30 disposals and 14 clearances.

QClash 1
Saturday, 7 May 2011 (7:10 pm)	Gold Coast	def.	Brisbane Lions	The Gabba (crowd: 25,504)
6.3 (39); 10.8 (68); 13.13 (91); 18.16 (124)	Q1; Q2; Q3; Final	3.2 (20); 6.5 (35); 11.7 (73); 17.14 (116)	Umpires: Jennings, Ryan, McInerney; Marcus Ashcroft Medal: Jared Brennan; Brownlow Votes: 3 J. Brennan, 2 Z. Smith, 1 A. McGrath; Television broadcast: Fox Footy (national), Seven Network (simulcast in QLD)
5: Krakouer; 2: Matera, Patrick, Lynch; 1: Stanley, Shaw, McKenzie, Iles, Harris, Daye, Brennan	Goals	6: McGrath; 3: Rich; 2: Banfield, Clark; 1: Polkinghorne, Black, Beams, Adcock
Brennan, Krakouer, Smith, Rischitelli, Ablett Jr, Harris	Best	Rich, Black, McGrath, Leuenberger, Hanley
Gorringe (hamstring)	Injuries	Raines (concussion)
Nil	Reports	Nil

=== QClash 11 — The bump ===
QClash 11 took place on 16 April 2016 at the Gabba. The Suns had compiled an undefeated 3–0 record leading into the game and were sitting equal top of the ladder while the Lions were winless sitting on the bottom of the ladder. The two teams traded goals for much of the first half as the Suns led by 2 points at the end of the first term and 8 points at half time. The biggest talking point of the night took place a minute before half time when Gold Coast defender Steven May elected to bump Brisbane ruckman Stefan Martin under his chin. Martin was knocked unconscious and was motionless for several minutes after the incident. May was a repeat offender as he had bumped Lion Tom Rockliff unconscious in QClash 9. Seemingly spurred on by what had occurred just prior to half time, the Lions gained the lead in the third quarter and eventually ran out 13-point winners at full time. The Marcus Ashcroft Medal was awarded to Irishman Pearce Hanley for his sublime 28-disposal, 2-goal performance. In the week following the match, May was referred straight to the tribunal where he later received a five-match suspension.

QClash 11
Saturday, 16 April 2016 (4:35 pm)	Brisbane Lions	def.	Gold Coast	The Gabba (crowd: 20,041)
3.6 (24); 4.15 (39); 10.20 (80); 14.23 (107)	Q1; Q2; Q3; Final	4.2 (26); 7.5 (47); 12.7 (79); 14.10 (94)	Umpires: Donlon, Chamberlain, Wallace; Marcus Ashcroft Medal: Pearce Hanley; Brownlow Votes: 3 P. Hanley, 2 T. Lynch, 1 D. Zorko; Television broadcast: Fox Footy (national), Seven Network (simulcast in QLD)
2: Hanley, Bell, Cutler; 1: Christensen, Zorko, Green, Schache, Taylor, Bastinac, Bewick, Martin	Goals	5: Lynch; 2: Sexton; 1: Hall, Cameron, Martin, Rischitelli, Rosa, Malceski, Day
Hanley, Rich, Bell, Bewick, Robinson	Best	Lynch, Malceski, Hall, Ablett Jr, Day, Prestia
Martin (concussion)	Injuries
Nil	Reports	May (head bump)

=== QClash 15 — Zorko refuses to shake hands ===
QClash 15 took place on 22 April 2018 at the Gabba. Both Queensland clubs had suffered embarrassing losses the week prior to the 15th local derby and were keen to prove a point in the round 5 clash. The Suns went about building a healthy lead in the first half and led the contest by 14 points at the major break. Gold Coast then led the clash by as many as 27 points in the third quarter before Brisbane began fighting back. In the midst of a goalscoring frenzy from Brisbane, North Queenslander Charlie Cameron produced one of the goals of the year with a three effort run of play that involved a gather, a handball, a recovery, a tackle break, a fend off and ultimately a spinning snap goal. By the halfway point of the fourth quarter, Gold Coast's lead had been reduced to just four points. Despite Brisbane's relentless pressure in the last eight minutes of the game, the Suns were able to hold on for a five-point victory. Touk Miller was awarded the Marcus Ashcroft Medal for his shutdown role on Brisbane vice captain Dayne Zorko. However, post-game footage captured Zorko telling his opponent to "fuck off" when approached for a handshake. Zorko was subsequently criticised by the media for the incident in the days that followed.

=== QClash 16 — 'Soft' comments and Zorko vs Miller ===
QClash 16 was held at Carrara Stadium on 18 August 2018. In the week leading up to the game, Brisbane defender Nick Robertson spoke on Macquarie Sports Radio where he labelled Gold Coast players "soft" and that he thought they "take a bit of a backwards step when blokes go hard in at the footy." Robertson added "I hope they hear that too" as the radio interview concluded. Hours later Brisbane coach Chris Fagan publicly expressed disappointment over Robertson's comments. When asked about his thoughts on Robertson's comments the next day, Gold Coast midfielder Jack Bowes was diplomatic and said "we respect all opposition." The fiery clash began with Brisbane kicking three unanswered goals before Gold Coast managed to score a goal just before quarter time. Following the quarter time siren, tempers flared as a mini-melee broke out between the two teams. The tension rose to another level midway through the second quarter when Sean Lemmens collected Brandon Starcevich with a high shot. Mitch Robinson and Lemmens collided in the immediate aftermath, while Dayne Zorko was floored metres away after being pushed into by Alex Sexton. The Lions took a slender one-goal lead into halftime as Gold Coast had fought back with five goals in the second quarter.

The Suns quickly captured ascendency early in the third quarter and held the lead until a contentious free kick was awarded to Harris Andrews, which resulted in a goal after the three-quarter time siren and subsequently handed the lead back to Brisbane. Upon viewing the replay, commentator Alastair Lynch stated "I actually don't think that is a holding free kick." Two quick goals allowed the Suns to build a nine-point lead early in the fourth quarter but a controversial 50 metre penalty for impeding the protected zone in the middle of the ground appeared to diminish Gold Coast's momentum and resulted in a Brisbane goal from Allen Christensen. Four minutes later Dayne Beams kicked a crucial goal midway through the fourth quarter to give Brisbane a four-point lead. Despite the margin remaining at four points for the last two and a half minutes, the Lions would hold the lead and walk away victorious 10.18 (78) to 11.8 (74) in QClash 16. Dayne Beams was awarded the Marcus Ashcroft Medal for his magnificent 38-disposal performance. Gold Coast midfielder Touk Miller was given the task of tagging Brisbane captain Dayne Zorko for the entire game and camera footage consistently showed the two engaging in scuffles with one another throughout the match. In the moments following the final siren, Zorko went directly to Miller and yelled expletives to his face before smiling and extending his hand to shake Miller's. The pair shook hands before Zorko continued to follow Miller around the field with his hand extended. As was the case after QClash 15, the media criticised Zorko for demonstrating a lack of sportsmanship in the days that followed. Four fines were handed to players from either side after the match; Brisbane's Luke Hodge and Mitch Robinson as well as Gold Coast's Brayden Fiorini and Sean Lemmens received fines. A month after the clash, Touk Miller stated "we don't like each other" when asked about Zorko and the rivalry between the two clubs.

=== QClash 23 — Struggling Suns make a stand and ongoing dislike between the clubs ===
Leading into the 23rd edition of the QClash, Gold Coast had lost seven consecutive matches to Brisbane by an average margin of 52 points and were publicly implored by media onlookers to make a stand in this particular clash. Intrigue began to grow in the days leading up to the match, as it was confirmed that Brisbane captain Dayne Zorko would return from injury for the match and an in-form Gold Coast skipper Touk Miller was also a confirmed starter. It was also revealed that Gold Coast stalwart David Swallow would break the all-time games record for the Suns by competing in QClash 23. Both teams entered the clash in precarious ladder positions, with Brisbane clinging on to a top-four position on the ladder and Gold Coast within striking distance of entering the top eight. QClash 23 took place at the Gabba on 23 July 2022, and the game was hotly contested from the beginning; Brisbane led by just eight points at quarter time. The Suns stunned the vocal Brisbane home crowd in the second quarter by kicking five goals to the Lions' two majors, and Gold Coast would enter the half-time break with a six-point lead. The match would turn into a seesawing affair in the third quarter with six lead changes, but the Suns would lead the clash by seven points at the last break with their performance being highlighted by key forwards Levi Casboult and Queenslander Mabior Chol, who had combined for six goals at three-quarter time. A noticeably tired Gold Coast outfit began to wilt at the midway point of the fourth quarter and conceded five consecutive goals to lose the clash by 17 points. Despite the loss, Gold Coast were highly commended for their performance against a top-four side, and Touk Miller was awarded a record-equalling third Marcus Ashcroft Medal as best afield. A month later, Touk Miller revealed in an interview that he had a "genuine dislike" for the Lions as well as Dayne Zorko and that it hurt him deeply to lose eight consecutive games to Brisbane.

=== QClash 25 — Suns snap losing streak, while Zorko accuses Miller of groin tackle ===
QClash 25 took place on 29 July 2023 at Carrara Stadium. The high-flying third-placed Lions entered the match as the favourites to continue their nine-game winning streak against Suns outfit, who were sitting 14th on the ladder and fighting to keep their season alive. The clash also served as the scene for Gold Coast vice captain Sam Collins' milestone 100th AFL game. A contested first quarter played out with both teams kicking many goals before Dayne Zorko drew a free kick for contact inside his forward 50 just seconds before quarter time and kicked after the siren to give the Lions a seven-point lead at the end of the first term. The second quarter was also a contested term, with the Suns able to gain a three-point ascendency at halftime. Gold Coast's players unexpectedly formed a huddle on field just before the beginning of the third quarter and began the third term well by playing inspired football which included kicking five of the first six goals to give themselves a 17-point lead at three-quarter time. The Suns were able to continue their fantastic form in the fourth quarter by kicking five goals to Brisbane's one, and this allowed Gold Coast to secure a 41-point victory over the Lions. Suns key forward Ben King was one of Gold Coast's best players, including a five-goal haul, while Touk Miller was awarded a record-breaking fourth Marcus Ashcroft Medal for his role on one of the league's Brownlow Medal favourites, Lachie Neale, while Gold Coast defender Mac Andrew was awarded the round 19 Rising Star nomination for his performance.

The biggest talking point from the game was a tackle performed by Touk Miller on Dayne Zorko in the third quarter that Zorko alleged was illegal. At the completion of the tackle, Zorko immediately remonstrated and was heard telling the umpire that Miller "just fucking grabbed my nuts!" (aka a "squirrel grip"). The incident was reviewed and not cited as illegal by Match Review Officer Michael Christian following the game, and the accusation of an illegal action involving Zorko's groin was generally viewed by the media as a difficult one to prove. Two days later in a radio interview, Zorko claimed he was suffering from significant bruising in the groin region and expressed his disappointment in the AFL's decision to not charge Miller for the incident. Despite Zorko's claims that they "had really good evidence to support the case," no report of a sustained injury was communicated to the AFL for their official injury report, and the Lions ultimately decided not to pursue the case in the days that followed. Interim Gold Coast coach Steven King said he found Zorko's accusation towards Miller "disrespectful" before adamantly claiming he knows the integrity of Miller and that any contact was "completely accidental". However, in a surprising twist, the AFL backflipped on their decision by announcing on the Thursday night that followed the game that Miller had been handed a one-match suspension for "conduct unbecoming", and the Suns would publicly state that they were "extremely disappointed" by the decision, while also going on to lose a must-win clash without Miller in the next round that would effectively end their 2023 season.

QClash 25
Saturday, 29 July 2023 (4:35 pm)	Gold Coast	def.	Brisbane Lions	Carrara Stadium (crowd: 14,097)
2.2 (14); 5.3 (33); 10.3 (63); 15.6 (96)	Q1; Q2; Q3; Final	3.3 (21); 4.6 (30); 6.10 (46); 7.13 (55)	Umpires: Stephens, Whetton, Adair, Strybos; Marcus Ashcroft Medal: Touk Miller; Brownlow Votes: 3: T. Miller, 2: B. King, 1: M. Rowell; Television broadcast: Fox Footy (national), Seven Network (QLD)
5: King; 2: Casboult, Ainsworth; 1: Rowell, Rosas, Darcy Macpherson, Farrar, Ellis, Anderson	Goals	2: Cameron; 1: Zorko, McCluggage, McCarthy, Lohmann, Hipwood
Miller, Anderson, King, Powell, Rowell, Flanders	Best	Dunkley, Coleman, McCluggage, Ah Chee, Wilmot
Nil	Injuries	Coleman (head)
Nil	Reports	Nil

=== QClash 30 — First All-Queensland Final; Ashcroft slams Suns for sledging ===
QClash 30 took place on 13 September 2025 at the Gabba and marked the first time that the two Queensland clubs had faced off in an AFL finals match. Brisbane entered the finals series as the defending premiers, after claiming the 2024 AFL premiership the year before, and finished third on the ladder in 2025 before losing their qualifying final to Geelong at the MCG in the first week of the finals series. Conversely, Gold Coast finished seventh on the ladder and qualified for their inaugural finals series in 2025. The Suns would taste their first finals victory in an entertaining 1-point elimination final win against Fremantle at Optus Stadium in the first week of the finals series and consequently qualified for the semi-final against Brisbane the following week. Following a best-on-ground performance that included 28 disposals and two goals, Will Ashcroft was asked if he was determined to prove a point against the Suns after several sledges throughout the season were directed at him, and he responded: "Always. Probably this side more than others." Ashcroft also added that he took the sledges personally and that "If I'm being honest I don't appreciate that... I'm not going to cop that on the chin."

QClash 30
Saturday, 13 September (7:35 pm)	Brisbane Lions	def.	Gold Coast	The Gabba (crowd: 36,628)	Report
3.5 (23); 9.6 (60); 12.10 (82); 14.16 (100)	Q1; Q2; Q3; Q4; Final	3.4 (22); 5.5 (35); 5.9 (39); 6.11 (47)
Bailey 3, Lohmann 3, W. Ashcroft 2, Morris 2, Ah Chee, Berry, Gallop, Rayner	Goals	King 2, Ainsworth, Anderson, Flanders, Rowell
W. Ashcroft, Dunkley, McCluggage, Rayner, Andrews, Bailey, Berry, Wilmot	Best	Collins, Rowell, Witts, Miller, Anderson
Nil	Injuries	Nil

== QClash Results (AFL) ==
	Season	Date	Rd	Home Team	Score	Away Team	Score	Ground	Crowd	Result/Winner	M	H2H	Report
1	2011	7 May	7	Gold Coast	18.16 (124)	Brisbane	17.14 (116)	The Gabba (Note: QClash 1 played at the Gabba due to Carrara Stadium not being completed (Saturday, 28 May 2011).)	25,501	Gold Coast	8	+1	
2	2011	13 August	21	Brisbane	18.15 (123)	Gold Coast	8.13 (61)	The Gabba	23,565	Brisbane	62	0	
3	2012	21 April	4	Brisbane	17.9 (111)	Gold Coast	6.10 (46)	The Gabba	21,980	Brisbane	65	+1	
4	2012	21 July	17	Gold Coast	5.18 (48)	Brisbane	8.11 (59)	Carrara Stadium	16,550	Brisbane	11	+2	
5	2013	13 April	3	Gold Coast	13.14 (92)	Brisbane	13.16 (94)	Carrara Stadium	12,961	Brisbane	2	+3	
6	2013	6 July	15	Brisbane	17.14 (116)	Gold Coast	12.11 (83)	The Gabba	27,170	Brisbane	33	+4	
7	2014	5 April	3	Gold Coast	17.12 (114)	Brisbane	9.7 (61)	Carrara Stadium	16,593	Gold Coast	53	+3	
8	2014	26 July	18	Brisbane	16.14 (110)	Gold Coast	8.8 (56)	The Gabba	27,167	Brisbane	54	+4	
9	2015	2 May	5	Gold Coast	18.10 (118)	Brisbane	7.12 (54)	Carrara Stadium	12,464	Gold Coast	64	+3	
10	2015	8 August	19	Brisbane	14.16 (100)	Gold Coast	17.12 (114)	The Gabba	20,025	Gold Coast	14	+2	
11	2016	16 April	4	Brisbane	14.23 (107)	Gold Coast	14.10 (94)	The Gabba	20,041	Brisbane	13	+3	
12	2016	9 July	16	Gold Coast	22.7 (139)	Brisbane	17.11 (113)	Carrara Stadium	13,528	Gold Coast	26	+2	
13	2017	25 March	1	Gold Coast	14.12 (96)	Brisbane	15.8 (98)	Carrara Stadium	12,710	Brisbane	2	+3	
14	2017	12 August1	21	Brisbane	22.10 (142)	Gold Coast	12.12 (84)	The Gabba	17,772	Brisbane	58	+4	
15	2018	22 April	5	Brisbane	10.11 (71)	Gold Coast	11.10 (76)	The Gabba	16,087	Gold Coast	5	+3	
16	2018	18 August	22	Gold Coast	11.8 (74)	Brisbane	10.18 (78)	Carrara Stadium	11,907	Brisbane	4	+4	
17	2019	27 April	6	Gold Coast	9.8 (62)	Brisbane	16.15 (111)	Carrara Stadium	13,694	Brisbane	49	+5	
18	2019	10 August	21	Brisbane	22.12 (144)	Gold Coast	8.5 (53)	The Gabba	22,530	Brisbane	91	+6	
19	2020	9 September	16	Brisbane	13.10 (88)	Gold Coast	6.7 (43)	The Gabba	11,292	Brisbane	45	+7	
20	2021	15 May	9	Gold Coast	7.9 (51)	Brisbane	19.10 (124)	Carrara Stadium	12,636	Brisbane	73	+8	
21	2021	24 July	20	Brisbane	17.18 (120)	Gold Coast	10.11 (71)	The Gabba	16,660	Brisbane	49	+9	
22	2022	24 April	6	Gold Coast	11.14 (80)	Brisbane	21.6 (132)	Carrara Stadium	14,897	Brisbane	52	+10	
23	2022	23 July	19	Brisbane	16.14 (110)	Gold Coast	14.9 (93)	The Gabba	21,467	Brisbane	17	+11	
24	2023	20 May	10	Brisbane	16.11 (107)	Gold Coast	9.10 (64)	The Gabba	23,286	Brisbane	43	+12	
25	2023	29 July	20	Gold Coast	15.6 (96)	Brisbane	7.13 (55)	Carrara Stadium	14,097	Gold Coast	41	+11	
26	2024	5 May	8	Brisbane	10.19 (79)	Gold Coast	6.9 (45)	The Gabba	30,285	Brisbane	34	+12	
27	2024	27 July	20	Gold Coast	9.11 (65)	Brisbane	13.15 (93)	Carrara Stadium	21,043	Brisbane	28	+13	
28	2025	4 May	8	Brisbane	9.12 (64)	Gold Coast	7.7 (49)	The Gabba	33,612	Brisbane	17	+14	
29	2025	26 July	20	Gold Coast	20.10 (130)	Brisbane	9.10 (64)	Carrara Stadium	20,833	Gold Coast	66	+13	
30	2025	13 September	SF	Brisbane	14.16 (100)	Gold Coast	6.11 (47)	The Gabba	36,628	Brisbane	53	+14	
31	2026	6 June	13	Gold Coast	11.9 (75)	Brisbane	15.16 (106)	Carrara Stadium	21,139	Brisbane	31	+15	
32	2026	15 August	23	Brisbane	14.11 (95)	Gold Coast	6.17 (53)	The Gabba	30,413	Brisbane	42	+16	

=== Timeline of results ===
GC
BL
GC
BL
GC
BL
GC
BL
GC
BL
GC
BL
GC
BL
│
2011
│
2012
│
2013
│
2014
│
2015
│
2016
│
2017
│
2018
│
2019
│
2020
│
2021
│
2022
│
2023
│
2024
│
2025
│
2026

== Marcus Ashcroft Medal ==
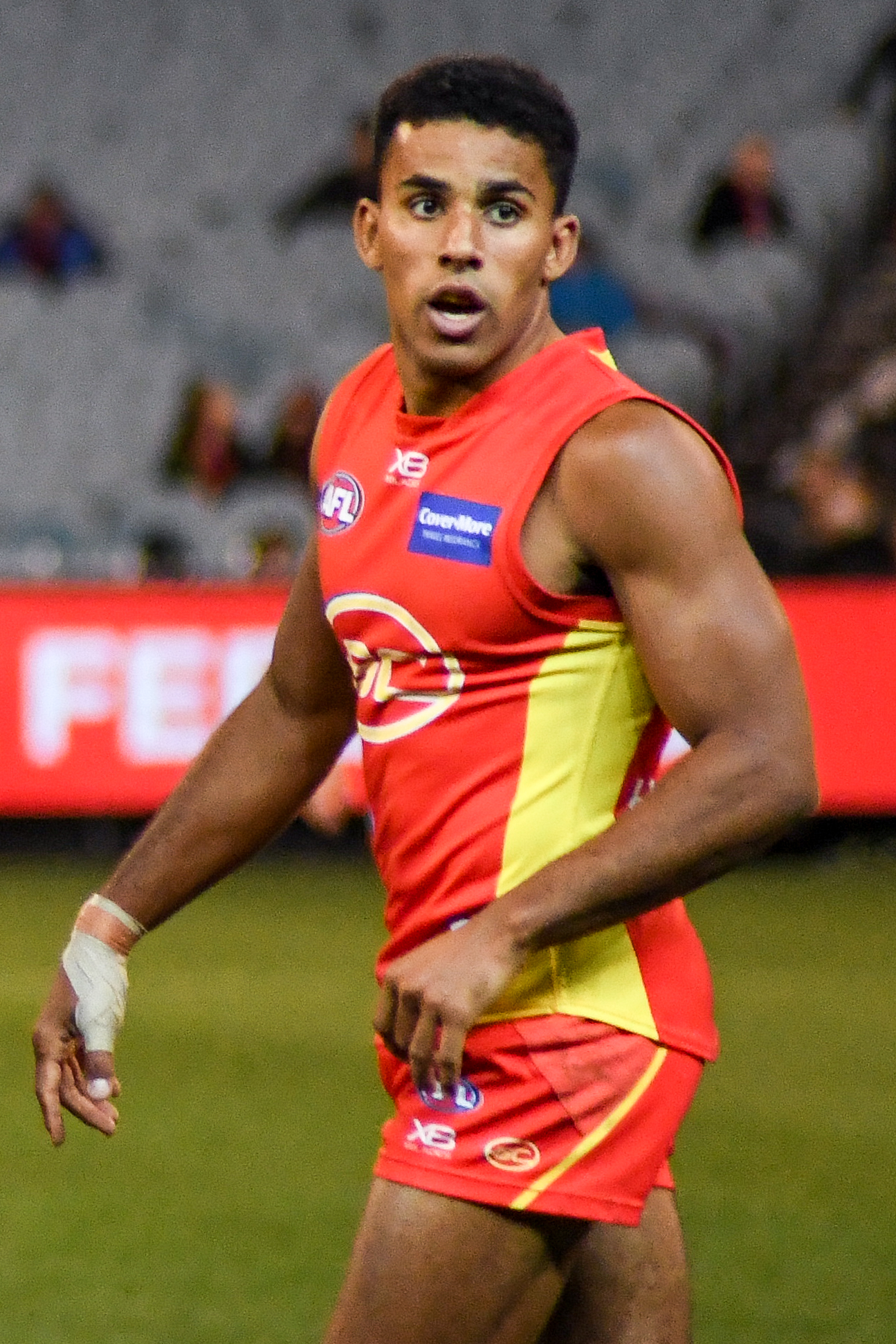
Current Gold Coast player Touk Miller holds the record for the most Marcus Ashcroft Medals (4).

The Marcus Ashcroft Medal is awarded to the player adjudged best on field during the QClash. It is named after triple Brisbane Lions AFL premiership player Marcus Ashcroft, who played junior football on the Gold Coast for Surfers Paradise and Southport. Ashcroft also held administrative roles at both the Lions and the Suns during his post-playing career.

=== Marcus Ashcroft Medal Winners ===
Year	Round	Winner	Total of Medal Wins	Football Club
2011	7	Jared Brennan	1	Gold Coast
2011	21	Simon Black	1	Brisbane
2012	4	Tom Rockliff	1	Brisbane
2012	17	Gary Ablett	1	Gold Coast*
2013	3	Jonathan Brown	1	Brisbane
2013	15	Matthew Leuenberger	1	Brisbane
2014	3	Gary Ablett	2	Gold Coast
2014	18	Pearce Hanley	1	Brisbane
2015	5	Charlie Dixon	1	Gold Coast
2015	19	Tom Lynch	1	Gold Coast
2016	4	Pearce Hanley	2	Brisbane
2016	16	Touk Miller	1	Gold Coast
2017	1	Dayne Beams	1	Brisbane
2017	21	Dayne Beams	2	Brisbane
2018	5	Touk Miller	2	Gold Coast
2018	22	Dayne Beams	3	Brisbane
2019	6	Mitch Robinson	1	Brisbane
2019	21	Charlie Cameron	1	Brisbane
2020	16	Lachie Neale	1	Brisbane
2021	9	Jarryd Lyons	1	Brisbane
2021	19	Jarryd Lyons	2	Brisbane
2022	6	Zac Bailey	1	Brisbane
2022	19	Touk Miller	3	Gold Coast*
2023	10	Lachie Neale	2	Brisbane
2023	20	Touk Miller	4	Gold Coast
2024	8	Dayne Zorko	1	Brisbane
2024	20	Dayne Zorko	2	Brisbane
2025	8	Will Ashcroft	1	Brisbane
2025	20	Matt Rowell	1	Gold Coast
2026	13	Logan Morris	1	Brisbane
2026	23	Will Ashcroft	2	Brisbane
*Indicates a player on the losing team who won the Marcus Ashcroft Medal. *No medal was awarded in QClash 30 due to it being a finals match.

== Shared history ==
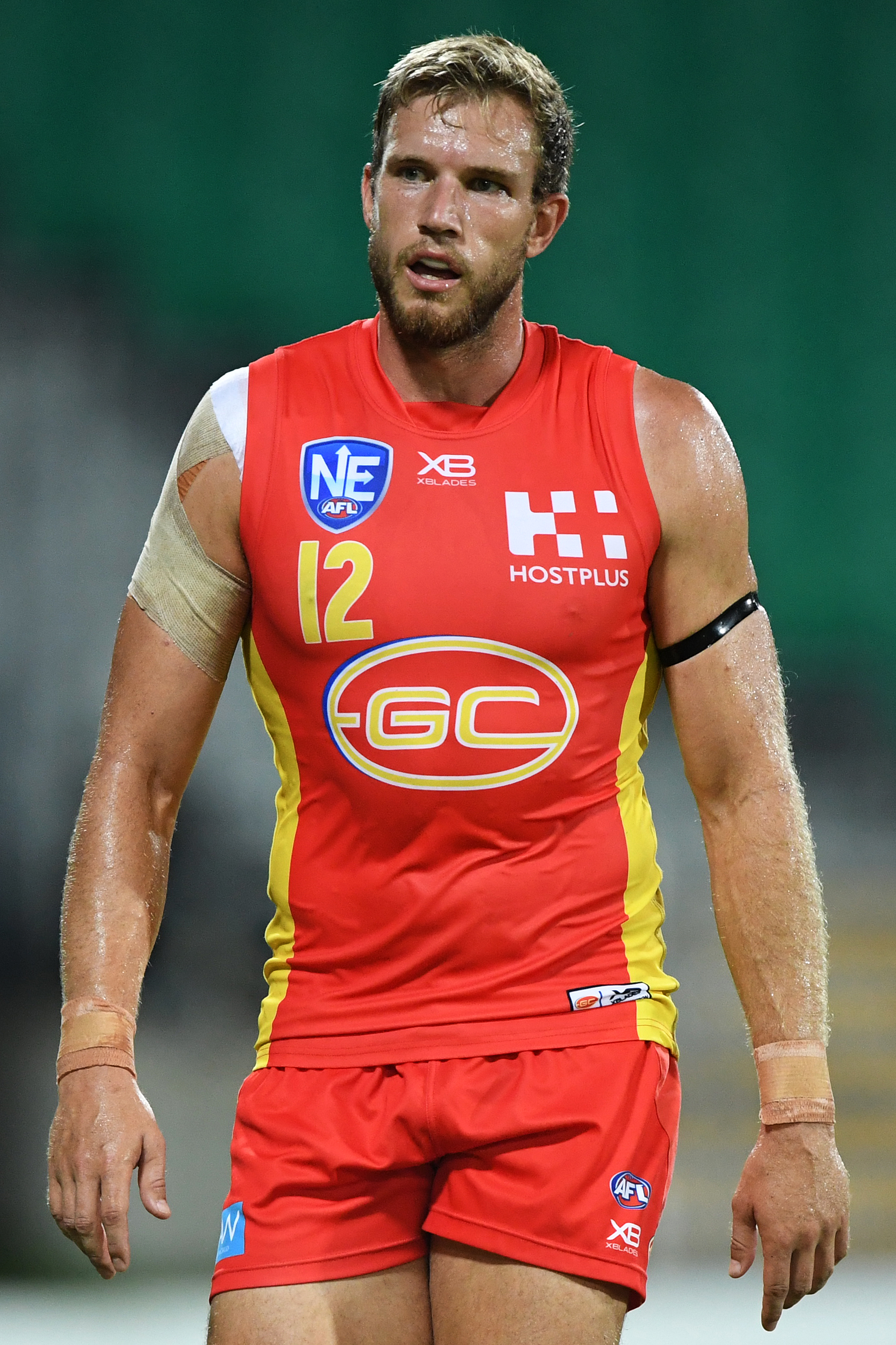
Sam Day played 14 QClashes for Gold Coast before moving to Brisbane, where he played in 2025's round 8 QClash.

=== Multi-club players ===
Below is a list of players who spent time at both the Brisbane Lions and Gold Coast Suns, and played in at least one QClash, in order of appearance for their second of the two clubs. It is updated through to the end of QClash 24.

Rohan Bewick (on Brisbane's list from 2011 to 2018 for 103 games) and Dayne Zorko (on Brisbane's list from 2012 to present for 304+ games) were also traded from Gold Coast to Brisbane, but they were only prelisted at the Suns and were never on their official list. When asked how he felt about the situation, Zorko admitted he was "extremely disappointed" and that the outcome "cut deeply" when his hometown club chose to trade him. Joel Tippett was on Brisbane's list from 2007 to 2009; however, he didn't play a game before playing two matches for Gold Coast in 2011. Tippett never featured in a QClash.

Current AFL-listed players

Order of playing for second club	Player	Games Played for Brisbane (Years Listed)	Games Played for Gold Coast (Years Listed)	Number of QClashes Played
1	(Northern Territory) Jared Brennan	119 (2003–10)	54 (2011–13)	6
1	(Victoria (state)) Michael Rischitelli	111 (2004–10)	130 (2011–19)	13
4	(Queensland) Andrew Raines	67 (2010–14)	6 (2015)	6
5	(Republic of Ireland) Pearce Hanley	129 (2008–16)	40 (2017–20)	14
6	(Victoria (state)) Jarryd Lyons	67 (2019–24)	37 (2017–18)	11
7	(Western Australia) Callum Ah Chee	106 (2020–25)	45 (2016–19)	13
8	(Victoria (state)) Tom Berry	20 (2019–22)	23 (2023–25)	3
8	(South Australia) Sam Day	13 (2025)	155 (2011–24)	15

== Statistics ==
Up to date at the completion of QClash 31

Current AFL-listed players

=== Games Played ===
#	Player	Club	QClashes
1	(Queensland) Dayne Zorko	Brisbane Lions	27
2	(Western Australia) David Swallow	Gold Coast	24
3	(Victoria (state)) Ryan Lester	Brisbane Lions	22
4	(Queensland) Harris Andrews	Brisbane Lions	20
5	(Victoria (state)) Touk Miller	Gold Coast	19

=== Goalkickers ===
==== Most goals in one game ====
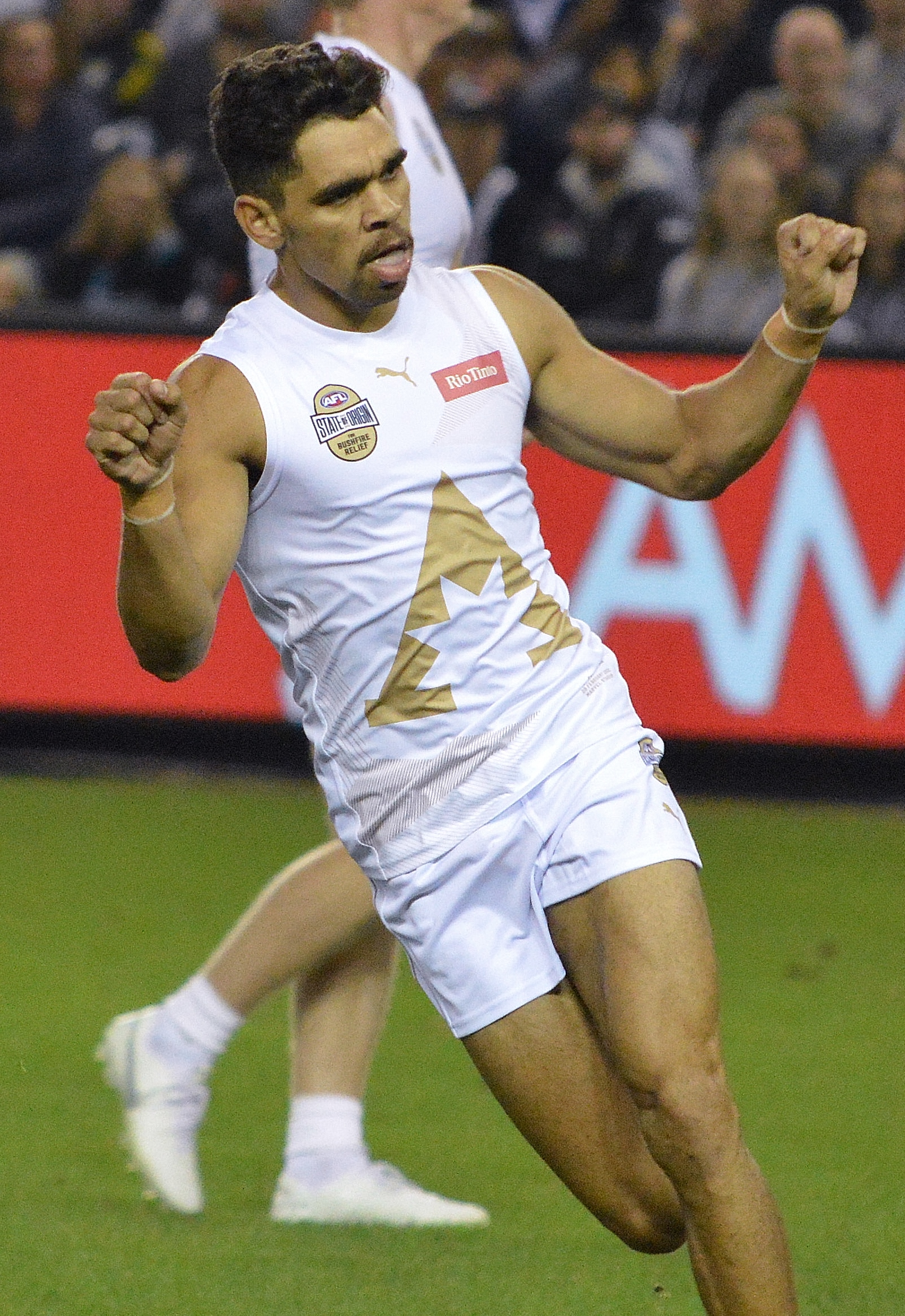
North Queenslander Charlie Cameron has kicked the most career QClash goals (37).

#	Player	Club	Venue	Year	Round	Goals	Behinds	Total Score
1	(Victoria (state)) Logan Morris	Brisbane Lions	Carrara Stadium	2026	Round 13	7	4	46
2	(Queensland) Charlie Dixon	Gold Coast	Carrara Stadium	2015	Round 5	6	2	38
2	(Queensland) Charlie Cameron	Brisbane Lions	The Gabba	2019	Round 21	6	1	37
2	(Northern Territory) Zac Bailey	Brisbane Lions	The Gabba	2022	Round 6	6	0	36
2	(Western Australia) Ashley McGrath	Brisbane Lions	The Gabba	2011	Round 7	6	0	36

==== Most career goals ====
#	Player	Club	Goals	Behinds	Games
1	(Queensland) Charlie Cameron	Brisbane Lions	37	21	16
2	(Victoria (state)) Ben King	Gold Coast	28	15	12
3	(Victoria (state)) Tom Lynch	Gold Coast	27	12	12
4	(Queensland) Eric Hipwood	Brisbane Lions	22	17	16
5	(Queensland) Dayne Zorko	Brisbane Lions	21	18	27

=== Hit-outs ===
==== Most hit-outs in a game ====
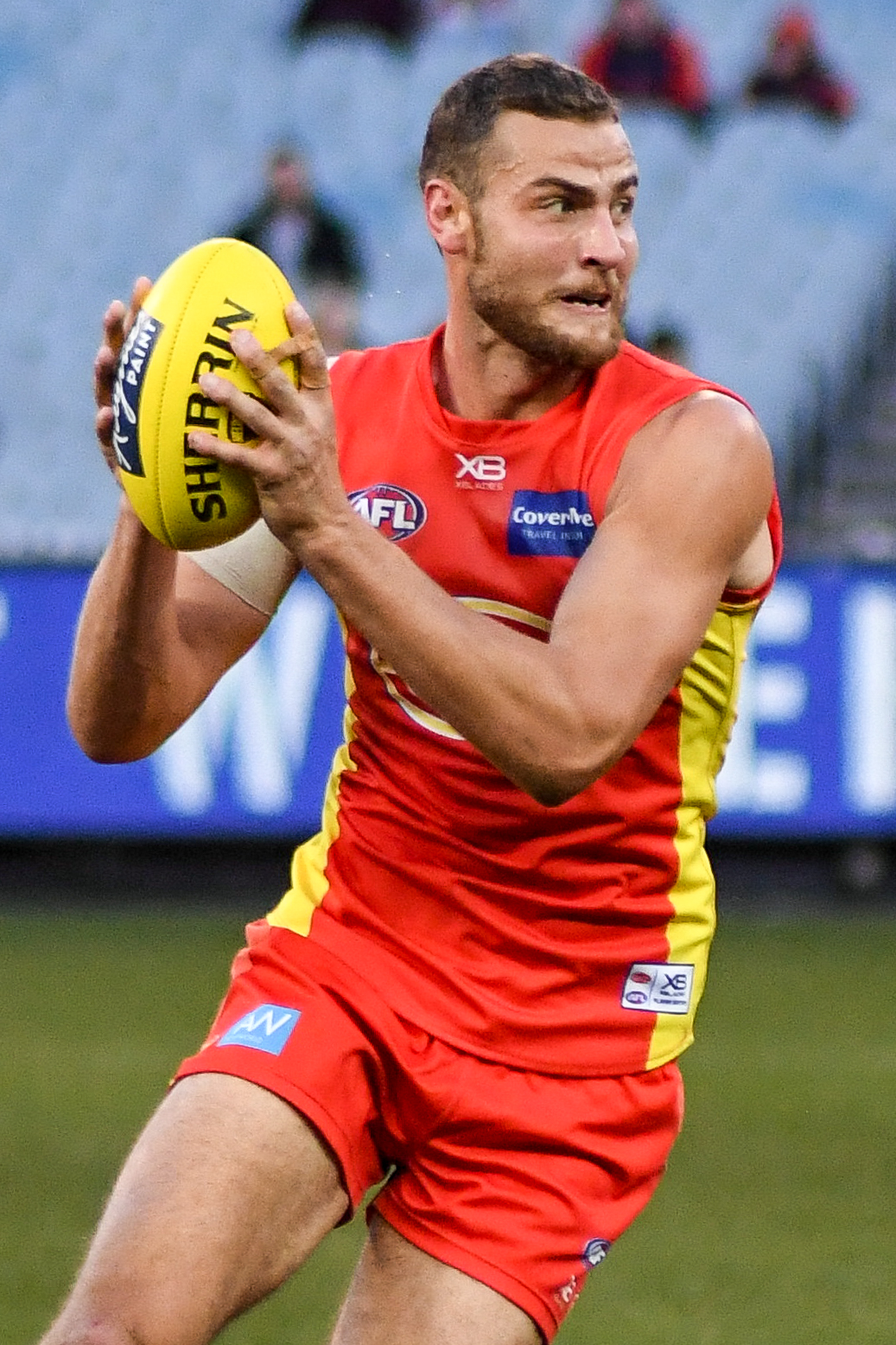
Jarrod Witts holds the record for the most hitouts in QClash history (647).

#	Player	Club	Year	Round	Hitouts
1	(New South Wales) Jarrod Witts	Gold Coast	2019	Round 21	53
2	(Western Australia) Matthew Leuenberger	Brisbane Lions	2011	Round 7	52
3	(New South Wales) Jarrod Witts	Gold Coast	2023	Round 10	51
4	(New South Wales) Jarrod Witts	Gold Coast	2022	Round 19	50
5	(New South Wales) Jarrod Witts	Gold Coast	2022	Round 6	48
5	(New South Wales) Jarrod Witts	Gold Coast	2025	Round 20	48

==== Most career hit-outs ====
#	Player	Club	Hitouts	Games
1	(New South Wales) Jarrod Witts	Gold Coast	647	16
2	(Victoria (state)) Oscar McInerney	Brisbane Lions	359	14
3	(Victoria (state)) Stefan Martin	Brisbane Lions	346	12
4	(Victoria (state)) Tom Nicholls	Gold Coast	186	6
5	(Western Australia) Matthew Leuenberger	Brisbane Lions	184	5

=== Disposals ===
==== Most disposals in a game ====
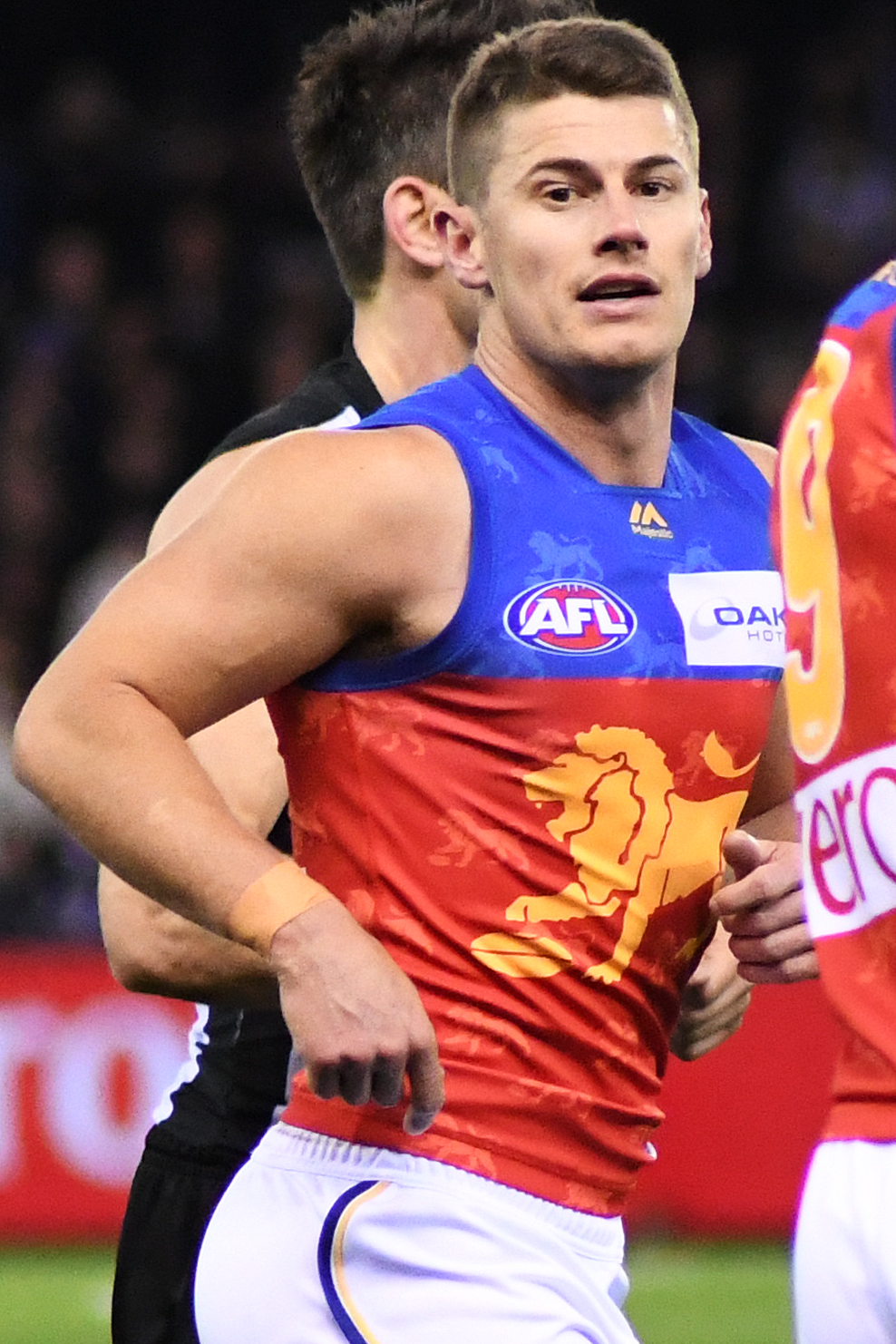
Queenslander Dayne Zorko holds recorded the most disposals in QClash history (585).

#	Player	Club	Venue	Year	Round	Disposals
1	(Victoria (state)) Tom Rockliff	Brisbane Lions	The Gabba	2014	Round 18	47
2	(Republic of Ireland) Pearce Hanley	Brisbane Lions	The Gabba	2014	Round 18	45
3	(Victoria (state)) Brayden Fiorini	Gold Coast	The Gabba	2021	Round 19	41
4	(Queensland) Dayne Zorko	Brisbane Lions	The Gabba	2024	Round 8	40
5	(Victoria (state)) Gary Ablett Jr	Gold Coast	Carrara Stadium	2014	Round 3	38
5	(Queensland) Dayne Beams	Brisbane Lions	Carrara Stadium	2018	Round 22	38

==== Most career disposals ====
#	Player	Club	Disposals	Games
1	(Queensland) Dayne Zorko	Brisbane Lions	585	27
2	(Western Australia) David Swallow	Gold Coast	478	24
3	(Victoria (state)) Touk Miller	Gold Coast	460	19
4	(Victoria (state)) Hugh McCluggage	Brisbane Lions	435	17
5	(Western Australia) Daniel Rich	Brisbane Lions	395	19

=== Clearances ===
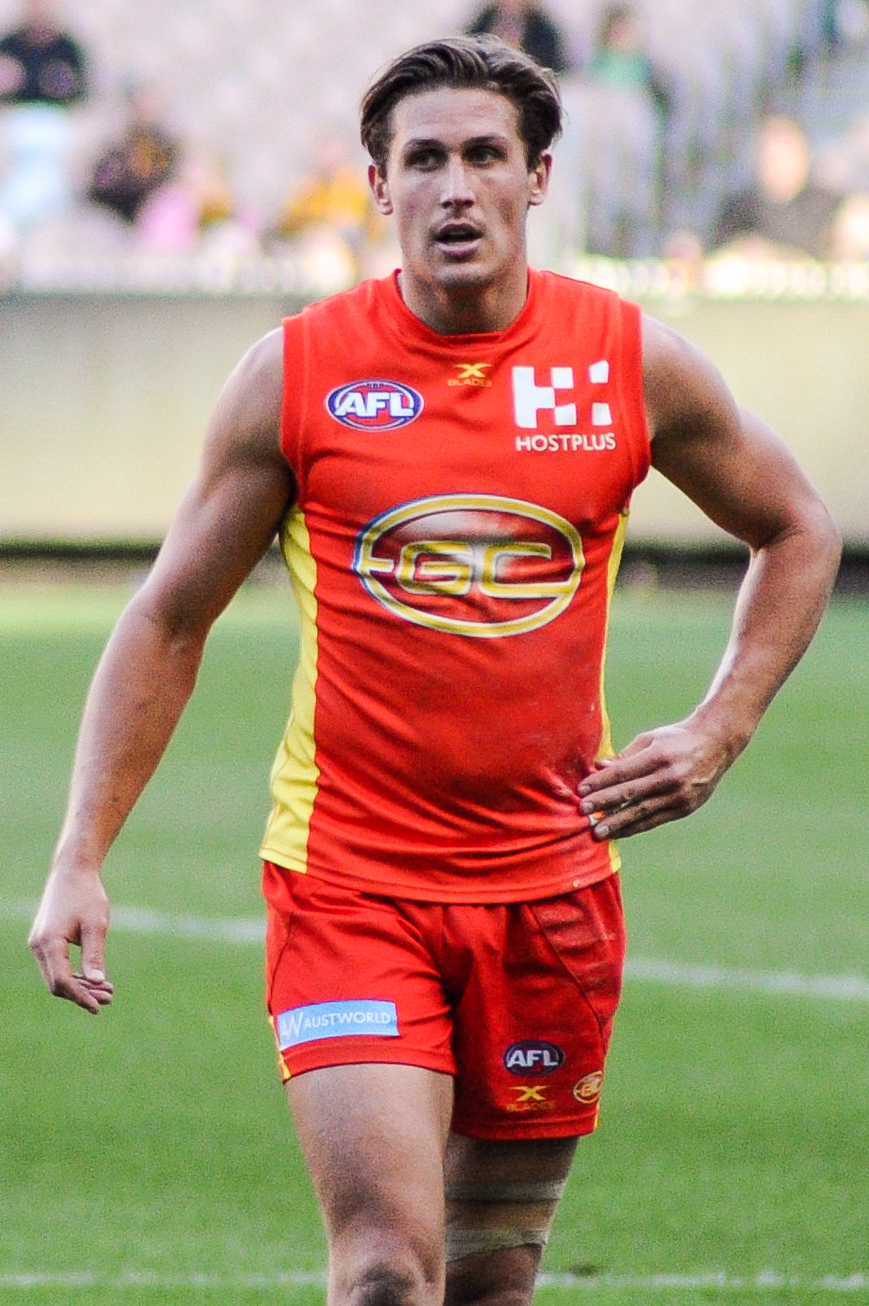
David Swallow holds the record for the most clearances in QClash history (86).

==== Most clearances in a game ====
#	Player	Club	Venue	Year	Round	Clearances
1	(Victoria (state)) Matt Rowell	Gold Coast	Carrara Stadium	2025	Round 20	15
2	(Northern Territory) Jared Brennan	Gold Coast	The Gabba	2011	Round 7	14
3	(Victoria (state)) Jarryd Lyons	Brisbane Lions	Carrara Stadium	2022	Round 6	13
3	(Victoria (state)) Matt Rowell	Gold Coast	Carrara Stadium	2022	Round 6	13
5	(Victoria (state)) Oscar McInerney	Brisbane	The Gabba	2021	Round 19	12

==== Most career clearances ====
#	Player	Club	Games	Clearances
1	(Western Australia) David Swallow	Gold Coast	24	86
2	(Victoria (state)) Touk Miller	Gold Coast	19	84
3	(South Australia) Lachie Neale	Brisbane Lions	13	80
4	(Queensland) Dayne Zorko	Brisbane Lions	27	76
4	(Victoria (state)) Hugh McCluggage	Brisbane Lions	17	76

=== Tackles ===
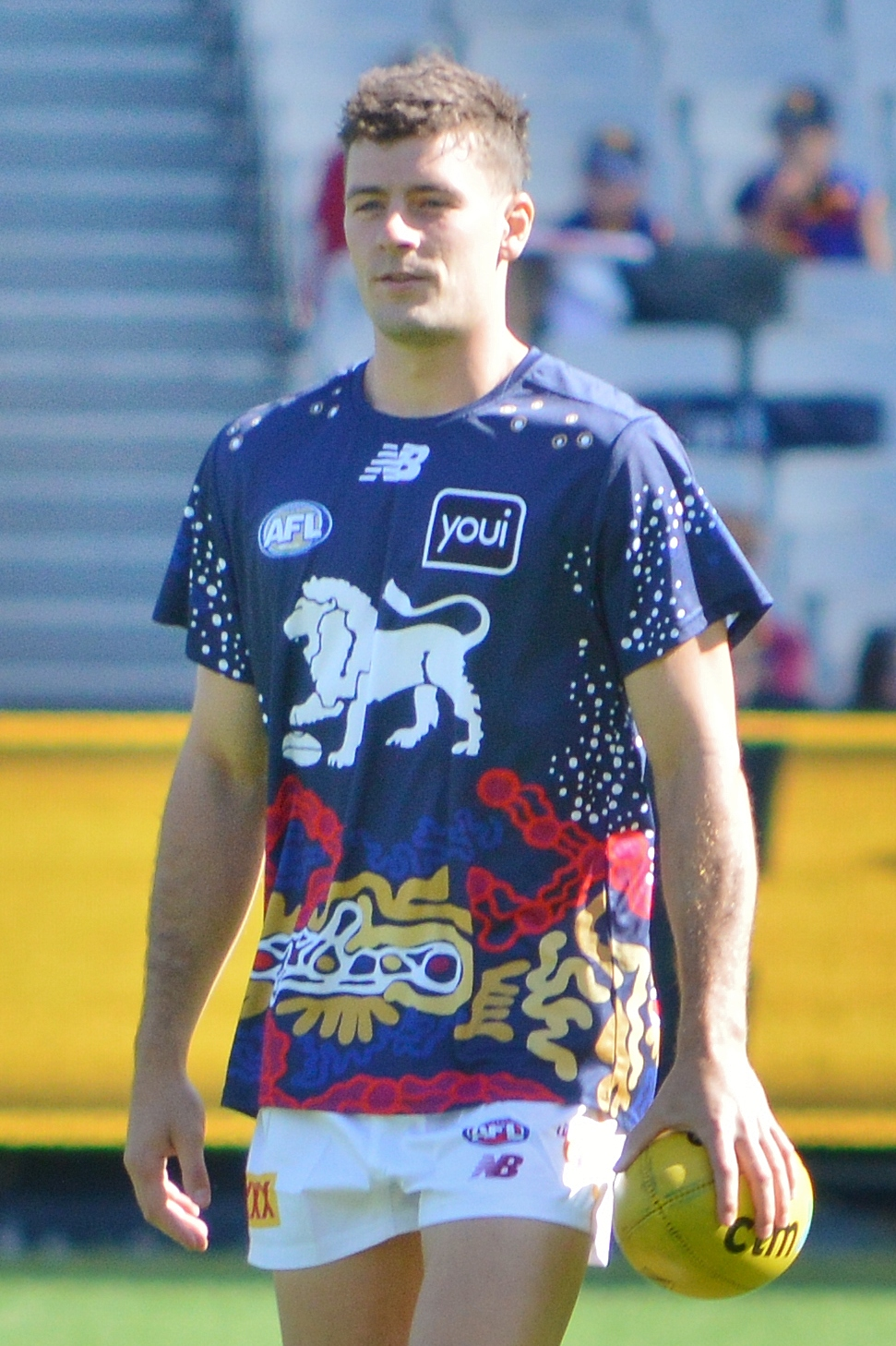
Josh Dunkley holds the record for the most tackles in a QClash (18).

==== Most tackles in a game ====
#	Player	Club	Venue	Year	Round	Tackles
1	(Victoria (state)) Josh Dunkley	Brisbane Lions	The Gabba	2025	Semi-final	18
2	(Victoria (state)) Josh Dunkley	Brisbane Lions	Carrara Stadium	2025	Round 20	14
3	(Victoria (state)) Matt Rowell	Gold Coast	Carrara Stadium	2023	Round 20	13
4	(Western Australia) Jaeger O'Meara	Gold Coast	The Gabba	2014	Round 8	13
5	(Victoria (state)) Matt Rowell	Gold Coast	The Gabba	2023	Round 10	12
5	(Victoria (state)) Matt Rowell	Gold Coast	Carrara Stadium	2025	20	12

==== Most career tackles ====
#	Player	Club	Games	Tackles
1	(Queensland) Dayne Zorko	Brisbane Lions	27	145
2	(Victoria (state)) Touk Miller	Gold Coast	19	97
3	(Western Australia) David Swallow	Gold Coast	24	91
4	(Victoria (state)) Matt Rowell	Gold Coast	11	79
5	(Victoria (state)) Josh Dunkley	Brisbane Lions	8	76

=== Career Brownlow votes ===
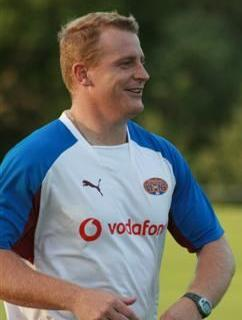
Queensland junior and triple Brisbane Lions AFL Premiership captain Michael Voss holds the second-best winning percentage of any coach in QClash history (83.3%).

#	Player	Club	Games	Votes
1	(Victoria (state)) Jarryd Lyons	Brisbane Lions; Gold Coast	11	12
1	(South Australia) Lachie Neale	Brisbane Lions	12	12
2	(Republic of Ireland) Pearce Hanley	Brisbane Lions; Gold Coast	14	10
3	(Queensland) Dayne Beams	Brisbane Lions	5	9
3	(Victoria (state)) Touk Miller	Gold Coast	18	9
3	(Victoria (state)) Tom Rockliff	Brisbane Lions	13	9

=== All-time coaching record ===
Current AFL Head Coach

Coach	Club	Win	Loss	Draw	Games	Win %	Diff
(Tasmania) Chris Fagan	Brisbane	15	3	0	17	83.33	+11
(Queensland) Michael Voss	Brisbane	5	1	0	6	83.33	+4
(Victoria (state)) Steven King	Gold Coast	1	0	0	1	100 .00	+1
(Tasmania) Rodney Eade	Gold Coast	3	2	0	5	60.00	+1
(New South Wales) Dean Solomon	Gold Coast	0	1	0	1	0.00	−1
(Victoria (state)) Justin Leppitsch	Brisbane	2	4	0	6	33.33	−2
(Victoria (state)) Damien Hardwick	Gold Coast	1	5	0	5	16.66	−4
(Western Australia) Guy McKenna	Gold Coast	2	6	0	8	25.00	−4
(South Australia) Stuart Dew	Gold Coast	1	9	0	10	10.00	−8

== QClash Results (AFLW) ==
The first AFLW QClash was played on 22 February 2020 at Carrara Stadium and resulted in a draw.

=== Results ===
	Season	Date	Rd	Home Team	Score	Away Team	Score	Ground	Crowd	Winner	H2H	QClash Medal	Report
1	2020	22 February	3	Gold Coast	4.4 (28)	Brisbane	4.4 (28)	Carrara Stadium	4,223	Draw	0	Kate Lutkins	
2	2021	7 February	2	Brisbane	10.5 (65)	Gold Coast	0.2 (2)	Hickey Park	2,101	Brisbane by 63	+1	Jesse Wardlaw	
3	2022 (S6)	17 February	7	Gold Coast	2.4 (16)	Brisbane	12.13 (85)	Carrara Stadium	1,105	Brisbane by 69	+2	Courtney Hodder	
4	2022 (S7)	10 September	3	Brisbane	12.10 (82)	Gold Coast	1.3 (9)	The Gabba	2,582	Brisbane by 73	+3	Emily Bates	
5	2023	14 October	7	Gold Coast	3.3 (21)	Brisbane	8.9 (57)	Carrara Stadium	1,873	Brisbane by 36	+4	Ally Anderson	
6	2024	12 October	7	Brisbane	6.8 (44)	Gold Coast	4.4 (28)	Springfield Central Stadium	3,142	Brisbane by 16	+5	Belle Dawes	

=== Statistics ===
Correct as of end of season 7.

Current AFLW-listed players

==== Most career goals ====
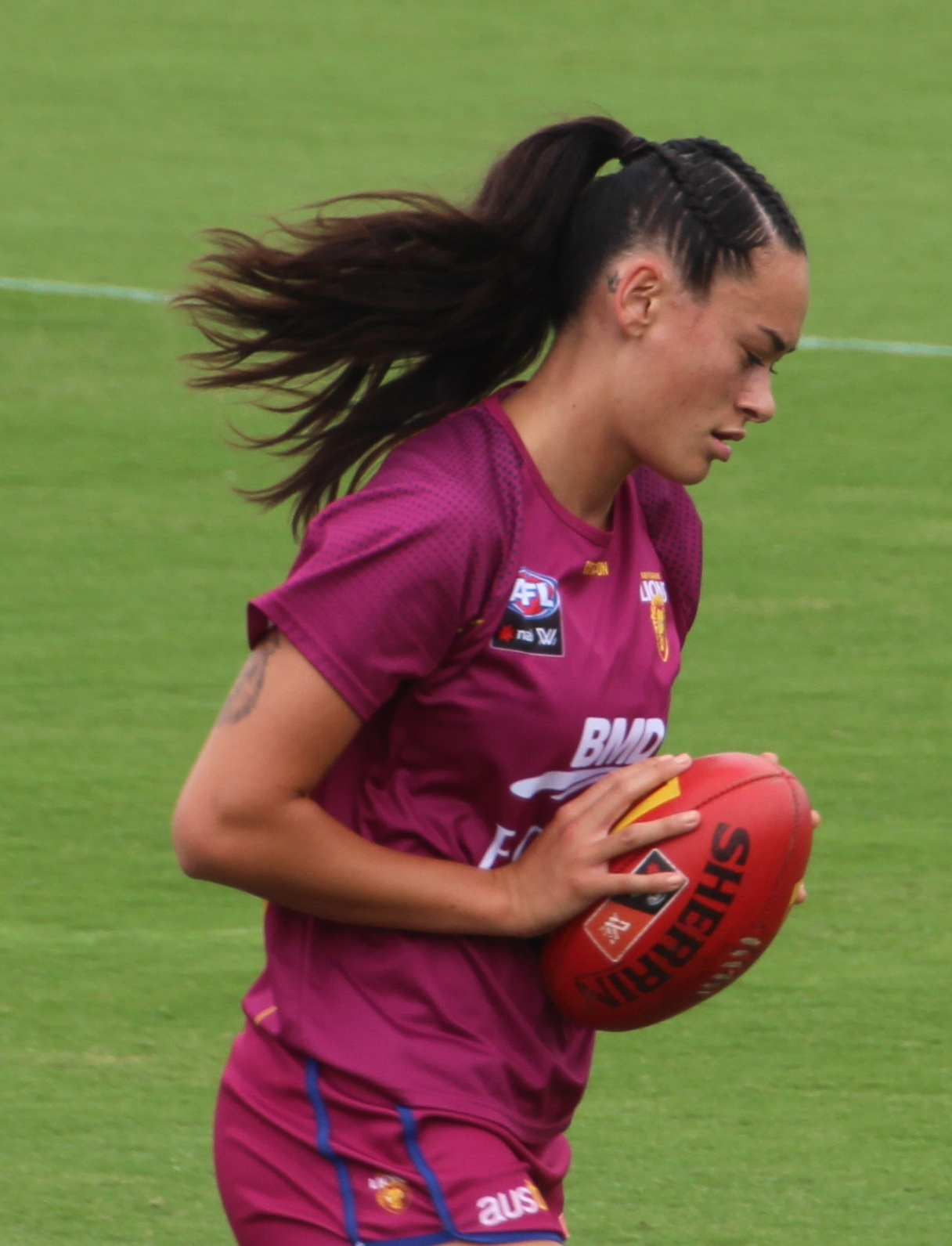
Jesse Tawhiao-Wardlaw has kicked the most career QClash goals (10).

#	Player	Club	Goals	Games
1	(New Zealand) Jesse Tawhiao-Wardlaw	Brisbane	10	4
2	(Queensland) Greta Bodey	Brisbane	5	4
3	(Queensland) Dakota Davidson	Brisbane	4	3
3	(Queensland) Taylor Smith	Gold Coast; Brisbane	4	3
5	(Queensland) Zimmorlei Farquharson	Brisbane	3	2
5	(Queensland) Kalinda Howarth	Brisbane; Gold Coast	3	3

==== Two-club players ====
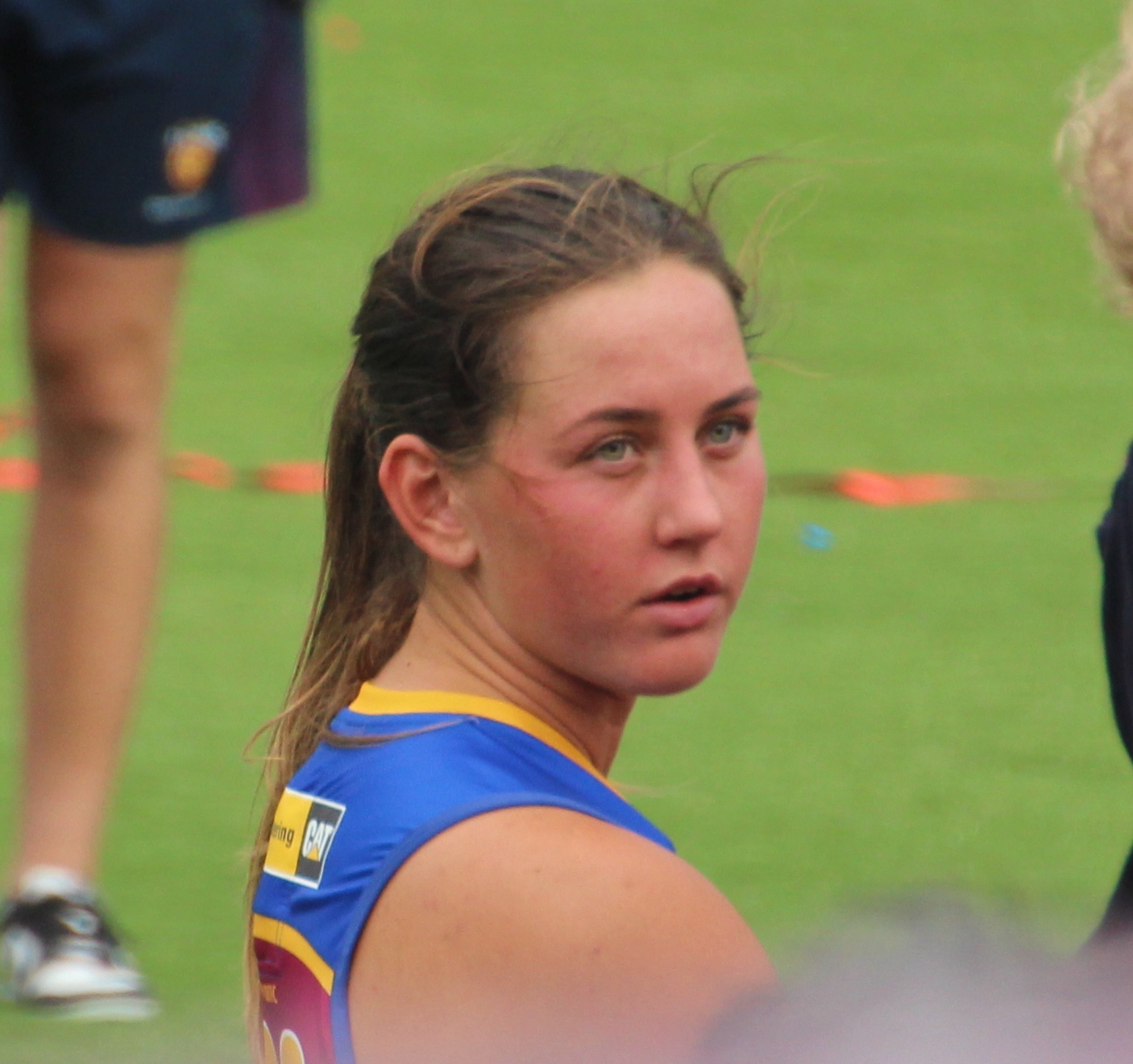
Dee Heslop is the only player to have appeared in QClashes for both Brisbane and Gold Coast.

Below is a list of players who spent time at both the Brisbane Lions and Gold Coast Suns, in order of appearance for their second of the two clubs.

Order of playing for second club	Player	Games Played for Brisbane (Years Listed)	Games Played for Gold Coast (Years Listed)	Number of QClashes Played
1	(Queensland) Lauren Bella	3 (2019)	36 (2020–)	4
1	(Queensland) Tori Groves-Little	2 (2019)	11 (2020–2022 (S7))	1
1	(Queensland) Kalinda Howarth	0 (2018)	34 (2020–)	3
1	(Queensland) Leah Kaslar	21 (2017–2019)	15 (2020–2021)	2
1	(Queensland) Paige Parker	4 (2019)	13 (2020–2021)	1
1	(Queensland) Emma Pittman	8 (2018–2019)	2 (2020–2022 (S6))	0
1	(Queensland) Molly Ritson	0 (2018)	9 (2020–2021)	1
1	(Queensland) Jamie Stanton	16 (2017–2018)	25 (2020–)	3
1	(South Australia) Sam Virgo	15 (2017–2019)	14 (2020–2021)	2
1	(Queensland) Jacqui Yorston	4 (2019)	15 (2020–2022 (S6))	2
11	(Queensland) Taylor Smith	35 (2021–)	1 (2020)	3
12	(Queensland) Dee Heslop	11 (2022 (S7)–)	23 (2020–2022 (S6))	4
12	(Queensland) Krystal Scott	0 (2018–2019)	1 (2022 (S7))	0
14	(Queensland) Ellie Hampson	0 (2023–)	23 (2020–2022 (S7))	3
14	(Queensland) Jordan Membrey	5 (2017)	0 (2023–)	0
14	(Queensland) Jade Pregelj	0 (2023–)	19 (2020–2022 (S7))	2

=== All-time coaching record ===
Current AFLW Head Coach

Coach	Club	Win	Loss	Draw	Games	Win %	Diff
(Western Australia) Craig Starcevich	Brisbane	3	0	0	3	100	+3
(Queensland) Daniel Merrett	Brisbane	0	0	1	1	0	0
(Victoria (state)) David Lake	Gold Coast	0	1	1	2	0	−1
(Victoria (state)) Cameron Joyce	Gold Coast	0	2	0	2	0	−2

== See also ==
- Showdown
- Sydney Derby (Battle Of The Bridge)
- Western Derby
