= Matthew Leuenberger =

Australian rules footballer

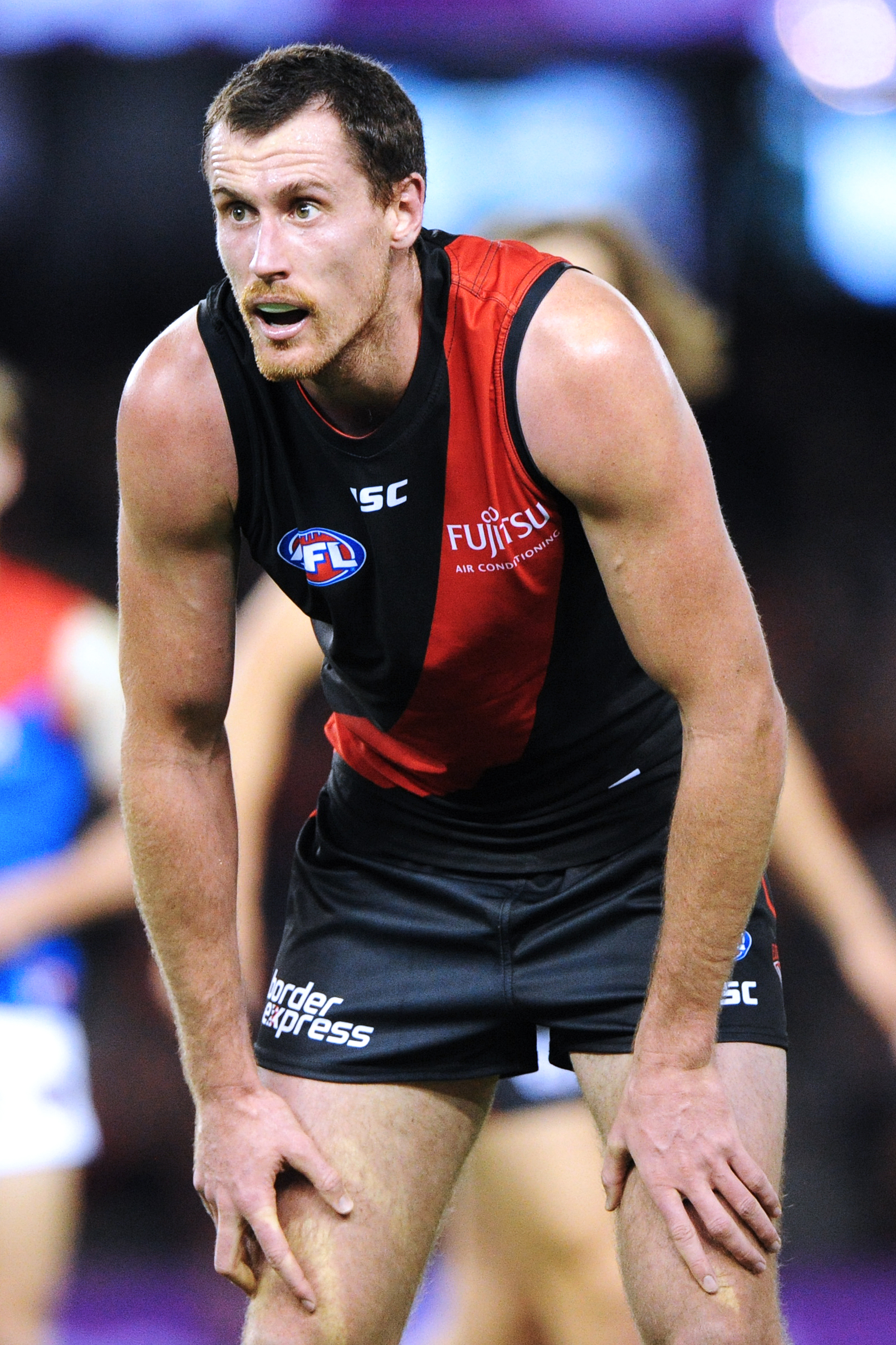
- Leuenberger playing for Essendon in April 2018

Personal information
- Full name: Matthew Leuenberger
- Born: 7 June 1988 (age 38)
- Original team: East Perth (WAFL)
- Draft: No. 4, 2006 national draft
- Height: 202 cm (6 ft 8 in)
- Weight: 105 kg (231 lb)
- Position: Ruckman

Playing career^{1}
Years	Club	Games (Goals)
2007–2015	Brisbane Lions	108 (27)
2016–2018	Essendon	29 (4)
Total		137 (31)
- ^{1} Playing statistics correct to the end of 2018.

Career highlights
- Marcus Ashcroft Medal

Matthew Leuenberger (born 7 June 1988) is a former professional Australian rules footballer who played for the Brisbane Lions and the Essendon Football Club in the Australian Football League (AFL).

Leuenberger represented Western Australia in the 2006 AFL Under 18 Championships and was rewarded with All-Australian selection as the ruckman.

Leuenberger was drafted to the Brisbane Lions with their first selection and fourth overall in the 2006 national draft. He made his debut against the West Coast Eagles in round 14, 2007 at Subiaco Oval. His first two seasons saw him play 19 matches, and the first three of 2009 before sustaining a knee injury. He missed the remainder of the season after his knee became infected following surgery, and consequently lost 11 kilograms.

Leuenberger played every match for 2010 and 22 in 2011, and amassed 724 hitouts during 2011, the second most in the league after finals. During the 2012 pre-season, he suffered from tendonitis in his achilles, but was declared fit for the round one match against Melbourne, however, he re-injured his achilles in round three against Fremantle, which saw him miss the remainder of the season.

Leuenberger missed the start of the 2013 season returning from injury, but was recalled to the senior side in round 2. Despite persistent injuries, speculation arose that he would be a trade target as one of the "AFL's most wanted players," however, he re-signed with Brisbane in June, eliminating a potential trade at the end of the season. He was named best-on-ground in the sixth QClash against Gold Coast and was awarded the Marcus Ashcroft Medal, after 20 disposals, 7 tackles, and 29-hitouts.

Leuenberger played the first four games of the 2014 season before succumbing to another long-term injury, where he tore his meniscus and would miss at least three months. After missing more than four months, he returned for the final round clash against Geelong at Simonds Stadium.

The 2015 season saw Leuenberger as the backup ruckman to Stefan Martin and he was predicted to leave Brisbane to a team where he would be the number one ruckman. At seasons end, he decided to leave Brisbane through free agency and nominated Essendon as his club of choice. He officially joined Essendon on 15 October.

After playing 29 games for Essendon and 108 for the Brisbane Lions Leuenberger announced his immediate AFL retirement despite being offered a new contract for 2019.
