= Pearce Hanley =

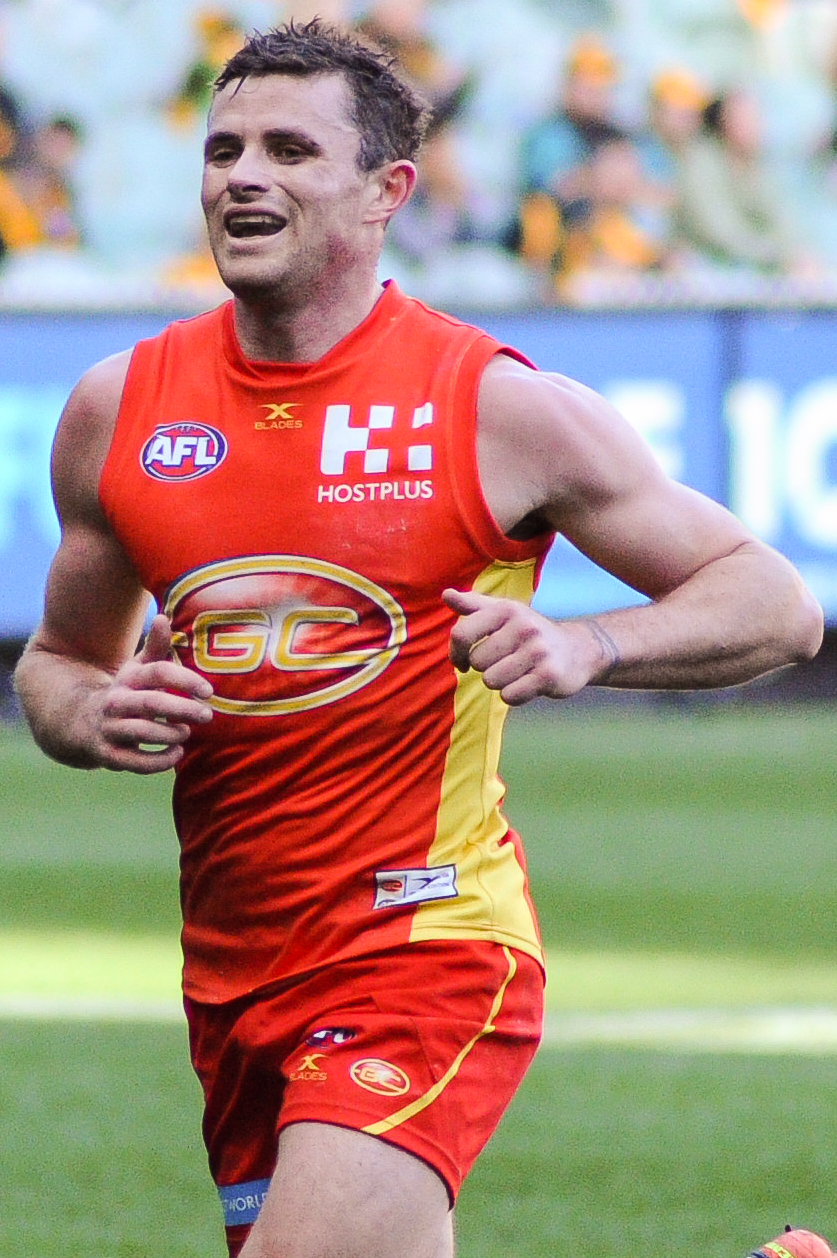
- Hanley playing for Gold Coast in June 2017

Personal information
- Full name: Pearce Hanley
- Born: 15 November 1988 (age 37); England
- Original team: Ballaghaderreen (club)/Mayo (county team)
- Draft: No. 38, 2008 rookie draft
- Height: 185 cm (6 ft 1 in)
- Weight: 85 kg (187 lb)
- Position: Midfielder / Defender

Playing career^{1}
Years	Club	Games (Goals)
2008–2016	Brisbane Lions	129 (58)
2017–2020	Gold Coast	40 (1)
Total		169 (60)

International team honours^{2}
Years	Team	Games (Goals)
2011, 2014	Ireland	2 (0)
- ^{1} Playing statistics correct to the end of 2020.^{2} Representative statistics correct as of 2014.

Career highlights
- 2x Marcus Ashcroft Medal: R18 2014, R4 2016

Pearce Hanley (born 1988 in England) is a former Australian rules footballer who played for the Gold Coast Football Club in the Australian Football League (AFL). He previously played with the Brisbane Lions from 2008 to 2016. A former Gaelic footballer, he played for the Mayo county team and is from Ballaghaderreen, where he played his club football.

== Early life ==
Hanley was born in England to an Irish father and a Welsh mother. He and his family moved to Ballaghaderreen in County Roscommon at a young age. He is one of six siblings in his immediate family.

== Gaelic football ==
Pearce made his senior debut in 2007 against Cavan. Hanley had previously won the Ron Barassi Medal for the best player of the International Rules Series for the Irish U-17 international rules team against Australia in 2005. It was there that he was first scouted by recruiters from Australia and he was targeted for recruitment by the Brisbane Lions as being a potential AFL player.

== Australian rules football ==
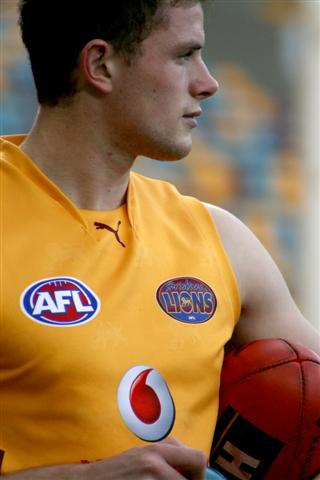
Hanley with Brisbane in 2007

In 2007, Pearce was signed by the Brisbane Lions, and put on the rookie list with a view of converting him to Australian rules football. At the Lions, he was mentored by fellow Irishman Colm Begley who had previously played with the club for a season. Hanley made rapid progress and his adaptation to Australian football was almost as rapid as Begley's. He impressed in an early intra-club hit-out and was a solid performer for the Suncoast Lions.

Called up by coach Leigh Matthews, he made his debut in the final Lions home match in 2008 against the Carlton Football Club in front of a crowd of 35,000 at the Brisbane Cricket Ground, replacing Begley in the side. At the end of the 2009 season, Hanley was elevated to the Lions' senior list.

Hanley went on to become an integral part of the Lions' side as a highly damaging rebound defender. In round 18, 2014 in QClash8 Hanley amassed a whopping 44 touches and won the Marcus Ashcroft Medal.

At the conclusion of the 2016 season, Hanley was traded to the Gold Coast Football Club.

In September 2020, Hanley announced his retirement from AFL, effective immediately.

== Statistics ==
Statistics are correct to the end of the 2016 season

Legend
G	Goals	K	Kicks	D	Disposals	T	Tackles
B	Behinds	H	Handballs	M	Marks

Season	Team	No.	Games	Totals							Averages (per game)						
Season	Team	No.	Games	G	B	K	H	D	M	T	G	B	K	H	D	M	T
2008	Brisbane Lions	42	2	0	0	17	10	27	9	6	0.0	0.0	8.5	5	13.5	4.5	3.0
2009	Brisbane Lions	42	1	0	0	3	7	10	1	0	0.0	0.0	3.0	7.0	10.0	1.0	0.0
2010	Brisbane Lions	42	9	3	0	78	61	139	32	26	0.3	0.0	8.7	6.8	15.4	3.6	2.9
2011	Brisbane Lions	11	22	3	5	299	150	449	130	54	0.1	0.2	13.6	6.8	20.4	5.9	2.5
2012	Brisbane Lions	11	22	7	3	314	147	461	119	53	0.3	0.1	14.3	6.7	21.0	5.4	2.4
2013	Brisbane Lions	11	20	16	9	296	134	430	98	50	0.8	0.5	14.8	6.7	21.5	4.9	2.5
2014	Brisbane Lions	11	20	6	13	310	194	504	96	81	0.3	0.7	15.5	9.7	25.2	4.8	4.1
2015	Brisbane Lions	11	11	9	9	151	88	239	58	33	0.8	0.8	13.7	8.0	21.7	5.3	3.0
2016	Brisbane Lions	11	22	14	17	269	197	466	91	83	0.6	0.8	12.2	9.0	21.2	4.1	3.8
Career			129	58	56	1737	988	2725	634	386	0.4	0.4	13.5	7.7	21.1	4.9	3.0

== See also ==
- Irish experiment
- List of players who have converted from one football code to another
