= Marcus Ashcroft Medal =

- Awarded for: The best on ground in QClash football matches
- Location: Queensland
- Country: Australia
- Presented by: AFL
- First award: 2011
- Final award: 2026
- Currently held by: Will Ashcroft (Brisbane Lions)

The Marcus Ashcroft Medal is awarded to the player judged best on ground in the QClash football match played between Brisbane and Gold Coast, both in Queensland, Australia.

It is named after former footballer Marcus Ashcroft, who played junior football on the Gold Coast for Surfers Paradise and Southport as well as 318 games for the Brisbane Bears/Lions between 1989 and 2003. He was both an integral member of Brisbane's triple premiership team and the first Queenslander to play 300 AFL games. He is also a member of Queensland's AFL Team of the Century. His son, Will Ashcroft, won the medal on May 4, 2025 in QClash 28, and again on August 15 2026 in QClash 32.

Current Gold Coast player Touk Miller has won the medal a record four times, whilst former Brisbane Lions' captain Dayne Beams has won the medal three times and Jarryd Lyons, Gary Ablett Jr and Lachie Neale have won the medal twice.

The first QClash final took place in the semi-finals of 2025. The medal was not awarded on this occasion.

== Winners ==
Italics indicate that the award was won by a player on the losing team.

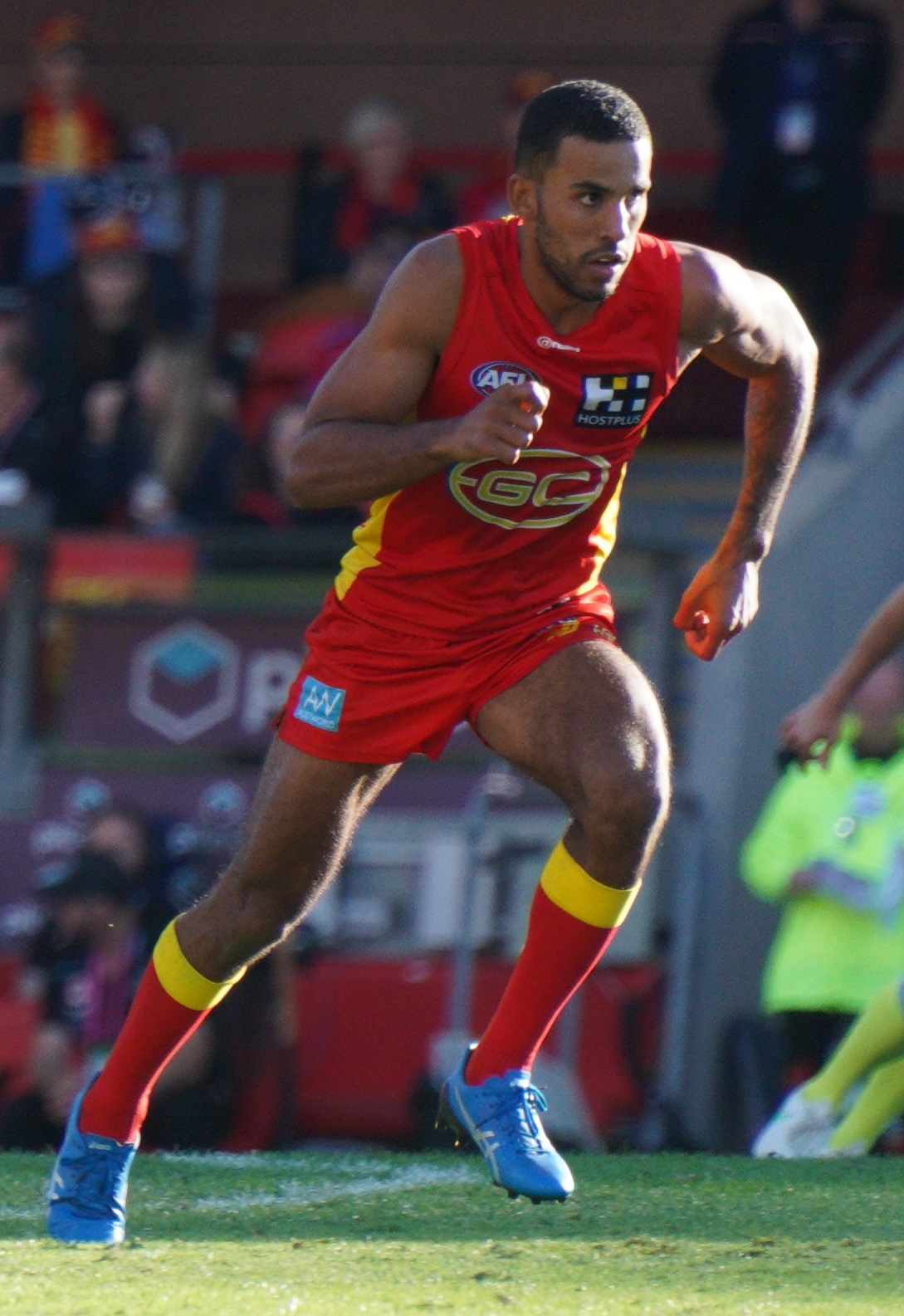
Touk Miller holds the record for the most times to win the award, with four.

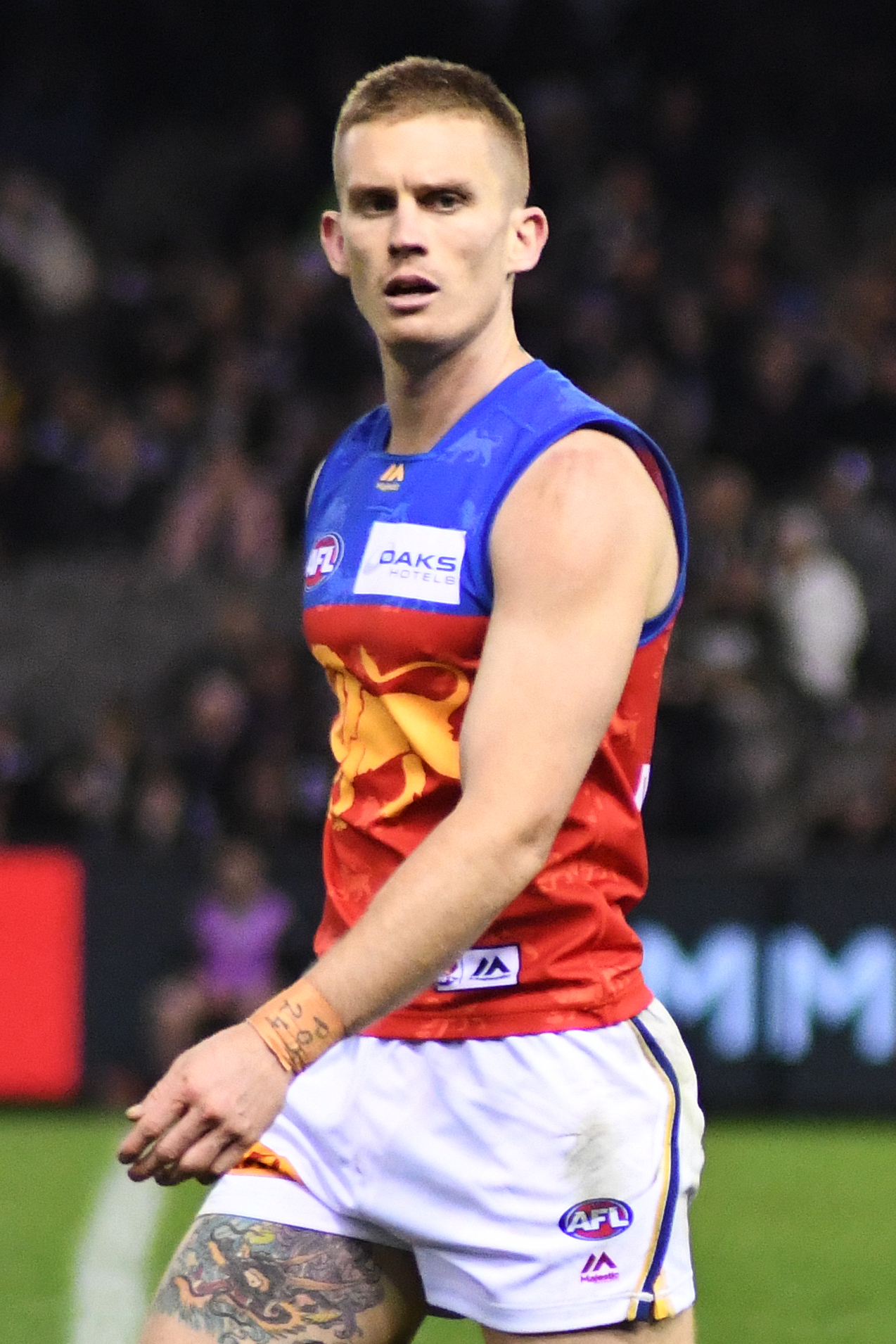
Dayne Beams has won the award three times, the most of any Lion.

Year	Round	Winner
2011	7	Jared Brennan
2011	21	Simon Black
2012	4	Tom Rockliff
2012	17	Gary Ablett Jr.
2013	3	Jonathan Brown
2013	15	Matthew Leuenberger
2014	3	Gary Ablett Jr. ^{(2)}
2014	18	Pearce Hanley
2015	5	Charlie Dixon
2015	19	Tom Lynch
2016	4	Pearce Hanley ^{(2)}
2016	16	Touk Miller
2017	1	Dayne Beams
2017	21	Dayne Beams ^{(2)}
2018	5	Touk Miller ^{(2)}
2018	22	Dayne Beams ^{(3)}
2019	6	Mitch Robinson
2019	21	Charlie Cameron
2020	16	Lachie Neale
2021	9	Jarryd Lyons
2021	19	Jarryd Lyons ^{(2)}
2022	6	Zac Bailey
2022	19	Touk Miller ^{(3)}
2023	10	Lachie Neale ^{(2)}
2023	20	Touk Miller ^{(4)}
2024	8	Dayne Zorko
2024	20	Dayne Zorko ^{(2)}
2025	8	Will Ashcroft
2025	20	Matt Rowell
2026	13	Logan Morris
2026	23	Will Ashcroft ^{(2)}

== Multiple winners ==
^	Denotes current player

No.	Player	Team	Medals
1	Touk Miller	Gold Coast	4
2	Dayne Beams	Brisbane	3
3	Gary Ablett Jr	Gold Coast	2
3	Will Ashcroft	Brisbane	2
3	Pearce Hanley	Brisbane	2
3	Jarryd Lyons	Brisbane	2
3	Lachie Neale	Brisbane	2
3	Dayne Zorko	Brisbane	2

== See also ==
- QClash
- Showdown Medal
- Glendinning–Allan Medal
- Brett Kirk Medal
