= Matt Rowell =

Australian rules football player

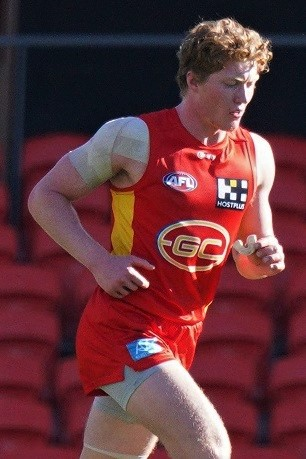
- Rowell playing for Gold Coast in 2021

Personal information
- Full name: Matthew Rowell
- Born: 1 July 2001 (age 25); Sydney, New South Wales
- Original team: Oakleigh Chargers (NAB League)
- Draft: No. 1, 2019 national draft
- Debut: Round 1, 2020, Gold Coast vs. Port Adelaide, at Metricon Stadium
- Height: 180 cm (5 ft 11 in)
- Weight: 78 kg (172 lb)
- Position: Midfielder

Club information
- Current club: Gold Coast
- Number: 18

Playing career^{1}
Years	Club	Games (Goals)
2020–	Gold Coast	128 (38)

Representative team honours^{2}
Years	Team	Games (Goals)
2026–	Victoria	1 (0)
- ^{1} Playing statistics correct to the end of the 2026 season.^{2} Representative statistics correct as of 2026.

Career highlights
- Brownlow Medal: 2025; All-Australian team: 2025; Gold Coast Suns Club Champion: 2025; Marcus Ashcroft Medal: 2025 (game 2); AFL Rising Star nominee: 2020

Matthew Parlane Rowell (born 1 July 2001) is a professional Australian rules footballer playing for the Gold Coast Suns in the Australian Football League (AFL). Rowell was recruited by Gold Coast with the first selection in the 2019 AFL draft and was nominated for the 2020 AFL Rising Star award in round 2 of the 2020 season. Rowell won the Marcus Ashcroft Medal in the second QClash of the 2025 season and went on to win the 2025 Brownlow Medal and selection in the 2025 All-Australian team, along with the Gold Coast Suns Club Champion award.

== Early life ==
Rowell was born in Sydney, New South Wales to a mother from Victoria and a father from Queensland. The family moved to Melbourne when Rowell was a child and he began playing football when his father took him to Mont Albert to participate in Auskick. He played the majority of his junior football with the Canterbury Cobras and was touted as a future AFL player as early as the under 10 level. He played with fellow AFL star, Nick Daicos and Gold Coast Suns teammate, Noah Anderson. As Rowell progressed through the junior ranks, he was given an opportunity to debut in the TAC Cup for the Oakleigh Chargers a month after his 16th birthday. Leading into the 2019 season, Rowell was considered the early favourite to be selected with the number 1 pick in the 2019 AFL draft. He showed his worth by dominating for Victoria Metro at the AFL Under 18 National Championships and playing a pivotal role in Oakleigh's NAB League premiership season, including a Grand Final performance against the Eastern Ranges in which he recorded 44 disposals and two goals. He was subsequently voted best on ground in the NAB League Grand Final and awarded U18 All-Australian selection. Rowell attended Carey Baptist Grammar School with future Gold Coast teammate Noah Anderson throughout his teenage years. The pair were instrumental in delivering Carey's second ever football APS Premiership in 2019 and raising the profile of the school's football program.

== AFL career ==
=== 2020 ===
Rowell made his AFL debut against Port Adelaide at Metricon Stadium in round 1 of the 2020 AFL season. It was reported before round 2, on 10 June 2020 that he signed a two-year contract extension to remain with the Suns until the end of 2023. The following match, in just his second ever AFL game, Rowell was voted best on ground against one of the then-Premiership favourite teams, the West Coast Eagles, and was awarded the round 2 AFL Rising Star nomination for his 26-disposal, two-goal performance. In round 3, Rowell produced another 20 disposals and two goals in Gold Coast's 53-point win over the Adelaide Crows in another best on ground performance. Round 4 saw Rowell collect another 20 disposals and kick two goals against the Fremantle Dockers, in another best on ground performance.

In the Suns' round 5 loss to Geelong, Rowell suffered a dislocated shoulder in the first quarter during a heavy tackle from Brandan Parfitt and took no further part in the game. Rowell opted for surgery in order to repair his shoulder, a choice which caused him to be sidelined for three months. The injury was likened to Gary Ablett Jr.'s 2014 injury of the same nature, and was deemed 'eerily similar' as almost six years to the day, Ablett also suffered a season-ending shoulder injury (to Brent Macaffer) during a tackle whilst playing for Gold Coast. Both Rowell and Ablett were tackled by players wearing the number 3. Ablett offered to be Rowell's mentor during his recovery as Ablett had experience with injury himself.

Rowell’s performance in the early rounds of the year was widely considered extremely impressive, with commenters deeming him among the greatest first-year players. Rowell was considered by Gavin Wanganeen at the time to be a potential contender for the Brownlow Medal.

=== 2021 ===
Rowell returned from injury in round 1 of the 2021 AFL season, playing against the West Coast Eagles at Perth Stadium, on Sunday 21 March 2021. Early in the first term, Rowell was forcefully tackled by Zac Langdon, landing heavily on his left knee. He limped to the bench and was assessed in the medical rooms, following which he was substituted out of the game and replaced by Nick Holman. He later emerged with a knee brace.

Coach Stewart Dew provided an update before the start of the third quarter:

It’s not ‘serious’ serious, but it’s serious enough that it’ll keep him out, from what we can tell right now, for a few weeks ... But we don’t think it’s anything too major.

On 23 March 2021, it was reported that scans had confirmed "a partial tear of his posterior cruciate ligament" and would be unable to play for 10 to 12 weeks.

On 20 April 2021, it was reported that Rowell was on track for a mid-season return in round 14 against the Port Adelaide Power at Carrara Stadium.

On 10 June 2021, it was reported that Rowell would be selected to play against Fremantle in round 13. "He's ready, he's absolutely ready", Coach Dew said. "Physically his body is better prepared than what it was leading into round one." "We're just excited he can play a game of footy again and the most excited person is Rowelly himself, which is great to see, it just shows what footy means to him and it's good to see that spring in his step again."

Rowell played out the rest of the season, however played injured and looked "noticeably out of sorts", averaging just 14.1 disposals in the 2021 season, well below his output before his 2020 injury.

=== 2022 ===
Following a "solid off-season", Rowell returned in round one and produced a career best performance with 33 disposals (17 kicks and 16 handballs), 22 contested possessions, 10 score involvements, nine clearances and six tackles, in a 27 point win over the West Coast Eagles. Rowell played all 22 home-and-away season games for the Gold Coast in 2022 at an average of 19 disposals. He signed a contract extension following the season, committing to the club through to the end of 2025.

=== 2023 ===
Rowell had another brilliant season in 2023 in which he played 23 out of 23 possible matches for the Gold Coast Suns. Rowell received 12 Brownlow votes in 2023, including two 3-vote games (rounds 9 & 11) and polled the 2nd-most votes for the Suns, only behind fellow young superstar Noah Anderson. Additionally, Rowell's 2023 tally of 190 tackles is an all-time VFL/AFL record for most tackles in a season.

=== 2025 ===
In 2025, Rowell had a career-best season as the Suns made their first finals series. Rowell won the 2025 Brownlow medal with a total of 39 votes, as well as earning All-Australian honours and winning Gold Coast's best and fairest award.

== Statistics ==
Updated to the end of round 22, 2026.

Legend
G	Goals	K	Kicks	D	Disposals	T	Tackles
B	Behinds	H	Handballs	M	Marks
†	Led the league for the season	±	Won that season's Brownlow Medal

Season	Team	No.	Games	Totals							Averages (per game)							Votes
Season	Team	No.	Games	G	B	K	H	D	M	T	G	B	K	H	D	M	T	Votes
2020 (Note: The 2020 season was played with 17 home-and-away matches per team (down from 22) and 16-minute quarters with time on (down from 20-minute quarters with time on) due to the impact of the COVID-19 pandemic.)	Gold Coast	18	5	6	0	38	49	87	4	27	1.2	0.0	7.6	9.8	17.4	0.8	5.4	9
2021	Gold Coast	18	12	2	0	66	103	169	22	49	0.2	0.0	5.5	8.6	14.1	1.8	4.1	0
2022	Gold Coast	18	22	2	4	214	194	408	27	158	0.1	0.2	9.7	8.8	18.5	1.2	7.2	4
2023	Gold Coast	18	23	7	2	273	214	487	43	190^{†}	0.3	0.1	11.9	9.3	21.2	1.9	8.3^{†}	12
2024	Gold Coast	18	23	8	3	244	294	538	32	184	0.3	0.1	10.6	12.8	23.4	1.4	8.0^{†}	25
2025	Gold Coast	18	25	10	7	308	349	657	41	214	0.4	0.3	12.3	14.0	26.3	1.6	8.6	39^{±}
2026	Gold Coast	18	16	3	3	213	202	415	37	113	0.2	0.2	13.3	12.6	25.9	2.3	7.1	0
Career			126	38	19	1356	1405	2761	206	935	0.3	0.2	10.8	11.2	21.9	1.6	7.4	89

== Honours and achievements ==
- Brownlow Medal: 2025
- All-Australian team: 2025
- Gold Coast Suns Club Champion: 2025
- Marcus Ashcroft Medal: 2025 (game 2)
- AFL Rising Star nominee: 2020
