= Marty Lyons (Australian footballer) =

Australian rules footballer

Personal information
- Full name: Marty Lyons
- Born: 4 September 1956 (age 70)
- Original team: Sandringham
- Height: 183 cm (6 ft 0 in)
- Weight: 80.5 kg (177 lb)

Playing career^{1}
Years	Club	Games (Goals)
1975–77	Melbourne	27 (16)
- ^{1} Playing statistics correct to the end of 1977.

Marty Lyons (born 4 September 1956) is a former Australian rules footballer who played with Melbourne in the Victorian Football League (VFL).

His son, Jarryd made his debut for Adelaide in 2011 and was traded to the Gold Coast in 2017. His other son Corey was drafted to Brisbane Lions during the 2016 AFL draft.
