= 2025 All-Australian team =

Honorary Australian rules football team

The 2025 All-Australian team represents the best performed Australian Football League (AFL) players during the 2025 season. It was announced in August as a complete Australian rules football team of 22 players. The team is honorary and does not play any games.

== Selection panel ==
The selection panel for the 2025 All-Australian team consisted of chairman Andrew Dillon, Eddie Betts, Jude Bolton, Nathan Buckley, Kane Cornes, Abbey Holmes, Glen Jakovich, Matthew Pavlich and Laura Kane.

== Team ==
=== Initial squad ===
The initial 44-man All-Australian squad was announced on 26 August, with all clubs except Carlton, Essendon, North Melbourne and West Coast having at least one player nominated.

Adelaide, Brisbane Lions, Gold Coast and Western Bulldogs had the most players selected in the initial squad with 5.

Club	Total	Player(s)
Adelaide	5	Jordan Dawson, Mark Keane, Izak Rankine, Riley Thilthorpe, Josh Worrell
Brisbane Lions	5	Harris Andrews, Zac Bailey, Josh Dunkley, Hugh McCluggage, Dayne Zorko
Carlton	0	
Collingwood	3	Josh Daicos, Nick Daicos, Jamie Elliott
Essendon	0	
Fremantle	4	Andrew Brayshaw, Jordan Clark, Luke Jackson, Caleb Serong
Geelong	3	Jeremy Cameron, Max Holmes, Bailey Smith
Gold Coast	5	Noah Anderson, Sam Collins, Ben King, Ben Long, Matt Rowell
Greater Western Sydney	4	Lachie Ash, Finn Callaghan, Tom Green, Sam Taylor
Hawthorn	2	Josh Battle, Jack Gunston
Melbourne	2	Max Gawn, Kysaiah Pickett
North Melbourne	0	
Port Adelaide	2	Zak Butters, Mitch Georgiades
Richmond	1	Nick Vlastuin
St Kilda	1	Nasiah Wanganeen-Milera
Sydney	2	Brodie Grundy, Isaac Heeney
West Coast	0	
Western Bulldogs	5	Marcus Bontempelli, Bailey Dale, Sam Darcy, Tom Liberatore, Ed Richards

=== Final team ===
Josh Battle, Jordan Clark, Nasiah Wanganeen-Milera, Bailey Smith, Hugh McCluggage, Zac Bailey, Riley Thilthorpe, Kysaiah Pickett, Noah Anderson, Ed Richards and Matt Rowell all made their first All-Australian team, while Max Gawn made a record-equalling 8th selection

2025 All-Australian Team
B:	Josh Battle (Hawthorn)	Sam Taylor (Greater Western Sydney)	Jordan Clark (Fremantle)
HB:	Bailey Dale (Western Bulldogs)	Harris Andrews (Brisbane Lions)	Nasiah Wanganeen-Milera (St Kilda)
C:	Bailey Smith (Geelong)	Jordan Dawson (Adelaide) (vice-captain)	Hugh McCluggage (Brisbane Lions)
HF:	Isaac Heeney (Sydney)	Jeremy Cameron (Geelong) (captain)	Zac Bailey (Brisbane Lions)
F:	Jack Gunston (Hawthorn)	Riley Thilthorpe (Adelaide)	Kysaiah Pickett (Melbourne)
Foll:	Max Gawn (Melbourne)	Noah Anderson (Gold Coast)	Ed Richards (Western Bulldogs)
Int:	Marcus Bontempelli (Western Bulldogs)	Caleb Serong (Fremantle)	Matt Rowell (Gold Coast)
Int:	Nick Daicos (Collingwood)		
Coach:	Chris Fagan (Brisbane Lions)		

Note: the position of coach in the All-Australian team is traditionally awarded to the coach of the premiership team.
