= Noah Anderson =

Australian rules footballer (born 2001)

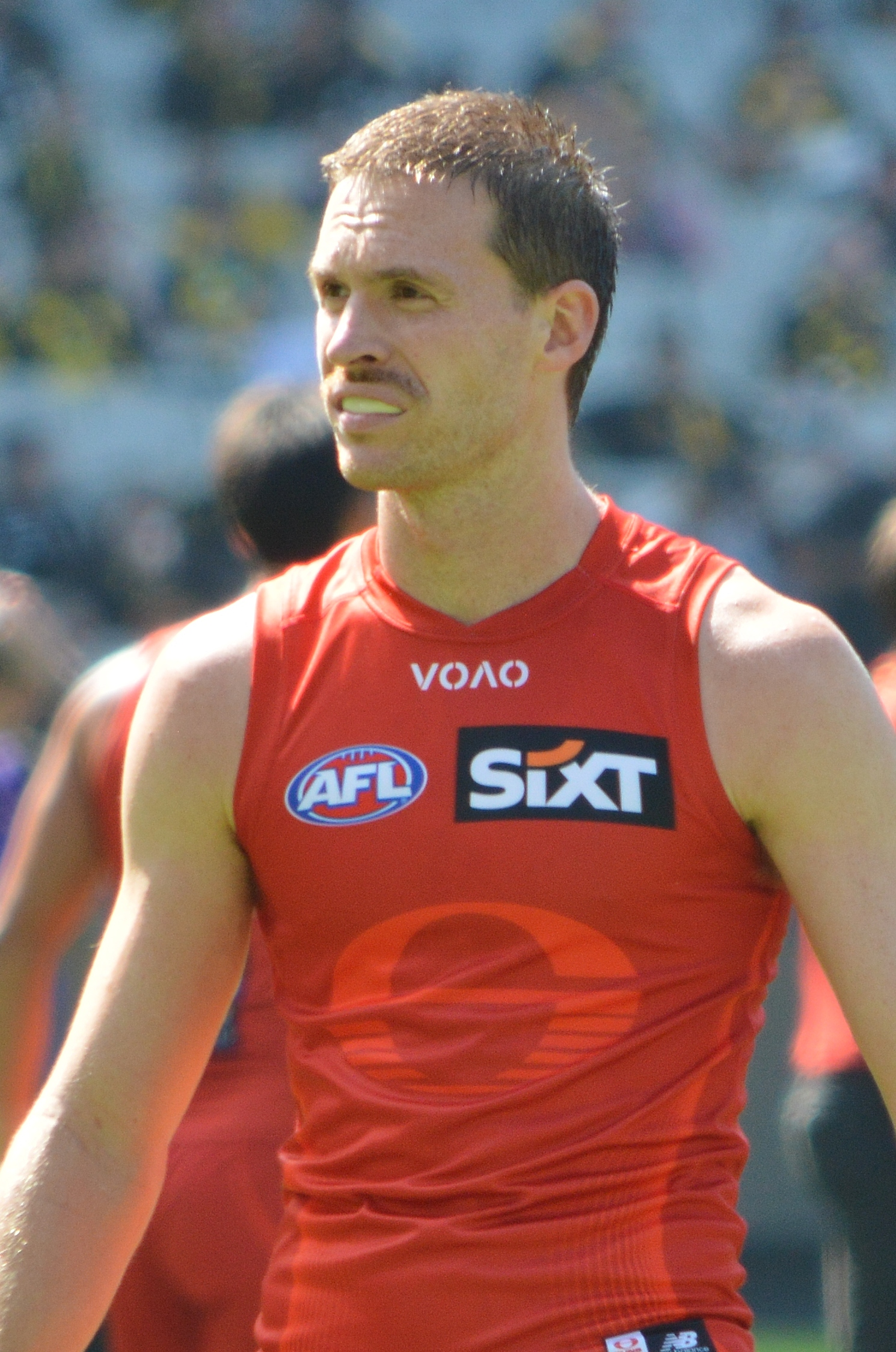
- Anderson in March 2026

Personal information
- Full name: Noah Anderson
- Born: 17 February 2001 (age 25)
- Original teams: Oakleigh Chargers (NAB League), Carey Grammar (APS)
- Draft: No. 2, 2019 national draft
- Debut: Round 1, 2020, Gold Coast vs. Port Adelaide, at Metricon Stadium
- Height: 192 cm (6 ft 4 in)
- Weight: 88 kg (194 lb)
- Position: Midfielder

Club information
- Current club: Gold Coast
- Number: 15

Playing career^{1}
Years	Club	Games (Goals)
2020–	Gold Coast	151 (61)

Representative team honours^{2}
Years	Team	Games (Goals)
2026	Victoria	1 (0)
- ^{1} Playing statistics correct to the end of the 2026 season.^{2} Representative statistics correct as of 2026.

Career highlights
- AFLCA champion player of the year: 2025; Gold Coast captain: 2025–; All-Australian team: 2025; Gold Coast Suns Club Champion: 2023; AFL Rising Star nominee: 2020; AFLCA best young player award: 2021; AFL Goal of the Year: 2025

Noah Anderson (born 17 February 2001) is a professional Australian rules footballer who plays for, and captains, the Gold Coast Suns in the Australian Football League (AFL).

The son of two-time premiership player Dean Anderson, he was recruited to the Suns with the second pick in the 2019 national draft. He made his debut in the opening round of the 2020 season and finished runner-up in the Rising Star. He was appointed captain of the Suns before the 2025 season and led them to their inaugural finals series.

== Early life ==
Anderson was born in Melbourne to mother Fiona and father Dean Anderson (two-time AFL premiership player). Anderson participated in the Auskick program at Glenferrie in Hawthorn, Victoria and played junior football for the Hawthorn Citizens Junior Football Club in the Yarra Junior Football League at a young age and made his first representative side when he was chosen to represent the under-12 Victorian state team. He attended Carey Baptist Grammar School with future Gold Coast teammate Matthew Rowell throughout their teenage years. As Anderson progressed through the junior ranks, he was given an opportunity to debut in the TAC Cup for the Oakleigh Chargers at 16 years of age. In 2019, he was named in the under-18 All-Australian team for his impressive performances in the AFL Under 18 Championships and played a pivotal role in Oakleigh's NAB League premiership season.

== AFL career ==
=== 2020 ===
Anderson was recruited by the Gold Coast Suns with the 2nd pick in the 2019 AFL draft, alongside best friend Matt Rowell, who was also drafted by the Suns with the number 1 pick. Anderson made his AFL debut against Port Adelaide at Metricon Stadium in round 1 of the 2020 AFL season. He played all 17 games in the 2020 season, which was shortened due to the COVID-19 pandemic. He finished 2nd in the AFL Rising Star Award, behind Caleb Serong.

=== 2021 ===
Anderson played the first 14 games of the 2021 season at an average of 22 disposals before fracturing his hand in the Suns' round 15 match against North Melbourne. Anderson underwent surgery for this injury and missed 2 matches, returning in round 18 against the Western Bulldogs. He was named in the 40 man squad for the AFL's 22 under 22 team following the season.

=== 2022 ===
Anderson was promoted to the Gold Coast's leadership group prior to the start of the 2022 season. He played 21 games for the season and averaged 26 disposals and 6 clearances. He was named in the final 2022 AFL 22 under 22 team. In the 2022 Brownlow Medal count, Anderson received 14 votes, being voted best on ground 3 times. Round 17 saw Anderson kick a goal after the siren to win the game against Richmond.

=== 2023 ===
During the 2023 pre-season, Anderson signed a four-year contract extension with the Suns, through to the end of the 2027 season. He was named Gold Coast Club Champion at the season's end.

== Statistics ==
Updated to the end of round 22, 2026.

Legend
G	Goals	K	Kicks	D	Disposals	T	Tackles
B	Behinds	H	Handballs	M	Marks
†	Led the league for the season

Season	Team	No.	Games	Totals							Averages (per game)							Votes
Season	Team	No.	Games	G	B	K	H	D	M	T	G	B	K	H	D	M	T	Votes
2020 (Note: The 2020 season was played with 17 home-and-away matches per team (down from 22) and 16-minute quarters with time on (down from 20-minute quarters with time on) due to the impact of the COVID-19 pandemic.)	Gold Coast	15	17	4	4	159	122	281	48	32	0.2	0.2	9.4	7.2	16.5	2.8	1.9	0
2021	Gold Coast	15	20	0	6	264	189	453	83	60	0.0	0.3	13.2	9.5	22.7	4.2	3.0	8
2022	Gold Coast	15	21	11	7	383	166	549	92	71	0.5	0.3	18.2	7.9	26.1	4.4	3.4	14
2023	Gold Coast	15	23	14	15	380	239	619	104	79	0.6	0.7	16.5	10.4	26.9	4.5	3.4	22
2024	Gold Coast	15	23	13	8	362	304	666	109	71	0.6	0.3	15.7	13.2	29.0	4.7	3.1	14
2025	Gold Coast	15	25	12	11	369	383	752^{†}	93	76	0.5	0.4	14.8	15.3	30.1	3.7	3.0	25
2026	Gold Coast	15	20	6	10	331	216	547	100	73	0.3	0.5	16.6	10.8	27.4	5.0	3.7	0
Career			149	60	61	2248	1619	3867	629	462	0.4	0.4	15.1	10.9	26.0	4.2	3.1	83

== Honours and Achievements ==
All Australian-2025

Goal of the year-2025

State of Origin selection-2026
