= Touk Miller =

Australian rules footballer (born 1996)

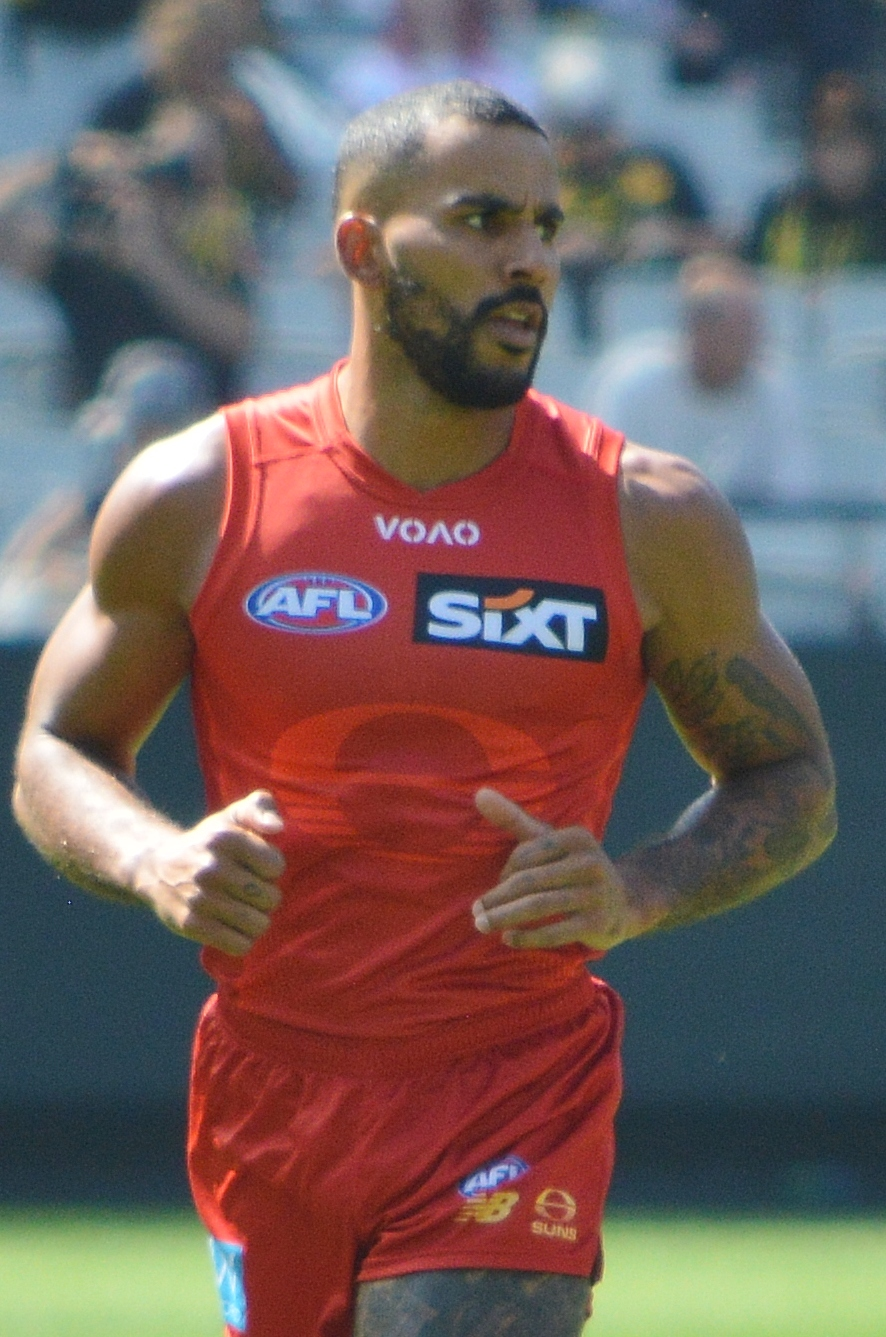
- Miller playing for Gold Coast in March 2026

Personal information
- Full name: Touk Miller
- Nickname: Toik/Toyk
- Born: 22 February 1996 (age 30); Melbourne, Australia
- Original team: Maribyrnong Park (EDFL)/St Kevin's College (APS)/ Calder Cannons (TAC Cup)
- Draft: No. 29, 2014 AFL draft
- Height: 178 cm (5 ft 10 in)
- Weight: 84 kg (185 lb)
- Position: Midfielder

Club information
- Current club: Gold Coast
- Number: 11

Playing career^{1}
Years	Club	Games (Goals)
2015–	Gold Coast	237 (83)
- ^{1} Playing statistics correct to the end of the 2026 season.

Career highlights
- Gold Coast co-captain: 2022–2024; 2× Gold Coast Suns Club Champion: 2021, 2022; 2× All-Australian team: 2021, 2022; AFLCA Champion Player of the Year Award: 2022; 4× Marcus Ashcroft Medal: 2016, 2018, 2022, 2023; AFL Rising Star nominee: 2015

Touk Miller (/ˈtuːk/, rhymes with "Luke"; born 22 February 1996) is a professional Australian rules footballer playing for the Gold Coast Suns in the Australian Football League (AFL). Miller plays as a midfielder and was drafted to the Suns as the 29th overall pick in the 2014 AFL draft.

== Early life ==
Miller was born in Melbourne to an African-American father and an Australian mother of English descent. He lived in the suburb of Ascot Vale. His father, Wylie, is an Ohio-born frontman-singer in the legendary soul band, Grand WaZoo, and a bass guitar soloist, and his mother, Ruth, is a veteran marathon runner and triathlete. Touk started high school in the selective sports academy at Maribyrnong College. He then accepted a scholarship to St Kevin's College for both his football and cricket talents. Miller was selected to represent the under 15 Victorian state cricket team at the national championships in March 2011 and made his first XI debut for the North Melbourne Cricket Club at the Junction Oval in December 2011 before electing to focus on football the following year.

== Junior career ==
Miller played all of his junior years with the Maribyrnong Park Lions in the Essendon District Football League and made his senior debut for the club in 2011 at the age of 15. He played junior football for both St Kevin's College in the APS football competition and the Calder Cannons in the TAC Cup. He also captained both the Cannons and the Vic Metro Under 18 team in the 2014 AFL Under 18 Championships.

== AFL career ==
Miller made his debut for the Suns in round 1 of the 2015 season. Miller earned a rising star nomination in round 16 of that year where he had 27 disposals and two goals against the Greater Western Sydney Giants. In May of 2015, Touk re-signed to the Suns, keeping him contracted to the club until 2017.

Miller was promoted to the Gold Coast vice-captaincy at the beginning of 2019. He played his 100th AFL game in Round 23 against Greater Western Sydney. Despite missing several matches through injury, Miller finished sixth in Gold Coast's 2019 best and fairest count. In May 2021, Miller was handed a one-match ban for rough conduct against St Kilda player Nick Coffield. At the end of the 2021 season, Miller was in the All-Australian team and won the Gold Coast Suns best and fairest

Miller was appointed Gold Coast co-captain for the 2022 season.

Following the 2022 AFL season, Miller was named All Australian, Gold Coast's Club Champion and the AFLCA MVP.

== Personal life ==
Miller was married to Maddie Leek, they got married in October 2024 in Byron Bay and split up in September 2025. Miller dated content creator Stephanie Keenan for ten days in June 2026.

== Statistics ==
Updated to the end of round 22, 2026.

Legend
G	Goals	K	Kicks	D	Disposals	T	Tackles
B	Behinds	H	Handballs	M	Marks

Season	Team	No.	Games	Totals							Averages (per game)							Votes
Season	Team	No.	Games	G	B	K	H	D	M	T	G	B	K	H	D	M	T	Votes
2015	Gold Coast	44	22	7	8	184	190	374	51	111	0.3	0.4	8.4	8.6	17.0	2.3	5.0	0
2016	Gold Coast	11	18	4	6	174	211	385	51	88	0.2	0.3	9.7	11.7	21.4	2.8	4.9	2
2017	Gold Coast	11	20	7	6	135	282	417	67	90	0.4	0.3	6.8	14.1	20.9	3.4	4.5	0
2018	Gold Coast	11	22	6	7	198	287	485	77	123	0.3	0.3	9.0	13.0	22.0	3.5	5.6	4
2019	Gold Coast	11	18	4	3	183	219	402	81	103	0.2	0.2	10.2	12.2	22.3	4.5	5.7	5
2020 (Note: The 2020 season was played with 17 home-and-away matches per team (down from 22) and 16-minute quarters with time on (down from 20-minute quarters with time on) due to the impact of the COVID-19 pandemic.)	Gold Coast	11	17	3	4	177	163	340	50	88	0.2	0.2	10.4	9.6	20.0	2.9	5.2	3
2021	Gold Coast	11	21	8	8	334	334	668	95	149	0.4	0.4	15.9	15.9	31.8	4.5	7.1	17
2022	Gold Coast	11	22	8	11	373	253	626	83	133	0.4	0.5	17.0	11.5	28.5	3.8	6.0	27
2023	Gold Coast	11	13	4	1	191	133	324	50	68	0.3	0.1	14.7	10.2	24.9	3.8	5.2	3
2024	Gold Coast	11	18	4	7	217	257	474	58	87	0.2	0.4	12.1	14.3	26.3	3.2	4.8	5
2025	Gold Coast	11	23	16	12	255	314	569	68	104	0.7	0.5	11.1	13.7	24.7	3.0	4.5	8
2026	Gold Coast	11	21	11	5	219	298	517	78	88	0.5	0.2	10.4	14.2	24.6	3.7	4.2	0
Career			235	82	78	2640	2941	5581	809	1232	0.3	0.3	11.2	12.5	23.7	3.4	5.2	74

== Honours and achievements ==
Individual

- AFLCA Champion Player of the Year Award: 2022
- Gold Coast Suns Club Champion: 2021
- 2× All-Australian team: 2021, 2022
- Gold Coast captain: 2022–
- 4× Marcus Ashcroft Medal: 2016, 2018, 2022, 2023
- AFL Rising Star nominee: 2015 (round 16)
