= Zac Bailey =

Australian rules footballer (born 1999)

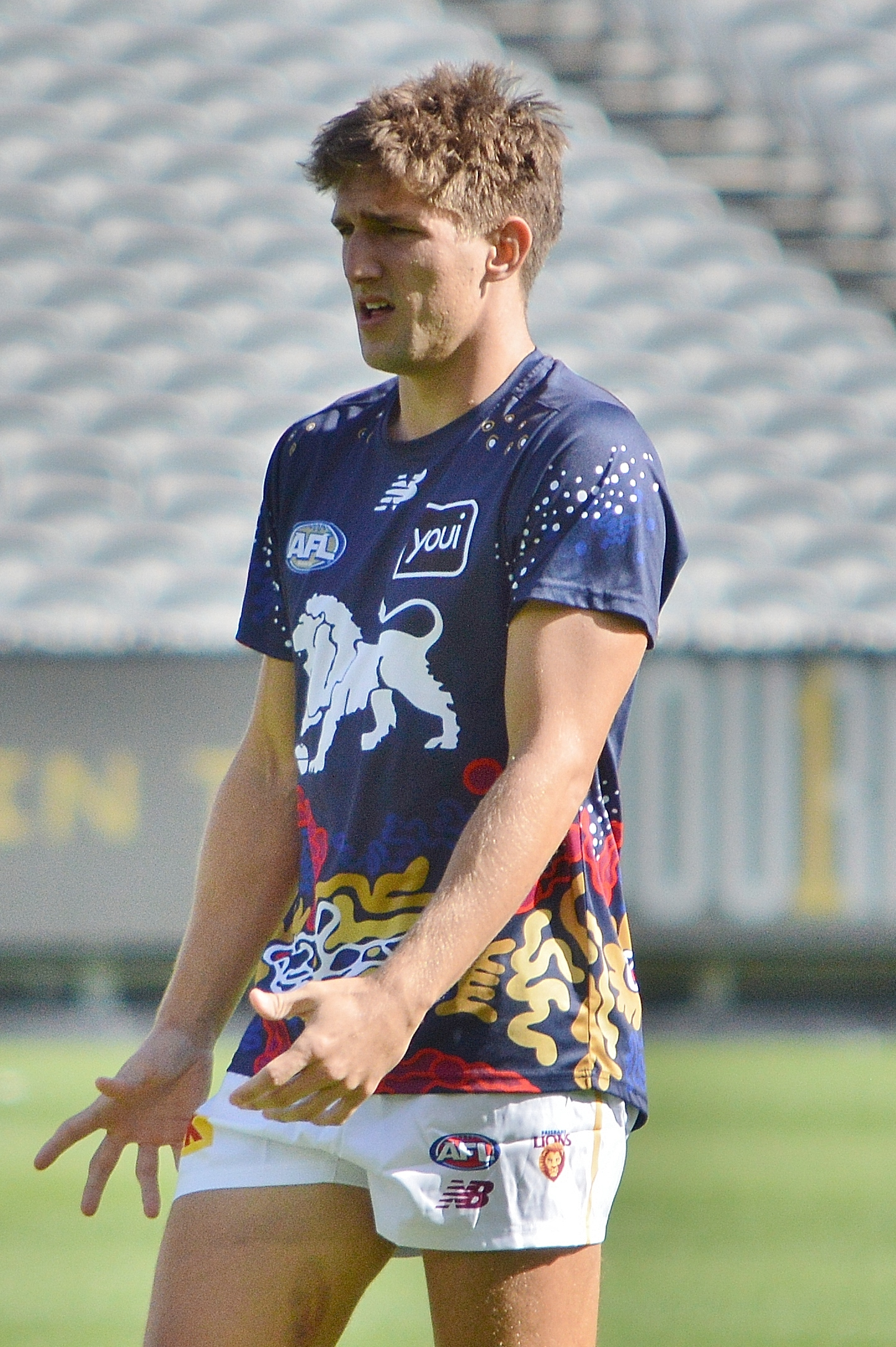
- Bailey in April 2025

Personal information
- Full name: Zachary Karl Bailey
- Born: 23 September 1999 (age 27); Darwin, Northern Territory
- Original teams: Southern Districts (NTFL) / Norwood (SANFL)
- Draft: No. 15, 2017 national draft
- Debut: Round 4, 2018, Brisbane Lions vs. Richmond, at MCG
- Height: 182 cm (6 ft 0 in)
- Weight: 84 kg (185 lb)
- Position: Forward / Midfielder

Club information
- Current club: Brisbane Lions
- Number: 33

Playing career^{1}
Years	Club	Games (Goals)
2018–	Brisbane Lions	186 (215)
- ^{1} Playing statistics correct to the end of round 22, 2026.

Career highlights
- 3× AFL premiership player: 2024, 2025, 2026; 2× All-Australian team: 2025, 2026; 22under22 team: 2021; Marcus Ashcroft Medal: 2022

Zachary Karl Bailey (born 23 September 1999) is a professional Australian rules footballer playing for the Brisbane Lions in the Australian Football League (AFL). He was drafted by Brisbane with their second selection and fifteenth overall in the 2017 national draft.

== Early life ==
Zachary Karl Bailey grew up in Darwin, Northern Territory and played for Southern Districts Football Club. Bailey represented the NT Thunder and Allies at junior level. He moved to Adelaide, South Australia, in 2016 to attend boarding school at Prince Alfred College. While in Adelaide, he played for Norwood Football Club in the SANFL.

== AFL career ==
Bailey made his AFL debut in the ninety-three point loss to Richmond at the Melbourne Cricket Ground in round four of the 2018 season. In round two of 2021, Bailey tackled Geelong's Mark Blicavs in last few seconds of Brisbane's game at GMHBA Stadium that was controversially not paid holding the ball to Bailey. The following week, he kicked the match-winning goal after the siren against Collingwood at Marvel Stadium.

Bailey kicked a goal during the first quarter of the 2023 Grand Final against Collingwood. Brisbane lost the game by a narrow margin. Bailey got his redemption by being a part of the Lions' 2024 premiership winning team, collecting 17 disposals and 7 marks in a 60 point victory over the Sydney Swans. Bailey would go on to accrue five Norm Smith Medal votes in the 2025 AFL Grand Final as the Lions went back-to-back, finishing the match with 3 goals and 6 behinds.

On 8 September 2026, Bailey signed an eight-year contract extension with the Lions.

== Statistics ==
Updated to the end of round 22, 2026.

Legend
G	Goals	K	Kicks	D	Disposals	T	Tackles
B	Behinds	H	Handballs	M	Marks
#	Played in that season's premiership team

Season	Team	No.	Games	Totals							Averages (per game)							Votes
Season	Team	No.	Games	G	B	K	H	D	M	T	G	B	K	H	D	M	T	Votes
2018	Brisbane Lions	33	12	6	4	76	86	162	36	28	0.5	0.3	6.3	7.2	13.5	3.0	2.3	0
2019	Brisbane Lions	33	15	5	5	106	74	180	38	29	0.3	0.3	7.1	4.9	12.0	2.5	1.9	0
2020 (Note: The 2020 season was played with 17 home-and-away matches per team (down from 22) and 16-minute quarters with time on (down from 20-minute quarters with time on) due to the impact of the COVID-19 pandemic.)	Brisbane Lions	33	19	13	9	166	89	255	76	47	0.7	0.5	8.7	4.7	13.4	4.0	2.5	1
2021	Brisbane Lions	33	24	31	18	273	167	440	77	68	1.3	0.8	11.4	7.0	18.3	3.2	2.8	4
2022	Brisbane Lions	33	24	37	18	271	141	412	96	52	1.5	0.8	11.3	5.9	17.2	4.0	2.2	5
2023	Brisbane Lions	33	24	29	19	254	148	402	76	72	1.2	0.8	10.6	6.2	16.8	3.2	3.0	5
2024^{#}	Brisbane Lions	33	22	22	12	218	140	358	94	52	1.0	0.5	9.9	6.4	16.3	4.3	2.4	0
2025^{#}	Brisbane Lions	33	26	42	39	321	199	520	123	60	1.6	1.5	12.3	7.7	20.0	4.7	2.3	6
2026^{#}	Brisbane Lions	33	20	30	19	274	153	427	106	57	1.5	1.0	13.7	7.7	21.4	5.3	2.9	0
Career			186	215	143	1959	1197	3156	722	465	1.2	0.8	10.5	6.4	17.0	3.9	2.5	21

== Honours and achievements ==
Team

- AFL premiership player: 2024, 2025
- McClelland Trophy/Club Championship: 2025

Individual

- 2× All-Australian team: 2025, 2026
- 22under22 team: 2021
- Marcus Ashcroft Medal: 2022
