= Jarryd Lyons =

Australian rules footballer

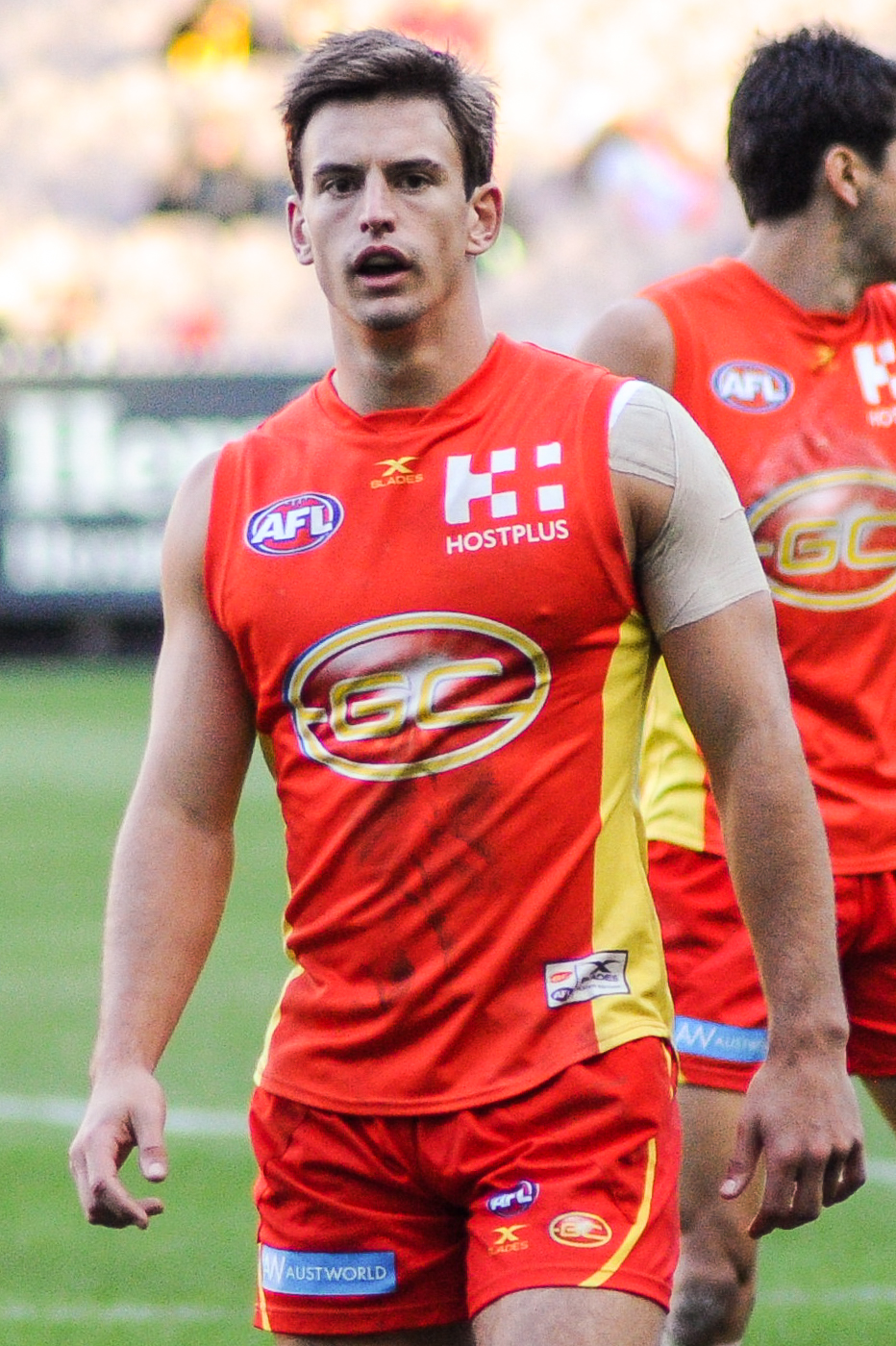
- Lyons playing for Gold Coast in 2017

Personal information
- Full name: Jarryd Lyons
- Born: 22 July 1992 (age 34)
- Original team: Sandringham Dragons (TAC Cup)
- Draft: No. 61, 2010 national draft
- Debut: Round 5, 2012, Adelaide vs. Port Adelaide, at AAMI Stadium
- Height: 184 cm (6 ft 0 in)
- Weight: 84 kg (185 lb)
- Position: Midfielder

Playing career
Years	Club	Games (Goals)
2011–2016	Adelaide	55 (32)
2017–2018	Gold Coast	37 (17)
2019–2024	Brisbane Lions	102 (37)
Total		194 (86)

Career highlights
- 2× Marcus Ashcroft Medal: 2021 (both games); J. J. Liston Trophy: 2023

Jarryd Lyons (born 22 July 1992) is a former professional Australian rules footballer who last played for the Brisbane Lions in the Australian Football League (AFL) before his retirement in 2024. He also previously played for the Adelaide Football Club from 2011 to 2016 and the Gold Coast Suns from 2017 to 2018.

== Early life ==
Lyons' father Marty played 27 games for Melbourne between 1975 and 1977. His younger brother Corey was listed at the Brisbane Lions from 2017 to 2020. Lyons attended Malvern's De La Salle College.

== AFL career ==
=== Adelaide (2011–2016) ===
Lyons was drafted with selection 61 in the 2010 AFL draft by Adelaide, having previously played for the Sandringham Dragons in the TAC Cup. He did not play in his first AFL season, but showed good signs with South Australian National Football League (SANFL) side, Glenelg. Lyons made his AFL debut in round 5 of the 2012 season, against Port Adelaide at AAMI Stadium in Showdown XXXII. He played only three games in that season but continued to perform in the SANFL and could have played more if it hadn't been for an ill-timed foot injury. Lyons played nine games in 2013, including a 21-disposal game against North Melbourne in round 9 and a four-goal effort against Collingwood in round 16. At the end of the season he ignored considerable interest from Melbourne, where his father Marty had played, to stay with the Crows.

Lyons played ten games in 2014, beginning to cement his place in the side in the latter half of the year. Despite again attracting interest in the trading period, Lyons rebuffed all other offers to sign with the Crows for another two years. In late 2014 Lyons was bitten on the leg while asleep and developed symptoms consistent with a white-tailed spider bite, leading to him being hospitalised. He recovered to play 13 games for the 2015 season, nine of them as Adelaide's starting substitute, in what was a trying year for the club, following the mid-season murder of their coach, Phil Walsh. Lyons had his best season at the Crows in 2016, playing 20 games, kicking 15 goals and averaging 22 disposals, in his first season under new coach Don Pyke.

=== Gold Coast (2017–2018) ===
At the conclusion of the 2016 season, Lyons was traded to Gold Coast. Lyons slotted straight into the midfield at the Suns and enjoyed a career-best season in 2017, playing 18 games and averaging 25 disposals, despite the Suns only winning six games and their coach, Rodney Eade, being sacked towards the end of the season. Lyons played 19 games in 2018 and again averaged 25 disposals, and was also equal-third in the AFL for clearances. Despite this, new coach Stuart Dew dropped him twice during the season, and he was delisted at the end of the season with a year left on his three-year contract.

=== Brisbane Lions (2019–2024) ===
Lyons was signed by the Brisbane Lions at the beginning of the 2018 first delisted free agency period on 1 November 2018, the day after his delisting from Gold Coast, joining his younger brother Corey at the club. He made his debut for the club in a 44-point upset win against reigning premiers West Coast at the Gabba in round 1 of the 2019 season, and played his 100th career game in the loss to the Western Bulldogs at Mars Stadium in round 8. After accumulating 33 disposals and eight marks in a best-on-ground performance in the win against Hawthorn at the Gabba in round 11, Lyons had a career-best game in the win against Port Adelaide at Adelaide Oval in round 17, accumulating 36 disposals and nine tackles, and followed up a week later against North Melbourne with 30 disposals and two goals. He went on to poll a career-high 13 votes in the Brownlow Medal and finished fourth in voting for the Merrett–Murray Medal, in what was a career-best season.

On 12 September 2024, Lyons announced his retirement at the end of the club's season, just prior to their semi-final clash with Greater Western Sydney. Lyons will return to SANFL club Glenelg for the 2025 season alongside his brother Corey (already a dual Premiership player at Glenelg).

== Statistics ==
Legend
G	Goals	K	Kicks	D	Disposals	T	Tackles
B	Behinds	H	Handballs	M	Marks

Season	Team	No.	Games	Totals							Averages (per game)							Votes
Season	Team	No.	Games	G	B	K	H	D	M	T	G	B	K	H	D	M	T	Votes
2011	Adelaide	31	0	—	—	—	—	—	—	—	—	—	—	—	—	—	—	0
2012	Adelaide	31	3	1	1	10	16	26	5	6	0.3	0.3	3.3	5.3	8.7	1.7	2.0	0
2013	Adelaide	31	9	5	6	86	63	149	24	22	0.6	0.7	9.6	7.0	16.6	2.7	2.4	0
2014	Adelaide	31	10	7	4	79	54	133	22	25	0.7	0.4	7.9	5.4	13.3	2.2	2.5	0
2015	Adelaide	31	13	4	2	86	64	150	22	25	0.3	0.2	6.6	4.9	11.5	1.7	1.9	0
2016	Adelaide	31	20	15	13	242	191	433	66	94	0.8	0.7	12.1	9.6	21.7	3.3	4.7	0
2017	Gold Coast	25	18	10	8	226	218	444	67	84	0.6	0.4	12.6	12.1	24.7	3.7	4.7	6
2018	Gold Coast	25	19	7	15	281	186	467	51	103	0.4	0.8	14.8	9.8	24.6	2.7	5.4	2
2019	Brisbane Lions	17	24	14	10	338	234	572	72	143	0.6	0.4	14.1	9.8	23.8	3.0	6.0	13
2020 (Note: The 2020 season was played with 17 home-and-away matches per team (down from 22) and 16-minute quarters with time on (down from 20-minute quarters with time on) due to the impact of the COVID-19 pandemic.)	Brisbane Lions	17	19	4	10	255	156	411	64	77	0.2	0.5	13.4	8.2	21.6	3.4	4.1	9
2021	Brisbane Lions	17	24	10	7	395	279	674	119	154	0.4	0.3	16.5	11.6	28.1	5.0	6.4	23
2022	Brisbane Lions	17	22	7	10	316	171	487	87	112	0.3	0.5	14.4	7.8	22.1	4.0	5.1	7
2023	Brisbane Lions	17	10	2	1	47	46	93	12	24	0.2	0.1	4.7	4.6	9.3	1.2	2.4	0
2024	Brisbane Lions	17	3	0	0	29	26	55	12	15	0.0	0.0	9.7	8.7	18.3	4.0	5.0	0
Career			194	86	87	2390	1704	4094	623	884	0.4	0.4	12.3	8.8	21.1	3.2	4.6	60

== Honours and achievements ==
- 2× Marcus Ashcroft Medal: 2021 (both games)
- J. J. Liston Trophy: 2023
