= List of AFL debuts in 2019 =

This is a list of players in the Australian Football League (AFL) who have either made their AFL debut or played for a new club during the 2019 AFL season. The season was notable in that Richmond's Marlion Pickett became the first player since 1952 to make his debut in an AFL Grand Final and the first since 1928 to win a premiership in his debut game.

== Summary ==
Summary of debuts in 2019
Club	AFL debuts	Change of club
Adelaide	2	1
Brisbane Lions	2	4
Carlton	4	6
Collingwood	2	1
Essendon	3	3
Fremantle	4	4
Geelong	5	2
Gold Coast	5	6
Greater Western Sydney	6	1
Hawthorn	3	3
Melbourne	7	4
North Melbourne	4	5
Port Adelaide	6	3
Richmond	7	2
St Kilda	5	4
Sydney	5	3
West Coast	3	2
Western Bulldogs	5	2
Total	78	56

== AFL debuts ==
Name	Club	Age at debut	Debut round	Games (in 2019)	Goals (in 2019)	Notes
Sam Walsh	Carlton	18 years, 262 days	1	22	6	Pick 1, 2018 national draft, Round 4 2019 AFL Rising Star nomination
Michael Gibbons	Carlton	23 years, 310 days	1	21	16	2018 pre-season supplemental selection
Noah Balta	Richmond	19 years, 149 days	1	13	6	Pick 25, 2017 national draft
Charlie Constable	Geelong	19 years, 308 days	1	7	5	Pick 36, 2017 national draft, Round 2 2019 AFL Rising Star nomination
Jordan Clark	Geelong	18 years, 157 days	1	18	11	Pick 15, 2018 national draft
Gryan Miers	Geelong	19 years, 357 days	1	25	28	Pick 57, 2017 national draft, Round 8 2019 AFL Rising Star nomination
Tom Atkins	Geelong	23 years, 185 days	1	23	5	Pick 11, 2019 rookie draft
Tom Sparrow	Melbourne	18 years, 296 days	1	2	1	Pick 27, 2018 national draft
Marty Hore	Melbourne	23 years, 18 days	1	14	1	Pick 56, 2018 national draft
Willem Drew	Port Adelaide	20 years, 173 days	1	10	2	Pick 33, 2016 national draft
Xavier Duursma	Port Adelaide	18 years, 259 days	1	20	11	Pick 18, 2018 national draft, Nephew of Jamie Duursma, Round 6 2019 AFL Rising Star nomination
Connor Rozee	Port Adelaide	19 years, 60 days	1	22	29	Pick 5, 2018 national draft, Round 3 2019 AFL Rising Star nomination
Zak Butters	Port Adelaide	18 years, 196 days	1	19	12	Pick 12, 2018 national draft
Chayce Jones	Adelaide	19 years, 68 days	1	8	3	Pick 9, 2018 national draft
Bailey Smith	Western Bulldogs	18 years, 106 days	1	23	11	Pick 7, 2018 national draft, Round 9 2019 AFL Rising Star nomination
Nick Blakey	Sydney	19 years, 24 days	1	21	19	Pick 10, 2018 national draft, Academy selection, son of John Blakey, Round 14 2019 AFL Rising Star nomination
Matthew Parker	St Kilda	23 years, 58 days	1	17	16	Pick 47, 2018 national draft
Callum Wilkie	St Kilda	23 years, 14 days	1	22	0	Pick 3, 2019 rookie draft
Jack Lukosius	Gold Coast	18 years, 227 days	1	21	3	Pick 2, 2018 national draft
Chris Burgess	Gold Coast	23 years, 118 days	1	14	4	2018 pre-draft selection
Lachie Schultz	Fremantle	21 years, 114 days	1	7	4	Pick 57, 2018 national draft
Bailey Scott	North Melbourne	18 years, 258 days	1	4	3	Pick 49, 2018 national draft, Father-son selection, son of Robert Scott, Round 1 2019 AFL Rising Star nomination
Jay Lockhart	Melbourne	23 years, 55 days	2	12	9	2018 pre-season supplemental selection
Tarryn Thomas	North Melbourne	19 years, 6 days	2	20	16	Pick 8, 2018 national draft, Next Generation Academy selection (Indigenous), Round 12 2019 AFL Rising Star nomination
Sydney Stack	Richmond	18 years, 343 days	3	17	10	2018 pre-season supplemental selection, Round 11 2019 AFL Rising Star nomination
Josh Rotham	West Coast	21 years, 40 days	3	4	0	Pick 37, 2016 national draft
Dylan Moore	Hawthorn	19 years, 246 days	3	7	2	Pick 67, 2017 national draft
Justin McInerney	Sydney	18 years, 236 days	4	1	0	Pick 44, 2018 national draft
Jack Ross	Richmond	18 years, 222 days	4	7	1	Pick 43, 2018 national draft
Brayden Ham	Essendon	19 years, 359 days	5	5	3	Pick 72, 2018 national draft
Jackson Hately	Greater Western Sydney	18 years, 181 days	5	7	2	Pick 14, 2018 national draft
James Rowbottom	Sydney	18 years, 213 days	5	12	4	Pick 25, 2018 national draft
Will Hayes	Western Bulldogs	23 years, 320 days	5	9	4	Pick 78, 2018 national draft
Lachie Young	Western Bulldogs	20 years, 15 days	5	6	0	Pick 6, 2019 rookie draft
Noah Answerth	Brisbane Lions	19 years, 264 days	6	19	2	Pick 55, 2018 national draft
Josh Corbett	Gold Coast	23 years, 4 days	6	9	3	2018 pre-draft selection
Declan Keilty	Melbourne	23 years, 361 days	7	2	0	Pick 41, 2017 rookie draft
Liam Stocker	Carlton	19 years, 102 days	7	5	0	Pick 19, 2018 national draft
Curtis Taylor	North Melbourne	19 years, 36 days	8	2	0	Pick 46, 2018 national draft
Oskar Baker	Melbourne	20 years, 357 days	9	9	2	Pick 48, 2017 national draft
Robbie Young	St Kilda	24 years, 77 days	9	3	2	Pick 67, 2018 national draft
Mitch Hinge	Brisbane Lions	20 years, 362 days	9	2	1	Pick 20, 2017 rookie draft
Darcy Fort	Geelong	25 years, 285 days	9	3	5	Pick 65, 2018 national draft
Joel Garner	Port Adelaide	19 years, 363 days	9	4	0	Pick 60, 2017 national draft
Ben King	Gold Coast	18 years, 316 days	9	14	17	Pick 6, 2018 national draft
Peter Ladhams	Port Adelaide	21 years, 131 days	10	5	2	Pick 9, 2017 rookie draft
Callum Coleman-Jones	Richmond	19 years, 346 days	10	1	0	Pick 20, 2017 national draft
Brett Bewley	Fremantle	24 years, 42 days	10	7	1	Pick 59, 2018 national draft
Ryan Gardner	Western Bulldogs	22 years, 1 day	11	2	2	Pick 6, 2019 mid-season draft
Patrick Naish	Richmond	20 years, 143 days	12	2	1	Pick 34, 2017 national draft, son of Chris Naish
Nick Hind	St Kilda	24 years, 300 days	13	11	11	Pick 54, 2018 national draft
Jake Stein	Greater Western Sydney	25 years, 150 days	13	5	0	2016 Category B rookie selection (athletics)
Jarrod Cameron	West Coast	19 years, 48 days	14	7	11	Pick 39, 2018 national draft, Next Generation Academy selection (Indigenous)
Ben Davis	Adelaide	22 years, 40 days	15	1	0	Pick 75, 2016 national draft
Oliver Hanrahan	Hawthorn	20 years, 306 days	15	9	7	Pick 14, 2017 rookie draft
Kyron Hayden	North Melbourne	20 years, 22 days	15	1	0	Pick 27, 2019 rookie draft
Isaac Quaynor	Collingwood	19 years, 171 days	16	4	0	Pick 13, 2018 national draft, Next Generation Academy selection (Ghanaian descent)
Derek Eggmolesse-Smith	Richmond	21 years, 63 days	16	2	0	2017 Category B rookie selections, Next Generation Academy selection (Indigenous)
Kyle Dunkley	Melbourne	19 years, 17 days	16	5	3	Pick 3, 2019 mid-season draft
John Noble	Collingwood	22 years, 109 days	17	5	0	Pick 14, 2019 mid-season draft
Bobby Hill	Greater Western Sydney	19 years, 155 days	17	8	7	Pick 24, 2018 national draft
Hayden McLean	Sydney	20 years, 181 days	18	4	0	2018 pre-season supplemental selection
Francis Watson	West Coast	23 years, 295 days	18	2	0	2016 Category B rookie selection (Indigenous)
Doulton Langlands	St Kilda	19 years, 357 days	18	3	2	Pick 8, 2018 rookie draft
Rhylee West	Western Bulldogs	19 years, 16 days	19	3	2	Pick 26, 2018 national draft, father–son selection (son of Scott West)
Connor Idun	Greater Western Sydney	19 years, 5 days	20	1	0	Pick 61, 2018 national draft (born in England)
Jason Carter	Fremantle	19 years, 204 days	20	2	0	2018 Category B rookie selections, Next Generation Academy selection (Indigenous)
Angus Schumacher	Carlton	20 years, 141 days	20	1	0	Pick 70, 2017 national draft
Changkuoth Jiath	Hawthorn	20 years, 57 days	21	2	0	2017 Category B rookie selections, Next Generation Academy selection (born in Ethiopia)
Jye Caldwell	Greater Western Sydney	18 years, 315 days	21	2	0	Pick 11, 2018 national draft
James Bell	Sydney	20 years, 181 days	21	2	1	2017 Category B rookie selections, NSW zone selection
Caleb Graham	Gold Coast	18 years, 332 days	21	3	0	Pick 71, 2018 national draft
Kade Chandler	Melbourne	19 years, 215 days	22	1	0	Pick 15, 2019 rookie draft
Brandon Zerk-Thatcher	Essendon	20 years, 357 days	22	1	0	Pick 66, 2017 national draft
Zach Sproule	Greater Western Sydney	21 years, 98 days	22	1	0	2016 Category B rookie selections, NSW zone selection
Tom Jok	Essendon	22 years, 234 days	23	1	0	Pick 8, 2019 rookie draft
Hugh Dixon	Fremantle	20 years, 180 days	23	1	1	Pick 44, 2017 national draft
Marlion Pickett	Richmond	27 years, 265 days	GF	1	1	Pick 13, 2019 mid-season draft

== Change of AFL club ==
Name	Club	Age at debut	Debut round	Games (in 2019)	Goals (in 2019)	Former clubs	Recruiting method
Alex Fasolo	Carlton	26 years, 286 days	1			Collingwood	2018 free agent
Mitch McGovern	Carlton	24 years, 161 days	1			Adelaide	2018 trade
Nic Newman	Carlton	26 years, 65 days	1			Sydney	2018 trade
Will Setterfield	Carlton	21 years, 44 days	1			Greater Western Sydney	2018 trade
Tom Lynch	Richmond	26 years, 141 days	1	25	63	Gold Coast	2018 free agent
Maverick Weller	Richmond	27 years, 36 days	1	2	1	Gold Coast, St Kilda	2018 pre-season supplemental selection
Jordan Roughead	Collingwood	28 years, 139 days	1	24	1	Western Bulldogs	2018 trade
Luke Dahlhaus	Geelong	26 years, 213 days	1	24		Western Bulldogs	2018 free agent
Gary Rohan	Geelong	27 years, 288 days	1	19		Sydney	2018 trade
Corey Wagner	Melbourne	22 years, days	1			North Melbourne	2018 pre-season supplemental selection
Ryan Burton	Port Adelaide	22 years, 51 days	1			Hawthorn	2018 trade
Scott Lycett	Port Adelaide	26 years, 178 days	1			West Coast	2018 free agent
Jack Scrimshaw	Hawthorn	20 years, 200 days	1			Gold Coast	2018 trade
Taylor Duryea	Western Bulldogs	27 years, 333 days	1			Hawthorn	2018 trade
Sam Lloyd	Western Bulldogs	29 years, 20 days	1			Richmond	2018 trade
Ryan Clarke	Sydney	21 years, 279 days	1			North Melbourne	2018 trade
Jarryd Lyons	Brisbane Lions	26 years, 244 days	1			Adelaide, Gold Coast	2018 free agent
Lincoln McCarthy	Brisbane Lions	25 years, 152 days	1			Geelong	2018 trade
Lachie Neale	Brisbane Lions	25 years, 303 days	1			Fremantle	2018 trade
Tom Hickey	West Coast	28 years, 17 days	1			St Kilda	2018 trade
Dean Kent	St Kilda	25 years, 28 days	1			Melbourne	2018 trade
Sam Collins	Gold Coast	24 years, 282 days	1			Fremantle	Pre-draft selection
Jack Hombsch	Gold Coast	26 years, 17 days	1			Greater Western Sydney, Port Adelaide	2018 trade
George Horlin-Smith	Gold Coast	26 years, 92 days	1			Geelong	2018 trade
Anthony Miles	Gold Coast	27 years, 24 days	1			Greater Western Sydney, Richmond	2018 trade
Jordan Murdoch	Gold Coast	27 years, 1 days	1			Geelong	2018 free agent
Dylan Shiel	Essendon	26 years, 15 days	1			Greater Western Sydney	2018 trade
Travis Colyer	Fremantle	27 years, 212 days	1			Essendon	2018 trade
Reece Conca	Fremantle	26 years, 224 days	1			Richmond	2018 free agent
Rory Lobb	Fremantle	26 years, 43 days	1			Greater Western Sydney	2018 trade
Aaron Hall	North Melbourne	28 years, 135 days	1			Gold Coast	2018 trade
Jasper Pittard	North Melbourne	27 years, 357 days	1			Port Adelaide	2018 trade
Jared Polec	North Melbourne	26 years, 163 days	1			Brisbane Lions, Port Adelaide	2018 trade
Dom Tyson	North Melbourne	25 years, 289 days	1			Greater Western Sydney, Melbourne	2018 trade
Josh Smith	West Coast	25 years, 87 days	2			Collingwood	Pick 34, 2019 rookie draft
Steven May	Melbourne	26 years, 43 days	2			Gold Coast	2018 trade
Kade Kolodjashnij	Melbourne	23 years, 233 days	2			Gold Coast	2018 trade
Tom Campbell	North Melbourne	27 years, 149 days	2			Western Bulldogs	2018 pre-season supplemental selection
Tom Scully	Hawthorn	27 years, 320 days	2			Melbourne, Greater Western Sydney	2018 trade
Jesse Hogan	Fremantle	24 years, 47 days	2			Melbourne	2018 trade
Zac Clarke	Essendon	29 years, 8 days	3			Fremantle	2018 pre-season supplemental selection
Jackson Thurlow	Sydney	25 years, 9 days	3			Geelong	2018 trade
Tom Sheridan	Greater Western Sydney	25 years, 160 days	3			Fremantle	2018 free agent
Chad Wingard	Hawthorn	25 years, 252 days	3			Port Adelaide	2018 trade
Braydon Preuss	Melbourne	23 years, 299 days	4			North Melbourne	2018 trade
Jonathon Marsh	St Kilda	23 years, 199 days	7			Collingwood	2018 pre-season supplemental selection
Daniel Menzel	Sydney	27 years, 261 days	11			Geelong	2018 free agent
Corey Ellis	Gold Coast	22 years, 249 days	13			Richmond	2018 trade
Dan Hannebery	St Kilda	28 years, 118 days	14			Sydney	2018 trade
Marcus Adams	Brisbane Lions	26 years, 7 days	16			Western Bulldogs	2018 trade
Hugh Goddard	Carlton	22 years, 323 days	17			St Kilda	Pick 1, 2019 rookie draft
Tyson Stengle	Adelaide	20 years, 267 days	17			Richmond	2018 trade
Cam Sutcliffe	Port Adelaide	27 years, 52 days	16			Fremantle	Pick 9, 2019 mid-season draft
Will Snelling	Essendon	21 years, 347 days	17			Port Adelaide	Pick 7, 2019 mid-season draft
Josh Deluca	Carlton	23 years, 70 days	16			Fremantle	Pick 1, 2019 mid-season draft
Sam Rowe	St Kilda	31 years, 278 days	23			Carlton	2018 pre-season supplemental selection

== See also ==
- List of AFL Women's debuts in 2019
