= 2018 AFL draft =

Draft for the Australian Football League

General information
- Dates: 22 November - First Round; 23 November - Second Round to completion, Pre-season Draft (if held), Rookie Draft
- Location: Marvel Stadium, Melbourne, Victoria
- Network: Fox Footy
- Sponsored by: National Australia Bank

Overview
- League: AFL
- First selection: Sam Walsh (Carlton)

The 2018 AFL draft consisted of the various periods where the 18 clubs in the Australian Football League (AFL) traded and recruited players following the completion of the 2018 AFL season.

For the first time, the AFL draft featured live trading of picks and was held over two days, with the first round held on the evening of Thursday, 22 November and the remainder of the draft being held on Friday, 23 November The draft was held in Victoria for the first time since 2009.

== Key dates ==
Table of key dates
Event	Date(s)
Free agency period	5–12 October (restricted and unrestricted); 1–8 November, 10–16 November, 23 November (delisted)
Trade period	8–17 October (players and selections); 18 October–16 November (selections only)
National draft	22 November (first round); 23 November (second and subsequent rounds)
Rookie draft	23 November
Pre-season supplemental selection period	1 December-15 March

== Player movements ==
=== Previous trades ===
Since 2015, clubs have been able to trade future picks in the next year's national draft during the trade period. As a result, a total of 29 selections for the 2018 draft were traded during the 2017 trade period, and the selection order for each of these picks is tied to the original club's finishing position in the 2018 season.

Table of previously traded selections
Rd	Orig. Club	New Club	Acquired via	Ref
1	Melbourne	Adelaide	Jake Lever trade	
1	West Coast	Gold Coast	Pick swap	
2	Carlton	Adelaide	Bryce Gibbs trade	
2	Adelaide	Carlton	Bryce Gibbs trade	
2	Gold Coast	West Coast	Pick swap	
2	St Kilda	Port Adelaide	Pick swap	
2	Fremantle	Greater Western Sydney	Nathan Wilson trade	
2	Western Bulldogs	Carlton	Pick swap	
2	Essendon	Gold Coast	Adam Saad trade	
2	Geelong	Gold Coast	Gary Ablett trade	
2	Greater Western Sydney	Essendon	Devon Smith trade	
2	Collingwood	Sydney	Sam Murray trade	
3	Carlton	Adelaide	Bryce Gibbs trade	
3	St Kilda	North Melbourne	via Port Adelaide (Logan Austin trade) on-traded to North Melbourne (pick swap)	
3	Fremantle	Gold Coast	Brandon Matera trade	
3	Adelaide	Melbourne	Jake Lever trade	
3	Essendon	Greater Western Sydney	Devon Smith trade	
3	North Melbourne	Port Adelaide	Pick swap	
3	Sydney	Collingwood	Sam Murray trade	
3	Richmond	Geelong	Pick swap	
3	West Coast	North Melbourne	via Port Adelaide (Brendon Ah Chee trade) on-traded to North Melbourne (pick swap)	
4	Carlton	Geelong	Darcy Lang trade	
4	Geelong	Carlton	Darcy Lang trade	
4	Gold Coast	Geelong	Gary Ablett trade	
4	Fremantle	Western Bulldogs	Hayden Crozier trade	
4	Adelaide	St Kilda	via Gold Coast (Harrison Wigg trade) on-traded to Port Adelaide (Aaron Young trade) on-traded to St Kilda (pick swap)	
4	Port Adelaide	St Kilda	Logan Austin trade	
4	Hawthorn	West Coast	via Port Adelaide (Jarman Impey trade) on-traded to West Coast (Brendon Ah Chee trade)	
4	Melbourne	Adelaide	Jake Lever trade	

=== Free agency ===
2018 AFL free agency period signings
Player	Date	Free agent type	Former club	New club	Compensation	Ref
Reece Conca	5 October	Unrestricted	Richmond	Fremantle	None ^{[a]}	
Luke Dahlhaus	5 October	Unrestricted	Western Bulldogs	Geelong	2nd round	
Tom Lynch	8 October	Restricted	Gold Coast	Richmond	1st round	
Scott Lycett	9 October	Restricted	West Coast	Port Adelaide	End of 1st round	
Alex Fasolo	10 October	Unrestricted	Collingwood	Carlton	3rd round	
Jarryd Lyons	1 November	Delisted	Gold Coast	Brisbane Lions	None	
Tom Sheridan	1 November	Delisted	Fremantle	Greater Western Sydney	None	
Darren Minchington	1 November	Delisted	St Kilda	Hawthorn	None	
Jordan Murdoch	7 November	Delisted	Geelong	Gold Coast	None	
Daniel Menzel	14 November	Delisted	Geelong	Sydney	None	

- ^{a} Richmond received an end of second round compensation pick for Reece Conca, however this pick was withdrawn due to Tom Lynch signing with them

=== Trades ===
2018 AFL trade period
Date	No.	Player(s)	Traded from	Traded to	Traded for	Ref
8 October	1	Lincoln McCarthy	Geelong	Brisbane Lions	Pick 43	
8 October	1	Pick 55	Geelong	Brisbane Lions	Pick 62	
8 October	1	Pick 59	Geelong	Brisbane Lions	Pick 62	
8 October	2	Anthony Miles	Richmond	Gold Coast	2019 third-round pick (Gold Coast)	
8 October	2	Corey Ellis	Richmond	Gold Coast	2019 third-round pick (Gold Coast)	
8 October	2	2019 third-round pick (Richmond)	Richmond	Gold Coast	2019 third-round pick (Gold Coast)	
8 October	3	Nathan Kreuger (South Adelaide)	Carlton	Geelong	Pick 43	
10 October	4	Pick 24	Brisbane Lions	Gold Coast	Pick 32	
10 October	4	Pick 24	Brisbane Lions	Gold Coast	Pick 41	
10 October	4	Pick 59	Brisbane Lions	Gold Coast	Pick 44	
10 October	4	Pick 80	Brisbane Lions	Gold Coast	Pick 78	
10 October	5	Mitch McGovern	Adelaide	Carlton	Shane McAdam (Sturt)	
10 October	5	2019 third-round pick (Adelaide)	Adelaide	Carlton	2019 fifth-round pick (Carlton)	
10 October	5	Pick 13	Sydney	Carlton	Pick 26	
10 October	5	Pick 13	Sydney	Carlton	Pick 28	
10 October	5	Pick 13	Sydney	Adelaide	Pick 40	
10 October	6	Jared Polec	Port Adelaide	North Melbourne	Pick 11	
10 October	6	Jasper Pittard	Port Adelaide	North Melbourne	Pick 11	
10 October	6	Pick 48	Port Adelaide	North Melbourne	2019 fourth-round pick (North Melbourne)	
10 October	7	Gary Rohan	Sydney	Geelong	Pick 62	
10 October	8	Ryan Clarke	North Melbourne	Sydney	Pick 62	
10 October	9	Tom Hickey	St Kilda	West Coast	Pick 39	
10 October	9	Pick 61	St Kilda	West Coast	Pick 39	
10 October	9	2019 fourth-round pick (St Kilda)	St Kilda	West Coast	2019 fourth-round pick (West Coast)	
11 October	10	Pick 6	Fremantle	Port Adelaide	Pick 11	
11 October	10	Pick 6	Fremantle	Port Adelaide	Pick 23	
11 October	10	2019 third-round pick (Fremantle)	Fremantle	Port Adelaide	Pick 30	
11 October	10	2019 third-round pick (Fremantle)	Fremantle	Port Adelaide	Pick 49	
12 October	11	Dan Hannebery	Sydney	St Kilda	Pick 39	
12 October	11	Pick 28	Sydney	St Kilda	2019 second-round pick (St Kilda)	
12 October	12	Dean Kent	Melbourne	St Kilda	Pick 65	
12 October	13	Dom Tyson	Melbourne	North Melbourne	Braydon Preuss	
12 October	13	Dom Tyson	Melbourne	North Melbourne	Pick 62	
12 October	14	Will Setterfield	Greater Western Sydney	Carlton	Pick 43	
12 October	14	Pick 71	Greater Western Sydney	Carlton	2019 second-round pick (Carlton)	
15 October	15	Sam Lloyd	Richmond	Western Bulldogs	Pick 64	
16 October	16	Aaron Hall	Gold Coast	North Melbourne	Pick 68	
16 October	17	Jack Scrimshaw	Gold Coast	Hawthorn	2019 third-round pick (Hawthorn)	
16 October	17	2019 fourth-round pick (Gold Coast)	Gold Coast	Hawthorn	2019 third-round pick (Hawthorn)	
16 October	18	Pick 68	Gold Coast	Adelaide	2019 fourth-round pick (Adelaide)	
16 October	19	George Horlin-Smith	Geelong	Gold Coast	Pick 59	
16 October	20	Tyson Stengle	Richmond	Adelaide	Pick 68	
16 October	21	Tom Scully	Greater Western Sydney	Hawthorn	2019 fourth-round pick (Gold Coast)	
16 October	22	Taylor Duryea	Hawthorn	Western Bulldogs	2019 fourth-round pick (Western Bulldogs)	
17 October	23	Chad Wingard	Port Adelaide	Hawthorn	Ryan Burton	
17 October	23	Chad Wingard	Port Adelaide	Hawthorn	Pick 15	
17 October	23	2019 third-round pick (Port Adelaide)	Port Adelaide	Hawthorn	Pick 35	
17 October	23	2019 third-round pick (Port Adelaide)	Port Adelaide	Hawthorn	2019 fourth-round pick (Western Bulldogs)	
17 October	24	Sam Mayes	Brisbane Lions	Port Adelaide	Pick 6	
17 October	24	Sam Mayes	Brisbane Lions	Port Adelaide	Pick 35	
17 October	24	Pick 5	Brisbane Lions	Port Adelaide	2019 third-round pick (Fremantle)	
17 October	25	2019 first-round pick (Brisbane Lions)	Brisbane Lions	Gold Coast	Pick 19	
17 October	25	2019 first-round pick (Brisbane Lions)	Brisbane Lions	Gold Coast	2019 second-round pick (Gold Coast)	
17 October	25	2019 first-round pick (Brisbane Lions)	Brisbane Lions	Gold Coast	2019 third-round pick (Hawthorn)	
17 October	26	Lachie Neale	Fremantle	Brisbane Lions	Pick 6	
17 October	26	Lachie Neale	Fremantle	Brisbane Lions	Pick 19	
17 October	26	Pick 30	Fremantle	Brisbane Lions	Pick 55	
17 October	27	Jesse Hogan	Melbourne	Fremantle	Pick 6	
17 October	27	Pick 65	Melbourne	Fremantle	Pick 23	
17 October	28	Rory Lobb	Greater Western Sydney	Fremantle	Pick 11	
17 October	28	Pick 14	Greater Western Sydney	Fremantle	Pick 11	
17 October	28	Pick 43	Greater Western Sydney	Fremantle	Pick 19	
17 October	28	Pick 47	Greater Western Sydney	Fremantle	Pick 19	
17 October	29	Pick 31	North Melbourne	Fremantle	Pick 47	
17 October	29	Pick 31	North Melbourne	Fremantle	Pick 49	
17 October	29	Pick 31	North Melbourne	Fremantle	Pick 55	
17 October	30	Steven May	Gold Coast	Melbourne	Pick 6	
17 October	30	Kade Kolodjashnij	Gold Coast	Melbourne	Pick 6	
17 October	31	Jack Hombsch	Port Adelaide	Gold Coast	2019 fourth-round pick (Adelaide)	
17 October	32	Jackson Thurlow	Geelong	Sydney	Pick 70	
17 October	33	Pick 28	St Kilda	Melbourne	Pick 36	
17 October	33	Pick 28	St Kilda	Melbourne	Pick 46	
17 October	34	Marcus Adams	Western Bulldogs	Brisbane Lions	Pick 32	
17 October	34	Marcus Adams	Western Bulldogs	Brisbane Lions	2019 third-round pick (Hawthorn)	
17 October	35	Jordan Roughead	Western Bulldogs	Collingwood	Pick 75	
17 October	36	Travis Colyer	Essendon	Fremantle	2019 fourth-round pick (Fremantle)	
17 October	37	Dylan Shiel	Greater Western Sydney	Essendon	Pick 9	
17 October	37	2019 second-round pick (GWS)	Greater Western Sydney	Essendon	2019 first-round pick (Essendon)	
17 October	38	Nic Newman	Sydney	Carlton	2019 fourth-round pick (Carlton)	
17 October	39	Dayne Beams	Brisbane Lions	Collingwood	Pick 18	
17 October	39	Pick 41	Brisbane Lions	Collingwood	Pick 56	
17 October	39	Pick 44	Brisbane Lions	Collingwood	2019 first-round pick (Collingwood)	
26 October	40	Pick 59	Geelong	Collingwood	Pick 51	
26 October	40	Pick 60	Geelong	Collingwood	Pick 51	
22 November (1st Round)	41	Pick 26	Sydney	West Coast	2019 third-round pick (West Coast)	
22 November (1st Round)	42	Pick 24	West Coast	Sydney	2019 second-round pick (Sydney)	
22 November (1st Round)	43	Pick 19	Adelaide	Carlton	2019 first-round pick (Carlton)	
22 November (1st Round)	43	2019 first-round pick (Adelaide)	Adelaide	Carlton	2019 first-round pick (Carlton)	
23 November (2nd Round onwards)	44	Pick 23	West Coast	Gold Coast	Pick 27	
23 November (2nd Round onwards)	44	2019 fifth-round pick (West Coast)	West Coast	Gold Coast	Pick 32	
23 November (2nd Round onwards)	45	Pick 24	Adelaide	Greater Western Sydney	Pick 28	
23 November (2nd Round onwards)	45	2019 fifth-round pick (Adelaide)	Adelaide	Greater Western Sydney	2019 second-round pick (Carlton)	
23 November (2nd Round onwards)	46	Pick 34	Fremantle	Western Bulldogs	Pick 30	
23 November (2nd Round onwards)	46	Pick 41	Fremantle	Western Bulldogs	Pick 57	
23 November (2nd Round onwards)	47	Pick 51	North Melbourne	St Kilda	2019 third-round pick (St Kilda)	
23 November (2nd Round onwards)	48	Pick 46	Western Bulldogs	North Melbourne	2019 third-round pick (North Melbourne)	
23 November (2nd Round onwards)	49	Pick 54	North Melbourne	Brisbane Lions	2019 fourth-round pick (Brisbane Lions)	
23 November (2nd Round onwards)	50	Pick 61	St Kilda	Greater Western Sydney	2019 fourth-round pick (Gold Coast)	
23 November (2nd Round onwards)	50	Pick 61	St Kilda	Greater Western Sydney	2019 fourth-round pick (GWS)	
23 November (2nd Round onwards)	51	Pick 64	Carlton	Adelaide	Pick 67	
23 November (2nd Round onwards)	51	Pick 64	Carlton	Adelaide	2019 fifth-round pick (Carlton)	
23 November (2nd Round onwards)	52	Pick 63	Collingwood	Hawthorn	2019 fourth-round pick (Hawthorn)	
23 November (2nd Round onwards)	52	2019 fifth-round pick (Collingwood)	Collingwood	Hawthorn	2019 fourth-round pick (Hawthorn)	
23 November (2nd Round onwards)	53	Pick 75	St Kilda	Carlton	Pick 67	
23 November (2nd Round onwards)	53	2019 fourth-round pick (West Coast)	St Kilda	Carlton	Pick 67	
23 November (2nd Round onwards)	54	Pick 68	Richmond	Geelong	2019 fourth-round pick (Geelong)	

== Retirements and delistings ==
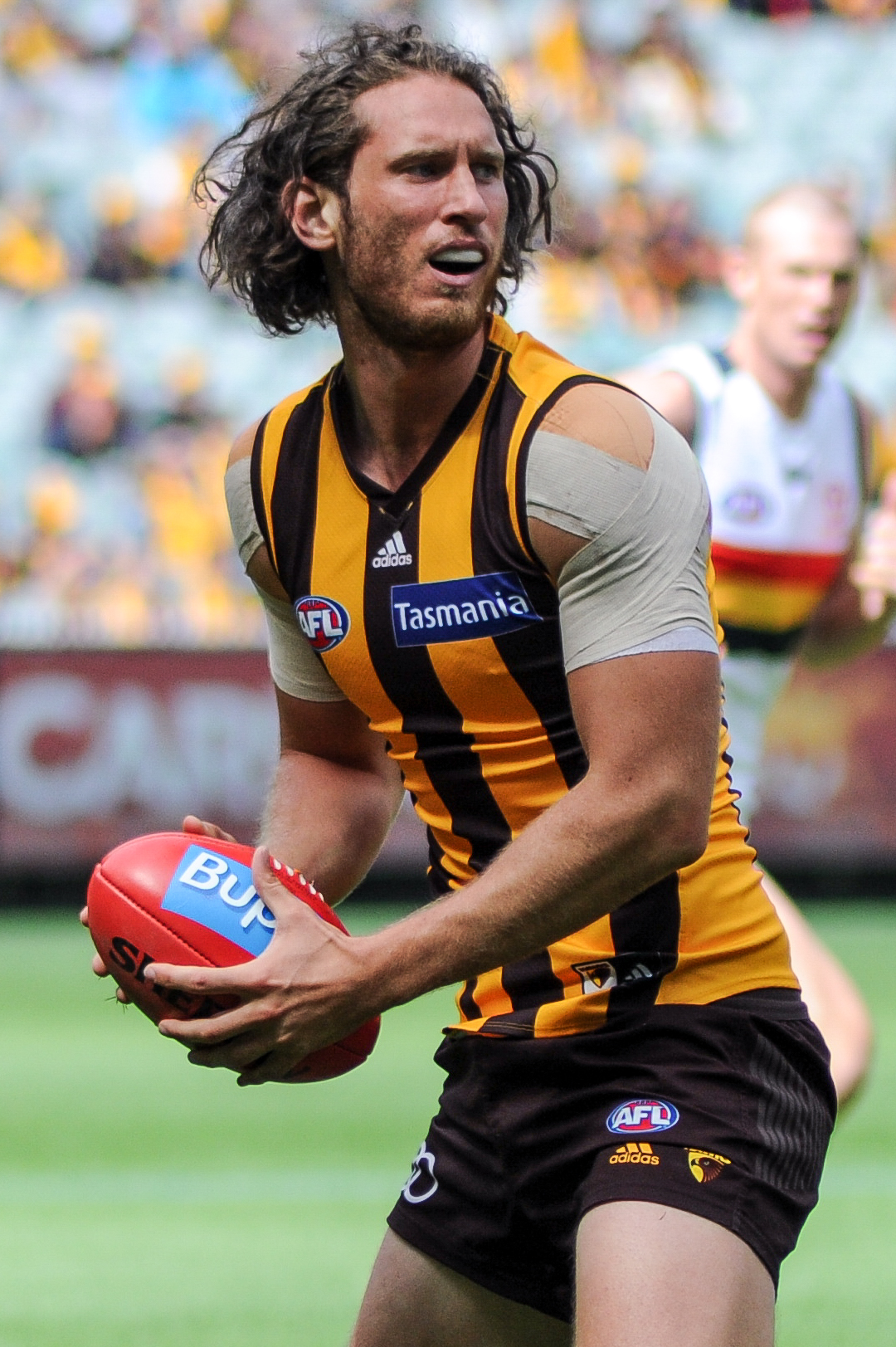
Ty Vickery retired prior to the start of the season after playing 125 games for Richmond and Hawthorn.

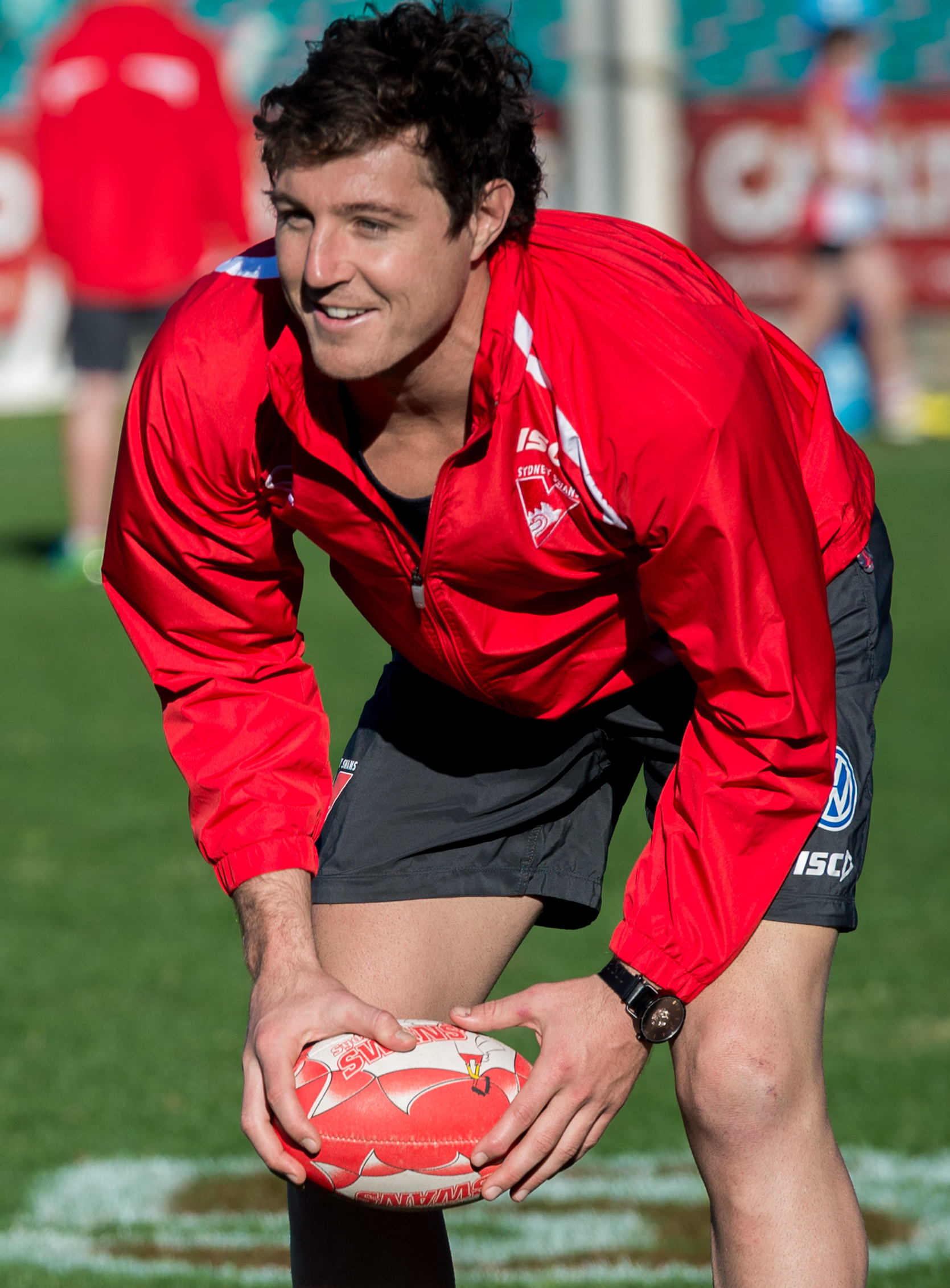
Kurt Tippett retired prior to the start of the season after playing 178 games for Adelaide and Sydney.

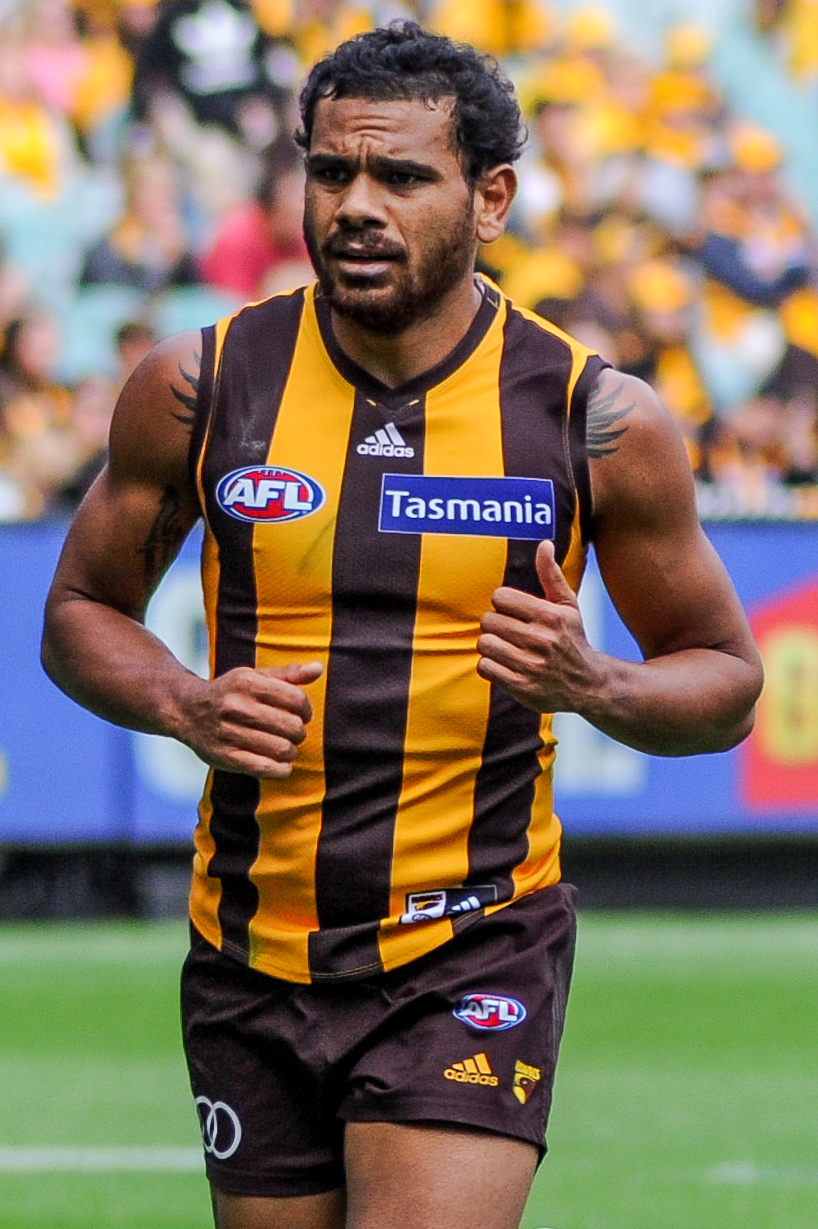
Cyril Rioli retired in July after playing 189 games for Hawthorn.

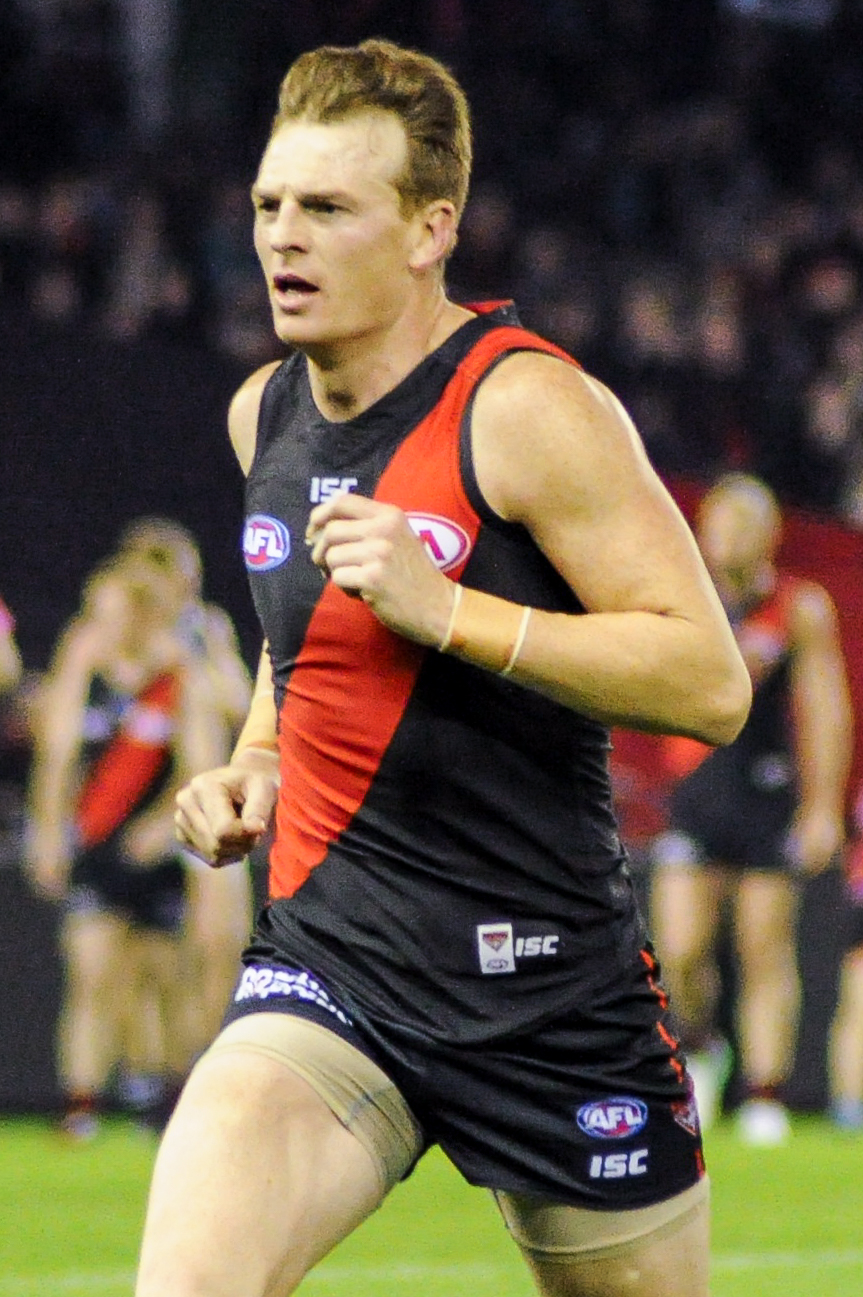
Brendon Goddard was delisted by Essendon at the end of the season, after playing 334 games for St Kilda and Essendon.

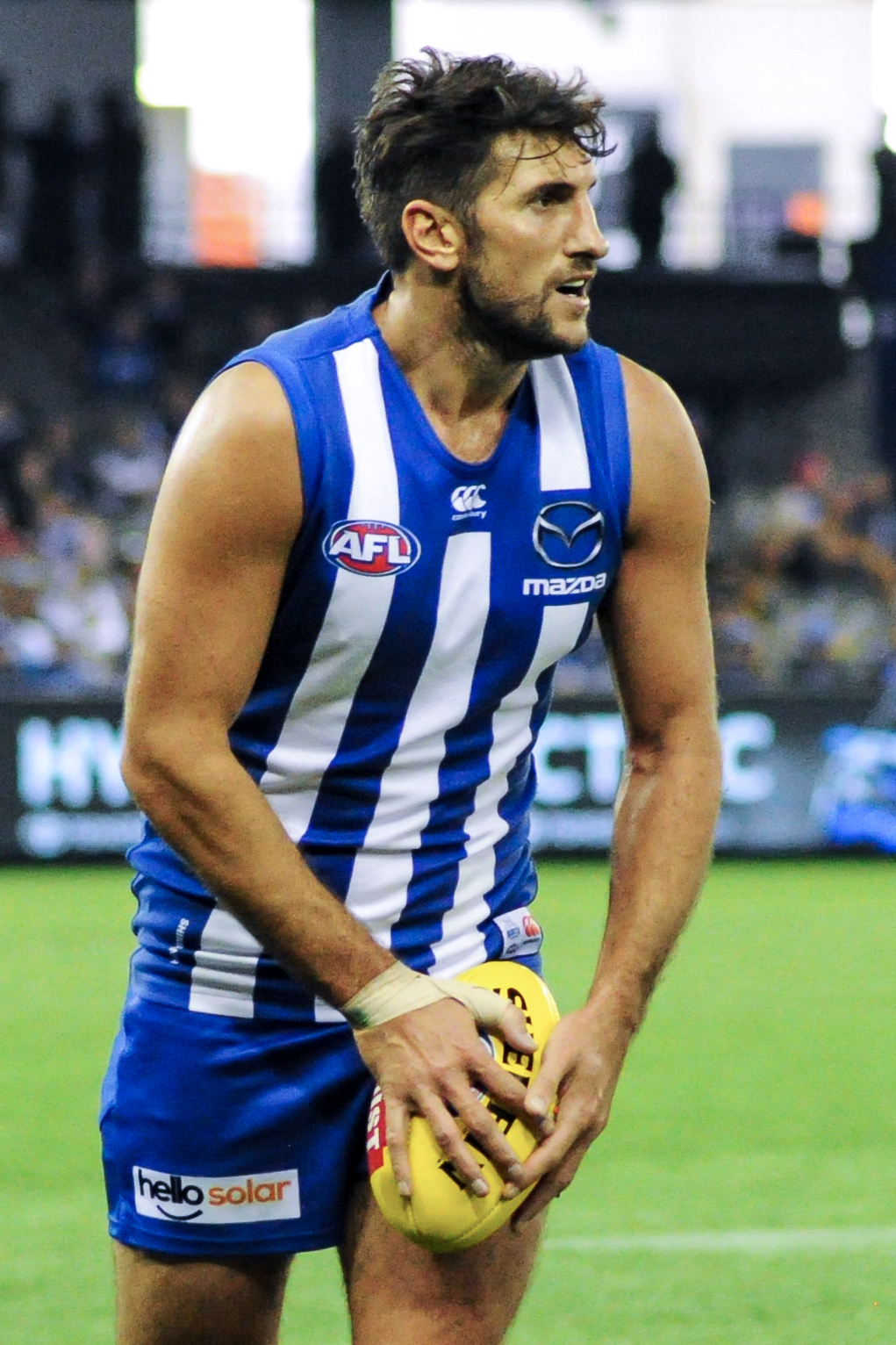
Jarrad Waite retired at the end of the season after playing 244 games for Carlton and North Melbourne.

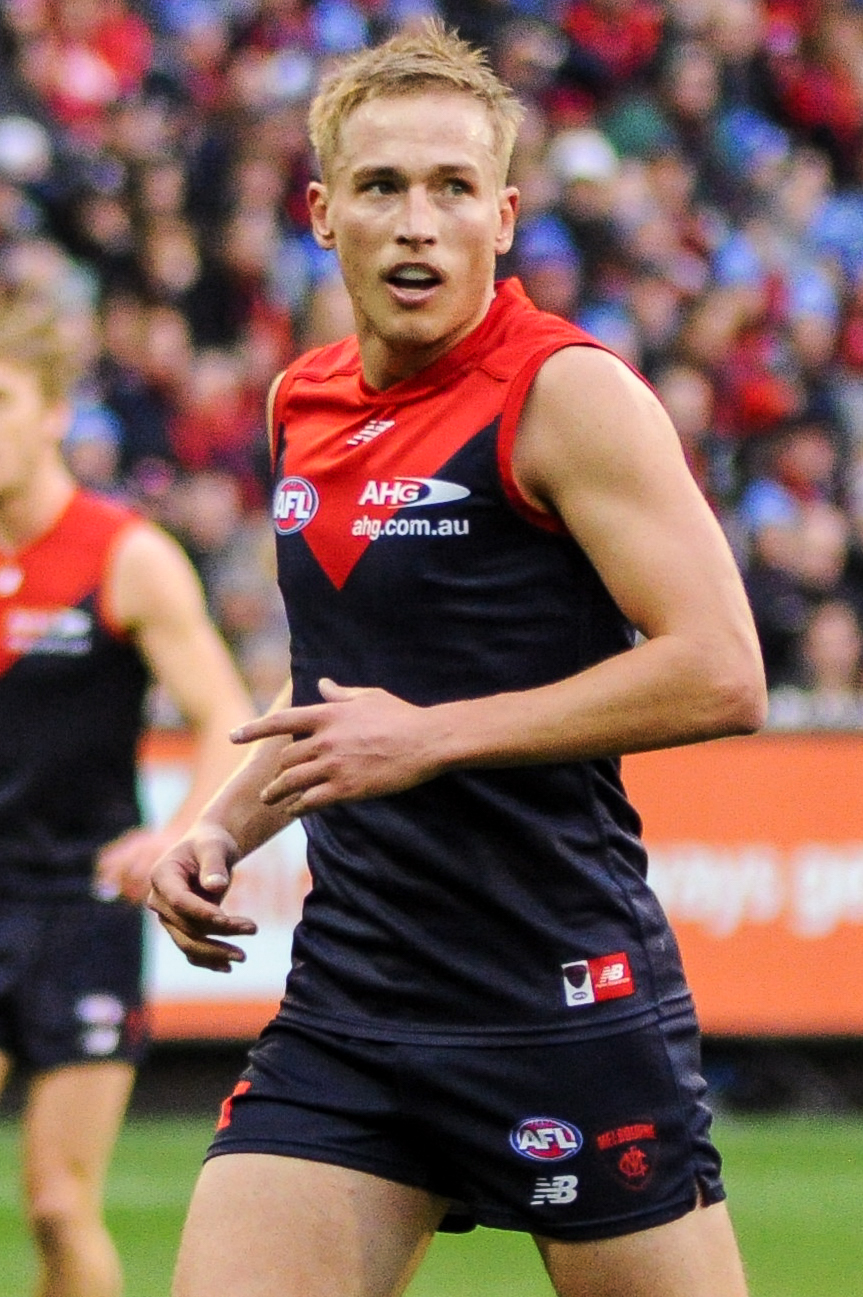
Bernie Vince retired at the end of the season after playing 229 for Adelaide and Melbourne.

Table key
†	Retired, effective immediately
‡	Retired, effective at the end of the season
R	Rookie listed player
B	Category B Rookie listed player

Table of player retirements and delistings
Date	Name	Club	Status	Ref
15 November	Ty Vickery	Hawthorn	Retired †	
11 January	Ben Griffiths	Richmond	Retired †	
22 January	Kurt Tippett	Sydney	Retired †	
9 February	Cian Hanley	Brisbane Lions	Retired † B	
26 June	Shaun Hampson	Richmond	Retired †	
4 July	Cyril Rioli	Hawthorn	Retired †	
9 July	Clay Smith	Western Bulldogs	Retired †	
18 July	Curtly Hampton	Adelaide	Retired †	
23 July	Koby Stevens	St Kilda	Retired †	
2 August	Harley Balic	Melbourne	Retired †	
7 August	Matt Rosa	Gold Coast	Retired †	
7 August	Sam Gibson	Adelaide	Retired ‡	
8 August	Lee Spurr	Fremantle	Retired †	
21 August	Brendon Goddard	Essendon	Delisted	
21 August	Jarrad Waite	North Melbourne	Retired ‡	
21 August	Alex Silvagni	Carlton	Retired † R	
22 August	Jackson Merrett	Essendon	Delisted	
23 August	Shane Biggs	Western Bulldogs	Retired †	
24 August	Danyle Pearce	Fremantle	Retired †	
24 August	Michael Johnson	Fremantle	Retired ‡	
25 August	Lindsay Thomas	Port Adelaide	Retired R	
26 August	Ray Connellan	St Kilda	Delisted B	
28 August	Kieran Collins	Western Bulldogs	Delisted	
28 August	Nathan Mullenger-McHugh	Western Bulldogs	Delisted R	
28 August	Jimmy Toumpas	Port Adelaide	Delisted	
28 August	Emmanuel Irra	Port Adelaide	Delisted B	
28 August	Billy Hartung	North Melbourne	Delisted	
28 August	Daniel Nielson	North Melbourne	Delisted	
28 August	Josh Williams	North Melbourne	Delisted	
28 August	Oscar Junker	North Melbourne	Delisted R	
28 August	Gordon Narrier	North Melbourne	Delisted R	
28 August	Tom Jeffries	North Melbourne	Delisted B	
28 August	Michael Barlow	Gold Coast	Delisted	
28 August	Josh Jaska	Gold Coast	Delisted R	
28 August	Max Spencer	Gold Coast	Delisted B	
28 August	Mackenzie Willis	Gold Coast	Delisted R	
28 August	Harry Dear	Adelaide	Delisted	
28 August	Jackson Edwards	Adelaide	Delisted R	
28 August	Ben Jarman	Adelaide	Delisted R	
28 August	Nathan Freeman	St Kilda	Delisted	
29 August	Hugh Goddard	St Kilda	Delisted	
29 August	Nathan Wright	St Kilda	Delisted	
30 August	Bernie Vince	Melbourne	Retired ‡	
30 August	Cam O'Shea	Carlton	Delisted	
30 August	Aaron Mullett	Carlton	Delisted	
30 August	Matt Shaw	Carlton	Delisted R	
30 August	Jesse Glass-McCasker	Carlton	Delisted R	
30 August	Michael Rischitelli	Gold Coast	Delisted	
4 September	Mitchell Hibberd	North Melbourne	Delisted	
5 September	Sam Gilbert	St Kilda	Delisted	
6 September	Darren Minchington	St Kilda	Delisted	
6 September	Rohan Bewick	Brisbane Lions	Delisted	
6 September	Tom Bell	Brisbane Lions	Delisted	
6 September	Marco Paparone	Brisbane Lions	Delisted	
6 September	Claye Beams	Brisbane Lions	Delisted R	
6 September	Jake Barrett	Brisbane Lions	Delisted R	
10 September	Liam Dawson	Brisbane Lions	Delisted	
10 September	Josh Green	Essendon	Delisted	
10 September	Aaron Black	Geelong	Delisted	
11 September	Cory Gregson	Geelong	Delisted	
11 September	Ryan Gardner	Geelong	Delisted	
11 September	Timm House	Geelong	Delisted	
11 September	Stewart Crameri	Geelong	Delisted R	
11 September	Matthew Hayball	Geelong	Delisted R	
12 September	Eric Mackenzie	West Coast	Retired	
14 September	Alex Johnson	Sydney	Delisted R	
16 September	Ryan Griffen	Greater Western Sydney	Retired	
17 September	Jack Redpath	Western Bulldogs	Retired	
25 September	Matthew Wright	Carlton	Retired	
25 September	Cameron Pedersen	Melbourne	Delisted	
25 September	Tomas Bugg	Melbourne	Delisted	
25 September	Mitch King	Melbourne	Delisted	
25 September	Pat McKenna	Melbourne	Delisted	
25 September	Lachlan Filipovic	Melbourne	Delisted R	
26 September	Jonathan O'Rourke	Hawthorn	Delisted	
26 September	Kurt Heatherley	Hawthorn	Delisted	
26 September	Dallas Willsmore	Hawthorn	Delisted R	
2 October	Dean Towers	Sydney	Delisted	
2 October	Jordan Foote	Sydney	Delisted	
2 October	Angus Styles	Sydney	Delisted R	
2 October	Jake Brown	Sydney	Delisted B	
4 October	Dion Johnstone	Melbourne	Delisted	
4 October	Declan Mountford	North Melbourne	Delisted	
15 October	Ciarán Byrne	Carlton	Retired	
15 October	Cillian McDaid	Carlton	Retired B	
17 October	Maverick Weller	St Kilda	Delisted	
18 October	Mark LeCras	West Coast	Retired	
18 October	Sam Rowe	Carlton	Delisted	
18 October	Jed Lamb	Carlton	Delisted	
18 October	Sam Kerridge	Carlton	Delisted	
18 October	Nick Graham	Carlton	Delisted	
22 October	Tom Sheridan	Fremantle	Delisted	
22 October	Cam Sutcliffe	Fremantle	Delisted	
22 October	Brady Grey	Fremantle	Delisted	
22 October	Luke Strnadica	Fremantle	Delisted R	
22 October	Malcolm Karpany	West Coast	Delisted	
22 October	Luke Partington	West Coast	Delisted	
22 October	Ryan Burrows	West Coast	Delisted R	
22 October	Callan England	West Coast	Delisted R	
22 October	Tony Olango	West Coast	Delisted R	
22 October	Tarir Bayok	West Coast	Delisted B	
22 October	Matthew Signorello	Adelaide	Delisted	
22 October	Jake Neade	Port Adelaide	Delisted	
22 October	Dom Barry	Port Adelaide	Delisted	
22 October	Will Snelling	Port Adelaide	Delisted R	
24 October	Dan Robinson	Sydney	Delisted	
24 October	Harrison Marsh	Sydney	Delisted	
24 October	Matthew Leuenberger	Essendon	Retired	
24 October	Daniel Menzel	Geelong	Delisted	
24 October	Jordan Murdoch	Geelong	Delisted	
25 October	Alex Morgan	North Melbourne	Delisted	
25 October	Tom Campbell	Western Bulldogs	Delisted	
25 October	Mitch Honeychurch	Western Bulldogs	Delisted	
26 October	Tim Mohr	Greater Western Sydney	Delisted	
26 October	Lachlan Tiziani	Greater Western Sydney	Delisted	
29 October	Brendan Whitecross	Hawthorn	Delisted	
29 October	Kieran Lovell	Hawthorn	Delisted	
30 October	Kyle Cheney	Adelaide	Delisted	
30 October	Paul Hunter	Adelaide	Delisted R	
30 October	Jesse Lonergan	Gold Coast	Delisted	
30 October	Harrison Wigg	Gold Coast	Delisted	
30 October	Brad Scheer	Gold Coast	Delisted	
30 October	Cameron Hewett	Port Adelaide	Delisted R	
30 October	Jarryd Blair	Collingwood	Delisted	
30 October	Tim Broomhead	Collingwood	Delisted	
30 October	Kayle Kirby	Collingwood	Retired	
30 October	Sam McLarty	Collingwood	Delisted	
30 October	Sam Murray	Collingwood	Delisted	
30 October	Adam Oxley	Collingwood	Delisted R	
30 October	Josh Smith	Collingwood	Delisted	
30 October	Will Langford	Hawthorn	Retired	
31 October	Jacob Townsend	Richmond	Delisted	
31 October	Nathan Drummond	Richmond	Delisted	
31 October	Mabior Chol	Richmond	Delisted R	
31 October	Jack Leslie	Gold Coast	Delisted	
31 October	Jarryd Lyons	Gold Coast	Delisted	
31 October	Matt Dea	Essendon	Delisted	
31 October	Jack Frost	Brisbane Lions	Retired	
31 October	Ethan Hughes	Fremantle	Delisted	
31 October	Ryan Nyhuis	Fremantle	Delisted R	
9 November	Jacob Allison	Brisbane Lions	Delisted	
9 November	Ryan Bastinac	Brisbane Lions	Delisted	
12 November	Kyron Hayden	North Melbourne	Delisted	
21 November	Michael Apeness	Fremantle	Retired	

== Pre-draft selections ==
Prior to the draft, the two bottom teams Carlton and Gold Coast applied for Priority Picks in the National Draft, which the AFL denied. However, Gold Coast were granted pre-draft access to up to three and Carlton up to two mature-aged State League players each, these selections could be traded to other clubs.

Table of pre-draft selections
Player	Club	Recruited from		Notes	Ref.
Player	Club	Club	League	Notes	Ref.
Nathan Kreuger	Carlton	South Adelaide	SANFL	Traded to Geelong for Pick 43	
Shane McAdam	Carlton	Sturt	SANFL	Traded to Adelaide as part of Mitch McGovern trade	
Josh Corbett	Gold Coast	Werribee	VFL		
Chris Burgess	Gold Coast	West Adelaide	SANFL		
Sam Collins	Gold Coast	Werribee	VFL		

== 2018 national draft ==
Indicative draft order as of 21 November 2018

^	Denotes player who has been inducted to the Australian Football Hall of Fame
*	Denotes player who has been a premiership player and been selected for at least one All-Australian team
^{+}	Denotes player who has been a premiership player at least once
^{x}	Denotes player who has been selected for at least one All-Australian team
^{#}	Denotes player who has never played in a VFL/AFL home and away season or finals game
^{~}	Denotes player who has been selected as Rising Star

Table of national draft selections
Round	Pick	Player	Club	Recruited from		Notes
Round	Pick	Player	Club	Club	League	Notes
1	1	Sam Walsh	Carlton	Geelong Falcons	TAC Cup	
1	2	Jack Lukosius	Gold Coast	Woodville-West Torrens	SANFL	
1	3	Izak Rankine	Gold Coast	West Adelaide	SANFL	Free Agency compensation pick (Lynch)
1	4	Max King	St Kilda	Sandringham Dragons	TAC Cup	
1	5	Connor Rozee	Port Adelaide	North Adelaide	SANFL	Traded from Brisbane Lions
1	6	Ben King	Gold Coast	Sandringham Dragons	TAC Cup	Traded from Melb; received from Freo, Bris, Port, Freo
1	7	Bailey Smith	Western Bulldogs	Sandringham Dragons	TAC Cup	
1	8	Tarryn Thomas	North Melbourne	North Launceston	TSL	Next Gen. Academy (Indigenous) - North matched Crows bid.
1	9	Chayce Jones	Adelaide	Launceston	TSL	
1	10	Nick Blakey	Sydney	UNSW-Eastern Sub.	AFL Syd.	Academy selection
1	11	Jye Caldwell	GWS Giants	Bendigo Pioneers	TAC Cup	Traded from Essendon
1	12	Zak Butters	Port Adelaide	Western Jets	TAC Cup	
1	13	Isaac Quaynor	Collingwood	Oakleigh Chargers	TAC Cup	Next Generation Academy selection (Ghanaian descent)
1	14	Jackson Hately	GWS Giants	Central District	SANFL	Traded from Freo; received from Port, N.M.
1	15	Jordan Clark	Geelong	Claremont	WAFL	
1	16	Ned McHenry	Adelaide	Geelong Falcons	TAC Cup	Traded from Sydney
1	17	Sam Sturt	Fremantle	Dandenong Stingrays	TAC Cup	Traded from Greater Western Sydney
1	18	Xavier Duursma	Port Adelaide	Gippsland Power	TAC Cup	Traded from Hawthorn
1	19	Liam Stocker	Carlton	Sandringham Dragons	TAC Cup	Traded from Adelaide at the draft; received from Melbourne
1	20	Riley Collier-Dawkins	Richmond	Oakleigh Chargers	TAC Cup	
1	21	Ely Smith	Brisbane Lions	Murray Bushrangers	TAC Cup	Traded from Collingwood
1	22	Xavier O'Halloran	GWS Giants	Western Jets	TAC Cup	Traded from Freo; received from Bris, Suns, WCE
1	23	Jez McLennan	Gold Coast	Central District	SANFL	Traded from West Coast at the draft; Free Agency compo pick (Lycett)
2	24	Bobby Hill	GWS Giants	Perth	WAFL	Traded from Adelaide at the draft; received from Carlton
2	25	James Rowbottom	Sydney	Oakleigh Chargers	TAC Cup	Traded from West Coast at the draft; received from Gold Coast
2	26	Rhylee West	Western Bulldogs	Calder Cannons	TAC Cup	Father–son selection (son of Scott West)
2	27	Tom Sparrow	Melbourne	South Adelaide	SANFL	Traded from Freo; received from Port, St k
2	28	Xavier O'Neill	West Coast	Oakleigh Chargers	TAC Cup	Traded from Gold Coast; received from Brisbane Lions
2	29	Will Kelly	Collingwood	Oakleigh Chargers	TAC Cup	Father–son selection (son of Craig Kelly)
2	30	Will Hamill	Adelaide	Dandenong Stingrays	TAC Cup	Traded from Greater Western Sydney; received from Fremantle
2	31	Luke Foley	West Coast	Subiaco	WAFL	Traded from Sydney at the draft; received from Carl, W.B.
2	32	Luke Valente	Fremantle	Norwood	SANFL	Traded from W.Bulldogs at the draft; Free Agency compo pick (Dahlhaus)
2	33	James Jordon	Melbourne	Oakleigh Chargers	TAC Cup	Traded from St K; received from Syd, Carl, Adel
2	34	Kieren Briggs	GWS Giants	Pennant Hills	AFL Syd.	Academy selection
2	35	Bailey Williams	West Coast	Dandenong Stingrays	TAC Cup	Traded from Gold Coast at the draft; received from Essendon
2	36	Tom Berry	Brisbane Lions	GWV Rebels	TAC Cup	Traded from Fremantle; received from Port Adelaide
2	37	Laitham Vandermeer	Western Bulldogs	Murray Bushrangers	TAC Cup	Traded from Freo at the draft; received from North
2	38	Irving Mosquito	Essendon	Gippsland Power	TAC Cup	Traded from GWS; N.G. Academy eligible for Hawthorn, but they passed.
2	39	Jarrod Cameron	West Coast	Swan Districts	WAFL	Next Generation Academy selection (Indigenous)
2	40	Tom Joyce	Brisbane Lions	East Fremantle	WAFL	Traded from Port Adelaide; received from Hawthorn
2	41	Jack Bytel	St Kilda	Calder Cannons	TAC Cup	Traded from Melbourne
2	42	Connor McFadyen	Brisbane Lions	Wilston Grange	QAFL	Academy selection
2	43	Jack Ross	Richmond	Oakleigh Chargers	TAC Cup	
3	44	Justin McInerney	Sydney	Northern Knights	TAC Cup	Traded from Adelaide; received from Carlton
3	45	Ben Cavarra	Western Bulldogs	Williamstown	VFL	Traded from Freo at the draft; received from GWS, Carl, Geel, Bris
3	46	Curtis Taylor	North Melbourne	Calder Cannons	TAC Cup	Traded from Western Bulldogs at the draft
3	47	Matthew Parker	St Kilda	South Fremantle	WAFL	Traded from Melbourne; received from Adelaide
3	48	Ben Jarvis	Geelong	Norwood	SANFL	
3	49	Bailey Scott	North Melbourne	Broadbeach	QAFL	Father–son selection (son of Robert Scott)
3	50	Jacob Kennerley	Geelong	Norwood	SANFL	Traded from Collingwood; received from Sydney
3	51	Zac Foot	Sydney	Dandenong Stingrays	TAC Cup	
3	52	Jacob Koschitzke	Hawthorn	Murray Bushrangers	TAC Cup	
3	53	Aaron Nietschke	Melbourne	Central District	SANFL	
3	54	Nick Hind	St Kilda	Essendon	VFL	Traded from N.M. at the draft; received from Freo, Bris, Geel, Rich
3	55	Noah Answerth	Brisbane Lions	Oakleigh Chargers	TAC Cup	Traded from Collingwood
4	56	Marty Hore	Melbourne	Collingwood	VFL	Traded from N.M.; received from Syd, Geel, Bris
4	57	Lachie Schultz	Fremantle	Williamstown	VFL	Traded from Western Bulldogs at the draft; received from Fremantle
4	58	Fraser Turner	Richmond	Clarence	TSL	Traded from Western Bulldogs
4	59	Brett Bewley	Fremantle	Williamstown	VFL	Traded from Melb; received from St K, Adel, Suns, Port
4	60	Noah Gown	Essendon	Gippsland Power	TAC Cup	
4	61	Connor Idun	GWS Giants	Geelong Falcons	TAC Cup	Traded from St Kilda at the draft; received from Port Adelaide
4	62	Luke English	Richmond	Perth	WAFL	Traded from Adelaide; received from Suns, N.M.
4	63	Mathew Walker	Hawthorn	Murray Bushrangers	TAC Cup	Traded from Coll at the draft; Academy eligible for GWS, but they passed.
4	64	Lachlan Sholl	Adelaide	Calder Cannons	TAC Cup	Traded from Carlton at the draft; received from Geelong
4	65	Darcy Fort	Geelong	Central District	SANFL	Traded from Sydney
4	66	Finbar O'Dwyer	Carlton	Murray Bushrangers	TAC Cup	Traded from Greater Western Sydney
4	67	Robbie Young	St Kilda	North Adelaide	SANFL	Traded from Carlton at the draft; received from Adel, Melb
4	68	Jake Tarca	Geelong	South Adelaide	SANFL	Traded from Richmond at the draft
4	69	Joel Crocker	North Melbourne	Sandringham Dragons	TAC Cup	Father–son eligible (son of Darren Crocker)
5	70	Ben Silvagni	Carlton	Oakleigh Chargers	TAC Cup	Father–son eligible (son of Stephen Silvagni)
5	71	Caleb Graham	Gold Coast	Palm Beach Currumbin	QAFL	Traded from Brisbane Lions
5	72	Brayden Ham	Essendon	Geelong Falcons	TAC Cup	
5	73	Riley Grundy	Port Adelaide	Sturt	SANFL	
5	74	Oscar Brownless	Geelong	Geelong Falcons	TAC Cup	Father–son eligible (son of Billy Brownless)
5	75	Toby Bedford	Melbourne	Dandenong Stingrays	TAC Cup	Next Generation Academy eligible (Indigenous)
5	76	Boyd Woodcock	Port Adelaide	North Adelaide	SANFL	
5	77	Atu Bosenavulagi	Collingwood	Oakleigh Chargers	TAC Cup	Next Generation Academy eligible (born in Fiji)
5	78	Will Hayes	Western Bulldogs	Footscray	VFL	

=== Rookie elevations ===
Clubs were able to promote any player who was listed on their rookie list in 2018 to their 2019 primary playing list prior to the draft.

Table of rookie elevations
Player	Club	Ref.
Josh Thomas	Collingwood	
Bailey Banfield	Fremantle	
Taylin Duman	Fremantle	
Jack Henry	Geelong	
Mark O'Connor	Geelong	
Darcy MacPherson	Gold Coast	
Daniel Lloyd	Greater Western Sydney	
Conor Glass	Hawthorn	
James Cousins	Hawthorn	
David Mirra	Hawthorn	
Corey Maynard	Melbourne	
Dan Houston	Port Adelaide	
Callum Moore	Richmond	
Rowan Marshall	St Kilda	
Robbie Fox	Sydney	
Billy Gowers	Western Bulldogs	
Brad Lynch	Western Bulldogs	

== 2019 rookie draft ==
Table of rookie draft selections
Round	Pick	Player	Club	Recruited from		Notes
Round	Pick	Player	Club	Club	League	Notes
1	1	Hugh Goddard	Carlton	St Kilda	AFL	
1	2	Michael Rischitelli	Gold Coast	Gold Coast	AFL	
1	3	Callum Wilkie	St Kilda	North Adelaide	SANFL	
1	4	Ryan Bastinac	Brisbane Lions	Brisbane Lions	AFL	
1	5	Ethan Hughes	Fremantle	Fremantle	AFL	
1	6	Lachie Young	Western Bulldogs	Dandenong Stingrays	TAC Cup	
1	7	Kieran Strachan	Adelaide	Port Melbourne	VFL	
1	8	Tom Jok	Essendon	Collingwood	VFL	
1	9	Tobin Cox	Port Adelaide	Glenelg	SANFL	
1	10	Tom McKenzie	North Melbourne	Northern Knights	TAC Cup	
1	11	Tom Atkins	Geelong	Geelong	VFL	
1	12	Durak Tucker	Sydney	Peel Thunder	WAFL	
1	13	Passed	Greater Western Sydney	—	—	
1	14	Damon Greaves	Hawthorn	East Perth	WAFL	
1	15	Kade Chandler	Melbourne	Norwood	SANFL	
1	16	Jake Aarts	Richmond	Richmond	VFL	
1	17	Tim Broomhead	Collingwood	Collingwood	AFL	
1	18	Harry Edwards	West Coast	Swan Districts	WAFL	
2	19	Tomas Bugg	Carlton	Melbourne	AFL	
2	20	Jack Leslie	Gold Coast	Gold Coast	AFL	
2	21	Jacob Allison	Brisbane Lions	Brisbane Lions	AFL	
2	22	Tobe Watson	Fremantle	Swan Districts	WAFL	
2	23	Jordon Sweet	Western Bulldogs	North Adelaide	SANFL	
2	24	Paul Hunter	Adelaide	Adelaide	AFL	
2	25	Matt Dea	Essendon	Essendon	AFL	
2	26	Cam Hewett	Port Adelaide	Port Adelaide	AFL	
2	27	Kyron Hayden	North Melbourne	North Melbourne	AFL	
2	28	Harry Reynolds	Sydney	Sandringham Dragons	TAC Cup	
2	29	Passed	Greater Western Sydney	—	—	
2	30	Will Golds	Hawthorn	Oakleigh Chargers	TAC Cup	
2	31	Passed	Melbourne	—	—	
2	32	Jacob Townsend	Richmond	Richmond	AFL	
2	33	Sam Murray	Collingwood	Collingwood	AFL	
2	34	Josh Smith	West Coast	Collingwood	AFL	
3	35	Passed	Carlton	—	—	
3	36	Brad Scheer	Gold Coast	Gold Coast	AFL	
3	37	Ryan Nyhuis	Fremantle	Fremantle	AFL	
3	38	Passed	Western Bulldogs	—	—	
3	39	Jordon Butts	Adelaide	Murray Bushrangers	TAC Cup	
3	40	Passed	Essendon	—	—	
3	41	Tom Wilkinson	North Melbourne	Southport	NEAFL	
3	42	Kurt Tippett	Sydney	Sydney	AFL	Tippett retired on 22 January 2018, but was retained on Sydney's 2019 list due to a contractual settlement.
3	43	Tim Mohr	Hawthorn	Greater Western Sydney	AFL	
3	44	Passed	Melbourne	—	—	
3	45	Mabior Chol	Richmond	Richmond	AFL	
3	46	Passed	West Coast	—	—	
3	47	Harrison Wigg	Gold Coast	Gold Coast	AFL	
3	48	Passed	North Melbourne	—	—	
3	49	Will Langford	Hawthorn	Hawthorn	AFL	Langford retired on 30 October 2018, but was retained on Hawthorn's 2019 list due to a contractual settlement.
3	50	Passed	Richmond	—	—	
4	51	Passed	Gold Coast	—	—	
4	52	Passed	Richmond	—	—	

=== Category B rookie selections ===
Clubs were able to nominate category B rookies to join their club in 2019.

Table of Category B rookie selections
Name	Club	Origin	Note	Ref
Tom Fullarton	Brisbane Lions	Brisbane Bullets (NBL)	3-year non-registered player (basketball)	
James Madden	Brisbane Lions	Dublin GAA	International selection (Ireland)	
Matthew Owies	Carlton	Seattle Redhawks (NCAA)	3-year non-registered player (basketball)	
Anton Tohill	Collingwood	Derry GAA	International selection (Ireland)	
Mark Keane	Collingwood	Cork GAA	International selection (Ireland)	
Jason Carter	Fremantle	Peel Thunder	Next Generation Academy selection (Indigenous)	
Stefan Okunbor	Geelong	Kerry GAA	International selection (Ireland)	
Blake Schlensog	Geelong	Geelong Falcons	Next Generation Academy selection (Indigenous)	
Callum Brown	Greater Western Sydney	Derry GAA	International selection (Ireland)	
Austin Bradtke	Melbourne	Melbourne Tigers (SEABL)	3-year non-registered player (basketball)	
Guy Walker	Melbourne	Melbourne Renegades (BBL)	3-year non-registered player (cricket)	
Red Óg Murphy	North Melbourne	Sligo GAA	International selection (Ireland)	
Kai Pudney	Port Adelaide	Woodville-West Torrens	Next Generation Academy selection (Japanese descent)	
Martin Frederick	Port Adelaide	Woodville-West Torrens	Next Generation Academy selection (Sudanese descent)	
Sam Alabakis	St Kilda	Louisiana–Monroe Warhawks (NCAA)	3-year non-registered player (basketball)	
Sam Wicks	Sydney	Sydney (NEAFL)	NSW zone selection	
Patrick Bines	West Coast	Melbourne Tigers (SEABL)	3-year non-registered player (basketball)	
Brodie Riach	West Coast	Altona Gators (Big V)	3-year non-registered player (basketball)	
Buku Khamis	Western Bulldogs	Western Jets	Next Generation Academy selection (born in Sudan)	

=== Pre-season supplemental selection period ===
Shortly before the National draft, the AFL introduced a new mechanism to allow clubs to sign certain eligible players direct to their Rookie List, rather than through the draft, provided the club had vacancies on their rookie list. Eligible players could be listed between December and March.

Player	Club	Recruited from		Notes	Ref
Player	Club	Club	League	Notes	Ref
Matt Cottrell	Carlton	Dandenong Stingrays	TAC Cup		
Michael Gibbons	Carlton	Williamstown	VFL		
Zac Clarke	Essendon	Subiaco	WAFL	Previously listed with Fremantle	
Sam Fletcher	Gold Coast	Dandenong Stingrays	TAC Cup		
Shane Mumford	Greater Western Sydney	Greater Western Sydney	AFL	Retired in 2017	
Ned Reeves	Hawthorn	Box Hill Hawks	VFL		
Corey Wagner	Melbourne	Casey Demons	VFL	Previously listed with North Melbourne	
Jay Lockhart	Melbourne	Casey Demons	VFL		
Tom Campbell	North Melbourne	Western Bulldogs	AFL		
Mav Weller	Richmond	St Kilda	AFL		
Sydney Stack	Richmond	Perth	WAFL		
Jonathon Marsh	St Kilda	East Fremantle	WAFL	Previously listed with Collingwood	
Sam Rowe	St Kilda	Carlton	AFL		
Hayden McLean	Sydney	South Adelaide	SANFL		
Keegan Brooksby	West Coast	South Adelaide	SANFL	Previously listed with Gold Coast	

== See also ==
- 2018 AFL Women's draft
