= Irving Mosquito =

Australian rules footballer

Personal information
- Full name: Irving Mosquito
- Born: 24 August 2000 (age 26); Halls Creek, Western Australia
- Original team: Gippsland Power (NAB League)
- Draft: No. 38, 2018 national draft
- Height: 176 cm (5 ft 9 in)
- Weight: 72 kg (159 lb)
- Position: Forward

Playing career^{1}
Years	Club	Games (Goals)
2020–2021	Essendon	4 (2)
- ^{1} Playing statistics correct to the end of 2021 season.

Irving Mosquito (born 24 August 2000) is a former professional Australian rules footballer who played for the Essendon Football Club in the Australian Football League (AFL). He was drafted by the Essendon Football Club with the 38th pick in the 2018 national draft.

== Early football ==
Mosquito played for the Gippsland Power in the NAB League for two seasons. Mosquito was selected to play for Vic Country in the AFL Under 18 Championships, but was unable to get a game due to injury. He was a member of the Hawthorn's Next Generation Academy program, which gave the Hawks the right to match any draft selection made by other clubs during the 2018 AFL draft. However, they chose not to match Essendon's bid at selection 38.

== AFL career ==
Mosquito made his debut for Essendon in the Dreamtime match, played in Darwin, in the 13th round of the 2020 AFL season, scoring two goals.

After four games, Mosquito awkwardly twisted his left knee and ruptured his anterior cruciate ligament, an injury that forced him to miss the 2021 season. On 13 September 2021, Essendon delisted him after playing just four games in two years, due to his lack of desire to return to AFL level after suffering the injury.

== Statistics ==
Legend
G	Goals	K	Kicks	D	Disposals	T	Tackles
B	Behinds	H	Handballs	M	Marks

Season	Team	No.	Games	Totals							Averages (per game)						
Season	Team	No.	Games	G	B	K	H	D	M	T	G	B	K	H	D	M	T
2020	Essendon	22	4	2	4	15	17	32	9	7	0.5	1.0	3.8	4.3	8.0	2.3	1.8
Career			4	2	4	15	17	32	9	7	0.5	1.0	3.8	4.3	8.0	2.3	1.8

== Personal life ==
Mosquito moved to Briagolong in Gippsland at the age of 12. He was educated at Gippsland Grammar.
