= Sam Wicks =

Australian football league player

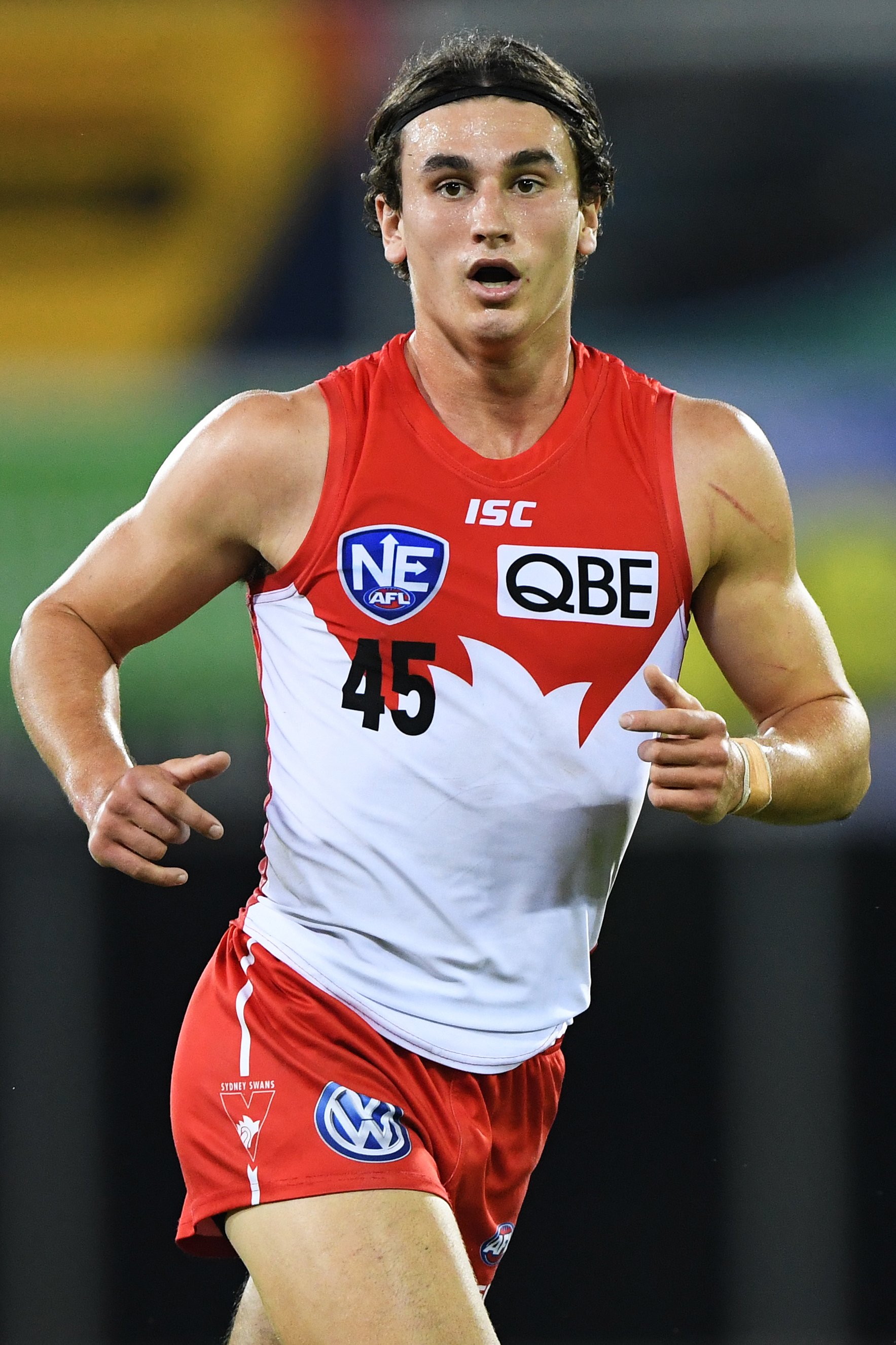
- Wicks in July 2019

Personal information
- Nicknames: Wicksy, Candles
- Born: 14 September 1999 (age 27); Manly, New South Wales
- Original team: Sydney Swans (NEAFL)/ Manly Warringah Giants
- Draft: 2018 Category B Rookie Selection
- Debut: 6 August 2020, Sydney vs. Collingwood, at The Gabba
- Height: 180 cm (5 ft 11 in)
- Weight: 80 kg (176 lb)
- Position: Defender

Club information
- Current club: Sydney
- Number: 15

Playing career^{1}
Years	Club	Games (Goals)
2019–	Sydney	103 (45)
- ^{1} Playing statistics correct to the end of round 22, 2026.

Sam Wicks (born 14 September 1999) is an Australian rules footballer who plays for the Sydney Swans in the Australian Football League (AFL). He was selected by the Sydney Swans as a Category B rookie from the NSW zone.

== Early football ==
Wicks played junior football for the Manly Bombers and Manly Warringah Wolves. In 2010, Wicks joined the Sydney Swans Academy. In June 2017, Wicks earned a Rising Star nomination in the North East Australian Football League (NEAFL).

== AFL career ==
=== 2020 season: debut ===
Wicks was elevated to Sydney's senior list in June 2020, alongside teammate Barry O'Connor. Wicks debuted in Sydney's 9 point loss to Collingwood in Round 10 of the 2020 AFL season. In his first game, Wicks picked up 1 goal, 9 disposals, 1 mark and 6 tackles. On his debut, Wicks was involved with a controversy surrounding the material of his boots after Collingwood player Isaac Quaynor sustained a large gash on his leg while attempting to tackle Wicks. The steel studs on the boots Wicks was wearing for the match were ruled as non-league compliant. Neither Sydney or Wicks were sanctioned, but were given a warning.

=== 2021 season ===
Wicks quickly took his performances up a notch from the previous season, averaging 15.3 disposals and 2 goals a game after just three games. He had his breakout performance in Round 3, where he kicked 3 goals and 2 behinds, as well as collecting 21 disposals, in what was to be a game that saw him named best on ground, receiving the 10 AFLCA votes for that round.

== Statistics ==
Updated to the end of round 22, 2026.

Legend
G	Goals	K	Kicks	D	Disposals	T	Tackles
B	Behinds	H	Handballs	M	Marks

Season	Team	No.	Games	Totals							Averages (per game)							Votes
Season	Team	No.	Games	G	B	K	H	D	M	T	G	B	K	H	D	M	T	Votes
2019	Sydney	45	0	—	—	—	—	—	—	—	—	—	—	—	—	—	—	0
2020 (Note: The 2020 season was played with 17 home-and-away matches per team (down from 22) and 16-minute quarters with time on (down from 20-minute quarters with time on) due to the impact of the COVID-19 pandemic.)	Sydney	45	7	3	1	31	27	58	15	32	0.4	0.1	4.4	3.9	8.3	2.1	4.6	0
2021	Sydney	45	22	17	18	143	102	245	65	89	0.8	0.8	6.5	4.6	11.1	3.0	4.0	0
2022	Sydney	15	10	4	4	43	48	91	21	25	0.4	0.4	4.3	4.8	9.1	2.1	2.5	0
2023	Sydney	15	11	10	9	65	52	117	19	59	0.9	0.8	5.9	4.7	10.6	1.7	5.4	0
2024	Sydney	15	16	10	6	72	81	153	29	32	0.6	0.4	4.5	5.1	9.6	1.8	2.0	0
2025	Sydney	15	21	0	3	209	98	307	51	56	0.0	0.1	10.0	4.7	14.6	2.4	2.7	0
2026	Sydney	15	16	1	3	150	120	270	57	42	0.1	0.2	9.4	7.5	16.9	3.6	2.6	0
Career			103	45	44	713	528	1241	257	335	0.4	0.4	6.9	5.1	12.0	2.5	3.3	0
