= Jason Carter (Australian footballer) =

Australian rules footballer (born 2000)

Personal information
- Full name: Jason Patrick Gordon Carter
- Born: 11 January 2000 (age 26); Wyndham, Western Australia
- Original teams: Port Wyndham Crocs, (East Kimberley Football Association) / Claremont (WAFL)
- Draft: Next Generation Academy selection, 2018 AFL draft, Fremantle
- Height: 185 cm (6 ft 1 in)
- Weight: 82 kg (181 lb)
- Position: Half-back flank

Playing career^{1}
Years	Club	Games (Goals)
2019	Peel Thunder	15 (3)
2019–2020	Fremantle	2 (0)
2020–2023	Claremont	37 (5)
2024–	South Fremantle	1 (0)
Total		55 (9)
- ^{1} Playing statistics correct to the end of 2024.

Jason Patrick Gordon Carter (born 11 January 2000) is an Australian rules footballer who played for the Fremantle Football Club in the Australian Football League (AFL).

== Football career ==
Originally from the small town of Wyndham in the Kimberley region of Western Australia, he played a few colts games for Claremont in 2017 whilst attending school at Aquinas College, Perth. He also played for Western Australia at the 2016 Under 16 National Championships, where he was named in the All-Australian team. He was selected to play in the 2017 AFL Under 18 Championships but injured his knee during a trial game and was unable to compete. He was then invited to join Fremantle's Next Generation Academy at the beginning of 2018, and switched to play for Fremantle's affiliate team, Peel Thunder.

He was drafted to Fremantle's rookie list via the Next Generation Academy (NGA) system at the 2018 AFL draft, becoming the first NGA player to be recruited by Fremantle, and the first player from Wyndham to be on an AFL list.

After spending most of the 2019 season playing for Peel in the West Australian Football League (WAFL), Carter was elevated to the senior list in July. In August, he made his AFL debut in Fremantle's upset win over Geelong.

In the 2020 season that was interrupted by the coronavirus outbreak, Carter along with Fremantle teammates were caught attending a house party in breach of WA government protocols. Later in August, Carter was caught by Police drink driving and was given a club based suspension. Carter asked to be released from his contract and was delisted.
