= Tim Mohr (footballer) =

Australian rules footballer (born 1988)

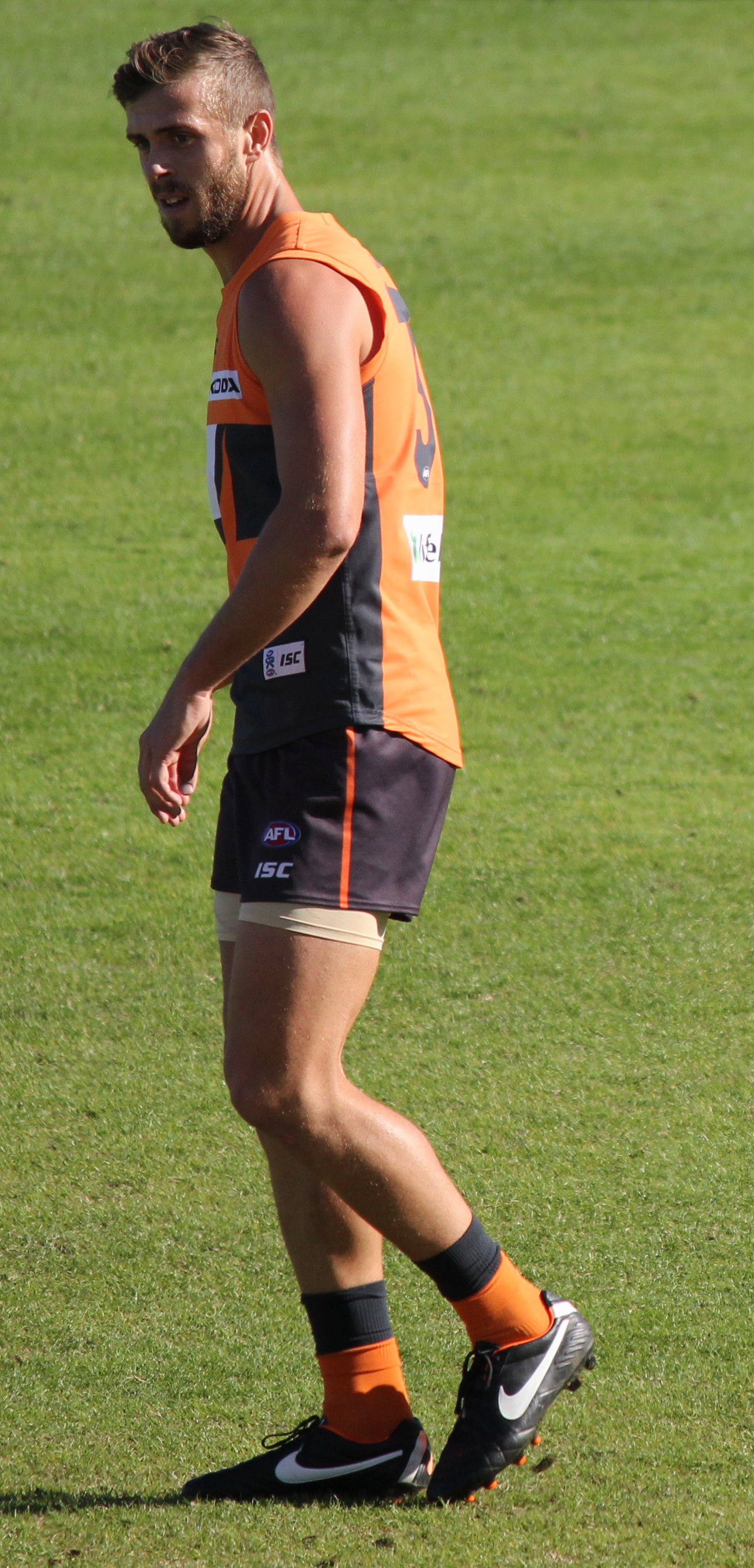
- Mohr playing for Greater Western Sydney in 2012

Personal information
- Full name: Timothy Mohr
- Born: 19 October 1988 (age 38); Launceston Tasmania
- Original team: Launceston Blues/Casey Scorpions
- Draft: Pre selection 2011
- Debut: Round 1, 2012, Greater Western Sydney vs. Sydney, at ANZ Stadium
- Height: 196 cm (6 ft 5 in)
- Weight: 103 kg (227 lb)
- Position: Defender

Playing career^{1}
Years	Club	Games (Goals)
2012–2018	Greater Western Sydney	48 (1)
2019	Hawthorn	0 (0)
Total		48 (1)
- ^{1} Playing statistics correct to the end of 2019.

Career highlights
- Inaugural Greater Western Sydney team, 2012

Timothy Mohr (born 19 October 1988) is a former professional Australian rules footballer who played for the Greater Western Sydney Giants and the Hawthorn Football Club in the Australian Football League (AFL).

== Early career ==
He was a premiership player for Launceston Football Club before he moved to the VFL, where he played for four years, winning Casey's best and fairest award in 2011.

== AFL career ==
He was recruited from the Casey Scorpions in the Victorian Football League (VFL) prior to the 2011 AFL draft as one of the new club's selections of players who had previously nominated for the draft. Mohr made his debut in Round 1 of the 2012 AFL season against Sydney. He played in 13 games in his debut season before a groin complaint curtailed his season. 2013 was his best as he played every game for the year, he held down the difficult position of centre half back. He was sidelined early in 2014 with a foot issue, made his way back into the side before damaging his ACL late in the season. In 2015 Mohr managed a few games in the NEAFL before re injuring his left knee and another reconstruction was required. The popular clubman recovered and but in his second game back from injury hurt his hamstrings and that was his 2016 season done. The improvement of the Giants list by 2017 and the maturing of their young list made it difficult for Mohr to break into the side as younger players were given priority over him.

By 2018 Mohr was seen as a backup player because of his advancing years. He managed two games when the Giants were hit by injuries and was later delisted at the end of the 2018 season.

Hawthorn rookied him with their third pick in the 2018 AFL draft rookie draft. While playing for Hawthorn's VFL affiliate Box Hill, Mohr suffered a dislocated knee. It was announced that Mohr would require surgery and would miss a "large chunk" of football.

== Statistics ==
Statistics are correct to the end of 2019.

Legend
G	Goals	K	Kicks	D	Disposals	T	Tackles
B	Behinds	H	Handballs	M	Marks

Season	Team	No.	Games	Totals							Averages (per game)						
Season	Team	No.	Games	G	B	K	H	D	M	T	G	B	K	H	D	M	T
2012	Greater Western Sydney	39	13	1	0	98	60	158	53	24	0.1	0.0	7.5	4.6	12.2	4.1	1.8
2013	Greater Western Sydney	39	22	0	1	239	75	314	104	31	0.0	0.0	10.9	3.4	14.3	4.7	1.4
2014	Greater Western Sydney	39	8	0	2	79	31	110	34	17	0.0	0.3	9.9	3.9	13.8	4.3	2.1
2015	Greater Western Sydney	39	0	–	–	–	–	–	–	–	–	–	–	–	–	–	–
2016	Greater Western Sydney	39	2	0	0	11	2	13	5	3	0.0	0.0	5.5	1.0	6.5	2.5	1.5
2017	Greater Western Sydney	39	1	0	0	7	2	9	4	1	0.0	0.0	7.0	2.0	9.0	4.0	1.0
2018	Greater Western Sydney	39	2	0	0	15	4	19	6	4	0.0	0.0	7.5	2.0	9.5	3.0	2.0
2019	Hawthorn	39	0	–	–	–	–	–	–	–	–	–	–	–	–	–	–
Career			48	1	3	449	174	623	206	80	0.0	0.1	9.4	3.6	13.0	4.3	1.7
