= Brayden Ham =

Australian rules footballer

Personal information
- Nickname: The Don
- Born: 25 April 1999 (age 27)
- Original team: Geelong Falcons (TAC Cup)
- Draft: No. 72, 2018 national draft
- Debut: Round 5, 2019, Essendon vs. North Melbourne, at Marvel Stadium
- Height: 181 cm (5 ft 11 in)
- Weight: 70 kg (154 lb)
- Position: Wing / Small Forward

Club information
- Current club: Essendon
- Number: 33

Playing career^{1}
Years	Club	Games (Goals)
2019–2022	Essendon	45 (9)
- ^{1} Playing statistics correct to the end of 2022.

Brayden Ham (born 25 April 1999) is an Australian rules footballer who last played for Essendon in the Australian Football League (AFL). In his junior career in the TAC Cup he played many positions, before he was selected by Essendon with pick 72 in the 2018 national draft. Ham made his debut in round 5 of the 2019 season.

== Junior career ==
From Torquay, Victoria, Ham played junior football in the 2018 TAC Cup for the Geelong Falcons as an over-aged player. He played in a variety of positions: becoming a forward after starting the season in the midfield, and sometimes playing as a defender. Ham finished second in the Falcons' best and fairest behind Sam Walsh, kicking 22 goals in 16 matches. He attended the state AFL draft combine and performed strongly in the endurance and sprint tests.

== AFL career ==
Ham was selected by Essendon with pick 72 in the 2018 national draft. He made his debut in round 5 of the 2019 season against North Melbourne as a late replacement for David Zaharakis, who had an infected cut on his knee. Ham finished 2019 having played 5 senior AFL matches, including an elimination final. He kicked 3 AFL goals for the year.

Ham played 10 senior matches in the 2020 season, bringing his career total to 15.

== Personal life ==
Ham studied sports science at university in 2018 but "didn’t think it was really for [him]". His two brothers are both involved in the Geelong Falcons development program.
