= Curtis Taylor (Australian footballer) =

Australian rules footballer (born 2000)

Personal information
- Born: 6 April 2000 (age 26)
- Original team: Calder Cannons (TAC Cup)
- Draft: No. 46, 2018 national draft
- Debut: Round 8, 2019, North Melbourne vs. Geelong, at Marvel Stadium
- Height: 187 cm (6 ft 2 in)
- Weight: 78 kg (172 lb)
- Position: Midfielder

Playing career
Years	Club	Games (Goals)
2019–2024	North Melbourne	76 (33)

Curtis Taylor (born 6 April 2000) is an Australian rules footballer playing for Collingwood Football Club in the Victorian Football League (VFL). He previously played for North Melbourne Football Club in Australian Football League (AFL). Taylor played junior football in the TAC Cup before he was selected in the 2018 AFL draft. He made his AFL debut in the 2019 season.

== Junior career ==
In 2016, Taylor played in a senior Essendon District Football League premiership with Keilor. He played football the next year for the Calder Cannons in the TAC Cup as a bottom-ager. In 2018, Taylor averaged one goal and 18 disposals per match for the Cannons and represented Vic Metro at the 2018 AFL Under 18 Championships. Throughout the year, he mostly played as a forward but had stints in the midfield. Ahead of the 2018 AFL draft, Taylor strained his adductor and was unable to test at the draft combine. He was considered likely to be drafted in the late first round to second round – he was invited by the AFL to the first night of the draft – and often compared to medium West Coast forward Mark LeCras. Taylor's accurate kicking and marking were praised but his speed was highlighted as a deficiency.

== AFL career ==
Taylor was drafted by North Melbourne with pick 46 in the 2018 national draft. He was often cited as a draft "slider", which The Age attributed to clubs' concerns over his commitment at training. He made his AFL debut in round 8 of the 2019 season after Scott Thompson was ruled out with an adductor injury.

At the end of the 2024 AFL season Taylor was delisted by North Melbourne.

== Statistics ==
Legend
G	Goals	K	Kicks	D	Disposals	T	Tackles
B	Behinds	H	Handballs	M	Marks

Season	Team	No.	Games	Totals							Averages (per game)							Votes
Season	Team	No.	Games	G	B	K	H	D	M	T	G	B	K	H	D	M	T	Votes
2019	North Melbourne	31	2	0	1	6	6	12	3	4	0.0	0.5	3.0	3.0	6.0	1.5	2.0	0
2020 (Note: The 2020 season was played with 17 home-and-away matches per team (down from 22) and 16-minute quarters with time on (down from 20-minute quarters with time on) due to the impact of the COVID-19 pandemic.)	North Melbourne	31	9	5	2	51	41	92	32	14	0.6	0.2	5.7	4.6	10.2	3.6	1.6	0
2021	North Melbourne	5	19	7	5	154	96	250	79	40	0.4	0.3	8.1	5.1	13.2	4.2	2.1	0
2022	North Melbourne	5	22	9	8	237	101	338	107	43	0.4	0.4	10.8	4.6	15.4	4.9	2.0	0
2023	North Melbourne	5	16	9	7	148	73	221	76	30	0.6	0.4	9.3	4.6	13.8	4.8	1.9	0
2024	North Melbourne	5	8	3	0	57	29	86	30	18	0.4	0.0	7.1	3.6	10.8	3.8	2.3	0
2025	North Melbourne	5	0	—	—	—	—	—	—	—	—	—	—	—	—	—	—	0
Career			76	33	23	653	346	999	327	149	0.4	0.3	8.6	4.6	13.1	4.3	2.0	0
