= AFL trade week =

Exchange period in the Australian Football League

The AFL trade week is a period of time during which Australian Football League (AFL) clubs are permitted to exchange players and draft picks with each other. Trade week takes place shortly after the conclusion of each AFL season, but prior to the national draft. This is the only time during the AFL season or off-season when clubs are allowed to make trades.

Clubs are permitted to exchange players, draft picks in the next national draft, or compensation draft picks during trade week; draft picks in the pre-season draft or the rookie draft, or non-compensation draft picks for future seasons cannot be traded. It is permissible for a club to trade a player in exchange for a very low draft pick that it does not ultimately use, serving effectively as a direct player transfer.

The majority of trades are simple exchanges between two clubs, but more complicated exchanges involving three or more clubs are permissible, and are not uncommon.

From the 2012 season onwards, the duration of trade week has been lengthened from one week to three. AFL Football Operations Manager Adrian Anderson explained that the AFL had decided to expand trade week due to the introduction of free agency.
