= Tom Jok =

Sudanese-born Australian rules footballer

Personal information
- Full name: Tuth Jok Jok
- Born: 1 January 1997 (age 29); Nasir, Sudan (now South Sudan)
- Original teams: Collingwood VFL, St Kevins College, STKOB
- Draft: No. 8 in the 2019 Rookie draft
- Debut: 23 August 2019, Essendon vs. Collingwood, at MCG
- Height: 190 cm (6 ft 3 in)
- Weight: 83 kg (183 lb)
- Position: Wing/ Ruck

Club information
- Current club: Essendon
- Number: 46

Playing career
Years	Club	Games (Goals)
2019	Essendon	1 (0)

Tuth "Tom" Jok (born 1 January 1997) is a Sudanese born Australian rules footballer who played for the Essendon Football Club in the Australian Football League (AFL). Jok attended Elsternwick Primary School after moving to Australia from Sudan as a young boy before moving to Pakenham Grammar then eventually moving to St Kevin’s College. There, he was a star in the 1st XVIII Australian rules football team for a number of years in multiple roles. He continued to play football for St Kevin's Old Boys, winning the VAFA flag whilst also playing for the Collingwood VFL side. Jok trained alongside St Kilda during the off season, winning their 2 km time trial and gaining praise from player Dan Hannebery.

Following this, he was selected at pick #8 in the 2019 Rookie draft. He made his senior debut against Collingwood in Round 23 of the 2019 season. Jok was delisted by the Essendon Football Club after only one year, managing to play just the one AFL match.
