= Rhylee West =

Australian Rules footballer (born 2000)

Personal information
- Full name: Rhylee West
- Born: 12 July 2000 (age 26)
- Original teams: Calder Cannons (TAC Cup); St Kevin’s College (APS)
- Draft: No. 26 (F/S), 2018 national draft
- Debut: 28 July 2019, Western Bulldogs vs. Fremantle, at Docklands
- Height: 182 cm (6 ft 0 in)
- Weight: 85 kg (187 lb)
- Position: Forward / midfielder

Club information
- Current club: Western Bulldogs
- Number: 14

Playing career^{1}
| Years | Club | Games (Goals) |
| 2019- | Western Bulldogs | 105 (103) |
- ^{1} Playing statistics correct to the end of the 2026 season.

Career highlights
- Western Bulldogs Most Improved Player: 2025

Rhylee West (born 12 July 2000) is an Australian Rules footballer who plays for the Western Bulldogs in the Australian Football League (AFL). He was selected at pick number 26 in the 2018 national draft as a father-son selection. He made his senior debut against Fremantle in round 19 of the 2019 season.

He is the son of former Bulldogs player Scott West. He played his junior football for Strathmore in the Essendon District Football League. He later played for Calder Cannons in the elite TAC Cup.

== Statistics ==
Updated to the end of round 22, 2026.

Legend
| G | Goals | K | Kicks | D | Disposals | T | Tackles |
| B | Behinds | H | Handballs | M | Marks |

| Season | Team | No. | Games | Totals | | | | | | | Averages (per game) | | | | | | | Votes |
| Season | Team | No. | Games | G | B | K | H | D | M | T | G | B | K | H | D | M | T | Votes |
|---|---|---|---|---|---|---|---|---|---|---|---|---|---|---|---|---|---|---|
| 2019 | Western Bulldogs | 14 | 3 | 2 | 0 | 16 | 22 | 38 | 7 | 3 | 0.7 | 0.0 | 5.3 | 7.3 | 12.7 | 2.3 | 1.0 | 0 |
| 2020 (Note: The 2020 season was played with 17 home-and-away matches per team (down from 22) and 16-minute quarters with time on (down from 20-minute quarters with time on) due to the impact of the COVID-19 pandemic.) | Western Bulldogs | 14 | 4 | 1 | 0 | 23 | 25 | 48 | 12 | 7 | 0.3 | 0.0 | 5.8 | 6.3 | 12.0 | 3.0 | 1.8 | 0 |
| 2021 | Western Bulldogs | 14 | 4 | 0 | 2 | 6 | 3 | 9 | 2 | 3 | 0.0 | 0.5 | 1.5 | 0.8 | 2.3 | 0.5 | 0.8 | 0 |
| 2022 | Western Bulldogs | 14 | 14 | 11 | 9 | 78 | 84 | 162 | 37 | 53 | 0.8 | 0.6 | 5.6 | 6.0 | 11.6 | 2.6 | 3.8 | 0 |
| 2023 | Western Bulldogs | 14 | 12 | 7 | 6 | 62 | 75 | 137 | 29 | 42 | 0.6 | 0.5 | 5.2 | 6.3 | 11.4 | 2.4 | 3.5 | 0 |
| 2024 | Western Bulldogs | 14 | 21 | 25 | 16 | 149 | 105 | 254 | 61 | 67 | 1.2 | 0.8 | 7.1 | 5.0 | 12.1 | 2.9 | 3.2 | 0 |
| 2025 | Western Bulldogs | 14 | 23 | 39 | 19 | 171 | 142 | 313 | 70 | 82 | 1.7 | 0.8 | 7.4 | 6.2 | 13.6 | 3.0 | 3.6 | 0 |
| 2026 | Western Bulldogs | 14 | 20 | 16 | 12 | 145 | 123 | 268 | 67 | 59 | 0.8 | 0.6 | 7.3 | 6.2 | 13.4 | 3.4 | 3.0 | 0 |
| Career | | | 101 | 101 | 64 | 650 | 579 | 1229 | 285 | 316 | 1.0 | 0.6 | 6.4 | 5.7 | 12.2 | 2.8 | 3.1 | 0 |
