= James Rowbottom =

Australian rules footballer

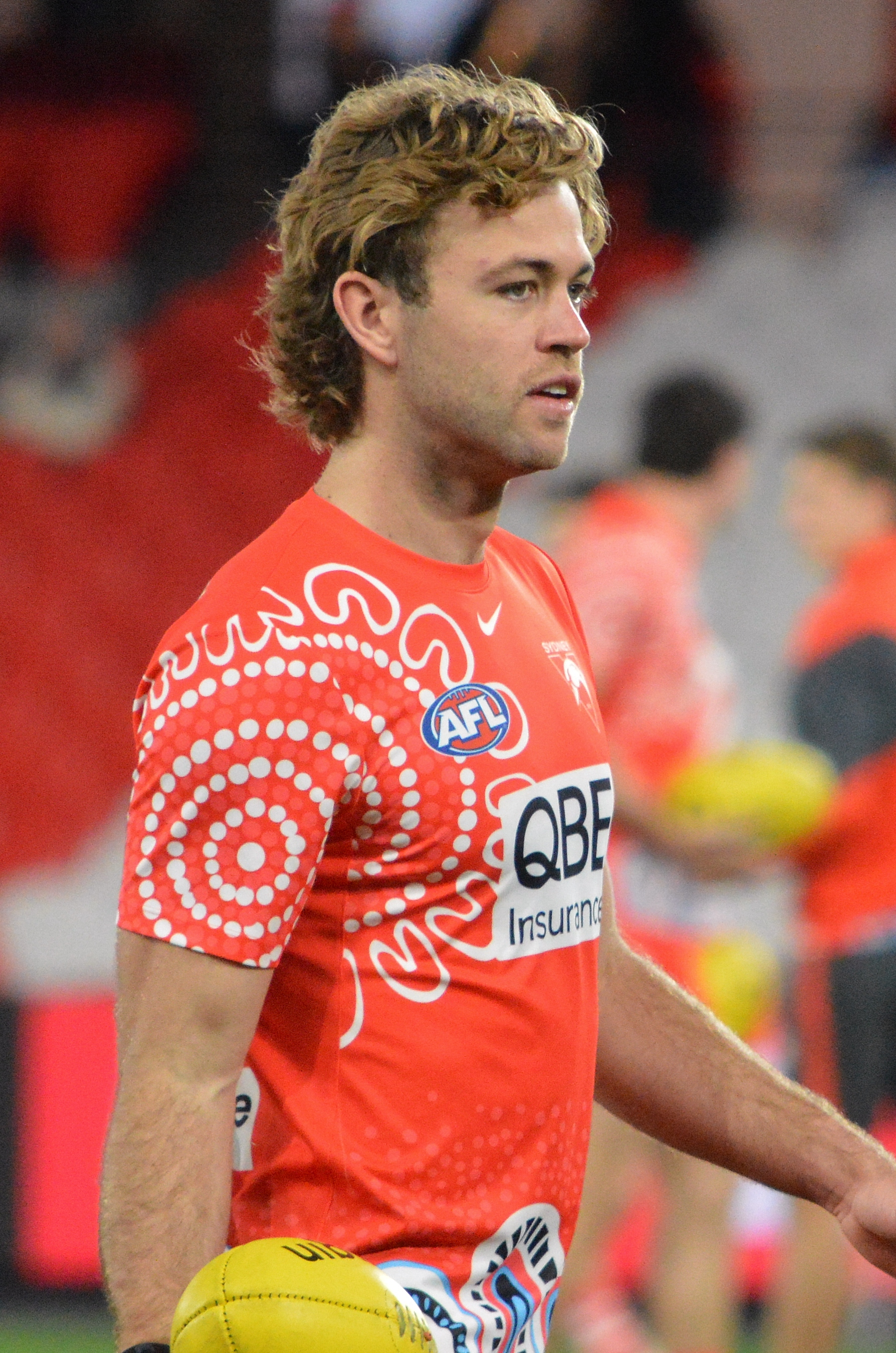
- Rowbottom in August 2026

Personal information
- Full name: James Rowbottom
- Nickname: Rowy
- Born: 19 September 2000 (age 26)
- Original team: Oakleigh Chargers (TAC Cup)/St Kevin’s College (APS)
- Draft: No. 25, 2018 AFL draft, Sydney
- Height: 186 cm (6 ft 1 in)
- Weight: 76 kg (168 lb)
- Position: Midfielder

Club information
- Current club: Sydney
- Number: 8

Playing career^{1}
Years	Club	Games (Goals)
2019–	Sydney	160 (53)
- ^{1} Playing statistics correct to the end of round 22, 2026.

James Rowbottom (born 19 September 2000) is a professional Australian rules footballer who plays for the Sydney Swans in the Australian Football League (AFL). He was recruited by the Sydney Swans with the 25th draft pick in the 2018 AFL draft.

== Early life ==
Rowbottom participated in the Auskick program at Glenferrie in Hawthorn. He played his junior football with Prahran, Camberwell Sharks and St Kevin's College before progressing to the Oakleigh Chargers in the TAC Cup. He was recruited by the Sydney Swans in 2018 AFL draft at Pick No. 25.

== Personal life ==
He is the nephew of former AFL player and current Channel 7 AFL commentator Brian Taylor and the brother of Charlie Rowbottom, who was drafted by Gold Coast with the number one draft pick in the 2021 AFL Women's draft.

== Statistics ==
Updated to the end of round 22, 2026.

Legend
G	Goals	K	Kicks	D	Disposals	T	Tackles
B	Behinds	H	Handballs	M	Marks
†	Led the league for the season

Season	Team	No.	Games	Totals							Averages (per game)							Votes
Season	Team	No.	Games	G	B	K	H	D	M	T	G	B	K	H	D	M	T	Votes
2019	Sydney	8	12	4	5	90	74	164	32	59	0.3	0.4	7.5	6.2	13.7	2.7	4.9	0
2020 (Note: The 2020 season was played with 17 home-and-away matches per team (down from 22) and 16-minute quarters with time on (down from 20-minute quarters with time on) due to the impact of the COVID-19 pandemic.)	Sydney	8	16	4	4	132	105	237	22	58	0.3	0.3	8.3	6.6	14.8	1.4	3.6	0
2021	Sydney	8	17	6	3	152	110	262	35	105	0.4	0.2	8.9	6.5	15.4	2.1	6.2	0
2022	Sydney	8	24	8	7	279	164	443	60	163	0.3	0.3	11.6	6.8	18.5	2.5	6.8	0
2023	Sydney	8	24	6	6	238	192	430	27	176	0.3	0.3	9.9	8.0	17.9	1.1	7.3	0
2024	Sydney	8	24	7	7	236	220	456	47	186^{†}	0.3	0.3	9.8	9.2	19.0	2.0	7.8	4
2025	Sydney	8	23	9	11	218	151	369	54	168	0.4	0.5	9.5	6.6	16.0	2.3	7.3	3
2026	Sydney	8	20	9	6	157	151	308	29	124	0.5	0.3	7.9	7.6	15.4	1.5	6.2	0
Career			160	53	49	1502	1167	2669	306	1039	0.3	0.3	9.4	7.3	16.7	1.9	6.5	7
