= Brett Bewley =

Australian rules footballer

Personal information
- Full name: Brett Bewley
- Born: 14 April 1995 (age 31)
- Original team: Williamstown (VFL)
- Draft: 1. 59, 2018 AFL draft, Fremantle
- Height: 185 cm (6 ft 1 in)
- Weight: 87 kg (192 lb)
- Position: Midfielder

Playing career^{1}
Years	Club	Games (Goals)
2019–2021	Fremantle	25 (8)
- ^{1} Playing statistics correct to the end of 2021.

Brett Bewley (born 14 April 1995) is an Australian rules footballer who played for the Fremantle Football Club in the Australian Football League (AFL).

He was the 59th overall draft pick in the 2018 AFL draft from Williamstown in the Victorian Football League (VFL). He played junior football for the Western Jets in the TAC Cup and Darley Football Club in the Ballarat Football League. Bewley played 70 games and kicked 31 goals for the VFL Seagulls from 2014–18, where he was runner-up in the Club best and fairest award in 2018 and played in the Seconds premiership in 2014. He was named in the VFL Team-of-the-Year in 2017 and 2018.

He made his debut in Round 10 of the 2019 AFL season, against Brisbane at Optus Stadium, after playing well for Fremantle's reserves team, Peel Thunder in the West Australian Football League (WAFL). In August 2021 Bewley was informed that he would not be offered a contract extension for 2022.

Brett is now back dominating local football playing with his junior club Darley in the Ballarat Football League.
