= Robbie Young (Australian footballer) =

Australian rules footballer (born 1995)

Personal information
- Born: 2 March 1995 (age 31)
- Original team: Port Adelaide (SANFL)
- Draft: No. 67 in the 2018 national draft
- Debut: 18 May 2019, St Kilda vs. Collingwood, at MCG
- Height: 178 cm (5 ft 10 in)
- Weight: 76 kg (168 lb)

Club information
- Current club: St Kilda
- Number: 41

Playing career^{1}
| Years | Club | Games (Goals) |
| 2019 | St Kilda | 3 (2) |
- ^{1} Playing statistics correct to the end of 2019.

Robbie Young (born 2 March 1995) is an Australian rules footballer who played for the St Kilda Football Club in the Australian Football League (AFL). He was selected at pick #67 in the 2018 national draft after playing in the 2018 North Adelaide Football Club premiership side. He made his senior debut against Collingwood in round 9 of the 2019 season, and was delisted at that season's conclusion.

In 2021, he was playing for North Adelaide Football Club in the SANFL. In July that year, Young was the victim of racial abuse from former Adelaide Football Club captain Taylor Walker during a SANFL match. Walker was subsequently suspended from playing AFL for six rounds after he was reported by an Adelaide Football Club official who witnessed the abuse.
