= Red Óg Murphy =

Irish Gaelic footballer (2000–2022)

Personal information
- Native name: Réamann Óg Ó Murchú (Irish)
- Born: 11 October 2000 Cork, Ireland
- Died: 1 April 2022 (aged 21) Dublin, Ireland
- Height: 6 ft 3 in (191 cm)

Sport
- Sport: Gaelic football
- Position: Right corner-forward
Club
- Years: Club
- Curry
Club titles
- Sligo titles: 0
College
- Years: College
- 2019–2022: DCU Dóchas Éireann
College titles
- Sigerson titles: 0
Inter-county*
| Years | County | Apps (scores) |
| 2020–2021 | Sligo | 1 (0-00) |
Inter-county titles
- Connacht titles: 0
- All-Irelands: 0
- NFL: 0
- All Stars: 0
- *Inter County team apps and scores correct as of 10:10, 2 April 2022.

Redmond Óg Murphy (11 October 2000 – 1 April 2022) was an Irish Gaelic footballer who played for Sligo Senior Championship club Curry and at inter-county level with the Sligo senior football team. He usually lined out as a forward.

== Career ==
Murphy played football as a schoolboy at St Attracta's College in Tubbercurry, while lining out at juvenile and underage levels with the Curry club. He first appeared on the inter-county scene as a member of the Sligo minor football team in 2017. Murphy made the switch to Australian rules football after signing for North Melbourne Football Club in 2018. After one season in the Australian Football League he returned to Ireland and linked up with DCU Dóchas Éireann and the Sligo under-20 football team in 2020. Murphy made his senior team debut during the 2020 National Football League. He was a regular on the team for two seasons before stepping away in November 2021.

== Death ==
Murphy died by suicide on 1 April 2022, aged 21.

Speaking to The Irish Times in November 2022, eight months on after his death, Murphy's parents Geraldine and Redmond said nobody knows why he did it and that he had no history of mental health issues and he gave no hint to anyone that he was struggling. In December, his parents appealed to anyone suffering mental health issues in silence to reach out to a loved one or a professional for help this Christmas.

== Career statistics ==
| Team | Year | National League | | | Connacht | | All-Ireland | | Total | |
| Team | Year | Division | Apps | Score | Apps | Score | Apps | Score | Apps | Score |
|---|---|---|---|---|---|---|---|---|---|---|
| Sligo | 2020 | Division 4 | 7 | 1-13 | — | | — | | 7 | 1-13 |
| Sligo | 2021 | Division 4 | 4 | 0-03 | 1 | 0-00 | — | | 5 | 0-03 |
| Career total | | | 11 | 1-16 | 1 | 0-00 | — | | 12 | 1-16 |
