= Jay Lockhart =

Australian rules footballer (born 1996)

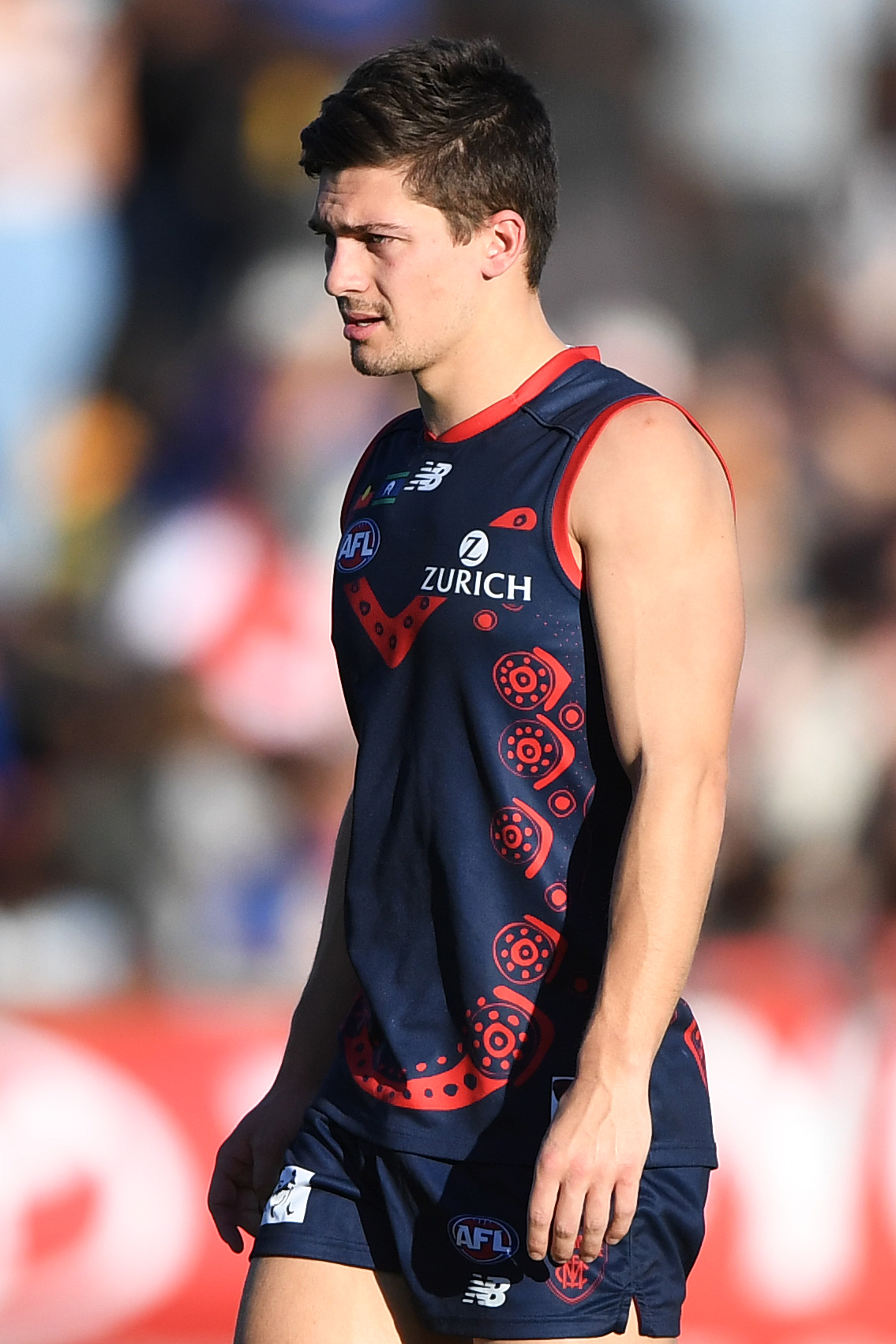
- Lockhart playing for Melbourne in July 2019

Personal information
- Born: 3 February 1996 (age 30)
- Original team: Casey Demons
- Draft: 2018 Pre-season supplemental selection period
- Debut: 30 March 2019, Melbourne vs. Geelong, at Kardinia Park
- Height: 177 cm (5 ft 10 in)
- Weight: 75 kg (165 lb)

Playing career^{1}
| Years | Club | Games (Goals) |
| 2019–2021 | Melbourne | 22 (9) |
- ^{1} Playing statistics correct to the end of round 15, 2021.

Jay Lockhart (born 3 February 1996) is an Australian rules footballer who currently plays for the Southport Football Club in the Victorian Football League (VFL). He previously played for Melbourne in the Australian Football League (AFL).

Lockhart joined Melbourne during the 2018 pre-season supplemental selection period. He made his senior debut against Geelong in round 2 of the 2019 season. He was delisted by Melbourne following the club's drought breaking premiership.

Before joining Casey, Lockhart played for North Launceston Football Club.

Lockhart played for Southport in the club's six-point 2024 VFL grand final loss to Werribee.

== Statistics ==
Statistics are correct to end of round 15, 2021

Legend
| G | Goals | K | Kicks | D | Disposals | T | Tackles |
| B | Behinds | H | Handballs | M | Marks |

| Season | Team | No. | Games | Totals | | | | | | | Averages (per game) | | | | | | |
| Season | Team | No. | Games | G | B | K | H | D | M | T | G | B | K | H | D | M | T |
|---|---|---|---|---|---|---|---|---|---|---|---|---|---|---|---|---|---|
| 2019 | Melbourne | 41 | 12 | 9 | 3 | 90 | 61 | 151 | 52 | 23 | 0.8 | 0.3 | 7.5 | 5.1 | 12.6 | 4.3 | 1.9 |
| 2020 (Note: The 2020 season was played with 17 home-and-away matches per team (down from 22) and 16-minute quarters with time on (down from 20-minute quarters with time on) due to the impact of the COVID-19 pandemic.) | Melbourne | 41 | 10 | 0 | 2 | 55 | 33 | 88 | 28 | 19 | 0.0 | 0.2 | 5.5 | 3.3 | 8.8 | 2.8 | 1.9 |
| 2021 | Melbourne | 41 | 0 | – | – | – | – | – | – | – | – | – | – | – | – | – | – |
| Career | | | 22 | 9 | 5 | 145 | 94 | 239 | 80 | 42 | 0.4 | 0.2 | 6.6 | 4.3 | 10.9 | 3.6 | 1.9 |
