= Kyron Hayden =

Australian rules footballer

Personal information
- Born: 7 June 1999 (age 27)
- Original team: Subiaco (WAFL)
- Draft: No. 62, 2017 national draft
- Debut: Round 15, 2019, North Melbourne vs. Collingwood, at Marvel Stadium
- Height: 186 cm (6 ft 1 in)
- Weight: 86 kg (190 lb)
- Position: Midfielder

Playing career^{1}
Years	Club	Games (Goals)
2019–2022	North Melbourne	17 (0)
- ^{1} Playing statistics correct to the end of 2022 season.

Kyron Hayden (born 7 June 1999) is a former Australian rules footballer who played for North Melbourne in the Australian Football League (AFL). He played junior football in the West Australian Football League (WAFL) for Subiaco before he was selected in the 2017 AFL draft. Hayden made his AFL debut late in the 2019 season, but ruptured his achilles tendon during the game and missed the remainder of the season. Hayden was knocked to the ground in a collision with Tom Lynch in North Melbourne's Round 7, 2020 game against the Richmond Tigers, with him being stretchered from the playing field. In spite of an initial scare, the collision resulted in only a minor concussion for Hayden.

Hayden was delisted by North Melbourne at the end of the 2022 season, having played a total of 17 AFL games.

== Personal life ==
Hayden is of Aboriginal descent with his father's parents coming from Merredin and Katanning. Hayden’s father spent five years in prison from 2015 to 2020, but despite his sentence Hayden credits his father as a good parent.
