= Sam Walsh (footballer) =

Australian rules football player

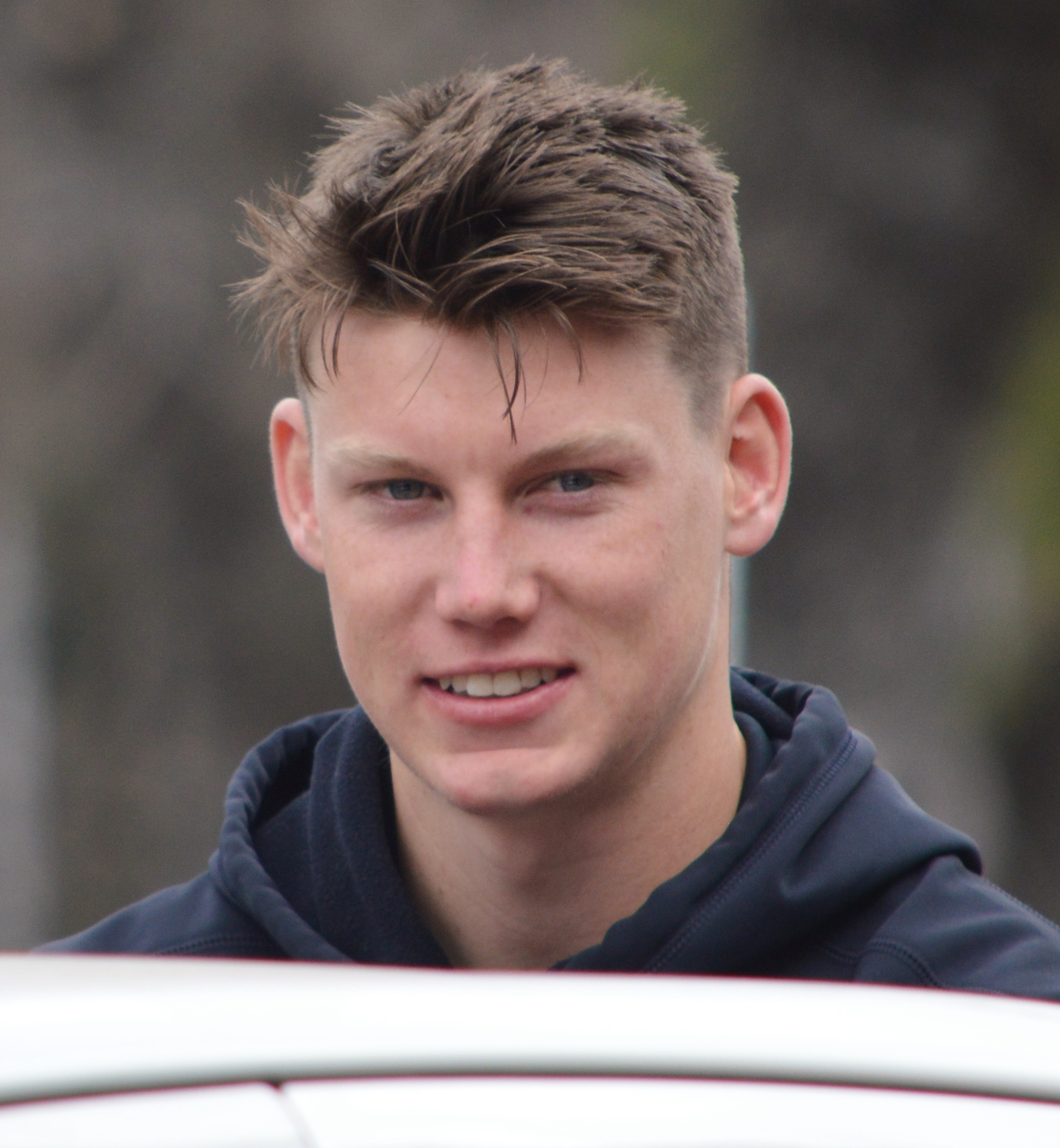
- Walsh in September 2019

Personal information
- Full name: Samuel Peter Walsh
- Nicknames: Worpa, Walshy
- Born: 2 July 2000 (age 26); Victoria
- Original team: Geelong Falcons (TAC Cup)/St Joseph’s(GFNL)/Nightcliff(NTFL)
- Draft: No. 1, 2018 national draft
- Debut: 21 March 2019, Carlton vs. Richmond, at MCG
- Height: 184 cm (6 ft 0 in)
- Weight: 83 kg (183 lb)
- Position: Midfielder

Club information
- Current club: Carlton
- Number: 18

Playing career^{1}
Years	Club	Games (Goals)
2019–	Carlton	158 (55)
- ^{1} Playing statistics correct to the end of the 2026 season.

Career highlights
- Carlton co-vice captain: 2023–; 2× John Nicholls Medal: 2021, 2026; All-Australian team: 2021; Gary Ayres Award : 2023; Ron Evans Medal: 2019; AFLPA best first-year player: 2019; AFLCA best young player award: 2020; 4× 22under22 team: 2019, 2020, 2021 (c), 2022 (vc); AFL Mark of the Year: 2020; Larke Medal: 2018

Samuel Peter Walsh (born 2 July 2000) is a professional Australian rules footballer playing for the Carlton Football Club in the Australian Football League (AFL). He was awarded the 2019 NAB Rising Star Award. He was drafted by Carlton with their first selection which was also the first overall in the 2018 national draft.

== Early life ==
Walsh spent his early years in the Victorian town of Cobden and participated in the local Auskick at Cobden Bombers, where his father coached the senior teams. His family later moved to Darwin, where he would play 12 months a year of football for Nightcliff Tigers in conditions different to anything he had experienced before. He credits this experience for his development as a footballer, he was also selected to represent Northern Territory at under 12 level.

His family returned to Victoria ahead of his secondary schooling, settling in Ocean Grove. Walsh played his junior football for St Joseph’s Football Club and attended St Joseph’s College in Geelong, before playing under-18s football with the Geelong Falcons, in the then-named TAC Cup. He impressed massively and was touted as a sure-fire number 1 draft pick. Sam Walsh averaged an astounding 32 disposals a game as their co-captain, which bolstered his draft stock. Labelled as the 'best pure midfielder in the draft', Walsh also played in the NAB Under 18 Championships, where he represented Vic Country as captain. He amassed an average of 29 disposals in the tournament, and also won the Larke Medal as the best player in the competition.

== AFL career ==
At the 2018 National Draft, Walsh was drafted number 1 by the Carlton Football Club. This was not seen as a surprise to many, who had expected him to be a lock for the first pick. Walsh was given the number 18 and impressed many during pre-season. Sam made his debut in Round 1 of the 2019 AFL season against Richmond at the MCG, where he finished with 24 disposals. He kicked his first goal against Sydney in round 3.

Walsh earned an AFL Rising Star nomination in Round 4, following Carlton's two point loss to Gold Coast, after collecting 28 possessions (13 contested), seven clearances, six tackles and a goal. He also earned a contract extension with the Blues, keeping him at the club until 2022. Sam was awarded with the 2019 AFL rising star.

After a promising season in 2020, which culminated in his finishing second in the Carlton Best and Fairest, Walsh exploded in season 2021, garnering his maiden All Australian selection, his first John Nicholls Medal as the Carlton Football Club Best and Fairest, and finishing fourth in the Brownlow Medal.

In 2020, despite having only had a short career at that point, he was named in the St Joseph’s College team of champions, recognising the best VFL/AFL players to have attended the school.

In February 2022, Walsh signed a 4 year extension to stay with the Blues until at least the end of 2026.

In February 2026, Walsh signed an eight-year contract extension with Carlton to the end of 2034. The deal was the longest and most lucrative in Carlton's history, estimated to be worth over $10 million. At the end of the 2026 season, Walsh won his second John Nicholls Medal.

== Statistics ==
Updated to the end of the 2026 season.

Legend
G	Goals	K	Kicks	D	Disposals	T	Tackles
B	Behinds	H	Handballs	M	Marks

Season	Team	No.	Games	Totals							Averages (per game)							Votes
Season	Team	No.	Games	G	B	K	H	D	M	T	G	B	K	H	D	M	T	Votes
2019	Carlton	18	22	6	13	297	257	554	113	69	0.3	0.6	13.5	11.7	25.2	5.1	3.1	6
2020 (Note: The 2020 season was played with 17 home-and-away matches per team (down from 22) and 16-minute quarters with time on (down from 20-minute quarters with time on) due to the impact of the COVID-19 pandemic.)	Carlton	18	17	8	4	193	156	349	73	47	0.5	0.2	11.4	9.2	20.5	4.3	2.8	8
2021	Carlton	18	22	12	6	298	358	656	127	100	0.5	0.3	13.5	16.3	29.8	5.8	4.5	30
2022	Carlton	18	20	5	7	286	356	642	91	66	0.3	0.4	14.3	17.8	32.1	4.6	3.3	14
2023	Carlton	18	18	6	4	222	291	513	63	87	0.3	0.2	12.3	16.2	28.5	3.5	4.8	5
2024	Carlton	18	20	5	9	268	300	568	60	135	0.3	0.5	13.4	15.0	28.4	3.0	6.8	16
2025	Carlton	18	14	5	5	152	216	368	50	64	0.4	0.4	10.9	15.4	26.3	3.6	4.6	6
2026	Carlton	18	25	8	11	320	407	727	104	102	0.3	0.4	12.8	16.3	29.1	4.2	4.1	14
Career			158	55	59	2036	2341	4377	681	671	0.3	0.4	12.9	14.8	27.7	4.3	4.2	99
