= Zoning (Australian rules football) =

Method of allocating players to clubs

In Australian rules football, zoning (originally called district football, or electorate football in South Australia) refers to a system whereby a given area, either region or lower-level football league, is reserved exclusively for one club.

Zoning has been historically an important part of most major Australian football leagues, being usually justified as necessary to ensure a reasonably equitable competition.

== Metropolitan zoning ==
In the early years of Australian rules football, players, though required to be amateurs, were free agents.

Problems later arose as a small number of clubs (i.e. Carlton, Geelong, South Melbourne and later Essendon in the VFA, Norwood, Port Adelaide and South Adelaide in the SAFA, and Fremantle in the WAFA) perennially dominated the competition, leaving considerable pressure on the leagues to eliminate this inequality to retain interest.

District football was first introduced in the SAFA in 1897, with compulsory district qualification from 1899. Under district football, a player could only play for the club whose district he resided in.

The effect on the competitiveness of the SAFA was noteworthy: between 1877 and 1899, Norwood, South Adelaide and Port Adelaide won 22 of the 24 premierships, including several sequences of successive premierships (for instance, South Adelaide had won six of the last eight premierships to 1899, while Norwood had won 11 premierships in their first 17 years, including sequences of six and three in succession). In the years between 1900 and 1912, two teams who had previously been perennially close to or at the bottom of the ladder won premierships: North Adelaide in 1900, 1902, and 1905, and West Adelaide in 1908–1909 and 1911–1912 (four premierships in five years).

The VFL formally adopted metropolitan zoning for the 1915 season under laws which required a player to play for the club in the zone he lived in unless he:

- a) moved home after becoming an established player for three years, or
- b) was discarded by the club to which he was zoned.

Metropolitan zoning has been seen by historians of the VFL as improving the competitive balance of the league in the years following World War I. When Footscray, Hawthorn and North Melbourne were admitted for the 1925 season, they were allocated zones. Over time, boundaries were changed to cope with demographic shifts.

Whilst recent studies have shown that metropolitan zoning became less effective at equalising playing strength following the admittance of the three new clubs in 1925, it was already firmly accepted by the majority of club officials in most Australian rules competitions by the late 1920s, and at no stage during the following forty years was there ever any thought of abolishing it, while a tradition of club loyalty further entrenched the viewpoint that zoning was a legitimate policy.

With the great urban sprawl after World War II, newly developed areas were zoned almost as soon as they were developed. In the case of the VFL, such areas were quite often zoned to a different club from the one who held adjacent previously developed areas, whereas the SANFL tried to keep zones contiguous. These and other leagues remained concerned about the possible impacts if zoning were removed, and this caused their zoning laws to ossify.

== Country zoning ==
In the early years of Australian Rules football, metropolitan clubs were unable to buy players from rural leagues. The growth of Melbourne, Adelaide and Perth due to urbanization in the 1950s meant that city clubs could offer much more money (even if not as direct payments) than country clubs could. This permitted wealthier clubs to circumvent the restrictions imposed by metropolitan zoning, as top country players tended to go to the club that was able to offer them most money gifts such as motor cars and signing-on fees.

From the mid-1960s, Carlton, Collingwood, Essendon, Richmond (and to a lesser extent Geelong) perennially dominated the competition because their greater wealth allowed them to monopolise top country players and build up greater playing strength than was previously possible, while Footscray, North Melbourne and Fitzroy were left in grave danger of folding.

The VFL's response was to zone rural Victoria and the Riverina of New South Wales in a similar manner to metropolitan Melbourne. Because of the sparseness of Australia's rural population, the country zones related not to the player’s address, but rather to the league in which he played.

This difference made zone boundaries effectively impossible to adjust, and was a critical component of the failure of country zoning: the VFL was aware that discrepancies existed in the strength of each zone, and it was originally planned that the zones would be rotated every year so that each club would obtain a chance of receiving the best young country players.

However, Carlton and Hawthorn both lodged official complaints with the VFL, as they had productive zones and were naturally unwilling to give them up for less productive ones; Thus, the zones remained the same from the inception of country zoning until it was abolished in 1986. There was also no provision for demographic changes that occurred in the various country zones, which exacerbated the problems mentioned above.

=== Major Country Leagues and their allocated clubs ===
- Bendigo Football League to Carlton
- Western Border Football League to Collingwood
- Wimmera Football League to Essendon
- Hampden Football League to Fitzroy
- Gippsland Football League and Latrobe Valley Football League to Footscray
- Geelong & District Football League, Murray Football League and Mid Murray Football League to Geelong
- Mornington Peninsula Football League and West Gippsland Football League to Hawthorn
- Goulburn Valley Football League and Riddell District Football League to Melbourne
- Ovens & Murray Football League, Ovens & King Football League, Tallangatta & District Football League to North Melbourne
- Sunraysia Football League to Richmond
- Riverina Football League to South Melbourne
- Ballarat Football League to St Kilda

=== Effects of country zoning ===
Although the more even distribution of top country players at the beginning of the 1970s was such that the SANFL and WAFL quickly adopted country zoning, its gains were very short-lived.

Carlton, Richmond, Hawthorn and North Melbourne won every VFL premiership between 1967 and 1983, a period of dominance not known in any other era, as strong country zones gave these clubs lists more powerful than any club could build without zoning.

In contrast, the clubs with the worst zones, Melbourne and South Melbourne, took eight wooden spoons between them in that period. South Melbourne played only two finals in 1970 and 1977, whilst Melbourne did not play a final until 1987, after country zoning had been abolished.

Some writers on VFL history have argued that the inequalities created by country zoning were much greater than those created by club wealth beforehand and that some clubs lost many players they would have gained were players able to move to the club nearest to them. Most significantly, St Kilda's return to being perennially close to or on the bottom of the ladder in the mid-1970s after a period of success from 1961 to 1973 has been related to its loss of many players to Hawthorn from the Frankston area, which was already becoming part of metropolitan Melbourne when country zoning began.

Defenders of country zoning have argued that it provided greater incentive for VFL clubs to look for players in country leagues, and that its abolition has meant that this incentive has been lost.

== End of VFL zoning ==
In 1981, the system of player permits based on country and metropolitan zoning was threatened by two cases.

In the better-known of these, a full-back from SANFL club West Torrens, Doug Cox, had his permit to play with St Kilda challenged because he had played in 1975 for South Mildura, which was within Richmond's country zone. St Kilda temporarily lost eight points for two wins against Footscray and Melbourne, later reinstated on appeal, and was fined $5,000 for playing Cox in the first eight rounds. Soon afterward, South Melbourne centre-half forward Michael Smith admitted he gave false information on his application for a permit to play with South, and his true address was in St Kilda's zone. South was going to lose four points but since the VFL, challenged by the Cox case to be more lenient about its now-archaic zoning laws, was considering changing the rules, South was not punished.

The Foschini Case of 1983, where teenage rover/forward, Silvio Foschini did not want to move to Sydney when South Melbourne did so in 1981/1982 but was refused a clearance to play with St Kilda, declared previously unchallenged zoning an illegal labour market restraint. Although the VFL retained zoning for two more years, it had to radically alter the system of clearances and player contracts, and in 1985, with the competition less competitive than ever (only six clubs had made the Grand Final since 1972), reform of the system of player trading began. Zoning was replaced with a player draft, which studies have shown to be much more effective at equalising club strength than country zoning ever was.

In competitions such as the SANFL and WAFL, however, country and metropolitan zoning are still used today, despite the declarations concerning their use in the VFL. The SANFL, which introduced country zoning in South Australia in 1973 has made efforts to make country zoning less inflexible than it proved in the VFL through making provisions for the adjustment of zone boundaries. In the WAFL, however, there is already a distinct concern country zoning is creating inequalities in available talent.

== Next Generation Academies ==
In 2010, the AFL set up four junior development academies, two each in Queensland and New South Wales, which were run by the AFL clubs based in those states (Brisbane Lions, Gold Coast, Greater Western Sydney and Sydney). The academies were designed to aid the development of junior footballers from the states traditionally dominated by rugby league. The AFL club which ran each academy was afforded priority access (but not exclusive access) to draft graduates from their academies, providing a direct incentive for those AFL clubs to invest in junior development which would not otherwise have existed under the draft.

Through 2015, the AFL developed a plan to enable all AFL clubs to establish similar academies, known as 'Next Generation Academies', with each club allocated a zone and juniors qualifying residentially. This was designed to give all clubs an incentive to invest directly in junior development, particularly focussing on diverse and Indigenous backgrounds. As with the northern clubs' academies, a club will have the ability to draft its academy's graduates with a discounted draft pick, but will not have exclusive recruitment rights. In February 2016, the AFL announced the allocation of Victorian, Tasmanian and Northern Territorian zones amongst the ten Victorian clubs; unlike historical zones, not all clubs were given both a metropolitan and a country zone, with most clubs receiving either one or the other. North Melbourne was designated Tasmania at large.

South Australian and Western Australian AFL clubs (Adelaide, Port Adelaide, Fremantle and West Coast) were designated SANFL and WAFL clubs and their respective country and metropolitan zones.

In 2017, Greater Western Sydney's academy rules were changed for its Albury, Riverina and Sunraysia zones in southern New South Wales, the club only has access to Indigenous and multicultural players in these zones.

AFL team	Zones	Under-18s affiliate
Adelaide	Salisbury and Playford, South-western Adelaide, Northern Adelaide, South-eastern Adelaide (SA metro); Gawler and Barossa Valley, Limestone Coast and South East, Mid North, Flinders Ranges, Whyalla, Adelaide Hills, Murraylands (SA country); APY Lands – East (Kenmore, Fregon, Mimili and Indulkana)	Central District; Glenelg; North Adelaide; Sturt
Carlton	Northern Melbourne (Vic metro)	Northern Knights
Collingwood	Central Melbourne (Vic metro); Tennant Creek and Barkly Region (NT)	Oakleigh Chargers
Essendon	North-western Melbourne (Vic metro); West Arnhem and Tiwi Islands (NT)	Calder Cannons
Fremantle	Claremont, Cottesloe and Nedlands, South-western Perth, Southern Perth, Fremantle, Rockingham, Joondalup and Northern Perth (WA metro); Geraldton and Mid West, Gascoyne, Mandurah and Peel region, Wheatbelt, Kimberley (WA country)	Claremont; East Fremantle; Peel Thunder; South Fremantle; West Perth
Geelong	Geelong, Bellarine Peninsula and Barwon South West region (Vic country); East Arnhem (NT)	Geelong Falcons
Greater Western Sydney	Albury, Riverina, Sunraysia (NSW country)	Bendigo Pioneers; Murray Bushrangers
Hawthorn	Eastern Melbourne and Whitehorse region (Vic metro); Gippsland (Vic country); Katherine region (NT)	Eastern Ranges; Gippsland Power
Melbourne	Dandenong and South-eastern Melbourne (Vic metro); Mornington Peninsula (Vic country); Alice Springs (NT)	Dandenong Stingrays
North Melbourne	Melbourne CBD and Werribee (Vic metro); Tasmania at-large	Calder Cannons; Western Jets; Tasmania Devils
Port Adelaide	North-eastern Adelaide, Outer southern Adelaide, Western Adelaide, Lefevre Peninsula (SA metro); Eyre Peninsula, Nullarbor Plain, Fleurieu Peninsula, Kangaroo Island, Riverland, Far North, Clare Valley, Adelaide Plains, Yorke Peninsula (SA country); APY Lands – West (Ernabella, Amata, Murputja and Pipalyatjara)	Norwood; South Adelaide; West Adelaide; Woodville-West Torrens
Richmond	Goulburn, Sunraysia, Bendigo, Mallee, Hume and North Central (Vic country)	Bendigo Pioneers; Murray Bushrangers
St Kilda	Inner southern and Bayside Melbourne (Vic metro); Frankston local government areas (Vic country)	Sandringham Dragons
West Coast	Eastern Perth, South-eastern Perth, Western Perth, Swan Valley and North-eastern Perth (WA metro); Bunbury, South West, Great Southern, Goldfields-Esperance, Pilbara (WA country)	East Perth; Perth; Subiaco; Swan Districts
Western Bulldogs	Western Melbourne (Vic metro); Wimmera, Grampians, Ballarat and Goldfields region (Vic country)	Western Jets; Greater Western Victoria Rebels

== Northern Academy Zones ==
New South Wales and Queensland based teams (Greater Western Sydney, Sydney, Brisbane Lions and Gold Coast) are based north-east of the Barassi Line, to help develop the game in regions with minimal AFL presence, they were designated with Academy zones to develop players from these regions

In 2019, Gold Coast were designated with the Darwin region as part of their "rescue package" announced by the AFL

AFL team	Zones
Brisbane Lions	Brisbane (Logan, Brisbane, Ipswich, Moreton Local Government Areas), Sunshine Coast, Darling Downs, Wide Bay-Burnett, Outback Queensland
Gold Coast	Gold Coast region, Northern Queensland (Cairns, Townsville, Rockhampton, Mackay, Mt. Isa, Cape York), Northern Rivers region (NSW), Darwin region (NT)
Greater Western Sydney	Greater Western Sydney, Macarthur and South Western Sydney, the Blue Mountains, Canberra and the ACT, southern and western New South Wales
Sydney	Central Sydney, Southern Sydney, North Shore and Northern Beaches, Central Coast, Newcastle and the Hunter Valley, New England, Wollongong and the Illawarra region
