= 2019 Richmond Football Club season =

Football club

Richmond Football Club
2019 season
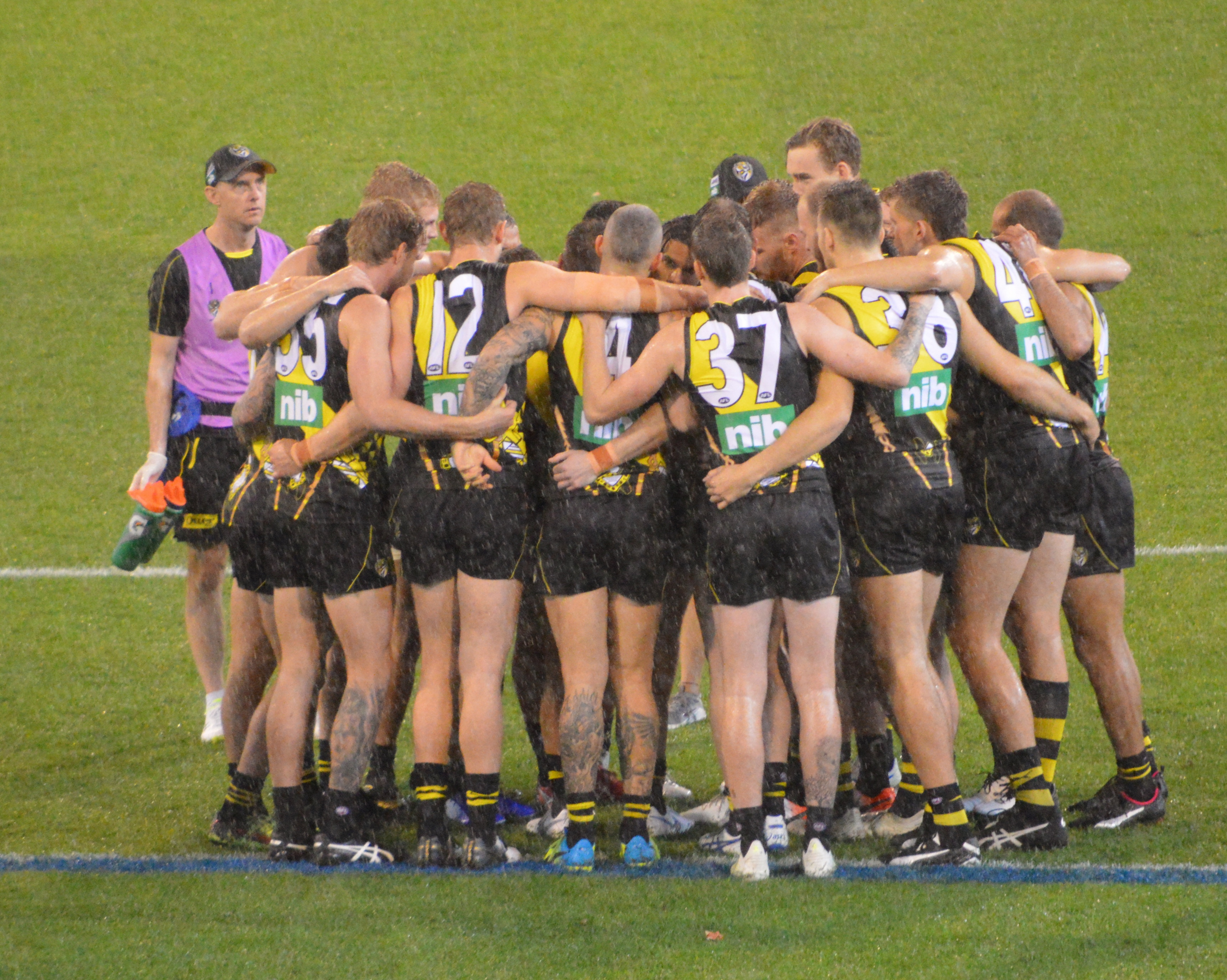
- Richmond's AFL team during the round 10, Dreamtime at the 'G match in May 2019
- President: Peggy O'Neal^{(6th season)}
- Coach: Damien Hardwick^{(10th season)}
- Captains: Trent Cotchin^{(7th season)}
- Home ground: MCG
- Pre-season: (2-0)
- AFL season: 3rd^{16-6}
- Finals series: 1st^{(3-0)}
- Best and fairest: Dion Prestia
- Leading goalkicker: Tom Lynch^{(63)}
- Highest home attendance: 80,176^{(Round 10 vs. Essendon)}
- Lowest home attendance: 38,986^{(Round 17 vs. Greater Western Sydney)}
- Average home attendance: 59,987^{(▼1,188 / ▼1.94%)}
- Club membership: 103,358^{(▲2,632 / ▲2.61%)}

The 2019 season was the 112th season in which the Richmond Football Club participated in the VFL/AFL. The season ended with the club winning its 12th league premiership.

== 2018 off-season list changes ==
=== Retirements and delistings ===
| Player | Reason | Club games | Career games | Ref |
|---|---|---|---|---|
| Shaun Hampson | Retired | 35 | 98 | |
| Jacob Townsend | Re-rookied | 19 | 47 | |
| Nathan Drummond | Delisted | 5 | 5 | |
| Mabior Chol | Re-rookied | 1 | 1 | |

=== Free agency ===
| Date | Player | Free agent type | Former club | New club | Compensation | Ref |
|---|---|---|---|---|---|---|
| 5 October | Reece Conca | Unrestricted | Richmond | Fremantle | 2nd round^{[a]} | |
| 8 October | Tom Lynch | Restricted | Gold Coast | Richmond | 1st round | |

- ^{a} Richmond received an end of second round compensation pick for Reece Conca, however this pick was later withdrawn due to signing Tom Lynch

=== Trades ===
| Date | Gained | Lost | Trade partner | Ref |
|---|---|---|---|---|
| 8 October | 2019 3rd round pick | Anthony Miles | Gold Coast | |
| 8 October | 2019 3rd round pick | Corey Ellis | Gold Coast | |
| 8 October | 2019 3rd round pick | 2019 3rd round pick | Gold Coast | |
| 15 October | Pick 64 | Sam Lloyd | Western Bulldogs | |
| 16 October | Pick 68 | Tyson Stengle | Adelaide | |

=== National draft ===
| Round | Overall pick | Player | State | Position | Team from | League from | Ref |
|---|---|---|---|---|---|---|---|
| 1 | 20 | Riley Collier-Dawkins | VIC | Midfielder | Oakleigh Chargers | TAC Cup | |
| 2 | 43 | Jack Ross | VIC | Midfielder | Oakleigh Chargers | TAC Cup | |
| 4 | 58 | Fraser Turner | TAS | Wing | Clarence | TSL | |
| 4 | 62 | Luke English | WA | Midfielder | Perth | WAFL | |

=== Rookie draft ===
| Round | Overall pick | Player | State | Position | Team from | League from | Ref |
|---|---|---|---|---|---|---|---|
| 1 | 16 | Jake Aarts | VIC | Small forward | Richmond reserves | VFL | |
| 2 | 32 | Jacob Townsend | VIC | Midfielder / forward | Richmond | AFL | |
| 3 | 45 | Mabior Chol | VIC | Key forward | Richmond | AFL | |

=== Pre-season supplemental selection period ===
| Date | Player | Team from | League from | Ref |
|---|---|---|---|---|
| 21 November 2018 | Mav Weller | St Kilda | AFL | |
| 11 February 2019 | Sydney Stack | Perth | WAFL | |

=== Mid-season draft ===
| Pick | Player | Position | Team from | League from | Ref |
|---|---|---|---|---|---|
| 13 | Marlion Pickett | Midfielder | South Fremantle | WAFL | |

== 2019 squad ==
Richmond Football Club
| Senior list | | Rookie list | Coaching staff |
|---|---|---|---|
| 1 Nick Vlastuin; 2 Dylan Grimes; 3 Dion Prestia; 4 Dustin Martin; 5 Brandon Ellis; 6 Shaun Grigg; 7 Dan Butler; 8 Jack Riewoldt (vc); 9 Trent Cotchin (c); 10 Shane Edwards; 11 Jason Castagna; 12 David Astbury; 13 Jack Higgins; 14 Bachar Houli; 15 Jayden Short; 17 Daniel Rioli; 18 Alex Rance (vc); 19 Tom Lynch; 22 Josh Caddy | 23 Kane Lambert; 25 Toby Nankervis; 26 Riley Collier-Dawkins; 27 Jack Ross; 28 Fraser Turner; 29 Shai Bolton; 31 Oleg Markov; 32 Luke English; 33 Kamdyn McIntosh; 34 Jack Graham; 35 Nathan Broad; 36 Callum Moore; 37 Connor Menadue; 38 Noah Balta; 40 Callum Coleman-Jones; 42 Ryan Garthwaite; 45 Patrick Naish; 46 Ben Miller; 47 Ivan Soldo | 16 Mav Weller; 21 Jacob Townsend; 39 Jake Aarts; 41 Mabior Chol; 43 Derek Eggmolesse-Smith (B); 44 Sydney Stack; 48 Liam Baker; 50 Marlion Pickett | Head coach: Damien Hardwick; Assistant coaches: Blake Caracella (offensive); Andrew McQualter (forwards); Justin Leppitsch (defence); Adam Kingsley (midfield stoppage); Ivan Maric (ruck); Xavier Clarke (development/VFL midfield); Ryan Ferguson (development/VFL defence); Craig McRae (VFL coach/development); Legend: (c) Captain(s); (vc) Vice-captain(s); (B) Category B rookie; Upgraded Cat-B rookie; Updated: 21 October 2026; Source(s): Senior list, Rookie list, Coaching staff |

== 2019 season ==
=== Pre-season ===
==== JLT Community Series ====
| Match | Date | Score | Opponent | Opponent's score | Result | Home/away | Venue | Attendance |
|---|---|---|---|---|---|---|---|---|
| 1 | Sunday 3 March, 4:40pm | 16.17 (113) | Melbourne | 16.5 (101) | Won by 12 points | Home | Deakin Reserve, Shepparton | 5,190 |
| 2 | Saturday 9 March, 7:10pm | 14.11 (95) | Hawthorn | 13.9 (87) | Won by 8 points | Away | University of Tasmania Stadium, Launceston | 6,982 |

=== Home and away season ===
| Round | Date | Score | Opponent | Opponent's score | Result | Home/away | Venue | Attendance | Ladder |
|---|---|---|---|---|---|---|---|---|---|
| 1 | Thursday 21 March, 7:20pm | 14.13 (97) | Carlton | 9.10 (64) | Won by 33 points | Away | MCG | 85,016 | 5th |
| 2 | Thursday 28 March, 7:20pm | 10.6 (66) | Collingwood | 17.8 (110) | Lost by 44 points | Home | MCG | 70,699 | 13th |
| 3 | Saturday 6 April, 4:35pm | 10.16 (76) | Greater Western Sydney | 19.11 (125) | Lost by 49 points | Away | Spotless Stadium | 12,697 | 14th |
| 4 | Saturday 13 April, 4:05pm | 15.9 (99) | Port Adelaide | 14.8 (92) | Won by 7 points | Away | Adelaide Oval | 38,864 | 13th |
| 5 | Saturday 20 April 7:25pm | 13.11 (89) | Sydney | 10.7 (67) | Won by 22 points | Home | Marvel Stadium | 40,053 | 10th |
| 6 | Wednesday 24 April, 7:35pm | 12.13 (85) | Melbourne | 6.6 (42) | Won by 43 points | Home | MCG | 72,704 | 8th |
| 7 | Saturday 4 May, 7:25pm | 7.10 (52) | Western Bulldogs | 15.9 (99) | Lost by 47 points | Away | Marvel Stadium | 36,151 | 9th |
| 8 | Sunday 12 May, 3:20pm | 17.9 (111) | Fremantle | 12.14 (86) | Won by 25 points | Away | Optus Stadium | 42,641 | 6th |
| 9 | Sunday 19 May, 3:20pm | 14.11 (95) | Hawthorn | 8.11 (59) | Won by 36 points | Home | MCG | 64,936 | 5th |
| 10 | Saturday 25 May, 7:25pm | 10.13 (73) | Essendon | 6.14 (50) | Won by 23 points | Home | MCG | 80,176 | 4th |
| 11 | Friday 31 May, 7:50pm | 9.8 (62) | North Melbourne | 15.9 (99) | Lost by 37 points | Away | Marvel Stadium | 29,326 | 6th |
| 12 | Friday 7 June, 7:50pm | 5.7 (37) | Geelong | 16.8 (104) | Lost by 71 points | Home | MCG | 65,214 | 7th |
| 13 | Thursday 13 June, 7:20pm | 9.14 (68) | Adelaide | 15.11 (101) | Lost by 33 points | Away | Adelaide Oval | 40,837 | 8th |
| 14 | BYE | | | | | | | | 9th |
| 15 | Sunday 30 June, 1:10pm | 16.7 (103) | St Kilda | 10.10 (70) | Won by 33 points | Away | Marvel Stadium | 40,962 | 7th |
| 16 | Saturday 6 July, 2:10pm | 23.12 (150) | Gold Coast | 9.4 (58) | Won by 92 points | Away | Metricon Stadium | 16,031 | 6th |
| 17 | Sunday 14 July, 1:10pm | 13.16 (94) | Greater Western Sydney | 9.13 (67) | Won by 27 points | Home | MCG | 38,986 | 5th |
| 18 | Saturday 20 July, 1:45pm | 15.11 (101) | Port Adelaide | 9.9 (63) | Won by 38 points | Home | MCG | 41,642 | 5th |
| 19 | Friday 26 July, 7:50pm | 14.14 (98) | Collingwood | 9.12 (66) | Won by 32 points | Away | MCG | 78,722 | 4th |
| 20 | Saturday 3 August, 7:25pm | 13.15 (93) | Melbourne | 9.6 (60) | Won by 33 points | Away | MCG | 37,254 | 4th |
| 21 | Sunday 11 August, 3:20pm | 11.7 (73) | Carlton | 6.9 (45) | Won by 28 points | Home | MCG | 51,039 | 4th |
| 22 | Sunday 18 August, 1:10pm | 13.10 (88) | West Coast | 13.4 (82) | Won by 6 points | Home | MCG | 57,415 | 4th |
| 23 | Sunday 25 August, 3:20pm | 12.10 (82) | Brisbane Lions | 8.7 (55) | Won by 27 points | Home | MCG | 76,995 | 3rd |

=== Finals ===
| Match | Date | Score | Opponent | Opponent's Score | Result | Home/Away | Venue | Attendance |
|---|---|---|---|---|---|---|---|---|
| Qualifying final | Saturday 7 September, 7:25pm | 18.4 (112) | Brisbane Lions | 8.17 (65) | Won by 47 points | Away | The Gabba | 37,478 |
| Preliminary final | Friday 20 September, 7:50pm | 12.13 (85) | Geelong | 9.12 (66) | Won by 19 points | Home | MCG | 94,423 |
| Grand final | Saturday 28 September, 2:30pm | 17.12 (114) | Greater Western Sydney | 3.7 (25) | Won by 89 points | Home | MCG | 100,014 |

== Ladder ==
| Pos | Team | Pld | W | L | D | PF | PA | PP | Pts | Qualification |
|---|---|---|---|---|---|---|---|---|---|---|
| 1 | Geelong | 22 | 16 | 6 | 0 | 1984 | 1462 | 135.7 | 64 | Finals series |
| 2 | Brisbane Lions | 22 | 16 | 6 | 0 | 2004 | 1694 | 118.3 | 64 | Finals series |
| 3 | Richmond (P) | 22 | 16 | 6 | 0 | 1892 | 1664 | 113.7 | 64 | Finals series |
| 4 | Collingwood | 22 | 15 | 7 | 0 | 1885 | 1601 | 117.7 | 60 | Finals series |
| 5 | West Coast | 22 | 15 | 7 | 0 | 1902 | 1691 | 112.5 | 60 | Finals series |
| 6 | Greater Western Sydney | 22 | 13 | 9 | 0 | 1926 | 1669 | 115.4 | 52 | Finals series |
| 7 | Western Bulldogs | 22 | 12 | 10 | 0 | 1941 | 1810 | 107.2 | 48 | Finals series |
| 8 | Essendon | 22 | 12 | 10 | 0 | 1702 | 1784 | 95.4 | 48 | Finals series |
| 9 | Hawthorn | 22 | 11 | 11 | 0 | 1742 | 1602 | 108.7 | 44 | |
| 10 | Port Adelaide | 22 | 11 | 11 | 0 | 1806 | 1714 | 105.4 | 44 | |
| 11 | Adelaide | 22 | 10 | 12 | 0 | 1776 | 1761 | 100.9 | 40 | |
| 12 | North Melbourne | 22 | 10 | 12 | 0 | 1824 | 1834 | 99.5 | 40 | |
| 13 | Fremantle | 22 | 9 | 13 | 0 | 1579 | 1718 | 91.9 | 36 | |
| 14 | St Kilda | 22 | 9 | 13 | 0 | 1645 | 1961 | 83.9 | 36 | |
| 15 | Sydney | 22 | 8 | 14 | 0 | 1706 | 1746 | 97.7 | 32 | |
| 16 | Carlton | 22 | 7 | 15 | 0 | 1609 | 1905 | 84.5 | 28 | |
| 17 | Melbourne | 22 | 5 | 17 | 0 | 1569 | 1995 | 78.6 | 20 | |
| 18 | Gold Coast | 22 | 3 | 19 | 0 | 1351 | 2232 | 60.5 | 12 | |

Source: AFL Tables
Rules for classification: 1) points; 2) percentage; 3) number of points for.
(P) Premiers

== Awards ==
=== League awards ===
==== All-Australian team ====
| | Player | Position | Appearance |
|---|---|---|---|
| Named | Dylan Grimes | Back pocket | 1st |
| Named | Bachar Houli | Half back | 1st |
| Nominated | Dustin Martin | - | - |
| Nominated | Dion Prestia | - | - |

==== Brownlow Medal tally ====
| Player | 3 vote games | 2 vote games | 1 vote games | Total votes | Place |
|---|---|---|---|---|---|
| Dustin Martin | 7 | 0 | 2 | 23 | 6th |
| Bachar Houli | 1 | 3 | 2 | 11 | 32nd |
| Dion Prestia | 1 | 2 | 1 | 8 | 46th |
| Trent Cotchin | 2 | 0 | 0 | 6 | 59th |
| Shai Bolton | 1 | 1 | 0 | 5 | 70th |
| Nick Vlastuin | 1 | 0 | 1 | 4 | 90th |
| Kane Lambert | 0 | 1 | 2 | 4 | 90th |
| Dylan Grimes | 1 | 0 | 0 | 3 | 104th |
| Tom Lynch | 0 | 1 | 1 | 3 | 104th |
| Jason Castagna | 0 | 1 | 0 | 2 | 128th |
| Toby Nankervis | 0 | 0 | 1 | 1 | 156th |
| Jack Graham | 0 | 0 | 1 | 1 | 156th |
| Mabior Chol | 0 | 0 | 1 | 1 | 156th |
| Total | 14 | 9 | 12 | 72 | - |

==== Rising Star ====
Nominations:

| Round | Player | Placing | Ref |
|---|---|---|---|
| 10 | Liam Baker | 9th | |
| 11 | Sydney Stack | 3rd | |
| 17 | Shai Bolton | - | |

==== 22 Under 22 team ====
| | Player | Position | Appearance |
|---|---|---|---|
| Named | Sydney Stack | Back pocket | 1st |
| Nominated | Shai Bolton | – | – |

=== Club awards ===
==== Jack Dyer Medal ====
| Position | Player | Votes | Medal |
|---|---|---|---|
| 1st | Dion Prestia | 91 | Jack Dyer Medal |
| 2nd | Shane Edwards | 79 | Jack Titus Medal |
| 3rd | Dylan Grimes | 75 | Maurie Fleming Medal |
| 4th | Nick Vlastuin | 70 | Fred Swift Medal |
| 5th | Tom Lynch | 69 | Kevin Bartlett Medal |
| 6th | Dustin Martin | 67 | |
| 7th | Bachar Houli | 64 | |
| 8th | Kane Lambert | 63 | |
| 9th | David Astbury | 55 | |
| 10th | Jason Castagna | 47 | |
| 10th | Daniel Rioli | 47 | |

==== Michael Roach Medal ====
| Position | Player | Goals |
|---|---|---|
| 1st | Tom Lynch | 63 |
| 2nd | Dustin Martin | 32 |
| 3rd | Jason Castagna | 27 |
| 4th | Jack Riewoldt | 24 |
| 5th | Kane Lambert | 18 |

== Reserves ==
The 2019 season marked the sixth consecutive year the Richmond Football club ran a stand-alone reserves team in the Victorian Football League (VFL). Richmond senior and rookie-listed players who were not selected to play in the AFL side were eligible to play for the team alongside a small squad of VFL-only listed players. The team was captained by former AFL-listed defender Steve Morris. The team finished the home and away season with 16 wins and two losses, winning a second straight minor premiership. Finals wins over Essendon and Port Melbourne earned them a spot in the grand final, where they defeated Williamstown to win the club's first VFA/VFL premiership in 114 years and the club's first reserves grade premiership since 1997. AFL-listed midfielder Marlion Pickett won the Norm Goss Memorial Medal as the best on ground that day.

VFL listed defender Daniel Coffield won the team's best and fairest award while three players tied for the goal kicking award (21 goals), Jacob Townsend, Dan Butler and Mabior Chol.

=== Playing squad ===
Richmond Football Club (reserves)
| Playing list | | Development list | Coaching staff |
|---|---|---|---|
| 51 Steve Morris (c); 52 Shaun Mannagh; 53 Hugh Beasley; 54 Jacob Ballard; 55 Lachlan Street; 55 Blake Grewar; 57 Nathan Oakes; 58 Chad Harris; 59 Lachie Haysman; 60 Charlie Thompson; 61 James Fletcher; 62 Luke Nelson | 64 Thomas Silvestro; 65 Joel Cusack; 67 Brenton Credlin; 68 Connor Riley; 69 Lewis Diggins; 71 Nick Baltas; 72 Bailey Lambert; 73 Joel Ernest; 74 Rueben Hayward; 75 Hayden Bruce; 78 Daniel Coffield; 79 Billy Coates | 63 Angus Hicks; 74 Bailey Henderson; 75 Alistair Richards; 78 Finlay Bayne; 79 Michael Caven | Head coach: Craig McRae; Assistant coaches: Paul Griffiths (forwards); Xavier Clarke (midfield); Ryan Ferguson (backline); Legend: (c) Captain(s); (vc) Vice-captain(s); Updated: 21 October 2026; Source(s): Playing list, Coaching staff |

== Women's team ==
The 2019 season was the second year the Richmond Football Club ran a team in the VFL Women's competition (VFLW). The team finished the season with nine wins and five losses, placing 4th on the ladder of 13 teams and earning a finals berth. There they were eliminated in a loss to the Western Bulldogs. AFLW-listed midfielder Monique Conti won the club's best and fairest award. Conti also was runner's up in the league best and fairest award.

=== Playing squad ===
Richmond Football Club (VFLW)
| Playing list | | Coaching staff |
|---|---|---|
| 1 Jess Kennedy (c); 2 Phoebe Monahan; 3 Katie Brennan; 4 Monique Conti; 5 Maddy Brancatisano; 7 Lauren Tesoriero; 8 Jacqueline Graham; 9 Hannah Burchell; 11 Alice Edmonds; 12 Laura Bailey; 13 Alana Woodward; 14 Sabrina Frederick; 15 Rebecca Miller; 16 Courtney Wakefield; 17 Emma Gunn; 18 Lisa Davie; 19 Kate Dempsey; 20 Hannah McLaren; 22 Shayla Marsh; 23 Tamara Smith | 24 Tayla Stahl-Smith; 25 Grace Egan; 26 Evelyn Burry; 28 Gabrielle Seymour; 29 Kodi Jacques; 30 Dalia Edward; 32 Imogen Milford; 33 Jenna Colwell; 34 Akec Makur Chuot; 35 Natarsha Bamblett; 36 Emily Paterno; 37 Millie Kilngbeil; 39 Mel Lindsay; 41 Sarah Last; 43 Grace Campbell; 45 Rachel Poke; 46 Hannah Ibrahim; 52 Maddy Baldwin; 54 Jordyn Jolliffe | Head coach: Tom Hunter; Legend: (c) Captain(s); (vc) Vice-captain(s); Updated: 10 May 2019; Source(s): List |
