= Sam Simpson (footballer) =

Australian rules footballer (born 1998)

Personal information
- Full name: Sam Simpson
- Born: 14 June 1998 (age 28)
- Original team: Geelong Falcons (TAC Cup)
- Draft: No. 53 (F/S), 2017 rookie draft
- Debut: Round 15, 2017, Geelong vs. Greater Western Sydney, at Spotless Stadium
- Height: 180 cm (5 ft 11 in)
- Weight: 74 kg (163 lb)
- Position: Forward

Club information
- Current club: Geelong
- Number: 37

Playing career^{1}
Years	Club	Games (Goals)
2017–2023	Geelong	25 (14)
- ^{1} Playing statistics correct to the end of 2023.

Sam Simpson (born 14 June 1998) is a professional Australian rules footballer who last played for the Geelong Football Club in the Australian Football League (AFL). The son of former Geelong player, Sean Simpson, he was drafted by Geelong with their fourth selection and fifty-third overall in the 2017 rookie draft under the father–son rule. He made his debut in the draw against Greater Western Sydney at Spotless Stadium in round fifteen of the 2017 season.

== Playing career ==
Simpson played for Geelong in the 2020 AFL Grand Final against Richmond, but was forced from the field in the final with a concussion after colliding with teammate Sam Menegola. He would miss large parts of the 2021 AFL season through injury, returning to the squad late in the season, only to suffer another concussion in the qualifying final against Port Adelaide.

Simpson missed the entire 2022 AFL season due to a number of injuries, returning to the Geelong team for the first time in 603 days in round 6 of the 2023 AFL season. He would kick the first goal of his return match against Sydney.

Simpson was delisted by Geelong at the conclusion of the 2023 season.

== Statistics ==
Updated to the end of the 2022 season.

Legend
G	Goals	K	Kicks	D	Disposals	T	Tackles
B	Behinds	H	Handballs	M	Marks

Season	Team	No.	Games	Totals							Averages (per game)						
Season	Team	No.	Games	G	B	K	H	D	M	T	G	B	K	H	D	M	T
2017	Geelong	37	5	2	1	26	30	56	12	5	0.4	0.2	5.2	6.0	11.2	2.4	1.0
2018	Geelong	37	1	0	0	3	4	7	3	2	0.0	0.0	3.0	4.0	7.0	3.0	2.0
2019	Geelong	37	0	–	–	–	–	–	–	–	–	–	–	–	–	–	–
2020 (Note: The 2020 season was played with 17 home-and-away matches per team (down from 22) and 16-minute quarters with time on (down from 20-minute quarters with time on) due to the impact of the COVID-19 pandemic.)	Geelong	37	9	3	2	60	65	125	23	28	0.3	0.2	6.7	7.2	13.9	2.6	3.1
2021	Geelong	37	4	2	2	28	25	53	13	8	0.5	0.5	7.0	6.3	13.3	3.3	2.0
2022	Geelong	37	0	–	–	–	–	–	–	–	–	–	–	–	–	–	–
Career			19	7	5	117	124	241	51	43	0.5	0.5	7.0	6.3	13.3	3.3	2.0

== Honours and achievements ==
Team

- 2× McClelland Trophy (Geelong): 2019, 2022

Individual

- Geelong F.C. VFL Best & Fairest: 2019
