= Kamdyn McIntosh =

Australian rules footballer (born 1994)

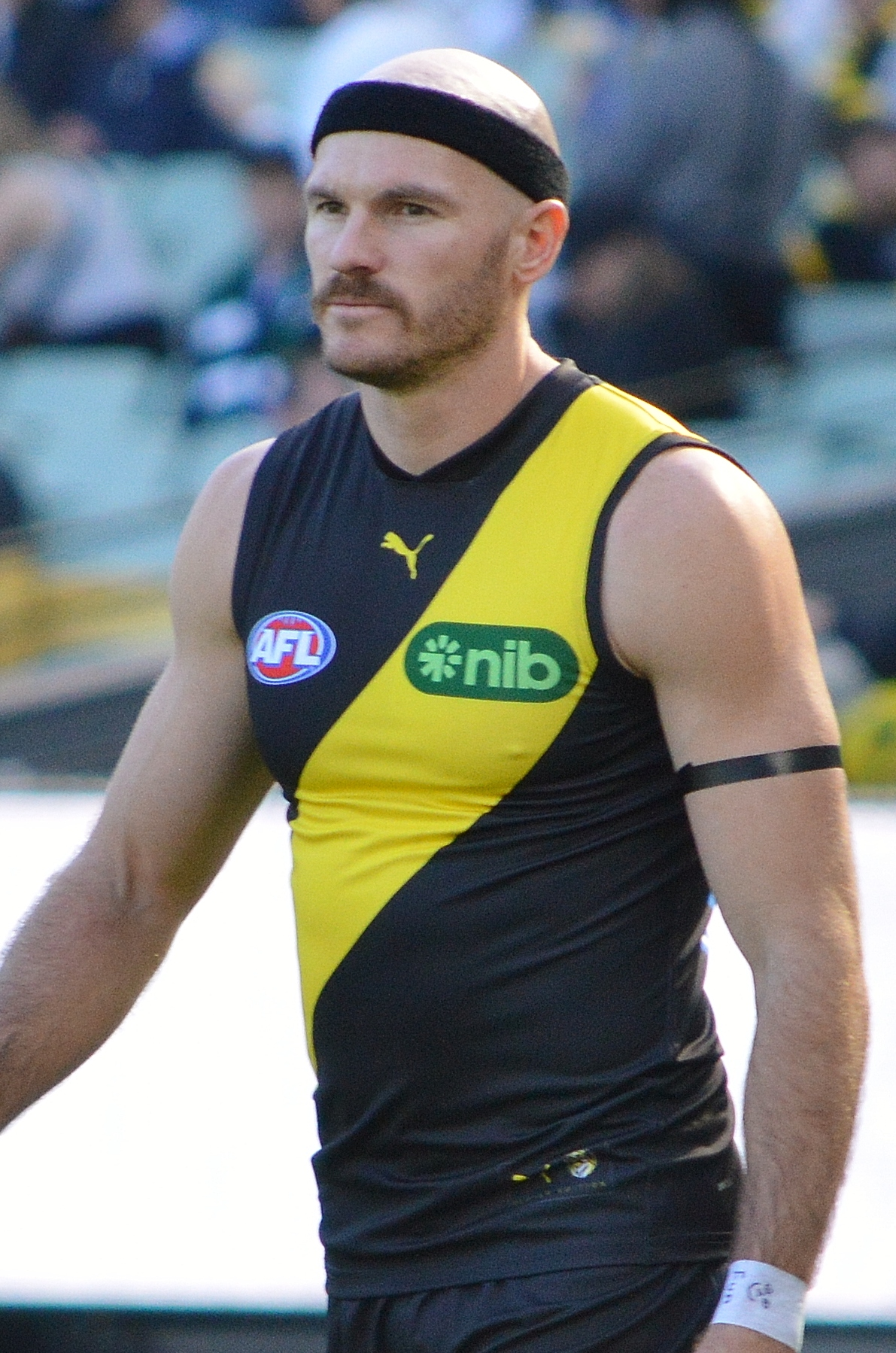
- McIntosh with Richmond in April 2025

Personal information
- Full name: Kamdyn McIntosh
- Nicknames: Kapps, Kappa, Macca, Feathers
- Born: 3 April 1994 (age 32); Pinjarra, Western Australia
- Original teams: Peel (WAFL); Pinjarra (PFL)
- Draft: No. 31, 2012 AFL National Draft: Richmond
- Debut: Round 1, 2015, Richmond vs. Carlton, at MCG
- Height: 192 cm (6 ft 4 in)
- Weight: 92 kg (203 lb)
- Position: Midfielder / defender

Playing career
Years	Club	Games (Goals)
2013–2025	Richmond	213 (62)

Career highlights
- 2× AFL premiership player: 2017, 2020; Cosgrove–Jenkins Award (RFC Best First-Year Player): 2015

Kamdyn McIntosh (born 3 April 1994) is a former professional Australian rules footballer who played for the Richmond Football Club in the Australian Football League (AFL). He is a two time premiership player, having played in grand final victories with Richmond in 2017 and 2020.

== Early life and junior career ==
McIntosh was born to parents Clayton and Carol in Pinjarra, Western Australia as the third of nine children. He often acted as carer to his younger siblings given the adults of the household both worked fly-in fly-out mining jobs away from home.

He grew up playing soccer, before switching to competitive football at the age of 15 for the local Pinjarra Tigers in the Peel Football League. He went on to play for the Western Australian under 16 representative side in 2010 and again at under 18 level at the 2012 AFL Under 18 Championships.

In 2012 he played reserves and junior football with the Peel Thunder Football Club before playing four senior matches in the WAFL where he averaged 17.5 disposals and five marks.

He recorded a top-5 endurance beep test score in his class at the 2012 Draft Combine.

== AFL career ==
=== 2013 and 2014 seasons ===
McIntosh was drafted by Richmond with the club's second pick and 31st selection overall in the 2012 National Draft.

In 2013 and 2014 he failed to earn a match at senior level, instead playing with the club's reserves side in the VFL. Despite the latter of those seasons being hampered by a foot injury, McIntosh managed an average of 13 disposals a game in a defensive role in the VFL in the month of August.

=== 2015 season ===
McIntosh made his AFL debut in his third year at the club, in a round 1 2015 win against Carlton. McIntosh recorded 23 disposals and one goal and was rewarded with the round 1 nomination for the 2015 AFL Rising Star award. He went on to play in all of the club's matches that season, including a losing elimination final against North Melbourne. McIntosh averaged 15.3 disposals for the year, and placed 10th at the club for total disposals. He received the Cosgrove–Jenkins Award at the conclusion of the 2015 season as the club's best first year player. McIntosh finished 17th in the club's best and fairest count that year.

=== 2016 season ===
McIntosh began 2016 strongly, playing in six of the club's first matches including a career best 28 disposals in a round 2 loss to Collingwood. While training in May he suffered a syndesmosis ankle injury that saw him placed onto the long term injury list however. He would not return to senior football that year, finishing the season with just six games played and an average of 18 disposals.

=== 2017 season ===
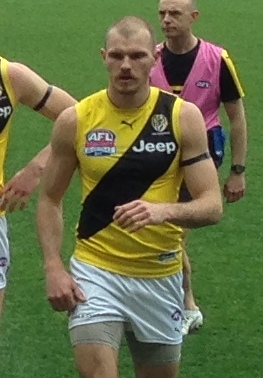
McIntosh during the 2017 AFL Grand Final

His return to football in 2017 saw McIntosh immediately re-enter the club's best 22, lining up against Carlton in Richmond's round 1 victory. He was omitted from the side the following week however, relegated to VFL football. He returned to the top level after just one match though and hit strong form immediately, turning in 22 disposals and six tackles in the club's round 3 win over West Coast. He remained in the club's AFL side for the rest of the home and away season, turning in 20 or more disposals on three occasions, including a 24 touch and five tackle match against North Melbourne in round 11. In round 23 he played his 50th career match, adding 13 disposals and six marks in a win over St Kilda. McIntosh held his spot into finals too, playing a contributing role in wins over Geelong and Greater Western Sydney. He became a premiership player the next week, when Richmond defeated minor premiers Adelaide by 48 points in the Grand Final.

=== 2018 season ===
For the fourth-straight year McIntosh started the 2018 season in the club's best 22, picked to play in all pre-season matches and in the club's round 1 match-up with Carlton where he recorded a team-high 658 metres gained. McIntosh was subject to a $2,000 fine in round 4 for engaging in rough conduct on the Brisbane Lions's Allen Christensen. In round 5's ANZAC Day eve blockbuster against Melbourne he made a scoreboard impact when he kicked two-goals, just his second such haul in his career to-date. McIntosh remained with the senior side for a further eight matches and through to the club's round 14 bye. On the back of three consecutive matches with less than 10 disposals, McIntosh entered the bye averaging the fewest disposals (12.7), second fewest uncontested possessions (8.7) and the second fewest tackles (1.8) of any regularly starting winger in the league. As a result of those performances, McIntosh did not earn senior selection in round 15, instead dropped back to playing reserves football in the VFL. There he was trialed in a role as inside midfielder for three matches, before earning a recall to senior football in his normal wing role in round 18's win over St Kilda. McIntosh's output immediately improved on his early-season form, contributing 14, 20, 13 and 16 disposals in his first four matches back. In round 22 he recorded 20 disposals, but also attracted attention for his involvement in an off-ball incident with Devon Smith in which the Essendon midfielder swung at, and narrowly avoided making contact with, McIntosh's jaw. Smith received only a fine for the incident. After earning a minor premiership with 18 wins in the regular season, McIntosh's side entered the finals series with a qualifying final match-up against Hawthorn. He kicked a career-high three goals in the match and helped the team earn a preliminary final birth. Two weeks later McIntosh recorded 15 disposals in what would prove a shock knock-out loss to Collingwood. He finished the season having played 21 matches and kicking a career-best nine goals.

=== 2019 season ===
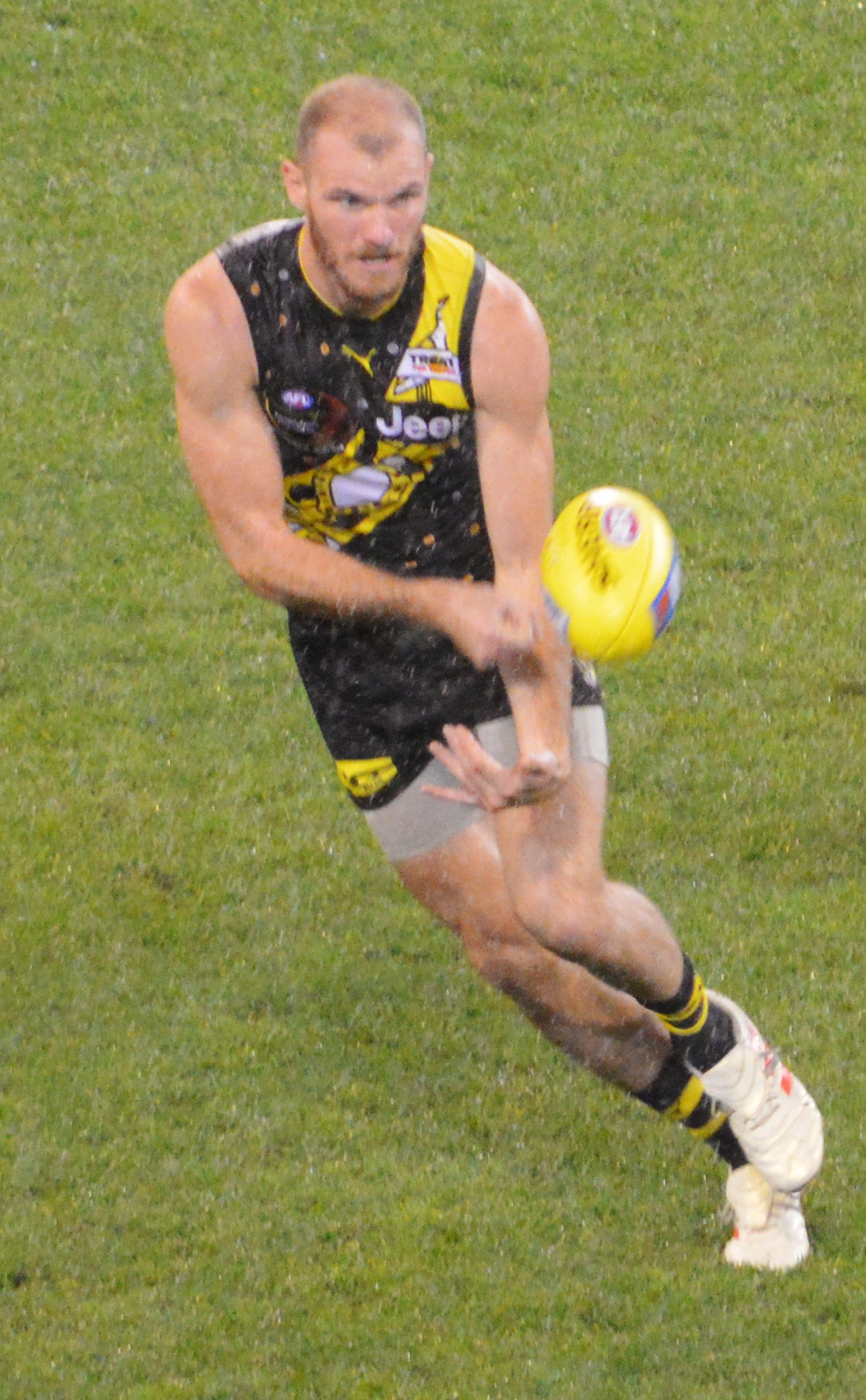
McIntosh handballs in the round 10, 2019 Dreamtime at the 'G match

After being left out of the first, McIntosh started his 2019 season with an appearance in the club's second and final pre-season match before recording 13 disposals and kicking a goal in round 1's season-opening match against Carlton. He earned one vote in the Coaches Association player of the year award for that performance, one of just six players on the ground to receive votes. In a round 4 win over Port Adelaide, McIntosh attracted a $1,000 fine for misconduct after laying a dangerous tackle on opposition midfielder Ollie Wines. The next week he returned to Richmond's best, one of five Tigers to receive coaches award votes in the win over Sydney in which he recorded 14 disposals and six tackles. McIntosh repeated the feat in round 8, earning two more coaches votes while kicking one goal in a win against Fremantle in his home state. Through the first 13 rounds of the season, McIntosh was one of just four Richmond players to play in all matches that year. Despite that run, McIntosh would be dropped down to reserves level following a 12 disposal performance against the Giants in round 17. He would remain at the lower level through the beginning of the VFL finals series, building versatility by trialing as a defender in an ultimately failed attempt to break back into the senior side in the final month of the season. McIntosh played both as a defender and in his usual wing role for the Richmond reserves' first VFL finals match, recording eight disposals in a come-from-behind qualifying final win over the Essendon reserves. In the VFL preliminary final a fortnight later he posted 15 disposals as Richmond's reserves defeated Port Melbourne and won through to that league's grand final. When Jack Graham and Nathan Broad suffered a shoulder dislocation and concussion respectively in the AFL preliminary final the next week, McIntosh was considered a possible replacement for either should they prove unable to play in the upcoming AFL grand final. As a result, he was held out from playing in the club's victorious VFL grand final two days later. Broad was ruled fit to play, while Marlion Pickett was called in to replace Graham, leaving McIntosh overlooked for a call up to what would be an AFL premiership winning side. He was instead named an emergency, ultimately becoming one of just six players on the Richmond list to play in neither the AFL NM VFL premiership winning sides that season. McIntosh finished 2019 by placing 15th in the club's best and fairest count after played 16 matches at AFL level as well as five with the club's reserves side in the VFL. Despite off-season media speculation that he could seek a trade away from Richmond due to his failure to play finals football, McIntosh remained with the club through the trade period and into the 2020 pre-season without any trade being seriously explored.

=== 2020 season ===
During a pre-season training camp on the Gold Coast in January 2020, McIntosh suffered a series syndesmosis ankle injury in his right foot. Though surgery was not required, McIntosh would miss five weeks of training in order to repair the injury and was slated to return to fitness before the club's final pre-season series match. While he missed this target, he did manage to participate in a VFL practice match in the first week March and was scheduled to play in another the following week that was eventually cancelled due to safety concerns as a result of the rapid progression of the coronavirus pandemic into Australia. McIntosh could not earn selection to AFL level when the season began a week later, and was instead a non-playing emergency for the win over Carlton that was played without crowds in attendance due to public health prohibitions on large gatherings. In what was the first of what the league planned would be a reduced 17-round season, the match was also played with quarter lengths reduced by one fifth in order to reduce the physical load on players who would be expected to play multiple matches with short breaks in the second half of the year. Just three days later, the AFL Commission suspended the season for an indefinite period after multiple states enforced quarantine conditions on their borders that effectively ruled out the possibility of continuing the season as planned. McIntosh was a non-playing emergency when the season resumed in June after an 11-week hiatus, instead getting his first competitive play of the season in an unofficial scratch match against Hawthorn's reserves the following week after all AFL clubs' withdrawal from the VFL season. A strong output there saw him selected for his first top-level game of the year in a round 4 loss to St Kilda. Despite what Fox Sports called a "poor" performance in his return to AFL level, McIntosh held his place over the coming weeks including after the club and all its Victorian counterparts were relocated to the Gold Coast in response to a virus outbreak in Melbourne. In the club's first week on the Gold Coast, McIntosh played a starring role in Richmond's round 6 win over Sydney, earning two Coaches Association award votes for a performance that included 24 disposals and 540 metres gained. McIntosh played his 100th career match in round 13's Dreamtime in Darwin win over Essendon. He continued to hold his spot over the remainder of the regular season, kicking three goals across the final six matches of the season including one kicked in a second-best on ground performance against Fremantle that earned him four coaches votes. After recording just seven disposals in a first-up qualifying final loss to the Brisbane Lions, McIntosh rebounded with 19 disposals, six inside 50s and a goal in the club's semi-final win over St Kilda. He added 13 disposals in a preliminary final win against Port Adelaide and became a two-time premiership player one week after that, contributing what AFL Media described as a "typically hard-working" performance that included 13 disposals and a goal in Richmond's 31-point grand final victory over Geelong. In addition to his premiership silverware, McIntosh earned the Kevin Bartlett medal for a career-best fifth place finish in the club's best and fairest count, despite playing just 18 of a possible 21 matches that season.

At the end of the 2025 season, Richmond announced that they would not be offering McIntosh a new contract, finishing up having been at the club for 13 seasons and having played 213 senior games.

== Player profile ==
McIntosh plays as a winger, but has previously also played as a half-back and now has brief stints in the midfield. He is notable for his physical attributes including his running ability and his relative strength and body size for someone in his playing position.

== Statistics ==
Legend
G	Goals	K	Kicks	D	Disposals	T	Tackles
B	Behinds	H	Handballs	M	Marks

Season	Team	No.	Games	Totals							Averages (per game)							Votes
Season	Team	No.	Games	G	B	K	H	D	M	T	G	B	K	H	D	M	T	Votes
2013		33	0	—	—	—	—	—	—	—	—	—	—	—	—	—	—	0
2014		33	0	—	—	—	—	—	—	—	—	—	—	—	—	—	—	0
2015	Richmond	33	23	8	8	242	111	353	94	60	0.3	0.3	10.5	4.8	15.3	4.1	2.6	2
2016	Richmond	33	6	0	1	73	35	108	30	14	0.0	0.2	12.2	5.8	18.0	5.0	2.3	0
2017^{#}	Richmond	33	24	2	5	230	127	357	84	76	0.1	0.2	9.6	5.3	14.9	3.5	3.2	0
2018	Richmond	33	21	9	3	198	94	292	66	43	0.4	0.1	9.4	4.5	13.9	3.1	2.0	0
2019	Richmond	33	16	7	3	152	74	226	64	46	0.4	0.2	9.5	4.6	14.1	4.0	2.9	0
2020^{#}	Richmond	33	18	6	4	165	79	244	68	30	0.3	0.2	9.2	4.4	13.6	3.8	1.7	0
2021	Richmond	33	17	1	4	182	81	263	69	41	0.1	0.2	10.7	4.8	15.5	4.1	2.4	0
2022	Richmond	33	21	9	2	234	103	337	103	44	0.4	0.1	11.1	4.9	16.0	4.9	2.1	0
2023	Richmond	33	22	6	6	223	94	317	93	45	0.3	0.3	10.1	4.3	14.4	4.2	2.0	0
2024	Richmond	33	22	6	7	173	81	254	77	36	0.3	0.3	7.9	3.7	11.5	3.5	1.6	0
2025	Richmond	33	23	8	6	185	148	333	83	58	0.3	0.3	8.0	6.4	14.5	3.6	2.5	0
Career			213	62	49	2057	1027	3084	831	493	0.3	0.2	9.7	4.8	14.5	3.9	2.3	2

== Honours and achievements ==
AFL (Team)

- AFL premiership player (Richmond): 2017, 2020
- McClelland Trophy (Richmond): 2018

AFL (Individual)

- AFL Rising Star nominee: 2015
- Cosgrove–Jenkins Award (Richmond best first-year player): 2015
