= 2020 AFL Grand Final =

Premiership-deciding game of the 2020 AFL season

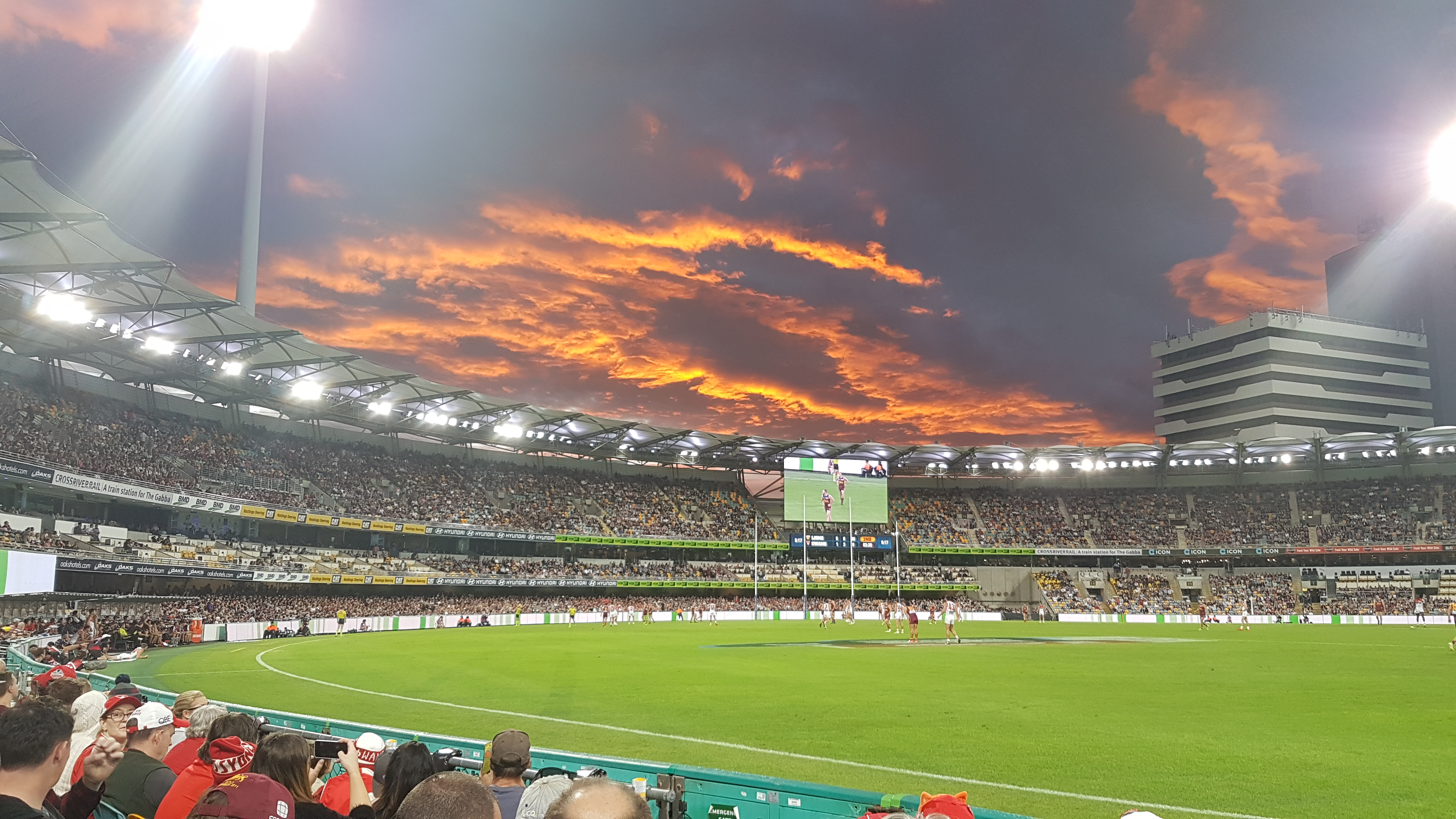
- The Gabba (pictured in 2019), where the 2020 AFL Grand Final was played.

Richmond	Geelong
12.9 (81)	7.8 (50)
	1	2	3	4
RICH	2.1 (13)	3.2 (20)	7.4 (46)	12.9 (81)
GEEL	2.2 (14)	5.5 (35)	6.8 (44)	7.8 (50)
- Date: 24 October 2020, 6:30 pm
- Stadium: The Gabba
- Attendance: 29,707
- Favourite: Richmond
- Umpires: Matt Stevic, Simon Meredith, Craig Fleer
- Coin toss won by: Richmond
- Kicked toward: Wellington Street End

Ceremonies
- Pre-match entertainment: Cub Sport, DMA's, Electric Fields, Thelma Plum, Andrew Stockdale, Busby Marou, Mike Brady (Performed from the MCG)
- National anthem: Tim McCallum
- Halftime show: Sheppard with the Queensland Symphony Orchestra

Accolades
- Norm Smith Medallist: Dustin Martin
- Jock McHale Medallist: Damien Hardwick

Broadcast in Australia
- Network: Seven Network
- Commentators: Bruce McAvaney (host and commentator); Brian Taylor (commentator); Luke Hodge (expert commentator); Michael Voss (special commentator); Abbey Holmes (boundary rider)

The 2020 AFL Grand Final was an Australian rules football match contested between Richmond and Geelong at the Gabba in Brisbane, Queensland, on Saturday 24 October 2020. It was the 125th annual Grand Final of the Australian Football League (formerly the Victorian Football League), staged to determine the premiers for the 2020 AFL season. The match was originally scheduled for the last Saturday of September but was delayed several weeks due to the suspension of the season stemming from the impact of the COVID-19 pandemic. It was the first AFL grand final to be staged outside the state of Victoria, and the first to be held at night.

The match was won by Richmond by a margin of 31 points, marking the club's thirteenth VFL/AFL premiership and their third in four seasons. Richmond's Dustin Martin won the Norm Smith Medal as the player judged best on ground, becoming the first player to win three Norm Smith Medals. The match was attended by 29,707 spectators, just short of the reduced capacity allowed at the venue under pandemic guidelines.

== Background ==
=== Impact of COVID-19 pandemic and venue change ===
In the originally released fixture for the 2020 season, the grand final was scheduled according to convention on the last Saturday in September (26 September, 2:30pm) at the Melbourne Cricket Ground. However, the season and the scheduling of the grand final were disrupted by the COVID-19 pandemic, which began to spread in Australia in March 2020. Although the season restarted on 11 June, the fixture was under a constant cloud of uncertainty, and it was not until 2 September that arrangements for the grand final were finally announced.

The home-and-away season was shortened to 17 matches per club, instead of the originally intended 22, and the season was suspended entirely for almost three months between 22 March and 11 June as Australia dealt with its first wave of the virus. This adjusted fixture had the effect of delaying the end of the regular season until mid-September, and pushing the grand final back to a provisional date of 17 October. The game was ultimately scheduled for 24 October, surpassing the 1923 VFL Grand Final (which was played on 20 October 1923) as the latest in the year to play the grand final.

The playing of the match at the Melbourne Cricket Ground, as contracted until at least 2057, was complicated by a second wave of the virus in Melbourne that commenced in July, which resulted in tighter border restrictions, local lockdowns, and social distancing rules. All Victorian clubs left the state for the majority of the season, basing themselves primarily in Queensland, and on 24 August it was announced that the MCG could not host the grand final. The Gabba, home stadium of the Brisbane Lions in the central Brisbane suburb of Woolloongabba, Queensland, was ultimately announced to host the match; Adelaide Oval was kept available as a backup venue in the event of a virus outbreak in Brisbane. As part of negotiations, the deal to play the grand final at the Melbourne Cricket Ground was extended by one year to 2058, and two extra home-and-away matches were granted to the ground in 2022 and 2023. It was the first time that a VFL/AFL grand final in its 123-year history was played outside of Victoria, and the first time since 1991 that the match was played away from the Melbourne Cricket Ground. A 3 m^{2} section of Melbourne Cricket Ground turf was transplanted into the Gabba surface to ensure the traditional venue was still part of the event.

The venue's normal capacity of 42,000 was reduced to 30,000 to comply with health department restrictions still in force at the time, and many tickets were available for general public sale for the first time in more than 20 years—this was in contrast to all grand final tickets having been sold through different corporate and membership allocations in recent years. The reduced capacity was all but filled, with 29,707 attending the match; the restrictions meant it was the lowest crowd to attend a grand final since 1917, during World War I.

In the lead-up to the announcement, it was widely reported that the league was strongly considering moving the match to a twilight or evening timeslot to avoid a clash with major Melbourne Spring Racing Carnival races (the Caulfield Cup on 17 October or the Cox Plate on 24 October). Ultimately, the match was scheduled for a start time of 6:30pm AEST to avoid the Cox Plate, the first time the match had not been played in the traditional afternoon timeslot.

The Grand Final Eve public holiday, observed in Victoria, was shifted to 23 October in line with the adjusted date.

=== Qualification ===
The top eight teams on the ladder at the conclusion of the home-and-away season qualified for the 2020 AFL finals series, with the winners of the two preliminary finals to meet in the grand final.

After winning the 2019 AFL Grand Final over Greater Western Sydney, Richmond ended the season in third place after defeating Adelaide to finish with a 12-4-1 win–loss record. They played Brisbane Lions in the second qualifying final and were defeated by 15 points, in what was Brisbane's first win over Richmond in the past 15 attempts. This meant that they had to play in a semi-final against St Kilda, which they won by 31 points. Then, in a low-scoring, rain-affected preliminary final against minor premiers Port Adelaide, Richmond won by six points to advance to their third grand final in four years.

Geelong entered the 2020 season having won the previous year's minor premiership, but finished third after being eliminated in the preliminary final. The club performed solidly throughout the season to finish 4th with a 12–5 record, but with the league's highest percentage. Geelong played their qualifying final against Port Adelaide, losing by 16 points. In the semi-final against Collingwood, Geelong conceded only one goal in the first half before winning by a dominant 68 points; and then they overcame the Brisbane Lions in the preliminary final to win by 40 points.

It was the third grand final between the two sides, having previously contested the 1931 and 1967 VFL Grand Finals for one win apiece. It was the first grand final to feature two Victorian-based teams since 2011, and only the third grand final not to feature either team that finished first or second on the ladder at the conclusion of the home-and-away season since it became possible in 1972 (the others being 1980 and 2019). The teams had met in a preliminary final the previous year, Richmond winning that game after trailing by 21-points at half time.

Richmond was a slight favourite to win the game; bookmakers offered $1.84 odds for a Richmond victory against $2.05 for a Geelong win.

== Match summary ==
The game was played on a damp field. Heavy rain had fallen for much of the day prior to the match, with some forecasts even warning of thunderstorms around the ground, but all rain cleared prior to the game and stayed away throughout. This was fortunate, as the ground had become inundated the day after. The match was played under the 2020 AFL season's temporarily adjusted timing rules, with quarters lasting 16 minutes of playing time instead of 20 minutes.

=== First quarter ===
The grand final opened with two early injuries after five minutes of play: Tiger Nick Vlastuin was sidelined for the rest of the game after a nasty collision with Geelong's Patrick Dangerfield, resulting in a seven-minute delay as he was stretchered off the ground; and retiring Cat Gary Ablett Jr. injured his shoulder after a tackle from Richmond captain Trent Cotchin. Ablett was able to recover and played out the match, albeit in some discomfort; it was later reported that Ablett played with a broken shoulder. No goal was scored until almost 20 minutes into the quarter, when Dion Prestia scored for the Tigers. Kamdyn McIntosh scored two minutes later to give Richmond an early two-goal lead. The Cats, however, took a one-point lead at the first change, after Cameron Guthrie scored Geelong's first goal at the 25-minute mark and Mitch Duncan goaled at the 33-minute mark.

=== Second quarter ===
Geelong dominated general play throughout most of the second quarter. Dangerfield scored his first goal three minutes into the quarter, and Geelong continued to attack over the subsequent ten minutes, managing only three behinds from several attempts. It was not until Sam Menegola kicked his first goal at the 16-minute mark, followed quickly by one from Tom Hawkins at the 18-minute mark, that Geelong got some reward for its dominance on the scoreboard. At this point, the Cats were leading by 22 points, having completely dominated the territory battle with 14 of the previous 15 inside-50s as well as scoring the last 5.3 (33) of the match either side of quarter time.

In the final few minutes of the quarter, Richmond began to gain the advantage in general play, repeatedly entering its own forward 50 arc in the last few minutes; a late goal from Dustin Martin put them just fifteen points behind at half-time.

=== Third quarter ===
As the third quarter began, the run of general play continued with Richmond, as it had been just before half time. Richmond's share of the contested ball increased, and at one stage the Tigers had a run of ten consecutive inside-50s either side of half-time. Two early goals from Jack Riewoldt and Jason Castagna reduced the margin to just three points. Gryan Miers goaled at the eight-minute mark for Geelong to extend the margin back to nine points; however, the Tigers continued to attack strongly and kicked the next two goals, including one by Kane Lambert (about 12 minutes into the quarter) and one from Martin (at the 16-minute mark), which gave Richmond its first lead since the first quarter. Neither team managed another goal in the third quarter, and Richmond went into three-quarter-time with a two-point lead.

=== Final quarter ===
Richmond carried on its strong play, and, with three goals inside the first thirteen minutes of the quarter, had extended the margin to 22 points: Prestia goaled within the first minute of the final quarter; next, Tom Lynch scored his only goal of the night at the nine-minute mark after a contested mark and close-range set shot; and then Martin kicked his third goal at the 13-minute mark. With half of the quarter gone, it was arguably a match-winning lead.

A few minutes later, Sam Menegola took a solid pack mark for Geelong at centre half-forward, while teammate Sam Simpson was knocked unconscious in the same contest, requiring the game's second extended delay as Simpson was stretchered from the ground; Menegola kicked an impressive goal after the delay to reduce the margin to 16 points and keep a remote chance of victory alive. However, several forward entries by Geelong over the following minutes were repelled by Richmond's defence; and, in response, the Tigers finished with two late goals by Riewoldt and Martin to win by a convincing 31 points. After its largest 22-point deficit in the second quarter, Richmond kicked 10 of the last 12 goals of the match.

=== Post-match ===
Having played his final game, Ablett received a guard of honour from both his teammates and from Richmond as he left the field and led the Cats off.

Tennis player and Richmond fan Ashleigh Barty presented the premiership cup to Richmond.

=== Norm Smith Medal ===
By unanimous selection for the second straight year—15 out of 15 possible votes—Dustin Martin was awarded the Norm Smith Medal as best on ground. With four goals, often at key moments and largely from individual efforts, as well as sixteen kicks, five handballs, five clearances and three tackles, Martin's influence on the game was extremely important for Richmond's recovery and victory. It was Martin's third Norm Smith Medal after having won it in 2017 and 2019, making him the first player ever to win three Norm Smith Medals, and the second to win two consecutively after Adelaide's Andrew McLeod (1997–1998). Tigers defender Jayden Short finished second, gaining 771 meters of ground; Shane Edwards was third, with 27 disposals and nine clearances; and Geelong midfielder Mitch Duncan, who was the most influential player when Geelong built its lead in the first half, polled three votes to finish fourth.

In a controversial moment, Leigh Matthews—who was chairman of the voting panel—gave two votes to Richmond's Nathan Broad. When interviewed later on why he voted for Broad, who played an unremarkable game, a puzzled Matthews recalled giving his two votes to Short, theorising that he must have written the wrong name by accident (a plausible mix-up, given both men's names are qualitative descriptions of length). Fortunately, the misvote did not affect the overall ranking positions, as Dustin Martin had tallied an unassailable lead over Short. Byron Pickett, who won the honour in 2004 with Port Adelaide, presented the medal.

Norm Smith Medal voting tally
Position	Player	Club	Total votes	Vote summary
1 (winner)	Dustin Martin	Richmond	15	3, 3, 3, 3, 3
2	Jayden Short	Richmond	6	2, 2, 2
3	Shane Edwards	Richmond	4	1, 1, 1, 1
4	Mitch Duncan	Geelong	3	2, 1
5	Nathan Broad	Richmond	2	2

Chaired by Leigh Matthews, the voters and their choices were as follows:

Voter	Role	3 votes	2 votes	1 vote
Leigh Matthews	3AW	Dustin Martin	Nathan Broad	Shane Edwards
Lauren Arnell	ABC	Dustin Martin	Jayden Short	Mitch Duncan
Malcolm Blight	SEN	Dustin Martin	Mitch Duncan	Shane Edwards
Damian Barrett	AFL Media	Dustin Martin	Jayden Short	Shane Edwards
Peter Ryan	The Age	Dustin Martin	Jayden Short	Shane Edwards

== Entertainment ==
Prior the start of the match, classically trained tenor and 2015 contestant on The Voice Tim McCallum sang the national anthem, and Mike Brady performed his football anthem "Up There Cazaly" live from an empty Melbourne Cricket Ground. Performances by bands Cub Sport, DMA's and Sheppard, as well duo Electric Fields and Wolfmother frontman Andrew Stockdale (with the Queensland Symphony Orchestra), completed an all-Australian entertainment line-up.

The AFL Grand Final Sprint was held at quarter-time rather than the conventional half-time slot, and it was won by Geelong's Jordan Clark.

== Teams ==
The two teams both went into the Grand Final unchanged from their preliminary final line-ups.

Both teams included players from their past premiership-winning teams in the 21st century. 14 of Richmond's 22 players had played in both their 2017 and 2019 premiership teams. Geelong included five members who had been part of at least one of their premiership teams from 2007, 2009 and 2011: Gary Ablett Jr., Joel Selwood, Harry Taylor, Mitch Duncan and Coleman Medalist Tom Hawkins, with Ablett, one of the last two remaining members from the team that beat Port Adelaide in 2007, also playing his final game. The Cats also selected Luke Dahlhaus, who had previously featured in the Western Bulldogs' triumph in 2016 against Sydney.

Geelong's team through the latter part of the season and into the finals was notable as one of the oldest by average player age in the league's history; the selected grand final 22, with an average age of 28 years and 117 days, was at the time the second-oldest selected team in any VFL/AFL game, second only to Geelong's qualifying final team from three weeks earlier; other Geelong teams in 2021 and 2022 also later passed the tally.

Richmond	Geelong

Richmond
B:	12 David Astbury	2 Dylan Grimes	21 Noah Balta
HB:	7 Liam Baker	1 Nick Vlastuin	14 Bachar Houli
C:	33 Kamdyn McIntosh	3 Dion Prestia	50 Marlion Pickett
HF:	23 Kane Lambert	11 Jason Castagna	4 Dustin Martin
F:	19 Tom Lynch	8 Jack Riewoldt	17 Daniel Rioli
Foll:	25 Toby Nankervis	10 Shane Edwards	9 Trent Cotchin
Int:	34 Jack Graham	29 Shai Bolton	15 Jayden Short
Int:	35 Nathan Broad		
Coach:	Damien Hardwick		

Geelong
B:	24 Jed Bews	7 Harry Taylor	8 Jake Kolodjashnij
HB:	25 Lachie Henderson	46 Mark Blicavs	44 Tom Stewart
C:	22 Mitch Duncan	14 Joel Selwood	27 Sam Menegola
HF:	40 Luke Dahlhaus	23 Gary Rohan	32 Gryan Miers
F:	42 Mark O'Connor	26 Tom Hawkins	4 Gary Ablett Jr.
Foll:	1 Rhys Stanley	35 Patrick Dangerfield	29 Cameron Guthrie
Int:	38 Jack Henry	3 Brandan Parfitt	2 Zach Tuohy
Int:	37 Sam Simpson		
Coach:	Chris Scott		

Umpires

The umpiring panel—comprising three field umpires, four boundary umpires, two goal umpires, and an emergency in each position—is given below.

2020 AFL Grand Final umpires
Position					Emergency
Field:	9 Matt Stevic (8)	21 Simon Meredith (6)	26 Craig Fleer (1)		23 Robert Findlay
Boundary:	Michael Marantelli (4)	Ian Burrows (9)	Matthew Konetschka (3)	Matthew Tomkins (4)	Christopher Gordon
Goal:	Matthew Dervan (1)	Steven Piperno (3)			Steven Axon

Numbers in brackets represent the number of grand finals umpired, including 2020.

== Scoreboard ==
Grand Final
Saturday, 24 October (6:30 pm)	Richmond	def.	Geelong	Gabba (crowd: 29,707)	Report
2.1 (13); 3.2 (20); 7.4 (46); 12.9 (81)	Q1; Q2; Q3; Final	2.2 (14); 5.5 (35); 6.8 (44); 7.8 (50)	Umpires: Stevic, Meredith, Fleer; Norm Smith Medal: Dustin Martin; Television broadcast: Seven Network; National anthem: Tim McCallum
Martin 4, Prestia 2, Riewoldt 2, Castagna, Lambert, Lynch, McIntosh	Goals	Menegola 2, Dangerfield, Duncan, Guthrie, Hawkins, Miers
Martin, Short, Edwards, Prestia, Cotchin, Bolton	Best	Duncan, Stewart, Selwood, Menegola, Dahlhaus
Vlastuin (concussion), Houli (calf)	Injuries	Ablett (shoulder), Simpson (concussion)
Nil	Reports	Nil
Richmond won its 13th VFL/AFL premiership.; Dustin Martin (2017, 2019 and 2020) became the first three-time Norm Smith Medalist in VFL/AFL history.; Trent Cotchin became the first player to win three premierships as Richmond captain.; This was the first-ever VFL/AFL grand final to be played outside Victoria and the first to be played at night.

== Media coverage ==
=== Television ===
The match was televised live throughout Australia on the Seven Network. Although not known to be the case at the time, it was long-time broadcaster Bruce McAvaney's last game as an AFL commentator, as he stepped down from football commentary ahead of the 2021 season. The game was McAvaney’s 20th Grand Final that he called.

=== Radio coverage ===
Station	Region	Play-by-play commentators	Analysts	Boundary riders
Triple M	National	James Brayshaw, Luke Darcy	Wayne Carey, Chris Judd, Nathan Brown, Ash Chua (statistician)	Tom Browne
ABC Radio	National	Quentin Hull, Brett Sprigg	Brad Sewell, Lauren Arnell	Zane Bojack
AFL Nation	National	Dwayne Russell, Jack Heverin	Terry Wallace	
3AW	Melbourne, VIC	Tim Lane, Tony Leonard	Leigh Matthews, Matthew Lloyd, Jimmy Bartel	
SEN	Melbourne, VIC	Anthony Hudson, Gerard Whateley	Garry Lyon, Kane Cornes	
K Rock	Geelong, VIC	Tom King, Ben Casanelia	Mark Neeld	
6PR	Perth, WA	Matt Granland, Shane McInnes	Brad Hardie, David Schwarz	
