= Nick Vlastuin =

Australian rules footballer (born 1994)

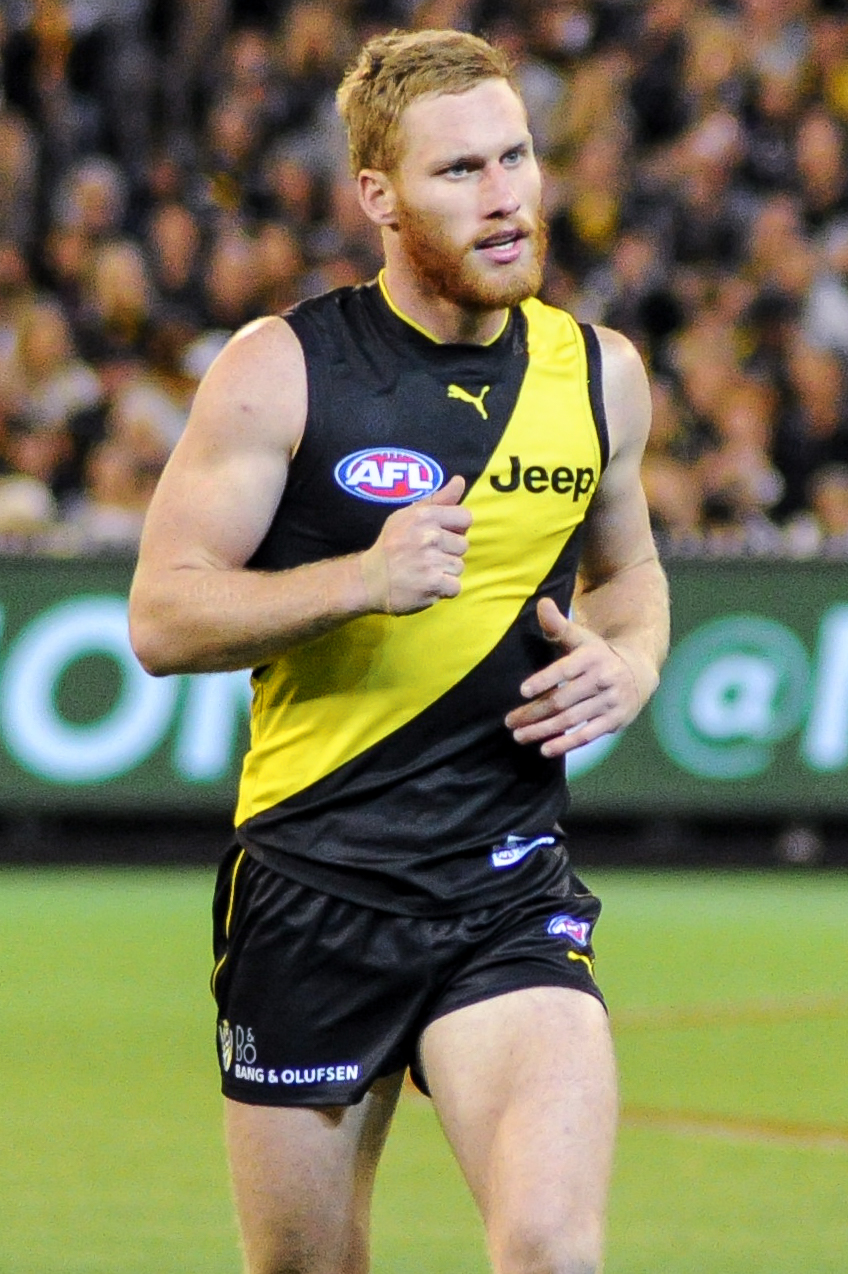
- Vlastuin playing for Richmond in March 2017

Personal information
- Full name: Nicholas Alexander Leendert Vlastuin
- Nickname: Tigger
- Born: 19 April 1994 (age 32)
- Original teams: Eltham (NFL); Northern Knights (TAC Cup)
- Draft: No. 9, 2012 AFL National Draft: Richmond
- Debut: Round 5, 2013, Richmond vs. Fremantle, at Subiaco Oval
- Height: 187 cm (6 ft 2 in)
- Weight: 88 kg (194 lb)
- Position: Defender

Club information
- Current club: Richmond
- Number: 1

Playing career^{1}
Years	Club	Games (Goals)
2013–	Richmond	277 (30)
- ^{1} Playing statistics correct to the end of 2026.

Career highlights
- AFL: 3× AFL premiership player: 2017, 2019, 2020; AFL Rising Star nominee: 2013; Richmond: 2× Jack Titus Medal (2nd RFC B&F): 2024, 2025; Maurie Fleming Medal (3rd RFC B&F): 2020; 2× Fred Swift Medal (4th RFC B&F): 2019, 2023; Cosgrove–Jenkins Award (RFC best first-year player): 2013; Richmond Life Member: 2017

Nicholas Alexander Leendert Vlastuin (/ˈflɒstəʊn/; born 19 April 1994) is a professional Australian rules footballer playing for the Richmond Football Club in the Australian Football League (AFL). He is a three-time premiership player with the club, winning in 2017, 2019 and 2020. He plays as a hybrid defender, adept at directly defending small forwards, taking intercepting marks and rebounding from defensive

== Early life and junior football ==
Vlastuin spent his formative years living in Eltham North, a suburb in Melbourne's north-east. He played his junior football at Eltham in the Northern Football League before moving to the Northern Knights in the TAC Cup at the age of 14.

In 2011 Vlastuin represented the premiership winning Victorian Metro side at the Under-18 National championships. He returned to the team in 2012, this time captaining the side to the competition title. He was also named All-Australian for his performances in the tournament. As an Under-18 player Vlastuin was also a member of the AFL-AIS academy; an elite training program for 30 of the country's best young footballers.

Vlastuin completed high school at St Helena Secondary College in 2011. In addition to football commitments, he worked as a pool lifeguard during 2012.

== AFL career ==
=== 2013 season ===
Vlastuin was drafted with Richmond's first pick and the ninth selection overall in the 2012 AFL Draft .

Vlastuin made his AFL debut in round 5 of the 2013 AFL season in an away game against Fremantle at Subiaco Oval. In round 7 of the same season he was nominated for the 2013 AFL Rising Star after a 23 possession game against Port Adelaide. He also kicked his first career goal in the match. He would go on to play 18 games in his first season, recording an average of 16.3 disposals and 4.8 marks per game and placing sixth in the Rising Star award. In addition he received the Cosgrove–Jenkins Award as the club's best first-year player.

=== 2014 season ===
Vlastuin began 2014 in the club's best-22, playing in round one against Carlton. In fact, he played in each of the club's first seven matches before suffering a broken finger in round 9 against Melbourne. He would return to football relatively quickly however, missing just two rounds of AFL action. Between rounds 15 and 18 he was prolific floating forward, kicking a goal in each of the three matches. He finished the season having played 20 matches at AFL level, including a finals series appearance for the second straight season. Vlastuin placed seventh at the club for tackles and ninth for rebound 50s in 2014.

=== 2015 season ===
In his third year at the club, Vlastuin managed to play in all 23 possible matches. He recorded double digit possessions in every match in 2015 and finished top-ten at the club for tackles and rebound 50s. He placed sixth in the club's best-and-fairest award, his highest place to date. He was also nominated for the AFLPA's 22 Under 22 team but would fail to make the final team. At season's end he underwent minor hip surgery.

=== 2016 season ===
At the beginning of the 2016 season, Vlastuin adopted the #1 guernsey, worn the previous year by retiring former club captain and personal backline mentor, Chris Newman. In an under strength side for the club's first pre-season tournament match he played the role of captain, despite not being a member of the club's leadership group. He played in each of the club's first four matches that season before a leg injury kept him out of action for two matches. Upon his return in round 7 he took on a midfield role, replacing the injured Trent Cotchin. He recorded 16 disposals, six tackles and a goal in the match but did not reprise the role on a regular basis that season. Vlastuin suffered a concussion in the second quarter of the club's round 11 loss to North Melbourne. In addition to missing the remainder of the match he sat out two more games, not returning until after the bye, in a round 14 match against Brisbane Lions. From that point forward he did not miss a match, finishing the season having played 19 games in 2016. He was again nominated to the 22 Under 22 squad that season but would go unselected for the second straight season. He placed ninth in the club's best and fairest count in 2016.

=== 2017 season ===
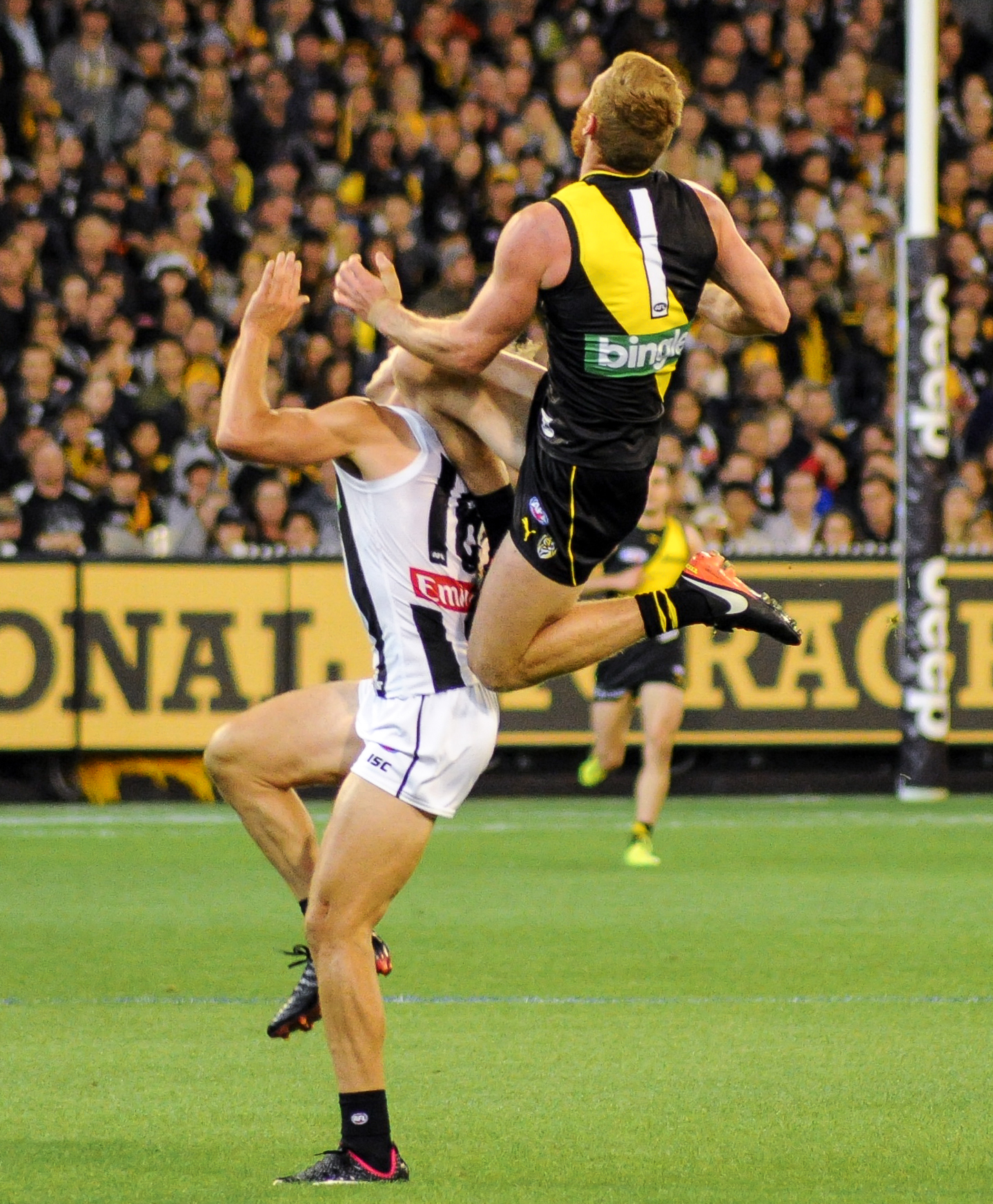
Vlastuin flies for a mark over Collingwood's Chris Mayne in round 2 of the 2017 season

Prior to the 2017 season, Richmond's coaches pegged Vlastuin for a move to a more stoppage focused role. He ceased training with the club's backline specific group and moved into the club's midfield training group. Vlastuin was a key member of Richmond's strong start to the 2017 season, playing in the club's round 1 victory over Carlton. He kicked a goal during the match while his 12 tackles for the match set a career best. Vlastuin suffered a broken nose and concussion in the club's round 3 win over West Coast. He played with the lingering effects of the injury in round 4 before concussion symptoms saw him sit out the club's round 5 match against Melbourne. Vlastuin suffered a shoulder injury in the second quarter of his side's round 7 match against the Western Bulldogs. Scans later revealed a small scapula fracture with initial estimations suggesting he would miss three to four weeks of play. He ultimately missed more than two months of AFL football, returning to the club's senior side in round 17 following a fortnight of matches in the VFL. He would however return to his previous home in the backline, with his midfield move scuttled by his injury, by previous injuries to key backline personnel and by the emergence of young midfielder Jack Graham. Vlastuin was back to his best in that role, lifting his metres gained average from 20th at the club to third as well as his intercept possession count from 1.8 to 8.3, good for ninth in the whole league. In round 18 he was among the Tigers' best, recording 11 marks and 21 possessions (including 13 intercept possessions) in the club's win over the GWS Giants. He held his form into the finals series, playing a "pivotal" role in Richmond's qualifying final win over Geelong. When Vlastuin and the Tigers won over Greater Western Sydney in the preliminary final, he was lined up to defend Adelaide's Eddie Betts in the grand final. Vlastuin started slow, giving up a goal to Betts early in the first quarter. He turned his performance around however and contributed 16 possessions and six rebound 50s to Richmond's first premiership winning side in 37 years. He played 16 matches that season and finished 2017 as a premiership player.

=== 2018 season ===
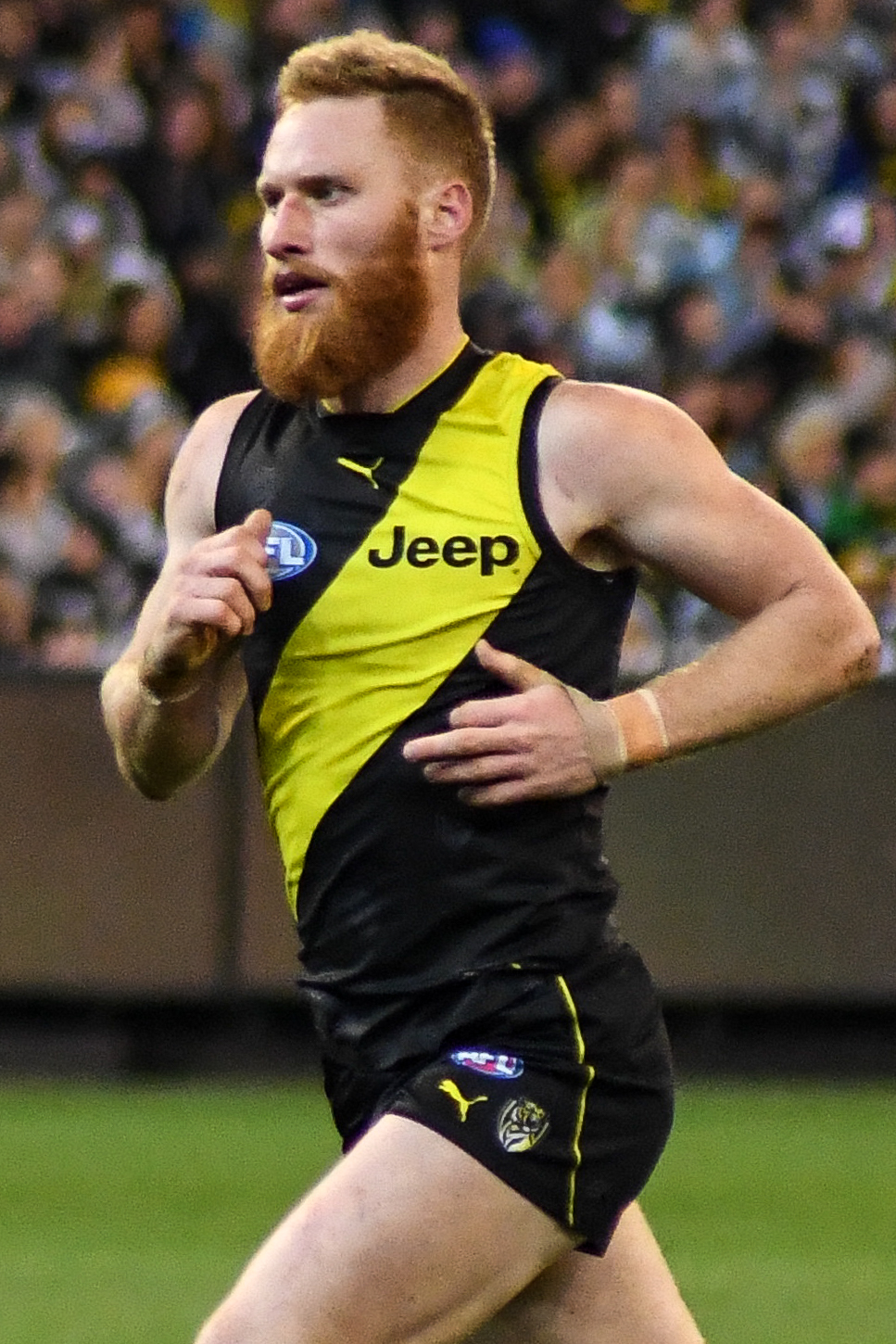
Vlastuin in round 20, 2018

After playing well in each of Richmond's two 2018 pre-season matches, Vlastuin contributed 12 disposals in the club's season-opening win over Carlton. He suffered a delayed concussion from that match however, forcing him to miss round 2's grand final re-match with Adelaide. Vlastuin returned after just one match on the sidelines but was handed a $2,000 fine for a rough conduct charge picked up during that round 3 win over Hawthorn. Two weeks later Vlastuin was ruled out of the club's round 5 ANZAC Day eve match against Melbourne with a minor calf strain. He again missed just a single match, returning to play his 100th career match in round 6's win over Collingwood. After season-best totals of 26 disposals and 12 marks against North Melbourne in round 8, Vlastuin ranked second at Richmond for intercept possessions with an average of 7.5 per game. In round 10 Vlastuin was forced to play the second half of a match against St Kilda as a forward after Richmond full-forward Jack Riewoldt sustained a concussion mid-match. Vlastuin performed strongly in the role, kicking an equal career-best three goals. In round 13's win over Geelong, Vlastuin was named among the best players on the ground by AFL Media and the Australian Associated Press and received best on ground honours from the coaches with nine votes in the coaches association award following a 21 disposal and 11 mark performance. To that point he ranked 14th in the league for intercepts per game. Following the bye Vlastuin was again prolific, notching 21 disposals, 10 marks, a goal and six coaches votes that also saw him named in AFL Media's Team of the Week. However, he also attracted a one match suspension for an elbow to the face of Sydney midfielder Luke Parker that saw him miss one match in round 16. At the beginning of August Fox Footy analyst David King labelled Vlastuin "a Luke Hodge clone" and the "AFL's most prolific intercept marker across the half-back flank (in 2018)". Vlastuin closed out the home and away season with wins in each of Richmond's last six matches that saw the club finish as minor premiers. Despite being unselected in the league's All-Australian squad, Vlastuin was named to the best 22 in The Age chief football reporter Jake Niall's team of the year, "in recognition of his rise to become an elite backman". Richmond opened the finals series with a qualifying final victory over Hawthorn where Vlastuin was identified by AFL Media as a key part of his club's "almost impassable" defence. His finals run would extend just one more match however, when Richmond was eliminated with a shock preliminary final loss to rivals Collingwood. Following the conclusion of the 2018 finals series, Vlastuin was named as a close miss by the Herald Sun's chief football writer Mark Robinson in his list of the 50 best players from the 2018 season. After 21 matches and new career highs in marks and disposals per game, Vlastuin placed eighth in the club's best and fairest award.

=== 2019 season ===
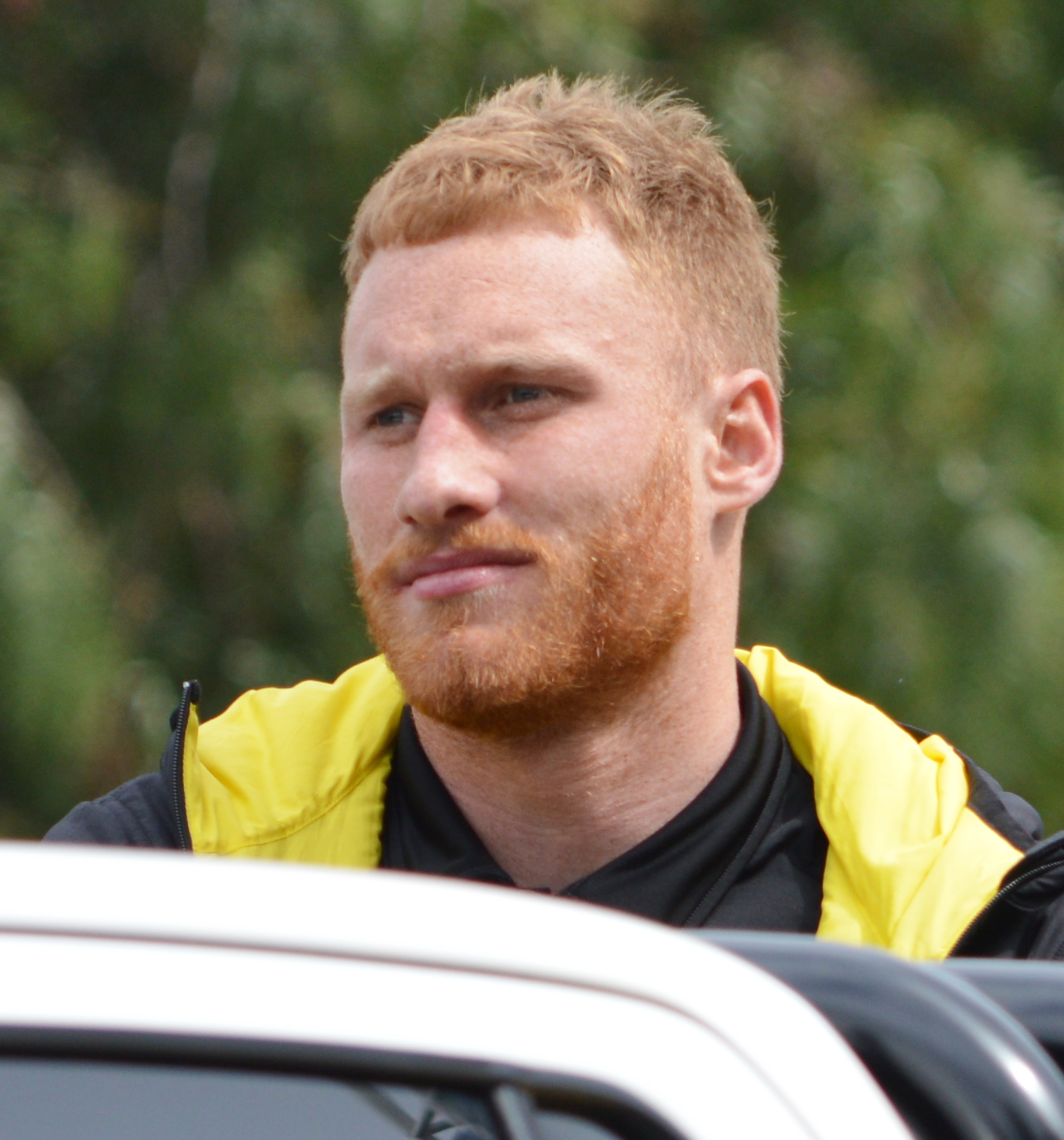
Vlastuin in the 2019 AFL Grand Final parade

Vlastuin started the 2019 season with appearances in each of the club's two pre-season matches, though played only restricted game time in second due to minor soreness. He was fully fit for the club's season opening match against Carlton, where he contributed 14 disposals. The loss of All-Australian defender and teammate Alex Rance to an ACL injury in that match however, would force Vlastuin into a more defensive role that in seasons past, becoming responsible for negating oppositions teams' third forward. In the week following Rance's injury, Fox Footy analyst David King labelled Vlastuin the Richmond player most capable of replacing Rance's prowess as an intercept player. When all three members of Richmond's leadership group were ruled out from playing in round 4, AFL Media named Vlastuin the front runner to captain the side that weekend, though he would eventually be passed over for the role in favour of veteran Shane Edwards. He was however added to the club's de facto leadership group of five, who served in the role during the appointed leaders' playing absence. Two weeks later Vlastuin would show leadership of another kind, named best on ground with a maximum ten coaches award votes for a 28 disposals performance for which he was also named to AFL Media's Team of the Week. In his next match in round 7, Vlastuin would suffer a minor ankle injury during a loss to the Western Bulldogs. Though he would return to the field to play out the match, a mid-week flare up on symptoms would cause Vlastuin to miss the following week's match as a result of the injury. Vlastuin returned to the side in round 9, playing a dual role as defender and midfielder while kicking his first goal of the year and adding 24 disposals. He suffered a knock to the hip in round 12 that saw him in some doubt for round 13's match against Adelaide, but eventually recovered in time to post 24 disposals. Vlastuin recorded more than 20 disposals in three of his next five games following that match, including in round 19 where he received one coaches award vote for a performance that included his then season-best total of eight rebound-50s. He was named among Richmond's best for 24 disposals in round 20, before earning four coaches votes and selection to AFL Media's team of the week in round 21. Vlastuin closed out the home and away season with a nine mark, 13 intercepts best-on-ground performance that earned him nine coaches votes and yet another selection to the AFL Media team of the week in round 23. He finished the home and away season with the third most intercepts of any player that year and placing 14th for marks, while rating as 'elite' for intercepts and intercept marks by the AFL's statistical partner, Champion Data. In the lead up to the finals series, Vlastuin was named to the best 22 in The Age chief football reporter Jake Niall and the Herald Sun chief football reporter Mark Robinson's teams of the year in 2019. Despite that recognition, he was left out of both the final team and even the squad of 40 players for the official All-Australian award and was identified by Fox Footy and the Herald Sun as one of the most notable omissions. In Richmond's qualifying final win over the Brisbane Lions at The Gabba, Vlastuin recorded a career-best 12 rebound-50s in what Fox Footy described as a 'damaging' performance as a ball carrier at half-back. That earned his side a home preliminary final against Geelong, where Vlastuin's defensive efforts helped his side through to a grand final match up against Greater Western Sydney. To that point, Vlastuin ranked fourth in the league for total intercepts that season. In the grand final, Vlastuin was part of a Richmond defence that kept the Giants to 25 points, their lowest score in the club's eight-year history and the lowest score by any team in a VFL/AFL grand final since 1960. He took a match-high 12 marks, was one of only five players to receive coaches award votes (three votes) and was described by AFL Media as "one of the Tigers' best" players on the day. Vlastuin finished the season with a second premiership in three years and placed fourth in the club's best and fairest count, his best finish to date. He was also named at number 41 in Herald Sun chief football reporter Mark Robinson's list of the league's best players in 2019 and was ninth among all defenders on that same list.

=== 2020 season ===
The 2019/20 off-season retirement of fellow defender Alex Rance reconfirmed the need for Vlastuin to repeat his important defensive role of 2019, which he showcased by participating in each of the club's two pre-season matches in March. Vlastuin suffered a head knock and concussion in round 1's win over Carlton, ruling him out of most of the second half of the match. Vlastuin made a full recovery over the 11-week hiatus that followed, returning with 13 disposals in a round 2 draw with Collingwood in early-June. He was among his side's best in a heavy defeat the following week, recording 22 disposals and 10 intercepts in a 32-point loss to Hawthorn. Vlastuin received three coaches award votes in each of rounds 6 and 7, after dual 16-disposal performances in wins over Sydney and North Melbourne. In the week leading in to round 9, Vlastuin suffered a calf strain that saw him miss his side's win over the Western Bulldogs. He returned to play his 150th career match against the Brisbane Lions in round 10, before being caught on camera allegedly groping teammate Mabior Chol during post-match celebrations in the club rooms one week later. Vlastuin issued an apology to Chol and to the public in the days that followed, but escaped without facing club, league or criminal sanctions. In round 13, Vlastuin attracted a $500 AFL Match Review fine for allegedly staging for a free kick during a marking contest in the club's Dreamtime in Darwin win over Essendon. Upon appealing the fine to the AFL Tribunal, Vlastuin was cleared of all charges. He earned four coaches votes as equal second best on ground in round 15, after which point he ranked first among all players in the league for total intercept marks that season. Vlastuin added another three coaches votes each in wins during round 17 and 18, finishing the regular season ranked third among all players for intercepts per game and fourth for intercept marks, and earning a nomination to the All-Australian squad of forty players. Though he would be named in the AFL statistical Player Ratings team of the year and the Herald Sun and The Age's mock All-Australian teams, Vlastuin would be passed over for final recognition in the official best 22 players of that year. Vlastuin had a relatively quiet performance with just one mark in a qualifying final loss to the Brisbane Lions in the opening round of the finals series, before adding six tackles in a semi-final win over St Kilda a week later. He then had what Fox Footy called an impressively clean performance with nine intercept possessions as one of Richmond's best players in a preliminary final victory over Port Adelaide. Vlastuin become a three-time premiership player the following week, lining up in a grand final win over Geelong. His contribution to the victory was limited however, forced to sit out most of the match after suffering a concussion following an errant elbow from Geelong midfielder Patrick Dangerfield in the opening minutes of the game. In addition to the premiership win, Vlastuin earned the Maurie Fleming medal for a third place finish in Richmond's best and fairest award, following a 20-game season. He also placed second among all players in the league for intercept marks that season.

=== 2021 season ===
Ahead of the 2021 season, Vlastuin was labelled by the Herald Sun as the fifth best defender in the league and the 25th best player overall. He played in Richmond's one unofficial and one official pre-season match in late-February and early-March before featuring in the club's round 1 match against Carlton. Vlastuin was substituted out of the game in the third quarter of the match, after suffering a knock to the knee that caused significant internal bleeding around the joint. He was initially considered some chance to be fit for round 2 but was ultimately ruled out, with the same uncertainty continuing into round 3. Ahead of round 4, Vlastuin underwent further scans that showed greater damage to the knee that was first known, and that would require minor surgery which would see him miss at least a further four matches. He made a return to training in late April and was eventually ruled fit to play in the club's round 8 match against Geelong. Vlastuin was used for periods of the second half of round 9's comeback win over Greater Western Sydney in an inside midfield role, in place of the injured Trent Cotchin and Dion Prestia.

== Player profile ==
Vlastuin plays as a hybrid defender, adept at directly defending small forwards, taking intercepting marks and rebounding from defensive 50. He is highly capable at playing as a spare defender, assisting backline teammates in aerial contests while they are directly matched up on an opponent. Since the injury-absence and eventual retirement of teammate Alex Rance in 2019, Vlastuin has become particularly adept at this role as an intercept marker, leading Richmond that year in total intercepts, marks and rebound-50s. The following year he placed second among all players in the league for that stat.

Prior to the start of the 2020 season, AFL statistics partner Champion Data rated Vlastuin in the top tier "elite" category among general defenders in the league. At the end of that season, Vlastuin was ranked the fourth best defender and 19th among all players in the Herald Sun's list of the best players from the 2020 season.

== Statistics ==
Updated to the end of round 22, 2026.

Legend
G	Goals	K	Kicks	D	Disposals	T	Tackles
B	Behinds	H	Handballs	M	Marks
#	Played in that season's premiership team

Season	Team	No.	Games	Totals							Averages (per game)							Votes
Season	Team	No.	Games	G	B	K	H	D	M	T	G	B	K	H	D	M	T	Votes
2013	Richmond	31	18	9	3	157	137	294	86	55	0.5	0.2	8.7	7.6	16.3	4.8	3.1	1
2014	Richmond	31	20	4	3	168	136	304	82	61	0.2	0.2	8.4	6.8	15.2	4.1	3.1	0
2015	Richmond	31	23	1	0	191	161	352	102	62	0.0	0.0	8.3	7.0	15.3	4.4	2.7	0
2016	Richmond	1	19	4	1	187	112	299	107	45	0.2	0.1	9.8	5.9	15.7	5.6	2.4	0
2017^{#}	Richmond	1	16	2	1	163	85	248	90	43	0.1	0.1	10.2	5.3	15.5	5.6	2.7	0
2018	Richmond	1	21	5	3	222	127	349	136	56	0.2	0.1	10.6	6.0	16.6	6.5	2.7	2
2019^{#}	Richmond	1	24	1	1	273	186	459	156	69	0.0	0.0	11.4	7.8	19.1	6.5	2.9	4
2020^{#}	Richmond	1	20	1	0	179	94	273	95	43	0.1	0.0	9.0	4.7	13.7	4.8	2.2	1
2021	Richmond	1	12	0	1	155	63	218	82	27	0.0	0.1	12.9	5.3	18.2	6.8	2.3	0
2022	Richmond	1	17	0	0	251	109	360	131	48	0.0	0.0	14.8	6.4	21.2	7.7	2.8	0
2023	Richmond	1	21	2	1	283	111	394	144	53	0.1	0.0	13.5	5.3	18.8	6.9	2.5	0
2024	Richmond	1	22	0	0	322	121	443	149	49	0.0	0.0	14.6	5.5	20.1	6.8	2.2	0
2025	Richmond	1	22	0	1	309	112	421	134	47	0.0	0.0	14.0	5.1	19.1	6.1	2.1	4
2026	Richmond	1	20	1	2	208	109	317	84	48	0.1	0.1	10.4	5.5	15.9	4.2	2.4	0
Career			275	30	17	3068	1663	4731	1578	706	0.1	0.1	11.2	6.0	17.2	5.7	2.6	12

== Honours and achievements ==
Team

- 3× AFL premiership player (Richmond): 2017, 2019, 2020
- McClelland Trophy (Richmond): 2018

Individual

- All-Australian squad nominee: 2020
- Jack Titus Medal (2nd place, Richmond B&F): 2024
- Maurie Fleming Medal (3rd place, Richmond B&F): 2020
- Fred Swift Medal (4th place, Richmond B&F): 2019
- AFL Rising Star nominee: 2013
- Cosgrove-Jenkins Award (Richmond best first-year player): 2013

Junior

- 2× U18 national champion: 2011, 2012
- U18 All-Australian: 2012
- U18 VIC Metro captain: 2012

== Personal life ==
Vlastuin is a second generation Australian of Dutch descent. His grandfather fought in the Dutch New Guinea army during World War II and was interned in a prisoner of war camp to work on the Thai-Burma Railway. He is son to mother Cecily and father Chris.

Due to a cut on his face that had stitches, Vlastuin was unable to shave for the early part of the 2017 season. He became superstitious and grew out the beard for the remainder of the season, a habit that he repeated during the 2018 season.

Vlastuin traveled to the Indonesian jungles of Sumatra in 2018 as part of Richmond's tiger conservation partnership with the World Wildlife Fund.

Outside of football, Vlastuin is qualified as a carpenter.

Vlastuin's Surf Coast Shire home was subject to a suspected arson attack one day prior to the 2020 AFL Grand Final.
