= Sam Menegola =

Australian rules footballer (born 1992)

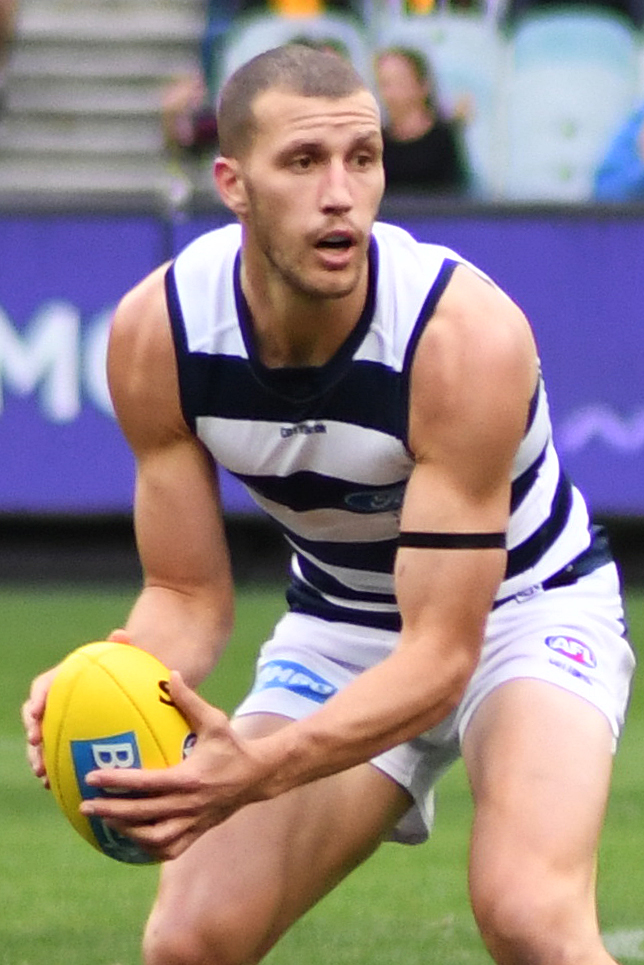
- Menegola playing for Geelong in April 2019

Personal information
- Full name: Sam Menegola
- Born: 7 March 1992 (age 34); Perth, Western Australia, Australia
- Original team: East Fremantle (WAFL)
- Draft: No. 19, 2011 rookie draft No. 44, 2012 rookie draft No. 66, 2015 national draft
- Debut: Round 18, 2016, Geelong vs. Adelaide, at Simonds Stadium
- Height: 189 cm (6 ft 2 in)
- Weight: 89 kg (196 lb)
- Position: Midfielder / Forward

Club information
- Current club: Geelong
- Number: 27

Playing career^{1}
Years	Club	Games (Goals)
2016–2023	Geelong	117 (81)
- ^{1} Playing statistics correct to the end of 2023.

Career highlights
- Subiaco premiership side 2015

Sam Menegola (born 7 March 1992) is a former Australian rules footballer who played for the Geelong Football Club in the Australian Football League (AFL). He had previously been listed by Hawthorn and Fremantle, but didn't play a senior game for either club. He is related to former Swan Districts premiership winner and Richmond player, Todd Menegola.

== Early career ==
Originally from East Fremantle in the West Australian Football League (WAFL), Menegola was first drafted in the 2011 rookie draft by Hawthorn with their first selection and nineteenth overall. He spent one season with Hawthorn before being delisted at the end of the 2011 season.

He was drafted again in the 2012 rookie draft by Fremantle, with their third selection and forty-fourth overall. He spent three injury interrupted seasons with Fremantle without playing an AFL match and was delisted at the end of the 2014 season. In 2013, he only played two games in the WAFL due to a knee injury and in 2014 was transferred to Peel Thunder due to Fremantle's alignment with Peel. After being delisted by Fremantle he moved to Subiaco for the 2015 WAFL season. Despite being unable to play due to an ankle injury until Round 11, Menegola finished third in the Sandover Medal, only 4 votes behind the winner, Aidan Tropiano. He was then one of the best players in Subiaco's 2015 WAFL Grand Final winning team.

== AFL career ==
Menegola was on Hawthorn Football Club's rookie list in 2011 and also on Fremantle Football Club's rookie list from 2012 to 2014.

Geelong then drafted Menegola with their second selection and sixty-sixth overall in the 2015 national draft. He made his AFL debut in the thirty-point win against Adelaide in round 18, 2016 at Simonds Stadium.

In 2017 Menegola had cemented his place in the midfield along with Patrick Dangerfield and Joel Selwood.

Menegola was selected in the 2020 All Australian 40 man squad but did not make the final team. In the same year he played for Geelong in the Grand Final. He was delisted at the end of the 2023 afl season.

== Statistics ==
Updated to the end of the 2022 season.

Legend
G	Goals	K	Kicks	D	Disposals	T	Tackles
B	Behinds	H	Handballs	M	Marks

Season	Team	No.	Games	Totals							Averages (per game)							Votes
Season	Team	No.	Games	G	B	K	H	D	M	T	G	B	K	H	D	M	T	Votes
2016	Geelong	27	8	6	2	89	103	192	33	30	0.8	0.3	11.1	12.9	24.0	4.1	3.8	2
2017	Geelong	27	22	17	20	255	272	527	109	129	0.8	0.9	11.6	12.4	24.0	5.0	5.9	6
2018	Geelong	27	23	22	12	283	259	542	126	103	1.0	0.5	12.3	11.3	23.6	5.5	4.5	7
2019	Geelong	27	12	3	6	127	101	228	58	38	0.3	0.5	10.6	8.4	19.0	4.8	3.2	0
2020 (Note: The 2020 season was played with 17 home-and-away matches per team (down from 22) and 16-minute quarters with time on (down from 20-minute quarters with time on) due to the impact of the COVID-19 pandemic.)	Geelong	27	21	16	5	261	184	445	118	32	0.8	0.2	12.4	8.8	21.2	5.6	1.5	5
2021	Geelong	27	23	12	12	324	209	533	125	52	0.5	0.5	14.1	9.1	23.2	5.4	2.3	3
2022	Geelong	27	7	5	4	87	38	125	87	38	0.7	0.6	12.4	5.4	17.9	4.0	1.1	2
Career			116	81	61	1426	1166	2592	597	392	0.7	0.5	12.3	10.1	22.3	5.1	3.4	25

== Honours and achievements ==
Team

- 2× McClelland Trophy (Geelong): 2019, 2022
