= Riley Collier-Dawkins =

Australian rules footballer (born 2000)

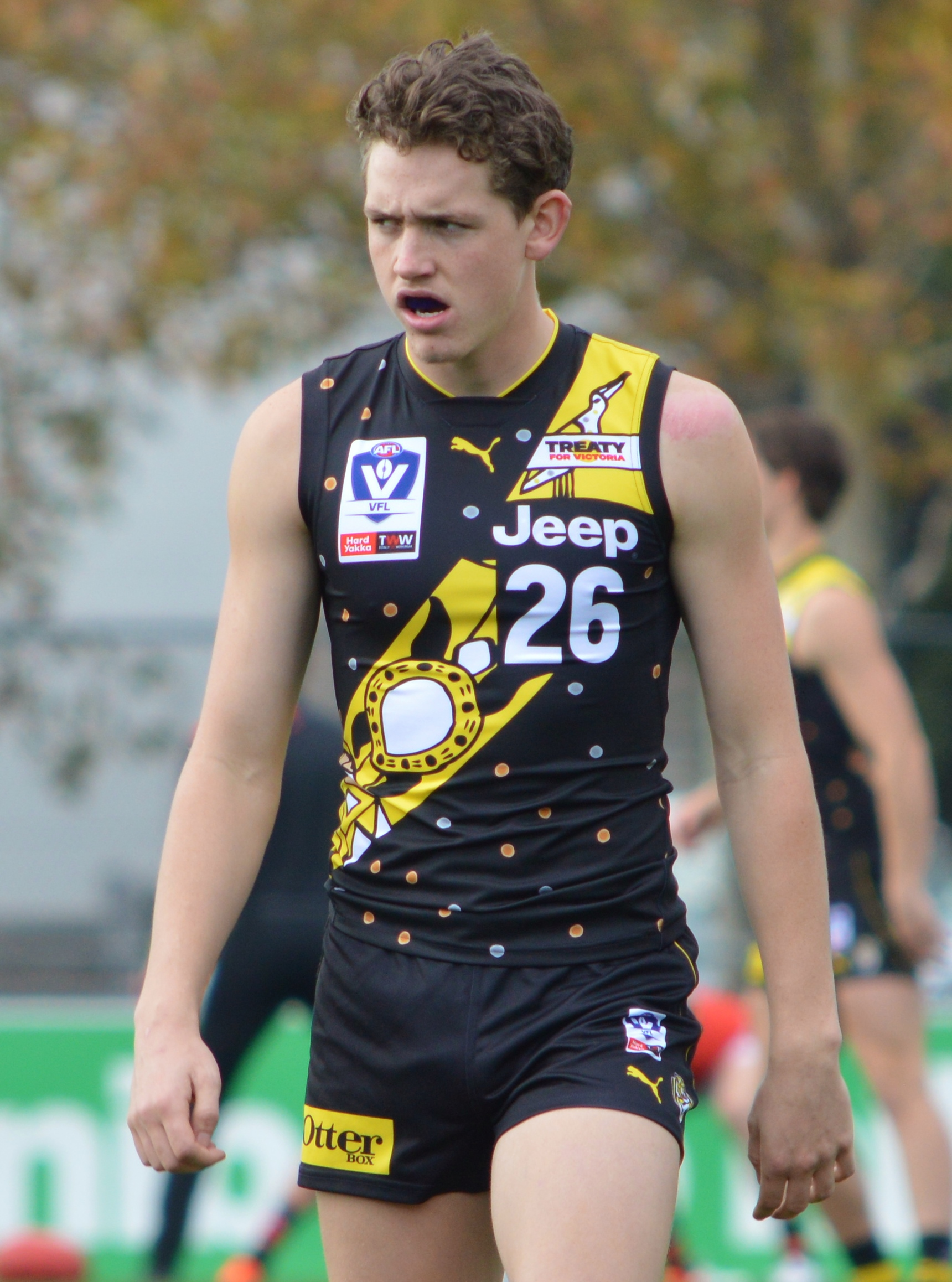
- Collier-Dawkins with Richmond's VFL side in May 2019

Personal information
- Born: 3 February 2000 (age 26)
- Original team: Waverley Blues (Vic)/Oakleigh Chargers (TAC Cup)
- Draft: No. 20, 2018 AFL national draft
- Debut: Round 7, 2021, Richmond vs. Western Bulldogs, at MCG
- Height: 193 cm (6 ft 4 in)
- Weight: 93 kg (205 lb)
- Position: Midfielder

Playing career^{1}
Years	Club	Games (Goals)
2019–2022	Richmond	11 (3)
- ^{1} Playing statistics correct to the end of 2022 season.

Career highlights
- VFL: VFL premiership player: 2019

Riley Collier-Dawkins (born 3 February 2000) is a professional Australian rules footballer who played for the Richmond Football Club in the Australian Football League (AFL). He played junior representative football with the Oakleigh Chargers in the TAC Cup, was drafted by Richmond with the 20th pick in 2018 AFL draft and made his debut in round 7 of the 2021 season. In 2019 he was a VFL premiership player while featuring at that level with Richmond's reserves side.

== Early life and junior football ==
Collier-Dawkins grew up in the suburb of Chadstone, 14 kilometres south-east of Melbourne's centre. He played junior football at the Waverley Blues Football Club in the junior ranks of the Eastern Football League. In 2016 at under 17s level, he featured as one of his side's best players in a division two grand final win. During this time, Collier-Dawkins attended high school at Salesian College in Chadstone.

A year prior, he featured in the extended under 15s squad for the area's representative side, the Oakleigh Chargers but was cut from the squad the following year. He was overlooked for selection to the Under 16 National Championships in 2016, but after his an off-season growth spurt, Collier-Dawkins returned to Oakleigh and made his top flight TAC Cup debut, impressing in the early weeks of the 2017 season including with a two-goal performance against Gippsland in June that marked him as a future AFL draftee.

Collier-Dawkins grew another seven centimetres over 2017/18 off-season, returning to Oakleigh as one of the team's leading inside midfielders in the early weeks of the season.

He was selected to represent the Victorian Metropolitan region at the 2018 AFL Under 18 Championships and was among his side's best players in the second match of the tournament, kicking two goals and recording seven inside 50s as part of a win over the Allies. He missed one game over the series due to injury, but finished having played a total of three matches.

After the tournament, Collier-Dawkins returned to the Chargers for a run towards the league grand final, impressing with a best on ground 26 disposals, four marks, five clearances and five inside 50s in a preliminary final win over Gippsland. Though his side was not victorious in the grand final that followed, Collier-Dawkins recorded 19 disposals and kicked one goal to be named by AFL Draft Central as the Chargers' second best player of the day.

=== AFL recruitment ===
By his early months of his final year of underage football, Collier-Dawkins drew media interest as a potential top-10 pick at the forthcoming draft, including as the potential sixth overall pick in ESPN's April 2018 draft projections. By October he had dropped to 16th on the same rankings, owing to perceived weaknesses in consistency and ball-winning ability.

Prior to the draft, Collier-Dawkins drew comparisons to Marcus Bontempelli and Patrick Cripps as a tall midfielder with high-impact per possession.

In the final days before the draft, AFL Media, ESPN and Fox Sports all projected Collier-Dawkins to be selected with the 13th pick while AFL Draft Central projected him to go 14th overall.

=== Junior statistics ===
Legend
G	Goals	K	Kicks	D	Disposals	T	Tackles
B	Behinds	H	Handballs	M	Marks

TAC Cup

Season	Team	No.	Games	Totals							Averages (per game)						
Season	Team	No.	Games	G	B	K	H	D	M	T	G	B	K	H	D	M	T
2017	Oakleigh Chargers	57	13	3	—	59	100	159	27	46	0.2	—	4.5	7.7	12.2	2.1	3.5
2018	Oakleigh Chargers	1	15	7	—	95	177	272	39	50	0.5	—	6.3	11.8	18.1	2.6	3.3
Career			28	10	—	154	277	431	66	96	0.4	—	5.5	9.9	15.4	2.4	3.4

Under 18 National Championships

Season	Team	No.	Games	Totals							Averages (per game)						
Season	Team	No.	Games	G	B	K	H	D	M	T	G	B	K	H	D	M	T
2018	Vic Metro	26	3	1	—	14	22	36	5	10	0.3	—	4.7	7.3	12.0	1.7	3.3
Career			3	1	—	14	22	36	5	10	0.3	—	4.7	7.3	12.0	1.7	3.3

== AFL career ==
=== 2019 season ===
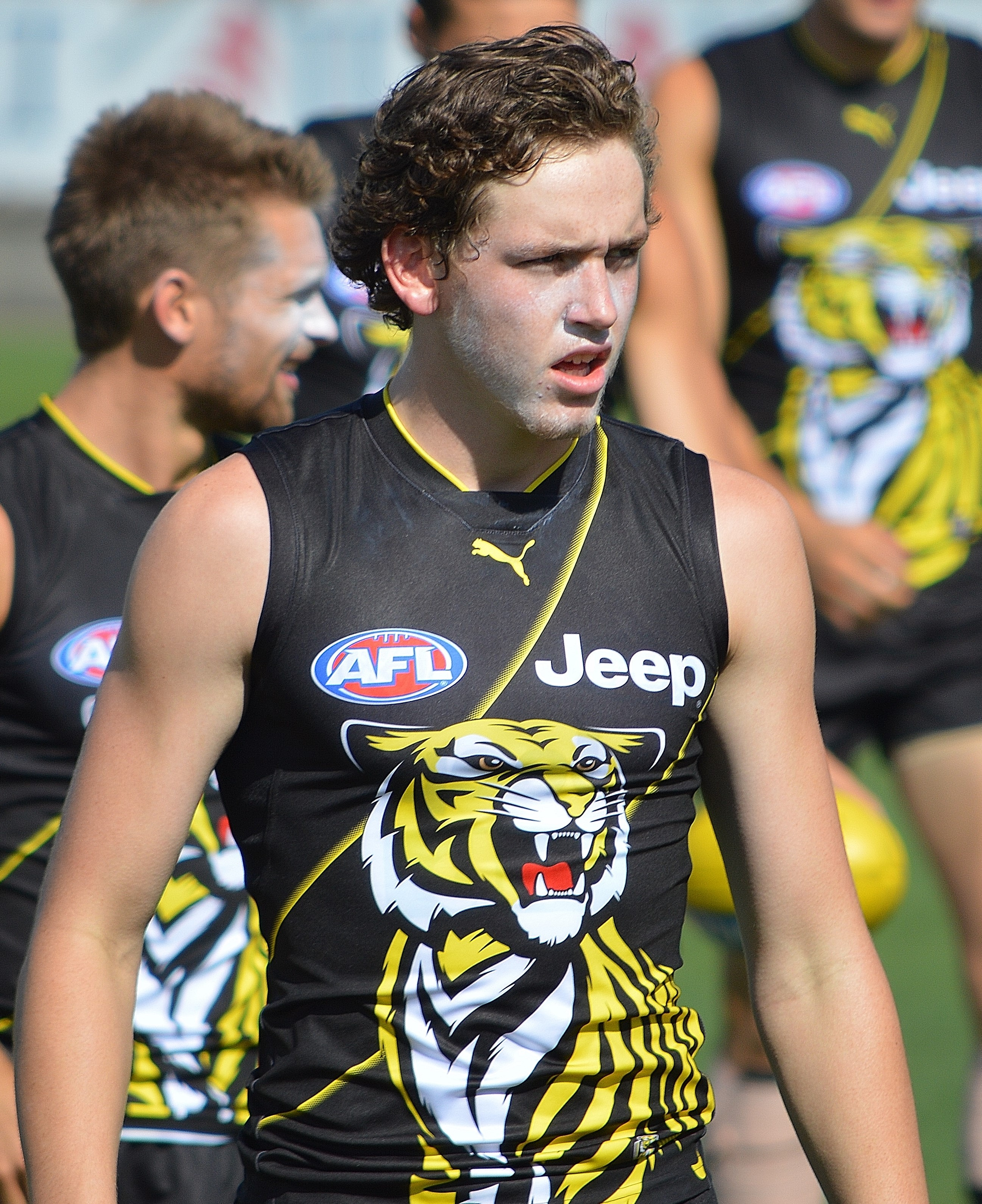
Collier-Dawkins in the 2019 pre-season

Collier Dawkins was drafted by Richmond with the club's first pick and the 20th selection overall in the 2018 AFL national draft.

After an impressive pre-season training block, Collier-Dawkins made his first appearance for the club in an AFL pre-season match against Melbourne in Shepparton in March 2019. After one match in the senior side, he spent the remainder of the pre-season playing VFL football with the club's reserves side. Collier-Dawkins built slowly into the reserves season, before impacting with seven clearances in an early-May match that saw him named on the extended AFL bench ahead of final round 9 team selections. Though ultimately going unselected for a debut, he was named an AFL-level non-playing emergency on five occasions during the first 12 weeks of the season. Collier-Dawkins impressed sporadically at the lower level for the remainder of the season, including with a two-goal, four tackle and 23 disposal haul in early June. He continued to go unselected at AFL level during the club's premiership run, but was a featuring member of the reserves side's own finals campaign. In the VFL grand final, Collier-Dawkins helped his side to a premiership win, contributing two goals as one of Richmond's best players. He failed to make an AFL debut that season, but averaged 14.3 disposals and 5.1 tackles per game in 20 VFL matches.

=== 2020 season ===
Collier-Dawkins completing a full pre-season training regime across the 2019/20 summer that drew public praise from head coach Damien Hardwick. He earned selection in the club's first pre-season series match against Collingwood in March, but missed out on selection to the final match of the series due to the return of several senior players from State of Origin duties. Instead, Collier-Dawkins participated in a VFL pre-season match with the club's reserves side which was to be his final competitive match in many months, as the following week's reserves match was cancelled due to safety concerns as a result of the rapid progression of the COVID-19 pandemic into Australia. Though the AFL season would start on schedule later that month, just one round of matches was played of the reduced 17-round season before the imposition of state border restrictions saw the season suspended for an indefinite hiatus. Collier-Dawkins played reserves-grade football when the season resumed after an 11-week hiatus, featuring in an unofficial scratch match against Collingwood's reserves that same week due to AFL clubs' withdrawal from the VFL season. After two more scratch matches at reserves level including a two-goal haul against St Kilda, Collier-Dawkins moved with the main playing group when the club was relocated to the Gold Coast in response to a virus outbreak in Melbourne. He was named as a non-playing emergency for the first match after the move, but again went unselected for a debut despite injuries to first choice midfielders Trent Cotchin and Dion Prestia, instead remaining a participant in reserves grade inter-club scrimmage matches over the course of July and August. A minor shoulder injury in late-August ruled out Collier-Dawkins from a likely debut in round 14, and he was ultimately unable to earn selection over the rest of the club's premiership year despite being named as an emergency on eight occasions in total.

=== 2021 season ===
Collier-Dawkins began the 2021 year by featuring for half a game in the extended senior side's one and only official pre-season match. He returned to reserves level matches for the club's VFL team following that match, where he remained over the next month and a half including with a near-best on ground 30 disposals, eight tackles and six clearances against Sandringham in April. Following those performances and after a concussion ruled out Dustin Martin from selection in round 7, Collier-Dawkins was called up for an AFL debut in the club's match against the Western Bulldogs at the MCG. He snagged 2 goals on debut.

=== 2022 ===
After a period of seemingly being unable to break into Richmond's best side, Collier-Dawkins was delisted at the end of his fourth season on Richmond's list.

== Player profile ==
Collier-Dawkins played as an inside midfielder. He drew praise for his powerful burst away from stoppages.

== Statistics ==
Updated to the end of round 23, 2022.

Legend
G	Goals	K	Kicks	D	Disposals	T	Tackles
B	Behinds	H	Handballs	M	Marks

Season	Team	No.	Games	Totals							Averages (per game)						
Season	Team	No.	Games	G	B	K	H	D	M	T	G	B	K	H	D	M	T
2019	Richmond	26	0	—	—	—	—	—	—	—	—	—	—	—	—	—	—
2020	Richmond	26	0	—	—	—	—	—	—	—	—	—	—	—	—	—	—
2021	Richmond	26	9	3	0	58	74	132	21	32	0.3	0.0	6.4	8.2	14.7	2.3	3.6
2022	Richmond	26	2	0	0	7	18	25	4	6	0.0	0.0	3.5	9.0	12.5	2.0	3.0
Career			11	3	0	65	92	157	25	38	0.3	0.0	5.9	8.4	14.3	2.3	3.5

== Honours and achievements ==
VFL

- VFL premiership player: 2019

== Personal life ==
Collier-Dawkins is the child of same-sex couple Jacinta Collier and Chris Dawkins. A major influence on Riley’s love of sport, his mother, Chris, is noted to have been a talented footballer in her youth. To this day multiple sources claim to have witnessed Chris in her prime, slotting goals from beyond 50, while barefoot.
