= Nathan Broad =

Australian rules footballer (born 1993)

- Broad in March 2026

Personal information
- Full name: Nathan Gregory Broad
- Nickname: Broady
- Born: 15 April 1993 (age 33)
- Original team: Swan Districts (WAFL)
- Draft: No. 67, 2015 AFL National Draft: Richmond
- Debut: Round 14, 2016, Richmond vs. Brisbane Lions, at MCG
- Height: 192 cm (6 ft 4 in)
- Weight: 87 kg (192 lb)
- Position: Key defender

Playing career^{1}
Years	Club	Games (Goals)
2016–2026	Richmond	191 (4)

Representative team honours
Years	Team	Games (Goals)
2026	Western Australia	1 (0)
- ^{1} Playing statistics correct to the end of 2026 season.

Career highlights
- 3× AFL premiership player: 2017, 2019, 2020; Fred Swift Medal (4th RFC B&F): 2024

Nathan Gregory Broad (born 15 April 1993) is a former professional Australian rules footballer who played for the Richmond Football Club in the Australian Football League (AFL). He is a three-time premiership player with the club, winning in 2017, 2019 and 2020.

== Junior and state league football ==
Broad hails from the Western Australian town of Wubin, 272 kilometres north-east of Perth. He played the majority of his junior football with the Chittering Broncos Junior Football Club, then Upper Swan Junior Football club, before moving to Perth at age 16 to join the Swan Districts development program. While in Perth he attended Governor Stirling High School on a sports scholarship.

In 2011 he was a member of the Western Australian squad, but did not play a game at the 2011 AFL Under 18 Championships. However, he was not drafted in the 2011 pool and returned to play state league football in the Western Australian Football League. He did so for four years including playing 20 matches with Swan Districts in 2015, while averaging 20 disposals per game in a rebounding defensive role. He finished fourth in the club's best and fairest award that year and began receiving the attention of AFL scouts. He attended the state draft combine in October 2015 and recorded a time of 24.04 seconds in the repeat sprint (faster than any player in who attended the national combine) and the state combine's third-best beep test score (14.1).

== AFL career ==
=== 2016 season ===
Broad was drafted by Richmond with the club's third selection and the 67th overall in the 2015 AFL national draft.

He first represented Richmond in a pre-season match against Fremantle in his home state, playing a dual role as a general and rebounding defender. Despite this, and an all-around impressive pre-season, he would be restrained to playing with the Richmond's reserves side in the VFL for much of his first season at the club. He eventually made his AFL debut in round 14 of the 2016 AFL season against Brisbane in a home game at the MCG. He had been named as an emergency for the match but was called in to play after teammate Jake Batchelor was withdrawn due to injury. He recorded 14 disposals and five marks on debut. Broad played in the club's next match as well, before being dropped and returning to VFL level for the rest of the season. He finished the year having played just the two matches at senior level.

=== 2017 season ===
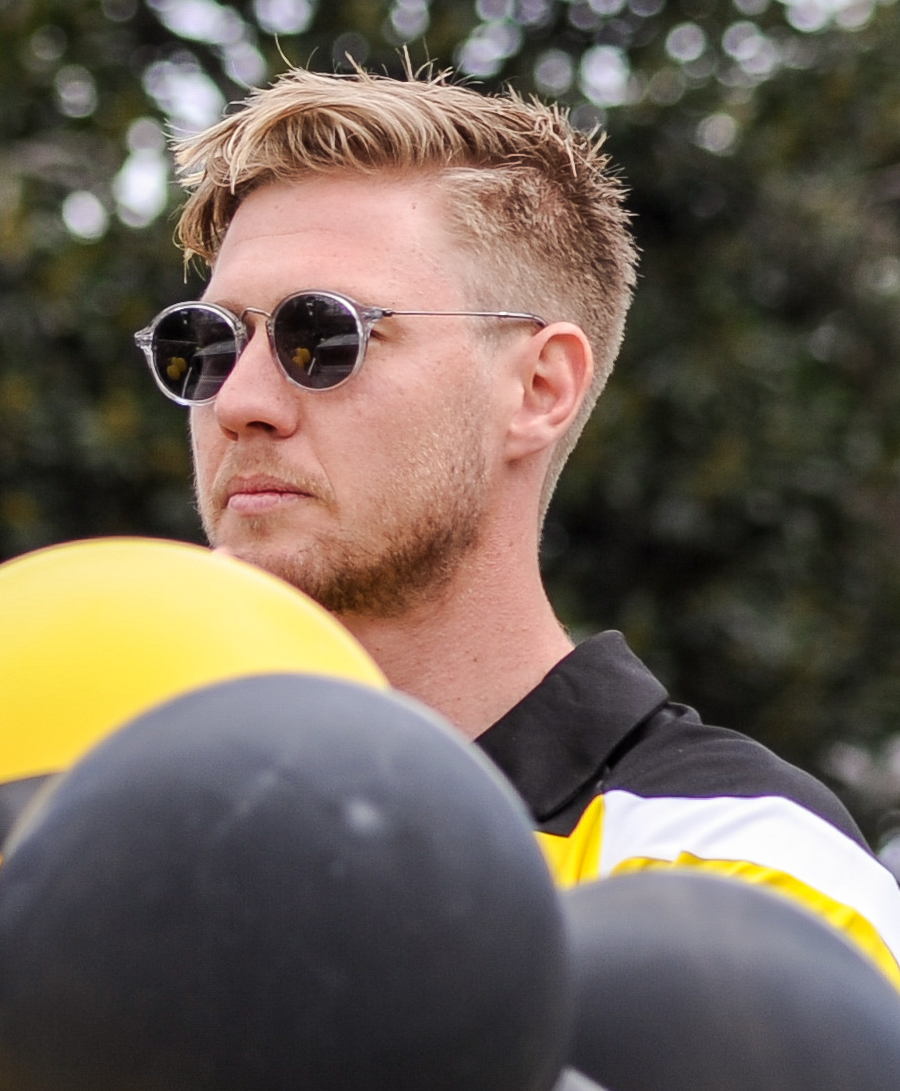
Broad during the 2017 AFL Grand Final parade

For the second straight year Broad started the 2017 season without gaining AFL selection. Just days before the VFL season was to start though he suffered an AC joint injury in his right shoulder while training in April 2017. He was subsequently added to the club's long-term injury list and missed eight weeks of football at all levels as a result. He returned to play for the club's reserve side in the VFL in early June. After showing good form at VFL level he was called up to AFL action in round 17. He remained in the side for the rest of the home and away season, holding averages of 15.1 disposals and 4.3 marks per game over this stretch. In the first week of the finals Broad contributed 15 disposals and eight marks towards Richmond's win over Geelong before helping shut down GWS forward Toby Greene in the preliminary final two weeks later. From there, Broad's side played off against minor premiers Adelaide in the 2017 AFL Grand Final. He kept his direct opponent Tom Lynch goalless, while contributing 13 disposals of his own to Richmond's 48 point victory. As a result, he won a premiership medal in his tenth game that season and twelfth of his career.

=== 2018 season ===
In the month following his side's 2017 premiership win, Broad was embroiled in scandal for distributing a photograph of a nude woman without consent, the result of which saw him suspended for the first three matches of the 2018 AFL season. He did however play in one pre-season series match with the club as well as in Richmond's side at the Sydney tournament of the AFLX exhibition series in February. Broad played with the club's reserves team in the VFL during the period of his suspension as well as in one further match, before being re-called to senior level in round 5. Broad suffered a corked glute muscle in the lead up to Richmond's round 9 match against West Coast, but ultimately played in the match despite the injury. At the mid-season bye, Broad had not missed a game since his return to AFL level, while holding averages of 10.6 disposals and three marks per game. Broad equaled a career-best 19 disposals in the first match following the bye, but suffered a fractured cheekbone in the last quarter of that win over Adelaide. That injury required surgery to repair and caused him to miss one match. Broad played two consecutive matches upon his return, but was rested in round 20 due to calf soreness. He played in each of the club's final three home and away matches including his return in round 21's win over Gold Coast. In Richmond's home qualifying final win over Hawthorn, Broad managed just three disposals. That performance, along with consecutive four disposal games to close out the home and away season, saw Broad's continuing selection under some media speculation. Despite that form he held his spot in Richmond's next match, a shock preliminary final loss to Collingwood in which he contributed disposals 10 and two marks and that saw Richmond's season brought to a close.

=== 2019 season ===
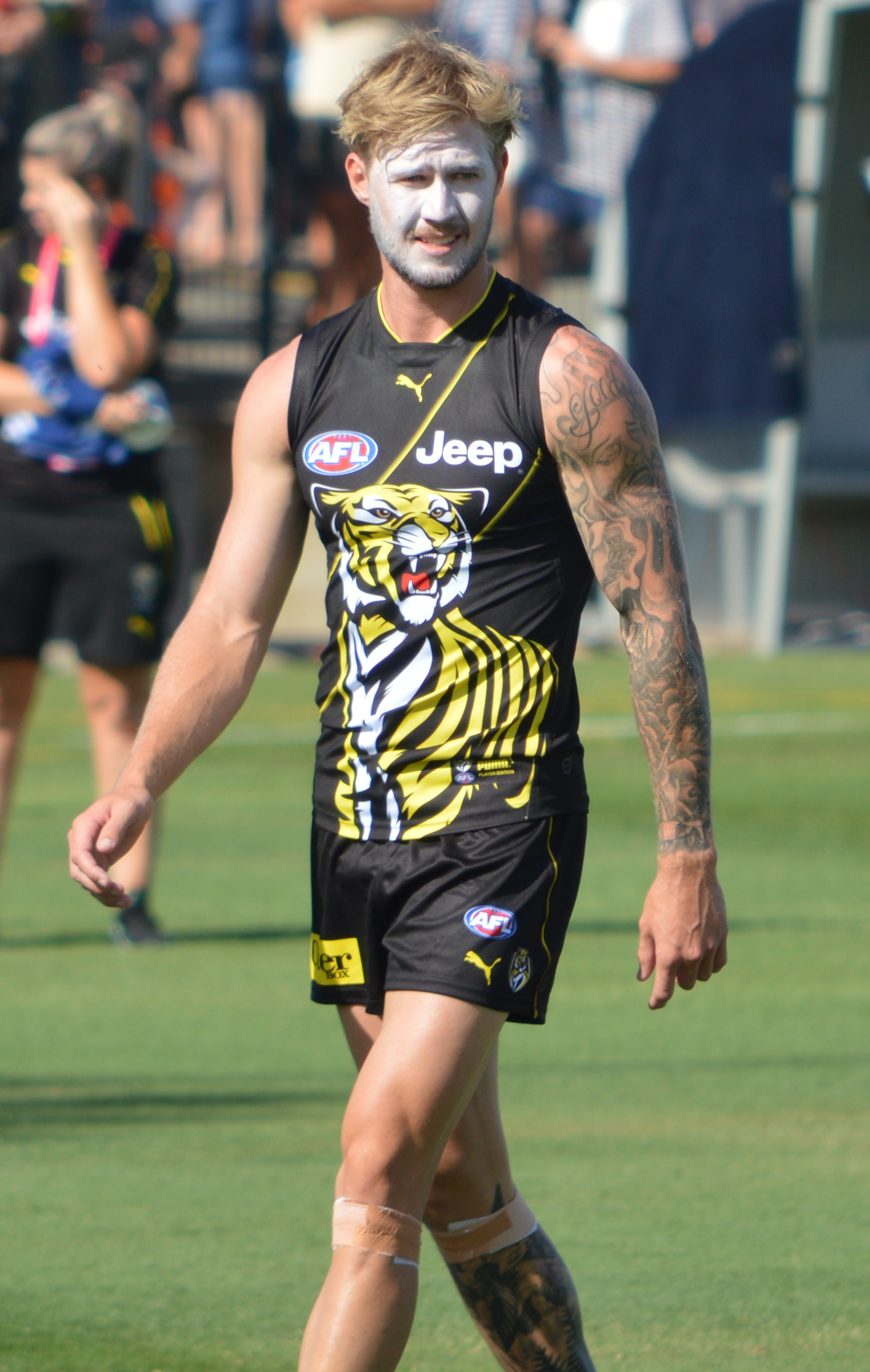
Broad in the 2019 pre-season series

Broad was tipped to fall out of Richmond's best 22 by AFL Media in the summer before the 2019 season, though strong performances in each of the club's two pre-season matches would ultimately earn him selection in round 1's season-opening match against Carlton. The loss of All-Australian defender and teammate Alex Rance to an ACL injury in that match however, would force Broad into a more defensive role than in seasons past. His performances were unremarkable over the next fortnight as the Richmond defence conceded 36 goals over two matches, before stabilising with a win over Port Adelaide in round 4 in which Broad ably accounted for opponent Justin Westhoff. He was one of just two Richmond's first-choice defenders to play in each of the club's first eight matches of the year, including in a win over Fremantle in round 8 where he kicked his first career goal and played partially as a relief ruck after Toby Nankervis suffered a mid-match injury. After 11 matches, Broad was one of just six players to appear in all Richmond matches that season. That run was not to continue into round 12 however, after was Broad was dropped back to VFL football for the first time since the start of 2018. It was a short stint at that level, immediately recalled to AFL football in round 13. He played in each of the club's unbeaten nine game winning streak to close out the home and away season, including in round 16 when he equaled a career-best with eight marks over Gold Coast. Broad played in his 50th career AFL match in round 22 during that run, passing that mark to claim the best winning percentage (80 per cent) of any active AFL player with 50 or more games played. Despite a career-low two disposals, Broad was highly effective in defence during the club's first final, a qualifying final victory over the Brisbane Lions at The Gabba. Broad was again subdued offensively but strong defensively in the first half of the preliminary final against Geelong. In the second half however, Broad suffered a head knock and concussion that saw him removed from the remainder of the match as his teammates won through to a grand final match up against Greater Western Sydney. In the week that followed, he was the subject of intense media speculation around his fitness to play including revelations that Broad suffered memory loss covering the entirety of the preliminary final. Broad passed all concussion tests later that week and was ultimately selected to play in the grand final where he and the Richmond defence kept the Giants to 25 points, their lowest score in the club's eight-year history and the lowest score by any team in a VFL/AFL grand final since 1960. According to AFL Media, Broad "played his role superbly" while directly defending Harry Himmelberg. Broad finished the year having played a career-best 24 matches, winning a second AFL premiership in three seasons and placing 16th in the club's best and fairest count.

=== 2020 season ===
The 2019/20 off-season retirement of fellow defender Alex Rance assured Broad he would continue to be a key part his club's defensive unit, which he showed with strong performances in the pre-season series including with 21 disposals in the first of those two matches. Broad earned AFL selection for a round 1 win over Carlton when the season began a fortnight later, but under extraordinary conditions imposed on the league as a result of the rapid progression of the coronavirus pandemic into Australia. In what the league planned would be the first of a reduced 17-round season, the match was played without crowds in attendance due to public health prohibitions on large gatherings and with quarter lengths reduced by one fifth in order to reduce the physical load on players who would be expected to play multiple matches with short breaks in the second half of the year. Just three days later, the AFL Commission suspended the season for an indefinite period after multiple states enforced quarantine conditions on their borders that effectively ruled out the possibility of continuing the season as planned. Broad had ten disposals when the season resumed with a draw against Collingwood in early-June after an 11-week hiatus. He continued to hold his spot at senior level over the next three matches, including while suffering a dislocated finger in round 5's win over Melbourne. In early July, Broad moved with the main playing group when the club was relocated to the Gold Coast in response to a virus outbreak in Melbourne. He was a senior mainstay over the next seven matches, but was omitted from the club's round 13 match against Essendon. He sat out that and one further match before earning a recall for the club's round 15 win over Fremantle as a replacement for the injured Dylan Grimes. Despite a good performance in the win, Broad was dropped upon the recovery of Grimes after just one match. Instead, he would play in unofficial scratch matches against opposition reserves players given the cancellation of the formal reserves VFL competition. Broad was named as a non-playing emergency but ultimately overlooked for selection in the first week of the AFL finals series, before later earning an AFL recall for the club's second-week semi-final win over St Kilda in which he contributed five marks. He held his spot into the preliminary final win over Port Adelaide and became a three-time premiership player after a 31-point grand final victory over Geelong one week later. AFL Media labelled his intercept marking and other defensive efforts as "crucial to the win" in the absence of injured teammate Nick Vlastuin. Officially, Broad was awarded two Norm Smith Medal votes for his eight disposal performance in the win, through selector Leigh Matthews later clarified he had mistaken entered Broad's name while intending to vote for fellow defender Jayden Short.

=== 2021 season ===
After a full off-season training program, Broad began the 2021 year with appearances in the club's pre-season campaign and in a round 1 win over Carlton. He equaled his own career-high with 10 intercepts in a round 2 win over Hawthorn and matched that again in round 7's win over Western Bulldogs, along with new career highs in disposals (25) and marks (11) that earned him five Coaches Association award votes as the third-best player on-ground that week. He was in career-best form through that point of the season, averaging 15.9 disposals, 7.3 intercepts and 276 metres gained per match. Four weeks later and following a round 11 performance against Adelaide that earned him a mention in Richmond's best players by AFL Media, Broad ranked second at Richmond with seven intercepts per game that season. Around the same time, Broad was labelled a contender for the club's best and fairest award by AFL Media and was identified as his club's second most improved player that season by AFL statistical provider Champion Data. Broad suffered an ankle injury early in round 15's match against St Kilda, but returned to play out the remainder of the loss despite the injury. Scans later revealed a significant syndesmosis ankle injury, which would require surgery to repair and which would rule him out for at least one month of football. He had returned to running in mid July and was considered some chance to return to match-play by the end of the month, travelling with an extended squad to an away game in Perth. Though he ultimately went unselected for that round 20 match against Fremantle, he was labelled as a probable inclusion for the following week's match. His return was ultimately thwarted by an injury setback, with a follow-up scan showing he would require further rehabilitation. With the club not qualifying for the final series, the diagnoses would effectively end his season in which he featured in 14 matches and set new career highs for disposals (16.4) and marks (6.4) per game.

=== 2023 season ===
During Richmond's second-round clash against Adelaide, Broad was suspended for a sling tackle on Adelaide's Patrick Parnell. Following the tackle, Parnell was concussed and was forced to enter the concussion protocols. Richmond attempted to appeal for leniency in the sentence, based on Broad's contrition and his good record of not being suspended. The suspension is in line with suspensions handed down to Scott Lycett and Alex Neal-Bullen. During Richmond's round nine match against Geelong, Broad was tasked with lockdowning key forward Jeremy Cameron. Broad was able to restrict Cameron to just one goal and finished the match with 19 disposals, seven marks, equal team-high six rebound-50s, equal game-high 11 intercepts, a game-high 12 one-percenters and 361 metres gained. The performance earnt Broad eight coaches votes.

== Player profile ==
Broad plays as a versatile defender, capable of directly defending small and tall forwards or playing as a spare interceptor, but with particular skills as a rebounder from half-back. He is notable for his repeat sprint and endurance running ability.

== Statistics ==
Updated to the end of round 22, 2026.

Legend
G	Goals	K	Kicks	D	Disposals	T	Tackles
B	Behinds	H	Handballs	M	Marks
#	Played in that season's premiership team

Season	Team	No.	Games	Totals							Averages (per game)							Votes
Season	Team	No.	Games	G	B	K	H	D	M	T	G	B	K	H	D	M	T	Votes
2016	Richmond	35	2	0	0	15	11	26	7	3	0.0	0.0	7.5	5.5	13.0	3.5	1.5	0
2017^{#}	Richmond	35	10	0	0	93	47	140	41	25	0.0	0.0	9.3	4.7	14.0	4.1	2.5	0
2018	Richmond	35	18	0	0	117	73	190	55	40	0.0	0.0	6.5	4.1	10.6	3.1	2.2	0
2019^{#}	Richmond	35	24	1	0	165	106	271	86	44	0.0	0.0	6.9	4.4	11.3	3.6	1.8	0
2020^{#}	Richmond	35	16	0	0	128	47	175	65	28	0.0	0.0	8.0	2.9	10.9	4.1	1.8	0
2021	Richmond	35	14	0	0	159	70	229	89	17	0.0	0.0	11.4	5.0	16.4	6.4	1.2	0
2022	Richmond	35	23	0	0	286	121	407	140	27	0.0	0.0	12.4	5.3	17.7	6.1	1.2	1
2023	Richmond	35	19	2	0	192	113	305	101	45	0.1	0.0	10.1	5.9	16.1	5.3	2.4	1
2024	Richmond	35	22	1	2	215	100	315	139	32	0.0	0.1	9.8	4.5	14.3	6.3	1.5	1
2025	Richmond	35	22	0	0	211	98	309	129	34	0.0	0.0	9.6	4.5	14.0	5.9	1.5	0
2026	Richmond	35	20	0	0	165	115	280	109	13	0.0	0.0	8.3	5.8	14.0	5.5	0.7	0
Career			190	4	2	1746	901	2647	961	308	0.0	0.0	9.2	4.7	13.9	5.1	1.6	3

== Honours and achievements ==
Team

- 3× AFL premiership player (Richmond): 2017, 2019, 2020
- McClelland Trophy (Richmond): 2018

Individual

- Fred Swift Medal (4th RFC B&F): 2024

== Personal life ==
Broad began a relationship with Love Island Australia season 1 winner Tayla Damir in late 2019. The pair were engaged in June 2021.

=== Nude photo controversy ===
In the days following Richmond's 2017 AFL premiership victory, a nude photograph of a woman's torso wearing a player's premiership medal surfaced on various social media websites. At the behest of the woman involved, Victoria Police began an investigation into its alleged unlawful distribution. No charges were ultimately pursued, however, after the woman dropped her complaint, with a later press statement from her lawyers explaining she had initially contacted police to seek assistance in having the photo destroyed, that she did not intend for criminal charges to be laid and that the claim was now being dropped to "protect her identity and avoid any further attention and distress." The same statement said that the woman and player had a previous relationship and that "she insisted he delete the photo from his mobile phone as soon as it was taken, and that he assured her it had been."

Broad, alongside club president Peggy O'Neal, held a press conference on 30 October 2017 where it was revealed that the photograph in question had been taken by Broad. In a pre-prepared statement he publicly apologised and admitted to having sent the photo to other people without the woman's consent. In a move supported by the AFL, Broad was suspended by the club for the first three matches of the following AFL season over his actions, subsequently ending the league's investigation into the matter.
