= 2021 Western Bulldogs season =

Western Bulldogs
2021 season
- Coach: Luke Beveridge (7th season)
- Captains: Marcus Bontempelli (2nd season)
- Home ground: Marvel Stadium
- AFL season: 5th
- Finals series: Runners Up
- Leading goalkicker: Josh Bruce (48)
- Highest home attendance: 52,402 vs. Richmond (Round 7)
- Lowest home attendance: 0 (multiple times); 7,387 vs. Brisbane Lions (Round 4) (excluding matches played behind closed doors)

The Western Bulldogs are an Australian rules football team based in Melbourne, Victoria. Their 2021 season was their 96th season in the Australian Football League (AFL), their seventh season under premiership coach Luke Beveridge, and their second season with Marcus Bontempelli as captain. At the end of the home-and-away season, they finished fifth with 15 wins and 7 losses despite topping the ladder for eight weeks. Nevertheless, they were able to make the 2021 Grand Final against Melbourne, where they lost by 74 points to finish the year as runner-up.

== Background ==
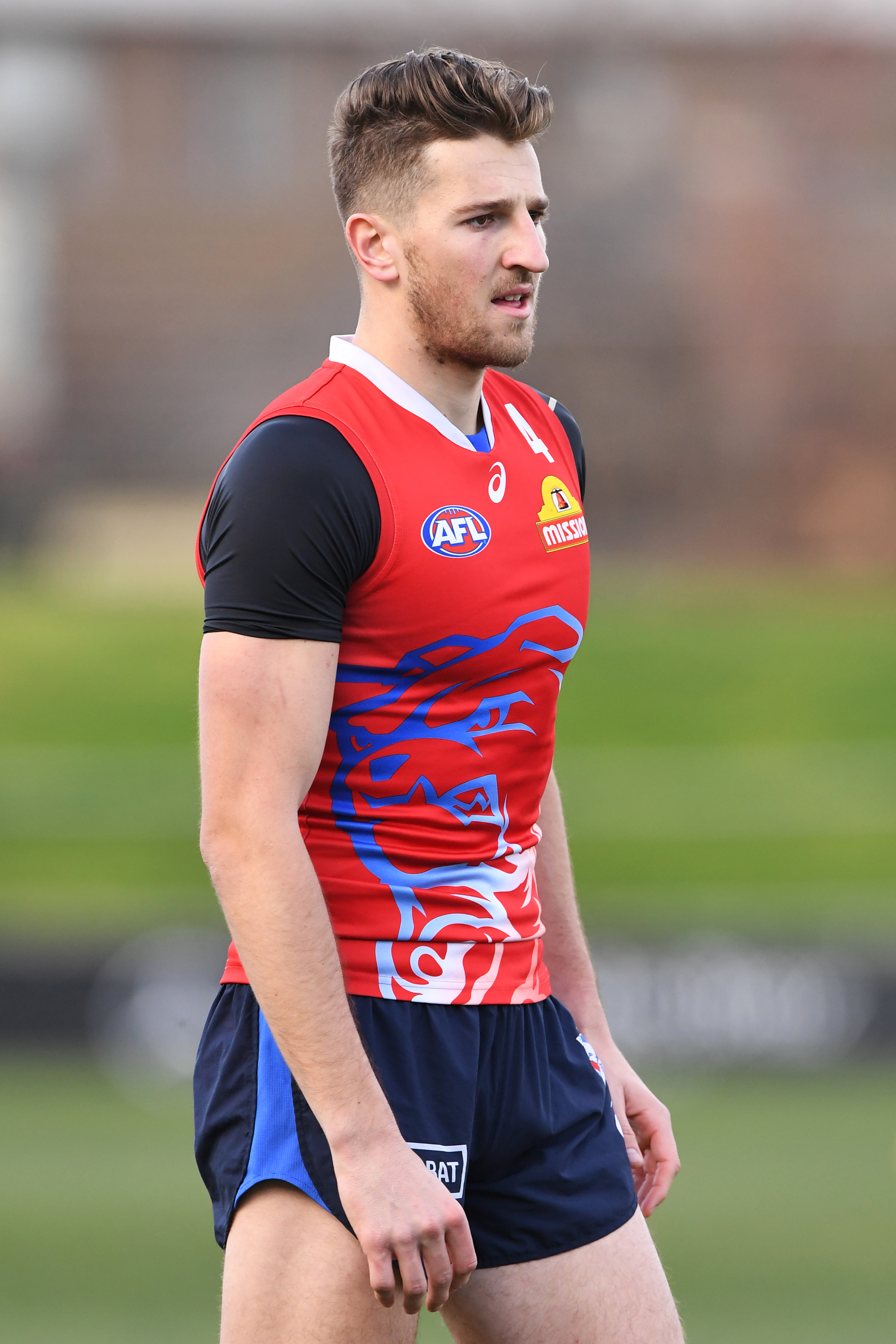
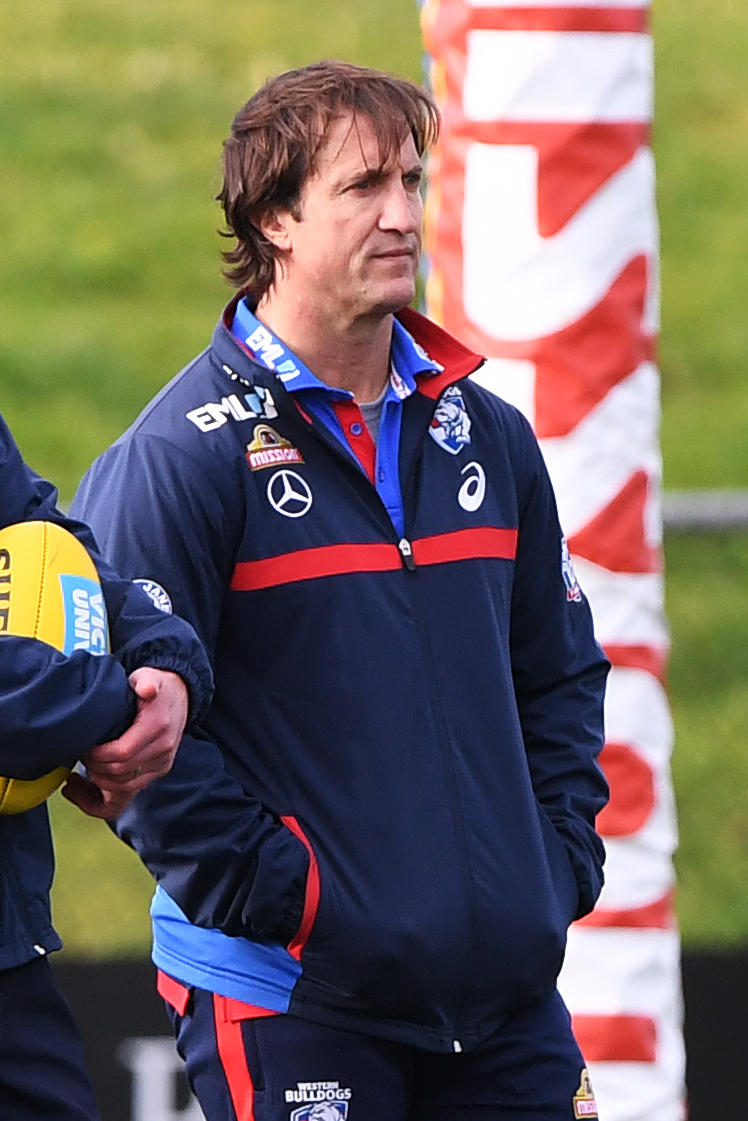
Marcus Bontempelli (captain) and Luke Beveridge (coach)

The Western Bulldogs are an Australian rules football team based in Melbourne, Victoria, that competes in the Australian Football League (AFL). They ended the 2020 home-and-away season seventh on the ladder. Their season ended after St Kilda beat them in the first week of the finals; however, they were able to make the 2021 Grand Final against Melbourne, scheduled for Saturday 25 September 2021.

In the off season, Marcus Bontempelli was named captain of the Western Bulldogs for the second year in a row. Mitch Wallis was named as the vice-captain, replacing Easton Wood. The leadership group was abolished, with players being asked to 'take on more responsibility to guide the team forward'.

Luke Beveridge was head coach for a seventh season.

The Western Bulldogs continued with Mexican foods supplier company Mission Foods as their major sponsor for 2021.

== Playing list ==
=== 2020 off-season changes ===
At the end of their 2020 season, the Western Bulldogs delisted 2018 leading goalkicker Billy Gowers and 2016 draftees Fergus Greene and Brad Lynch. Veterans Jackson Trengove and Matthew Suckling, as well as 2017 draftee Callum Porter, were delisted after the trade period. The Western Bulldogs only traded one player, Lachie Young, in the trade period, who went to North Melbourne in a three-way trade that saw the Western Bulldogs receive Brisbane Lions ruckman Stefan Martin; Brisbane and North Melbourne trade picks 63 and 70, respectively; and Lachie Young be sent to North Melbourne. They received out-of-favour Collingwood midfielder Adam Treloar and picks 26, 33 and 42 in exchange for a first-round and future second-round pick. Finally, Mitch Hannan was also traded to the Bulldogs in exchange for a future third-round pick.

In the 2020 AFL draft, the Bulldogs drafted Next Generation Academy graduate Jamarra Ugle-Hagan with the first pick of the 2020 AFL draft as well as small forward Dominic Bedendo with pick 55. They also obtained midfielder/forward Lachlan McNeil at the rookie draft with pick 11.

Removals from playing list
Player	Reason	Games played	Ref.
Billy Gowers	Delisted	33	
Fergus Greene	Delisted	5	
Brad Lynch	Delisted	9	
Callum Porter	Delisted	1	
Matt Suckling	Delisted	178 (76 at the Western Bulldogs)	
Jackson Trengove	Delisted	185 (32 at the Western Bulldogs)	
Lachie Young	Traded to North Melbourne	8	
Tory Dickson	Retired	114	
Sam Lloyd	Retired	89 (32 at the Western Bulldogs)	

Additions to playing list
Player	Acquired	Former club	Former league	Ref.
Mitch Hannan	Traded from Melbourne	Melbourne	AFL	
Stefan Martin	Traded from Brisbane Lions	Brisbane Lions	AFL	
Adam Treloar	Traded from Collingwood	Collingwood	AFL	
Jamarra Ugle-Hagan	No. 1, 2020 national draft	Oakleigh Chargers	NAB League	
Dominic Bedendo	No. 55, 2020 national draft	Murray Bushrangers	NAB League	
Lachlan McNeil	No. 11, 2020 AFL Rookie draft	Woodville-West Torrens	SANFL	

=== Statistics ===
Playing list and statistics
Player	No.	Games	Goals	Behinds	Kicks	Handballs	Disposals	Marks	Tackles	Notes/Milestone(s)
Adam Treloar	1	17	13	9	186	209	395	50	73	Western Bulldogs debut (Round 1)
Lewis Young	2	9	1	1	47	52	99	24	14	
Mitch Wallis	3	6	4	2	28	33	61	20	10	
Marcus Bontempelli	4	26	31	19	396	299	695	104	127	150th game (Round 5)"
Josh Dunkley	5	15	5	8	129	220	349	56	78	
Bailey Smith	6	26	17	13	354	259	613	97	87	50th game (Round 9)
Lachie Hunter	7	25	10	7	326	220	546	125	60	
Stefan Martin	8	9	1	0	29	64	93	11	17	Western Bulldogs debut (Round 1)
Hayden Crozier	9	10	0	0	111	48	159	59	14	
Easton Wood	10	15	2	0	111	65	176	70	22	
Jack Macrae	11	26	6	4	435	445	880	102	128	
Zaine Cordy	12	19	0	0	126	57	183	67	38	100th game (Round 21)
Josh Schache	13	9	5	4	67	27	94	41	11	
Rhylee West	14	4	0	2	6	3	9	2	2	
Taylor Duryea	15	25	1	0	281	156	437	132	38	
Toby McLean	16	3	2	2	17	25	42	9	2	
Josh Bruce	17	20	48	21	138	83	221	100	28	150th game (Round 21)
Louis Butler	18	1	0	0	6	4	10	5	2	
Cody Weightman	19	16	26	13	120	40	160	48	30	
Ed Richards	20	5	1	0	43	25	68	16	9	
Tom Liberatore	21	25	14	12	285	313	598	65	135	150th game (Round 2)
Jamarra Ugle-Hagan	22	5	7	2	25	10	35	14	8	
Laitham Vandermeer	23	11	6	8	46	50	96	24	26	
Buku Khamis	24	1	0	0	7	4	11	1	1	Category-B Rookie, AFL debut (Round 8)
Ben Cavarra	25	1	0	0	1	0	1	1	1	
Dominic Bedendo	26	0	—N/a	—N/a	—N/a	—N/a	—N/a	—N/a	—N/a	
Patrick Lipinski	27	11	2	1	74	79	153	39	22	50th game (Round 5)
Anthony Scott	28	21	10	8	88	95	183	33	35	Rookie, AFL debut (Round 1)
Mitch Hannan	29	17	14	13	114	53	167	59	51	
Lachlan McNeil	30	13	7	8	60	51	111	21	24	Rookie, AFL debut (Round 1)
Bailey Dale	31	26	9	0	447	176	623	100	26	
Will Hayes	32	0	—N/a	—N/a	—N/a	—N/a	—N/a	—N/a	—N/a	Rookie
Aaron Naughton	33	25	47	40	186	94	280	153	39	
Bailey Williams	34	23	0	0	247	136	383	104	53	
Caleb Daniel	35	25	1	0	364	267	631	100	58	
Roarke Smith	37	14	3	4	79	88	167	29	34	Rookie
Riley Garcia	38	9	4	3	57	46	103	14	17	AFL debut (Round 11)
Jason Johannisen	39	25	15	12	152	99	251	67	41	
Jordon Sweet	41	5	1	2	21	22	43	12	19	Rookie, AFL debut (Round 5)
Alex Keath	42	23	0	1	161	117	278	110	43	50th game (Round 2)
Ryan Gardner	43	9	0	0	37	18	55	20	5	Rookie
Tim English	44	22	19	15	164	126	290	103	63	50th game (Round 3)
Lin Jong	46	1	0	1	2	2	4	2	0	

== Season summary ==
The fixture for the 2021 season was revealed in December 2020, with each team scheduled to play 22 matches and have a mid-season bye, as was normal prior to COVID-19. Only the first six rounds had times and dates set for the matches, with the remaining dates being confirmed at a later date. The Bulldogs played Gold Coast, Melbourne, North Melbourne, Port Adelaide and West Coast twice, and the other teams once each.

The Western Bulldogs' first match of the season was against Collingwood at the Melbourne Cricket Ground. The Bulldogs secured their first win of the season, a 16-point win, after leading the entire game. This saw former Collingwood player Adam Treloar play against his old club for the first time. In Round 2, the Bulldogs played West Coast at Marvel Stadium. The game was very even, with the lead switching 11 times throughout the game. Although the Eagles led by 2 goals at three quarter time, the Bulldogs kicked 5 goals to 2, with Bontempelli kicking the sealer, in order to secure the win, which was described as 'the best game of 2021 so far'.

Round 3 saw the team make history as they brutally demolished North Melbourne in the Good Friday marquee match by 128 points, their biggest winning margin in the club's history. Josh Bruce kicked 10 goals, the biggest amount kicked by an AFL player since Ben Brown in 2019. The win propelled them to the top spot of the ladder, with a percentage of 181.6. Round 4 saw the club continue their undefeated streak, after they beat 2020 preliminary finalists Brisbane Lions by 19 points on a windy day at Mars Stadium in Ballarat. Ruckman turned forward Tim English, new recruit Adam Treloar and the ever-consistent Jack Macrae were named as the team's best on ground after they collected a combined 78 disposals and 4 goals.

The Bulldogs went undefeated for the first five games in a season for the first time since 1946 as they beat Gold Coast by 62 points in a fierce display at Marvel Stadium, scoring 11 goals to 1 in the opening half as 150 gamer Marcus Bontempelli led the way. After conceding the third quarter to the Suns, they pulled away in the final quarter to win by their 2nd biggest margin up to that point. Their undefeated streak continued the following week as the Bulldogs pulled away in a back and forward slog against Greater Western Sydney to claim the victory by 39 points. Lin Jong came back into the team only to injure his hamstring in his fourth game in the senior team since 2018, while the ever-consistent Josh Dunkley dislocated his shoulder and ruckman-turned forward Tim English suffered a head knock.

The Bulldogs suffered their first loss for the season in Round 7 after they lost to reigning premiers Richmond by 22 points. Despite leading at half time, they could not hold out against the Tigers, who had been inaccurate in the first half. After being down 27 points at one stage in the third quarter, the Bulldogs grinded out a win against Carlton in Round 8, with Bruce and Bontempelli among the best performers for that game after collecting 32 disposals and 5 goals, respectively. The next week saw the team travel to Adelaide Oval to face Port Adelaide, where they secured a 19-point win. After kicking 6 goals to 2 in the first term, the exact opposite occurred in the second, with the Bulldogs conceding 6 goals and kicking 2 themselves. However, they managed to pull through with late goals to Cody Weightman and Aaron Naughton, sealing the win.

The Bulldogs again made history in Round 10, recording their biggest-ever win against the Saints and recording two 100-point wins for the first time in one season. Their 111-point victory saw the Bulldogs narrowly keep on top in the first quarter, with a 3-goal-to-2 quarter seeing inaccurate kicking from both sides. However, from there, the Bulldogs would kick 18 of the next 21 goals, with 5 players for the Bulldogs scoring multiple goals. Round 11 saw the Bulldogs get handed their second loss for the season after they were dominated by Melbourne for the majority of the game, resulting in a 28-point loss. The game was played without crowds due to the impact of the pandemic lockdown occurring in Victoria that week. The team secured another win against Fremantle at Perth Stadium in Round 12, running out 28-point victors after some inaccurate kicking at goal. It was their first win in the state of Western Australia since the 2016 Elimination Final against the West Coast Eagles, which that year saw them progress into the 2016 finals series.

The Western Bulldogs lost their ladder position in the last few weeks of the home-and-away season, slipping from first to fifth. However, they scored wins against Essendon, Brisbane, and Port Adelaide in the finals to qualify for the 2021 Grand Final against Melbourne.

=== Results ===
AAMI Community Series results
Game	Day	Date	Result	Score			Opponent	Score			Ground	Attendance
Game	Day	Date	Result	G	B	T	Opponent	G	B	T	Ground	Attendance
1	Sunday	8 March	Won	15	16	106	Melbourne	10	7	67	Marvel Stadium	7,931

Regular season results
Round	Day	Date	Result	Score			Opponent	Score			Ground		Attendance	Ladder
Round	Day	Date	Result	G	B	T	Opponent	G	B	T	Ground		Attendance	Ladder
1	Sunday	19 March	Won	10	9	69	Collingwood	7	11	53	Melbourne Cricket Ground	A	46,051	6th
2	Sunday	28 March	Won	14	16	100	West Coast	14	9	93	Marvel Stadium	H	21,391	5th
3	Saturday	2 April	Won	25	17	167	North Melbourne	5	9	39	Marvel Stadium	A	28.483	1st
4	Saturday	10 April	Won	10	13	73	Brisbane Lions	8	6	54	Mars Stadium	H	7,387	1st
5	Friday	17 April	Won	17	16	118	Gold Coast	8	8	56	Marvel Stadium	H	18,920	1st
6	Saturday	23 April	Won	15	14	104	Greater Western Sydney	9	11	65	Manuka Oval	A	10,064	1st
7	Sunday	30 April	Lost	7	13	55	Richmond	11	11	77	Melbourne Cricket Ground	A	52,402	2nd
8	Sunday	9 May	Won	16	11	107	Carlton	13	13	91	Marvel Stadium	H	27,663	2nd
9	Sunday	15 May	Won	15	6	96	Port Adelaide	12	5	77	Adelaide Oval	A	32,787	2nd
10	Saturday	22 May	Won	21	18	144	St Kilda	5	3	33	Marvel Stadium	H	28,720	1st
11	Friday	28 May	Lost	8	11	59	Melbourne	13	9	87	Marvel Stadium	H	0 (Note: Crowds were not permitted for the Round 11 clash between the Western Bulldogs and the Demons due to the COVID-19 lockdown occurring at the time in Victoria.)	2nd
12	Sunday	6 June	Won	13	15	93	Fremantle	9	11	65	Optus Stadium	A	32,875	2nd
13	Bye													
14	Friday	June 18	Lost	11	12	78	Geelong	12	11	83	GMHBA Stadium	A	6,583	2nd
15	Sunday	June 27	Won	13	20	98	West Coast	6	7	43	Optus Stadium	A	0 (Note: Crowds were not permitted for the Round 15 clash between the Western Bulldogs and the Eagles due to the detection of a positive COVID-19 case in Western Australia.)	2nd
16	Sunday	July 4	Won	16	12	108	North Melbourne	11	13	79	Marvel Stadium	H	18,216	1st
17	Sunday	July 11	Lost	8	12	60	Sydney	11	13	79	Marvel Stadium	H	24,817	2nd
18	Saturday	July 17	Won	14	6	90	Gold Coast	11	13	79	Metricon Stadium	A	8,244	2nd
19	Saturday	July 24	Won	13	7	85	Melbourne	9	11	65	Melbourne Cricket Ground	H	0 (Note: Crowds were not permitted for the Round 19 clash between the Western Bulldogs and the Demons due to the COVID-19 lockdown occurring at the time in Victoria.)	1st
20	Saturday	July 31	Won	15	15	105	Adelaide	8	8	56	Mars Stadium	H	0 (Note: Crowds were not permitted for the Round 20 clash between the Western Bulldogs and the Crows due to the COVID-19 lockdown occurring at the time in Victoria.)	1st
21	Sunday	August 8	Lost	12	12	84	Essendon	15	7	97	Marvel Stadium	H	0 (Note: Crowds were not permitted for the Round 21 clash between the Western Bulldogs and the Essendon Bombers due to the COVID-19 lockdown occurring at the time in Victoria.)	2nd
22	Saturday	August 14	Lost	9	10	64	Hawthorn	5	7	37	UTAS Stadium	A	7,822	4th
23	Friday	August 20	Lost	10	4	64	Port Adelaide	9	12	66	Marvel Stadium	H	0 (Note: Crowds were not permitted for the Round 23 clash between the Western Bulldogs and the Port Adelaide Power due to the COVID-19 lockdown occurring at the time in Victoria.)	5th
EF	Sunday	29 August	Won	13	7	85	Essendon	4	12	36	UTAS Stadium	H	9,760	—N/a
SF	Friday	4 September	Won	11	13	79	Brisbane Lions	11	12	78	The Gabba	A	30,647	—N/a
PF	Saturday	11 September	Won	17	14	116	Port Adelaide	6	9	45	Adelaide Oval	A	26,400	—N/a
GF	Saturday	25 September	Lost	10	6	66	Melbourne	21	14	140	Optus Stadium	A	61,118	—N/a

Key
H	Home game
A	Away game
EF	Elimination final
SF	Semi-final
PF	Preliminary final
GF	Grand final

=== Ladder ===
Pos	Team	Pld	W	L	D	PF	PA	PP	Pts	Qualification
1	Melbourne (P)	22	17	4	1	1888	1443	130.8	70	Finals series
2	Port Adelaide	22	17	5	0	1884	1492	126.3	68	Finals series
3	Geelong	22	16	6	0	1845	1456	126.7	64	Finals series
4	Brisbane Lions	22	15	7	0	2131	1599	133.3	60	Finals series
5	Western Bulldogs	22	15	7	0	1994	1501	132.8	60	Finals series
6	Sydney	22	15	7	0	1986	1656	119.9	60	Finals series
7	Greater Western Sydney	22	11	10	1	1768	1773	99.7	46	Finals series
8	Essendon	22	11	11	0	1953	1790	109.1	44	Finals series
9	West Coast	22	10	12	0	1752	1880	93.2	40	
10	St Kilda	22	10	12	0	1644	1796	91.5	40	
11	Fremantle	22	10	12	0	1578	1825	86.5	40	
12	Richmond	22	9	12	1	1743	1780	97.9	38	
13	Carlton	22	8	14	0	1746	1972	88.5	32	
14	Hawthorn	22	7	13	2	1629	1912	85.2	32	
15	Adelaide	22	7	15	0	1616	1971	82.0	28	
16	Gold Coast	22	7	15	0	1430	1863	76.8	28	
17	Collingwood	22	6	16	0	1557	1818	85.6	24	
18	North Melbourne	22	4	17	1	1458	2075	70.3	18	

Updated to match(es) played on 21 August 2021. Source: AFL
Rules for classification: 1) points; 2) percentage; 3) number of points for.
(P) Premiers
