= 2020 AFL draft =

Draft for the Australian Football League

General information
- Dates: 9 December - National Draft; 10 December - Rookie Draft
- Location: Marvel Stadium (virtual event)
- Network: Fox Footy
- Sponsored by: National Australia Bank

Overview
- League: AFL
- First selection: Jamarra Ugle-Hagan (Western Bulldogs)

The 2020 AFL draft consisted of the various periods where the 18 clubs in the Australian Football League (AFL) could trade and recruit players following the completion of the 2020 AFL season.

Due to the impact of the COVID-19 pandemic, the National, Pre-season and Rookie drafts were held as a "virtual event" on 9 and 10 December.

== Key dates ==
Table of key dates
Event	Date(s)
Free agency period	30 October - 6 November
Trade period	4-12 November
National draft	9 December
Pre-season draft	10 December
Rookie draft	10 December
Pre-season supplemental selection period	6 January - start of 2021 AFL season

== Previous trades ==
Since 2015, clubs have been able to trade future picks in the next year's national draft during the trade period. As a result, a total of 40 selections for the 2020 draft were traded during the 2019 trade period. Further trades of future picks can be made before or during the 2019 national draft. The selection order for each of these picks is tied to the original club's finishing position in the 2020 season.

Table of previously traded selections
Rd	Orig. Club	New Club	Acquired via	Ref
1	Greater Western Sydney	Adelaide	Pick swap	
1	Melbourne	North Melbourne	Pick swap	
1	Gold Coast (Priority Pick, #11)	Geelong	Pick swap at the 2019 National Draft	
1	West Coast	Geelong	Tim Kelly trade	
1	Port Adelaide	Brisbane Lions	Pick swap	
2	North Melbourne	Hawthorn	Pick swap	
2	Hawthorn	Melbourne	Sam Frost trade	
2	Essendon	North Melbourne	Pick swap at the 2019 National Draft	
2	Fremantle	Port Adelaide	Pick swap at the 2019 National Draft	
2	Melbourne	Fremantle	Ed Langdon trade	
2	Collingwood	Port Adelaide	via Brisbane Lions (Pick swap) on-traded to Port Adelaide (pick swap)	
2	Western Bulldogs	Adelaide	Alex Keath trade	
2	St Kilda	Richmond	via Fremantle (Bradley Hill and Blake Acres trade) on-traded to Collingwood (James Aish trade) on-traded to Richmond (Pick swap at the 2019 National Draft)	
2	Richmond	Collingwood	Pick swap at the 2019 National Draft	
2	Brisbane Lions	Gold Coast	Callum Ah Chee trade	
3	Adelaide	Western Bulldogs	Alex Keath trade	
3	North Melbourne	Collingwood	via Greater Western Sydney (Aiden Bonar trade) on-traded to Collingwood (Pick swap at the 2019 National Draft)	
3	Sydney	Brisbane Lions	Pick swap at the 2019 National Draft	
3	Brisbane Lions	Sydney	Pick swap at the 2019 National Draft	
3	Gold Coast	Essendon	via Adelaide (Hugh Greenwood trade) on-traded to Geelong (Josh Jenkins trade) on-traded to Essendon (Pick swap at the 2019 National Draft)	
3	Essendon	Hawthorn	via Brisbane Lions (Tom Cutler trade) on-traded to Collingwood (pick swap) on-traded to Hawthorn (Pick swap at the 2019 National Draft)	
3	Fremantle	Adelaide	via St Kilda (Bradley Hill and Blake Acres trade) on-traded to Sydney (Zak Jones trade) on-traded to Adelaide (Pick swap at the 2019 National Draft)	
3	Collingwood	Adelaide	via Fremantle (James Aish trade); On-traded to Adelaide (pick swap)	
3	St Kilda	Port Adelaide	Paddy Ryder and Dougal Howard trade	
3	Geelong	West Coast	Tim Kelly trade	
4	Adelaide	Sydney	Pick swap at the 2019 National Draft	
4	Sydney	St Kilda	Zak Jones trade	
4	Gold Coast	Adelaide	Hugh Greenwood trade	
4	Fremantle	Melbourne	Ed Langdon trade	
4	Carlton	Melbourne	via Adelaide (Eddie Betts trade); On-traded to Fremantle (pick swap); On-traded to Melbourne (pick swap)	
4	Greater Western Sydney	Brisbane Lions	via Adelaide (Sam Jacobs trade) on-traded to Port Adelaide (Billy Frampton trade) on-traded to Brisbane Lions (pick swap)	
4	Melbourne	North Melbourne	via Hawthorn (Sam Frost trade) on-traded to Greater Western Sydney (Jonathon Patton trade) on-traded to North Melbourne (Aiden Bonar trade)	
4	Collingwood	Greater Western Sydney	Pick swap at the 2019 National Draft	
4	Western Bulldogs	Hawthorn	Pick swap at the 2019 National Draft	
4	St Kilda	Collingwood	via Fremantle (Bradley Hill and Blake Acres trade) on-traded to Collingwood (James Aish trade)	
4	West Coast	Essendon	Pick swap at the 2019 National Draft	
4	Geelong	Essendon	Pick swap at the 2019 National Draft	
4	Brisbane Lions	Gold Coast	Callum Ah Chee trade	
4	Port Adelaide	St Kilda	Paddy Ryder and Dougal Howard trade	
5	Fremantle	Brisbane Lions	Pick swap at the 2019 National Draft	

== Free agency ==
2020 AFL free agency period signings
Player	Date	Free agent type	Former club	New club	Compensation	Ref
Rory Atkins	30 October	Unrestricted	Adelaide	Gold Coast	End of 2nd round (Pick 40)	
Isaac Smith	30 October	Unrestricted	Hawthorn	Geelong	3rd round (Pick 46)	
Joe Daniher	30 October	Restricted	Essendon	Brisbane Lions	1st round (Pick 7)	
Aidan Corr	30 October	Restricted	Greater Western Sydney	North Melbourne	2nd round (Pick 31)	
Zac Williams	30 October	Restricted	Greater Western Sydney	Carlton	1st round (Pick 10)	
Brad Crouch	4 November	Restricted	Adelaide	St Kilda	2nd round (Pick 23)	
Shaun McKernan	6 November	Unrestricted	Essendon	St Kilda	None	
James Frawley	26 November	Delisted	Hawthorn	St Kilda	None	
Mitch Hinge	26 November	Delisted	Brisbane Lions	Adelaide	None	

== Trades ==
2020 AFL trade period
Date	No.	Player(s)	Traded from	Traded to	Traded for	Ref
4 November	1	Zac Langdon	Greater Western Sydney	West Coast	Pick 54	
4 November	2	Oleg Markov	Richmond	Gold Coast	2021 third-round pick (Gold Coast)	
4 November	3	Jesse Hogan	Fremantle	Greater Western Sydney	Pick 54	
5 November	4	Kyle Hartigan	Adelaide	Hawthorn	2021 fourth-round pick (Hawthorn)	
6 November	5	Pick 43	Brisbane Lions	Melbourne	Pick 53	
6 November	5	2021 fourth-round pick (Brisbane Lions)	Brisbane Lions	Melbourne	2021 third-round pick (Melbourne)	
10 November	6	Peter Wright	Gold Coast	Essendon	2021 fourth-round pick (Essendon)	
10 November	7	Pick 33	Adelaide	Melbourne	2021 second-round pick (Melbourne)	
10 November	7	Pick 50	Adelaide	Melbourne	2021 fourth-round pick (Melbourne)	
10 November	8	Mitch Hannan	Melbourne	Western Bulldogs	2021 third-round pick (Western Bulldogs)	
10 November	9	Braydon Preuss	Melbourne	Greater Western Sydney	Pick 31	
10 November	10	Stefan Martin	Brisbane Lions	Western Bulldogs	N/A	
10 November	10	Pick 70	Brisbane Lions	North Melbourne	Pick 63	
10 November	10	Lachie Young	Western Bulldogs	North Melbourne	N/A	
11 November	11	Lachie Fogarty	Geelong	Carlton	Pick 30	
11 November	11	Pick 38	Geelong	Carlton	Pick 51	
11 November	12	Nakia Cockatoo	Geelong	Brisbane Lions	2021 third-round pick (Melbourne)	
11 November	13	Adam Saad	Essendon	Carlton	Pick 8	
11 November	13	Pick 48	Essendon	Carlton	Pick 8	
11 November	13	Pick 78	Essendon	Carlton	Pick 87	
11 November	14	Aliir Aliir	Sydney	Port Adelaide	2021 second-round pick (Port Adelaide)	
11 November	15	Shaun Higgins	North Melbourne	Geelong	Pick 30	
11 November	16	Tom Hickey	West Coast	Sydney	Pick 58	
11 November	16	Tom Hickey	West Coast	Sydney	Pick 62	
11 November	16	Pick 34	West Coast	Sydney	2021 second-round pick (Port Adelaide)	
11 November	16	Pick 60	West Coast	Sydney	2021 third-round pick (Sydney)	
12 November	17	Pick 25	Sydney	Melbourne	Pick 31	
12 November	17	Pick 25	Sydney	Melbourne	Pick 43	
12 November	18	Ben Brown	North Melbourne	Melbourne	Pick 26	
12 November	18	Pick 28	North Melbourne	Melbourne	Pick 33	
12 November	18	2021 fourth-round pick (North Melbourne)	North Melbourne	Melbourne	2021 fourth-round pick (Brisbane Lions)	
12 November	19	Jack Higgins	Richmond	St Kilda	Pick 17	
12 November	19	Pick 21	Richmond	St Kilda	Pick 17	
12 November	19	2021 fourth-round pick (Richmond)	Richmond	St Kilda	2021 second-round pick (St Kilda)	
12 November	20	Alex Witherden	Brisbane Lions	West Coast	Pick 58	
12 November	20	Pick 86	Brisbane Lions	West Coast	2021 third-round pick (West Coast)	
12 November	21	Jaidyn Stephenson	Collingwood	North Melbourne	Pick 26	
12 November	21	Atu Bosenavulagi	Collingwood	North Melbourne	Pick 33	
12 November	21	Pick 39	Collingwood	North Melbourne	Pick 70	
12 November	22	Pick 18	Brisbane Lions	Melbourne	Pick 25	
12 November	22	Pick 18	Brisbane Lions	Melbourne	Pick 68	
12 November	22	Pick 19	Brisbane Lions	Melbourne	Pick 69	
12 November	22	2021 second-round pick (Brisbane Lions)	Brisbane Lions	Melbourne	2021 first-round pick (Melbourne)	
12 November	23	Orazio Fantasia	Essendon	Port Adelaide	Pick 29	
12 November	23	Pick 73	Essendon	Port Adelaide	2021 third-round pick (Port Adelaide)	
12 November	24	Tom Phillips	Collingwood	Hawthorn	Pick 65	
12 November	25	Adam Treloar	Collingwood	Western Bulldogs	Pick 14	
12 November	25	Pick 26	Collingwood	Western Bulldogs	Pick 14	
12 November	25	Pick 33	Collingwood	Western Bulldogs	2021 second-round pick (Western Bulldogs)	
12 November	25	Pick 42	Collingwood	Western Bulldogs	2021 second-round pick (Western Bulldogs)	
12 November	26	Jye Caldwell	Greater Western Sydney	Essendon	Pick 29	
12 November	26	Pick 44	Greater Western Sydney	Essendon	Pick 29	
12 November	26	Pick 74	Greater Western Sydney	Essendon	2021 second-round pick (Essendon)	
12 November	27	Jeremy Cameron	Greater Western Sydney	Geelong	Pick 13	
12 November	27	Jeremy Cameron	Greater Western Sydney	Geelong	Pick 15	
12 November	27	2021 second-round pick GWS)	Greater Western Sydney	Geelong	Pick 20	
12 November	27	2021 second-round pick (Essendon)	Greater Western Sydney	Geelong	2021 fourth-round pick (Geelong)	
12 November	28	Nick Hind	St Kilda	Essendon	Pick 67	
12 November	28	Pick 77	St Kilda	Essendon	Pick 74	
24 November	29	Pick 31	Sydney	Carlton	Pick 48	
24 November	29	Pick 31	Sydney	Carlton	2021 third-round pick (Carlton)	
24 November	30	Pick 37	Gold Coast	Sydney	2021 third-round pick (Carlton)	
25 November	31	Pick 63	Brisbane Lions	Adelaide	Pick 66	
25 November	31	Pick 63	Brisbane Lions	Adelaide	2021 fourth-round pick (Melbourne)	
26 November	32	Pick 56	Adelaide	Fremantle	2021 fourth-round pick (Fremantle)	
26 November	32	Pick 63	Adelaide	Fremantle	2021 fourth-round pick (Fremantle)	
1 December	33	Pick 29	Greater Western Sydney	Western Bulldogs	Pick 26	
1 December	33	Pick 52	Greater Western Sydney	Western Bulldogs	Pick 26	
2 December	34	Pick 27	Gold Coast	Geelong	2021 third-round pick (Melbourne)	
2 December	35	Pick 66	Brisbane Lions	Collingwood	Pick 70	
2 December	35	Pick 68	Brisbane Lions	Collingwood	2021 fourth-round pick (Collingwood)	
9 December	36	Pick 62	Collingwood	Hawthorn	Pick 41	
9 December	36	Pick 69	Collingwood	Hawthorn	Pick 41	
9 December	36	2021 second-round pick (Collingwood)	Collingwood	Hawthorn	Pick 42	
9 December	37	Pick 38	Adelaide	Port Adelaide	Pick 34	
9 December	37	2021 fourth-round pick (Hawthorn)	Adelaide	Port Adelaide	Pick 34	
9 December	38	Pick 20	Richmond	Geelong	2021 first-round pick (Geelong)	
9 December	39	Pick 24	Greater Western Sydney	Collingwood	2021 first-round pick (Collingwood)	
9 December	39	Pick 30	Greater Western Sydney	Collingwood	2021 first-round pick (Collingwood)	
9 December	39	2021 fourth-round pick (Geelong)	Greater Western Sydney	Collingwood	2021 first-round pick (Collingwood)	
9 December	40	Pick 35	Fremantle	Brisbane Lions	Pick 29	
9 December	40	Pick 46	Fremantle	Brisbane Lions	Pick 29	
9 December	41	Pick 27	Adelaide	Collingwood	Pick 25	
9 December	41	2021 third-round pick (Adelaide)	Adelaide	Collingwood	Pick 25	
9 December	42	Pick 27	Collingwood	Fremantle	Pick 30	
9 December	42	Pick 59	Collingwood	Fremantle	2021 third-round pick (Fremantle)	
9 December	43	Pick 53	Collingwood	Fremantle	Pick 46	
9 December	43	Pick 57	Collingwood	Fremantle	Pick 46	
9 December	44	Pick 54	St Kilda	Hawthorn	Pick 43	
9 December	44	2021 fourth-round pick (Richmond)	St Kilda	Hawthorn	Pick 43	
9 December	45	Pick 49	Brisbane Lions	Essendon	Pick 42	
9 December	45	Pick 50	Brisbane Lions	Essendon	Pick 42	
9 December	46	Pick 49	Collingwood	Port Adelaide	Pick 44	
9 December	46	2021 fourth-round pick (Geelong)	Collingwood	Port Adelaide	Pick 44	
9 December	47	Pick 46	Melbourne	Hawthorn	2021 third-round pick (Hawthorn)	
9 December	47	2021 fourth-round pick (North Melbourne)	Melbourne	Hawthorn	2021 third-round pick (Hawthorn)	

== List changes ==
=== Retirements ===
Table key
R	Rookie listed player
B	Category B Rookie listed player

Table of player retirements
Date	Name	Club	Ref
19 December	Alex Rance	Richmond	
29 July	Nathan Brown	St Kilda	
2 September	Pearce Hanley	Gold Coast	
8 September	Conor McKenna	Essendon	
10 September	Bryce Gibbs	Adelaide	
10 September	Matthew Kreuzer	Carlton	
14 September	Ben Stratton	Hawthorn	
14 September	Paul Puopolo	Hawthorn	
15 September	Kade Simpson	Carlton	
15 September	Tom Bellchambers	Essendon	
17 September	Justin Westhoff	Port Adelaide	
17 September	Tom Sheridan (R)	Greater Western Sydney	
19 September	Sam Jacobs	Greater Western Sydney	
23 September	Conor Glass	Hawthorn	
23 September	Ricky Henderson	Hawthorn	
24 September	Anthony Miles	Gold Coast	
24 September	George Horlin-Smith	Gold Coast	
24 September	Jack Watts	Port Adelaide	
25 September	Will Schofield	West Coast	
25 September	Ben Reid	Collingwood	
27 September	Tory Dickson	Western Bulldogs	
28 September	Harley Bennell	Melbourne	
11 October	Travis Varcoe	Collingwood	
13 October	Lynden Dunn (R)	Collingwood	
17 October	Brad Ebert	Port Adelaide	
21 October	Allen Christensen	Brisbane Lions	
21 October	Dayne Beams	Collingwood	
24 October	Gary Ablett Jr.	Geelong	
31 October	Harry Taylor	Geelong	
19 November	Jack Steven	Geelong	
25 November	Kade Kolodjashnij	Melbourne	
30 November	Tom Langdon	Collingwood	

=== Delistings ===
Table key
R	Rookie listed player
B	Category B Rookie listed player

Table of player delistings
Date	Name	Club	Ref
20 August	Cam McCarthy	Fremantle	
21 August	Jason Carter (B)	Fremantle	
30 August	Dillon O'Reilly (R)	Fremantle	
30 August	Isaiah Butters (B)	Fremantle	
17 September	Joe Atley	Port Adelaide	
17 September	Wylie Buzza	Port Adelaide	
17 September	Tobin Cox (R)	Port Adelaide	
17 September	Riley Grundy (R)	Port Adelaide	
18 September	Paul Ahern	North Melbourne	
18 September	Joel Crocker	North Melbourne	
18 September	Majak Daw	North Melbourne	
18 September	Sam Durdin	North Melbourne	
18 September	Lachlan Hosie (R)	North Melbourne	
18 September	Ben Jacobs	North Melbourne	
18 September	Jamie Macmillan	North Melbourne	
18 September	Tom Murphy (R)	North Melbourne	
18 September	Jasper Pittard	North Melbourne	
18 September	Marley Williams	North Melbourne	
18 September	Mason Wood	North Melbourne	
20 September	Shaun McKernan	Essendon	
20 September	Mitchell Hibberd (R)	Essendon	
20 September	Kobe Mutch	Essendon	
20 September	Josh Begley	Essendon	
20 September	Noah Gown	Essendon	
21 September	Darcy Lang	Carlton	
21 September	Hugh Goddard (R)	Carlton	
21 September	Ben Silvagni	Carlton	
21 September	Finbar O'Dwyer	Carlton	
23 September	Kyle Dunkley (R)	Melbourne	
23 September	Corey Wagner (R)	Melbourne	
23 September	Josh Wagner	Melbourne	
23 September	Riley Knight	Adelaide	
23 September	Ayce Taylor (R)	Adelaide	
23 September	Patrick Wilson (R)	Adelaide	
24 September	Corey Ellis	Gold Coast	
24 September	Josh Schoenfeld (R)	Gold Coast	
24 September	Mitch Riordan (R)	Gold Coast	
24 September	Sam Fletcher (R)	Gold Coast	
24 September	Jesse Joyce	Gold Coast	
24 September	Jacob Dawson(B)	Gold Coast	
24 September	Jacob Heron (B)	Gold Coast	
25 September	Brandon Matera	Fremantle	
25 September	Hugh Dixon (R)	Fremantle	
25 September	Tom North (R)	Fremantle	
25 September	Jarvis Pina (R)	Fremantle	
29 September	Heath Shaw	Greater Western Sydney	
7 October	Darren Minchington (R)	Hawthorn	
7 October	Will Golds (R)	Hawthorn	
7 October	Jackson Ross	Hawthorn	
7 October	James Frawley	Hawthorn	
11 October	Logan Austin	St Kilda	
11 October	Doulton Langlands (R)	St Kilda	
11 October	Ryan Abbott	St Kilda	
11 October	Jack Mayo (R)	St Kilda	
11 October	Jack Bell (R)	St Kilda	
14 October	Tim Broomhead (R)	Collingwood	
14 October	Matthew Scharenberg	Collingwood	
16 October	Ryley Stoddart	Sydney	
16 October	Michael Knoll (R)	Sydney	
16 October	Jack Maibaum (R)	Sydney	
16 October	Harry Reynolds (R)	Sydney	
16 October	Brady Rowles (R)	Sydney	
20 October	Cam Sutcliffe (R)	Port Adelaide	
21 October	Hamish Brayshaw (R)	West Coast	
21 October	Francis Watson	West Coast	
21 October	Nic Reid (R)	West Coast	
21 October	Anthony Treacy (R)	West Coast	
21 October	Mitch O'Neill (R)	West Coast	
23 October	Matt Eagles (B)	Brisbane Lions	
23 October	Corey Lyons (R)	Brisbane Lions	
23 October	Sam Skinner (R)	Brisbane Lions	
23 October	Jacob Allison (R)	Brisbane Lions	
23 October	Toby Wooller	Brisbane Lions	
26 October	James Parsons	Geelong	
26 October	Jacob Kennerley	Geelong	
26 October	Blake Schlensog (B)	Geelong	
28 October	Fraser Turner	Richmond	
28 October	Luke English	Richmond	
6 November	Billy Gowers	Western Bulldogs	
6 November	Fergus Greene	Western Bulldogs	
6 November	Brad Lynch	Western Bulldogs	
7 November	Matthew Parker	St Kilda	
13 November	Jordan Gallucci	Adelaide	
13 November	Myles Poholke	Adelaide	
13 November	Ben Crocker (R)	Adelaide	
14 November	Jake Patmore	Port Adelaide	
17 November	Ed Phillips	St Kilda	
17 November	Matt Suckling	Western Bulldogs	
17 November	Jackson Trengove	Western Bulldogs	
17 November	Callum Porter	Western Bulldogs	
17 November	Oscar McDonald	Melbourne	
17 November	Aaron Nietschke	Melbourne	
18 November	Harrison Macreadie	Carlton	
18 November	Callum Moore (R)	Carlton	
18 November	Fraser Phillips (R)	Carlton	
18 November	Cameron Polson	Carlton	
19 November	Jacob Townsend (R)	Essendon	
19 November	Henry Crauford (R)	Essendon	
19 November	Lewis Jetta	West Coast	
21 November	Jonathon Marsh (R)	St Kilda	
22 November	Shane Savage	St Kilda	
24 November	Zac Foot	Sydney	
24 November	Jackson Thurlow	Sydney	
24 November	Jake Tarca	Geelong	
25 November	Ed Vickers-Willis	North Melbourne	
25 November	Harry Jones (R)	Hawthorn	
25 November	Mathew Walker	Hawthorn	
25 November	Rupert Wills	Collingwood	
25 November	Flynn Appleby (R)	Collingwood	
25 November	Mitch Hinge	Brisbane Lions	
25 November	Cedric Cox	Brisbane Lions	
25 November	Grant Birchall	Brisbane Lions	
25 November	Jackson Hately	Greater Western Sydney	
25 November	Sam Reid (R)	Greater Western Sydney	
25 November	Zach Sproule (R)	Greater Western Sydney	
25 November	Derek Eggmolesse-Smith (B)	Richmond	
25 November	Bailey Banfield	Fremantle	
25 November	Jack Hombsch	Gold Coast	
25 November	Jordan Murdoch	Gold Coast	
30 November	Elijah Taylor	Sydney	
30 November	Daniel Venables	West Coast	

=== Moved to Rookie List ===
As part of the revised AFL Collective Bargaining agreement, clubs could now move up to two players from their Senior List on to their Rookie List without having to redraft them through the rookie draft.

Table of players moved from the senior list to the rookie list
Name	Club	Ref
David McKay	Adelaide	
Ben Davis	Adelaide	
Connor Ballenden	Brisbane Lions	
Rhys Mathieson	Brisbane Lions	
Eddie Betts	Carlton	
Matthew Kennedy	Carlton	
Brett Bewley	Fremantle	
Lachie Schultz	Fremantle	
Jarrod Harbrow	Gold Coast	
Zac Smith	Gold Coast	
Daniel Lloyd	Greater Western Sydney	
Matthew Buntine	Greater Western Sydney	
Dylan Moore	Hawthorn	
James Jordon	Melbourne	
Aaron Nietschke	Melbourne	
Will Walker	North Melbourne	
Ben Miller	Richmond	
Oscar Clavarino	St Kilda	
Darragh Joyce	St Kilda	
Sam Gray	Sydney	
Robbie Fox	Sydney	
Mark Hutchings	West Coast	
Ben Cavarra	Western Bulldogs	
Will Hayes	Western Bulldogs	

== Pre-draft selections ==
As part of their 2019 draft concessions, Gold Coast were able to prelist players from their Academy zone.

Table of pre-draft selections
Player	Club	Recruited from		Notes	Ref.
Player	Club	Club	League	Notes	Ref.
Alex Davies	Gold Coast	Broadbeach	QAFL		
Joel Jeffrey	Gold Coast	Darwin Buffaloes	NTFL		

== 2020 national draft ==
^	Denotes player who has been inducted to the Australian Football Hall of Fame
*	Denotes player who has been a premiership player and been selected for at least one All-Australian team
^{+}	Denotes player who has been a premiership player at least once
^{x}	Denotes player who has been selected for at least one All-Australian team
^{#}	Denotes player who has never played in a VFL/AFL home and away season or finals game
^{~}	Denotes player who has been selected as Rising Star

Table of national draft selections
Round	Pick	Player	Club	Recruited from		Notes
Round	Pick	Player	Club	Club	League	Notes
1	1	Jamarra Ugle-Hagan	Western Bulldogs	Oakleigh Chargers	NAB League	Next Generation Academy selection (Indigenous), matched bid by Adelaide
1	2	Riley Thilthorpe	Adelaide	West Adelaide	SANFL	
1	3	Will Phillips	North Melbourne	Oakleigh Chargers	NAB League	
1	4	Logan McDonald	Sydney	Perth	WAFL	
1	5	Braeden Campbell	Sydney	Pennant Hills	Sydney AFL	Academy selection, matched bid by Hawthorn
1	6	Denver Grainger-Barras	Hawthorn	Swan Districts	WAFL	
1	7	Elijah Hollands	Gold Coast	Murray Bushrangers	NAB League	
1	8	Nik Cox	Essendon	Northern Knights	NAB League	
1	9	Archie Perkins	Essendon	Sandringham Dragons	NAB League	Free Agency compensation pick (Daniher)
1	10	Zach Reid	Essendon	Gippsland Power	NAB League	Traded from Carlton
1	11	Luke Pedlar	Adelaide	Glenelg	SANFL	Traded from Greater Western Sydney in 2019
1	12	Tanner Bruhn	Greater Western Sydney	Geelong Falcons	NAB League	Free Agency compensation pick (Williams)
1	13	Tom Powell	North Melbourne	Sturt	SANFL	Traded from Melbourne in 2019
1	14	Heath Chapman	Fremantle ^{[a]}	West Perth	WAFL	
Priority	15	Conor Stone	Greater Western Sydney	Oakleigh Chargers	NAB League	Traded from Geelong; received from Gold Coast at the 2019 National Draft
1	16	Lachie Jones	Port Adelaide	Woodville-West Torrens	SANFL	Next Generation Academy selection (Indigenous), matched bid by Collingwood
1	17	Oliver Henry	Collingwood	Geelong Falcons	NAB League	Traded from Western Bulldogs
1	18	Ryan Angwin	Greater Western Sydney	Gippsland Power	NAB League	Traded from Geelong; received from West Coast in 2019
1	19	Finlay Macrae	Collingwood	Oakleigh Chargers	NAB League	
1	20	Max Holmes	Geelong	Sandringham Dragons	NAB League	Traded from Richmond at the draft; received from St Kilda
1	21	Jake Bowey^{+}	Melbourne	Sandringham Dragons	NAB League	Traded from Brisbane Lions
1	22	Bailey Laurie	Melbourne	Oakleigh Chargers	NAB League	Traded from Brisbane Lions; received from Port Adelaide in 2019
1	23	Reef McInnes	Collingwood	Oakleigh Chargers	NAB League	Next Generation Academy selection (Filipino descent), matched bid by Greater Western Sydney
1	24	Blake Coleman	Brisbane Lions	Morningside	QAFL	Academy selection, matched bid by Collingwood
1	25	Brayden Cook	Adelaide	South Adelaide	SANFL	Traded from Collingwood at the draft; received from Greater Western Sydney at the draft; received from Geelong
1	26	Matthew McLeod-Allison	St Kilda	Calder Cannons	NAB League	Traded from Richmond
2	27	Nathan O'Driscoll	Fremantle	Perth	WAFL	Traded from Collingwood at the draft; received from Adelaide at the draft
2	28	Sam Berry	Adelaide	Gippsland Power	NAB League	Free Agency compensation pick (Crouch)
2	29	Seamus Mitchell	Hawthorn	Bendigo Pioneers	NAB League	Traded from North Melbourne in 2019
2	30	Caleb Poulter	Collingwood	Woodville-West Torrens	SANFL	Traded from Melbourne; received from Sydney
2	31	Liam McMahon	Collingwood	Northern Knights	NAB League	Traded from Western Bulldogs, received from Collingwood; received from North Melbourne; received from Melbourne; received from Hawthorn in 2019
2	32	Errol Gulden	Sydney	UNSW-Eastern Suburbs Bulldogs	Sydney AFL	Academy selection, matched bid by Geelong
2	33	Shannon Neale	Geelong	South Fremantle	WAFL	Traded from Gold Coast
2	34	Fraser Rosman	Melbourne	Sandringham Dragons	NAB League	Traded from North Melbourne; received from Essendon in 2019
2	35	Connor Downie	Hawthorn	Eastern Ranges	NAB League	Next Generation Academy selection (Chinese descent), matched bid by North Melbourne
2	36	Charlie Lazzaro	North Melbourne	Geelong Falcons	NAB League	Traded from Geelong; received from Carlton
2	37	Corey Durdin	Carlton	Central District	SANFL	Traded from Sydney; received from Melbourne; received from Greater Western Sydney; Free Agency compensation pick (Corr)
2	38	James Rowe	Adelaide	Woodville-West Torrens	SANFL	Traded from Fremantle; received from Melbourne in 2019
2	39	Josh Eyre	Essendon	Calder Cannons	NAB League	Next Generation Academy selection (Indigenous), matched bid by Richmond
2	40	Samson Ryan	Richmond	Western Magpies	QAFL	Traded from St Kilda (via Collingwood and Fremantle) in 2019. Academy eligible for Brisbane, who did not match the bid
2	41	Jack Carroll	Carlton	East Fremantle	WAFL	Traded from Geelong
2	42	Phoenix Spicer	North Melbourne	South Adelaide	SANFL	Traded from Collingwood; received from Richmond in 2019
3	43	Harry Sharp	Brisbane Lions	GWV Rebels	NAB League	Traded from Adelaide in 2019
3	44	Beau McCreery	Collingwood	South Adelaide	SANFL	Traded from Port Adelaide^{[c]} at the draft
3	45	Tom Highmore	St Kilda	South Adelaide	SANFL	
3	46	Tyler Brockman	Hawthorn	Subiaco	WAFL	Traded from Essendon (via Collingwood and Brisbane Lions) in 2019
3	47	Nick Stevens	Geelong	GWV Rebels	NAB League	Traded from Carlton
3	48	Henry Smith	Brisbane Lions	Woodville-West Torrens	SANFL	Traded from Melbourne
3	49	Ollie Lord	Port Adelaide	Sandringham Dragons	NAB League	
3	50	Brandon Walker	Fremantle	East Fremantle	WAFL	Next Generation Academy selection (born in Ghana), matched bid by Essendon
3	51	Maurice Rioli Jr.	Richmond	Oakleigh Chargers	NAB League	Father–son selection (son of Maurice Rioli), matched bid by Essendon
4	52	Luke Edwards	West Coast	Glenelg	SANFL	Traded from Sydney; received from Adelaide in 2019
4	53	Cody Brand	Essendon	Calder Cannons	NAB League	Next Generation Academy selection (Indigenous), matched bid by Western Bulldogs
4	54	Joel Western	Fremantle	Claremont	WAFL	Next Generation Academy selection (Singaporean descent), matched bid by Western Bulldogs
4	55	Dominic Bedendo	Western Bulldogs	Murray Bushrangers	NAB League	
4	56	Eddie Ford	North Melbourne	Western Jets	NAB League	
4	57	Isiah Winder	West Coast	Peel Thunder	WAFL	
4	58	Cameron Fleeton	Greater Western Sydney	Geelong Falcons	NAB League	
4	59	Jacob Wehr	Greater Western Sydney	Woodville-West Torrens	SANFL	

- ^{a} Fremantle are carrying over a 264.9 point deficit from 2019 (Liam Henry, Next Generation Academy selection #9), moving their default first-round pick
- ^{b} Greater Western Sydney are carrying over a 254.2 point deficit from 2019 (Tom Green, Academy selection #10), moving their default second-round pick
- ^{c} Port Adelaide are carrying over a 115.9 point deficit from 2019 (Jackson Mead, Father–son rule selection #25), moving their default second-round pick

=== Rookie elevations ===
Clubs were able to promote any player who was listed on their rookie list in 2020 to their 2021 primary playing list prior to the draft.

Table of rookie elevations
Player	Club
Tom Fullarton	Brisbane Lions
Michael Gibbons	Carlton
Jack Madgen	Collingwood
Brody Mihocek	Collingwood
Connor Budarick	Gold Coast
Nick Holman	Gold Coast
Malcolm Rosas	Gold Coast
Jack Buckley	Greater Western Sydney
Changkuoth Jiath	Hawthorn
Jay Lockhart	Melbourne
Liam Baker	Richmond
Mabior Chol	Richmond
Joel Amartey	Sydney
Harry Edwards	West Coast

== 2021 pre-season draft ==
The 2021 pre-season draft was held on the afternoon of Thursday, 10 December 2020 prior to the commencement of the rookie draft.

Table of pre-season draft selections
Round	Pick	Player	Club	Recruited from		Notes
Round	Pick	Player	Club	Club	League	Notes
1	1	Jackson Hately	Adelaide	Greater Western Sydney	AFL	

== 2021 rookie draft ==
Table of rookie draft selections
Round	Pick	Player	Club	Recruited from		Notes
Round	Pick	Player	Club	Club	League	Notes
1	1	Bryce Gibbs	Adelaide	Adelaide	AFL	Gibbs retired on 10 September 2020. However, Gibbs was retained as an inactive player on Adelaide's Rookie List due to a contractual settlement
1	2	Patrick Walker	North Melbourne	North Hobart	TSL	
1	3	Malachy Carruthers	Sydney	Sturt	SANFL	
1	4	Jack Saunders	Hawthorn	Norwood	SANFL	
1	5	Jacob Townsend	Gold Coast	Essendon	AFL	
1	6	Martin Gleeson	Essendon	Essendon	AFL	
1	7	Josh Treacy	Fremantle	Bendigo Pioneers	NAB League	
1	8	Luke Parks	Carlton	Glenelg	SANFL	
1	9	Sam Reid	Greater Western Sydney	Greater Western Sydney	AFL	
1	10	Passed	Melbourne	—	—	
1	11	Lachlan McNeil	Western Bulldogs	Woodville-West Torrens	SANFL	
1	12	Zane Trew	West Coast	Swan Districts	WAFL	
1	13	Jack Ginnivan^{+}	Collingwood	Bendigo Pioneers	NAB League	
1	14	Passed	St Kilda	—	—	
1	15	Grant Birchall	Brisbane Lions	Brisbane Lions	AFL	
1	16	Tyson Goldsack	Port Adelaide	Port Adelaide	SANFL	
1	17	Passed	Richmond	—	—	
2	18	Connor Menadue	North Melbourne	Werribee	VFL	
2	19	Passed	Sydney	—	—	
2	20	Jack Hombsch	Gold Coast	Gold Coast	AFL	
2	21	Dylan Clarke	Essendon	Essendon	AFL	
2	22	Bailey Banfield	Fremantle	Fremantle	AFL	
2	23	Passed	Carlton	—	—	
2	24	Zach Sproule	Greater Western Sydney	Greater Western Sydney	AFL	
2	25	Passed	Melbourne	—	—	
2	26	Roarke Smith	Western Bulldogs	Western Bulldogs	AFL	
2	27	Daniel Venables	West Coast	West Coast	AFL	
2	28	Isaac Chugg	Collingwood	Launceston	TSL	
2	29	Passed	St Kilda	—	—	
2	30	Passed	Port Adelaide	—	—	
2	31	Passed	Richmond	—	—	
3	32	Passed	North Melbourne	—	—	
3	33	Jordan Murdoch	Gold Coast	Gold Coast	AFL	
3	34	Passed	Essendon	—	—	
3	35	Passed	Collingwood	—	—	
3	36	Passed	St Kilda	—	—	
3	37	Taj Schofield	Port Adelaide	Woodville-West Torrens	SANFL	Father–son selection (son of Jarrad Schofield)
3	38	Aiden Fyfe	Gold Coast	Broadbeach	QAFL	Academy selection
3	39	Passed	Collingwood	—	—	
4	40	Rhys Nicholls	Gold Coast	Labrador	QAFL	Academy selection

=== Category B rookie selections ===
Table of Category B rookie signings
Name	Club	Origin	Note	Ref
Tariek Newchurch	Adelaide	North Adelaide (SANFL)	Next Generation Academy selection (Indigenous)	
James Borlase	Adelaide	Sturt (SANFL)	Next Generation Academy selection (born in Egypt)	
Deividas Uosis	Brisbane Lions	Kerry GAA	International selection (Ireland)	
Carter Michael	Brisbane Lions	Maroochydore (QAFL)	Academy selection	
Paul Tsapatolis	Geelong	Keilor Thunder (Big V)	3-year non-registered player (basketball)	
Hewago Oea	Gold Coast	Gold Coast (NEAFL)	International selection (Papua New Guinea)	
Will Shaw	Greater Western Sydney	Bendigo Pioneers (NAB League)	Academy selection	
Mate Colina	Richmond	Hawaii Rainbow Warriors (NCAA)	3-year non-registered player (basketball)	
Marc Sheather	Sydney	Pennant Hills (Sydney AFL)	Academy selection	

=== Pre-season supplemental selection period ===
Table of Pre-season supplemental selection period signings
Player	Club	Recruited from		Notes	Ref
Player	Club	Club	League	Notes	Ref
Nick Murray	Adelaide	Williamstown	VFL		
Oscar McDonald	Carlton	Melbourne	AFL		
Alec Waterman	Essendon	Claremont	WAFL	Previously listed with West Coast	
Kaine Baldwin	Essendon	Glenelg	SANFL		
Lachlan Bramble	Hawthorn	Williamstown	VFL		
Majak Daw	Melbourne	North Melbourne	AFL		
Deakyn Smith	Melbourne	Dandenong Stingrays	NAB League		
Rhyan Mansell	Richmond	Woodville-West Torrens	SANFL		
Derek Eggmolesse-Smith	Richmond	Richmond	AFL	Re-signed player	
Mason Wood	St Kilda	North Melbourne	AFL		
Paul Hunter	St Kilda	South Adelaide	SANFL	Previously listed with Adelaide	
Anthony Scott	Western Bulldogs	Footscray	VFL		

== See also ==
- 2020 AFL Women's draft
