= Lachlan McNeil =

Lachlan McNeil may refer to:

- Lachlan McNeil (Australian rules footballer)
- Lachlan McNeil (wrestler)
