= Tanner Bruhn =

Australian rules footballer (born 2002)

Personal information
- Born: 27 May 2002 (age 24)
- Original team: Geelong Falcons (NAB League)/Geelong Grammar (APS)/Newtown & Chilwell
- Draft: No. 12, 2020 national draft, Greater Western Sydney
- Debut: 21 March 2021, Greater Western Sydney vs. St Kilda, at Sydney Showground Stadium
- Height: 183 cm (6 ft 0 in)
- Weight: 77 kg (170 lb)
- Position: Midfielder

Club information
- Current club: Geelong
- Number: 4

Playing career^{1}
Years	Club	Games (Goals)
2021–2022	Greater Western Sydney	30 (11)
2023–	Geelong	59 (14)
Total		89 (25)
- ^{1} Playing statistics correct to the end of 2026.

Tanner Bruhn (born 27 May 2002) is an Australian rules footballer who plays for the Geelong Football Club in the Australian Football League (AFL). He was recruited by Greater Western Sydney with the 12th draft pick in the 2020 AFL draft.

== Early football ==
Bruhn began his footballing career with the Newtown & Chilwell Football Club in the western suburbs of Geelong. He attended St Joseph’s College alongside future AFL players Ollie Henry and Charlie Lazzaro, before moving to Geelong Grammar on a scholarship in year 10. Bruhn played 55 matches with Newtown & Chilwell Football Club between 2013 and 2018. He played in the Firsts team at his school, Geelong Grammar School, where he won the best and fairest award in 2018 as a 16 year old. He played for Vic Country in the Under 16 Championships and won its MVP award and All-Australian title. His 2019 season saw him impacted by injury after hurting his knee, however he was fit enough to play a few matches with the Geelong Falcons in the NAB League, and Vic Country in the 2019 AFL Under 18 Championships.

== AFL career ==
There was immediate controversy surrounding Bruhn's new career at the Giants after he was shown to have a 'solemn' reaction to being drafted by them on draft night. However, it was later explained by him that it was due to him having a rather 'reserved' personality, and being shocked.

Bruhn debuted for Greater Western Sydney in the opening round of the 2021 AFL season. On debut, Bruhn collected 9 disposals, 2 tackles and 2 clearances. After only collecting 7 disposals the next week against Fremantle, Bruhn was omitted from the team. Bruhn received a nomination for the Goal of the Year award after kicking a skilful goal in the eighth round of the season.

After the 2022 AFL season, Bruhn requested a trade to the newly-crowned premiers, Geelong. Bruhn was traded for Geelong's first round draft pick on 7 October.

Bruhn made his debut for the Cats in their Round 1 game against Collingwood.

Ahead of a practice match in February 2025, Bruhn suffered a finger injury. He did not play any matches in the 2025 AFL season.

== Personal life ==
In October 2024, Bruhn was interviewed by Victoria Police over knowledge his of an alleged sexual assault that has occurred in 2023, but was released without arrest pending further investigation. The AFL policy for standing down players under investigation was on a case by case basis, and was described as being concerned with "the weightiness of the charge, not the weight of evidence". The AFL banned Bruhn from playing at any level in 2025, although he continued to be paid by his football team. The AFL Players Union was highly critical of the AFL's actions and Victoria police, because even though a suppression order was in place, the investigation was widely known and caused enormous stress to Bruhn. On the 11 November 2025, the Crown Prosecutor withdrew the charges as two witnesses were found to have lied under oath. The Victoria Police also agreed to pay his and a friend's legal costs, Changes were also made to prosecution procedures to allow cross examination early in the process, to help prevent this situation occurring again.

== Statistics ==
Updated to the end of round 22, 2026.

Legend
G	Goals	K	Kicks	D	Disposals	T	Tackles
B	Behinds	H	Handballs	M	Marks

Season	Team	No.	Games	Totals							Averages (per game)							Votes
Season	Team	No.	Games	G	B	K	H	D	M	T	G	B	K	H	D	M	T	Votes
2021	Greater Western Sydney	5	13	4	4	56	45	101	16	33	0.3	0.3	4.3	3.5	7.8	1.2	2.5	0
2022	Greater Western Sydney	5	17	7	3	93	109	202	38	59	0.4	0.2	5.5	6.4	11.9	2.2	3.5	1
2023	Geelong	4	19	8	1	176	134	310	56	92	0.4	0.1	9.3	7.1	16.3	2.9	4.8	0
2024	Geelong	4	17	5	4	167	130	297	39	72	0.3	0.2	9.8	7.6	17.5	2.3	4.2	7
2025	Geelong	4	0	—	—	—	—	—	—	—	—	—	—	—	—	—	—	0
2026	Geelong	4	19	1	6	239	166	405	83	61	0.1	0.3	12.6	8.7	21.3	4.4	3.2	3
Career			85	25	18	731	584	1315	232	317	0.3	0.2	8.6	6.9	15.5	2.7	3.7	11
