= Ollie Henry =

Australian rules footballer (born 2002)

Oliver Henry
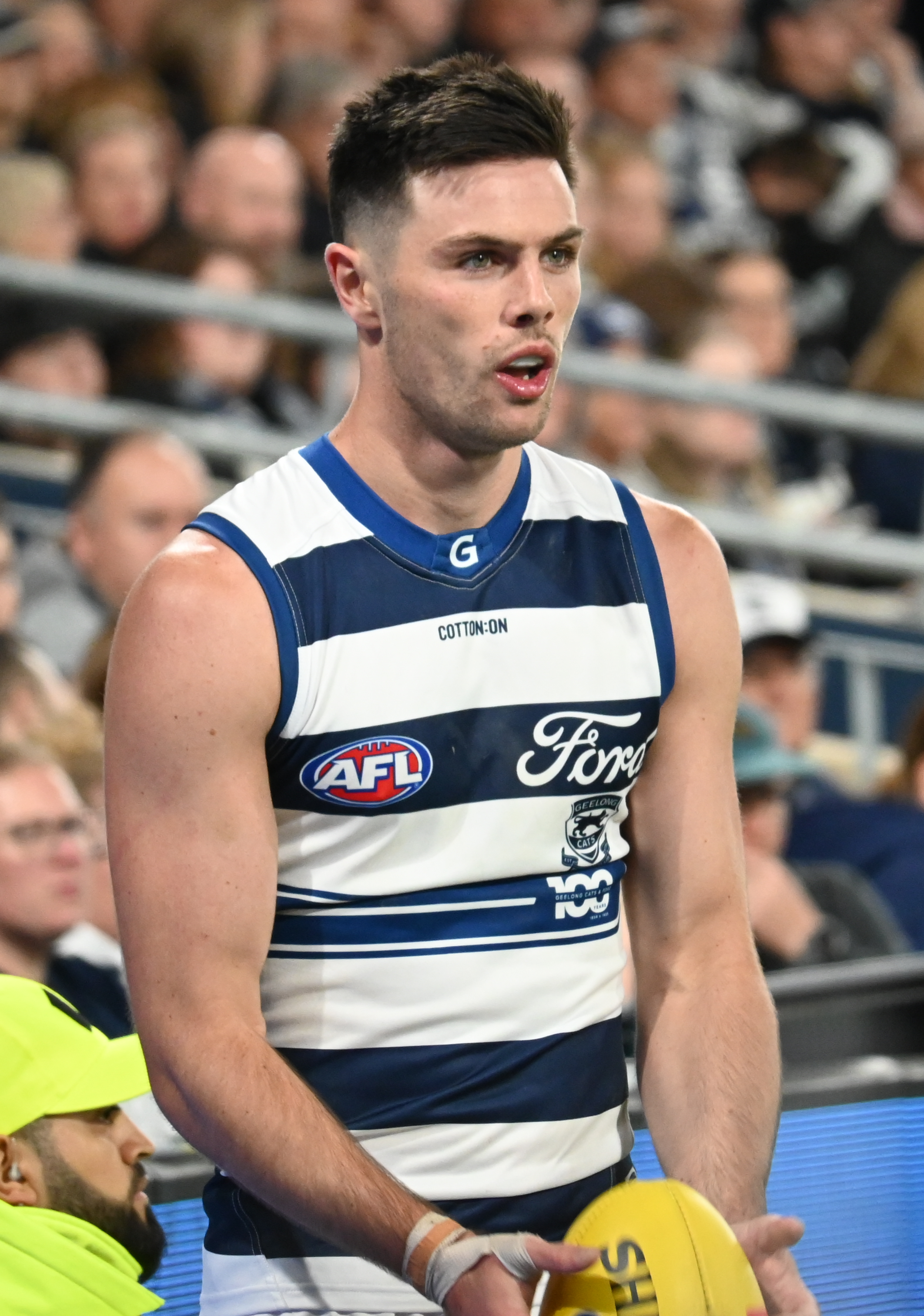
- Henry in 2025

Personal information
- Born: 29 July 2002 (age 24)
- Original team: Geelong Falcons (NAB League)/St Mary's Sporting Club
- Draft: No. 17, 2020 AFL draft, Collingwood
- Debut: 19 March 2021, Collingwood vs. Western Bulldogs, at Melbourne Cricket Ground
- Height: 189 cm (6 ft 2 in)
- Weight: 80 kg (176 lb)
- Position: Key forward

Club information
- Current club: Geelong
- Number: 36

Playing career^{1}
Years	Club	Games (Goals)
2021–2022	Collingwood	25 (28)
2023–	Geelong	84 (140)
Total		109 (168)
- ^{1} Playing statistics correct to the end of the 2026 season.

Career highlights
- Geelong best young player: 2023

Oliver Henry (born 29 July 2002) is an Australian rules footballer who plays for the Geelong Football Club in the Australian Football League (AFL), having initially been recruited by Collingwood with the 17th draft pick in the 2020 AFL draft.

== Early football ==
Henry played for the St Mary's Sporting Club growing up. In his 2016 season with the club in the Under 14 division, he played 14 games and kicked 15 goals. He attended school at St Joseph's College, Geelong. While at St Joseph’s, he formed close friendships with future AFL players Charlie Lazzaro and Tanner Bruhn. He played for the Geelong Falcons in the NAB League, where he participated in 15 matches, kicking 18 goals. His best games saw him kick 5 goals in a single match against the Dandenong Stingrays, and four against the Sydney Swans Academy team. He was selected in the Vic Country representative squad, but did not play a game.

== AFL career ==
=== 2021–2022: Collingwood ===
Henry debuted in the opening round of the 2021 AFL season, in Collingwood's 16 point loss to the Western Bulldogs. On debut, Henry had four disposals and took one mark.

At the end of the 2022 AFL season, Henry requested a trade to Geelong to join his brother Jack, and was traded on the final day of trade period.

=== 2023–: Geelong ===
Henry had a successful first year at Geelong, having played almost every single game for the season, and finished the year with 41 goals.

== Statistics ==
Updated to the end of round 22, 2026.

Legend
G	Goals	K	Kicks	D	Disposals	T	Tackles
B	Behinds	H	Handballs	M	Marks

Season	Team	No.	Games	Totals							Averages (per game)							Votes
Season	Team	No.	Games	G	B	K	H	D	M	T	G	B	K	H	D	M	T	Votes
2021	Collingwood	35	10	7	8	61	30	91	44	9	0.7	0.8	6.1	3.0	9.1	4.4	0.9	0
2022	Collingwood	16	15	21	15	88	33	121	44	13	1.4	1.0	5.9	2.2	8.1	2.9	0.9	1
2023	Geelong	36	22	41	20	139	86	225	82	35	1.9	0.9	6.3	3.9	10.2	3.7	1.6	2
2024	Geelong	36	23	37	18	132	72	204	70	31	1.6	0.8	5.7	3.1	8.9	3.0	1.3	2
2025	Geelong	36	15	14	6	80	37	117	36	27	0.9	0.4	5.3	2.5	7.8	2.4	1.8	0
2026	Geelong	36	20	39	18	145	79	224	68	37	2.0	0.9	7.3	4.0	11.2	3.4	1.9	2
Career			105	159	85	645	337	982	344	152	1.5	0.8	6.1	3.2	9.4	3.3	1.4	7
