= Noah Cumberland =

Australian rules footballer

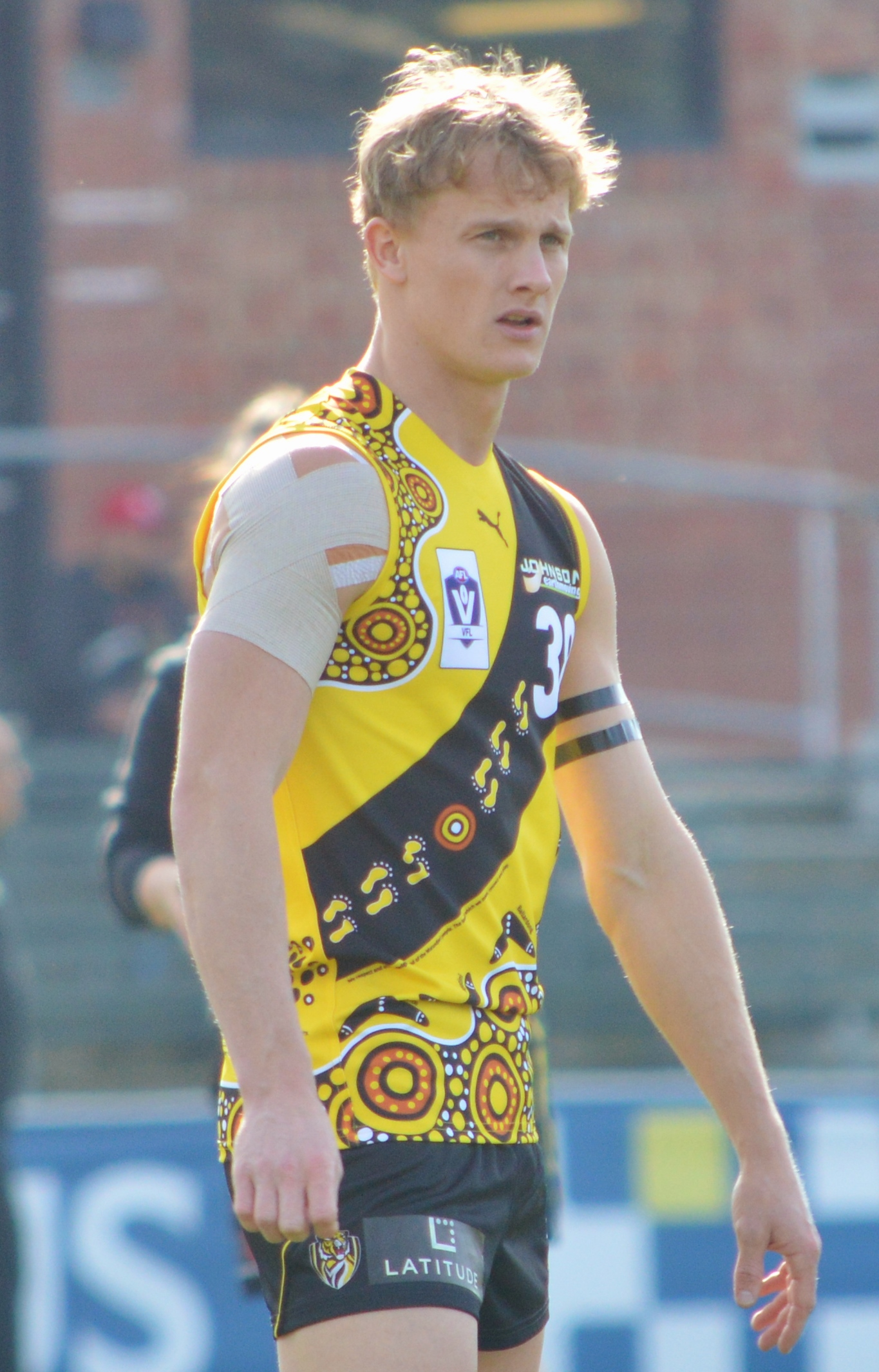
- Cumberland with Richmond's VFL team in July 2021

Personal information
- Nickname: Cumbo
- Born: 15 March 2001 (age 25)
- Original teams: Brisbane (NEAFL); Maroochydore (QAFL)
- Draft: No. 43, 2019 AFL National Draft: Richmond
- Debut: Round 11, 2022, Richmond vs. Sydney, at SCG
- Height: 183 cm (6 ft 0 in)
- Weight: 80 kg (176 lb)
- Position: Half Forward

Playing career
Years	Club	Games (Goals)
2020–2024	Richmond	25 (33)

Career highlights
- NEAFL premiership player: 2019; Rising Star Nominee: Round 20, 2022

Noah Cumberland (born 15 March 2001) is a former professional Australian rules footballer who played for the Richmond Football Club in the Australian Football League (AFL).

== Early life ==
Cumberland was raised on the Sunshine Coast, Queensland, where he attended Mountain Creek State High School and played junior football for Maroochydore. He was also a member of the Brisbane Lions Academy and played part in their victorious 2019 NEAFL Grand Final team where he kicked two goals. The Lions would eventually choose to pass on their opportunity to draft Cumberland when Richmond placed a bid on him.

== AFL career ==
Cumberland was drafted by Richmond with the 43rd overall pick in the 2019 AFL draft. He was delisted at the end of the 2021 season without having played a match at AFL level, but was re-drafted as a rookie by Richmond before the 2022 season. He made his AFL debut as the unactivated medical substitute in round 11 of the 2022 season, before playing his first AFL game in round 16's loss to Gold Coast. A five goal effort in round 20 of the 2022 season saw him with a rising star nomination.

He was delisted by Richmond at the end of the 2024 season.

== AFL statistics ==
Legend
G	Goals	K	Kicks	D	Disposals	T	Tackles
B	Behinds	H	Handballs	M	Marks

Season	Team	No.	Games	Totals							Averages (per game)							Votes
Season	Team	No.	Games	G	B	K	H	D	M	T	G	B	K	H	D	M	T	Votes
2020 (Note: The 2020 season was played with 17 home-and-away matches per team (down from 22) and 16-minute quarters with time on (down from 20-minute quarters with time on) due to the impact of the COVID-19 pandemic.)	Richmond	38	0	—	—	—	—	—	—	—	—	—	—	—	—	—	—	0
2021	Richmond	38	0	—	—	—	—	—	—	—	—	—	—	—	—	—	—	0
2022	Richmond	38	9	19	13	58	27	85	18	17	2.1	1.4	6.4	3.0	9.4	2.0	1.9	0
2023	Richmond	38	9	8	8	49	23	72	23	23	0.9	0.9	5.4	2.6	8.0	2.6	2.6	0
2024	Richmond	38	7	6	2	26	21	47	12	13	0.9	0.3	3.7	3.0	6.7	1.7	1.9	0
Career			25	33	23	133	71	204	53	53	1.3	0.9	5.3	2.8	8.2	2.1	2.1	0

== Senior State/Community League Statistics ==
Year	Team	League	Games	Goals	Best Player
2018	Maroochydore	QFA	8	4	1
2019	Maroochydore	QFA	4	4	1
2019	Brisbane Lions Academy	NAB League	5	5	2
2019	Brisbane Lions Reserves	NEAFL	5	5	0
2019	U18 Allies	U18 Nationals	4	3	2
2021	Richmond Reserves	VFL	8	12	1
2022	Richmond Reserves	VFL	11	23	2
2023	Richmond Reserves	VFL	7	19	4
2024	Richmond Reserves	VFL	10	8	1
2025	South Morang	NFNL	10	19	4
2026	South Morang	NFNL	3	9	2
2026	Maroochydore	QAFL	1	3	0

As of 30 May 2026
