= Henry Smith (footballer, born 2002) =

Australian rules footballer (born 2002)

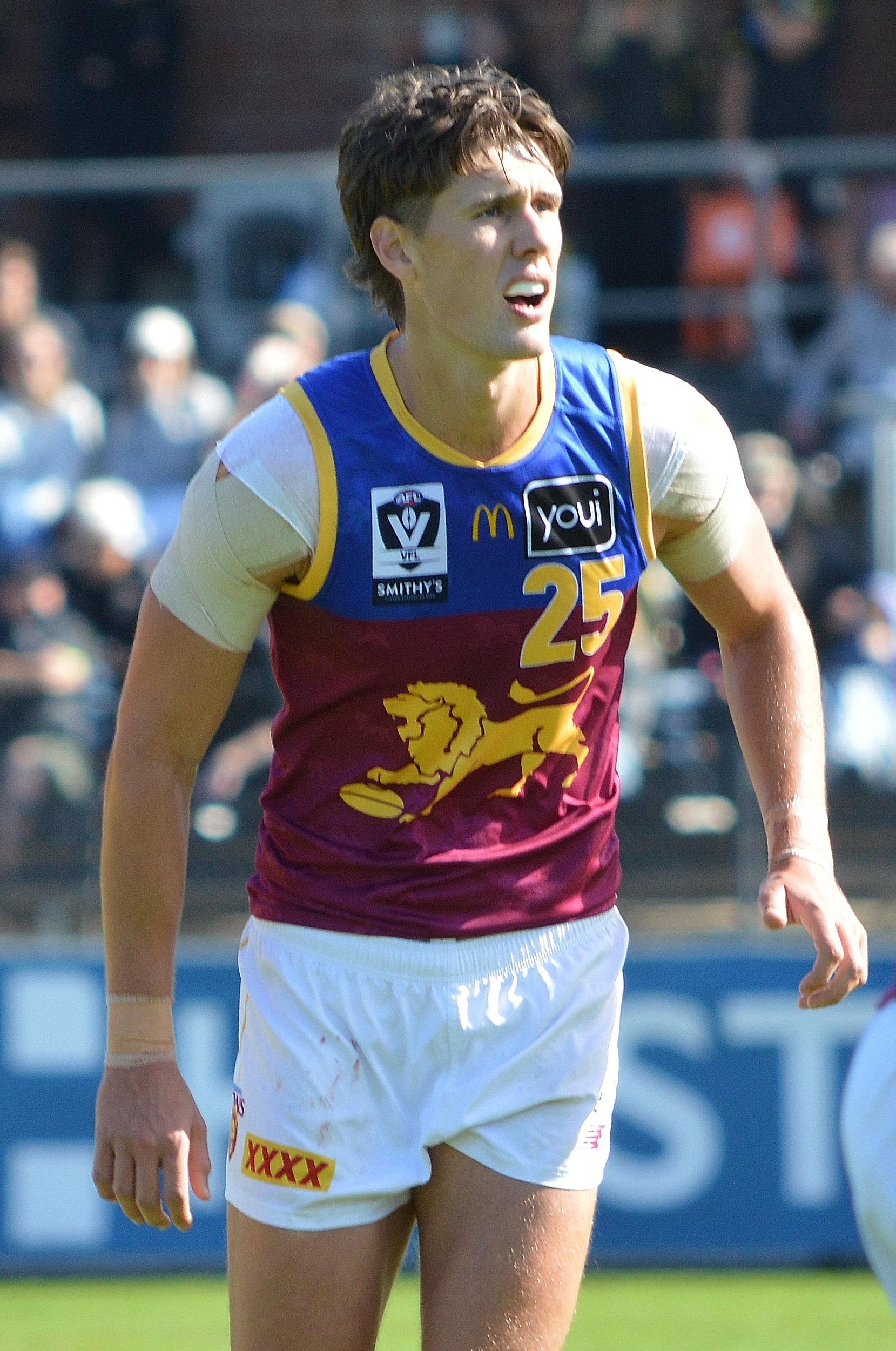
- Smith in April 2025

Personal information
- Born: 24 September 2002 (age 24)
- Original teams: Woodville-West Torrens Football Club (SANFL) Blackwood Football Club (HFL)
- Draft: No. 48, 2020 AFL draft
- Debut: Round 20, 2024, Brisbane Lions vs. Sydney, at The Gabba
- Height: 202 cm (6 ft 8 in)
- Position: Ruck / Forward

Club information
- Current club: Brisbane Lions
- Number: 25

Playing career^{1}
Years	Club	Games (Goals)
2021–	Brisbane Lions	6 (4)
- ^{1} Playing statistics correct to the end of the 2025 season.

Henry Smith (born 24 September 2002) is an Australian rules footballer who currently plays for the Brisbane Lions in the Australian Football League (AFL). Smith was drafted by Brisbane with pick 48 in the 2020 AFL draft and made his AFL debut in round 20 of the 2024 season.

== Statistics ==
Updated to the end of the 2025 season.

Legend
G	Goals	K	Kicks	D	Disposals	T	Tackles
B	Behinds	H	Handballs	M	Marks

Season	Team	No.	Games	Totals							Averages (per game)							Votes
Season	Team	No.	Games	G	B	K	H	D	M	T	G	B	K	H	D	M	T	Votes
2024	Brisbane Lions	25	4	0	0	13	18	31	6	9	0.0	0.0	3.3	4.5	7.8	1.5	2.3	0
2025	Brisbane Lions	25	2	4	0	5	2	7	5	5	2.0	0.0	2.5	1.0	3.5	2.5	2.5	0
Career			6	4	0	18	20	38	11	14	0.7	0.0	3.0	3.3	6.3	1.8	2.3	0
