= Matthew Parker (footballer) =

Australian rules footballer (born 1996)

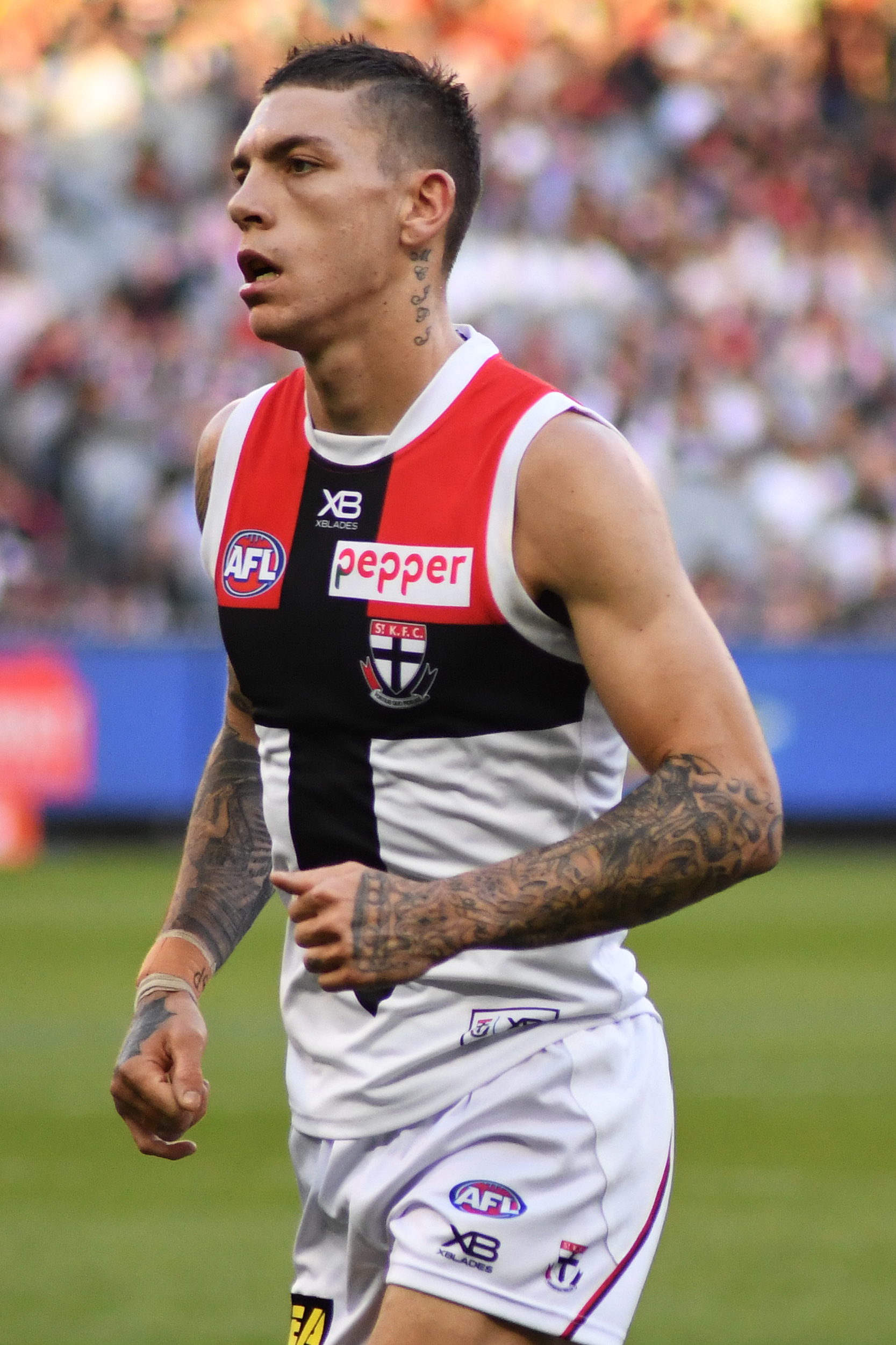
- Parker playing for St Kilda in April 2019

Personal information
- Full name: Matthew Parker
- Nicknames: Matt, MP-400, Parker-horse
- Born: 25 January 1996 (age 30)
- Original team: South Fremantle (WAFL)
- Draft: No. 47, 2018 national draft, St Kilda; No. 10, 2021 mid-season rookie draft, Richmond
- Height: 190 cm (6 ft 3 in)
- Weight: 75 kg (165 lb)
- Position: Forward / midfielder

Playing career^{1}
Years	Club	Games (Goals)
2019–2020	St Kilda	19 (16)
2021–2022	Richmond	11 (7)
Total		30 (23)
- ^{1} Playing statistics correct to the end of 2024 WAFL season.

Matthew Parker (born 25 January 1996) is an Australian rules footballer who played for the Richmond Football Club and St Kilda Football Club in the Australian Football League (AFL). He played 30 matches over 4 seasons in his AFL career.

== AFL career ==
=== St Kilda (2019–2020) ===
Parker was drafted to the Saints with pick 47 in the 2018 AFL draft from South Fremantle in the WAFL. He played 17 games in his debut season but managed only 2 in his 2nd and final season with the club. He was delisted at the end of 2020.

=== Return to South Fremantle (2021) ===
After being delisted by St Kilda, Parker returned to his former WAFL club South Fremantle. He was selected to represent Western Australia in the interstate match against South Australia in 2021.

=== Richmond (2021–2022) ===
In the 2021 AFL Mid-Season Rookie Draft, Parker was selected by Richmond with the 10th pick. Parker played his first game with Richmond in round 18 against the Brisbane Lions.

On the 23rd of September, Parker committed to a new one-year deal to remain at Punt Road in 2022.

In 2022 Parker called time on his Richmond career and returned home to Western Australia for family reasons.

=== Post AFL (2023–) ===
Parker again joined South Fremantle for the 2023 season. After an injury interrupted 2023, Parker had a much improved 2024 season, being selected to represent Western Australia against South Australia. In 2025 he was a member of South a Fremantle's premiership winning team, finished second in the Sandover Medal and was also awarded the club's best and fairest award, the WJ Hughes Medal.

== AFL statistics ==
Legend
G	Goals	K	Kicks	D	Disposals	T	Tackles
B	Behinds	H	Handballs	M	Marks

Season	Team	No.	Games	Totals							Averages (per game)						
Season	Team	No.	Games	G	B	K	H	D	M	T	G	B	K	H	D	M	T
2019	St Kilda	34	17	16	13	119	61	180	50	51	0.9	0.8	7.0	3.6	10.6	2.9	3.0
2020 (Note: The 2020 season was played with 17 home-and-away matches per team (down from 22) and 16-minute quarters with time on (down from 20-minute quarters with time on) due to the impact of the COVID-19 pandemic.)	St Kilda	34	2	0	2	8	5	13	1	5	0.0	1.0	4.0	2.5	6.5	0.5	2.5
2021	Richmond	37	6	3	3	47	32	79	18	29	0.5	0.5	7.8	5.3	13.2	3.0	4.8
2022	Richmond	37	5	4	3	40	19	59	22	9	0.8	0.6	8.0	3.8	11.8	4.4	1.8
Career			30	23	21	214	117	331	91	94	0.8	0.7	7.1	3.9	11.0	3.0	3.1
