= Carter Michael =

Australian rules footballer

Personal information
- Full name: Carter Michael
- Born: 22 May 2002 (age 24)
- Original team: Maroochydore (QAFL)/Brisbane Lions Academy
- Draft: 2020 Category B Rookie Selection
- Debut: Round 17, 2022, Brisbane Lions vs. Essendon, at The Gabba
- Height: 188 cm (6 ft 2 in)
- Weight: 83 kg (183 lb)
- Position: Half-back

Playing career^{1}
Years	Club	Games (Goals)
2021–2024	Brisbane Lions	1 (1)
Total		1 (1)
- ^{1} Playing statistics correct to the end of the 2024 season.

Carter Michael (born 22 May 2002) is a former professional Australian rules footballer who last played for the Brisbane Lions in the Australian Football League (AFL).

== Early life ==
Michael was raised on the Sunshine Coast, Queensland. He attended Auskick at the Sunshine Coast. Carter played both junior and senior football with Maroochydore in the (QAFL). He was identified by the Brisbane Lions as a potential player as and added to the Under 18 Brisbane Lions Academy as a 16 year old. Michael went on to represent Queensland at Under 17 level at the National Championships. He was taken by the Lions as a 2020 Category B Rookie Selection and spent two years developing in the VFL with the Lions reserves.

He was educated at Siena Catholic College.

== AFL career ==
Carter made his debut in round 17, 2022 and kicked a goal in his first game.

== Statistics ==
Updated to the end of the 2022 season.

Legend
G	Goals	K	Kicks	D	Disposals	T	Tackles
B	Behinds	H	Handballs	M	Marks

Season	Team	No.	Games	Totals							Averages (per game)						
Season	Team	No.	Games	G	B	K	H	D	M	T	G	B	K	H	D	M	T
2021	Brisbane Lions	39	0	–	–	–	–	–	–	–	–	–	–	–	–	–	–
2022	Brisbane Lions	39	1	1	0	7	1	8	3	2	1.0	0.0	7.0	1.0	8.0	3.0	2.0
Career			1	1	0	7	1	8	3	2	1.0	0.0	7.0	1.0	8.0	3.0	2.0
