= Anthony Scott (footballer) =

Australian rules footballer (born 1995)

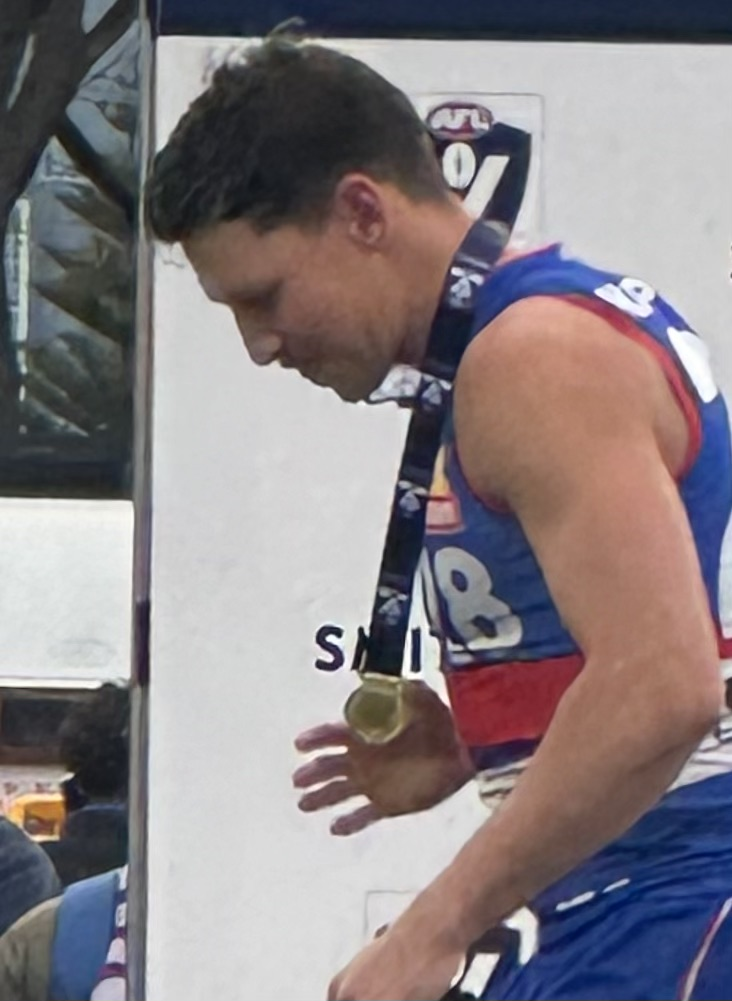
- Scott in 2025

Personal information
- Born: 28 February 1995 (age 31)
- Original teams: Footscray reserves (VFL)/ Old Trinity (VAFA)
- Draft: 2021 pre-season Supplemental Selection Period, Western Bulldogs
- Debut: 19 March 2021, Western Bulldogs vs. Collingwood, at Melbourne Cricket Ground
- Height: 180 cm (5 ft 11 in)
- Weight: 76 kg (168 lb)
- Position: Midfielder / Forward

Playing career
| Years | Club | Games (Goals) |
| 2021–2025 | Western Bulldogs | 59 (29) |

Career highlights
- VFL premiership player: 2025

Anthony Scott (born 28 February 1995) is a former professional Australian rules footballer who played for the Western Bulldogs in the Australian Football League (AFL). He was recruited by Western Bulldogs through the 2021 Pre-season supplemental selection period.

== Early football ==
Scott played for Old Trinity in the Victorian Amateur Football Association, after being undrafted in his draft year in 2013. He won the league's rising star award after a stellar 2014 season. After spending time with Richmond in the VFL, he began to gain interest from the Western Bulldogs and St Kilda in 2018. He went to Footscray in the VFL in 2019, and was named vice-captain in 2020, although the season was cancelled due to the impact of the COVID-19 pandemic.

== AFL career ==
Scott debuted for the Western Bulldogs in the opening round of the 2021 AFL season, where they secured a 16-point win over Collingwood. On debut, Scott picked up 16 disposals, 5 inside 50s and 1 mark. It was revealed Scott had signed a two-year contract extension with the Bulldogs, tying him to the club until the end of the 2023 season. After more consistent games played for the Dogs with 14 Games in 2022 as well as playing every game but 1 in 2023 Scott was awarded yet another 2 year contract Extension at the end of the 2023 season tying him again to the Bulldogs till the end of the 2025 season.

Scott was delisted at the end of the 2025 AFL season, after 59 games for the Western Bulldogs across 5 seasons.

== Honours & Achievements ==
- Individual
  - Chris Grant Medal - Western Bulldogs Best First Year Player: 2021

== Statistics ==
Legend
| G | Goals | K | Kicks | D | Disposals | T | Tackles |
| B | Behinds | H | Handballs | M | Marks |

| Season | Team | No. | Games | Totals | | | | | | | Averages (per game) | | | | | | | Votes |
| Season | Team | No. | Games | G | B | K | H | D | M | T | G | B | K | H | D | M | T | Votes |
|---|---|---|---|---|---|---|---|---|---|---|---|---|---|---|---|---|---|---|
| 2021 | Western Bulldogs | 28 | 21 | 10 | 8 | 88 | 95 | 183 | 33 | 35 | 0.5 | 0.4 | 4.2 | 4.5 | 8.7 | 1.6 | 1.7 | 0 |
| 2022 | Western Bulldogs | 28 | 14 | 7 | 3 | 102 | 61 | 163 | 48 | 20 | 0.5 | 0.2 | 7.3 | 4.4 | 11.6 | 3.4 | 1.4 | 0 |
| 2023 | Western Bulldogs | 28 | 22 | 12 | 6 | 132 | 105 | 237 | 53 | 55 | 0.5 | 0.3 | 6.0 | 4.8 | 10.8 | 2.4 | 2.5 | 0 |
| 2024 | Western Bulldogs | 28 | 2 | 0 | 1 | 7 | 3 | 10 | 6 | 1 | 0.0 | 0.5 | 3.5 | 1.5 | 5.0 | 3.0 | 0.5 | 0 |
| 2025 | Western Bulldogs | 28 | 0 | — | — | — | — | — | — | — | — | — | — | — | — | — | — | 0 |
| Career | | | 59 | 29 | 18 | 329 | 264 | 593 | 140 | 111 | 0.5 | 0.3 | 5.6 | 4.5 | 10.1 | 2.4 | 1.9 | 0 |
