= Dominic Bedendo =

Australian rules footballer (born 2003)

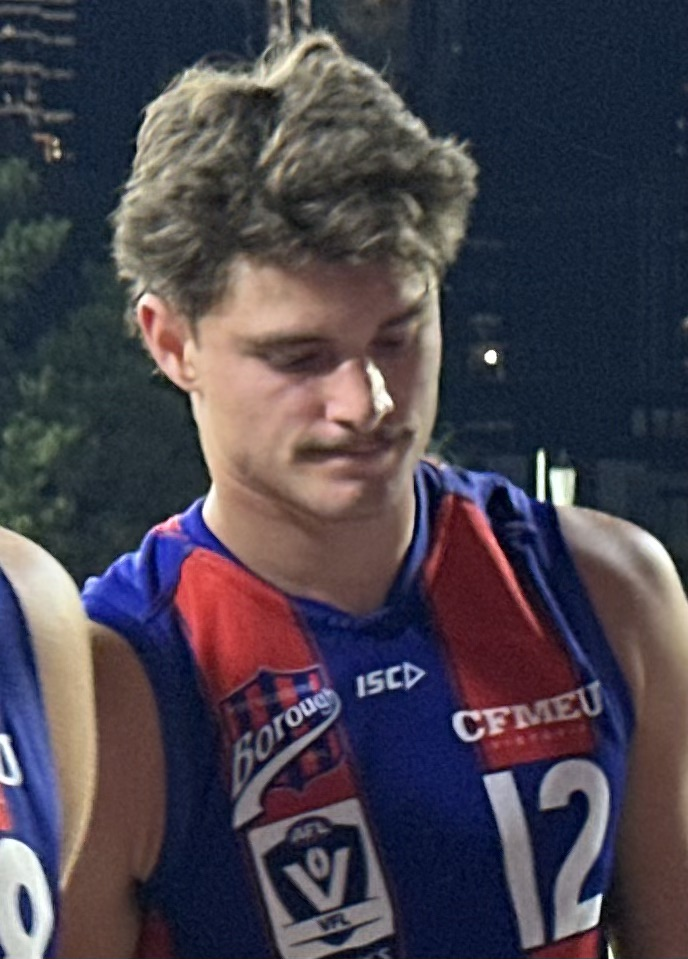
- Bedendo in 2025

Personal information
- Full name: Dominic Bedendo
- Born: 9 July 2002 (age 24)
- Original teams: Myrtleford, Murray Bushrangers (Talent League)
- Draft: No. 55, 2020 AFL draft
- Height: 191 cm (6 ft 3 in)
- Position: Defender

Club information
- Current club: Fremantle

Playing career^{1}
Years	Club	Games (Goals)
2021–2024	Western Bulldogs	2 (1)
2027–	Fremantle	0 (0)
Total		2 (1)
- ^{1} Playing statistics correct to the end of FW1, 2024.

Dominic Bedendo (born 9 July 2002) is an Australian rules footballer who plays for the Fremantle Football Club in the Australian Football League (AFL). He previously played professionally for the Western Bulldogs between 2021 and 2024.

== Career ==
Bedendo grew up in Myrtleford and played for Myrtleford and Murray Bushrangers prior to being drafted in the 2020 AFL draft.

After spending time in the VFL with Footscray, he made his debut for the Bulldogs in their 2022 Round 16 loss to Brisbane, kicking a goal on debut.

After only managing two games over four seasons at the club, he was delisted at the end of the 2024 season.

After two years with Port Melbourne in the VFL, Bedendo returned to the AFL, signing with Fremantle as a delisted free agent.
