= Jackson Hately =

Australian rules footballer (born 2000)

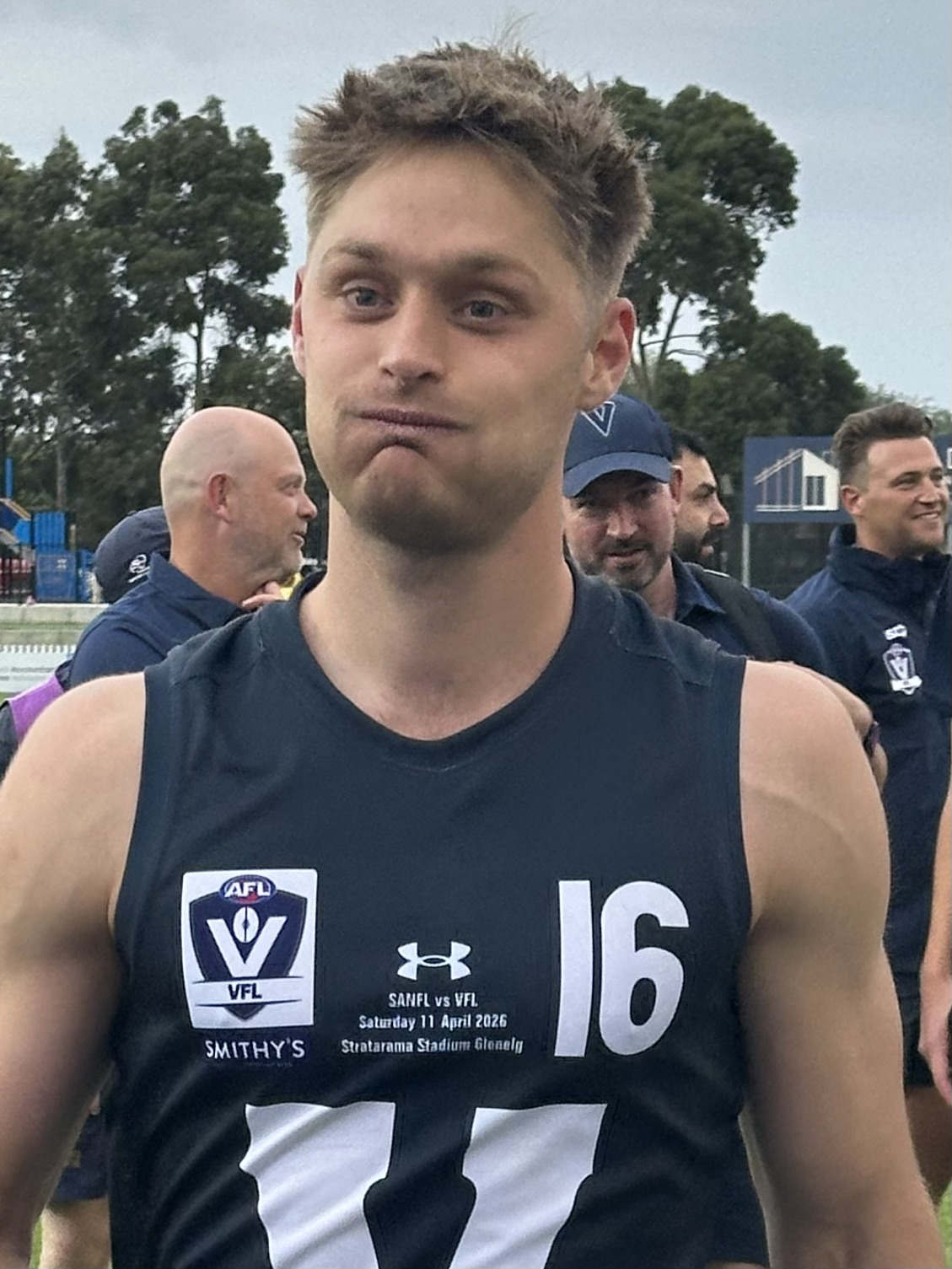
- Hately representing the VFL in 2026

Personal information
- Born: 21 October 2000 (age 26); Canberra, ACT
- Original team: Central District (SANFL)
- Draft: No. 14, 2018 national draft
- Debut: 20 April 2019, Greater Western Sydney vs. Fremantle, at Manuka Oval
- Height: 191 cm (6 ft 3 in)
- Weight: 91 kg (201 lb)
- Position: Midfielder

Club information
- Current club: Adelaide
- Number: 6

Playing career^{1}
Years	Club	Games (Goals)
2019–2020	Greater Western Sydney	13 (2)
2021–2023	Adelaide	15 (2)
Total		28 (4)
- ^{1} Playing statistics correct to the end of Round 19 2023.

Jackson Hately (born 21 October 2000) is a former Australian rules footballer who last played for the Adelaide Football Club in the Australian Football League (AFL). He previously played for Greater Western Sydney and currently plays for Essendon in the VFL.

== Early career ==
Born in Canberra before growing up in Adelaide. Hately played 12 South Australian National Football League (SANFL) games for Central District in 2018 as a seventeen year old. He won All-Australian selection for his performances for South Australia in the NAB Under-18 National Championships. He was selected as a first round pick, and number 14 overall in the 2018 national draft.

== AFL career ==
He made his senior debut against Fremantle in round 5 of the 2019 season. After 13 games in two years, Hately requested a trade so he could return to Adelaide. He joined Adelaide in the 2020 pre season draft.

== Statistics ==
Statistics are correct to the end of Round 16 2021

Legend
G	Goals	K	Kicks	D	Disposals	T	Tackles
B	Behinds	H	Handballs	M	Marks

Season	Team	No.	Games	Totals							Averages (per game)						
Season	Team	No.	Games	G	B	K	H	D	M	T	G	B	K	H	D	M	T
2019	Greater Western Sydney	9	7	2	1	60	52	112	33	24	0.3	0.1	8.6	7.4	16.0	4.7	3.4
2020	Greater Western Sydney	9	6	0	0	47	35	82	28	14	0.0	0.0	7.8	5.8	13.7	4.7	2.3
2021	Adelaide	6	3	0	2	18	17	35	7	12	0.0	0.6	6.0	5.6	11.6	2.3	4.0
Career			16	2	3	125	104	229	68	50	0.1	0.1	7.8	6.5	14.3	4.2	3.1
