= Maroochydore Football Club =

Maroochydore Roos

Names
- Full name: Maroochydore Australian Football Club
- Nickname: Roos
- Club song: "Out we come, out we come, out we come to play!"

2026 QAFL season
- After finals: 5th (Elimination Final)
- Home-and-away season: 4th

Club details
- Founded: 1969; 57 years ago
- Colours
- Competition: QAFL
- President: Matt Bury
- Coach: Steve Wildschut (QAFL); Leigh Redpath (QAFLW)
- Captain(s): Josh Govan (QAFL); Ellen Hopkins (QAFLW)
- Premierships: Men's; Sunshine Coast AFL: 1970, 1971, 1972, 1974, 1978, 1979, 1982, 1983, 1984, 1986, 1989; Brisbane AFL: 1993, 1994, 1995, 1996; QFA Division 1: 2017, 2018; Women's; QWAFA: 2016
- Ground: Maroochydore Multisports Complex (capacity: 5,000)

Uniforms
Home	Away

Other information
- Official website: maroochydoreroos.com

Maroochydore Australian Football Club is an Australian rules football club based at Maroochydore on the Sunshine Coast, Queensland which competes in AFL Queensland leagues in South East Queensland. Their men's team have been playing in the QAFL since 2020 and their women's team have been playing in the QAFLW since 2017.

== History ==
=== Origins ===
The Maroochydore Australian Football Club was formed to compete in the Sunshine Coast Australian Football League. This was an amateur competition that was formed in 1970 and continued until 1992. Other foundation clubs were Noosa and Nambour.

In 1993, the clubs from the competition played in the Brisbane Australian Football League, and later split up into various AFL South Queensland Divisions.

=== Queensland League ===
In 1998 Maroochydore was elevated to the major state competition in Queensland, in 32 matches Maroochydore won five. At the end of 1999 the Senior club was forced to fold and many players moved to the Northern Eagles.

=== Merger & demerger ===
In 2004 Maroochydore had a desire to play in the Pineapple Hotel Cup, to overcome a lack of competitiveness the club opted to merge with the North Shore Jets. Seven years after Maroochydore and Northshore amalgamated for mutual gain in the senior ranks, the former has severed the partnership and gone it alone.

The decision to de-amalgamate was reached when Maroochydore held a special general meeting on 29 March. The new entity would be known as the Maroochydore Australian Football Club, or the Roos. That was the name of the club when it folded at the end of the 1999 season, before its rebirth as Maroochy Northshore for the start of the 2005 season. Northshore would be known as the Northshore Jets Australian Football Club.

== Recent season results ==
=== Men's ===
Season	Division	Result	No. of teams in division
2011	AFLQ Premier Division	10th	11
2012	SEQAFL Division 1	8th	11
2013	SEQAFL Division 1	8th	12
2014	QFA North	4th	8
2015	QFA North	2nd	7
2016	QFA North	2nd	6
2017	QFA Division 1	Premiers	10
2018	QFA Division 1	Premiers	10
2019	QFA Division 1	2nd	9
2020	QAFL	5th	9
2021	QAFL	2nd	11
2022	QAFL	7th	12
2023	QAFL	8th	12
2024	QAFL	7th	12
2025	QAFL		13

=== Women's ===
Season	Division	Result	No. of teams in division
2016	QWAFA	Premiers	13
2017	QWAFL	6th	7
2018	QWAFL	7th	7
2019	QAFLW	4th	8
2020	QAFLW	4th	8
2021	QAFLW	3rd	8
2022	QAFLW	4th	8
2023	QAFLW	7th	8
2024	QAFLW	7th	8
2025	QAFLW		10

== Premiers ==
=== Men's ===
- Sunshine Coast AFL (11): 1970, 1971, 1972, 1974, 1978, 1979, 1982, 1983, 1984, 1986, 1989
- Brisbane AFL (4): 1993, 1994, 1995, 1996
- QFA Division 1 (2): 2017, 2018

=== Women's ===
- QWAFA (1): 2016

=== Current squad ===
Maroochydore Roos
Senior list			New Players	Coaching staff
1 Sam McKenzie; 2 Jake Warren; 3 Benjamin Thomas; 4 Fraser Cole; 5 Mitchell Habgood; 6 Jack Taylor; 7 Lachlan Robinson; 8 Jordan Daniel; 9 Jackson Bury; 10 Mitchel Scholard; 12 Joshua Govan (c); 13 Thomas Holt; 15 Hamish Govan; 17 Lochie Laing; 18 Lukas Kangur; 19 Zac Stone	20 Mark Nielsen; 21 Brodi Finn; 22 Alex Jacobs; 23 Sam McLachlan; 24 Tom O'Leary; 28 Lochie O'Toole; 29 Jack Powell; 30 Daniel Fleming; 31 Ben Kethro; 32 Corey Bakes; 34 Hayden Smoothy; 37 Jy Bennett; 38 Bailey Hahn; 41 Caleb Silva; 44 Jesse Malthouse; 45 Brent Pearson	49 Bradley Williams; 51 Damon Eastwell; 52 Riley Matheson; 54 Hunter Moore; 55 Sam Butler; 57 James Puschmann; 64 Harrison Drew	-- Josh Wagner; -- Jack Lang; -- Ben Sloane; -- Liam Jacka; -- Darren Tanti; -- Isaac Carroll; -- Max McDonald; -- Ty Gallop; -- Riley McMillan; -- Harrison Kerr	Legend: (c) Captain(s); (vc) Vice-captain(s)

== AFL players from Maroochydore ==
=== AFL ===
- Nathan Clarke – Brisbane Lions (2000–2002)
- Josh Drummond – Brisbane Lions (2005–2012)
- Noah Cumberland – Richmond (2020–2024)
- Carter Michael – Brisbane Lions (2022–2024)
- Ty Gallop - Brisbane Lions (2025-present)

=== AFLW ===
- Shannon Campbell – Brisbane Lions (2017–present)
- Tahlia Randall – Brisbane Lions (2017–2018), North Melbourne (2019–present)
- Belle Dawes – Brisbane Lions (2020–present)
- Lily Postlethwaite – Brisbane Lions (2020–present)
- Kate Surman – Gold Coast (2020–2022), Port Adelaide (2022), Geelong (2023-present)
- Jacqueline Dupuy – Gold Coast (2022 S6-2025) Hawthorn (2026-present)
- Maggie Harmer – Brisbane Lions (2022 S6)
- Mikayla Pauga – Brisbane Lions (2022 S6–2023), Greater Western Sydney (2024-present)
- Bella Smith – Brisbane Lions (2022 S6–2023), Geelong (2024-present)
- Kiara Hillier – Brisbane Lions (2022 S7–2023), Sydney (2024-present)
- Brianna McFarlane - Western Bulldogs (2023-2024)
- Sophie Peters - Brisbane Lions (2024-present)
- Indiana Williams - Brisbane Lions (2024-2025)
- Lilly Baker - Brisbane Lions (2025-present)
