= Charlie Lazzaro =

Australian football league player

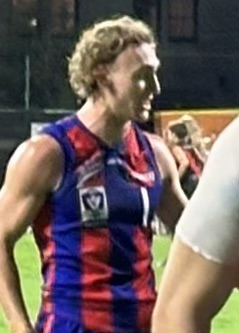
- Lazzaro with Port Melbourne in 2025

Personal information
- Full name: Charlie Jordan Lazzaro
- Born: 25 March 2002 (age 24)
- Original team: Geelong Falcons (NAB League)
- Draft: No. 36, 2020 AFL draft, North Melbourne
- Debut: 21 March 2021, North Melbourne vs. Port Adelaide, at Docklands Stadium
- Height: 180 cm (5 ft 11 in)
- Weight: 75 kg (165 lb)
- Position: Midfielder / Forward

Club information
- Current club: Werribee
- Number: 1

Playing career
Years	Club	Games (Goals)
2021–2024	North Melbourne	39 (5)

Charlie Jordan Lazzaro (born 25 March 2002) is an Australian rules footballer who plays for the Port Melbourne Football Club in the Victorian Football League (VFL). He previously played for North Melbourne in the Australian Football League (AFL) after being selected with the 36th draft pick in the 2020 AFL draft.

== Early football ==
Lazzaro started his junior football at the St Mary's Sporting Club in Geelong, where he played with long time friend and future AFL player Oliver Henry. Lazzaro attended school at Geelong College in Newtown, where he played his Football in the APS school system. Lazzaro captained the Under 16 Victorian Country Team that played in Gold Coast in 2018. Lazzaro won Geelong College's Best and Fairest in year 10 and 11 before COVID-19 affected his draft year in year 12. He also played for the Geelong Falcons in the NAB League, where he totalled 8 games and an average of 20 disposals. It was stated Lazzaro could have gone as low as pick 70 or even below that, bolting to be selected with pick 36 at the 2020 AFL draft.

== AFL career ==
Lazzaro debuted for North Melbourne in the opening round of the 2021 AFL season as the medical substitution, where he replaced Aidan Corr. On debut, he collected a single disposal after only spending 20% of the game on the ground. However, the next week saw him spend 78% of the game on the ground, returning 17 disposals, 3 marks and 4 tackles. It was revealed Lazzaro signed a two-year contract-extension with the team on 10 June 2021.

Lazzaro was delisted at the end of the 2024 season.

== Statistics ==
Legend
G	Goals	K	Kicks	D	Disposals	T	Tackles
B	Behinds	H	Handballs	M	Marks

Season	Team	No.	Games	Totals							Averages (per game)							Votes
Season	Team	No.	Games	G	B	K	H	D	M	T	G	B	K	H	D	M	T	Votes
2021	North Melbourne	35	12	3	3	55	41	96	26	21	0.3	0.3	4.6	3.4	8.0	2.2	1.8	0
2022	North Melbourne	35	12	0	5	40	52	92	22	12	0.0	0.4	3.3	4.3	7.7	1.8	1.0	0
2023	North Melbourne	35	6	0	0	15	38	53	6	18	0.0	0.0	2.5	6.3	8.8	1.0	3.0	0
2024	North Melbourne	35	9	2	0	42	57	99	17	19	0.2	0.0	4.7	6.3	11.0	1.9	2.1	0
2025	North Melbourne	35	0	—	—	—	—	—	—	—	—	—	—	—	—	—	—	0
Career			39	5	8	152	188	340	71	70	0.1	0.2	3.9	4.8	8.7	1.8	1.8	0
