= Blake Acres =

Australian rules footballer

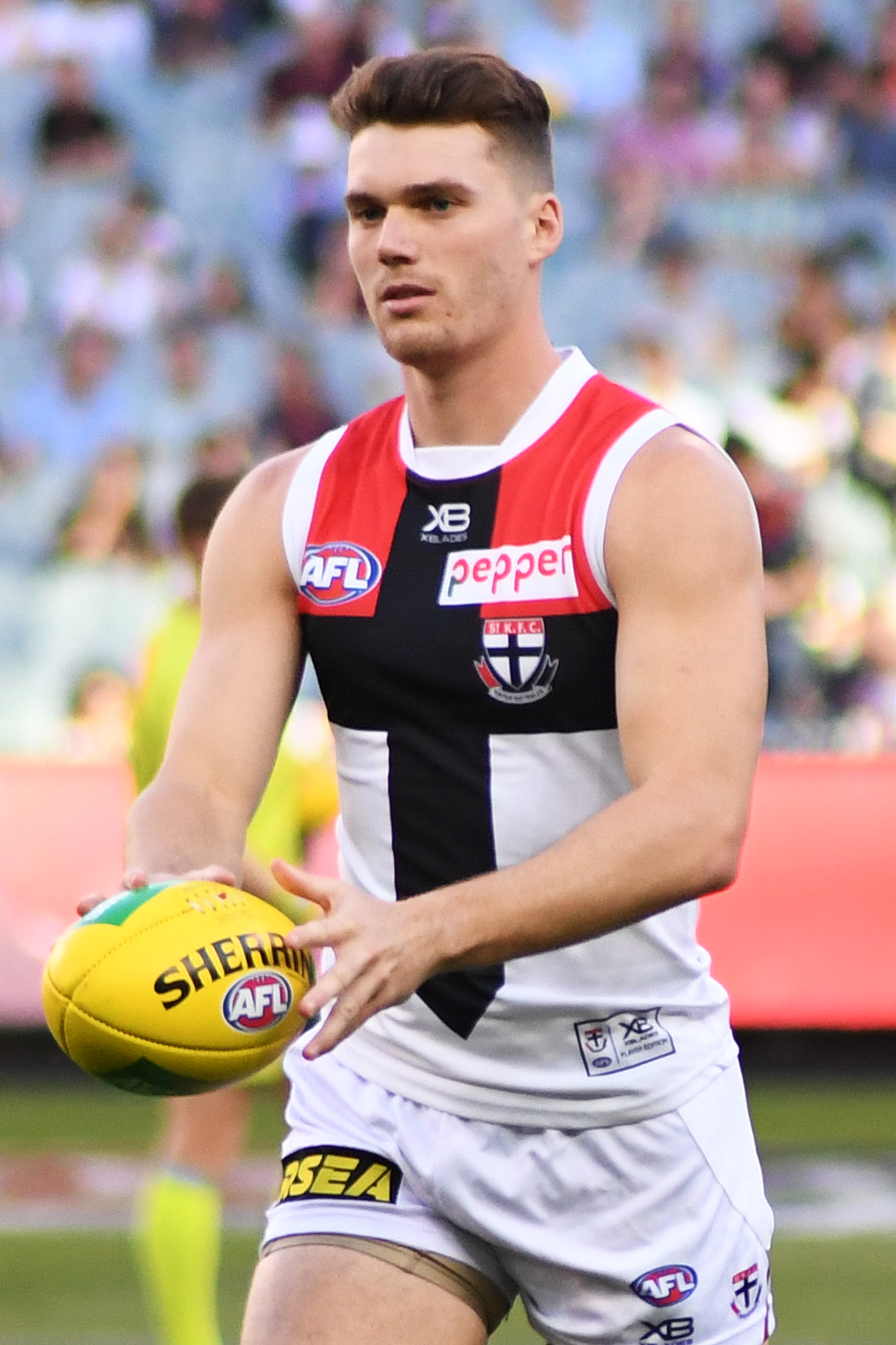
- Acres playing for St Kilda in April 2019

Personal information
- Full name: Blake Acres
- Nicknames: Blacres, sheriff
- Born: 7 October 1995 (age 31)
- Original team: West Perth (WAFL)
- Draft: 19th overall, 2013 national draft
- Height: 193 cm (6 ft 4 in)
- Weight: 92 kg (203 lb)
- Position: Midfielder / defender

Club information
- Current club: Carlton
- Number: 13

Playing career^{1}
Years	Club	Games (Goals)
2014–2019	St Kilda	75 (29)
2020–2022	Fremantle	45 (8)
2023–	Carlton	79 (31)
Total		199 (68)
- ^{1} Playing statistics correct to the end of the 2026 season.

Career highlights
- AFL Rising Star nominee: 2016

Blake Acres (born 7 October 1995) is a professional Australian rules footballer who plays for the Carlton Football Club in the Australian Football League (AFL), having previously played for St Kilda and Fremantle.

== AFL career ==
Acres was selected with the 19th pick in the 2013 AFL draft by St Kilda. He made his debut in Round 7, 2014, against Hawthorn, in a game in which St Kilda were defeated by 145 points.

He earned the AFL Rising Star nomination following a breakout performance against Melbourne in Round 6, 2016.

At the conclusion of the 2019 AFL season, Acres was traded to Fremantle, along with a number of draft picks, as part of a trade to get Bradley Hill to St Kilda.

Acres made his debut for Fremantle during Round 4 of the 2020 AFL season in their clash against St Kilda. Acres played seven games during 2020 due to a hamstring injury, disrupting his start to the season. Acres returned during the latter half of the season with strong form, averaging almost 25 disposals a game. Acres played 18 games in 2021 and played in Fremantle's 2022 finals campaign.

Following the 2022 season, Acres sought to explore the trade market after being given a low-ball offer from Fremantle, and was traded to Carlton in exchange for a future third round draft pick. Acres immediately established a permanent wingman position in the Carlton team, and recorded career best numbers in disposals and rebounds.

Acres made a memorable impact in the 2023 finals series, which was Carlton's first finals series after a club record nine-year drought: in the final quarter of the six-point elimination final win against Sydney, Acres made two diving saves for rushed behinds, and kicked a steadying goal to put Carlton 14 points ahead in the 22nd minute; and in the two-point semi-final win against Melbourne, he kicked the go-ahead goal with less than a minute remaining.

== Statistics ==
Updated to the end of the 2026 season.

Legend
G	Goals	K	Kicks	D	Disposals	T	Tackles
B	Behinds	H	Handballs	M	Marks

Season	Team	No.	Games	Totals							Averages (per game)							Votes
Season	Team	No.	Games	G	B	K	H	D	M	T	G	B	K	H	D	M	T	Votes
2014	St Kilda	40	3	1	0	11	15	26	3	8	0.3	0.0	3.7	5.0	8.7	1.0	2.7	0
2015	St Kilda	8	7	0	1	44	39	83	18	18	0.0	0.1	6.3	5.6	11.9	2.6	2.6	0
2016	St Kilda	8	16	7	6	160	124	284	57	50	0.4	0.4	10.0	7.8	17.8	3.6	3.1	1
2017	St Kilda	8	18	11	4	178	188	366	81	51	0.6	0.2	9.9	10.4	20.3	4.5	2.8	0
2018	St Kilda	8	12	4	7	129	129	258	47	43	0.3	0.6	10.8	10.8	21.5	3.9	3.6	1
2019	St Kilda	8	19	6	5	154	154	308	70	72	0.3	0.3	8.1	8.1	16.2	3.7	3.8	0
2020 (Note: The 2020 season was played with 17 home-and-away matches per team (down from 22) and 16-minute quarters with time on (down from 20-minute quarters with time on) due to the impact of the COVID-19 pandemic.)	Fremantle	9	7	0	0	75	59	134	40	19	0.0	0.0	10.7	8.4	19.1	5.7	2.7	2
2021	Fremantle	9	18	2	0	184	138	322	67	45	0.1	0.0	10.2	7.7	17.9	3.7	2.5	0
2022	Fremantle	9	20	6	6	287	147	434	115	54	0.3	0.3	14.4	7.4	21.7	5.8	2.7	3
2023	Carlton	13	25	10	5	319	257	576	137	62	0.4	0.2	12.8	10.3	23.0	5.5	2.5	3
2024	Carlton	13	23	13	12	293	223	516	138	64	0.6	0.5	12.7	9.7	22.4	6.0	2.8	4
2025	Carlton	13	19	5	9	210	145	355	87	54	0.3	0.5	11.1	7.6	18.7	4.6	2.8	0
2026	Carlton	13	12	3	8	150	93	243	77	27	0.3	0.7	12.5	7.8	20.3	6.4	2.3	0
Career			199	68	63	2194	1712	3906	937	567	0.3	0.3	11.0	8.6	19.6	4.7	2.8	14
