= Kaine Baldwin =

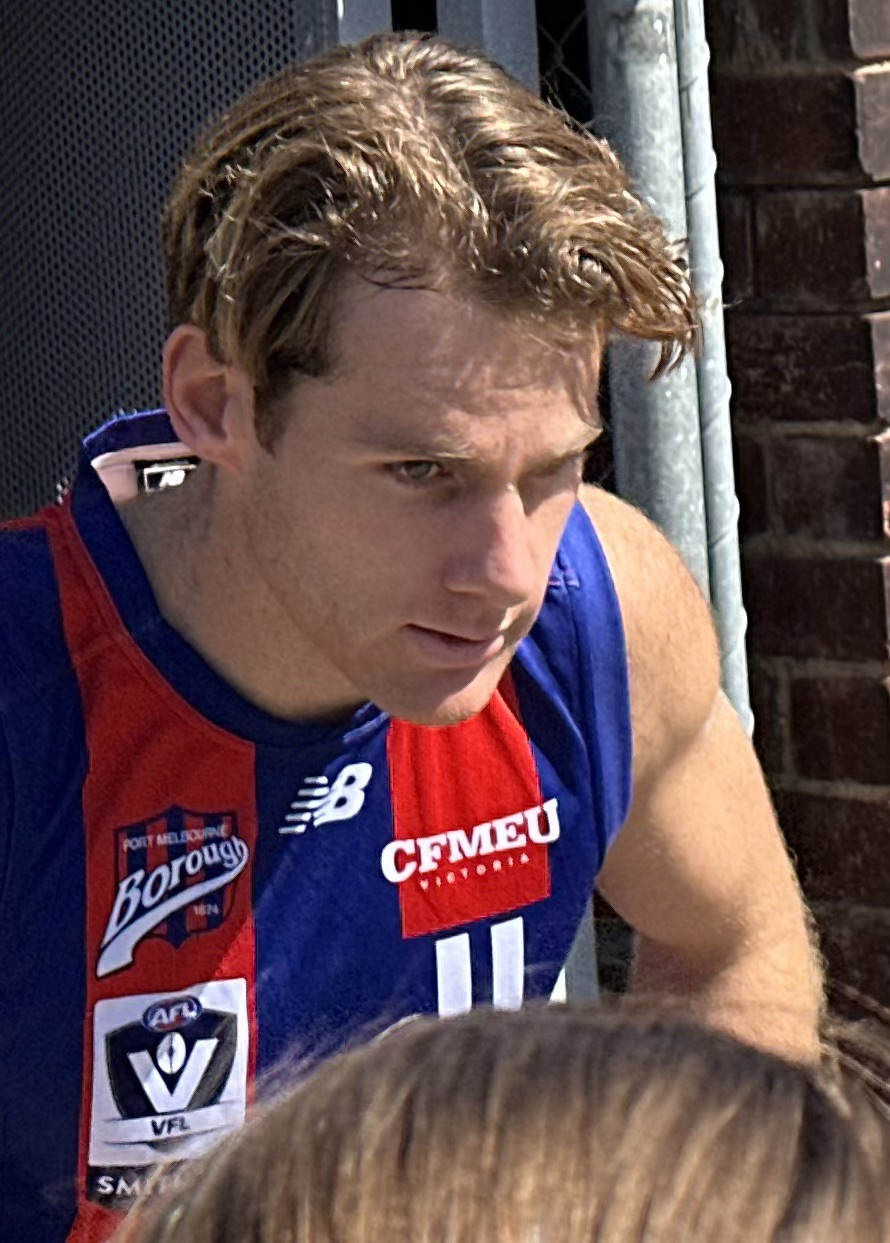
- Baldwin in April 2026

Personal information
- Born: 30 May 2002 (age 24); Adelaide, South Australia
- Original team: Glenelg (SANFL)
- Debut: Round 1, 2022, Essendon vs. Geelong, at Melbourne Cricket Ground
- Height: 193 cm (6 ft 4 in)
- Weight: 97 kg (214 lb)
- Position: Centre half-forward / Centre half-back

Playing career^{1}
Years	Club	Games (Goals)
2022–2024	Essendon	8 (2)
- ^{1} Playing statistics correct to the end of 2024.

Kaine Baldwin is a former professional Australian rules footballer who played for the Essendon Football Club in the Australian Football League (AFL).

Baldwin joined the club during the Supplemental Selection Period prior to the 2021 season. He had previously captained South Australia's under-16 team and earned All-Australian honours. Baldwin made his senior debut for Essendon against Geelong in round 1 of the 2022 season. His parents are Helen Baldwin and Andrew Baldwin, and has one sibling, Cody Baldwin. Baldwin was delisted by Essendon at the conclusion of the 2024 AFL season.

== Statistics ==
Updated to the end of 2024.

Legend
G	Goals	K	Kicks	D	Disposals	T	Tackles
B	Behinds	H	Handballs	M	Marks

Season	Team	No.	Games	Totals							Averages (per game)						
Season	Team	No.	Games	G	B	K	H	D	M	T	G	B	K	H	D	M	T
2022	Essendon	26	4	2	3	17	6	23	9	9	0.5	0.8	4.3	1.5	5.8	2.3	2.3
2023	Essendon	26	4	0	0	26	9	35	19	4	0.0	0.0	6.5	2.3	8.8	4.8	1.0
2024	Essendon	26	0	–	–	–	–	–	–	–	–	–	–	–	–	–	–
Career			8	2	3	100	15	58	28	13	0.3	0.4	5.4	1.9	7.3	3.5	1.6
