= Lachlan McNeil (footballer) =

Australian football league player

Personal information
- Born: 2 September 2001 (age 25)
- Original team: Woodville-West Torrens (SANFL)
- Draft: No. 11, 2020 rookie draft (Western Bulldogs); No. 10, 2024 rookie draft (Western Bulldogs)
- Debut: 19 March 2021, Western Bulldogs vs. Collingwood, at Melbourne Cricket Ground
- Height: 182 cm (6 ft 0 in)
- Weight: 80 kg (176 lb)
- Position: Midfielder

Club information
- Current club: Western Bulldogs
- Number: 30

Playing career^{1}
Years	Club	Games (Goals)
2021–	Western Bulldogs	85 (47)
- ^{1} Playing statistics correct to the end of round 22, 2026.

Lachlan McNeil (born 2 September 2001) is an Australian rules footballer who plays for the Western Bulldogs in the Australian Football League (AFL). He was recruited by the Western Bulldogs with the 11th draft pick in the 2020 AFL Rookie draft.

== Early football ==
Son of former Norwood wingman Tim McNeil who played 62 games for the Redlegs in the 1980s, McNeil played junior football with the South Clare Demons in the North Eastern Football League, beginning in the under 14s division and playing a total of 47 games over 4 seasons. He played for the Woodville-West Torrens junior divisions in 2019, where he was selected in the South Australia Under 18s state squad in the 2019 AFL Under 18 Championships. He was named as one of the best players for South Australia in Rounds 2 and 5.

He has always been considered to be a tough, hard-nosed inside mid who works as hard in defence as he does in offence, something that is rare in under 18 players with talent"

— Tony Bamford

During his time with the South Australian team, he played the majority of his time as a ruck-rover. McNeil played all games with Woodville-West Torrens' senior team in the 2020 SANFL season, kicking 6 goals, averaging 18.6 disposals and 2.6 clearances a game. McNeil was named a s a breakthrough player in the SANFL in April 2020, after his coach Jade Sheedy named him as an impressive player. He played a vital part in their grand final win over North Adelaide, kicking a running goal and collecting 23 disposals, 9 marks and 8 tackles.

== AFL career ==
McNeil debuted for the Western Bulldogs in the opening round of the 2021 AFL season, in their 16-point victory over Collingwood. On his debut, he kicked a goal and tallied 9 disposals and a mark. It was revealed McNeil signed a two-year contract extension with the team on 16 June 2021, tying him to the club until the end of 2023.

== Statistics ==
Updated to the end of round 22, 2026.

Legend
G	Goals	K	Kicks	D	Disposals	T	Tackles
B	Behinds	H	Handballs	M	Marks

Season	Team	No.	Games	Totals							Averages (per game)							Votes
Season	Team	No.	Games	G	B	K	H	D	M	T	G	B	K	H	D	M	T	Votes
2021	Western Bulldogs	30	13	7	8	60	51	111	21	24	0.5	0.6	4.6	3.9	8.5	1.6	1.8	0
2022	Western Bulldogs	30	16	10	7	79	55	134	32	51	0.6	0.4	4.9	3.4	8.4	2.0	3.2	0
2023	Western Bulldogs	30	13	2	4	28	52	80	12	30	0.2	0.3	2.2	4.0	6.2	0.9	2.3	0
2024	Western Bulldogs	30	12	6	11	75	68	143	20	42	0.5	0.9	6.3	5.7	11.9	1.7	3.5	0
2025	Western Bulldogs	30	21	17	14	102	92	194	31	36	0.8	0.7	4.9	4.4	9.2	1.5	1.7	0
2026	Western Bulldogs	30	10	5	1	40	63	103	21	26	0.5	0.1	4.0	6.3	10.3	2.1	2.6	0
Career			85	47	45	384	381	765	137	209	0.6	0.5	4.5	4.5	9.0	1.6	2.5	0
