= Brad Lynch (footballer) =

Australian rules footballer

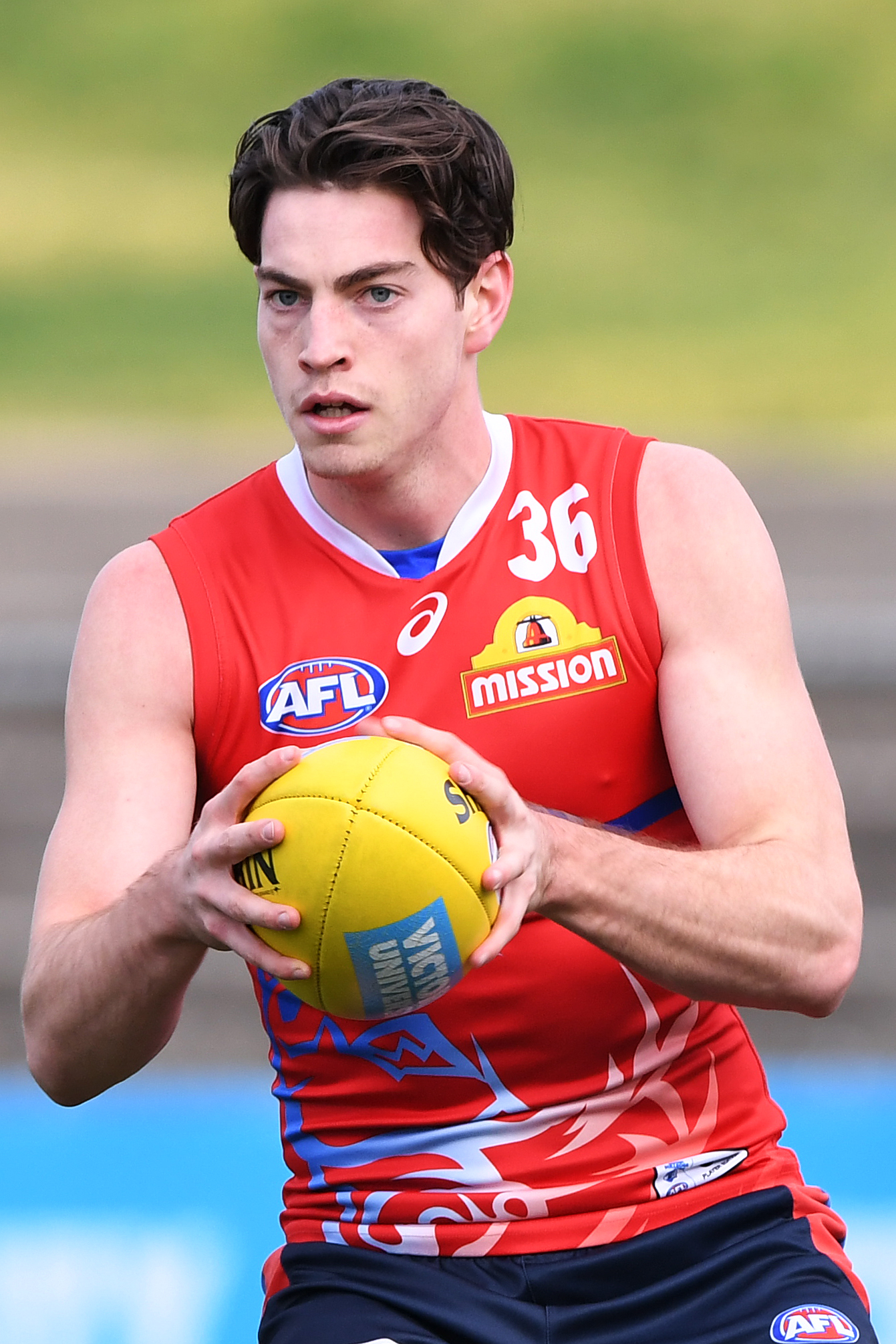
- Lynch in August 2018

Personal information
- Born: 11 July 1997 (age 29)
- Original team: Swan Districts (WAFL)
- Draft: No. 11, 2016 rookie draft
- Debut: 29 June 2018, Western Bulldogs vs. Geelong, at Docklands Stadium
- Height: 187 cm (6 ft 2 in)
- Weight: 79 kg (174 lb)
- Position: Defender

Club information
- Current club: Western Bulldogs
- Number: 36

Playing career^{1}
Years	Club	Games (Goals)
2016–2020	Western Bulldogs	9 (2)
- ^{1} Playing statistics correct to the end of 2020.

Brad Lynch (born 11 July 1997) is a former professional Australian rules footballer who played for the Western Bulldogs in the Australian Football League (AFL). Lynch played as a half-back, and has been compared to former Bulldogs captain Bob Murphy by defence coach Steven King because of his "kicking skills and lightning speed".

Originally from Mandurah, Lynch originally played for Swan Districts in the West Australian Football League. He was drafted by the Bulldogs with pick 11 in the 2016 rookie draft, their first selection. In 2016, Lynch played 22 games for the Bulldogs' Victorian Football League side Footscray, including their premiership. He played only 11 games in 2017 after hamstring injuries. Lynch also signed a one-year contract extension, tying him to the Bulldogs until 2018. In 2018, Lynch made his debut in round 15 against Geelong at Docklands Stadium. He extended his contract by two years (to 2020) after playing the last nine games of the season. Sam Power, list manager for the Bulldogs, said "We clearly believe Brad has an exciting future in the game, and we're delighted to see him commit for a further two seasons."

Lynch was delisted at the conclusion of the 2020 AFL season after playing just 9 games, all in the 2018 AFL season.
