= 2025 Richmond Football Club season =

118th Richmond Football Club season

Richmond Football Club
2025 season
- President: John O'Rourke^{(2nd season)}
- Coach: AFL: Adem Yze^{(2nd season)} AFLW: Ryan Ferguson^{(6th season)}
- Captains: AFL: Toby Nankervis^{(4th season)} AFLW: Katie Brennan^{(7th season)}
- Home ground: AFL: MCG; AFLW: Ikon Park
- Regular season: AFL: 17th (5-18-0); AFLW: 16th (2-10-0)
- Finals: AFL: DNQ; AFLW: DNQ
- Jack Dyer Medal: AFL: Tim Taranto; AFLW: Monique Conti
- Leading goalkicker: AFL: Seth Campbell (28); AFLW: Caitlin Greiser (10)
- Average home attendance: 41,534

The 2025 Richmond Football Club season is the 118th season in which the Richmond Football Club has participated in the VFL/AFL and will be the 7th season in which it participated in the AFL Women's competition.

== AFL ==
=== 2024 off-season list changes ===
==== Retirements and delistings ====
Player	Reason	Club games	Career games	Ref
Dustin Martin	Retired	302	302	
Dylan Grimes	Retired	234	234	
Marlion Pickett	Retired	91	91	
Sam Naismith	Retired	3	33	
Noah Cumberland	Delisted	25	25	
Matt Coulthard	Delisted	6	6	

==== Free agency ====
Date	Player	Free agent type	Former club	New club	Compensation	Ref
7 October	Jack Graham	Restricted	Richmond	West Coast	End of 2nd round	

==== Trades ====
Date	Gained	Lost	Trade partner	Ref
11 October	Pick 20	Pick 32	Brisbane Lions	
11 October	Pick 20	Pick 42	Brisbane Lions	
11 October	Pick 20	Pick 43	Brisbane Lions	
11 October	Pick 20	Pick 45	Brisbane Lions	
15 October	Pick 14	Liam Baker	West Coast	
16 October	Pick 10	Shai Bolton	Fremantle	
16 October	Pick 11	Pick 14	Fremantle	
16 October	Pick 18	2025 third round pick (RFC)	Fremantle	
16 October	Pick 6	Daniel Rioli	Gold Coast	
16 October	Pick 6	Pick 51	Gold Coast	
16 October	Pick 6	Pick 61	Gold Coast	
16 October	Pick 23	Pick 70	Gold Coast	
16 October	Pick 23	Pick 76	Gold Coast	
21 November	2025 first round pick (NMFC)	Pick 27	North Melbourne	
21 November	2025 first round pick (NMFC)	2025 second round pick (RFC)	North Melbourne	
21 November	Pick 58	2025 fourth round pick (RFC)	Gold Coast	

==== National draft ====
Round	Overall pick	Player	State	Position	Team from	League from	Ref
1	1	Sam Lalor	VIC	Midfielder / Forward	Greater Western Victoria Rebels	Talent League	
1	7	Josh Smillie	VIC	Midfielder	Eastern Ranges	Talent League	
1	12	Taj Hotton	VIC	Forward / Midfielder	Sandringham Dragons	Talent League	
1	14	Jonty Faull	VIC	Key forward	Greater Western Victoria Rebels	Talent League	
1	21	Luke Trainor	VIC	Defender	Sandringham Dragons	Talent League	
1	23	Harry Armstrong	VIC	Key forward	Sandringham Dragons	Talent League	
1	28	Thomas Sims	VIC	Ruck / Key forward	Northern Knights	Talent League	
1	58	Jasper Alger	VIC	Small forward	Oakleigh Chargers	Talent League	

=== 2025 squad ===
Richmond Football Club
Senior list		Rookie list	Coaching staff
1 Nick Vlastuin; 2 Jacob Hopper; 3 Dion Prestia; 5 Jack Ross; 7 Rhyan Mansell; 12 Ben Miller; 13 Hugo Ralphsmith; 14 Tim Taranto (vc); 15 Jayden Short (vc); 16 Josh Smillie; 17 Maurice Rioli Jr.; 18 Josh Gibcus; 19 Tom Lynch (vc); 20 Jacob Koschitzke; 21 Noah Balta; 22 Sam Lalor; 23 Judson Clarke; 24 Taj Hotton	25 Toby Nankervis (c); 26 Jonty Faull; 27 Thomson Dow; 28 Kane McAuliffe; 29 Jasper Alger; 30 Tom Brown; 31 Luke Trainor; 32 Samson Ryan; 33 Kamdyn McIntosh; 34 Harry Armstrong; 35 Nathan Broad (vc); 37 Liam Fawcett; 38 Thomas Sims; 40 Tyler Sonsie; 41 Sam Banks; 45 Tylar Young; 48 Steely Green; 49 Kaleb Smith	36 James Trezise; 39 Mate Colina (B); 42 Mykelti Lefau; 43 Jacob Bauer; 44 Seth Campbell; 46 Jacob Blight; 47 Ollie Hayes-Brown (B); 50 Campbell Gray	Head coach: Adem Yze; Assistant coaches: Chris Newman (Midfield Coach); Blake Caracella (TBA); Jack Ziebell (TBA); Ben Rutten (Defence); Sam Lonergan (Development); Steve Morris (TBA); Ivan Maric (ruck); Jake Batchelor (VFL); Legend: (c) Captain(s); (vc) Vice-captain(s); (B) Category B rookie; Long-term injury; (ret.)Retired; Updated: 28 February 2026; Source(s): Senior list, Rookie list, Coaching staff
