= 2024 Richmond Football Club season =

116th Richmond Football Club season

Richmond Football Club
2024 season
- President: John O'Rourke^{(1st season)}
- Coach: AFL: Adem Yze ^{(1st season)} AFLW: Ryan Ferguson^{(5th season)}
- Captains: AFL: Toby Nankervis^{(1st season)} AFLW: Katie Brennan^{(6th season)}
- Home ground: AFL: MCG; AFLW: Ikon Park
- AFL season: AFL: 18th (2-21-0); AFLW: 7th (6-4-1)
- 2024 AFL finals series: AFL: DNQ; AFLW: Elimination final
- Jack Dyer Medal: AFL: Daniel Rioli; AFLW: Monique Conti
- Leading goalkicker: AFL: Shai Bolton (34); AFLW: Katie Brennan, Caitlin Greiser (13)

The 2024 season was the 117th season in which the Richmond Football Club has participated in the VFL/AFL and the 5th season in which it participated in the AFL Women's competition.

== AFL ==
=== 2023 off-season list changes ===
==== Retirements and delistings ====
Player	Reason	Club games	Career games	Ref
Jason Castagna	Retired	134	134	
Robbie Tarrant	Retired	20	194	
Trent Cotchin	Retired	306	306	
Jack Riewoldt	Retired	347	347	
Kaelan Bradtke	Delisted	0	0	

==== Trades ====
Date	Gained	Lost	Trade partner	Ref
16 October	65th pick	Bigoa Nyuon	North Melbourne	
18 October	41st Pick	Ivan Soldo	Port Adelaide	
18 October	49th Pick	50th Pick	Port Adelaide	
18 October	2024 2nd round pick (tied to Fremantle)	50th Pick	Port Adelaide	
18 October	2024 4th round pick (tied to Port Adelaide)	50th Pick	Port Adelaide	
18 October	Jacob Koschitzke	49th Pick	Hawthorn	

==== National draft ====
Round	Overall pick	Player	State	Position	Team from	League from	Ref
2	40	Kane McAuliffe	SA	Midfielder	North Adelaide	SANFL	
2	43	Liam Fawcett	SA	Key forward	Central District	SANFL	

==== Rookie draft ====
Round	Overall pick	Player	State	Position	Team from	League from	Ref
–	–	Oliver Hayes-Brown^{(B)}	VIC	Ruck	3-year non-registered player		

=== Free agent signing ===
Date	Player	Team from	League from	Ref
1 November 2023	Sam Naismith	Port Melbourne	VFL	

=== Pre-season supplemental selection period ===
Date	Player	Team from	League from	Ref
14 February 2024	Mykelti Lefau	Richmond VFL	VFL	

=== Mid-season draft ===
Pick	Player	Position	Team from	League from	Ref
2	Jacob Blight	Defender	Peel Thunder	WAFL	
16	Campbell Gray	Key position utility	Essendon VFL	VFL	

=== 2024 mid-season list changes ===
==== Retirements and delistings ====
Player	Reason	Club games	Career games	Ref
Dustin Martin	Retired	302	302	
Dylan Grimes	Retired	234	234	
Sam Naismith	Retired	3	33	

=== 2024 squad ===
Richmond Football Club
Senior list		Rookie list	Coaching staff
1 Nick Vlastuin; 2 Dylan Grimes (ret.); 3 Dion Prestia; 4 Dustin Martin (ret.); 5 Jack Ross; 7 Liam Baker; 10 Maurice Rioli Jr.; 13 Hugo Ralphsmith; 14 Tim Taranto; 15 Jayden Short; 17 Daniel Rioli; 18 Josh Gibcus; 19 Tom Lynch; 20 Jacob Koschitzke; 21 Noah Balta; 22 Jacob Hopper; 23 Judson Clarke; 24 Sam Naismith (ret.)	25 Toby Nankervis (c); 27 Thomson Dow; 28 Kane McAuliffe; 29 Shai Bolton; 30 Tom Brown; 31 Rhyan Mansell; 32 Samson Ryan; 33 Kamdyn McIntosh; 34 Jack Graham; 35 Nathan Broad; 37 Liam Fawcett; 38 Noah Cumberland; 40 Tyler Sonsie; 41 Sam Banks; 42 Mykelti Lefau; 46 Ben Miller; 48 Steely Green; 49 Kaleb Smith; 50 Marlion Pickett	26 Matt Coulthard; 36 James Trezise; 39 Mate Colina (B); 43 Jacob Bauer; 44 Seth Campbell; 45 Tylar Young; 47 Ollie Hayes-Brown (B); 51 Jacob Blight; 52 Campbell Gray	Head coach: Adem Yze; Assistant coaches: ~~David Teague (forwards/ball movement)~~ (Note: David Teague left his position as assistant coach on 29 July 2024.); Chris Newman (Midfield Coach); Jack Ziebell (TBA); Sam Lonergan (Development); Ben Rutten (Defense); Kane Lambert (Midfield/Development); Steve Morris (VFL); Ivan Maric (ruck); Legend: (c) Captain(s); (vc) Vice-captain(s); (B) Category B rookie; Long-term injury; (ret.) Retired; Updated: 22 February 2026; Source(s): Senior list, Rookie list, Coaching staff
