= 2023 Richmond Football Club season =

116th Richmond Football Club season

Richmond Football Club
2023 season
- President: John O'Rourke^{(1st season)}
- Coach: AFL: Damien Hardwick^{(14th season)} / Andrew McQualter ^{(interim/1st season)} AFLW: Ryan Ferguson^{(4th season)}
- Captains: AFL: Dylan Grimes & Toby Nankervis^{(2nd season)} AFLW: Katie Brennan^{(5th season)}
- Home ground: AFL: MCG; AFLW: Ikon Park
- AFL season: AFL: 13th (10-12-1); AFLW: 10th (5-5-0)
- 2023 AFL finals series: AFL: DNQ; AFLW: DNQ
- Jack Dyer Medal: AFL: Tim Taranto; AFLW: Monique Conti
- Leading goalkicker: AFL: Jack Riewoldt (32); AFLW: Katie Brennan (14)
- Average home attendance: 51,420

The 2023 season was the 116th season in which the Richmond Football Club has participated in the VFL/AFL and the fourth season in which it participated in the AFL Women's competition.

== AFL ==
=== 2022 off-season list changes ===
==== Retirements and delistings ====
Player	Reason	Club games	Career games	Ref
Shane Edwards	Retired	303	303	
Kane Lambert	Retired	135	135	
Josh Caddy	Retired	79	174	
Matthew Parker	Retired	11	30	
Jake Aarts	Delisted	42	42	
Sydney Stack	Delisted	35	35	
Riley Collier-Dawkins	Delisted	11	11	
Will Martyn	Delisted	3	3	

==== Trades ====
Date	Gained	Lost	Trade partner	Ref
3 October	Tim Taranto	Pick 12	Greater Western Sydney	
3 October	Tim Taranto	Pick 19	Greater Western Sydney	
11 October	Jacob Hopper	Pick 31	Greater Western Sydney	
11 October	Pick 53	2023 first round pick	Greater Western Sydney	
11 October	Pick 63	2023 first round pick	Greater Western Sydney	

==== National draft ====
Round	Overall pick	Player	State	Position	Team from	League from	Ref
3	49	Kaleb Smith	WA	Half-back	East Fremantle	WAFL	
4	55	Steely Green	WA	Small defender	South Fremantle	WAFL	

==== Rookie draft ====
Round	Overall pick	Player	State	Position	Team from	League from	Ref
1	12	Seth Campbell	TAS	Small forward	Tasmania Devils	NAB League	
2	26	Tylar Young	NSW	Tall defender	Richmond VFL	VFL	

=== Pre-season supplemental selection period ===
Date	Player	Team from	League from	Ref
14 February 2023	Kaelan Bradtke	Corowa-Rutherglen	Ovens and Murray Football League	

=== Mid-season draft ===
Pick	Player	Position	Team from	League from	Ref
4	Matt Coulthard	Small forward	Glenelg	SANFL	
13	James Trezise	Half-back	Richmond VFL	VFL	

=== 2023 squad ===
Richmond Football Club
Senior list		Rookie list	Coaching staff
1 Nick Vlastuin; 2 Dylan Grimes (c); 3 Dion Prestia; 4 Dustin Martin; 5 Jack Ross; 6 Robbie Tarrant (ret.); 7 Liam Baker; 8 Jack Riewoldt; 9 Trent Cotchin; 10 Maurice Rioli Jr; 13 Hugo Ralphsmith; 14 Tim Taranto; 15 Jayden Short; 17 Daniel Rioli; 19 Tom Lynch; 20 Ivan Soldo; 21 Noah Balta; 22 Jacob Hopper; 25 Toby Nankervis (c)	27 Thomson Dow; 28 Josh Gibcus; 29 Shai Bolton; 30 Tom Brown; 31 Rhyan Mansell; 32 Samson Ryan; 33 Kamdyn McIntosh; 34 Jack Graham; 35 Nathan Broad; 38 Noah Cumberland; 40 Tyler Sonsie; 41 Sam Banks; 42 Judson Clarke; 46 Ben Miller; 47 Bigoa Nyuon; 48 Steely Green; 49 Kaleb Smith; 50 Marlion Pickett	26 Matt Coulthard; 36 James Trezise; 37 Kaelan Bradtke; 39 Mate Colina (B); 43 Jacob Bauer; 44 Seth Campbell; 45 Tylar Young	Head coach: Andrew McQualter (interim); Assistant coach: David Teague (forwards/ball movement); Sam Lonergan (Development); Xavier Clarke (Forwards); Ben Rutten (Defense); Kane Lambert (Midfield/Development); Steve Morris (VFL); Ivan Maric (ruck); Legend: (c) Captain(s); (vc) Vice-captain(s); (B) Category B rookie; Long-term injury; (ret.) Retired; Updated: 28 September 2026; Source(s): Senior list, Rookie list, Coaching staff
