= AFL Grand Final Sprint =

Competition in Australian football

The AFL Grand Final Sprint is a sprint running race contested by AFL players as part of the on-field entertainment on the day of the AFL Grand Final. The sprint was held each year from 1979 until 1985 and again in 1987 (when the league was known as the Victorian Football League), and then again every year since 2002. Geoff Ablett (Hawthorn / St Kilda) has won the most Grand Final sprints, with four; three of them consecutive (1979—1981).

== Sprint race ==
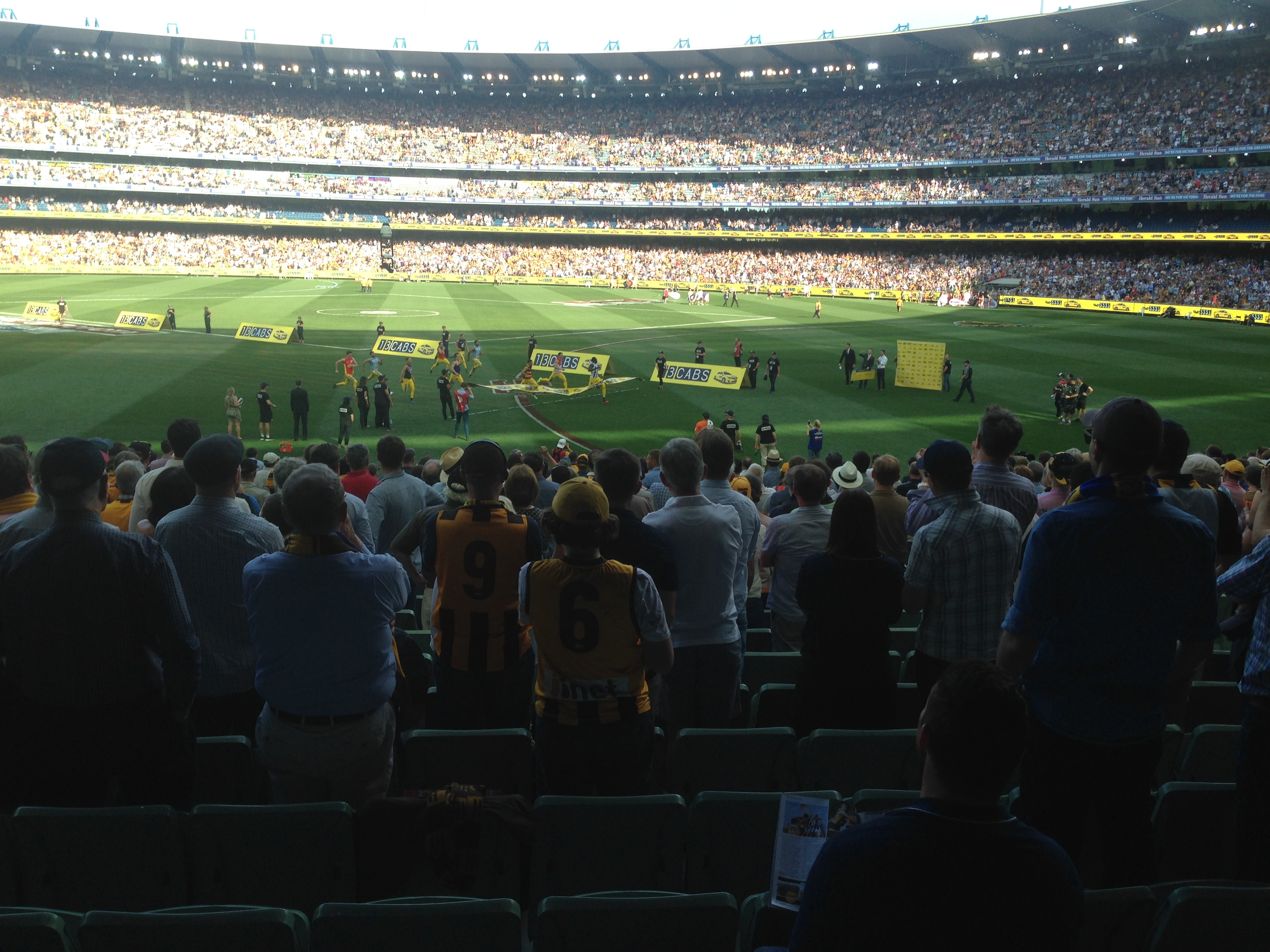
The 2015 Grand Final sprint as the competitors cross the finish line. Majak Daw of North Melbourne was the winner.

The staging running races as curtain-raisers to, or half-time entertainment during, football matches has been a common practice since the early days of football in Victoria. The establishment of a running race on the field during grand final day between players who were not taking part in the game first occurred in 1977. For the Grand Final days in 1977 and 1978, long-distance races run over a mile were staged, with each league club able to nominate up to two entrants. In 1979, the race was changed to a 100 m sprint, with one player per club taking part.

Between 1979 and 1987, the two clubs participating in the grand final had the option of providing one of their players who missed selection in the match, but they generally chose not to do so, meaning the sprint was usually contested by a field of 10 players during this era.

The race was not held from 1988 to 2001 but was reintroduced in 2002 (along with a goalkicking contest, which only lasted one year). With the number of league clubs having grown to 16 during the break in competition, a new format was adopted, with the players now split into two groups of eight for the heats (held before the grand final), and the top four from each heat advancing to the final (held at half-time of the grand final).

From 2006 until 2008, a handicapping system was used, similar to that used in the Stawell Gift.

In 2020 and 2021, the Grand Final sprint took place at quarter-time rather than half-time. In 2022 and 2023, the sprint took place before the game. In 2024, there were heats held before the game, with the final occurring at half-time.

In most years, entry has been limited to one player from each AFL club. On two occasions, two slots were open to players from regional leagues, resulting in regional league-player victories on both occasions. In 2016, suburban footballer James Shirley won the race, while taxi driver Harvinder Singh (competing because the race was sponsored by taxi company 13cabs) finished last; and in 2018, under-18s footballers Godfrey Okereneyang and Melvin Monieh came first and second, respectively. The 2021 race was limited to Western Australian participants, as border restrictions due to the COVID-19 pandemic prevented others from travelling to Perth where the match and race were held.

== Winners ==
List of AFL Grand Final Sprints, with year, winning sprinters, winning clubs, leagues represented, host city, and state and territory hosted in
Year	Winner	Club	League	Venue	City	State / territory	Ref.
1979	Geoff Ablett ^{(3)}	Hawthorn	Victorian Football League (VFL)	Melbourne Cricket Ground (MCG)	Melbourne	Victoria	
1980	Geoff Ablett ^{(3)}	Hawthorn	Victorian Football League (VFL)	Melbourne Cricket Ground (MCG)	Melbourne	Victoria	
1981	Geoff Ablett ^{(3)}	Hawthorn	Victorian Football League (VFL)	Melbourne Cricket Ground (MCG)	Melbourne	Victoria	
1982	Michael Conlan	Fitzroy	VFL	MCG	Melbourne	Victoria	
1983	Frank Marchesani	Carlton	VFL	MCG	Melbourne	Victoria	
1984	Douglas Cox	Essendon	VFL	MCG	Melbourne	Victoria	
1985	Geoff Ablett ^{(4)}	St Kilda	VFL	MCG	Melbourne	Victoria	
1986	Sprints not held		VFL	MCG	Melbourne	Victoria	
1987	Russell Richards	Melbourne	VFL	MCG	Melbourne	Victoria	
1988—2001	Sprints not held		Victorian Football League (VFL) / Australian Football League (AFL)	MCG	Melbourne	Victoria	
2002	Jared Crouch	Sydney	AFL	MCG	Melbourne	Victoria	
2003	James Walker ^{(2)}	Fremantle	AFL	MCG	Melbourne	Victoria	
2004	James Walker ^{(2)}	Fremantle	AFL	MCG	Melbourne	Victoria	
2005	Brett Deledio	Richmond	AFL	MCG	Melbourne	Victoria	
2006	Brendan Fevola	Carlton	AFL	MCG	Melbourne	Victoria	
2007	Jake King	Richmond	AFL	MCG	Melbourne	Victoria	
2008	Matthew White	Richmond	AFL	MCG	Melbourne	Victoria	
2009	Rhys Stanley	St Kilda	AFL	MCG	Melbourne	Victoria	
2010	Luke Miles	St Kilda	AFL	MCG	Melbourne	Victoria	
2011	Patrick Dangerfield ^{(3)}	Adelaide	AFL	MCG	Melbourne	Victoria	
2012	Patrick Dangerfield ^{(3)}	Adelaide	AFL	MCG	Melbourne	Victoria	
2013	Patrick Dangerfield ^{(3)}	Adelaide	AFL	MCG	Melbourne	Victoria	
2014	Jordan Murdoch	Geelong	AFL	MCG	Melbourne	Victoria	
2015	Majak Daw	North Melbourne	AFL	MCG	Melbourne	Victoria	
2016	James Shirley	Murrumbeena	Southern Football Netball League (SFNL)	MCG	Melbourne	Victoria	
2017	Connor Menadue	Richmond	AFL	MCG	Melbourne	Victoria	
2018	Godfrey Okereneyang	Coolamon	Riverina Football Netball League (RFNL)	MCG	Melbourne	Victoria	
2019	Ben King	Gold Coast	AFL	MCG	Melbourne	Victoria	
2019	Jordan Clark	Geelong	AFL	MCG	Melbourne	Victoria	
2020	Sprints not held						
2021	Josh Rotham	West Coast	AFL	Optus Stadium	Perth	Western Australia	
2022	Hugo Ralphsmith	Richmond	AFL	MCG	Melbourne	Victoria	
2023	Max Holmes	Geelong	AFL	MCG	Melbourne	Victoria	
2024	Beau McCreery	Collingwood	AFL	MCG	Melbourne	Victoria	
2025	Jed Walter	Gold Coast	AFL	MCG	Melbourne	Victoria	
2026	Jed Walter	Gold Coast	AFL	MCG	Melbourne	Victoria	

=== Total wins by club ===
List of AFL Grand Final Sprint wins by club, with total wins, clubs, player(s), and year(s) shown
Wins	Club	Player(s)	Year(s)
5	Richmond	Brett Deledio; Jake King; Matthew White; Connor Menadue; Hugo Ralphsmith	2005; 2007; 2008; 2017; 2022
3	Adelaide	Patrick Dangerfield	2011; 2012; 2013
3	Geelong	Jordan Murdoch; Jordan Clark; Max Holmes	2014; 2019; 2023
3	Hawthorn	Geoff Ablett	1979; 1980; 1981
3	St Kilda	Ablett; Rhys Stanley; Luke Miles	1985; 2009; 2010
2	Carlton	Frank Marchesani; Brendan Fevola	1983; 2006
2	Fremantle	James Walker	2003; 2004
2	Gold Coast	Ben King; Jed Walter	2019; 2025

== See also ==
- List of AFL Grand Final pre-match performances – Annual pre-match or half-time entertainment
- Fox Footy Longest Kick – Annual kicking competition
