= Paddy Dow =

Australian rules footballer

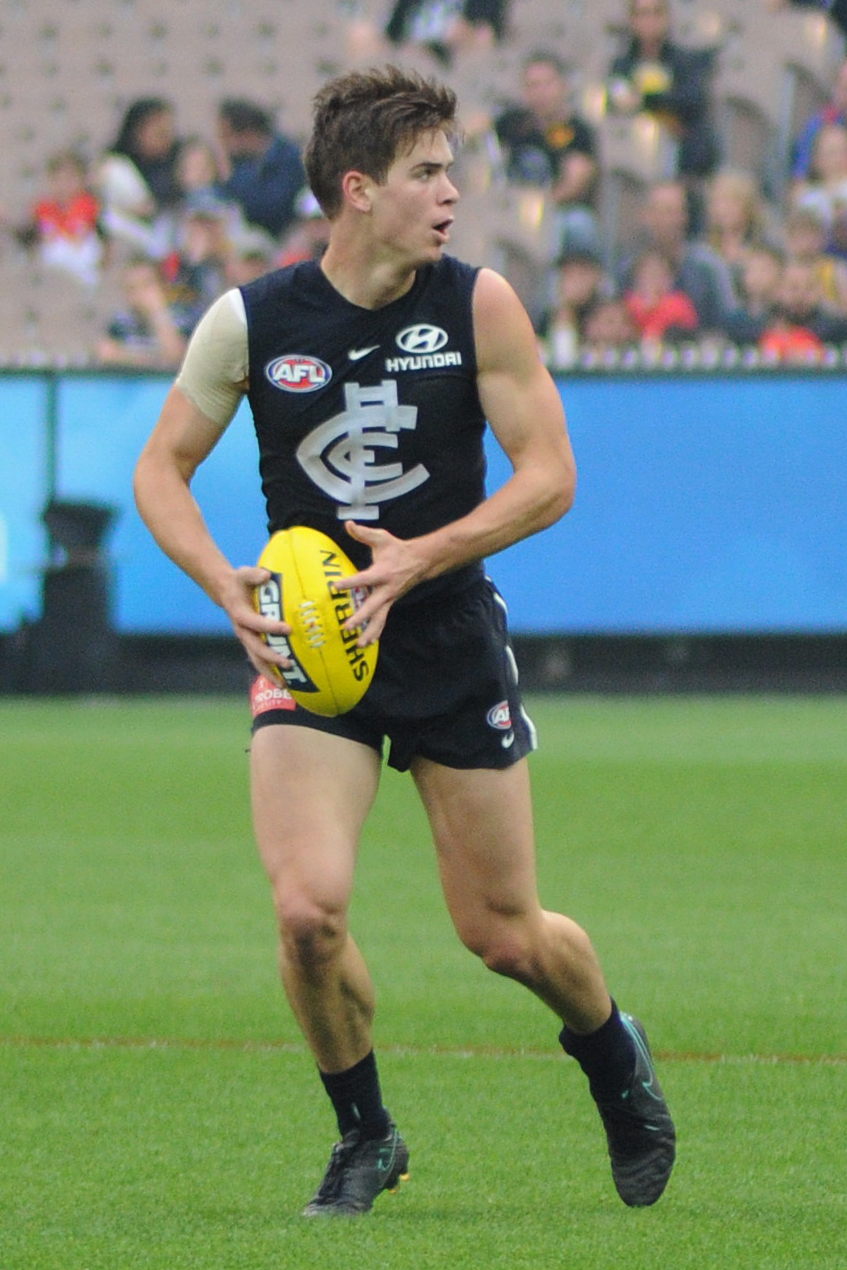
- Dow playing for Carlton in April 2018

Personal information
- Full name: Patrick Dow
- Nicknames: Paddy, Dowy
- Born: 16 October 1999 (age 27); Swan Hill
- Original team: Bendigo Pioneers (TAC Cup)/Geelong Grammar School (APS)
- Draft: No. 3, 2017 national draft
- Debut: Round 1, 2018, Carlton vs. Richmond, at MCG
- Height: 184 cm (6 ft 0 in)
- Weight: 83 kg (183 lb)
- Position: Midfielder

Club information
- Current club: St Kilda
- Number: 15

Playing career^{1}
Years	Club	Games (Goals)
2018–2023	Carlton	73 (21)
2024–2026	St Kilda	10 (3)
Total		83 (24)
- ^{1} Playing statistics correct to the end of the 2026 season.

Career highlights
- AFL Rising Star nominee: 2018

Patrick "Paddy" Dow (born 16 October 1999) is a former professional Australian rules footballer who played for both the Carlton Football Club and the St Kilda Football Club in the Australian Football League (AFL). He was drafted by Carlton with their first selection, and third overall, in the 2017 AFL draft. He made his AFL debut in round 1 of the 2018 season against Richmond at the Melbourne Cricket Ground. He earned an AFL Rising Star award nomination for his performance against Collingwood in round 14, 2018.

== Early life and career ==
Dow grew up in Swan Hill and attended St Mary MacKillop College, Swan Hill . In 2015 (year 10), he started attending Geelong Grammar School on a sports scholarship, and he was selected to play for Victoria Country at the AFL Under 16 Championships. He then started playing for the Bendigo Pioneers in the TAC Cup. In 2017, he pulled off a great performance against Gippsland Power, amassing 35 disposals and kicking 2 goals; however, his season was cut short, as he injured his shoulder in the third quarter, requiring surgery. He finished his 2017 TAC Cup season averaging 18.5 disposals, 12 contested possession and 3 tackles.

== AFL career ==
=== Carlton (2017–2023) ===
Carlton selected Dow with their first pick, number three overall, in the 2017 AFL draft. He made his AFL debut in the twenty-six point loss to Richmond at the Melbourne Cricket Ground in the opening round of the 2018 season. After the twenty-point loss to Collingwood in round 15, in which he recorded 20 disposals and 4 tackles, he earned the round nomination for the 2018 AFL Rising Star award. He played a total of 20 games in his debut year, averaging more than 14 disposals per game.

In March 2018, Dow signed a three-year contract extension with Carlton, committing his future to the club until 2022.

=== St Kilda (2024-2026) ===
At the end of 2023 after difficulties breaking into Carlton's AFL side, Dow was traded to St Kilda.

During the Christmas break following the 2024 AFL season, Dow contracted an infection which required three bouts of knee surgery. In August of 2025, he broke his collarbone in a VFL match against Richmond. Dow did not play a game during the 2025 AFL season due to injuries, but signed a one-year contract extension to the end of 2026 towards season's end.

At the end of the 2026 AFL season Dow was delisted by St Kilda.

== Personal life ==
Dow is currently studying a Bachelor of Business at Deakin University. He is the older brother of former Richmond midfielder Thomson Dow.

== Statistics ==
Updated to the end of the 2026 season.

Legend
G	Goals	K	Kicks	D	Disposals	T	Tackles
B	Behinds	H	Handballs	M	Marks

Season	Team	No.	Games	Totals							Averages (per game)							Votes
Season	Team	No.	Games	G	B	K	H	D	M	T	G	B	K	H	D	M	T	Votes
2018	Carlton	2	20	7	7	136	148	284	40	64	0.4	0.4	6.8	7.4	14.2	2.0	3.2	0
2019	Carlton	2	19	7	10	138	133	271	40	50	0.4	0.5	7.3	7.0	14.3	2.1	2.6	0
2020 (Note: The 2020 season was played with 17 home-and-away matches per team (down from 22) and 16-minute quarters with time on (down from 20-minute quarters with time on) due to the impact of the COVID-19 pandemic.)	Carlton	2	3	1	2	12	15	27	6	3	0.3	0.7	4.0	5.0	9.0	2.0	1.0	0
2021	Carlton	2	17	4	2	95	147	242	28	39	0.2	0.1	5.6	8.6	14.2	1.6	2.3	1
2022	Carlton	2	4	0	1	12	22	34	5	6	0.0	0.3	3.0	5.5	8.5	1.3	1.5	0
2023	Carlton	2	10	2	1	96	63	159	15	25	0.2	0.1	9.6	6.3	15.9	1.5	2.5	0
2024	St Kilda	15	10	3	3	73	89	162	25	35	0.3	0.3	7.3	8.9	16.2	2.5	3.5	0
2025	St Kilda	15	0	—	—	—	—	—	—	—	—	—	—	—	—	—	—	0
2026	St Kilda	15	0	—	—	—	—	—	—	—	—	—	—	—	—	—	—	0
Career			83	24	26	562	617	1179	159	222	0.3	0.3	6.8	7.4	14.2	1.9	2.7	1
