= Kieren Briggs =

Australian rules footballer

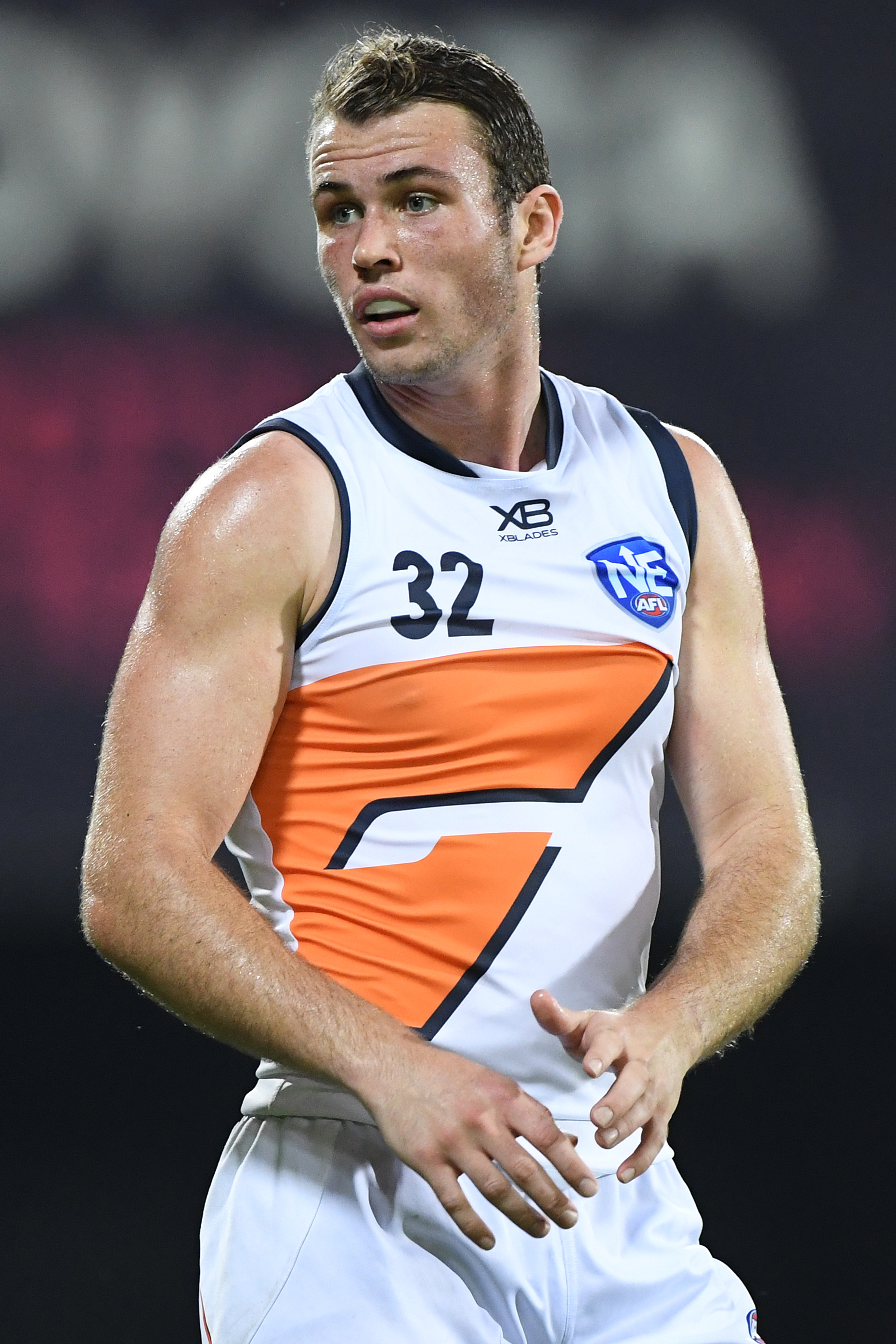

Personal information
- Full name: Kieren Briggs
- Born: 6 October 1999 (age 27); Pennant Hills, New South Wales
- Original team: GWS Academy/Pennant Hills
- Draft: Round 2, Pick #34 2018 AFL National Draft
- Debut: Round 9, 2021, Greater Western Sydney vs. Richmond, at Marvel Stadium
- Height: 201 cm (6 ft 7 in)
- Weight: 108 kg (238 lb)
- Position: Ruck

Club information
- Current club: Richmond

Playing career^{1}
Years	Club	Games (Goals)
2019–2026	Greater Western Sydney	88 (16)
2027–	Richmond	0 (0)
Total		88 (16)
- ^{1} Playing statistics correct to the end of 2026.

Kieren Briggs (born 6 October 1999) is an Australian rules footballer who plays for the Richmond Football Club in the Australian Football League (AFL).

== Early football ==
Growing up in Sydney suburb of Carlingford, Briggs prioritised soccer until he joined the Pennant Hills Football Club junior programs at age 11. Two years later, he joined the GWS Academy program. Despite Pennant Hills falling within the Sydney Swans Academy zone, due to the fact that he lived in Carlingford, he was consequently tied to the GWS Academy.

After going undrafted in 2017, he emerged as a strong contender for the 2018 draft after an exceptional year, where he was named the Most Valuable Player (MVP) for both the GWS Academy side and the Allies team in the 2018 AFL Under 18 championships. That same year, he was named as the ruckman in the championship's All-Australian team. He was then drafted by GWS in the 2018 AFL draft, when they matched the bid made by West Coast with the 34th selection.

== AFL career ==
Briggs did not debut for the Giants until late into the 2021 AFL season. He only played 9 games in two and a half seasons, before being recalled in round 10 of the 2023 AFL season. He held his position for the remainder of the year and was considered one of the best ruckmen in the league. In September 2023, after playing his first ever finals game, Briggs signed a two-year contract extension.

Following the 2026 AFL season, Briggs exercised his right to move as a free agent and joined Richmond on a four-year deal.

== Statistics ==
Updated to the end of round 22, 2026.

Legend
G	Goals	K	Kicks	D	Disposals	T	Tackles
B	Behinds	H	Handballs	M	Marks	H/O	Hit-outs

Season	Team	No.	Games	Totals								Averages (per game)								Votes
Season	Team	No.	Games	G	B	K	H	D	M	T	H/O	G	B	K	H	D	M	T	H/O	Votes
2019	Greater Western Sydney	32	0	—	—	—	—	—	—	—	—	—	—	—	—	—	—	—	—	0
2020 (Note: The 2020 season was played with 17 home-and-away matches per team (down from 22) and 16-minute quarters with time on (down from 20-minute quarters with time on) due to the impact of the COVID-19 pandemic.)	Greater Western Sydney	32	0	—	—	—	—	—	—	—	—	—	—	—	—	—	—	—	—	0
2021	Greater Western Sydney	32	5	2	0	23	26	49	9	22	85	0.4	0.0	4.6	5.2	9.8	1.8	4.4	17.0	0
2022	Greater Western Sydney	32	4	1	3	26	11	37	9	7	49	0.3	0.8	6.5	2.8	9.3	2.3	1.8	12.3	0
2023	Greater Western Sydney	32	17	4	6	165	97	262	47	77	440	0.2	0.4	9.7	5.7	15.4	2.8	4.5	25.9	0
2024	Greater Western Sydney	32	24	3	12	195	166	361	48	114	762	0.1	0.5	8.1	6.9	15.0	2.0	4.8	31.8	1
2025	Greater Western Sydney	32	20	4	4	116	106	222	39	62	569	0.2	0.2	5.8	5.3	11.1	2.0	3.1	28.5	0
2026	Greater Western Sydney	32	16	2	4	106	88	194	24	56	394	0.1	0.3	6.6	5.5	12.1	1.5	3.5	24.6	0
Career			86	16	29	631	494	1125	176	338	2299	0.2	0.3	7.3	5.7	13.1	2.0	3.9	26.7	1
