= 2018 AFL Under 18 Championships =

Youth Australian rules football competition

- Teams: 11

Division 1
- Teams: 5
- Champions: South Australia
- Larke Medal: Sam Walsh (Vic Metro)

Academy series
- Teams: 6
- Hunter Harrison Medal: Tarryn Thomas

The 2018 NAB AFL Under-18 Championships was the 23rd edition of the AFL Under-18 Championships.

The tournament was played in two divisions, with the best players from across the entire Division 2 Academy series, combined into an Allies team which would then compete in the later five team Division 1 tournament. Thus, division one was made up of 5 teams—Allies, South Australia, Vic Country, Vic Metro and Western Australia—playing each other across 5 rounds.

South Australia won the division one title for the first time since 2014, and Victorian Metro midfielder Sam Walsh won the Larke Medal as the division one best player, while Tasmanian Tarryn Thomas won the Hunter Harrison Medal for the best player in the Under-18 Academy Series.

== Fixture ==
=== Division 1 ===
| | Round 1 |
| Saturday, 9 June | Allies 10.11 (71) | def. | Vic Country 6.12 (48) | Spotless Stadium |
| Sunday, 10 June | Western Australia 12.4 (76) | def. by | Vic Metro 14.10 (94) | Optus Stadium | Report |
| | Bye; South Australia |

| | Round 2 |
| Saturday, 16 June | Allies 6.14 (50) | def. by | Vic Metro 7.10 (52) | Southport Oval | Report |
| Sunday, 17 June | South Australia 11.7 (73) | def. | Vic Country 6.10 (46) | Adelaide Oval | Report |
| | Bye; Western Australia |

| | Round 3 |
| Sunday, 3 June | South Australia 19.10 (124) | def. | Western Australia 5.5 (35) | Alberton Oval | Report |
| Sunday, 24 June | Vic Country 8.10 (58) | def. by | Vic Metro 13.6 (84) | MCG | Report |
| | Bye; Allies |

| | Round 4 |
| Friday, 29 June | Allies 9.12 (66) | def. by | South Australia 13.12 (90) | GMHBA Stadium | Report |
| Friday, 29 June | Vic Country 6.8 (44) | def. by | Western Australia 11.10 (76) | GMHBA Stadium | Report |
| | Bye; Vic Metro |

| | Round 5 |
| Wednesday, 4 July | Allies 10.11 (71) | def. by | Western Australia 12.6 (78) | Etihad Stadium | Report |
| Wednesday, 4 July | Vic Metro 9.7 (61) | def. by | South Australia 17.14 (116) | Etihad Stadium | Report |
| | Bye; Vic Country |

== All-Australian team ==
The 2018 All-Australian team

2018 Under 18 All-Australian team
| B: | Jez McLennan (SA) | Jacob Koschitzke (All) | Isaac Quaynor (VM) |
| HB: | Buku Khamis (VM) | Kyle Reid (VC) | Jordan Clark (WA) |
| C: | Luke English (WA) | Bailey Smith (VM) | Luke Valente (SA) (vc) |
| HF: | Bailey Scott (All) | Jack Lukosius (SA) | Jackson Hately (SA) |
| F: | Izak Rankine (SA) | Ben King (VM) | Rhylee West (VM) |
| Foll: | Kieren Briggs (All) | Sam Walsh (VC) (c) | Chayce Jones (All) |
| Int: | Sydney Stack (WA) | Connor McFayden (All) | Mitch O'Neill (All) |
| Int: | Will Gould (SA) | Jeremy Sharp (WA) | |
| Coach: | Tony Bamford (SA) | | |
