= Rhyan Mansell =

Australian rules football player (born 2000)

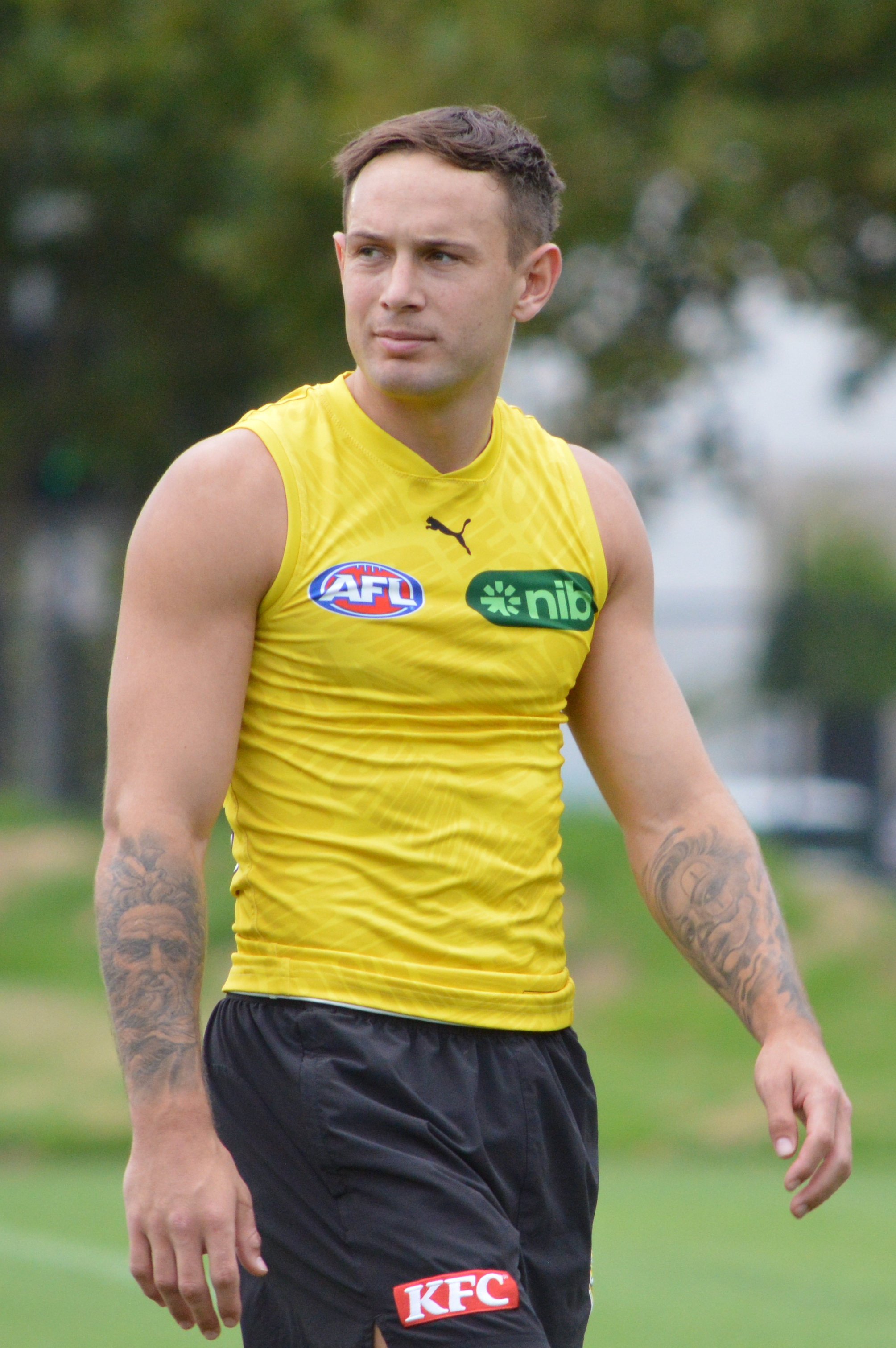
- Mansell in March 2026

Personal information
- Nickname: Nigel
- Born: 4 June 2000 (age 26)
- Original teams: Woodville-West Torrens (SANFL); North Launceston (TSL)
- Draft: Pre-season supplemental signing, 2020
- Debut: Round 4, 2021, Richmond vs. Port Adelaide, at Adelaide Oval
- Height: 180 cm (5 ft 11 in)
- Weight: 70 kg (154 lb)
- Position: Small forward

Club information
- Current club: Richmond
- Number: 7

Playing career^{1}
Years	Club	Games (Goals)
2021–	Richmond	79 (58)
- ^{1} Playing statistics correct to the end of 2026.

Career highlights
- 3x TFL premiership player: 2017, 2018, 2019; SANFL premiership player: 2020

Rhyan Mansell (born 4 June 2000) is a professional Australian rules footballer who plays for the Richmond Football Club in the Australian Football League (AFL). A pressure small-forward, Mansell was signed by Richmond in 2021, after being overlooked by all 18 AFL clubs in three consecutive draft-eligible seasons. Prior to his AFL career, Mansell was a three-time premiership player with North Launceston in the TSL and a SANFL premiership player with Woodville-West Torrens in 2020.

== Early life, junior football and state-league football ==
Mansell spent his formative years in the southern Launceston suburb of Prospect, enjoying Prospect Hawks AFL Auskick, played junior football for the North Launceston Football Club and attended high school at Prospect's St Patrick's College.

As a junior, Mansell was a member of the Tasmanian State Academy and joined the North Melbourne Next Generation Academy as a 16 year old in the program's inaugural 2016 intake. He trained with North Melbourne's AFL squad regularly as part of the program.

In 2017 Mansell played state representative football with the Tassie Mariners. In the same year, he made his senior Tasmanian State League debut with North Launceston and was a member of the club's premiership winning side in their grand final win over Lauderdale that September.

Mansell suffered a significant quad injury in early 2018, hampering his output during the national academy series season with the Mariners. Mansell was eventually selected to represent Tasmania as a member of The Allies side at the 2018 AFL Under 18 Championships, but missed two games as a result of the earlier quad injury. He returned to TSL football later in the year, and featured in another grand final win with North Launceston. At the end of the season, Mansell was invited to attend the Tasmanian AFL draft combine.

After going undrafted in both the 2018 national and rookie drafts, Mansell was eligible to be signed by North Melbourne as a category B rookie under Next Generation Academy rules, but was ultimately overlooked.

As an overage player in 2019, Mansell joined the newly re-formed Tasmania Devils side in the Victorian-based NAB League Boys competition, where he placed fourth in the club's best and fairest. He played state-league football once again for North Launceston that season, winning a third-straight TSL premiership. Mansell was once again eligible to be drafted in 2019 (including with priority academy access by North Melbourne), but was again looked over at the national and rookie drafts.

Mansell relocated to Adelaide in 2020, playing senior SANFL football with Woodville-West Torrens. He became a key player across the course of the season and featured in a finals series that included a premiership. He contributed a strong 19 disposals, eight marks and five tackles while playing as a half-back in the club's grand final victory over North Adelaide.

Despite his strong season, Mansell was again overlooked by AFL clubs at the 2020 national and rookie drafts.

=== Junior statistics ===
Legend
G	Goals	K	Kicks	D	Disposals	T	Tackles
B	Behinds	H	Handballs	M	Marks

NAB League Boys

Season	Team	No.	Games	Totals							Averages (per game)						
Season	Team	No.	Games	G	B	K	H	D	M	T	G	B	K	H	D	M	T
2019	Tasmania Devils	27	13	8	—	139	49	191	51	51	0.6	—	10.7	3.8	14.7	3.9	3.9
Career			13	8	—	139	49	191	51	51	0.6	—	10.7	3.8	14.7	3.9	3.9

Under 18 National Championships

Season	Team	No.	Games	Totals							Averages (per game)						
Season	Team	No.	Games	G	B	K	H	D	M	T	G	B	K	H	D	M	T
2018	Allies	6	2	1	—	9	4	13	2	8	0.5	—	4.5	2.0	6.5	1.0	4.0
Career			2	1	—	9	4	13	2	8	0.5	—	4.5	2.0	6.5	1.0	4.0

== AFL career ==
In the days following the 2020 draft, Mansell was offered a chance to train with Richmond under a trial period basis. Mansell impressed during his trial and in February 2021, was signed by the club under the AFL's pre-season supplemental selection rules.

Mansell began playing practice matches with Richmond reserves squad from late-February 2021 and into the opening weeks of the AFL season. Following an impressive match against the Collingwood reserves in early April, Mansell was selected to make his AFL debut in the club's round 4 match against Port Adelaide at the Adelaide Oval.

In 2024, Mansell placed seventh in the club's best and fairest award.

In 2025, Mansell placed 12th in the club's best and fairest award.

== Player profile ==
Mansell plays as pressure small forward and a link half-forward. He played his early AFL season as a shutdown small-defender and as a rebounding half-back.

== Statistics ==
Updated to the end of round 22, 2026.

Legend
G	Goals	K	Kicks	D	Disposals	T	Tackles
B	Behinds	H	Handballs	M	Marks

Season	Team	No.	Games	Totals							Averages (per game)							Votes
Season	Team	No.	Games	G	B	K	H	D	M	T	G	B	K	H	D	M	T	Votes
2021	Richmond	31	13	1	0	91	53	144	35	29	0.1	0.0	7.0	4.1	11.1	2.7	2.2	0
2022	Richmond	31	2	0	0	19	6	25	12	2	0.0	0.0	9.5	3.0	12.5	6.0	1.0	0
2023	Richmond	31	17	10	5	94	38	132	40	43	0.6	0.3	5.5	2.2	7.8	2.4	2.5	0
2024	Richmond	31	21	21	10	157	63	220	60	66	1.0	0.5	7.5	3.0	10.5	2.9	3.1	0
2025	Richmond	7	20	18	16	155	70	225	67	69	0.9	0.8	7.8	3.5	11.3	3.4	3.5	0
2026	Richmond	7	6	8	6	48	18	66	25	20	1.3	1.0	8.0	3.0	11.0	4.2	3.3	0
Career			79	58	37	564	248	812	239	229	0.7	0.5	7.1	3.1	10.3	3.0	2.9	0

== Honours and achievements ==
State-league

- 3x TSL premiership player: 2017, 2018, 2019
- SANFL premiership player: 2020

== Personal life ==
Mansell is a Palawa Indigenous Australian. His father Brett won a TSL premiership with North Launceston in 1995. He is the cousin of former North Melbourne player Tarryn Thomas.

In mid-2025, Mansell began dating Richmond AFL Women's player and league best and fairest winner Monique Conti.
