= Luke Miles =

Australian rules footballer (born 1986)

Personal information
- Full name: Luke Miles
- Born: 30 October 1986 (age 40)
- Original team: Swan Districts WAFL
- Draft: 24th overall, 2008 Rookie Draft; 93rd overall (rookie elevation), 2009 AFL draft
- Height: 185 cm (6 ft 1 in)
- Weight: 86 kg (190 lb)
- Position: Half back

Playing career^{1}
Years	Club	Games (Goals)
2008–2010	St Kilda	2 (0)
- ^{1} Playing statistics correct to the end of 2010.

Luke Miles (born 30 October 1986) is an Australian rules footballer who has played for the St Kilda Football Club in the Australian Football League (AFL) and Swan Districts Football Club in the Western Australian Football League (WAFL).

== Career ==
After attending Guildford Grammar School in Perth, Western Australia, Miles began his career with WAFL club Swan Districts, playing in the Swan Districts reserves premiership team in 2005 and winning the Swan Districts League best and fairest award in 2006. He was drafted by St Kilda with the 24th selection of the 2008 Rookie Draft and after two seasons with St Kilda's Victorian Football League (VFL) affiliate Casey Scorpions, Miles was elevated to St Kilda's senior list with the 93rd selection in the 2009 AFL draft.

Miles made his senior AFL debut in round 21 of the 2010 AFL season. He played again the next week, but was dropped from the senior team for the finals series. After winning the 2010 AFL Grand Final sprint, Miles was delisted by St Kilda on 10 October 2010.

Miles returned to Swan Districts for the 2011 WAFL season.
