= Jonty Faull =

Australian rules footballer

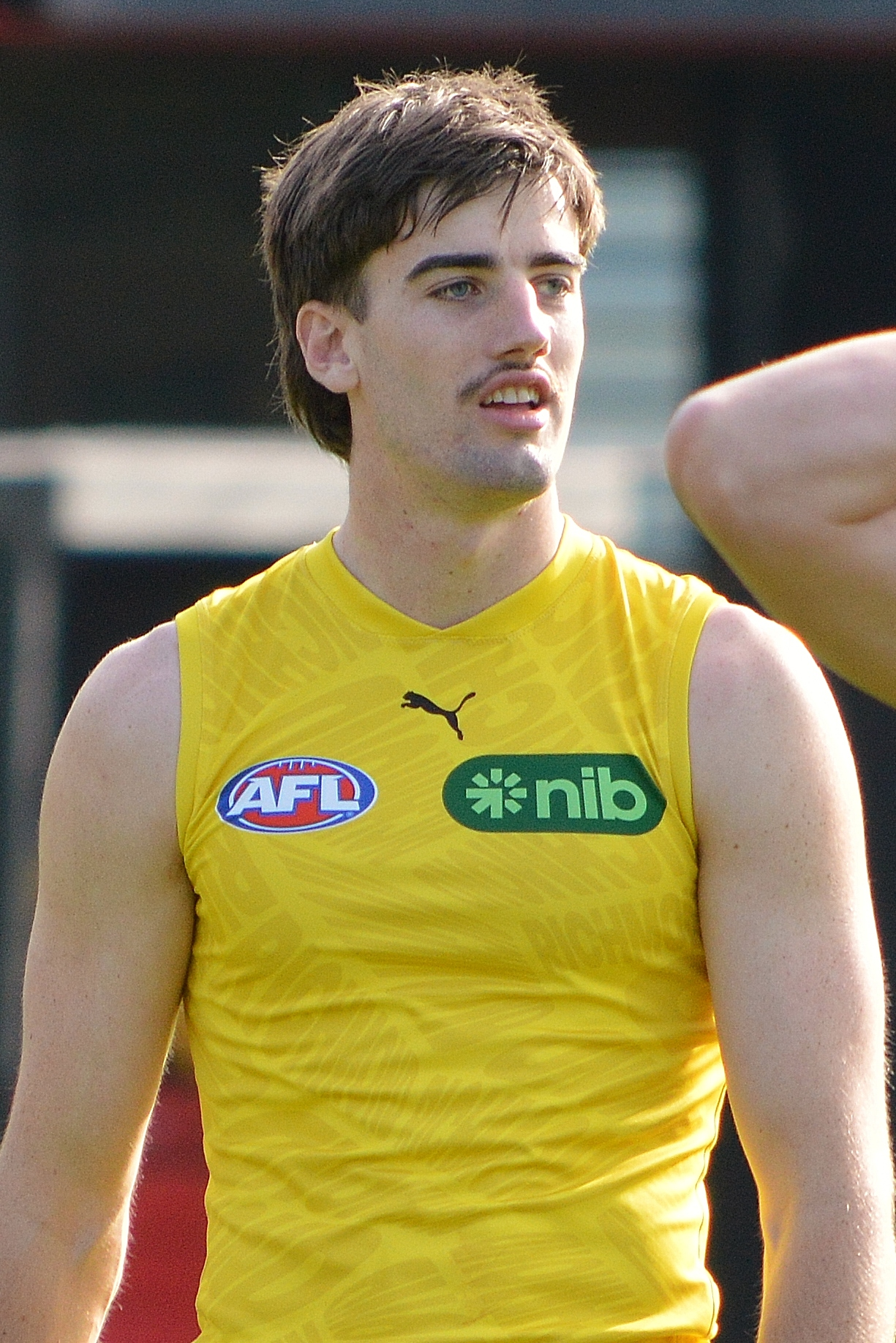
- Faull in May 2026

Personal information
- Born: 1 February 2006 (age 20)
- Original team: Greater Western Victoria Rebels (Talent League)/Redan Lions
- Draft: No. 14, 2024 AFL draft
- Debut: Round 5, 2025, Richmond vs. Fremantle, at Barossa Park
- Height: 195 cm (6 ft 5 in)
- Position: Key forward

Club information
- Current club: Richmond
- Number: 8

Playing career^{1}
Years	Club	Games (Goals)
2025–	Richmond	26 (16)
- ^{1} Playing statistics correct to the end of 2026.

Jonty Faull (born 1 February 2006) is an Australian rules footballer who plays for the Richmond Football Club in the Australian Football League (AFL). A tall forward, Faull was drafted in the first round of the 2024 AFL draft and made his debut early in the 2025 season.

== Early life and junior football ==
Faull took up football at under 10 level, playing for Lake Wendouree in the Ballarat Football Netball League. He played at the club for two seasons, before moving to the Redan Football Club, where he played the remainder of his junior football, including playing in an under-17s grand final victory. He attended high school at Ballarat Grammar School.

In 2022, Faull represented the Victoria Country region at the under-16 national championships. The following year he played top level junior representative football for Greater Western Victoria Rebels in the Talent League, kicking 20 goals across 12 games that season. Faull also made appearances for Redan's senior men's team in 2023.

Faull was a member of the AFL Academy program in the 2023/24 summer, gaining a chance to train with an AFL club ahead of his final pre-draft season. Early on in 2024, Faull suffered from stress reactions in his back which saw him sidelined for six months. He played his first match that season in June, kicking 5 goals. Faull was a key member of the Rebels' finals teams, kicking 4 goals in their quarter-final, 5 goals in the side's preliminary final victory over Oakleigh Chargers and 1 goal in their grand final loss to the Sandringham Dragons. Across 11 matches that season, Faull averaged 13 disposals, 4.5 marks and 2.5 goals a game, earning him selection in the competition's Team of the Year. Faull represented Victoria Country at the 2024 AFL Under 18 Championships, playing three matches and kicking a total of five goals.

In the week prior to the 2024 AFL draft, Faull was projected by AFL Media and the Herald Sun to be selected with the 22nd and 32nd pick, respectively.

== AFL career ==
Faull was drafted by Richmond with the club's 4th pick and the 14th selection overall in the 2024 AFL draft. He completed a limited pre-season training schedule during the summer lead in to his first season, due to recurring stress issues in his back. He returned to full fitness to play in the first match of the season for the club's reserves team in the VFL in late March. He played a further 2 matches for that side, kicking 2 goals in a win over the Brisbane Lions reserves. He made his AFL debut in round 5 of the 2025 season.

Faull went on to play the next 16 games consecutively in Richmond's senior team, including a 2 goal, 11 disposal performance against West Coast in round 19. His season was cut short in round 22 following an injury to the medial ligament in his left knee, though this did not require surgery and is not expected to affect his 2026 pre-season.

== Player profile ==
Faull plays as a tall forward, and is particularly notability for his physicality and bodywork.

== Statistics ==
Updated to the end of round 22, 2026.

Legend
G	Goals	K	Kicks	D	Disposals	T	Tackles
B	Behinds	H	Handballs	M	Marks

Season	Team	No.	Games	Totals							Averages (per game)							Votes
Season	Team	No.	Games	G	B	K	H	D	M	T	G	B	K	H	D	M	T	Votes
2025	Richmond	26	16	9	18	78	38	116	44	19	0.6	1.1	4.9	2.4	7.3	2.8	1.2	0
2026	Richmond	8	10	7	7	45	24	69	27	14	0.7	0.7	4.5	2.4	6.9	2.7	1.4	0
Career			26	16	25	123	62	185	71	33	0.6	1.0	4.7	2.4	7.1	2.7	1.3	0
