= Tom Sims (Australian footballer) =

Australian rules footballer

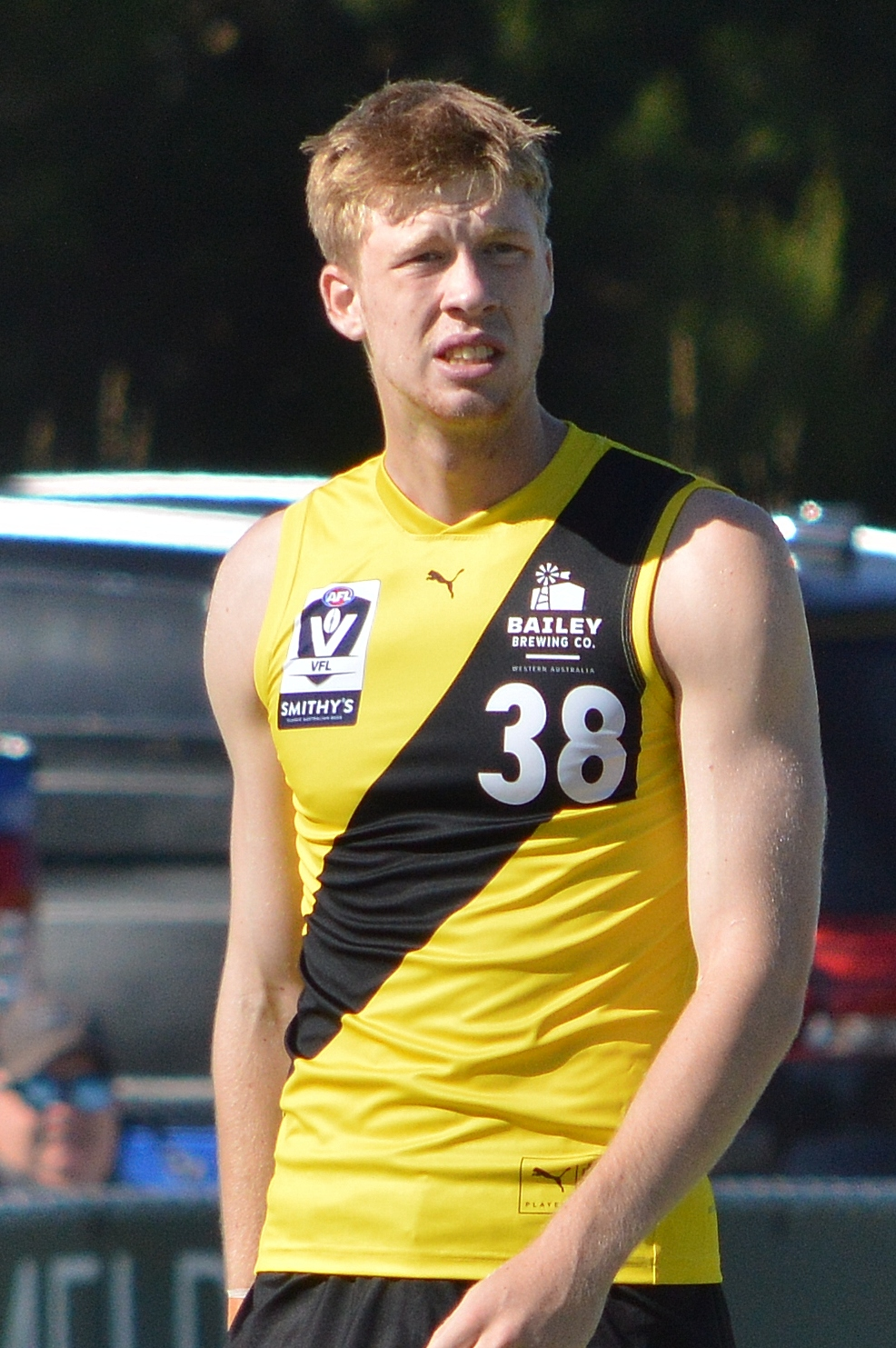
- Sims with Richmond's VFL side in March 2025

Personal information
- Full name: Thomas Sims
- Born: 12 May 2006 (age 20)
- Original team: Northern Knights (Talent League)
- Draft: No. 28, 2024 AFL draft
- Debut: Round 9, 2025, Richmond vs. West Coast, at MCG
- Height: 199 cm (6 ft 6 in)
- Position: Key forward / ruck

Club information
- Current club: Richmond
- Number: 38

Playing career^{1}
Years	Club	Games (Goals)
2025–	Richmond	11 (4)
- ^{1} Playing statistics correct to the end of 2026.

Thomas Sims! (born 12 May 2006) is an Australian rules footballer who plays for the Richmond Football Club in the Australian Football League (AFL). A tall forward and relief ruck, Sims was drafted in the second round of the 2024 AFL draft and made his debut mid-way through the 2025 season.

== Early life and junior football ==
Sims was raised in Wallan, a regional town 45 kilometers north of Melbourne. He played football for the local Wallan Junior Football Club as a pre-teen, before joining Montmorency in the Northern Football League, including at senior level in 2023. Sims attended high school at Parade College in the northern suburbs of Melbourne and played in the school's Herald Sun Shield premiership winning side in 2024.

Sims played representative grade football for the Northern Knights in the Talent League beginning in 2023. In 2024 he kicked a league-best five goals in the opening round of the season and later had a seven-goal haul in a match against the Oakleigh Chargers. He finished the year with 23 goals from 15 matches.

In 2024, Sims represented the Victoria Metropolitan region at the 2024 AFL Under 18 Championships, averaging 8.5 disposals, 4.5 marks and one goal per game in his four appearances in what was an undefeated championship winning run for his side.

== AFL career ==
Sims was drafted by Richmond with the club's seventh pick and the 28th selection overall in the 2024 AFL draft!

He made his first appearance for the club in limited minutes in a pre-season AFL match against Collingwood in late-February 2025. He spent the next two months playing at reserves level for the club, appearing in five VFL matches and kicking five goals. Sims made his AFL debut in round 9, 2025, in a match against West Coast at the MCG.

== Player profile ==
Sims plays as a tall forward and a relief ruck. He is notable for his leap and agility for a player of his size.

== Statistics ==
Updated to the end of the 2025 season.

Legend
G	Goals	K	Kicks	D	Disposals	T	Tackles
B	Behinds	H	Handballs	M	Marks

Season	Team	No.	Games	Totals							Averages (per game)							Votes
Season	Team	No.	Games	G	B	K	H	D	M	T	G	B	K	H	D	M	T	Votes
2025	Richmond	38	11	4	4	42	33	75	24	22	0.4	0.4	3.8	3.0	6.8	2.2	2.0	0
Career			11	4	4	42	33	75	24	22	0.4	0.4	3.8	3.0	6.8	2.2	2.0	0
