= Taj Hotton =

Australian rules footballer (born 2006)

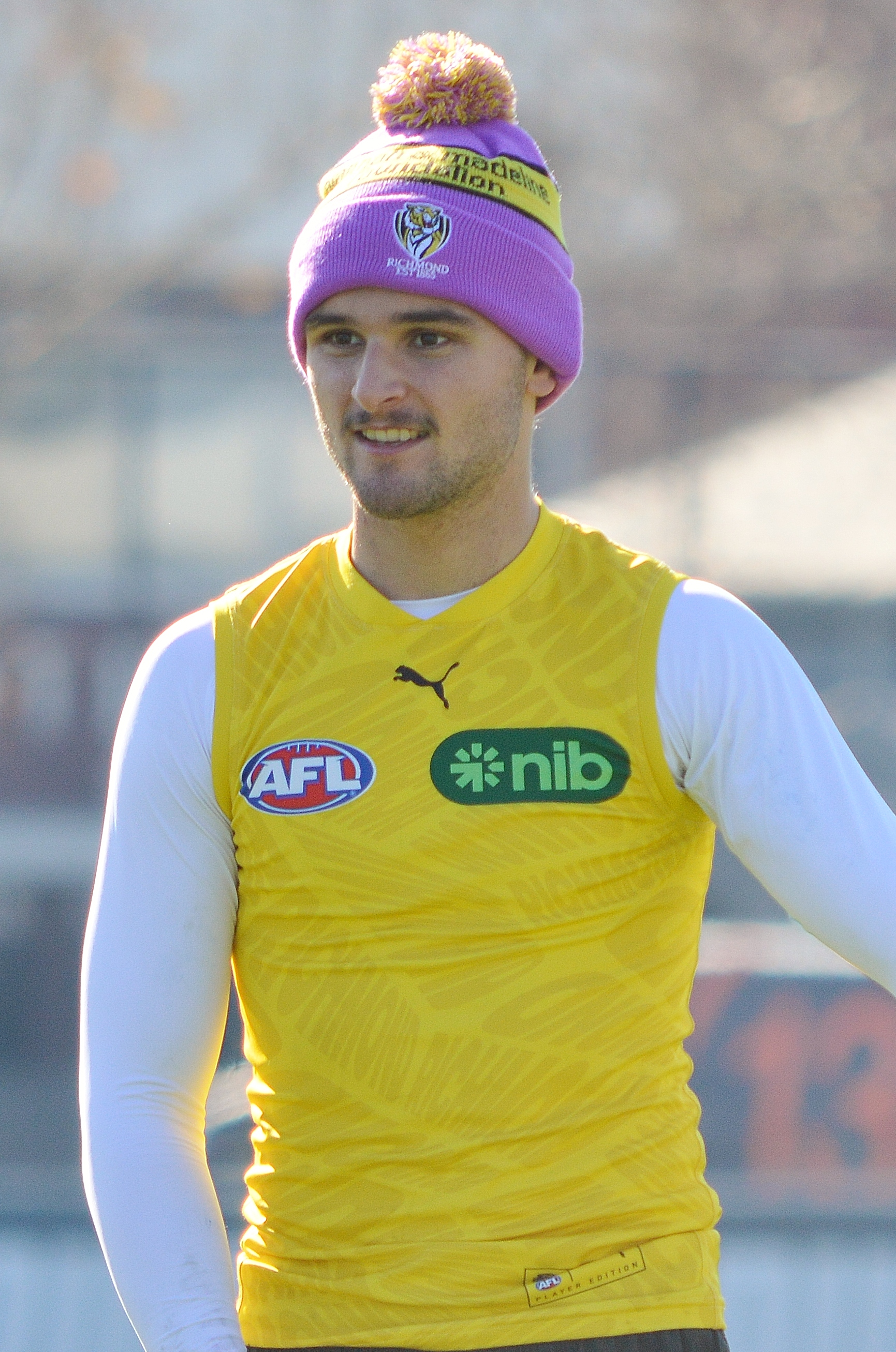
- Hotton in August 2026

Personal information
- Born: 17 June 2006 (age 20)
- Original teams: Sandringham Dragons (Talent League); Hampton Rovers (SMJFL)
- Draft: No. 12, 2024 AFL draft
- Debut: Round 18, 2025, Richmond vs. Essendon, at MCG
- Height: 183 cm (6 ft 0 in)
- Position: Forward/Midfielder

Club information
- Current club: Richmond
- Number: 10

Playing career^{1}
Years	Club	Games (Goals)
2025–	Richmond	17 (4)
- ^{1} Playing statistics correct to the end of 2026.

Taj Hotton (born 17 June 2006) is an Australian rules footballer who plays for the Richmond Football Club in the Australian Football League (AFL). A dynamic forward and midfielder, Hotton was drafted in the first round of the 2024 AFL draft and made his debut late in the 2025 season.

== Early life and junior football ==
Hotton was raised in Melbourne's bayside south eastern suburbs and played junior football with Hampton Rovers Football Club in the South Metro Junior Football League. He grew up supporting Carlton.

In 2023 Hotton made his top-level junior representative debut for the Sandringham Dragons in the Talent League. He played seven matches across the season, kicking six goals and averaging 11 disposals per game. That same year he earned selection to represent the Victoria Metropolitan region at the 2023 AFL Under 18 Championships, one of a select group to do so a year before their final junior season. He also won an Associated Public Schools of Victoria football championship with Haileybury College in 2023, where he attended for high school studies.

Hotton started his final year of junior football in strong form, named best afield by the Herald Sun with 27 disposals and three goals in each of the opening two rounds of Haileybury's APS season. He recorded 32 disposals, 10 marks and kicked four goals in a Talent League game against the Oakleigh Chargers around the same time, which earned him a late call up to the AFL Academy's showcase exhibition game against VFL side Coburg in April. Hotton again made a stand-out contribution in that game, kicking two goals along with 18 disposals. In the first week of May, Hotton was named among the players to represent Victoria Metro at the 2024 AFL Under 18 Championships. Soon after however, he suffered an ACL tear in his knee while training with Haileybury, ruling him out for the remainder of the season. He acted as an assistant midfield coach during Sandringham's premiership win later that year.

== AFL career ==
Hotton was drafted by Richmond with the club's third selection and the 12th pick overall in the 2024 AFL draft.

He spent the early months of his season continuing rehabilitation for the knee injury he suffered the previous year. He returned to competitive football with limited match time with the club's reserves side in the VFL in June. After a further two matches on limited minutes in the reserves including a 24 disposal and one goal game, Hotton was selected to make his AFL debut in a round 18 win over Essendon at the MCG where he kicked one goal and recorded 10 disposals.

== Player profile ==
Hotton plays as a forward and midfielder. Prior to his draft selection, Hotton's playing style was compared to Harry Sheezel and Shai Bolton by ESPN and Fox Footy, respectively.

== Personal life ==
His father Trent Hotton played 17 matches with Collingwood between 1994 and 1996 and 61 games with Carlton between 2000 and 2002. His older brother Olli Hotton was drafted by St Kilda with the 35th overall pick in 2022 and was de-listed by the club at the end of 2024 without having made an AFL debut.

== Statistics ==
Updated to the end of round 22, 2026.

Legend
G	Goals	K	Kicks	D	Disposals	T	Tackles
B	Behinds	H	Handballs	M	Marks

Season	Team	No.	Games	Totals							Averages (per game)							Votes
Season	Team	No.	Games	G	B	K	H	D	M	T	G	B	K	H	D	M	T	Votes
2025	Richmond	24	7	3	2	31	58	89	22	16	0.4	0.3	4.4	8.3	12.7	3.1	2.3	0
2026	Richmond	10	8	1	3	32	65	97	13	32	0.1	0.4	4.0	8.1	12.1	1.6	4.0	0
Career			15	4	5	63	123	186	35	48	0.3	0.3	4.2	8.2	12.4	2.3	3.2	0
