= Tarryn Thomas =

Australian rules football player

Personal information
- Born: 25 March 2000 (age 26); Sydney, New South Wales
- Original team: North Launceston (TSL)/Prospect Hawks (Tas)
- Draft: No. 8, 2018 national draft
- Debut: Round 2, 2019, North Melbourne vs. Brisbane Lions, at Marvel Stadium
- Height: 190 cm (6 ft 3 in)
- Weight: 83 kg (183 lb)
- Position: Midfielder

Playing career^{1}
Years	Club	Games (Goals)
2019–2023	North Melbourne	69 (56)
- ^{1} Playing statistics correct to the end of 2023.

Career highlights
- 2019 AFL Rising Star nominee

Tarryn Thomas (born Tarryn Trindall, 25 March 2000) is a former professional Australian rules footballer who played for the North Melbourne Football Club in the Australian Football League (AFL).

== Early life ==
Thomas was born as Tarryn Trindall in Sydney, New South Wales, into a family of Indigenous Australian descent (Kamilaroi and Lumaranatana). He grew up playing rugby league and was identified as a junior prospect in the position of fullback, which subsequently led to him joining the Penrith Panthers development academy. At 12 years of age, Thomas relocated to Launceston, Tasmania, and began playing Australian rules football for the Prospect Hawks and eventually the North Launceston Bombers.

He made history in 2016 when he was voted Tasmania's best under-16 and under-18 player at respective national championships in the same year. Thomas was drafted by North Melbourne with their first selection and eighth overall in the 2018 national draft, after being part of North's Next Generation Academy (NGA). He completed school at St Patrick's College, Launceston.

== AFL career ==
Thomas made his debut as a late inclusion in North Melbourne's 21-point loss to the Brisbane Lions at Marvel Stadium in round 2, 2019. Thomas received a 2019 AFL Rising Star nomination for his two-goal effort in round 12 against Gold Coast. Thomas had a career-best game in round 19 of the 2021 AFL season, where he kicked 4 goals and played a major part in the team's upset win over Carlton.

=== Legal issues and AFL suspension ===
In 2023, Thomas was charged with threatening to distribute an intimate image; he was later stood down by the club; he was offered a diversion programme, and Thomas was ordered to pay $1,000 to charity. The charge was Thomas's second over the 2022–23 AFL off-season after he was previously caught driving while his licence was suspended. Additionally, in a now-deleted Instagram video posted by Thomas, he appeared to have his feet up on a Mercedes dashboard while driving.

At the start of 2024, Thomas was found to have engaged in inappropriate behaviour towards a woman, which followed a long list of off-field controversies and indiscretions. He received an 18-game suspension from the AFL, which was subsequently followed by North Melbourne’s decision to sever ties with Thomas ahead of the 2024 AFL season.

In May 2024, Essendon coach Brad Scott said in a televised press interview that Thomas was a "good person" and "deserved a second chance". The comment was slammed by the public at large and by media personalities such as former AFL champion Jimmy Bartel, himself a staunch campaigner against domestic violence.

Prior to the start of the 2025 VFL season, the Northern Bullants expressed interest in signing Thomas. Following criticism on social media and amid the threat of losing sponsors and members, the club's board ultimately chose not to proceed with signing Thomas after a meeting held on 23 February 2025.

In May 2025, Thomas was arrested in Melbourne for possession of a drug of dependence.

== Statistics ==
Statistics are correct to the end of the 2022 season.

Legend
G	Goals	K	Kicks	D	Disposals	T	Tackles
B	Behinds	H	Handballs	M	Marks

Season	Team	No.	Games	Totals							Averages (per game)						
Season	Team	No.	Games	G	B	K	H	D	M	T	G	B	K	H	D	M	T
2019	North Melbourne	26	20	16	15	114	126	240	47	68	0.8	0.8	5.7	6.3	12.0	2.4	3.4
2020 (Note: The 2020 season was played with 17 home-and-away matches per team (down from 22) and 16-minute quarters with time on (down from 20-minute quarters with time on) due to the impact of the COVID-19 pandemic.)	North Melbourne	26	6	3	2	24	23	47	8	19	0.3	0.3	4.0	3.8	7.8	1.3	3.2
2021	North Melbourne	26	21	24	17	233	149	382	96	73	1.2	0.9	10.9	6.7	17.6	3.3	3.7
2022	North Melbourne	26	10	2	2	84	45	129	28	28	0.2	0.2	8.4	4.5	12.9	2.8	2.8
Career			57	45	36	455	343	798	179	187	0.7	0.6	7.9	6.0	14.0	3.1	3.2
