= Jacob Koschitzke =

Australian rules footballer (born 2000)

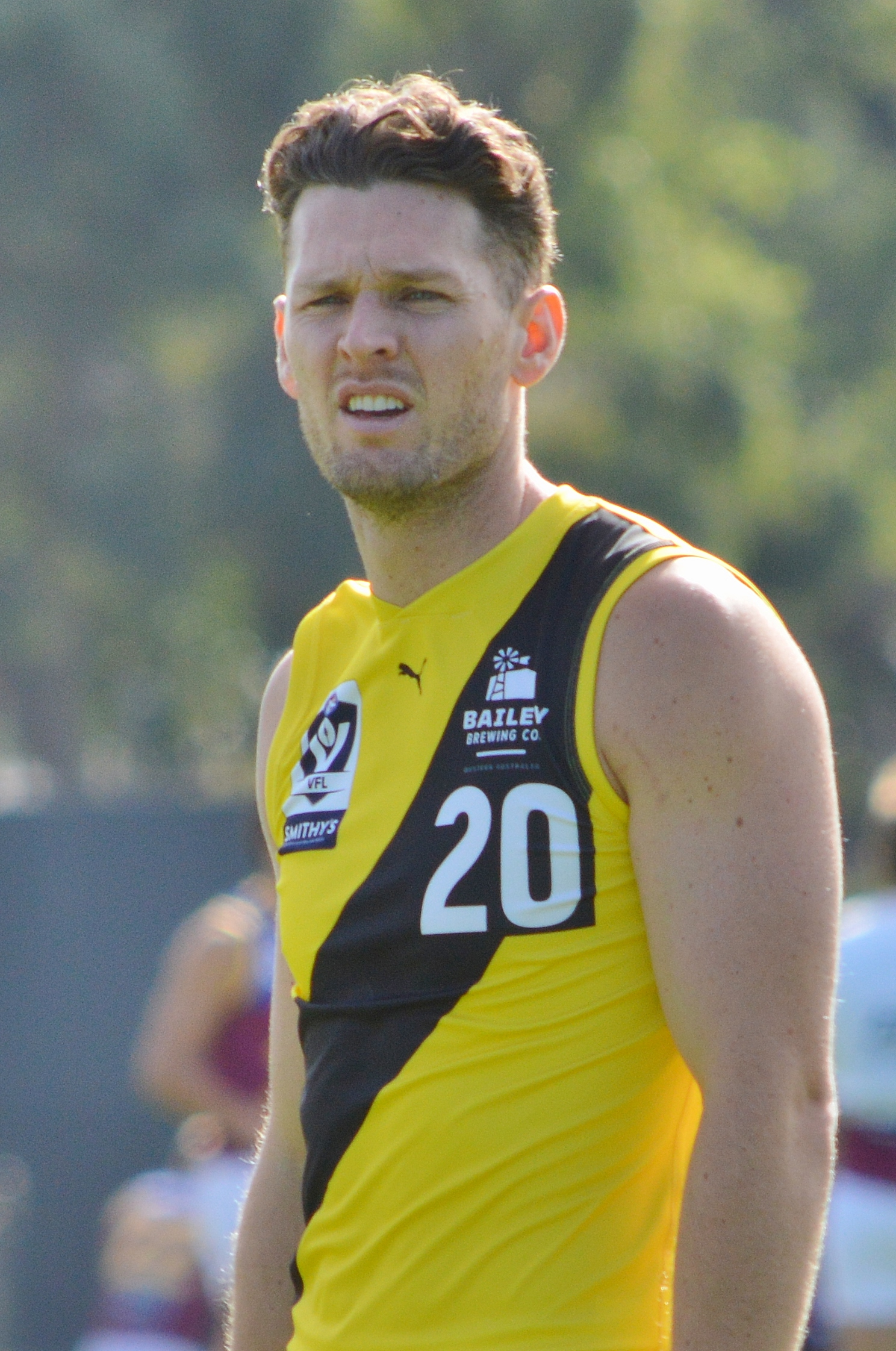
- Koschitzke in April 2025

Personal information
- Full name: Jacob Koschitzke
- Born: 11 July 2000 (age 26); Albury, New South Wales
- Original teams: Albury (OMFNL); Murray Bushrangers (TAC Cup)
- Draft: No. 52, 2018 national draft
- Debut: Round 1, 2021, Hawthorn vs. Essendon, at Marvel Stadium
- Height: 198 cm (6 ft 6 in)
- Weight: 96 kg (212 lb)
- Position: Key Forward

Playing career
Years	Club	Games (Goals)
2019–2023	Hawthorn	48 (54)
2024–2025	Richmond	16 (12)
Total		64 (66)

Jacob Koschitzke (/kəˈzɪtskiː/ kə-ZIT-skee; born 11 July 2000) is a former professional Australian rules footballer who played for Hawthorn and Richmond in the Australian Football League (AFL).

== Early career ==
Jacob Koschitzke was born and raised in the New South Wales regional town of Albury and is the cousin of former St Kilda forward Justin Koschitzke. He was a part of the Greater Western Sydney Giants' developmental academy until 2016, when Albury was removed from their zone.

Standing at 196cm tall, the youngster was used as swingman from the Murray Bushrangers, and was rated among the best key position prospects in the 2018 draft. He had an impressive national U18 championships for the Allies which resulted in an All-Australian selection in the position of fullback.

Koschitzke was drafted with selection Pick 52 in the 2018 AFL draft by Hawthorn.

== AFL career ==
=== Hawthorn ===
Jacob Koschitzke began his AFL career with the Box Hill Hawks, an affiliate of the Hawthorn Football Club. In his first season, he developed under Hawthorn-aligned coaching staff while adapting to the physical and tactical demands of AFL football. He has played as a key position player, contributing in marking contests and defensive transition play.

Koschitzke had to negotiate a difficult COVID-19 affected season. He showed promise during the pre-season games and with scratch matches against other AFL clubs. Later in the year he was moved to the forward line and seemed to thrived. A big pre-season in 2021 and a dominant game at full forward against North Melbourne in which he kicked six goals showed that he was ready for the big time.

Koschitzke played his first AFL game for Hawthorn as part of the trio that debuted in the opening round of the 2021 AFL season against Essendon at Marvel Stadium.

Koschitzke played 48 games over 5 seasons for Hawthorn, he requested and was traded to Richmond at the end of the 2023 AFL season.

=== Richmond ===
Koschitzke played 16 games for Richmond over two seasons, before he was delisted at the end of the 2025 season.

== Statistics ==
Legend
G	Goals	K	Kicks	D	Disposals	T	Tackles
B	Behinds	H	Handballs	M	Marks

Season	Team	No.	Games	Totals							Averages (per game)							Votes
Season	Team	No.	Games	G	B	K	H	D	M	T	G	B	K	H	D	M	T	Votes
2019	Hawthorn	34	0	—	—	—	—	—	—	—	—	—	—	—	—	—	—	0
2020 (Note: The 2020 season was played with 17 home-and-away matches per team (down from 22) and 16-minute quarters with time on (down from 20-minute quarters with time on) due to the impact of the COVID-19 pandemic.)	Hawthorn	34	0	—	—	—	—	—	—	—	—	—	—	—	—	—	—	0
2021	Hawthorn	34	20	27	19	98	65	163	77	37	1.4	1.0	4.9	3.3	8.2	3.9	1.9	3
2022	Hawthorn	23	16	18	8	81	44	125	36	41	1.1	0.5	5.1	2.8	7.8	2.3	2.6	0
2023	Hawthorn	23	12	9	10	56	47	103	39	27	0.8	0.8	4.7	3.9	8.6	3.3	2.3	0
2024	Richmond	20	14	12	6	65	63	128	45	17	0.9	0.4	4.6	4.5	9.1	3.2	1.2	0
2025	Richmond	20	2	0	2	6	9	15	6	1	0.0	1.0	3.0	4.5	7.5	3.0	0.5	0
Career			64	66	45	306	228	534	203	123	1.0	0.7	4.8	3.6	8.3	3.2	1.9	3

== Honours and achievements ==
Individual

- AFL Rising Star nominee: 2021
- Hawthorn best first year player (debut season): 2021
- Under 18 All-Australian team: 2018
