= Seth Campbell =

Australian rules footballer (born 2004)

- Campbell in 2026

Personal information
- Born: 29 December 2004 (age 21)
- Original team: North Launceston (TSL)
- Draft: No. 12, 2022 rookie draft
- Debut: Opening Round, 2024, Richmond vs. Gold Coast, at Carrara Stadium
- Height: 182 cm (6 ft 0 in)
- Weight: 73 kg (161 lb)
- Position: Forward

Club information
- Current club: Richmond
- Number: 44

Playing career^{1}
Years	Club	Games (Goals)
2023–	Richmond	66 (56)
- ^{1} Playing statistics correct to the end of 2026.

Career highlights
- Richmond leading goalkicker: 2025

Seth Campbell (born 29 December 2004) is a professional Australian rules footballer who plays for the Richmond Football Club in the Australian Football League (AFL). A dangerous small forward, Campbell became a regular member of the Richmond AFL side in 2024 after being drafted to the club in 2022.

== Early life and junior football ==
Campbell was raised in the north-western Tasmanian town of Burnie. He took up football at under 12s level with the Burnie Dockers and went on to play with the club's senior side in 2021. In the same year he played representative under 18 football for the Tasmania Devils in the NAB League and for his state at the AFL Under 17 Championships.

Campbell joined North Launceston in the Tasmanian Football League in 2022, the premier adult men's competition in the state. He scored a 10-goal haul in his third senior game for the club, as part of a 122-victory over North Hobart in mid-August. During the same year he once again played representative under 18 football for the Tasmania Devils in the NAB League, where he kicked 16 goals over 13 matches, including three goals in a win over the NT Thunder in May Campbell also played with the Allies side at the 2022 AFL Under 18 Championships alongside fellow Tasmanian juniors and those from the Australian Capital Territory, New South Wales, Northern Territory and Queensland. He played three matches at the tournament, including a game against South Australia where he recorded 15 disposals and kicked two goals.

== AFL career ==
=== 2023 season ===
Campbell was drafted by Richmond with the club's first selection and 12th pick overall in the 2022 rookie draft, after being overlooked through all rounds of the National Draft earlier that week.

He had an interrupted lead in to his first year at Richmond, hampered by overloading of his adductor muscles through the end of March. The same groin stress would recur later that year and keep him from featuring in matches through mid-July. At season's end, Campbell had failed to make an AFL debut and had played just five matches in the club's reserves side.

=== 2024 season ===
Campbell made his AFL debut in opening round of the 2024 season. Campbell kicked 2 goals from his 9 disposals on debut in the loss to Gold Coast. In a 2024 season in which Richmond finished last on the ladder, Campbell played 21 games for the year and was awarded with Richmond's Bill Cosgrove/Harry Jenkins Best First Year Player award.

=== 2025 season ===
In round 1, 2025, Campbell sealed the victory against Carlton with a goal following which he celebrated with a backflip. Two weeks later, Campbell backed up his good form with a career-high three goals against St Kilda. He placed fifth in the club's best and fairest award and won the club leading goalkicker award that year.

== Player profile ==
Campbell plays as a forward and is notable for his endurance running and his decision-making.

== Statistics ==
Updated to the end of round 22, 2026.

Legend
G	Goals	K	Kicks	D	Disposals	T	Tackles
B	Behinds	H	Handballs	M	Marks

Season	Team	No.	Games	Totals							Averages (per game)							Votes
Season	Team	No.	Games	G	B	K	H	D	M	T	G	B	K	H	D	M	T	Votes
2023	Richmond	44	0	—	—	—	—	—	—	—	—	—	—	—	—	—	—	0
2024	Richmond	44	21	10	14	151	87	238	61	45	0.5	0.7	7.2	4.1	11.3	2.9	2.1	0
2025	Richmond	44	22	28	17	158	126	284	56	56	1.3	0.8	7.2	5.7	12.9	2.5	2.5	0
2026	Richmond	44	21	17	15	198	124	322	59	43	0.8	0.7	9.4	5.9	15.3	2.8	2.0	0
Career			64	55	46	507	337	844	176	144	0.9	0.7	7.9	5.3	13.2	2.8	2.3	0
