= Jacob Blight =

Australian footballer

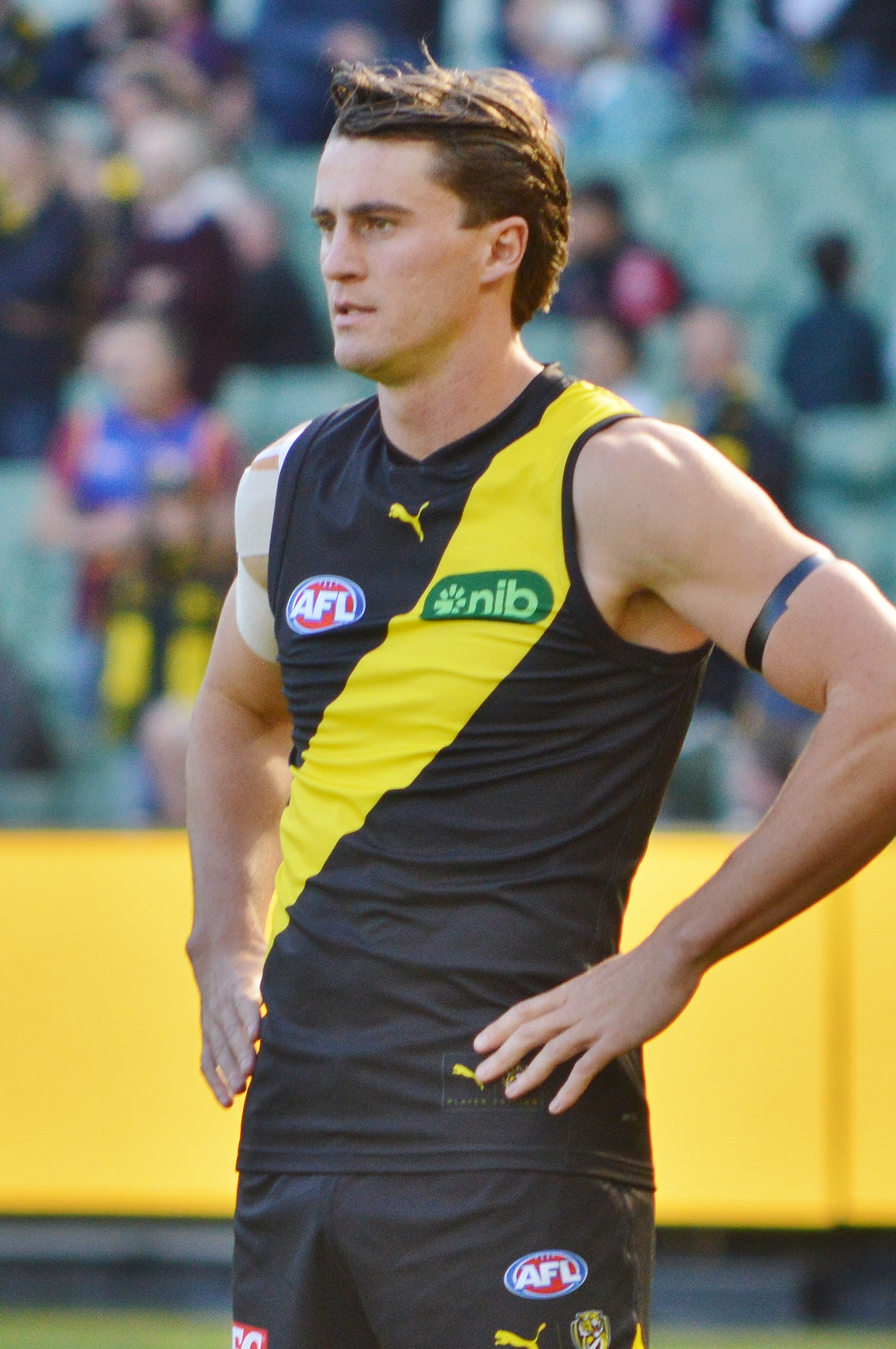
- Blight in April 2025

Personal information
- Full name: Jacob Ashley Blight
- Born: 14 December 2001 (age 24)
- Original team: Peel Thunder (WAFL)
- Draft: No. 2, 2024 mid-season draft
- Debut: Round 16, 2024, Richmond vs. Carlton, at MCG
- Height: 196 cm (6 ft 5 in)
- Position: Key defender

Playing career
Years	Club	Games (Goals)
2024–2025	Richmond	10 (3)

Jacob Ashley Blight (born 14 December 2001) is a former professional Australian rules footballer who played for the Richmond Football Club in the Australian Football League (AFL). He was drafted by Richmond with the 2nd selection overall in the 2024 mid-season rookie draft.

Originally from Gnowangerup, Western Australia, he had previously played for Claremont and Peel Thunder in the West Australian Football League. Blight made his AFL debut in round 16 of the 2024 season.

Blight was delisted at the end of the 2025 AFL season, after 10 games across a year and a half at Richmond.

== Statistics ==
Legend
G	Goals	K	Kicks	D	Disposals	T	Tackles
B	Behinds	H	Handballs	M	Marks

Season	Team	No.	Games	Totals							Averages (per game)							Votes
Season	Team	No.	Games	G	B	K	H	D	M	T	G	B	K	H	D	M	T	Votes
2024	Richmond	51	3	0	0	23	13	36	15	6	0.0	0.0	7.7	4.3	12.0	5.0	2.0	0
2025	Richmond	46	7	3	1	53	29	82	42	7	0.4	0.1	7.6	4.1	11.7	6.0	1.0	0
Career			10	3	1	76	42	118	57	13	0.3	0.1	7.6	4.2	11.8	5.7	1.3	0
