= Steely Green =

Australian footballer

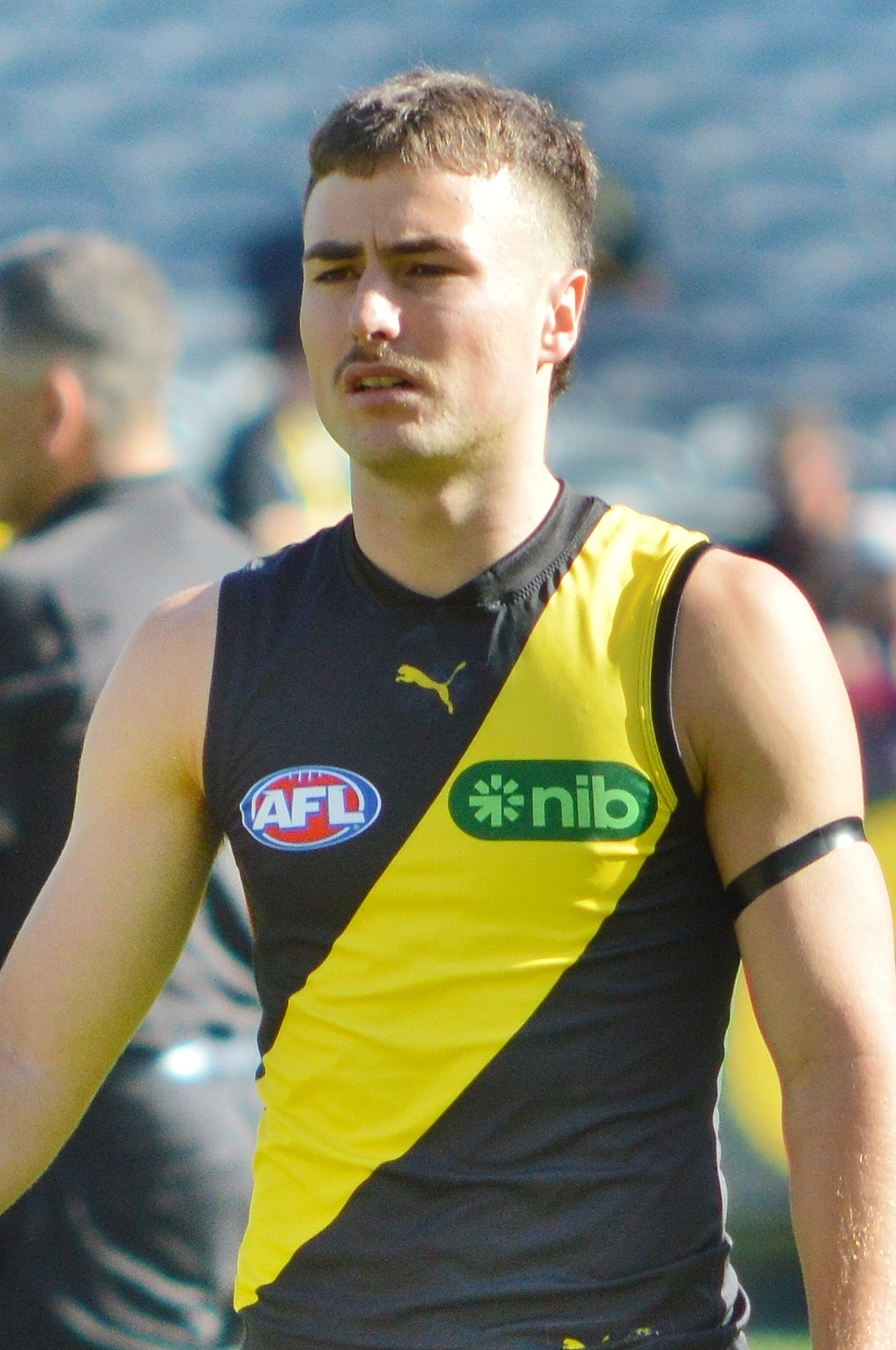
- Green in April 2025

Personal information
- Born: 9 January 2004 (age 22)
- Original team: South Fremantle (WAFL)
- Draft: No. 55, 2022 AFL draft
- Debut: Round 11, 2024, Richmond vs. Brisbane Lions, at The Gabba
- Height: 179 cm (5 ft 10 in)
- Position: Small forward

Club information
- Current club: Richmond
- Number: 48

Playing career^{1}
Years	Club	Games (Goals)
2023–2026	Richmond	45 (32)
- ^{1} Playing statistics correct to the end of 2026.

Steely Green (born 9 January 2004) is an Australian rules footballer who last played for the Richmond Football Club in the Australian Football League (AFL). He was drafted by Richmond with the 55th overall selection in the 2022 AFL draft. Green made his debut in round 10 of the 2024 season, against the Brisbane Lions at the Gabba.

== Statistics ==
Updated to the end of round 22, 2026.

Legend
G	Goals	K	Kicks	D	Disposals	T	Tackles
B	Behinds	H	Handballs	M	Marks

Season	Team	No.	Games	Totals							Averages (per game)							Votes
Season	Team	No.	Games	G	B	K	H	D	M	T	G	B	K	H	D	M	T	Votes
2024	Richmond	48	6	5	1	34	18	52	14	6	0.8	0.2	5.7	3.0	8.7	2.3	1.0	0
2025	Richmond	48	19	11	9	84	56	140	33	34	0.6	0.5	4.4	2.9	7.4	1.7	1.8	0
2026	Richmond	48	18	14	10	121	76	197	53	42	0.8	0.6	6.7	4.2	10.9	2.9	2.3	0
Career			43	30	20	239	150	389	100	82	0.7	0.5	5.6	3.5	9.0	2.3	1.9	0
