= Matt Coulthard =

Australian rules footballer

Personal information
- Full name: Matthew Coulthard
- Born: 11 May 2001 (age 25)
- Original team: Glenelg (SANFL)
- Draft: No. 4, 2023 mid-season rookie draft
- Debut: round 19, 2023, Richmond vs. Hawthorn, at MCG
- Height: 176 cm (5 ft 9 in)
- Weight: 76 kg (168 lb)
- Position: Small forward

Playing career
Years	Club	Games (Goals)
2023–2024	Richmond	6 (2)

Matthew Coulthard (born 11 May 2001) is a former professional Australian rules footballer who played for the Richmond Football Club in the Australian Football League (AFL). He was drafted by Richmond in the 2023 mid-season draft and made his AFL debut in round 19 of the 2023 season.

== Early life, junior and state-league football ==
Coulthard played junior football at Port Noarlunga in the junior ranks of the Adelaide suburban Southern Football League. In his late teenage years he played representative football for the junior side of South Adelaide Football Club, as well as five reserves grade matches in 2021. He continued to play SFL football with Port Noarlunga in 2022, before suffering a season-ending ankle injury after just three matches.

He began the 2023 season playing second-grade football with the Glenelg reserves, and later senior-level SANFL football with the same club. During the year he also made one appearance for the Happy Valley Football Club in the SFL. Prior to the mid-season AFL draft, Coulthard had played three senior matches for Glenelg.

== AFL career ==
=== 2023 season ===
Coulthard was drafted by Richmond with the club's first pick and the fourth selection overall in the 2023 mid-season draft.

After six weeks with the club's reserves team in the VFL, Coulthard made his AFL debut in a round 19 win over Hawthorn at the MCG MCG. He got delisted as well as Noah Cumberland on the 23rd of October 2024. He did so as the starting substitute, recording seven disposals in just 30 per cent game time. He finished the year having played four matches at AFL level.

== Statistics ==
Legend
G	Goals	K	Kicks	D	Disposals	T	Tackles
B	Behinds	H	Handballs	M	Marks

Season	Team	No.	Games	Totals							Averages (per game)							Votes
Season	Team	No.	Games	G	B	K	H	D	M	T	G	B	K	H	D	M	T	Votes
2023	Richmond	26	4	1	2	18	11	29	7	6	0.3	0.5	4.5	2.8	7.3	1.8	1.5	0
2024	Richmond	26	2	1	0	3	3	6	0	0	0.5	0.0	1.5	1.5	3.0	0.0	0.0	0
Career			6	2	2	21	14	35	7	6	0.3	0.3	3.5	2.3	5.8	1.2	1.0	0
