= James Trezise =

Professional Australian rules footballer

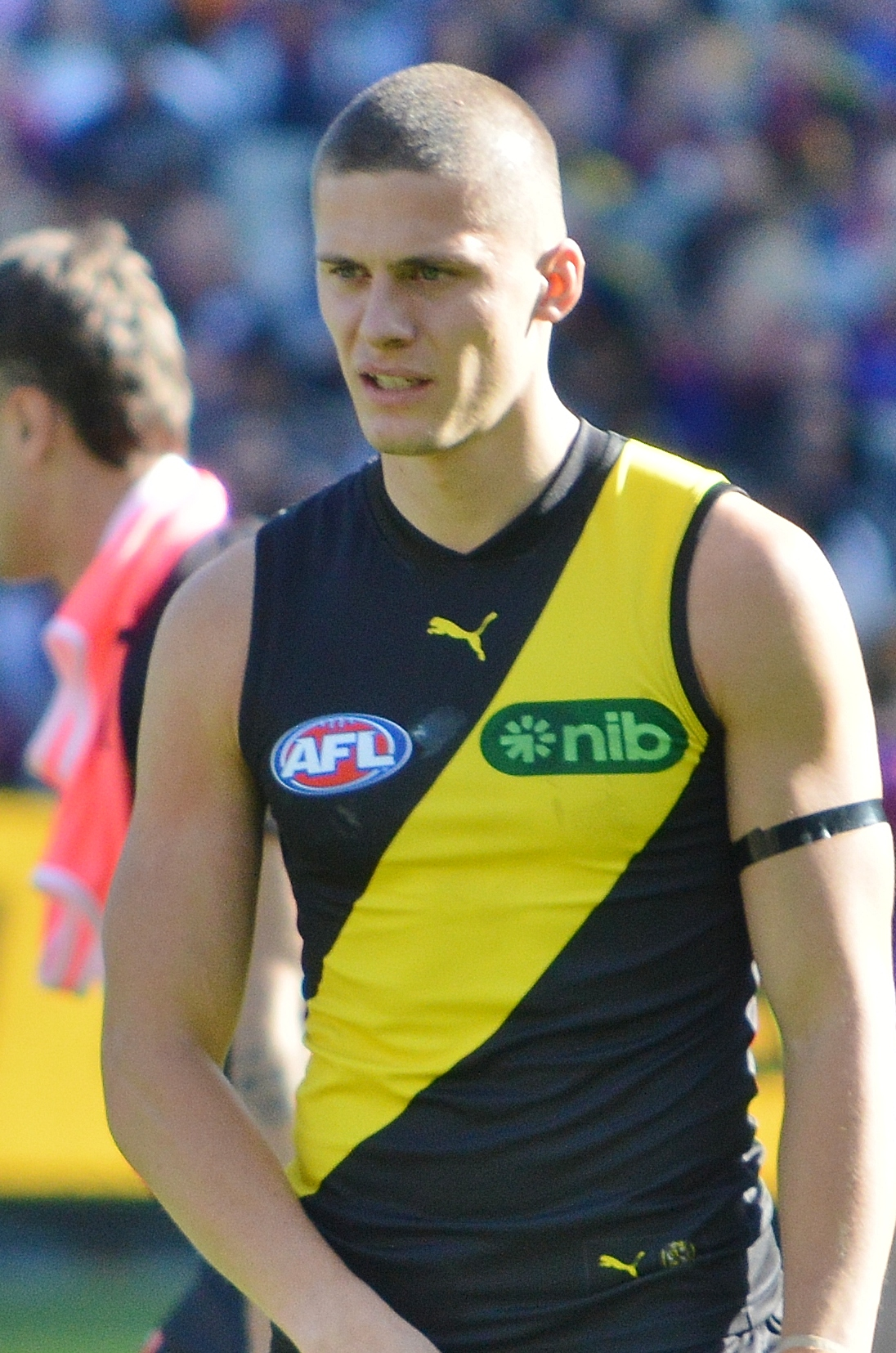
- Trezise in April 2025

Personal information
- Full name: James Trezise
- Nicknames: Trigger, Nipper
- Born: 15 June 2002 (age 24)
- Original team: Tooradin Dalmore (West Gippsland)
- Draft: No. 13, 2023 AFL mid-season rookie draft
- Debut: Round 24, 2023, Richmond vs. Port Adelaide, at Adelaide Oval
- Height: 188 cm (6 ft 2 in)
- Weight: 76 kg (168 lb)
- Position: Medium defender

Playing career^{1}
Years	Club	Games (Goals)
2023–2026	Richmond	38 (4)
- ^{1} Playing statistics correct to the end of 2026.

James Trezise (born 15 June 2002) is a professional Australian rules footballer who most recently played for the Richmond Football Club in the Australian Football League (AFL). He was drafted by Richmond in the 2023 mid-season draft and made his AFL debut in round 24 of the 2023 season.

== Early life, junior, country and state-league football ==
Trezise was raised in the outer south-east of Melbourne, playing junior football in Berwick and schooling at Casey Grammar School and St. Francis Xavier College. In he joined Tooradin-Dalmore in the West Gippsland Football Netball Competition, where he remained through the club's premiership winning 2022 season, playing as a goal-scoring half-forward. The following year he joined the Richmond reserves program as an exclusively VFL-listed player. During the early months of the 2023 VFL season he impressed scouts from multiple AFL clubs while playing predominately as a half-back.

== AFL career ==
=== 2023 season ===
Trezise was selected 13th overall by the Richmond Football Club in the 2023 AFL mid-season rookie draft. He continued to play VFL football with the club over the months that followed, before being selected for his AFL debut in the final round of the 2023 season. In that round 24 loss to Port Adelaide at Adelaide Oval he recorded 17 disposals.

== Player profile ==
Trezise plays primarily as a rebounding half-back with impressive speed and acceleration.

== Statistics ==
Updated to the end of round 22, 2026.

Legend
G	Goals	K	Kicks	D	Disposals	T	Tackles
B	Behinds	H	Handballs	M	Marks

Season	Team	No.	Games	Totals							Averages (per game)							Votes
Season	Team	No.	Games	G	B	K	H	D	M	T	G	B	K	H	D	M	T	Votes
2023	Richmond	36	1	0	0	13	4	17	3	5	0.0	0.0	13.0	4.0	17.0	3.0	5.0	0
2024	Richmond	36	7	0	0	54	42	96	27	9	0.0	0.0	7.7	6.0	13.7	3.9	1.3	0
2025	Richmond	36	16	3	3	91	116	207	41	27	0.2	0.2	5.7	7.3	12.9	2.6	1.7	0
2026	Richmond	36	14	1	2	110	115	225	65	37	0.1	0.1	7.9	8.2	16.1	4.6	2.6	0
Career			38	4	5	268	277	545	136	78	0.1	0.1	7.1	7.3	14.3	3.6	2.1	0
