= Kaleb Smith =

Australian footballer (born 2004)

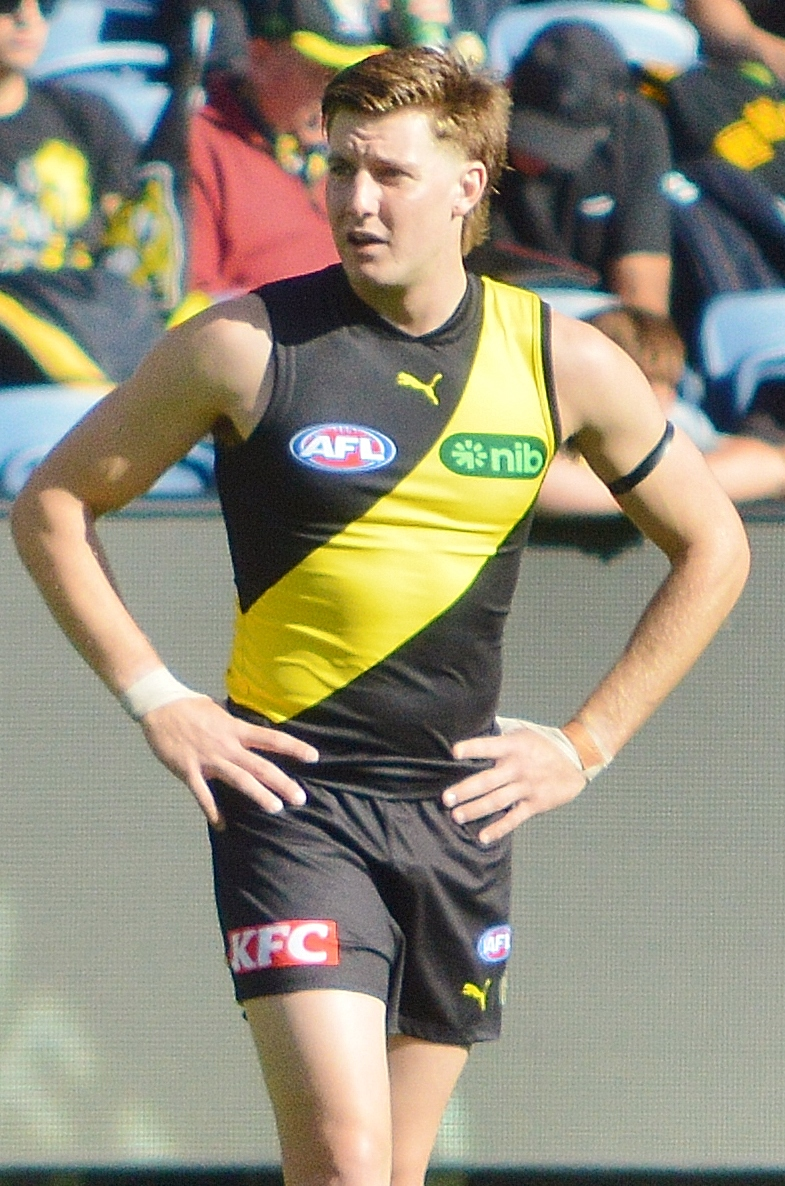
- Smith in April 2025

Personal information
- Born: 20 November 2004 (age 21)
- Original team: East Fremantle (WAFL)
- Draft: No. 49, 2022 AFL draft
- Debut: Round 12, 2024, Richmond vs. Geelong, at Kardinia Park
- Height: 181 cm (5 ft 11 in)
- Position: Defender

Playing career^{1}
Years	Club	Games (Goals)
2023–2026	Richmond	12 (1)
- ^{1} Playing statistics correct to the end of 2026.

Kaleb Smith (born 20 November 2004) is an Australian rules footballer who last played for the Richmond Football Club in the Australian Football League (AFL). He drafted by Richmond with the 49th selection overall in the 2022 AFL draft. Smith made his debut in round 12 of the 2024 season.

== Statistics ==
Updated to the end of the 2025 season.

Legend
G	Goals	K	Kicks	D	Disposals	T	Tackles
B	Behinds	H	Handballs	M	Marks

Season	Team	No.	Games	Totals							Averages (per game)							Votes
Season	Team	No.	Games	G	B	K	H	D	M	T	G	B	K	H	D	M	T	Votes
2024	Richmond	49	4	1	0	19	7	26	9	1	0.3	0.0	4.8	1.8	6.5	2.3	0.3	0
2025	Richmond	49	8	0	0	58	31	89	29	7	0.0	0.0	7.3	3.9	11.1	3.6	0.9	0
Career			12	1	0	77	38	115	38	8	0.1	0.0	6.4	3.2	9.6	3.2	0.7	0
