= Hugo Ralphsmith =

Australian rules football player

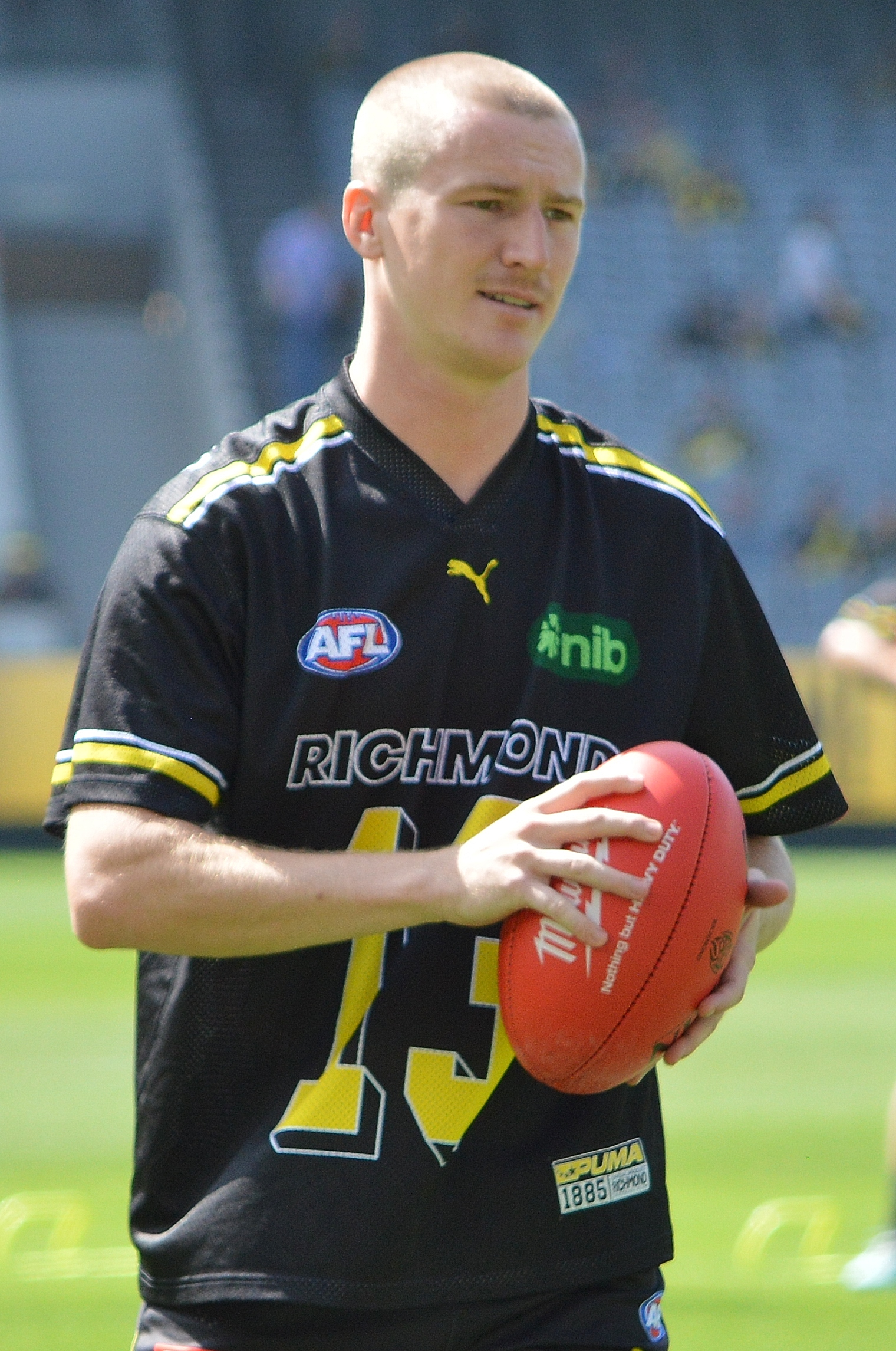
- Ralphsmith in March 2026

Personal information
- Born: 9 November 2001 (age 24)
- Original team: Sandringham Dragons (NAB League Boys)
- Draft: No. 46, 2019 AFL draft
- Debut: Round 9, 2021, Richmond vs. Greater Western Sydney, at Marvel Stadium
- Height: 188 cm (6 ft 2 in)
- Weight: 83 kg (183 lb)
- Position: Wing / Half-forward

Club information
- Current club: Richmond
- Number: 13

Playing career^{1}
Years	Club	Games (Goals)
2020–	Richmond	75 (27)
- ^{1} Playing statistics correct to the end of 23, 2026.

Career highlights
- AFL Rising Star nominee: 2022

Hugo Ralphsmith (born 9 November 2001) is a professional Australian rules footballer who plays for the Richmond Football Club in the Australian Football League (AFL).

== Early life and junior football ==
Ralphsmith was raised in the bayside suburbs of Melbourne and played junior football with the East Brighton Football Club in the South Metro Junior Football League. He attended high school and played school football at Haileybury College.

Ralphsmith earned selection in the local NAB League Boys representative side the Sandringham Dragons as a 16 year old in 2018. The same year, Ralphsmith was chosen to represent the Victorian metropolitan side at a special series of Under 17s exhibition matches against other states, including as one of his side's best players in a win over New South Wales. At the end of the year, Ralphsmith was among 48 players in the country chosen to play in a special Under 17s exhibition match on the MCG ahead of that year's AFL Grand Final.

Ralphsmith joined the AFL Academy's specialised training program ahead of his final year of underage football, after being identified as a potential AFL draftee. He resumed representative football with Sandringham that year and was named a member of the club's official six-player leadership group. Mid-way through the season, Ralphsmith was selected to the squad for the Victorian Metropolitan side at the 2019 AFL Under 18 Championships. He played in each of the series' first three matches, but was omitted from Metro's final match of the series, finishing the tournament with two goals from three matches. Ralphsmith featured in NAB League matches over the second half of the season including being named in the Aussie Rules Draft Central team of the weeks in round 12 and 13. He injured his shoulder soon after and missed six weeks of football as a result. After recovering from that injury, Ralphsmith was among Sandringham's best players in a semi-final win over the Calder Cannons, recording 19 disposals, eight marks and three goals. He added one goal in the club's losing preliminary final against the Oakleigh Chargers.

=== AFL recruitment ===
Following the end of the 2019 junior season, Ralphsmith was invited to test athletically at the AFL Draft Combine. There he recorded the equal fifth best results on the two kilometre time trial (6 minutes 12 seconds) and the running vertical jump test (86 cm) of any player that year.

Prior to the draft, Ralphsmith was projected by to be selected at pick 29 by AFL Media, at pick 34 by Aussie Rules Draft Central, at pick 35 by Fox Sports and at pick 42 by ESPN.

He was notable at this time for his speed, endurance and all-round athletic prowess and drew comparisons to Hawthorn wing Isaac Smith.

=== Junior statistics ===
Legend
G	Goals	K	Kicks	D	Disposals	T	Tackles
B	Behinds	H	Handballs	M	Marks

NAB League Boys

Season	Team	No.	Games	Totals							Averages (per game)						
Season	Team	No.	Games	G	B	K	H	D	M	T	G	B	K	H	D	M	T
2018	Sandringham Dragons	53	11	4	—	75	69	144	28	13	0.4	—	6.8	6.3	13.1	2.5	1.2
2019	Sandringham Dragons	11	10	10	—	97	62	159	38	26	1.0	—	9.7	6.2	15.9	3.8	2.6
Career			21	14	—	172	131	303	66	39	0.7	—	8.2	6.2	14.4	3.1	1.9

Under 18 National Championships

Season	Team	No.	Games	Totals							Averages (per game)						
Season	Team	No.	Games	G	B	K	H	D	M	T	G	B	K	H	D	M	T
2019	Vic Metro	21	3	2	—	16	17	33	8	6	0.7	—	5.3	5.7	11.0	2.7	2.0
Career			3	2	—	16	17	33	8	6	0.7	—	5.3	5.7	11.0	2.7	2.0

== AFL career ==
=== 2020 season ===
Ralphsmith was drafted by Richmond with the club's fourth pick and the 46th selection overall in the 2019 AFL national draft.

He began his professional career by playing pre-season VFL practice matches with the club's reserves side in March 2020. By mid-March however, reserves matches were cancelled due to safety concerns as a result of the rapid progression of the COVID-19 pandemic into Australia. Though the AFL season would start on schedule later that month, just one round of matches was played of the reduced 17-round season before the imposition of state border restrictions saw the season suspended for an indefinite hiatus. Ralphsmith returned to the reserves group when the season resumed after an 11-week hiatus, playing an unofficial scratch match against Collingwood's reserves due to AFL clubs' withdrawal from the VFL season. After three more scratch matches playing mostly as a half-forward, Ralphsmith moved with the main playing group when the club was relocated to the Gold Coast in response to a virus outbreak in Melbourne. Three matches into that stay, Ralphsmith was named as a non-playing AFL-level emergency for the club's round 8's match against Greater Western Sydney. He continued to be overlooked for AFL selection through the remainder of the season and finals series, playing reserves matches while being named as an AFL emergency on one further occasion. Ralphsmith went without making an AFL debut that year, in what was a premiership-winning season for the club.

=== 2021 season ===
Ralphsmith followed a full 2020/21 off-season training program by being named to play half-back and wing in the senior side during an unofficial pre-season match against Melbourne in February 2021. He was unable to secure selection in the club's official pre-season match however, and was restricted to appearances for club's reserves side in the VFL for the entirety of March. Ralphsmith was named an AFL emergency in round 2, but a one-week suspension earned in a VFL match that weekend denied him an opportunity to make an AFL debut in Richmond's injury-hit round 3 side. He sustained an ankle injury in the early minutes of his return match in the VFL in late April, but was able recover in time for the following week's match, before again being named an AFL-level emergency in round 8. Following injuries to Shane Edwards and Shai Bolton the previous week, Ralphsmith was called up to senior level to make his debut in the club's round 9 match against Greater Western Sydney at Marvel Stadium.

=== 2022 season ===
Ralphsmith won the Grand Final Sprint on Grand Final Day 2022.

== Player profile ==
Ralphsmith is a versatile player, featuring in various positions over two years with Richmond including as a wing, half-forward and half-back.

== Personal life ==
Hugo's father Sean played 34 matches over a seven-year Victorian/Australian Football League career with Hawthorn and St Kilda.

Ralphsmith currently studies a Bachelor of Exercise and Sport Science/Bachelor of Business (Sport Management) at Deakin University.

== Statistics ==
Updated to the end of round 22, 2026.

Legend
G	Goals	K	Kicks	D	Disposals	T	Tackles
B	Behinds	H	Handballs	M	Marks

Season	Team	No.	Games	Totals							Averages (per game)							Votes
Season	Team	No.	Games	G	B	K	H	D	M	T	G	B	K	H	D	M	T	Votes
2020 (Note: The 2020 season was played with 17 home-and-away matches per team (down from 22) and 16-minute quarters with time on (down from 20-minute quarters with time on) due to the impact of the COVID-19 pandemic.)		45	0	—	—	—	—	—	—	—	—	—	—	—	—	—	—	0
2021	Richmond	45	6	3	2	27	22	49	7	5	0.5	0.3	4.5	3.7	8.2	1.2	0.8	0
2022	Richmond	45	13	5	1	101	87	188	45	17	0.4	0.1	7.8	6.7	14.5	3.5	1.3	0
2023	Richmond	13	13	1	2	77	66	143	43	6	0.1	0.2	5.9	5.1	11.0	3.3	0.5	0
2024	Richmond	13	18	6	5	141	104	245	70	29	0.3	0.3	7.8	5.8	13.6	3.9	1.6	0
2025	Richmond	13	12	6	4	92	69	161	41	30	0.5	0.3	7.7	5.8	13.4	3.4	2.5	0
2026	Richmond	13	11	5	5	84	75	159	32	13	0.5	0.5	7.6	6.8	14.5	2.9	1.2	0
Career			73	26	19	522	423	945	238	100	0.4	0.3	7.2	5.8	12.9	3.3	1.4	0
