= Thomson Dow =

Australian footballer (born 2001)

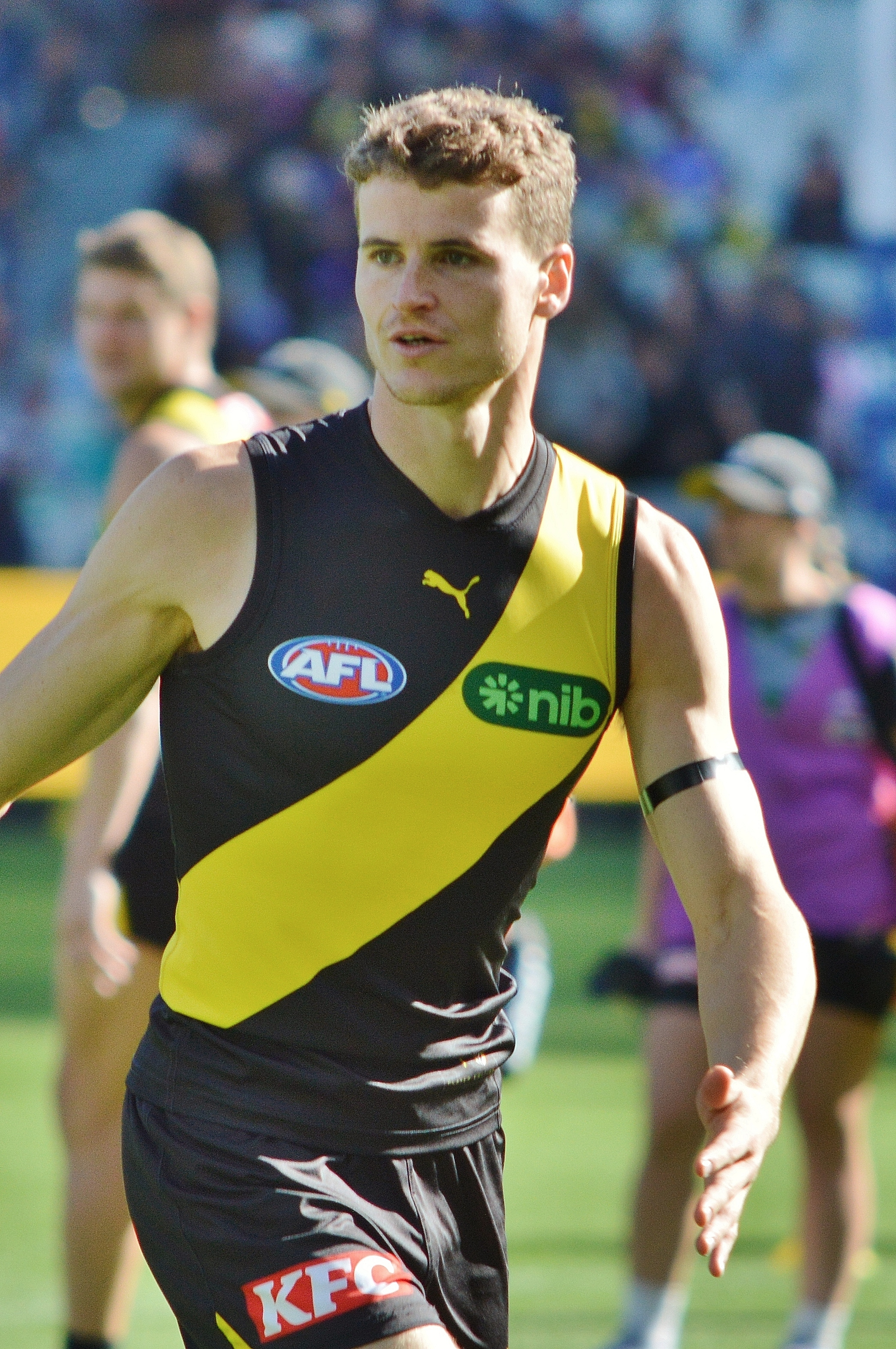
- Dow with Richmond in April 2025

Personal information
- Born: 16 October 2001 (age 25)
- Original team: Bendigo Pioneers (NAB League Boys)
- Draft: No. 21, 2019 AFL national draft
- Debut: Round 13, 2020, Richmond vs. West Coast, at Metricon Stadium
- Height: 182 cm (6 ft 0 in)
- Weight: 76 kg (168 lb)
- Position: Midfielder

Playing career
Years	Club	Games (Goals)
2020–2025	Richmond	45 (2)

Career highlights
- Cosgrove–Jenkins Award (RFC Best First-Year Player): 2020

Thomson Dow (born 16 October 2001) is a former professional Australian rules footballer who played for the Richmond Football Club in the Australian Football League (AFL). He played junior representative football with the Bendigo Pioneers, was drafted by Richmond with the 21st pick in 2019 AFL draft and made his debut in round 14 of the 2020 season. He is the younger brother of St Kilda midfielder Paddy Dow.

== Early life and junior football ==
Dow grew up on a family fruit farm outside the regional Victorian town of Swan Hill as the third of four brothers. He played junior football at the local Swan Hill Football Club, including in an under-16s premiership at age 14 alongside his older brother Paddy.

Dow later earned selection into the junior representative pathway with the Bendigo Pioneers in the NAB League and in 2017 was selected to the Victorian Country team at the Under 16s national championships.

In 2018, Dow began boarding at Geelong Grammar School but missed significant periods of the football season due to injuries, though still managed to earn selection to the AFL Academy as one of 30 Victoria Country region 16 and 17 year olds.

Alongside matches for Geelong Grammar in the APS league, Dow was a prolific ball-winner in the early weeks of the 2019 NAB League season, eventually earning selection to the Victorian Country team at the 2019 AFL Under 18 Championships. He played in each of the team's four matches at the tournament including with an 18-disposal performance in a win over the Victoria Metropolitan side. Dow returned to the Pioneers for the end of the season and continued to turn in strong performances, finishing the season as the Pioneers' leading vote getter (six) in the league best and fairest award after averaging 21.6 disposals and a goal per game across the length of the season.

Following the 2019 junior season, Dow was invited to attend the AFL National Draft Combine, where he recorded a third-place 8.061 time in the agility test. In the days prior to the draft Dow was projected to be selected at pick 27 by AFL Draft Central and pick 31 by ESPN, while being left out of the AFL Media's top 30 mock draft.

=== Junior statistics ===
Legend
G	Goals	K	Kicks	D	Disposals	T	Tackles
B	Behinds	H	Handballs	M	Marks

NAB League Boys

Season	Team	No.	Games	Totals							Averages (per game)						
Season	Team	No.	Games	G	B	K	H	D	M	T	G	B	K	H	D	M	T
2018	Bendigo Pioneers	14	4	2	—	23	24	47	8	11	0.5	—	5.8	6.0	11.8	2.0	2.8
2019	Bendigo Pioneers	4	5	5	—	46	62	108	22	12	1.0	—	9.2	12.4	21.6	4.4	2.4
Career			9	7	—	69	86	155	30	23	0.8	—	7.7	9.6	17.2	3.3	2.6

Under 18 National Championships

Season	Team	No.	Games	Totals							Averages (per game)						
Season	Team	No.	Games	G	B	K	H	D	M	T	G	B	K	H	D	M	T
2019	Vic Country	8	4	1	—	20	29	49	6	8	0.3	—	5.0	7.3	12.3	1.5	2.0
Career			4	1	—	20	29	49	6	8	0.3	—	5.0	7.3	12.3	1.5	2.0

== AFL career ==
=== 2020 season ===
Dow was drafted by Richmond with the club's first pick and the 21st selection overall in the 2019 AFL national draft.

Following a full pre-season training period, Dow made his first appearance for Richmond in the club's first 2020 pre-season series match against Collingwood in Wangaratta. He impressed head coach Damien Hardwick with five disposals in just one quarter of match play and earned another selection in the club's second and final match of the pre-season. Dow went unselected when the season began later that month and was also unable to play at reserves level after the VFL season was cancelled due to safety concerns as a result of the rapid progression of the COVID-19 pandemic into Australia. At AFL level, just one round of matches was played of the reduced 17-round season before the imposition of state border restrictions saw the season suspended for an indefinite hiatus. Dow starred in an unofficial scratch match against Collingwood's reserves when the season resumed in June following an 11-week hiatus, the first of a series of unorthodox reserves games played that season in place of the official VFL competition. He continued to play scratch matches through the rest of June, but missed one match in early-July due to a stomach illness. Dow traveled with the main playing group when the club was relocated to the Gold Coast in response to a virus outbreak in Melbourne in July, and continued to play reserves grade matches during that time. He was named a non-playing AFL emergency for the first time in round 8 and again in each of rounds 12 and 13, before being named to make an AFL debut in round 14's match against West Coast at Metricon Stadium on the Gold Coast. He recorded 12 disposals and three clearances in the match, which was played like all matches that year with playing time reduced by one fifth, owing to the pandemic-induced fixture changes that resulted in multiple games played with short breaks. After a quieter follow up performance the following week, Dow was dropped back to reserves level ahead of the club's round 17 match against Geelong. He remained there for the balance of the season and through the month of October, while his senior teammates won the club its 13th AFL premiership. Dow finished his debut season having played two AFL matches and earned the Cosgrove–Jenkins Award as Richmond's best first year player.

=== 2021 season ===
Dow completed a full pre-season training period ahead of the 2021 season, impressing in an intraclub match and participating as part of an extended playing list in a practice match against Melbourne in February. He missed out on AFL selection early in the season, but played reserves grade football with one VFL practice match in mid-March before undergoing surgery to remove his appendix later that month. Dow returned to fitness to in early May, featuring at VFL-level as an inside midfielder including as one of his side's best players with 31 disposals and six inside-50s in a win over the Greater Western Sydney reserves in mid-May. He was named an AFL-level emergency in each of the next two weeks, but ultimately went until round 16 to earn his first AFL match of the year, picked to play against the Gold Coast following a performance at reserves level that included 23 disposals, eight clearances and a goal.

Dow was delisted by Richmond at the end of the 2025 AFL season after 45 matches over six seasons.

In December 2025, Dow was signed to North Melbourne's VFL for the 2026 season.

== Player profile ==
Dow plays as an inside midfielder. He is notable for his lateral quickness, handballing prowess and ability to win clearances from stoppage situations.

== Personal life ==
He is the younger brother of St Kilda midfielder Paddy Dow.

== Statistics ==
Legend
G	Goals	K	Kicks	D	Disposals	T	Tackles
B	Behinds	H	Handballs	M	Marks

Season	Team	No.	Games	Totals							Averages (per game)							Votes
Season	Team	No.	Games	G	B	K	H	D	M	T	G	B	K	H	D	M	T	Votes
2020 (Note: The 2020 season was played with 17 home-and-away matches per team (down from 22) and 16-minute quarters with time on (down from 20-minute quarters with time on) due to the impact of the COVID-19 pandemic.)	Richmond	27	2	0	0	2	14	16	2	4	0.0	0.0	1.0	7.0	8.0	1.0	2.0	0
2021	Richmond	27	5	0	2	29	37	66	16	5	0.0	0.4	5.8	7.4	13.2	3.2	1.0	0
2022	Richmond	27	6	1	0	34	53	87	7	16	0.2	0.0	5.7	8.8	14.5	1.2	2.7	0
2023	Richmond	27	4	0	2	27	43	70	10	8	0.0	0.5	6.8	10.8	17.5	2.5	2.0	0
2024	Richmond	27	17	0	2	89	177	266	36	39	0.0	0.1	5.2	10.4	15.6	2.1	2.3	0
2025	Richmond	27	11	1	2	73	131	204	38	32	0.1	0.2	6.6	11.9	18.5	3.5	2.9	0
Career			45	2	8	254	455	709	109	104	0.0	0.2	5.6	10.1	15.8	2.4	2.3	0
