= 22 Under 22 team =

Australian rules football team

The 22 Under 22 team (stylised as 22under22) is an honorary representative Australian rules football team created by the AFL Players' Association that seeks to recognise the best young talent in the Australian Football League (AFL) and AFL Women's (AFLW) competitions each year. To be eligible for selection, players must be aged 22 or under for the entire season (including finals). An initial squad of 40 is selected by the AFL Players' Board, before fans select a final team of 22 by voting via social media.

== Selection process ==
The 22 Under 22 team is the only AFL award decided by fans. Supporters were asked to pick their best teams via Facebook, or vote for individual players via Twitter.

The concept proved to be popular amongst AFL players, with many high-profile footballers voting and sharing their teams on social media. Current stars Gary Ablett Jr., Drew Petrie, Brad Sewell, Luke Ball, Andrew Swallow and Isaac Smith all selected sides, as did former players Cameron Mooney, Daniel Harford and Warwick Capper.

Several AFL journalists, including Mick Warner and Warwick Green, also voted and shared their teams.

== AFL teams ==
=== 2012 ===
In the lead-up to the first 22 Under 22 team being announced, the AFL Players' Association selected a retrospective side from the 2012 season. Adelaide's Patrick Dangerfield was named captain, while young stars Trent Cotchin, Dayne Beams and Nic Naitanui were amongst those selected.

B	Phil Davis (Greater Western Sydney)	Daniel Talia (Adelaide)	Alex Rance (Richmond)
HB	Dyson Heppell (Essendon)	Jackson Trengove (Port Adelaide)	Callan Ward (Greater Western Sydney)
C	Steele Sidebottom (Collingwood)	Patrick Dangerfield (Adelaide) (c)	Dan Hannebery (Sydney)
HF	David Zaharakis (Essendon)	Jack Darling (West Coast)	Dustin Martin (Richmond)
F	Luke Breust (Hawthorn)	Taylor Walker (Adelaide)	Steven Motlop (Geelong)
R	Nic Naitanui (West Coast)	Trent Cotchin (Richmond)	Dayne Beams (Collingwood)
I/C	Michael Hurley (Essendon)	Jack Redden (Brisbane Lions)	
	Rory Sloane (Adelaide)	Jeremy Howe (Melbourne)	

=== 2013 ===
The inaugural 22 Under 22 team was announced at the 2013 "Be the Influence" AFL Players' MVP Awards on 10 September. Essendon midfielder Dyson Heppell was named as the side's captain, with North Melbourne's Jack Ziebell selected as the vice-captain.

Gold Coast had the most players selected of any club, with five Suns being picked in the final team – Jaeger O'Meara, Dion Prestia, Rory Thompson, Tom Nicholls and Trent McKenzie.

Rather than being awarded a medal or trophy, each player selected was presented with a New Era 22 Under 22 cap, designed by former North Melbourne player Daniel Pratt.

B	Brandon Ellis (Richmond)	Rory Thompson (Gold Coast)	Daniel Talia (Adelaide)
HB	Steele Sidebottom (Collingwood)	Jake Carlisle (Essendon)	Trent McKenzie (Gold Coast)
C	Nat Fyfe (Fremantle)	Dyson Heppell (Essendon) (c)	Dan Hannebery (Sydney)
HF	Dustin Martin (Richmond)	Jack Darling (West Coast)	Chad Wingard (Port Adelaide)
F	Luke Breust (Hawthorn)	Jeremy Cameron (Greater Western Sydney)	Steven Motlop (Geelong)
R	Tom Nicholls (Gold Coast)	Jaeger O'Meara (Gold Coast)	Tom Liberatore (Western Bulldogs)
I/C	Aaron Mullett (North Melbourne)	Dion Prestia (Gold Coast)	
	Jack Ziebell (North Melbourne) (vc)	Michael Walters (Fremantle)	

=== 2014 ===
The 2014 22 Under 22 team was announced at the 2014 AFL Players Association awards on 9 September. Essendon midfielder Dyson Heppell was named as the side's captain for the second year in a row, with Hawthorn forward Jack Gunston selected as the vice-captain.

Gold Coast had the most players represented in the side, for the second year in a row, with six representatives – Harley Bennell, Kade Kolodjashnij, Steven May, Trent McKenzie, Dion Prestia, and David Swallow.

B	Tom Langdon (Collingwood)	Daniel Talia (Adelaide)	Trent McKenzie (Gold Coast)
HB	Brodie Smith (Adelaide)	Steven May (Gold Coast)	Kade Kolodjashnij (Gold Coast)
C	Luke Parker (Sydney)	Dyson Heppell (Essendon) (c)	Harley Bennell (Gold Coast)
HF	Adam Treloar (Greater Western Sydney)	Jack Darling (West Coast)	Marcus Bontempelli (Western Bulldogs)
F	Chad Wingard (Port Adelaide)	Jack Gunston (Hawthorn) (vc)	Jamie Elliott (Collingwood)
R	Jarrod Witts (Collingwood)	Tom Liberatore (Western Bulldogs)	Dion Prestia (Gold Coast)
I/C	Luke McDonald (North Melbourne)	David Swallow (Gold Coast)	
	Brandon Ellis (Richmond)	Jake Carlisle (Essendon)	

=== 2015 ===
The 2015 22 Under 22 team was announced at the 2015 AFL Players Association awards on 15 September. Western Bulldogs forward Jake Stringer was named as the side's captain, with Sydney midfielder Luke Parker selected as the vice-captain.

Greater Western Sydney had the most players represented in the side, with four selections – Jeremy Cameron, Dylan Shiel, Devon Smith, and Adam Treloar.

B	Rory Laird (Adelaide)	Jack Hombsch (Port Adelaide)	Kade Kolodjashnij (Gold Coast)
HB	Adam Saad (Gold Coast)	Jake Lever (Adelaide)	Elliot Yeo (West Coast)
C	Lachie Neale (Fremantle)	Patrick Cripps (Carlton)	Adam Treloar (Greater Western Sydney)
HF	Jake Stringer (Western Bulldogs) (c)	Jesse Hogan (Melbourne)	Luke Parker (Sydney) (vc)
F	Chad Wingard (Port Adelaide)	Jeremy Cameron (Greater Western Sydney)	Tom Lynch (Gold Coast)
R	Brodie Grundy (Collingwood)	Marcus Bontempelli (Western Bulldogs)	Ollie Wines (Port Adelaide)
I/C	Tom Langdon (Collingwood)	Dylan Shiel (Greater Western Sydney)	
	Brandon Ellis (Richmond)	Devon Smith (Greater Western Sydney)	

=== 2016 ===
The 2016 22 Under 22 team was announced on 13 September. Western Bulldogs midfielder Marcus Bontempelli was named as the side's captain, with Essendon midfielder Zach Merrett selected as the vice-captain.

B	Rory Laird (Adelaide)	Jacob Weitering (Carlton)	Sam Docherty (Carlton)
HB	Callum Mills (Sydney)	Jake Lever (Adelaide)	Zac Williams (Greater Western Sydney)
C	Zach Merrett (Essendon) (vc)	Patrick Cripps (Carlton)	Stephen Coniglio (Greater Western Sydney)
HF	Isaac Heeney (Sydney)	Jesse Hogan (Melbourne)	Christian Petracca (Melbourne)
F	Jake Stringer (Western Bulldogs)	Joe Daniher (Essendon)	Darcy Moore (Collingwood)
R	Brodie Grundy (Collingwood)	Marcus Bontempelli (Western Bulldogs) (c)	Jack Viney (Melbourne)
I/C	Jack Martin (Gold Coast)	Tim Membrey (St Kilda)	
	Ollie Wines (Port Adelaide)	Lachie Hunter (Western Bulldogs)	

=== 2017 ===
The 2017 22 Under 22 team was announced on 12 September. Western Bulldogs midfielder Marcus Bontempelli was named as the side's captain for the second consecutive season, with Essendon midfielder Zach Merrett selected as the vice-captain also for the second consecutive season.

B	Andrew McGrath (Essendon)	Harris Andrews (Brisbane Lions)	Callum Mills (Sydney)
HB	Jayden Hunt (Melbourne)	Jake Lever (Adelaide)	Ryan Burton (Hawthorn)
C	Marcus Bontempelli (Western Bulldogs) (c)	Clayton Oliver (Melbourne)	Josh Kelly (Greater Western Sydney)
HF	Jack Billings (St Kilda)	Charlie Curnow (Carlton)	Jack Martin (Gold Coast)
F	Orazio Fantasia (Essendon)	Eric Hipwood (Brisbane Lions)	Tom Papley (Sydney)
R	Peter Wright (Gold Coast)	Zach Merrett (Essendon) (vc)	Matt Crouch (Adelaide)
I/C	James Sicily (Hawthorn)	Isaac Heeney (Sydney)	
	Ollie Wines (Port Adelaide)	Daniel Rioli (Richmond)	

=== 2018 ===
The 2018 22 Under 22 team was announced on 30 August. Western Bulldogs midfielder Marcus Bontempelli was named as the side's captain for the third consecutive season, with Melbourne midfielder Clayton Oliver selected as the vice-captain.

B	Alex Witherden (Brisbane Lions)	Harris Andrews (Brisbane Lions)	Andrew McGrath (Essendon)
HB	Conor McKenna (Essendon)	Tom Doedee (Adelaide)	Jayden Short (Richmond)
C	Angus Brayshaw (Melbourne)	Clayton Oliver (Melbourne) (vc)	Isaac Heeney (Sydney)
HF	Jade Gresham (St Kilda)	Charlie Curnow (Carlton)	Jordan De Goey (Collingwood)
F	Ben Ronke (Sydney)	Eric Hipwood (Brisbane Lions)	Jaidyn Stephenson (Collingwood)
R	Sean Darcy (Fremantle)	Marcus Bontempelli (Western Bulldogs) (c)	Zach Merrett (Essendon)
I/C	Ed Langdon (Fremantle)	Christian Petracca (Melbourne)	
	Tom Phillips (Collingwood)	Dan Butler (Richmond)	

=== 2019 ===
The 2019 22 Under 22 team was announced on 29 August. Brisbane Lions key defender Harris Andrews was named as the side's captain, with Western Bulldogs midfielder Josh Dunkley selected as the vice-captain.

B	Sydney Stack (Richmond)	Harris Andrews (Brisbane Lions) (c)	Callum Mills (Sydney)
HB	Alex Witherden (Brisbane Lions)	Jacob Weitering (Carlton)	Dan Houston (Port Adelaide)
C	Hugh McCluggage (Brisbane Lions)	Clayton Oliver (Melbourne)	Sam Walsh (Carlton)
HF	Connor Rozee (Port Adelaide)	Eric Hipwood (Brisbane Lions)	Liam Ryan (West Coast)
F	Jade Gresham (St Kilda)	Aaron Naughton (Western Bulldogs)	Harry McKay (Carlton)
R	Tim English (Western Bulldogs)	Tim Taranto (Greater Western Sydney)	Josh Dunkley (Western Bulldogs) (vc)
I/C	Wayne Milera (Adelaide)	James Worpel (Hawthorn)	
	Andrew McGrath (Essendon)	Cameron Zurhaar (North Melbourne)	

=== 2020 ===
The 2020 22 Under 22 team was announced on 22 September. Essendon midfielder Andrew McGrath was named as the side's captain, with Carlton key defender Jacob Weitering selected as the vice-captain.

B	Jack Lukosius (Gold Coast)	Jacob Weitering (Carlton) (vc)	Jordan Ridley (Essendon)
HB	Hunter Clark (St Kilda)	Noah Balta (Richmond)	Liam Baker (Richmond)
C	Hugh McCluggage (Brisbane Lions)	Andrew McGrath (Essendon) (c)	Sam Walsh (Carlton)
HF	Zak Butters (Port Adelaide)	Aaron Naughton (Western Bulldogs)	Gryan Miers (Geelong)
F	Izak Rankine (Gold Coast)	Max King (St Kilda)	Josh Daicos (Collingwood)
R	Sean Darcy (Fremantle)	Bailey Smith (Western Bulldogs)	Tim Taranto (Greater Western Sydney)
I/C	Nick Coffield (St Kilda)	Andrew Brayshaw (Fremantle)	
	Adam Cerra (Fremantle)	Ben King (Gold Coast)	

=== 2021 ===
The 2021 22 Under 22 team was announced on 26 August. Carlton midfielder Sam Walsh was named as the side's captain, with Fremantle midfielder Andrew Brayshaw selected as the vice-captain.

B	Brandon Starcevich (Brisbane Lions)	Sam Taylor (Greater Western Sydney)	Wil Powell (Gold Coast)
HB	Changkuoth Jiath (Hawthorn)	Jordan Ridley (Essendon)	Isaac Quaynor (Collingwood)
C	Bailey Smith (Western Bulldogs)	Sam Walsh (Carlton) (c)	Jack Lukosius (Gold Coast)
HF	Shai Bolton (Richmond)	Aaron Naughton (Western Bulldogs)	Zac Bailey (Brisbane Lions)
F	Kysaiah Pickett (Melbourne)	Ben King (Gold Coast)	Max King (St Kilda)
R	Luke Jackson (Melbourne)	Andrew Brayshaw (Fremantle) (vc)	Adam Cerra (Fremantle)
I/C	Jaidyn Stephenson (North Melbourne)	Oscar Allen (West Coast)	
	Tom McCartin (Sydney)	Trent Rivers (Melbourne)	

=== 2022 ===
The 2022 22 Under 22 team was announced on 23 August. Fremantle midfielder Andrew Brayshaw was named as the side's captain, with Carlton midfielder Sam Walsh selected as the vice-captain.

B	Hayden Young (Fremantle)	Sam De Koning (Geelong)	Nick Blakey (Sydney)
HB	Nick Daicos (Collingwood)	Tom McCartin (Sydney)	Jordan Clark (Fremantle)
C	Noah Anderson (Gold Coast)	Andrew Brayshaw (Fremantle) (c)	Adam Cerra (Carlton)
HF	Connor Rozee (Port Adelaide)	Aaron Naughton (Western Bulldogs)	Jack Ginnivan (Collingwood)
F	Kysaiah Pickett (Melbourne)	Max King (St Kilda)	Izak Rankine (Gold Coast)
R	Luke Jackson (Melbourne)	Sam Walsh (Carlton) (vc)	Bailey Smith (Western Bulldogs)
I/C	Chad Warner (Sydney)	Caleb Serong (Fremantle)	
	Isaac Quaynor (Collingwood)	Keidean Coleman (Brisbane Lions)	

=== 2023 ===
The 2023 22 Under 22 team was announced on 23 August. Collingwood midfielder Nick Daicos was named as the side's captain, with Hawthorn midfielder Jai Newcombe selected as the vice-captain.

B	Nasiah Wanganeen-Milera (St Kilda)	Sam De Koning (Geelong)	Miles Bergman (Port Adelaide)
HB	Nick Daicos (Collingwood) (c)	Hayden Young (Fremantle)	Harry Sheezel (North Melbourne)
C	Errol Gulden (Sydney)	Caleb Serong (Fremantle)	Will Ashcroft (Brisbane Lions)
HF	Mitch Owens (St Kilda)	Jamarra Ugle-Hagan (Western Bulldogs)	Cody Weightman (Western Bulldogs)
F	Kysaiah Pickett (Melbourne)	Jye Amiss (Fremantle)	Josh Rachele (Adelaide)
R	Luke Jackson (Fremantle)	Tom Green (Greater Western Sydney)	Jai Newcombe (Hawthorn) (vc)
I/C	Bailey Smith (Western Bulldogs)	Chad Warner (Sydney)	
	Will Day (Hawthorn)	Noah Anderson (Gold Coast)	

=== 2024 ===
The 2024 22 Under 22 team was announced on 22 August. Collingwood midfielder Nick Daicos was named as the side's captain for the second year running, with North Melbourne midfielder Harry Sheezel selected as the vice-captain.

B	Nasiah Wanganeen-Milera (St Kilda)	Mac Andrew (Gold Coast)	Darcy Wilmot (Brisbane Lions)
HB	Max Holmes (Geelong)	Josh Weddle (Hawthorn)	Colby McKercher (North Melbourne)
C	Errol Gulden (Sydney)	Harley Reid (West Coast)	Jason Horne-Francis (Port Adelaide)
HF	Jack Ginnivan (Hawthorn)	Sam Darcy (Western Bulldogs)	Oliver Dempsey (Geelong)
F	Josh Treacy (Fremantle)	Jamarra Ugle-Hagan (Western Bulldogs)	Jye Amiss (Fremantle)
R	Luke Jackson (Fremantle)	Harry Sheezel (North Melbourne) (vc)	Nick Daicos (Collingwood) (c)
I/C	Massimo D'Ambrosio (Hawthorn)	George Wardlaw (North Melbourne)	
	Josh Rachele (Adelaide)	Josh Draper (Fremantle)	

=== 2025 ===
The 2025 22 Under 22 team was announced on 20 August. Collingwood midfielder Nick Daicos was named as the side's captain for the third year running, with St Kilda defender Nasiah Wanganeen-Milera selected as the vice-captain.

B	Max Michalanney (Adelaide)	Mac Andrew (Gold Coast)	Darcy Wilmot (Brisbane Lions)
HB	Jaspa Fletcher (Brisbane Lions)	Josh Weddle (Hawthorn)	Nasiah Wanganeen-Milera (St Kilda) (vc)
C	Harry Sheezel (North Melbourne)	Harley Reid (West Coast)	Finn Callaghan (Greater Western Sydney)
HF	Josh Rachele (Adelaide)	Logan Morris (Brisbane Lions)	Jason Horne-Francis (Port Adelaide)
F	Murphy Reid (Fremantle)	Aaron Cadman (Greater Western Sydney)	Nate Caddy (Essendon)
R	Sam Darcy (Western Bulldogs)	Will Ashcroft (Brisbane Lions)	Nick Daicos (Collingwood) (c)
I/C	Oliver Dempsey (Geelong)	Levi Ashcroft (Brisbane Lions)	
	Dan Curtin (Adelaide)	Nick Watson (Hawthorn)	

=== 2026 ===
The 2026 22 Under 22 team was announced on 19 August. North Melbourne midfielder Harry Sheezel was named as the side's captain, with Brisbane Lions midfielder Will Ashcroft selected as the vice-captain.

B	Josh Weddle (Hawthorn)	Harry Dean (Carlton)	Darcy Wilmot (Brisbane Lions)
HB	Connor O'Sullivan (Geelong)	Reuben Ginbey (West Coast)	Jaspa Fletcher (Brisbane Lions)
C	Murphy Reid (Fremantle)	Will Ashcroft (Brisbane Lions) (vc)	Jagga Smith (Carlton)
HF	Darcy Wilson (St Kilda)	Aaron Cadman (Greater Western Sydney)	Colby McKercher (North Melbourne)
F	Nick Watson (Hawthorn)	Logan Morris (Brisbane Lions)	Nate Caddy (Essendon)
R	Cooper Trembath (North Melbourne)	Harry Sheezel (North Melbourne) (c)	Harley Reid (West Coast)
I/C	Mac Andrew (Gold Coast)	Willem Duursma (West Coast)	
	Archie Roberts (Essendon)	Ryley Sanders (Western Bulldogs)	

=== Most selections ===
Selections	Player	Seasons
5	Marcus Bontempelli	2014, 2015, 2016 (c), 2017 (c), 2018 (c)
4	Andrew McGrath	2017, 2018, 2019, 2020 (c)
4	Sam Walsh	2019, 2020, 2021 (c), 2022 (vc)
4	Aaron Naughton	2019, 2020, 2021, 2022
4	Bailey Smith	2020, 2021, 2022, 2023
4	Nick Daicos	2022, 2023 (c), 2024 (c), 2025 (c)
4	Luke Jackson	2021, 2022, 2023, 2024
4	Harry Sheezel	2023, 2024, 2025 2026 (c)
3	Jack Darling	2012, 2013, 2014
3	Daniel Talia	2012, 2013, 2014
3	Chad Wingard	2013, 2014, 2015
3	Jake Lever	2015, 2016, 2017
3	Ollie Wines	2015, 2016, 2017
3	Isaac Heeney	2016, 2017, 2018
3	Zach Merrett	2016 (vc), 2017 (vc), 2018
3	Harris Andrews	2017, 2018, 2019 (c)
3	Callum Mills	2016, 2017, 2019
3	Clayton Oliver	2017, 2018 (vc), 2019
3	Eric Hipwood	2017, 2018, 2019
3	Jacob Weitering	2016, 2019, 2020 (vc)
3	Andrew Brayshaw	2020, 2021 (vc), 2022 (c)
3	Adam Cerra	2020, 2021, 2022
3	Max King	2020, 2021, 2022
3	Kysaiah Pickett	2021, 2022, 2023
3	Nasiah Wanganeen-Milera	2023, 2024, 2025 (vc)
3	Josh Rachele	2023, 2024, 2025
3	Will Ashcroft	2023, 2025, 2026 (vc)
3	Mac Andrew	2024, 2025, 2026
3	Darcy Wilmot	2024, 2025, 2026
3	Josh Weddle	2024, 2025, 2026
3	Harley Reid	2024, 2025, 2026

== AFLW teams ==
=== 2017–2019 ===
No AFLW 22 Under 22 teams were awarded in the 2017 to 2019 seasons. On March 24 the AFLPA announced a retrospective team covering those three seasons.

B	Libby Birch (Western Bulldogs)	Chloe Molloy (Collingwood)	
HB	Gab Pound (Carlton)	Brianna Davey (Carlton/Collingwood)	Sarah Allan (Adelaide)
C	Emily Bates (Brisbane)	Ebony Marinoff (Adelaide)	Ally Anderson (Brisbane)
HF	Ellie Blackburn (Western Bulldogs)	Tayla Harris (Brisbane/Carlton)	Jasmine Garner (Collingwood/North Melbourne)
F	Sabrina Frederick (Brisbane)	Kate Hore (Melbourne)	
R	Emma King (Collingwood/North Melbourne)	Monique Conti (Western Bulldogs)	Maddy Prespakis (Carlton)
I/C	Erin McKinnon (Greater Western Sydney)	Shannon Campbell (Brisbane)	Anne Hatchard (Adelaide)
	Alyce Parker (Greater Western Sydney)	Danielle Ponter (Adelaide)	Sophie Conway (Brisbane)

=== 2020 ===
The 2020 AFLW 22 Under 22 team was announced on 20 April. Collingwood defender Chloe Molloy was named as the side's captain, with Carlton midfielder Maddy Prespakis selected as the vice-captain.

B	Chloe Molloy (Collingwood) (c)	Libby Birch (Melbourne)	
HB	Isabel Huntington (Western Bulldogs)	Gabby Newton (Western Bulldogs)	Charlotte Wilson (Carlton)
C	Georgia Patrikios (St Kilda)	Alyce Parker (Greater Western Sydney)	Monique Conti (Richmond)
HF	Georgia Gee (Carlton)	Sabreena Duffy (Fremantle)	Kalinda Howarth (Gold Coast)
F	Roxanne Roux (Fremantle)	Caitlin Greiser (St Kilda)	
R	Lauren Bella (Gold Coast)	Maddy Prespakis (Carlton) (vc)	Ebony Marinoff (Adelaide)
I/C	Sarah Allan (Adelaide)	Nina Morrison (Geelong)	Jesse Wardlaw (Brisbane)
	Jasmine Grierson (North Melbourne)	Eden Zanker (Melbourne)	Sophie Conway (Brisbane)

=== 2021 ===
The 2021 AFLW 22 Under 22 team was announced on 20 April. Collingwood defender Chloe Molloy was named as the side's captain for the second consecutive year, with Carlton midfielder Maddy Prespakis once more selected as the vice-captain.

B	Nat Grider (Brisbane)	Tahlia Randall (North Melbourne)	
HB	Jordyn Allen (Collingwood)	Rebecca Webster (Geelong)	Eleanor Brown (Western Bulldogs)
C	Maddy Prespakis (Carlton) (vc)	Georgia Patrikios (St Kilda)	Monique Conti (Richmond)
HF	Courtney Hodder (Brisbane)	Chloe Molloy (Collingwood) (c)	Tyla Hanks (Melbourne)
F	Georgia Gee (Carlton)	Isabel Huntington (Western Bulldogs)	
R	Eden Zanker (Melbourne)	Ellie McKenzie (Richmond)	Alyce Parker (Greater Western Sydney)
I/C	Georgia Garnett (Greater Western Sydney)	Jess Fitzgerald (Western Bulldogs)	Sabreena Duffy (Fremantle)
	Emma O'Driscoll (Fremantle)	Mikala Cann (Collingwood)	Dakota Davidson (Brisbane)

=== 2022 (S6) ===
The 2022 (S6) AFLW 22 Under 22 team was announced on 29 March. Richmond midfielder Monique Conti was named as the side's captain, with Carlton midfielder Maddy Prespakis once more selected as the vice-captain.

B	Nat Grider (Brisbane)	Emma O'Driscoll (Fremantle)	
HB	Rebecca Webster (Geelong)	Jordyn Allen (Collingwood)	Eleanor Brown (Western Bulldogs)
C	Georgie Prespakis (Geelong)	Alyce Parker (Greater Western Sydney)	Charlie Rowbottom (Gold Coast)
HF	Tyla Hanks (Melbourne)	Eloise Jones (Adelaide)	Georgia Gee (Carlton)
F	Jesse Wardlaw (Brisbane)	Danielle Ponter (Adelaide)	
R	Tahlia Hickie (Brisbane)	Monique Conti (Richmond) (c)	Maddy Prespakis (Carlton) (vc)
I/C	Ellie Hampson (Gold Coast)	Claudia Whitfort (Gold Coast)	Tarni White (St Kilda)
	Isabelle Pritchard (Western Bulldogs)	Shelley Heath (Melbourne)	Lauren Butler (Collingwood)

=== 2022 (S7) ===
The 2022 (S7) AFLW 22 Under 22 team was announced on 22 November. Richmond midfielder Monique Conti and Essendon midfielder Maddy Prespakis were once again named as the side's captain and vice-captain.

B	Katie Lynch (Western Bulldogs)	Lucy McEvoy (Carlton)	
HB	Emma O'Driscoll (Fremantle)	Nat Grider (Brisbane)	Jordyn Allen (Collingwood)
C	Charlie Rowbottom (Gold Coast)	Monique Conti (Richmond) (c)	Abbie McKay (Carlton)
HF	Nina Morrison (Geelong)	Jesse Wardlaw (Brisbane)	Ellie McKenzie (Richmond)
F	Danielle Ponter (Adelaide)	Courtney Hodder (Brisbane)	
R	Tahlia Hickie (Brisbane)	Maddy Prespakis (Essendon) (vc)	Georgie Prespakis (Geelong)
I/C	Jasmine Fleming (Hawthorn)	Alex Ballard (Port Adelaide)	Tarni Evans (Greater Western Sydney)
	Annabel Johnson (Geelong)	Madison Newman (Adelaide)	Eleanor Brown (Western Bulldogs)

=== 2023 ===
The 2023 AFLW 22 Under 22 team was announced on 22 November. Gold Coast midfielder Charlie Rowbottom was named the side's captain, with Geelong midfielder Georgie Prespakis named the side's vice-captain.

B	Daisy D'Arcy (Gold Coast)	Tahlia Gillard (Melbourne)	
HB	Gabrielle Newton (Western Bulldogs)	Lucy McEvoy (Sydney)	Tarni Evans (Greater Western Sydney)
C	Georgie Prespakis (Geelong) (vc)	Charlie Rowbottom (Gold Coast) (c)	Nina Morrison (Geelong)
HF	Ella Roberts (West Coast)	Mia Austin (Carlton)	Teah Charlton (Adelaide)
F	Zarlie Goldsworthy (Greater Western Sydney)	Alyssa Bannan (Melbourne)	
R	Ally Morphett (Sydney)	Laura Gardiner (Sydney)	Isabel Dawes (Brisbane)
I/C	Ella Heads (Sydney)	Eliza McNamara (Melbourne)	Madison Newman (Adelaide)
	Alice O'Loughlin (North Melbourne)	Matilda Scholz (Port Adelaide)	Sophie Van De Heuvel (Essendon)

=== 2024 ===
The 2024 AFLW 22 Under 22 team was announced on 20 November. Georgie Prespakis and Charlie Rowbottom, captain and vice-captain respectively, became the fourth and fifth players to be selected in four or more squads. Port Adelaide had the most representatives (four) and three 22under22 debutants.

B	Sarah Goodwin (Adelaide)	Amelie Borg (Port Adelaide)	
HB	Daisy D'Arcy (Gold Coast)	Zoe Prowse (Adelaide)	Charlotte Thomas (West Coast)
C	Ella Roberts (West Coast) (vc)	Abbey Dowrick (Port Adelaide)	Jasmine Fleming (Hawthorn)
HF	Tarni Evans (Greater Western Sydney)	Julia Teakle (Port Adelaide)	Zarlie Goldsworthy (Greater Western Sydney)
F	Alice O'Loughlin (North Melbourne)	Charlotte Mullins (Brisbane)	
R	Matilda Scholz (Port Adelaide)	Charlie Rowbottom (Gold Coast) (vc)	Georgie Prespakis (Geelong) (c)
I/C	Tahlia Gillard (Melbourne)	Teah Charlton (Adelaide)	Eliza McNamara (Melbourne)
	Mimi Hill (Carlton)	Sarah Hartwig (Western Bulldogs)	Lucy Cronin (Collingwood)

=== 2025 ===
The 2025 AFLW 22 under 22 team was announced on 12 November. Excluding the retrospective selections of 2017–2019, Georgie Prespakis and Charlie Rowbottom became the first female players to be selected in five squads, joining Marcus Bontempelli as the only three players to achieve the feat. West Coast had the most representatives in the final team with four, while Port Adelaide had six players in the extended squad.

B	Ella Heads (Port Adelaide)	Georgie Cleaver (West Coast)	
HB	Zippy Fish (Sydney)	Poppy Scholz (Carlton)	Charlotte Thomas (West Coast)
C	Ash Centra (Collingwood)	Charlie Rowbottom (Gold Coast)	Montana Ham (Sydney)
HF	Elaine Grigg (Western Bulldogs)	Havana Harris (Gold Coast)	Zarlie Goldsworthy (Greater Western Sydney)
F	Sophie McKay (Carlton)	Lucia Painter (West Coast)	
R	Matilda Scholz (Port Adelaide)	Ella Roberts (West Coast) (c)	Georgie Prespakis (Geelong) (vc)
I/C	Brooke Boileau (Adelaide)	Georgie Brisbane (Fremantle)	Tess Craven (North Melbourne)
	Jasmine Fleming (Hawthorn)	Amy Gaylor (Essendon)	Sarah Goodwin (Adelaide)

=== Most selections ===
Selections	Player	Seasons
5	Monique Conti	2017–2019, 2020, 2021, 2022 (S6) (c), 2022 (S7) (c)
5	Georgie Prespakis	2022 (S6), 2022 (S7), 2023 (vc), 2024 (c), 2025 (vc)
5	Maddy Prespakis	2017–2019, 2020 (vc), 2021 (vc), 2022 (S6) (vc), 2022 (S7) (vc)
5	Charlie Rowbottom	2022 (S6), 2022 (S7), 2023 (c), 2024 (vc), 2025 (c)
4	Alyce Parker	2017–2019, 2020, 2021, 2022 (S6)
3	Jordyn Allen	2021, 2022 (S6), 2022 (S7)
3	Eleanor Brown	2021, 2022 (S6), 2022 (S7)
3	Tarni Evans	2022 (S7), 2023, 2024
3	Jasmine Fleming	2022 (S7), 2024, 2025
3	Georgia Gee	2020, 2021, 2022 (S6)
3	Zarlie Goldsworthy	2023, 2024, 2025
3	Nat Grider	2021, 2022 (S6), 2022 (S7)
3	Chloe Molloy	2017–2019, 2020 (c), 2021 (c)
3	Nina Morrison	2020, 2022 (S7), 2023
3	Emma O'Driscoll	2021, 2022 (S6), 2022 (S7)
3	Danielle Ponter	2017–2019, 2022 (S6), 2022 (S7)
3	Ella Roberts	2023, 2024, 2025
3	Matilda Scholz	2023, 2024, 2025
3	Jesse Wardlaw	2020, 2022 (S6), 2022 (S7)
