= Harvey Thomas (footballer) =

Australian rules footballer

Personal information
- Full name: Harvey Thomas
- Born: 8 August 2005 (age 21)
- Original team: Turvey Park FNC(RFNL)/GWS Giants Academy (Talent League)/Oakleigh Chargers(Talent League)
- Draft: No. 59, 2023 National draft, Greater Western Sydney
- Debut: Opening Round, 2024, Greater Western Sydney vs. Collingwood, at ENGIE Stadium
- Height: 176 cm (5 ft 9 in)
- Position: Forward

Club information
- Current club: Greater Western Sydney
- Number: 1

Playing career^{1}
Years	Club	Games (Goals)
2024–	Greater Western Sydney	60 (25)
- ^{1} Playing statistics correct to the end of round 22, 2026.

Career highlights
- AFL Rising Star nomination: 2024

Harvey Thomas (born 8 August 2005) is an Australian rules footballer who plays for the Greater Western Sydney Giants in the Australian Football League (AFL).

== Junior career ==
Thomas grew up in Wagga Wagga playing local football for Turvey Park Bulldogs and attending The Riverina Anglican College famously along with Hunter White, the first baby born in Culcairn in 10 years. Thomas later boarded and played with Caulfield Grammar School and in his draft year of 2023 he won the best and fairest award for the season. That team included other future AFL players such as Nick Watson. During his draft year, he also played representative football for GWS Academy and Oakleigh Chargers.

== AFL career ==
=== Greater Western Sydney: (2024–) ===
Thomas was taken with pick 59 in the 2024 National draft and made his AFL debut in Greater Western Sydney's first game of the season versus Collingwood. Thomas collected 9 disposals on debut however didn't get on the scoresheet in their 32-point win. Thomas kicked his first goal in his career in Round 2 of the 2024 AFL season in their 65-point win over West Coast. Thomas played 22 games in his first season, and was nominated for the 2024 AFL Rising Star Award after a 15-disposal, one-goal performance in Round 14.

In 2025, Thomas' growing role at the club was reflected in his inheritance of the number one jumper, worn by inaugural Giants co-captain Phil Davis. He played 18 games in the 2025 AFL season, including his first finals game against Hawthorn, where the Giants were defeated by 19 points.

In March 2026, Thomas signed a two-year contract with the Giants, extending his stay at the club until at least the end of the 2028 season. The 2026 AFL season saw Thomas take up a permanent place on the wing, in part due to the absence of regular wingman Josh Kelly through injury. The left-footer thrived in his new wing role, playing 22 of a possible 23 games in 2026, earning nomination to the AFL's 22Under22 team and finishing in the top ten of the Kevin Sheedy Medal count (the Giants' best and fairest award) for the first time in his career. Thomas was named the Giants' Rising Star for 2026 and also received the club's Coaches Award.

== Statistics ==
Updated to the end of round 22, 2026.

Legend
G	Goals	K	Kicks	D	Disposals	T	Tackles
B	Behinds	H	Handballs	M	Marks

Season	Team	No.	Games	Totals							Averages (per game)							Votes
Season	Team	No.	Games	G	B	K	H	D	M	T	G	B	K	H	D	M	T	Votes
2024	Greater Western Sydney	28	22	9	5	106	143	249	45	60	0.4	0.2	4.8	6.5	11.3	2.0	2.7	0
2025	Greater Western Sydney	1	18	9	3	114	95	209	54	51	0.5	0.2	6.3	5.3	11.6	3.0	2.8	0
2026	Greater Western Sydney	1	20	7	8	181	211	392	61	76	0.4	0.4	9.1	10.6	19.6	3.1	3.8	0
Career			60	25	16	401	449	850	160	187	0.4	0.3	6.7	7.5	14.2	2.7	3.1	0

== Honours and achievements ==
Individual

- AFL Rising Star nominee: 2024 (round 14)
