= Harley Reid =

Australian rules footballer (born 2005)

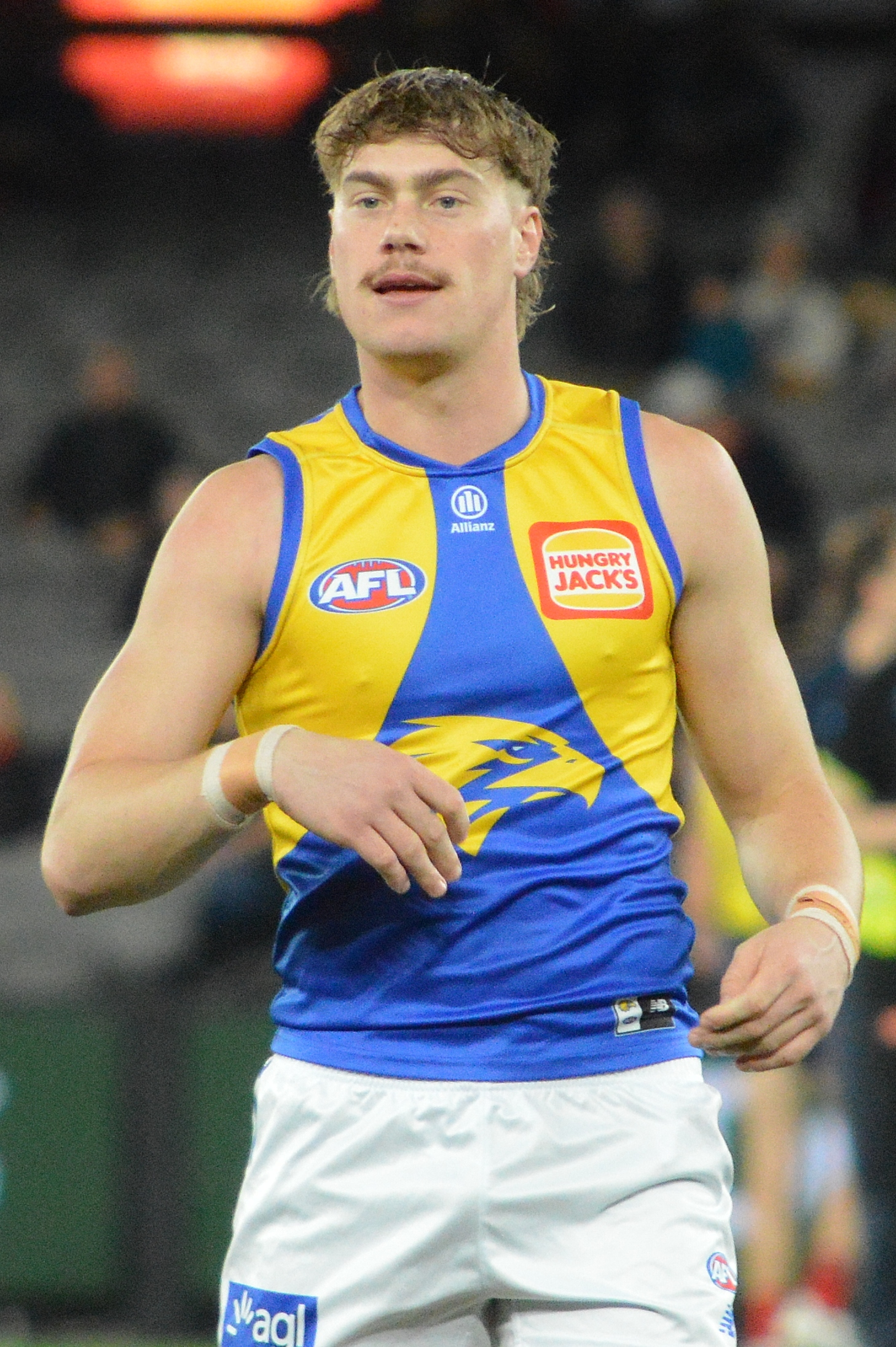
- Reid in May 2026

Personal information
- Born: 17 April 2005 (age 21); Tongala, Victoria
- Original team: Tongala/Bendigo Pioneers
- Draft: No. 1, 2023 AFL draft
- Height: 187 cm (6 ft 2 in)
- Weight: 85 kg (187 lb)
- Position: Midfielder

Club information
- Current club: West Coast
- Number: 9

Playing career^{1}
Years	Club	Games (Goals)
2024–	West Coast	60 (38)
- ^{1} Playing statistics correct to the end of round 22, 2026.

Career highlights
- John Worsfold Medal: 2026; Allen Aylett Medal: 2023; AFL Goal of the Year: 2024; 22 Under 22 team: 2024, 2025, 2026; AFLPA Best First Year Player: 2024

Harley Reid (born 17 April 2005) is a professional Australian rules footballer who plays for the West Coast Eagles in the Australian Football League (AFL). He was selected as the number-one pick in the 2023 AFL draft.

== Junior career ==
Reid grew up in the Victorian town of Tongala. He attended St Joseph's College in Echuca.

Reid played junior football for Tongala Football Club in the Murray Football Netball League. He later played representative football for the Bendigo Pioneers in the Talent League, and the Victoria Country representative side. He also played games for Essendon and Carlton in the VFL. Prior to the draft, there was intense media speculation about his destination, and there were rumours that he wanted to remain in Victoria. Scouts considered him one of the strongest draft picks of the previous decade.

== AFL career ==
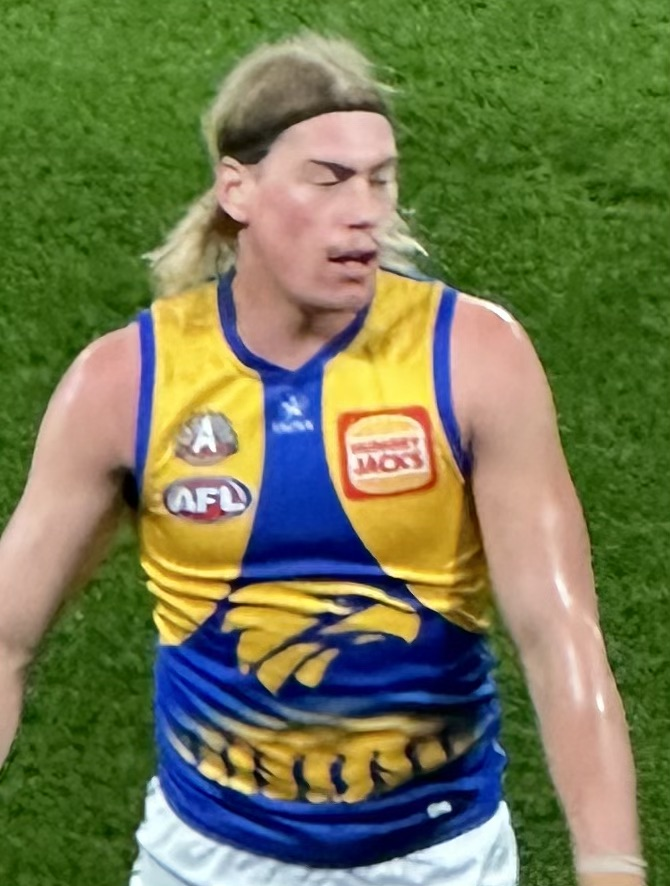
Reid playing for West Coast in 2025

Reid was selected with the first overall selection of the 2023 National Draft by the West Coast Eagles. In doing so, Reid became the inaugural winner of the Allen Aylett Medal, which is given to the player that is drafted with the first pick in each national draft. Reid instantly received much hype and fanfare, most notably from the only locally edited daily newspaper in Perth, The West Australian. Reid was featured on the back page of the newspaper 25 times, including 17 days in a row, before he had played a game, leading to questions as to whether the media scrutiny was excessive.

Reid made his AFL debut for the Eagles in their round 1 fixture against Port Adelaide at Adelaide Oval. Reid made an early impression upon the league, winning a Rising Star nomination in Round 5 for his performance against Richmond. In round 6, Reid finished second in the voting for the Glendinning–Allan Medal, awarded to the player adjudged best afield in the Western Derby between Perth-based rivals West Coast and Fremantle. Reid finished one vote behind teammate Elliot Yeo, an incredible feat in only his sixth AFL match and first Derby. Reid had 19 disposals, 7 clearances, kicked 3 goals and was nominated for the Mark of the Year award.

Reid's skill and technique at such a young age instantly won him plaudits by football journalists and former players. He has been likened to football greats such as Dustin Martin, Chris Judd and Ben Cousins, and the media hype surrounding him has been dubbed "Harley Reid mania". Reid received a second Mark of the Year nomination during the Eagles' round 9 game against Collingwood. He kicked the 2024 Goal of the Year with his running goal out of the centre of the ground in the Eagles' round 10 match against Melbourne.

In June 2024, Reid was handed a two-match suspension after a dangerous tackle on St Kilda player Darcy Wilson, rendering him ineligible to win the Rising Star award, which he was widely favoured to win.

At the completion of the 2025 season, Reid re-signed with the West Coast Eagles, keeping him tied to the club until the end of the 2028 season.

In 2026, Reid won the John Worsfold Medal, West Coast's Best and fairest award, in his third season.

== Personal life ==
Reid is of Albanian descent through his grandmother.

In April 2024, it was confirmed Reid was dating AFL Women's player Yasmin Duursma, sister of three AFL players. The high-profile couple reportedly split in mid-2025.

== Statistics ==
Updated to the end of round 22, 2026.

Legend
G	Goals	K	Kicks	D	Disposals	T	Tackles
B	Behinds	H	Handballs	M	Marks

Season	Team	No.	Games	Totals							Averages (per game)							Votes
Season	Team	No.	Games	G	B	K	H	D	M	T	G	B	K	H	D	M	T	Votes
2024	West Coast	9	20	10	8	171	200	371	45	80	0.5	0.4	8.6	10.0	18.6	2.3	4.0	7
2025	West Coast	9	19	14	11	194	164	358	48	66	0.7	0.6	10.2	8.6	18.8	2.5	3.5	3
2026	West Coast	9	21	14	26	242	278	520	40	67	0.7	1.2	11.5	13.2	24.8	1.9	3.2	0
Career			60	38	45	607	642	1249	133	213	0.6	0.8	10.1	10.7	20.8	2.2	3.6	10
