= 2024 AFL Rising Star =

Australian football award

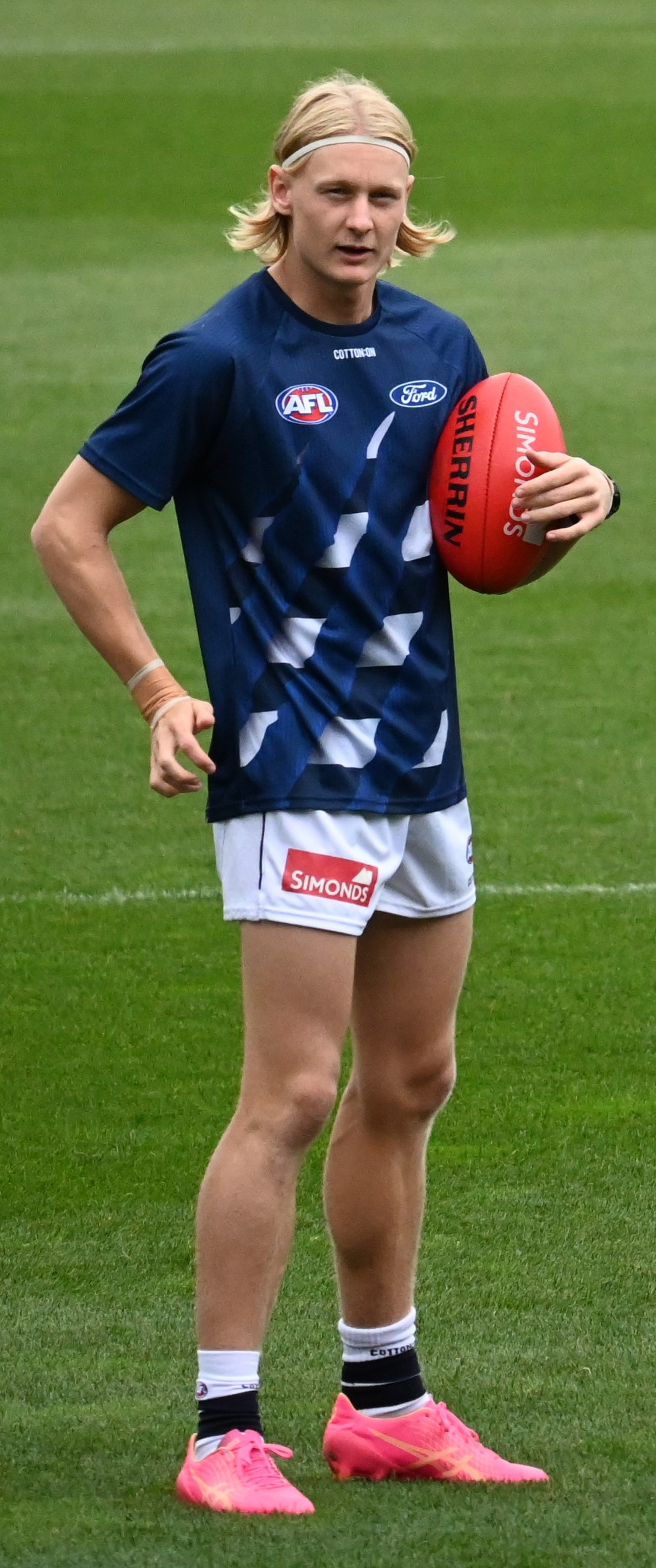
- Oliver Dempsey, recipient of the 2024 Rising Star award
- Sponsored by: Telstra
- Country: Australia
- Ron Evans medallist: Oliver Dempsey (Geelong)

The Telstra AFL Rising Star award is given annually to a standout young player in the Australian Football League (AFL). The winner also receives the Ron Evans Medal, named for the former AFL chairman.

== Eligibility ==
Every round, a nomination is given to a standout young player who performed well during that particular round. To be eligible for nomination, a player must be under 21 on 1 January of that year and have played ten or fewer senior games before the start of the season; a player who is suspended may be nominated, but is not eligible to win the award.

== Nominations ==
Key
^	Winner
*	Ineligible to win the Rising Star due to suspension.

2024 AFL Rising Star nominees
Round	Player	Club	Ref.
0	Matt Roberts	Sydney	
1	Oliver Dempsey^	Geelong	
2	George Wardlaw	North Melbourne	
3	Harvey Gallagher	Western Bulldogs	
4	Sam Darcy*	Western Bulldogs	
5	Harley Reid*	West Coast	
6	Darcy Wilson	St Kilda	
7	Jake Rogers	Gold Coast	
8	Caleb Windsor	Melbourne	
9	Colby McKercher	North Melbourne	
10	Kai Lohmann	Brisbane Lions	
11	Harvey Harrison	Collingwood	
12	Bodhi Uwland	Gold Coast	
13	Luke Nankervis	Adelaide	
14	Harvey Thomas	Greater Western Sydney	
15	Logan Morris	Brisbane Lions	
16	Will Graham	Gold Coast	
17	Darcy Jones	Greater Western Sydney	
18	Lawson Humphries	Geelong	
19	Nick Watson	Hawthorn	
20	Josh Draper	Fremantle	
21	Jackson Archer	North Melbourne	
22	Nate Caddy	Essendon	
23	Calsher Dear	Hawthorn	
24	Logan Evans	Port Adelaide	

== Final voting ==
The winner was decided by an 11-person panel consisting of Andrew Dillon (chair), Eddie Betts, Jude Bolton, Nathan Buckley, Kane Cornes, Abbey Holmes, Glen Jakovich, Laura Kane, Matthew Pavlich, Josh Mahoney and Kevin Sheehan. Each member awarded five votes to the player they determined most deserving, four votes to the second-most deserving, and so on to one vote to the fifth-most deserving.

=== Vote receivers ===
	Player	Club	Votes
1	Oliver Dempsey	Geelong	52
2	George Wardlaw	North Melbourne	43
3	Kai Lohmann	Brisbane Lions	21
4	Darcy Wilson	St Kilda	15
5	Colby McKercher	North Melbourne	12
6	Bodhi Uwland	Gold Coast	9
7	Darcy Jones	Greater Western Sydney	6
8	Matt Roberts	Sydney	3
9	Lawson Humphries	Geelong	2
=10	Caleb Windsor	Melbourne	1
=10	Logan Morris	Brisbane Lions	1

=== Full votes ===
Panel member	5 votes	4 votes	3 votes	2 votes	1 vote
Andrew Dillon (chair)	Oliver Dempsey (Geelong)	George Wardlaw (North Melbourne)	Darcy Jones (Greater Western Sydney)	Darcy Wilson (St Kilda)	Colby McKercher (North Melbourne)
Eddie Betts	Oliver Dempsey (Geelong)	George Wardlaw (North Melbourne)	Darcy Jones (Greater Western Sydney)	Lawson Humphries (Geelong)	Bodhi Uwland (Gold Coast)
Jude Bolton	Oliver Dempsey (Geelong)	George Wardlaw (North Melbourne)	Matt Roberts (Sydney)	Darcy Wilson (St Kilda)	Kai Lohmann (Brisbane Lions)
Nathan Buckley	Oliver Dempsey (Geelong)	George Wardlaw (North Melbourne)	Bodhi Uwland (Gold Coast)	Darcy Wilson (St Kilda)	Kai Lohmann (Brisbane Lions)
Kane Cornes	Oliver Dempsey (Geelong)	George Wardlaw (North Melbourne)	Darcy Wilson (St Kilda)	Bodhi Uwland (Gold Coast)	Kai Lohmann (Brisbane Lions)
Abbey Holmes	George Wardlaw (North Melbourne)	Oliver Dempsey (Geelong)	Colby McKercher (North Melbourne)	Kai Lohmann (Brisbane Lions)	Bodhi Uwland (Gold Coast)
Glen Jakovich	Oliver Dempsey (Geelong)	Kai Lohmann (Brisbane Lions)	Colby McKercher (North Melbourne)	George Wardlaw (North Melbourne)	Bodhi Uwland (Gold Coast)
Laura Kane	Oliver Dempsey (Geelong)	George Wardlaw (North Melbourne)	Colby McKercher (North Melbourne)	Kai Lohmann (Brisbane Lions)	Darcy Wilson (St Kilda)
Josh Mahoney	Kai Lohmann (Brisbane Lions)	George Wardlaw (North Melbourne)	Oliver Dempsey (Geelong)	Darcy Wilson (St Kilda)	Logan Morris (Brisbane Lions)
Matthew Pavlich	Oliver Dempsey (Geelong)	George Wardlaw (North Melbourne)	Kai Lohmann (Brisbane Lions)	Colby McKercher (North Melbourne)	Bodhi Uwland (Gold Coast)
Kevin Sheehan	Oliver Dempsey (Geelong)	George Wardlaw (North Melbourne)	Darcy Wilson (St Kilda)	Kai Lohmann (Brisbane Lions)	Caleb Windsor (Melbourne)
