= Rowville Secondary College =

Location
- Paratea Drive/Humphreys Way; Rowville, Victoria; Australia; 37°55′28″S 145°14′15″E

Information
- Type: Public state secondary college
- Motto: Nurturing strengths to grow curious and powerful learners
- Established: 1990
- School district: Eastern Metropolitan Region
- Principal: Nicole Pryor
- Gender: co-educational
- Website: www.rowvillesc.vic.edu.au

Rowville Secondary College is a co-educational, public high school, located in Rowville, Victoria, Australia. It is divided into two campuses, the East and the West. The Eastern Campus has students from years 7 to 12 in the Rowville Sports Academy and Rowville Institute of the Arts. The Western Campus has students from years 7 to 12 in both the Maths and Science Academy and the General Excellence Program. The college started off as one campus but in November 1996 the eastern campus was opened. In 2007, RSC added the Rowville Sports Academy (RSA) to its list of specialist programs. In 2008 Rowville Institute of the Arts (RIA) commenced and 2012 saw the introduction of the third specialist program – the Maths and Science Academy (MSA).

== House system ==
Rowville Secondary College has four school houses which every student and teacher is a part of. They meet with other members of their house every morning, as well as participate in a range of college events representing their house such as Athletics Day. The four houses are:

- Walton (green): Named after Nancy Bird Walton, a pioneering Australian aviator, founder and patron of the Australian Women Pilots' Association.
- Stynes (blue): Named after Jim Stynes, an AFL footballer and founder of The Reach Foundation, an organisation that works to develop the social and emotional development of young people.
- Mabo (yellow): Named after Eddie Mabo, an indigenous Australian whose landmark case recognised the land rights of the Meriam people, traditional owners of the Murray Islands in the Torres Strait.
- Aston (red): Named after Tilly Aston, a vision impaired Australian writer & teacher who founded the Victorian Association of Braille.

== Notable alumni ==
=== Science and medicine ===
- Stephanie Yiallourou – Australian sleep and dementia researcher and Senior Research Fellow at Monash University's Turner Institute for Brain and Mental Health. Her research focuses on sleep, cardiovascular health and dementia, and she has led and participated in nationally and internationally funded research programs.

=== Australian rules football ===
- Hayden Crozier – former Australian rules footballer who played for Fremantle and the Western Bulldogs.
- Jonathon Patton – former Australian rules footballer for the Greater Western Sydney Giants and Hawthorn, and the first overall selection in the 2011 AFL draft.
- Taylin Duman – former Australian rules footballer for Fremantle.
- Tom North – former Fremantle-listed Australian rules footballer.
- Sam Hayes – former Australian rules footballer for Port Adelaide.
- Bigoa Nyuon – Australian rules footballer who has been listed by Richmond and North Melbourne.
- Connor MacDonald – Australian rules footballer for Hawthorn.
- Tyler Sonsie – Australian rules footballer for Richmond.
- Jake Soligo – Australian rules footballer for the Adelaide Crows.
- Flynn Kroeger – former Geelong-listed Australian rules footballer.
- Lewis Hayes – Australian rules footballer drafted by Essendon with pick 25 in the 2022 AFL draft.
- Amber Clarke – Australian rules footballer for Essendon in the AFL Women's competition.
- Nick Watson – Australian rules footballer for Hawthorn, selected with pick five in the 2023 AFL draft.
- Caleb Windsor – Australian rules footballer for Melbourne, selected with pick seven in the 2023 AFL draft.
- Cooper Hynes – Australian rules footballer for the Western Bulldogs, selected with pick 20 in the 2024 AFL draft.
- Christian Moraes – Australian rules footballer for Port Adelaide, selected with pick 38 in the 2024 AFL draft.
- Xavier Taylor – Australian rules footballer selected by Melbourne with pick 11 in the 2025 AFL draft.
- Lachy Dovaston – Australian rules footballer selected by North Melbourne with pick 16 in the 2025 AFL draft.

=== Basketball ===
- Chloe Bibby – Australian professional basketball player who has played in the WNBA, WNBL and European professional leagues.
- Nyadiew Puoch – Australian professional basketball player and Australian representative, selected 12th overall by the Atlanta Dream in the 2024 WNBA draft.
- Luke Rosendale - South East Melbourne Phoenix

=== Netball ===
- Matilda Garrett – Australian international netball player and Australian Diamonds representative who has played for the Collingwood Magpies and Adelaide Thunderbirds.

=== Association football ===
- Paulo Retre – Australian professional association footballer who has played for Melbourne City FC and Sydney FC.
- Jake Brimmer – Australian professional footballer, former Liverpool academy player and winner of the Johnny Warren Medal.
- Rashid Mahazi – former professional footballer who played for Melbourne Victory and Western Sydney Wanderers.
- Peter Skapetis – Australian footballer who represented Australia at under-20 and under-23 level and spent time in the youth systems of Queens Park Rangers, Birmingham City and Stoke City.
- Alanah Murphy - Melbourne Victory (21-25), SC Sand 2025, Nottingham Forest 2026 (Super League 2), Matildas (debut 2025)
- Kieran Dover - Melbourne Victory

=== Golf ===
- Jasper Stubbs – Australian golfer who won the 2023 Asia-Pacific Amateur Championship, earning invitations to the 2024 Masters Tournament and 2024 Open Championship.

== Notable staff ==
- Wendy Jones
- Lou Wotton

== Basketball team achievements ==
=== Championship Men (Open) ===
- Australian Schools Championships

(silver) Runners Up: 2022
(bronze) Third Place: 2023

=== Championship Women (Open) ===
- Australian Schools Championships

(gold) Champions: (4) 2013, 2014, 2018, 2023
(silver) Runners Up: 2012, 2016

== See also ==
- List of schools in Victoria
- Victorian Certificate of Education
