= Harvey Gallagher =

Australian rules footballer

Personal information
- Full name: Harvey Gallagher
- Nickname: Gags
- Born: 26 September 2003 (age 23)
- Original team: Bendigo U18/Sandhurst
- Draft: No. 39, 2022 national draft
- Debut: 17 March 2024, Western Bulldogs vs. Melbourne Football Club, at MCG
- Height: 181 cm (5 ft 11 in)
- Weight: 78 kg (172 lb)
- Position: Forward

Club information
- Current club: Western Bulldogs
- Number: 12

Playing career^{1}
Years	Club	Games (Goals)
2024–	Western Bulldogs	28 (10)
- ^{1} Playing statistics correct to the end of round 22, 2026.

Harvey Gallagher (born 26 September 2003) is a professional Australian rules footballer for the Western Bulldogs in the Australian Football League (AFL).

== Early life and career ==
Gallagher grew up in Bendigo, and originally played for the Sandhurst Football Club.

== AFL career ==
=== 2024 Season ===
Debuting in Round 1 of the 2024 AFL season in a loss against Melbourne, Gallagher kicked his first goal in the same game. In Round 3 against the West Coast Eagles, Gallagher scored 2 goals and earned a rising star nomination.

== Statistics ==
Updated to the end of round 22, 2026.

Legend
G	Goals	K	Kicks	D	Disposals	T	Tackles
B	Behinds	H	Handballs	M	Marks

Season	Team	No.	Games	Totals							Averages (per game)							Votes
Season	Team	No.	Games	G	B	K	H	D	M	T	G	B	K	H	D	M	T	Votes
2024	Western Bulldogs	12	20	9	11	163	84	247	54	61	0.5	0.6	8.2	4.2	12.4	2.7	3.1	0
2025	Western Bulldogs	12	5	0	0	39	16	55	14	6	0.0	0.0	7.8	3.2	11.0	2.8	1.2	0
2026	Western Bulldogs	12	3	1	5	23	11	34	4	0	0.3	1.7	7.7	3.7	11.3	1.3	0.0	0
Career			28	10	16	225	111	336	72	67	0.4	0.6	8.0	4.0	12.0	2.6	2.4	0

== Honours and achievements ==
Individual

- AFL Rising Star nominee: 2024
