= Logan Morris (footballer) =

Australian rules footballer (born 2005)

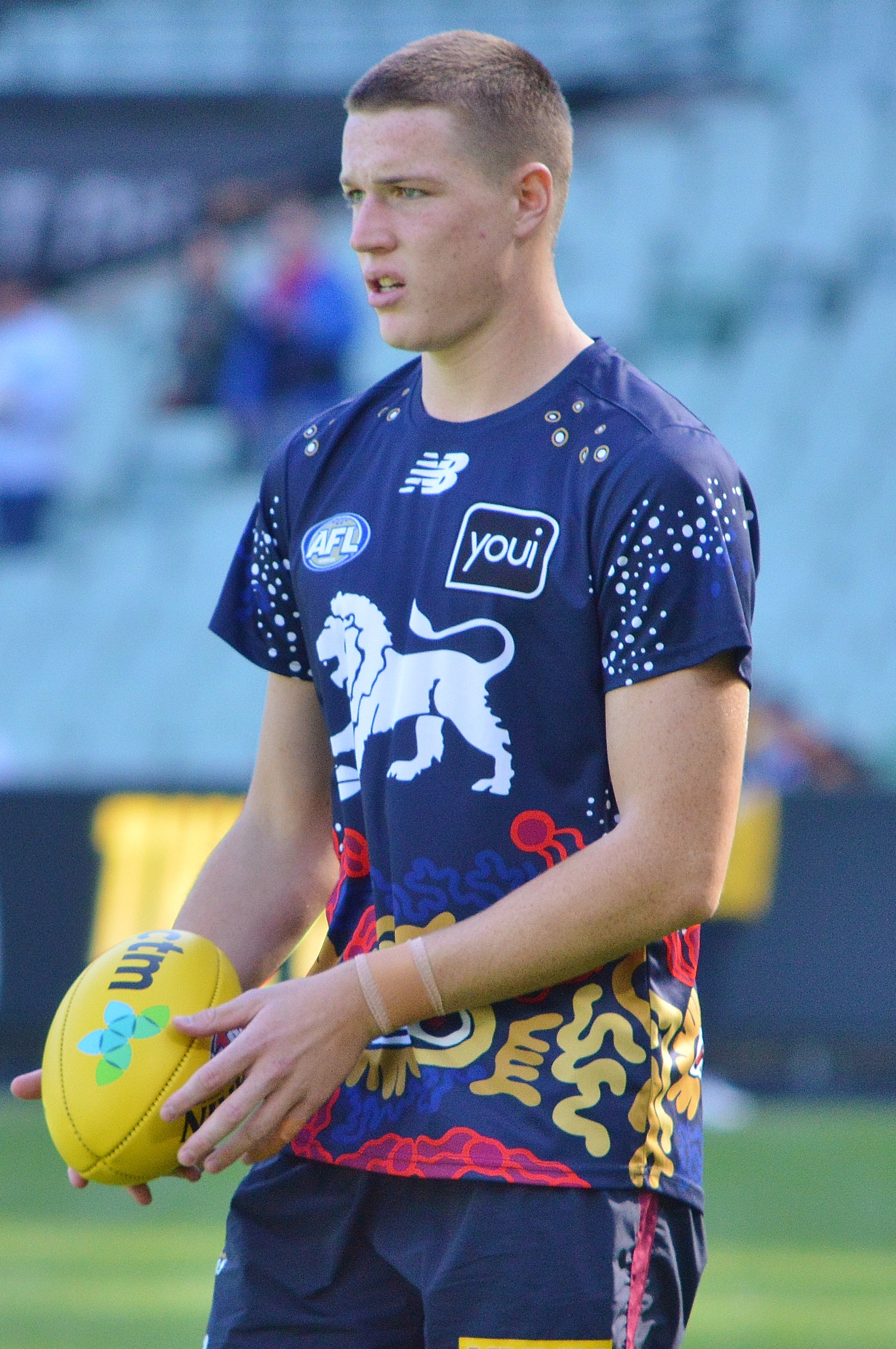
- Morris in 2025

Personal information
- Full name: Logan Morris
- Born: 10 May 2005 (age 21)
- Original teams: Western Jets (Talent League); Werribee (VFL)
- Draft: No. 31, 2023 national draft
- Debut: Round 8, 2024, Brisbane Lions vs. Gold Coast, at The Gabba
- Height: 191 cm (6 ft 3 in)
- Position: Key Forward

Club information
- Current club: Brisbane Lions
- Number: 13

Playing career^{1}
Years	Club	Games (Goals)
2024–	Brisbane Lions	71 (149)
- ^{1} Playing statistics correct to the end of the 2026 season.

Career highlights
- 3× AFL premiership player: 2024, 2025, 2026; All-Australian team: 2026; 2x Brisbane Lions leading goalkicker: 2025, 2026; Marcus Ashcroft Medal: Rd 13, 2026; AFL Rising Star nominee: 2024; 2x 22under22 team: 2025, 2026

Logan Morris (born 10 May 2005) is an Australian rules footballer currently playing for the Brisbane Lions in the Australian Football League. He was drafted with pick 31 in the 2023 AFL draft from the Western Jets.

== Junior career ==
Morris began his junior football at Spotswood Football Club in Melbourne, later moving to Werribee Districts Football Club. Attending MacKillop College in Werribee, he was a part of the 2022 SACCSS Senior Division One Grand Final Premiership Team. Morris played for Western Jets in the Talent League in 2022 and 2023 before being drafted to Brisbane. In 2023, he also played one game for VFL club Werribee and kicked 2 goals.

== AFL career ==
Morris arrived at Brisbane as a highly rated forward and kicked five goals during a preseason intra-club match. The young forward started the 2024 season in the VFL before making his debut in the round 8 QClash against Gold Coast as a late call-up due to injury. He played for the Lions' VFL side earlier in that day, famously eating a McDonald's meal between the two games. He earned an AFL Rising Star nomination in the round 15 victory over Port Adelaide for his two-goal contribution.

Morris was part of the Brisbane Lions' 2024 premiership-winning team in his first season in the league, kicking two goals in the grand final. At the age of 19, he was the youngest Brisbane player to ever play in a grand final, until Levi Ashcroft (18y 283d) broke the record in the 2025 AFL Grand Final. Morris won a second premiership in 2025 and also finished the 2025 season as the leading goalkicker for the Lions, kicking 53 goals.

Morris's 2026 season saw him finish runner-up in the Coleman Medal, kicking 63 goals in the home-and-away season, finishing just behind Charlie Curnow, who accrued 69. Morris was selected in the 46-man All-Australian squad for the 2026 season, his first career nomination. He won his third premiership in 2026; he kicked three of Brisbane's five final-quarter goals in the 7-point grand final win against Fremantle, including the go-ahead goal from a set shot with just over a minute remaining, and the sealer from a snap inside the final fifteen seconds.

== Statistics ==
Updated to the end of the 2026 season.

Legend
G	Goals	K	Kicks	D	Disposals	T	Tackles
B	Behinds	H	Handballs	M	Marks
#	Played in that season's premiership team

Season	Team	No.	Games	Totals							Averages (per game)							Votes
Season	Team	No.	Games	G	B	K	H	D	M	T	G	B	K	H	D	M	T	Votes
2024^{#}	Brisbane Lions	13	19	24	15	113	42	155	66	12	1.3	0.8	5.9	2.2	8.2	3.5	0.6	0
2025^{#}	Brisbane Lions	13	26	53	20	175	70	245	105	45	2.0	0.8	6.7	2.7	9.4	4.0	1.7	3
2026^{#}	Brisbane Lions	13	26	72	47	228	70	298	125	39	2.8	1.8	8.8	2.7	11.5	4.8	1.5	9
Career			71	149	82	516	182	698	296	96	2.1	1.2	7.3	2.6	9.8	4.2	1.4	12

== Honours and achievements ==
Team

- 3× AFL premiership player: 2024, 2025, 2026
- McClelland Trophy/Club Championship: 2025

Individual

- All-Australian team: 2026
- Marcus Ashcroft Medal: Round 13, 2026
- Brisbane Lions leading goalkicker: 2025
- AFL Rising Star nominee: 2024
- 2x 22under22 team: 2025, 2026
