= David Shaw (Australian footballer) =

Australian rules footballer

Personal information
- Born: 29 October 1938 (age 88); Ballarat
- Original team: University Blues (VAFA)
- Height: 183 cm (6 ft 0 in)
- Weight: 79 kg (174 lb)

Playing career^{1}
Years	Club	Games (Goals)
1959–1968	Essendon	177 (55)
- ^{1} Playing statistics correct to the end of 1968.

David Shaw (born 29 October 1938, in Ballarat) is a former Australian rules footballer who played for the Essendon in the VFL, mainly during the 1960s.

University Blues recruit David Shaw was a versatile player and made his senior debut in 1959. He played in four Grand Finals with Essendon over the course of his career, winning in 1962 and 1965 and losing in 1959 and 1968.

Shaw remained actively involved with the Essendon Football Club after his playing days were over, serving on their committee and was club president from 1993 to 1996.

He is the maternal grandfather of current AFL player Sam Darcy.
