= George Wardlaw =

Australian footballer

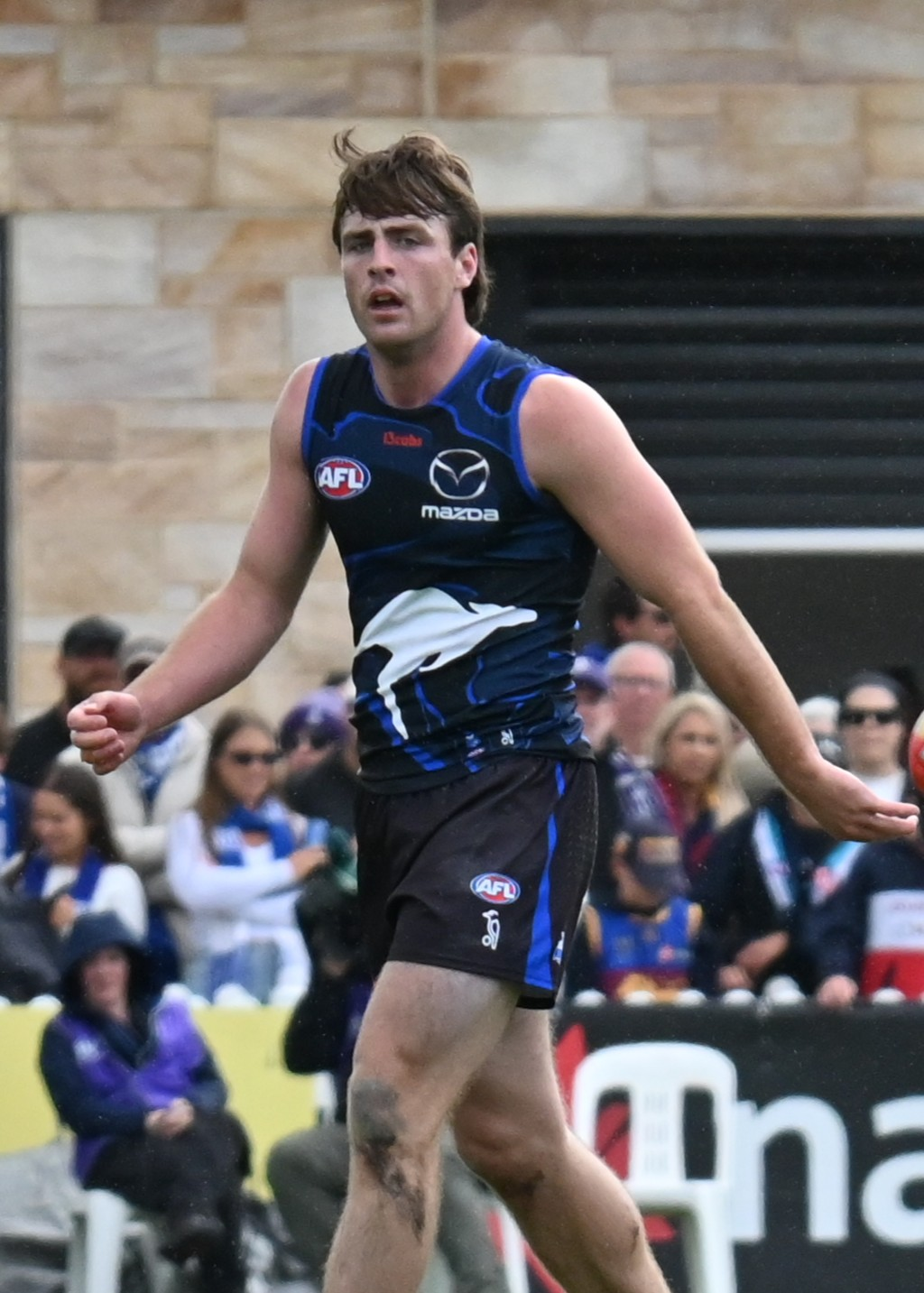
- Wardlaw in April 2026

Personal information
- Full name: George Anthony Wardlaw
- Nicknames: Warlord, Georgie
- Born: 11 June 2004 (age 22)
- Original team: Oakleigh Chargers
- Draft: No. 4, 2022 AFL draft
- Height: 182 cm (6 ft 0 in)
- Weight: 80 kg (176 lb)
- Position: Midfielder

Club information
- Current club: North Melbourne
- Number: 6

Playing career^{1}
Years	Club	Games (Goals)
2023–	North Melbourne	53 (18)
- ^{1} Playing statistics correct to the end of round 22, 2026.

Career highlights
- 22under22 team: 2024; 2× AFL Rising Star nominee: 2023, 2024

George Anthony Wardlaw (born 11 June 2004) is a professional Australian rules footballer who was drafted to play for North Melbourne in the Australian Football League (AFL) in the 2022 draft.

== Early life ==
Wardlaw completed his secondary education at St Kevin's College in Toorak. He was selected for Vic Metro in the NAB AFL Under 18 Championships and played for Oakleigh Chargers in the NAB League. Despite several injuries to his hamstring in the 2022 year, he was still considered to be among the top prospects in the 2022 AFL draft.

As a midfielder he has been described as 'powerful' and drawn comparisons to Melbourne Demons star Clayton Oliver.

Wardlaw attracted favourable attention from the AFL community after his performance for the Australian Academy team against the Collingwood Magpies VFL side where he won the 'best on ground' award for his team with 18 disposals and 8 tackles.

He is a close friend of fellow 2022 draftee Elijah Tsatas, with the pair having played together since the age of 11 for various Vic Metro teams.

Wardlaw grew up supporting the Essendon Bombers. He first played junior football for St Peter’s Football Club in the South Metro Junior Football League.

== AFL career ==
Wardlaw was highly rated by recruiters and deemed likely to be selected in the first 5 picks of the 2022 AFL draft. He was then selected by the North Melbourne Football Club using pick number 4. Wardlaw made his debut in round 10 of the 2023 AFL season, and received a rising star nomination three weeks later in round 13 against the Greater Western Sydney Giants. In round 2 of the 2024 season, Wardlaw became just the 18th player to earn his second AFL Rising Star nomination.

Wardlaw has suffered several injuries that caused him to miss games, including pre-draft injuries that led to a late round-10 debut in 2023, missing 3 weeks due to a round 18 hamstring strain in July 2023, concussions in June 2024, July 2024, and June 2025, a high-grade hamstring strain in January 2025, and two separate hamstring strains in early and then late February 2026.

Wardlaw returned to the team for Round 2 of the 2026 season after recovering from this hamstring strain. He suffered a further hamstring injury in round 17, 2026 against Port Adelaide. He signed a contract extension in 2026, until the end of the 2028 season.

== Statistics ==
Updated to the end of round 22, 2026.

Legend
G	Goals	K	Kicks	D	Disposals	T	Tackles
B	Behinds	H	Handballs	M	Marks

Season	Team	No.	Games	Totals							Averages (per game)							Votes
Season	Team	No.	Games	G	B	K	H	D	M	T	G	B	K	H	D	M	T	Votes
2023	North Melbourne	6	8	1	1	58	59	117	18	46	0.1	0.1	7.3	7.4	14.6	2.3	5.8	2
2024	North Melbourne	6	18	7	6	203	141	344	60	78	0.4	0.3	11.3	7.8	19.1	3.3	4.3	2
2025	North Melbourne	6	13	4	2	128	74	202	21	70	0.3	0.2	9.8	5.7	15.5	1.6	5.4	0
2026	North Melbourne	6	14	6	2	126	112	238	34	73	0.4	0.1	9.0	8.0	17.0	2.4	5.2	0
Career			53	18	11	515	386	901	133	267	0.3	0.2	9.7	7.3	17.0	2.5	5.0	4
