= Lawson Humphries =

Australian rules footballer

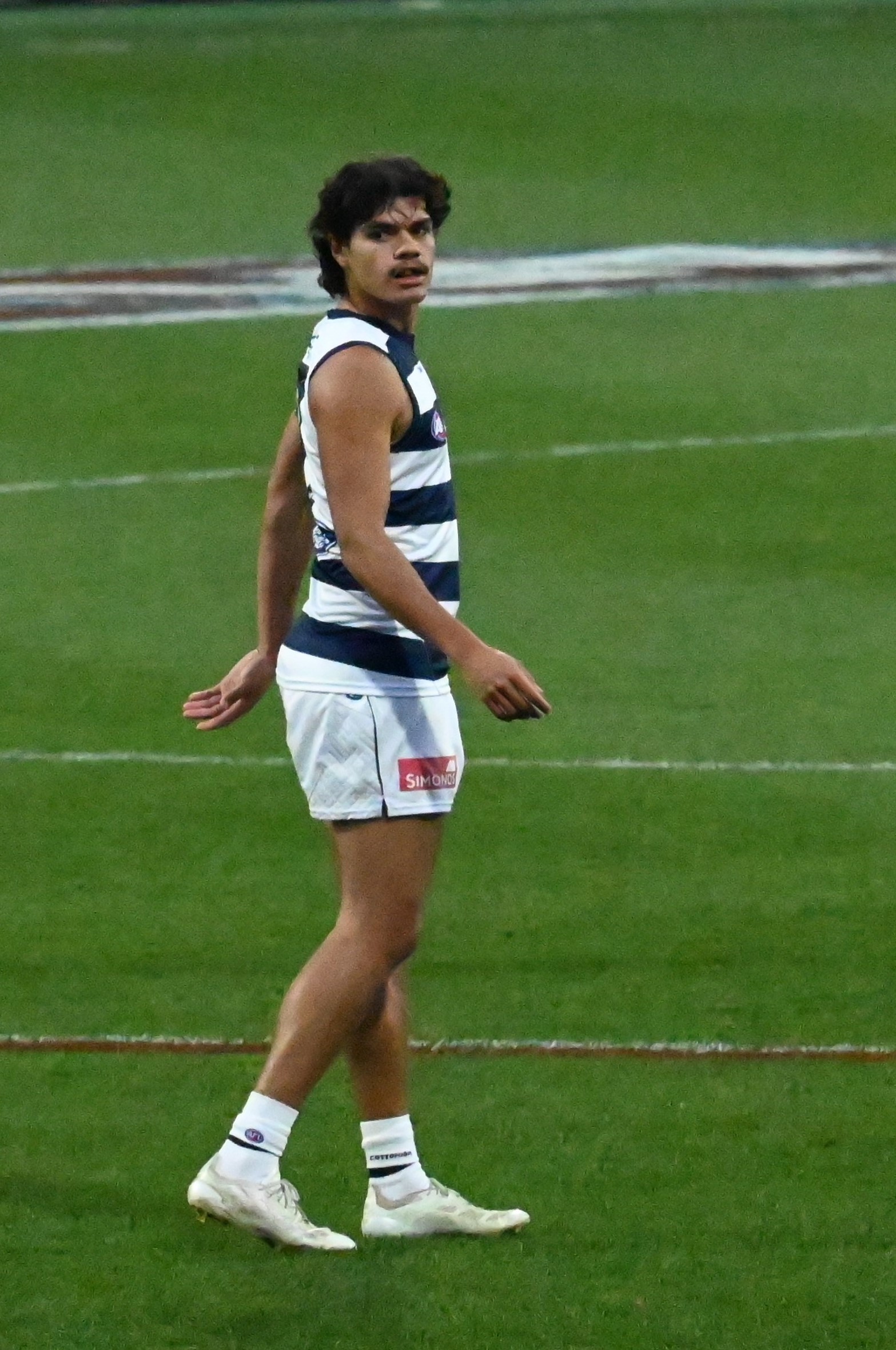
- Humphries in 2024

Personal information
- Born: 24 February 2003 (age 23)
- Original team: Wickham Wolves/Swan Districts/Hale School
- Draft: No. 63, 2023 AFL draft
- Debut: Round 16, 2024, Geelong vs. Essendon, at Melbourne Cricket Ground
- Height: 182 cm (6 ft 0 in)
- Weight: 79 kg (174 lb)
- Position: Defender

Club information
- Current club: Geelong
- Number: 17

Playing career^{1}
Years	Club	Games (Goals)
2024–	Geelong	60 (10)

Representative team honours
Years	Team	Games (Goals)
2025	Indigenous All-Stars	1 (0)
2026	Western Australia	1 (0)
- ^{1} Playing statistics correct to the end of 2026.

Career highlights
- AFL Rising Star nomination: 2024

Lawson Humphries (born 24 April 2003) is a professional Australian rules footballer who plays for the Geelong Football Club in the Australian Football League (AFL).

== Early career ==
Humphries is of Indigenous Australian heritage and grew up across northern Australia. He is Nyul Nyul, Oomiday and Worrora.

He started playing football in the Pilbara for the Wickham Wolves. Moving to Perth to attend boarding school at Hale and be part of the West Coast next generation academy, he played in Swan Districts West Australian Football League (WAFL) colts premiership in 2021, and in the club's 2023 WAFL reserves premiership victory, before entering the AFL draft for a third time. He was awarded Swan District's 2023 reserves best and fairest.

== AFL career ==
Drafted by Geelong in the 2023 AFL draft, Humphries started the 2024 season with the club's Victorian Football League (VFL) team. After a strong game against Sydney in June, he made his AFL debut for Geelong in round 16 of the 2024 AFL season against Essendon.

He received a Rising Star nomination after round 18 of the 2024 season.

== Personal life ==
Humphries is studying anthropology and sociology at Curtin University.

== Statistics ==
Updated to the end of round 22, 2026.

Legend
G	Goals	K	Kicks	D	Disposals	T	Tackles
B	Behinds	H	Handballs	M	Marks

Season	Team	No.	Games	Totals							Averages (per game)							Votes
Season	Team	No.	Games	G	B	K	H	D	M	T	G	B	K	H	D	M	T	Votes
2024	Geelong	17	11	1	1	137	50	187	65	19	0.1	0.1	12.5	4.5	17.0	5.9	1.7	0
2025	Geelong	17	25	4	2	310	94	404	134	50	0.2	0.1	12.4	3.8	16.2	5.4	2.0	0
2026	Geelong	17	24	5	3	349	138	487	135	50	0.2	0.2	14.5	5.8	20.3	5.6	2.1	2
Career			60	10	6	796	282	1078	334	119	0.2	0.1	13.1	4.7	17.8	5.6	1.9	2
