= Kai Lohmann =

Australian Rules footballer

Personal information
- Nickname: Grug
- Born: 6 May 2003 (age 23)
- Original teams: Greater Western Victoria Rebels (Talent League); Lake Wendouree (Ballarat Football League)
- Draft: No. 20, 2021 national draft
- Debut: Round 5, 2022, Brisbane Lions vs. Collingwood, at The Gabba
- Height: 185 cm (6 ft 1 in)
- Weight: 77 kg (170 lb)
- Position: Forward

Club information
- Current club: Brisbane Lions
- Number: 1

Playing career^{1}
Years	Club	Games (Goals)
2022–	Brisbane Lions	79 (110)
- ^{1} Playing statistics correct to the end of round 24, 2026.

Career highlights
- 3× AFL premiership player: 2024, 2025, 2026; Rising Star nomination: round 10, 2024

Kai Lohmann (born 6 May 2003) is an Australian rules footballer who plays for the Brisbane Lions in the Australian Football League (AFL).

== Early life ==
Originally from Maryborough, Victoria, he played junior football for the Maryborough Football Club before moving to Ballarat to play for Lake Wendouree in the Ballarat Football League and the Greater Western Victoria Rebels in the Talent League. He also represented Vic Country in the AFL National Under 18 Championships. Lohmann was selected by the Lions with pick 20 in the 2021 national draft.

== AFL career ==
=== 2022–2023: Early years ===
Lohmann made his debut in Round 5 of the 2022 season against Collingwood. Despite only playing 8 games in his first two seasons with the Lions, Lohmann signed a two-year contract extension with the team in September 2023, despite Essendon showing interest in signing him.

=== 2024–: Breaking out, premiership glory ===
Lohmann played every game of the 2024 season. His standout performance in the regular season being a round 10 game against eventual wooden-spooners Richmond, in a 119-point home victory, Lohmann kicked 5 goals and collected 14 disposals. He earned a Rising Star nomination.

Lohmann was an integral part of the Brisbane Lions 2024 premiership campaign, kicking 4 goals in the Grand Final against the Sydney Swans. He was one of four players to receive votes for the Norm Smith Medal. Lohmann kicked a total of nine goals in Brisbane's drought-breaking finals series. Along with ten teammates, Lohmann became just the second player to play 27 games in a single AFL season.

In round one of the 2025 season, Lohmann suffered an ankle injury in the Grand Final rematch against the Sydney Swans and was subbed out. He remained in and out of the first team throughout the start of the year due to constant setbacks on his aforementioned ankle injury as well as a shoulder issue. In a round 12 match against Essendon, Lohmann showed signs of returning to his 2024 form with three goals and one from outside 50. After Brisbane's underdog round 15 win over Geelong, Lohmann made headlines for waving goodbye to the crowd after kicking his second goal, putting the Lions up 35 points with two minutes remaining in the game. Before the Lions' semi-final clash against the Gold Coast Suns, Lohmann once again made headlines for shaving his long, blond hair down to the skin. He scored three goals in the Lions' 53-point victory.

== Statistics ==
Updated to the end of round 22, 2026.

Legend
G	Goals	K	Kicks	D	Disposals	T	Tackles
B	Behinds	H	Handballs	M	Marks
#	Played in that season's premiership team

Season	Team	No.	Games	Totals							Averages (per game)							Votes
Season	Team	No.	Games	G	B	K	H	D	M	T	G	B	K	H	D	M	T	Votes
2022	Brisbane Lions	1	2	0	1	6	7	13	1	8	0.0	0.5	3.0	3.5	6.5	0.5	4.0	0
2023	Brisbane Lions	1	6	1	4	24	18	42	11	11	0.2	0.7	4.0	3.0	7.0	1.8	1.8	0
2024^{#}	Brisbane Lions	1	27	36	28	198	114	312	105	80	1.3	1.0	7.3	4.2	11.6	3.9	3.0	1
2025^{#}	Brisbane Lions	1	18	20	11	112	71	183	54	49	1.1	0.6	6.2	3.9	10.2	3.0	2.7	0
2026^{#}	Brisbane Lions	1	21	46	22	168	98	266	81	62	2.2	1.0	8.0	4.7	12.7	3.9	3.0	0
Career			74	103	66	508	308	816	252	210	1.4	0.9	6.9	4.2	11.0	3.4	2.8	1
