= Logan Evans (footballer) =

Australian rules footballer (born 2005)

Personal information
- Full name: Logan Evans
- Born: 7 October 2005 (age 21); South Australia
- Original team: Norwood
- Draft: No. 12, 2024 mid-season draft
- Debut: Round 16, 2024, Port Adelaide vs. Brisbane Lions, at Adelaide Oval
- Height: 189 cm (6 ft 2 in)
- Weight: 80 kg (176 lb)
- Position: Defender

Club information
- Current club: Port Adelaide
- Number: 22

Playing career^{1}
Years	Club	Games (Goals)
2024–	Port Adelaide	42 (5)
- ^{1} Playing statistics correct to the end of round 22, 2026.

Career highlights
- AFL Rising Star nominee (2024)

Logan Evans (born 7 October 2005) is a professional Australian rules footballer playing for the Port Adelaide Football Club in the Australian Football League (AFL).

Evans was drafted in the first round at pick #12 in the 2024 mid-season rookie draft. He made his debut in round 15, and received a Rising Star nomination after Round 24.

== Statistics ==
Updated to the end of round 22, 2026.

Legend
G	Goals	K	Kicks	D	Disposals	T	Tackles
B	Behinds	H	Handballs	M	Marks

Season	Team	No.	Games	Totals							Averages (per game)							Votes
Season	Team	No.	Games	G	B	K	H	D	M	T	G	B	K	H	D	M	T	Votes
2024	Port Adelaide	43	13	2	2	160	44	204	71	21	0.2	0.2	12.3	3.4	15.7	5.5	1.6	0
2025	Port Adelaide	22	10	1	0	78	51	129	28	18	0.1	0.0	7.8	5.1	12.9	2.8	1.8	0
2026	Port Adelaide	22	19	2	0	247	85	332	107	40	0.1	0.0	13.0	4.5	17.5	5.6	2.1	0
Career			42	5	2	485	180	665	206	79	0.1	0.0	11.5	4.3	15.8	4.9	1.9	0
