= Sam Darcy (footballer) =

Australian rules football player (born 2003)

Personal information
- Full name: Sam Darcy
- Born: 19 July 2003 (age 23)
- Original team: Oakleigh Chargers (Talent League)/Scotch College (APS)
- Draft: No. 2, 2021 AFL draft
- Height: 208 cm (6 ft 10 in)
- Position: Key Forward

Club information
- Current club: Western Bulldogs
- Number: 10

Playing career^{1}
Years	Club	Games (Goals)
2022–	Western Bulldogs	51 (101)

Representative team honours^{2}
Years	Team	Games (Goals)
2026	Victoria	1 (0)
- ^{1} Playing statistics correct to the end of round 22, 2026.^{2} Representative statistics correct as of 2026.

Career highlights
- AFL Rising Star nominee: 2024; 22under22 team: 2024; Mark of the Year: 2025

Sam Darcy (born 19 July 2003) is a professional Australian rules footballer playing for the Western Bulldogs in the Australian Football League (AFL)

== Early life ==
Darcy grew up in Melbourne’s inner eastern suburbs and studied at Scotch College. The 205 cm player scored six goals in an U19s trial match, continuing his excellent play throughout Vic Metro matches. In his 3 NAB League games, Darcy averaged 16 touches, 6 marks, and 6 hit-outs. He was drafted at pick number 2 in the 2021 AFL draft under the father–son rule. His father, Luke Darcy, and grandfather David Darcy both played for the Bulldogs. His maternal grandfather David Shaw played for Essendon. He played junior football for Hawthorn Citizens and Glen Iris Gladiators in the Yarra Junior Football League.

== AFL career ==
Darcy received a Rising Star nomination after Round 4 of the 2024 season.

In round six, 2026, Darcy suffered a season-ending anterior cruciate ligament injury in the Western Bulldogs' 75-point loss to Geelong at GMHBA Stadium. His father, Luke, had suffered the same injury in 2005, coincidentally in round six against Geelong at (what was then known as) Skilled Stadium.

== Statistics ==
Updated to the end of round 22, 2026.

Legend
G	Goals	K	Kicks	D	Disposals	T	Tackles
B	Behinds	H	Handballs	M	Marks

Season	Team	No.	Games	Totals							Averages (per game)							Votes
Season	Team	No.	Games	G	B	K	H	D	M	T	G	B	K	H	D	M	T	Votes
2022	Western Bulldogs	10	4	3	3	35	11	46	24	3	0.8	0.8	8.8	2.8	11.5	6.0	0.8	0
2023	Western Bulldogs	10	3	0	2	7	3	10	2	8	0.0	0.7	2.3	1.0	3.3	0.7	2.7	0
2024	Western Bulldogs	10	21	38	23	163	100	263	102	60	1.8	1.1	7.8	4.8	12.5	4.9	2.9	3
2025	Western Bulldogs	10	17	48	21	157	85	242	102	26	2.8	1.2	9.2	5.0	14.2	6.0	1.5	6
2026	Western Bulldogs	10	6	12	9	44	25	69	21	11	2.0	1.5	7.3	4.2	11.5	3.5	1.8	0
Career			51	101	58	406	224	630	251	108	2.0	1.1	8.0	4.4	12.4	4.9	2.1	9

== Honours and achievements ==
Individual

- AFL Rising Star nominee: 2024
- 22under22 team: 2024
- Mark of the Year: 2025
