= Matt Roberts (footballer) =

Australian rules footballer

Matthew Roberts
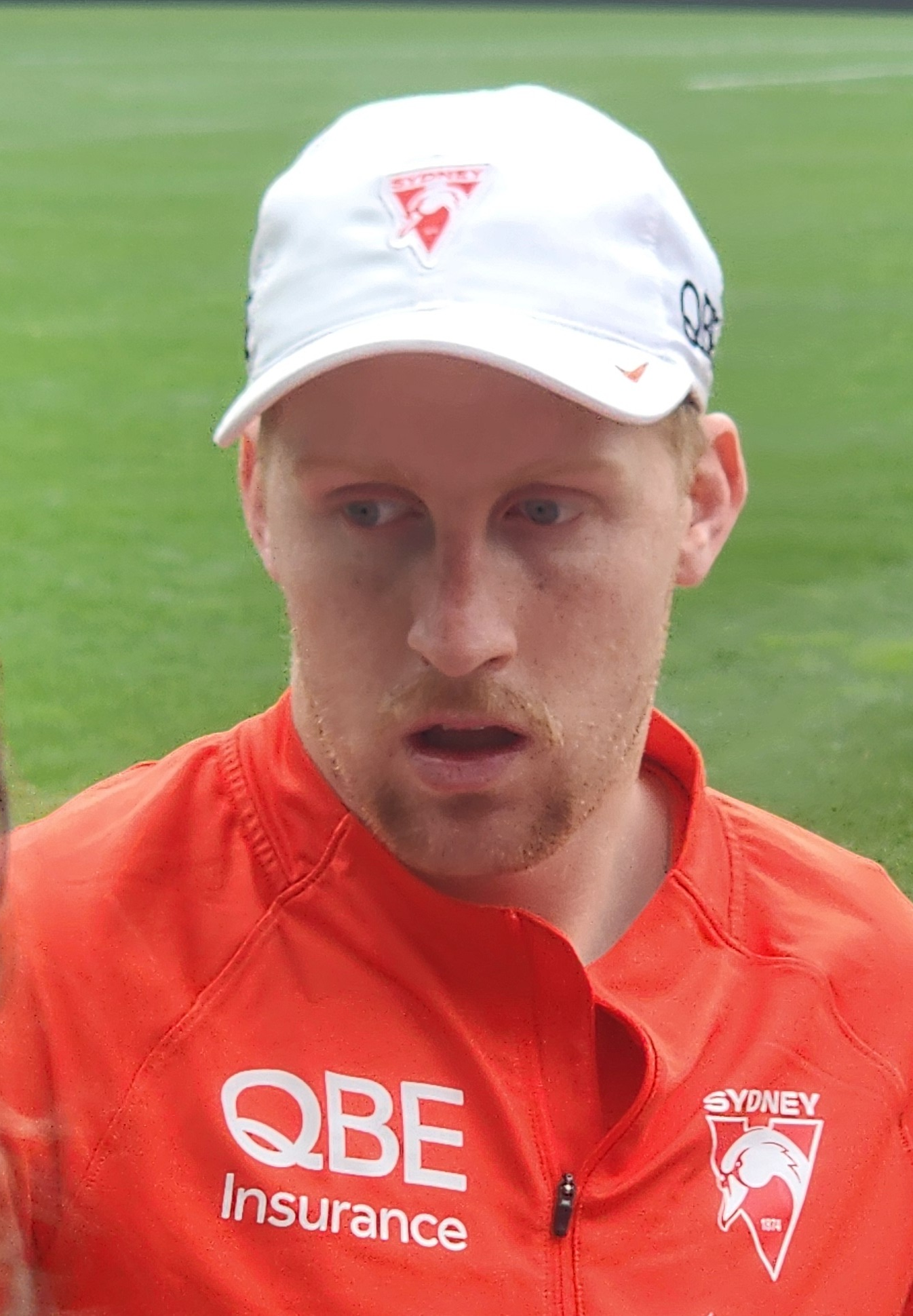
- Roberts in 2026

Personal information
- Nickname: Robbo
- Born: 31 July 2003 (age 23); Langhorne Creek, South Australia
- Draft: Round 2, Pick #34 2021 AFL National Draft
- Debut: Round 11, 2022, Sydney vs. Richmond, at Sydney Cricket Ground
- Height: 184 cm (6 ft 0 in)
- Weight: 81 kg (179 lb)
- Position: Medium Defender

Club information
- Current club: Sydney
- Number: 34

Playing career^{1}
Years	Club	Games (Goals)
2022–	Sydney	65 (7)
- ^{1} Playing statistics correct to the end of round 22, 2026.

Career highlights
- 2024 AFL Rising Star nominee

Matthew Roberts (born 31 July 2003) is an Australian rules footballer who plays for the Sydney Swans in the Australian Football League (AFL).

== Early football ==
Growing up, Roberts honed his football skills on the fields of Langhorne Creek Football Club, where his passion for the game ignited. This grassroots experience laid the foundation for his journey in the sport. Transitioning to his school years, he showcased his talent donning the colors of St Peter's College, Adelaide.

Roberts then joined the South Adelaide Football Club and also represented South Australia at consecutive Under 16 National Championships and then consecutive Under 18 Championships.

== AFL career ==
After being drafted with the 34th selection in the 2021 AFL draft. A year after being drafted, Roberts made his debut for Sydney Swans in Round 11, 2022 following a successful spell in the VFL.

In the 2023 AFL season, Roberts would go on to play 6 games adjusting to the heightened competition and establishing his place in a roster full of talent.

Roberts played the first nine games of the 2024 season, and has been a breakout player which has seen his disposals soar at an average of 18.6 per game. He was nominated for the 2024 AFL Rising Star in the opening round of the season.

== Statistics ==
Updated to the end of round 22, 2026.

Legend
G	Goals	K	Kicks	D	Disposals	T	Tackles
B	Behinds	H	Handballs	M	Marks

Season	Team	No.	Games	Totals							Averages (per game)							Votes
Season	Team	No.	Games	G	B	K	H	D	M	T	G	B	K	H	D	M	T	Votes
2022	Sydney	34	1	0	0	1	1	2	0	1	0.0	0.0	1.0	1.0	2.0	0.0	1.0	0
2023	Sydney	34	6	1	1	28	13	41	12	9	0.2	0.2	4.7	2.2	6.8	2.0	1.5	0
2024	Sydney	34	23	2	2	297	125	422	130	51	0.1	0.1	12.9	5.4	18.3	5.7	2.2	3
2025	Sydney	34	18	1	3	263	119	382	108	36	0.1	0.2	14.6	6.6	21.2	6.0	2.0	0
2026	Sydney	34	17	3	7	171	130	301	73	36	0.2	0.4	10.1	7.6	17.7	4.3	2.1	0
Career			65	7	13	760	388	1148	323	133	0.1	0.2	11.7	6.0	17.7	5.0	2.0	3
