= Jarman Impey =

Australian rules footballer

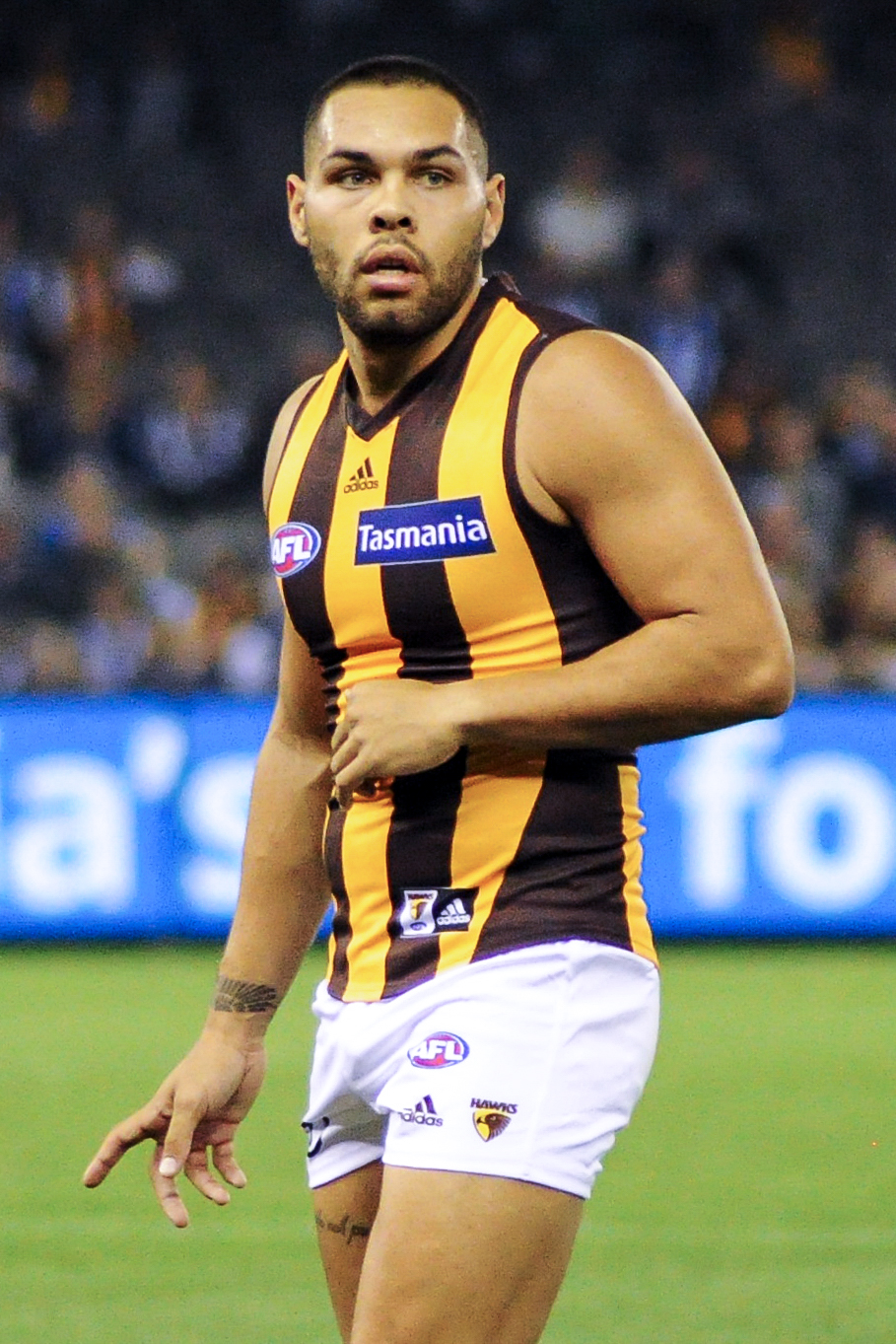
- Impey playing for Hawthorn in April 2018

Personal information
- Full name: Jarman Impey
- Born: 9 July 1995 (age 31)
- Original team: Murray Bushrangers (TAC Cup)
- Draft: No. 21, 2013 national draft
- Debut: Round 1, 2014, Port Adelaide vs. Carlton, at Etihad Stadium
- Height: 178 cm (5 ft 10 in)
- Weight: 79 kg (174 lb)
- Position: Defender

Club information
- Current club: Hawthorn
- Number: 4

Playing career^{1}
Years	Club	Games (Goals)
2014–2017	Port Adelaide	75 (34)
2018–	Hawthorn	169 (39)
Total		244 (73)

Representative team honours
Years	Team	Games (Goals)
2015–2025	Indigenous All-Stars	2 (0)
- ^{1} Playing statistics correct to the end of 2026.

Career highlights
- All-Australian team: 2026

Jarman Impey (born 9 July 1995) is a professional Australian rules footballer playing for the Hawthorn Football Club in the Australian Football League (AFL). He previously played for the Port Adelaide Football Club from 2014 to 2017.

== Early life ==
Of Yorta Yorta indigenous descent, Impey spent his childhood in Shepparton, Victoria. He played his junior football with the Shepparton Bears and the Shepparton Swans before selection in the Murray Bushrangers TAC Cup team and Victoria Country at the 2013 AFL Under 18 Championships.

== AFL career ==
Impey was drafted by Port Adelaide with their first selection, pick 21, in the 2013 AFL draft. He made his AFL debut against Carlton in the first round of the 2014 season. Since making his debut, Impey has been used a back pocket shutdown roll on small forwards. Impey has had mixed results but has been successful against the likes of Hayden Ballantyne, Eddie Betts and Jay Kennedy Harris. In round 8, 2014, Impey was the Rising Star nominee for his defensive performance against Fremantle's Ballantyne.

The start of Impey's 2015 season was curtailed by a hamstring injury; however, he only missed one game after returning from injury in round 7. His development into a small lockdown defender continued for the rest of the season, and in the round 12 match against Carlton he recorded a career-high 23 disposals and a season-high four inside-50s.

2016 saw Impey move into Port Adelaide's forward line, where he excelled as a small forward with a series of elite performances, including three goals against Richmond to lead the Power to victory. He capped off his first season in the forward line by winning the Gavin Wanganeen Medal as Port Adelaide's best player under 21.

Impey was suspended by the club for an off-field indiscretion during the summer break and missed round 1 of the 2017 season but bounced back with a handy contribution of 19 disposals and one goal in round 2 against Fremantle. The round 6 match against the Brisbane Lions saw Impey kick a career-high four goals.

During the 2017 trade period, Impey was traded to the Hawthorn Football Club.

On July 21, 2019, Impey suffered an Anterior cruciate ligament injury against Geelong, ending his season.

In 2026, Impey had a career-best season, and was named in the 2026 All-Australian team. However, the Hawks' season ended in the preliminary final against Brisbane Lions, because of a goal conceded in the final minute due to Impey being penalised for holding the ball deep in defence; Impey had received a handball and failed to attempt a disposal after being tackled by Hugh McCluggage with his ball-carrying arm free.

== Statistics ==
Updated to the end of 2026.

Legend
G	Goals	K	Kicks	D	Disposals	T	Tackles
B	Behinds	H	Handballs	M	Marks

Season	Team	No.	Games	Totals							Averages (per game)							Votes
Season	Team	No.	Games	G	B	K	H	D	M	T	G	B	K	H	D	M	T	Votes
2014	Port Adelaide	24	18	3	2	121	79	200	50	46	0.2	0.1	6.7	4.4	11.1	2.8	2.6	0
2015	Port Adelaide	24	17	1	4	108	106	214	55	51	0.1	0.2	6.4	6.2	12.6	3.2	3.0	0
2016	Port Adelaide	24	20	15	10	137	105	242	58	77	0.8	0.5	6.9	5.3	12.1	2.9	3.9	3
2017	Port Adelaide	24	20	15	14	158	80	238	60	62	0.8	0.7	7.9	4.0	11.9	3.0	3.1	0
2018	Hawthorn	4	24	10	10	268	125	393	84	81	0.4	0.4	11.2	5.2	16.4	3.5	3.4	0
2019	Hawthorn	4	17	7	3	184	97	281	83	47	0.4	0.2	10.8	5.7	16.5	4.9	2.8	1
2020 (Note: The 2020 season was played with 17 home-and-away matches per team (down from 22) and 16-minute quarters with time on (down from 20-minute quarters with time on) due to the impact of the COVID-19 pandemic.)	Hawthorn	4	5	2	3	22	24	46	13	9	0.4	0.6	4.4	4.8	9.2	2.6	1.8	0
2021	Hawthorn	4	13	2	0	181	107	288	70	33	0.2	0.0	13.9	8.2	22.2	5.4	2.5	0
2022	Hawthorn	4	16	3	8	158	92	250	61	38	0.2	0.5	9.9	5.8	15.6	3.8	2.4	0
2023	Hawthorn	4	22	3	4	299	162	461	120	48	0.1	0.2	13.6	7.4	21.0	5.5	2.2	0
2024	Hawthorn	4	25	2	4	316	155	471	139	61	0.1	0.2	12.6	6.2	18.8	5.6	2.4	1
2025	Hawthorn	4	24	5	8	306	157	463	119	62	0.2	0.3	12.8	6.5	19.3	5.0	2.6	5
2026	Hawthorn	4	23	5	4	344	173	517	152	36	0.2	0.2	15.0	7.5	22.5	6.6	1.6	5
Career			241	73	74	2602	1462	4064	1064	651	0.3	0.3	10.7	6.0	16.7	4.4	2.7	15

== Honours and achievements ==
Team

- McClelland Trophy (Hawthorn): 2024

Individual

- All-Australian team: 2026
- Gavin Wanganeen Medal: 2016
- AFL Rising Star nominee: 2014
- 2× Indigenous All-Stars team: 2015, 2025
