= Darcy Jones =

Australian rules footballer

Personal information
- Full name: Darcy Jones
- Nickname: The Kid with the Lid
- Born: 3 April 2004 (age 22)
- Original teams: Kalamunda & Districts Junior Football Club/Swan Districts (WAFL)
- Draft: No. 21, 2022 national draft: Greater Western Sydney
- Debut: Round 7, 2024, Greater Western Sydney vs. Brisbane Lions, at Manuka Oval
- Height: 175 cm (5 ft 9 in)
- Weight: 67 kg (148 lb)
- Position: Forward

Club information
- Current club: Greater Western Sydney
- Number: 2

Playing career^{1}
Years	Club	Games (Goals)
2023–	Greater Western Sydney	37 (31)
- ^{1} Playing statistics correct to the end of the 2025 season: AFL Rising Star nominee: 2024.

Darcy Jones (born 3 April 2004) is a professional Australian rules footballer for the Greater Western Sydney Giants in the Australian Football League (AFL).

== AFL career ==
Jones was recruited by Greater Western Sydney with the 21st overall selection in the 2022 national draft. After a strong pre-season, Jones' debut year on the Giants' list was ended prematurely by a torn ACL suffered in the club's reserves side.

Jones debuted for GWS in round seven of the 2024 AFL season in a 54-point win against Brisbane Lions. On his debut he kicked 2 goals and had 15 disposals. Jones received a nomination for the 2024 AFL Rising Star in round 17 of the 2024 season, after kicking a goal and having 18 disposals against Carlton. Coming off a limited pre-season due to his knee injury in 2023, Jones played 14 AFL games and won the Giants' Rising Star award at the Kevin Sheedy Medal. Jones earned the nickname 'The Kid with the Lid' in 2024, a nod to the helmet he wears when playing.

The 2025 AFL season saw Jones secure a regular place in the Giants' side. He played 23 games as a speedy half-forward and signed a two-year contract extension with the club in May.

In the 2025 AFL final series, Jones suffered another torn ACL in the Giants' loss to Hawthorn, subsequently undergoing a second knee reconstruction. Despite being medically cleared to return to football by the late stages of the 2026 AFL season, Jones was ruled out of the remainder of the year in a decision made in conjunction with club and player, with an eye to ensuring Jones' fitness for 2027.

== Statistics ==
Updated to the end of the 2025 season.

Legend
G	Goals	K	Kicks	D	Disposals	T	Tackles
B	Behinds	H	Handballs	M	Marks

Season	Team	No.	Games	Totals							Averages (per game)							Votes
Season	Team	No.	Games	G	B	K	H	D	M	T	G	B	K	H	D	M	T	Votes
2023	Greater Western Sydney	2	0	—	—	—	—	—	—	—	—	—	—	—	—	—	—	0
2024	Greater Western Sydney	2	14	12	6	95	84	179	24	45	0.9	0.4	6.8	6.0	12.8	1.7	3.2	1
2025	Greater Western Sydney	2	23	19	14	168	156	324	46	78	0.8	0.6	7.3	6.8	14.1	2.0	3.4	0
Career			37	31	20	263	240	503	70	123	0.8	0.5	7.1	6.5	13.6	1.9	3.3	1
