= Daisy D'Arcy =

Australian rules football player

Personal information
- Full name: Daisy D'Arcy
- Born: 12 December 2002 (age 23)
- Original team: Hermit Park (AFL Townsville)
- Draft: No. 60, 2020 AFL Women's draft
- Height: 167 cm (5 ft 6 in)
- Position: Midfielder

Club information
- Current club: Gold Coast
- Number: 20

Playing career^{1}
Years	Club	Games (Goals)
2021–	Gold Coast	40 (1)
- ^{1} Playing statistics correct to the end of the 2023 season.

Career highlights
- 2x 22under22: 2023, 2024

Daisy D'Arcy (born 12 December 2002) is an Australian rules footballer playing for Gold Coast in the AFL Women's competition (AFLW).

== Early life ==
D'Arcy grew up in Townsville and attended The Cathedral School throughout her upbringing. Her first sporting interests were split between rugby and soccer but her mother forced her to begin playing Australian rules football for the first time in 2017. A talented junior athlete, she represented Queensland in Australian rules football, cricket, rugby sevens and soccer. In 2020, D'Arcy elected to pursue Australian football "because it is a bit of a mix of those other sports" and moved to the Gold Coast to take part in the Gold Coast Suns Academy program on a full-time basis.

== AFLW career ==
At 17 years of age, D'Arcy was drafted to the Gold Coast Suns with pick 60 in the 2020 AFL Women's draft. She became the youngest AFLW player at 18 years and 49 days when she debuted for the Suns in Round 1 of the 2021 AFLW season. It was revealed D'Arcy signed a two-year contract extension with Gold Coast on 10 June 2021.
