= 2026 All-Australian team =

Honorary Australian rules football team

The 2026 All-Australian team represents the best performed Australian Football League (AFL) players during the 2026 season. It was announced in August as a complete Australian rules football team of 23 players. The team is honorary and does not play any games.

== Selection panel ==
The selection panel for the 2026 All-Australian team consisted of chairman Andrew Dillon, Eddie Betts, Jude Bolton, Kane Cornes, Luke Hodge, Abbey Holmes, Glen Jakovich, David Mundy, Joel Selwood, Greg Swann, Matthew Pavlich and Laura Kane.

== Team ==
=== Initial squad ===
The initial 46-man All-Australian squad was announced on 24 August, with all clubs except Essendon, Richmond, and West Coast having at least one player nominated.

Due to their involvement in the ongoing sexual assault investigation, Sydney Swans players Isaac Heeney, Chad Warner, Nick Blakey, James Jordon, and Riley Bice were ruled ineligible for the squad by the AFL.

Fremantle had the most players selected in the initial squad with eight.

Club	Total	Player(s)
Adelaide	3	Jordan Dawson, Wayne Milera, Izak Rankine
Brisbane Lions	6	Harris Andrews, Will Ashcroft, Zac Bailey, Charlie Cameron, Logan Morris, Lachie Neale
Carlton	1	Patrick Cripps
Collingwood	2	Josh Daicos, Nick Daicos
Essendon	0	
Fremantle	8	Jye Amiss, Shai Bolton, Alex Pearce, Murphy Reid, Jordan Clark, Luke Jackson, Caleb Serong, Josh Treacy
Geelong	4	Oliver Dempsey, Max Holmes, Connor O'Sullivan, Bailey Smith
Gold Coast	2	Ben King, Bodhi Uwland
Greater Western Sydney	2	Lachie Ash, Clayton Oliver
Hawthorn	5	Jack Gunston, Jarman Impey, Jai Newcombe, James Sicily, Nick Watson
Melbourne	2	Max Gawn, Kysaiah Pickett
North Melbourne	1	Luke Davies-Uniacke
Port Adelaide	4	Aliir Aliir, Zak Butters, Mitch Georgiades, Jason Horne-Francis
Richmond	0	
St Kilda	2	Nasiah Wanganeen-Milera, Callum Wilkie
Sydney	2	Brodie Grundy, Charlie Curnow
West Coast	0	
Western Bulldogs	2	Marcus Bontempelli, Ed Richards

=== Final team ===
2026 All-Australian Team
B:	Wayne Milera (Adelaide)	Callum Wilkie (St Kilda)	Jarman Impey (Hawthorn)
HB:	Lachie Ash (Greater Western Sydney)	Harris Andrews (Brisbane Lions)	Jordan Clark (Fremantle)
C:	Bailey Smith (Geelong)	Marcus Bontempelli (Western Bulldogs)	Oliver Dempsey (Geelong)
HF:	Shai Bolton (Fremantle)	Josh Treacy (Fremantle)	Kysaiah Pickett (Melbourne)
F:	Nick Watson (Hawthorn)	Charlie Curnow (Sydney)	Logan Morris (Brisbane Lions)
Foll:	Max Gawn (Melbourne) (c)	Jordan Dawson (Adelaide) (vc)	Nick Daicos (Collingwood)
Int:	Luke Jackson (Fremantle)	Nasiah Wanganeen-Milera (St Kilda)	Murphy Reid (Fremantle)
Int:	Zac Bailey (Brisbane Lions)	Zak Butters (Port Adelaide)	
Coach:	Chris Fagan (Brisbane Lions)		

Note: the position of coach in the All-Australian team is traditionally awarded to the coach of the premiership team.
