= Ollie Dempsey =

Australian rules footballer (born 2003)

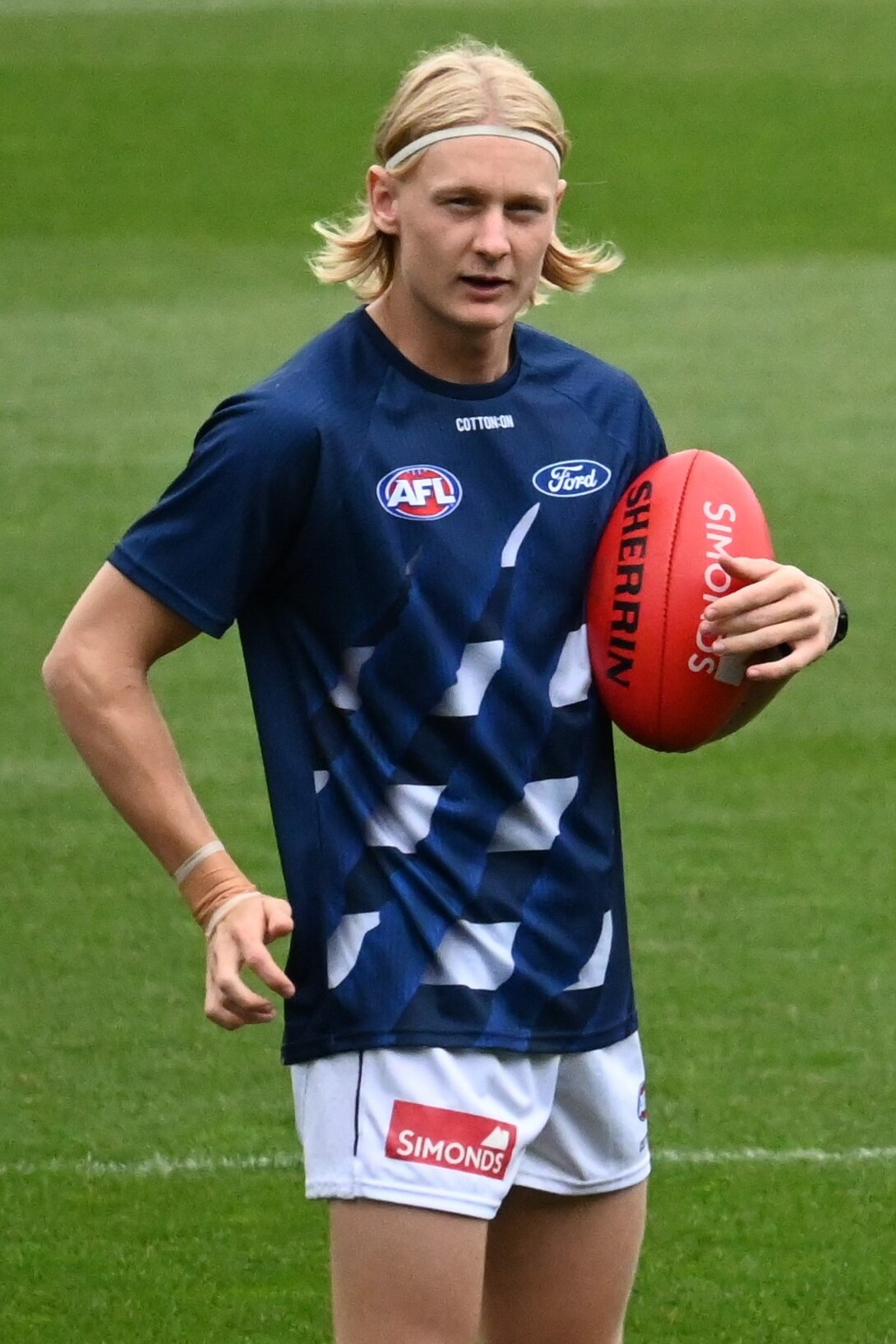
- Dempsey in 2024

Personal information
- Full name: Oliver Dempsey
- Born: 7 January 2003 (age 23)
- Original team: Old Carey / Carey Grammar
- Draft: No. 15, 2021 rookie draft
- Debut: Round 6, 2022, Geelong vs. West Coast, at GMHBA Stadium
- Height: 187 cm (6 ft 2 in)
- Weight: 74 kg (163 lb)
- Position: Wing

Club information
- Current club: Geelong
- Number: 28

Playing career^{1}
Years	Club	Games (Goals)
2022–	Geelong	83 (89)
- ^{1} Playing statistics correct to the end of 2026.

Career highlights
- Ron Evans Medal: 2024; All-Australian team: 2026; 2x 22under22 team: 2024, 2025; Tom Wills Award: 2024; AFL Rising Star nomination: 2024; Geelong best young player: 2024

Oliver Dempsey (born 7 January 2003) is an Australian rules footballer who plays for Geelong in the Australian Football League (AFL).

Geelong selected Dempsey with pick 15 in the 2022 rookie draft. Dempsey made his AFL debut in round 6 of the 2022 AFL season against North Melbourne. He won the AFL Rising Star award in 2024.

== Junior career ==
Originally playing point-guard in basketball which he represented his state in, Dempsey was scouted by the Cats while playing school football with Melbourne's Carey Baptist Grammar School during his final year of school in 2021. In his younger years he played community football for Hawthorn Citizens and Boroondara Hawks in the Yarra Junior Football League.

== AFL career ==
Dempsey made his debut in round 6 of the 2022 AFL season. In 2023, Dempsey played five senior AFL games and kicked one goal.

In round 1 of the 2024 AFL season Dempsey received a nomination for the Rising Star Award. He was named the winner of the AFL Rising Star in August 2024.

In 2026, Dempsey was named on the wing of the 2026 All-Australian team.

== Statistics ==
Updated to the end of round 22, 2026.

Legend
G	Goals	K	Kicks	D	Disposals	T	Tackles
B	Behinds	H	Handballs	M	Marks

Season	Team	No.	Games	Totals							Averages (per game)							Votes
Season	Team	No.	Games	G	B	K	H	D	M	T	G	B	K	H	D	M	T	Votes
2022	Geelong	28	2	1	1	5	14	19	0	2	0.5	0.5	2.5	7.0	9.5	0.0	1.0	0
2023	Geelong	28	5	1	3	16	22	38	8	10	0.2	0.6	3.2	4.4	7.6	1.6	2.0	0
2024	Geelong	28	25	22	13	231	205	436	109	61	0.9	0.5	9.2	8.2	17.4	4.4	2.4	3
2025	Geelong	28	26	35	20	248	193	441	100	73	1.3	0.8	9.5	7.4	17.0	3.8	2.8	0
2026	Geelong	28	21	28	10	201	204	405	103	36	1.3	0.5	9.6	9.7	19.3	4.9	1.7	6
Career			79	87	47	701	638	1339	320	182	1.1	0.6	8.9	8.1	16.9	4.1	2.3	9
