= Tarni Evans =

Australian rules footballer

Personal information
- Born: 1 February 2002 (age 24)
- Original teams: Queanbeyan (AFL Canberra); Tathra (NSW)
- Draft: No. 9, 2020 national draft
- Debut: 31 January 2021, Greater Western Sydney vs. Fremantle, at Fremantle Oval
- Height: 180 cm (5 ft 11 in)
- Position: Wing / Forward

Club information
- Current club: Greater Western Sydney
- Number: 18

Playing career^{1}
Years	Club	Games (Goals)
2021–	Greater Western Sydney	51 (23)
- ^{1} Playing statistics correct to the end of 2025.

Career highlights
- Greater Western Sydney leading goalkicker: 2025

Tarni Evans is an Australian rules footballer playing for the Greater Western Sydney Giants in the AFL Women's league. Evans was recruited by the Giants with the 9th pick in the 2020 AFL Women's draft.

== Early football ==
Evans played junior football for the Tathra Eaglettes and later the Queanbeyan Football Club. She spent two seasons in the AFLW Academy.

== AFLW career ==
Evans debuted for the Greater Western Sydney in the opening round of the 2021 AFL Women's season. On debut, Evans collected 9 disposals, 2 marks and a tackle. Tarni has moved between the backline, the forward line and even showing promise as an undersized ruck.

== Statistics ==
Statistics are correct to the end of the 2021 season.

Legend
G	Goals	K	Kicks	D	Disposals	T	Tackles
B	Behinds	H	Handballs	M	Marks

Season	Team	No.	Games	Totals							Averages (per game)							Votes
Season	Team	No.	Games	G	B	K	H	D	M	T	G	B	K	H	D	M	T	Votes
2021	Greater Western Sydney	18	7	0	0	40	20	60	11	12	0.0	0.0	5.7	2.9	8.6	1.6	1.7	0
Career			9	0	0	40	20	60	11	12	0.0	0.0	5.7	2.9	8.6	1.6	1.7	0
