= Colby McKercher =

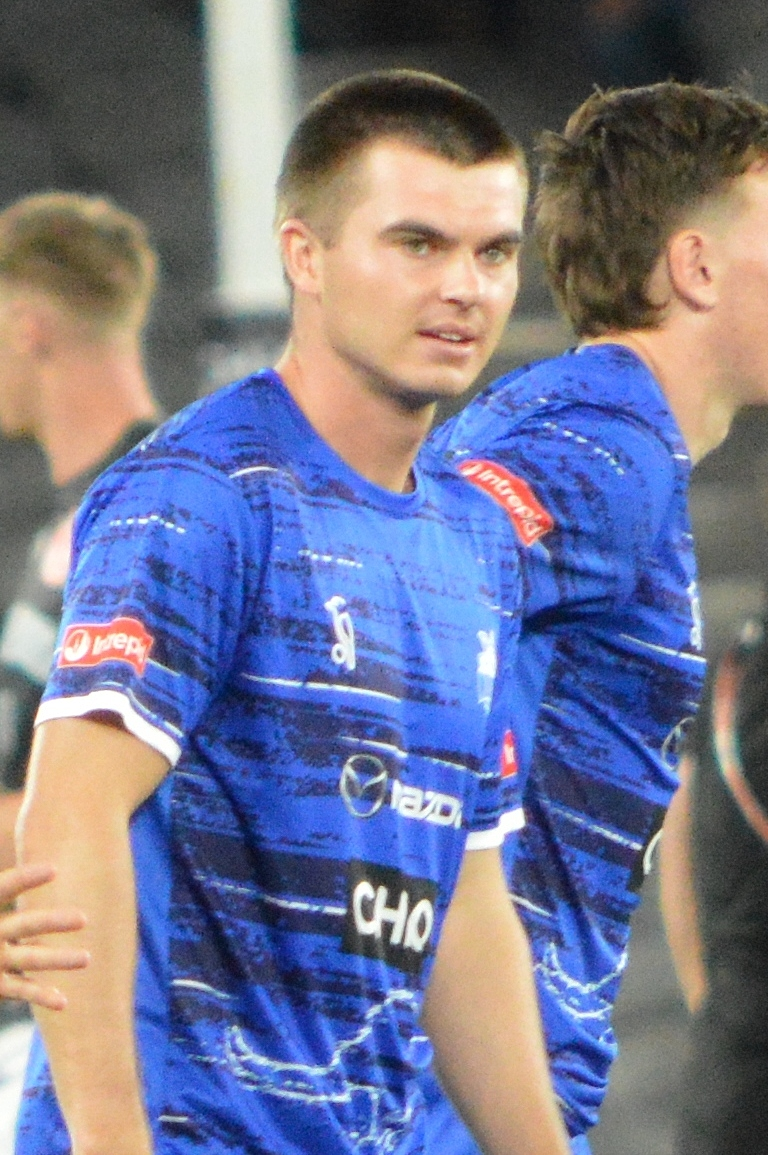
- McKercher in March 2026

Personal information
- Full name: Colby McKercher
- Nickname: Sonic
- Born: 12 April 2005 (age 21)
- Original teams: Launceston (TSL); Tasmania Devils (Talent League)
- Draft: No. 2, 2023 national draft
- Debut: Round 1, 2024, North Melbourne vs. Greater Western Sydney, at Sydney Showground Stadium
- Height: 182 cm (6 ft 0 in)
- Position: Defender

Club information
- Current club: North Melbourne
- Number: 10

Playing career^{1}
Years	Club	Games (Goals)
2024–	North Melbourne	60 (18)
- ^{1} Playing statistics correct to the end of round 22, 2026.

Career highlights
- Morrish Medal: 2023; Rising Star nominee: 2024

Colby McKercher is a professional Australian rules footballer who was selected by North Melbourne as the number two pick in the 2023 AFL draft.

He previously played for the Tasmania Devils in the Talent League.

== AFL career ==
After collecting 18 disposals in North Melbourne's only official pre-season game against St Kilda, McKercher made his official debut for North Melbourne in round one against Greater Western Sydney. On debut, McKercher collected 22 disposals and 8 marks in 39-point loss at Sydney Showground Stadium. McKercher continued his good form in his next few games with 22 disposals and 6 marks in round two against Fremantle and 19 disposals and 6 marks in round three against Carlton in the Good Friday Superclash. However, during Gather Round, he only gathered 13 disposals and took no marks, but he laid five tackles during the 70-point loss at Norwood Oval to the reigning grand finalists in the Brisbane Lions. McKercher played again in round five in their clash against Geelong. However, McKercher ended up getting substituted out of the match due to his collision with opposition player Jeremy Cameron late in the first quarter. McKercher was hospitalised with a rib injury following the incident.

McKercher received a nomination for the 2024 Rising Star award after round nine of the 2024 season, which was his third consecutive match collecting 30 or more disposals. During the season, McKercher set a personal best of 37 disposals on two occasions – firstly, in round 17 against Gold Coast, and secondly in round 22 against West Coast.

During the 2026 season, McKercher hit career-best form, continuing to find the football and hit the scoreboard. His form was epitomised in the round eight clash against Geelong, when he kicked two goals. However, he was criticised by media personalities such as Kane Cornes, who accused him of avoiding contested possessions. McKercher was defended by coach Alistair Clarkson, who backed his young talent to play to his strengths.

== Statistics ==
Updated to the end of round 22, 2026.

Legend
G	Goals	K	Kicks	D	Disposals	T	Tackles
B	Behinds	H	Handballs	M	Marks

Season	Team	No.	Games	Totals							Averages (per game)							Votes
Season	Team	No.	Games	G	B	K	H	D	M	T	G	B	K	H	D	M	T	Votes
2024	North Melbourne	10	16	0	2	255	126	381	70	29	0.0	0.1	15.9	7.9	23.8	4.4	1.8	1
2025	North Melbourne	10	23	12	1	342	190	532	78	40	0.5	0.0	14.9	8.3	23.1	3.4	1.7	3
2026	North Melbourne	10	21	6	5	287	175	462	74	45	0.3	0.2	13.7	8.3	22.0	3.5	2.1	0
Career			60	18	8	884	491	1375	222	114	0.3	0.1	14.7	8.2	22.9	3.7	1.9	4
