= Nick Watson =

Australian footballer (born 2005)

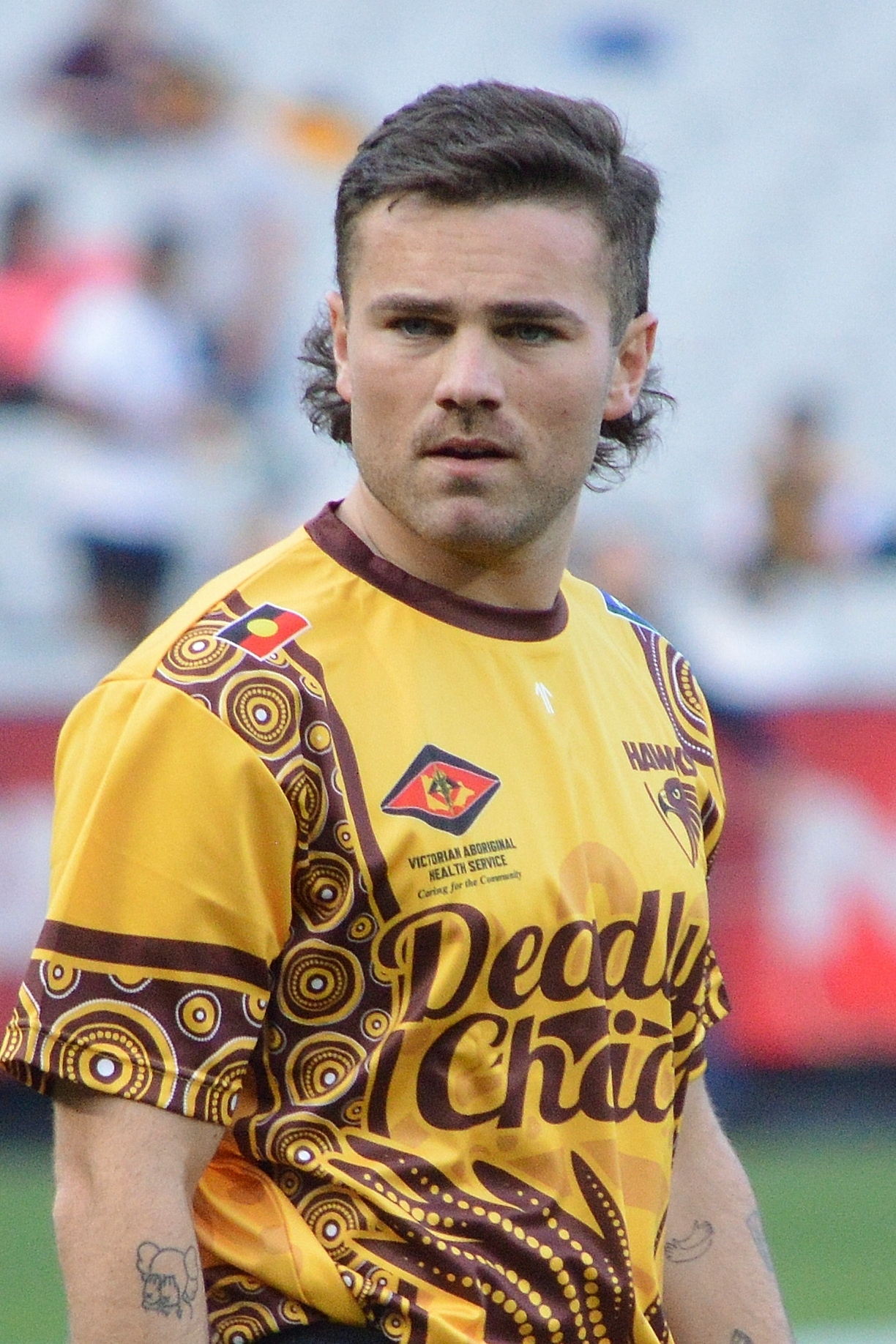
- Watson in May 2026

Personal information
- Full name: Nicholas Watson
- Nicknames: The Wizard, Watto, Wiz, Wizza
- Born: 24 February 2005 (age 21)
- Original team: Eastern Ranges (NAB League)/East Ringwood (EFNL)/Caulfield Grammar (APS)
- Draft: No. 5, 2023 AFL draft, Hawthorn
- Debut: Round 1, 2024, Hawthorn vs. Essendon, at MCG
- Height: 170 cm (5 ft 7 in)
- Weight: 68 kg (150 lb)
- Position: Forward

Club information
- Current club: Hawthorn
- Number: 5

Playing career^{1}
| Years | Club | Games (Goals) |
| 2024– | Hawthorn | 66 (124) |
- ^{1} Playing statistics correct to the end of 2026.

Career highlights
- All-Australian team: 2026; Peter Crimmins Medal: 2026; 2× 22under22 team: 2025, 2026; Mark of the Year: 2026; AFL Rising Star nominee: 2024

Nicholas Watson (born 24 February 2005) is an Australian rules footballer who plays for the Hawthorn Football Club in the Australian Football League (AFL).

== Early life ==
Watson grew up in the Melbourne suburb of Croydon South and was educated at Rowville Sports Academy and Caulfield Grammar. A small forward, Watson in 2023 was the top goalscorer while playing for Caulfield Grammar in the APS competition. He also was the top goalkicker playing for VicMetro in the 2023 National championships. He played his junior football for Montrose and East Ringwood in the Eastern Football League.

Nick attended Rowville Secondary College, as part of the Rowville Sports Academy AFL program, before accepting a scholarship for Year 11 and 12 at Caulfield Grammar.

== AFL career ==
Watson was the fifth selection in the 2023 AFL draft by Hawthorn. Nicknamed "the Wizard" for his exceptional ability in attack, he made his debut against Essendon at the MCG in the opening round of the 2024 AFL season.

He was awarded a 2024 AFL Rising Star nomination in round 19, collecting twelve disposals and kicking three goals during a 66-point defeat of Collingwood.

In December 2025, after 43 games in the number 34, he was awarded the number 5 guernsey number, which was previously James Worpel's number before he was traded to Geelong.

Watson won Mark of the Year in 2026 for a horizontal mark in wet conditions.

== Statistics ==
Updated to the end of 2026.

Legend
| G | Goals | K | Kicks | D | Disposals | T | Tackles |
| B | Behinds | H | Handballs | M | Marks |

| Season | Team | No. | Games | Totals | | | | | | | Averages (per game) | | | | | | | Votes |
| Season | Team | No. | Games | G | B | K | H | D | M | T | G | B | K | H | D | M | T | Votes |
|---|---|---|---|---|---|---|---|---|---|---|---|---|---|---|---|---|---|---|
| 2024 | Hawthorn | 34 | 18 | 25 | 27 | 118 | 77 | 195 | 55 | 45 | 1.4 | 1.5 | 6.6 | 4.3 | 10.8 | 3.1 | 2.5 | 0 |
| 2025 | Hawthorn | 34 | 25 | 36 | 18 | 145 | 127 | 272 | 51 | 51 | 1.4 | 0.7 | 5.8 | 5.1 | 10.9 | 2.0 | 2.0 | 0 |
| 2026 | Hawthorn | 5 | 23 | 63 | 26 | 194 | 120 | 314 | 53 | 50 | 2.7 | 1.1 | 8.4 | 5.2 | 13.7 | 2.3 | 2.2 | 9 |
| Career | | | 66 | 124 | 71 | 457 | 324 | 781 | 159 | 146 | 1.9 | 1.1 | 6.9 | 4.9 | 11.8 | 2.4 | 2.2 | 9 |

== Honours and achievements ==
Team

- McClelland Trophy (Hawthorn): 2024

Individual

- All-Australian team: 2026
- Peter Crimmins Medal: 2026
- 2× 22under22 team: 2025, 2026
- Mark of the Year: 2026
- AFL Rising Star nominee: 2024
