= Caleb Windsor =

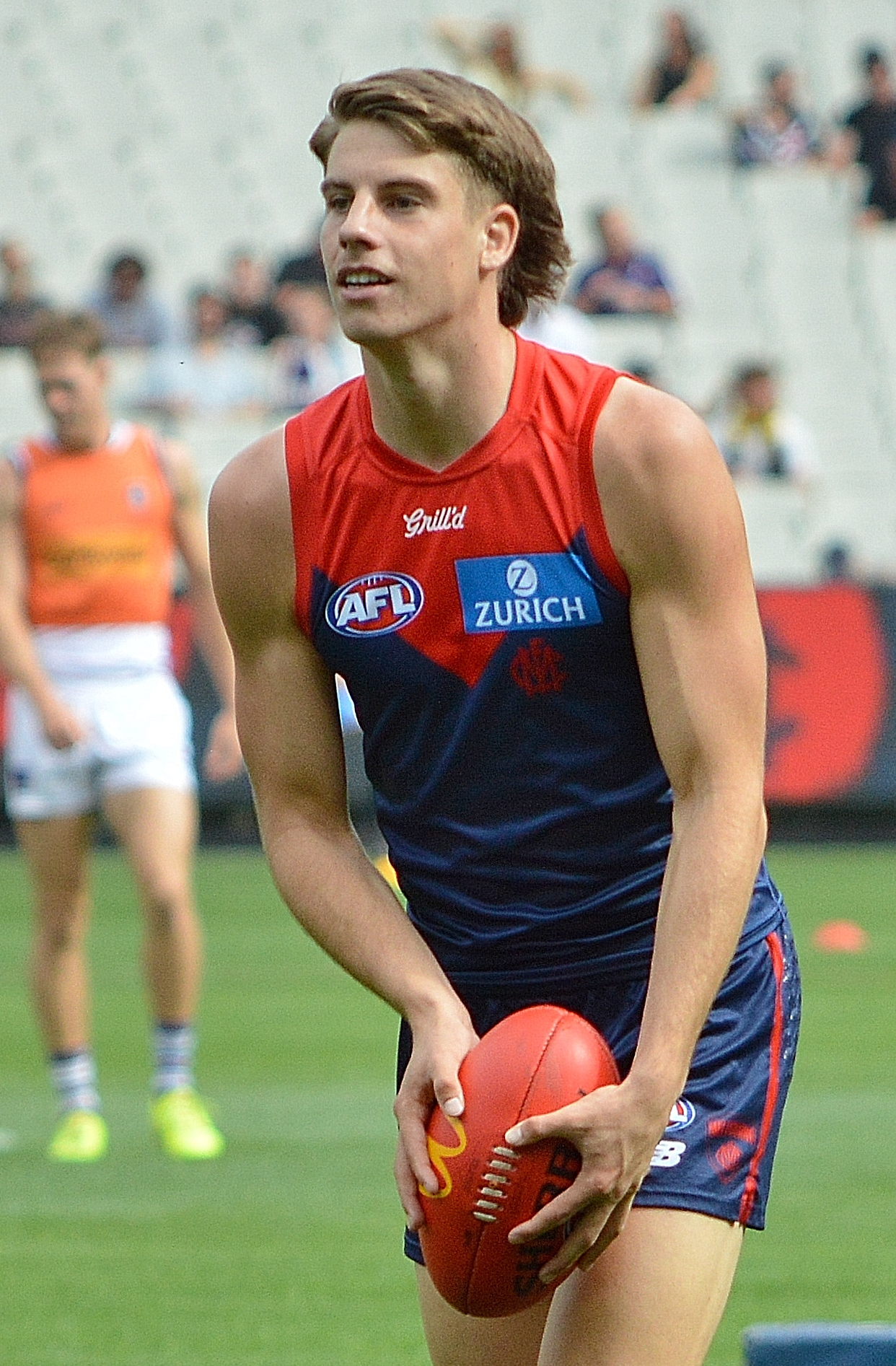
- Windsor in April 2025

Personal information
- Born: 9 June 2005 (age 21)
- Original team: Lysterfield/Eastern Ranges
- Draft: No. 7, 2023 AFL draft
- Height: 185 cm (6 ft 1 in)
- Position: Midfielder

Club information
- Current club: Melbourne
- Number: 6

Playing career^{1}
Years	Club	Games (Goals)
2024–	Melbourne	54 (17)
- ^{1} Playing statistics correct to the end of round 22, 2026.

Caleb Windsor is a professional Australian rules footballer who was selected by Melbourne as the number seven pick in the 2023 AFL draft.

== Career ==
Windsor played his junior football at Knox Falcons and Lysterfield Wolves in the Eastern Suburbs of Melbourne, before making the Eastern Ranges NAB League team in 2022 as an under-age player. The next season, on the back of strong performances with Eastern Ranges, he was selected in the Victorian Metro team for the 2023 AFL National Championships. He attended Rowville Secondary College as part of their selective sports academy.

Off these performances he was drafted at Pick 7 in the 2023 AFL Draft.

Windsor would make his AFL debut in the Demon's Opening Round match against Sydney in a 22-point loss.

== Statistics ==
Updated to the end of round 22, 2026.

Legend
G	Goals	K	Kicks	D	Disposals	T	Tackles
B	Behinds	H	Handballs	M	Marks

Season	Team	No.	Games	Totals							Averages (per game)							Votes
Season	Team	No.	Games	G	B	K	H	D	M	T	G	B	K	H	D	M	T	Votes
2024	Melbourne	6	19	8	5	165	110	275	57	49	0.4	0.3	8.7	5.8	14.5	3.0	2.6	0
2025	Melbourne	6	17	2	4	153	89	242	51	29	0.1	0.2	9.0	5.2	14.2	3.0	1.7	0
2026	Melbourne	6	18	7	4	162	123	285	38	48	0.4	0.2	9.0	6.8	15.8	2.1	2.7	0
Career			54	17	13	480	322	802	146	126	0.3	0.2	8.9	6.0	14.9	2.7	2.3	0
