= Darcy Wilson =

Australian rules footballer (born 2005)

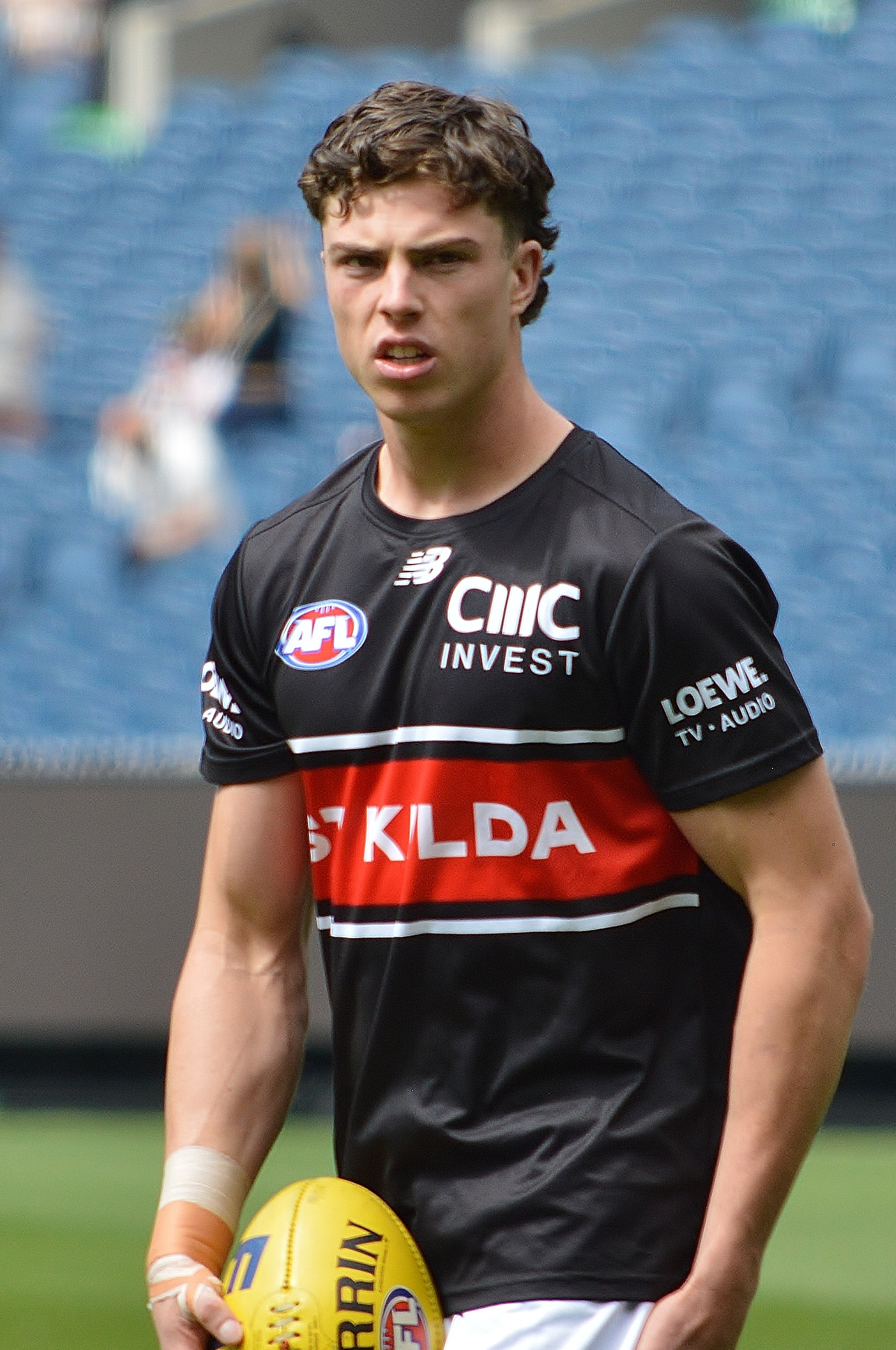
- Wilson in March 2026

Personal information
- Born: 18 August 2005 (age 21)
- Original team: Wangaratta Rovers/Murray Bushrangers
- Draft: No. 18, 2023 national draft
- Debut: 16 March 2024, St Kilda vs. Geelong, at Kardinia Park
- Height: 185 cm (6 ft 1 in)
- Weight: 84 kg (185 lb)
- Position: Forward

Club information
- Current club: St Kilda
- Number: 22

Playing career^{1}
Years	Club	Games (Goals)
2024–	St Kilda	61 (46)
- ^{1} Playing statistics correct to the end of round 22, 2026.

Career highlights
- AFL Rising Star nominee: 2024

Darcy Wilson (born 18 August 2005) is an Australian rules footballer who plays for the St Kilda Football Club in the Australian Football League (AFL). He was drafted by St Kilda with their first pick in the 2023 AFL draft, at pick 18 overall.

== AFL career ==
Wilson immediately impressed at St Kilda, winning the club's 3 kilometre time trial in December 2023. In the pre-season match against North Melbourne, he cemented his place in the team with 24 disposals and 10 marks.

Wilson made his AFL debut in Round 1 of the 2024 AFL season, having 11 disposals and kicking 2 goals in an 8-point loss to Geelong.

He was nominated for the 2024 AFL Rising Star in Round 6 following his 15 disposals and one goal in a loss to the Western Bulldogs.

Wilson had an outstanding performance in the final game of the 2025 AFL season kicking 5 goals and having 23 diposals.

== Statistics ==
Updated to the end of round 22, 2026.

Legend
G	Goals	K	Kicks	D	Disposals	T	Tackles
B	Behinds	H	Handballs	M	Marks

Season	Team	No.	Games	Totals							Averages (per game)							Votes
Season	Team	No.	Games	G	B	K	H	D	M	T	G	B	K	H	D	M	T	Votes
2024	St Kilda	22	23	15	14	211	142	353	98	48	0.7	0.6	9.2	6.2	15.3	4.3	2.1	0
2025	St Kilda	22	18	15	5	162	118	280	63	41	0.8	0.3	9.0	6.6	15.6	3.5	2.3	0
2026	St Kilda	22	20	16	16	234	208	442	96	52	0.8	0.8	11.7	10.4	22.1	4.8	2.6	0
Career			61	46	35	607	468	1075	257	141	0.8	0.6	10.0	7.7	17.6	4.2	2.3	0
