= 2019 AFL Under 18 Championships =

Youth Australian rules football competition

2019 AFL Under-18 Championships
- Teams: 5

Division 1
- Teams: 5
- Champions: Western Australia
- Larke Medal: Deven Robertson (WA)

The 2019 NAB AFL Under-18 Championships was the 24th edition of the AFL Under-18 Championships.

The tournament was played between five teams—Allies, South Australia, Vic Country, Vic Metro and Western Australia—playing each other across five rounds.

Western Australia won the tournament for the first time since 2009, Western Australia captain and midfielder Deven Robertson won the Larke Medal as the tournament's best player.

== Fixture ==
	Round 1
Saturday, 8 June	Western Australia 12.14 (86)	def.	Vic Metro 10.9 (69)	Lathlain Park	Report
Sunday, 9 June	Allies 2.7 (19)	def. by	Vic Country 18.8 (116)	UTAS Stadium	Report
	Bye; South Australia

	Round 2
Saturday, 15 June	Western Australia 4.11 (35)	def. by	South Australia 7.4 (46)	Optus Stadium	Report
Saturday, 1 June	Vic Metro 7.9 (51)	def. by	Vic Country 9.10 (64)	MCG	Report
	Bye; Allies

	Round 3
Saturday, 22 June	Allies 5.13 (43)	def. by	Western Australia 10.8 (68)	Alberton Oval	Report
Saturday, 22 June	South Australia 7.8 (50)	def. by	Vic Metro 9.13 (67)	Alberton Oval	Report
	Bye; Vic Country

	Round 4
Friday, 28 June	Vic Metro 10.8 (68)	def. by	Allies 11.4 (70)	GMHBA Stadium	Report
Friday, 28 June	Vic Country 9.9 (63)	def.	South Australia 9.8 (62)	GMHBA Stadium	Report
	Bye; Western Australia

	Round 5
Wednesday, 3 July	Vic Country 6.10 (46)	def. by	Western Australia 7.9 (51)	Marvel Stadium	Report
Wednesday, 3 July	South Australia 9.12 (66)	def.	Allies 7.7 (49)	Marvel Stadium	Report
	Bye; Vic Metro

== All-Australian team ==
The 2019 All-Australian team

2019 Under 18 All-Australian team
B:	Connor Budarick (All)	Sam De Koning (VC)	Will Gould (SA)
HB:	Lachlan Ash (VC)	Fischer McAsey (VM)	Hayden Young (VC)
C:	Noah Anderson (VM)	Deven Robertson (WA) (c)	Matthew Rowell (VM)
HF:	Jackson Mead (SA)	Elijah Taylor (WA)	Sam Flanders (VC)
F:	Caleb Serong (VC)	Brodie Kemp (VC)	Liam Henry (WA)
Foll:	Tom Green (All)	Mitch O'Neill (All)	Luke Jackson (WA)
Int:	Harry Schoenberg (SA)	Jeremy Sharp (WA)	Cody Weightman (VC)
Int:	Trent Rivers (WA)	Dylan Stephens (SA)	
Coach:	Peter Sumich (WA)		
