= Adam Treloar =

Australian rules footballer (born 1993)

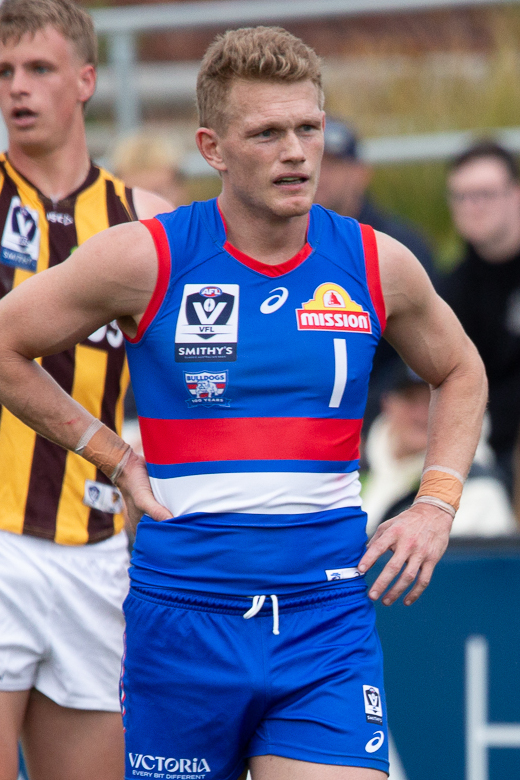
- Treloar playing in the VFL in 2025

Personal information
- Full name: Adam Treloar
- Born: 9 March 1993 (age 33)
- Original team: Dandenong Stingrays (TAC Cup)
- Draft: 2010 under-age selection
- Debut: Round 3, 2012, Greater Western Sydney vs. West Coast, at Blacktown ISP Oval
- Height: 184 cm (6 ft 0 in)
- Weight: 89 kg (196 lb)
- Position: Midfielder

Playing career^{1}
Years	Club	Games (Goals)
2012–2015	Greater Western Sydney	79 (48)
2016–2020	Collingwood	94 (49)
2021–2026	Western Bulldogs	90 (61)
Total		263 (158)
- ^{1} Playing statistics correct to the end of 2026.

Career highlights
- All-Australian team: 2024; Anzac Medal: 2018; Neale Daniher Trophy: 2019; AFL Rising Star nominee: 2012; Footscray VFL premiership player: 2025

Adam Treloar (born 9 March 1993) is a former professional Australian rules footballer who played for the Western Bulldogs in the Australian Football League (AFL). He previously played for the Greater Western Sydney Giants from 2012 to 2015 and the Collingwood Football Club from 2016 to 2020. Treloar was selected in the 2024 All-Australian team and won the Anzac Medal in 2018 and Neale Daniher Trophy in 2019. He received a nomination for the 2012 AFL Rising Star award in round 18 of the 2012 season. Adam Treloar announced on the 9th September 2026 that he will retire after not being offered a contract from the Bulldogs for 2027. Treloar finishes his career with 263 games and 158 goals across three clubs, earning All-Australian selection in 2024 with the Bulldogs.

== Personal life ==
Treloar was raised in public housing in Dandenong, attending Dandenong North Primary School and Dandenong High School.

== Junior career ==
Treloar played his junior football for Noble Park and later went on to represent Victoria Country in the 2009 AFL Under 18 Championships, winning Vic Country's MVP. He furthered his football by playing in the TAC Cup with the Dandenong Stingrays as well as becoming a member of the AIS-AFL Academy. Adam also represented Vic Country in the 2010 AFL Under 18 Championships. He was named on the half-forward flank of the Under 18 team of the year and played alongside future Greater Western Sydney teammates such as Dylan Shiel, Matthew Buntine, Tomas Bugg, Taylor Adams, and Jeremy Cameron.

== AFL career ==
=== Greater Western Sydney (2012–2015) ===
Treloar was recruited by Greater Western Sydney as an under-age selection prior to the 2010 AFL draft and played with the Dandenong Stingrays and the Noble Park Football Club during his junior career. In 2011 he played for GWS Giants in the NEAFL one year prior to their AFL entry. He made his AFL debut in round 3, 2012 against West Coast at Blacktown International Sportspark. He was the round nomination for the Rising Star after the round 18, 120-point loss to Collingwood, where he amassed 39 disposals. He went on to finish fourth overall in the award after receiving 15 out of a possible 45 votes.

Treloar played 20 games during 2013, averaging 24 disposals a match, and finished fifth in the best-and-fairest count. He was touted by former Hawthorn forward Dermott Brereton as the next Mark Ricciuto, saying that he had the potential to "be an absolute elite player in the midfield and be top five in the comp with his ability, with his skill set and with his want and desire for the game." His 2014 season was described as "brilliant" where he averaged 27.6 disposals and 5.5 tackles in 20 matches and finished fourth in the best-and-fairest count. He was recognised as one of the best young players in the league by being selected on the wing in the AFLPA 22under22 team.

Treloar had his best season to date during 2015 where he was the runner-up in the best-and-fairest, finishing behind Heath Shaw, however, his season was filled with speculation that he would leave the Giants to return to his home state of Victoria. He informed the club in September that he wanted to be traded and nominated Collingwood as his preferred destination.

=== Collingwood (2016–2020) ===
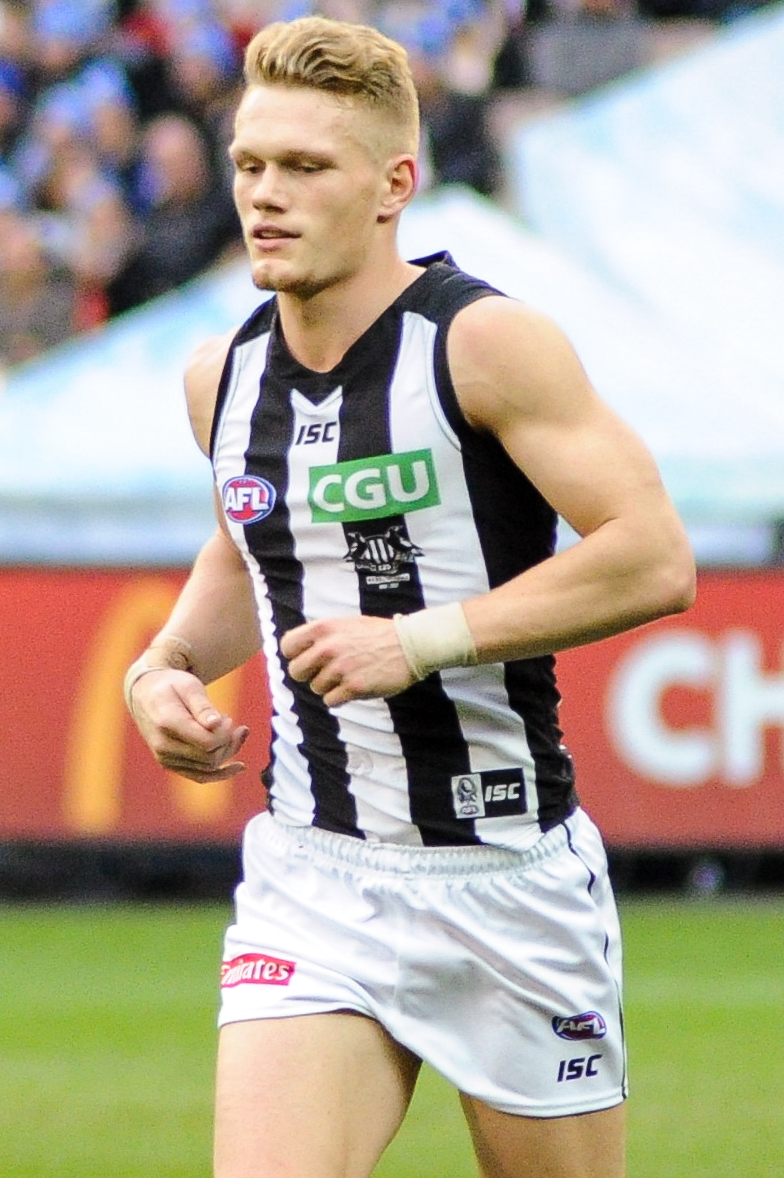
Treloar playing for Collingwood in 2017

Treloar officially joined Collingwood on a six-year deal on 21 October 2015. He had an outstanding first season for the club, playing all 22 games, and lead the club for disposals, tackles, clearances, inside 50s and bounces. At the end of the season he won the R.T. Rush Trophy, finishing second in the Copeland Trophy count, behind skipper Scott Pendlebury. Treloar followed up with a consistent second season at the club in 2017, playing in 21 games. In 2018, Treloar won the Anzac Medal, and later played in the losing grand final to West Coast.

Treloar's 2019 season saw him win plenty of the football, he finished the season with a total of 789 disposals which saw him lead the entire AFL in the home and away season, as well as finals, he also did lead the league in handballs, tallying 454 for the season. His season was highlighted with 40 disposals and 7 tackles against North Melbourne in Round 15, he averaged 32.9 disposals per game, played 24 games and polled 18 Brownlow Medal Votes. He was awarded the Jock McHale Trophy for finishing fourth in the 2019 Copeland Trophy vote count.

As the 2020 AFL season drew to a close, rumours began to circulate that Treloar would seek a move to Queensland, after his partner Kim Ravaillion signed a one-year deal to play netball with the Queensland Firebirds and temporarily relocate to Brisbane with the pair's daughter. It emerged that it was in fact Collingwood seeking to move on Treloar and his remaining five-year contract, citing both salary cap concerns and concern for his mental wellbeing due to the distance from his family - though Treloar remained steadfast in his desire to remain in Victoria. Treloar was traded from Collingwood to the Western Bulldogs on 12 November, in the final minute of trade period. Collingwood received pick 14 and a future 2nd round pick, while the Bulldogs received Treloar and picks 26, 33 and 42.

=== Western Bulldogs (2021–2026) ===
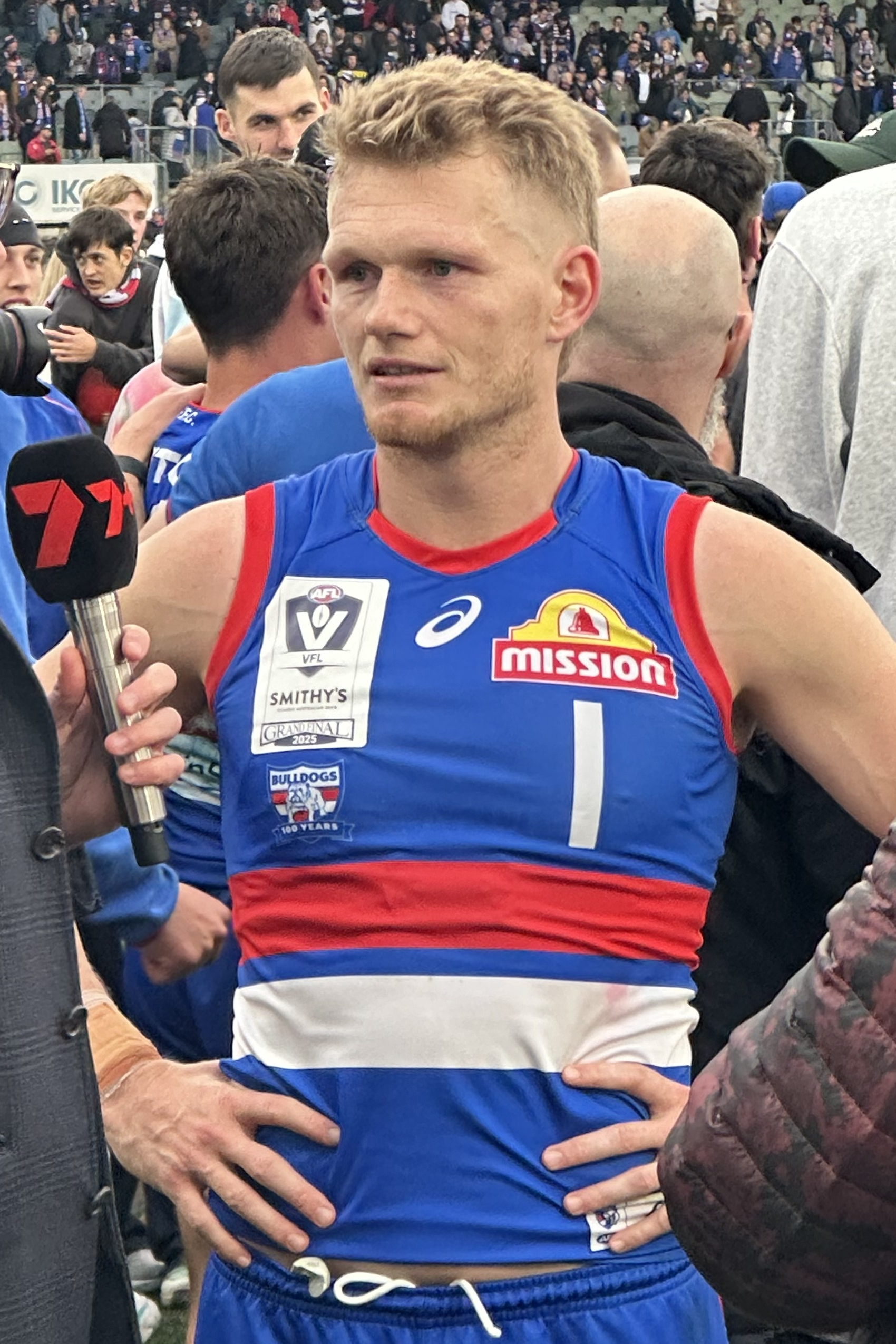
Treloar post-match with the Western Bulldogs' VFL team in 2025

Treloar suffered a syndesmosis injury in Round 10 of the 2021 AFL season, which was announced to keep him out of the side for up to two months. At that stage the Bulldogs had won 9 out of 10 games. He returned to play from Round 21 onwards, which started with 3 consecutive losses to finish the regular season as the Bulldogs fell out of the Top 4 by just 0.5%, thereby losing the "double chance". The Bulldogs regained their form to win all 3 finals including the Preliminary Final demolition of Port Adelaide in Adelaide, which set up the Grand Final match against Melbourne in Perth after the bye.

In the 2024 AFL season, Treloar played 22 home-and-away games in addition to the Bulldogs' elimination final loss to Hawthorn, throughout which he kicked a career high 16 goals and led the league for average disposals. In recognition of his Career Best form he was awarded with All-Australian team honours, being placed on the interchange bench.

Treloar managed only nine senior games in his last two years with the club due to a string of soft-tissue injuries, notably calf muscle tears. He announced his retirement "with the heaviest of hearts" in September 2026 after the Bulldogs declined to offer him a contract for the 2027 season.

== Statistics ==
Updated to the end of round 22, 2026.

Legend
G	Goals	K	Kicks	D	Disposals	T	Tackles
B	Behinds	H	Handballs	M	Marks
†	Led the league for the season

Season	Team	No.	Games	Totals							Averages (per game)							Votes
Season	Team	No.	Games	G	B	K	H	D	M	T	G	B	K	H	D	M	T	Votes
2012	Greater Western Sydney	17	18	12	5	223	157	380	86	48	0.7	0.3	12.4	8.7	21.1	4.8	2.7	0
2013	Greater Western Sydney	17	20	9	6	240	240	480	89	68	0.5	0.3	12.0	12.0	24.0	4.5	3.4	0
2014	Greater Western Sydney	17	20	13	11	251	301	552	72	111	0.7	0.6	12.6	15.1	27.6	3.6	5.6	5
2015	Greater Western Sydney	17	21	14	11	264	313	577	80	112	0.7	0.5	12.6	14.9	27.5	3.8	5.3	7
2016	Collingwood	7	22	13	18	283	390	673	71	139	0.6	0.8	12.9	17.7	30.6	3.2	6.3	21
2017	Collingwood	7	21	13	11	275	353	628	54	133	0.6	0.5	13.1	16.8	29.9	2.6	6.3	11
2018	Collingwood	7	17	12	15	215	287	502	54	83	0.7	0.9	12.6	16.9	29.5	3.2	4.9	8
2019	Collingwood	7	24	10	4	335	454^{†}	789	95	117	0.4	0.2	14.0	18.9	32.9	4.0	4.9	18
2020 (Note: The 2020 season was played with 17 home-and-away matches per team (down from 22) and 16-minute quarters with time on (down from 20-minute quarters with time on) due to the impact of the COVID-19 pandemic.)	Collingwood	7	10	1	4	122	147	269	20	29	0.1	0.4	12.2	14.7	26.9^{†}	2.0	2.9	4
2021	Western Bulldogs	1	17	13	9	186	209	395	50	73	0.8	0.5	10.9	12.3	23.2	2.9	4.3	7
2022	Western Bulldogs	1	22	15	12	297	298	595	90	70	0.7	0.5	13.5	13.5	27.0	4.1	3.2	6
2023	Western Bulldogs	1	19	13	5	253	304	557	54	100	0.7	0.3	13.3	16.0	29.3	2.8	5.3	4
2024	Western Bulldogs	1	23	16	6	348	377	725	76	109	0.7	0.3	15.1	16.4	31.5^{†}	3.3	4.7	26
2025	Western Bulldogs	1	4	2	0	44	41	85	12	5	0.5	0.0	11.0	10.3	21.3	3.0	1.3	0
2026	Western Bulldogs	1	5	2	3	38	45	83	18	5	0.4	0.6	7.6	9.0	16.6	3.6	1.0	0
Career			263	158	120	3374	3916	7290	921	1202	0.6	0.5	12.8	14.9	27.7	3.5	4.6	117

== Honours and achievements ==
- All-Australian team: 2024
- Anzac Medal: 2018
- Neale Daniher Trophy: 2019
- AFL Rising Star nominee: 2012
