= Errol Gulden =

Australian rules footballer (born 2002)

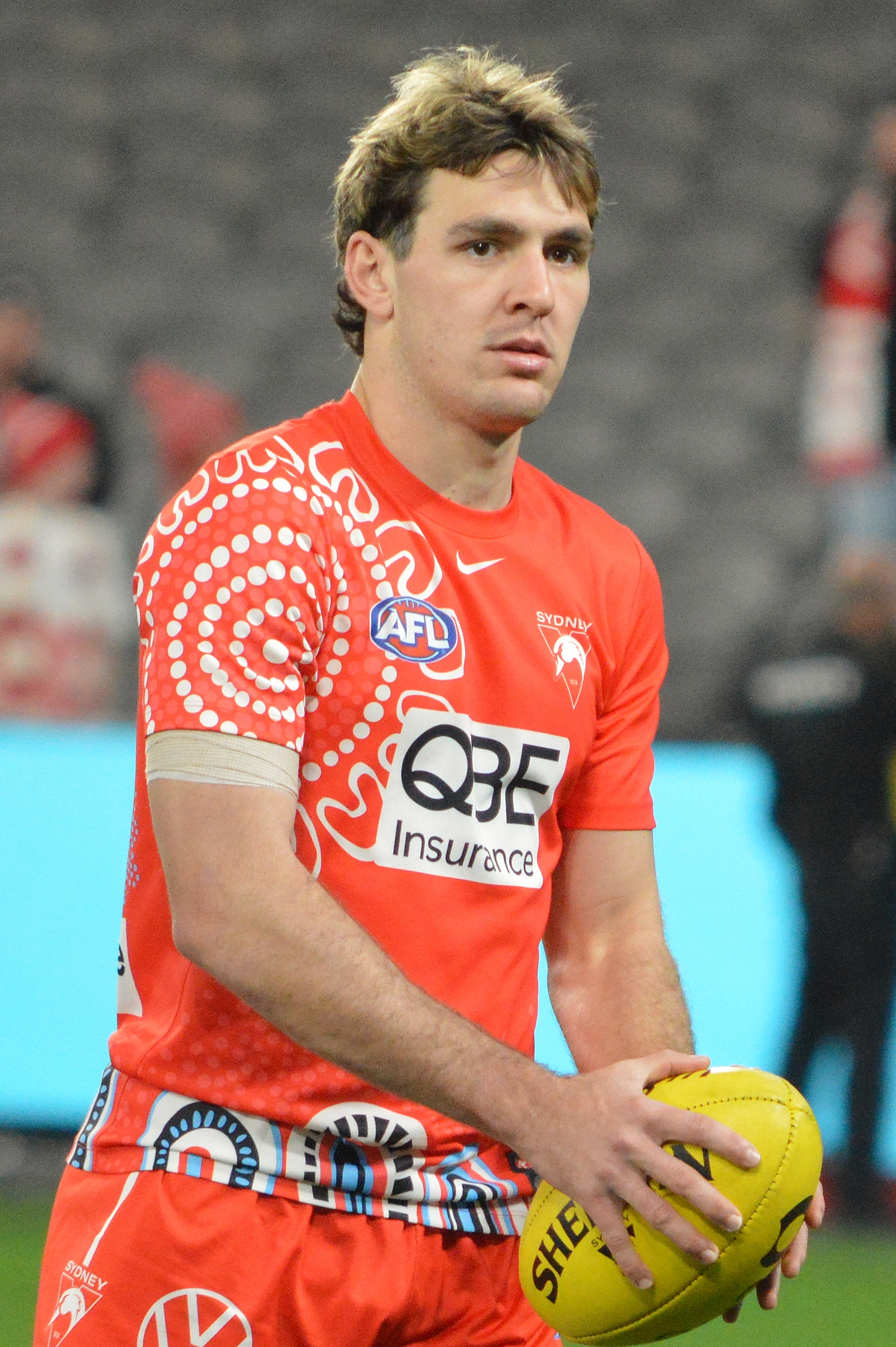
- Gulden in August 2026

Personal information
- Full name: Errol Gulden
- Born: 18 July 2002 (age 24); Sydney, New South Wales
- Original team: UNSW-Eastern Suburbs Bulldogs (AFL Sydney)
- Draft: No. 32, 2020 national draft
- Debut: Round 1, 2021, Sydney vs. Brisbane Lions, at the Gabba
- Height: 175 cm (5 ft 9 in)
- Weight: 77 kg (170 lb)
- Position: Midfielder

Club information
- Current club: Sydney
- Number: 21

Playing career^{1}
Years	Club	Games (Goals)
2021–	Sydney	116 (79)
- ^{1} Playing statistics correct to the end of 2026.

Career highlights
- 2× All-Australian team: 2023, 2024; Bob Skilton Medal: 2023; 22under22 team: 2023, 2024; AFLPA best first-year player: 2021; 4× Brett Kirk Medal: 2023 (game 2), 2024 (both games), 2026 (game 2); AFL Rising Star nominee: 2021

Errol Gulden (born 18 July 2002) is a professional Australian rules footballer playing for the Sydney Swans in the Australian Football League (AFL). Gulden is a dual All-Australian and won the Bob Skilton Medal in 2023. He also won the AFLPA best first-year player award in 2021 and was nominated for the 2021 AFL Rising Star award.

== Early life ==
Gulden was born in Sydney to a Turkish-born father and an Australian mother. He grew up in the suburb of Malabar and supported Carlton. He began playing junior Australian rules football for the Maroubra Saints Junior Football Club in Maroubra as at the age of 4. However his main passion was soccer, he was considered quite a talented player and desired to continue toward playing it professionally. Gulden was identified by Sydney Swans talent scouts and was signed to the Sydney Swans academy at 11 years of age.

In 2017, while attending Marcellin College, Gulden was named in the NSW independent schools team to New Zealand to play against the New Zealand national team. In 2018, Gulden was named as an Under 16s All-Australian after his stellar season with the Under-16 NSW/ACT Rams, and was also named as the team's most valuable player. He played in the 2019 NAB All Stars Futures Match alongside future teammates Braeden Campbell and Logan McDonald. Gulden also played for the UNSW-Eastern Suburbs Bulldogs in three seasons from 2018 to 2020 for a total of 33 games and was named as best on ground in their 2019 premiership win over Sydney University.

== AFL career ==
Gulden was recruited by Sydney with the 32nd draft pick in the 2020 AFL draft.

Gulden debuted in the opening round of the 2021 AFL season, starring for Sydney in a 31-point win over the Brisbane Lions at the Gabba. In his first game, he kicked 3 goals and collected 19 disposals and earned himself a Rising Star nomination for the round, as the Swans won at the Gabba and defeated the Lions, in both instances, for the first time since round 10, 2018. In addition, Gulden polled two votes in the 2021 Brownlow Medal, becoming the fifth Swan to poll votes on debut. He backed up his groundbreaking round one performance with a 22 disposal, 1 goal performance the next week in the team's 33 point win over Adelaide. After this performance, Champion Data statistics described him as having two of the best games recorded by a debutant ever. Gulden played the first eight games of the 2021 season, before being sidelined for an extended period of time due to stress reactions in his foot. He returned in Round 15 against Port Adelaide and remained in the side for the rest of the year. Gulden became a key part of Sydney's best 22, helping the team qualify for finals after a 16th-placed finish the year before. He played 15 games and kicked 12 goals, and was recognised by his peers when he won the AFLPA Best First Year Player award. He also polled in the top 5 for the Rising Star, and was the highest-polling first-year player.

In 2023, Gulden carried his side to 8th place, securing their place in finals. Due to his display of dominance this season, he was able to poll 27 votes in the Brownlow Medal, finishing in equal fourth place, just four votes behind winner Lachie Neale. This was the most votes by a Swan in a season since 1940. He also received selection to the All-Australian team for the first time. He also won the Bob Skilton Medal, awarded to the best Swans player for the year, alongside being voted on for the AFLPA's 22under22 team.

Gulden was considered a key part of Sydney's success during the 2024 season, including their minor premiership. His performance throughout the season earned him a second selection in the All-Australian team. He also received 25 votes in that year's Brownlow Medal. He extended his time at the team that same year, signing a 4-year contract.

In the 2025 preseason clash against Gold Coast at People First Stadium, Gulden fractured his ankle, which saw him miss the first half of the year. He returned in the round 15 clash against Port Adelaide, and eventually brought up his 100th AFL game against Essendon in round 21.

Gulden suffered another early season injury that ruled him out of the 2026 AFL season for four months during round 1, this time being a shoulder injury. He returned in round 16 against the Brisbane Lions. A slower start upon return quickly turned into a remarkable run to form, averaging 40 disposals in the last 5 rounds of the home and away season, helping secure the Swans a 2nd place finish. This display of dominance was highlighted in the 2026 Brownlow where he received 15 of a possible 15 votes in those last rounds. He was a key component of the historic Qualifying Final upset against the back-to-back reigning premiers, the Brisbane Lions, helping the undermanned side overcome the absence of the 5 suspended players following the Pullman Hotel investigation by 53 points with a best on ground performance of 34 disposals, 915 meters gained and a goal.

== Statistics ==
Updated to the end of round 22, 2026.

Legend
G	Goals	K	Kicks	D	Disposals	T	Tackles
B	Behinds	H	Handballs	M	Marks

Season	Team	No.	Games	Totals							Averages (per game)							Votes
Season	Team	No.	Games	G	B	K	H	D	M	T	G	B	K	H	D	M	T	Votes
2021	Sydney	21	18	14	11	195	87	282	82	52	0.8	0.6	10.8	4.8	15.7	4.6	2.9	2
2022	Sydney	21	25	18	8	338	142	480	112	89	0.7	0.3	13.5	5.7	19.2	4.5	3.6	3
2023	Sydney	21	24	22	20	464	179	643	126	119	0.9	0.8	19.3	7.5	26.8	5.3	5.0	27
2024	Sydney	21	26	15	16	514	191	705	146	92	0.6	0.6	19.8	7.3	27.1	5.6	3.5	25
2025	Sydney	21	10	6	1	164	102	266	53	43	0.6	0.1	16.4	10.2	26.6	5.3	4.3	6
2026	Sydney	21	9	3	4	157	101	258	33	48	0.3	0.4	17.4	11.2	28.7	3.7	5.3	0
Career			112	78	60	1832	802	2634	552	443	0.7	0.5	16.4	7.2	23.5	4.9	4.0	63

== Honours and achievements ==
Team

- AFL minor premiership (Sydney): 2024
- McClelland Trophy (Sydney): 2026

Individual

- 2× All-Australian team: 2023, 2024
- Bob Skilton Medal: 2023
- AFLPA best first-year player: 2021
- 3× Brett Kirk Medal: 2023 (game 2), 2024 (both games)
- AFL Rising Star nominee: 2021
