= Archie Perkins =

Australian football league player

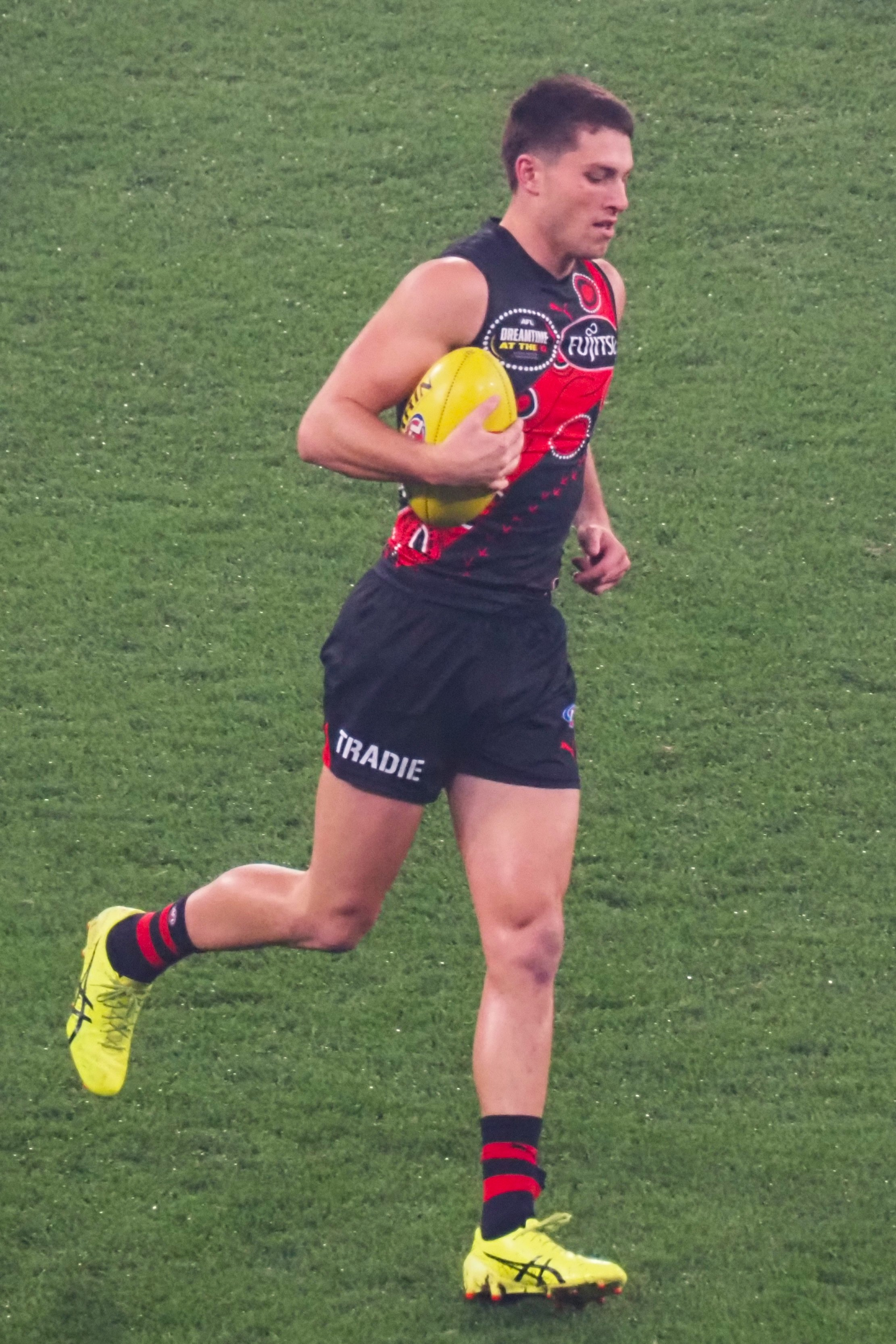
- Perkins playing for Essendon in 2025

Personal information
- Full name: Archie Perkins
- Nickname: Perko
- Born: 26 March 2002 (age 24)
- Original team: Sandringham Dragons
- Draft: No. 9, 2020 national draft
- Debut: 3 April 2021, Essendon vs. St Kilda, at Marvel Stadium
- Height: 188 cm (6 ft 2 in)
- Weight: 85 kg (187 lb)
- Position: Midfielder / forward

Club information
- Current club: Essendon
- Number: 16

Playing career^{1}
| Years | Club | Games (Goals) |
| 2021– | Essendon | 115 (70) |
- ^{1} Playing statistics correct to the end of round 22, 2026.

Career highlights
- 2021 AFL Rising Star: nominee

Archie Perkins (born 26 March 2002) is an Australian rules footballer who plays for Essendon in the Australian Football League (AFL). He was recruited by the Essendon with the 9th draft pick in the 2020 AFL draft.

== Early life ==
Archie was born to mother Victoria and father Simon, both of New Zealand, who emigrated in their 20s. He studied at Brighton Grammar School in Melbourne. Perkins trained with well-known AFL players such as Hunter Clark and Max King as a part of the NAB AFL Academy program. He also played for the Sandringham Dragons in the NAB League, where he played a 6-game season in 2019, his coach at the time describing him as "a very confident kid, a pretty talented footballer and just a well-rounded person." Despite being touted as a midfielder, Perkins averaged 1.7 goals a game in the NAB League, as well as averaging 14.2 disposals.

== AFL career ==
Perkins debuted in Essendon's shock win over St Kilda in the 3rd round of the 2021 AFL season. On debut, Perkins collected 14 disposals, 1 behind and 6 inside 50s. He received a Rising Star nomination after collecting 18 disposals, 4 marks and 3 goals in a dominant performance against Adelaide.

He signed a 2-year contract extension in 2022, to remain at Essendon until at least the end of 2024.

Perkins played his 50th AFL game in 2023, out of a possible 56 across his career, with only Errol Gulden the only player from the 2020 draft class to have played more games at the same point.

2026 was a disappointing year for Perkins, playing a career-low sixteen games as he was omitted from the senior team several times. Essendon finished eighteenth, only winning two games, neither of which Perkins played in. Perkins signed a one-year contract extension until the end of 2027.

== Statistics ==
Updated to the end of round 22, 2026.

Legend
| G | Goals | K | Kicks | D | Disposals | T | Tackles |
| B | Behinds | H | Handballs | M | Marks |

| Season | Team | No. | Games | Totals | | | | | | | Averages (per game) | | | | | | | Votes |
| Season | Team | No. | Games | G | B | K | H | D | M | T | G | B | K | H | D | M | T | Votes |
|---|---|---|---|---|---|---|---|---|---|---|---|---|---|---|---|---|---|---|
| 2021 | Essendon | 16 | 21 | 9 | 14 | 116 | 122 | 238 | 58 | 42 | 0.4 | 0.7 | 5.5 | 5.8 | 11.3 | 2.8 | 2.0 | 2 |
| 2022 | Essendon | 16 | 18 | 16 | 13 | 151 | 68 | 219 | 68 | 45 | 0.9 | 0.7 | 8.4 | 3.8 | 12.2 | 3.8 | 2.5 | 0 |
| 2023 | Essendon | 16 | 23 | 18 | 13 | 219 | 132 | 351 | 95 | 65 | 0.8 | 0.6 | 9.5 | 5.7 | 15.3 | 4.1 | 2.8 | 0 |
| 2024 | Essendon | 16 | 18 | 5 | 7 | 165 | 111 | 276 | 56 | 67 | 0.3 | 0.4 | 9.2 | 6.2 | 15.3 | 3.1 | 3.7 | 3 |
| 2025 | Essendon | 16 | 21 | 17 | 6 | 154 | 141 | 295 | 59 | 48 | 0.8 | 0.3 | 7.3 | 6.7 | 14.0 | 2.8 | 2.3 | 0 |
| 2026 | Essendon | 16 | 14 | 5 | 9 | 114 | 91 | 205 | 70 | 20 | 0.4 | 0.6 | 8.1 | 6.5 | 14.6 | 5.0 | 1.4 | 0 |
| Career | | | 115 | 70 | 62 | 919 | 665 | 1584 | 406 | 287 | 0.6 | 0.5 | 8.0 | 5.8 | 13.8 | 3.5 | 2.5 | 5 |
