= Nik Cox =

Australian football league player

Personal information
- Full name: Nikolas Cox
- Born: 15 January 2002 (age 24)
- Original team: Northern Knights (NAB League)/Montmorency
- Draft: No. 8, 2020 national draft
- Debut: 20 March 2021, Essendon vs. Hawthorn, at Marvel Stadium
- Height: 200 cm (6 ft 7 in)
- Weight: 94 kg (207 lb)
- Position: Midfielder

Playing career
Years	Club	Games (Goals)
2021–2026	Essendon	61 (21)

Career highlights
- 2021 AFL Rising Star: nominee

Nikolas Cox (born 15 January 2002) is a former professional Australian rules footballer who played for the Essendon Bombers in the Australian Football League (AFL). He was recruited by Essendon with the 8th draft pick in the 2020 AFL draft. He is the son of former VFL player Darryl Cox.

== Early football ==
Cox played football for the Montmorency Football Club in the Northern Football Netball League. He also played for his school Ivanhoe Grammar in the AGSV school competition. He began playing for the Northern Knights in 2019, and had his 2020 season cancelled due to the impact of the COVID-19 pandemic. During his 2019 season with the Knights, he kicked 9 goals from 10 games, and averaged 12.5 disposals and 4.9 marks a game. Cox represented Vic Metro in the 2019 AFL Under 18 Championships. He began training with Carlton in late 2019 and early 2020 as part of the NAB AFL Academy.

== AFL career ==
Cox debuted in the opening round of the 2020 AFL season, in Essendon's 1 point loss to Hawthorn. On debut, Cox collected 9 disposals, 3 marks and 1 tackle. He was reported for striking Hawthorn player Oliver Hanrahan, and fined $2000. Cox obtained a Rising Star nomination in round 12 of the season, after he collected 23 disposals and kicked a goal.

After missing a significant amount of football due to injury across 2022 and 2023, Cox played his first game in over 14 months in Round 19 of the 2023 AFL Season. He went on to play in all of the final 6 games of Essendon's season.

In Round 22 of the 2024 season, Cox suffered a concussion, which ruled him out of Essendon's final two matches of the season. Symptoms lingered throughout the pre-season leading up to the 2025 season, and delayed Cox's start to the season. In May, Cox returned to football, playing two matches for Essendon's reserves team in the Victorian Football League (VFL), before concussion symptoms returned and Cox was again ruled out indefinitely. This fueled speculation that Cox would be forced to medically retire from football, and he was sent to be assessed by the AFL's independent concussion panel to determine his future in the game. In July, the panel determined that Cox should be ruled out of any football participation for the remainder of 2025, but stopped short of medically retiring him, giving him hope of a return to football in 2026.

Cox made a return to play AFL matches in the 2026 season, however he was delisted at the season's conclusion.

== Personal life ==
Cox supported the Western Bulldogs in his youth. He cited his favourite player from Essendon to watch as Alwyn Davey. Cox attended Ivanhoe Grammar School.

Cox has 2 sisters, Alexandra (Ally) and Montana. His sister, Montana Cox is a fashion model and a past winner of the Australia's Next Top Model reality television show.

He grew up in the Melbourne suburb of Lower Plenty.

== Statistics ==
Updated to the end of round 22, 2026.

Legend
G	Goals	K	Kicks	D	Disposals	T	Tackles
B	Behinds	H	Handballs	M	Marks

Season	Team	No.	Games	Totals							Averages (per game)							Votes
Season	Team	No.	Games	G	B	K	H	D	M	T	G	B	K	H	D	M	T	Votes
2021	Essendon	13	22	9	9	152	107	259	81	47	0.4	0.4	6.9	4.9	11.8	3.7	2.1	0
2022	Essendon	13	5	1	3	26	37	63	20	7	0.2	0.6	5.2	7.4	12.6	4.0	1.4	0
2023	Essendon	13	6	0	3	32	39	71	18	13	0.0	0.5	5.3	6.5	11.8	3.0	2.2	0
2024	Essendon	13	20	8	3	127	114	241	70	50	0.4	0.2	6.4	5.7	12.1	3.5	2.5	0
2025	Essendon	13	0	—	—	—	—	—	—	—	—	—	—	—	—	—	—	0
2026	Essendon	13	8	3	1	44	44	88	25	9	0.4	0.1	5.5	5.5	11.0	3.1	1.1	0
Career			61	21	19	381	341	722	214	126	0.3	0.3	6.2	5.6	11.8	3.5	2.1	0
