= Caleb Serong =

Australian rules footballer (born 2001)

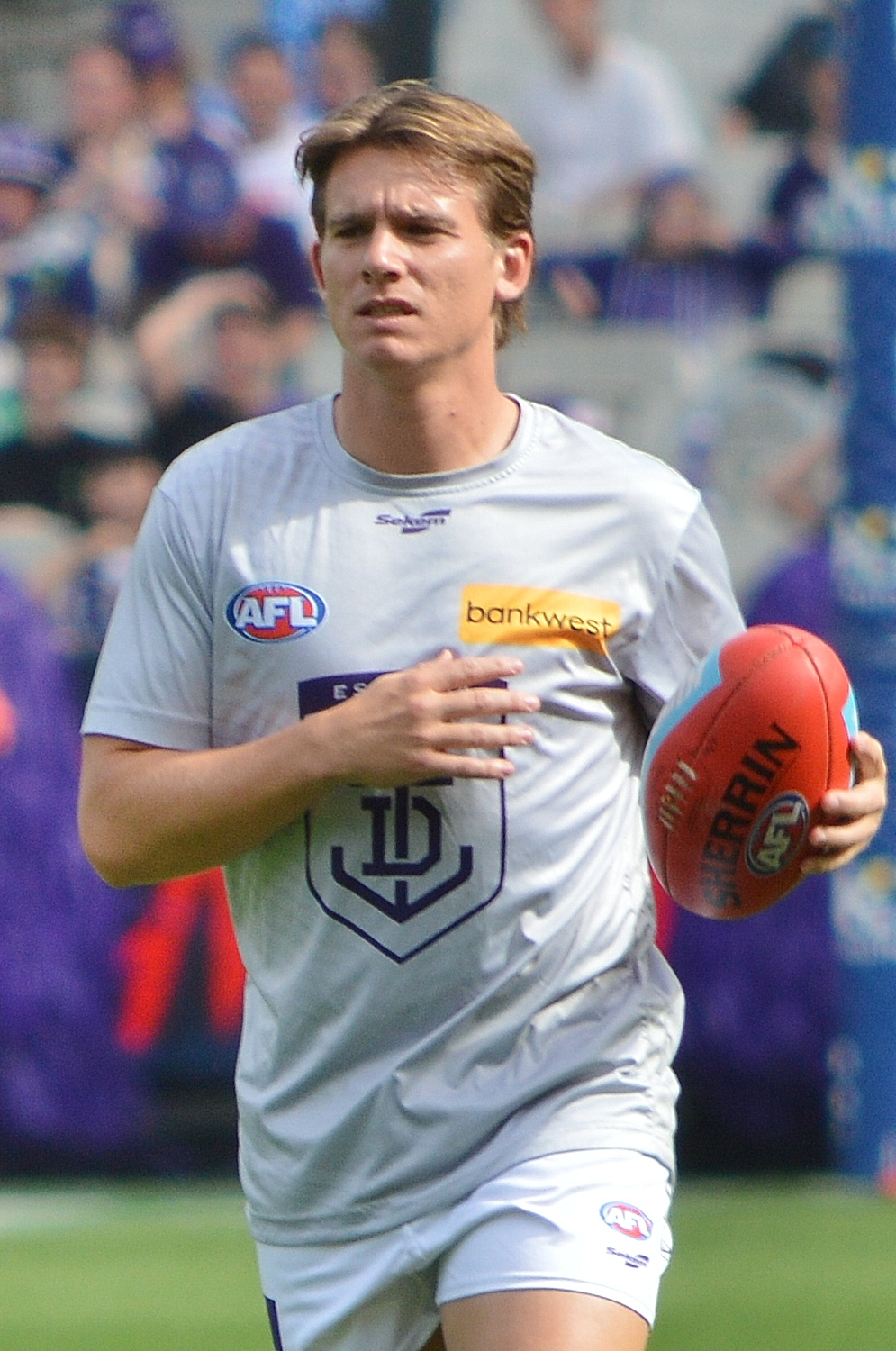
- Serong in April 2025

Personal information
- Full name: Caleb Serong
- Nickname: Sebba
- Born: 9 February 2001 (age 25)
- Original team: Gippsland Power (NAB League)/Geelong Grammar School (APS)/Warragul Colts JFC
- Draft: No. 8, 2019 national draft
- Debut: Round 4, 2020, Fremantle vs. Gold Coast, at Carrara Stadium
- Height: 180 cm (5 ft 11 in)
- Weight: 83 kg (183 lb)
- Position: Midfielder

Club information
- Current club: Fremantle
- Number: 3

Playing career^{1}
Years	Club	Games (Goals)
2020–	Fremantle	150 (48)

Representative team honours^{2}
Years	Team	Games (Goals)
2026	Victoria	1 (1)
- ^{1} Playing statistics correct to the end of the preliminary finals, 2026.^{2} Representative statistics correct as of 2026.

Career highlights
- 3x All-Australian team: 2023, 2024, 2025; 3x Doig Medal: 2023, 2024, 2025; AFL Rising Star: 2020; Beacon Award: 2020; AFLPA best first-year player: 2020; AFLCA best young player award: 2021; AFL Goal of the Year: 2021; 4x Glendinning–Allan Medal: R22 2021, R3 2023, R20 2024, R3 2025; 2x 22under22 team: 2022, 2023; Fremantle co-vice captain: 2023–; Fremantle Best Clubman: 2021; Herald Sun Player of the Year: 2023; 2x Geoff Christian Medal: 2023, 2025; Fremantle Player of the Finals: 2026

Caleb Serong (born 9 February 2001) is an Australian rules footballer who plays for Fremantle in the Australian Football League (AFL). A midfielder known for his ball-winning ability and consistency, Serong has been the co-vice-captain of Fremantle since 2023. He has won three Doig Medals, awarded to the best and fairest Fremantle player, been selected in the All-Australian team three times and won the AFL Rising Star award in his debut season.

== Early life ==
Serong grew up in the Victorian country town of Inverloch before moving to Warragul. From 2013 to 2015 he played for the Warragul Colts JFC he was the U12's best & fairest of 2013 and also helped the U14.5's win the Warragul and District Junior Football League premiership that year. He attended St Paul's Anglican Grammar School and later boarded at Geelong Grammar School on a sports scholarship. He made his senior debut for Warragul Football Club at the age of 15. He co-captained the Victoria Country team at the 2019 AFL Under 18 Championships, where he was awarded the team's MVP award and was named in the All-Australian team. He was drafted with the 8th selection in the 2019 AFL draft from Gippsland Power in the NAB League.

== AFL career ==
=== 2020 ===
Serong made his debut in the fourth round of the 2020 AFL season at Metricon Stadium against Gold Coast.

In Round 8, Serong was awarded the Rising Star nomination after being one of Fremantle's best players in a disappointing 32-point loss to Geelong. He was matched up on Geelong veteran Patrick Dangerfield for a significant portion of the game, keeping him to 18 disposals while collecting 22 of his own. Following this strong performance, he retained his spot in the team for the remainder of the season.

Serong was later awarded the 2020 AFL Rising Star award as the league's best young player, polling 48 out of a possible 50 votes, 9 ahead of runner-up Noah Anderson. He also won the AFL Players' Association Best first-year player award.

=== 2021 ===
In Round 1, he recorded career-best numbers in both disposals and handballs, with 26 and 13 respectively. In Round 6, he registered the first thirty-disposal game of his career in a 51-point win over a struggling North Melbourne side.

Western Derby 53 saw Serong kick Goal of the Year, with a "remarkable" off-the-canvas banana from a difficult angle deep within Optus Stadium's south-east pocket. The goal came at a critical stage of the game, and was further immortalized by commentator Anthony Hudson's now-iconic line "You’ve got every right to be amazed! Serong, so right!". He was awarded the Glendinning–Allan Medal for best on ground honours after the match.

=== 2022 ===
Serong managed 20 games for the 2022 AFL season, missing the Round 3 Western Derby due to a sore knee, and Greater Western Sydney the following week.

He was arguably best-afield in Round 23 against GWS at Manuka Oval in Canberra, collecting a game-high 32 possessions, 11 clearances, eight score involvements and kicking a goal. Serong again had a standout performance in Fremantle's elimination final win over the Western Bulldogs at Optus Stadium, recording 33 disposals – second only to Jack Macrae – 10 clearances and a goal. The following week in Fremantle's semi-final loss to Collingwood, he led the match for both disposals and contested possession, with 34 and 16 respectively.

He finished third in Fremantle's best and fairest award on a countback, after tying with Alex Pearce on 197 votes.

Ahead of the 2023 AFL season, Serong was appointed co-vice-captain of Fremantle alongside fellow midfielder Andrew Brayshaw.

=== 2023 ===
In Round 3 of the 2023 AFL season, Serong won his second Glendinning–Allan Medal as the best player on ground in Western Derby 56, polling a maximum nine votes. He also received a perfect 10 coaches votes.

In Round 5, Serong collected a career-best 37 disposals and was best afield in a narrow win over Gold Coast, which was played at Norwood Oval in Adelaide, due to the AFL's inaugural Gather Round. He would beat this record by one disposal in Round 16 against the Western Bulldogs.

Serong finished the season having played all but one game and won his first best and fairest award, the Doig Medal. He was also awarded his first All-Australian selection, named on the interchange bench of the 2023 All-Australian team. He was the league leader in total disposals for the home-and-away season, with 675 from 22 games, and ranked in the top-five for both contested possessions and clearances.

=== 2024 ===
In Round 1 of the 2024 AFL season, Serong broke the Fremantle Football Club record for most disposals in a single game, recording a season-high 46 disposals against the Brisbane Lions at Optus Stadium. He achieved the feat despite being tagged in the second half of the game by Lions player Deven Robertson. He was again one of Fremantle's best players the next round against North Melbourne at Marvel Stadium, collecting a game-high 35 disposals and eight clearances. In Round 8, Serong recorded 37 disposals and a club-record 17 clearances during Fremantle's 24-point win over the Western Bulldogs at Optus Stadium.

Serong won his third Glendinning–Allan Medal for best on ground in Western Derby 59, collecting 32 disposals, 10 clearances and kicking a goal. He played his 100th game the next week against the Essendon Bombers at the MCG, and broke the league record for most consecutive games with 20 or more disposals during the match, with 71 consecutive games; the record was previously held by Jack Macrae at 70 games. Following the 2024 AFL season, Serong was selected once again for a spot in the All-Australian team and won his second Doig Medal, joining fellow Fremantle greats Peter Bell, Matthew Pavlich and Nat Fyfe as back-to-back winners of the Fremantle best and fairest award. He also broke the club record for most clearances in a season, with 175.

=== 2025 ===
In Round 3 of the 2025 AFL season, Serong won his fourth Glendinning-Allan Medal for best on ground in Western Derby 60, equaling the record also held by Fremantle great Paul Hasleby. Following the 2025 AFL season, Serong won the Doig Medal for the third year in a row, becoming just the second player in Fremantle's history to win three consecutive best and fairest awards, with the other being Matthew Pavlich. He also received his third All-Australian selection in as many years, named on the interchange bench of the 2025 All-Australian team.

=== 2026 ===
In February, Serong signed a seven-year contract extension, keeping him at Fremantle until at least 2034. He was also picked to play for Victoria in the revised State of Origin match against Western Australia. Following the home-and-away season, Serong played his 150th game in a preliminary final against Sydney at the SCG, spending parts of it matched up on his younger brother, Jai.

== Family ==
Caleb's younger brother, Jai Serong, also plays in the AFL for Sydney, having originally been drafted by Hawthorn in the 2021 AFL draft.

== Statistics ==
Updated to the end of the preliminary final, 2026.

Legend
G	Goals	K	Kicks	D	Disposals	T	Tackles
B	Behinds	H	Handballs	M	Marks
†	Led the league for the season

Season	Team	No.	Games	Totals							Averages (per game)							Votes
Season	Team	No.	Games	G	B	K	H	D	M	T	G	B	K	H	D	M	T	Votes
2020 (Note: The 2020 season was played with 17 home-and-away matches per team (down from 22) and 16-minute quarters with time on (down from 20-minute quarters with time on) due to the impact of the COVID-19 pandemic.)	Fremantle	22	14	2	1	127	109	236	32	60	0.1	0.1	9.1	7.8	16.9	2.3	4.3	1
2021	Fremantle	3	22	8	10	279	224	503	64	72	0.4	0.5	12.7	10.2	22.9	2.9	3.3	5
2022	Fremantle	3	22	5	9	272	309	581	57	96	0.2	0.4	12.4	14.0	26.4	2.6	4.4	5
2023	Fremantle	3	22	4	10	337	338	675^{†}	72	109	0.2	0.5	15.3	15.4	30.7	3.3	5.0	24
2024	Fremantle	3	23	11	9	315	361	676	66	114	0.5	0.4	13.7	15.7	29.4	2.9	5.0	28
2025	Fremantle	3	24	7	6	331	326	657	41	114	0.3	0.3	13.8	13.6	27.4	1.7	4.8	25
2026	Fremantle	3	23	11	6	308	256	564	55	108	0.5	0.3	13.4	11.1	24.5	2.4	4.7	14
Career			150	48	51	1969	1923	3892	387	673	0.3	0.3	13.1	12.8	25.9	2.6	4.5	102

== Honours and achievements ==
Team

- AFL minor premiership: 2026 (Fremantle)

Individual

- 3x Doig Medal: 2023, 2024, 2025
- 3x All-Australian: 2023, 2024, 2025
- AFL Rising Star: 2020
- AFLPA Best First Year Player Award: 2020
- AFLCA Best Young Player Award: 2021
- AFL Goal of the Year: 2021
- 4x Glendinning–Allan Medal: 2021 (round 22), 2023 (round 3), 2024 (round 20), 2025 (round 3)
- 22under22 team: 2022, 2023
