= Trent Rivers =

Australian football league player

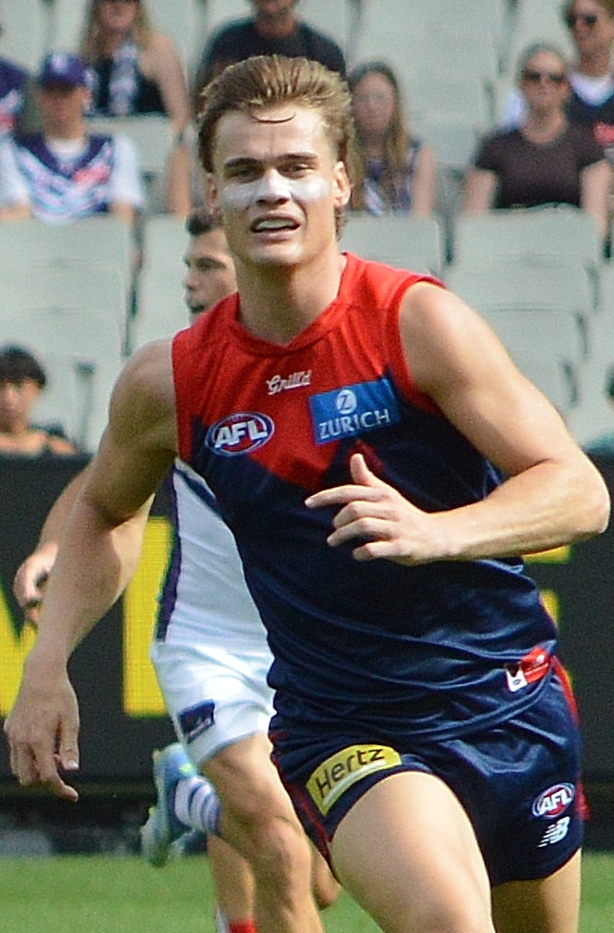
- Rivers in April 2025

Personal information
- Full name: Trent Rivers
- Born: 30 July 2001 (age 25); Fremantle, Western Australia
- Original team: East Fremantle (WAFL)
- Draft: No. 32, 2019 national draft
- Debut: 13 June 2020, Melbourne vs. Carlton, at Marvel Stadium
- Height: 188 cm (6 ft 2 in)
- Weight: 88 kg (194 lb)
- Position: Defender / midfielder

Club information
- Current club: West Coast
- Number: 24

Playing career^{1}
Years	Club	Games (Goals)
2020–2026	Melbourne	140 (16)
2027–	West Coast	0 (0)
Total		140 (16)

Representative team honours
Years	Team	Games (Goals)
2026	Western Australia	1 (0)
- ^{1} Playing statistics correct to the end of 2026.

Career highlights
- AFL premiership player: 2021; 22under22 team: 2021; Rising Star nominee: 2021

Trent Rivers (born 30 July 2001) is an Australian rules footballer who plays for the West Coast Eagles in the Australian Football League (AFL). He was recruited by the Melbourne Demons with the 32nd draft pick in the 2019 AFL draft.

== Early football and life ==
Rivers represented Western Australia at the AFL Under 18 Championships for two seasons, where he ended up winning under-18 All Australian selection. He also played for the East Fremantle Sharks for the 2019 season in the colts division. Prior he played local football for Bullcreek Leeming Junior Football Club. He was educated at Leeming Senior High School.

== AFL career ==
Rivers debuted in the Demons' one-point win over the Carlton Blues in the second round of the 2020 AFL season. He collected 12 disposals, 3 marks and 2 tackles. Rivers signed a contract extension in October 2020, keeping him at the club until 2023. Josh Mahoney, Melbourne's then general manager of football, stated "Trent has already shown signs of what he’s capable of and we couldn’t have asked more from him this season. We look forward to his continued development over the next three years."

Rivers earned a Rising star nomination in round 11 of the 2021 AFL season, after collecting 19 disposals, seven intercepts and 326 metres gained.

During the 2026 trade period, after seven seasons and 140 games at Melbourne, Rivers was traded alongside former skipper Jack Viney to the West Coast Eagles.

== Statistics ==
Updated to the end of round 22, 2026.

Legend
G	Goals	K	Kicks	D	Disposals	T	Tackles
B	Behinds	H	Handballs	M	Marks

Season	Team	No.	Games	Totals							Averages (per game)							Votes
Season	Team	No.	Games	G	B	K	H	D	M	T	G	B	K	H	D	M	T	Votes
2020 (Note: The 2020 season was played with 17 home-and-away matches per team (down from 22) and 16-minute quarters with time on (down from 20-minute quarters with time on) due to the impact of the COVID-19 pandemic.)	Melbourne	24	9	2	2	75	48	123	28	14	0.2	0.2	8.3	5.3	13.7	3.1	1.6	0
2021^{#}	Melbourne	24	25	1	1	241	137	378	101	39	0.0	0.0	9.6	5.5	15.1	4.0	1.6	0
2022	Melbourne	24	18	2	0	150	94	244	66	29	0.1	0.0	8.3	5.2	13.6	3.7	1.6	0
2023 (Note: 2023 statistics include one game in which Rivers was substituted out of the game (round 6) and was replaced by Bailey Laurie.)	Melbourne	24	25	2	5	307	190	497	119	55	0.1	0.2	12.3	7.6	19.9	4.8	2.2	0
2024	Melbourne	24	23	2	2	305	185	490	122	60	0.1	0.1	13.3	8.0	21.3	5.3	2.6	7
2025	Melbourne	24	23	4	8	303	188	491	125	57	0.2	0.3	13.2	8.2	21.3	5.4	2.5	0
2026	Melbourne	24	14	3	3	178	116	294	73	29	0.2	0.2	12.7	8.3	21.0	5.2	2.1	0
Career			137	16	21	1559	958	2517	634	283	0.1	0.2	11.4	7.0	18.4	4.6	2.1	7

== Honours and achievements ==
Team

- AFL premiership player (Melbourne): 2021
- McClelland Trophy (Melbourne): 2021

Individual

- 22under22 team: 2021
- AFL Rising Star nominee: 2021 (Round 11)
