= Tom Green (footballer, born 2001) =

Australian rules footballer

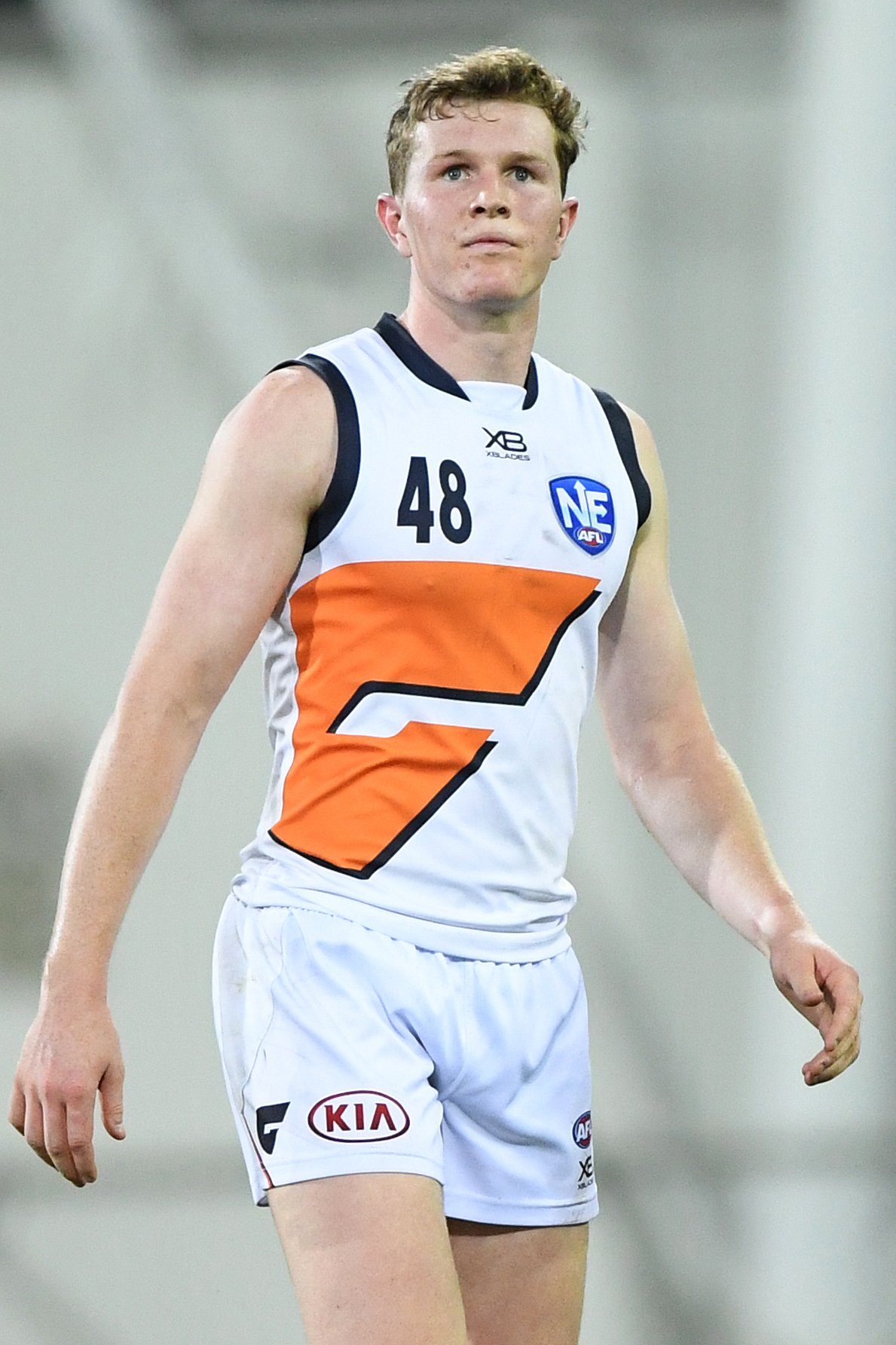
- Green during the 2019 NEAFL season

Personal information
- Full name: Thomas Green
- Born: 23 January 2001 (age 25); Townsville, Queensland
- Original teams: Eastlake (ACT); GWS Giants Academy
- Draft: No. 10, 2019 national draft
- Debut: Round 1, 2020, Greater Western Sydney vs. Geelong, at Sydney Showground Stadium
- Height: 192 cm (6 ft 4 in)
- Weight: 92 kg (203 lb)
- Position: Midfielder

Club information
- Current club: Greater Western Sydney
- Number: 12

Playing career^{1}
Years	Club	Games (Goals)
2020–	Greater Western Sydney	115 (49)
- ^{1} Playing statistics correct to the end of the 2025 season.

Career highlights
- Kevin Sheedy Medalist: 2025; 2× AFL Rising Star nominee: 2020, 2021; 22under22 team: 2023

Tom Green (born 23 January 2001) is a professional Australian rules footballer playing for the Greater Western Sydney Giants in the Australian Football League (AFL).

== Early life ==
Green was born in Townsville, Queensland. He spent his early years moving between Townsville, Toowoomba, Darwin, Melbourne and Tamworth due to his father's career as an army helicopter pilot. In year 6 at the age of 11, he settled in Canberra where he tried an array of sports which included Australian rules football, basketball, cricket and rugby union. He attended Marist College in Canberra.

Green became a member of the GWS Giants Academy at the age of 12 and worked his way through the local junior ranks. He received an NAB Under-18 All Australian selection in his final year of junior football and was also nominated for the 2019 NEAFL Rising Star Award.

== AFL career ==
Greater Western Sydney used their No. 10 pick in the 2019 national draft to recruit Green. Carlton made a bid for him but the Giants were able to match it. He made his AFL debut in Round One of the 2020 AFL season.

Green had a breakthrough season in 2021, including being nominated for the 2021 AFL Rising Star in Round Nine.

In 2022, Green finished in the top three in the Kevin Sheedy Medal. In 2023, he was elevated to the Giants' leadership group and led the AFL in both average disposals per game (32) and average contested possessions (14.95). He earned a spot in the All-Australian squad for the first time, as well as a tie for runner-up in the Kevin Sheedy Medal. In 2024, he once again finished runner-up in the Kevin Sheedy Medal and finished second in the AFL for total disposals.

After two runner-up finishes, Green broke through for his first Kevin Sheedy Medal in 2025. He was named in the initial 2025 All-Australian squad alongside teammates Sam Taylor, Finn Callaghan and Lachie Ash, but once again missed selection in the final team.

After three consecutive years in the club's leadership group, Green was elevated to the position of vice-captain in 2026, a role he shared with Connor Idun and Jack Buckley, while Toby Greene continued his captaincy.

Green tore his left ACL during pre-season training in February, ruling him out of the entire 2026 AFL season.

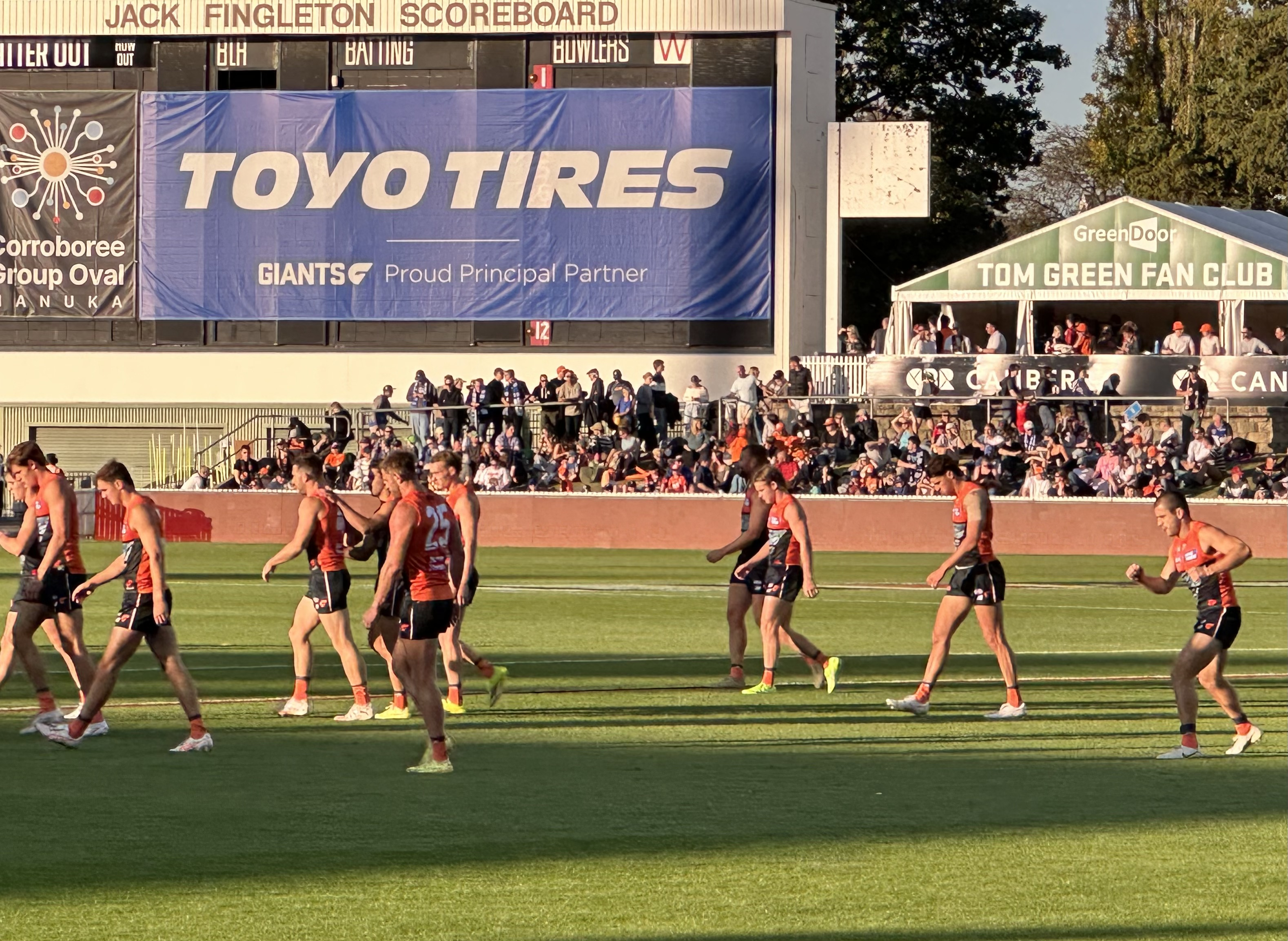
The Tom Green Fan Club stand (right) at Manuka Oval in Canberra

=== Controversy ===
In July 2024, Green was reprimanded by the Australian Football League for comments he made on a since-deleted club podcast criticizing Match Review Officer Michael Christian and the AFL Tribunal. This came in the wake of teammate Toby Bedford receiving a three-match suspension for a dangerous tackle on Tim Taranto, which was later overturned on appeal.

== Personal life ==
Green is the eldest of four brothers: Lachlan, William and Josh Green. His mother is Melanie and his father Richard is in the Australian army. Richard was a talented junior footballer playing in the First XVIII for Xavier College in Melbourne.

Green's grandfather, Michael, is a four-time premiership player with the Richmond Tigers and is a member of Richmond's Team of the 20th Century. His great uncle is St Kilda and Subiaco premiership player Brian Sierakowski. His cousins are former AFL players David Sierakowski and Will Sierakowski.

== Statistics ==
Updated to the end of the 2025 season.

Legend
G	Goals	K	Kicks	D	Disposals	T	Tackles
B	Behinds	H	Handballs	M	Marks
†	Led the league for the season

Season	Team	No.	Games	Totals							Averages (per game)							Votes
Season	Team	No.	Games	G	B	K	H	D	M	T	G	B	K	H	D	M	T	Votes
2020 (Note: The 2020 season was played with 17 home-and-away matches per team (down from 22) and 16-minute quarters with time on (down from 20-minute quarters with time on) due to the impact of the COVID-19 pandemic.)	Greater Western Sydney	12	6	1	3	31	60	91	15	13	0.2	0.5	5.2	10.0	15.2	2.5	2.2	0
2021	Greater Western Sydney	12	18	7	6	139	220	359	54	53	0.4	0.3	7.7	12.2	19.9	3.0	2.9	6
2022	Greater Western Sydney	12	21	10	9	222	289	511	58	89	0.5	0.4	10.6	13.8	24.3	2.8	4.2	4
2023	Greater Western Sydney	12	22	9	1	312	393	705	75	111	0.4	0.0	14.2	17.9	32.0^{†}	3.4	5.0	16
2024	Greater Western Sydney	12	25	9	3	334	436^{†}	770	75	101	0.4	0.1	13.4	17.4	30.8	3.0	4.0	27
2025	Greater Western Sydney	12	23	13	11	306	378	684	69	84	0.6	0.5	13.3	16.4	29.7	3.0	3.7	20
Career			115	49	33	1344	1776	3120	346	451	0.4	0.3	11.7	15.4	27.1	3.0	3.9	73
