= Hayden Young =

Australian rules footballer (born 2001)

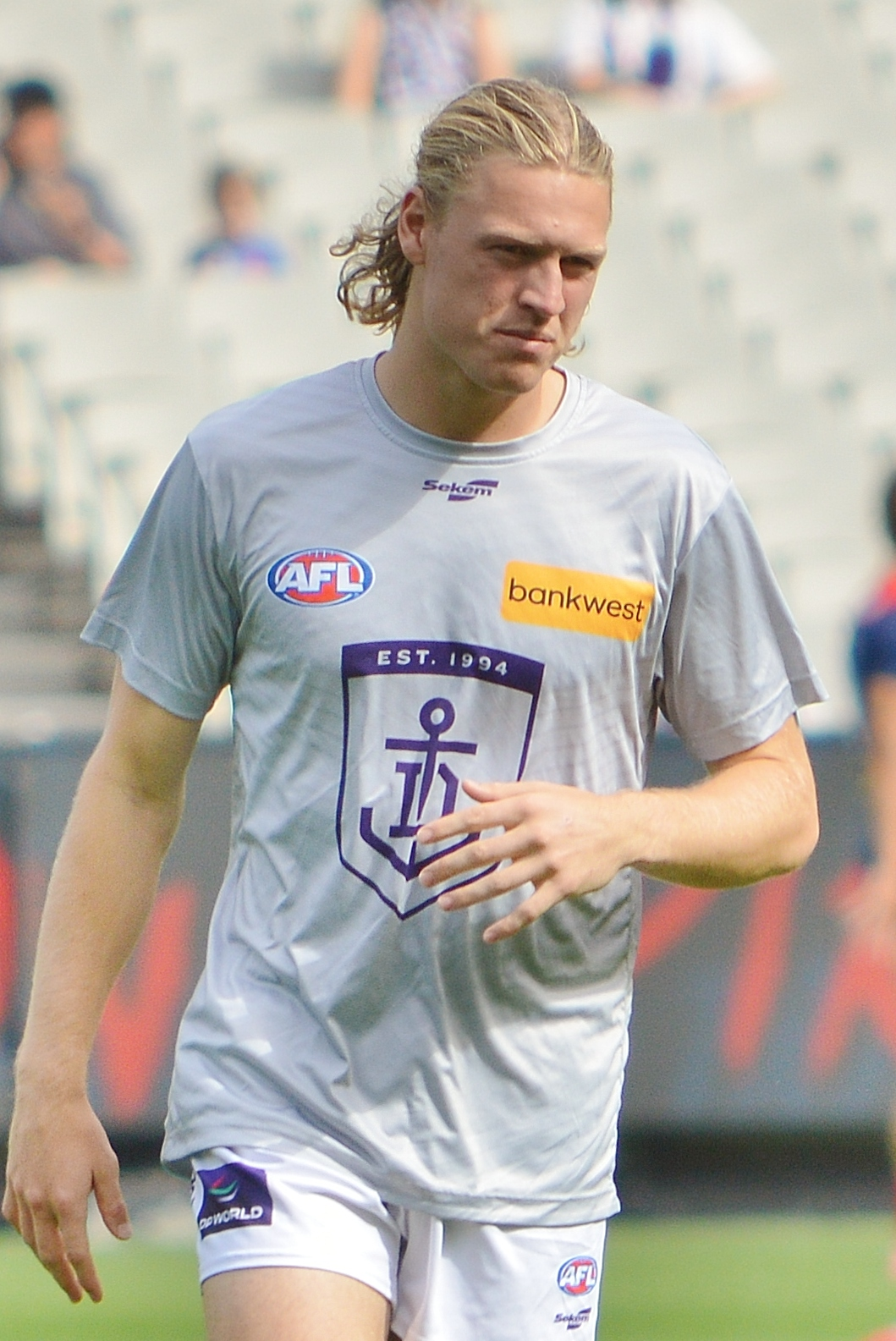
- Young in April 2025

Personal information
- Full name: Hayden Young
- Born: 11 April 2001 (age 25)
- Original team: Dandenong Stingrays (TAC Cup)
- Draft: No. 7, 2019 National draft, Fremantle
- Height: 189 cm (6 ft 2 in)
- Weight: 88 kg (194 lb)
- Position: Midfielder

Club information
- Current club: Fremantle
- Number: 26

Playing career^{1}
Years	Club	Games (Goals)
2020–	Fremantle	106 (32)
- ^{1} Playing statistics correct to the end of the preliminary finals, 2026.

Career highlights
- AFL Rising Star nominee (2021); 22under22 team: 2022, 2023; Glendinning-Allan Medal: (Round 20, 2025)

Hayden Young (born 11 April 2001) is an Australian rules footballer who plays for the Fremantle Football Club in the Australian Football League (AFL).

== Early life and career ==
Drafted with the 7th selection in the 2019 AFL draft from the Dandenong Stingrays in the NAB League, Young is the younger brother of former Western Bulldogs and North Melbourne player Lachie Young, and the older brother of Josh Young, who currently plays for South Fremantle in the West Australian Football League. He was considered to be one of the best kicks in his draft class. He attended high school at Mornington Secondary College.

== AFL career ==
=== Fremantle (2020–) ===
==== 2020 season ====
Young made his AFL debut for Fremantle in the long-delayed second round of the 2020 AFL season at The Gabba against Brisbane, as a late replacement for Nathan Wilson. Young only played five games in 2020, due to an ankle injury sustained during Fremantle's clash against St Kilda.

==== 2021 season ====
In 2021, he played the opening three games before a bad hamstring injury kept him out of the team for most of the year. He returned in Round 19, before playing the best game of his career in Fremantle's upset win over Richmond in round 20 and received the Rising Star nomination.

==== 2022 season ====
The 2022 AFL season saw Young play a career-best 22 games, highlighted by multiple 31 disposal performances against St Kilda, Richmond and Hawthorn. Young kicked his first goal in Fremantle's 78-point win over North Melbourne in Round 8. He signed a four-year contract extension mid-season, tying him to Fremantle until at least the end of the 2027 season. He was one of Fremantle's better players during their elimination final against the Western Bulldogs at Optus Stadium, collecting 28 disposals.

==== 2023 season ====
Prior to the 2023 AFL season, Young was promoted to Fremantle's leadership group. Late in the 2023 season against Geelong at Kardinia Park, Fremantle opted for a strategic move by sending Young, a young defender at the time, to tag midfielder and Geelong captain Patrick Dangerfield. The move would prove to be successful with Young collecting 19 disposals whilst also quelling Patrick's influence. He played a similar role the following week when he was sent to tag eventual 2023 Brownlow Medalist Lachie Neale, restricting him to 25 disposals. The round 22 Western Derby saw Young spend the entirety of the game in the midfield, collecting 25 disposals and a game-high eight inside 50s in what was a 101-point thumping over the Eagles.

==== 2024 season ====
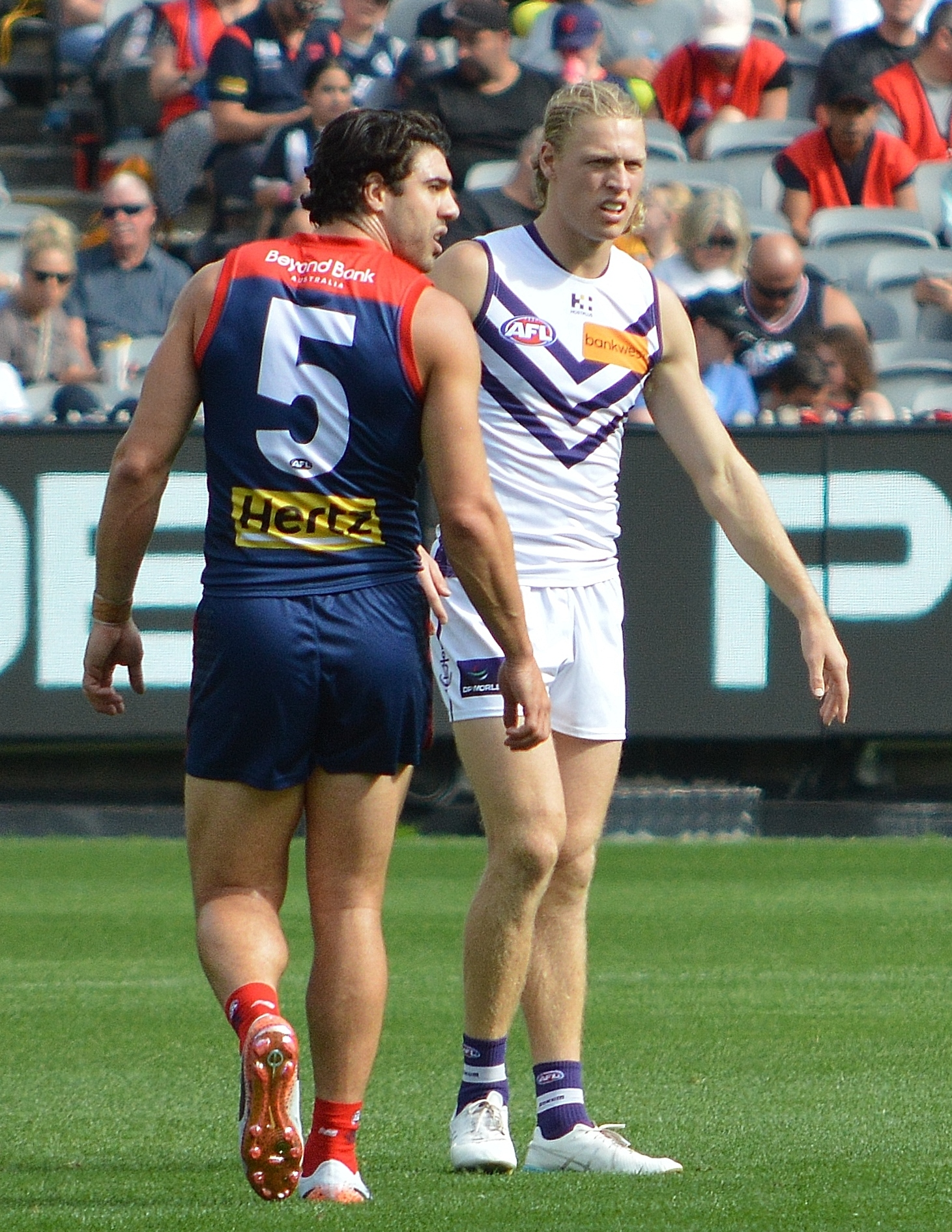
Young matched up on Christian Petracca in Round 6 of the 2025 AFL season at the MCG.

After a strong pre-season, Young was named on the extended interchange for Fremantle's opening game of the year against the Brisbane Lions. He was impressive collecting 24 disposals and a game-high 10 tackles in the 23-point come from behind win. He collected a game-high 32 disposals two weeks later in Round 3 against Adelaide at Optus Stadium. Arguably his best game of the season was against Richmond at the MCG, he had 30 disposals and kicked two late last quarter goals in the 54-point win. After the match he polled a perfect 10 coaches' votes.

Young was one of five Fremantle players named in the initial 44-man 2024 All-Australian team at the end of the season. He also finished third place in the Dockers' best and fairest count, polling 200 votes. Already contracted until 2027, Young signed a six-year contract extension on the 18th of December, making him the longest-contracted player in the league at the time of writing.

==== 2025 season ====
During pre-season training in February, Young suffered a low-grade hamstring injury, causing him to miss the first four matches of the season. He played his first game in Round 5 against Richmond; however, by the end of Round 8 he had again re-injured the same hamstring, requiring surgery.

Young made his return from injury in Round 19 against Collingwood. He was awarded the Glendinning–Allan Medal the following week for a best on ground performance in Western Derby 61, collecting 23 disposals, seven clearances, and kicking three goals. He won the award despite being substituted out of the game in the fourth quarter, with Fremantle holding a comfortable lead and opting to manage his recent return from injury. In Round 21, Young suffered a groin injury, missing two games. He returned in Round 24 and also played in the elimination final against Gold Coast.

==== 2026 season ====
In Round 1 of the 2026 AFL season against Geelong at GMHBA Stadium, Young suffered a minor hamstring strain, causing him to miss the next four games.. He missed a further five games during the Home & Away season either injured or 'managed' - given his history of soft-tissue injuries, the club opted for a cautious approach to ensure he would be fully fit for Fremantle's Finals campaign. The club finishing Minor Premiers for the 2nd time in club history, but suffered a 32-pt loss to Hawthorn in their home Qualifying Final, ramping up pressure on the side. Against Geelong in the semi-final, Young scored a stunning solo goal from a centre bounce in the 2nd term; he received four coaches' votes for that game. Against Sydney in the Prelim Final at the SCG, trailing by 27 pts, he kicked a set shot after the 3/4 time siren, from 50m on the boundary, after Fremantle had gone without a goal over the previous 25 minutes. With 28 disposals and six other score involvements, Young received eight coaches' votes.

== Statistics ==
Updated to the Preliminary Final, 2026.

Legend
G	Goals	K	Kicks	D	Disposals	T	Tackles
B	Behinds	H	Handballs	M	Marks

Season	Team	No.	Games	Totals							Averages (per game)							Votes
Season	Team	No.	Games	G	B	K	H	D	M	T	G	B	K	H	D	M	T	Votes
2020 (Note: The 2020 season was played with 17 home-and-away matches per team (down from 22) and 16-minute quarters with time on (down from 20-minute quarters with time on) due to the impact of the COVID-19 pandemic.)	Fremantle	26	5	0	0	33	17	50	16	7	0.0	0.0	6.6	3.4	10.0	3.2	1.4	0
2021	Fremantle	26	8	0	0	85	42	127	45	19	0.0	0.0	10.6	5.3	15.9	5.6	2.4	0
2022	Fremantle	26	22	1	1	306	196	502	164	50	0.0	0.0	13.9	8.9	22.8	7.5	2.3	5
2023	Fremantle	26	22	1	2	323	169	492	105	86	0.0	0.1	14.7	7.7	22.4	4.8	3.9	5
2024	Fremantle	26	23	13	10	301	247	548	76	123	0.6	0.4	13.1	10.7	23.8	3.3	5.3	12
2025	Fremantle	26	9	7	0	84	67	151	18	28	0.8	0.0	9.3	7.4	16.8	2.0	3.1	3
2026	Fremantle	26	17	10	5	172	153	325	66	54	0.6	0.3	10.1	9.0	19.1	3.9	3.2	0
Career			106	32	18	1304	891	2195	490	367	0.3	0.2	12.3	8.4	20.7	4.6	3.5	25
