= Cody Weightman =

Australian football league player

Personal information
- Nickname: Flea
- Born: 15 January 2001 (age 25); Melbourne, Victoria
- Original team: Dandenong Stingrays/Haileybury/Beaconsfield
- Draft: No. 15, 2019 AFL draft, Western Bulldogs
- Debut: 17 July 2020, Western Bulldogs vs. Essendon, at Metricon Stadium
- Height: 177 cm (5 ft 10 in)
- Weight: 73 kg (161 lb)
- Position: Forward

Club information
- Current club: Western Bulldogs
- Number: 3

Playing career^{1}
Years	Club	Games (Goals)
2020–	Western Bulldogs	87 (133)
- ^{1} Playing statistics correct to the end of the 2026 season.

Career highlights
- 22under22 team: 2023; AFL Rising Star nominee: 2021

Cody Weightman (born 15 January 2001) is an Australian rules footballer who plays for the Western Bulldogs in the Australian Football League (AFL). He was recruited by the Western Bulldogs with the 15th draft pick in the 2019 AFL draft.

== Early life ==
Weightman was born in Melbourne and grew up on a farm in Pakenham on the outskirts of Melbourne. He participated in the Auskick program at Officer. He played his junior football for Beaconsfield. Weightman captained his school's first XVIII side at Haileybury, where he was coached by Australian Football Hall of Famer Matthew Lloyd. He also played for the Dandenong Stingrays in the NAB League, and was selected to play for Vic Country in the AFL Under 18 Championships.

Weightman played 4 games with Vic Country, and had two stand-out games. His first came against the Allies on 9 June 2019, where he kicked 4 goals, had 16 disposals and 6 marks to help his team to a 97-point victory. He also had another 4-goal haul against South Australia on 28 June 2019, his 4 goals and 12 disposals helping the team get over the line by a singular point. He was selected for the 2019 Under-18 All Australian side on the interchange bench, after he kicked the most goals out of any player in the tournament, finishing with 9 from 4 games.

In 2018, Weightman was named best on ground in the South East Football Netball League (SEFNL) under-19s grand final while playing for Beaconsfield.

After finishing his schooling, Weightman went to Bali in Indonesia, where he played for the Bali Geckos, describing it as a way "just to decompress". Weightman was noted as a heavily determined player, reportedly obtaining a vertical jumping test before the AFL Draft Combine in order to perfect his jumping technique to gain an advantage of other potential draftees. Most phantom drafts had Weightman being taken with either Melbourne's 12th pick in the draft, or the Western Bulldogs' 15th pick, and eventually he was taken by the latter.

== AFL career ==
When arriving at the Bulldogs, Weightman donned the number 19 guernsey, the number previously worn by former player Lukas Webb. Weightman debuted in the Bulldogs' 42 point win over the Essendon Bombers in the 7th round of the 2020 AFL season, against friend and former teammate Ned Cahill. In his first game, he picked up 2 goals, 9 disposals and 3 marks. Weightman's first disposal was a banana kick with which he kicked a goal. After kicking just 1 goal in his next two games, Weightman was omitted from the side and did not return for the remainder of the season.

Weightman was kept to the VFL for the start of the 2021 AFL season. He had a standout game in the VFL against Carlton's reserves side, where he took a spectacular mark over Ryley Stoddart which grabbed the attention of seniors coach Luke Beveridge. After playing just 3 games in the 2020 season, Weightman returned to the team in Round 9, where he was instrumental in the team's close win over Port Adelaide at Adelaide Oval. He kicked two goals in the first quarter, and then kicked the winning goal with only a few minutes remaining by snapping it over his head into the goals. He earned the praise of captain Marcus Bontempelli, who stated "His pressure and his tackling and finishing were exceptional. It's great to see him get some reward." His winning goal earned a Goal of the year nomination for round 9. The next week, Weightman was nominated for the 2021 AFL Rising Star award after his 2-goal, 14 disposal, 11 score-involvement performance against St Kilda. Weightman had a career best game against North Melbourne, where he kicked four goals, three of them coming in the first quarter. It was revealed Weightman had signed a two-year contract extension with the Western Bulldogs on 20 July 2021, tying him to the club until the end of the 2023 season. Weightman earned a Mark of the Year nomination in round 19, after he took a spectacular mark on top of Melbourne ruckman Max Gawn. The mark drew lots of media attention and was branded as a contender to win the annual award. Weightman was one of the team's most important players in their 49-point elimination final victory over Essendon, kicking four goals to help them break away from the Bombers. After his 4-goal performance in the final, Weightman was subjected to abuse on social media platforms, prompting teammate Josh Bruce to defend him on Twitter. Weightman managed to kick 1 goal in the team's thrilling semi-final victory over Brisbane Lions. Unfortunately, he was substituted out of the game for a head knock, after which he developed concussion symptoms, ruling him out of the Preliminary final the following week. Weightman played in the grand final, but had a quiet game as the Bulldogs ended up losing to Melbourne, picking up just seven disposals. After the conclusion of the season, it was revealed that Weightman had played through an ankle injury which he incurred during the pre-season throughout the year.

== Personal life ==
In his spare time, Weightman enjoys wakeboarding and surfing, and has also learned to paint. He grew up supporting Collingwood.

Weightman drew much controversy in an event where a wardrobe malfunction lead to him revealing himself to players and fans.

== Statistics ==
Updated to the end of round 22, 2026.

Legend
G	Goals	K	Kicks	D	Disposals	T	Tackles
B	Behinds	H	Handballs	M	Marks

Season	Team	No.	Games	Totals							Averages (per game)							Votes
Season	Team	No.	Games	G	B	K	H	D	M	T	G	B	K	H	D	M	T	Votes
2020 (Note: The 2020 season was played with 17 home-and-away matches per team (down from 22) and 16-minute quarters with time on (down from 20-minute quarters with time on) due to the impact of the COVID-19 pandemic.)	Western Bulldogs	19	3	3	1	11	7	18	4	4	1.0	0.3	3.7	2.3	6.0	1.3	1.3	0
2021	Western Bulldogs	19	16	26	13	120	40	160	48	30	1.6	0.8	7.5	2.5	10.0	3.0	1.9	1
2022	Western Bulldogs	19	21	36	10	131	57	188	55	40	1.7	0.5	6.2	2.7	9.0	2.6	1.9	0
2023	Western Bulldogs	3	19	34	18	139	59	198	54	52	1.8	0.9	7.3	3.1	10.4	2.8	2.7	2
2024	Western Bulldogs	3	17	27	17	116	66	182	43	60	1.6	1.0	6.8	3.9	10.7	2.5	3.5	2
2025	Western Bulldogs	3	0	—	—	—	—	—	—	—	—	—	—	—	—	—	—	0
2026	Western Bulldogs	3	7	3	5	54	33	87	16	15	0.4	0.7	7.7	4.7	12.4	2.3	2.1	0
Career			83	129	64	571	262	833	220	201	1.6	0.8	6.9	3.2	10.0	2.7	2.4	5

== Honours and achievements ==
- 22under22 team: 2023
- AFL Rising Star nominee: 2021
