= 2024 All-Australian team =

Honorary Australian rules football team

The 2024 All-Australian team represents the best performed Australian Football League (AFL) players during the 2024 season. It was announced in August as a complete Australian rules football team of 22 players. The team is honorary and does not play any games.

== Selection panel ==
The selection panel for the 2024 All-Australian team consisted of chairman Andrew Dillon, Eddie Betts, Jude Bolton, Nathan Buckley, Kane Cornes, Abbey Holmes, Glen Jakovich, Matthew Pavlich, Laura Kane and Josh Mahoney.

== Team ==
=== Initial squad ===
The initial 44-man All-Australian squad was announced on 26 August, with all clubs except Adelaide and Richmond having at least one player nominated.

Brisbane Lions and Fremantle had the most players selected in the initial squad with 5. Ten players from the 2023 team were selected.

Club	Total	Player(s)
Adelaide	0	
Brisbane Lions	5	Harris Andrews, Joe Daniher, Lachie Neale, Cameron Rayner, Dayne Zorko
Carlton	4	Patrick Cripps, Charlie Curnow, Harry McKay, Jacob Weitering
Collingwood	2	Darcy Cameron, Nick Daicos
Essendon	1	Zach Merrett
Fremantle	5	Andrew Brayshaw, Jordan Clark, Luke Ryan, Caleb Serong, Hayden Young
Geelong	3	Jeremy Cameron, Max Holmes, Tyson Stengle
Gold Coast	2	Noah Anderson, Sam Collins
Greater Western Sydney	3	Brent Daniels, Jesse Hogan, Lachie Whitfield
Hawthorn	3	Massimo D'Ambrosio, Dylan Moore, James Sicily
Melbourne	1	Max Gawn
North Melbourne	2	Harry Sheezel, Tristan Xerri
Port Adelaide	3	Zak Butters, Jason Horne-Francis, Dan Houston
Richmond	0	
St Kilda	1	Jack Sinclair
Sydney	4	Nick Blakey, Errol Gulden, Isaac Heeney, Chad Warner
West Coast	2	Jeremy McGovern, Jake Waterman
Western Bulldogs	3	Marcus Bontempelli, Bailey Dale, Adam Treloar

=== Final team ===
The final team was announced on Thursday, 29 August.

2024 All-Australian team
B:	Nick Blakey (Sydney)	Jacob Weitering (Carlton)	Luke Ryan (Fremantle)
HB:	Dayne Zorko (Brisbane Lions)	Jeremy McGovern (West Coast)	Dan Houston (Port Adelaide)
C:	Errol Gulden (Sydney)	Marcus Bontempelli (Western Bulldogs) (captain)	Nick Daicos (Collingwood)
HF:	Chad Warner (Sydney)	Jeremy Cameron (Geelong)	Isaac Heeney (Sydney)
F:	Jake Waterman (West Coast)	Jesse Hogan (Greater Western Sydney)	Dylan Moore (Hawthorn)
Foll:	Max Gawn (Melbourne)	Patrick Cripps (Carlton) (vice-captain)	Caleb Serong (Fremantle)
Int:	Lachie Whitfield (Greater Western Sydney)	Lachie Neale (Brisbane Lions)	Adam Treloar (Western Bulldogs)
Int:	Zak Butters (Port Adelaide)		
Coach:	Chris Fagan (Brisbane Lions)		

Note: the position of coach in the All-Australian team is traditionally awarded to the coach of the premiership team.
