= Darryl Cox (footballer) =

Australian rules footballer (born 1961)

Personal information
- Full name: Darryl Cox
- Born: 26 January 1961 (age 65)
- Original team: Regent Scouts
- Height: 192 cm (6 ft 4 in)
- Weight: 85 kg (187 lb)
- Position: Defender

Playing career^{1}
Years	Club	Games (Goals)
1980–1983	Fitzroy	16 (8)
1984–1986	Melbourne	13 (7)
1987	Brisbane Bears	1 (1)
Total		30 (16)
- ^{1} Playing statistics correct to the end of 1987.

Darryl Cox (born 26 January 1961) is a former Australian rules footballer who played with Fitzroy, Melbourne and the Brisbane Bears in the Victorian Football League (VFL) during the 1980s.

Cox, a defender, was never able to command regular selection and did not play more than eight games (mainly due to injury) in any one season. He started out at Fitzroy, playing 16 games in four years and missing the entire 1981 season.

At Melbourne, his second club, he played 13 games in three seasons.

His finished his career in Brisbane, where he was a member of the Bears initial VFL squad and played his only game in round two against Geelong.

His daughter, Montana Cox is an Australian fashion model, and his son Nikolas plays football for Essendon.
