= Justin McInerney =

Australian rules footballer

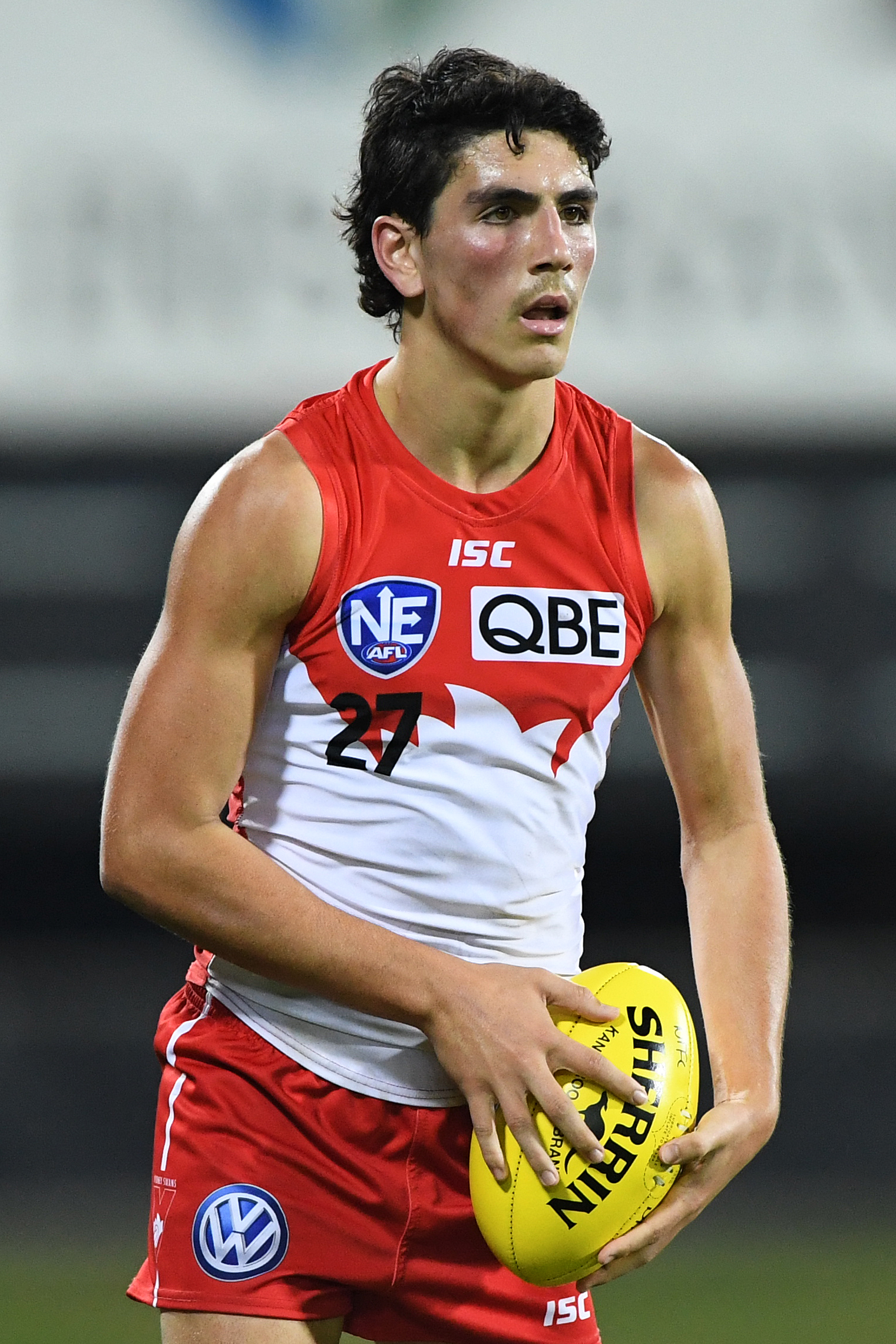
- McInerney in 2019

Personal information
- Full name: Justin McInerney
- Nickname: Juzzy
- Born: 18 August 2000 (age 26)
- Original team: Northern Knights (TAC Cup)
- Draft: No. 44, 2018 AFL draft, Sydney
- Height: 189 cm (6 ft 2 in)
- Weight: 73 kg (161 lb)
- Position: Midfielder

Club information
- Current club: Sydney
- Number: 27

Playing career^{1}
Years	Club	Games (Goals)
2019–	Sydney	122 (59)
- ^{1} Playing statistics correct to the end of round 22, 2026.

Career highlights
- 2× AFL Rising Star nominee: 2020, 2021

Justin McInerney (born 18 August 2000) is a professional Australian rules footballer who plays for the Sydney Swans in the Australian Football League (AFL).

== Early life ==
McInerney was raised in the northern suburbs of Melbourne and participated in the Auskick program at Macleod, Victoria.

He was educated at Marcellin College and played junior football with the Northern Knights in the TAC Cup.

McInerney was recruited by the Sydney Swans with the 44th draft pick in the 2018 AFL draft.

== Family ==
Justin has two older siblings- Chris and Beck, and parents John and Lila.

== AFL career ==
He made his debut against Melbourne in round 4 of the 2019 AFL season. McInerney received a Rising Star nomination for his performance against the Melbourne Football Club in Round 15 of the 2020 AFL season. In that game McInerney kicked 2 goals, collected 14 disposals and took 5 marks.

== Statistics ==
Updated to the end of round 22, 2026.

Legend
G	Goals	K	Kicks	D	Disposals	T	Tackles
B	Behinds	H	Handballs	M	Marks

Season	Team	No.	Games	Totals							Averages (per game)							Votes
Season	Team	No.	Games	G	B	K	H	D	M	T	G	B	K	H	D	M	T	Votes
2019	Sydney	27	1	0	0	1	0	1	0	2	0.0	0.0	1.0	0.0	1.0	0.0	2.0	0
2020 (Note: The 2020 season was played with 17 home-and-away matches per team (down from 22) and 16-minute quarters with time on (down from 20-minute quarters with time on) due to the impact of the COVID-19 pandemic.)	Sydney	27	9	5	0	60	65	125	26	13	0.6	0.0	6.7	7.2	13.9	2.9	1.4	0
2021	Sydney	27	21	7	2	229	150	379	113	23	0.3	0.1	10.9	7.1	18.0	5.4	1.1	0
2022	Sydney	27	22	6	4	247	138	385	104	23	0.3	0.2	11.2	6.3	17.5	4.7	1.0	2
2023	Sydney	27	19	13	5	183	142	325	87	42	0.7	0.3	9.6	7.5	17.1	4.6	2.2	0
2024	Sydney	27	20	6	8	204	174	378	107	46	0.3	0.4	10.2	8.7	18.9	5.4	2.3	0
2025	Sydney	27	17	8	10	192	173	365	89	30	0.5	0.6	11.3	10.2	21.5	5.2	1.8	0
2026	Sydney	27	13	14	12	127	177	304	54	33	1.1	0.9	9.8	13.6	23.4	4.2	2.5	0
Career			122	59	41	1243	1019	2262	580	212	0.5	0.3	10.2	8.4	18.5	4.8	1.7	2

== Honours and achievements ==
Individual

- 2× AFL Rising Star nominee: 2020 (round 15), 2021 (round 16)
