= Braeden Campbell =

Australian football league player

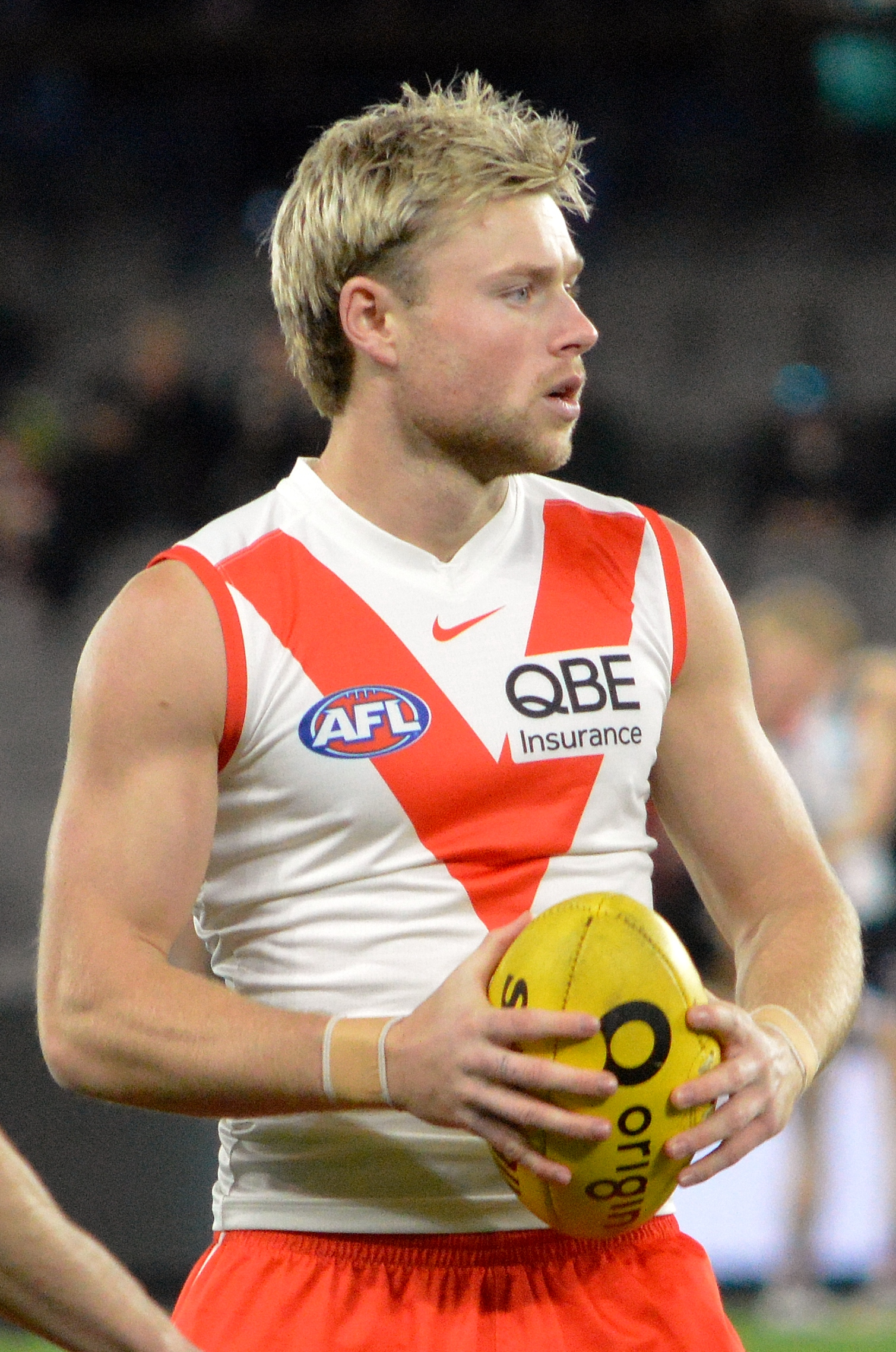
- Campbell in August 2026

Personal information
- Full name: Braeden Campbell
- Born: February 4, 2002 (age 24)
- Original team: Pennant Hills Football Club(AFL Sydney)/Sydney Swans Academy
- Draft: No. 5, 2020 AFL draft, Sydney
- Debut: 20 March 2021, Sydney vs. Brisbane Lions, at The Gabba
- Height: 181 cm (5 ft 11 in)
- Weight: 79 kg (174 lb)
- Position: Defender

Club information
- Current club: Sydney
- Number: 16

Playing career^{1}
Years	Club	Games (Goals)
2021–	Sydney	98 (34)
- ^{1} Playing statistics correct to the end of round 22, 2026.

Braeden Campbell (born 4 February 2002) is an Australian rules footballer who plays for the Sydney Swans in the Australian Football League (AFL). He was recruited by the Sydney Swans with the 5th draft pick in the 2020 AFL draft. after the Swans matched a bid from Hawthorn.

== Early football and life ==
Campbell was a Westbrook Juniors AFL Club player who progressed through to Pennant Hills Senior AFL club as a junior then elevated into the Premier Division team. He won the club's Best First Year player award in the 2020 season.

Campbell grew up in the Sydney suburb of Cherrybrook and attended Knox Grammar.

== AFL career ==
Campbell debuted in the opening round of the 2021 AFL season, starring for Sydney in a 31-point win over the Brisbane Lions. In his second game, he earned himself a Rising Star nomination for his 25 disposal performance against the Adelaide Crows.

== Statistics ==
Updated to the end of round 22, 2026.

Legend
G	Goals	K	Kicks	D	Disposals	T	Tackles
B	Behinds	H	Handballs	M	Marks

Season	Team	No.	Games	Totals							Averages (per game)							Votes
Season	Team	No.	Games	G	B	K	H	D	M	T	G	B	K	H	D	M	T	Votes
2021	Sydney	16	8	1	2	71	41	112	26	11	0.1	0.3	8.9	5.1	14.0	3.3	1.4	0
2022	Sydney	16	17	2	2	102	39	141	36	31	0.1	0.1	6.0	2.3	8.3	2.1	1.8	0
2023	Sydney	16	23	8	9	238	123	361	99	63	0.3	0.4	10.3	5.3	15.7	4.3	2.7	0
2024	Sydney	16	23	5	6	158	80	238	74	54	0.2	0.3	6.9	3.5	10.3	3.2	2.3	0
2025	Sydney	16	23	16	18	172	112	284	72	69	0.7	0.8	7.5	4.9	12.3	3.1	3.0	0
2026	Sydney	16	4	2	2	37	37	74	11	12	0.5	0.5	9.3	9.3	18.5	2.8	3.0	0
Career			98	34	39	778	432	1210	318	240	0.3	0.4	7.9	4.4	12.3	3.2	2.4	0

== Honours and achievements ==
Individual

- AFL Rising Star nominee: 2021 (round 2)
