= 2021 AFL Rising Star =

Australian football award

2021 NAB AFL Rising Star
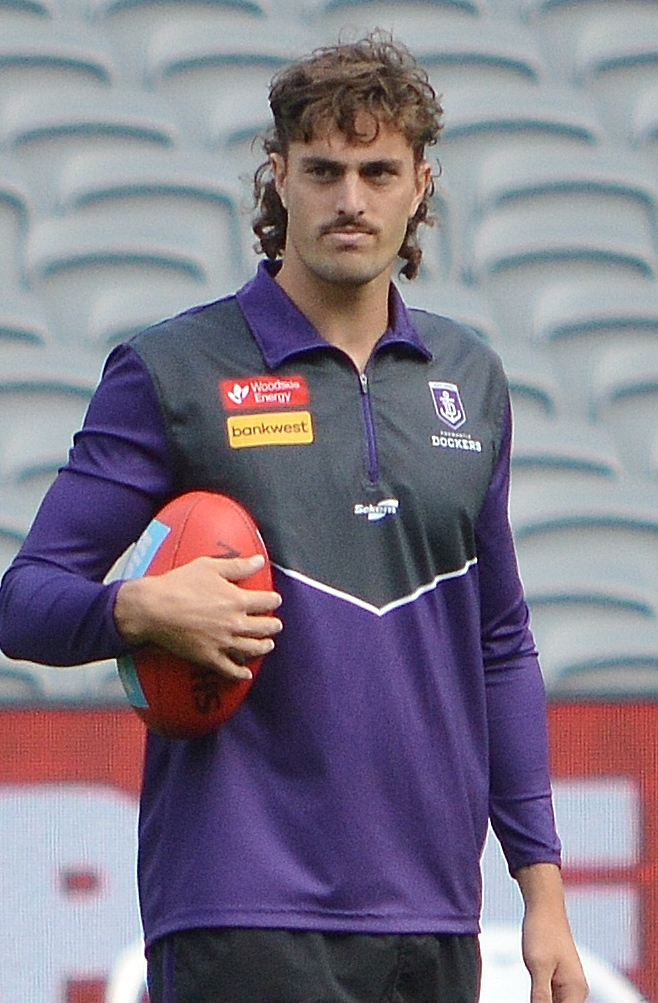
- Luke Jackson, recipient of the 2021 Rising Star award
- Sponsored by: National Australia Bank
- Country: Australia
- Ron Evans medallist: Luke Jackson (Melbourne)

The NAB AFL Rising Star award is given annually to a standout young player in the Australian Football League (AFL).

== Eligibility ==
Every round, a nomination is given to a standout young player who performed well during that particular round. To be eligible for nomination, a player must be under 21 on 1 January of that year and have played ten or fewer senior games before the start of the season; a player who is suspended may be nominated, but is not eligible to win the award.

== Nominations ==
2021 AFL Rising Star nominees
Round	Player	Club	Ref.
1	Errol Gulden	Sydney	
2	Braeden Campbell	Sydney	
3	Chad Warner	Sydney	
4	Lachlan Sholl	Adelaide	
5	Mitch Georgiades	Port Adelaide	
6	Jacob Koschitzke	Hawthorn	
7	Luke Jackson	Melbourne	
8	James Jordon	Melbourne	
9	Tom Green	Greater Western Sydney	
10	Cody Weightman	Western Bulldogs	
11	Trent Rivers	Melbourne	
12	Nikolas Cox	Essendon	
13	Riley Thilthorpe	Adelaide	
14	Harrison Jones	Essendon	
15	Deven Robertson	Brisbane Lions	
16	Justin McInerney	Sydney	
17	Archie Perkins	Essendon	
18	Jeremy Sharp	Gold Coast	
19	Harry Schoenberg	Adelaide	
20	Hayden Young	Fremantle	
21	Miles Bergman	Port Adelaide	
22	Jake Bowey	Melbourne	
23	Connor Idun	Greater Western Sydney	

== Final voting ==
	Player	Club	Votes
1	Luke Jackson	Melbourne	51
2	Tom Green	Greater Western Sydney	38
3	Mitch Georgiades	Port Adelaide	28
4	Justin McInerney	Sydney	16
5	Errol Gulden	Sydney	11
6	Trent Rivers	Melbourne	6
6	Harry Schoenberg	Adelaide	6
8	James Jordon	Melbourne	5
9	Cody Weightman	Western Bulldogs	2
10	Hayden Young	Fremantle	1
10	Nik Cox	Essendon	1
