= Luke Jackson (footballer) =

Australian rules footballer (born 2001)

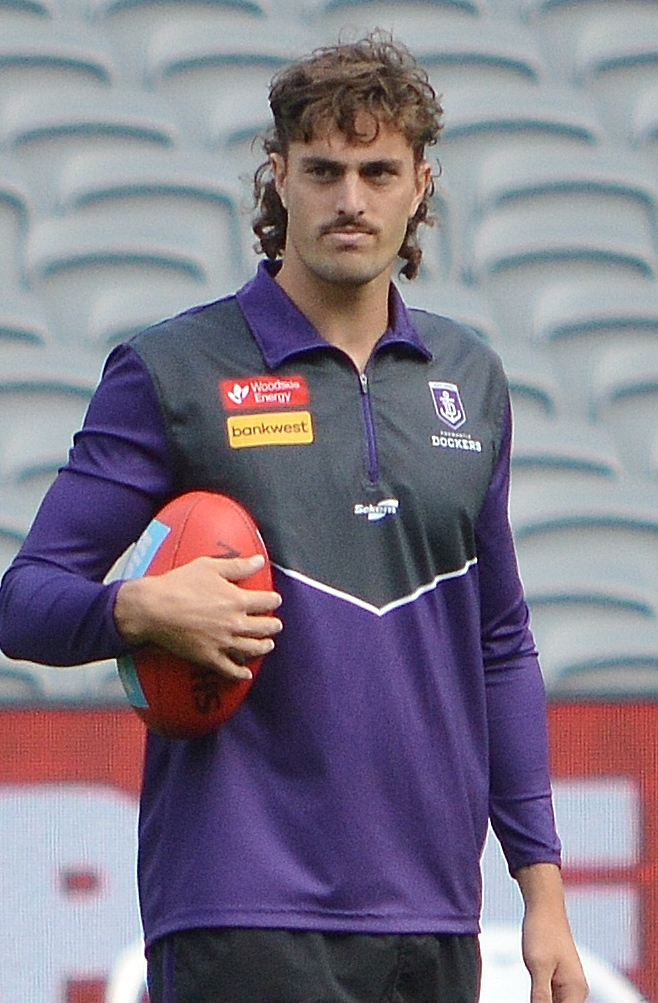
- Jackson in April 2025

Personal information
- Full name: Luke Stephen Jackson
- Nicknames: Dogga, Unicorn
- Born: 29 September 2001 (age 25); Fremantle, Western Australia
- Original team: East Fremantle
- Draft: No. 3, 2019 AFL draft, Melbourne
- Debut: 13 June 2020, Melbourne vs. Carlton, at Docklands Stadium
- Height: 199 cm (6 ft 6 in)
- Weight: 100 kg (220 lb)
- Position: Ruck / Midfielder

Club information
- Current club: Fremantle
- Number: 9

Playing career^{1}
Years	Club	Games (Goals)
2020–2022	Melbourne	52 (30)
2023–	Fremantle	93 (92)
Total		145 (122)

Representative team honours^{2}
Years	Team	Games (Goals)
2026–	Western Australia	1 (2)
- ^{1} Playing statistics correct to the end of the preliminary finals, 2026.^{2} Representative statistics correct as of 2026.

Career highlights
- AFL premiership player: 2021; Doig Medal: 2026; All-Australian team: 2026; AFL Rising Star: 2021; 4× 22under22 team: 2021, 2022, 2023, 2024; Harold Ball Memorial Trophy: 2020; AFL Rising Star nominee: 2020; Fremantle Player of the Finals: 2026

Luke Stephen Jackson (born 29 September 2001) is an Australian rules footballer who plays for Fremantle in the Australian Football League (AFL). Prior to joining Fremantle, he played for Melbourne, where he was a member of their 2021 premiership team.

Standing at 199 cm tall, Jackson plays primarily as a ruckman, but has also played as one of the tallest midfielders in the league.

== Early life ==
Jackson attended Willetton Senior High School in Perth, Western Australia. He was childhood friends with NBA draft pick Luke Travers. The pair both attended Willetton Senior together as part of their renowned basketball academy. He was also childhood friends with fellow 2019 AFL draft pick Trey Ruscoe; the pair attended the same primary school and played junior football together.

== Early basketball and football ==
In 2018, Jackson represented Australia at the Under-17 FIBA Basketball World Cup in Argentina and won gold at the Under-16 FIBA Asia Championship in China. He was named in the all-tournament team for the U16 Asian Championship. The AIS basketball program was keen for him to move to Canberra in 2019 and begin a pathway which could have led him to college in the United States.

Jackson represented Western Australia at the AFL Under 18 Championships for two seasons, where he ended up winning under-18 All Australian selection. He also played for the East Fremantle Sharks for the 2019 season in the colts division. Jackson grew up as a supporter of the Fremantle Football Club.

== AFL career ==
=== Melbourne ===
Jackson was recruited by Melbourne with pick 3 in the 2019 AFL draft. Jackson debuted in the Demons' one-point win over the Carlton Blues in the second round of the 2020 AFL season. He collected 7 disposals, 1 behind and 1 tackle. After being omitted for the next 3 rounds, Jackson re-entered the team in Round 7. He won the Rising Star nomination for Round 10. In that game he kicked 2 goals, including the opening goal. On top of that, he also collected 8 disposals, 14 hitouts and 2 marks. At the conclusion of the year he took out the Harold Ball Memorial Trophy, an award given to the best young talent for the Melbourne Demons. Jackson re-signed for a one-year contract extension at the end of the year, keeping him at the club until 2022.

Jackson became a part of a select few players in the AFL to receive two Rising Star nominations in their careers after he received a 2021 AFL Rising Star nomination for his 22 disposal, 1 goal performance in Round 7 of the 2021 AFL season, and won the award overall at the season's conclusion. Jackson was a part of Melbourne's 57 year drought breaking Grand Final victory over the Western Bulldogs.

Following Melbourne's loss to the Brisbane Lions in the 2022 semi-final, Jackson reportedly met with the club and formally requested a trade to his home state of Western Australia, however he did not nominate a specific club and allowed offers from both West Coast and Fremantle. Jackson was traded to Fremantle on 10 October for a first-round pick, a future first-round pick and a future second-round pick. Upon joining Fremantle, Jackson signed a seven year contract, tying him to the Dockers until at least 2029.

=== Fremantle ===
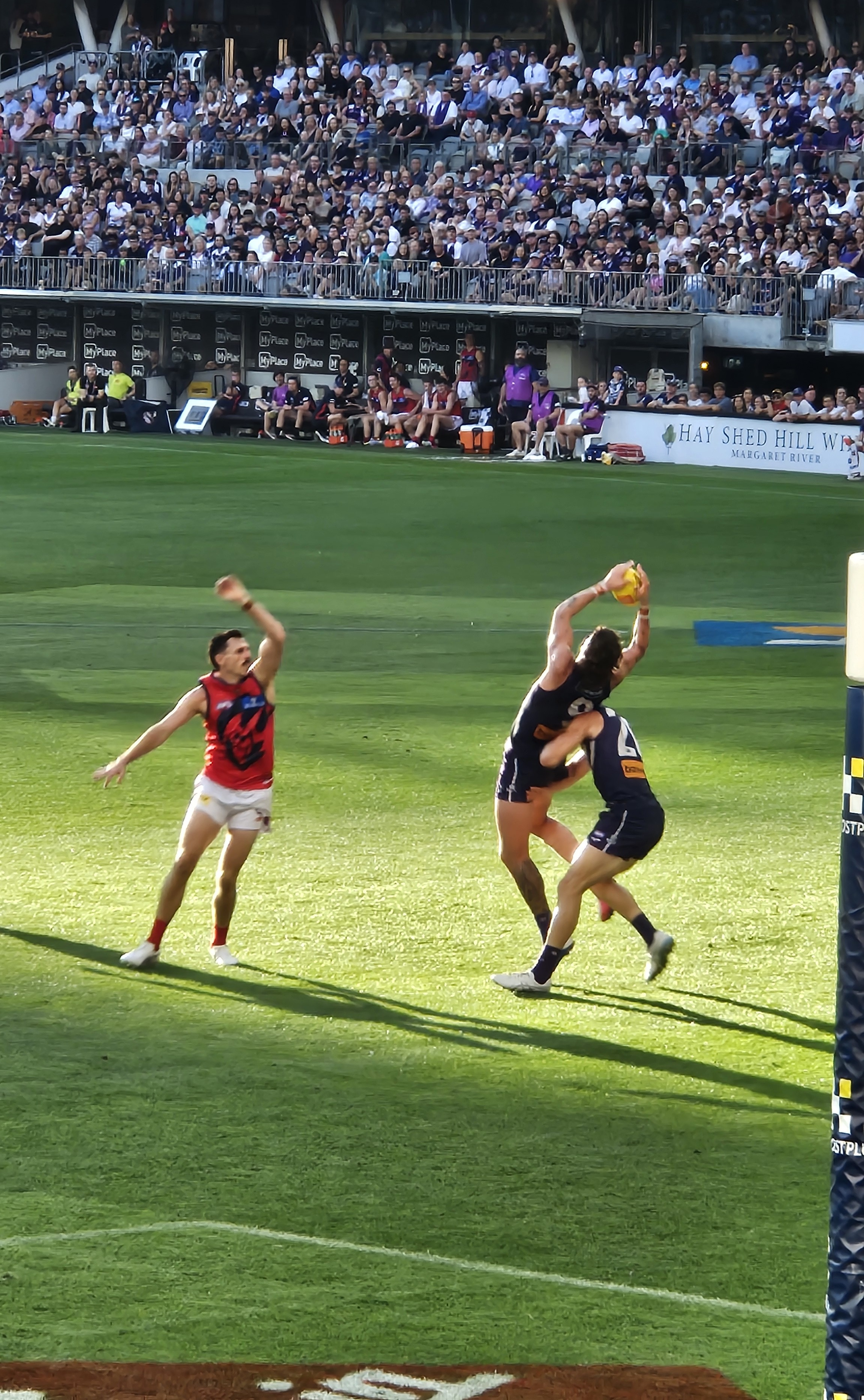
Jackson taking a mark in Round 2, 2026 against Melbourne.

He played his first game for Fremantle in Round 1 of the 2023 AFL season against St Kilda at Optus Stadium. In Round 15, Jackson recorded 17 disposals, 9 score involvements and three goals during Fremantle's 32-point win over Essendon in an arguably best-on-ground effort. Western Derby 57 saw Jackson collect 19 disposals, 26 hitouts and kick a goal in Fremantle's win over West Coast. He finished the game equal-best on ground after tying with Lachie Schultz for the Glendinning–Allan Medal, with Schultz receiving the award on a countback. He finished his first season at Fremantle with a fourth-place finish in the club's best and fairest award.

He was ranked the sixth best ruckman in the league by Nine's Wide World of Sports in February 2024. Jackson made the line-up for Fremantle's opening game of the 2024 AFL season against the Brisbane Lions at Optus Stadium. He was named as the sole ruckman, after fellow ruckman and teammate Sean Darcy was ruled out due to injury. Jackson was impressive collecting 30 hit-outs and kicking two goals in the 23-point come from behind win. He was arguably Fremantle's best player the next week against North Melbourne at Marvel Stadium, collecting 24 disposals, 21 hit-outs, two goals and 10 score involvements. He recorded 39 hit-outs, a game-high 10 clearances and collected a career-best 25 disposals in round ten against St Kilda. Jackson shared mixed duties throughout 2024, competing as both a ruck and as a forward. He finished his second year at the Dockers having played every game, and capped off a strong individual season with a top-ten finish in the club's best and fairest award.

In 2026, Jackson was picked to play for Western Australia in the revised State of Origin match against Victoria. He also received his first All-Australian selection, being named on the interchange bench of the 2026 All-Australian team.

== Statistics ==
Updated to the end of the preliminary final, 2026.

Legend
G	Goals	K	Kicks	D	Disposals	T	Tackles
B	Behinds	H	Handballs	M	Marks	H/O	Hit-outs

Season	Team	No.	Games	Totals								Averages (per game)								Votes
Season	Team	No.	Games	G	B	K	H	D	M	T	H/O	G	B	K	H	D	M	T	H/O	Votes
2020 (Note: The 2020 season was played with 17 home-and-away matches per team (down from 22) and 16-minute quarters with time on (down from 20-minute quarters with time on) due to the impact of the COVID-19 pandemic.)	Melbourne	6	6	3	2	19	33	52	9	8	28	0.5	0.3	3.2	5.5	8.7	1.5	1.3	4.7	0
2021^{#}	Melbourne	6	24	16	9	107	201	308	72	48	255	0.7	0.4	4.5	8.4	12.8	3.0	2.0	10.6	3
2022 (Note: 2022 statistics include one game in which Jackson was substituted out of the game due to injury (round 23) and was replaced by James Jordon.)	Melbourne	6	22	11	12	118	185	303	65	81	243	0.5	0.5	5.4	8.4	13.8	3.0	3.7	11.0	2
2023	Fremantle	9	23	22	19	165	181	346	78	81	406	1.0	0.8	7.2	7.9	15.0	3.4	3.5	17.7	6
2024	Fremantle	9	23	21	16	132	243	375	61	72	375	0.9	0.7	5.7	10.6	16.3	2.7	3.1	16.3	4
2025	Fremantle	9	21	20	7	153	220	373	72	87	458	1.0	0.3	7.3	10.5	17.8	3.4	4.1	21.8	17
2026	Fremantle	9	26	29	18	185	298	483	75	133	669	1.1	0.7	7.1	11.5	18.6	2.9	5.1	25.7	19
Career			145	122	83	879	1361	2240	432	510	2434	0.8	0.6	6.1	9.4	15.5	3.0	3.5	16.8	51

== Honours and achievements ==
Team

- AFL premiership player (Melbourne): 2021
- 2× AFL minor premiership: (Melbourne) 2021, (Fremantle) 2026
- McClelland Trophy (Melbourne): 2021

Individual

- Doig Medal: 2026
- AFL Rising Star nominee: 2020 (Round 10)
- All-Australian team: 2026
- Harold Ball Memorial Trophy: 2020
- 22under22 team: 2021, 2022, 2023, 2024
- AFL Rising Star: 2021
