= AFL Rising Star =

Australian rules football award

- Awarded for: The best young player in the Australian Football League
- Sponsored by: Norwich Union Australia (1993–2000); Ansett Australia (2001); National Australia Bank (2002–2022); Telstra (2023–present)
- Presented by: Australian Football League

History
- First award: 1993
- First winner: Nathan Buckley (1993)
- Most recent: Jagga Smith (2026)
- Next ceremony: August 2027
- Website: afl.com.au/rising-star

The AFL Rising Star is an Australian rules football award presented annually to the player adjudged the best and fairest young player in the Australian Football League (AFL) for the year. It was first presented in the 1993 season, and was won by Nathan Buckley, playing for the Brisbane Bears. The recipient of the AFL Rising Star has been awarded the Ron Evans Medal since 2007, named in honour of the former AFL Commission chairman following his death that year.

The award was sponsored by Norwich Union Australia from its inception in 1993 until 2000. The AFL then secured a six-year sponsorship deal with Ansett Australia in 2001 that included the Rising Star award; however, this agreement only lasted the one season following the collapse of Ansett in September 2001. National Australia Bank sponsored the award for two decades from 2002 to 2022, marking the longest commercial partnership in the award's history; they were not replaced by any sponsor for the 2023 edition. An equivalent award has existed in the AFL Women's league since its inception in 2017.

The clubs with the most AFL Rising Star awards is Fremantle, with 4 awards won by players. Greater Western Sydney's eight nominations in the 2012 season was the most any club has achieved in a season. The most recent recipient of the award is Fremantle's Murphy Reid, winning in 2025.

== Eligibility and nominations ==
A player is nominated for the award each round during the AFL season by a panel of experts. The nominee is usually chosen based on their performance in that particular round; however, for nominations closer to the end of the year, the player's performance over the whole season is taken into consideration. To be eligible for nomination, the player must be under the age of 21 at 1 January that year, and have played ten or fewer AFL games as of the start of the season. A player can only be nominated once per season; if a player is suspended during the season, he may be nominated, but will not be eligible to win the award. (Note: Under the 2005–2014 match review panel system, a player was ineligible if he was given a base sanction of 100 or more demerit points by the tribunal or match review panel, equivalent to a one-week suspension. Under some circumstances, a player could reduce a penalty from a one-week suspension (125 demerit points) to a reprimand without suspension (92.75 points) by accepting a 25 per cent reduction with an early guilty plea; as the base points sanction in this case exceeds 100, he would become ineligible for the award, despite not being suspended. This was the same eligibility criterion used in the Brownlow Medal. Since 2015, if a player is suspended for more than one match after an early plea or tribunal case, then he is ineligible to win the award.) At the completion of the regular season, each member of the voting panel independently awards five votes, four votes, three votes, two votes and one vote to the nominated players they regard as the best to fifth-best during the season; the player with the highest total of votes wins the medal.

As the number of voting members varies between seasons, the maximum number of votes a player can poll is not consistent. There have been only four winners who have accumulated the maximum votes in their season: Jared Rivers (2004), Daniel Rich (2009), Dan Hannebery (2010) and Nick Daicos (2022).

It is possible for a player to be nominated in multiple seasons, as long as he still satisfies the age and experience criteria in each year. Sixteen players have been nominated twice for a Rising Star award:

- Duncan Kellaway (1993 and 1994)
- Craig Callaghan (1995 and 1996)
- Michael Braun (1997 and 1998)
- Luke Power (1998 and 1999)
- Nathan Jones (2006 and 2007)
- Mark LeCras (2006 and 2007)
- Michael Hurley (2009 and 2010)
- Jordan Gysberts (2010 and 2011)
- Sam Blease (2011 and 2012)
- Orazio Fantasia (2015 and 2016)
- Alex Witherden (2017 and 2018)
- Lachlan Sholl (2020 and 2021)
- Mitch Georgiades (2020 and 2021)
- Luke Jackson (2020 and 2021)
- Tom Green (2020 and 2021)
- Justin McInerney (2020 and 2021)
- Jake Bowey (2021 and 2022)
- George Wardlaw (2023 and 2024)
- Nate Caddy (2024 and 2025)

== Recipients ==
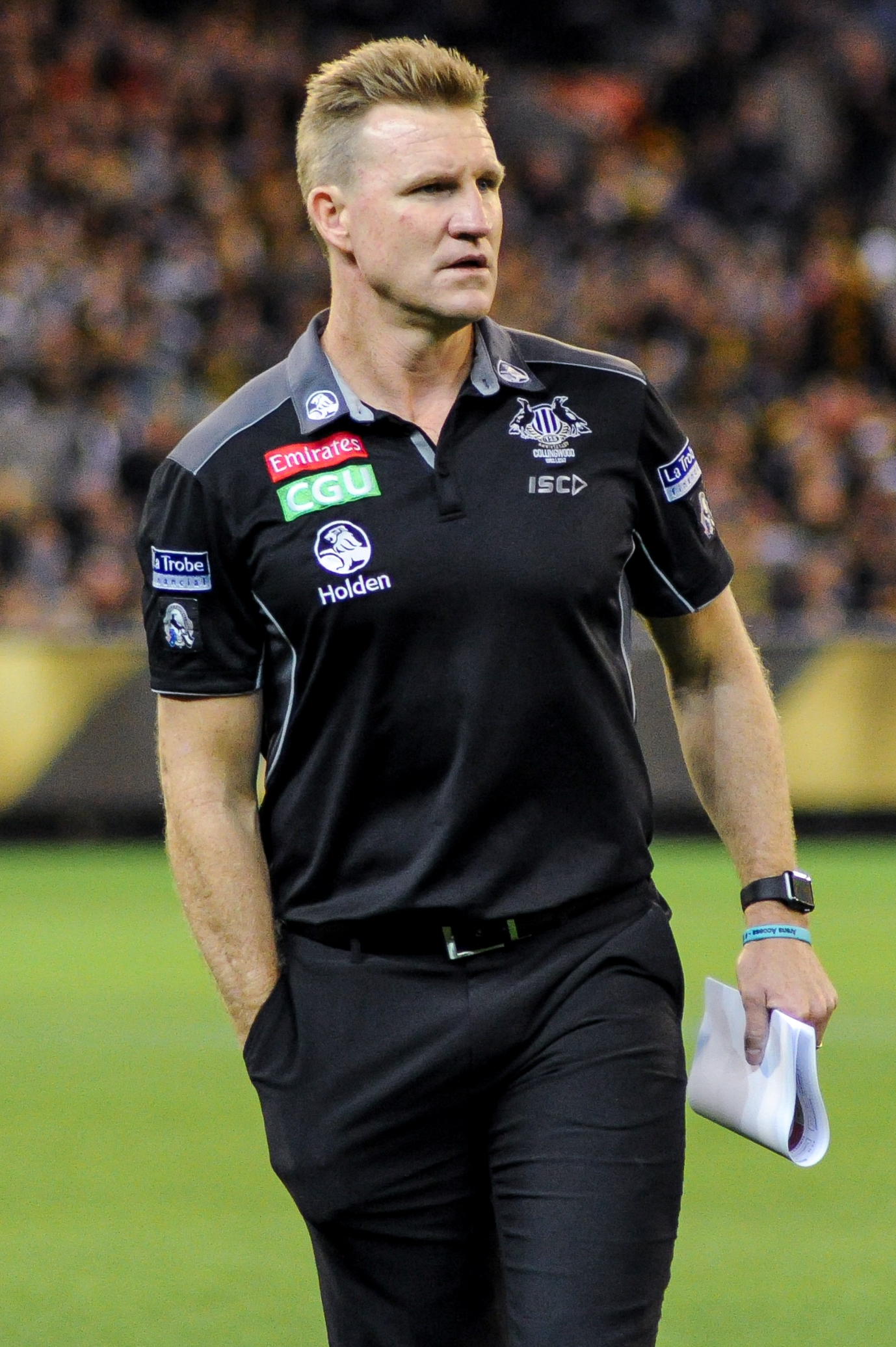
Nathan Buckley was the inaugural AFL Rising Star in 1993.

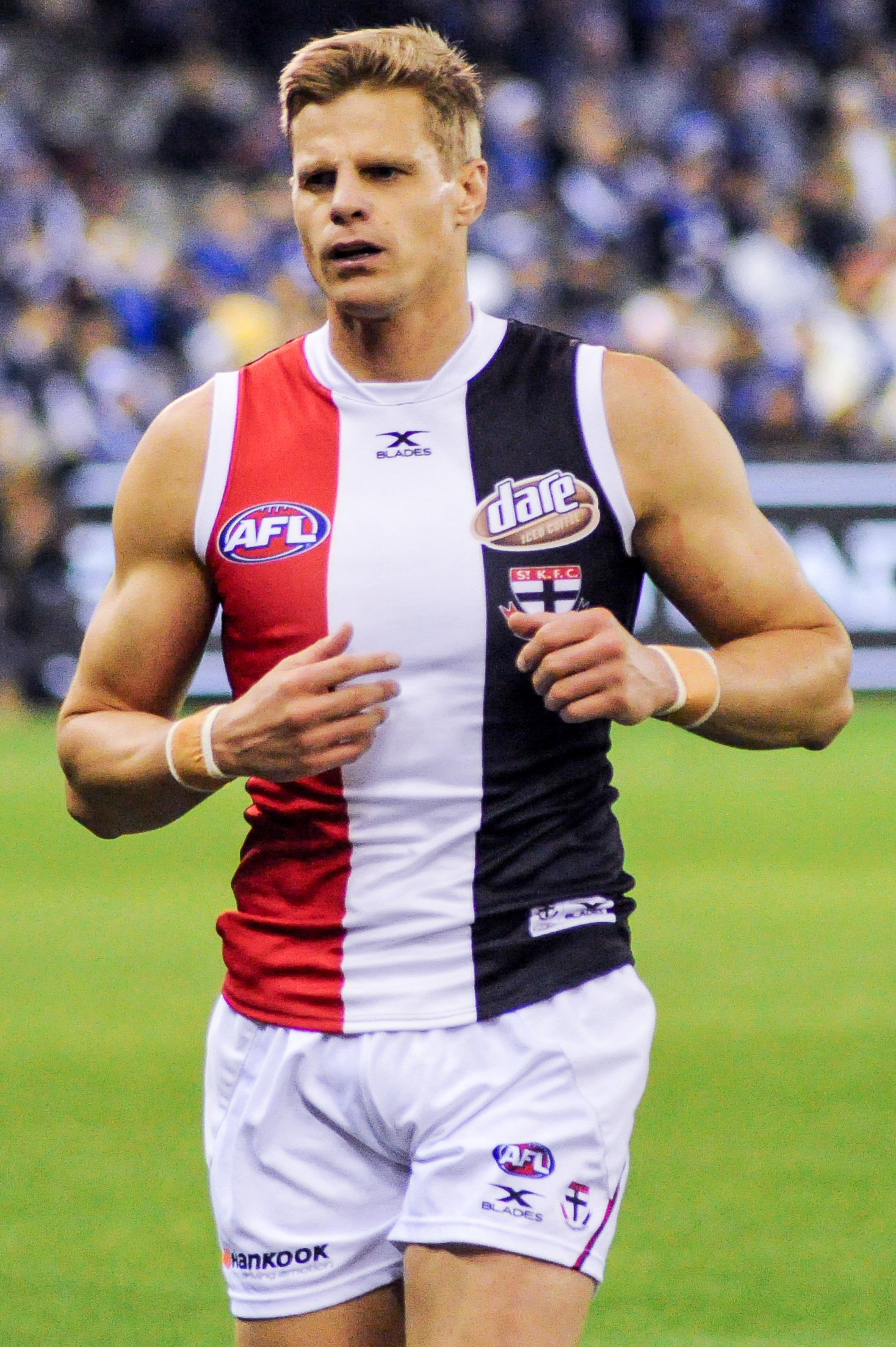
Nick Riewoldt was the 2002 AFL Rising Star.

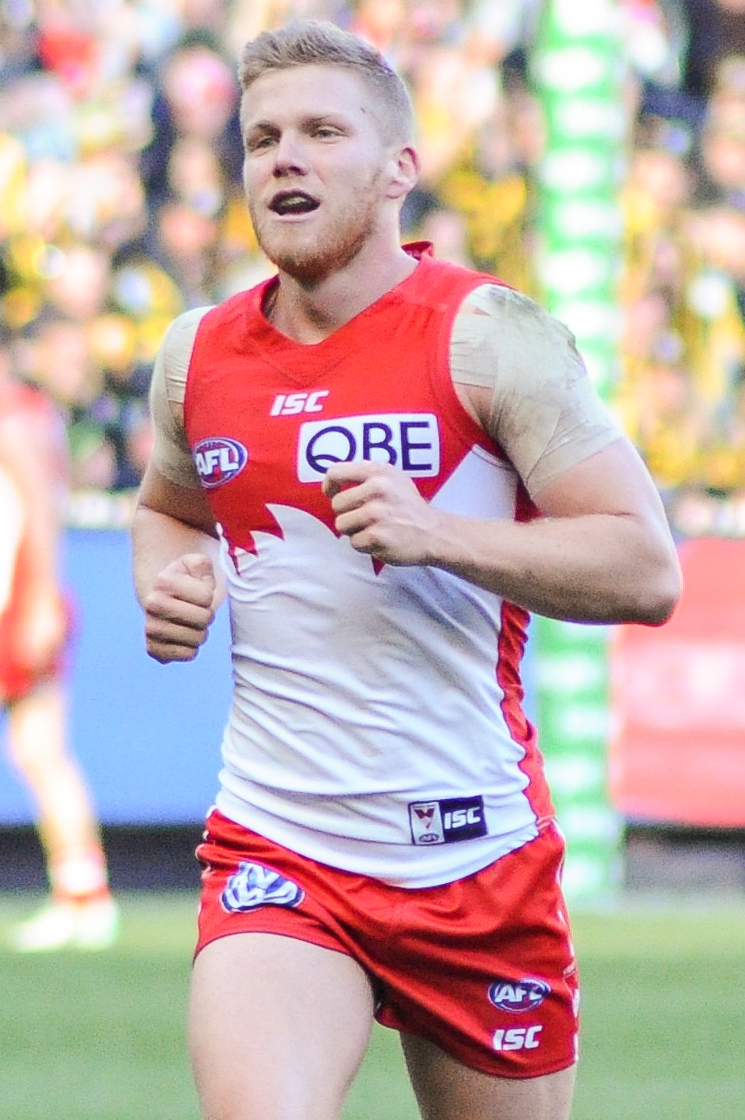
Dan Hannebery polled the maximum votes possible in the 2010 AFL Rising Star.

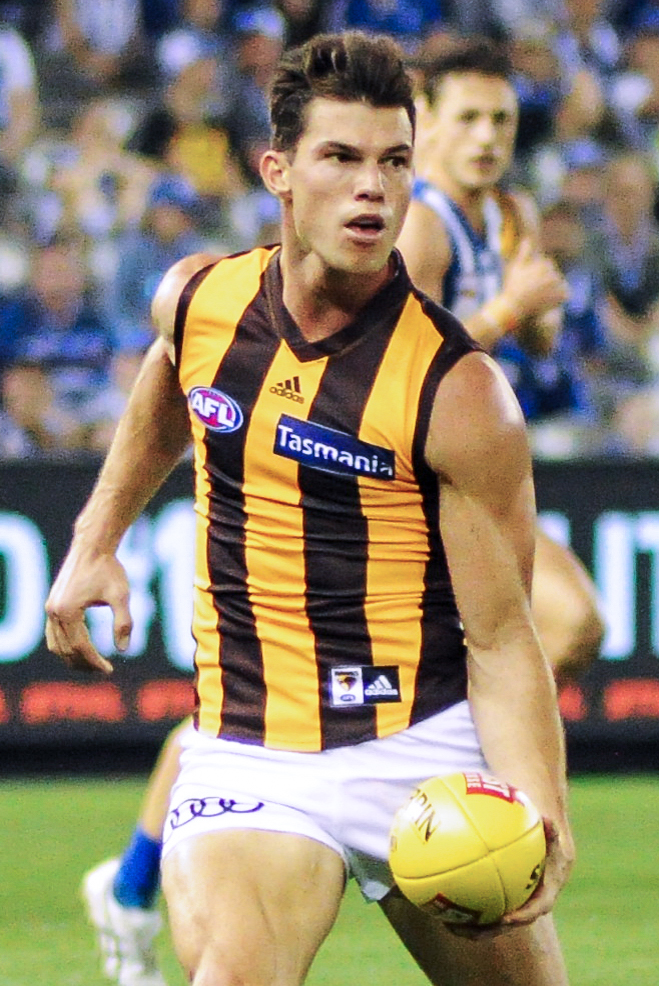
Jaeger O'Meara was the 2013 AFL Rising Star.

Table key
^	Player polled maximum votes

Table of recipients
Recipient	Year	Club	Votes	Ref.
Nathan Buckley	1993	Brisbane Bears	Unknown (Note: Voting was not made public for awards prior to 1996.)	
Chris Scott	1994	Brisbane Bears	Unknown	
Nick Holland	1995	Hawthorn	Unknown	
Ben Cousins	1996	West Coast	15	
Michael Wilson	1997	Port Adelaide	27	
Byron Pickett	1998	North Melbourne	30	
Adam Goodes	1999	Sydney	33	
Paul Hasleby	2000	Fremantle	33	
Justin Koschitzke	2001	St Kilda	31	
Nick Riewoldt	2002	St Kilda	34	
Sam Mitchell	2003	Hawthorn	33	
Jared Rivers	2004	Melbourne	45^	
Brett Deledio	2005	Richmond	43	
Danyle Pearce	2006	Port Adelaide	43	
Joel Selwood	2007	Geelong	44	
Rhys Palmer	2008	Fremantle	44	
Daniel Rich	2009	Brisbane Lions	45^	
Dan Hannebery	2010	Sydney	45^	
Dyson Heppell	2011	Essendon	44	
Daniel Talia	2012	Adelaide	43	
Jaeger O'Meara	2013	Gold Coast	44	
Lewis Taylor	2014	Brisbane Lions	39	
Jesse Hogan	2015	Melbourne	49	
Callum Mills	2016	Sydney	49	
Andrew McGrath	2017	Essendon	51	
Jaidyn Stephenson	2018	Collingwood	52	
Sam Walsh	2019	Carlton	54	
Caleb Serong	2020	Fremantle	48	
Luke Jackson	2021	Melbourne	51	
Nick Daicos	2022	Collingwood	60^	
Harry Sheezel	2023	North Melbourne	54	
Oliver Dempsey	2024	Geelong	52	
Murphy Reid	2025	Fremantle	48	
Jagga Smith	2026	Carlton	54	

=== Club totals ===
Table of clubs' totals
Club	Total	Years
Fremantle	4	2000, 2008, 2020, 2025
Sydney	3	1999, 2010, 2016
Melbourne	3	2004, 2015, 2021
Brisbane Bears	2	1993, 1994
St Kilda	2	2001, 2002
Hawthorn	2	1995, 2003
Port Adelaide	2	1997, 2006
Brisbane Lions	2	2009, 2014
Essendon	2	2011, 2017
Collingwood	2	2018, 2022
North Melbourne	2	1998, 2023
Geelong	2	2007, 2024
Carlton	2	2019, 2026
West Coast	1	1996
Richmond	1	2005
Adelaide	1	2012
Gold Coast	1	2013
Greater Western Sydney	0	—
Western Bulldogs	0	—
Fitzroy	0	—
Tasmania	0	—

== See also ==
- AFL Women's Rising Star
