= Maginnes =

Maginnes is a surname. Notable people with the surname include:

- Al Maginnes (1897–1966), football player and lawyer
- Dave Maginnes (1893–1981), American football player
- John Maginnes (born 1968), American golfer
- Nancy Maginnes, later known as Nancy Kissinger (1934–2026), American philanthropist and political aide, wife of U.S. Secretary of State Henry Kissinger

== See also ==
- Maginness, another surname
- Magin, given name and surname
