= Maginness =

Maginness is a surname. Notable people with the surname include:

- Alban Maginness (born 1950), Northern Ireland politician
- Norm Maginness (born 1933), Australian rules footballer
- Scott Maginness (born 1966), Australian rules footballer

== See also ==
- Maginnes, another surname
