= 2024 AFL season =

128th season of the Australian Football League (AFL)

2024 AFL premiership season
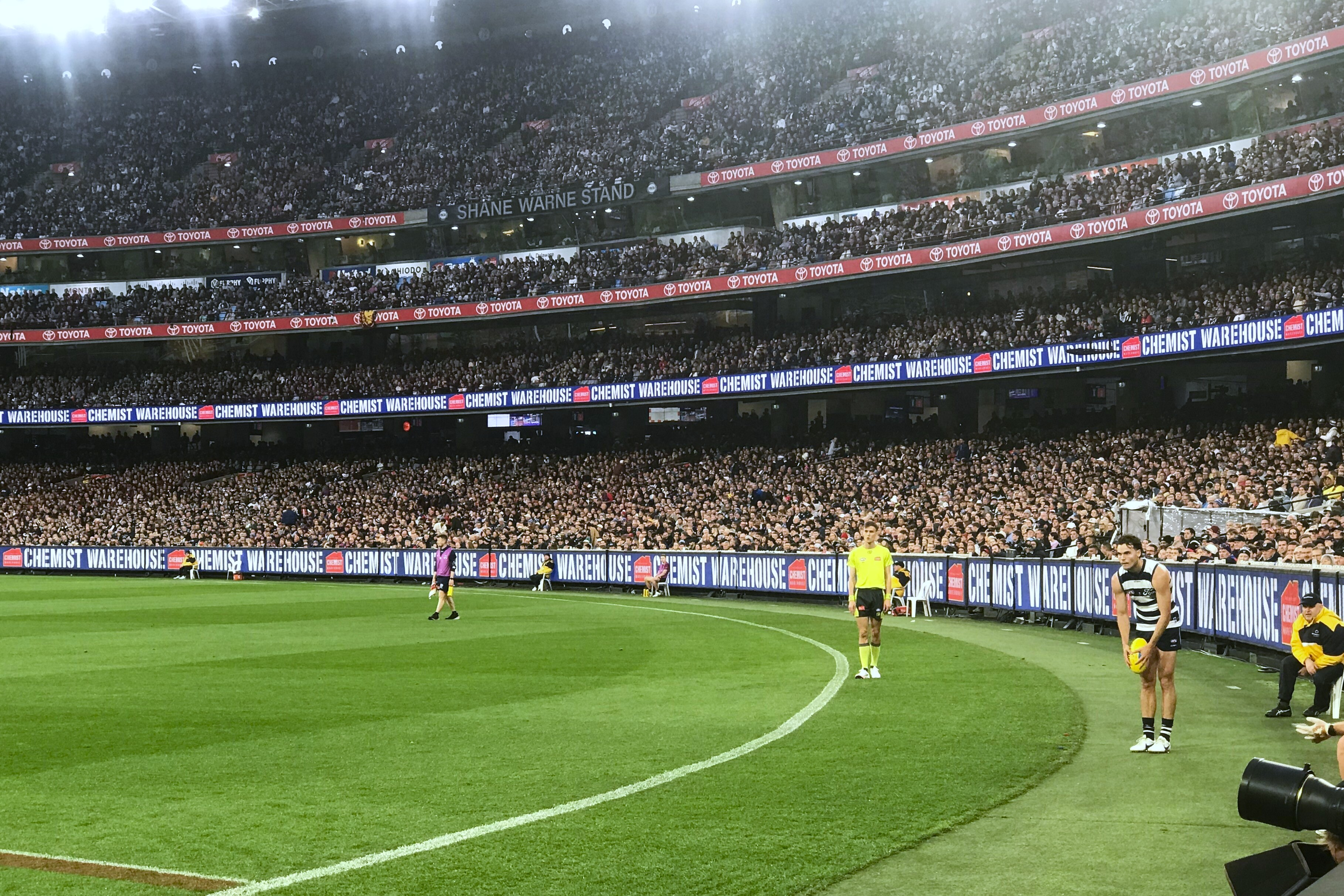
- Geelong's Jack Bowes lining up for a shot at goal during the second preliminary final

Overview
- Date: 7 March – 28 September 2024
- Teams: 18
- Premiers: Brisbane Lions; 4th premiership
- Runners-up: Sydney; 14th runners-up result
- Minor premiers: Sydney; 10th minor premiership
- Brownlow Medallist: Patrick Cripps (Carlton); 45 votes
- Coleman Medallist: Jesse Hogan (Greater Western Sydney); 69 goals

Attendance
- Matches played: 216
- Total attendance: 8,285,635 (38,359 per match)
- Highest (H&A): 93,644 (round 7, Essendon v Collingwood)
- Highest (finals): 100,013 (grand final, Sydney v Brisbane Lions)

The 2024 AFL season was the 128th season of the Australian Football League (AFL), the highest-level senior men's Australian rules football competition in Australia. The season featured 18 clubs and ran from 7 March to 28 September, comprising a 23-match home-and-away season over 25 rounds, followed by a four-week finals series featuring the top eight clubs.

The Brisbane Lions won the premiership, defeating Sydney by 60 points in the 2024 AFL Grand Final; it was the Lions' fourth AFL premiership. Sydney won the minor premiership by finishing atop the home-and-away ladder with a 17–6 win–loss record. Carlton's Patrick Cripps won his second Brownlow Medal as the league's best and fairest player, breaking the record for most votes polled using the 3–2–1 voting system with 45, and Greater Western Sydney's Jesse Hogan won the Coleman Medal as the league's leading goalkicker.

== Background ==
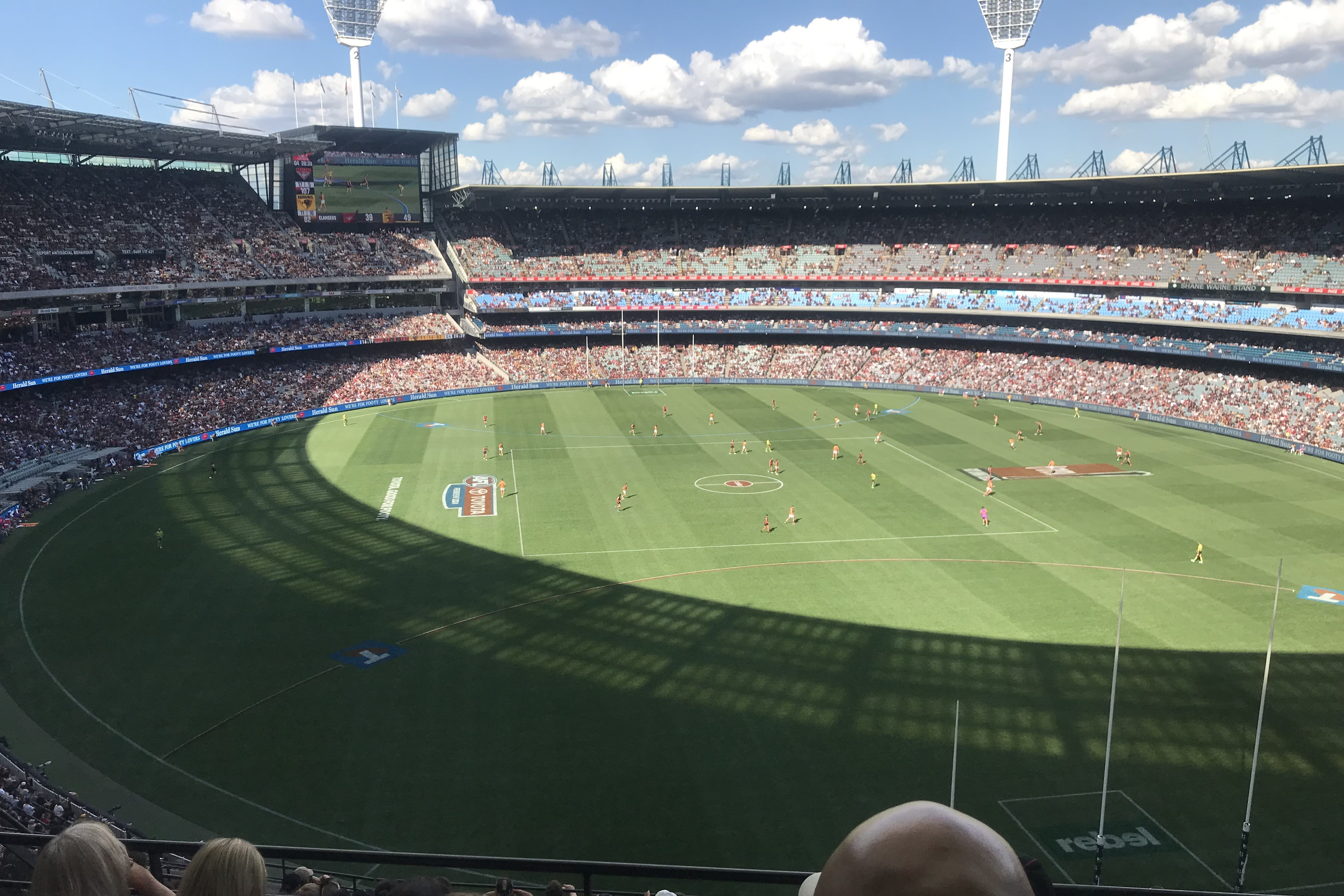
Essendon and Hawthorn players contest the football in round 1

In November 2023, the AFL and Seven Network announced that the usual start times for Thursday and Friday night matches would be brought forward by ten minutes to 7:30pm and 7:40pm (Melbourne time), respectively, for the upcoming season, in response to feedback from fans.

== Coach appointments ==
New coach	Club	Date of appointment	Previous coach	Ref.
Damien Hardwick	Gold Coast	21 August 2023	Stuart Dew	
Adem Yze	Richmond	21 September 2023	Damien Hardwick	

== Club leadership ==
Caretaker coaches are italicised.

Club	Coach	Leadership group		
Club	Coach	Captain(s)	Vice-captain(s)	Other leader(s)
Adelaide	Matthew Nicks	Jordan Dawson	Ben Keays, Reilly O'Brien, Brodie Smith	Darcy Fogarty, Mitch Hinge, Wayne Milera, Lachlan Murphy
Brisbane Lions	Chris Fagan	Harris Andrews, Lachie Neale	Josh Dunkley, Hugh McCluggage	Jarrod Berry, Charlie Cameron, Oscar McInerney, Cameron Rayner, Brandon Starcevich
Carlton	Michael Voss	Patrick Cripps	Charlie Curnow, Sam Walsh, Jacob Weitering	
Collingwood	Craig McRae	Darcy Moore	Jeremy Howe, Brayden Maynard, Isaac Quaynor	
Essendon	Brad Scott	Zach Merrett	Andrew McGrath	
Fremantle	Justin Longmuir	Alex Pearce	Andrew Brayshaw, Caleb Serong	Jaeger O'Meara, Sam Switkowski, Hayden Young
Geelong	Chris Scott	Patrick Dangerfield	Tom Stewart	
Gold Coast	Damien Hardwick	Touk Miller, Jarrod Witts	Noah Anderson, Sam Collins	
Greater Western Sydney	Adam Kingsley	Toby Greene	Stephen Coniglio, Josh Kelly	Tom Green, Connor Idun, Harry Perryman, Sam Taylor
Hawthorn	Sam Mitchell	James Sicily	Luke Breust, Dylan Moore	
Melbourne	Simon Goodwin	Max Gawn	Jack Viney	
North Melbourne	Alastair Clarkson	Luke McDonald, Jy Simpkin	Nick Larkey	Aidan Corr, Bailey Scott, Harry Sheezel
Port Adelaide	Ken Hinkley	Connor Rozee	Zak Butters	Willem Drew, Dan Houston, Sam Powell-Pepper
Richmond	Adem Yze	Toby Nankervis	Liam Baker, Tom Lynch, Jayden Short	
St Kilda	Ross Lyon	Jack Steele	Callum Wilkie	Rowan Marshall, Seb Ross, Jack Sinclair
Sydney	John Longmire	Callum Mills		
West Coast	Adam Simpson (r. 1–17); Jarrad Schofield (r. 18–24)	Oscar Allen, Liam Duggan	Tom Barrass	
Western Bulldogs	Luke Beveridge	Marcus Bontempelli	Tom Liberatore (vc), Caleb Daniel (dvc), Aaron Naughton (dvc)	Taylor Duryea, Liam Jones, Ed Richards

== Pre-season ==
All starting times are local time. Source: afl.com.au

	Official practice matches
Tuesday, 27 February (6:40 pm)	Collingwood 10.16 (76)	def.	Richmond 5.16 (46)	Ikon Park	Report
Wednesday, 28 February (6:40 pm)	Carlton 10.3 (63)	def. by	Melbourne 15.11 (101)	Ikon Park	Report
Thursday, 29 February (4:10 pm)	Sydney 8.8 (56)	def. by	Brisbane Lions 12.9 (81)	Blacktown ISP Oval	Report
Thursday, 29 February (7:10 pm)	Greater Western Sydney 15.15 (105)	def.	Gold Coast 9.7 (61)	Manuka Oval	Report
Friday, 1 March (5:10 pm)	Geelong 11.17 (83)	def.	Essendon 10.11 (71)	GMHBA Stadium	Report
Friday, 1 March (7:30 pm)	Port Adelaide 13.14 (92)	def.	Fremantle 8.5 (53)	Alberton Oval	Report
Saturday, 2 March (2:40 pm)	Adelaide 17.15 (117)	def.	West Coast 7.8 (50)	Hisense Stadium	Report
Saturday, 2 March (2:40 pm)	Hawthorn 9.8 (62)	def. by	Western Bulldogs 17.17 (119)	University of Tasmania Stadium	Report
Sunday, 3 March (2:10 pm)	St Kilda 11.18 (84)	def.	North Melbourne 10.5 (65)	RSEA Park	Report

== Season events ==
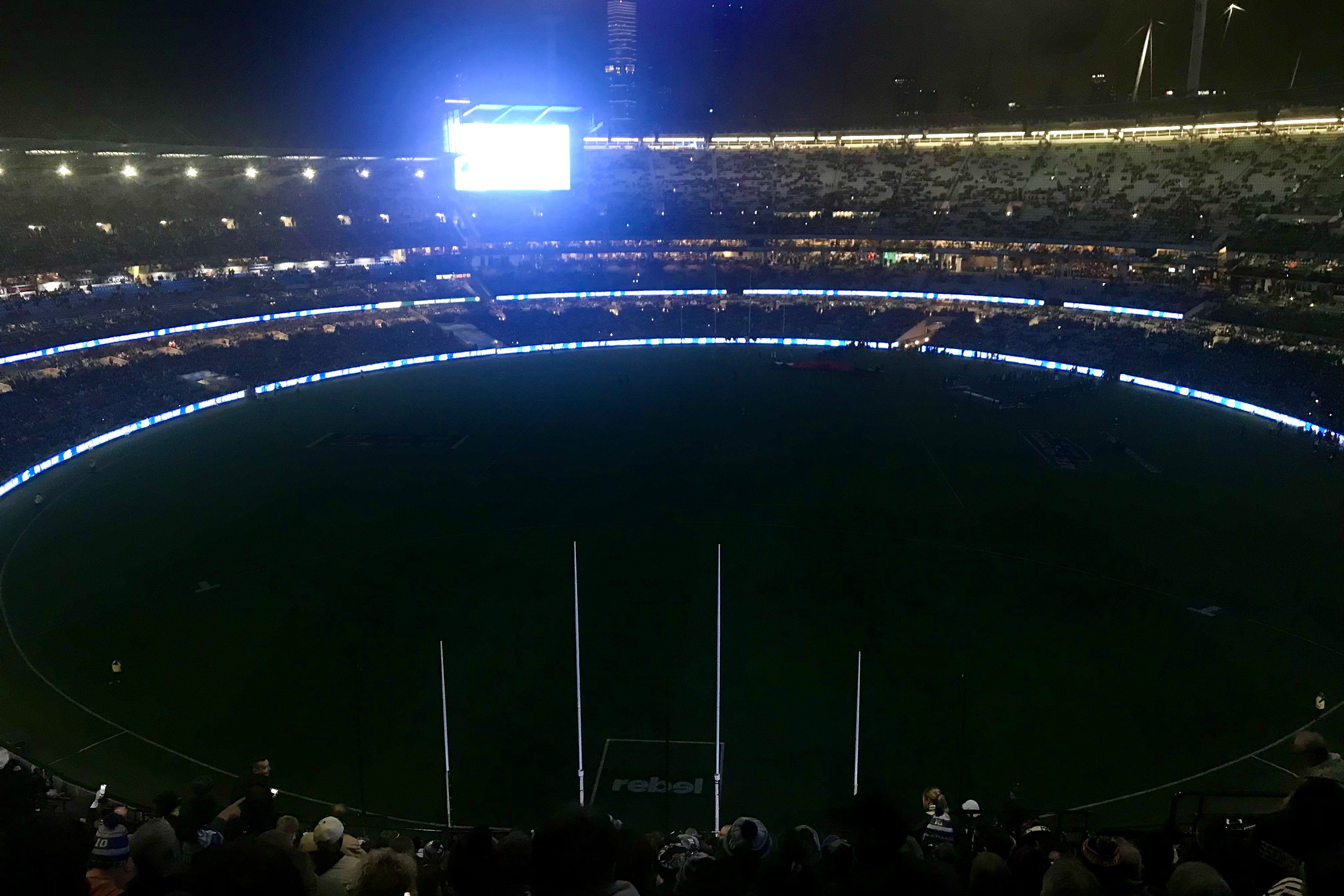
A view of the Melbourne Cricket Ground during the King's Birthday Eve pre-match ceremony

Andrew Dillon took over as CEO of the AFL from this season, commencing in October 2023. Dillon replaced Gillon McLachlan, who had served in the role since 2014.

On 20 February 2024, goal umpire Jesse Baird was scheduled to officiate a practice match between Sydney and Greater Western Sydney, but did not arrive at the match. One day later, New South Wales Police alleged Baird and his partner, Luke Davies, were murdered. Before the start of the Sydney and Melbourne match, both teams formed a minute silence in the middle of the field, along with the umpires, in honoring Jesse Baird.

In an effort to grow the game in the northern states, the season featured an "Opening Round" wherein two matches in Sydney, one in Brisbane and one on the Gold Coast were played, prior to round 1. Following its successful first iteration in 2023, Gather Round, a special round featuring all 18 clubs playing in the same region, was held for the second time in South Australia; it was held in round 4, from 4 to 7 April.

Following the season, several Greater Western Sydney players were sanctioned by the AFL for inappropriate costumes worn and skits performed at their Wacky Wednesday celebrations. Captain Toby Greene was among seven players fined $5,000 for lack of leadership, Josh Fahey was suspended for four matches, and five other players were each suspended for two matches.

== Home-and-away season ==
All starting times are local time. Source: afl.com.au

=== Opening Round ===
	Opening Round
Thursday, 7 March (7:30 pm)	Sydney 12.14 (86)	def.	Melbourne 9.10 (64)	Sydney Cricket Ground (crowd: 40,012)	Report; Stats
Friday, 8 March (6:40 pm)	Brisbane Lions 12.13 (85)	def. by	Carlton 13.8 (86)	The Gabba (crowd: 33,367)	Report; Stats
Saturday, 9 March (3:20 pm)	Gold Coast 14.15 (99)	def.	Richmond 9.6 (60)	People First Stadium (crowd: 22,086)	Report; Stats
Saturday, 9 March (7:30 pm)	Greater Western Sydney 18.6 (114)	def.	Collingwood 11.16 (82)	Engie Stadium (crowd: 21,235)	Report; Stats
	Bye: Adelaide; Essendon; Fremantle; Geelong; Hawthorn; North Melbourne; Port Adelaide; St Kilda; West Coast; Western Bulldogs
The Brisbane Lions' loss to Carlton ended its 14-match winning streak at the Gabba.; Gold Coast's half-time lead of 61 points over Richmond was the biggest in its history.

=== Round 1 ===
	Round 1
Thursday, 14 March (7:30 pm)	Carlton 12.14 (86)	def.	Richmond 12.9 (81)	Melbourne Cricket Ground (crowd: 83,881)	Report; Stats
Friday, 15 March (7:40 pm)	Collingwood 10.9 (69)	def. by	Sydney 15.12 (102)	Melbourne Cricket Ground (crowd: 78,933)	Report; Stats
Saturday, 16 March (1:45 pm)	Essendon 17.5 (107)	def.	Hawthorn 11.17 (83)	Melbourne Cricket Ground (crowd: 73,805)	Report; Stats
Saturday, 16 March (4:35 pm)	Greater Western Sydney 17.19 (121)	def.	North Melbourne 13.4 (82)	Engie Stadium (crowd: 8,034)	Report; Stats
Saturday, 16 March (7:30 pm)	Geelong 10.16 (76)	def.	St Kilda 9.14 (68)	GMHBA Stadium (crowd: 39,352)	Report; Stats
Saturday, 16 March (7:10 pm)	Gold Coast 8.12 (60)	def.	Adelaide 8.6 (54)	People First Stadium (crowd: 11,466)	Report; Stats
Sunday, 17 March (1:00 pm)	Melbourne 16.13 (109)	def.	Western Bulldogs 9.10 (64)	Melbourne Cricket Ground (crowd: 44,100)	Report; Stats
Sunday, 17 March (3:30 pm)	Port Adelaide 16.24 (120)	def.	West Coast 10.10 (70)	Adelaide Oval (crowd: 33,230)	Report; Stats
Sunday, 17 March (3:50 pm)	Fremantle 14.9 (93)	def.	Brisbane Lions 10.10 (70)	Optus Stadium (crowd: 40,604)	Report; Stats
The crowd of 78,933 for the Collingwood v Sydney match is the largest crowd for a home-and-away match involving South Melbourne/Sydney.; Owing to the completion of stadium redevelopments, the crowd of 39,352 for the Geelong v St Kilda match was the largest crowd for a VFL/AFL match at GMHBA Stadium since 1981.

=== Round 2 ===
	Round 2
Thursday, 21 March (7:30 pm)	St Kilda 14.10 (94)	def.	Collingwood 12.7 (79)	Melbourne Cricket Ground (crowd: 69,517)	Report; Stats
Friday, 22 March (7:10 pm)	Adelaide 11.11 (77)	def. by	Geelong 14.12 (96)	Adelaide Oval (crowd: 44,758)	Report; Stats
Saturday, 23 March (1:45 pm)	North Melbourne 11.10 (76)	def. by	Fremantle 15.12 (102)	Marvel Stadium (crowd: 17,589)	Report; Stats
Saturday, 23 March (4:35 pm)	Hawthorn 5.8 (38)	def. by	Melbourne 14.9 (93)	Melbourne Cricket Ground (crowd: 43,960)	Report; Stats
Saturday, 23 March (7:30 pm)	Sydney 19.17 (131)	def.	Essendon 15.11 (101)	Sydney Cricket Ground (crowd: 34,954)	Report; Stats
Sunday, 24 March (1:00 pm)	Western Bulldogs 18.7 (115)	def.	Gold Coast 10.7 (67)	Mars Stadium (crowd: 9,752)	Report; Stats
Sunday, 24 March (4:00 pm)	Richmond 13.14 (92)	def. by	Port Adelaide 18.14 (122)	Melbourne Cricket Ground (crowd: 30,254)	Report; Stats
Sunday, 24 March (3:50 pm)	West Coast 5.13 (43)	def. by	Greater Western Sydney 16.12 (108)	Optus Stadium (crowd: 42,401)	Report; Stats
	Bye: Brisbane Lions; Carlton

=== Round 3 ===
	Round 3
Thursday, 28 March (6:30 pm)	Brisbane Lions 10.12 (72)	def. by	Collingwood 14.8 (92)	The Gabba (crowd: 34,022)	Report; Stats
Friday, 29 March (4:20 pm)	North Melbourne 12.9 (81)	def. by	Carlton 21.11 (137)	Marvel Stadium (crowd: 47,565)	Report; Stats
Friday, 29 March (4:20 pm)	Fremantle 9.15 (69)	def.	Adelaide 4.10 (34)	Optus Stadium (crowd: 51,037)	Report; Stats
Saturday, 30 March (4:20 pm)	Essendon 10.11 (71)	def.	St Kilda 9.13 (67)	Marvel Stadium (crowd: 44,412)	Report; Stats
Saturday, 30 March (7:00 pm)	Port Adelaide 13.11 (89)	def. by	Melbourne 15.6 (96)	Adelaide Oval (crowd: 38,105)	Report; Stats
Sunday, 31 March (1:00 pm)	Western Bulldogs 16.10 (106)	def.	West Coast 3.12 (30)	Marvel Stadium (crowd: 22,291)	Report; Stats
Sunday, 31 March (4:00 pm)	Richmond 11.16 (82)	def.	Sydney 11.11 (77)	Melbourne Cricket Ground (crowd: 45,112)	Report; Stats
Monday, 1 April (3:20 pm)	Hawthorn 10.10 (70)	def. by	Geelong 17.4 (106)	Melbourne Cricket Ground (crowd: 67,020)	Report; Stats
	Bye: Gold Coast; Greater Western Sydney
Due to nearby lightning, the start of the fourth quarter of the Hawthorn v Geelong match was delayed by 40 minutes under the AFL's lightning protocols.

=== Round 4 ===
	Round 4 (Gather Round)
Thursday, 4 April (7:10 pm)	Adelaide 8.15 (63)	def. by	Melbourne 10.18 (78)	Adelaide Oval (crowd: 48,020)	Report; Stats
Friday, 5 April (4:40 pm)	Brisbane Lions 16.16 (112)	def.	North Melbourne 6.6 (42)	Norwood Oval (crowd: 9,037)	Report; Stats
Friday, 5 April (7:40 pm)	Port Adelaide 17.9 (111)	def.	Essendon 6.6 (42)	Adelaide Oval (crowd: 47,641)	Report; Stats
Saturday, 6 April (1:00 pm)	West Coast 11.12 (78)	def. by	Sydney 15.14 (104)	Summit Sport and Recreation Park (crowd: 9,225)	Report; Stats
Saturday, 6 April (3:50 pm)	Fremantle 9.9 (63)	def. by	Carlton 10.13 (73)	Adelaide Oval (crowd: 43,158)	Report; Stats
Saturday, 6 April (7:40 pm)	Western Bulldogs 14.7 (91)	def. by	Geelong 14.11 (95)	Adelaide Oval (crowd: 45,970)	Report; Stats
Sunday, 7 April (12:00 pm)	Gold Coast 13.11 (89)	def. by	Greater Western Sydney 18.9 (117)	Summit Sport and Recreation Park (crowd: 9,337)	Report; Stats
Sunday, 7 April (2:50 pm)	Richmond 9.6 (60)	def. by	St Kilda 9.13 (67)	Norwood Oval (crowd: 9,425)	Report; Stats
Sunday, 7 April (4:40 pm)	Collingwood 11.11 (77)	def.	Hawthorn 11.6 (72)	Adelaide Oval (crowd: 43,198)	Report; Stats

=== Round 5 ===
	Round 5
Thursday, 11 April (7:30 pm)	Melbourne 8.12 (60)	def. by	Brisbane Lions 12.10 (82)	Melbourne Cricket Ground (crowd: 43,098)	Report; Stats
Friday, 12 April (7:40 pm)	Western Bulldogs 9.13 (67)	def. by	Essendon 15.6 (96)	Marvel Stadium (crowd: 50,144)	Report; Stats
Saturday, 13 April (1:45 pm)	Greater Western Sydney 11.14 (80)	def.	St Kilda 12.7 (79)	Manuka Oval (crowd: 12,448)	Report; Stats
Saturday, 13 April (4:35 pm)	Carlton 14.14 (98)	def. by	Adelaide 16.4 (100)	Marvel Stadium (crowd: 46,283)	Report; Stats
Saturday, 13 April (7:30 pm)	Gold Coast 16.13 (109)	def.	Hawthorn 8.8 (56)	People First Stadium (crowd: 13,900)	Report; Stats
Saturday, 13 April (7:00 pm)	Port Adelaide 9.12 (66)	def.	Fremantle 9.9 (63)	Adelaide Oval (crowd: 35,658)	Report; Stats
Sunday, 14 April (1:00 pm)	Geelong 21.13 (139)	def.	North Melbourne 10.4 (64)	GMHBA Stadium (crowd: 31,194)	Report; Stats
Sunday, 14 April (2:00 pm)	West Coast 16.13 (109)	def.	Richmond 10.10 (70)	Optus Stadium (crowd: 47,665)	Report; Stats
	Bye: Collingwood; Sydney
The Brisbane Lions' win over Melbourne was their first home-and-away win at the Melbourne Cricket Ground since 2014.; The crowd of 50,144 for the Western Bulldogs v Essendon match was the largest crowd for an AFL match at Marvel Stadium since 2013 and the Bulldogs' largest home crowd for a home-and-away match since 2009.

=== Round 6 ===
	Round 6
Thursday, 18 April (7:30 pm)	St Kilda 9.10 (64)	def. by	Western Bulldogs 19.10 (124)	Marvel Stadium (crowd: 26,719)	Report; Stats
Friday, 19 April (7:10 pm)	Adelaide 11.9 (75)	def. by	Essendon 10.18 (78)	Adelaide Oval (crowd: 46,700)	Report; Stats
Saturday, 20 April (1:45 pm)	Collingwood 17.21 (123)	def.	Port Adelaide 12.9 (81)	Melbourne Cricket Ground (crowd: 65,834)	Report; Stats
Saturday, 20 April (4:35 pm)	Carlton 17.15 (117)	def.	Greater Western Sydney 15.8 (98)	Marvel Stadium (crowd: 40,474)	Report; Stats
Saturday, 20 April (7:30 pm)	Brisbane Lions 4.13 (37)	def. by	Geelong 9.9 (63)	The Gabba (crowd: 30,429)	Report; Stats
Saturday, 20 April (6:10 pm)	West Coast 16.9 (105)	def.	Fremantle 10.8 (68)	Optus Stadium (crowd: 54,473)	Report; Stats
Sunday, 21 April (1:05 pm)	Sydney 17.8 (110)	def.	Gold Coast 8.9 (57)	Sydney Cricket Ground (crowd: 35,649)	Report; Stats
Sunday, 21 April (4:05 pm)	North Melbourne 10.8 (68)	def. by	Hawthorn 17.11 (113)	Marvel Stadium (crowd: 30,648)	Report; Stats
	Bye: Melbourne; Richmond
The crowd of 65,834 for the Collingwood v Port Adelaide match is the largest crowd for a home-and-away match involving Port Adelaide.

=== Round 7 ===
	Round 7 (Anzac Appeal Round)
Wednesday, 24 April (7:25 pm)	Richmond 5.12 (42)	def. by	Melbourne 13.7 (85)	Melbourne Cricket Ground (crowd: 72,840)	Report; Stats
Thursday, 25 April (3:20 pm)	Essendon 12.13 (85)	drew with	Collingwood 12.13 (85)	Melbourne Cricket Ground (crowd: 93,644)	Report; Stats
Thursday, 25 April (7:35 pm)	Greater Western Sydney 17.11 (113)	def.	Brisbane Lions 8.11 (59)	Manuka Oval (crowd: 13,080)	Report; Stats
Friday, 26 April (7:10 pm)	Port Adelaide 11.16 (82)	def.	St Kilda 11.6 (72)	Adelaide Oval (crowd: 40,306)	Report; Stats
Saturday, 27 April (1:45 pm)	North Melbourne 12.9 (81)	def. by	Adelaide 20.18 (138)	Blundstone Arena (crowd: 5,365)	Report; Stats
Saturday, 27 April (4:35 pm)	Geelong 18.10 (118)	def.	Carlton 15.15 (105)	Melbourne Cricket Ground (crowd: 87,775)	Report; Stats
Saturday, 27 April (5:30 pm)	Fremantle 14.11 (95)	def.	Western Bulldogs 10.11 (71)	Optus Stadium (crowd: 45,931)	Report; Stats
Sunday, 28 April (1:00 pm)	Gold Coast 17.10 (112)	def.	West Coast 12.3 (75)	People First Stadium (crowd: 11,440)	Report; Stats
Sunday, 28 April (4:00 pm)	Hawthorn 5.12 (42)	def. by	Sydney 18.10 (118)	Melbourne Cricket Ground (crowd: 38,052)	Report; Stats
The crowd of 93,644 for the Essendon v Collingwood match is Essendon's largest home crowd for a home-and-away match.; Scott Pendlebury (Collingwood) recorded his 10,000th career disposal during the match against Essendon, becoming the first VFL/AFL player to do so.; The crowd of 87,775 for the Geelong v Carlton match is Geelong's largest home crowd for a home-and-away match.

=== Round 8 ===
	Round 8
Thursday, 2 May (7:00 pm)	Adelaide 12.6 (78)	def.	Port Adelaide 5.18 (48)	Adelaide Oval (crowd: 52,106)	Report; Stats
Friday, 3 May (7:40 pm)	Carlton 12.7 (79)	def. by	Collingwood 12.13 (85)	Melbourne Cricket Ground (crowd: 88,362)	Report; Stats
Saturday, 4 May (1:45 pm)	Sydney 14.14 (98)	def.	Greater Western Sydney 10.9 (69)	Sydney Cricket Ground (crowd: 40,337)	Report; Stats
Saturday, 4 May (4:35 pm)	St Kilda 15.13 (103)	def.	North Melbourne 10.5 (65)	Marvel Stadium (crowd: 27,009)	Report; Stats
Saturday, 4 May (7:30 pm)	Melbourne 10.14 (74)	def.	Geelong 9.12 (66)	Melbourne Cricket Ground (crowd: 51,795)	Report; Stats
Saturday, 4 May (6:10 pm)	West Coast 11.5 (71)	def. by	Essendon 11.11 (77)	Optus Stadium (crowd: 51,751)	Report; Stats
Sunday, 5 May (1:00 pm)	Richmond 6.13 (49)	def. by	Fremantle 15.13 (103)	Melbourne Cricket Ground (crowd: 32,252)	Report; Stats
Sunday, 5 May (4:00 pm)	Western Bulldogs 14.7 (91)	def. by	Hawthorn 14.14 (98)	Marvel Stadium (crowd: 29,555)	Report; Stats
Sunday, 5 May (7:10 pm)	Brisbane Lions 10.19 (79)	def.	Gold Coast 6.9 (45)	The Gabba (crowd: 30,285)	Report; Stats
The crowd of 88,362 for the Carlton v Collingwood match is the largest crowd for a home-and-away match between the two clubs.; Todd Goldstein (Essendon) recorded his 10,000th career hitout during the match against West Coast, becoming the first VFL/AFL player to do so.

=== Round 9 ===
	Round 9
Thursday, 9 May (7:30 pm)	Carlton 12.5 (77)	def.	Melbourne 11.10 (76)	Melbourne Cricket Ground (crowd: 58,472)	Report; Stats
Friday, 10 May (7:10 pm)	Geelong 14.11 (95)	def. by	Port Adelaide 15.11 (101)	GMHBA Stadium (crowd: 29,942)	Report; Stats
Friday, 10 May (6:20 pm)	Fremantle 4.15 (39)	def. by	Sydney 13.9 (87)	Optus Stadium (crowd: 46,198)	Report; Stats
Saturday, 11 May (1:45 pm)	Hawthorn 8.10 (58)	def.	St Kilda 7.11 (53)	University of Tasmania Stadium (crowd: 15,112)	Report; Stats
Saturday, 11 May (4:35 pm)	Essendon 12.10 (82)	def.	Greater Western Sydney 9.8 (62)	Marvel Stadium (crowd: 37,295)	Report; Stats
Saturday, 11 May (7:30 pm)	Richmond 6.6 (42)	def. by	Western Bulldogs 19.19 (133)	Melbourne Cricket Ground (crowd: 38,007)	Report; Stats
Saturday, 11 May (7:00 pm)	Gold Coast 17.18 (120)	def.	North Melbourne 7.10 (52)	TIO Stadium (crowd: 7,036)	Report; Stats
Sunday, 12 May (1:00 pm)	Collingwood 15.13 (103)	def.	West Coast 5.7 (37)	Marvel Stadium (crowd: 37,433)	Report; Stats
Sunday, 12 May (3:30 pm)	Adelaide 13.12 (90)	drew with	Brisbane Lions 13.12 (90)	Adelaide Oval (crowd: 40,278)	Report; Stats

=== Round 10 ===
	Round 10 (Sir Doug Nicholls Round week 1)
Thursday, 16 May (7:00 pm)	Gold Coast 26.8 (164)	def.	Geelong 15.10 (100)	TIO Stadium (crowd: 12,112)	Report; Stats
Friday, 17 May (7:40 pm)	Sydney 17.15 (117)	def.	Carlton 9.11 (65)	Sydney Cricket Ground (crowd: 44,047)	Report; Stats
Saturday, 18 May (1:45 pm)	Collingwood 12.6 (78)	def.	Adelaide 11.8 (74)	Melbourne Cricket Ground (crowd: 63,935)	Report; Stats
Saturday, 18 May (4:35 pm)	Greater Western Sydney 6.7 (43)	def. by	Western Bulldogs 8.22 (70)	Engie Stadium (crowd: 7,747)	Report; Stats
Saturday, 18 May (7:30 pm)	St Kilda 8.7 (55)	def. by	Fremantle 9.18 (72)	Marvel Stadium (crowd: 19,265)	Report; Stats
Saturday, 18 May (7:30 pm)	Brisbane Lions 26.7 (163)	def.	Richmond 6.8 (44)	The Gabba (crowd: 27,200)	Report; Stats
Sunday, 19 May (1:10 pm)	Essendon 16.10 (106)	def.	North Melbourne 10.6 (66)	Marvel Stadium (crowd: 43,125)	Report; Stats
Sunday, 19 May (2:50 pm)	Port Adelaide 11.14 (80)	def.	Hawthorn 12.7 (79)	Adelaide Oval (crowd: 36,190)	Report; Stats
Sunday, 19 May (4:20 pm)	West Coast 16.9 (105)	def.	Melbourne 10.10 (70)	Optus Stadium (crowd: 43,408)	Report; Stats
Six clubs rebranded themselves with Indigenous names across the two weeks of Sir Doug Nicholls Round: Adelaide (Kuwarna), Fremantle (Walyalup), Melbourne (Narrm), Port Adelaide (Yartapuulti), St Kilda (Euro-Yroke) and West Coast (Waalitj Marawar).; Gold Coast's score of 26.8 (164) against Geelong was its highest, the highest score at TIO Stadium and the highest score conceded by Geelong since 1994.; Gold Coast's 64-point win was its biggest over Geelong.; Gold Coast's score of 19.7 (121) at three-quarter time was its highest three-quarter time score.; The margin of 119 points in the Brisbane Lions v Richmond match was the Lions' biggest win over Richmond and Richmond's biggest loss since 2007.; The Brisbane Lions' score of 26.7 (163) against Richmond was its highest against Richmond.; Port Adelaide trailed by 41 points in the third quarter of its match against Hawthorn and went on to win, equalling its biggest comeback.

=== Round 11 ===
	Round 11 (Sir Doug Nicholls Round week 2)
Thursday, 23 May (7:30 pm)	Western Bulldogs 12.16 (88)	def. by	Sydney 16.6 (102)	Marvel Stadium (crowd: 27,377)	Report; Stats
Friday, 24 May (6:10 pm)	Fremantle 11.9 (75)	drew with	Collingwood 10.15 (75)	Optus Stadium (crowd: 54,035)	Report; Stats
Saturday, 25 May (1:45 pm)	North Melbourne 7.6 (48)	def. by	Port Adelaide 16.11 (107)	Blundstone Arena (crowd: 4,705)	Report; Stats
Saturday, 25 May (1:45 pm)	Carlton 15.12 (102)	def.	Gold Coast 11.7 (73)	Marvel Stadium (crowd: 39,597)	Report; Stats
Saturday, 25 May (4:35 pm)	Geelong 11.8 (74)	def. by	Greater Western Sydney 11.12 (78)	GMHBA Stadium (crowd: 30,821)	Report; Stats
Saturday, 25 May (7:40 pm)	Richmond 10.14 (74)	def. by	Essendon 12.14 (86)	Melbourne Cricket Ground (crowd: 79,359)	Report; Stats
Sunday, 26 May (1:10 pm)	Hawthorn 15.10 (100)	def.	Brisbane Lions 10.15 (75)	Marvel Stadium (crowd: 29,664)	Report; Stats
Sunday, 26 May (3:20 pm)	Melbourne 14.16 (100)	def.	St Kilda 9.8 (62)	Melbourne Cricket Ground (crowd: 37,403)	Report; Stats
Sunday, 26 May (4:10 pm)	Adelaide 21.11 (137)	def.	West Coast 5.8 (38)	Adelaide Oval (crowd: 40,965)	Report; Stats
Six clubs rebranded themselves with Indigenous names across the two weeks of Sir Doug Nicholls Round: Adelaide (Kuwarna), Fremantle (Walyalup), Melbourne (Narrm), Port Adelaide (Yartapuulti), St Kilda (Euro-Yroke) and West Coast (Waalitj Marawar).; Tom Hawkins (Geelong) played his 356th AFL match in Geelong's loss to Greater Western Sydney, breaking Geelong's VFL/AFL games record previously held by Joel Selwood.

=== Round 12 ===
	Round 12
Thursday, 30 May (7:30 pm)	Port Adelaide 10.11 (71)	def. by	Carlton 16.11 (107)	Adelaide Oval (crowd: 40,532)	Report; Stats
Friday, 31 May (7:40 pm)	Collingwood 12.10 (82)	def. by	Western Bulldogs 15.10 (100)	Marvel Stadium (crowd: 43,298)	Report; Stats
Saturday, 1 June (1:45 pm)	Hawthorn 16.11 (107)	def.	Adelaide 12.8 (80)	Melbourne Cricket Ground (crowd: 36,086)	Report; Stats
Saturday, 1 June (4:35 pm)	West Coast 10.8 (68)	def. by	St Kilda 12.10 (82)	Optus Stadium (crowd: 47,526)	Report; Stats
Saturday, 1 June (7:30 pm)	Geelong 15.9 (99)	def.	Richmond 10.9 (69)	GMHBA Stadium (crowd: 31,714)	Report; Stats
Sunday, 2 June (1:00 pm)	Melbourne 7.7 (49)	def. by	Fremantle 22.9 (141)	TIO Traeger Park (crowd: 6,109)	Report; Stats
Sunday, 2 June (4:00 pm)	Gold Coast 14.7 (91)	def.	Essendon 11.14 (80)	People First Stadium (crowd: 21,759)	Report; Stats
	Bye: Brisbane Lions; Greater Western Sydney; North Melbourne; Sydney

=== Round 13 ===
	Round 13
Thursday, 6 June (7:00 pm)	Adelaide 10.11 (71)	def. by	Richmond 12.7 (79)	Adelaide Oval (crowd: 37,342)	Report; Stats
Friday, 7 June (7:40 pm)	Western Bulldogs 10.11 (71)	def. by	Brisbane Lions 17.12 (114)	Marvel Stadium (crowd: 31,042)	Report; Stats
Saturday, 8 June (1:45 pm)	Hawthorn 12.13 (85)	def.	Greater Western Sydney 12.7 (79)	University of Tasmania Stadium (crowd: 11,568)	Report; Stats
Saturday, 8 June (2:35 pm)	West Coast 8.17 (65)	def. by	North Melbourne 11.8 (74)	Optus Stadium (crowd: 43,276)	Report; Stats
Saturday, 8 June (7:30 pm)	St Kilda 7.9 (51)	def.	Gold Coast 7.6 (48)	Marvel Stadium (crowd: 17,992)	Report; Stats
Sunday, 9 June (3:20 pm)	Sydney 16.16 (112)	def.	Geelong 12.10 (82)	Sydney Cricket Ground (crowd: 44,714)	Report; Stats
Sunday, 9 June (7:20 pm)	Essendon 9.16 (70)	def. by	Carlton 15.6 (96)	Melbourne Cricket Ground (crowd: 88,510)	Report; Stats
Monday, 10 June (3:20 pm)	Collingwood 14.5 (89)	def.	Melbourne 6.15 (51)	Melbourne Cricket Ground (crowd: 84,659)	Report; Stats
	Bye: Fremantle; Port Adelaide
North Melbourne's win over West Coast ended an eleven-match losing streak to start the season.

=== Round 14 ===
	Round 14
Friday, 14 June (7:40 pm)	Brisbane Lions 19.12 (126)	def.	St Kilda 16.10 (106)	The Gabba (crowd: 27,445)	Report; Stats
Saturday, 15 June (1:45 pm)	Western Bulldogs 23.11 (149)	def.	Fremantle 12.10 (82)	Marvel Stadium (crowd: 21,796)	Report; Stats
Saturday, 15 June (4:35 pm)	Richmond 6.13 (49)	def. by	Hawthorn 14.13 (97)	Melbourne Cricket Ground (crowd: 92,311)	Report; Stats
Saturday, 15 June (7:00 pm)	Adelaide 10.7 (67)	def. by	Sydney 16.13 (109)	Adelaide Oval (crowd: 41,535)	Report; Stats
Sunday, 16 June (1:00 pm)	North Melbourne 19.4 (118)	def. by	Collingwood 18.11 (119)	Marvel Stadium (crowd: 38,311)	Report; Stats
Sunday, 16 June (4:00 pm)	Greater Western Sydney 9.19 (73)	def.	Port Adelaide 6.15 (51)	Engie Stadium (crowd: 8,914)	Report; Stats
	Bye: Carlton; Essendon; Geelong; Gold Coast; Melbourne; West Coast
The crowd of 92,311 for the Richmond v Hawthorn match is the largest crowd for a match between the two clubs and Richmond's largest home crowd for a home-and-away match since 1977.; North Melbourne's first half score of 14.2 (86) against Collingwood, which was already its highest score of the season to that point, was its highest first half score since 2004.; Collingwood trailed by 54 points in the third quarter of its match against North Melbourne and went on to win, recording its biggest comeback since 1970.

=== Round 15 ===
	Round 15
Friday, 21 June (7:40 pm)	Carlton 21.12 (138)	def.	Geelong 11.9 (75)	Melbourne Cricket Ground (crowd: 75,218)	Report; Stats
Saturday, 22 June (1:15 pm)	Port Adelaide 10.13 (73)	def. by	Brisbane Lions 23.14 (152)	Adelaide Oval (crowd: 32,862)	Report; Stats
Saturday, 22 June (4:35 pm)	Greater Western Sydney 11.9 (75)	def. by	Sydney 15.12 (102)	Engie Stadium (crowd: 19,751)	Report; Stats
Saturday, 22 June (7:30 pm)	Melbourne 11.4 (70)	def.	North Melbourne 10.7 (67)	Melbourne Cricket Ground (crowd: 28,774)	Report; Stats
Sunday, 23 June (1:00 pm)	Essendon 19.8 (122)	def.	West Coast 13.14 (92)	Marvel Stadium (crowd: 40,840)	Report; Stats
Sunday, 23 June (2:00 pm)	Fremantle 12.13 (85)	def.	Gold Coast 10.5 (65)	Optus Stadium (crowd: 40,637)	Report; Stats
	Bye: Adelaide; Collingwood; Hawthorn; Richmond; St Kilda; Western Bulldogs

=== Round 16 ===
	Round 16
Friday, 28 June (7:40 pm)	Brisbane Lions 11.20 (86)	def.	Melbourne 11.15 (81)	The Gabba (crowd: 29,617)	Report; Stats
Saturday, 29 June (1:45 pm)	North Melbourne 9.6 (60)	def. by	Western Bulldogs 11.11 (77)	Marvel Stadium (crowd: 27,005)	Report; Stats
Saturday, 29 June (1:45 pm)	Sydney 14.14 (98)	def. by	Fremantle 15.9 (99)	Sydney Cricket Ground (crowd: 35,477)	Report; Stats
Saturday, 29 June (4:35 pm)	Gold Coast 14.17 (101)	def.	Collingwood 13.12 (90)	People First Stadium (crowd: 23,029)	Report; Stats
Saturday, 29 June (7:00 pm)	Adelaide 13.16 (94)	def.	Greater Western Sydney 12.6 (78)	Adelaide Oval (crowd: 29,802)	Report; Stats
Saturday, 29 June (7:30 pm)	Geelong 16.9 (105)	def.	Essendon 9.6 (60)	Melbourne Cricket Ground (crowd: 54,698)	Report; Stats
Sunday, 30 June (1:10 pm)	St Kilda 8.12 (60)	def. by	Port Adelaide 8.14 (62)	Marvel Stadium (crowd: 18,052)	Report; Stats
Sunday, 30 June (3:20 pm)	Richmond 10.10 (70)	def. by	Carlton 20.11 (131)	Melbourne Cricket Ground (crowd: 58,298)	Report; Stats
Sunday, 30 June (2:40 pm)	West Coast 4.9 (33)	def. by	Hawthorn 14.10 (94)	Optus Stadium (crowd: 49,454)	Report; Stats
Logan McDonald (Sydney) had a shot at goal after the final siren to win the match against Fremantle, but the ball fell short, failing to score.; Sydney's loss to Fremantle ended a ten-match winning streak.

=== Round 17 ===
	Round 17
Friday, 5 July (7:40 pm)	Collingwood 12.8 (80)	def. by	Essendon 13.14 (92)	Melbourne Cricket Ground (crowd: 81,711)	Report; Stats
Saturday, 6 July (1:45 pm)	North Melbourne 13.9 (87)	def.	Gold Coast 12.11 (83)	Marvel Stadium (crowd: 17,781)	Report; Stats
Saturday, 6 July (1:15 pm)	Port Adelaide 15.12 (102)	def.	Western Bulldogs 8.6 (54)	Adelaide Oval (crowd: 31,590)	Report; Stats
Saturday, 6 July (4:35 pm)	Geelong 16.14 (110)	def.	Hawthorn 9.5 (59)	GMHBA Stadium (crowd: 33,188)	Report; Stats
Saturday, 6 July (7:30 pm)	Greater Western Sydney 18.8 (116)	def.	Carlton 16.8 (104)	Engie Stadium (crowd: 11,730)	Report; Stats
Saturday, 6 July (6:10 pm)	Fremantle 16.9 (105)	def.	Richmond 7.12 (54)	Optus Stadium (crowd: 42,690)	Report; Stats
Sunday, 7 July (1:10 pm)	Melbourne 17.10 (112)	def.	West Coast 8.10 (58)	Melbourne Cricket Ground (crowd: 32,000)	Report; Stats
Sunday, 7 July (3:20 pm)	St Kilda 13.6 (84)	def.	Sydney 11.16 (82)	Marvel Stadium (crowd: 30,267)	Report; Stats
Sunday, 7 July (4:10 pm)	Brisbane Lions 14.13 (97)	def.	Adelaide 13.8 (86)	The Gabba (crowd: 30,183)	Report; Stats
Greater Western Sydney trailed by 39 points in the first quarter of its match against Carlton and went on to win, recording its biggest comeback.

=== Round 18 ===
	Round 18
Friday, 12 July (7:40 pm)	Collingwood 10.11 (71)	def. by	Geelong 13.13 (91)	Melbourne Cricket Ground (crowd: 73,435)	Report; Stats
Saturday, 13 July (1:45 pm)	Hawthorn 13.9 (87)	def.	Fremantle 10.14 (74)	University of Tasmania Stadium (crowd: 11,146)	Report; Stats
Saturday, 13 July (1:45 pm)	Sydney 20.18 (138)	def.	North Melbourne 9.5 (59)	Sydney Cricket Ground (crowd: 34,663)	Report; Stats
Saturday, 13 July (4:35 pm)	Western Bulldogs 14.16 (100)	def.	Carlton 12.14 (86)	Marvel Stadium (crowd: 45,387)	Report; Stats
Saturday, 13 July (7:00 pm)	Adelaide 10.11 (71)	def.	St Kilda 5.9 (39)	Adelaide Oval (crowd: 34,549)	Report; Stats
Saturday, 13 July (7:30 pm)	Melbourne 13.6 (84)	def.	Essendon 10.7 (67)	Melbourne Cricket Ground (crowd: 52,866)	Report; Stats
Sunday, 14 July (1:10 pm)	Gold Coast 14.12 (96)	def.	Port Adelaide 12.10 (82)	People First Stadium (crowd: 14,526)	Report; Stats
Sunday, 14 July (3:20 pm)	Richmond 12.12 (84)	def. by	Greater Western Sydney 17.6 (108)	Melbourne Cricket Ground (crowd: 19,040)	Report; Stats
Sunday, 14 July (2:40 pm)	West Coast 14.9 (93)	def. by	Brisbane Lions 16.10 (106)	Optus Stadium (crowd: 41,489)	Report; Stats
Gold Coast's win was its first against Port Adelaide since 2011, ending a 14-match losing streak.; The crowd of 19,040 for the Richmond v Greater Western Sydney match was Richmond's lowest home crowd for a home-and-away match since 2013, and its lowest for a home-and-away match at the Melbourne Cricket Ground since 2004.

=== Round 19 ===
	Round 19
Friday, 19 July (7:40 pm)	Essendon 17.11 (113)	def. by	Adelaide 17.13 (115)	Marvel Stadium (crowd: 36,020)	Report; Stats
Saturday, 20 July (1:45 pm)	Greater Western Sydney 14.5 (89)	def.	Gold Coast 6.14 (50)	Engie Stadium (crowd: 8,013)	Report; Stats
Saturday, 20 July (1:45 pm)	St Kilda 17.11 (113)	def.	West Coast 6.5 (41)	Marvel Stadium (crowd: 18,251)	Report; Stats
Saturday, 20 July (4:35 pm)	Hawthorn 20.13 (133)	def.	Collingwood 9.13 (67)	Melbourne Cricket Ground (crowd: 74,171)	Report; Stats
Saturday, 20 July (7:30 pm)	Geelong 7.6 (48)	def. by	Western Bulldogs 13.17 (95)	GMHBA Stadium (crowd: 27,967)	Report; Stats
Saturday, 20 July (7:00 pm)	Port Adelaide 16.20 (116)	def.	Richmond 11.9 (75)	Adelaide Oval (crowd: 27,704)	Report; Stats
Sunday, 21 July (1:10 pm)	Brisbane Lions 11.13 (79)	def.	Sydney 11.11 (77)	The Gabba (crowd: 33,924)	Report; Stats
Sunday, 21 July (1:20 pm)	Fremantle 17.14 (116)	def.	Melbourne 10.6 (66)	Optus Stadium (crowd: 42,215)	Report; Stats
Sunday, 21 July (4:40 pm)	Carlton 16.11 (107)	def.	North Melbourne 14.4 (88)	Marvel Stadium (crowd: 40,014)	Report; Stats

=== Round 20 ===
	Round 20
Friday, 26 July (7:40 pm)	Carlton 9.11 (65)	def. by	Port Adelaide 11.13 (79)	Marvel Stadium (crowd: 40,500)	Report; Stats
Saturday, 27 July (1:45 pm)	North Melbourne 10.6 (66)	def. by	Geelong 16.10 (106)	Blundstone Arena (crowd: 10,045)	Report; Stats
Saturday, 27 July (4:35 pm)	Gold Coast 9.11 (65)	def. by	Brisbane Lions 13.15 (93)	People First Stadium (crowd: 21,043)	Report; Stats
Saturday, 27 July (4:35 pm)	St Kilda 17.6 (108)	def.	Essendon 8.7 (55)	Marvel Stadium (crowd: 39,761)	Report; Stats
Saturday, 27 July (7:30 pm)	Melbourne 12.11 (83)	def. by	Greater Western Sydney 13.7 (85)	Melbourne Cricket Ground (crowd: 16,246)	Report; Stats
Saturday, 27 July (6:10 pm)	Fremantle 17.8 (110)	def.	West Coast 11.9 (75)	Optus Stadium (crowd: 56,536)	Report; Stats
Sunday, 28 July (1:10 pm)	Collingwood 14.9 (93)	def.	Richmond 9.13 (67)	Melbourne Cricket Ground (crowd: 58,342)	Report; Stats
Sunday, 28 July (3:20 pm)	Sydney 7.6 (48)	def. by	Western Bulldogs 12.15 (87)	Sydney Cricket Ground (crowd: 36,028)	Report; Stats
Sunday, 28 July (3:40 pm)	Adelaide 8.10 (58)	def. by	Hawthorn 19.10 (124)	Adelaide Oval (crowd: 41,823)	Report; Stats
The crowd of 21,043 for the Gold Coast v Brisbane match was Gold Coast's largest home crowd for a QClash at People First Stadium.; The crowd of 16,246 for the Melbourne v Greater Western Sydney match was Melbourne's lowest home crowd for a match at the Melbourne Cricket Ground since 2013.

=== Round 21 ===
	Round 21
Friday, 2 August (7:15 pm)	Western Bulldogs 15.20 (110)	def.	Melbourne 9.5 (59)	Marvel Stadium (crowd: 33,000)	Report; Stats
Friday, 2 August (6:30 pm)	West Coast 15.7 (97)	def.	Gold Coast 13.9 (87)	Optus Stadium (crowd: 38,671)	Report; Stats
Saturday, 3 August (1:45 pm)	North Melbourne 14.6 (90)	def.	Richmond 10.17 (77)	Marvel Stadium (crowd: 35,861)	Report; Stats
Saturday, 3 August (4:35 pm)	Geelong 13.12 (90)	def.	Adelaide 13.7 (85)	GMHBA Stadium (crowd: 28,939)	Report; Stats
Saturday, 3 August (7:30 pm)	Collingwood 12.12 (84)	def.	Carlton 11.15 (81)	Melbourne Cricket Ground (crowd: 86,879)	Report; Stats
Saturday, 3 August (7:00 pm)	Port Adelaide 22.16 (148)	def.	Sydney 5.6 (36)	Adelaide Oval (crowd: 37,501)	Report; Stats
Sunday, 4 August (1:10 pm)	Greater Western Sydney 12.12 (84)	def.	Hawthorn 12.10 (82)	Manuka Oval (crowd: 13,268)	Report; Stats
Sunday, 4 August (3:20 pm)	Essendon 13.12 (90)	def.	Fremantle 14.5 (89)	Melbourne Cricket Ground (crowd: 34,381)	Report; Stats
Sunday, 4 August (4:40 pm)	St Kilda 5.9 (39)	def. by	Brisbane Lions 19.10 (124)	Marvel Stadium (crowd: 23,053)	Report; Stats
The Western Bulldogs reverted to their former name, Footscray, for round 21 to celebrate the 70th anniversary of the club's first premiership.; Scott Pendlebury (Collingwood) became the sixth player in VFL/AFL history to play 400 games.; Mitch McGovern (Carlton) had a shot at goal after the final siren to win the match against Collingwood, but kicked the ball out of bounds, failing to score.; Sydney's 112-point loss to Port Adelaide was its biggest since 1993.; Callan Ward became the first player to play 250 games for Greater Western Sydney.; Greater Western Sydney trailed by 28 points at three-quarter time of its match against Hawthorn and went on to win, recording its biggest comeback from a three-quarter time deficit.; St Kilda's score of 5.9 (39) was its lowest against the Brisbane Lions.

=== Round 22 ===
	Round 22
Friday, 9 August (7:40 pm)	Sydney 13.11 (89)	def.	Collingwood 12.14 (86)	Sydney Cricket Ground (crowd: 37,854)	Report; Stats
Saturday, 10 August (1:45 pm)	Brisbane Lions 8.16 (64)	def. by	Greater Western Sydney 13.4 (82)	The Gabba (crowd: 31,364)	Report; Stats
Saturday, 10 August (1:45 pm)	North Melbourne 14.13 (97)	def. by	West Coast 15.12 (102)	Blundstone Arena (crowd: 6,619)	Report; Stats
Saturday, 10 August (2:35 pm)	Fremantle 9.8 (62)	def. by	Geelong 10.13 (73)	Optus Stadium (crowd: 50,600)	Report; Stats
Saturday, 10 August (7:30 pm)	Essendon 12.14 (86)	def. by	Gold Coast 13.9 (87)	Marvel Stadium (crowd: 29,401)	Report; Stats
Saturday, 10 August (7:30 pm)	Melbourne 7.9 (51)	def. by	Port Adelaide 7.11 (53)	Melbourne Cricket Ground (crowd: 17,867)	Report; Stats
Sunday, 11 August (1:10 pm)	Carlton 5.8 (38)	def. by	Hawthorn 16.16 (112)	Melbourne Cricket Ground (crowd: 84,773)	Report; Stats
Sunday, 11 August (3:20 pm)	Richmond 7.9 (51)	def. by	St Kilda 15.9 (99)	Marvel Stadium (crowd: 21,375)	Report; Stats
Sunday, 11 August (3:40 pm)	Adelaide 17.9 (111)	def.	Western Bulldogs 9.18 (72)	Adelaide Oval (crowd: 39,177)	Report; Stats
The crowd of 50,600 for the Fremantle v Geelong match is the largest crowd for a match between the two clubs.; Mac Andrew (Gold Coast) kicked a goal after the final siren to win the match against Essendon.; Gold Coast's win over Essendon ended a 17-match losing streak in away matches.; The crowd of 84,773 for the Carlton v Hawthorn match is the largest crowd for a home-and-away match between the two clubs.

=== Round 23 ===
	Round 23
Friday, 16 August (7:40 pm)	Essendon 8.11 (59)	def. by	Sydney 15.8 (98)	Marvel Stadium (crowd: 33,830)	Report; Stats
Saturday, 17 August (1:45 pm)	Gold Coast 9.9 (63)	def. by	Melbourne 18.9 (117)	People First Stadium (crowd: 13,026)	Report; Stats
Saturday, 17 August (1:45 pm)	Greater Western Sydney 15.11 (101)	def.	Fremantle 14.8 (92)	Engie Stadium (crowd: 10,801)	Report; Stats
Saturday, 17 August (4:35 pm)	Collingwood 11.13 (79)	def.	Brisbane Lions 11.12 (78)	Melbourne Cricket Ground (crowd: 61,218)	Report; Stats
Saturday, 17 August (7:00 pm)	Port Adelaide 11.14 (80)	def.	Adelaide 8.10 (58)	Adelaide Oval (crowd: 52,459)	Report; Stats
Saturday, 17 August (7:30 pm)	St Kilda 16.11 (107)	def.	Geelong 14.5 (89)	Marvel Stadium (crowd: 31,945)	Report; Stats
Sunday, 18 August (1:10 pm)	Western Bulldogs 20.18 (138)	def.	North Melbourne 6.6 (42)	Marvel Stadium (crowd: 33,182)	Report; Stats
Sunday, 18 August (3:20 pm)	Hawthorn 19.17 (131)	def.	Richmond 10.8 (68)	Melbourne Cricket Ground (crowd: 58,231)	Report; Stats
Sunday, 18 August (2:40 pm)	West Coast 4.10 (34)	def. by	Carlton 14.15 (99)	Optus Stadium (crowd: 48,455)	Report; Stats
The crowd of 48,455 for the West Coast v Carlton match is the largest crowd for a home-and-away match between the two clubs.

=== Round 24 ===
	Round 24
Friday, 23 August (7:40 pm)	Melbourne 8.9 (57)	def. by	Collingwood 15.13 (103)	Melbourne Cricket Ground (crowd: 53,957)	Report; Stats
Saturday, 24 August (12:30 pm)	Hawthorn 26.14 (170)	def.	North Melbourne 7.4 (46)	University of Tasmania Stadium (crowd: 11,392)	Report; Stats
Saturday, 24 August (1:45 pm)	Geelong 26.12 (168)	def.	West Coast 11.9 (75)	GMHBA Stadium (crowd: 32,545)	Report; Stats
Saturday, 24 August (3:20 pm)	Richmond 10.6 (66)	def. by	Gold Coast 14.10 (94)	Melbourne Cricket Ground (crowd: 34,557)	Report; Stats
Saturday, 24 August (7:30 pm)	Brisbane Lions 11.21 (87)	def.	Essendon 10.7 (67)	The Gabba (crowd: 31,663)	Report; Stats
Saturday, 24 August (7:40 pm)	Sydney 18.13 (121)	def.	Adelaide 13.12 (90)	Sydney Cricket Ground (crowd: 36,491)	Report; Stats
Sunday, 25 August (12:30 pm)	Western Bulldogs 14.14 (98)	def.	Greater Western Sydney 9.7 (61)	Mars Stadium (crowd: 10,224)	Report; Stats
Sunday, 25 August (3:20 pm)	Carlton 11.8 (74)	def. by	St Kilda 11.10 (76)	Marvel Stadium (crowd: 43,843)	Report; Stats
Sunday, 25 August (4:10 pm)	Fremantle 9.13 (67)	def. by	Port Adelaide 13.9 (87)	Optus Stadium (crowd: 45,322)	Report; Stats
The Hawthorn v North Melbourne match was moved forward from 4:40pm to 12:30pm due to industrial action from electrical workers in Launceston, eliminating the need for lighting at University of Tasmania Stadium; consequently, the Richmond v Gold Coast match was moved back from 2:10pm to 3:20pm to avoid having three matches played at the same time.; Due to nearby lightning, the Melbourne v Collingwood match was delayed by 36 minutes during the fourth quarter under the AFL's lightning protocols.; Hawthorn's 124-point win was its biggest over North Melbourne.; Geelong's first half score of 18.6 (114) against West Coast was its highest since 2011.

== Ladder ==
Pos	Team	Pld	W	L	D	PF	PA	PP	Pts	Qualification
1	Sydney	23	17	6	0	2242	1769	126.7	68	Finals series
2	Port Adelaide	23	16	7	0	2011	1752	114.8	64	Finals series
3	Geelong	23	15	8	0	2164	1928	112.2	60	Finals series
4	Greater Western Sydney	23	15	8	0	2034	1864	109.1	60	Finals series
5	Brisbane Lions (P)	23	14	8	1	2130	1747	121.9	58	Finals series
6	Western Bulldogs	23	14	9	0	2171	1736	125.1	56	Finals series
7	Hawthorn	23	14	9	0	2090	1763	118.5	56	Finals series
8	Carlton	23	13	10	0	2151	1952	110.2	52	Finals series
9	Collingwood	23	12	9	2	1991	1943	102.5	52	
10	Fremantle	23	12	10	1	1964	1755	111.9	50	
11	Essendon	23	11	11	1	1892	2024	93.5	46	
12	St Kilda	23	11	12	0	1748	1758	99.4	44	
13	Gold Coast	23	11	12	0	1925	1943	99.1	44	
14	Melbourne	23	11	12	0	1785	1812	98.5	44	
15	Adelaide	23	8	14	1	1906	1923	99.1	34	
16	West Coast	23	5	18	0	1594	2339	68.1	20	
17	North Melbourne	23	3	20	0	1619	2550	63.5	12	
18	Richmond	23	2	21	0	1505	2364	63.7	8	

Source: afl.com.au
Rules for classification: 1) points; 2) percentage; 3) number of points for
(P) Premiers

== Progression by round ==
4	Finished the round in first place	0	Finished the round in last place
4	Won the minor premiership	0	Finished the season in last place
4	Finished the round inside the top eight		
4_{1}	Subscript indicates the ladder position at the end of the round		
4_{1}	Underlined points indicate the team had a bye that round		

Team	O	1	2	3	4	5	6	7	8	9	10	11	12	13	14	15	16	17	18	19	20	21	22	23	24
Sydney	4_{3}	8_{2}	12_{2}	12_{5}	16_{3}	16_{4}	20_{2}	24_{2}	28_{1}	32_{1}	36_{1}	40_{1}	40_{1}	44_{1}	48_{1}	52_{1}	52_{1}	52_{1}	56_{1}	56_{1}	56_{1}	56_{1}	60_{1}	64_{1}	68_{1}
Port Adelaide	0	4_{5}	8_{3}	8_{8}	12_{6}	16_{3}	16_{5}	20_{5}	20_{7}	24_{6}	28_{4}	32_{3}	32_{4}	32_{4}	32_{7}	32_{8}	36_{7}	40_{6}	40_{9}	44_{7}	48_{7}	52_{3}	56_{2}	60_{2}	64_{2}
Geelong	0	4_{9}	8_{6}	12_{4}	16_{4}	20_{2}	24_{1}	28_{1}	28_{2}	28_{2}	28_{3}	28_{6}	32_{3}	32_{5}	32_{6}	32_{7}	36_{5}	40_{5}	44_{3}	44_{6}	48_{6}	52_{5}	56_{4}	56_{4}	60_{3}
Greater Western Sydney	4_{2}	8_{1}	12_{1}	12_{1}	16_{1}	20_{1}	20_{3}	24_{3}	24_{3}	24_{5}	24_{6}	28_{5}	28_{7}	28_{8}	32_{5}	32_{6}	32_{10}	36_{8}	40_{7}	44_{5}	48_{5}	52_{4}	56_{3}	60_{3}	60_{4}
Brisbane Lions	0_{5}	0_{12}	0_{12}	0_{14}	4_{13}	8_{10}	8_{12}	8_{13}	12_{13}	14_{13}	18_{12}	18_{13}	18_{13}	22_{13}	26_{13}	30_{10}	34_{8}	38_{7}	42_{4}	46_{3}	50_{2}	54_{2}	54_{5}	54_{5}	58_{5}
Western Bulldogs	0	0_{17}	4_{10}	8_{7}	8_{8}	8_{11}	12_{8}	12_{11}	12_{11}	16_{11}	20_{11}	20_{11}	24_{11}	24_{11}	28_{9}	28_{11}	32_{9}	32_{11}	36_{10}	40_{9}	44_{8}	48_{7}	48_{7}	52_{6}	56_{6}
Hawthorn	0	0_{13}	0_{17}	0_{17}	0_{16}	0_{17}	4_{17}	4_{17}	8_{16}	12_{15}	12_{15}	16_{14}	20_{12}	24_{12}	28_{12}	28_{13}	32_{13}	32_{13}	36_{13}	40_{11}	44_{9}	44_{10}	48_{8}	52_{7}	56_{7}
Carlton	4_{4}	8_{4}	8_{7}	12_{6}	16_{5}	16_{6}	20_{4}	20_{6}	20_{8}	24_{7}	24_{10}	28_{8}	32_{5}	36_{2}	36_{2}	40_{2}	44_{2}	44_{2}	44_{2}	48_{2}	48_{4}	48_{8}	48_{9}	52_{8}	52_{8}
Collingwood	0_{7}	0_{15}	0_{15}	4_{12}	8_{11}	8_{13}	12_{10}	14_{10}	18_{9}	22_{8}	26_{5}	28_{7}	28_{9}	32_{6}	36_{3}	36_{4}	36_{6}	36_{9}	36_{12}	36_{13}	40_{12}	44_{11}	44_{11}	48_{10}	52_{9}
Fremantle	0	4_{6}	8_{5}	12_{2}	12_{7}	12_{7}	12_{9}	16_{8}	20_{6}	20_{9}	24_{9}	26_{9}	30_{6}	30_{7}	30_{8}	34_{5}	38_{3}	42_{3}	42_{5}	46_{4}	50_{3}	50_{6}	50_{6}	50_{9}	50_{10}
Essendon	0	4_{7}	4_{11}	8_{9}	8_{12}	12_{9}	16_{7}	18_{7}	22_{5}	26_{3}	30_{2}	34_{2}	34_{2}	34_{3}	34_{4}	38_{3}	38_{4}	42_{4}	42_{6}	42_{8}	42_{10}	46_{9}	46_{10}	46_{11}	46_{11}
St Kilda	0	0_{11}	4_{9}	4_{11}	8_{9}	8_{12}	8_{13}	8_{14}	12_{14}	12_{14}	12_{14}	12_{15}	16_{15}	20_{14}	20_{14}	20_{14}	20_{15}	24_{14}	24_{15}	28_{15}	32_{14}	32_{14}	36_{14}	40_{13}	44_{12}
Gold Coast	4_{1}	8_{3}	8_{8}	8_{10}	8_{10}	12_{8}	12_{11}	16_{9}	16_{10}	20_{10}	24_{8}	24_{10}	28_{8}	28_{9}	28_{10}	28_{12}	32_{11}	32_{12}	36_{11}	36_{12}	36_{13}	36_{13}	40_{12}	40_{14}	44_{13}
Melbourne	0_{6}	4_{8}	8_{4}	12_{3}	16_{2}	16_{5}	16_{6}	20_{4}	24_{4}	24_{4}	24_{7}	28_{4}	28_{10}	28_{10}	28_{11}	32_{9}	32_{12}	36_{10}	40_{8}	40_{10}	40_{11}	40_{12}	40_{13}	44_{12}	44_{14}
Adelaide	0	0_{10}	0_{13}	0_{15}	0_{15}	4_{14}	4_{15}	8_{12}	12_{12}	14_{12}	14_{13}	18_{12}	18_{14}	18_{15}	18_{15}	18_{15}	22_{14}	22_{15}	26_{14}	30_{14}	30_{15}	30_{15}	34_{15}	34_{15}	34_{15}
West Coast	0	0_{18}	0_{18}	0_{18}	0_{18}	4_{16}	8_{14}	8_{15}	8_{15}	8_{16}	12_{16}	12_{16}	12_{16}	12_{16}	12_{16}	12_{16}	12_{16}	12_{16}	12_{16}	12_{16}	12_{16}	16_{16}	20_{16}	20_{16}	20_{16}
North Melbourne	0	0_{16}	0_{16}	0_{16}	0_{17}	0_{18}	0_{18}	0_{18}	0_{18}	0_{18}	0_{18}	0_{18}	0_{18}	4_{18}	4_{18}	4_{18}	4_{18}	8_{17}	8_{17}	8_{17}	8_{17}	12_{17}	12_{17}	12_{17}	12_{17}
Richmond	0_{8}	0_{14}	0_{14}	4_{13}	4_{14}	4_{15}	4_{16}	4_{16}	4_{17}	4_{17}	4_{17}	4_{17}	4_{17}	8_{17}	8_{17}	8_{17}	8_{17}	8_{18}	8_{18}	8_{18}	8_{18}	8_{18}	8_{18}	8_{18}	8_{18}

Source: AFL Tables

== Home matches and membership ==
The following table includes all home match attendance figures from the home-and-away season, excluding neutral matches (Gather Round).

Team	Home match attendance							Membership		
Team	Hosted	Total	Highest	Lowest	Average			2023	2024	Change
Team	Hosted	Total	Highest	Lowest	2023	2024	Change	2023	2024	Change
Adelaide	11	449,035	52,106	29,802	38,647	40,821	▲2,174	68,536	75,477	▲6,941
Brisbane Lions	11	339,499	34,002	27,200	29,285	30,864	▲1,579	54,676	63,268	▲8,592
Carlton	11	641,417	88,362	39,597	51,421	58,311	▲6,890	95,277	106,345	▲11,068
Collingwood	11	735,677	86,879	37,433	65,518	66,880	▲1,362	106,470	110,628	▲4,158
Essendon	11	555,263	93,644	29,401	46,690	50,478	▲3,788	86,274	83,664	▼2,610
Fremantle	11	515,805	56,536	40,604	44,097	46,891	▲2,794	62,064	62,237	▲173
Geelong	11	399,196	87,775	27,967	32,279	36,291	▲4,012	82,155	90,798	▲8,643
Gold Coast	11	171,423	23,029	7,036	13,724	15,584	▲1,860	23,359	26,157	▲2,798
Greater Western Sydney	11	135,021	21,235	7,747	10,261	12,275	▲2,014	33,036	36,629	▲3,593
Hawthorn	11	396,402	74,171	11,146	33,301	36,037	▲2,736	80,698	83,823	▲3,125
Melbourne	11	384,215	53,957	6,109	44,662	34,929	▼9,733	70,785	65,479	▼5,306
North Melbourne	11	241,494	47,565	4,705	20,765	21,954	▲1,189	51,084	50,628	▼456
Port Adelaide	11	406,137	52,459	27,704	37,336	36,922	▼414	64,041	66,015	▲1,974
Richmond	11	523,405	92,311	19,040	51,420	47,582	▼3,838	101,349	98,489	▼2,860
St Kilda	11	321,831	69,517	17,992	32,136	29,257	▼2,879	60,239	60,467	▲228
Sydney	11	420,226	44,714	34,663	32,833	38,202	▲5,369	65,332	73,757	▲8,425
West Coast	11	508,569	54,473	38,671	42,251	46,234	▲3,983	103,275	103,498	▲223
Western Bulldogs	11	313,750	50,144	9,752	28,499	28,523	▲24	56,302	62,328	▲6,026
Total/overall	198	7,487,304	93,644	4,705	36,396	37,815	▲1,419	1,264,952	1,319,687	▲54,735

Source: AFL Tables

== Finals series ==
Qualifying and elimination finals
7 September, Sydney Cricket Ground
1	Sydney	13.10 (88)
4	Greater Western Sydney	12.10 (82)
7 September, the Gabba
5	Brisbane Lions	14.15 (99)
8	Carlton	11.5 (71)
6 September, Melbourne Cricket Ground
6	Western Bulldogs	9.8 (62)
7	Hawthorn	14.15 (99)
5 September, Adelaide Oval
2	Port Adelaide	7.12 (54)
3	Geelong	20.18 (138)

Semi-finals
14 September, Engie Stadium
Greater Western Sydney	15.10 (100)
Brisbane Lions	15.15 (105)
13 September, Adelaide Oval
Port Adelaide	11.9 (75)
Hawthorn	11.6 (72)

Preliminary finals
20 September, Sydney Cricket Ground
Sydney	14.11 (95)
Port Adelaide	8.11 (59)
21 September, Melbourne Cricket Ground
Geelong	12.13 (85)
Brisbane Lions	14.11 (95)

Grand final
28 September, Melbourne Cricket Ground
Sydney	9.6 (60)
Brisbane Lions	18.12 (120)

All starting times are local time. Source: afl.com.au

=== Finals week 1 ===
Second qualifying final
Thursday, 5 September (7:10 pm)	Port Adelaide 7.12 (54)	def. by	Geelong 20.18 (138)	Adelaide Oval (crowd: 50,342)	Report; Stats
3.4 (22); 6.7 (43); 6.9 (45); 7.12 (54)	Q1; Q2; Q3; Q4	3.7 (25); 9.9 (63); 14.16 (100); 20.18 (138)
Burgoyne, Burton, Georgiades, Horne-Francis, McEntee, Rioli, Rozee	Goals	Cameron 4, Stengle 4, Mannagh 3, Miers 3, Bowes 2, Neale 2, Bruhn, O. Henry
Bergman, Wines, Horne-Francis, Burton	Best	Dangerfield, Holmes, Stengle, Cameron, Mannagh, Miers, Bowes

Second elimination final
Friday, 6 September (7:40 pm)	Western Bulldogs 9.8 (62)	def. by	Hawthorn 14.15 (99)	Melbourne Cricket Ground (crowd: 97,828)	Report; Stats
4.1 (25); 5.4 (34); 6.5 (41); 9.8 (62)	Q1; Q2; Q3; Q4	2.1 (13); 7.3 (45); 11.11 (77); 14.15 (99)
Naughton 3, Bontempelli, Darcy, English, Treloar, Vandermeer, Williams	Goals	Watson 4, Dear 3, Macdonald 2, Ginnivan, Gunston, Maginness, Meek, Newcombe
Liberatore, Richards, Treloar, Lobb, Williams	Best	Newcombe, Sicily, D'Ambrosio, Meek, Dear, Ward
The crowd of 97,828 for the Western Bulldogs v Hawthorn elimination final is the largest ever crowd for an elimination final and the largest crowd for a match between the two clubs since 1961.

First qualifying final
Saturday, 7 September (3:20 pm)	Sydney 13.10 (88)	def.	Greater Western Sydney 12.10 (82)	Sydney Cricket Ground (crowd: 43,189)	Report; Stats
1.4 (10); 4.5 (29); 7.6 (48); 13.10 (88)	Q1; Q2; Q3; Q4	2.5 (17); 7.8 (50); 10.9 (69); 12.10 (82)
Heeney 3, Hayward 2, Papley 2, Amartey, Campbell, Lloyd, McDonald, Rampe, Rowbottom	Goals	Cadman 3, Hogan 3, Ward 2, Jones, Keeffe, McMullin, Peatling
Heeney, Lloyd, Warner, Rowbottom, Papley, Cunningham	Best	Green, Peatling, Hogan, Ward, Whitfield, Cadman

First elimination final
Saturday, 7 September (7:30 pm)	Brisbane Lions 14.15 (99)	def.	Carlton 11.5 (71)	The Gabba (crowd: 35,660)	Report; Stats
5.5 (35); 9.7 (61); 10.12 (72); 14.15 (99)	Q1; Q2; Q3; Q4	0.0 (0); 2.1 (13); 5.2 (32); 11.5 (71)
Rayner 3, Ah Chee 2, Cameron 2, Daniher 2, Lohmann 2, Morris 2, Bailey	Goals	McKay 3, Pittonet 2, Acres, Cripps, Docherty, Fantasia, Hewett, E. Hollands
McCluggage, Zorko, Ashcroft, Neale, Starcevich, Wilmot	Best	Cripps, Hewett, Acres, Newman, De Koning, Weitering
Carlton's scoreless first quarter against the Brisbane Lions was the first by any team in a final since 1974.

=== Finals week 2 ===
Second semi-final
Friday, 13 September (7:10 pm)	Port Adelaide 11.9 (75)	def.	Hawthorn 11.6 (72)	Adelaide Oval (crowd: 51,012)	Report; Stats
2.3 (15); 5.6 (36); 7.8 (50); 11.9 (75)	Q1; Q2; Q3; Q4	0.2 (2); 4.3 (27); 7.3 (45); 11.6 (72)
Georgiades 3, Byrne-Jones 2, Rioli 2, Burgoyne, Horne-Francis, Marshall, Rozee	Goals	Watson 3, Ginnivan 2, Breust, Chol, Dear, Maginness, Moore, Sicily
Burgoyne, Rioli, Horne-Francis, Georgiades, Jones, L. Evans, Zerk-Thatcher, Sweet	Best	Scrimshaw, Newcombe, Watson, Worpel, Sicily, Morrison

First semi-final
Saturday, 14 September (7:30 pm)	Greater Western Sydney 15.10 (100)	def. by	Brisbane Lions 15.15 (105)	Engie Stadium (crowd: 18,357)	Report; Stats
5.3 (33); 8.7 (55); 14.8 (92); 15.10 (100)	Q1; Q2; Q3; Q4	3.5 (23); 4.10 (34); 9.13 (67); 15.15 (105)
Hogan 5, Greene 3, Peatling 2, Ash, Briggs, Cadman, Green, O'Halloran	Goals	Daniher 4, Cameron 2, Lohmann 2, Zorko 2, Ah Chee, Bailey, Fletcher, Hipwood, McInerney
Green, Hogan, Peatling, Kelly, Whitfield, Greene	Best	McCluggage, Daniher, Berry, Ashcroft, Zorko, Dunkley
The Brisbane Lions trailed by 44 points during the third quarter of the semi-final against Greater Western Sydney and went on to win, recording its biggest ever comeback in a final.

=== Finals week 3 ===
First preliminary final
Friday, 20 September (7:40 pm)	Sydney 14.11 (95)	def.	Port Adelaide 8.11 (59)	Sydney Cricket Ground (crowd: 44,053)	Report; Stats
4.0 (24); 9.1 (55); 13.7 (85); 14.11 (95)	Q1; Q2; Q3; Q4	2.3 (15); 4.6 (30); 6.9 (45); 8.11 (59)
Amartey 3, Papley 3, Heeney 2, McDonald 2, Warner 2, Lloyd, McLean	Goals	Rozee 2, Boak, Burgoyne, Burton, Dixon, Georgiades, Rioli
Heeney, Gulden, Blakey, Rowbottom, Warner, Florent	Best	Boak, Burgoyne, Rozee, Sweet, Butters
Ken Hinkley coached his 274th match for Port Adelaide in its loss to Sydney, breaking the record held by Mark Williams for most AFL matches coached for Port Adelaide.

Second preliminary final
Saturday, 21 September (5:15 pm)	Geelong 12.13 (85)	def. by	Brisbane Lions 14.11 (95)	Melbourne Cricket Ground (crowd: 93,066)	Report; Stats
1.5 (11); 8.7 (55); 10.8 (68); 12.13 (85)	Q1; Q2; Q3; Q4	3.2 (20); 5.6 (36); 10.10 (70); 14.11 (95)
O. Henry 4, J. Cameron 2, Miers 2, Blicavs, Dangerfield, Dempsey, Mannagh	Goals	Ah Chee 3, Bailey 2, C. Cameron 2, Morris 2, Rayner 2, Hipwood, Lohmann, McCluggage
Holmes, Dangerfield, Stewart, Miers, O. Henry	Best	Lohmann, Neale, McCluggage, Starcevich, Zorko, Bailey

=== Grand final ===
Grand final
Saturday, 28 September (2:30 pm)	Sydney 9.6 (60)	def. by	Brisbane Lions 18.12 (120)	Melbourne Cricket Ground (crowd: 100,013)	Report; Stats
3.1 (19); 4.3 (27); 5.4 (34); 9.6 (60)	Q1; Q2; Q3; Q4	4.3 (27); 11.7 (73); 16.11 (107); 18.12 (120)	Norm Smith Medal: Will Ashcroft; Field umpires: Craig Fleer, Nick Foot, Simon Meredith, Matt Stevic; National anthem: Cody Simpson
Parker 3, Fox, Hayward, Heeney, Papley, Rowbottom, Warner	Goals	Ah Chee 4, Lohmann 4, Daniher 2, Morris 2, Ashcroft, Berry, Cameron, Hipwood, McCluggage, Rayner
Rowbottom, Florent, Fox, Gulden, Parker	Best	Neale, Ashcroft, Lohmann, Ah Chee, Daniher, McCluggage

== Win–loss table ==
The following table can be sorted from biggest winning margin to biggest losing margin for each round. If multiple matches in a round are decided by the same margin, these margins are sorted by percentage (i.e. the lowest-scoring winning team is ranked highest and the lowest-scoring losing team is ranked lowest). Home matches are in bold, neutral matches (Gather Round) are underlined and opponents are listed above the margins.

+	Win		Qualified for finals
−	Loss		Eliminated
	Draw	X	Bye

Team	Home-and-away season																									Ladder	Finals series			
Team	O	1	2	3	4	5	6	7	8	9	10	11	12	13	14	15	16	17	18	19	20	21	22	23	24	Ladder	F1	F2	F3	GF
Adelaide	X	GC −6	**GEE** **−19**	FRE −35	MEL −15	CAR +2	**ESS** **−3**	NM +57	**PA** **+30**	**BL**; **0**	COL −4	**WC** **+99**	HAW −27	**RIC** **−8**	**SYD** **−42**	X	**GWS** **+16**	BL −11	**STK** **+32**	ESS +2	**HAW** **−66**	GEE −5	**WB** **+39**	PA −22	SYD −31	15 (8–14–1)				
Brisbane Lions	**CAR** **−1**	FRE −23	X	**COL** **−20**	NM +70	MEL +22	**GEE** **−26**	GWS −54	**GC** **+34**	ADE; 0	**RIC** **+119**	HAW −25	X	WB +43	**STK** **+20**	PA +79	**MEL** **+5**	**ADE** **+11**	WC +13	**SYD** **+2**	GC +28	STK +85	**GWS** **−18**	COL −1	**ESS** **+20**	5 (14–8–1)	**CAR** **+28**	GWS +5	GEE +10	SYD +60
Carlton	BL +1	**RIC** **+5**	X	NM +56	FRE +10	**ADE** **−2**	**GWS** **+19**	GEE −13	**COL** **−6**	**MEL** **+1**	SYD −52	**GC** **+29**	PA +36	ESS +26	X	**GEE** **+63**	RIC +61	GWS −12	WB −14	**NM** **+19**	**PA** **−14**	COL −3	**HAW** **−74**	WC +65	**STK** **−2**	8 (13–10–0)	BL −28			
Collingwood	GWS −32	**SYD** **−33**	STK −15	BL +20	HAW +5	X	**PA** **+42**	ESS; 0	CAR +6	**WC** **+66**	**ADE** **+4**	FRE; 0	**WB** **−18**	**MEL** **+38**	NM +1	X	GC −11	**ESS** **−12**	**GEE** **−20**	HAW −66	**RIC** **+26**	**CAR** **+3**	SYD −3	**BL** **+1**	MEL +46	9 (12–9–2)				
Essendon	X	**HAW** **+24**	SYD −30	**STK** **+4**	PA −69	WB +29	ADE +3	**COL**; **0**	WC +6	**GWS** **+20**	**NM** **+40**	RIC +12	GC −11	**CAR** **−26**	X	**WC** **+30**	GEE −45	COL +12	MEL −17	**ADE** **−2**	STK −53	**FRE** **+1**	**GC** **−1**	**SYD** **−39**	BL −20	11 (11–11–1)				
Fremantle	X	**BL** **+23**	NM +26	**ADE** **+35**	CAR −10	PA −3	WC −37	**WB** **+24**	RIC +54	**SYD** **−48**	STK +17	**COL**; **0**	MEL +92	X	WB −67	**GC** **+20**	SYD +1	**RIC** **+51**	HAW −13	**MEL** **+50**	**WC** **+35**	ESS −1	**GEE** **−11**	GWS −9	**PA** **−20**	10 (12–10–1)				
Geelong	X	**STK** **+8**	ADE +19	HAW +36	WB +4	**NM** **+75**	BL +26	**CAR** **+13**	MEL −8	**PA** **−6**	GC −64	**GWS** **−4**	**RIC** **+30**	SYD −30	X	CAR −63	**ESS** **+45**	**HAW** **+51**	COL +20	**WB** **−47**	NM +40	**ADE** **+5**	FRE +11	STK −18	**WC** **+93**	3 (15–8–0)	PA +84	X	**BL** **−10**	
Gold Coast	**RIC** **+39**	**ADE** **+6**	WB −48	X	GWS −28	**HAW** **+53**	SYD −53	**WC** **+37**	BL −34	**NM** **+68**	**GEE** **+64**	CAR −29	**ESS** **+11**	STK −3	X	FRE −20	**COL** **+11**	NM −4	**PA** **+14**	GWS −39	**BL** **−28**	WC −10	ESS +1	**MEL** **−54**	RIC +28	13 (11–12–0)				
Greater Western Sydney	**COL** **+32**	**NM** **+39**	WC +65	X	GC +28	**STK** **+1**	CAR −19	**BL** **+54**	SYD −29	ESS −20	**WB** **−27**	GEE +4	X	HAW −6	**PA** **+22**	**SYD** **−27**	ADE −16	**CAR** **+12**	RIC +24	**GC** **+39**	MEL +2	**HAW** **+2**	BL +18	**FRE** **+9**	WB −37	4 (15–8–0)	SYD −6	**BL** **−5**		
Hawthorn	X	ESS −24	**MEL** **−55**	**GEE** **−36**	COL −5	GC −53	NM +45	**SYD** **−76**	WB +7	**STK** **+5**	PA −1	**BL** **+25**	**ADE** **+27**	**GWS** **+6**	RIC +48	X	WC +61	GEE −51	**FRE** **+13**	**COL** **+66**	ADE +66	GWS −2	CAR +74	**RIC** **+63**	**NM** **+124**	7 (14–9–0)	WB +37	PA −3		
Melbourne	SYD −22	**WB** **+45**	HAW +55	PA +7	ADE +15	**BL** **−22**	X	RIC +43	**GEE** **+8**	CAR −1	WC −35	**STK** **+38**	**FRE** **−92**	COL −38	X	**NM** **+3**	BL −5	**WC** **+54**	**ESS** **+17**	FRE −50	**GWS** **−2**	WB −51	**PA** **−2**	GC +54	**COL** **−46**	14 (11–12–0)				
North Melbourne	X	GWS −39	**FRE** **−26**	**CAR** **−56**	BL −70	GEE −75	**HAW** **−45**	**ADE** **−57**	STK −38	GC −68	ESS −40	**PA** **−59**	X	WC +9	**COL** **−1**	MEL −3	**WB** **−17**	**GC** **+4**	SYD −79	CAR −19	**GEE** **−40**	**RIC** **+13**	**WC** **−5**	WB −96	HAW −124	17 (3–20–0)				
Port Adelaide	X	**WC** **+50**	RIC +30	**MEL** **−7**	ESS +69	**FRE** **+3**	COL −42	**STK** **+10**	ADE −30	GEE +6	**HAW** **+1**	NM +59	**CAR** **−36**	X	GWS −22	**BL** **−79**	STK +2	**WB** **+48**	GC −14	**RIC** **+41**	CAR +14	**SYD** **+112**	MEL +2	**ADE** **+22**	FRE +20	2 (16–7–0)	**GEE** **−84**	**HAW** **+3**	SYD −36	
Richmond	GC −39	CAR −5	**PA** **−30**	**SYD** **+5**	STK −7	WC −39	X	**MEL** **−43**	**FRE** **−54**	**WB** **−91**	BL −119	**ESS** **−12**	GEE −30	ADE +8	**HAW** **−48**	X	**CAR** **−61**	FRE −51	**GWS** **−24**	PA −41	COL −26	NM −13	**STK** **−48**	HAW −63	**GC** **−28**	18 (2–21–0)				
St Kilda	X	GEE −8	**COL** **+15**	ESS −4	RIC +7	GWS −1	**WB** **−60**	PA −10	**NM** **+38**	HAW −5	**FRE** **−17**	MEL −38	WC +14	**GC** **+3**	BL −20	X	**PA** **−2**	**SYD** **+2**	ADE −32	**WC** **+72**	**ESS** **+53**	**BL** **−85**	RIC +48	**GEE** **+18**	CAR +2	12 (11–12–0)				
Sydney	**MEL** **+22**	COL +33	**ESS** **+30**	RIC −5	WC +26	X	**GC** **+53**	HAW +76	**GWS** **+29**	FRE +48	**CAR** **+52**	WB +14	X	**GEE** **+30**	ADE +42	GWS +27	**FRE** **−1**	STK −2	**NM** **+79**	BL −2	**WB** **−39**	PA −112	**COL** **+3**	ESS +39	**ADE** **+31**	1 (17–6–0)	**GWS** **+6**	X	**PA** **+36**	**BL** **−60**
West Coast	X	PA −50	**GWS** **−65**	WB −76	SYD −26	**RIC** **+39**	**FRE** **+37**	GC −37	**ESS** **−6**	COL −66	**MEL** **+35**	ADE −99	**STK** **−14**	**NM** **−9**	X	ESS −30	**HAW** **−61**	MEL −54	**BL** **−13**	STK −72	FRE −35	**GC** **+10**	NM +5	**CAR** **−65**	GEE −93	16 (5–18–0)				
Western Bulldogs	X	MEL −45	**GC** **+48**	**WC** **+76**	GEE −4	**ESS** **−29**	STK +60	FRE −24	**HAW** **−7**	RIC +91	GWS +27	**SYD** **−14**	COL +18	**BL** **−43**	**FRE** **+67**	X	NM +17	PA −48	**CAR** **+14**	GEE +47	SYD +39	**MEL** **+51**	ADE −39	**NM** **+96**	**GWS** **+37**	6 (14–9–0)	**HAW** **−37**			

Source: AFL Tables

== Season notes ==
- In 2024, the AFL recorded the three highest-attended home-and-away rounds in VFL/AFL history, with cumulative attendances of 413,405 in round 1, 408,433 in round 7 and 403,452 in round 8, after only recording a cumulative attendance of over 400,000 once previously.
- For the first time in VFL/AFL history, both reigning grand finalists – Collingwood and the Brisbane Lions – lost their first two matches of the following season; both clubs eventually lost their first three matches.
- Sydney won 13 of its first 14 matches of the season, its best start to a season since 1918.
- Charlie Curnow (Carlton) kicked multiple goals in each of his club's first 15 matches of the season, the longest such streak since 2009.
- The AFL broke the record club membership tally by the end of July, a month before the cutoff date, eventually setting a new record of 1,319,687; 13 clubs achieved record tallies, with eight clubs recording increases of over 10% on their 2023 figures.
- Hawthorn qualified for finals after losing its first five matches of the season, its worst start to a season in which it qualified for finals; its four losses after round 5 were the fewest by any club for the remainder of the home-and-away season.
- The AFL recorded a cumulative attendance of 7,756,268 for the home-and-away season, breaking the VFL/AFL home-and-away attendance record set the previous season.

== Milestones ==
Round	Player/official	Club	Milestone
1	Josh Kelly	Greater Western Sydney	200th AFL game
2	Sebastian Ross	St Kilda	200th AFL game
2	Brandon Ellis	Gold Coast	250th AFL game
2	Ken Hinkley	Port Adelaide	250th AFL game coached
2	Travis Boak	Port Adelaide	350th AFL game
3	Tom Mitchell	Collingwood	200th AFL game
3	Brodie Smith	Adelaide	250th AFL game
3	Jack Viney	Melbourne	200th AFL game
3	Tom Hawkins	Geelong	350th AFL game
4	Mark Blicavs	Geelong	250th AFL game
5	Lachie Neale	Brisbane Lions	250th AFL game
5	Rhys Stanley	Geelong	200th AFL game
6	Chelsea Roffey	—	300th AFL game goal umpired
6	Brodie Grundy	Sydney	200th AFL game
7	Jeremy Cameron	Geelong	600th AFL goal
8	Elliot Yeo	West Coast	200th AFL game
9	Callan Ward	Greater Western Sydney	300th AFL game
10	Taylor Duryea	Western Bulldogs	200th AFL game
11	Jake Stringer	Essendon	200th AFL game
12	Jack Gunston	Hawthorn	250th AFL game
14	Dustin Martin	Richmond	300th AFL game
14	Brayden Maynard	Collingwood	200th AFL game
15	Harris Andrews	Brisbane Lions	200th AFL game
16	Dyson Heppell	Essendon	250th AFL game
17	Brad Scott	Essendon	250th AFL game coached
17	Gary Rohan	Geelong	200th AFL game
18	Patrick Cripps	Carlton	200th AFL game
19	Bradley Hill	St Kilda	250th AFL game
19	Harry Cunningham	Sydney	200th AFL game
21	Adam Treloar	Western Bulldogs	250th AFL game
21	Luke McDonald	North Melbourne	200th AFL game
21	Scott Pendlebury	Collingwood	400th AFL game
21	Ryan Lester	Brisbane Lions	200th AFL game
22	Jeremy Howe	Collingwood	250th AFL game
22	Jeremy Cameron	Geelong	250th AFL game
23	Jamie Cripps	West Coast	250th AFL game
24	Joe Daniher	Brisbane Lions	200th AFL game
24	Ollie Wines	Port Adelaide	250th AFL game
F1	Liam Jones	Western Bulldogs	200th AFL game
F2	Luke Breust	Hawthorn	300th AFL game
F2	Charlie Cameron	Brisbane Lions	400th AFL goal
F3	Isaac Heeney	Sydney	200th AFL game
F3	Dane Rampe	Sydney	250th AFL game

Source: AFL Tables (players); other milestones sourced individually

== Coach departures ==
Outgoing coach	Club	Manner of departure	Date of departure	Caretaker coach	Incoming coach	Date of appointment
Adam Simpson	West Coast	Mutually parted ways mid-season	9 July 2024	Jarrad Schofield	Andrew McQualter	30 September 2024
John Longmire	Sydney	Resigned	26 November 2024	—	Dean Cox	26 November 2024

== Awards ==
=== Major awards ===
- The Norm Smith Medal was awarded to the Brisbane Lions' Will Ashcroft.
- The Brownlow Medal was awarded to Carlton's Patrick Cripps, who broke the record for most votes polled using the 3–2–1 voting system with 45.
- The Leigh Matthews Trophy was awarded to the Western Bulldogs' Marcus Bontempelli.
- The Coleman Medal was awarded to Greater Western Sydney's Jesse Hogan.
- The Goal of the Year was awarded to West Coast's Harley Reid.
- The Mark of the Year was awarded to Collingwood's Bobby Hill.
- The AFL Rising Star was awarded to Geelong's Ollie Dempsey.

=== Leading goalkickers ===
1	Led the goalkicking at the end of the round
1	Led the goalkicking at the end of the home-and-away season
1_{1}	Subscript indicates the player's goal tally to that point of the season
–	Did not play during that round
X	Had a bye during that round

#	Player	Club	Home-and-away season (Coleman Medal)																									Finals series				Total	Games	Average
#	Player	Club	O	1	2	3	4	5	6	7	8	9	10	11	12	13	14	15	16	17	18	19	20	21	22	23	24	F1	F2	F3	GF	Total	Games	Average
1	Jesse Hogan	Greater Western Sydney	4_{4}	6_{10}	2_{12}	X_{12}	4_{16}	2_{18}	3_{21}	1_{22}	2_{24}	2_{26}	3_{29}	2_{31}	X_{31}	1_{32}	1_{33}	1_{34}	2_{36}	5_{41}	4_{45}	4_{49}	4_{53}	5_{58}	3_{61}	6_{67}	2_{69}	3_{72}	5_{77}			77	25	3.08
2	Jeremy Cameron	Geelong	X_{0}	2_{2}	2_{4}	2_{6}	2_{8}	6_{14}	0_{14}	5_{19}	0_{19}	1_{20}	–_{20}	1_{21}	1_{22}	2_{24}	X_{24}	3_{27}	2_{29}	4_{33}	3_{36}	1_{37}	2_{39}	6_{45}	1_{46}	3_{49}	9_{58}	4_{62}	X_{62}	2_{64}		64	24	2.67
3	Joe Daniher	Brisbane Lions	1_{1}	3_{4}	X_{4}	1_{5}	5_{10}	2_{12}	0_{12}	0_{12}	2_{14}	1_{15}	3_{18}	2_{20}	X_{20}	2_{22}	5_{27}	3_{30}	2_{32}	0_{32}	2_{34}	3_{37}	2_{39}	4_{43}	2_{45}	4_{49}	1_{50}	2_{52}	4_{56}	0_{56}	2_{58}	58	27	2.15
4	Charlie Curnow	Carlton	4_{4}	2_{6}	X_{6}	4_{10}	3_{13}	4_{17}	3_{20}	3_{23}	2_{25}	2_{27}	2_{29}	4_{33}	3_{36}	2_{38}	X_{38}	5_{43}	2_{45}	1_{46}	3_{49}	4_{53}	3_{56}	0_{56}	1_{57}	–_{57}	–_{57}	–_{57}				57	21	2.71
5	Ben King	Gold Coast	5_{5}	0_{5}	2_{7}	X_{7}	3_{10}	4_{14}	2_{16}	3_{19}	3_{22}	3_{25}	4_{29}	3_{32}	4_{36}	2_{38}	X_{38}	–_{38}	4_{42}	1_{43}	2_{45}	0_{45}	1_{46}	3_{49}	3_{52}	2_{54}	1_{55}					55	22	2.50
6	Jake Waterman	West Coast	X_{0}	2_{2}	1_{3}	1_{4}	2_{6}	6_{12}	5_{17}	4_{21}	3_{24}	–_{24}	5_{29}	1_{30}	–_{30}	3_{33}	X_{33}	3_{36}	1_{37}	2_{39}	2_{41}	–_{41}	3_{44}	4_{48}	1_{49}	2_{51}	2_{53}					53	20	2.65
7	Harry McKay	Carlton	3_{3}	3_{6}	X_{6}	5_{11}	0_{11}	2_{13}	3_{16}	2_{18}	4_{22}	1_{23}	1_{24}	1_{25}	3_{28}	1_{29}	X_{29}	3_{32}	2_{34}	5_{39}	3_{42}	2_{44}	–_{44}	1_{45}	1_{46}	–_{46}	–_{46}	3_{49}				49	21	2.33
8	Nick Larkey	North Melbourne	X_{0}	3_{3}	1_{4}	3_{7}	1_{8}	2_{10}	3_{13}	2_{15}	2_{17}	1_{18}	1_{19}	0_{19}	X_{19}	5_{24}	4_{28}	0_{28}	0_{28}	3_{31}	3_{34}	2_{36}	3_{39}	5_{44}	1_{45}	1_{46}	0_{46}					46	23	2.00
8	Tyson Stengle	Geelong	X_{0}	0_{0}	1_{1}	2_{3}	4_{7}	2_{9}	2_{11}	1_{12}	2_{14}	4_{18}	3_{21}	2_{23}	1_{24}	3_{27}	X_{27}	1_{28}	3_{31}	0_{31}	2_{33}	1_{34}	3_{37}	1_{38}	0_{38}	2_{40}	2_{42}	4_{46}	X_{46}	0_{46}		46	25	1.84
10	Josh Treacy	Fremantle	X_{0}	3_{3}	1_{4}	1_{5}	1_{6}	3_{9}	2_{11}	3_{14}	4_{18}	1_{19}	1_{20}	1_{21}	3_{24}	X_{24}	2_{26}	2_{28}	2_{30}	5_{35}	1_{36}	3_{39}	3_{42}	3_{45}	–_{45}	–_{45}	–_{45}					45	20	2.25

Source: AFL Tables

=== Club best and fairest ===
Player(s)	Club	Award	Ref.
Jordan Dawson, Ben Keays	Adelaide	Malcolm Blight Medal	
Lachie Neale	Brisbane Lions	Merrett–Murray Medal	
Patrick Cripps	Carlton	John Nicholls Medal	
Nick Daicos	Collingwood	Copeland Trophy	
Zach Merrett	Essendon	Crichton Medal	
Caleb Serong	Fremantle	Doig Medal	
Max Holmes	Geelong	Carji Greeves Medal	
Sam Collins	Gold Coast	Club Champion	
Jesse Hogan	Greater Western Sydney	Kevin Sheedy Medal	
Jai Newcombe	Hawthorn	Peter Crimmins Medal	
Jack Viney	Melbourne	Keith 'Bluey' Truscott Trophy	
Luke Davies-Uniacke	North Melbourne	Syd Barker Medal	
Zak Butters	Port Adelaide	John Cahill Medal	
Daniel Rioli	Richmond	Jack Dyer Medal	
Callum Wilkie	St Kilda	Trevor Barker Award	
Isaac Heeney	Sydney	Bob Skilton Medal	
Jeremy McGovern	West Coast	John Worsfold Medal	
Marcus Bontempelli	Western Bulldogs	Charles Sutton Medal	

== See also ==
- 2024 AFL Women's season

== Sources ==
- 2024 AFL season at afl.com.au
- 2024 AFL season at AFL Tables
- 2024 AFL season at Australian Football
- 2024 AFL season at Austadiums
