= Jase Burgoyne =

Australian rules footballer (born 2003)

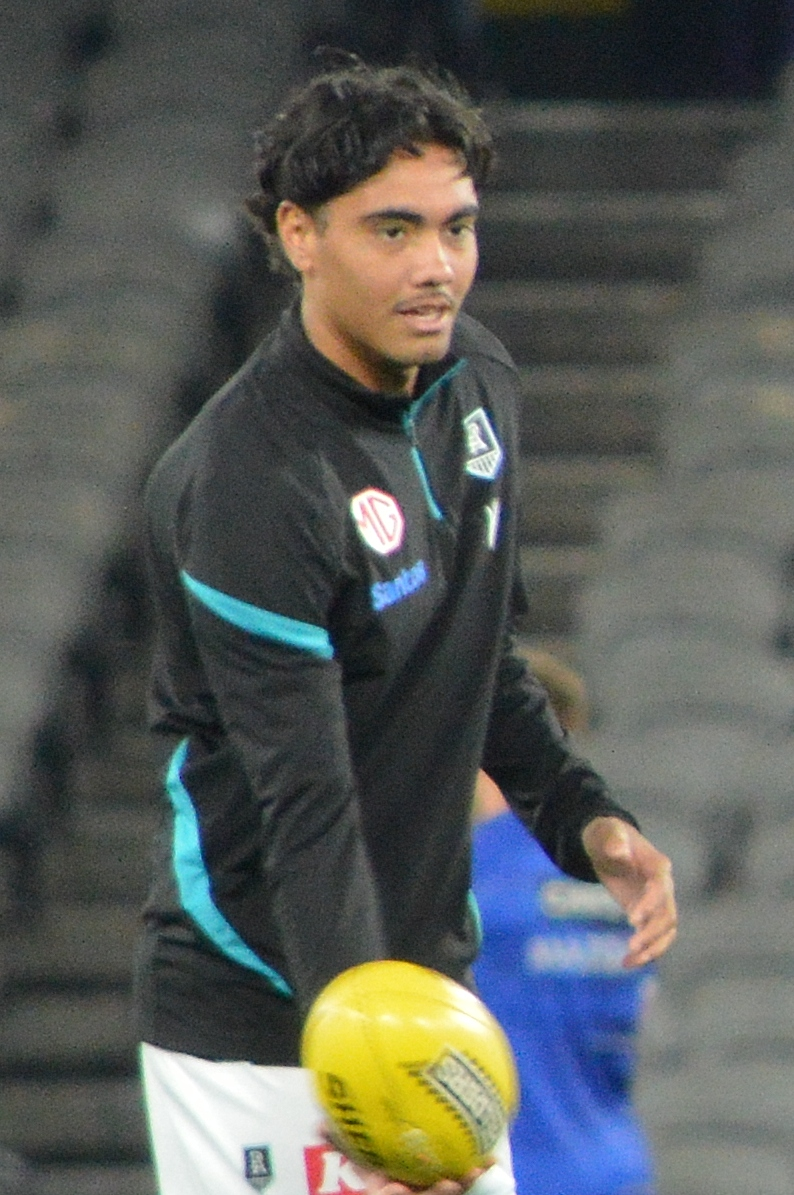
- Burgoyne in March 2026

Personal information
- Full name: Jason Burgoyne
- Born: 15 July 2003 (age 23); Adelaide
- Original team: Port District / Henley High School / Woodville-West Torrens
- Draft: No. 60, 2021 national draft (F/S)
- Debut: 2022, Round 16
- Height: 186 cm (6 ft 1 in)
- Weight: 73 kg (161 lb)
- Position: Wing/Half Back

Club information
- Current club: Port Adelaide
- Number: 7

Playing career^{1}
Years	Club	Games (Goals)
2022–	Port Adelaide	77 (18)

Representative team honours
Years	Team	Games (Goals)
2025	Indigenous All-Stars	1 (0)
- ^{1} Playing statistics correct to the end of round 22, 2026.

Jason Burgoyne is an Australian rules footballer who plays for the Port Adelaide Football Club in the Australian Football League.

== Personal life ==
Burgoyne is a third generation player at Port Adelaide with his grandfather Peter Snr playing at the club in 1977. His father Peter Jnr was a premiership player for Port Adelaide in both the SANFL in 1998 and in the AFL in 2004. Burgoyne's uncle Shaun is a four-time AFL premiership player winning with Port Adelaide, alongside Peter Jnr, in 2004 and with Hawthorn in 2013, 2014 and 2015.

== Statistics ==
Updated to the end of round 22, 2026.

Legend
G	Goals	K	Kicks	D	Disposals	T	Tackles
B	Behinds	H	Handballs	M	Marks

Season	Team	No.	Games	Totals							Averages (per game)							Votes
Season	Team	No.	Games	G	B	K	H	D	M	T	G	B	K	H	D	M	T	Votes
2022	Port Adelaide	36	8	2	1	64	33	97	26	18	0.3	0.1	8.0	4.1	12.1	3.3	2.3	0
2023	Port Adelaide	36	5	0	0	27	17	44	13	6	0.0	0.0	5.4	3.4	8.8	2.6	1.2	0
2024	Port Adelaide	7	23	5	9	252	165	417	114	82	0.2	0.4	11.0	7.2	18.1	5.0	3.6	0
2025	Port Adelaide	7	20	3	2	224	160	384	92	53	0.2	0.1	11.2	8.0	19.2	4.6	2.7	0
2026	Port Adelaide	7	21	8	5	282	164	446	109	76	0.4	0.2	13.4	7.8	21.2	5.2	3.6	0
Career			77	18	17	849	539	1388	354	235	0.2	0.2	11.0	7.0	18.0	4.6	3.1	0
