= Logan McDonald =

Australian football league player (born 2002)

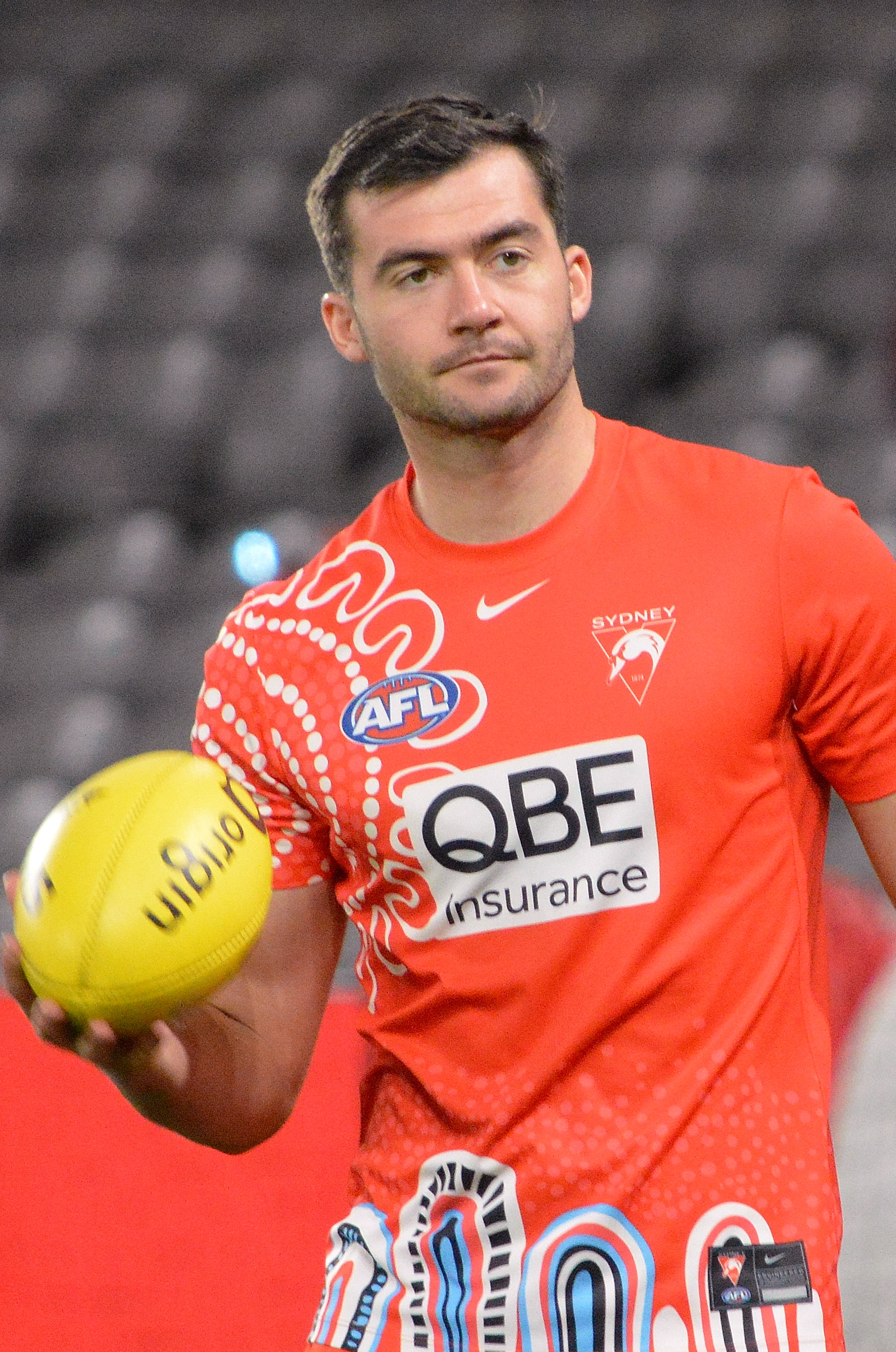
- McDonald in August 2026

Personal information
- Nicknames: Loges, Bruce, The King
- Born: 4 April 2002 (age 24); Bunbury, Western Australia
- Original team: Perth Football Club (WAFL)
- Draft: No. 4, 2020 AFL draft, Sydney
- Debut: 20 March 2021, Sydney vs. Brisbane Lions, at The Gabba
- Height: 196 cm (6 ft 5 in)
- Weight: 86 kg (190 lb)
- Position: Key forward

Club information
- Current club: Sydney
- Number: 6

Playing career^{1}
Years	Club	Games (Goals)
2021–	Sydney	92 (141)
- ^{1} Playing statistics correct to the end of round 22, 2026.

Career highlights
- Rising Star Nomination: 2022

Logan McDonald (born 4 April 2002) is an Australian rules footballer who plays for the Sydney Swans in the Australian Football League (AFL). He was recruited by the Sydney Swans with the 4th draft pick in the 2020 AFL draft.

== Early football ==
McDonald started his playing career at the beginning of high school, with the Applecross Mount Pleasant Junior Football Club in the East Fremantle Junior Football League. He played a total of three years with the club, winning a premiership and participating in 2 grand finals, as well as taking home two best and fairest awards. He also played football for his school, Aquinas College. He was selected in the Under 16s All Australian team in 2018 in the forward line, after he averaged 3 goals a game during his early years with the Perth Football Club. He played 6 games for Perth's colts in 2019, kicking 9 goals with an average of 1.5 a game. He represented Western Australia in the 2019 AFL Under 18 Championships, where he kicked 3 goals in the 3 games he played as a bottom-ager. McDonald lifted his game to a new level in the 2020 WAFL season, kicking 7 goals in the first two games of the season. McDonald finished the season with 21 goals, averaging 2.3 goals per game, winning Perth's goalkicking award and coming runner up in the league's goalkicking award. Draft experts had McDonald placed at being picked anywhere between pick 2 to pick 5, and was eventually taken by Sydney with the 4th pick.

== AFL career ==
=== 2021 ===
McDonald debuted in the opening round of the 2021 AFL season, where Sydney secured a shock 31 point win over Brisbane Lions. On debut, McDonald starred for the Swans, kicking 3 goals. He followed up his performance with another two goals the following week, playing alongside forward superstar Lance Franklin, where they combined to kick 5 goals.

=== 2022 ===
At the start of the 2022 season he was offered a four-year contract by the Sydney Swans. He played 17 games during the 2022 season, but was omitted from the club's 2022 AFL Grand Final team after lean returns through the finals.

=== 2023 ===
McDonald returned to the Swans' side for the 1st game of the 2023 season against Hawthorn, named in the best with a 5 goal performance. He suffered an ankle injury in the round 9 match against Fremantle. For his significantly improved output in the 2023 season, McDonald was named in the AFL Players' Association's 22-under-22 squad, recognising the best players under 22 years of age in the league.

== Statistics ==
Updated to the end of round 22, 2026.

Legend
G	Goals	K	Kicks	D	Disposals	T	Tackles
B	Behinds	H	Handballs	M	Marks

Season	Team	No.	Games	Totals							Averages (per game)							Votes
Season	Team	No.	Games	G	B	K	H	D	M	T	G	B	K	H	D	M	T	Votes
2021	Sydney	6	7	9	5	38	21	59	22	6	1.3	0.7	5.4	3.0	8.4	3.1	0.9	0
2022	Sydney	6	17	15	16	96	49	145	69	26	0.9	0.9	5.6	2.9	8.5	4.1	1.5	0
2023	Sydney	6	20	32	15	131	63	194	84	31	1.6	0.8	6.6	3.2	9.7	4.2	1.6	1
2024	Sydney	6	26	37	24	194	76	270	128	32	1.4	0.9	7.5	2.9	10.4	4.9	1.2	1
2025	Sydney	6	0	—	—	—	—	—	—	—	—	—	—	—	—	—	—	0
2026	Sydney	6	19	37	12	116	80	196	72	25	1.9	0.6	6.1	4.2	10.3	3.8	1.3	0
Career			89	130	72	575	289	864	375	120	1.5	0.8	6.5	3.2	9.7	4.2	1.3	2

== Honours and achievements ==
Team

- Minor Premiership: (Sydney) 2024
- McClelland Trophy: (Sydney) 2026

Individual

- AFL Rising Star nominee: 2022 (round 12)
