= Finn Maginness =

Australian rules footballer (born 2001)

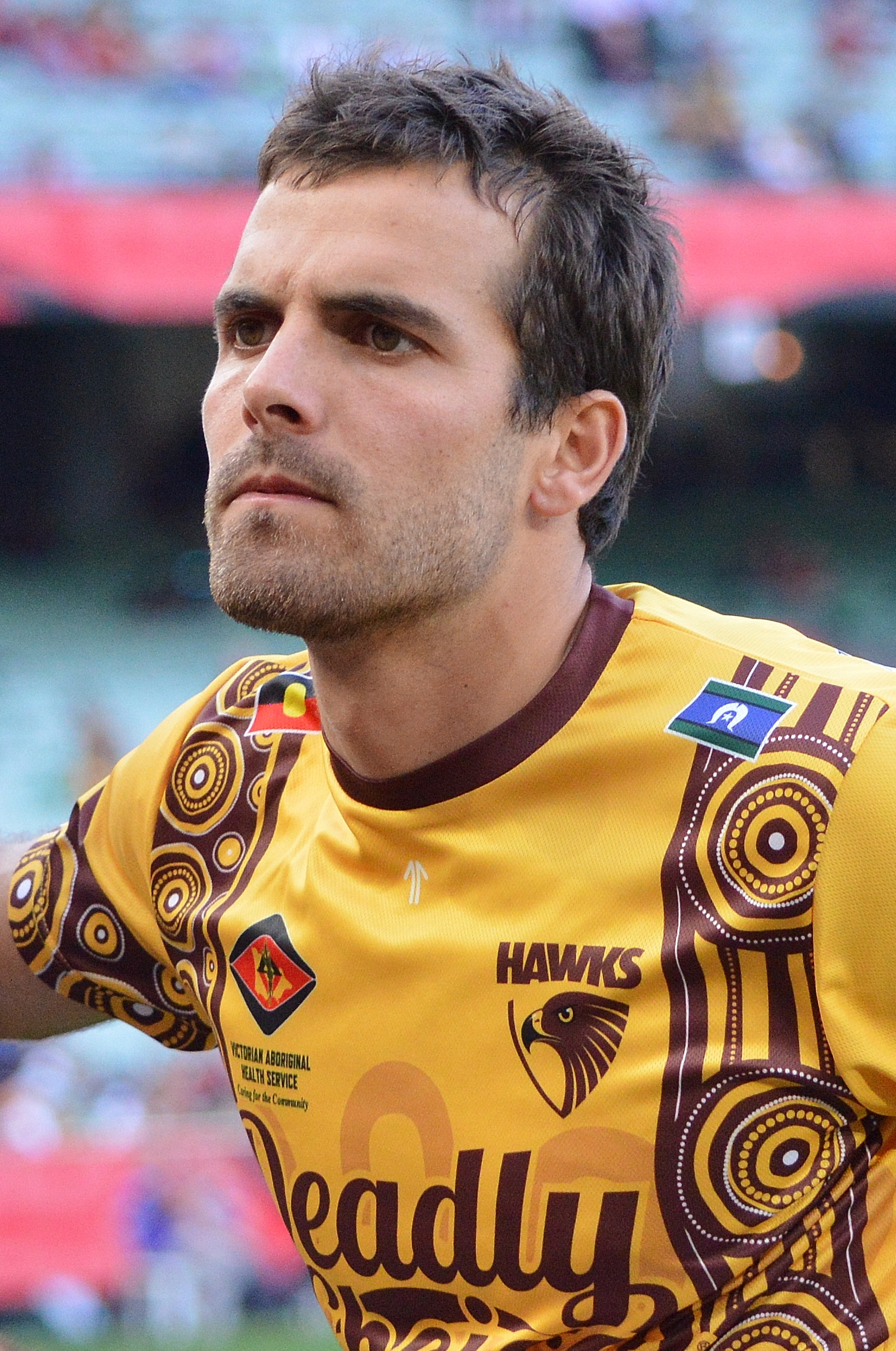
- Maginness in May 2026

Personal information
- Full name: Finn Maginness
- Born: 23 February 2001 (age 25)
- Original team: East Brighton (SMJFL)/Scotch College (APS)/Sandringham Dragons (NAB League)
- Draft: No. 29 (F/S), 2019 national draft
- Debut: Round 17, 2020, Hawthorn vs. Western Bulldogs, at Adelaide Oval
- Height: 189 cm (6 ft 2 in)
- Weight: 88 kg (194 lb)
- Position: Midfield/Forward

Club information
- Current club: Western Bulldogs

Playing career^{1}
Years	Club	Games (Goals)
2020–2026	Hawthorn	64 (16)
2027–	Western Bulldogs	0 (0)
Total		64 (16)
- ^{1} Playing statistics correct to the end of 2026.

Career highlights
- VFL premiership player: 2026

Finn Maginness (born 23 February 2001) is an Australian rules footballer who plays for the Western Bulldogs in the Australian Football League (AFL). He previously played for Hawthorn, continuing a three-generation family tradition after his father and grandfather also played for the club.

== Early career ==
Maginness played for the Sandringham Dragons in 2019 and also represented Vic Metro in four games across that year's national carnival. He also played for his school Scotch College, Melbourne and was captain of the First XVIII. Prior he played community football for East Brighton Vampires in the South Metro Junior Football League.

== AFL career ==
Hawthorn secured Maginness under the father–son rule, after matching North Melbourne's bid with Pick 29 in the 2019 AFL draft.

Maginness had to navigate a difficult COVID-19 affected season. He showed promise during the pre-season games and with scratch matches against other AFL clubs. His patience was rewarded with a round 17 debut against Western Bulldogs.

Throughout 2022 and 2023, Maginness evolved into a tagging role, and quickly became one of the best taggers in the league, shutting down players such as Josh Kelly (Australian footballer), Touk Miller, and Clayton Oliver. He gained widespread praise for his tagging effort on Nick Daicos in Round 21, 2023, restricting Daicos to a career-low 5 disposals before Daicos left the field in the third quarter injured.

Ahead of the 2025 season, Maginness changed his guernsey number to the number 20 that his father wore before him.

Following the 2026 season, Maginness was traded to the Western Bulldogs during the trade period in exchange for a future third round pick from Port Adelaide as part of a 5 club mega-trade deal.

== Personal life ==
Finn's father Scott played 131 games for Hawthorn between 1988 and 1996. His grandfather Norm played 64 games between 1953 and 1958.

Maginness currently studies a Bachelor of Commerce/Bachelor of Laws at Deakin University.

== Statistics ==
Updated to the end of 2026.

Legend
G	Goals	K	Kicks	D	Disposals	T	Tackles
B	Behinds	H	Handballs	M	Marks

Season	Team	No.	Games	Totals							Averages (per game)							Votes
Season	Team	No.	Games	G	B	K	H	D	M	T	G	B	K	H	D	M	T	Votes
2020 (Note: The 2020 season was played with 17 home-and-away matches per team (down from 22) and 16-minute quarters with time on (down from 20-minute quarters with time on) due to the impact of the COVID-19 pandemic.)	Hawthorn	32	1	0	0	2	8	10	0	5	0.0	0.0	2.0	8.0	10.0	0.0	5.0	0
2021	Hawthorn	32	2	0	0	5	10	15	1	5	0.0	0.0	2.5	5.0	7.5	0.5	2.5	0
2022	Hawthorn	32	16	3	7	108	93	201	41	57	0.2	0.4	6.8	5.8	12.6	2.6	3.6	0
2023	Hawthorn	32	13	1	2	65	69	134	41	26	0.1	0.2	5.0	5.3	10.3	3.2	2.0	0
2024	Hawthorn	32	13	6	6	94	88	182	37	23	0.5	0.5	7.2	6.8	14.0	2.8	1.8	0
2025	Hawthorn	20	13	4	6	79	94	173	36	23	0.3	0.5	6.1	7.2	13.3	2.8	1.8	0
2026	Hawthorn	20	6	2	1	28	54	82	11	12	0.3	0.2	4.7	9.0	13.7	1.8	2.0	0
Career			64	16	22	381	416	797	167	151	0.3	0.3	6.0	6.5	12.5	2.6	2.4	0

== Honours and achievements ==
Team

- McClelland Trophy (Hawthorn): 2024
- VFL premiership player (Box Hill): 2026
