= Dave Maginnes =

American football player (1893–1981)

Profile
- Position: Halfback / Wingback

Personal information
- Born: August 4, 1893; Dorchester, Massachusetts, U.S.
- Died: June 26, 1981 (aged 87); Exeter, New Hampshire, U.S.
- Listed height: 5 ft 10 in (1.78 m)
- Listed weight: 165 lb (75 kg)

Career information
- College: Lehigh

Career history
- New York Brickley Giants (1921)
- Stats at Pro Football Reference

William David Maginnes (August 4, 1893 – June 26, 1981) was an American professional football player. He played in the National Football League in 1921 with the New York Brickley Giants (no relation to the modern-day New York Giants).

During his career, Maginnes played with his brother, Al Maginnes.
