= Magin =

Magin is both a surname and a given name. Notable people with the name include:

Surname:

- Alik Magin, Australian rules footballer
- Miłosz Magin (1929–1999), Polish composer and pianist
- Rhys Magin (born 1989), Australian rules footballer
- Theo Magin (1932–2025), German politician

Given name "Magín":

- Magín Berenguer (1918–2000), Spanish archaeologist
- Magín Catalá (1761–1830), Spanish missionary
- Magín Mir – Spanish footballer

== See also ==
- Magin, Iran, a village in Ilam Province, Iran
- Saint Maginus
