= Al Maginnes =

American football player (1897–1966)

Profile
- Position: Tackle

Personal information
- Born: April 5, 1897; Boston, Massachusetts, U.S.
- Died: January 30, 1966 (aged 68)
- Listed height: 6 ft 1 in (1.85 m)
- Listed weight: 188 lb (85 kg)

Career information
- High school: Boston (MA) English
- College: Lehigh

Career history
- Canton Bulldogs (1920); New York Brickley Giants (1921)
- Stats at Pro Football Reference

Albert Bristol Maginnes (April 5, 1897 – January 30, 1966) was a professional football player and lawyer. He played in the National Football League in 1920 with the Canton Bulldogs and in 1921 with the New York Brickley Giants. Brickley's New York Giants are not related to the modern-day New York Giants. While with the Giants, Maginnes was teammates with his brother Dave. He was the father of Nancy Kissinger.

He married Agnes and had three children, two sons Bristol (1931-1987) and David as well as daughter Nancy. A. B. Maginnes would later become an executive at his alma mater, Lehigh University, with the latter eventually honoring his lifetime achievements by naming the College of Arts and Sciences' foundational building after him, Maginnes Hall.
