= Nancy Kissinger =

American foreign policy specialist (1934–2026)

- Kissinger in 1978
- Born: Nancy Sharon Maginnes; April 13, 1934; New York City, U.S.
- Died: August 20, 2026 (aged 92); South Kent, Connecticut, U.S.
- Education: Mount Holyoke College (BA)
- Spouse: Henry Kissinger (m. 1974; died 2023)

Nancy Sharon Kissinger (née Maginnes; April 13, 1934 – August 20, 2026) was an American foreign policy analyst and political aide. She was married to U.S. secretary of state Henry Kissinger, who served from 1973 to 1977.

== Early life and education ==
Nancy Sharon Maginnes was born on April 13, 1934, in Manhattan, New York, to Agnes (née McKinley) and Albert Bristol Maginnes, a wealthy lawyer and former professional football player. She was raised in White Plains and attended The Masters School in nearby Dobbs Ferry.

Kissinger received a Bachelor of Arts degree in history from Mount Holyoke College in 1955.

== Career ==
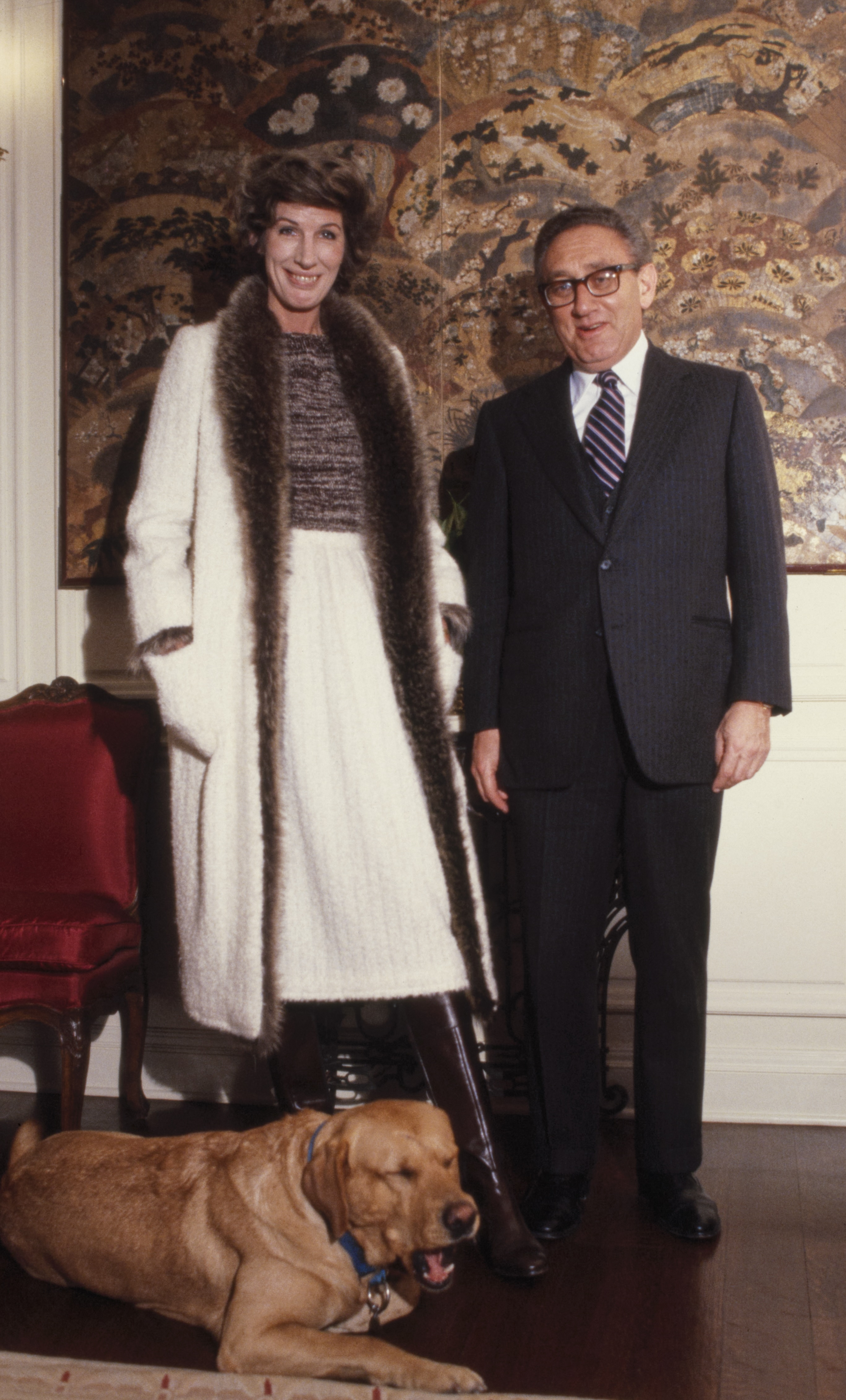
Nancy and Henry Kissinger in 1978

Kissinger initially worked as a foreign policy researcher on a task force led by Harvard University professor Henry Kissinger for New York governor Nelson Rockefeller. She had been recommended to Rockefeller by Kissinger in 1964, under whom she pursued graduate studies at Harvard University. In the late 1960s, she took a sabbatical from her research position to pursue graduate studies at the University of Paris.

After moving to Washington, D.C., during the presidency of Richard Nixon, Kissinger worked at the Rockefeller Brothers Fund. She also became director of international studies for Rockefeller-led Commission on Critical Choices for Americans.

Standing nearly six feet (1.83 m) tall, Kissinger attracted media attention for her height, particularly when accompanying her husband on official diplomatic visits. During a 1975 meeting with Chinese Communist Party leaders, newsreel footage showed Mao Zedong appearing surprised by the height difference between Kissinger and her husband, who stood 5 ft 8 in (1.73 m) tall.

== Personal life and death ==
The Kissingers married on March 30, 1974, in Arlington, Virginia.

Kissinger died in South Kent, Connecticut on August 20, 2026, at the age of 92.
