= Mad Monday =

Celebrations after Australian football

'Mad Monday' is a term used in Australia to refer to the traditional end-of-season celebrations for professional (and sometimes amateur) players of various codes of football. Football matches are typically played on weekends; therefore, as the season nears its end with teams being eliminated, by Sunday night all results have been determined and teams will then know if they are to continue in the finals or if their season is over. Over the years, Mad Monday celebrations have been the catalyst for image-damaging incidents for professional footballers. This has led to calls for the tradition to be banned.
