= Scott Maginness =

Australian rules footballer (born 1966)

Personal information
- Full name: Scott Maginness
- Born: 2 August 1966 (age 60)
- Original team: Mount Waverley Blues (SESFL)/Scotch College (APS)
- Height: 190 cm (6 ft 3 in)
- Weight: 90 kg (198 lb)
- Position: Half-back flank

Playing career^{1}
Years	Club	Games (Goals)
1988–1996	Hawthorn	131 (8)
- ^{1} Playing statistics correct to the end of 1996.

Career highlights
- 2× AFL premiership player: 1988, 1989

Scott Maginness (born 2 August 1966) is a former Australian rules footballer who played with Hawthorn in the VFL/AFL.

Recruited from the Mount Waverley Blues Football Club and Scotch College, Maginness played in the strong Hawthorn sides of the 1980s and early 1990s. He made his debut in 1988 and was a premiership player in his first two seasons. He started on Gary Ablett in the 1989 VFL Grand Final, who kicked four goals in the first quarter and a half, before the bigger and stronger Chris Langford was moved onto Ablett. Despite Ablett's dominance, kicking nine goals and winning the Norm Smith Medal as the best player, Maginness still ended up on the winning side.

He is the son of former Hawthorn player, Norm Maginness. He currently works as a chiropractor.

In 2019 his son, Finn Maginness was drafted by Hawthorn as a father–son draftee.
