= Norm Maginness =

Australian rules footballer

Personal information
- Full name: Norm Maginness
- Born: 29 April 1933 (age 93)
- Original team: Ashburton (ESFL)
- Height: 180 cm (5 ft 11 in)
- Weight: 81 kg (179 lb)
- Position: Half-back

Playing career^{1}
Years	Club	Games (Goals)
1953–1958	Hawthorn	64 (0)
- ^{1} Playing statistics correct to the end of 1958.

Norm Maginness (born 29 April 1933) is a former Australian rules footballer who played with Hawthorn in the Victorian Football League (VFL).

Maginess was recruited from the Ashburton Football Club (Dragons) in the Eastern Suburban Football League.

His son, Scott also played football for Hawthorn and was a member of their 1988 and 1989 premiership winning teams.

His grandson Finn was drafted by Hawthorn in the 2019 AFL draft and debuted in round 17 of the 2020 AFL season.

== Notes ==
"Norm Maginness reclaims his 1958 2nd 18 Premiership Guernsey".
