= Max Holmes =

Australian rules footballer (born 2002)

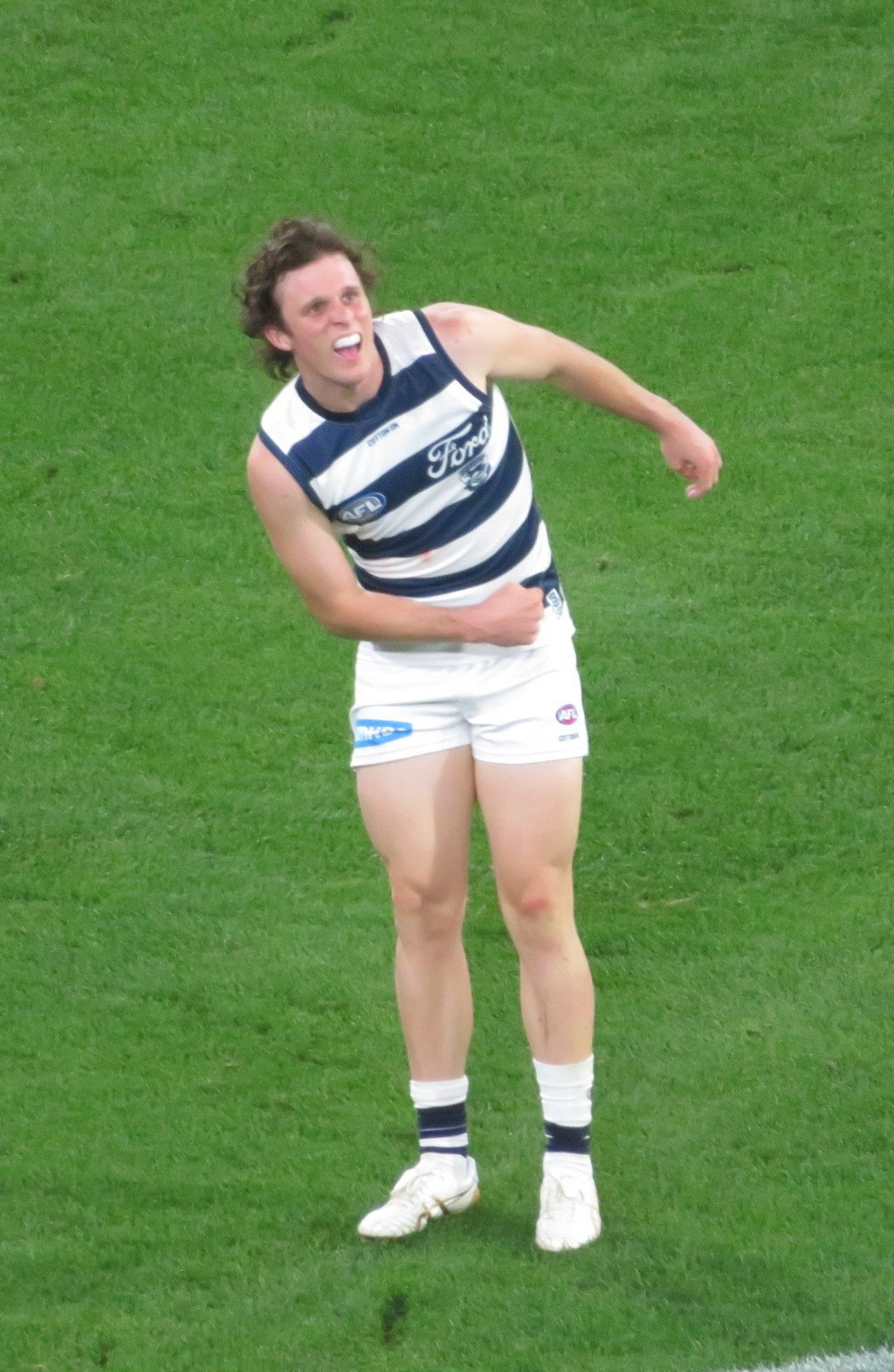
- Holmes playing for Geelong in 2023

Personal information
- Full name: Max Holmes
- Born: 29 August 2002 (age 24)
- Original team: Sandringham Dragons (NAB League) / Melbourne Grammar (APS)
- Draft: No. 20, 2020 national draft
- Debut: Round 3, 2021, Geelong vs. Hawthorn, at the MCG
- Height: 190 cm (6 ft 3 in)
- Weight: 74 kg (163 lb)
- Position: Midfielder

Club information
- Current club: Geelong
- Number: 9

Playing career^{1}
Years	Club	Games (Goals)
2021–	Geelong	122 (53)

Representative team honours^{2}
Years	Team	Games (Goals)
2026–	Victoria	1 (0)
- ^{1} Playing statistics correct to the end of 2026.^{2} Representative statistics correct as of 2026.

Career highlights
- 2× Carji Greeves Medal: 2024, 2025; Geelong best young player: 2021; 22under22 team: 2024

Maxwell John Holmes (born 29 August 2002) is an Australian rules footballer who plays for Geelong in the Australian Football League (AFL).

== Early career ==
Geelong traded their future first round pick with Richmond to secure Pick 20 in the 2020 AFL draft to select Holmes. Holmes made his AFL debut in round 3 of the 2021 AFL season against Hawthorn in the traditional Easter Monday clash. Holmes' mother is former Olympian Lee Naylor. Holmes grew up in East Malvern and played junior football for Prahran and East Malvern Knights in the South Metro Junior Football League.

== AFL career ==
Holmes was an integral part of Geelong's 2022 premiership campaign, but injured his hamstring in Geelong's preliminary final against Brisbane. Holmes was reportedly very close to playing in the Grand Final, but Geelong chose not to select him due to the risk of re-injury, and the significant depth they had.

Holmes won the Grand Final Sprint on AFL Grand Final Day 2023.

Holmes won the 2024 Carji Greeves Medal as Geelong's best and fairest, winning back-to-back awards the following season.

He played every game in 2025, the second-straight year doing so, polling best and fairest votes in all games. He was judged the Cats' best by the coaches in five of those games, against Brisbane (round 3), Gold Coast (round 13), Essendon (round 14), Port Adelaide (round 21) and Brisbane (Grand Final).

The 23-year-old averaged a career-high 26.9 disposals per game this season, including a career-high 40 disposals against Gold Coast in round 15, while also ranking first across the AFL in inside 50s and second in metres gained, showcasing Holmes’ offensive threat and trademark run-and-carry.

Predominately playing in the midfield, Holmes finished second in the AFL for running bounces with 72 and averaged a career-high in clearances. Holmes' year was recognised ahead of the 2025 AFL Awards, earning a spot in the 44-man All-Australian squad for the second-straight year.

== Statistics ==
Updated to the end of round 22, 2026.

Legend
G	Goals	K	Kicks	D	Disposals	T	Tackles
B	Behinds	H	Handballs	M	Marks

Season	Team	No.	Games	Totals							Averages (per game)							Votes
Season	Team	No.	Games	G	B	K	H	D	M	T	G	B	K	H	D	M	T	Votes
2021	Geelong	9	12	1	7	54	64	118	24	32	0.1	0.6	4.5	5.3	9.8	2.0	2.7	0
2022	Geelong	9	18	13	6	161	119	280	68	42	0.7	0.3	8.9	6.6	15.6	3.8	2.3	2
2023	Geelong	9	21	7	5	228	172	400	69	88	0.3	0.2	10.9	8.2	19.0	3.3	4.2	1
2024	Geelong	9	25	13	6	374	231	605	140	74	0.5	0.2	15.0	9.2	24.2	5.6	3.0	10
2025	Geelong	9	26	14	10	436	263	699	140	92	0.5	0.4	16.8	10.1	26.9	5.4	3.5	18
2026	Geelong	9	18	4	5	308	217	525	88	55	0.2	0.3	17.1	12.1	29.2	4.9	3.1	10
Career			120	52	39	1561	1066	2627	529	383	0.4	0.3	13.0	8.9	21.9	4.4	3.2	41

== Honours and achievements ==
Team

- McClelland Trophy (Geelong): 2022

Individual

- Geelong F.C. Best Young Player Award: 2021
- 2× Carji Greeves Medal: 2024, 2025
- 22under22 team: 2024
