= 2025 AFL season =

129th season of the Australian Football League (AFL)

2025 AFL premiership season

Overview
- Date: 7 March – 27 September 2025
- Teams: 18
- Premiers: Brisbane Lions; 5th premiership
- Runners-up: Geelong; 11th runners-up result
- Minor premiers: Adelaide; 3rd minor premiership
- Brownlow Medallist: Matt Rowell (Gold Coast); 39 votes
- Coleman Medallist: Jeremy Cameron (Geelong); 83 goals

Attendance
- Matches played: 216
- Total attendance: 8,257,027 (38,227 per match)
- Highest (H&A): 92,044 (round 7, Collingwood v Essendon)
- Highest (finals): 100,022 (grand final, Geelong v Brisbane Lions)

The 2025 AFL season was the 129th season of the Australian Football League (AFL), the highest-level senior men's Australian rules football competition in Australia. The season featured 18 clubs and ran from 7 March to 27 September, comprising a 23-match home-and-away season over 25 rounds, followed by a four-week finals series featuring the top eight clubs.

The Brisbane Lions won the premiership, defeating Geelong by 47 points in the 2025 AFL Grand Final; it was their second consecutive premiership and fifth AFL premiership overall. Adelaide won the minor premiership by finishing atop the home-and-away ladder with an 18–5 win–loss record, but lost both of its finals. Gold Coast's Matt Rowell won the Brownlow Medal as the league's best and fairest player, and Geelong's Jeremy Cameron won his second Coleman Medal as the league's leading goalkicker.

== Background ==
In September 2022, the AFL announced a seven-year, $4.5 billion broadcast rights deal with the Seven Network, Foxtel and Telstra, the biggest sports broadcast rights deal in Australian history, effective from the 2025 season. Key points of the deal included:

- Seven and its streaming service 7plus would broadcast Thursday night, Friday night, Sunday afternoon and all marquee matches, with the first 16 (Note: The deal originally covered the first 15 rounds, however with the addition of Opening Round, this was extended to 16 rounds ahead of the 2025 season.) rounds of the home-and-away season featuring Thursday night matches.
- Foxtel and its streaming service Kayo would broadcast every match of the season outside of the grand final, and would utilise its own commentary teams and graphics for all matches for the first time; another Foxtel streaming service, Binge, would also simulcast some matches and include other Foxtel football programs.
- All Saturday matches outside of marquee matches would be exclusive to Foxtel and Kayo for the first eight rounds of the season, while all Saturday night matches in the last eight rounds of the season would be exclusive to Seven.
- Seven would broadcast matches involving non-Victorian clubs live into their local markets, outside of select matches on delay.

Ahead of the season's fixture release in November, the AFL further elaborated that the home-and-away season would feature Thursday night matches in 23 of the 25 rounds, with each of the first 16 rounds plus seven other rounds – as part of a floating fixture to be determined later in the season – having matches scheduled on Thursday nights. The following day, the AFL announced the addition on Sunday night matches as a semi-regular fixture in 2025, with nine of the first 16 rounds featuring a Sunday night match. In the same month, Adelaide and St Kilda unveiled new club logos, while Gold Coast unveiled a new logo and playing guernseys as part of a rebrand of the club. A match between the Indigenous All-Stars and Fremantle took place at Optus Stadium in February 2025, marking the first Indigenous All-Stars match since 2015.

== Coach appointments ==
New coach	Club	Date of appointment	Previous coach	Ref.
Andrew McQualter	West Coast	30 September 2024	Adam Simpson	
Dean Cox	Sydney	26 November 2024	John Longmire	

== Club leadership ==
Club	Coach	Leadership group		
Club	Coach	Captain(s)	Vice-captain(s)	Other leader(s)
Adelaide	Matthew Nicks	Jordan Dawson	Darcy Fogarty, Ben Keays, Alex Neal-Bullen, Reilly O'Brien	
Brisbane Lions	Chris Fagan	Harris Andrews, Lachie Neale	Josh Dunkley, Hugh McCluggage	Jarrod Berry, Charlie Cameron, Oscar McInerney, Cameron Rayner, Brandon Starcevich
Carlton	Michael Voss	Patrick Cripps	Charlie Curnow, Sam Walsh, Jacob Weitering	
Collingwood	Craig McRae	Darcy Moore	Nick Daicos, Brayden Maynard	Darcy Cameron, Jamie Elliott, Daniel McStay, Isaac Quaynor
Essendon	Brad Scott	Zach Merrett	Andrew McGrath	Kyle Langford, Nic Martin, Mason Redman
Fremantle	Justin Longmuir	Alex Pearce	Andrew Brayshaw, Caleb Serong	Jaeger O'Meara, Sam Switkowski, Josh Treacy, Hayden Young
Geelong	Chris Scott	Patrick Dangerfield	Tom Stewart	
Gold Coast	Damien Hardwick	Noah Anderson	Sam Collins, Touk Miller	Ben King, Wil Powell, Matt Rowell
Greater Western Sydney	Adam Kingsley	Toby Greene	Stephen Coniglio, Josh Kelly	Jack Buckley, Brent Daniels, Tom Green, Connor Idun, Sam Taylor
Hawthorn	Sam Mitchell	James Sicily	Dylan Moore	
Melbourne	Simon Goodwin	Max Gawn	Jack Viney	
North Melbourne	Alastair Clarkson	Jy Simpkin	Nick Larkey, Harry Sheezel	
Port Adelaide	Ken Hinkley	Connor Rozee	Zak Butters	Willem Drew, Sam Powell-Pepper
Richmond	Adem Yze	Toby Nankervis		Nathan Broad, Tom Lynch, Jayden Short, Tim Taranto
St Kilda	Ross Lyon	Jack Steele	Jack Sinclair, Callum Wilkie	Dan Butler, Mason Wood
Sydney	Dean Cox	Callum Mills		
West Coast	Andrew McQualter	Oscar Allen, Liam Duggan	Jeremy McGovern	Liam Baker, Jack Graham, Jake Waterman
Western Bulldogs	Luke Beveridge	Marcus Bontempelli	Tom Liberatore (vc), Aaron Naughton (dvc)	Bailey Dale, Taylor Duryea, Liam Jones, Ed Richards, Cody Weightman

== Pre-season ==
=== Indigenous All-Stars match ===
Starting time is local time. Source: afl.com.au

Indigenous All-Stars match
Saturday, 15 February (4:30 pm)	Indigenous All-Stars 16.12 (108)	def.	Fremantle 9.11 (65)	Optus Stadium (crowd: 37,865)	Report
5.2 (32); 7.5 (47); 12.8 (80); 16.12 (108)	Q1; Q2; Q3; Q4	2.3 (15); 5.5 (35); 7.8 (50); 9.11 (65)	Polly Farmer Medal: Jy Simpkin
Bobby Hill 4, Horne-Francis 3, Cameron, Kelly, Motlop, Pickett, W. Rioli, Ryan, Simpkin, Stengle, Walters	Goals	Frederick 3, Amiss 2, Jackson 2, Sharp 2
Bobby Hill, Horne-Francis, Simpkin, Humphries, Ah Chee, Burgoyne	Best	Frederick, Serong, Sharp, O'Driscoll, Draper

=== Practice matches ===
All starting times are local time. Sources: afl.com.au (results); Austadiums (crowds)

	Official practice matches
Tuesday, 25 February (7:20 pm)	Geelong 12.11 (83)	def. by	Essendon 17.2 (104)	GMHBA Stadium (crowd: 11,626)	Report
Wednesday, 26 February (7:10 pm)	Richmond 6.13 (49)	def. by	Collingwood 21.6 (132)	Ikon Park (crowd: 7,911)	Report
Thursday, 27 February (5:20 pm)	Hawthorn 9.12 (66)	def. by	Western Bulldogs 11.11 (77)	University of Tasmania Stadium (crowd: 3,516)	Report
Thursday, 27 February (7:10 pm)	Brisbane Lions 13.16 (94)	def. by	Adelaide 14.13 (97)	Brighton Homes Arena (crowd: 4,959)	Report
Friday, 28 February (5:20 pm)	Greater Western Sydney 9.12 (66)	def. by	Carlton 18.16 (124)	Corroboree Group Oval (crowd: 8,021)	Report
Friday, 28 February (7:10 pm)	Gold Coast 8.15 (63)	def. by	Sydney 12.12 (84)	People First Stadium (crowd: 3,168)	Report
Saturday, 1 March (3:10 pm)	St Kilda 7.7 (49)	def. by	Port Adelaide 14.9 (93)	RSEA Park (crowd: 6,217)	Report
Saturday, 1 March (3:10 pm)	West Coast 11.5 (71)	def.	North Melbourne 9.15 (69)	Hands Oval (crowd: 7,032)	Report
Sunday, 2 March (3:10 pm)	Fremantle 16.13 (109)	def.	Melbourne 11.24 (90)	Lane Group Stadium (crowd: 7,458)	Report

== Overview ==
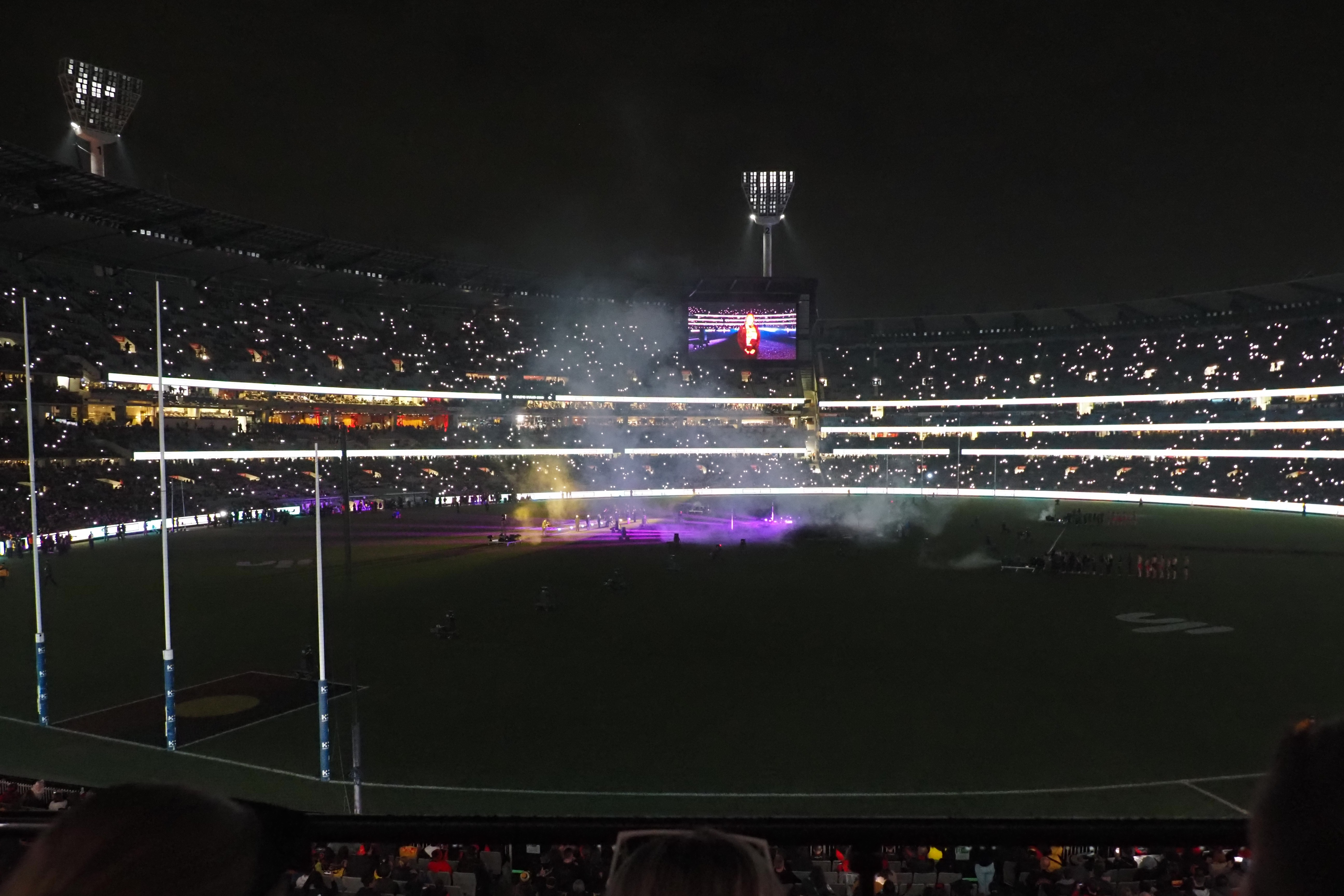
A view of the Melbourne Cricket Ground during the Dreamtime at the 'G pre-match ceremony

The season began with Opening Round, an initiative introduced in 2024, in which the New South Wales and Queensland clubs (Brisbane Lions, Gold Coast, Greater Western Sydney and Sydney) contest matches against four Victorian clubs (Geelong, Essendon, Collingwood and Hawthorn, respectively, in 2025) to open the season; the eight clubs involved would then have a bye before round 5 so that all clubs would have played the same number of matches leading into Gather Round. In the two Queensland matches, the Brisbane Lions were to host Geelong and unfurl their 2024 premiership flag on 6 March to open the season, and Gold Coast was to host Essendon on 8 March; however, on 4 March the decision was made to postpone both matches due to the projected impact of Cyclone Alfred, which was forecast to make landfall in Brisbane later that week. The matches were rescheduled for rounds 3 and 24, respectively.

The Western Bulldogs hosted a match against Collingwood at the Melbourne Cricket Ground in round 2, their first home match at the venue since 2009, to celebrate the centenary of their entry into the VFL/AFL; to celebrate the occasion, the club reverted to its former name, Footscray, for the round. In round 5, Gather Round, which was played in South Australia for the third consecutive year, featured matches in the Barossa Valley region for the first time, with two matches played at Barossa Park, a new $40 million recreational facility in Lyndoch, along with two matches at Norwood Oval and the other five at Adelaide Oval, including two separately ticketed matches on the Saturday. Hawthorn also hosted a match to celebrate its 100-year anniversary in the VFL/AFL, against Richmond in round 8.

In round 11, during Sir Doug Nicholls Round, the Dreamtime at the 'G match between Essendon and Richmond was moved to the Friday night primetime slot for the first time, having traditionally been held on a Saturday night during the round; two separately ticketed matches were held back-to-back the following day at Marvel Stadium, featuring several Sir Doug Nicholls Round activities in the Docklands precinct throughout the day. North Melbourne commenced a new arrangement to play two of its home matches each season in Western Australia from 2025 to 2027 – each against one of the two Western Australian clubs, Fremantle and West Coast, with one match played at Hands Oval, Bunbury, and the other at Optus Stadium – as part of a deal with the AFL, Tourism Western Australia and the Western Australian government to provide financial security to the club, and as part of its strategy to exit its existing deal to play home matches in Hobart, where it had played at least two per season since 2012; in 2025, the club played its Western Australian home matches consecutively, in rounds 13 and 14, and two matches in Hobart as part of the final year of the club's deal with the state.

From round 16 onwards, the start times for Sunday afternoon matches televised by the Seven Network were moved forward by five minutes to avoid prolonged matches stretching past 6:00 pm AEST and delaying the network's flagship Melbourne news bulletin which follows immediately after.

== Home-and-away season ==
All starting times are local time. Source: afl.com.au

=== Opening Round ===
	Opening Round
Thursday, 6 March (postponed)	Brisbane Lions	v	Geelong	The Gabba
Friday, 7 March (7:40 pm)	Sydney 11.10 (76)	def. by	Hawthorn 14.12 (96)	Sydney Cricket Ground (crowd: 40,310)	Report; Stats
Saturday, 8 March (postponed)	Gold Coast	v	Essendon	People First Stadium
Sunday, 9 March (3:20 pm)	Greater Western Sydney 15.14 (104)	def.	Collingwood 6.16 (52)	Engie Stadium (crowd: 19,248)	Report; Stats
	Bye: Adelaide; Brisbane Lions; Carlton; Essendon; Fremantle; Geelong; Gold Coast; Melbourne; North Melbourne; Port Adelaide; Richmond; St Kilda; West Coast; Western Bulldogs
The Brisbane Lions v Geelong and Gold Coast v Essendon matches were postponed due to the projected impact of Cyclone Alfred in south-east Queensland; the matches were rescheduled for rounds 3 and 24 respectively.

=== Round 1 ===
	Round 1
Thursday, 13 March (7:30 pm)	Richmond 13.4 (82)	def.	Carlton 9.15 (69)	Melbourne Cricket Ground (crowd: 80,009)	Report; Stats
Friday, 14 March (7:40 pm)	Hawthorn 17.9 (111)	def.	Essendon 12.13 (85)	Melbourne Cricket Ground (crowd: 80,735)	Report; Stats
Saturday, 15 March (1:20 pm)	Geelong 23.9 (147)	def.	Fremantle 10.9 (69)	GMHBA Stadium (crowd: 25,372)	Report; Stats
Saturday, 15 March (4:15 pm)	Sydney 12.10 (82)	def. by	Brisbane Lions 12.14 (86)	Sydney Cricket Ground (crowd: 34,906)	Report; Stats
Saturday, 15 March (7:35 pm)	Western Bulldogs 17.11 (113)	def.	North Melbourne 14.13 (97)	Marvel Stadium (crowd: 34,406)	Report; Stats
Saturday, 15 March (7:35 pm)	Collingwood 21.10 (136)	def.	Port Adelaide 6.9 (45)	Melbourne Cricket Ground (crowd: 63,282)	Report; Stats
Sunday, 16 March (12:05 pm)	Adelaide 21.9 (135)	def.	St Kilda 10.12 (72)	Adelaide Oval (crowd: 42,985)	Report; Stats
Sunday, 16 March (3:20 pm)	Melbourne 11.8 (74)	def. by	Greater Western Sydney 11.11 (77)	Melbourne Cricket Ground (crowd: 23,278)	Report; Stats
Sunday, 16 March (3:10 pm)	West Coast 7.7 (49)	def. by	Gold Coast 20.16 (136)	Optus Stadium (crowd: 46,532)	Report; Stats
The crowd of 80,735 for the Hawthorn v Essendon match is the largest crowd for a home-and-away match between the two clubs.; The combined attendance for round 1 was 431,505, breaking the record for the highest-attended home-and-away round in VFL/AFL history.

=== Round 2 ===
	Round 2
Thursday, 20 March (7:30 pm)	Carlton 8.12 (60)	def. by	Hawthorn 12.8 (80)	Melbourne Cricket Ground (crowd: 62,735)	Report; Stats
Friday, 21 March (7:40 pm)	Western Bulldogs 10.10 (70)	def. by	Collingwood 10.16 (76)	Melbourne Cricket Ground (crowd: 78,027)	Report; Stats
Saturday, 22 March (1:20 pm)	Essendon 15.10 (100)	def. by	Adelaide 25.11 (161)	Melbourne Cricket Ground (crowd: 46,688)	Report; Stats
Saturday, 22 March (3:45 pm)	Port Adelaide 21.14 (140)	def.	Richmond 9.14 (68)	Adelaide Oval (crowd: 37,342)	Report; Stats
Saturday, 22 March (7:35 pm)	St Kilda 15.8 (98)	def.	Geelong 13.13 (91)	Marvel Stadium (crowd: 36,663)	Report; Stats
Sunday, 23 March (12:10 pm)	Brisbane Lions 14.10 (94)	def.	West Coast 11.9 (75)	The Gabba (crowd: 30,012)	Report; Stats
Sunday, 23 March (3:20 pm)	North Melbourne 19.11 (125)	def.	Melbourne 9.12 (66)	Marvel Stadium (crowd: 28,768)	Report; Stats
Sunday, 23 March (3:10 pm)	Fremantle 9.11 (65)	def. by	Sydney 9.14 (68)	Optus Stadium (crowd: 43,882)	Report; Stats
	Bye: Gold Coast; Greater Western Sydney
The Western Bulldogs reverted to their former name, Footscray, for round 2 to celebrate the centenary of the club's entry into the VFL/AFL.; Collingwood players Scott Pendlebury and Steele Sidebottom played their 308th match as teammates during the match against Western Bulldogs, breaking the VFL/AFL record for the most matches two teammates have played in together.; The crowd of 78,027 for the Western Bulldogs v Collingwood match is the largest crowd for a home-and-away match involving the Western Bulldogs.; Adelaide's score of 25.11 (161) against Essendon was the highest by a non-Victorian club at the Melbourne Cricket Ground since 2013.; Adelaide's win over Essendon was its first at the Melbourne Cricket Ground since 2017, ending a streak of eleven matches without a win at the venue.

=== Round 3 ===
	Round 3
Thursday, 27 March (7:30 pm)	Essendon 9.18 (72)	def.	Port Adelaide 8.12 (60)	Marvel Stadium (crowd: 25,114)	Report; Stats
Friday, 28 March (7:40 pm)	Carlton 11.9 (75)	def. by	Western Bulldogs 12.11 (83)	Marvel Stadium (crowd: 44,894)	Report; Stats
Saturday, 29 March (1:20 pm)	Melbourne 8.14 (62)	def. by	Gold Coast 18.12 (120)	Melbourne Cricket Ground (crowd: 24,506)	Report; Stats
Saturday, 29 March (4:15 pm)	St Kilda 20.15 (135)	def.	Richmond 7.11 (53)	Marvel Stadium (crowd: 41,147)	Report; Stats
Saturday, 29 March (7:35 pm)	Hawthorn 10.16 (76)	def.	Greater Western Sydney 9.10 (64)	University of Tasmania Stadium (crowd: 14,021)	Report; Stats
Saturday, 29 March (6:35 pm)	Brisbane Lions 10.10 (70)	def.	Geelong 9.7 (61)	The Gabba (crowd: 27,966)	Report; Stats
Sunday, 30 March (2:50 pm)	Adelaide 17.12 (114)	def.	North Melbourne 12.6 (78)	Adelaide Oval (crowd: 46,511)	Report; Stats
Sunday, 30 March (3:10 pm)	West Coast 10.8 (68)	def. by	Fremantle 15.16 (106)	Optus Stadium (crowd: 53,289)	Report; Stats
	Bye: Collingwood; Sydney
Gold Coast defeated Melbourne for the first time since 2014, ending a twelve-match losing streak.

=== Round 4 ===
	Round 4
Thursday, 3 April (7:30 pm)	Collingwood 8.15 (63)	def.	Carlton 6.10 (46)	Melbourne Cricket Ground (crowd: 82,058)	Report; Stats
Friday, 4 April (7:40 pm)	Geelong 12.13 (85)	def.	Melbourne 6.10 (46)	GMHBA Stadium (crowd: 30,397)	Report; Stats
Saturday, 5 April (12:20 pm)	Gold Coast 13.13 (91)	def.	Adelaide 14.6 (90)	People First Stadium (crowd: 16,211)	Report; Stats
Saturday, 5 April (4:15 pm)	Richmond 13.12 (90)	def. by	Brisbane Lions 18.10 (118)	Melbourne Cricket Ground (crowd: 42,578)	Report; Stats
Saturday, 5 April (7:35 pm)	North Melbourne 8.4 (52)	def. by	Sydney 18.9 (117)	Marvel Stadium (crowd: 31,955)	Report; Stats
Sunday, 6 April (1:10 pm)	Greater Western Sydney 20.12 (132)	def.	West Coast 7.9 (51)	Engie Stadium (crowd: 9,231)	Report; Stats
Sunday, 6 April (2:50 pm)	Port Adelaide 10.12 (72)	def. by	St Kilda 13.11 (89)	Adelaide Oval (crowd: 34,201)	Report; Stats
Sunday, 6 April (3:10 pm)	Fremantle 15.7 (97)	def.	Western Bulldogs 12.9 (81)	Optus Stadium (crowd: 41,491)	Report; Stats
	Bye: Essendon; Hawthorn
Greater Western Sydney's 81-point win was its biggest over West Coast.

=== Round 5 ===
	Round 5 (Gather Round)
Thursday, 10 April (7:10 pm)	Adelaide 15.10 (100)	def. by	Geelong 18.11 (119)	Adelaide Oval (crowd: 50,073)	Report; Stats
Friday, 11 April (7:10 pm)	Collingwood 16.13 (109)	def.	Sydney 12.6 (78)	Adelaide Oval (crowd: 47,649)	Report; Stats
Saturday, 12 April (12:05 pm)	North Melbourne 13.11 (89)	def. by	Gold Coast 21.15 (141)	Barossa Park (crowd: 9,317)	Report; Stats
Saturday, 12 April (12:50 pm)	Carlton 17.19 (121)	def.	West Coast 6.14 (50)	Adelaide Oval (crowd: 41,252)	Report; Stats
Saturday, 12 April (3:45 pm)	Western Bulldogs 14.13 (97)	def. by	Brisbane Lions 18.10 (118)	Norwood Oval (crowd: 9,242)	Report; Stats
Saturday, 12 April (7:05 pm)	Melbourne 8.9 (57)	def. by	Essendon 15.6 (96)	Adelaide Oval (crowd: 45,039)	Report; Stats
Sunday, 13 April (12:05 pm)	Richmond 7.5 (47)	def. by	Fremantle 16.12 (108)	Barossa Park (crowd: 10,028)	Report; Stats
Sunday, 13 April (2:50 pm)	St Kilda 12.10 (82)	def. by	Greater Western Sydney 16.14 (110)	Norwood Oval (crowd: 9,235)	Report; Stats
Sunday, 13 April (6:50 pm)	Port Adelaide 18.13 (121)	def.	Hawthorn 14.7 (91)	Adelaide Oval (crowd: 47,671)	Report; Stats

=== Round 6 ===
	Round 6
Thursday, 17 April (7:30 pm)	Brisbane Lions 7.11 (53)	def. by	Collingwood 16.9 (105)	The Gabba (crowd: 34,802)	Report; Stats
Friday, 18 April (3:20 pm)	North Melbourne 11.5 (71)	def. by	Carlton 24.9 (153)	Marvel Stadium (crowd: 46,373)	Report; Stats
Friday, 18 April (4:10 pm)	West Coast 11.9 (75)	def. by	Essendon 11.11 (77)	Optus Stadium (crowd: 46,080)	Report; Stats
Saturday, 19 April (1:20 pm)	Melbourne 16.11 (107)	def.	Fremantle 14.13 (97)	Melbourne Cricket Ground (crowd: 25,202)	Report; Stats
Saturday, 19 April (3:45 pm)	Adelaide 7.10 (52)	def.	Greater Western Sydney 4.10 (34)	Adelaide Oval (crowd: 40,062)	Report; Stats
Saturday, 19 April (7:35 pm)	Richmond 12.8 (80)	def.	Gold Coast 9.15 (69)	Marvel Stadium (crowd: 18,423)	Report; Stats
Sunday, 20 April (3:20 pm)	Sydney 10.17 (77)	def. by	Port Adelaide 13.7 (85)	Sydney Cricket Ground (crowd: 36,636)	Report; Stats
Sunday, 20 April (7:20 pm)	Western Bulldogs 18.19 (127)	def.	St Kilda 8.8 (56)	Marvel Stadium (crowd: 35,511)	Report; Stats
Monday, 21 April (3:20 pm)	Geelong 12.14 (86)	def.	Hawthorn 11.13 (79)	Melbourne Cricket Ground (crowd: 88,746)	Report; Stats
The Brisbane Lions' loss to Collingwood ended a ten-match winning streak.; The crowd of 18,423 for the Richmond v Gold Coast match was the lowest for a Richmond home match in Victoria (Note: Excluding the COVID-19-affected 2020 and 2021 seasons) since 2003.; Richmond's win over Gold Coast was its first at Marvel Stadium since 2021, ending an eleven-match losing streak at the venue.; The crowd of 88,746 for the Geelong v Hawthorn match is the largest crowd for a home-and-away match involving Geelong.

=== Round 7 ===
	Round 7 (Anzac Appeal Round)
Thursday, 24 April (7:30 pm)	Melbourne 12.11 (83)	def.	Richmond 9.9 (63)	Melbourne Cricket Ground (crowd: 71,635)	Report; Stats
Friday, 25 April (3:20 pm)	Collingwood 16.11 (107)	def.	Essendon 10.6 (66)	Melbourne Cricket Ground (crowd: 92,044)	Report; Stats
Friday, 25 April (6:10 pm)	Fremantle 12.13 (85)	def.	Adelaide 9.13 (67)	Optus Stadium (crowd: 53,048)	Report; Stats
Saturday, 26 April (1:20 pm)	St Kilda 11.7 (73)	def. by	Brisbane Lions 17.16 (118)	Marvel Stadium (crowd: 29,901)	Report; Stats
Saturday, 26 April (3:45 pm)	Port Adelaide 14.13 (97)	def.	North Melbourne 13.10 (88)	Adelaide Oval (crowd: 35,004)	Report; Stats
Saturday, 26 April (7:35 pm)	Greater Western Sydney 12.9 (81)	def. by	Western Bulldogs 17.11 (113)	Corroboree Group Oval (crowd: 12,234)	Report; Stats
Sunday, 27 April (1:10 pm)	Gold Coast 17.15 (117)	def.	Sydney 12.7 (79)	People First Stadium (crowd: 18,034)	Report; Stats
Sunday, 27 April (3:20 pm)	Carlton 14.10 (94)	def.	Geelong 12.4 (76)	Melbourne Cricket Ground (crowd: 67,658)	Report; Stats
Sunday, 27 April (4:40 pm)	Hawthorn 18.16 (124)	def.	West Coast 11.8 (74)	Marvel Stadium (crowd: 26,425)	Report; Stats

=== Round 8 ===
	Round 8
Thursday, 1 May (7:30 pm)	Essendon 9.11 (65)	def.	North Melbourne 9.8 (62)	Marvel Stadium (crowd: 35,439)	Report; Stats
Friday, 2 May (7:40 pm)	St Kilda 14.10 (94)	def.	Fremantle 5.3 (33)	Marvel Stadium (crowd: 20,522)	Report; Stats
Saturday, 3 May (1:20 pm)	Western Bulldogs 20.11 (131)	def.	Port Adelaide 5.11 (41)	Mars Stadium (crowd: 4,814)	Report; Stats
Saturday, 3 May (3:45 pm)	Adelaide 16.14 (110)	def.	Carlton 7.8 (50)	Adelaide Oval (crowd: 46,057)	Report; Stats
Saturday, 3 May (7:35 pm)	Collingwood 12.15 (87)	def. by	Geelong 13.12 (90)	Melbourne Cricket Ground (crowd: 82,514)	Report; Stats
Saturday, 3 May (5:35 pm)	West Coast 11.10 (76)	def. by	Melbourne 16.12 (108)	Optus Stadium (crowd: 41,991)	Report; Stats
Sunday, 4 May (1:10 pm)	Sydney 12.15 (87)	def.	Greater Western Sydney 10.13 (73)	Sydney Cricket Ground (crowd: 39,260)	Report; Stats
Sunday, 4 May (3:20 pm)	Hawthorn 16.13 (109)	def.	Richmond 6.8 (44)	Melbourne Cricket Ground (crowd: 62,321)	Report; Stats
Sunday, 4 May (7:20 pm)	Brisbane Lions 9.12 (66)	def.	Gold Coast 7.7 (49)	The Gabba (crowd: 33,612)	Report; Stats
Jack Crisp (Collingwood) played his 245th consecutive match in the match against Geelong, breaking the VFL/AFL record previously held by Jim Stynes (Melbourne); Crisp had a shot at goal after the final siren to win the match, but kicked a behind.; The crowd of 33,612 for the Brisbane Lions v Gold Coast match is the largest crowd for a home-and-away QClash.

=== Round 9 ===
	Round 9
Thursday, 8 May (6:10 pm)	Fremantle 12.11 (83)	def. by	Collingwood 15.7 (97)	Optus Stadium (crowd: 47,780)	Report; Stats
Friday, 9 May (7:40 pm)	St Kilda 9.8 (62)	def. by	Carlton 11.11 (77)	Melbourne Cricket Ground (crowd: 65,680)	Report; Stats
Saturday, 10 May (1:20 pm)	Melbourne 7.14 (56)	def. by	Hawthorn 13.13 (91)	Melbourne Cricket Ground (crowd: 50,351)	Report; Stats
Saturday, 10 May (4:15 pm)	Essendon 11.5 (71)	def.	Sydney 8.15 (63)	Marvel Stadium (crowd: 43,799)	Report; Stats
Saturday, 10 May (7:35 pm)	Gold Coast 15.16 (106)	def.	Western Bulldogs 14.12 (96)	TIO Stadium (crowd: 9,816)	Report; Stats
Saturday, 10 May (7:40 pm)	Port Adelaide 12.12 (84)	def. by	Adelaide 13.11 (89)	Adelaide Oval (crowd: 53,117)	Report; Stats
Sunday, 11 May (1:10 pm)	Richmond 11.15 (81)	def.	West Coast 11.13 (79)	Melbourne Cricket Ground (crowd: 29,539)	Report; Stats
Sunday, 11 May (3:20 pm)	Geelong 14.17 (101)	def. by	Greater Western Sydney 16.9 (105)	GMHBA Stadium (crowd: 28,407)	Report; Stats
Sunday, 11 May (4:40 pm)	North Melbourne 10.11 (71)	drew with	Brisbane Lions 10.11 (71)	Ninja Stadium (crowd: 7,395)	Report; Stats
The crowd of 65,680 for the St Kilda v Carlton match is the largest crowd for a home-and-away match between the two clubs.; The average winning margin during round 9 was 10.33 points, the lowest in a home-and-away round since 1970, with eight of the nine matches decided by 15 points or less.

=== Round 10 ===
	Round 10 (Sir Doug Nicholls Round week 1)
Thursday, 15 May (7:30 pm)	Gold Coast 16.8 (104)	def.	Hawthorn 15.6 (96)	TIO Stadium (crowd: 12,314)	Report; Stats
Friday, 16 May (7:40 pm)	Sydney 11.12 (78)	def.	Carlton 9.8 (62)	Sydney Cricket Ground (crowd: 39,082)	Report; Stats
Saturday, 17 May (1:20 pm)	Collingwood 11.12 (78)	def.	Adelaide 10.8 (68)	Melbourne Cricket Ground (crowd: 67,697)	Report; Stats
Saturday, 17 May (3:45 pm)	Port Adelaide 5.9 (39)	def. by	Geelong 17.13 (115)	Adelaide Oval (crowd: 35,508)	Report; Stats
Saturday, 17 May (4:15 pm)	Greater Western Sydney 8.13 (61)	def. by	Fremantle 13.17 (95)	Engie Stadium (crowd: 8,092)	Report; Stats
Saturday, 17 May (7:35 pm)	Western Bulldogs 18.19 (127)	def.	Essendon 5.6 (36)	Marvel Stadium (crowd: 47,266)	Report; Stats
Sunday, 18 May (1:10 pm)	Richmond 11.8 (74)	def. by	North Melbourne 12.6 (78)	Melbourne Cricket Ground (crowd: 50,406)	Report; Stats
Sunday, 18 May (3:20 pm)	Brisbane Lions 13.10 (88)	def. by	Melbourne 14.15 (99)	The Gabba (crowd: 30,473)	Report; Stats
Sunday, 18 May (2:40 pm)	West Coast 16.12 (108)	def.	St Kilda 12.8 (80)	Optus Stadium (crowd: 42,860)	Report; Stats
Six clubs rebranded themselves with Indigenous names across the two weeks of Sir Doug Nicholls Round: Adelaide (Kuwarna), Fremantle (Walyalup), Melbourne (Narrm), Port Adelaide (Yartapuulti), St Kilda (Euro-Yroke) and West Coast (Waalitj Marawar).; The crowd of 67,697 for the Collingwood v Adelaide match is the largest crowd for a home-and-away match involving Adelaide.; West Coast's win over St Kilda ended an eleven-match losing streak.

=== Round 11 ===
	Round 11 (Sir Doug Nicholls Round week 2)
Thursday, 22 May (7:30 pm)	Geelong 20.7 (127)	def.	Western Bulldogs 16.17 (113)	GMHBA Stadium (crowd: 32,641)	Report; Stats
Friday, 23 May (7:40 pm)	Essendon 11.15 (81)	def.	Richmond 8.10 (58)	Melbourne Cricket Ground (crowd: 76,051)	Report; Stats
Saturday, 24 May (12:35 pm)	Carlton 12.10 (82)	def. by	Greater Western Sydney 17.8 (110)	Marvel Stadium (crowd: 36,468)	Report; Stats
Saturday, 24 May (4:15 pm)	Hawthorn 8.12 (60)	def. by	Brisbane Lions 14.9 (93)	Melbourne Cricket Ground (crowd: 57,919)	Report; Stats
Saturday, 24 May (7:35 pm)	North Melbourne 9.9 (63)	def. by	Collingwood 15.18 (108)	Marvel Stadium (crowd: 40,479)	Report; Stats
Saturday, 24 May (6:10 pm)	Fremantle 15.10 (100)	def.	Port Adelaide 7.9 (51)	Optus Stadium (crowd: 40,466)	Report; Stats
Sunday, 25 May (1:10 pm)	Adelaide 19.14 (128)	def.	West Coast 8.14 (62)	Adelaide Oval (crowd: 39,271)	Report; Stats
Sunday, 25 May (3:20 pm)	Melbourne 19.17 (131)	def.	Sydney 12.6 (78)	Melbourne Cricket Ground (crowd: 38,520)	Report; Stats
Sunday, 25 May (4:40 pm)	St Kilda 8.13 (61)	def. by	Gold Coast 12.8 (80)	Marvel Stadium (crowd: 13,486)	Report; Stats
Six clubs rebranded themselves with Indigenous names across the two weeks of Sir Doug Nicholls Round: Adelaide (Kuwarna), Fremantle (Walyalup), Melbourne (Narrm), Port Adelaide (Yartapuulti), St Kilda (Euro-Yroke) and West Coast (Waalitj Marawar).; The crowd of 57,919 for the Hawthorn v Brisbane Lions match is the largest crowd for a match between the two clubs.; The crowd of 13,486 for the St Kilda v Gold Coast match is the smallest crowd for a St Kilda home match at Marvel Stadium.

=== Round 12 ===
	Round 12
Thursday, 29 May (7:30 pm)	Brisbane Lions 13.12 (90)	def.	Essendon 11.6 (72)	The Gabba (crowd: 26,441)	Report; Stats
Friday, 30 May (7:40 pm)	Collingwood 16.11 (107)	def.	Hawthorn 8.8 (56)	Melbourne Cricket Ground (crowd: 83,706)	Report; Stats
Saturday, 31 May (1:20 pm)	Gold Coast 9.10 (64)	def. by	Fremantle 11.9 (75)	People First Stadium (crowd: 11,750)	Report; Stats
Saturday, 31 May (4:15 pm)	Greater Western Sydney 12.8 (80)	def.	Richmond 10.17 (77)	Engie Stadium (crowd: 9,770)	Report; Stats
Saturday, 31 May (7:35 pm)	Sydney 5.11 (41)	def. by	Adelaide 21.5 (131)	Sydney Cricket Ground (crowd: 35,229)	Report; Stats
Sunday, 1 June (2:50 pm)	Melbourne 7.21 (63)	def. by	St Kilda 14.7 (91)	TIO Traeger Park (crowd: 6,721)	Report; Stats
Sunday, 1 June (5:20 pm)	West Coast 11.7 (73)	def. by	Geelong 17.14 (116)	Optus Stadium (crowd: 42,501)	Report; Stats
	Bye: Carlton; North Melbourne; Port Adelaide; Western Bulldogs

=== Round 13 ===
	Round 13
Thursday, 5 June (7:30 pm)	Western Bulldogs 8.11 (59)	def. by	Hawthorn 12.9 (81)	Marvel Stadium (crowd: 35,725)	Report; Stats
Friday, 6 June (7:10 pm)	Adelaide 10.8 (68)	def.	Brisbane Lions 8.15 (63)	Adelaide Oval (crowd: 42,921)	Report; Stats
Saturday, 7 June (1:20 pm)	Richmond 4.12 (36)	def. by	Sydney 11.14 (80)	Melbourne Cricket Ground (crowd: 41,452)	Report; Stats
Saturday, 7 June (4:15 pm)	Geelong 9.7 (61)	def.	Gold Coast 5.7 (37)	GMHBA Stadium (crowd: 29,502)	Report; Stats
Saturday, 7 June (7:35 pm)	Greater Western Sydney 7.8 (50)	def. by	Port Adelaide 9.12 (66)	Corroboree Group Oval (crowd: 9,005)	Report; Stats
Sunday, 8 June (1:20 pm)	North Melbourne 9.8 (62)	def.	West Coast 6.16 (52)	Hands Oval (crowd: 12,715)	Report; Stats
Sunday, 8 June (7:20 pm)	Carlton 11.12 (78)	def.	Essendon 11.4 (70)	Melbourne Cricket Ground (crowd: 74,280)	Report; Stats
Monday, 9 June (3:20 pm)	Melbourne 10.11 (71)	def. by	Collingwood 11.6 (72)	Melbourne Cricket Ground (crowd: 77,761)	Report; Stats
	Bye: Fremantle; St Kilda

=== Round 14 ===
	Round 14
Thursday, 12 June (7:30 pm)	St Kilda 8.12 (60)	def. by	Western Bulldogs 20.12 (132)	Marvel Stadium (crowd: 20,508)	Report; Stats
Friday, 13 June (7:40 pm)	Hawthorn 6.11 (47)	def.	Adelaide 5.14 (44)	University of Tasmania Stadium (crowd: 15,129)	Report; Stats
Saturday, 14 June (1:20 pm)	Brisbane Lions 13.18 (96)	def. by	Greater Western Sydney 17.5 (107)	The Gabba (crowd: 30,711)	Report; Stats
Saturday, 14 June (4:15 pm)	Essendon 8.8 (56)	def. by	Geelong 23.13 (151)	Melbourne Cricket Ground (crowd: 61,643)	Report; Stats
Saturday, 14 June (5:35 pm)	North Melbourne 10.7 (67)	def. by	Fremantle 10.13 (73)	Optus Stadium (crowd: 31,408)	Report; Stats
Sunday, 15 June (2:50 pm)	Port Adelaide 14.9 (93)	def.	Melbourne 9.14 (68)	Adelaide Oval (crowd: 30,144)	Report; Stats
Sunday, 15 June (4:10 pm)	West Coast 7.10 (52)	def. by	Carlton 12.14 (86)	Optus Stadium (crowd: 43,803)	Report; Stats
	Bye: Collingwood; Gold Coast; Richmond; Sydney

=== Round 15 ===
	Round 15
Thursday, 19 June (6:10 pm)	Fremantle 16.8 (104)	def.	Essendon 9.9 (63)	Optus Stadium (crowd: 37,570)	Report; Stats
Friday, 20 June (7:40 pm)	Geelong 6.15 (51)	def. by	Brisbane Lions 14.8 (92)	GMHBA Stadium (crowd: 35,367)	Report; Stats
Saturday, 21 June (1:20 pm)	Carlton 10.13 (73)	def. by	North Melbourne 13.6 (84)	Melbourne Cricket Ground (crowd: 56,236)	Report; Stats
Saturday, 21 June (3:45 pm)	Port Adelaide 7.10 (52)	def. by	Sydney 9.17 (71)	Adelaide Oval (crowd: 33,576)	Report; Stats
Saturday, 21 June (7:35 pm)	Collingwood 16.12 (108)	def.	St Kilda 11.8 (74)	Marvel Stadium (crowd: 43,039)	Report; Stats
Sunday, 22 June (1:10 pm)	Greater Western Sydney 16.10 (106)	def.	Gold Coast 14.15 (99)	Engie Stadium (crowd: 10,504)	Report; Stats
Sunday, 22 June (3:20 pm)	Western Bulldogs 21.9 (135)	def.	Richmond 8.8 (56)	Marvel Stadium (crowd: 38,280)	Report; Stats
	Bye: Adelaide; Hawthorn; Melbourne; West Coast
The Brisbane Lions' win over Geelong was their first at GMHBA Stadium since 2003, ending a 13-match losing streak at the venue.

=== Round 16 ===
	Round 16
Thursday, 26 June (7:00 pm)	Port Adelaide 16.14 (110)	def.	Carlton 8.12 (60)	Adelaide Oval (crowd: 30,381)	Report; Stats
Friday, 27 June (7:40 pm)	Sydney 14.12 (96)	def. by	Western Bulldogs 16.9 (105)	Sydney Cricket Ground (crowd: 29,246)	Report; Stats
Saturday, 28 June (1:20 pm)	Gold Coast 15.14 (104)	def.	Melbourne 12.13 (85)	People First Stadium (crowd: 13,064)	Report; Stats
Saturday, 28 June (4:15 pm)	Hawthorn 23.12 (150)	def.	North Melbourne 9.11 (65)	University of Tasmania Stadium (crowd: 13,287)	Report; Stats
Saturday, 28 June (7:35 pm)	Collingwood 13.10 (88)	def.	West Coast 8.11 (59)	Marvel Stadium (crowd: 38,126)	Report; Stats
Sunday, 29 June (3:15 pm)	Richmond 8.6 (54)	def. by	Adelaide 18.14 (122)	Melbourne Cricket Ground (crowd: 23,231)	Report; Stats
Sunday, 29 June (3:10 pm)	Fremantle 11.15 (81)	def.	St Kilda 9.15 (69)	Optus Stadium (crowd: 41,600)	Report; Stats
	Bye: Brisbane Lions; Essendon; Geelong; Greater Western Sydney

=== Round 17 ===
	Round 17
Thursday, 3 July (7:30 pm)	North Melbourne 13.7 (85)	def. by	Western Bulldogs 20.14 (134)	Marvel Stadium (crowd: 25,009)	Report; Stats
Friday, 4 July (7:20 pm)	Carlton 8.11 (59)	def. by	Collingwood 17.13 (115)	Melbourne Cricket Ground (crowd: 75,827)	Report; Stats
Friday, 4 July (6:20 pm)	West Coast 8.4 (52)	def. by	Greater Western Sydney 16.15 (111)	Optus Stadium (crowd: 38,152)	Report; Stats
Saturday, 5 July (12:35 pm)	Essendon 11.8 (74)	def. by	Gold Coast 18.7 (115)	Marvel Stadium (crowd: 29,672)	Report; Stats
Saturday, 5 July (4:15 pm)	Geelong 18.16 (124)	def.	Richmond 7.10 (52)	GMHBA Stadium (crowd: 31,060)	Report; Stats
Saturday, 5 July (7:35 pm)	Brisbane Lions 18.12 (120)	def.	Port Adelaide 14.8 (92)	The Gabba (crowd: 30,017)	Report; Stats
Saturday, 5 July (7:40 pm)	St Kilda 10.14 (74)	def. by	Hawthorn 14.10 (94)	Marvel Stadium (crowd: 36,035)	Report; Stats
Sunday, 6 July (1:10 pm)	Sydney 14.10 (94)	def.	Fremantle 12.11 (83)	Sydney Cricket Ground (crowd: 32,007)	Report; Stats
Sunday, 6 July (2:45 pm)	Adelaide 13.12 (90)	def.	Melbourne 11.11 (77)	Adelaide Oval (crowd: 43,306)	Report; Stats

=== Round 18 ===
	Round 18
Thursday, 10 July (7:30 pm)	Carlton 9.12 (66)	def. by	Brisbane Lions 15.13 (103)	Marvel Stadium (crowd: 32,898)	Report; Stats
Friday, 11 July (7:40 pm)	Gold Coast 10.9 (69)	def.	Collingwood 8.15 (63)	People First Stadium (crowd: 22,831)	Report; Stats
Saturday, 12 July (1:20 pm)	Western Bulldogs 15.8 (98)	def. by	Adelaide 16.13 (109)	Marvel Stadium (crowd: 41,198)	Report; Stats
Saturday, 12 July (4:15 pm)	Greater Western Sydney 17.9 (111)	def.	Geelong 13.7 (85)	Engie Stadium (crowd: 13,349)	Report; Stats
Saturday, 12 July (7:35 pm)	Richmond 6.10 (46)	def.	Essendon 4.13 (37)	Melbourne Cricket Ground (crowd: 52,125)	Report; Stats
Saturday, 12 July (6:10 pm)	Fremantle 12.5 (77)	def.	Hawthorn 9.10 (64)	Optus Stadium (crowd: 49,460)	Report; Stats
Sunday, 13 July (1:10 pm)	Melbourne 18.11 (119)	def.	North Melbourne 12.11 (83)	Melbourne Cricket Ground (crowd: 35,844)	Report; Stats
Sunday, 13 July (3:15 pm)	St Kilda 13.9 (87)	def. by	Sydney 14.8 (92)	Marvel Stadium (crowd: 29,589)	Report; Stats
Sunday, 13 July (4:10 pm)	Port Adelaide 12.15 (87)	def.	West Coast 9.7 (61)	Adelaide Oval (crowd: 30,553)	Report; Stats
The Western Bulldogs v Adelaide match was originally scheduled to be played at Mars Stadium, but was moved to Marvel Stadium to allow for increased attendance while the former underwent redevelopment.

=== Round 19 ===
	Round 19
Thursday, 17 July (7:30 pm)	Essendon 7.14 (56)	def. by	Greater Western Sydney 16.8 (104)	Marvel Stadium (crowd: 20,347)	Report; Stats
Friday, 18 July (7:40 pm)	Brisbane Lions 12.14 (86)	def.	Western Bulldogs 12.4 (76)	The Gabba (crowd: 29,039)	Report; Stats
Saturday, 19 July (1:20 pm)	Hawthorn 13.9 (87)	def.	Port Adelaide 7.7 (49)	University of Tasmania Stadium (crowd: 12,772)	Report; Stats
Saturday, 19 July (4:15 pm)	Sydney 12.12 (84)	def.	North Melbourne 7.11 (53)	Sydney Cricket Ground (crowd: 31,909)	Report; Stats
Saturday, 19 July (7:35 pm)	Carlton 12.6 (78)	def.	Melbourne 10.10 (70)	Melbourne Cricket Ground (crowd: 40,869)	Report; Stats
Saturday, 19 July (6:10 pm)	West Coast 8.8 (56)	def. by	Richmond 16.9 (105)	Optus Stadium (crowd: 44,252)	Report; Stats
Sunday, 20 July (1:10 pm)	Geelong 17.11 (113)	def.	St Kilda 12.10 (82)	GMHBA Stadium (crowd: 29,985)	Report; Stats
Sunday, 20 July (3:15 pm)	Collingwood 11.12 (78)	def. by	Fremantle 12.7 (79)	Melbourne Cricket Ground (crowd: 62,198)	Report; Stats
Sunday, 20 July (4:10 pm)	Adelaide 16.11 (107)	def.	Gold Coast 6.10 (46)	Adelaide Oval (crowd: 44,249)	Report; Stats
The crowd of 62,198 for the Collingwood v Fremantle match is the largest crowd for a home-and-away match involving Fremantle.; Gold Coast was held goalless to half-time for the first time in its history in its loss to Adelaide.

=== Round 20 ===
	Round 20
Thursday, 24 July (7:30 pm)	Hawthorn 13.7 (85)	def.	Carlton 9.7 (61)	Melbourne Cricket Ground (crowd: 51,271)	Report; Stats
Friday, 25 July (7:20 pm)	Essendon 7.8 (50)	def. by	Western Bulldogs 22.11 (143)	Marvel Stadium (crowd: 29,367)	Report; Stats
Friday, 25 July (7:50 pm)	Greater Western Sydney 15.12 (102)	def.	Sydney 8.10 (58)	Engie Stadium (crowd: 18,536)	Report; Stats
Saturday, 26 July (1:20 pm)	Gold Coast 20.10 (130)	def.	Brisbane Lions 9.10 (64)	People First Stadium (crowd: 20,833)	Report; Stats
Saturday, 26 July (2:15 pm)	Fremantle 18.18 (126)	def.	West Coast 12.5 (77)	Optus Stadium (crowd: 54,384)	Report; Stats
Saturday, 26 July (7:35 pm)	North Melbourne 7.7 (49)	def. by	Geelong 22.18 (150)	Marvel Stadium (crowd: 25,445)	Report; Stats
Saturday, 26 July (7:40 pm)	Adelaide 20.13 (133)	def.	Port Adelaide 5.5 (35)	Adelaide Oval (crowd: 46,018)	Report; Stats
Sunday, 27 July (2:10 pm)	Richmond 8.9 (57)	def. by	Collingwood 13.15 (93)	Melbourne Cricket Ground (crowd: 59,454)	Report; Stats
Sunday, 27 July (3:15 pm)	St Kilda 15.6 (96)	def.	Melbourne 13.12 (90)	Marvel Stadium (crowd: 22,570)	Report; Stats
Gold Coast's 66-point win over the Brisbane Lions was its biggest win in a QClash.; Adelaide's 98-point win over Port Adelaide was the biggest win by either team in a Showdown.; Port Adelaide's score of 5.5 (35) against Adelaide was its lowest score in a Showdown.; St Kilda trailed Melbourne by 46 points at three-quarter time and went on to win, recording the biggest comeback from a three-quarter time deficit in VFL/AFL history; Nasiah Wanganeen-Milera (St Kilda) kicked the final two goals of the game, the first from a set shot with eight seconds remaining to level scores after taking a spectacular mark inside forward 50, and the second after Melbourne made a 6–6–6 rule infringement at the following centre bounce, with Wanganeen-Milera marking the resultant free kick and kicking the winning goal after the final siren.

=== Round 21 ===
	Round 21
Thursday, 31 July (7:30 pm)	Western Bulldogs 19.18 (132)	def.	Greater Western Sydney 6.8 (44)	Marvel Stadium (crowd: 23,898)	Report; Stats
Friday, 1 August (7:10 pm)	Adelaide 15.11 (101)	def.	Hawthorn 13.9 (87)	Adelaide Oval (crowd: 50,654)	Report; Stats
Saturday, 2 August (1:20 pm)	Melbourne 21.13 (139)	def.	West Coast 8.8 (56)	Marvel Stadium (crowd: 16,394)	Report; Stats
Saturday, 2 August (4:10 pm)	Gold Coast 16.11 (107)	def.	Richmond 2.11 (23)	People First Stadium (crowd: 14,841)	Report; Stats
Saturday, 2 August (4:15 pm)	Sydney 9.14 (68)	def.	Essendon 7.12 (54)	Sydney Cricket Ground (crowd: 20,805)	Report; Stats
Saturday, 2 August (7:35 pm)	Collingwood 10.5 (65)	def. by	Brisbane Lions 14.8 (92)	Melbourne Cricket Ground (crowd: 82,326)	Report; Stats
Sunday, 3 August (1:40 pm)	St Kilda 11.12 (78)	def.	North Melbourne 10.9 (69)	Marvel Stadium (crowd: 31,978)	Report; Stats
Sunday, 3 August (3:15 pm)	Geelong 23.15 (153)	def.	Port Adelaide 9.11 (65)	GMHBA Stadium (crowd: 28,064)	Report; Stats
Sunday, 3 August (3:10 pm)	Fremantle 15.4 (94)	def.	Carlton 10.7 (67)	Optus Stadium (crowd: 39,358)	Report; Stats
Gold Coast's 84-point win was its biggest over Richmond.; Richmond's half-time score of 0.5 (5) was its lowest since 1996.; Richmond's score of 2.11 (23) was the lowest score ever conceded by Gold Coast.; The crowd of 82,326 for the Collingwood v Brisbane Lions match is the largest crowd for a home-and-away match involving the Brisbane Lions.

=== Round 22 ===
	Round 22
Thursday, 7 August (7:30 pm)	Hawthorn 17.8 (110)	def.	Collingwood 6.10 (46)	Melbourne Cricket Ground (crowd: 68,515)	Report; Stats
Friday, 8 August (7:40 pm)	Geelong 15.19 (109)	def.	Essendon 10.5 (65)	GMHBA Stadium (crowd: 30,289)	Report; Stats
Saturday, 9 August (1:20 pm)	Richmond 7.10 (52)	def. by	St Kilda 8.8 (56)	Melbourne Cricket Ground (crowd: 41,395)	Report; Stats
Saturday, 9 August (4:15 pm)	Brisbane Lions 13.12 (90)	def. by	Sydney 13.14 (92)	The Gabba (crowd: 31,424)	Report; Stats
Saturday, 9 August (7:35 pm)	Carlton 11.8 (74)	def. by	Gold Coast 13.15 (93)	Marvel Stadium (crowd: 24,120)	Report; Stats
Saturday, 9 August (7:40 pm)	Port Adelaide 13.8 (86)	def. by	Fremantle 13.14 (92)	Adelaide Oval (crowd: 30,390)	Report; Stats
Sunday, 10 August (1:40 pm)	Greater Western Sydney 20.13 (133)	def.	North Melbourne 12.7 (79)	Corroboree Group Oval (crowd: 11,753)	Report; Stats
Sunday, 10 August (3:15 pm)	Melbourne 15.9 (99)	def. by	Western Bulldogs 15.15 (105)	Melbourne Cricket Ground (crowd: 34,733)	Report; Stats
Sunday, 10 August (3:10 pm)	West Coast 12.6 (78)	def. by	Adelaide 13.9 (87)	Optus Stadium (crowd: 32,845)	Report; Stats
Collingwood fielded the oldest team in VFL/AFL history in its match against Hawthorn, with an average age of 29 years and 267 days.

=== Round 23 ===
	Round 23
Friday, 15 August (7:20 pm)	Essendon 11.9 (75)	def. by	St Kilda 11.11 (77)	Marvel Stadium (crowd: 31,107)	Report; Stats
Friday, 15 August (6:20 pm)	Fremantle 5.14 (44)	def. by	Brisbane Lions 15.11 (101)	Optus Stadium (crowd: 54,302)	Report; Stats
Saturday, 16 August (12:35 pm)	Gold Coast 11.10 (76)	def. by	Greater Western Sydney 17.9 (111)	People First Stadium (crowd: 16,007)	Report; Stats
Saturday, 16 August (1:20 pm)	Carlton 18.10 (118)	def.	Port Adelaide 9.10 (64)	Marvel Stadium (crowd: 25,020)	Report; Stats
Saturday, 16 August (4:15 pm)	Hawthorn 13.14 (92)	def.	Melbourne 8.8 (56)	Melbourne Cricket Ground (crowd: 53,871)	Report; Stats
Saturday, 16 August (7:05 pm)	Adelaide 9.5 (59)	def.	Collingwood 8.8 (56)	Adelaide Oval (crowd: 54,283)	Report; Stats
Sunday, 17 August (1:10 pm)	North Melbourne 20.15 (135)	def.	Richmond 13.9 (87)	Ninja Stadium (crowd: 11,176)	Report; Stats
Sunday, 17 August (3:15 pm)	Sydney 10.8 (68)	def. by	Geelong 16.15 (111)	Sydney Cricket Ground (crowd: 37,656)	Report; Stats
Sunday, 17 August (4:40 pm)	Western Bulldogs 19.12 (126)	def.	West Coast 4.8 (32)	Marvel Stadium (crowd: 21,207)	Report; Stats
The crowd of 54,283 for the Adelaide v Collingwood match was the largest crowd for an AFL match at Adelaide Oval.; Adelaide's win over Collingwood was its first since 2016, ending a ten-match losing streak and eleven-match winless streak.

=== Round 24 ===
	Round 24
Thursday, 21 August (7:30 pm)	Essendon 8.8 (56)	def. by	Carlton 13.12 (90)	Melbourne Cricket Ground (crowd: 41,150)	Report; Stats
Friday, 22 August (7:10 pm)	Collingwood 11.16 (82)	def.	Melbourne 11.10 (76)	Melbourne Cricket Ground (crowd: 60,611)	Report; Stats
Friday, 22 August (7:40 pm)	Port Adelaide 10.11 (71)	def.	Gold Coast 9.13 (67)	Adelaide Oval (crowd: 40,897)	Report; Stats
Saturday, 23 August (1:20 pm)	North Melbourne 15.10 (100)	def. by	Adelaide 17.11 (113)	Marvel Stadium (crowd: 17,494)	Report; Stats
Saturday, 23 August (4:15 pm)	Richmond 9.10 (64)	def. by	Geelong 14.19 (103)	Melbourne Cricket Ground (crowd: 46,109)	Report; Stats
Saturday, 23 August (5:35 pm)	West Coast 7.9 (51)	def. by	Sydney 18.10 (118)	Optus Stadium (crowd: 36,029)	Report; Stats
Sunday, 24 August (12:20 pm)	Greater Western Sydney 15.14 (104)	def.	St Kilda 14.9 (93)	Engie Stadium (crowd: 10,563)	Report; Stats
Sunday, 24 August (3:15 pm)	Western Bulldogs 14.13 (97)	def. by	Fremantle 17.10 (112)	Marvel Stadium (crowd: 44,069)	Report; Stats
Sunday, 24 August (7:20 pm)	Brisbane Lions 11.23 (89)	def.	Hawthorn 11.13 (79)	The Gabba (crowd: 32,086)	Report; Stats
Wednesday, 27 August (7:20 pm)	Gold Coast 23.15 (153)	def.	Essendon 8.10 (58)	People First Stadium (crowd: 16,768)	Report; Stats
Boundary umpires Greta Miller and Melissa Sambrooks became the first female boundary umpires to officiate an AFL match during the Essendon v Carlton match.; Gold Coast's 95-point win over Essendon was the biggest in its history.

== Ladder ==
Pos	Team	Pld	W	L	D	PF	PA	PP	Pts	Qualification
1	Adelaide	23	18	5	0	2278	1635	139.3	72	Finals series
2	Geelong	23	17	6	0	2425	1714	141.5	68	Finals series
3	Brisbane Lions (P)	23	16	6	1	2061	1804	114.2	66	Finals series
4	Collingwood	23	16	7	0	1991	1627	122.4	64	Finals series
5	Greater Western Sydney	23	16	7	0	2114	1834	115.3	64	Finals series
6	Fremantle	23	16	7	0	1978	1815	109.0	64	Finals series
7	Gold Coast	23	15	8	0	2173	1740	124.9	60	Finals series
8	Hawthorn	23	15	8	0	2045	1691	120.9	60	Finals series
9	Western Bulldogs	23	14	9	0	2493	1820	137.0	56	
10	Sydney	23	12	11	0	1845	1902	97.0	48	
11	Carlton	23	9	14	0	1799	1861	96.7	36	
12	St Kilda	23	9	14	0	1839	2077	88.5	36	
13	Port Adelaide	23	9	14	0	1705	2136	79.8	36	
14	Melbourne	23	7	16	0	1902	2038	93.3	28	
15	Essendon	23	6	17	0	1535	2209	69.5	24	
16	North Melbourne	23	5	17	1	1805	2365	76.3	22	
17	Richmond	23	5	18	0	1449	2197	66.0	20	
18	West Coast	23	1	22	0	1466	2438	60.1	4	

Source: afl.com.au
Rules for classification: 1) points; 2) percentage; 3) number of points for
(P) Premiers

== Progression by round ==
4	Finished the round in first place	0	Finished the round in last place
4	Won the minor premiership	0	Finished the season in last place
4	Finished the round inside the top eight		
4_{1}	Subscript indicates the ladder position at the end of the round		
4_{1}	Underlined points indicate the team had a bye that round		

Team	O	1	2	3	4	5	6	7	8	9	10	11	12	13	14	15	16	17	18	19	20	21	22	23	24	
Adelaide	0	4_{5}	8_{2}	12_{2}	12_{5}	12_{7}	16_{5}	16_{5}	20_{5}	24_{5}	24_{6}	28_{4}	32_{3}	36_{3}	36_{4}	36_{4}	40_{3}	44_{3}	48_{3}	52_{3}	56_{2}	60_{1}	64_{1}	68_{1}	72_{1}	
Geelong	0	4_{4}	4_{7}	4_{9}	8_{8}	12_{6}	16_{6}	16_{7}	20_{7}	20_{7}	24_{7}	28_{5}	32_{5}	36_{4}	40_{2}	40_{3}	40_{4}	44_{4}	44_{4}	48_{4}	52_{4}	56_{4}	60_{2}	64_{2}	68_{2}	
Brisbane Lions	0	4_{9}	8_{5}	12_{3}	16_{2}	20_{1}	20_{2}	24_{2}	28_{1}	30_{1}	30_{2}	34_{2}	38_{2}	38_{2}	38_{3}	42_{2}	42_{2}	46_{2}	50_{2}	54_{2}	54_{3}	58_{3}	58_{5}	62_{3}	66_{3}	
Collingwood	0_{4}	4_{6}	8_{4}	8_{6}	12_{6}	16_{4}	20_{1}	24_{1}	24_{2}	28_{2}	32_{1}	36_{1}	40_{1}	44_{1}	44_{1}	48_{1}	52_{1}	56_{1}	56_{1}	56_{1}	60_{1}	60_{2}	60_{3}	60_{4}	64_{4}	
Greater Western Sydney	4_{1}	8_{1}	8_{3}	8_{5}	12_{4}	16_{3}	16_{4}	16_{6}	16_{8}	20_{8}	20_{8}	24_{8}	28_{7}	28_{7}	32_{7}	36_{7}	36_{9}	40_{8}	44_{7}	48_{6}	52_{6}	52_{8}	56_{8}	60_{6}	64_{5}	
Fremantle	0	0_{16}	0_{17}	4_{13}	8_{11}	12_{8}	12_{9}	16_{9}	16_{9}	16_{11}	20_{9}	24_{9}	28_{8}	28_{8}	32_{8}	36_{6}	40_{6}	40_{9}	44_{8}	48_{7}	52_{7}	56_{5}	60_{4}	60_{7}	64_{6}	
Gold Coast	0	4_{3}	4_{6}	8_{4}	12_{3}	16_{2}	16_{3}	20_{3}	20_{4}	24_{4}	28_{3}	32_{3}	32_{4}	32_{5}	32_{6}	32_{9}	36_{8}	40_{7}	44_{5}	44_{8}	48_{8}	52_{6}	56_{6}	56_{9}	56	60_{7}
Hawthorn	4_{2}	8_{2}	12_{1}	16_{1}	16_{1}	16_{5}	16_{7}	20_{4}	24_{3}	28_{3}	28_{4}	28_{6}	28_{6}	32_{6}	36_{5}	36_{5}	40_{5}	44_{5}	44_{6}	48_{5}	52_{5}	52_{7}	56_{7}	60_{5}	60_{8}	
Western Bulldogs	0	4_{8}	4_{9}	8_{8}	8_{10}	8_{12}	12_{8}	16_{8}	20_{6}	20_{6}	24_{5}	24_{7}	24_{9}	24_{9}	28_{9}	32_{8}	36_{7}	40_{6}	40_{9}	40_{9}	44_{9}	48_{9}	52_{9}	56_{8}	56_{9}	
Sydney	0_{3}	0_{11}	4_{10}	4_{11}	8_{9}	8_{10}	8_{14}	8_{14}	12_{14}	12_{14}	16_{12}	16_{13}	16_{14}	20_{13}	20_{13}	24_{11}	24_{12}	28_{10}	32_{10}	36_{10}	36_{10}	40_{10}	44_{10}	44_{10}	48_{10}	
Carlton	0	0_{13}	0_{14}	0_{16}	0_{16}	4_{14}	8_{13}	12_{11}	12_{13}	16_{10}	16_{11}	16_{12}	16_{13}	20_{11}	24_{10}	24_{10}	24_{11}	24_{12}	24_{12}	28_{12}	28_{12}	28_{13}	28_{14}	32_{12}	36_{11}	
St Kilda	0	0_{15}	4_{12}	8_{7}	12_{7}	12_{9}	12_{12}	12_{13}	16_{10}	16_{12}	16_{13}	16_{14}	20_{11}	20_{12}	20_{14}	20_{15}	20_{15}	20_{15}	20_{15}	20_{15}	24_{14}	28_{14}	32_{11}	36_{11}	36_{12}	
Port Adelaide	0	0_{18}	4_{11}	4_{12}	4_{12}	8_{11}	12_{10}	16_{10}	16_{12}	16_{13}	16_{15}	16_{15}	16_{15}	20_{15}	24_{11}	24_{12}	28_{10}	28_{11}	32_{11}	32_{11}	32_{11}	32_{11}	32_{12}	32_{13}	36_{13}	
Melbourne	0	0_{10}	0_{15}	0_{17}	0_{17}	0_{17}	4_{17}	8_{15}	12_{15}	12_{15}	16_{14}	20_{11}	20_{12}	20_{14}	20_{15}	20_{14}	20_{14}	20_{14}	24_{13}	24_{13}	24_{13}	28_{12}	28_{13}	28_{14}	28_{14}	
Essendon	0	0_{14}	0_{16}	4_{14}	4_{14}	8_{13}	12_{11}	12_{12}	16_{11}	20_{9}	20_{10}	24_{10}	24_{10}	24_{10}	24_{12}	24_{13}	24_{13}	24_{13}	24_{14}	24_{14}	24_{15}	24_{15}	24_{15}	24_{15}	24	24_{15}
North Melbourne	0	0_{12}	4_{8}	4_{10}	4_{13}	4_{15}	4_{16}	4_{17}	4_{17}	6_{17}	10_{17}	10_{17}	10_{17}	14_{16}	14_{16}	18_{16}	18_{16}	18_{16}	18_{16}	18_{17}	18_{17}	18_{17}	18_{17}	22_{16}	22_{16}	
Richmond	0	4_{7}	4_{13}	4_{15}	4_{15}	4_{16}	8_{15}	8_{16}	8_{16}	12_{16}	12_{16}	12_{16}	12_{16}	12_{17}	12_{17}	12_{17}	12_{17}	12_{17}	16_{17}	20_{16}	20_{16}	20_{16}	20_{16}	20_{17}	20_{17}	
West Coast	0	0_{17}	0_{18}	0_{18}	0_{18}	0_{18}	0_{18}	0_{18}	0_{18}	0_{18}	4_{18}	4_{18}	4_{18}	4_{18}	4_{18}	4_{18}	4_{18}	4_{18}	4_{18}	4_{18}	4_{18}	4_{18}	4_{18}	4_{18}	4_{18}	

Source: AFL Tables

== Home matches and membership ==
The following table includes all home match attendance figures from the home-and-away season, excluding neutral matches (Gather Round).

Team	Home match attendance							Membership		
Team	Hosted	Total	Highest	Lowest	Average			2024	2025	Change
Team	Hosted	Total	Highest	Lowest	2024	2025	Change	2024	2025	Change
Adelaide	11	496,317	54,283	39,271	40,821	45,120	▲4,299	75,477	81,067	▲5,590
Brisbane Lions	11	336,583	34,802	26,441	30,864	30,598	▼266	63,268	75,115	▲11,847
Carlton	11	541,005	75,827	24,120	58,311	49,182	▼9,129	106,345	100,743	▼5,602
Collingwood	11	757,601	92,044	38,126	66,880	68,873	▲1,993	110,628	112,491	▲1,863
Essendon	11	440,377	76,051	20,347	50,478	40,034	▼10,444	83,664	85,568	▲1,904
Fremantle	11	503,341	54,384	37,570	46,891	45,758	▼1,133	62,237	66,179	▲3,942
Geelong	11	389,830	88,746	25,372	36,291	35,439	▼852	90,798	92,379	▲1,581
Gold Coast	11	172,469	22,831	9,816	15,584	15,679	▲95	26,157	30,107	▲3,950
Greater Western Sydney	11	132,285	19,248	8,092	12,275	12,026	▼249	36,629	37,705	▲1,076
Hawthorn	11	456,326	80,735	13,287	36,037	41,484	▲5,447	83,823	87,204	▲3,381
Melbourne	11	404,855	77,761	6,721	34,929	36,805	▲1,876	65,479	58,563	▼6,916
North Melbourne	11	277,921	46,373	7,395	21,954	25,266	▲3,312	50,628	56,283	▲5,655
Port Adelaide	11	391,113	53,117	30,390	36,922	35,556	▼1,366	66,015	72,656	▲6,641
Richmond	11	488,375	80,009	18,423	47,582	44,398	▼3,184	98,489	92,531	▼5,958
St Kilda	11	348,079	65,680	13,486	29,257	31,644	▲2,387	60,467	65,509	▲5,042
Sydney	11	377,046	40,310	20,805	38,202	34,277	▼3,925	73,757	76,674	▲2,917
West Coast	11	468,334	53,289	32,845	46,234	42,576	▼3,658	103,498	107,079	▲3,581
Western Bulldogs	11	404,401	78,027	4,814	28,523	36,764	▲8,241	62,328	65,584	▲3,256
Total/overall	198	7,386,584	92,044	4,814	37,815	37,306	▼509	1,319,687	1,363,437	▲43,750

Source: AFL Tables

== Finals series ==
Qualifying and elimination finals
4 September, Adelaide Oval
1	Adelaide	8.7 (55)
4	Collingwood	11.13 (79)
6 September, Engie Stadium
5	Greater Western Sydney	13.10 (88)
8	Hawthorn	16.11 (107)
6 September, Optus Stadium
6	Fremantle	12.7 (79)
7	Gold Coast	11.14 (80)
5 September, Melbourne Cricket Ground
2	Geelong	16.16 (112)
3	Brisbane Lions	11.8 (74)

Semi-finals
12 September, Adelaide Oval
Adelaide	10.7 (67)
Hawthorn	14.17 (101)
13 September, the Gabba
Brisbane Lions	14.16 (100)
Gold Coast	6.11 (47)

Preliminary finals
20 September, Melbourne Cricket Ground
Collingwood	11.5 (71)
Brisbane Lions	15.10 (100)
19 September, Melbourne Cricket Ground
Geelong	17.13 (115)
Hawthorn	13.7 (85)

Grand final
27 September, Melbourne Cricket Ground
Geelong	11.9 (75)
Brisbane Lions	18.14 (122)

All starting times are local time. Source: afl.com.au

=== Finals week 1 ===
First qualifying final
Thursday, 4 September (7:10 pm)	Adelaide 8.7 (55)	def. by	Collingwood 11.13 (79)	Adelaide Oval (crowd: 52,187)	Report; Stats
2.1 (13); 5.1 (31); 8.4 (52); 8.7 (55)	Q1; Q2; Q3; Q4	2.3 (15); 5.7 (37); 10.11 (71); 11.13 (79)
Pedlar 3, Thilthorpe 2, Walker 2, Dawson	Goals	Elliott 4, Sidebottom 3, Cameron, N. Daicos, De Goey, Lipinski
Thilthorpe, Neal-Bullen, Pedlar, Walker, Worrell	Best	Moore, Elliott, N. Daicos, De Goey, Sidebottom, Cameron, Frampton

Second qualifying final
Friday, 5 September (7:40 pm)	Geelong 16.16 (112)	def.	Brisbane Lions 11.8 (74)	Melbourne Cricket Ground (crowd: 86,364)	Report; Stats
4.6 (30); 8.11 (59); 13.12 (90); 16.16 (112)	Q1; Q2; Q3; Q4	3.0 (18); 7.2 (44); 9.5 (59); 11.8 (74)
Dempsey 3, J. Cameron 2, Atkins, Blicavs, Bowes, Close, De Koning, Holmes, Martin, Mullin, S. Neale, Smith, Stewart	Goals	Rayner 3, Lohmann 2, Bailey, Berry, C. Cameron, Dunkley, Fletcher, Morris
Dempsey, Holmes, Blicavs, J. Cameron, Stewart, Bowes, Miers	Best	Dunkley, W. Ashcroft, L. Neale, Zorko, Rayner
Geelong had 13 individual goalkickers in its qualifying final win over the Brisbane Lions, an equal VFL/AFL finals record.

First elimination final
Saturday, 6 September (3:15 pm)	Greater Western Sydney 13.10 (88)	def. by	Hawthorn 16.11 (107)	Engie Stadium (crowd: 20,634)	Report; Stats
3.2 (20); 6.5 (41); 12.7 (79); 13.10 (88)	Q1; Q2; Q3; Q4	7.2 (44); 11.3 (69); 13.7 (85); 16.11 (107)
Hogan 3, Bedford 2, Kelly 2, Briggs, Callaghan, Jones, O'Halloran, Riccardi, Thomas	Goals	Ginnivan 3, Gunston 3, C. Macdonald 3, Chol 2, Amon, Butler, Dear, Newcombe, Watson
Callaghan, Green, Kelly, Whitfield, Hogan, Briggs	Best	Newcombe, Impey, Meek, Weddle, Ginnivan, C. Macdonald, Barrass

Second elimination final
Saturday, 6 September (5:35 pm)	Fremantle 12.7 (79)	def. by	Gold Coast 11.14 (80)	Optus Stadium (crowd: 57,507)	Report; Stats
1.2 (8); 5.2 (32); 8.4 (52); 12.7 (79)	Q1; Q2; Q3; Q4	1.6 (12); 8.9 (57); 9.13 (67); 11.14 (80)
Voss 3, Dudley 2, Treacy 2, Amiss, Bolton, Erasmus, Jackson, Reid	Goals	Humphrey 3, Budarick 2, Long 2, Andrew, Davies, Farrar, Fiorini
Serong, Brayshaw, Ryan, Young, Pearce, Reid	Best	Anderson, Rowell, Witts, Andrew, Uwland, Humphrey
The crowd of 57,507 for the Fremantle v Gold Coast elimination final is the largest crowd for a match involving Gold Coast.

=== Finals week 2 ===
First semi-final
Friday, 12 September (7:10 pm)	Adelaide 10.7 (67)	def. by	Hawthorn 14.17 (101)	Adelaide Oval (crowd: 52,005)	Report; Stats
3.2 (20); 3.6 (24); 7.7 (49); 10.7 (67)	Q1; Q2; Q3; Q4	4.4 (28); 6.7 (43); 11.13 (79); 14.17 (101)
Thilthorpe 3, Rachele 2, Fogarty, Keays, Peatling, Pedlar, Soligo	Goals	Gunston 5, Butler 2, Watson 2, Amon, C. Macdonald, Moore, Newcombe, Weddle
Worrell, Dawson, Laird, Thilthorpe, Milera	Best	Newcombe, Gunston, Sicily, Ward, Worpel
Hawthorn's win over Adelaide was the first win by an eighth-placed team against the minor premier in a final in AFL history.

Second semi-final
Saturday, 13 September (7:35 pm)	Brisbane Lions 14.16 (100)	def.	Gold Coast 6.11 (47)	The Gabba (crowd: 36,628)	Report; Stats
3.5 (23); 9.6 (60); 12.10 (82); 14.16 (100)	Q1; Q2; Q3; Q4	3.4 (22); 5.5 (35); 5.9 (39); 6.11 (47)
Bailey 3, Lohmann 3, W. Ashcroft 2, Morris 2, Ah Chee, Berry, Gallop, Rayner	Goals	King 2, Ainsworth, Anderson, Flanders, Rowell
W. Ashcroft, Dunkley, McCluggage, Rayner, Andrews, Bailey, Berry, Wilmot	Best	Collins, Rowell, Witts, Miller, Anderson
The crowd of 36,628 for the Brisbane Lions v Gold Coast semi-final is the largest crowd for a match between the two clubs.

=== Finals week 3 ===
Second preliminary final
Friday, 19 September (7:40 pm)	Geelong 17.13 (115)	def.	Hawthorn 13.7 (85)	Melbourne Cricket Ground (crowd: 99,567)	Report; Stats
1.3 (9); 6.7 (43); 13.11 (89); 17.13 (115)	Q1; Q2; Q3; Q4	3.4 (22); 6.6 (42); 9.7 (61); 13.7 (85)
Cameron 3, Dangerfield 3, Stengle 3, Mannagh 2, Blicavs, Holmes, Martin, Miers, Neale, Smith	Goals	Gunston 3, Lewis 3, Chol, Ginnivan, Impey, C. Macdonald, Moore, Nash, Watson
Dangerfield, Smith, Atkins, Holmes, Miers, Z. Guthrie	Best	Amon, Gunston, Nash, Chol, Sicily
The crowd of 99,567 for the Geelong v Hawthorn preliminary final was the largest crowd for a VFL/AFL match outside of a grand final since 1971.

First preliminary final
Saturday, 20 September (5:15 pm)	Collingwood 11.5 (71)	def. by	Brisbane Lions 15.10 (100)	Melbourne Cricket Ground (crowd: 96,023)	Report; Stats
1.1 (7); 7.1 (43); 9.4 (58); 11.5 (71)	Q1; Q2; Q3; Q4	4.3 (27); 4.6 (30); 11.9 (75); 15.10 (100)
Elliott 4, Cox 2, Membrey 2, Houston, Lipinski, Schultz	Goals	Gallop 3, W. Ashcroft 2, Bailey 2, Rayner 2, C. Cameron, Dunkley, Lohmann, McCluggage, Morris, Zorko
N. Daicos, J. Daicos, Elliott, Sidebottom, Cox	Best	McCluggage, Bailey, Wilmot, W. Ashcroft, Zorko
Collingwood fielded the oldest finals team in VFL/AFL history in the preliminary final against the Brisbane Lions, with an average age of 28 years and 292 days.

=== Grand final ===
Grand final
Saturday, 27 September (2:30 pm)	Geelong 11.9 (75)	def. by	Brisbane Lions 18.14 (122)	Melbourne Cricket Ground (crowd: 100,022)	Report; Stats
2.3 (15); 5.6 (36); 6.8 (44); 11.9 (75)	Q1; Q2; Q3; Q4	1.6 (12); 5.6 (36); 9.9 (63); 18.14 (122)	Norm Smith Medal: Will Ashcroft; Field umpires: Simon Meredith, Hayden Meyer, Jacob Mollison, Andrew Stephens; National anthem: Vera Blue
Dempsey 4, Blicavs, Bowes, Close, Holmes, Mannagh, Mullin, S. Neale	Goals	C. Cameron 4, McCluggage 4, Bailey 3, Lohmann 2, L. Ashcroft, W. Ashcroft, Morris, L. Neale, Rayner
Dempsey, Holmes, Humphries, Atkins, Smith	Best	McCluggage, Andrews, Bailey, C. Cameron, W. Ashcroft, Gardiner

== Win–loss table ==
The following table can be sorted from biggest winning margin to biggest losing margin for each round. If multiple matches in a round are decided by the same margin, these margins are sorted by percentage (i.e. the lowest-scoring winning team is ranked highest and the lowest-scoring losing team is ranked lowest). Home matches are in bold, neutral matches (Gather Round) are underlined, postponed matches are italicised and opponents are listed above the margins.

+	Win		Qualified for finals
−	Loss		Eliminated
	Draw	X	Bye

Team	Home-and-away season																										Ladder	Finals series			
Team	O	1	2	3	4	5	6	7	8	9	10	11	12	13	14	15	16	17	18	19	20	21	22	23	24		Ladder	F1	F2	F3	GF
Adelaide	X	**STK** **+63**	ESS +61	**NM** **+36**	GC −1	GEE −19	**GWS** **+18**	FRE −18	**CAR** **+60**	PA +5	COL −10	**WC** **+66**	SYD +90	**BL** **+5**	HAW −3	X	RIC +68	**MEL** **+13**	WB +11	**GC** **+61**	**PA** **+98**	**HAW** **+14**	WC +9	**COL** **+3**	NM +13		1 (18–5–0)	**COL** **−24**	**HAW** **−34**		
Brisbane Lions	**GEE**	SYD +4	**WC** **+19**	**GEE (Note: Rescheduled from Opening Round; originally had a bye during this round)** **+9**	RIC +28	WB +21	**COL** **−52**	STK +45	**GC** **+17**	NM; 0	**MEL** **−11**	HAW +33	**ESS** **+18**	ADE −5	**GWS** **−11**	GEE +41	X	**PA** **+28**	CAR +37	**WB** **+10**	GC −66	COL +27	**SYD** **−2**	FRE +57	**HAW** **+10**		3 (16–6–1)	GEE −38	**GC** **+53**	COL +29	GEE +47
Carlton	X	RIC −13	**HAW** **−20**	**WB** **−8**	COL −17	WC +71	NM +82	**GEE** **+18**	ADE −60	STK +15	SYD −16	**GWS** **−28**	X	**ESS** **+8**	WC +34	**NM** **−11**	PA −50	**COL** **−56**	**BL** **−37**	**MEL** **+8**	HAW −24	FRE −27	**GC** **−19**	**PA** **+54**	ESS +34		11 (9–14–0)				
Collingwood	GWS −52	**PA** **+91**	WB +6	X	**CAR** **+17**	SYD +31	BL +52	**ESS** **+41**	**GEE** **−3**	FRE +14	**ADE** **+10**	NM +45	**HAW** **+51**	MEL +1	X	**STK** **+34**	**WC** **+29**	CAR +56	GC −6	**FRE** **−1**	RIC +36	**BL** **−27**	HAW −64	ADE −3	**MEL** **+6**		4 (16–7–0)	ADE +24	X	**BL** **−29**	
Essendon	GC	HAW −26	**ADE** **−61**	**PA** **+12**	X	MEL +39	WC +2	COL −41	**NM** **+3**	**SYD** **+8**	WB −91	**RIC** **+23**	BL −18	CAR −8	**GEE** **−95**	FRE −41	X	**GC** **−41**	RIC −9	**GWS** **−48**	**WB** **−93**	SYD −14	GEE −44	**STK** **−2**	**CAR** **−34**	GC (Note: Rescheduled from Opening Round) −95	15 (6–17–0)				
Fremantle	X	GEE −78	**SYD** **−3**	WC +38	**WB** **+16**	RIC +61	MEL −10	**ADE** **+18**	STK −61	**COL** **−14**	GWS +34	**PA** **+49**	GC +11	X	NM +6	**ESS** **+41**	**STK** **+12**	SYD −11	**HAW** **+13**	COL +1	**WC** **+49**	**CAR** **+27**	PA +6	**BL** **−57**	WB +15		6 (16–7–0)	**GC** **−1**			
Geelong	BL	**FRE** **+78**	STK −7	BL −9	**MEL** **+39**	ADE +19	**HAW** **+7**	CAR −18	COL +3	**GWS** **−4**	PA +76	**WB** **+14**	WC +43	**GC** **+24**	ESS +95	**BL** **−41**	X	**RIC** **+72**	GWS −26	**STK** **+31**	NM +101	**PA** **+88**	**ESS** **+44**	SYD +43	RIC +39		2 (17–6–0)	**BL** **+38**	X	**HAW** **+30**	**BL** **−47**
Gold Coast	**ESS**	WC +87	X	MEL +58	**ADE** **+1**	NM +52	RIC −11	**SYD** **+38**	BL −17	**WB** **+10**	**HAW** **+8**	STK +19	**FRE** **−11**	GEE −24	X	GWS −7	**MEL** **+19**	ESS +41	**COL** **+6**	ADE −61	**BL** **+66**	**RIC** **+84**	CAR +19	**GWS** **−35**	PA −4	**ESS** **+95**	7 (15–8–0)	FRE +1	BL −53		
Greater Western Sydney	**COL** **+52**	MEL +3	X	HAW −12	**WC** **+81**	STK +28	ADE −18	**WB** **−32**	SYD −14	GEE +4	**FRE** **−34**	CAR +28	**RIC** **+3**	**PA** **−16**	BL +11	**GC** **+7**	X	WC +59	**GEE** **+26**	ESS +48	**SYD** **+44**	WB −88	**NM** **+54**	GC +35	**STK** **+11**		5 (16–7–0)	**HAW** **−19**			
Hawthorn	SYD +20	**ESS** **+26**	CAR +20	**GWS** **+12**	X	PA −30	GEE −7	**WC** **+50**	**RIC** **+65**	MEL +35	GC −8	**BL** **−33**	COL −51	WB +22	**ADE** **+3**	X	**NM** **+85**	STK +20	FRE −13	**PA** **+38**	**CAR** **+24**	ADE −14	**COL** **+64**	**MEL** **+36**	BL −10		8 (15–8–0)	GWS +19	ADE +34	GEE −30	
Melbourne	X	**GWS** **−3**	NM −59	**GC** **−58**	GEE −39	ESS −39	**FRE** **+10**	**RIC** **+20**	WC +32	**HAW** **−35**	BL +11	**SYD** **+53**	**STK** **−28**	**COL** **−1**	PA −25	X	GC −19	ADE −13	**NM** **+36**	CAR −8	STK −6	**WC** **+83**	**WB** **−6**	HAW −36	COL −6		14 (7–16–0)				
North Melbourne	X	WB −16	**MEL** **+59**	ADE −36	**SYD** **−65**	GC −52	**CAR** **−82**	PA −9	ESS −3	**BL**; **0**	RIC +4	**COL** **−45**	X	**WC** **+10**	**FRE** **−6**	CAR +11	HAW −85	**WB** **−49**	MEL −36	SYD −31	**GEE** **−101**	STK −9	GWS −54	**RIC** **+48**	**ADE** **−13**		16 (5–17–1)				
Port Adelaide	X	COL −91	**RIC** **+72**	ESS −12	**STK** **−17**	HAW +30	SYD +8	**NM** **+9**	WB −90	**ADE** **−5**	**GEE** **−76**	FRE −49	X	GWS +16	**MEL** **+25**	**SYD** **−19**	**CAR** **+50**	BL −28	**WC** **+26**	HAW −38	ADE −98	GEE −88	**FRE** **−6**	CAR −54	**GC** **+4**		13 (9–14–0)				
Richmond	X	**CAR** **+13**	PA −72	STK −82	**BL** **−28**	FRE −61	**GC** **+11**	MEL −20	HAW −65	**WC** **+2**	**NM** **−4**	ESS −23	GWS −3	**SYD** **−44**	X	WB −79	**ADE** **−68**	GEE −72	**ESS** **+9**	WC +49	**COL** **−36**	GC −84	**STK** **−4**	NM −48	**GEE** **−39**		17 (5–18–0)				
St Kilda	X	ADE −63	**GEE** **+7**	**RIC** **+82**	PA +17	GWS −28	WB −71	**BL** **−45**	**FRE** **+61**	**CAR** **−15**	WC −28	**GC** **−19**	MEL +28	X	**WB** **−72**	COL −34	FRE −12	**HAW** **−20**	**SYD** **−5**	GEE −31	**MEL** **+6**	**NM** **+9**	RIC +4	ESS +2	GWS −11		12 (9–14–0)				
Sydney	**HAW** **−20**	**BL** **−4**	FRE +3	X	NM +65	COL −31	**PA** **−8**	GC −38	**GWS** **+14**	ESS −8	**CAR** **+16**	MEL −53	**ADE** **−90**	RIC +44	X	PA +19	**WB** **−9**	**FRE** **+11**	STK +5	**NM** **+31**	GWS −44	**ESS** **+14**	BL +2	**GEE** **−43**	WC +67		10 (12–11–0)				
West Coast	X	**GC** **−87**	BL −19	**FRE** **−38**	GWS −81	CAR −71	**ESS** **−2**	HAW −50	**MEL** **−32**	RIC −2	**STK** **+28**	ADE −66	**GEE** **−43**	NM −10	**CAR** **−34**	X	COL −29	**GWS** **−59**	PA −26	**RIC** **−49**	FRE −49	MEL −83	**ADE** **−9**	WB −94	**SYD** **−67**		18 (1–22–0)				
Western Bulldogs	X	**NM** **+16**	**COL** **−6**	CAR +8	FRE −16	BL −21	**STK** **+71**	GWS +32	**PA** **+90**	GC −10	**ESS** **+91**	GEE −14	X	**HAW** **−22**	STK +72	**RIC** **+79**	SYD +9	NM +49	**ADE** **−11**	BL −10	ESS +93	**GWS** **+88**	MEL +6	**WC** **+94**	**FRE** **−15**		9 (14–9–0)				

Source: AFL Tables

== Season notes ==
- The Brisbane Lions recorded their longest unbeaten start to a season, winning their first five matches.
- Gold Coast recorded its longest unbeaten start to a season, winning its first four matches.
- West Coast recorded its longest winless start to a season, losing its first nine matches, and only won one match for the season, the fewest in a season in the club's history and the fewest in a season by any club since Greater Western Sydney won one match in 2013.
- Essendon fielded 15 debutants during the season, breaking the AFL era record (excluding expansion teams) of 13 set by Fitzroy in 1991.
- Adelaide won 18 matches during the home-and-away season, the most in the club's history, to win the minor premiership; however, the club lost both of its finals, becoming the first minor premier in the AFL era to do so, and the first since North Melbourne in 1983.
- Gold Coast won 15 matches during the home-and-away season, the most in the club's history, to finish seventh and qualify for finals for the first time, having never previously finished higher than twelfth since its first AFL season in 2011.

== Milestones ==
Round	Player/official	Club	Milestone
OR	Jake Lloyd	Sydney	250th AFL game
OR	Jack Crisp	Collingwood	250th AFL game
1	Darcy Byrne-Jones	Port Adelaide	200th AFL game
1	Jack Macrae	St Kilda	250th AFL game
2	Jarman Impey	Hawthorn	200th AFL game
2	Jack Darling	North Melbourne	300th AFL game
3	Rory Laird	Adelaide	250th AFL game
5	Tim Membrey	Collingwood	300th AFL goal
5	Ben King	Gold Coast	200th AFL goal
5	Adam Saad	Carlton	200th AFL game
6	Jamie Elliott	Collingwood	200th AFL game
7	Jamie Elliott	Collingwood	300th AFL goal
7	Luke Parker	North Melbourne	300th AFL game
8	Caleb Daniel	North Melbourne	200th AFL game
8	Jason Johannisen	Western Bulldogs	200th AFL game
8	Jack Gunston	Hawthorn	500th AFL goal
10	Touk Miller	Gold Coast	200th AFL game
10	Charlie Curnow	Carlton	300th AFL goal
10	Kamdyn McIntosh	Richmond	200th AFL game
11	Mitch Duncan	Geelong	300th AFL game
11	Toby Greene	Greater Western Sydney	250th AFL game
11	Chris Fagan	Brisbane Lions	200th AFL game coached
11	Christian Petracca	Melbourne	200th AFL game
12	Steele Sidebottom	Collingwood	200th AFL goal
14	Jack Sinclair	St Kilda	200th AFL game
15	Patrick Dangerfield	Geelong	350th AFL game
16	Marcus Bontempelli	Western Bulldogs	250th AFL game
16	Jake Melksham	Melbourne	200th AFL goal
17	Tom Liberatore	Western Bulldogs	250th AFL game
17	Toby Greene	Greater Western Sydney	400th AFL goal
17	Chris Scott	Geelong	350th AFL game coached
17	Jeremy Cameron	Geelong	700th AFL goal
18	Lachie Whitfield	Greater Western Sydney	250th AFL game
18	Nick Vlastuin	Richmond	250th AFL game
19	Hugh McCluggage	Brisbane Lions	200th AFL game
19	Clayton Oliver	Melbourne	200th AFL game
19	Daniel Rioli	Gold Coast	200th AFL game
20	Jacob Weitering	Carlton	200th AFL game
21	Christian Petracca	Melbourne	200th AFL goal
22	Steele Sidebottom	Collingwood	350th AFL game
22	Jack Steele	St Kilda	200th AFL game
22	Jack Higgins	St Kilda	200th AFL goal
22	Damien Hardwick	Gold Coast	350th AFL game coached
22	George Hewett	Carlton	200th AFL game
22	Jarrod Witts	Gold Coast	200th AFL game
22	Ed Langdon	Melbourne	200th AFL game
22	Liam Duggan	West Coast	200th AFL game
23	Steven May	Melbourne	250th AFL game
23	Cameron Zurhaar	North Melbourne	200th AFL goal
23	Tom Papley	Sydney	300th AFL goal
24	Zach Merrett	Essendon	250th AFL game
24	Tim Membrey	Collingwood	200th AFL game
24	Harry Himmelberg	Greater Western Sydney	200th AFL game
24	Charlie Cameron	Brisbane Lions	250th AFL game
24	Dayne Zorko	Brisbane Lions	300th AFL game
F1	Alex Neal-Bullen	Adelaide	200th AFL game
F1	Taylor Walker	Adelaide	300th AFL game
F1	Jaeger O'Meara	Fremantle	200th AFL game

Source: AFL Tables (players); other milestones sourced individually

== Coach departures ==
Outgoing coach	Club	Manner of departure	Date of departure	Caretaker coach	Incoming coach	Date of appointment
Ken Hinkley	Port Adelaide	Stepped down at end of season as part of succession plan	12 February 2025 (Note: Announcement of succession plan)	—	Josh Carr	
Simon Goodwin	Melbourne	Dismissed mid-season	5 August 2025	Troy Chaplin	Steven King	12 September 2025

== Awards ==
=== Major awards ===
- The Norm Smith Medal was awarded to the Brisbane Lions' Will Ashcroft, becoming the youngest and third player to do so in consecutive seasons.
- The Brownlow Medal was awarded to Gold Coast's Matt Rowell.
- The Coleman Medal was awarded to Geelong's Jeremy Cameron; his tally of 83 goals was the most in a home-and-away season since 2009.
- The Goal of the Year was awarded to Gold Coast's Noah Anderson.
- The Mark of the Year was awarded to the Western Bulldogs' Sam Darcy.
- The AFL Rising Star was awarded to Fremantle's Murphy Reid.

=== Leading goalkickers ===
1	Led the goalkicking at the end of the round
1	Led the goalkicking at the end of the home-and-away season
1_{1}	Subscript indicates the player's goal tally to that point of the season
–	Did not play during that round
X	Had a bye during that round

#	Player	Club	Home-and-away season (Coleman Medal)																										Finals series				Total	Games	Average
#	Player	Club	O	1	2	3	4	5	6	7	8	9	10	11	12	13	14	15	16	17	18	19	20	21	22	23	24		F1	F2	F3	GF	Total	Games	Average
1	Jeremy Cameron	Geelong	X_{0}	4_{4}	1_{5}	1_{6}	1_{7}	4_{11}	2_{13}	4_{17}	1_{18}	2_{20}	7_{27}	6_{33}	5_{38}	0_{38}	6_{44}	4_{48}	X_{48}	4_{52}	1_{53}	5_{58}	11_{69}	6_{75}	4_{79}	0_{79}	4_{83}		2_{85}	X_{85}	3_{88}	0_{88}	88	26	3.38
2	Jack Gunston	Hawthorn	–_{0}	–_{0}	2_{2}	2_{4}	X_{4}	6_{10}	3_{13}	4_{17}	3_{20}	3_{23}	–_{23}	0_{23}	2_{25}	1_{26}	2_{28}	X_{28}	7_{35}	3_{38}	1_{39}	3_{42}	3_{45}	4_{49}	4_{53}	7_{60}	2_{62}		3_{65}	5_{70}	3_{73}		73	23	3.17
3	Ben King	Gold Coast	X_{0}	6_{6}	X_{6}	4_{10}	2_{12}	5_{17}	1_{18}	5_{23}	1_{24}	3_{27}	2_{29}	2_{31}	1_{32}	1_{33}	X_{33}	2_{35}	3_{38}	4_{42}	2_{44}	1_{45}	2_{47}	4_{51}	6_{57}	2_{59}	3_{62}	7_{69}	0_{69}	2_{71}			71	25	2.84
4	Jamie Elliott	Collingwood	2_{2}	2_{4}	1_{5}	X_{5}	0_{5}	3_{8}	2_{10}	5_{15}	1_{16}	6_{22}	1_{23}	5_{28}	5_{33}	1_{34}	X_{34}	2_{36}	1_{37}	4_{41}	3_{44}	2_{46}	1_{47}	1_{48}	0_{48}	2_{50}	2_{52}		4_{56}	X_{56}	4_{60}		60	25	2.40
4	Aaron Naughton	Western Bulldogs	X_{0}	3_{3}	0_{3}	1_{4}	1_{5}	3_{8}	3_{11}	1_{12}	3_{15}	0_{15}	1_{16}	3_{19}	X_{19}	0_{19}	3_{22}	1_{23}	3_{26}	5_{31}	5_{36}	2_{38}	7_{45}	5_{50}	5_{55}	3_{58}	2_{60}						60	23	2.61
4	Riley Thilthorpe	Adelaide	X_{0}	3_{3}	3_{6}	3_{9}	5_{14}	1_{15}	1_{16}	3_{19}	1_{20}	3_{23}	0_{23}	2_{25}	2_{27}	1_{28}	0_{28}	X_{28}	5_{33}	0_{33}	6_{39}	2_{41}	3_{44}	4_{48}	3_{51}	1_{52}	3_{55}		2_{57}	3_{60}			60	25	2.40
7	Mitch Georgiades	Port Adelaide	X_{0}	0_{0}	4_{4}	2_{6}	3_{9}	3_{12}	3_{15}	2_{17}	1_{18}	2_{20}	1_{21}	3_{24}	X_{24}	1_{25}	7_{32}	1_{33}	5_{38}	4_{42}	3_{45}	2_{47}	1_{48}	3_{51}	2_{53}	1_{54}	4_{58}						58	23	2.52
8	Logan Morris	Brisbane Lions	X_{0}	1_{1}	3_{4}	1_{5}	2_{7}	4_{11}	0_{11}	2_{13}	–_{13}	0_{13}	3_{16}	2_{18}	2_{20}	0_{20}	5_{25}	5_{30}	X_{30}	1_{31}	2_{33}	1_{34}	0_{34}	6_{40}	3_{43}	4_{47}	1_{48}		1_{49}	2_{51}	1_{52}	1_{53}	53	26	2.04
9	Sam Darcy	Western Bulldogs	X_{0}	1_{1}	4_{5}	2_{7}	5_{12}	2_{14}	0_{14}	–_{14}	–_{14}	–_{14}	–_{14}	–_{14}	X_{14}	–_{14}	3_{17}	5_{22}	3_{25}	4_{29}	2_{31}	1_{32}	6_{38}	5_{43}	2_{45}	3_{48}	0_{48}						48	17	2.82
10	Jack Higgins	St Kilda	X_{0}	2_{2}	4_{6}	3_{9}	3_{12}	2_{14}	3_{17}	3_{20}	1_{21}	2_{23}	5_{28}	0_{28}	1_{29}	X_{29}	1_{30}	0_{30}	1_{31}	2_{33}	0_{33}	2_{35}	4_{39}	2_{41}	2_{43}	3_{46}	0_{46}						46	23	2.00
10	Jesse Hogan	Greater Western Sydney	–_{0}	–_{0}	X_{0}	4_{4}	9_{13}	2_{15}	–_{15}	2_{17}	1_{18}	7_{25}	1_{26}	4_{30}	0_{30}	2_{32}	6_{38}	2_{40}	X_{40}	–_{40}	1_{41}	–_{41}	2_{43}	0_{43}	–_{43}	–_{43}	–_{43}		3_{46}				46	16	2.88
Other end-of-round leaders
	Nick Larkey	North Melbourne	X_{0}	5_{5}	3_{8}	4_{12}	2_{14}	2_{16}	1_{17}	1_{18}	2_{20}	1_{21}	2_{23}	1_{24}	X_{24}	0_{24}	3_{27}	1_{28}	5_{33}	5_{38}	–_{38}	–_{38}	–_{38}	3_{41}	–_{41}	–_{41}	–_{41}						41	17	2.41

Source: AFL Tables

=== Club best and fairest ===
Player(s)	Club	Award	Ref.
Jordan Dawson	Adelaide	Malcolm Blight Medal	
Josh Dunkley	Brisbane Lions	Merrett–Murray Medal	
George Hewett	Carlton	John Nicholls Medal	
Darcy Cameron	Collingwood	Copeland Trophy	
Zach Merrett	Essendon	Crichton Medal	
Caleb Serong	Fremantle	Doig Medal	
Max Holmes	Geelong	Carji Greeves Medal	
Matt Rowell	Gold Coast	Club Champion	
Tom Green	Greater Western Sydney	Kevin Sheedy Medal	
Jack Gunston	Hawthorn	Peter Crimmins Medal	
Max Gawn	Melbourne	Keith 'Bluey' Truscott Trophy	
Harry Sheezel, Tristan Xerri	North Melbourne	Syd Barker Medal	
Zak Butters	Port Adelaide	John Cahill Medal	
Tim Taranto	Richmond	Jack Dyer Medal	
Nasiah Wanganeen-Milera	St Kilda	Trevor Barker Award	
Isaac Heeney	Sydney	Bob Skilton Medal	
Liam Baker	West Coast	John Worsfold Medal	
Ed Richards	Western Bulldogs	Charles Sutton Medal	

== See also ==
- 2025 AFL Women's season
