= Connor Macdonald =

Australian rules footballer (born 2003)

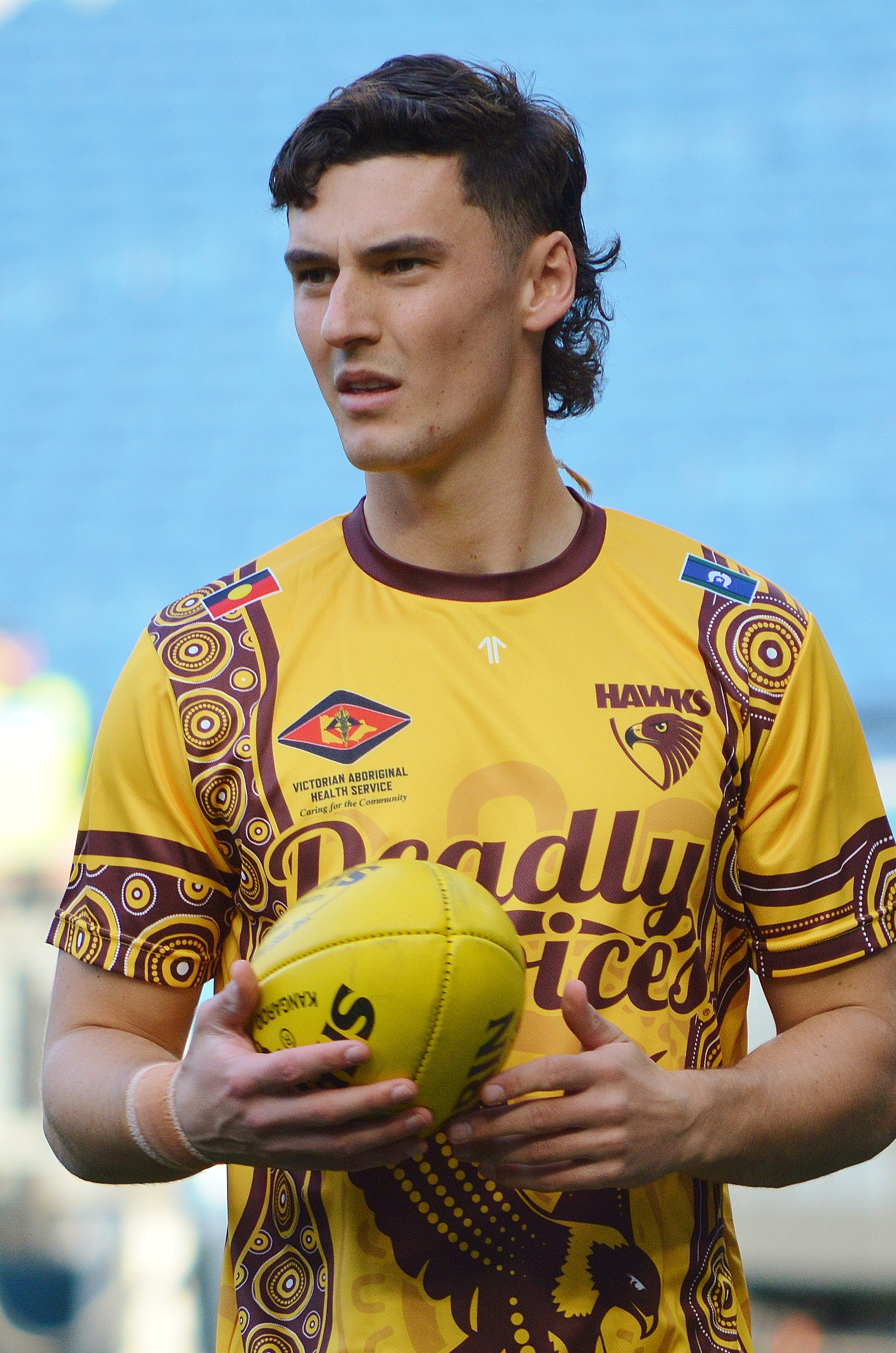
- Macdonald in May 2026

Personal information
- Nickname: Croc
- Born: 13 January 2003 (age 23)
- Original team: Dandenong Stingrays/Haileybury
- Draft: No. 26, 2021 national draft
- Debut: Round 1, 2022, Hawthorn vs. North Melbourne, at MCG
- Height: 185 cm (6 ft 1 in)
- Weight: 83 kg (183 lb)
- Position: Half Forward/Midfielder

Club information
- Current club: Hawthorn
- Number: 9

Playing career^{1}
Years	Club	Games (Goals)
2022–	Hawthorn	115 (87)
- ^{1} Playing statistics correct to the end of 2026.

Connor Macdonald (born 13 January 2003) is a professional Australian rules footballer with the Hawthorn Football Club in the Australian Football League (AFL).

== Early career ==
Macdonald attended Haileybury College, where the school's football coach, Hall of Famer Matthew Lloyd oversaw his football development. He was the first in his family to attend a private school. He also played with the Dandenong Stingrays in the State under 18 competition where, in a COVID interrupted season he managed to average just under 30 disposals in his four games in 2021. In 2021 he also played Victoria Country at the national under 18 championships. He previously attended Rowville Sports Academy under the guidance of Essendon premiership player Darren Bewick.

He played his junior football for Narre South Lions and Doveton Doves in the South East Juniors.

== AFL career ==
In the 2021 AFL draft, Hawthorn used their third pick, number 26, to draft Macdonald. Macdonald debuted for Hawthorn alongside Josh Ward in the opening round of the 2022 AFL season against North Melbourne at the MCG.

Macdonald managed to play the first nine games of the season before being rested under the club policy of resting young players to help freshen them up for the long season.

In 2024 C-Mac lifted in his intensity and vastly improved on previous seasons. Part of the 2024 HOK ball "Rat Pack", Macdonald helped to propel the Hawks to the clubs first finals appearance since 2018, where they would then face the Western Bulldogs. Against the bulldogs, Macdonald would record 23 disposals and kick 2 goals in the 99–62 victory for the Hawks, leading them to play Port Adelaide, which they would lose 72-75, ending their 2024 season.

In December 2025, he was awarded the number 9 guernsey after 90 games in the AFL. This was previously Changkuoth Jiath's number before he was traded to the Melbourne Football Club.

== Statistics ==
Updated to the end of 2026.

Legend
G	Goals	K	Kicks	D	Disposals	T	Tackles
B	Behinds	H	Handballs	M	Marks

Season	Team	No.	Games	Totals							Averages (per game)							Votes
Season	Team	No.	Games	G	B	K	H	D	M	T	G	B	K	H	D	M	T	Votes
2022	Hawthorn	31	20	9	9	160	103	263	67	35	0.5	0.5	8.0	5.2	13.2	3.4	1.8	0
2023	Hawthorn	31	21	12	15	209	154	363	84	54	0.6	0.7	10.0	7.3	17.3	4.0	2.6	0
2024	Hawthorn	31	25	28	19	249	187	436	132	69	1.1	0.8	10.0	7.5	17.4	5.3	2.8	1
2025	Hawthorn	31	24	22	18	217	140	357	96	72	0.9	0.8	9.0	5.8	14.9	4.0	3.0	0
2026	Hawthorn	9	22	16	14	296	222	518	112	81	0.6	0.6	11.8	8.9	20.7	4.5	3.2	11
Career			115	87	75	1131	806	1937	491	311	0.8	0.7	9.8	7.0	16.8	4.3	2.7	12

== Honours and achievements ==
Team

- McClelland Trophy (Hawthorn): 2024
