= 2026 Gold Coast Suns season =

18th season of the Gold Coast Suns

Gold Coast Suns
2026 season
- Chair: Bob East

The 2026 season is the 18th season in the history of the Gold Coast Suns, its 16th season in the Australian Football League (AFL) and its 8th season in the AFL Women's (AFLW).

After reaching an semi-final the previous season, Gold Coast had high expectations for the 2026 AFL season, helped by the high-profile addition of Christian Petracca to its playing list. The club won seven of its first ten matches, but suffered a ten-match losing streak beginning in round 11 and missed the finals series, ultimately finishing thirteenth on the ladder.

Having received the wooden spoon in 2025, Gold Coast's AFLW team significantly improved during the 2026 season with nine wins in the home-and-away season, including a team record six consecutive victories. The club finished fifth on the ladder, narrowly missing out on the top four by 0.2 percentage points (or the equivalent of one behind) and were eliminated from the finals series in week one after an 18-point loss to Hawthorn at People First Stadium.

In addition to its senior teams, Gold Coast's reserves team competed in the Victorian Football League (VFL) for the 6th season. The team finished last on the ladder to claim the wooden spoon for the first time since joining the VFL and second time overall (after the 2014 NEAFL season).

== AFL ==
2026 AFL season
- Coach: Damien Hardwick
- Captain: Noah Anderson
- Home grounds: People First Stadium; TIO Stadium
- Home-and-away: 13th
- Club Champion: Bodhi Uwland
- Leading goalkicker: Ben King (60)

=== Season summary ===
2026 is the Gold Coast's fourth under coach Damien Hardwick, and second with Noah Anderson as captain.

=== Coaching staff ===
2026 Gold Coast Suns coaching staff
Role	Name
Senior coach	Damien Hardwick
Assistant coach	Shaun Grigg
Assistant coach	Josh Drummond
Assistant coach - Forward	Brad Miller
VFL Head Coach/Head of Development	Tate Kaesler
Development coach	Richard Douglas
Development coach	Hugh Greenwood

=== Playing list ===
==== Additions ====
Player	Reason	Ref
Beau Addinsall	Pick 18, 2025 AFL draft	
Koby Coulson	Pick 46, 2025 AFL draft	
Dylan Patterson	Pick 5, 2025 AFL draft	
Christian Petracca	Trade from Melbourne	
Jai Murray	Pick 17, 2025 AFL draft	
Avery Thomas	Pick 28, 2025 AFL draft	
Jamarra Ugle-Hagan	Trade from Western Bulldogs	
Zeke Uwland	Pick 2, 2025 AFL draft	

==== Departures ====
Player	Reason	Ref
Ben Ainsworth	Trade to Carlton	
Tom Berry	Delisted	
Connor Budarick	Trade to Western Bulldogs	
Brayden Fiorini	Trade to Essendon	
Sam Flanders	Trade to St Kilda	
Lloyd Johnston	Delisted	
Sean Lemmens	Retired	
Malcolm Rosas Jr	Trade to Sydney	
Alex Sexton	Delisted	
David Swallow	Retired	

==== 2026 playing squad ====
2026 Gold Coast Suns AFL squad
Senior list		Rookie list	Coaching staff
1 Mac Andrew; 2 John Noble; 3 Christian Petracca; 4 Jed Walter; 5 Alex Davies; 6 Bodhi Uwland; 7 Nick Holman; 8 Leo Lombard; 9 Jamarra Ugle-Hagan; 10 Charlie Ballard; 11 Touk Miller (vc); 12 Elliott Himmelberg; 14 Lachie Weller; 15 Noah Anderson (c); 16 Joel Jeffrey; 17 Daniel Rioli; 18 Matt Rowell; 19 Bailey Humphrey; 20 Ethan Read	22 Ben Long; 23 Ned Moyle; 25 Sam Collins (vc); 26 Will Graham; 27 Wil Powell; 28 Jarrod Witts; 29 Jake Rogers; 30 Dylan Patterson; 31 Cooper Bell; 32 Zeke Uwland; 33 Sam Clohesy; 34 Ben King; 35 Jai Murray; 38 Beau Addinsall; 41 Avery Thomas; 43 Koby Coulson; 46 Caleb Graham; 50 Jy Farrar	36 Zak Evans (B); 37 Max Knobel; 39 Lachie Gulbin (B); 42 Asher Eastham; 44 Ben Jepson; 45 Caleb Lewis; 48 Oscar Adams	**Head coach**: Damien Hardwick; **Assistant coaches**: Josh Drummond (back line); Shaun Grigg (midfield); Brad Miller (forward line); Richard Douglas (development); Hugh Greenwood (development); Legend: (c) Captain(s); (vc) Vice-captain(s); (B) Category B rookie(s); italics – Inactive; (ret) Retired; Long-term injury; Updated: 10 July 2026; Source(s): coaches, injuries

=== AFL season ===
==== Pre-season ====
Date and local time	Opponent	Scores (Gold Coast's scores indicated in bold)			Venue	Crowd
Date and local time	Opponent	Home	Away	Result	Venue	Crowd
Friday, 19 February (8:55 pm)	St Kilda	**4.12 (36)**	16.11 (107)	Lost by 71 points	People First Stadium (H)	
Sunday, 26 February (7:10 pm)	Brisbane Lions	19.12 (126)	**15.11 (101)**	Lost by 25 points	Brighton Homes Arena (A)	

==== Home-and-away season ====
Rd	Date and local time	Opponent	Scores (Gold Coast's scores indicated in bold)			Venue	Crowd	Ladder
Rd	Date and local time	Opponent	Home	Away	Result	Venue	Crowd	Ladder
OR	Friday, 6 March (8:05 pm)	Geelong	**19.11 (125)**	10.9 (69)	Won by 56 points	People First Stadium (H)	19,859	2nd
1	Sunday, 15 March (7:10 pm)	West Coast	**20.11 (131)**	10.12 (72)	Won by 59 points	People First Stadium (H)	13,309	2nd
2	Saturday, 21 March (1:15 pm)	Richmond	9.6 (60)	**19.14 (128)**	Won by 68 points	MCG (A)	30,468	1st
3	Bye							1st
4	Sunday, 5 April (3:15 pm)	Melbourne	16.13 (109)	**14.5 (89)**	Lost by 20 points	MCG (A)	24,287	3rd
5	Saturday, 11 April (4:15 pm)	Sydney	14.16 (100)	**9.14 (68)**	Lost by 32 points	Norwood Oval (N)	9,228	5th
6	Saturday, 18 April (1:15 pm)	Essendon	**17.17 (119)**	17.8 (110)	Won by 9 points	People First Stadium (H)	19,039	4th
7	Saturday, 25 April (12:15 pm)	Hawthorn	16.16 (112)	**9.9 (63)**	Lost by 49 points	UTAS Stadium (A)	8,263	7th
8	Sunday, 3 May (7:20 pm)	Greater Western Sydney	**11.17 (83)**	8.15 (63	Won by 20 points	People First Stadium (H)	13,537	5th
9	Saturday, 9 May (7:10 pm)	St Kilda	**13.11 (89)**	8.12 (60)	Won by 29 points	TIO Stadium (H)	10,627	6th
10	Friday, 15 May (8:10 pm)	Port Adelaide	**15.8 (98)**	10.13 (73)	Won by 25 points	TIO Stadium (H)	11,974	4th
11	Saturday, 23 May (1:15 pm)	North Melbourne	17.9 (111)	**16.9 (105)**	Lost by 6 points	Marvel Stadium (A)	16,260	5th
12	Bye							5th
13	Saturday, 6 June (5:15 pm)	Brisbane Lions	**11.9 (75)**	15.16 (106)	Lost by 31 points	People First Stadium (H)	21,139	7th
14	Friday, 12 June (7:40 pm)	Geelong	15.15 (105)	**8.12 (60)**	Lost by 45 points	GMHBA Stadium (A)	30,276	9th
15	Friday, 19 June (7:40 pm)	Hawthorn	**14.13 (97)**	17.11 (113)	Lost by 16 points	People First Stadium (H)	19,576	9th
16	Sunday, 28 June (5:10 pm)	Fremantle	11.14 (80)	**3.11 (29)**	Lost by 51 points	Optus Stadium (A)	50,602	11th
17	Saturday, 4 July (4:15 pm)	Collingwood	**15.8 (98)**	15.14 (104)	Lost by 6 points	People First Stadium (H)	21,072	14th
18	Saturday, 11 July (8:10 pm)	Adelaide	19.14 (128)	**7.7 (49)**	Lost by 79 points	Adelaide Oval (A)	40,165	14th
19	Sunday, 19 July (3:15 pm)	Western Bulldogs	**9.14 (68)**	11.11 (77)	Lost by 9 points	People First Stadium (H)	14,809	14th
20	Saturday, 25 July (1:05 pm)	Carlton	16.14 (110)	**15.7 (97)**	Lost by 13 points	Marvel Stadium (A)	26,945	14th
21	Sunday, 2 August (3:15 pm)	Melbourne	**16.9 (105)**	18.6 (114)	Lost by 9 points	People First Stadium (H)	14,963	14th
22	Sunday, 9 August (1:10 pm)	Greater Western Sydney	11.11 (77)	**11.13 (79)**	Won by 2 points	Corroboree Group Oval (A)	5,814	14th
23	Saturday, 15 August (6:15 pm)	Brisbane Lions	14.11 (95)	**6.17 (53)**	Lost by 42 points	The Gabba (A)	30,413	14th
24	Thursday, 20 August (9:30 pm)	St Kilda	12.8 (80)	**14.19 (103)**	Won by 23 points	Marvel Stadium (A)	14,429	13th

== AFLW ==
2026 AFLW season
- Coach: Rhyce Shaw
- Captains: Niamh McLaughlin & Lucy Single
- Home grounds: People First Stadium; Great Barrier Reef Arena
- Home-and-away: 5th
- Finals series: Elimination final
- Club Champion: TBD
- Leading goalkicker: TBD

== VFL ==
2026 VFL season
- Coach: Tate Kaesler
- Captain: Alex Sexton
- Home grounds: People First Stadium; Austworld Centre Oval
- Home-and-away: 22nd (last)
- Player of the Year: Caleb Graham
- Leading goalkicker: Jamarra Ugle-Hagan (26)
