= 2018 Gold Coast Suns season =

Australian rules football club season

The 2018 Gold Coast Suns season was the Gold Coast Suns' 8th season in the Australian Football League. They also fielded a reserves team in the NEAFL.

== AFL ==
=== Senior personnel ===
After round 20 in the 2017 season, senior coach Rodney Eade was sacked. In October 2017 it was announced that former Port Adelaide premiership player and Sydney assistant coach Stuart Dew had signed a three-year deal to become the new senior coach at Gold Coast.

=== List changes ===
At the end of the 2017 season, the Suns announced that they had delisted five players, including three rookie-listed players. Early in the trade period, half-back Adam Saad requested a trade to Essendon, and the Suns attempted to trade him for Essendon's first-round draft pick. When Essendon instead traded that pick to Greater Western Sydney for Devon Smith, the Suns instead received Essendon's second round pick for the 2018 draft. Fremantle player Lachie Weller requested a trade to the Suns, but Fremantle wanted their number 2 pick in the 2017 draft in exchange. To avoid trading away their very early pick, Gold Coast exchanged a number of draft picks with West Coast to secure their first round pick in the 2018 draft, but Fremantle didn't budge and would only accept the number 2 pick. On the last day of the trade period the Suns accepted the trade, also receiving pick 41 from the Dockers. The Suns also managed to secure Harrison Wigg from Adelaide and Aaron Young from Port Adelaide.

One of the biggest trades of the 2017 trade period was that of two-time Brownlow medallist Gary Ablett. Ablett had originally asked to be traded from the Suns to Geelong, his original team, in 2016, but no agreement could be reached. He requested a trade again in 2017, and Gold Coast attempted to secure a player from Geelong's best 22 in exchange, but again nothing could be settled on. On the last day of the trade period the Suns accepted a deal where they would receive pick 19 (a selection Geelong got as compensation for losing Steven Motlop) and Geelong's second round pick in the 2018 draft while losing Ablett, pick 24 and their fourth round pick in the 2018 draft.

==== Retirements and deslistings ====
Player	Date	Reason	Career games	Career goals	Ref.
Jarrad Grant	4 September 2017	Delisted	95	94	
Mitch Hallahan	4 September 2017	Delisted	26	7	
Keegan Brooksby	4 September 2017	Delisted	14	3	
Ryan Davis	4 September 2017	Delisted	35	19	
Cameron Loersch	4 September 2017	Delisted	0	0	

==== Trades ====
Date	Gained	From	Lost	Ref.
16 October 2017	2018 second round pick (Essendon)	Essendon	Adam Saad	
18 October 2017	Harrison Wigg; Pick 54; 2018 fourth round pick (Adelaide)	Adelaide	Pick 39	
19 October 2017	Pick 50; 2018 first round pick (West Coast)	West Coast	Pick 21; Pick 26; Pick 37; 2018 second round pick (Gold Coast)	
19 October 2017	Aaron Young	Port Adelaide	2018 fourth round pick (Adelaide)	
19 October 2017	Pick 19; 2018 second round pick (Geelong)	Geelong	Gary Ablett; Pick 24; 2018 fourth round pick (Gold Coast)	
19 October 2017	Lachie Weller; Pick 41	Fremantle	Pick 2	
19 October 2017	2018 third round pick (Fremantle)	Fremantle	Brandon Matera	

=== Squad ===
Gold Coast Suns · AFL personnel
Playing list		Inactive list	Coaching staff
1 Mac Andrew; 2 John Noble; 3 Christian Petracca; 4 Jed Walter; 5 Alex Davies; 6 Bodhi Uwland; 8 Leo Lombard; 10 Charlie Ballard; 11 Touk Miller (vc); 12 Elliott Himmelberg; 14 Lachie Weller; 15 Noah Anderson (c); 16 Joel Jeffrey; 17 Daniel Rioli; 18 Matt Rowell; 19 Bailey Humphrey; 20 Ethan Read; 22 Ben Long; 23 Ned Moyle; 25 Sam Collins (vc)	27 Wil Powell; 28 Jarrod Witts; 29 Jake Rogers; 30 Dylan Patterson; 32 Zeke Uwland; 33 Sam Clohesy; 35 Jai Murray; 36 Zak Evans (B); 37 Max Knobel (A); 38 Beau Addinsall; 39 Lachie Gulbin (B); 41 Avery Thomas; 43 Koby Coulson; 44 Ben Jepson (A); 45 Caleb Lewis (A); 48 Oscar Adams (A); 50 Jy Farrar; Sam Butler; Scott Pendlebury; Aidan Schubert		Senior coach: Damien Hardwick; Assistant coaches: Josh Drummond (back line); Shaun Grigg (midfield); Brad Miller (forward line); Richard Douglas (development); Hugh Greenwood (development); Nathan Murphy (development); Legend: (c) captain; (vc) vice-captain; (A) Category A rookie; (B) Category B rookie; Updated: 6 November 2026; Sources: Players (rookies); coaches

=== Ladder ===
Pos	Team	Pld	W	L	D	PF	PA	PP	Pts	Qualification
1	Richmond	22	18	4	0	2143	1574	136.1	72	2018 finals
2	West Coast (P)	22	16	6	0	2012	1657	121.4	64	2018 finals
3	Collingwood	22	15	7	0	2046	1699	120.4	60	2018 finals
4	Hawthorn	22	15	7	0	1972	1642	120.1	60	2018 finals
5	Melbourne	22	14	8	0	2299	1749	131.4	56	2018 finals
6	Sydney	22	14	8	0	1822	1664	109.5	56	2018 finals
7	Greater Western Sydney	22	13	8	1	1898	1661	114.3	54	2018 finals
8	Geelong	22	13	9	0	2045	1554	131.6	52	2018 finals
9	North Melbourne	22	12	10	0	1950	1790	108.9	48	
10	Port Adelaide	22	12	10	0	1780	1654	107.6	48	
11	Essendon	22	12	10	0	1932	1838	105.1	48	
12	Adelaide	22	12	10	0	1941	1865	104.1	48	
13	Western Bulldogs	22	8	14	0	1575	2037	77.3	32	
14	Fremantle	22	8	14	0	1556	2041	76.2	32	
15	Brisbane Lions	22	5	17	0	1825	2049	89.1	20	
16	St Kilda	22	4	17	1	1606	2125	75.6	18	
17	Gold Coast	22	4	18	0	1308	2182	59.9	16	
18	Carlton	22	2	20	0	1353	2282	59.3	8	

Source: AFL
Rules for classification: 1) points; 2) percentage; 3) number of points for.
(P) Premiers
