= List of Gold Coast Suns players =

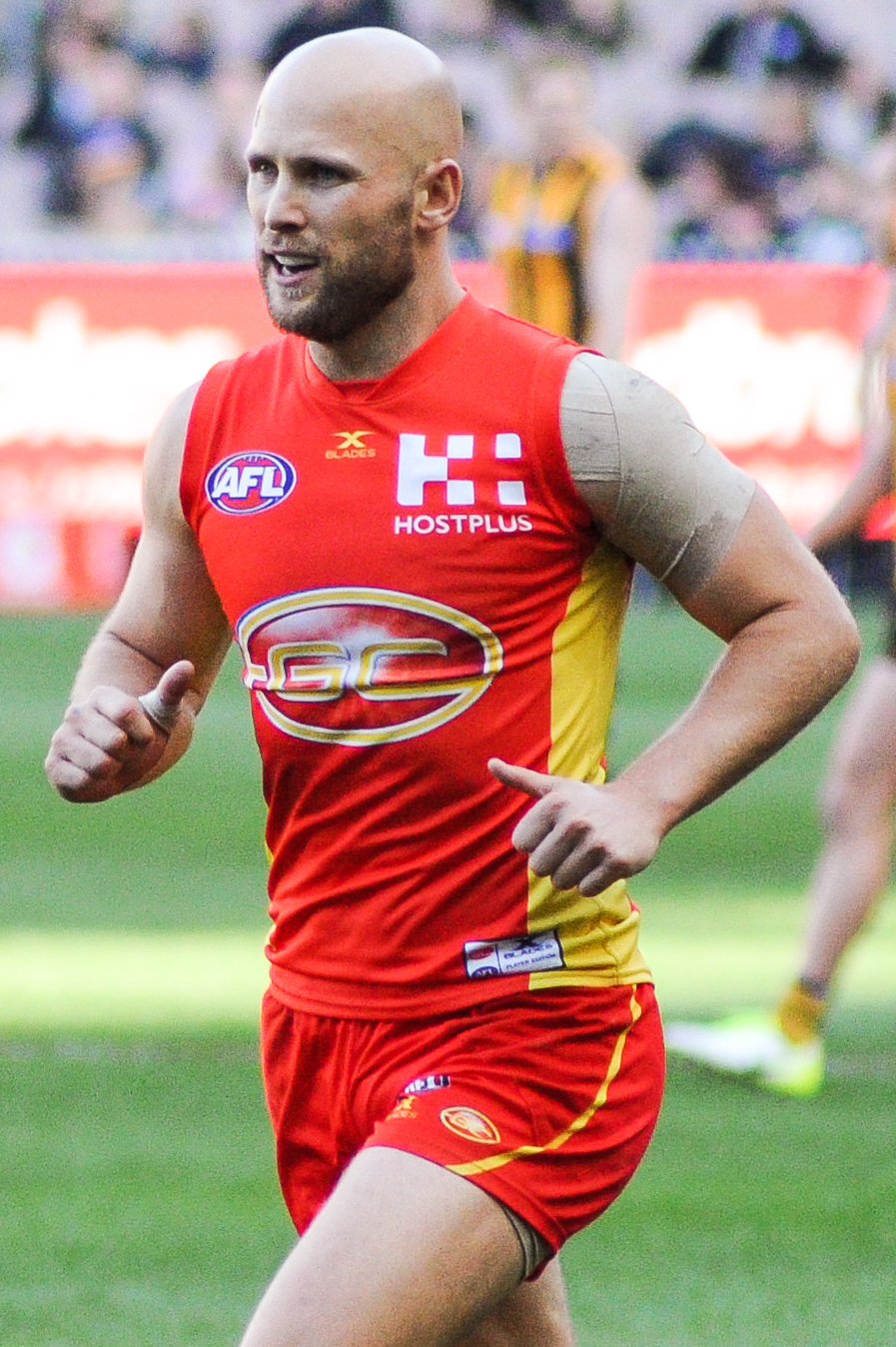
Gary Ablett Jr. was Gold Coast's inaugural captain from 2011 to 2016.

The Gold Coast Suns are a professional Australian rules football club based in Gold Coast, Queensland. The club was granted a licence to join the Australian Football League (AFL) as an expansion club in March 2009, and played its first match during the second round of the 2011 AFL season. (Note: Due to the uneven number of teams in the league in 2011, Gold Coast had a bye in the first round of the season.)

In preparation for the club's entry into the league, Gold Coast was provided with a range of recruitment concessions by the AFL, including additional selections in the 2010 AFL draft, early access to recruit underaged players, (Note: Gold Coast was granted special dispensation to recruit up to twelve players, born between 1 January and 30 April 1992, at the end of 2009. Since these players were aged 17 at the time, they were younger than the minimum draft age of 18 years old.) and access to existing clubs' out-of-contract players in the preceding offseason. The club was also allowed to operate with an increased playing list size and salary cap in its first four seasons, before these allowances were reduced to be in line with the existing AFL clubs from 2015 as planned.

The maximum playing list size of each AFL club is 47 players, consisting of 38–40 senior-listed players and the remainder as rookie-listed players. (Note: The main ways AFL clubs can recruit players each off-season are: the free agency and trade period, the father–son rule, the academy system, and the various drafts (national, rookie, pre-season).) Rookie players receive a reduced salary in comparison to senior-listed players, and are not necessarily automatically eligible for selection in games. As every club is required to make a minimum of three changes to its list at the end of each season, not every player necessarily makes a senior appearance for the club before being removed from the playing list.

Since its first competitive appearance, 161 players have represented the club in an AFL premiership match. The premiership competition is inclusive of home-and-away and finals series matches only, and does not include pre-season matches or representative games (such as State of Origin or International rules football). As of the conclusion of the 2018 season, the player with the highest individual games tally for Gold Coast is Jarrod Harbrow, who has played 220 matches for the club since 2011. Tom Lynch has scored the most goals for the club, attaining 254 goals in his 131 matches.

== AFL players ==
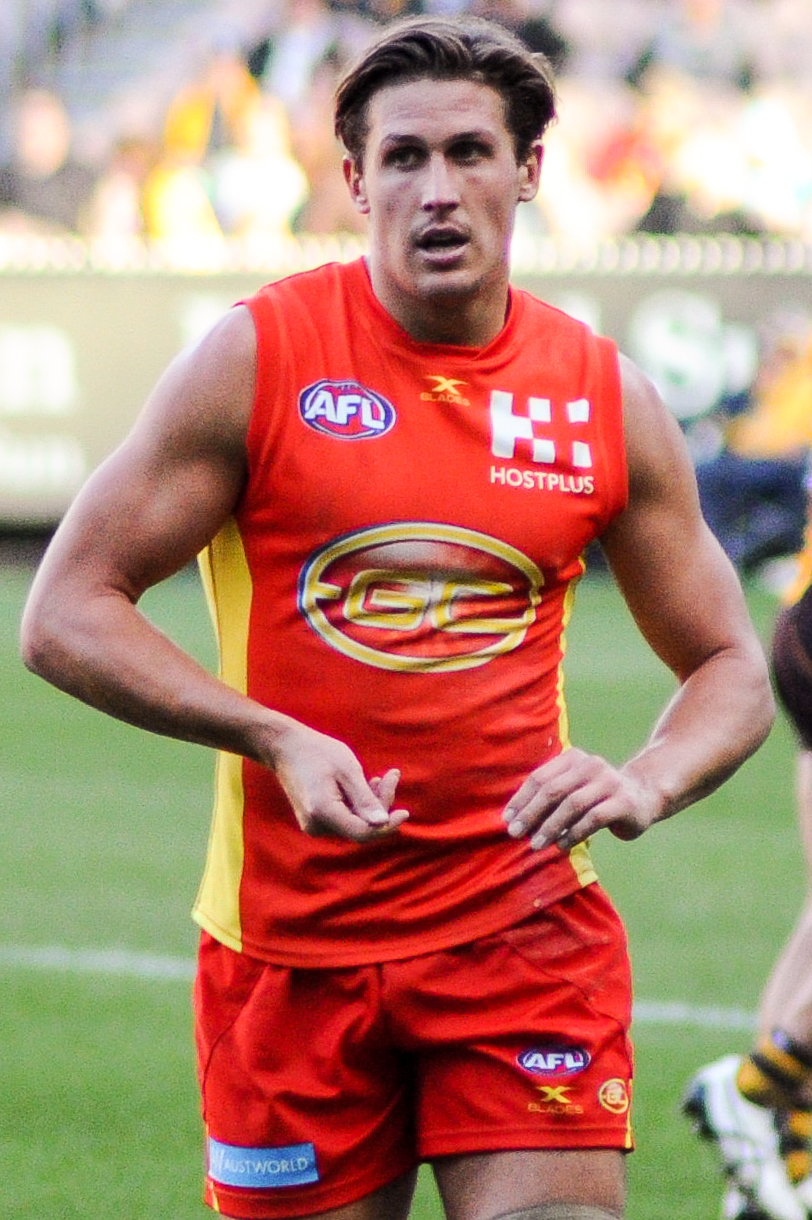
David Swallow played 249 games after being selected with the number-one overall selection in the 2010 national draft.

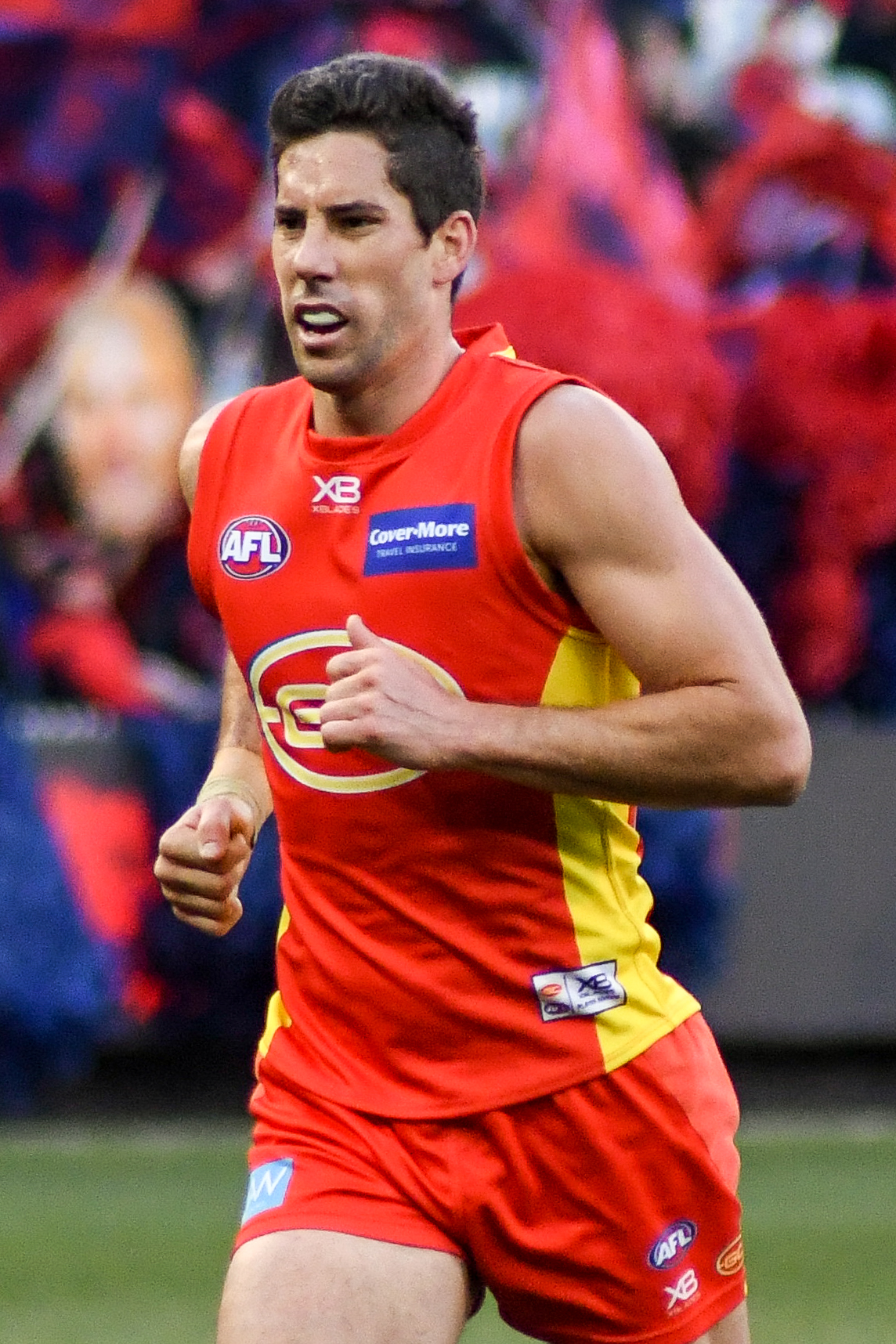
Michael Rischitelli played 125 games for Gold Coast between 2011 and 2018.

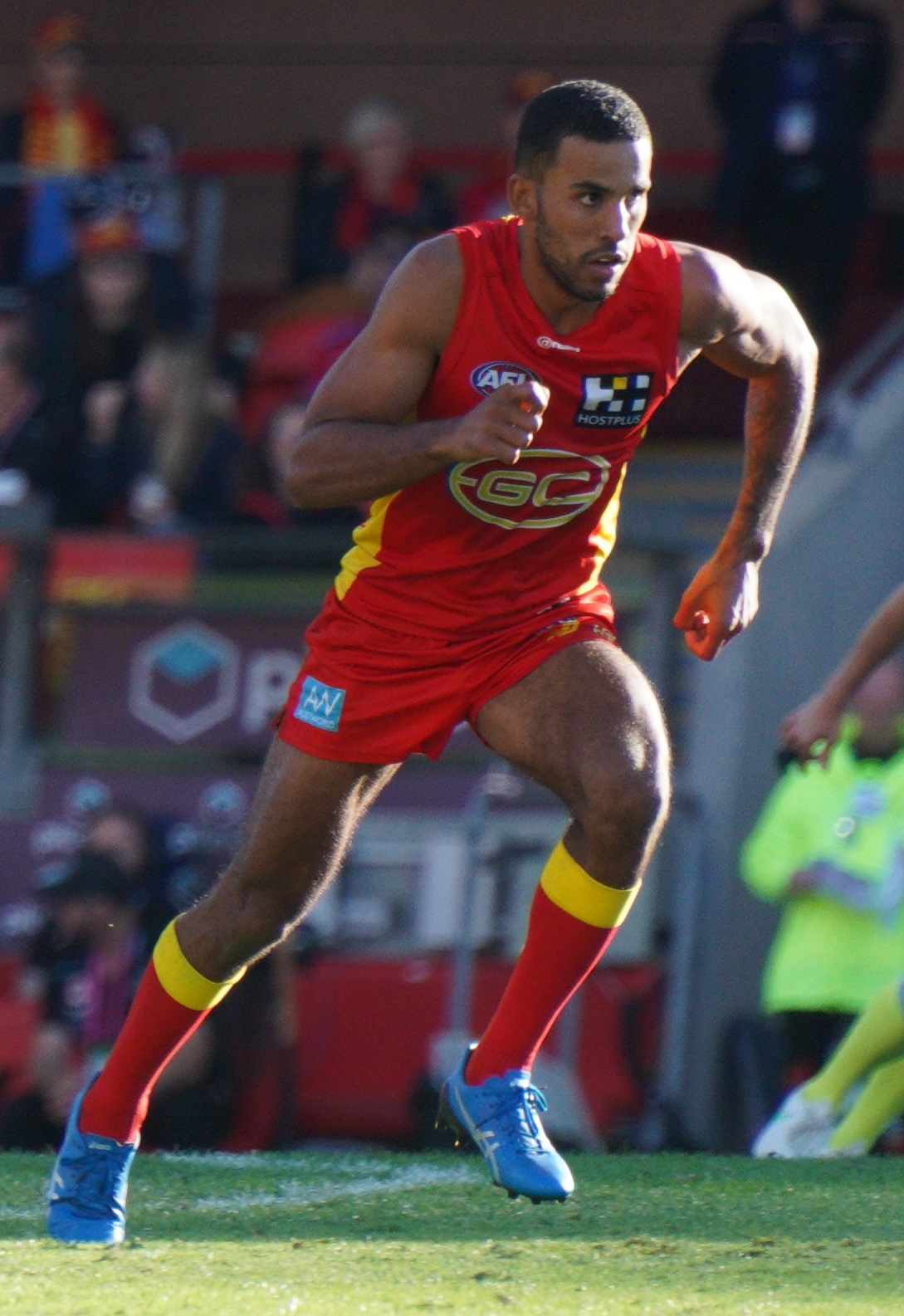
Touk Miller is a two time All-Australian, two time Gold Coast Suns Club Champion, and current co-captain since 2022.

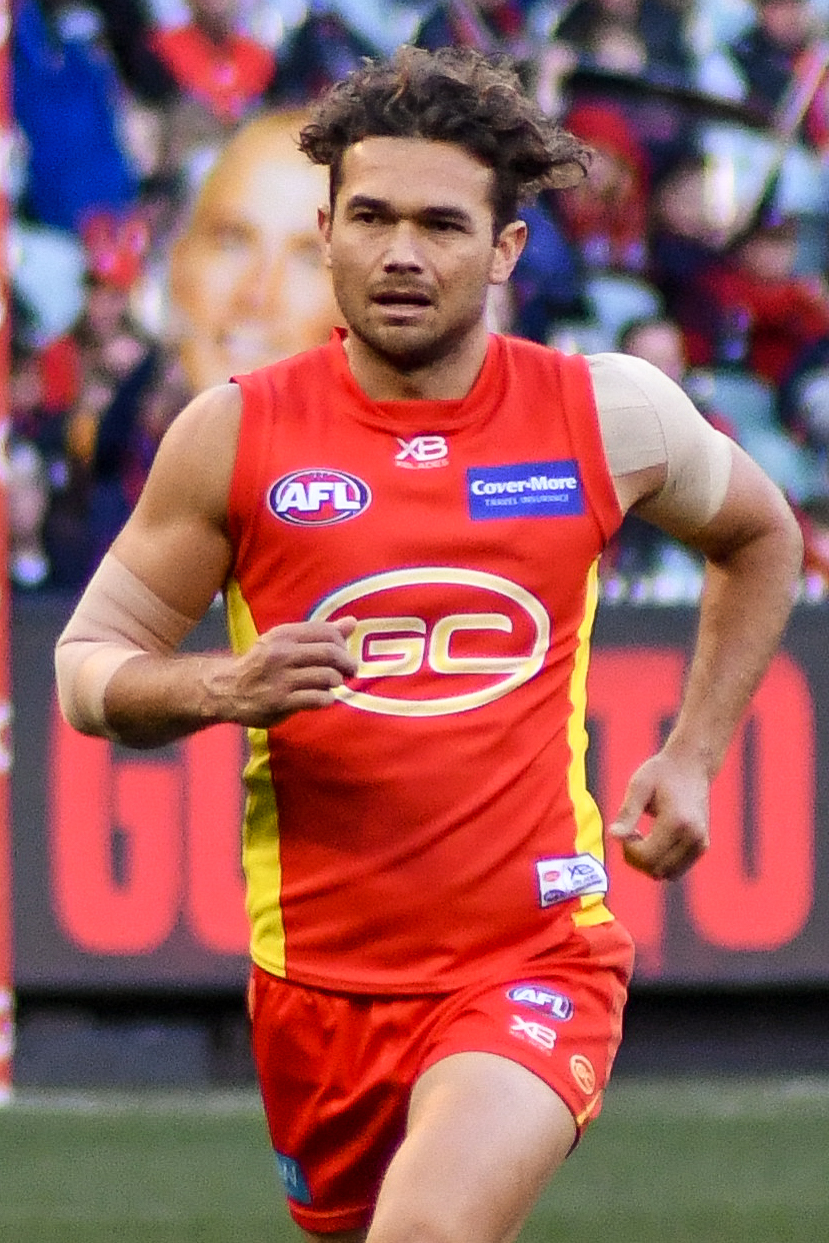
Jarrod Harbrow was Gold Coast's Club Champion in 2018.

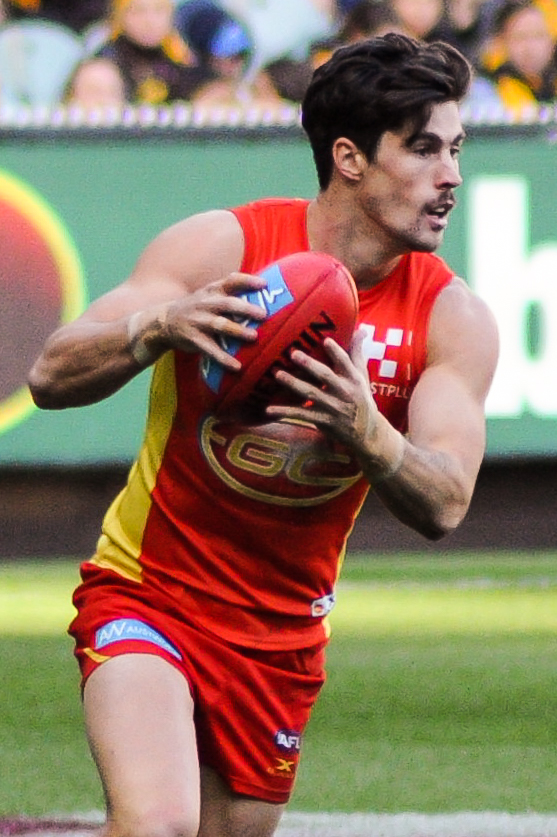
Alex Sexton led Gold Coast's leading goalkicking in 2018 and 2019.

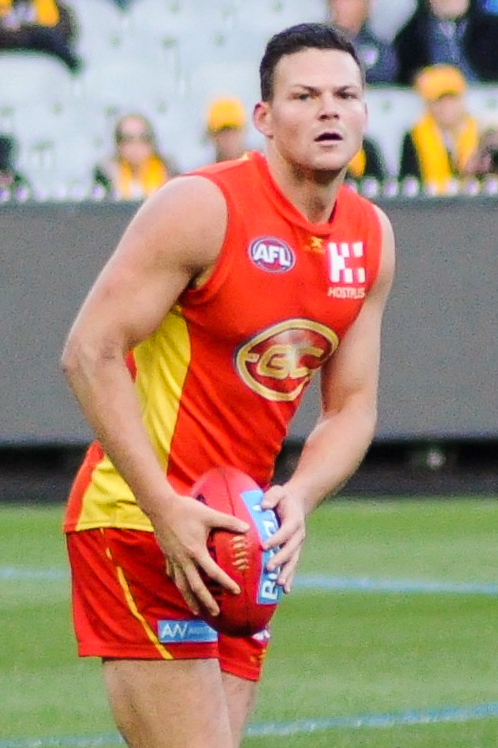
Steven May captained Gold Coast from 2017 to 2018.

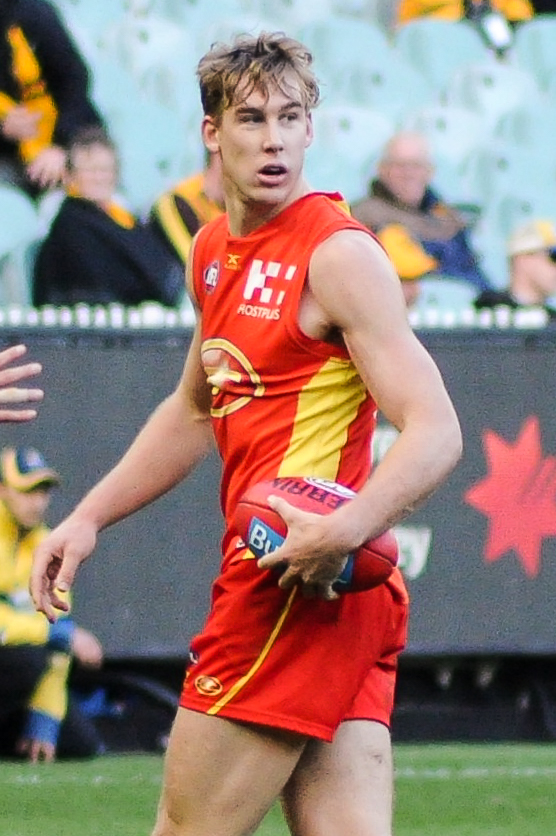
Tom Lynch scored 254 goals in 131 games for Gold Coast between 2011 and 2018.

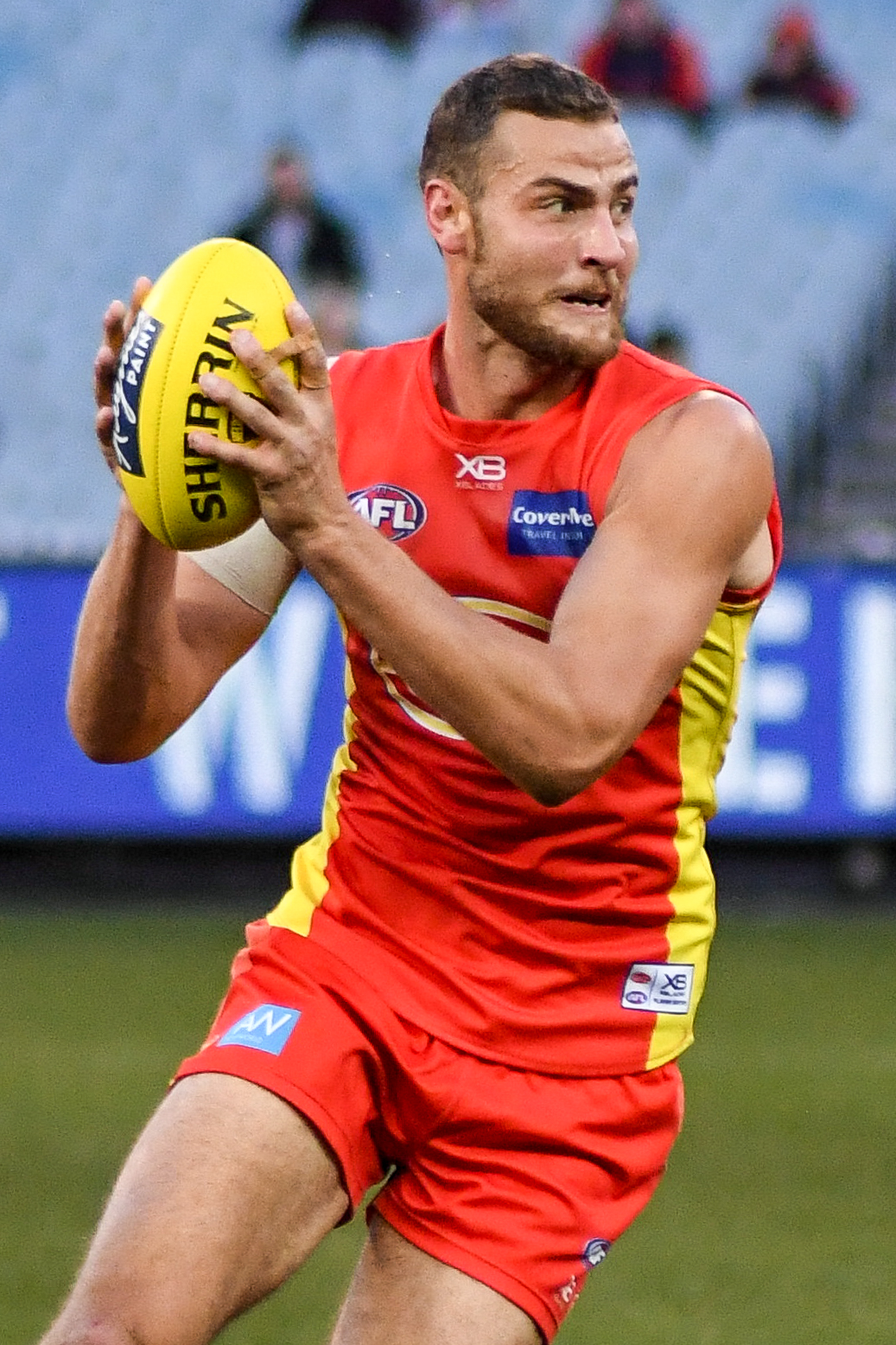
Jarrod Witts became a Gold Coast Suns Club Champion in 2019, and has been a co-captain between 2019 and 2024.

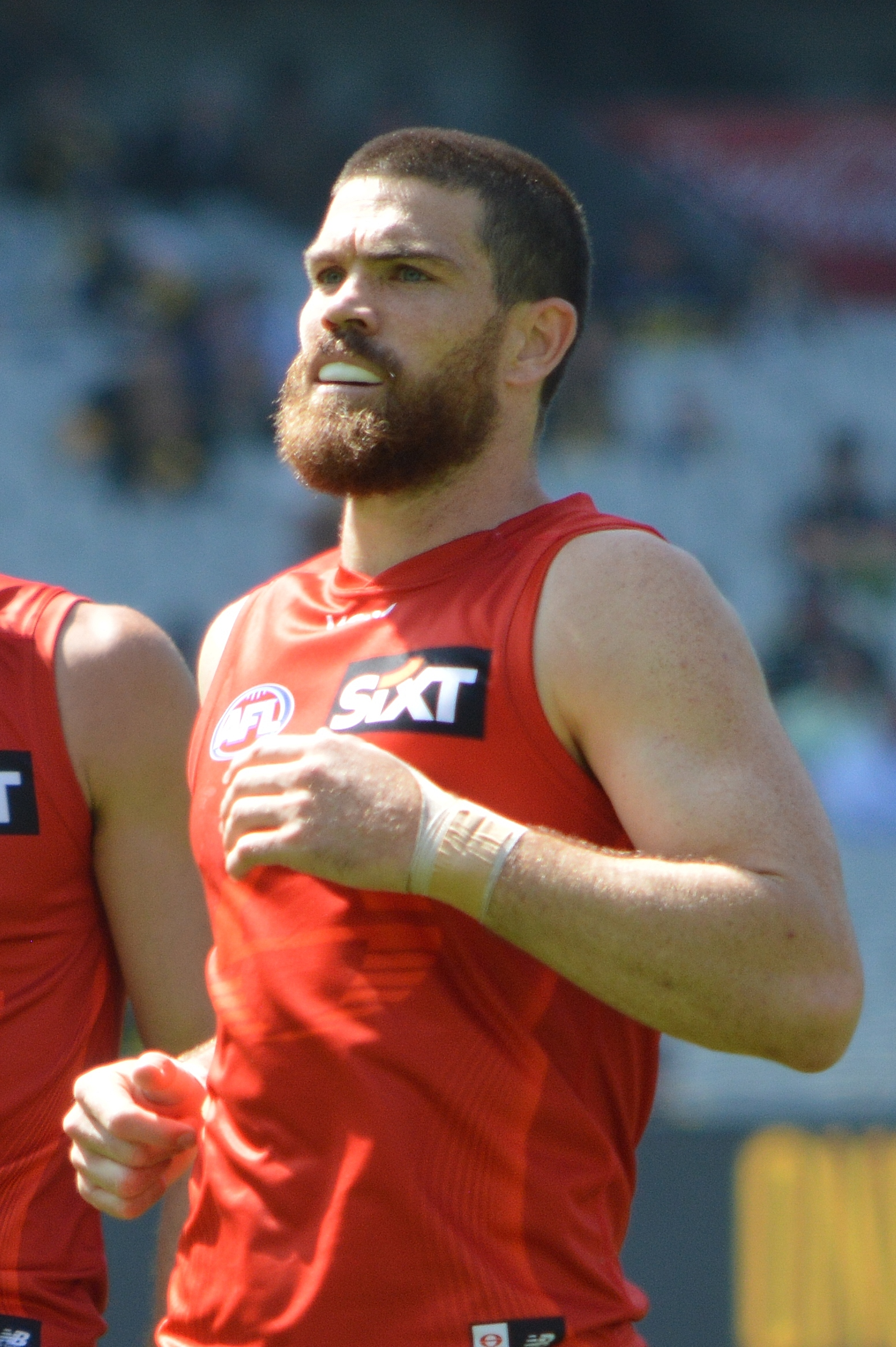
Sam Collins is a two-time Club Champion.

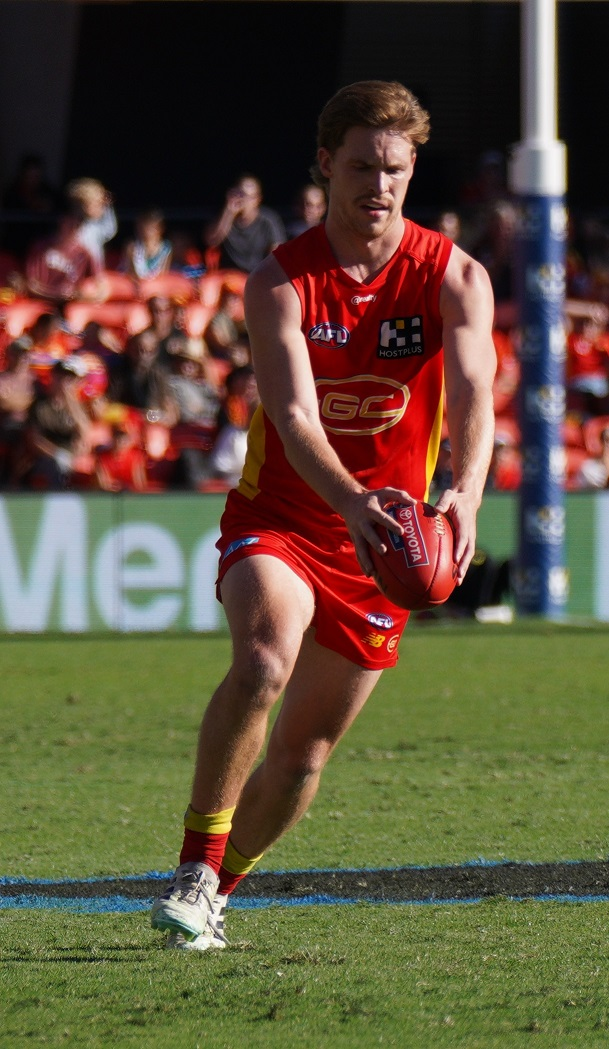
Noah Anderson was Gold Coast's Club Champion in 2023, and has been captain since 2025.

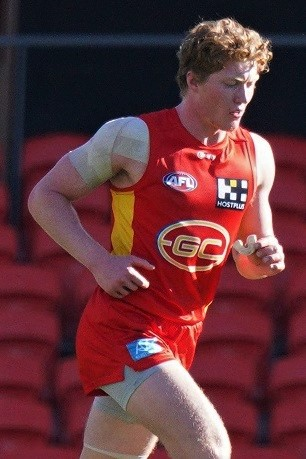
Matt Rowell was the number one pick in the 2019 national draft.

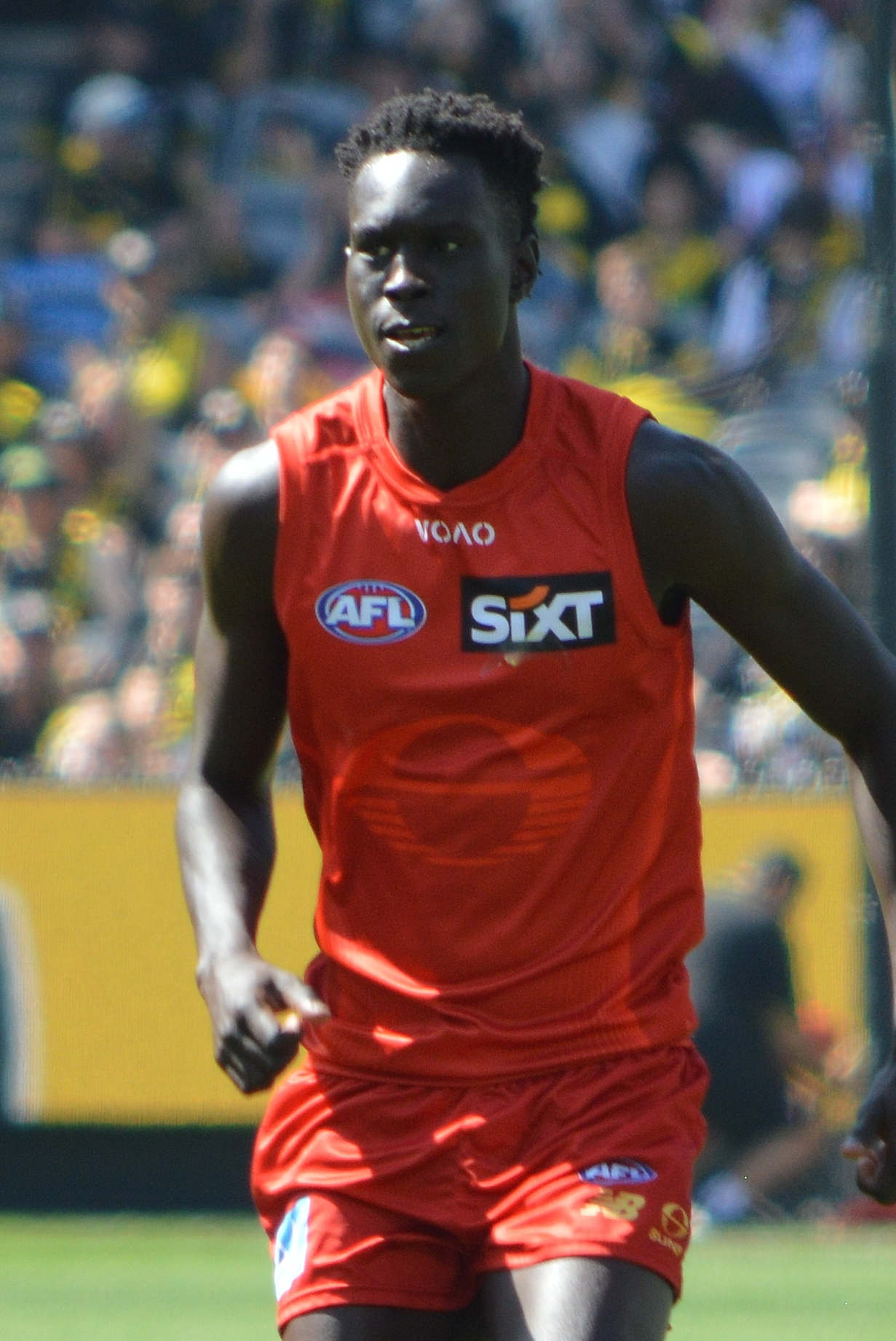
Mac Andrew kicked a goal after the siren to beat Essendon in round 22, 2024.

Table headers and key
Order	Players are listed according to the date of their debut for the club.
Seasons	The yearspan of the player's appearances for Gold Coast.
Debut	Players' first premiership match for Gold Coast.
Games	The number of games played.
Goals	The number of goals scored.
†	Inducted into the Australian Football Hall of Fame.
^{^}	Player is currently on Gold Coast's playing list.
Statistics are updated to the end of 2025.

=== 2010s ===
Order	Name	Season(s)	Debut	Games	Goals
1	Gary Ablett Jr. †	2011–2017	round 2, 2011	110	124
2	Harley Bennell	2011–2015	round 2, 2011	81	92
3	Nathan Bock	2011–2014	round 2, 2011	27	6
4	Jared Brennan	2011–2013	round 2, 2011	54	26
5	Campbell Brown	2011–2013	round 2, 2011	46	45
6	Charlie Dixon	2011–2015	round 2, 2011	65	94
7	Josh Fraser	2011–2012	round 2, 2011	18	12
8	Jarrod Harbrow	2011–2021	round 2, 2011	192	33
9	Daniel Harris	2011	round 2, 2011	11	2
10	Karmichael Hunt	2011–2014	round 2, 2011	44	6
11	Nathan Krakouer	2011	round 2, 2011	13	8
12	Marc Lock	2011	round 2, 2011	1	0
13	Alik Magin	2011–2012	round 2, 2011	8	3
14	Brandon Matera	2011–2017	round 2, 2011	101	124
15	Trent McKenzie	2011–2017	round 2, 2011	106	22
16	Dion Prestia	2011–2016	round 2, 2011	95	30
17	Michael Rischitelli	2011–2018	round 2, 2011	125	42
18	Zac Smith	2011–2015	round 2, 2011	65	31
19	Danny Stanley	2011–2016	round 2, 2011	83	39
20	David Swallow	2011–2025	round 2, 2011	249	111
21	Seb Tape	2011–2016	round 2, 2011	40	1
22	Josh Toy	2011–2012	round 2, 2011	13	1
23	Michael Coad	2011–2012	round 3, 2011	6	0
24	Daniel Gorringe	2011–2015	round 3, 2011	22	7
25	Maverick Weller	2011–2013	round 3, 2011	32	3
26	Luke Russell	2011–2016	round 4, 2011	73	29
27	Matt Shaw	2011–2017	round 4, 2011	102	33
28	Jack Hutchins	2011–2014	round 5, 2011	19	3
29	Sam Iles	2011–2012	round 5, 2011	26	11
30	Steven May	2011–2018	round 6, 2011	123	21
31	Liam Patrick	2011–2013	round 6, 2011	13	6
32	Sam Day	2011–2024	round 7, 2011	152	111
33	Joseph Daye	2011	round 7, 2011	4	1
34	Tom Lynch	2011–2018	round 7, 2011	131	254
35	Tom Nicholls	2011–2016	round 8, 2011	45	7
36	Taylor Hine	2011–2012	round 11, 2011	9	1
37	Rex Liddy	2011	round 12, 2011	4	0
38	Hayden Jolly	2011–2012	round 14, 2011	6	0
39	Joel Wilkinson	2011–2013	round 14, 2011	26	1
40	Rory Thompson	2011–2018	round 16, 2011	103	7
41	Jeremy Taylor	2011–2014	round 19, 2011	10	1
42	Nathan Ablett	2011	round 22, 2011	2	1
43	Tom Hickey	2011–2012	round 22, 2011	12	5
44	Joel Tippett	2011	round 22, 2011	2	0
45	Josh Caddy	2011–2012	round 23, 2011	24	17
46	Jacob Gillbee	2011–2013	round 24, 2011	6	3
47	Aaron Hall	2012–2018	round 1, 2012	103	76
48	Matthew Warnock	2012–2014	round 1, 2012	32	0
49	Kyal Horsley	2012–2013	round 5, 2012	14	3
50	Andrew McQualter	2012	round 8, 2012	5	2
51	Alex Sexton	2012–2025	round 8, 2012	186	164
52	Josh Hall	2012–2015	round 16, 2012	7	3
53	Jackson Allen	2012–2014	round 20, 2012	4	0
54	Piers Flanagan	2012	round 21, 2012	3	0
55	Greg Broughton	2013–2015	round 1, 2013	42	4
56	Tom Murphy	2013–2014	round 1, 2013	18	0
57	Jaeger O'Meara	2013–2016	round 1, 2013	44	27
58	Jesse Lonergan	2013–2018	round 6, 2013	60	7
59	Tim Sumner	2013–2015	round 10, 2013	17	6
60	Andrew Boston	2013–2015	round 14, 2013	16	10
61	Leigh Osborne	2013	round 22, 2013	1	0
62	Clay Cameron	2014–2016	round 1, 2014	23	5
63	Sean Lemmens	2014–2025	round 1, 2014	149	25
64	Jack Martin	2014–2019	round 1, 2014	85	75
65	Kade Kolodjashnij	2014–2018	round 2, 2014	78	13
66	Louis Herbert	2014–2015	round 18, 2014	3	0
67	Jack Leslie	2014–2018	round 22, 2014	28	1
68	Jarrod Garlett	2015–2016	round 1, 2015	17	10
69	Mitch Hallahan	2015–2017	round 1, 2015	20	5
70	Nick Malceski	2015–2016	round 1, 2015	34	8
71	Touk Miller^	2015–	round 1, 2015	214	71
72	Adam Saad	2015–2017	round 1, 2015	48	3
73	Josh Glenn	2015	round 5, 2015	5	1
74	Henry Schade	2015–2016	round 6, 2015	20	0
75	Andrew Raines	2015	round 6, 2015	6	2
76	Keegan Brooksby	2015–2017	round 9, 2015	14	3
77	Peter Wright	2015–2019	round 10, 2015	63	85
78	Callum Ah Chee	2016–2019	round 1, 2016	45	24
79	Ryan Davis	2016–2017	round 1, 2016	21	15
80	Matt Rosa	2016–2018	round 1, 2016	39	6
81	Daniel Currie	2016–2017	round 5, 2016	6	3
82	Jarrad Grant	2016–2017	round 5, 2016	14	11
83	Mackenzie Willis	2016–2017	round 6, 2016	5	0
84	Darcy Macpherson	2016–	round 7, 2016	97	29
85	Jesse Joyce	2016–2020	round 11, 2016	64	2
86	Josh Schoenfeld	2016–2019	round 18, 2016	14	5
87	Brayden Fiorini	2016–2025	round 22, 2016	123	41
88	Ben Ainsworth	2017–2025	round 1, 2017	158	137
89	Michael Barlow	2017–2018	round 1, 2017	15	11
90	Jack Bowes	2017–2022	round 1, 2017	83	14
91	Pearce Hanley	2017–2020	round 1, 2017	40	2
92	Jarryd Lyons	2017–2018	round 1, 2017	37	17
93	Jarrod Witts^	2017–	round 1, 2017	165	27
94	Brad Scheer	2017–2018	round 7, 2017	13	2
95	Will Brodie	2017–2021	round 10, 2017	25	3
96	Jack Scrimshaw	2017–2017	round 18, 2017	4	0
97	Max Spencer	2017–2018	round 19, 2017	8	0
98	Nick Holman^	2018–	round 1, 2018	138	78
99	Lachie Weller^	2018–	round 1, 2018	114	33
100	Aaron Young	2018–2019	round 1, 2018	24	21
101	Charlie Ballard^	2018–	round 7, 2018	134	3
102	Brayden Crossley	2018–2019	round 7, 2018	10	5
103	Jacob Heron	2018–2019	round 9, 2018	13	2
104	Jacob Dawson	2018–2019	round 14, 2018	9	1
105	Wil Powell^	2018–	round 15, 2018	130	16
106	Chris Burgess	2019–2023	round 1, 2019	36	14
107	Sam Collins^	2019–	round 1, 2019	135	0
108	Jack Hombsch	2019	round 1, 2019	18	0
109	George Horlin-Smith	2019	round 1, 2019	7	2
110	Jack Lukosius	2019–2024	round 1, 2019	116	79
111	Anthony Miles	2019	round 1, 2019	17	6
112	Jordan Murdoch	2019	round 1, 2019	14	1
113	Josh Corbett	2019	round 6, 2019	9	3
114	Ben King^	2019–	round 9, 2019	120	255
115	Corey Ellis	2019	round 13, 2019	4	0
116	Caleb Graham	2019–2022	round 21, 2019	37	1

=== 2020s ===
Order	Name	Season(s)	Debut	Games	Goals
117	Noah Anderson^	2020–	round 1, 2020	129	54
118	Connor Budarick	2020–2025	round 1, 2020	55	7
119	Brandon Ellis	2020–2024	round 1, 2020	75	27
120	Hugh Greenwood	2020–2021	round 1, 2020	32	9
121	Matt Rowell^	2020–	round 1, 2020	110	35
122	Izak Rankine	2020–2022	round 6, 2020	48	57
123	Jeremy Sharp	2020–2022	round 10, 2020	23	7
124	Sam Flanders	2020–2025	round 11, 2020	89	37
125	Jy Farrar^	2020–	round 18, 2020	42	13
126	Oleg Markov	2021–2022	round 1, 2021	28	2
127	Rory Atkins	2021–2024	round 9, 2021	37	5
128	Malcolm Rosas	2021–2025	round 9, 2021	49	46
129	Joel Jeffrey^	2021–	round 20, 2021	53	21
130	Jacob Townsend	2021	round 21, 2021	2	3
131	Alex Davies^	2021–	round 23, 2021	40	12
132	Levi Casboult	2022–2024	round 1, 2022	44	59
133	Mabior Chol	2022–2023	round 1, 2022	30	54
134	Charlie Constable	2022–2023	round 11, 2022	4	0
135	Hewago Oea	2022–2024	round 16, 2022	13	5
136	James Tsitas	2022–2024	round 16, 2022	5	4
137	Elijah Hollands	2022–2023	round 19, 2022	14	8
138	Mac Andrew^	2022–	round 20, 2022	65	12
139	Ben Long^	2023–	round 1, 2023	56	71
140	Bodhi Uwland^	2023–	round 1, 2023	49	1
141	Bailey Humphrey^	2023–	round 4, 2023	63	50
142	Ned Moyle^	2023–	round 4, 2023	13	2
143	Tom Berry	2023–2025	round 8, 2023	23	3
144	Lloyd Johnston	2023–2025	round 23, 2023	9	3
145	Jed Walter^	2024–	round 2, 2024	30	29
146	Sam Clohesy^	2024–	round 4, 2024	34	10
147	Will Graham^	2024–	round 4, 2024	25	18
148	Ethan Read^	2024–	round 4, 2024	25	22
149	Jake Rogers^	2024–	round 6, 2024	18	6
150	John Noble^	2025–	round 1, 2025	25	3
151	Daniel Rioli^	2025–	round 1, 2025	20	8
152	Leo Lombard^	2025–	round 12, 2025	4	1
153	Oscar Adams^	2025–	round 17, 2025	8	0
154	Ben Jepson^	2025–	round 19, 2025	1	0
155	Lachie Gulbin^	2025–	round 24, 2025	1	0
156	Christian Petracca^	2026–	round 0, 2026	10	16
157	Zeke Uwland^	2026–	round 0, 2026	9	5
158	Jamarra Ugle-Hagan^	2026–	round 7, 2026	3	4
159	Jai Murray^	2026–	round 13, 2026	1	0
160	Beau Addinsall^	2026–	round 15, 2026	1	0
161	Dylan Patterson^	2026–	round 17, 2026	1	0

== AFL Women's players ==
Table headers and key
Order	Players are listed according to the date of their debut for the club.
Seasons	The yearspan of the player's appearances for Gold Coast.
Debut	Players' first premiership match for Gold Coast.
Games	The number of games played.
Goals	The number of goals scored.
^{^}	Player is currently on Gold Coast's playing list.
Statistics are updated to round one, 2026.

=== 2020s ===
Order	Name	Season(s)	Debut	Games	Goals
1	Lauren Ahrens	2020–2023	round 1, 2020	47	1
2	Lauren Bella	2020–2025	round 1, 2020	66	1
3	Hannah Dunn	2020–2022 (S6)	round 1, 2020	24	0
4	Tiarna Ernst	2020	round 1, 2020	7	1
5	Cheyenne Hammond	2020–2022	round 1, 2020	22	1
6	Lexi Hamilton	2020	round 1, 2020	1	0
7	Dee Heslop	2020–2022	round 1, 2020	23	0
8	Jasmyn Hewett	2020–2021	round 1, 2020	6	0
9	Jordann Hickey	2020–2021	round 1, 2020	9	1
10	Kalinda Howarth	2020–2023	round 1, 2020	35	20
11	Leah Kaslar	2020–2021	round 1, 2020	15	3
12	Paige Parker	2020–2021	round 1, 2020	13	2
13	Brittany Perry	2020–2022 (S6)	round 1, 2020	14	4
14	Jade Pregelj	2020–2022 (S7)	round 1, 2020	19	0
15	Sally Riley	2020–2021	round 1, 2020	9	0
16	Molly Ritson	2020–2021	round 1, 2020	9	0
17	Jamie Stanton^	2020–	round 1, 2020	55	34
18	Kate Surman	2020–2022 (S6)	round 1, 2020	26	9
19	Sam Virgo	2020–2021	round 1, 2020	14	3
20	Serene Watson	2020–2022 (S7)	round 1, 2020	33	0
21	Jacqui Yorston	2020–2022 (S6)	round 1, 2020	15	2
22	Ellie Hampson	2020–2022 (S7)	round 2, 2020	23	5
23	Tayla Thorn	2020	round 3, 2020	3	0
24	Tori Groves-Little	2020–2022 (S7)	round 5, 2020	11	4
25	Taylor Smith	2020	round 6, 2020	1	0
26	Annise Bradfield	2021–2022 (S7)	round 1, 2021	5	0
27	Daisy D'Arcy^	2021–	round 1, 2021	51	2
28	Alison Drennan	2021–2023	round 1, 2021	40	3
29	Elizabeth Keaney	2021–2023	round 1, 2021	39	1
30	Maddison Levi	2021	round 1, 2021	8	3
31	Sarah Perkins	2021–2022 (S6)	round 1, 2021	15	9
32	Lucy Single^	2021–	round 1, 2021	52	3
33	Georgia Bevan	2021	round 2, 2021	3	0
34	Janet Baird	2021–2022 (S6)	round 3, 2021	3	0
35	Wallis Randell	2021–2025	round 5, 2021	42	0
36	Emma Pittman	2021–2022 (S6)	round 8, 2021	2	0
37	Alana Barba	2022 (S6)	round 1, 2022 (S6)	2	0
38	Tara Bohanna	2022 (S6)–2024	round 1, 2022 (S6)	31	36
39	Jacqui Dupuy	2022 (S6)–2025	round 1, 2022 (S6)	49	37
40	Charlie Rowbottom^	2022 (S6)–	round 1, 2022 (S6)	52	4
41	Vivien Saad	2022 (S6)–2024	round 1, 2022 (S6)	27	0
42	Claudia Whitfort	2022 (S6)–2025	round 1, 2022 (S6)	43	8
43	Ashlee Atkins	2022 (S7)	round 1, 2022 (S7)	5	1
44	Georgia Clayden^	2022 (S7)–	round 1, 2022 (S7)	44	4
45	Tahlia Meyer	2022 (S7)–2023	round 1, 2022 (S7)	11	2
46	Claire Ransom	2022 (S7)–2023	round 1, 2022 (S7)	2	0
47	Jasmyn Smith	2022 (S7)–2023	round 1, 2022 (S7)	5	0
48	Giselle Davies	2022 (S7)–2023	round 2, 2022 (S7)	6	1
49	Courtney Jones	2022 (S7)	round 2, 2022 (S7)	9	8
50	Gabby Biedenweg-Webster	2022 (S7)–2023	round 4, 2022 (S7)	3	0
51	Kaylee Kimber	2022 (S7)–2023	round 8, 2022 (S7)	3	1
52	Krystal Scott	2022 (S7)	round 10, 2022 (S7)	1	0
53	Maddy Brancatisano^	2023–	round 1, 2023	29	1
54	Darcie Davies^	2023–	round 1, 2023	31	10
55	Clara Fitzpatrick^	2023–	round 1, 2023	27	1
56	Alana Gee	2023–2024	round 1, 2023	7	1
57	Meara Girvan^	2023–	round 1, 2023	30	3
58	Niamh McLaughlin^	2023–	round 1, 2023	34	6
59	Jordan Membrey	2023–2024	round 1, 2023	11	5
60	Cara McCrossan	2023–2024	round 3, 2023	6	0
61	Ella Maurer	2023–2025	round 5, 2023	23	2
62	Elise Barwick^	2023–	round 6, 2023	15	2
63	Kiara Bischa	2024–2025	round 1, 2024	18	0
64	Annabel Kievit^	2024–	round 1, 2024	24	3
65	Katie Lynch^	2024–	round 1, 2024	12	0
66	Ella Smith	2024–2025	round 1, 2024	16	3
67	Charlotte Wilson^	2024–	round 1, 2024	20	0
68	Lauren McConville	2024	round 3, 2024	3	0
69	Keely Fullerton	2024–2025	round 5, 2024	10	0
70	Taya Oliver	2024–2025	round 6, 2024	8	4
71	Havana Harris^	2025–	round 1, 2025	13	2
72	Tayla Gregory	2025	round 1, 2025	5	1
73	Lily Mithen^	2025–	round 1, 2025	13	0
74	Nyalli Milne^	2025–	round 1, 2025	4	1
75	Mia Salisbury^	2025–	round 1, 2025	12	0
76	Ellie Veerhuis^	2025–	round 1, 2025	11	0
77	Tara Harrington^	2025–	round 5, 2025	8	0
78	Sienna McMullen^	2025–	round 10, 2025	3	1
79	Dekota Baron^	2026–	round 1, 2026	1	0
80	Georja Davies^	2026–	round 1, 2026	1	0
81	Anne Hatchard^	2026–	round 1, 2026	1	0
82	Sunny Lappin^	2026–	round 1, 2026	1	0
83	Mikayla Nurse^	2026–	round 1, 2026	1	0
84	Bronte Parker^	2026–	round 1, 2026	1	0
85	Paige Price^	2026–	round 1, 2026	1	0
86	Lily Quigley^	2026–	round 1, 2026	1	0
87	Heidi Talbot^	2026–	round 1, 2026	1	0
88	Ava Usher^	2026–	round 1, 2026	1	0
89	Alannah Welsh^	2026–	round 1, 2026	1	0

== Other listed players ==
Table of listed players with no senior appearances for Gold Coast
Player	Date of birth	Acquired via	Listed		Ref.
Player	Date of birth	Acquired via	Rookie	Senior	Ref.
Roland Ah Chee	21 November 1990	No. 4, 2010 rookie draft	2011	—N/a	
Jake Crawford	5 March 1992	No. 82, 2011 rookie draft	2011	—N/a	
Lewis Moss	4 February 1992	2010 Queensland zone selection	2011–2012	—N/a	
Tyrone Downie	13 September 1988	No. 59, 2015 rookie draft	2015	—N/a	
Jarred Ellis	18 April 1995	No. 63, 2015 rookie draft	2015	—N/a	
Sam Fletcher	27 January 2000	2019 pre-season supplemental selection	2019–2020	—N/a	
Josh Jaska	26 February 1998	No. 2, 2018 rookie draft	2018	—N/a	
Tom Keough	10 October 1991	No. 3, 2016 rookie draft	2016	—N/a	
Cameron Loersch	20 October 1995	No. 53, 2016 rookie draft	2016–2017	—N/a	
Connor Nutting	9 October 1999	No. 55, 2017 national draft	—N/a	2018–2019	
Jack Stanlake	28 February 1991	Local talent access selection, 2010 national draft	—N/a	2011	
Jack Stanley	3 January 1990	Local talent access selection, 2011 rookie draft	2011	—N/a	
Harrison Wigg	16 October 1996	2017 trade from Adelaide	2019	2018	
Jez McLennan	7 September 2000	No. 23, 2018 national draft	2022	2019–2021	
Mitch Riordan	25 January 2000	No. 23, 2019 mid-season draft	2019–2020	—N/a	
Patrick Murtagh	11 February 2000	2020 Queensland Academy zone selection	2020–2022	—N/a	
Matt Conroy	7 November 2000	No. 29, 2020 rookie draft	2021–2022	—N/a	
Rhys Nicholls	30 September 2002	No. 40, 2021 rookie draft	—N/a	2021–2022	
Sandy Brock	14 December 2002	No. 36, 2022 rookie draft	2022–2024	—N/a	
Oskar Faulkhead	11 February 2003	No. 7, 2022 mid-season rookie draft	2022–2024	—N/a	
Jake Stein	17 January 1994	No. 23, 2022 rookie draft	2023	—N/a	
Jed Anderson	2 February 1994	2023 pre-season supplemental selection	—N/a	2023	
Brodie McLaughlin	20 November 1997	2023 pre-season supplemental selection	—N/a	2023	
William Rowlands	19 June 2005	No. 18, 2024 rookie draft	2024	—N/a	
Jack Mahony	12 November 2001	No. 24, 2024 rookie draft	2024	—N/a	
Elliott Himmelberg	4 June 1998	Unrestricted free agency	—N/a	2025–	
Cooper Bell	30 November 2006	No. 49, 2024 national draft	—N/a	2025–	
Max Knobel	27 June 2004	No. 4, 2024 rookie draft	2025–	—N/a	
Asher Eastham	13 May 2006	No. 17, 2024 rookie draft	2025–	—N/a	
Zak Evans	26 March 2000	Category B rookie selection	2025–	—N/a	
Caleb Lewis	29 September 2003	No. 14, 2025 mid-season rookie draft	2025–	—N/a	
Avery Thomas	20 September 2007	No. 28, 2025 national draft	—N/a	2026–	
Koby Coulson	31 July 2007	No. 46, 2025 national draft	—N/a	2026–	
