= Oliver Francou =

Personal information
- Born: 27 February 2006 (age 20)
- Original teams: North Adelaide (SANFL); Burleigh (QFA); Mosman (AFL Sydney)
- Draft: No. 3, 2026 mid-season draft
- Height: 184 cm (6 ft 0 in)
- Position: Midfielder

Club information
- Current club: West Coast
- Number: 50

Playing career^{1}
Years	Club	Games (Goals)
2026–	West Coast	4 (0)
- ^{1} Playing statistics correct to the end of 2026.

Oliver Francou (born 27 February 2006) is an Australian rules footballer who plays for the West Coast Eagles in the Australian Football League (AFL).

== Early life ==
Francou was born in Adelaide into a family of Greek descent. His father, Josh, was a professional Australian rules footballer who played 156 AFL games for Port Adelaide, finished runner-up in the Brownlow Medal in 2002 and won the Magarey Medal in 1996. Francou spent the early years of his life in Sydney while his father worked as an assistant coach for the Sydney Swans and Oliver began playing junior football for the Mosman Swans in the AFL Sydney junior leagues. In 2018, he moved to the Gold Coast when his father accepted an assistant coaching role with the Gold Coast Suns. While in Queensland, Francou played under-14 and under-16 junior football at the Burleigh Bombers alongside future AFL players Leo Lombard, Zeke Uwland, Jai Murray and Beau Addinsall. In 2022, Francou moved back to Adelaide and began playing junior football for North Adelaide and was overlooked as a father-son selection for Port Adelaide at the 2024 AFL draft and subsequently agreed to join their reserves team for the 2025 SANFL season. He returned to North Adelaide for the 2026 and caught the eye of AFL recruiters in the lead up to the mid-season draft.

== AFL career ==
Francou was drafted to the West Coast Eagles with pick 3 in the 2026 mid-season draft and made his AFL debut in round 17 of the 2026 AFL season.

== Statistics ==
Updated to the end of round 22, 2026.

Legend
G	Goals	K	Kicks	D	Disposals	T	Tackles
B	Behinds	H	Handballs	M	Marks

Season	Team	No.	Games	Totals							Averages (per game)							Votes
Season	Team	No.	Games	G	B	K	H	D	M	T	G	B	K	H	D	M	T	Votes
2026	West Coast	50	4	0	1	36	35	71	12	24	0.0	0.3	9.0	8.8	17.8	3.0	6.0	0
Career			4	0	1	36	35	71	12	24	0.0	0.3	9.0	8.8	17.8	3.0	6.0	0
