= Caleb Lewis =

Caleb Lewis may refer to:

- Caleb Lewis (playwright)
- Caleb Lewis (footballer)
