= All Saints Anglican School =

Location
- Highfield Drive; Gold Coast, Queensland, 4226; Australia

Information
- Type: Independent school, day and boarding
- Motto: Truth, Faith, Compassion
- Denomination: Anglican
- Established: 1987
- Principal: Matthew Corbett
- Gender: Co-educational
- Colours: Navy blue, light blue, beige and house uniforms
- Affiliation: Associated Private Schools
- Head of Junior School: Shelley Travers
- Head of Middle School: Todd Harm
- Head of Senior School: Bryn Evans
- Website: asas.qld.edu.au

All Saints Anglican School ("ASAS" or "All Saints") is a private, co-educational school located in Merrimac, Queensland, Australia. It was established in 1987 under the Aegis of the Anglican Diocese of Brisbane. The school is located on a 40-hectare campus in the Gold Coast Hinterland. All Saints is divided into three sub-schools: the Junior School (kindergarten to Year 6), the Middle School (years 7 to 9) and the Senior School (years 10 to 12). It has a total student body of approximately 1850 students. In 2012 All Saints celebrated its 25th year on 1 November (Foundation Day).

== Merrimac Campus ==
The school has two swimming pools, one indoor and one outdoor, both heated. It also has playing fields and sporting facilities including a three-storey health and physical education centre with a work-out room, indoor and outdoor basketball, tennis, hockey and volleyball courts and a golf course.

The campus has a multi-level science facility with a lecture theatre for over 200 students, a music centre and a theatre space consisting of the main theatre, seating 530 (the Nairn Theatre), a smaller theatre (the Dell'Arte), a full costume department and a green room. The Holloway Music Centre has two practice spaces for band and choral rehearsals, classrooms and sound-proof studios.

== House system ==
The Junior School consists of four different houses named after the dairy farms that were previously located near the School campus: Lyndon, Oakey, Talgai, and Clovelly.

The Middle and Senior Schools together have eight houses named after School Council Members: Fradgley, McIntosh, Day, Burling, Burchill, Reeves, Hobart, and Rapp.

A variety of activities are undertaken via house based competitions including swimming, athletics, cross country, chess, singing and public speaking.

== Notable alumni ==
=== Entertainment ===
- Ash Pollard (Radio & Television Personality)
- Cody Simpson (Singer)

=== Sport ===
Name	Sport	Top Level Team/Affiliation
Beau Addinsall	Australian rules football	Gold Coast
Will Ashcroft	Australian rules football	Brisbane
Levi Ashcroft	Australian rules football	Brisbane
Jack Bowes	Australian rules football	Gold Coast, Geelong
Koby Coulson	Australian rules football	Gold Coast
Alex Davies	Australian rules football	Gold Coast
Piers Flanagan	Australian rules football	Gold Coast
Lachie Gulbin	Australian rules football	Gold Coast
Taylor Hine	Australian rules football	Gold Coast
Steven Lawrence	Australian rules football	Brisbane, St Kilda
Tom Nicholls	Australian rules football	Gold Coast
Nick Riewoldt	Australian rules football	St Kilda
Joel Tippett	Australian rules football	Gold Coast, North Melbourne
Kurt Tippett	Australian rules football	Adelaide, Sydney
Bodhi Uwland	Australian rules football	Gold Coast
Zeke Uwland	Australian rules football	Gold Coast
Lachie Weller	Australian rules football	Fremantle, Gold Coast
Maverick Weller	Australian rules football	Gold Coast, St Kilda, Richmond
Kalani White	Australian rules football	Melbourne
Marc Woolnough	Australian rules football	Geelong
Andrew Symonds	Cricket	Australia
Amelie Sanders	Cycling	Australia
Megan Anderson	Mixed Martial Arts	Ultimate Fighting Championship
Broc Feeney	Motorsport	Supercars
Gretel Tippett	Netball	Australia
Ben Daley	Rugby union	Australia
Ben Grant	Rugby union	Waratahs
Sam Norton-Knight	Rugby union	Australia
Leah Davidson	Soccer	Australia
Thomas Oar	Soccer	Australia
Tameka Yallop	Soccer	Australia
Jade Neilsen	Swimming	Australia
Giaan Rooney	Swimming	Australia
Ashleigh Gentle	Triathlon	Australia

== ASAS International ==
The School has its own English Language Centre called International House. It gives international students the option to live either on campus in its boarding facility which houses 60 students, or in homestay accommodation while they complete short term English language courses or attend the school in mainstream classes.

== Extracurricular activities ==
All Saints offers a wide variety of extra-curricular activities including music, drama, choir and sporting activities. A variety of outdoor experiences are also offered at the School and participating students learn physical skills and leadership. As well, the School offers the Duke of Edinburgh's Award and holiday ski trips. Students may also participate in a number of language and cultural experiences and trips which are regularly undertaken to New Caledonia, France, Japan, China, Italy and Spain.

The Japanese Language Supplementary School of Queensland Japanese School of Gold Coast (Gōrudo Kōsuto Kō), a weekend Japanese school, holds its classes at All Saints. It maintains its school office in Surfers Paradise.

=== AFL Queensland Schools Cup Achievements ===
The AFL Queensland Schools Cup is the premier Australian Rules Football competition for schools in Queensland. The All Saints senior male team is coached by former Richmond, Brisbane and Gold Coast AFL player Andrew Raines.

==== Senior Male (Years 10–12) ====
- AFL Queensland Schools Cup

(bronze) Third Place: 2023
