= Jai Murray =

Australian rules footballer (born 2007)

Personal information
- Full name: Jai Murray
- Born: 9 March 2007 (age 19); Gold Coast, Queensland
- Original teams: Burleigh Bombers (QFA); Gold Coast Suns Academy (Talent League)
- Draft: No. 17, 2025 national draft
- Height: 187 cm (6 ft 2 in)
- Position: Midfielder

Club information
- Current club: Gold Coast
- Number: 35

Playing career^{1}
Years	Club	Games (Goals)
2026–	Gold Coast	9 (0)
- ^{1} Playing statistics correct to the end of round 22, 2026.

Career highlights
- Rising Star nominee: 2026

Jai Murray (born 9 March 2007) is a professional Australian rules footballer who was drafted to the Gold Coast Suns with pick 17 in the 2025 AFL draft.

== Early life ==
Murray was born and raised on the Gold Coast where he grew up playing junior rugby league for the Tugun Seahawks and junior Australian rules football for the Burleigh Bombers alongside future Gold Coast Suns teammates Zeke Uwland, Lachie Gulbin, Leo Lombard and Beau Addinsall. His father, Michael, was a national surf life saving board relay champion with the North Burleigh Surf Club and initially encouraged his son Jai to follow in his footsteps by competing in surf life saving events in the summer months at the North Burleigh Surf Club from the age of six and to also play rugby league at the Tugun Seahawks in the winter months, before his school friends encouraged him to play Australian rules football as well. He was instrumental in leading Palm Beach Currumbin State High School to their 2024 AFL Queensland State Championship win and was voted best on ground in the grand final.

Although Murray was prioritising rugby league at the time and was a state paddleboarding champion at the age of 12, he excelled in Australian rules football and competing in the under-12 national championships in Perth convinced him to commit to Australian rules football. He was invited to join the Gold Coast Suns Academy shortly after competing in the under-12 national championships. Murray was named in the under-15 and under-16 All-Australian teams in consecutive years to become an outstanding junior prospect leading into his draft year when he suffered a lisfranc injury to his foot that limited him to two games in his final year of junior football. He has stated that he is a lifelong Gold Coast Suns fan and has supported the club since it entered the AFL in 2011.

== AFL career ==
Murray was drafted to his hometown team, the Gold Coast Suns, with pick 17 in the 2025 AFL draft when the Suns matched a bid from the West Coast Eagles. He made his AFL debut in round 13 of the 2026 season against Brisbane in QClash 31. He earned a nomination for the AFL Rising Star award in 2026 just three games into his career following a 17-disposal performance against Hawthorn in round 15.

== Statistics ==
Updated to the end of round 22, 2026.

Legend
G	Goals	K	Kicks	D	Disposals	T	Tackles
B	Behinds	H	Handballs	M	Marks

Season	Team	No.	Games	Totals							Averages (per game)							Votes
Season	Team	No.	Games	G	B	K	H	D	M	T	G	B	K	H	D	M	T	Votes
2026	Gold Coast	35	9	0	2	78	47	125	34	15	0.0	0.2	8.7	5.2	13.9	3.8	1.7	0
Career			9	0	2	78	47	125	34	15	0.0	0.2	8.7	5.2	13.9	3.8	1.7	0
