= Burleigh Bombers Australian Football Club =

Burleigh Bombers

Names
- Full name: Burleigh Bombers Australian Rules Football Club
- Nickname: Bombers

Club details
- Founded: 1979
- Colours
- Competition: QFA Division 2 South
- Ground: Bill Godfrey Oval

Uniforms
Home

Other information
- Official website: burleighbombers.com

Burleigh Bombers Australian Rules Football Club, also known as the Burleigh Bombers, is an Australian rules football club representing the suburb of Burleigh Heads on the Gold Coast. The club currently competes in the second highest AFL Queensland league, QFA Division 2 of the AFL Queensland State League and its home ground is Bill Godfrey Oval.

== Premierships (5) ==
No.	Year	Competition	Opponent	Score	Venue
1	2001	AFLSQ Div 1	Wilston Grange Gorillas	16.6 (102) – 7.15 (57)	Yeronga
2	2004	AFLSQ Div 1	Palm Beach Currumbin Lions	10.7 (67) – 9.11 (65)	Broadbeach
3	2005	AFLSQ Div 1	Palm Beach Currumbin Lions	10.17 (77) – 10.15 (75)	Gabba
4	2021	QFA Div 2 South	Bond University Bullsharks	12.12 (84) – 7.9 (51)	Surfers Paradise
5	2023	QFA Div 2 South	Bond University Bullsharks	8.8 (56) – 15.6 (96)	Southport

== Drafted players in the AFL ==
Year	Name	Team	Draft №
2025	Zeke Uwland	Gold Coast	2nd
2025	Jai Murray	Gold Coast	17th
2025	Beau Addinsall	Gold Coast	18th

== Notable players (seniors and juniors) ==
- Andrew Lovett (Essendon)
- Brayden Crossley (Gold Coast)
- Jacob Dawson (Gold Coast)
- Lachie Gulbin (Gold Coast)
- Leo Lombard (Gold Coast)
- Bodhi Uwland (Gold Coast)
- Charlotte Hammans (Carlton and Gold Coast)
- Havana Harris (Gold Coast)
- Maddison Levi (Gold Coast)
- Teagan Levi (Gold Coast)
- Lucy Single (Gold Coast)
- Sienna McMullen (Gold Coast)
- Ava Usher (Gold Coast)
