= Bill Godfrey Oval =

Sports venue in Gold Coast, Australia

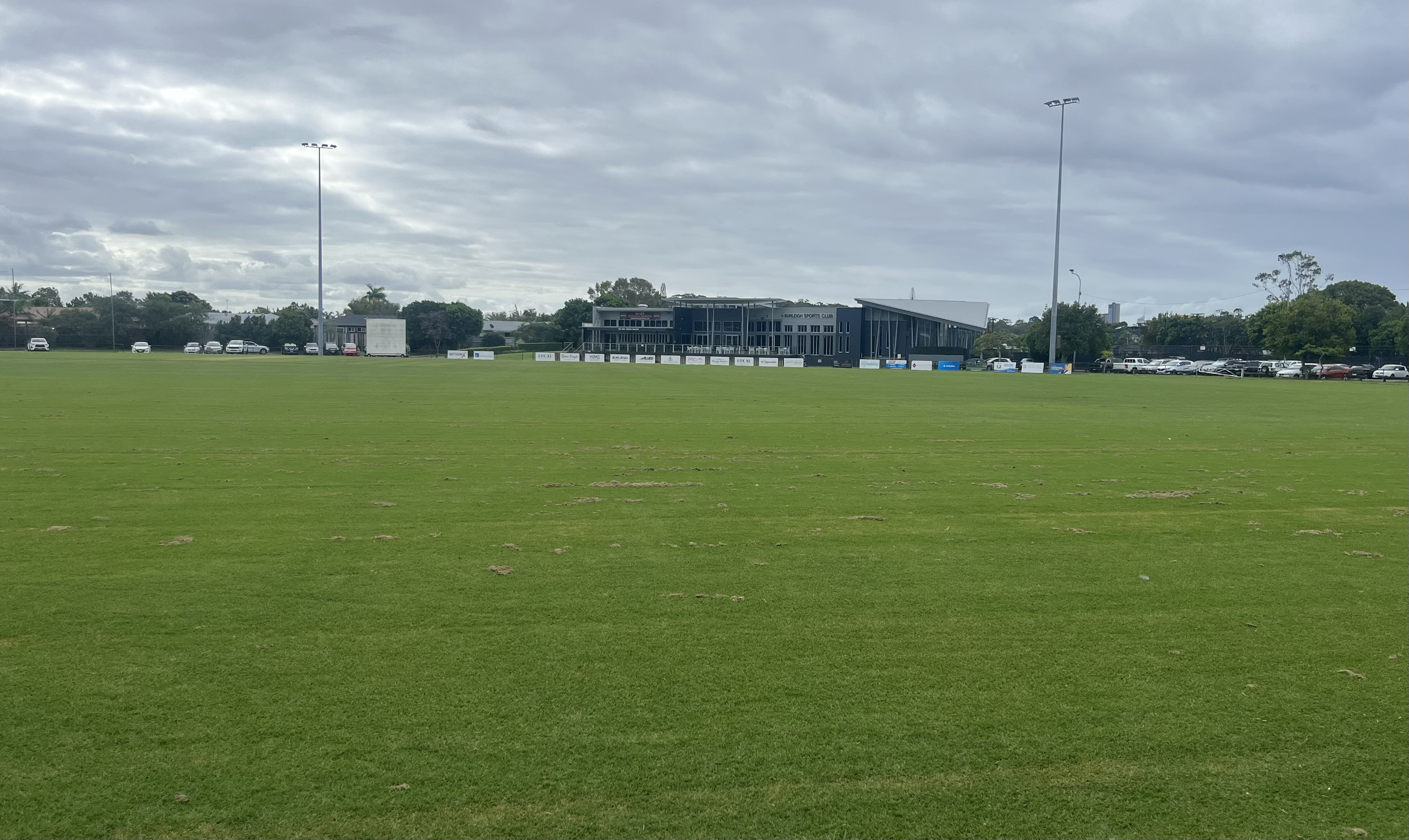
- Interactive map of Bill Godfrey Oval
- Location: Burleigh Waters, Queensland
- Coordinates: 28.0801°S 153.4320°E
- Owner: Gold Coast City Council
- Surface: Grass

Tenants
- Burleigh Bombers Football Club; Burleigh Cricket Club (2006–)

Bill Godfrey Oval (sometimes referred to as TW Godfrey Oval) is an Australian rules football and cricket venue located in the Gold Coast suburb of Burleigh Waters, Queensland. It is part of the John Handley Community Complex. It is the home of the Burleigh Bombers in the Queensland Football Association (QFA) and the Burleigh Cricket Club.

In 2022, the ground was upgraded. It includes five turf wickets and four synthetic cricket training nets.

Under naming rights, the ground is known as PRD Bill Godfrey Oval during the football season and Liberty Finance Oval during the cricket season.
