= Beau Addinsall =

Australian rules footballer (born 2007)

Personal information
- Full name: Beau Addinsall
- Born: 9 March 2007 (age 19); Gold Coast, Queensland
- Original teams: Burleigh Bombers (QFA); Gold Coast Suns Academy (Talent League)
- Draft: No. 18, 2025 national draft
- Height: 183 cm (6 ft 0 in)
- Position: Midfielder

Club information
- Current club: Gold Coast
- Number: 38

Playing career^{1}
Years	Club	Games (Goals)
2026–	Gold Coast	7 (2)
- ^{1} Playing statistics correct to the end of round 22, 2026.

Beau Addinsall (born 9 March 2007) is an professional Australian rules footballer who was drafted to the Gold Coast Suns with pick 18 in the 2025 AFL draft.

== Early life ==
Addinsall was raised on the Gold Coast where he attended All Saints Anglican School. He began playing junior Australian rules football for the Burleigh Bombers at the age of five alongside future Gold Coast Suns teammates Zeke Uwland, Jai Murray, Leo Lombard and Lachie Gulbin. Addinsall earned under-15 and under-16 All-Australian honours throughout his junior career and was selected to represent the Allies in the 2025 U18 National Championships. He joined the Gold Coast Suns Academy at 12 years of age and has stated that he is a lifelong supporter of the Suns.

== AFL career ==
Addinsall was drafted to his hometown team, the Gold Coast Suns, with pick 18 in the 2025 AFL draft when the Suns matched a bid from the West Coast Eagles. He will make his AFL debut in Round 15 of the 2026 season against Hawthorn.

== Statistics ==
Updated to the end of round 22, 2026.

Legend
G	Goals	K	Kicks	D	Disposals	T	Tackles
B	Behinds	H	Handballs	M	Marks

Season	Team	No.	Games	Totals							Averages (per game)							Votes
Season	Team	No.	Games	G	B	K	H	D	M	T	G	B	K	H	D	M	T	Votes
2026	Gold Coast	38	7	2	0	48	75	123	25	18	0.3	0.0	6.9	10.7	17.6	3.6	2.6	0
Career			7	2	0	48	75	123	25	18	0.3	0.0	6.9	10.7	17.6	3.6	2.6	0
