= Lucy Single =

Australian rules football player

- Single in November 2026

Personal information
- Full name: Lucy Single
- Born: 28 September 2002 (age 24); Gold Coast, Queensland
- Original teams: Bond University (QAFLW); Burleigh Bombettes (QFAW)
- Draft: No. 57, 2020 AFL Women's draft
- Height: 174 cm (5 ft 9 in)
- Position: Midfielder

Club information
- Current club: Gold Coast
- Number: 13

Playing career^{1}
Years	Club	Games (Goals)
2021–	Gold Coast	51 (3)
- ^{1} Playing statistics correct to the end of the 2025 season.

Career highlights
- Gold Coast co-captain 2025–

Lucy Single (born 28 September 2002) is an Australian rules footballer playing for Gold Coast in the AFL Women's competition (AFLW).

== Early life ==
Single was born on the Gold Coast to a Korean mother and a New Zealand father. She moved with her family to New Zealand as an infant where she played a number of sports including rugby as well as competing in karate competitions. Due to a lack of opportunities in New Zealand, she relocated back to the Gold Coast at the age of 10 and enrolled at Miami State High School. She was a member of the school's Rugby Sevens Excellence Program and competed in the Queensland Rugby Sevens State Championships multiple times, as well as captaining Miami to a win at the 2020 Queensland Rugby Sevens Schools Championship.

In 2016, Single joined Miami's inaugural Australian rules football team as a "joke" with her friends and went on to play an important role in the school's AFL Queensland State Championship win that year. In 2017, she signed up to play club football for the first time with the Burleigh Bombettes and was placed in the Gold Coast Suns' developmental academy. Single later switched clubs to play for Bond University in the top level QAFLW competition where she impressed scouts. As a result of her 2020 performances, she was drafted by the Gold Coast Suns with pick 57 in the 2020 AFL Women's draft.

== AFLW career ==
In November 2020, Single showcased her athleticism by winning the 2 km time trial in her first AFLW pre-season with a time of 7:11. She made her AFLW debut for the Suns in Round 1 of the 2021 AFLW season. It was revealed Single signed a two-year contract extension with Gold Coast on 10 June 2021.
