= Bodhi Uwland =

Australian rules footballer

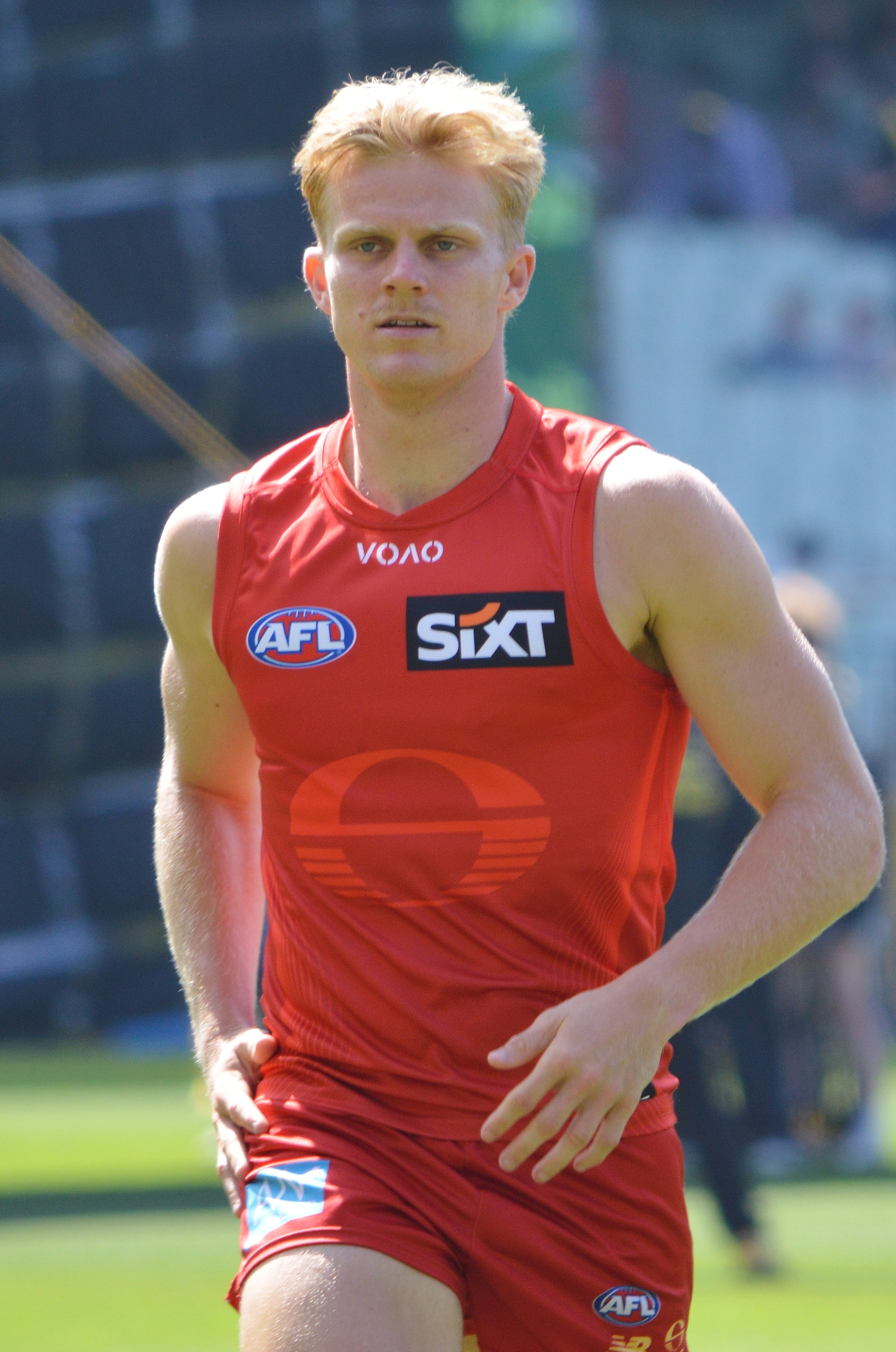
- Uwland in March 2026

Personal information
- Full name: Bodhi Uwland
- Nickname: Bob
- Born: 25 July 2003 (age 23); Gold Coast, Queensland
- Original teams: Gold Coast Suns Academy (Talent League); Broadbeach Cats (QAFL); Burleigh Bombers (QFA)
- Draft: No. 37, 2022 rookie draft
- Height: 188 cm (6 ft 2 in)
- Weight: 89 kg (196 lb)
- Position: Defender

Club information
- Current club: Gold Coast
- Number: 6

Playing career^{1}
Years	Club	Games (Goals)
2022–	Gold Coast	72 (2)
- ^{1} Playing statistics correct to the end of the 2026 season.

Career highlights
- Gold Coast Suns Club Champion: 2026; 2023 VFL Premiership player; 2024 Rising Star nominee

Bodhi Uwland is an Australian rules footballer who plays for the Gold Coast Football Club in the Australian Football League.

== Early life ==
Uwland was born and raised on the Gold Coast where he attended All Saints Anglican School throughout his younger years. He began playing junior football for the Burleigh Bombers in the Gold Coast under-6s competition and later switched clubs to play senior football for the Broadbeach Cats in the top tier QAFL state league.

Uwland joined the Gold Coast Suns Academy as a teenager and was considered a second to third round draft prospect prior to a back injury in his draft year. He was drafted by his hometown team with the 37th pick in the 2022 rookie draft.

== AFL career ==
Uwland spent his first season at the Suns in a back brace while recovering from a stress fracture that occurred in September 2021 and was required to wear the brace for 23 hours a day at times during his recovery. A year later, he made his AFL debut for Gold Coast at 19 years of age against the Sydney Swans at Carrara Stadium in round 1 of the 2023 AFL season.

In 2023, Uwland won Gold Coast's inaugural trophy with the VFL premiership, when his side defeated Werribee in the Grand Final. Uwland described the contest as a "very high standard of footy for the VFL". Uwland solidified a spot in the Suns' best 22 in 2024 and subsequently finished second in the club's best and fairest award that year.

In 2026, Uwland won his maiden Gold Coast Suns Club Champion award as the side's best and fairest player over the course of the 2026 season.

== Personal life ==
Uwland has stated he was a lifelong fan of the Gold Coast Suns prior to being drafted and was a foundation member of the club in their inaugural 2011 AFL season. His younger brother, Zeke, also plays football professionally for the Gold Coast Suns, and the pair first played together in round 1 of the 2026 AFL season.

He has Dutch heritage through his grandfather that fled the Netherlands for Australia due to World War II.

== Statistics ==
Updated to the end of the 2026 season.

Legend
G	Goals	K	Kicks	D	Disposals	T	Tackles
B	Behinds	H	Handballs	M	Marks

Season	Team	No.	Games	Totals							Averages (per game)							Votes
Season	Team	No.	Games	G	B	K	H	D	M	T	G	B	K	H	D	M	T	Votes
2022	Gold Coast	32	0	—	—	—	—	—	—	—	—	—	—	—	—	—	—	0
2023	Gold Coast	32	3	0	0	19	6	25	5	3	0.0	0.0	6.3	2.0	8.3	1.7	1.0	0
2024	Gold Coast	32	21	0	3	210	103	313	104	38	0.0	0.1	10.0	4.9	14.9	5.0	1.8	0
2025	Gold Coast	32	25	1	0	244	156	400	134	44	0.0	0.0	9.8	6.2	16.0	5.4	1.8	0
2026	Gold Coast	6	23	1	1	342	189	531	145	40	0.0	0.0	14.9	8.2	23.1	6.3	1.7	0
Career			72	2	4	815	454	1269	388	125	0.0	0.1	11.3	6.3	17.6	5.4	1.7	0
