= Ben Jepson =

Australian rules footballer (born 2001)

Personal information
- Born: 10 October 2001 (age 25)
- Original teams: Southport (VFL); Oakleigh Chargers (NAB League); Carey Grammar (APS)
- Draft: Pre-season supplementary signing, 2024 national draft
- Height: 184 cm (6 ft 0 in)
- Position: Midfielder

Club information
- Current club: Gold Coast
- Number: 44

Playing career^{1}
Years	Club	Games (Goals)
2025–	Gold Coast	5 (0)
- ^{1} Playing statistics correct to the end of round 22, 2026.

Ben Jepson (born 10 October 2001) is a professional Australian rules footballer playing for the Gold Coast Suns in the Australian Football League (AFL).

== Early life ==
Jepson was born in Melbourne and grew up playing junior football for the Camberwell Sharks in the Yarra Junior Football League. He attended Carey Baptist Grammar School with future Gold Coast teammates Noah Anderson and Matt Rowell, as well as Collingwood's Nick Daicos, throughout his schooling years and played alongside the trio for the Oakleigh Chargers in his final years of junior football. In 2020, he signed to play for Coburg in the VFL where he was a standout and was awarded the club best and fairest award in 2023. He made the decision to relocate to the Gold Coast in 2024, where he continued his VFL career with Southport and finished second in the club best and fairest award in his first year with the Sharks while working a day-time job at Somerset College. In November 2024, he was rewarded for his outstanding season at Southport with an invitation to train with the Gold Coast Suns during the 2025 pre-season Supplemental Selection Period (SSP).

== AFL career ==
In January 2025, Jepson was drafted to the Gold Coast with a Supplemental Selection Period (SSP) pick during the 2025 pre-season. He debuted for the Suns against the Adelaide Crows at the Adelaide Oval in round 19 of the 2025 AFL season.

== Statistics ==
Updated to the end of round 22, 2026.

Legend
G	Goals	K	Kicks	D	Disposals	T	Tackles
B	Behinds	H	Handballs	M	Marks

Season	Team	No.	Games	Totals							Averages (per game)							Votes
Season	Team	No.	Games	G	B	K	H	D	M	T	G	B	K	H	D	M	T	Votes
2025	Gold Coast	44	1	0	0	9	3	12	2	1	0.0	0.0	9.0	3.0	12.0	2.0	1.0	0
2026	Gold Coast	44	4	0	0	25	14	39	17	11	0.0	0.0	6.3	3.5	9.8	4.3	2.8	0
Career			5	0	0	34	17	51	19	12	0.0	0.0	6.8	3.4	10.2	3.8	2.4	0
