= Sam Clohesy =

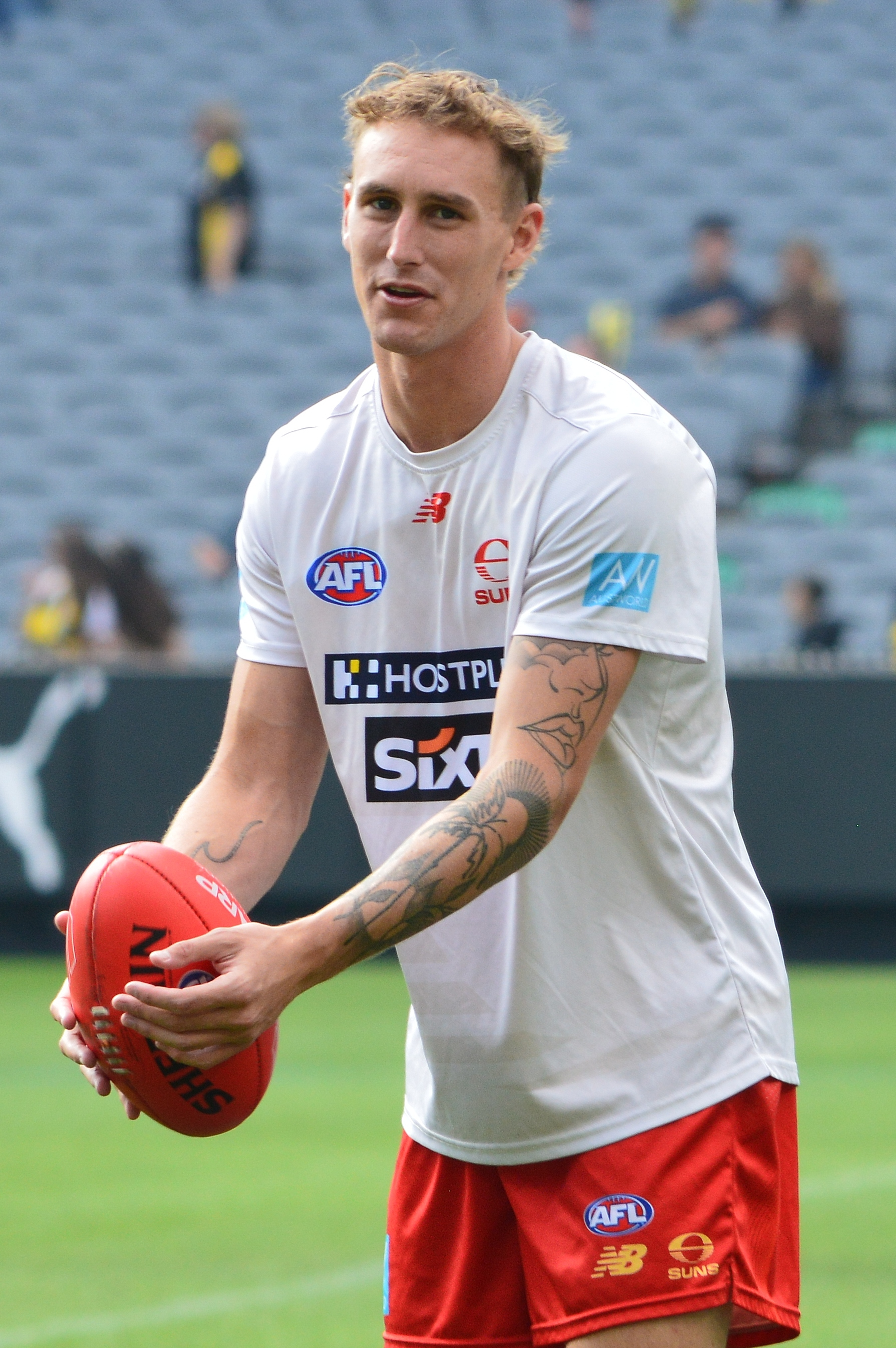
- Clohesy in March 2026

Personal information
- Full name: Sam Clohesy
- Born: 12 December 2002 (age 23)
- Original team: Werribee (VFL) / Calder Cannons (Talent League) / Gold Coast Suns Academy (Talent League) / Coolangatta (QFA)
- Draft: No. 4, 2024 rookie draft
- Height: 189 cm (6 ft 2 in)
- Position: Wing

Club information
- Current club: Gold Coast
- Number: 33

Playing career^{1}
Years	Club	Games (Goals)
2024–	Gold Coast	44 (12)
- ^{1} Playing statistics correct to the end of round 22, 2026.

Career highlights
- Fothergill–Round–Mitchell Medal (2023)

Sam Clohesy is a professional Australian rules footballer who was selected by the Gold Coast Suns with the fourth pick in the 2024 rookie draft.

== Early life ==
Clohesy spent the early years of his life in Geelong where he began his football journey at St Joseph's. His family on his mother's side is from South Africa. In 2016, his father accepted the role of head master at Mount Saint Patrick College and the family subsequently relocated 20km south of the Queensland-New South Wales border to the Northern Rivers region. Clohesy then began playing football for the Coolangatta Blues in the junior Gold Coast league and shortly after joined the Gold Coast Suns Academy for the following three years. His stint on the Gold Coast entailed multiple representative honours, which included representing the Suns at the U16 Academy Championships as well as Queensland at the U16 National Championships alongside future AFL teammate Alex Davies.

A year later he returned to Victoria with his family and began playing for the Calder Cannons in the Talent League in an attempt to further his chances of being drafted into the AFL. Clohesy went undrafted in 2020–21 and subsequently signed to play for Werribee in the VFL. He played a starring role in Werribee's run to the 2023 VFL Grand Final and was awarded the Fothergill–Round–Mitchell Medal for his outstanding season which culminated in Clohesy being rookie drafted by the Gold Coast Suns in November 2023.

His brother Ted Clohesy played for Geelong in the AFL.

== AFL career ==
Clohesy made his AFL debut for the Suns in round 4 of the 2024 season against the Greater Western Sydney Giants. He played 20 games in his first season and averaged an impressive 16.2 disposals. The emerging wingman signed an extension to his rookie contract until the end of 2026.

== Statistics ==
Updated to the end of round 22, 2026.

Legend
G	Goals	K	Kicks	D	Disposals	T	Tackles
B	Behinds	H	Handballs	M	Marks

Season	Team	No.	Games	Totals							Averages (per game)							Votes
Season	Team	No.	Games	G	B	K	H	D	M	T	G	B	K	H	D	M	T	Votes
2024	Gold Coast	33	20	6	1	204	119	323	83	47	0.3	0.1	10.2	6.0	16.2	4.2	2.4	0
2025	Gold Coast	33	14	4	7	125	89	214	51	34	0.3	0.5	8.9	6.4	15.3	3.6	2.4	0
2026	Gold Coast	33	10	2	4	87	75	162	42	30	0.2	0.4	8.7	7.5	16.2	4.2	3.0	0
Career			44	12	12	416	283	699	176	111	0.3	0.3	9.5	6.4	15.9	4.0	2.5	0
