= Dylan Patterson =

Australian rules footballer (born 2007)

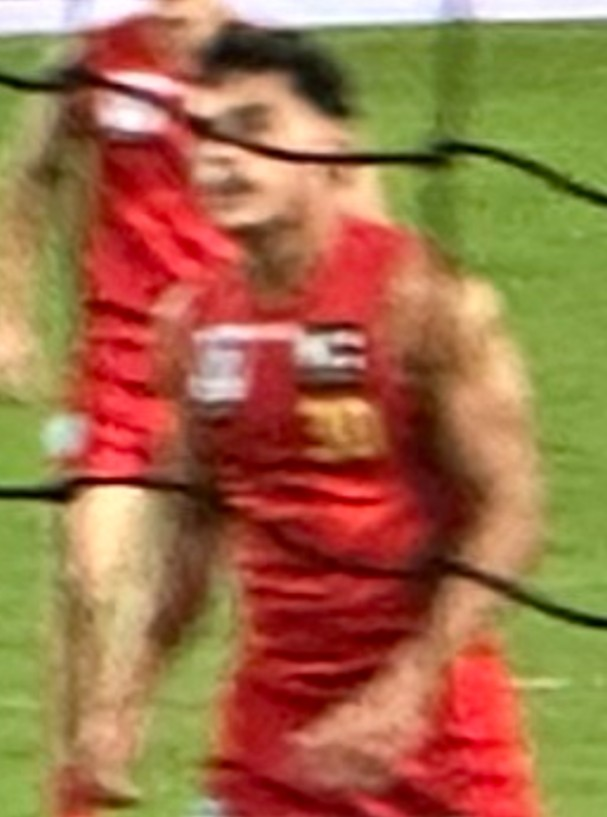
- Patterson in June 2026

Personal information
- Full name: Dylan Patterson
- Nickname: The Glitch
- Born: 1 September 2007 (age 19); Gatton, Queensland
- Original team: Palm Beach Currumbin (QAFL) / Gold Coast Suns Academy (Talent League)
- Draft: No. 5, 2025 national draft
- Height: 183 cm (6 ft 0 in)
- Position: Utility

Club information
- Current club: Gold Coast
- Number: 30

Playing career^{1}
Years	Club	Games (Goals)
2026–	Gold Coast	5 (3)
- ^{1} Playing statistics correct to the end of 2026.

Dylan Patterson (born 1 September 2007) is an Australian rules footballer who was drafted to the Gold Coast Suns with the fifth pick in the 2025 AFL draft.

== Early life ==
Patterson was born in the rural town of Gatton, Queensland to an Australian father and an Indonesian mother. It is believed that he is also of Indigenous Australian descent from his paternal grandfather, but his background has not yet been confirmed. Patterson spent the early years of his life in Gatton before relocating to Bribie Island for several years and ultimately settled on the Gold Coast where he attended renowned sporting school Palm Beach Currumbin State High School. He played the majority of his junior football at Palm Beach Currumbin and was placed in the Gold Coast Suns academy program at 13 years of age. Along with Australian rules football, Patterson also played junior rugby league at a high level and received contract offers from four professional NRL clubs as a 15-year-old, but would ultimately reject the offers to pursue a career as an AFL player.

In May 2023, a 15-year-old Patterson made his senior QAFL debut for Palm Beach Currumbin and was voted best on ground in his first game. He was also selected to participate in the 2023 Under-16 National Championships and was named in the All-Australian team for his eye-catching performances. In April 2024, at 16 years of age, he made his Coates Talent League debut against the Oakleigh Chargers and was named in the bests in a 57-point victory. In June 2024, still aged 16, Patterson made his VFL debut against Werribee. In April 2025, he was chosen to represent the AFL National Academy team against Richmond's VFL team and stunned onlookers with his skills and speed. Patterson was also selected to represent the Allies at the 2025 U18 National Championships and was named in the U18 All-Australian team at the conclusion of the tournament.

== AFL career ==
Patterson was drafted to the Gold Coast Suns with the fifth pick in the 2025 AFL draft.

== Statistics ==
Updated to the end of round 22, 2026.

Legend
G	Goals	K	Kicks	D	Disposals	T	Tackles
B	Behinds	H	Handballs	M	Marks

Season	Team	No.	Games	Totals							Averages (per game)							Votes
Season	Team	No.	Games	G	B	K	H	D	M	T	G	B	K	H	D	M	T	Votes
2026	Gold Coast	30	5	3	0	22	14	36	7	8	0.6	0.0	4.4	2.8	7.2	1.4	1.6	0
Career			5	3	0	22	14	36	7	8	0.6	0.0	4.4	2.8	7.2	1.4	1.6	0
