= Oscar Adams (footballer) =

Personal information
- Born: 23 July 2003 (age 23); Mount Gambier, South Australia
- Original teams: Glenelg (SANFL); South Gambier (LCFNL)
- Draft: No. 51, 2021 AFL draft No. 7, 2025 mid-season rookie draft
- Debut: Round 17, 2025, Gold Coast vs. Essendon, at Marvel Stadium
- Height: 198 cm (6 ft 6 in)
- Position: Key Defender

Club information
- Current club: Gold Coast
- Number: 48

Playing career^{1}
Years	Club	Games (Goals)
2022–2023	St Kilda	0 (0)
2025–	Gold Coast	21 (0)
- ^{1} Playing statistics correct to the end of round 22, 2026.

Oscar Adams (born 23 July 2003) is an Australian rules footballer who plays for the Gold Coast Suns in the Australian Football League (AFL), having previously been listed with the St Kilda Football Club.

== AFL career ==
Adams was selected by St Kilda with pick 51 of the 2021 AFL draft.

He was delisted by St Kilda at the end of the 2023 AFL season. He returned to Adelaide to play for Glenelg, where he was part of their 2024 premiership team.

Adams was subsequently selected by Gold Coast with pick 7 of the 2025 mid-season rookie draft. He made his debut in round 17 of the 2025 AFL season.

== Statistics ==
Updated to the end of round 22, 2026.

Legend
G	Goals	K	Kicks	D	Disposals	T	Tackles
B	Behinds	H	Handballs	M	Marks

Season	Team	No.	Games	Totals							Averages (per game)							Votes
Season	Team	No.	Games	G	B	K	H	D	M	T	G	B	K	H	D	M	T	Votes
2022	St Kilda	27	0	—	—	—	—	—	—	—	—	—	—	—	—	—	—	0
2023	St Kilda	27	0	—	—	—	—	—	—	—	—	—	—	—	—	—	—	0
2025	Gold Coast	48	8	0	0	32	22	54	19	8	0.0	0.0	4.0	2.8	6.8	2.4	1.0	0
2026	Gold Coast	48	13	0	0	57	72	129	48	18	0.0	0.0	4.4	5.5	9.9	3.7	1.4	0
Career			21	0	0	89	94	183	67	26	0.0	0.0	4.2	4.5	8.7	3.2	1.2	0
