= Zeke Uwland =

Australian rules footballer (born 2007)

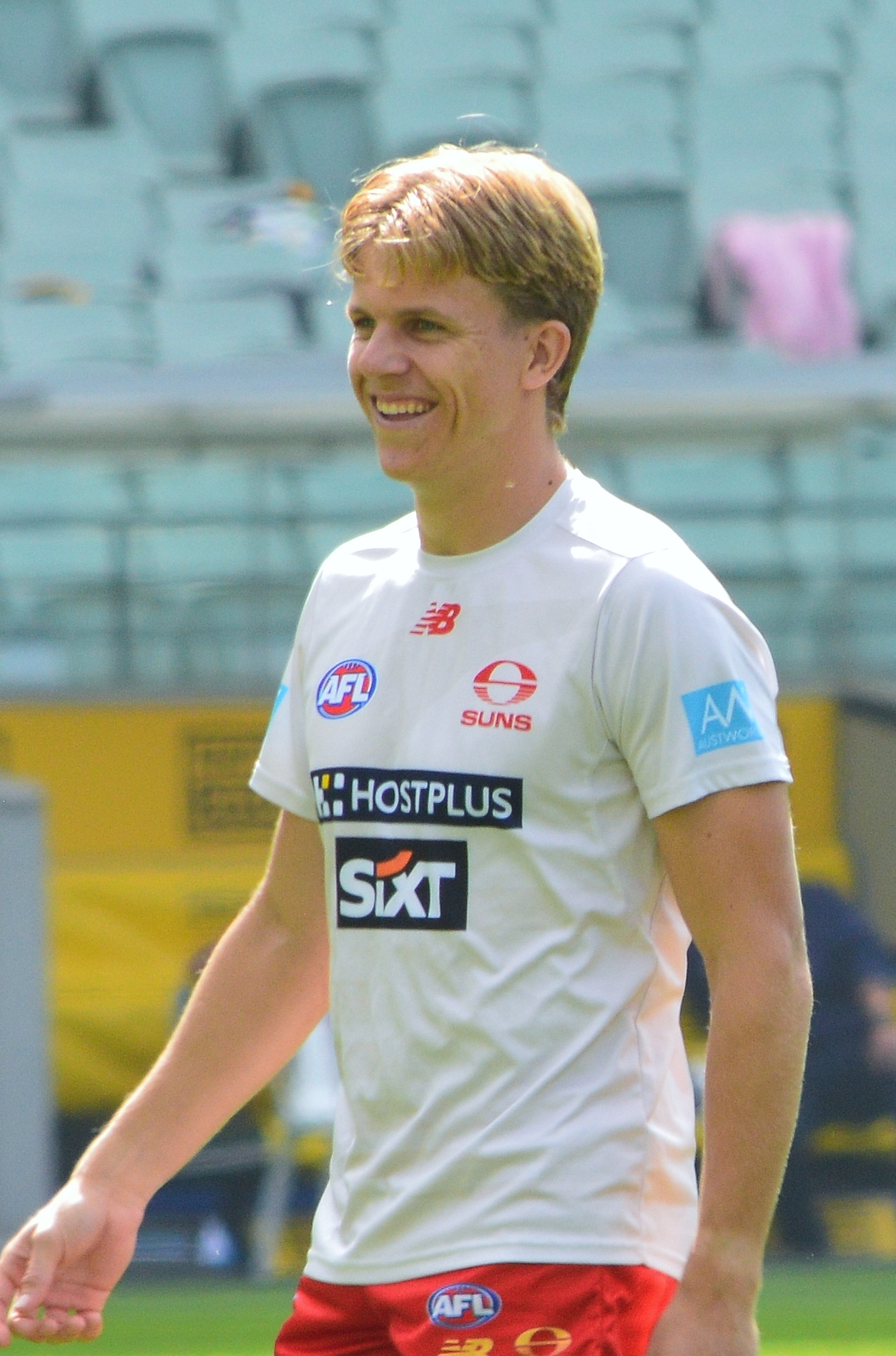
- Uwland in March 2026

Personal information
- Full name: Ezekiel Richard Uwland
- Nickname: Zeke the Freak
- Born: 24 April 2007 (age 19); Gold Coast, Queensland
- Original teams: Burleigh Bombers (QFA); Gold Coast Suns Academy (Talent League)
- Draft: No. 2, 2025 national draft
- Debut: Round 0, 2026, Gold Coast vs. Geelong, at Carrara Stadium
- Height: 180 cm (5 ft 11 in)
- Position: Defender / Midfielder

Club information
- Current club: Gold Coast
- Number: 32

Playing career^{1}
Years	Club	Games (Goals)
2026–	Gold Coast	17 (7)
- ^{1} Playing statistics correct to the end of round 22, 2026.

Career highlights
- Rising Star nominee: 2026

Zeke Uwland (born 24 April 2007) is a professional Australian rules footballer who was drafted to the Gold Coast Suns with pick 2 in the 2025 AFL draft.

== Early life ==
Uwland was born and raised on the Gold Coast where he attended All Saints Anglican School throughout his childhood. He is of Dutch descent and his grandfather moved from the Netherlands to Australia after World War II had concluded. Zeke's eldest brother, Bodhi, is also a professional footballer with the Gold Coast Suns. A foundation member and lifelong fan of the Gold Coast Suns, Uwland played junior football for the Burleigh Bombers and was invited to join the Gold Coast Suns Academy at the age of 12 years old. A month after his 16th birthday, Uwland made his senior debut for Burleigh and was voted best on ground in Burleigh's 2023 senior grand final winning team later that year while playing alongside his brother Jarrah and future Suns' teammate Lachie Gulbin. Uwland was also named in the 2023 U16 All Australian team after an outstanding national championships campaign.

In 2024, at 17 years of age, he made his VFL debut for the Gold Coast Suns and was later selected to represent the Allies as a bottom ager in the U18 National Championships where he excelled and was named in the U18 All Australian team at the conclusion of the tournament. He injured his back in late 2024 and missed the majority of the 2025 season but was still considered a top prospect amongst draft experts. Outside of football, Uwland is studying a law/commerce degree at Griffith University and works as a paralegal at a law firm on the Gold Coast.

== AFL career ==
Uwland was drafted to the Gold Coast Suns with pick 2 in the 2025 AFL draft. He made his AFL debut in the opening round match against Geelong at Carrara Stadium. Playing as a half-back, Uwland earned a nomination for the 2026 Rising Star award in round 17 when he had a personal best 32 disposals to go with a goal in the loss to Collingwood. He also received the first fine of his career during a brawl at half time of the match.

== Statistics ==
Updated to the end of round 22, 2026.

Legend
G	Goals	K	Kicks	D	Disposals	T	Tackles
B	Behinds	H	Handballs	M	Marks

Season	Team	No.	Games	Totals							Averages (per game)							Votes
Season	Team	No.	Games	G	B	K	H	D	M	T	G	B	K	H	D	M	T	Votes
2026	Gold Coast	32	17	7	6	159	103	262	65	22	0.4	0.4	9.4	6.1	15.4	3.8	1.3	0
Career			17	7	6	159	103	262	65	22	0.4	0.4	9.4	6.1	15.4	3.8	1.3	0
