= Caleb Lewis (footballer) =

Australian rules footballer (born 2003)

Personal information
- Full name: Caleb Lewis
- Born: 29 September 2003 (age 23)
- Original teams: Dingley Dingoes (SFNL); Sandringham Dragons (Talent League)
- Draft: No. 14, 2025 mid-season rookie draft
- Height: 198 cm (6 ft 6 in)
- Position: Key forward

Club information
- Current club: Gold Coast
- Number: 45

Playing career^{1}
Years	Club	Games (Goals)
2025–	Gold Coast	2 (0)
- ^{1} Playing statistics correct to the end of the 2026 season.

Caleb Lewis (born 29 September 2003) is an Australian rules footballer who plays for the Gold Coast Suns in the Australian Football League (AFL).

== Early life ==
Lewis was born in Melbourne and attended at Brighton Grammar School throughout his childhood where he served as the school's football vice captain under school captain and future Norm Smith Medal winner Will Ashcroft in 2021. He played junior football for the Sandringham Dragons and was undrafted at the 2021 AFL draft.

After several years playing in the VFL for Footscray and Casey, Lewis began playing with the Dingley Dingoes in the Southern Football Netball League and caught the attention of recruiters when he kicked 66 goals in 19 games for Dingley during the 2024 season. He was subsequently drafted by the Gold Coast Suns with the 14th pick in the 2025 mid-season rookie draft.

== AFL career ==
Lewis made his AFL debut for the Gold Coast Suns against the Western Bulldogs at Carrara Stadium in round 19 of 2026 season.

== Statistics ==
Updated to the end of 2026.

Legend
G	Goals	K	Kicks	D	Disposals	T	Tackles
B	Behinds	H	Handballs	M	Marks

Season	Team	No.	Games	Totals							Averages (per game)							Votes
Season	Team	No.	Games	G	B	K	H	D	M	T	G	B	K	H	D	M	T	Votes
2026	Gold Coast	45	2	0	1	4	1	5	3	4	0.0	0.5	2.0	0.5	2.5	1.5	2.0	0
Career			2	0	1	4	1	5	3	4	0.0	0.5	2.0	0.5	2.5	1.5	2.0	0
