= Lachie Gulbin =

Australian rules footballer (born 2006)

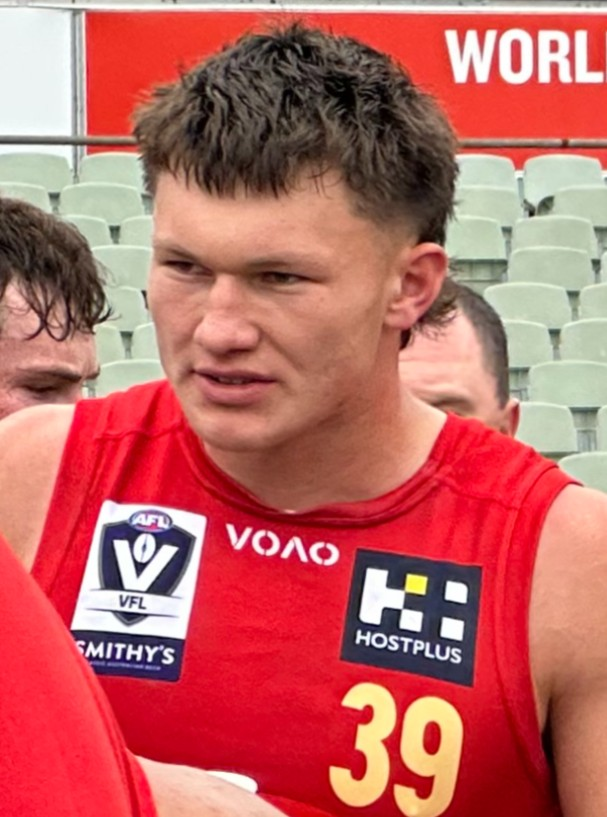
- Gulbin in July 2026

Personal information
- Full name: Lachlan Gulbin
- Born: 24 November 2006 (age 19)
- Original teams: Burleigh Bombers (QFA); Broadbeach Cats (QAFL); Gold Coast Suns Academy (Talent League)
- Draft: Category B rookie selection
- Debut: Round 24, 2025, Gold Coast vs. Port Adelaide, at Adelaide Oval
- Height: 187 cm (6 ft 2 in)
- Position: Forward

Club information
- Current club: Gold Coast
- Number: 39

Playing career^{1}
| Years | Club | Games (Goals) |
| 2025– | Gold Coast | 10 (4) |
- ^{1} Playing statistics correct to the end of round 22, 2026.

Lachlan Gulbin (born 24 November 2006) is a professional Australian rules footballer who was selected by the Gold Coast Suns with Category B rookie pick in the 2024 AFL draft.

== Early life ==
Gulbin was raised on the Gold Coast and attended All Saints Anglican School throughout his upbringing. He played junior football for the Burleigh Bombers and was invited to join the Gold Coast Suns Academy at the age of 12. Gulbin progressed his way through the junior ranks at Burleigh and played in their 2023 QFA Div II South senior premiership team at 16 years old alongside Zeke Uwland. He briefly switched to play for the Broadbeach Cats in 2024 in order to play top level QAFL state league football in the lead up to the upcoming national draft. Gulbin has stated that he grew up supporting the Gold Coast Suns.

== AFL career ==
Gulbin was drafted to his hometown AFL club, the Gold Coast Suns, at 17 years of age with a Category B rookie pick in the 2024 AFL draft. He made his AFL debut for the Suns in round 24 of the 2025 AFL season.

== Statistics ==
Updated to the end of round 22, 2026.

Legend
| G | Goals | K | Kicks | D | Disposals | T | Tackles |
| B | Behinds | H | Handballs | M | Marks |

| Season | Team | No. | Games | Totals | | | | | | | Averages (per game) | | | | | | | Votes |
| Season | Team | No. | Games | G | B | K | H | D | M | T | G | B | K | H | D | M | T | Votes |
|---|---|---|---|---|---|---|---|---|---|---|---|---|---|---|---|---|---|---|
| 2025 | Gold Coast | 39 | 1 | 0 | 0 | 6 | 3 | 9 | 4 | 5 | 0.0 | 0.0 | 6.0 | 3.0 | 9.0 | 4.0 | 5.0 | 0 |
| 2026 | Gold Coast | 39 | 9 | 4 | 4 | 46 | 50 | 96 | 23 | 20 | 0.4 | 0.4 | 5.1 | 5.6 | 10.7 | 2.6 | 2.2 | 0 |
| Career | | | 10 | 4 | 4 | 52 | 53 | 105 | 27 | 25 | 0.4 | 0.4 | 5.2 | 5.3 | 10.5 | 2.7 | 2.5 | 0 |
