= Leo Lombard =

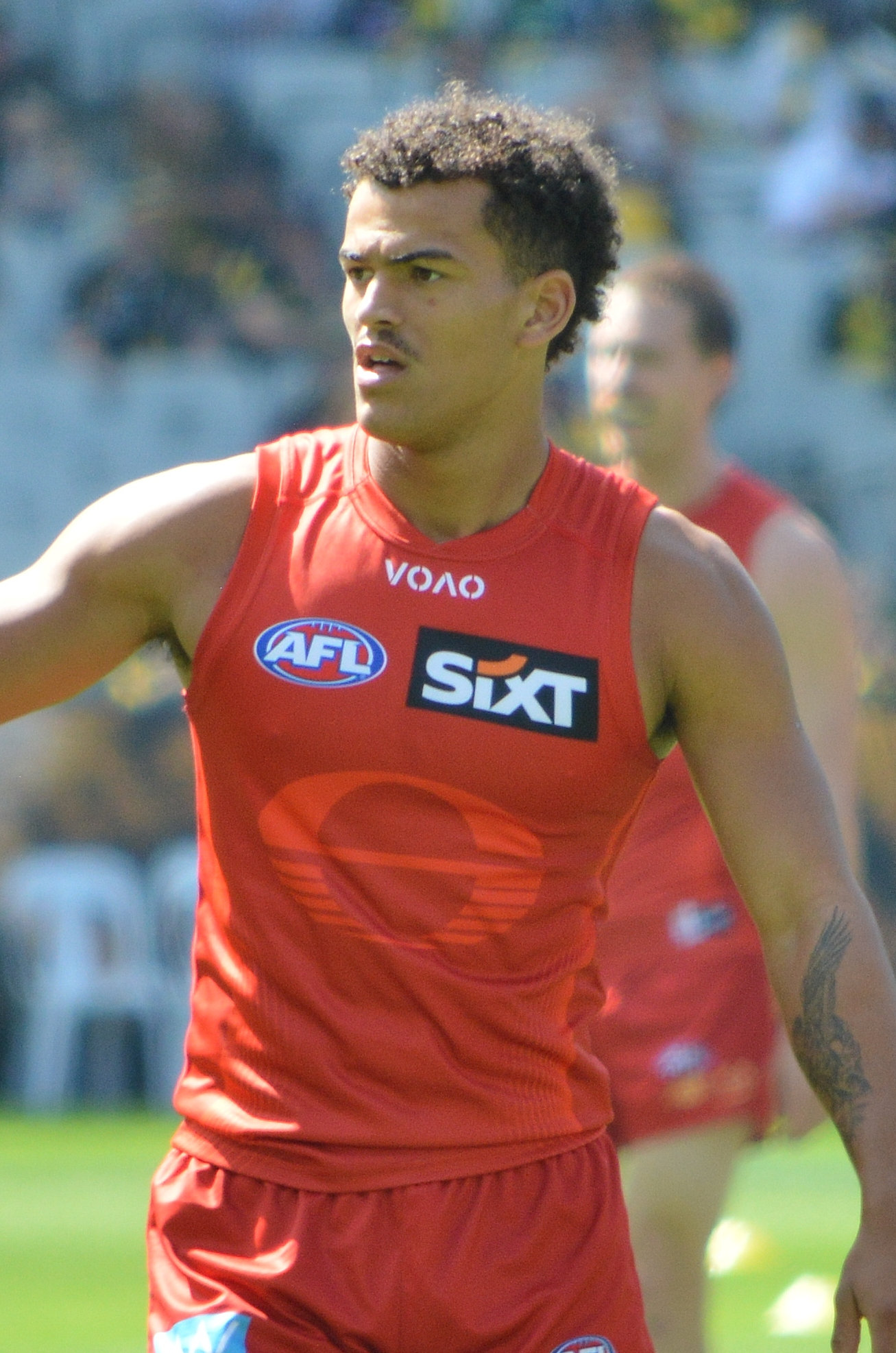
- Lombard in March 2026

Personal information
- Full name: Leonardo Lombard
- Born: 5 October 2006 (age 20); Gold Coast, Queensland
- Original teams: Broadbeach (QAFL); Gold Coast Suns Academy (Talent League); Burleigh Bombers (QFA)
- Draft: No. 9, 2024 National Draft
- Height: 178 cm (5 ft 10 in)
- Weight: 74 kg (163 lb)
- Position: Forward

Club information
- Current club: Gold Coast
- Number: 8

Playing career^{1}
| Years | Club | Games (Goals) |
| 2025– | Gold Coast | 27 (19) |
- ^{1} Playing statistics correct to the end of the 2026 season.

Career highlights
- AFL Rising Star nominee: 2026; VFL premiership player: 2023; Larke Medal: 2024

Leonardo Lombard (born 5 October 2006) is a professional Australian rules footballer who plays for the Gold Coast Suns. He was selected by the Suns with pick 9 in the 2024 National Draft.

== Early life ==
Lombard was born on the Gold Coast into a family with a Cuban father and an English mother. He attended Varsity College throughout his upbringing and took part in their ASPIRE AFL excellence program with future Suns teammate Jake Rogers. Lombard's father, Héctor, is a professional mixed martial artist who competed in the Ultimate Fighting Championship and formerly competed as an Olympic judoka who represented Cuba at the 2000 Sydney Olympics. His father introduced him to Brazilian jiu-jitsu at age six, and Lombard was considered a promising junior prospect years later when he claimed a gold medal at the Pan Pacific Championships in 2017 and was crowned the under-12 BJJ Australian Open champion in 2018. However, Lombard and his father later became estranged and no longer have a relationship, leaving his mother to raise him as a single parent, working three jobs to support the family.

Along with jiu-jitsu, Lombard began playing Australian rules football at eight years of age for the Burleigh Bombers. He performed well as a junior footballer, earning an invitation to join the Gold Coast Suns Academy by age 12. Lombard grew up supporting the Gold Coast Suns in the AFL. He later stated he initially only played football "for fun" on the side and was focused on pursuing a career in mixed martial arts, until the greater levels of development opportunities provided by the Suns Academy convinced him to quit Brazilian jiu-jitsu and chase a career in the AFL. Lombard progressed through the Gold Coast Suns Academy junior grades, earning representative honours along the way such as being selected in the 2022 U16 All-Australian team. In 2023, he was selected to represent the victorious Allies team as a bottom-age player in the U18 National Championships alongside future AFL teammates Jed Walter, Ethan Read, Jake Rogers and Will Graham. Lombard capped off his 2023 season by taking part in the Gold Coast's VFL premiership-winning side as a 16-year-old. He returned to the U18 National Championships a year later and was awarded the Larke Medal as the best-performed Division I player in the country, as well as earning selection in the starting U18 All-Australian team.

== AFL career ==
Lombard was drafted by his hometown AFL club, the Gold Coast Suns, after the club matched St Kilda's Pick No. 9 bid at the 2024 National Draft. Following an early-season shoulder injury, he made his AFL debut for the Suns against Fremantle in round 12 of the 2025 AFL season, becoming the first player of Cuban descent to compete in the AFL. He kicked a goal on debut at Carrara Stadium.

In Opening Round of the 2026 AFL season, Lombard kicked two goals from 15 disposals to earn a nomination for the 2026 AFL Rising Star award. In May, he extended his contract with the Suns, keeping him at the club until the end of 2030.

In round 20 against Carlton, Lombard was involved in a heated on-field exchange with teammate Christian Petracca during the club's ninth consecutive defeat; broadcast cameras captured Lombard mouthing an expletive-laden phrase at the veteran midfielder following a turnover in the forward line.

== Statistics ==
Updated to the end of round 22, 2026.

Legend
| G | Goals | K | Kicks | D | Disposals | T | Tackles |
| B | Behinds | H | Handballs | M | Marks |

| Season | Team | No. | Games | Totals | | | | | | | Averages (per game) | | | | | | | Votes |
| Season | Team | No. | Games | G | B | K | H | D | M | T | G | B | K | H | D | M | T | Votes |
|---|---|---|---|---|---|---|---|---|---|---|---|---|---|---|---|---|---|---|
| 2025 | Gold Coast | 30 | 4 | 1 | 2 | 11 | 8 | 19 | 4 | 7 | 0.3 | 0.5 | 2.8 | 2.0 | 4.8 | 1.0 | 1.8 | 0 |
| 2026 | Gold Coast | 8 | 21 | 15 | 17 | 140 | 173 | 313 | 55 | 53 | 0.7 | 0.8 | 6.7 | 8.2 | 14.9 | 2.6 | 2.5 | 0 |
| Career | | | 25 | 16 | 19 | 151 | 181 | 332 | 59 | 60 | 0.6 | 0.8 | 6.0 | 7.2 | 13.3 | 2.4 | 2.4 | 0 |
