= Australian rules football in South East Queensland =

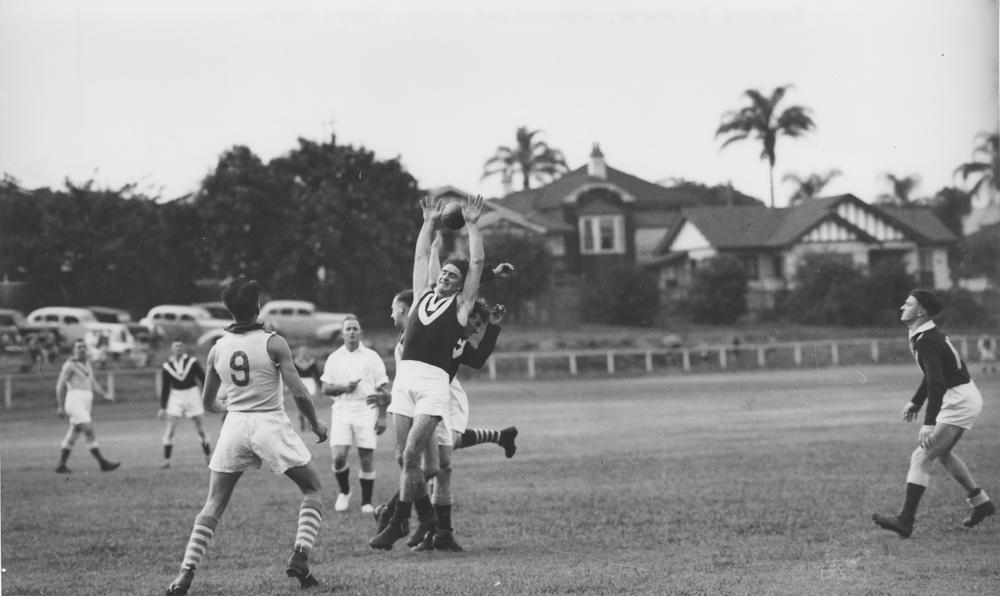
- Taringa v West, 1940
- Governing body: AFL Queensland
- First played: 1866; 160 years ago
- Clubs: 46 (divided in 5 divisions)

Club competitions
- QFA (Division 1 to 5)

Australian rules football in South East Queensland has a varied history, and many changes were made especially in the 21st century. Ruled and organised by the AFL Queensland, the region had a total of 46 teams playing in different divisions.

Occasionally inter-zone matches are held with separate South East Queensland representative sides taking part, they include the "Gold Coast Stingrays", the "Suncoast Power", the "Western Taipans", and the "Northern Raiders".
Additionally when the South East competes together they are known as the "South East Bushrangers".

== History ==
=== Early beginning ===
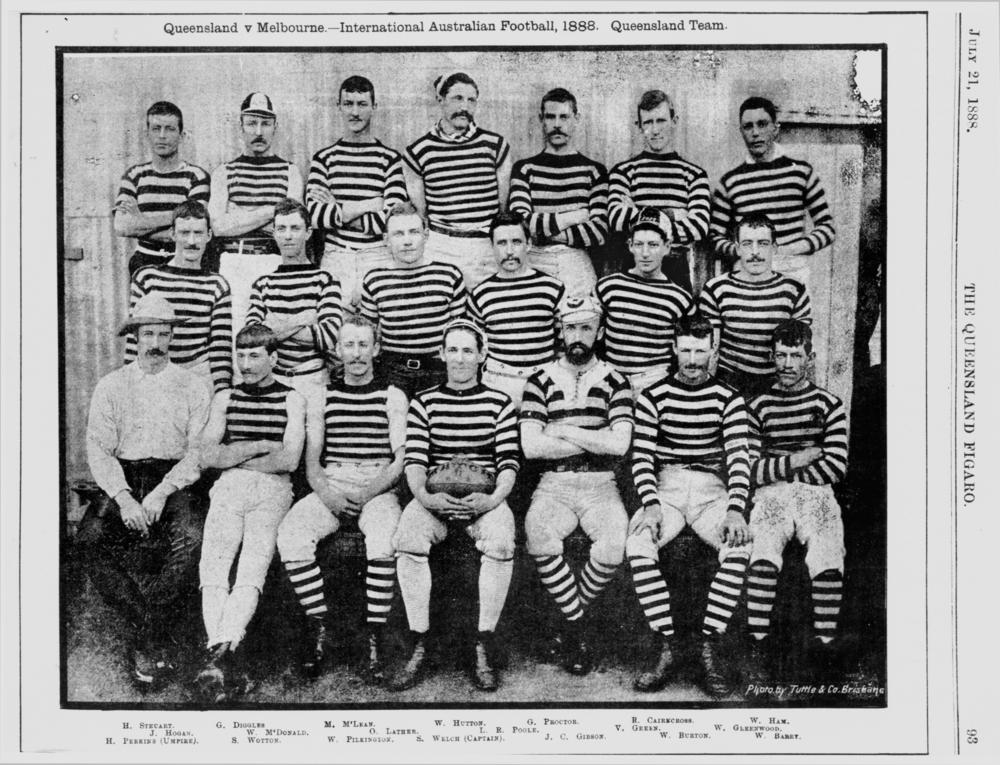
The Queensland state team who played Melbourne in 1888

The earliest known record of Australian rules football commencing in Queensland was in May 1866, when the Brisbane Football Club was formed, with the aim of keeping cricketers fit in the winter months. The club played its first match on Saturday 9 June 1866 at Queen's Park (now part of the Brisbane City Botanic Gardens). By 1870 four more clubs had been created: Volunteer Artillery, Brisbane Grammar School, Civil Service and Ipswich, all adopting Victorian Rules over rugby football.

The original Brisbane Football Club disbanded in the late 1880s and has no direct relationship to the modern Brisbane Bears or Lions clubs.

The first schoolboys match was between Brisbane Grammar played matches against Ipswich Grammar in 1870 – the outcome was a draw. Early games in Queensland were exceptionally long – one match between IGS and Brisbane Grammar in 1876 commenced at 10.30 a.m. and ended at 2.30 p.m., at which time IGS had scored 6 goals to Brisbane Grammar's nil.

During this era, no local governing body for the game was established. All rules and decisions about the rules and competitions were still made from Melbourne and was known in Queensland as "Victorian Rules".

However Victorian rules was growing rapidly and was the most popular football code in Queensland by 1880. Queensland sent delegates to the Intercolonial Football Conference in 1883.

By the early 1880s, there may have been as many as 300 players in the Brisbane and Ipswich region, as contemporaneous newspaper records show that there were at least six active clubs (Brisbane, Excelsiors, Grammars, Wallaroos, Rovers and Athenians (Ipswich)), each of which had at least two teams ('senior' and 'junior' 20s). Matches were played at the Albert Ground, Kedron Park, Grammar School and Ipswich, with occasional matches at Queen's Park.

In 1887, one of the most significant events in the history of the code occurred at this time. Independent Schools headmasters voted by 1 vote to adopt rugby football. The decision was influenced by the recent creation of a Queensland-based governing body to govern rugby, and the majority of councillors objected on the basis that the reference of "Victorian" in the name of the sport did not represent the interests of Queenslanders. This dealt a significant blow to the sport and advantage to rugby union.

Despite the advances made by Queensland football, it was clear that Victoria was progressing faster than any other state. On 21 June 1890, South Melbourne Football Club toured, playing against Queensland on Albion Park. The result of the match was a complete 6-17 to 1-0 humiliation (behinds were recorded in the scores at the time but did not actually count until 1897). The humiliation was obviously felt by the players as when Queensland defeated a New South Wales Rugby Union team shortly afterwards many of the former rugby players receded from the Australian football ranks and formed clubs of their own. Over the next few years, rugby union's popularity in South East Queensland would swamp Victorian Rules.

=== Modern era ===
In 1969, the "South Queensland Australian Football Association" (SQAFA) was established with the purpose of developing players for the Queensland Australian Football League (QAFL). Most of the players were amateurs. In 1992, the league changed its name to the "Brisbane Australian Football League" (BAFL) and included clubs from the Sunshine Coast.

Another name change in 2000 brought about AFL South Queensland. In 2006, AFL South Queensland was taken under the umbrella of AFL Queensland and rebranded as the Queensland State Association. In 2012, it was renamed South East Queensland AFL. Finally in 2014 the local level was divided into two leagues, the Queensland Football Association (QFA) and the Queensland Amateur Football Association (QAFA). Again in 2017 the name will change again to the Queensland Football Association, now covering five divisions and the re-introduction of two regional based leagues (AFL Northern Rivers & AFL Sunshine Coast / Wide Bay).

== Former AFL South Queensland Divisions ==
Notable former Queensland Football Association regional Divisions

=== 2003 Bundaberg-Wide Bay Hinterland Division ===
All four AFL Bundaberg-Wide Bay Clubs from 2002, Hervey Bay Bombers, Across the Waves Bundaberg Eagles, Brothers Bulldogs and Maryborough Bears were joined by teams further south, Gympie Cats, Pomona Demons, Glasshouse and Bribie Island to play one season against each other before reverting to their various regional leagues in 2004 once again.

Finals summary:

- Elimination Final - Maryborough 13.8-86 defeated Glasshouse 10.7-67
- Qualifying Final - Across the Waves 13.12-90 defeated Bribie Island 11.11-77
- First Semi Final - Maryborough 15.14-104 defeated Bribie Island 12.6-78
- Second Semi Final - Hervey Bay 18.15-123 defeated Across the Waves 9.7-61
- Preliminary Final - Across the Waves 14.15-99 defeated Maryborough 4.10-34
- GRAND FINAL - Hervey Bay 8.8-56 defeated Across the Waves 6.17-53

== See also ==
- Australian rules football in Queensland
- AFL Queensland
