= 2009 Gold Coast Football Club season =

Gold Coast
2009 season
- Coach: Guy McKenna
- Captain: Marc Lock
- Home ground: Carrara Stadium
- Best and fairest: Marc Lock

The 2009 Gold Coast Football Club season was the club's inaugural season. It competed in the 2009 TAC Cup season beginning on 4 April 2009, just five days after the club was granted a provisional licence to enter the Australian Football League (AFL) in 2011.

Gold Coast did not yet have a nickname, and it was not until July 2010 that the club would be known as the "Suns".

== Background ==
Gold Coast Football Club Ltd was registered with the Australian Securities and Investments Commission on 24 December 2007 by the Australian Football League. On 12 March 2008, the AFL received unanimous support from the existing 16 clubs for two expansion teams to enter the league.

Collingwood assistant coach Guy McKenna was officially announced as GC17's inaugural head coach in August 2008. On 5 September, the bid team announced the club would be known as the Gold Coast Football Club and would wear red, gold and blue.

In October 2008, the GCFC bid team presented their submission to the AFL commission which included 42,000 committed supporters and the required 111 business partners. The AFL Commission revealed in November that the newly formed team would compete in the TAC Cup in 2009 and the Victorian Football League (VFL) in 2010, but had not yet been granted an AFL licence.

On 31 March 2009, AFL Chief Executive Andrew Demetriou announced that the Gold Coast bid team had been granted a provisional licence to enter the AFL in 2011. By this time, Gold Coast had already played two official practice matches.

== Season summary ==
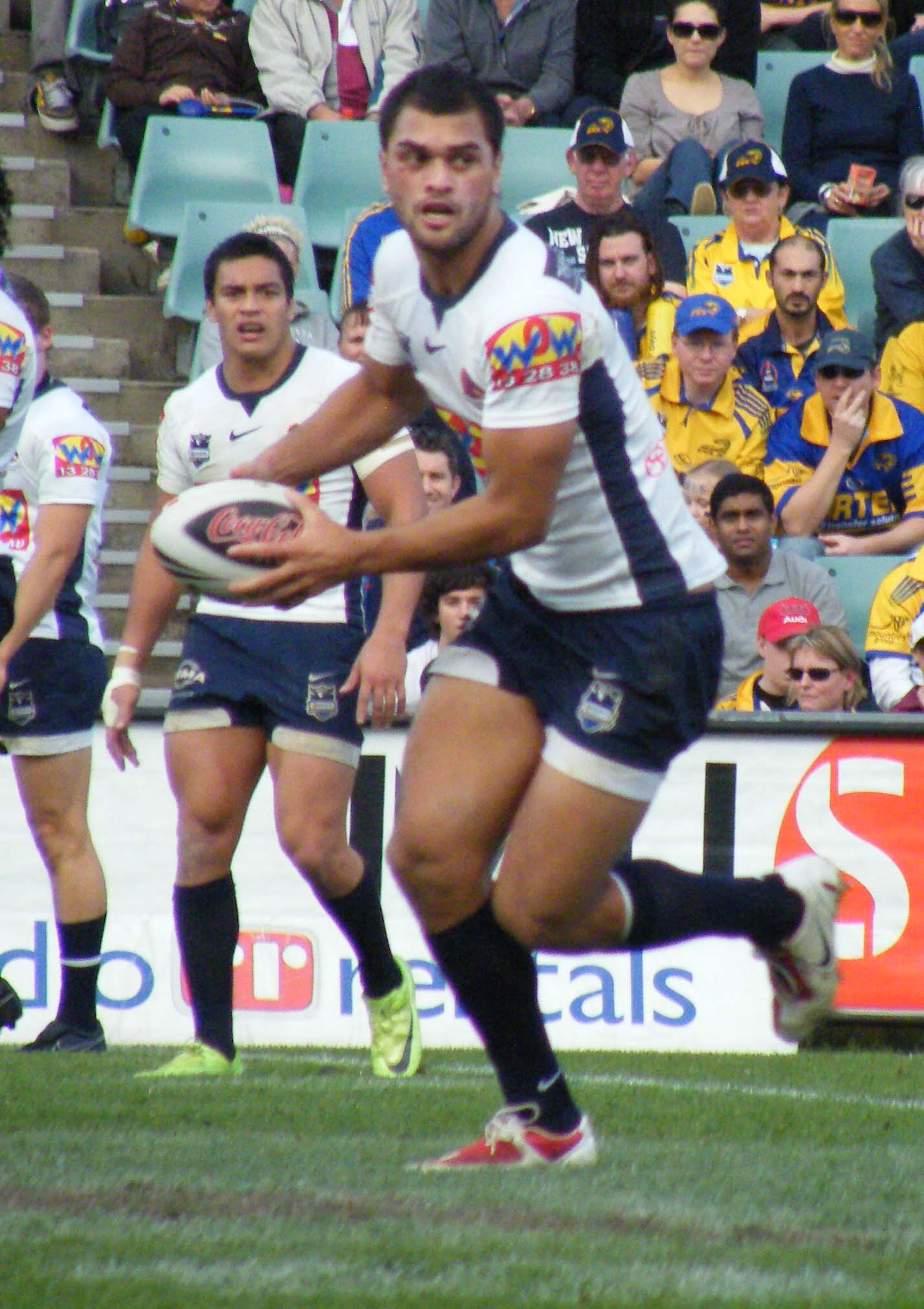
Brisbane Broncos fullback Karmichael Hunt signed with Gold Coast on 29 July 2009

Gold Coast scheduled a practice match against the reigning QAFL premiers Southport Sharks in the buildup to their first game in the TAC Cup. The Gold Coast would go down to the Sharks 6.3 (39) to 3.5 (23) at Carrara Stadium. Marc Lock was named as the first captain of the club just days before their first round clash with the Eastern Ranges in the TAC Cup. The club lost their first round clash with the Rangers by 38 points at Carrara Stadium.

The following week, the Gold Coast recorded their first ever victory during a 134-point annihilation of the Western Jets. The team went on to record 10 wins in their following 15 matches. The results would see the Gold Coast finish fifth on the ladder and earn them a spot in the finals. A top of the table clash in the last round saw Gold Coast miss a crucial double chance for the finals with a loss to the Geelong Falcons. Gold Coast would come out victorious in their elimination final against the Northern Knights, but their dream season came to an end the following week in a semi-final loss to the Geelong Falcons.

During the season, on 29 July, Gold Coast announced the signing of professional rugby league footballer Karmichael Hunt. The three-year contract would begin in May 2010 when Hunt completed his prior commitments to play Rugby Union in France. The local media was quick to label the signing a publicity stunt with most media outlets tipping Hunt to return to the NRL before his contract expired. Hunt completed his last game for the Broncos in a preliminary final loss to the Melbourne Storm at Etihad Stadium. "It's a bit of a sad moment for me but I will still be playing football in the future, it will just be a different code." Hunt said after the game. He then traveled to France to play Rugby Union for Biarritz Olympique in the Top 14 competition.

== Results ==
Rd	Home team	Score		Away team	Score	Ground	Date
1	Gold Coast	9.10 (64)	def by	Eastern Ranges	16.6 (102)	Carrara Stadium	Saturday, 4 April
2	Western Jets	5.5 (35)	def by	Gold Coast	26.13 (169)	Burbank Oval	Sunday, 12 April
3	Bye
4	Tassie Mariners	4.5 (29)	drew with	Gold Coast	3.11 (29)	MCG	Sunday, 26 April
5	Calder Cannons	18.11 (119)	def	Gold Coast	15.13 (103)	ABD Group Stadium	Sunday, 3 May
6	Gold Coast	12.7 (79)	def	Gippsland Power	12.5 (77)	Carrara Stadium	Saturday, 9 May
7	Gold Coast	9.11 (65)	def	Dandenong Stingrays	8.12 (60)	Carrara Stadium	Saturday, 16 May
8	Gold Coast	10.9 (69)	def by	NSW/ACT Rams	14.10 (94)	Carrara Stadium	Saturday, 23 May
9	Gold Coast	7.13 (55)	def	Oakleigh Chargers	7.10 (52)	Carrara Stadium	Saturday, 30 May
10	Gold Coast	10.17 (77)	def	North Ballarat Rebels	11.4 (70)	Carrara Stadium	Saturday, 13 June
11	Tassie Mariners	16.14 (110)	def	Gold Coast	7.6 (48)	Aurora Stadium	Saturday, 20 June
12	Bye
13	Gold Coast	5.8 (38)	def by	Murray Bushrangers	14.9 (93)	Carrara Stadium	Saturday, 4 July
14	Gold Coast	13.16 (94)	def	Northern Knights	10.6 (66)	Carrara Stadium	Saturday, 11 July
15	Gold Coast	13.16 (94)	def	Western Jets	10.6 (66)	Carrara Stadium	Saturday, 18 July
16	North Ballarat Rebels	8.14 (62)	def	Gold Coast	7.6 (48)	Northern Oval	Saturday, 26 July
17	Gold Coast	15.16 (106)	def	Sandringham Dragons	8.2 (50)	Carrara Stadium	Sunday, 2 August
18	Gold Coast	12.14 (86)	def	Bendigo Pioneers	6.11 (47)	Carrara Stadium	Saturday, 15 August
19	Gippsland Power	10.9 (69)	def by	Gold Coast	12.14 (86)	Visy Park	Sunday, 23 August
20	Gold Coast	6.14 (50)	def by	Geelong Falcons	14.7 (91)	Carrara Stadium	Saturday, 29 August
Elim Final	Gold Coast	10.17 (77)	def	Northern Knights	9.9 (63)	Visy Park	Saturday, 5 September
Semi Final	Gold Coast	5.9 (39)	def by	Geelong Falcons	11.14 (80)	Visy Park	Sunday, 13 September

== 2009 playing squad ==
33 players were named on the Gold Coast list in 2009, with Marc Lock as the inaugural captain.

=== Inaugural team (Round 1, 2009) ===
B:	Hamish Watts	James Nelis	Daniel Ramage
HB:	Jake Crawford	Matt Storey	Jesse Haberfield
C:	Joseph Daye	Josh Thomas	Todd Grayson
HF:	Taylor Rolfe	Matt Fowler	Luke Shreeve
F:	Rory Thompson	Liam Rutledge	Alik Magin
Foll:	Zac Smith	Marc Lock (c)	Mitch Harley
Int:	Declan Bevan	Brad Rees	Jack Stanlake
Int:	Nick Price	Tyler Green	
Coach:	Guy McKenna		
