= Rory Thompson =

Australian rules footballer (born 1991)

Personal information
- Full name: Rory Thompson
- Born: 12 March 1991 (age 35); Gold Coast, Queensland, Australia
- Original team: Southport (QAFL)
- Draft: Zone Selection, 2009, Gold Coast
- Height: 200 cm (6 ft 7 in)
- Weight: 91 kg (201 lb)
- Position: Defender

Playing career
| Years | Club | Games (Goals) |
| 2011–2022 | Gold Coast | 106 (7) |

Career highlights
- 22under22 team: 2013

Rory Thompson (born 12 March 1991) is a former Australian rules footballer who played for the Gold Coast Football Club in the Australian Football League (AFL). He was one of the club's Zone Selections, and played in the Gold Coast's first season, in 2011.

== Junior football ==
Thompson is the son of Southport Sharks hall-of-famer and dual premiership player Brett Thompson. He originally played rugby league for the Parkwood Sharks before switching to his father's old club to begin junior football. Thompson attended Helensvale State High School during his junior football and upon graduation was signed by the Gold Coast Football Club to compete in the TAC Cup in 2009. Following Thompson's announcement of signing with the Gold Coast, it was revealed the Brisbane Lions had a strong interest in the local junior and intended to draft him at the 2008 AFL draft had he elected.

== AFL career ==
Thompson was one of only four players from the Gold Coast region drafted into the inaugural Gold Coast Suns squad, the others being Marc Lock, Jack Stanlake and Joel Wilkinson.

Thompson made his AFL debut in Round 16 of the 2011 AFL season in a 70-point loss to the Sydney Swans at home.

After a breakout 2013 season, Thompson was selected at full-back in the AFL Players' inaugural 22under22 team.

In 2014, Thompson kept Sydney Swans full-forward Kurt Tippett goal-less in the Suns' 35-point loss in their round 12 match.

In November 2022, Thompson retired as the longest-serving player of the Gold Coast Suns, due to knee injuries.

== Statistics ==
Statistics are correct to the end of round 3, 2022

Legend
| G | Goals | K | Kicks | D | Disposals | T | Tackles |
| B | Behinds | H | Handballs | M | Marks |

| Season | Team | No. | Games | Totals | | | | | | | Averages (per game) | | | | | | | Votes |
| Season | Team | No. | Games | G | B | K | H | D | M | T | G | B | K | H | D | M | T | Votes |
|---|---|---|---|---|---|---|---|---|---|---|---|---|---|---|---|---|---|---|
| 2011 | Gold Coast | 16 | 8 | 2 | 2 | 48 | 40 | 88 | 39 | 22 | 0.3 | 0.3 | 6.0 | 5.0 | 11.0 | 4.9 | 2.8 | 0 |
| 2012 | Gold Coast | 16 | 5 | 0 | 0 | 32 | 14 | 46 | 18 | 12 | 0.0 | 0.0 | 6.4 | 2.8 | 9.2 | 3.6 | 2.4 | 0 |
| 2013 | Gold Coast | 16 | 21 | 5 | 3 | 157 | 89 | 246 | 105 | 39 | 0.2 | 0.1 | 7.5 | 4.2 | 11.7 | 5.0 | 1.9 | 2 |
| 2014 | Gold Coast | 16 | 19 | 0 | 0 | 91 | 73 | 164 | 58 | 49 | 0.0 | 0.0 | 4.8 | 3.8 | 8.6 | 3.1 | 2.6 | 0 |
| 2015 | Gold Coast | 16 | 12 | 0 | 0 | 54 | 37 | 91 | 38 | 15 | 0.0 | 0.0 | 4.5 | 3.1 | 7.6 | 3.2 | 1.3 | 0 |
| 2016 | Gold Coast | 16 | 14 | 0 | 2 | 75 | 65 | 140 | 68 | 27 | 0.0 | 0.1 | 5.4 | 4.6 | 10.0 | 4.9 | 1.9 | 0 |
| 2017 | Gold Coast | 16 | 7 | 0 | 0 | 41 | 31 | 72 | 29 | 20 | 0.0 | 0.0 | 5.9 | 4.4 | 10.3 | 4.1 | 2.9 | 0 |
| 2018 | Gold Coast | 16 | 17 | 0 | 1 | 84 | 55 | 139 | 42 | 26 | 0.0 | 0.1 | 4.9 | 3.2 | 8.2 | 2.5 | 1.5 | 0 |
| 2019 | Gold Coast | 16 | 0 | – | – | – | – | – | – | – | – | – | – | – | – | – | – | – |
| 2020 (Note: The 2020 season was played with 17 home-and-away matches per team (down from 22) and 16-minute quarters with time on (down from 20-minute quarters with time on) due to the impact of the COVID-19 pandemic.) | Gold Coast | 16 | 0 | – | – | – | – | – | – | – | – | – | – | – | – | – | – | – |
| 2021 | Gold Coast | 16 | 0 | – | – | – | – | – | – | – | – | – | – | – | – | – | – | – |
| 2022 | Gold Coast | 16 | 0 | – | – | – | – | – | – | – | – | – | – | – | – | – | – | – |
| Career | | | 103 | 7 | 8 | 582 | 404 | 986 | 397 | 210 | 0.1 | 0.1 | 5.7 | 3.9 | 9.6 | 3.9 | 2.0 | 2 |
