= Jack Hutchins =

Jack Hutchins may refer to:

- Jack Hutchins (runner) (1926–2008), Canadian middle-distance runner
- Jack Hutchins (footballer) (born 1992), Australian rules football player
