= Josh Toy =

Australian rules footballer

Personal information
- Full name: Joshua Toy
- Born: 18 April 1992 (age 34)
- Original team: Calder Cannons (TAC Cup)
- Draft: Underage recruit, Gold Coast
- Height: 184 cm (6 ft 0 in)
- Weight: 83 kg (183 lb)
- Position: Midfielder

Playing career^{1}
Years	Club	Games (Goals)
2011–2012	Gold Coast	13 (1)
- ^{1} Playing statistics correct to the end of 2011.

Career highlights
- Inaugural Gold Coast AFL team

Josh Toy (born 18 April 1992) is a former professional Australian rules footballer who played for the Gold Coast Football Club in the Australian Football League (AFL). He was one of Gold Coast's underage recruits, and played in their first season. Toy was a part of Gold Coast's inaugural team in round 2, against Carlton, where he was utilized as a substitute player. During his time with the Suns, Toy was diagnosed with a heart condition (congenital heart block) which affected his endurance and aerobic capacity, without being a threat to his overall health.

During the 2012 Trade Period, Toy requested for a trade back to his home state of Victoria. After failing to arrange a trade deal, Toy was delisted by the Suns late in October 2012. Despite training with Richmond and being interviewed by several other Victorian clubs, Toy was not drafted in either the pre-season or rookie drafts.
