= Gold Coast Suns =

Australian rules football club

Names
- Full name: GCFC Limited, trading as Gold Coast Suns
- Nickname(s): Suns, Sunnies, Coasters
- Former nickname: The Coast (2009–2010)

2025 season
- After finals: AFL: 6th
- Home-and-away season: AFL: 7th
- Leading goalkicker: AFL: Ben King (55 goals)
- Gold Coast Suns Club Champion: AFL: Matt Rowell

Club details
- Founded: 31 March 2009; 17 years ago
- Colours: Official colours: Deep Red; Sunburnt Gold; Oceanic Blue Alternative colours: Pink; Charcoal
- Competition: AFL: Senior men AFLW: Senior women VFL: Reserves men Talent League: Academy Boys; Talent League Girls: Academy Girls
- Chairperson: Bob East
- CEO: Mark Evans
- Coach: AFL: Damien Hardwick; AFLW: Rhyce Shaw; VFL: Tate Kaesler
- Captain(s): AFL: Noah Anderson; AFLW: Niamh McLaughlin & Lucy Single; VFL: Alex Sexton
- Membership (2025): ▲30,107
- Premierships: AFL (0); AFLW (0); VFL (1); 2023
- Ground: AFL; People First Stadium (25,000); TIO Stadium (12,500); AFLW; People First Stadium (25,000); Great Barrier Reef Arena (10,000); VFL; People First Stadium (25,000); Talent League; People First Stadium (25,000); Talent League Girls; People First Stadium (25,000)
- Training ground: People First Stadium & Austworld Centre Oval

Uniforms
Home	Away	Gather Round

Other information
- Official website: goldcoastfc.com.au

The Gold Coast Suns, officially the Gold Coast Football Club, are a professional Australian rules football club that competes in the Australian Football League (AFL). The club is based on the Gold Coast in Queensland.

Founded in 2009, the club has been playing in the AFL since the 2011 season. It plays home matches at Carrara Stadium (known for commercial purposes as People First Stadium) and has its training and administrative facilities located at the adjacent Gold Coast Sports and Leisure Centre. The club is one of two AFL clubs based in Queensland, the other being its main rival, the Brisbane Lions, which it competes against in the QClash.

In addition to the men's team, the Suns field other teams, including an AFL Women's side, a reserves side in the Victorian Football League, and a Gold Coast Suns Academy side consisting of the club's best junior development signings. It also competes in Division 2 of the men's, women's underage championships, and the Talent League.

== History ==
Chart of yearly ladder positions for Gold Coast in AFL

=== Foundation ===
The first application for a licence by a Gold Coast team to enter the AFL was made in 1996 by the wealthy and popular Gold Coast-based Southport Sharks (formed 1961); with an excess of 20,000 members, the on-field QAFL powerhouse made a formal bid to the AFL. However, the AFL declined the licence in favour of admitting the Port Adelaide Football Club. There was strong opposition from the majority of the QAFL clubs and supporters, and the AFL felt that the popular Sharks brand, and its reliance on gaming and hospitality revenue, could divide rather than unite the Gold Coast community. In 2006, the AFL attempted to negotiate a merger between the Sharks and a Melbourne-based club. The AFL made the Gold Coast a primary target for a proposed relocation of the North Melbourne Football Club which had sold some of its home games there. The league pushed for a merger with the Sharks offering significant financial incentives, however North Melbourne blocked the move and the AFL decided that a new licence would be the best avenue for moving forward. On 24 December 2007, the AFL obtained Australian Securities and Investments Commission (ASIC) registration for the name "Gold Coast Football Club Ltd". In March 2008 the AFL won the support of the league's 16 club presidents to establish sides on the Gold Coast and in Western Sydney. Shortly thereafter the AFL invited the Sharks to become part of a consortium, and the club made a $150,000 donation and sought to meet the strict criteria set down for inclusion by the AFL. As part of the winning bid, the Sharks contributed $10 million in corporate sponsorship. However the AFL officially ruled out use of the Sharks nickname (along with other nominations including the Dolphins and Pirates) for the new club, despite them being the highest polling choices of AFL supporters. The club's identity was put to a public nomination and voting process with the Marlins and Stingrays being the most popular of the available options among community stakeholders. In response to the poll, however the AFL announced that it would not adopt any of the community suggested names and the team would initially remain unnamed and that the nickname would evolve. However it was later leaked that the AFL's marketing department had already chosen the Suns brand independent of the community consultation.

The new club was formally granted the licence to compete in the AFL on 31 March 2009.

AFL CEO Andrew Demetriou announced the club could debut in the Queensland State League in 2009 as it recruited players and prepared for its debut season in the AFL, which the league scheduled for 2011. Marquee AFL players such as Nick Riewoldt, Lance Franklin, Nic Naitanui and Kurt Tippett were speculated as potential signings for Gold Coast, though all four men ended up re-signing with their existing clubs. In June 2008 it was announced that the new team would play in the TAC Cup in 2009 and the Victorian Football League in 2010 ahead of its entry into the AFL in 2011. Later that year the board of business-people who had been appointed to set up the club, and were known as the GC17 bid, appointed WAFL coach and former West Coast player Guy McKenna as senior coach. Essendon administrator Travis Auld was selected as head of the GC17 board, and would go on to lead the club in an off-field capacity for several years.

The AFL were able to successfully negotiate with the Queensland Government to redevelop Carrara Stadium as the club's new home ground. The announcement of the redevelopment, of which a small portion was funded by the AFL, was made in May 2009. On 22 July 2010 club administrators announced that the club would be known as the Gold Coast Suns, and adopt the colours red, gold and blue.

=== 2009: TAC Cup ===
The club's newly assembled junior squad competed in the 2009 TAC Cup under 18 competition and won most of their games, eventually finishing in 5th place. They defeated the Northern Knights in the elimination final but then lost their semi final to the Geelong Falcons.

=== 2010: VFL ===
In November 2009 the team signed twelve 17-year-olds around the country to compete in the Victorian Football League (VFL) year through the under age access rules. These players included Luke Russell (Burnie), Maverick Weller (Burnie), Taylor Hine (Calder), Josh Toy (Calder), Matt Shaw (Dandenong), Piers Flanagan (Geelong), Hayden Jolly (Glenelg), Alex Keath (Murray), Jack Hutchins (Sandringham), Tom Nicholls (Sandringham), Brandon Matera (South Fremantle), Trent McKenzie (Western Jets).

The Gold Coast was also given permission (by the AFL) to play David Swallow in 2010, despite not being the correct age. The deal that was struck with the AFL stated that Swallow would still need to go through the 2010 AFL draft to officially join the team, while the other under age recruits contracts would run through 2011.

Inaugural VFL team

Inaugural GCFC team (round 1, 2010 season)
B:	Matt Shaw	Jack Hutchins	Michael Gugliotta
HB:	Taylor Hine	Michael Coad	Maverick Weller
C:	Trent McKenzie	Marc Lock (c)	Luke Russell
HF:	Alik Magin	Charlie Dixon	Brandon Matera
F:	Liam Patrick	Nathan Ablett	Rex Liddy
Foll:	Zac Smith	Daniel Harris	Sam Iles
Int:	Danny Stanley	Rory Thompson	Hayden Jolly
Int:	David Swallow	Luke Shreeve	Joseph Daye
Coach:	Guy McKenna		

=== 2011: AFL debut ===
Concessions on entry into the AFL

Year	Draft picks	Senior list size	Salary cap allowance	Zone access	Notes
2009	-	-	-	20 QLD	The club was granted access to twenty 17-year-old Queensland players who were eligible for the 2009 AFL draft. The team competed in the under 18 TAC Cup competition in 2009.
2010	-	-	-	5 QLD; 2 NT	The club was allowed to sign up to twelve 17-year-olds born between 1 January and 30 April 1992. The club also received the first 5 picks in the rookie draft. The team competed in the Victorian Football League competition in 2010.
2011	1, 2, 3, 5, 7, 9, 11, 13, 15, 26, 43	48	$1,000,000 extra	5 QLD	At the conclusion of the 2010 season the club was able to sign up to 16 current AFL players who were uncontracted for the 2011 season. The club was also allowed to sign up to 10 players who had previously elected for the national draft and weren't selected.
2012	AFL standard	46	$800,000 extra	5 QLD	-
2013	AFL standard	42	$600,000 extra	AFL standard	-
2014	AFL standard	40	$400,000 extra	AFL standard	-
2015	AFL standard	AFL standard	AFL standard	AFL standard	All concessions removed and the club operates like every other team in the AFL.

Players acquired through concessions

Concession	Players acquired
QLD zone access	Joseph Daye (2009), Charlie Dixon (2009), Jesse Haberfield (2009), Tom Hickey (2010), Rex Liddy (2010), Marc Lock (2009), Lewis Moss (2010), Zac Smith (2009), Jack Stanlake (2009), Jack Stanley (2009), Rory Thompson (2009), Joel Wilkinson (2010).
NT zone access	Steven May (2010), Liam Patrick (2009).
2009 rookie selections	Daniel Harris (1), Michael Coad (2), Sam Iles (3), Roland Ah Chee (4), Danny Stanley (5).
2009 underage selections	Piers Flanagan, Taylor Hine, Jack Hutchins, Hayden Jolly, Brandon Matera, Trent McKenzie, Tom Nicholls, Luke Russell, Matt Shaw, Josh Toy, Maverick Weller.
2010 off-contract signings	Gary Ablett Jr, Nathan Bock, Jared Brennan, Campbell Brown, Josh Fraser, Jarrod Harbrow, Nathan Krakouer, Michael Rischitelli.
2010 draft selections	David Swallow (1), Harley Bennell (2), Sam Day (3), Josh Caddy (7), Dion Prestia (9), Daniel Gorringe (10), Tom Lynch (11), Seb Tape (13).

Initial 2011 playing squad recruitment

2011 Playing Squad
Name	State	Recruited From	Selection Type
Charlie Dixon	Queensland	Redland Bombers	Zone Selection
Rex Liddy	Queensland	Kenmore Bears	Zone Selection
Lewis Moss	Queensland	Port Douglas Crocs	Zone Selection
Zac Smith	Queensland	Southport Sharks	Zone Selection
Jack Stanlake	Queensland	Southport Sharks	Zone Selection
Joel Wilkinson	Queensland	Broadbeach Cats	Zone Selection
Joseph Daye	Queensland	Southport Sharks	Zone Selection
Rory Thompson	Queensland	Southport Sharks	Zone Selection
Tom Hickey	Queensland	Morningside Panthers	Zone Selection
Marc Lock	Queensland	Labrador Tigers	Zone Selection
Steven May	Northern Territory	Melbourne Grammar School	Zone Selection
Liam Patrick	Northern Territory	Wanderers Eagles	Zone Selection
Karmichael Hunt	New Zealand	Biarritz Olympique	Rookie Promotion
Daniel Harris	Victoria	North Melbourne Kangaroos	Rookie Promotion
Michael Coad	South Australia	Sturt Double Blues	Rookie Promotion
Sam Iles	Tasmania	Box Hill Hawks	Rookie Promotion
Danny Stanley	Victoria	Collingwood Magpies	Rookie Promotion
Luke Russell	Tasmania	Burnie Dockers	Underage
Maverick Weller	Tasmania	Burnie Dockers	Underage
Matt Shaw	Victoria	Dandenong Stingrays	Underage
Trent McKenzie	Victoria	Western Jets	Underage
Josh Toy	Victoria	Calder Cannons	Underage
Hayden Jolly	South Australia	Glenelg Tigers	Underage
Brandon Matera	Western Australia	South Fremantle Bulldogs	Underage
Taylor Hine	Victoria	Calder Cannons	Underage
Piers Flanagan	Victoria	Geelong Falcons	Underage
Tom Nicholls	Victoria	Sandringham Dragons	Underage
Jack Hutchins	Australia	Sandringham Dragons	Underage
Alex Keath	Victoria	Murray Bushrangers	Underage
Nathan Bock	South Australia	Adelaide Crows	Uncontracted
Nathan Krakouer	Western Australia	Port Adelaide Power	Uncontracted
Michael Rischitelli	Victoria	Brisbane Lions	Uncontracted
Campbell Brown	Western Australia	Hawthorn Hawks	Uncontracted
Jarrod Harbrow	Queensland	Western Bulldogs	Uncontracted
Gary Ablett, Jr.	Victoria	Geelong Cats	Uncontracted
Josh Fraser	Victoria	Collingwood Magpies	Uncontracted
Jared Brennan	Northern Territory	Brisbane Lions	Uncontracted
David Swallow	Western Australia	East Fremantle Sharks	National Draft (1)
Harley Bennell	Western Australia	Peel Thunder	National Draft (2)
Sam Day	South Australia	Sturt Double Blues	National Draft (3)
Josh Caddy	Victoria	Northern Knights	National Draft (7)
Dion Prestia	Victoria	Calder Cannons	National Draft (9)
Daniel Gorringe	South Australia	Norwood Redlegs	National Draft (10)
Tom Lynch	Victoria	Dandenong Stingrays	National Draft (11)
Seb Tape	South Australia	Glenelg Tigers	National Draft (13)
Jeremy Taylor	Victoria	Geelong Falcons	National Draft (39)
Jacob Gillbee	Tasmania	Lauderdale Bombers	National Draft (49)
Nathan Ablett	Victoria	Geelong Football Club	Pre Season Draft (1)

==== Inaugural AFL team ====
Inaugural Gold Coast team (round 2, 2011 season)
B:	Seb Tape	Nathan Bock	Campbell Brown
HB:	Jarrod Harbrow	Karmichael Hunt	Nathan Krakouer
C:	Trent McKenzie	Daniel Harris	Michael Rischitelli
HF:	Danny Stanley	Charlie Dixon	Alik Magin
F:	Jared Brennan	Zac Smith	Brandon Matera
Foll:	Josh Fraser	David Swallow	Gary Ablett (c)
Int:	Marc Lock	Harley Bennell	Dion Prestia
Int:	Josh Toy		
Coach:	Guy McKenna		

=== 2011–2014: McKenna era ===
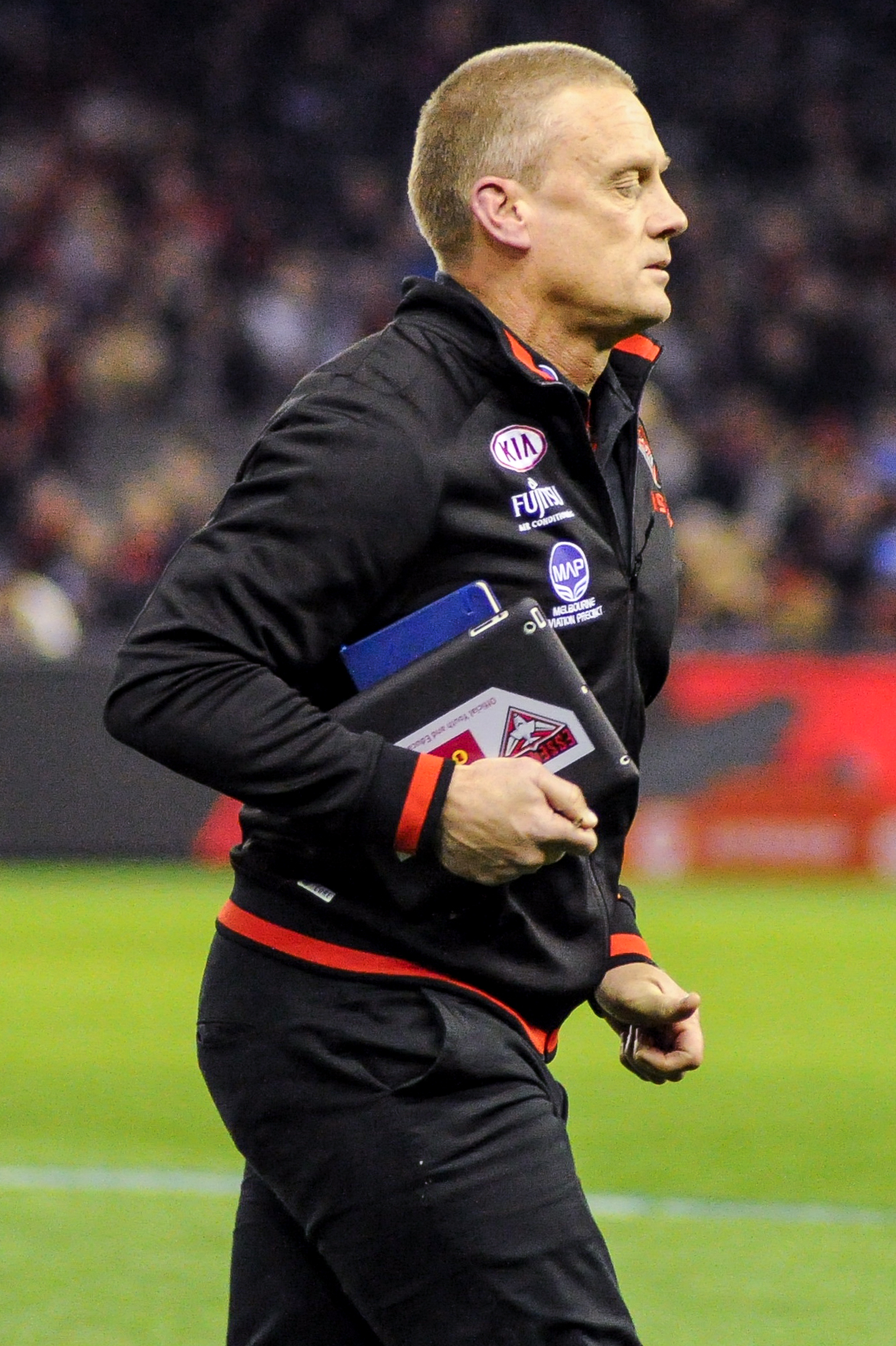
AFL Hall of Fame legend Guy McKenna, inaugural coach

Guy McKenna would continue to coach the team throughout the 2011 season and beyond, after successfully guiding the club through its journey in the TAC Cup and VFL in 2009 and 2010. The Suns would play their first four "home" games of the 2011 AFL season at the Gabba in Brisbane, while their home stadium (Metricon Stadium) underwent final redevelopment works.

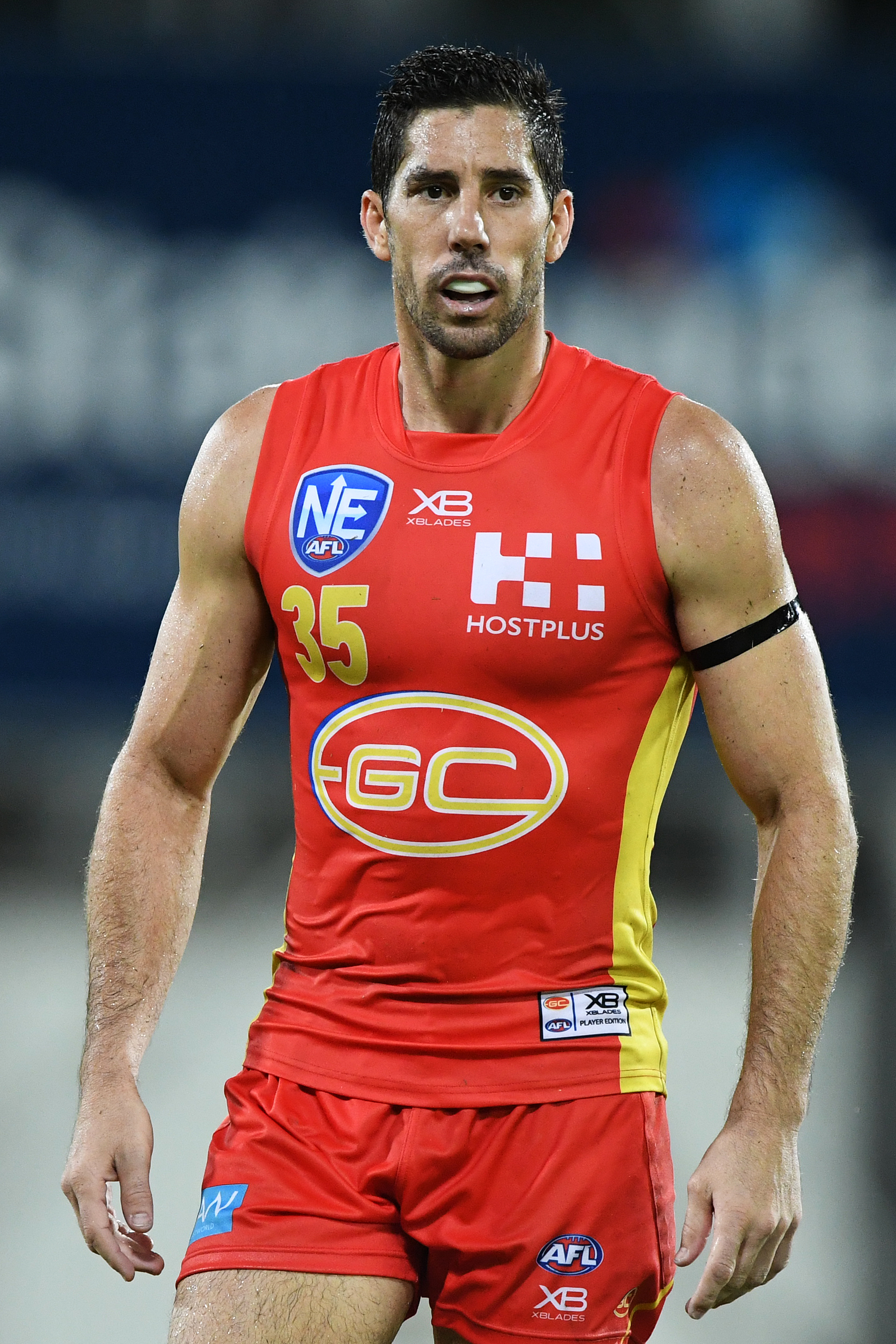
Michael Rischitelli was instrumental in the club's first winning game with 31 disposals and 2 goals against Port Adelaide at AAMI Stadium in Round 5 of the 2011 season.

Gold Coast had a bye in Round 1, and played its first AFL game debuted in Round 2 on 2 April 2011 against Carlton at the Gabba in front of a crowd of 27,914. The first five goals were scored by Carlton, before Charlie Dixon scored the first-ever goal for the Gold Coast Suns. Carlton went on to win by 119 points. Gold Coast won its first game in Round 5 on 23 April 2011, defeating Port Adelaide at AAMI Stadium. Gold Coast trailed by 40 points late in the third quarter, before coming back to win by three points, after Port Adelaide's Justin Westhoff missed a set shot after the siren. Michael Rischitelli was the best on ground. Gold Coast won two more matches for the season, winning the inaugural QClash against Brisbane Lions in Round 7 by eight points (which became the most-watched AFL match on pay television ever), and defeating Richmond by 15 points in Round 17 in the first AFL match ever played at Cazaly's Stadium in Cairns. However, the Suns also suffered several more very heavy defeats during the year, including a 139-point loss to Essendon in Round 6 – in which Essendon scored a record 15.4 (94) in the first quarter – and a 150-point loss against Geelong in Round 20. The Suns went on to win the wooden spoon.

Gold Coast endured a poor pre-season in 2012 which included a 13-point loss to fellow AFL newcomers Greater Western Sydney. Their solitary win in that time was a narrow win over Melbourne in the triangular round of the 2012 NAB Cup.

The home-and-away season did not begin well for the Suns either, losing their first fourteen matches in succession to be the only winless team after Round 15 of the 2012 AFL season. Among the losses included losses by more than ninety points to Collingwood and St Kilda (twice), seven-point losses to Fremantle and North Melbourne at home and a 27-point loss to the newest AFL franchise, Greater Western Sydney. Their fourteen losses to start the season was the worst by any team since Fremantle lost its first 17 matches of the 2001 season. Their horror start to the season ended in round 16 with a narrow 2-point win against Richmond. They had a lead of up to 36 points halfway through the second quarter, which then shrank to 24 points after 2 quick goals before half time from Richmond. Richmond then had a six to two goal quarter, snatching the lead back. The lead then went to 18 points Richmond's way before Gold Coast snatched it back to just 4. With 5 seconds left, a kick from the right forward pocket in Gold Coast's 50 was marked by Karmichael Hunt. After the siren sounded he kicked the goal to make Gold Coast 2-point winners.

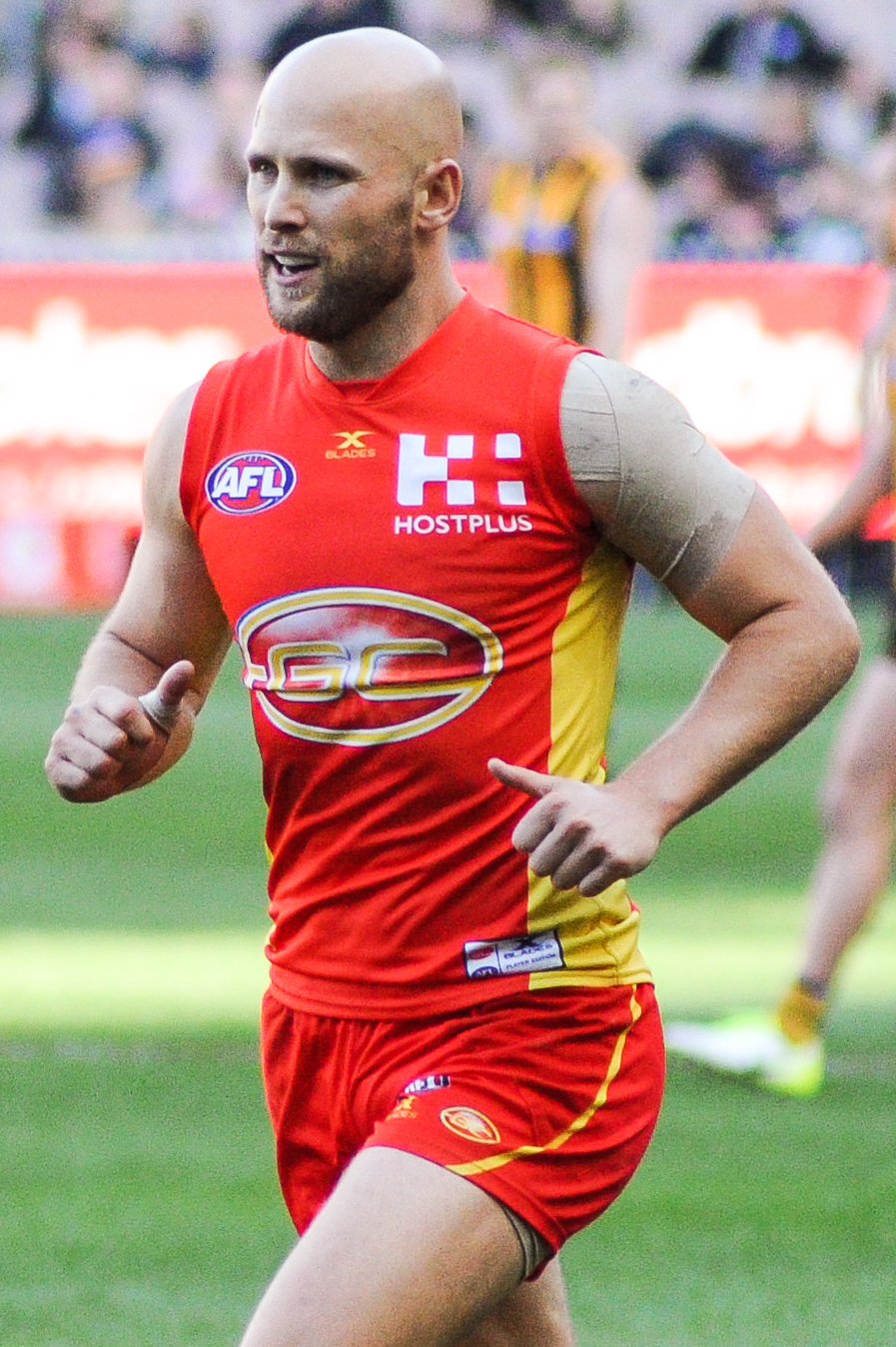
Gary Ablett Jr was Gold Coast's inaugural marquee player and captain

The Suns then won two more matches for the season, a 30-point win against Greater Western Sydney in Round 20 and a 12-point upset win over Carlton in Round 22, both at home. The team finished 17th at the end of the season, only above Greater Western Sydney on the AFL ladder. In November 2012 the club announced their "20-ONE-3" plan that targeted signing twenty thousand members and winning a premiership within three years - by the conclusion of the 2015 AFL season. The plan was criticised as being overly ambitious. By the end of the 20-ONE-3 period, the Suns had a highest membership of 13,643 (achieved in 2015) and a highest ladder position of 12 (10 wins - achieved in 2014).

In the 2013 AFL season Gold Coast improved, highlighted by a victory over eventual finalist Collingwood. Their improvement on the past two seasons was so stark that they were considered possibilities of securing an unlikely finals berth . The Suns finished with 8 wins for the season and ended the season placed 14th on the ladder. Captain Gary Ablett won his second Brownlow Medal, the first such medalist to win the award at the club.

Despite losing veterans Jared Brennan and Campbell Brown ahead of the 2014 season, some experts predicted Gold Coast to "give the top 8 (finals) a nudge", though the general consensus was that the Suns would likely finish around 13th. Though beginning the season promisingly and entering Round 11 with a 7–2 record following impressive wins on the road against Melbourne, North Melbourne (who had defeated minor premiers Sydney three weeks earlier), and St Kilda, the Suns would stumble severely through the second half of the season. After captain Gary Ablett was injured in a win over Collingwood in round 16, the club went on to lose the next two matches, including one in the QClash against Brisbane. In round 19, the club recorded its inaugural win without their captain, defeating St Kilda. The club went on to lose the remaining matches of the season, finishing in 12th. Inaugural coach Guy McKenna was sacked at season's end, leaving the club after 88 games in charge and winning just over 25% of them.

=== 2015–2017: Rodney Eade ===
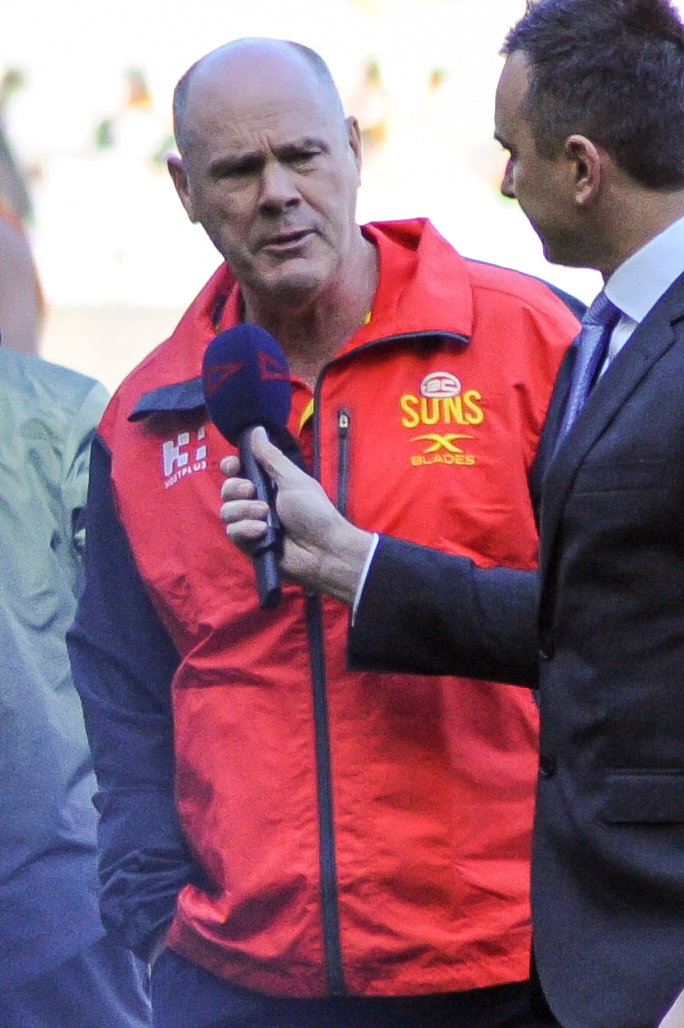
Rodney Eade as coach in his final year at the club

Following McKenna's departure, the Suns announced Rodney Eade as their new coach. Eade had coached the Sydney Swans and Western Bulldogs to multiple finals series and was regarded by some pundits as a good choice to push the Suns into a maiden finals campaign. In his first season, Eade made the decision to rush back Gary Ablett Jr into the side, which led to the on-field targeting of the star midfielder, while key position players Charlie Dixon and Harley Bennell were traded to other clubs as the Suns lost their opening four games and never recovered, finishing the 2015 season in 16th place with only four wins. The club started the 2016 season with three consecutive wins and defeated minor premiers Fremantle, giving the impression it was on the verge of achieving sustained on-field success. However it would only win a further three matches for the season and Ablett was again sidelined with a serious shoulder injury, while other players were lost to a combination of injury and suspension. The Suns hit the mid-to-late stage of the following season in reasonable form with a 6–8 win–loss record, though disastrously lost their last eight matches and finished in 15th place. Divisions between some of the players and Eade's cautious game-style emerged and by Round 19 club officials sacked Eade, citing a poor win–loss record. Eade's departure was exacerbated at the end of the season by Ablett's request to be traded back to his original club Geelong, despite having another year to serve on his contract with the club.

=== 2018–2023: Stuart Dew ===
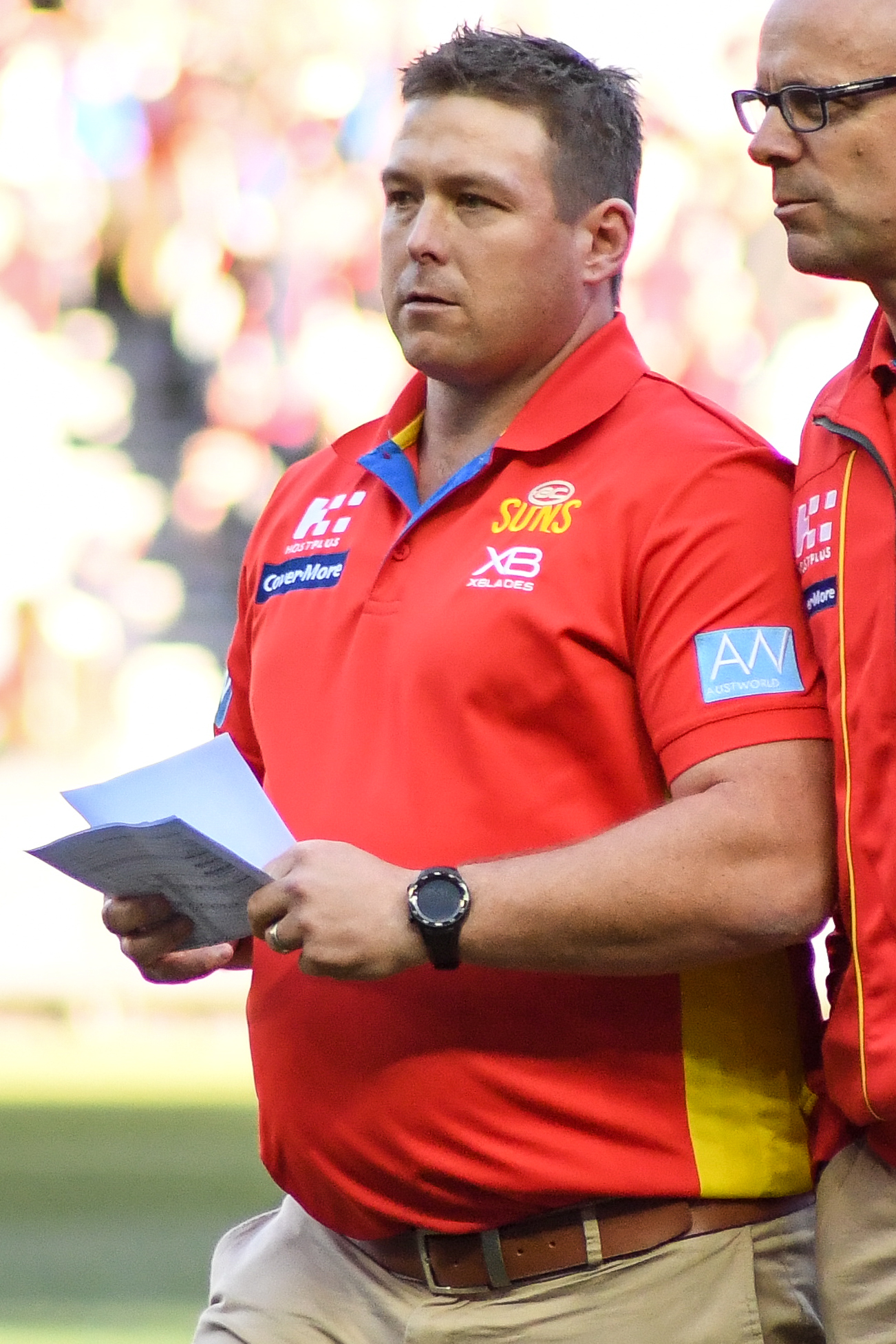
Stuart Dew coaching in 2018

The club appointed Port Adelaide and Hawthorn premiership player Stuart Dew as coach ahead of the 2018 season. Under Dew, the Suns adopted a draft strategy of recruiting young players, which in part contributed to a second-last finish in 2018 and last place finish in 2019, the latter being the club's second wooden spoon. David Swallow was appointed captain in 2019 and emerging talent such as Izak Rankine and Matt Rowell showed signs of propelling the club to better results in the future, though Rankine left the club in 2022 to play with Adelaide. Following their best win-loss record in 2022 (10 wins for a 12th-placed finish), the club stagnated on the field in 2023 and again failed to make finals. On 11 July 2023, Suns officials announced that Stuart Dew would no longer be the coach after two consecutive losses to Collingwood and Port Adelaide that eliminated them from finals contention. Dew finished with 30.17% winning record over six seasons with the club. Steven King was appointed interim coach for the remainder of the season.

=== 2024–present: Damien Hardwick ===
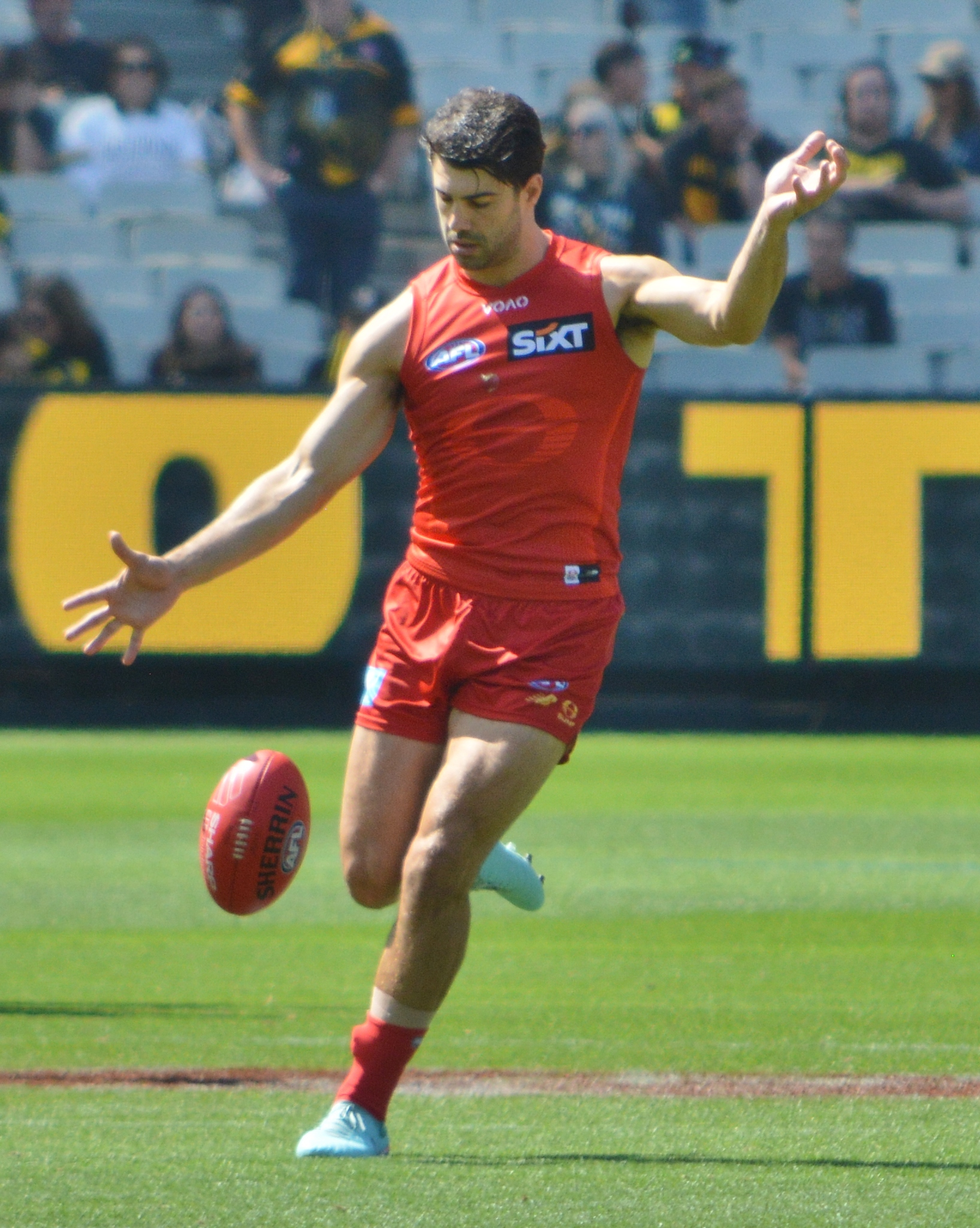
The club adopted a restyled home guernsey in 2025; midfielder Christian Petracca is seen here wearing the guernsey in a round 2, 2026 clash against Richmond.

On 21 August 2023, the club announced that three-time Richmond premiership coach Damien Hardwick had signed on as coach of the senior team for six years. In round 10 of the 2024 AFL season the Suns recorded their highest ever total to date, with 26 goals and 8 behinds, amassing a total score of 164 in a 64-point victory over Geelong.

On 15 November 2024, ahead of the 2025 season, the club unveiled a new logo and guernsey, marking the first major brand change in the clubs history. Centred around the tagline "Fearless", the updated home guernsey features the new logo in deep red on a red base, and the clash kit shows off the oceanic blue logo on a sunburnt gold base. The new branding was met with backlash from fans and critics, stating that the red on red guernsey was a strange choice, and the clash guernsey "looked awful". The logo itself features the sun rising over the ocean inside a football. The football shape is cut to represent the letters 'G', 'C' and 'S' for Gold Coast Suns. The word "SUNS" appears under the logo in a custom font. The logo can be seen in the clubs 3 colours, deep red, sunburnt gold and oceanic blue.

In that same season, Gold Coast finished seventh on the ladder and therefore qualified for the AFL finals for the first time in their history. In the elimination final, they defeated Fremantle by one point at Optus Stadium, with retiring veteran David Swallow kicking the match-winning behind in the dying stages. They then lost to the Brisbane Lions by 53 points in a historic QClash semi-final, being the first Finals QClash.

== Home ground ==
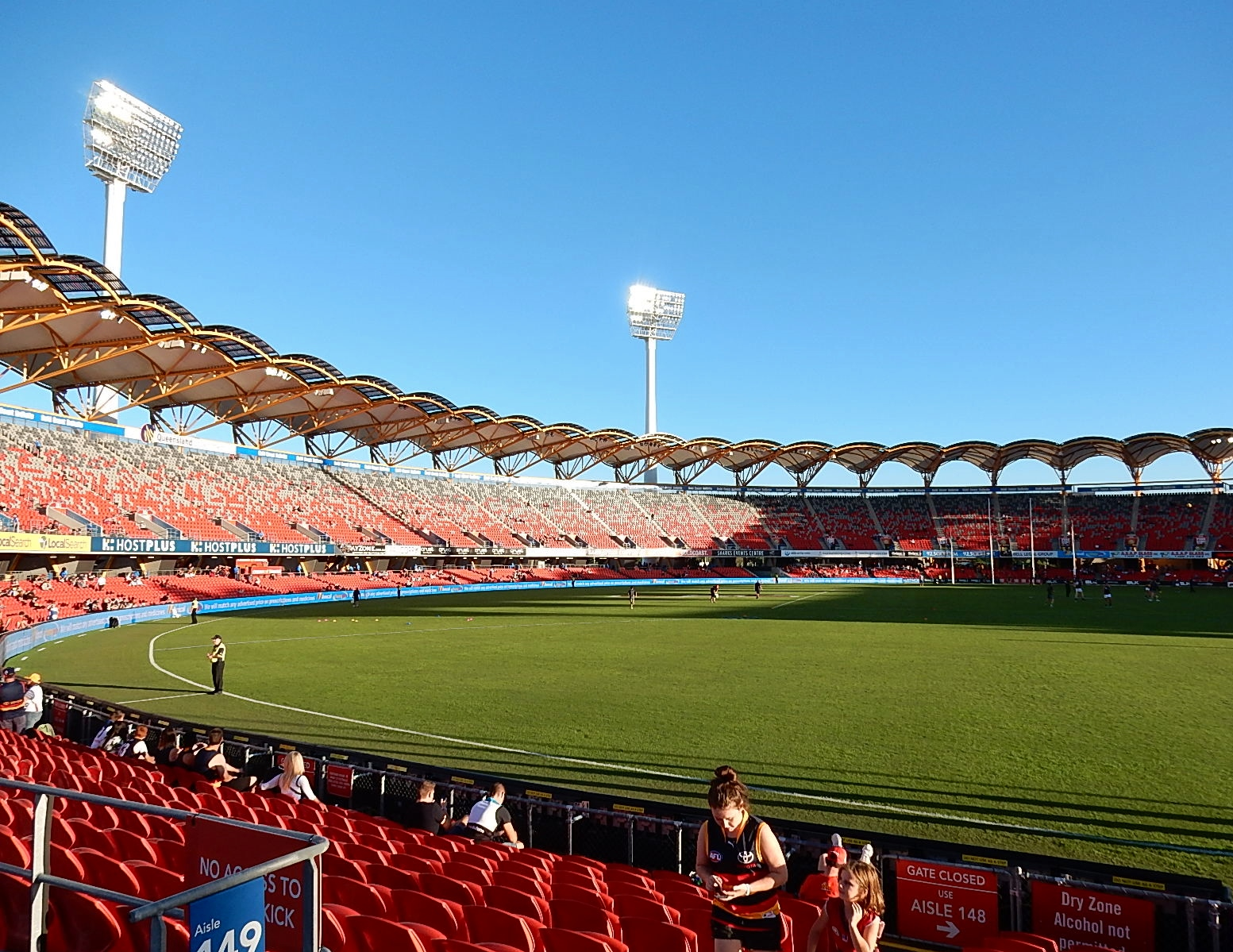
View of Carrara Stadium field and grandstand

Gold Coast began playing at Carrara Stadium in their foundation year of 2009. Although the ground had existed since 1987, the Gold Coast Football Club's establishment in late 2008 prompted the club to use the stadium as their home ground during the 2009 TAC Cup. The ground opened in 1987 and was used by the Brisbane Bears for the first six years of existence and was later used by the North Melbourne Kangaroos and several professional Rugby league teams.

The insufficient and outdated facilities at Carrara Stadium led to the Australian Football League investigating several stadium options for the Gold Coast's inaugural AFL season in 2011. A new $172 million stadium in Helensvale was a strongly considered option. The AFL eventually brokered a deal with the Gold Coast City Council and the Queensland Government to redevelop Carrara Stadium. The $144.2 million upgrade would increase the stadium capacity to 25,000.

Construction for the redevelopment of Carrara Stadium began in December 2009 and the Gold Coast was required to find a new home ground for the 2010 VFL season. The team shared their games among local grounds Fankhauser Reserve, H & A Oval and Cooke-Murphy Oval. The redevelopment ran into the 2011 AFL season and the Gold Coast were again required to find a temporary home ground. The Suns elected to use the Gabba for their first three home games of the 2011 season.

The redeveloped Carrara Stadium (commercially known as Metricon Stadium) was officially opened on 22 May 2011 by Queensland Premier Anna Bligh. Six days later, the Gold Coast Suns hosted their first home match at the redeveloped Carrara Stadium against the Geelong Cats. Two months later, the Suns attracted the largest crowd ever at the Carrara Stadium in a game against Collingwood that attracted an attendance of 23,302, a record was broken in round 16 of 2014 when 24,032 also attended against Collingwood.

The seating capacity was temporarily upgraded to 40,000 as part of the Gold Coast's successful bid to host the 2018 Commonwealth Games.

While the Suns have played most of their home games at Metricon Stadium, there have been several times when the club has played home games away from Carrara. In 2011, the club had to find a temporary home ground as the redevelopment ran into the 2011 AFL season. The Suns elected to use the Gabba for their first three home games of the 2011 season. The Gabba was again used in 2018 AFL season as Carrara was being prepared for the 2018 Commonwealth Games. In round 16 of 2014, the Stadium was sold out for the first time for a match between the suns and Collingwood. In the 2016 AFL Season, they played a home game in Cairns at Cazaly's Stadium, Perth at Optus Stadium and played the second of their home games in Shanghai at Jiangwan Stadium. This was following the club hosting the first-ever AFL game outside Australia or New Zealand in 2017 in Shanghai.

The club took a home game to their academy zone, Townsville at Riverway Stadium in 2019 before signing a deal with AFL Northern Territory to play a home game in their new academy zone Darwin at TIO Stadium from 2020 to 2024. The match scheduled for Darwin in 2021 was moved however due to COVID-19 and was played as a Suns home game at the Sydney Cricket Ground. In late June, all 18 AFL clubs relocated to Victoria due to various lockdowns due to COVID-19. This resulted in many games being relocated including a Thursday night home game from Metricon Stadium to Marvel Stadium. Brisbane Lions 'hosted' a game at Metricon Stadium against St Kilda as Greater Brisbane was still considered a red zone under Victorian COVID rules.

List of AFL Stadiums

Home games for the Gold Coast Suns
Location	Stadium	Capacity	Year	Games
Carrara	People First Stadium	25,000	2011–Present	103
Darwin	TIO Stadium	12,500	2020–Present	1
Brisbane	The Gabba	42,000	2011, 2018	4
Cairns	Cazaly's Stadium	13,500	2018	1
Shanghai	Jiangwan Stadium	11,000	2017-2018	2
Townsville	Riverway Stadium	10,000	2019	1
Perth	Optus Stadium	60,000	2018	1
Sydney	Sydney Cricket Ground	48,000	2021	1
Melbourne	Marvel Stadium	53,359	2021	1

Other home grounds used for the Suns include: AFL Pre Season: Fankhauser Reserve (2011, 2013, 2018), Riverway Stadium (2015, 2018), Merrimac Oval (2017), Great Barrier Reef Arena (2017, 2019) AFL Women's: Heritage Bank Stadium (2020–), Great Barrier Reef Arena (2020-), Bond University (2025)

== Corporate ==
=== Governance ===
The AFL Commission owns a majority stake in the club and elects seven of the nine members of its board with the two remaining being elected by the club members.

=== Membership base and sponsors ===
Members, Finishing Positions, Profits, home crowd and sponsors for the Gold Coast Suns
Year	Members	Change from previous season	Finishing position	Average home crowd	Profit (Loss)	Kit manufacturer	Major sponsor/s	Shorts sponsor	Bottom rear sponsor	Top rear sponsor
2011	14,064	N/A	17th	19,169	Undisclosed profit	Reebok	Hostplus (Home); Virgin Australia (Away)	REED	Virgin Australia (Home); Hostplus (Away)	—N/a
2012	11,204	▼2,860	17th	13,645	($1,401,168)	Reebok	Hostplus (Home); Virgin Australia (Away)	—N/a	Virgin Australia (Home); Hostplus (Away)	—N/a
2013	12,502	▲1,298	14th	13,907	$62,533	2XU	Hostplus (Home); Virgin Australia (Away)	—N/a	Virgin Australia (Home); Hostplus (Away)	—N/a
2014	13,478	▲976	12th	16,092	$1,062,082	2XU	Hostplus (Home); Fiat Automobiles (Away)	Crust Pizza	Fiat Automobiles (Home); Hostplus (Away)	—N/a
2015	13,643	▲165	16th	12,360	($330,870)	BLK	Hostplus (Home); Fiat Automobiles (Away)	Solar Australia	Fiat Automobiles (Home); Hostplus (Away)	—N/a
2016	12,854	▼789	15th	11,561	($2,941,965)	BLK	Hostplus (Home); Fiat Automobiles (Away)	Austworld	Fiat Automobiles (Home); Hostplus (Away)	—N/a
2017	11,665	▼1,189	17th	13,663	$19,219	XBlades	Hostplus	Austworld	Hostplus	—N/a
2018	12,108	▲443	17th	13,547	$1,160,912	XBlades	Hostplus (Home); Cover-More (Away)	Austworld	Cover-More (Home); Hostplus (Away)	—N/a
2019	13,649	▲1,541	18th	11,417	$248,795	XBlades	Hostplus (Home); Cover-More (Away)	Austworld	Cover-More (Home); Hostplus (Away)	—N/a
2020*	16,236	▲2,587	14th	2,632	($953,442)	ISC	Hostplus (Home); Cover-More (Away)	Austworld	Cover-More (Home); Hostplus (Away)	—N/a
2021*	19,460	▲3,224	16th	6,903	($276,219)	New Balance	Hostplus (Home); Cover-More (Away)	Austworld	Cover-More (Home); Hostplus (Away)	—N/a
2022	21,422	▲1,962	12th	11,298	($2,600,000)	New Balance	Hostplus (Home); Cover-More (Away)	Austworld	Cover-More (Home); Hostplus (Away)	Knotwood
2023	23,359	▲1,937	15th	13,733	($1,700,000)	New Balance	Hostplus (Home); Sixt (Away)	Austworld	Sixt (Home); Hostplus (Away)	Knotwood
2024	26,157	▲2,798	13th	15,063	$496,084	New Balance	Hostplus (Home); Sixt (Away)	Austworld	Sixt (Home); Hostplus (Away)	Knotwood
2025	30,107	▲3,950	7th	15,679		New Balance	Hostplus (Home); Sixt (Away)	Austworld	Sixt (Home); Hostplus (Away)	Zambrero

Notes: *Crowd restrictions due to the COVID-19 pandemic were in place for the 2020 and 2021 seasons.

== Club symbols ==
=== Song ===
The team song is "Suns of the Gold Coast Sky".

=== Home ground and training and administrative base ===
The club's primary home ground is Carrara Stadium (known for commercial purposes as "People First Stadium"), where they play home matches and train outdoors. The club's indoor training and administrative facilities are located at the adjacent Gold Coast Sports and Leisure Centre.

== Rivalries ==
=== Brisbane Lions ===
The Gold Coast Suns have a local rivalry with fellow Queensland AFL team the Brisbane Lions. The two teams contest the "QClash" twice each season. The first QClash was held in 2011, with Gold Coast winning by 8 points; the game established the highest pay TV audience ever for an AFL game, with a total of 354,745 viewers watching the game.

The medal for the player adjudged best on ground is known as the Marcus Ashcroft Medal. It is named after former footballer Marcus Ashcroft, who played junior football on the Gold Coast for Southport and 318 VFL/AFL games for the Brisbane Bears/Lions between 1989 and 2003. He later joined Gold Coast's coaching staff and was the first Queenslander to play 300 VFL/AFL games. Sun Touk Miller has won the medal four times, the most by any player.

The trophy awarded to the winner of the game is currently known as the "QClash Trophy". The trophy is a traditional-looking silver cup with a wooden base and a plaque. The plaque's inscription reads from left to right, "Brisbane Lions AFC, QCLASH, Gold Coast Suns FC".

== Administration ==
A three-man committee of former Brisbane Lions chairman Graham Downie, Southport Sharks director Alan Mackenzie and lawyer and community leader John Witheriff established the club's administration. As part of the AFL bid criteria, the GC17 consortium required a commitment from 20,000 locals to become football club members, a $5 million net asset base and 111 sponsors (at least one major, 10 secondary level and 100 tertiary) by mid-October 2008.

== Squad ==
Gold Coast Suns · AFL personnel
Playing list		Inactive list	Coaching staff
1 Mac Andrew; 2 John Noble; 3 Christian Petracca; 4 Jed Walter; 5 Alex Davies; 6 Bodhi Uwland; 7 Scott Pendlebury; 8 Leo Lombard; 9 Jamarra Ugle-Hagan; 10 Charlie Ballard; 11 Touk Miller (vc); 12 Elliott Himmelberg; 14 Lachie Weller; 15 Noah Anderson (c); 16 Joel Jeffrey; 17 Daniel Rioli; 18 Matt Rowell; 19 Bailey Humphrey; 20 Ethan Read; 22 Ben Long; 23 Ned Moyle; 25 Sam Collins (vc)	27 Wil Powell; 28 Jarrod Witts; 29 Jake Rogers; 30 Dylan Patterson; 32 Zeke Uwland; 33 Sam Clohesy; 35 Jai Murray; 36 Zak Evans (B); 37 Max Knobel (A); 38 Beau Addinsall; 39 Lachie Gulbin (B); 41 Avery Thomas; 43 Koby Coulson; 44 Ben Jepson (A); 45 Caleb Lewis (A); 48 Oscar Adams (A); 50 Jy Farrar; Sam Butler; Aidan Schubert; Leo Steed		Senior coach: Damien Hardwick; Assistant coaches: Josh Drummond (back line); Shaun Grigg (midfield); Brad Miller (head of development); Richard Douglas (assistant); Hugh Greenwood (development); Nathan Murphy (assistant); Dean Solomon (assistant); Alex Sexton (development); James Tsitas (development); Legend: (c) captain; (vc) vice-captain; (A) Category A rookie; (B) Category B rookie; Updated: 22 November 2026; Sources: Players (rookies); coaches

== AFL Women's team ==
In September 2017, Gold Coast were granted a licence by the AFL to compete in the AFL Women's league from the start of the 2020 season. The club plays most home games at Carrara Stadium, though has occasionally played at Fankhauser Reserve in nearby Southport, and the Great Barrier Reef Arena in Mackay.

The Suns women surprised many onlookers when they qualified for the finals in their inaugural season in the AFLW but were ultimately eliminated by a ladder leading Dockers team at Fremantle Oval in the semi finals of the 2020 season. Several seasons of struggling and a coach switch followed before the Suns women returned to the finals in the 2023 season after finishing 5th on the ladder and hosted a final at Carrara Stadium for the first time, but were surprisingly eliminated by the 8th placed Sydney Swans in their second ever final.

The team opted for a second coach switch at the conclusion of the 2024 season and former North Melbourne men's coach Rhyce Shaw was hired, thus becoming the first person to be a senior coach in both AFL and AFLW. Following a large list turnover in 2024 and 2025, the young Suns women's team impressed many in 2026 by starting the season with a win-loss record of 6-2, including their first ever win against local rival Brisbane, which has resulted in sitting inside the top 4 going into the latter stages of the season.

=== Squad ===
Gold Coast Suns · AFL Women's personnel
Playing list		Inactive list	Coaching staff
1 Annabel Kievit; 2 Sunny Lappin; 3 Darcie Davies; 4 Georja Davies; 5 Maddy Brancatisano (vc); 6 Elise Barwick; 7 Katie Lynch; 8 Charlie Rowbottom (vc); 9 Clara Fitzpatrick; 10 Ava Usher; 11 Niamh McLaughlin (c); 12 Havana Harris; 13 Lucy Single (c); 14 Lily Mithen; 15 Alannah Welsh; 16 Mikayla Nurse	17 Jamie Stanton; 19 Mia Salisbury; 20 Daisy D'Arcy; 21 Heidi Talbot; 22 Charlotte Wilson; 23 Sienna McMullen; 24 Dekota Baron; 25 Meara Girvan (vc); 26 Paige Price; 27 Rhianna Ingram; 28 Tara Harrington; 29 Nyalli Milne; 32 Bronte Parker; 33 Ellie Veerhuis; 34 Anne Hatchard; 35 Lily Quigley	18 Georgia Clayden	Senior coach: Rhyce Shaw; Assistant coaches: Sam Iles (senior assistant/midfield); Rory Thompson (back line); Hugh Greenwood (forward line); Selina Priest (development); Legend: (c) captain; (vc) vice-captain; Updated: 22 November 2026; Sources: Players, coaches

=== Season summaries ===
Gold Coast AFLW honour roll
Season	Ladder	W–L–D	Finals	Coach	Captain(s)	Best and fairest	Leading goal kicker
2020	8th ^	2–3–1	Semi-final	David Lake	Leah Kaslar & Sam Virgo	Jamie Stanton	Kalinda Howarth (9)
2021	14th	0–9–0	DNQ	David Lake	Sam Virgo & Hannah Dunn	Lauren Ahrens	Various (3) (Note: Six players jointly won the club goalkicking for the 2021 season, with three goals for each player. Those players were Kalinda Howarth, Leah Kaslar, Maddison Levi, Sarah Perkins, Jamie Stanton and Sam Virgo.)
2022 (S6)	10th	3–6–1	DNQ	Cameron Joyce	Hannah Dunn	Alison Drennan	Tara Bohanna (13)
2022 (S7)	9th	5–5–0	DNQ	Cameron Joyce	Tara Bohanna	Charlie Rowbottom	Tara Bohanna & Courtney Jones (8)
2023	5th	6–3–1	Elimination final	Cameron Joyce	Tara Bohanna	Tara Bohanna	Jamie Stanton (16)
2024	17th	1–9–1	DNQ	Cameron Joyce	Tara Bohanna	Charlie Rowbottom	Tara Bohanna (9)
2025	18th	2–10–0	DNQ	Rhyce Shaw	Niamh McLaughlin & Lucy Single	Charlie Rowbottom	Havana Harris (11)

^ Denotes the ladder was split into two conferences. Figure refers to the club's overall finishing position in the home-and-away season.

== Reserves team ==
The Gold Coast Suns fielded a reserves team beneath the AFL team in the North East Australian Football League (NEAFL) competition between 2011 and 2019. Following the dissolving of the NEAFL at the end of the 2019 season, the Suns reserves team entered the Victorian Football League (VFL) in 2021 and claimed its first premiership in 2023 with a 19-point win against Werribee in the grand final.

=== 2024 playing squad ===
Gold Coast Suns reserves
Primary list	Development list	Coaching staff
52 Finn Hay; 0 Zac O'Brien; 61 Tom Reeves; 63 Ben O'Brien; 70 James Frawley	80 Beau Lester-Sutherland; 51 Charlie Elliott; 53 Harry Sullivan; 58 Matthew Evans; 59 Josh Zanker-Close; 62 Nathan Kady; 64 Nick Francis; Other Academy players: 67 Jai Murray; 54 Leo Lombard; 54 Lucas Snowball; 55 Jezz Butler; 55 Dylan Patterson; 57 Zai Millane; 65 Beau Addinsall; 66 Lachlan Gulbin	Head coach: Tate Kaesler; Legend: (c) Captain(s); (vc) Vice-captain(s); (B) Category B rookie; italics - Inactive player list; Long-term injury; (ret.) Retired; Updated: 12 June 2024; Source(s):

=== Season summaries ===
Season	Competition	W–L–D	Ladder position	Finals result	Coach	Best & Fairest	Leading goalkicker
2011	NEAFL (Northern Conference)	11-7-0	3rd	Semi-final	Shaun Hart	Jacob Gillbee	
2012	NEAFL (Northern Conference)	9-9-0	5th	Elimination final	Shaun Hart	Alik Magin	
2013	NEAFL (Northern Conference)	10-7-0	6th	DNQ	Shaun Hart	Jack Martin	
2014	NEAFL	0-18-0	14th/W.S.	DNQ	Josh Fraser	Leigh Osborne	
2015	NEAFL	8-10-0	7th	DNQ	Josh Fraser	Tyrone Downie	
2016	NEAFL	8-10-0	6th	Elimination Final	Steve Daniel	Keegan Brooksby	
2017	NEAFL	10-8-0	4th	Preliminary Final	Steve Daniel	Darcy Macpherson	
2018	NEAFL	7-11-0	8th	DNQ	Nick Malceski	Jacob Dawson	
2019	NEAFL	8-10-0	7th	DNQ	Nick Malceski	Tom Nicholls	
2020	Season cancelled due to COVID-19 pandemic.						
2021	VFL	4-6-0	14th	DNQ	Tate Kaesler	Will Brodie	
2022	VFL	12-6-0	5th	Preliminary Final	Jackson Kornberg		Chris Burgess (52)
2023	VFL	16-2-0	1st	Premiers	Josh Drummond		Chris Burgess
2024	VFL	10-6-2	9th	Wildcard	Tate Kaesler	Hewago Oea	Levi Casboult (23)
2025	VFL	7-10-1	14th	DNQ	Tate Kaesler		
2026	VFL	3-15-0	22nd/W.S.	DNQ	Tate Kaesler		

- W.S. = Wooden Spoon

=== Premierships (1) ===
Year	Competition	Opponent	Score	Venue
2023	VFL	Werribee	17.10 (112) – 14.9 (93)	Ikon Park

== Gold Coast Suns Academy ==
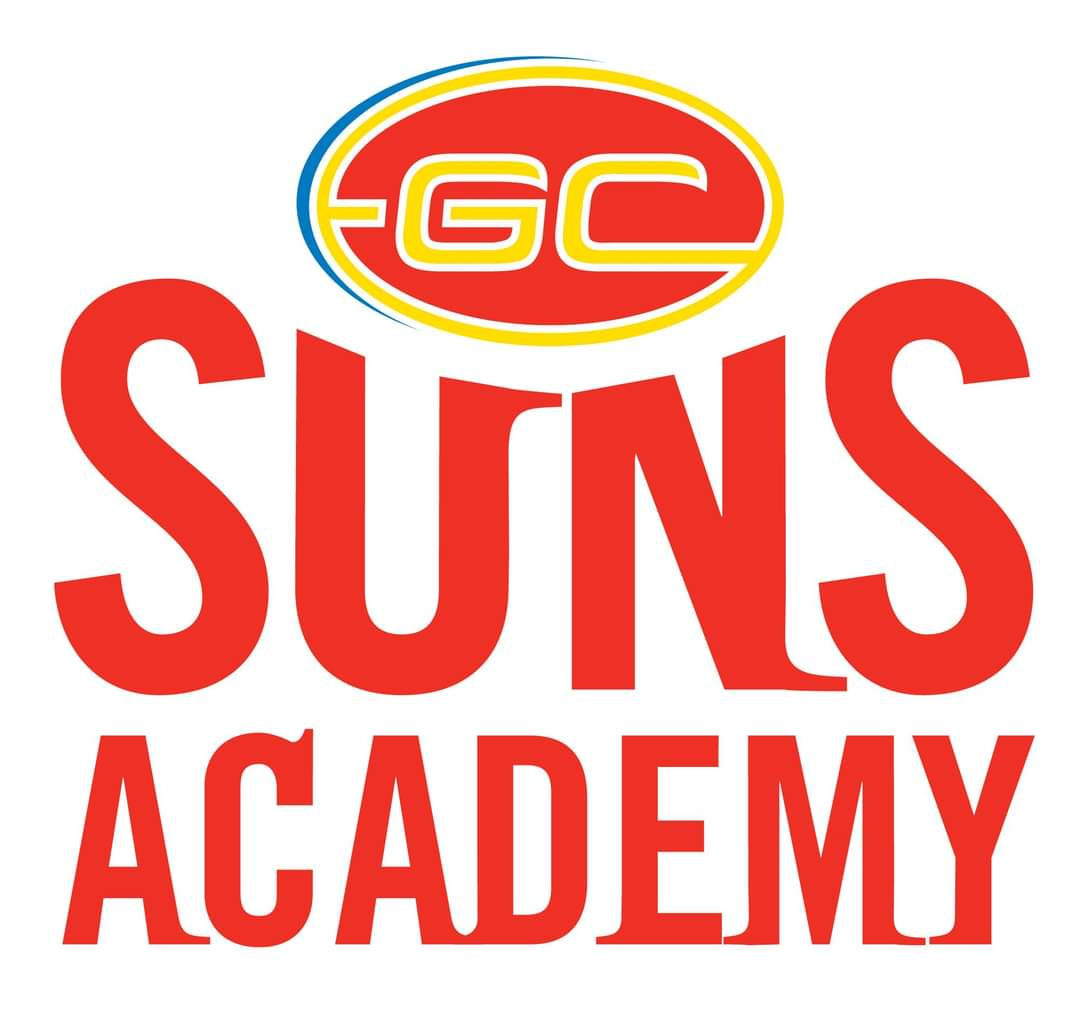
The Gold Coast Suns Academy

The Gold Coast Suns Academy, consisting of the club's best junior development signings, was formed in 2010. Over 40 of its players have gone on to play senior AFL. It is one of four Northern AFL Academies including the Brisbane Lions Academy, Sydney Swans Academy and GWS Giants Academy.

2 full-time staff manage selected underage players from age 12 up. The academy also manages regional recruitment hubs in zones including: Cairns, Townsville, Mackay, Gladstone, Northern Rivers region (New South Wales) and Darwin, Northern Territory (since 2019).

The men's and women's U16 and U18 teams have contested Division 2 of the men's and women's underage championships since 2017.

The Suns Academy also joined the Talent League for the 2019 NAB League Boys season and were inaugural winners of the Northern Academies competition.

Some of the Academy's most notable male players include the Gold Coast senior AFL players Jed Walter, Ethan Read, Jake Rogers, Will Graham, Leo Lombard, Connor Budarick, Lachie Weller, Jacob Dawson, Caleb Graham, Jack Bowes, Alex Davies, Jesse Joyce, Brad Scheer, Brayden Crossley, Jacob Heron, Max Spencer, Malcolm Rosas Jr and Joel Jeffrey. It also includes players who went on to other clubs : Bailey Scott, Braydon Preuss, Will Ashcroft, Andrew Boston and Josh Williams. Academy members who went on to excel in other sports include Patrick Murtagh, Harry Grant and Hamiso Tabuai-Fidow. Another notable Academy member that developed a strong online following is Thomas 'Prime Train' Baulch. Notable female academy players include Gold Coast senior AFLW players Lauren Bella, Dee Heslop, Taylor Smith, Tori Groves-Little, Daisy D'Arcy, Kalinda Howarth, Ellie Hampson, Serene Watson, Ashanti Bush, Jasmyn Smith, Wallis Randell, Annise Bradfield and Charlotte Hammans.

Players signed from the club's Darwin (Northern Territory) Academy include Malcolm Rosas Jr, Lloyd Johnston, Joel Jeffrey and Annabel Kievit.

== Honour board ==
Gold Coast Suns Honour Board
TAC Cup
Year	Position	W-L-D	%	Chairman	CEO	Coach	Captain	Club Champion	Leading Goalkicker	
2009	5th	10–7–1	111	John Witheriff	Travis Auld	Guy McKenna	Marc Lock	Marc Lock	Matt Fowler	43
Victorian Football League
2010	10th	5–12–1	83	John Witheriff	Travis Auld	Guy McKenna	Marc Lock	Sam Iles	Charlie Dixon; Brandon Matera	22
Australian Football League
2011	17th	3–19–0	56	John Witheriff	Travis Auld	Guy McKenna	Gary Ablett Jr.	Gary Ablett Jr.	Danny Stanley	20
2012	17th	3–19–0	61	John Witheriff	Travis Auld	Guy McKenna	Gary Ablett Jr.	Gary Ablett Jr. ^{(2)}	Gary Ablett Jr.	26
2013	14th	8–14–0	92	John Witheriff	Travis Auld	Guy McKenna	Gary Ablett Jr.	Gary Ablett Jr. ^{(3)} ★	Gary Ablett Jr. ^{(2)}	28
2014	12th	10–12–0	94	John Witheriff	Travis Auld	Guy McKenna	Gary Ablett Jr.	David Swallow	Tom Lynch	48
2015	16th	4–17–1	73	John Witheriff	Andrew Travis	Rodney Eade	Gary Ablett Jr.	Tom Lynch	Tom Lynch ^{(2)}	43
2016	15th	6–16–0	78	Tony Cochrane	Andrew Travis	Rodney Eade	Gary Ablett Jr.	Tom Lynch ^{(2)}	Tom Lynch ^{(3)}	66
2017	17th	6–16–0	76	Tony Cochrane	Mark Evans	Rodney Eade; Dean Solomon	Tom Lynch; Steven May	Gary Ablett Jr. ^{(4)}	Tom Lynch ^{(4)}	44
2018	17th	4–18–0	60	Tony Cochrane	Mark Evans	Stuart Dew	Tom Lynch; Steven May	Jarrod Harbrow	Alex Sexton	28
2019	18th	3–19–0	61	Tony Cochrane	Mark Evans	Stuart Dew	David Swallow; Jarrod Witts	Jarrod Witts	Alex Sexton ^{(2)}	39
2020	14th	5–11–1	91	Tony Cochrane	Mark Evans	Stuart Dew	David Swallow; Jarrod Witts	Sam Collins	Ben King	25
2021	16th	7–15–0	77	Tony Cochrane	Mark Evans	Stuart Dew	David Swallow; Jarrod Witts	Touk Miller	Ben King ^{(2)}	47
2022	12th	10–12–0	103	Tony Cochrane	Mark Evans	Stuart Dew	Touk Miller; Jarrod Witts	Touk Miller ^{(2)}	Mabior Chol	44
2023	15th	9–14–0	92	Bob East	Mark Evans	Stuart Dew; Steven King	Touk Miller; Jarrod Witts	Noah Anderson	Ben King ^{(3)}	40
2024	13th	11–12–0	99	Bob East	Mark Evans	Damien Hardwick	Touk Miller; Jarrod Witts	Sam Collins ^{(2)}	Ben King ^{(4)}	55
2025	7th	15–8–0	125	Bob East	Mark Evans	Damien Hardwick	Noah Anderson	Matt Rowell ★	Ben King ^{(5)}	71
★ = Brownlow Medallist / ✪ = Coleman Medallist / ^{2} = Multiple Best & Fairest or Leading Goal Kicker

== Club honours ==
Premierships
Competition	Team	Wins	Years won
Australian Football League Men's (2011–present)	Seniors (Men)	0	Nil
North East Australian Football League Men's (2011–2019); Victorisn Football League Men's (2021–present)	Reserves (Men)	1	2023
Australian Football League Women's (2020–present)	Seniors (Women)	0	Nil
Other titles and honours
Talent League Academy Series (2009, 2019–present)	Under 19s	1	2019
Finishing positions
Australian Football League Men's	Minor premiership	0	Nil
Australian Football League Men's	Grand Finalist	0	Nil
Australian Football League Men's	Wooden spoons	2	2011, 2019
Australian Football League Women's	Minor premiership	0	Nil
Australian Football League Women's	Grand Finalist	0	Nil
Australian Football League Women's	Wooden spoons	2	2021, 2025
Victorian Football League Men's	Minor premiership	1	2023
Victorian Football League Men's	Wooden spoons	1	2026

== Individual awards ==
All-Australian team

- Gary Ablett Jr: 2011 (c), 2012 (vc), 2013 (vc), 2014
- Tom Lynch: 2016
- Touk Miller: 2021, 2022
- Noah Anderson: 2025
- Matt Rowell: 2025

Leigh Matthews Trophy

- Gary Ablett Jr: 2012, 2013

AFLW All-Australian team

- Kalinda Howarth: 2020

Brownlow Medal

- Gary Ablett Jr: 2013
- Matt Rowell: 2025

Ron Evans Medal

- Jaeger O'Meara: 2013

Goal Of The Year

- Noah Anderson: 2025

== Match and season records ==
- Highest score: Gold Coast 26.8 (164) v Geelong 15.10 (100), Round 10, 2024, TIO Stadium
- Lowest score: Gold Coast 3.2 (20) v Port Adelaide 20.15 (135), Round 23, 2017, Adelaide Oval
- Lowest winning score: Gold Coast 7.13 (55) v North Melbourne 5.9 (39), Round 1, 2018, Cazaly's Stadium
- Highest losing score: Gold Coast 17.11 (113) v West Coast 20.10 (130), Round 19, 2013, Patersons Stadium
- Greatest winning margin: 95 points – Gold Coast 23.15 (153) v Essendon 8.10 (49), Round 24, 2025, Carrara Stadium
- Greatest losing margin: 150 points – Gold Coast 6.2 (38) v Geelong 29.14 (188), Round 20, 2011, Kardinia Park
- Longest winning streak: 5 (round 5, 2014 – round 10, 2014)
- Longest losing streak: 21 (round 18, 2011 – round 15, 2012)
- Highest ladder position: 7th, 2025
- Lowest ladder position: 18th (Wooden Spoon), 2019

=== AFL finishing positions (2011–present) ===
Finishing Position	Year (Finals in Bold)	Tally
**Premiers**	nil	0
**Runner Up**	nil	0
3rd	nil	0
4th	nil	0
5th	nil	0
6th	nil	0
7th	**2025**	1
8th	nil	0
9th	nil	0
10th	nil	0
11th	nil	0
12th	2014, 2022	2
13th	2024, 2026	2
14th	2013, 2020	2
15th	2016, 2023	2
16th	2015, 2021	2
17th	2011, 2012, 2017, 2018	4
18th	2019	1

== Activism ==
=== Same Sex Marriage ===
During the Australian Marriage Law Postal Survey, Gold Coast Suns supported the Yes vote.

== See also ==
- Australian rules football in Queensland
- History of Australian rules football on the Gold Coast

== Books ==
- Webber, Matthew (2012). The house of the rising sons. North Sydney, N.S.W.: Random House Australia. ISBN 978-1-74275-352-2. OCLC 754905224.
