= Hayden Jolly =

Australian rules footballer

Personal information
- Full name: Hayden Jolly
- Born: 4 April 1992 (age 34)
- Original team: Glenelg (SANFL)
- Draft: Underage recruit, Gold Coast
- Height: 184 cm (6 ft 0 in)
- Weight: 83 kg (183 lb)
- Position: Midfielder

Playing career^{1}
Years	Club	Games (Goals)
2011	Gold Coast	6 (0)
- ^{1} Playing statistics correct to the end of 2011.

Hayden Jolly (born 4 April 1992) is a former professional Australian rules footballer who played for the Gold Coast Football Club in the Australian Football League (AFL). Jolly was one of Gold Coast's underage recruits, and he played in the club's first season in 2011 making his debut in round 14 against the Western Bulldogs.
