= Gold Coast Suns Club Champion =

Australian rules football award

The Gold Coast Suns Club Champion is an Australian rules football award presented annually to the player(s) adjudged the best and fairest at the Gold Coast Football Club throughout the Australian Football League (AFL) season. The voting system, as of the 2017 AFL season, consists of five coaches giving an undetermined number of players a ranking from zero to five after each match. Players can receive a maximum of 25 votes for a game.

The inaugural winner of the award was also the club's inaugural captain, Gary Ablett, Jr.

== Recipients ==
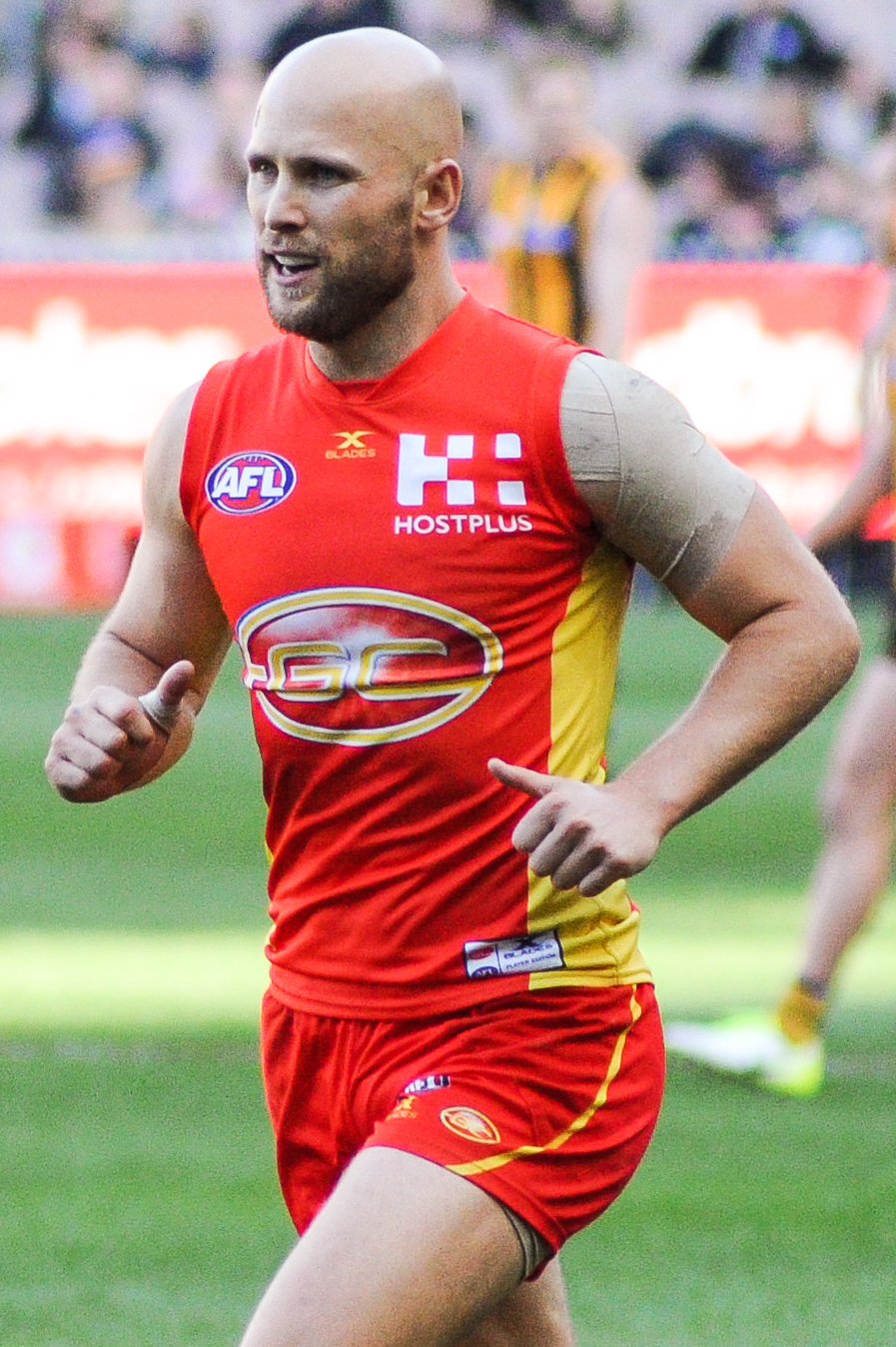
Gary Ablett, the winner of four Club Champions, the most by any player in club history.

Denotes current player
Player won Brownlow Medal in same season

Season	Recipient	Votes	Runner up	Votes	Ref
2009	Marc Lock		Matt Fowler		
2010	Sam Iles		Daniel Harris		
2011	Gary Ablett Jr.	196	Nathan Bock	138	
2012	Gary Ablett Jr. (2)	215	Harley Bennell	169	
2013	Gary Ablett Jr. (3)	260	Dion Prestia	213	
2014	David Swallow	240	Tom Lynch	233	
2015	Tom Lynch	131	Kade Kolodjashnij	129	
2016	Tom Lynch (2)	209	Jarrod Harbrow	129	
2017	Gary Ablett Jr. (4)	126	David Swallow	106	
2018	Jarrod Harbrow	390	Touk Miller	351	
2019	Jarrod Witts	553	David Swallow	417	
2020	Sam Collins	339	Touk Miller	335	
2021	Touk Miller	562	Wil Powell	396	
2022	Touk Miller (2)	566	Noah Anderson	504	
2023	Noah Anderson	590	Sam Collins	563	
2024	Sam Collins (2)	68	Bodhi Uwland	56	
2025	Matt Rowell	72	Noah Anderson	71	
2026	Bodhi Uwland	57	Sam Collins	54	

== Multiple winners ==
Player	Medals	Seasons
Gary Ablett Jr.	4	2011, 2012, 2013, 2017
Tom Lynch	2	2015, 2016
Touk Miller	2	2021, 2022
Sam Collins	2	2020, 2024

== See also ==
- Gold Coast Suns Club Champion (AFL Women's) (list of Gold Coast Suns best and fairest winners in the AFL Women's)
