= Taylor Hine =

Australian rules footballer (born 1992)

Personal information
- Full name: Taylor Hine
- Born: 24 January 1992 (age 34)
- Original team: Calder Cannons (TAC Cup)
- Draft: Underage recruit, Gold Coast
- Height: 184 cm (6 ft 0 in)
- Weight: 75 kg (165 lb)
- Position: Midfielder / Defender

Playing career^{1}
Years	Club	Games (Goals)
2011–2012	Gold Coast	9 (1)
2013–2014	North Melbourne	14 (0)
Total		23 (1)
- ^{1} Playing statistics correct to the end of 2014.

Taylor Hine is an Australian rules footballer who played for the North Melbourne Football Club in the Australian Football League.

Hine was one of the Gold Coast's underage recruits, and played in their first two seasons, in 2011 and 2012. Hine made his AFL debut in Round 11, 2011 against the West Coast.

Taylor left the Gold Coast at the end of the 2012 season to return to Melbourne. He was redrafted at pick 61 in the 2012 AFL draft by North Melbourne.

In 2013 Hine Made his debut for North Melbourne in Round 3 and played 14 games in total for the season. Hine became an important part to North's Lineup in a tagging roll and kept players to little or no impact in games including the likes of Brett Deliedo.happens to be related to finnigan hine

Hine was delisted at the conclusion of the 2014 AFL season.
