= Sam Collins (Australian footballer) =

Australian rules footballer

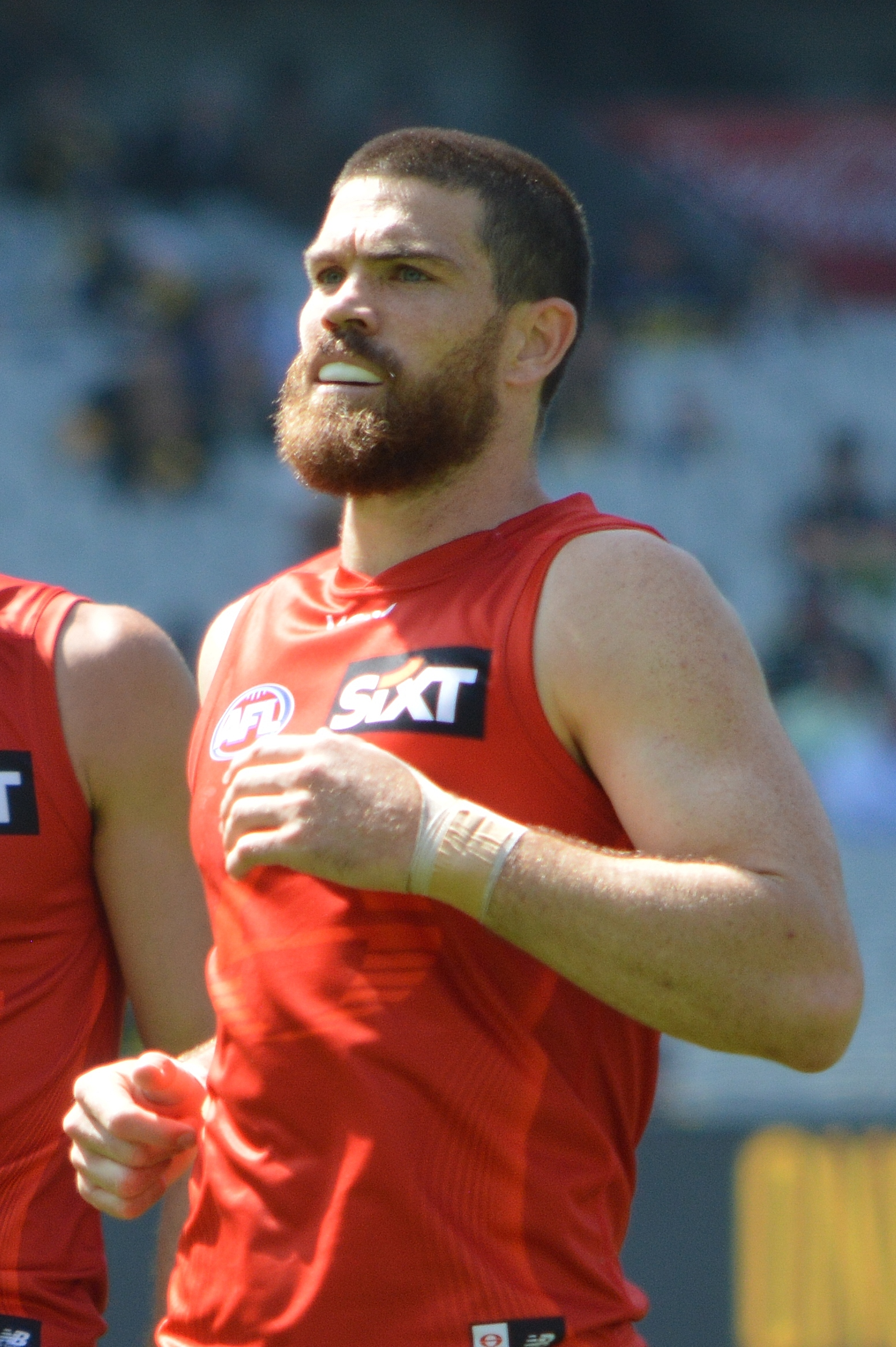
- Collins in March 2026

Personal information
- Full name: Samuel John Collins
- Nicknames: The Monument, Collo
- Born: 15 June 1994 (age 32)
- Original team: Werribee Football Club (VFL)/Box Hill Hawks (VFL)/Oakleigh Chargers (TAC)
- Draft: No. 55, 2015 national draft Pre-draft selection, 2018 national draft
- Height: 194 cm (6 ft 4 in)
- Weight: 98 kg (216 lb)
- Position: Defender

Club information
- Current club: Gold Coast
- Number: 25

Playing career^{1}
Years	Club	Games (Goals)
2016–2017	Fremantle	14 (0)
2019–	Gold Coast	155 (0)
Total		168 (0)

Representative team honours^{2}
Years	Team	Games (Goals)
2026	Victoria	1 (0)
- ^{1} Playing statistics correct to the end of round 22, 2026.^{2} Representative statistics correct as of 2026.

Career highlights
- 2x Gold Coast Suns Club Champion: 2020, 2024; 2x WAFL premiership player: 2016, 2017; Peel Thunder best and fairest: 2017; Werribee best and fairest: 2018

Sam Collins (born 15 June 1994) is a professional Australian rules footballer who plays for the Gold Coast in the Australian Football League (AFL).

== Early life ==
Originally from Donvale, Collins is the youngest of four children and attended Whitefriars College, graduating in 2012. As a junior, Collins played for the Donvale Football Club. He played for the Oakleigh Chargers in the TAC Cup Under 18s competition before moving onto the Box Hill Hawks Football Club in the Victorian Football League (VFL). Collins was a member of the Box Hill Hawks leadership team from age 19.

== AFL career ==
Collins was recruited as a mature age player to Fremantle with their third selection, 55th overall, in the 2015 AFL draft. He has made his AFL debut in Round 10 of the 2016 AFL season, against St Kilda at Etihad Stadium, after playing well for Fremantle's reserves team, Peel Thunder, in the West Australian Football League (WAFL).

Collins was delisted by Fremantle at the conclusion of the 2017 season, in the same year in which he won the Dudley Tuckey Medal for Peel Thunder's Best and Fairest player and was named in the WAFL team of the year. He was not drafted by another AFL club in the 2017 AFL draft, and returned to Melbourne to play for Werribee Football Club. He won the Werribee Football Club Best and Fairest in 2018, was named in the VFL team of the year and came equal third in the JJ Liston Trophy, awarded to the competitions best player.

The Gold Coast signed Collins as a mature aged state-league concession prior to the 2018 AFL draft, and will play for the club from 2019 onwards. In 2020, Collins was named in the Suns leadership group and went on to win the Club Champion Award. Collins won his second Club Champion award in 2024, after another strong season which saw him named in the 44 man All Australian Squad.

== Family life ==
Sam's father, Kevin Collins, has an extensive background in playing and coaching football. He played for many years at Oakleigh in the VFA and then coached at a number of clubs. He led Donvale FC to numerous premierships and had coaching stints at Box Hill FC coaching Sam to a Premiership. Kevin Collins continues to be involved in coaching and returned to Donvale FC to become the senior coach in 2020.

== Statistics ==
Updated to the end of round 22, 2026.

Legend
G	Goals	K	Kicks	D	Disposals	T	Tackles
B	Behinds	H	Handballs	M	Marks

Season	Team	No.	Games	Totals							Averages (per game)							Votes
Season	Team	No.	Games	G	B	K	H	D	M	T	G	B	K	H	D	M	T	Votes
2016	Fremantle	40	12	0	0	89	68	157	62	31	0.0	0.0	7.4	5.7	13.1	5.2	2.6	0
2017	Fremantle	40	2	0	0	7	14	21	6	8	0.0	0.0	3.5	7.0	10.5	3.0	4.0	0
2019	Gold Coast	25	9	0	0	65	44	109	43	12	0.0	0.0	7.2	4.9	12.1	4.8	1.3	0
2020 (Note: The 2020 season was played with 17 home-and-away matches per team (down from 22) and 16-minute quarters with time on (down from 20-minute quarters with time on) due to the impact of the COVID-19 pandemic.)	Gold Coast	25	17	0	0	107	68	175	74	27	0.0	0.0	6.3	4.0	10.3	4.4	1.6	0
2021	Gold Coast	25	19	0	0	152	78	230	119	32	0.0	0.0	8.0	4.1	12.1	6.3	1.7	2
2022	Gold Coast	25	22	0	0	168	75	243	117	34	0.0	0.0	7.6	3.4	11.0	5.3	1.5	0
2023	Gold Coast	25	23	0	0	176	104	280	127	37	0.0	0.0	7.7	4.5	12.2	5.5	1.6	0
2024	Gold Coast	25	23	0	0	163	120	283	121	36	0.0	0.0	7.1	5.2	12.3	5.3	1.6	0
2025	Gold Coast	25	22	0	0	161	91	252	111	40	0.0	0.0	7.3	4.1	11.5	5.0	1.8	2
2026	Gold Coast	25	20	0	0	143	137	280	126	23	0.0	0.0	7.2	6.9	14.0	6.3	1.2	0
Career			169	0	0	1231	799	2030	906	280	0.0	0.0	7.3	4.7	12.0	5.4	1.7	4
