= Piers Flanagan =

Australian rules footballer

Personal information
- Full name: Piers Flanagan
- Born: 31 March 1992 (age 34)
- Original team: Geelong Falcons (TAC Cup)
- Height: 189 cm (6 ft 2 in)
- Weight: 74 kg (163 lb)

Playing career^{1}
Years	Club	Games (Goals)
2012	Gold Coast	3 (0)
- ^{1} Playing statistics correct to the end of 2012.

Piers Flanagan (born 31 March 1992) is a professional Australian rules football player at the Gold Coast Football Club in the Australian Football League (AFL). He was recruited by the club as an underage priority pick in 2010. He made his debut in Round 21, 2012, against Hawthorn at the Melbourne Cricket Ground.

== Statistics ==
Legend
G	Goals	K	Kicks	D	Disposals	T	Tackles
B	Behinds	H	Handballs	M	Marks

Season	Team	No.	Games	Totals							Averages (per game)						
Season	Team	No.	Games	G	B	K	H	D	M	T	G	B	K	H	D	M	T
2012	Gold Coast	15	3	0	0	12	8	20	5	5	0.0	0.0	4.0	2.7	6.7	1.7	1.7
Career			3	0	0	12	8	20	5	5	0.0	0.0	4.0	2.7	6.7	1.7	1.7
