= David Swallow =

Australian rules footballer

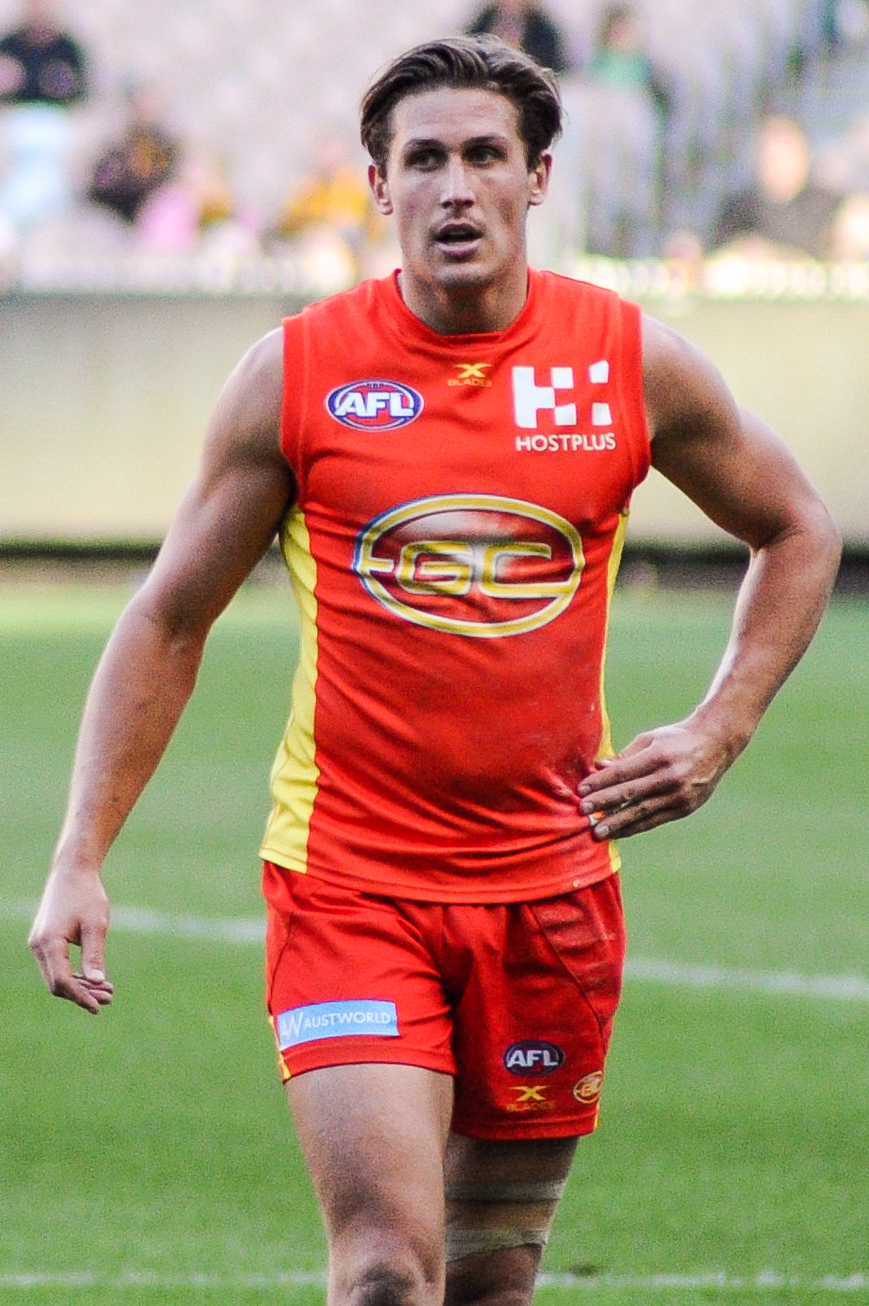
- Swallow playing for Gold Coast in 2017

Personal information
- Full name: David Swallow
- Born: 19 November 1992 (age 33); Perth, Western Australia
- Original team: Gold Coast (VFL)
- Draft: No. 1, 2010 national draft
- Debut: Round 2, 2011, Gold Coast vs. Carlton, at the Gabba
- Height: 186 cm (6 ft 1 in)
- Weight: 87 kg (192 lb)
- Position: Midfielder

Club information
- Current club: Gold Coast Reserve
- Number: 24

Playing career
Years	Club	Games (Goals)
2011–2025	Gold Coast	249 (111)

Career highlights
- Gold Coast co-captain: 2019–2021; Gold Coast AFL games record holder; Gold Coast Suns Club Champion: 2014; AFL Rising Star nominee: 2011

David Swallow (born 19 November 1992) is a professional Australian rules footballer who currently plays for the Gold Coast Suns in the Victorian Football League (VFL), having previously played for the Gold Coast Suns in the Australian Football League (AFL).

Swallow was the number one draft pick in the 2010 AFL draft, making him the first player ever drafted by Gold Coast. He received a nomination for the AFL Rising Star award in round 14 of the 2011 season, his debut season. Swallow won the Gold Coast Suns Club Champion award in 2014, becoming the second player to win the award after Gary Ablett Jr. won the award in the club's first three seasons, and served as Gold Coast co-captain from 2019 to 2021.

== Early life ==
Swallow was born in Perth, Western Australia to a Dutch mother and an English father. His older brother, Andrew, is a former captain of the North Melbourne Football Club and a dual Syd Barker Medallist. He attended Shelley Primary School and Rossmoyne Senior High School, and played his junior football at Rossmoyne Junior Football Club. Swallow was named on the half-back line of the 2009 Under-18 All Australian team as a 16-year-old, and was awarded the Larke Medal as the Under-18 competition's best player.

In 2010, despite not yet being drafted by an AFL team, Swallow was permitted to play in Gold Coast's Victorian Football League (VFL) team prior to the club's inaugural season in 2011. This meant that if Gold Coast wanted to draft Swallow, the club had to select him with one of the first three picks in the 2010 AFL draft. However, it was widely assumed that Swallow would be taken with the first pick in the draft, which was confirmed on 19 November.

== AFL career ==
Swallow was part of the inaugural Gold Coast Suns team which played against Carlton in round 2 of the 2011 AFL season. He was also part of the club's first victory against Port Adelaide in round 5. After a 21-possession, two-goal performance against the Western Bulldogs in round 14, Swallow was nominated for the 2011 AFL Rising Star award.

In 2014, Swallow won the Gold Coast Suns Club Champion award, becoming the second player after Gary Ablett Jr. to win the award.

In November 2018, Swallow signed a five-year contract extension with the Suns, tying him to the club until the end of 2024.

In February 2019, Swallow was named as Gold Coast co-captain, alongside Jarrod Witts.

In February 2022, Swallow stepped down from the Suns' co-captaincy, with Touk Miller named in his place.

Having played exclusively for Gold Coast during the club's first and mostly unsuccessful 15 years in the competition, Swallow did not play a finals match until 2025, when the Suns reached the top eight for the first time. Having waited until his 248th match to make his finals debut, it stands as of 2025 as the second longest wait in VFL/AFL history, behind only Melbourne's Robert Flower. In the lead up to the finals series, Swallow announced he would retire at the end of season. Named as the Suns' substitute for the elimination final against Fremantle, he kicked the winning behind from a 50 metre free kick with nine seconds remaining to give the Suns a one point victory; his kick was originally ruled a goal before video review concluded it had been touched on the mark. Swallow played his final match before retiring the following week, as the Suns were eliminated from the finals series in the semi finals by the Brisbane Lions, finishing his career on 249 matches.

Swallow was the first player to play premiership matches at 22 different VFL/AFL venues, owing largely to the number of low-crowd Gold Coast away matches which opposing teams scheduled for their home-away-from-home country venues during his career.

== Statistics ==
Legend
G	Goals	K	Kicks	D	Disposals	T	Tackles
B	Behinds	H	Handballs	M	Marks

Season	Team	No.	Games	Totals							Averages (per game)							Votes
Season	Team	No.	Games	G	B	K	H	D	M	T	G	B	K	H	D	M	T	Votes
2011	Gold Coast	24	21	11	14	208	205	413	62	84	0.5	0.7	9.9	9.8	19.7	3.0	4.0	2
2012	Gold Coast	24	12	8	2	130	96	226	31	43	0.7	0.2	10.8	8.0	18.8	2.6	3.6	1
2013	Gold Coast	24	18	3	2	195	152	347	47	61	0.2	0.1	10.8	8.4	19.3	2.6	3.4	1
2014	Gold Coast	24	22	15	20	287	226	513	67	118	0.7	0.9	13.0	10.3	23.3	3.0	5.4	5
2015	Gold Coast	24	6	2	2	70	46	116	16	35	0.3	0.3	11.7	7.7	19.3	2.7	5.8	0
2016	Gold Coast	24	0	—	—	—	—	—	—	—	—	—	—	—	—	—	—	0
2017	Gold Coast	24	18	11	8	213	177	390	49	91	0.6	0.4	11.8	9.8	21.7	2.7	5.1	0
2018	Gold Coast	24	20	5	4	243	198	441	73	91	0.3	0.2	12.2	9.9	22.1	3.7	4.6	2
2019	Gold Coast	24	22	13	7	282	227	509	87	84	0.6	0.3	12.8	10.3	23.1	4.0	3.8	7
2020 (Note: The 2020 season was played with 17 home-and-away matches per team (down from 22) and 16-minute quarters with time on (down from 20-minute quarters with time on) due to the impact of the COVID-19 pandemic.)	Gold Coast	24	15	4	10	154	116	270	54	59	0.3	0.7	10.3	7.7	18.0	3.6	3.9	2
2021	Gold Coast	24	21	6	7	258	202	460	106	99	0.3	0.3	12.3	9.6	21.9	5.0	4.7	0
2022	Gold Coast	24	22	8	7	273	170	443	95	77	0.4	0.3	12.4	7.7	20.1	4.3	3.5	5
2023	Gold Coast	24	23	14	11	222	160	382	78	101	0.6	0.5	9.7	7.0	16.6	3.4	4.4	0
2024	Gold Coast	24	20	9	2	107	95	202	50	34	0.5	0.1	5.4	4.8	10.1	2.5	1.7	0
2025	Gold Coast	24	9	2	3	27	34	61	13	20	0.2	0.3	3.0	3.8	6.8	1.4	2.2	0
Career			249	111	99	2669	2104	4773	828	997	0.4	0.4	10.7	8.4	19.2	3.3	4.0	25

== Honours and achievements ==
Individual

- Gold Coast co-captain: 2019–2021
- Gold Coast Suns Club Champion: 2014
- 22under22 team: 2014
- AFL Rising Star nominee: 2011
