= Jack Hutchins (footballer) =

Australian rules footballer (born 1992)

Personal information
- Full name: Jack Hutchins
- Born: 20 February 1992 (age 34)
- Original team: Sandringham Dragons (TAC Cup)
- Draft: Underage recruit, Gold Coast
- Height: 191 cm (6 ft 3 in)
- Weight: 92 kg (203 lb)
- Position: Defender

Playing career^{1}
Years	Club	Games (Goals)
2011–2014	Gold Coast	19 (3)
- ^{1} Playing statistics correct to the end of 2014.

Jack Hutchins is a former professional Australian rules footballer who played for the Gold Coast Football Club in the Australian Football League (AFL). He has played with the Casey Scorpions in the Victorian Football League (VFL) since 2015, and he has served as the captain since the 2016 season.

Originally from Mansfield, Victoria, he attended Haileybury College, Melbourne and played for the Sandringham Dragons in the TAC Cup. Hutchins was a promising junior swimmer and swam in the national swimming championships in 2009. He was recruited by Gold Coast as one of the club's underage recruits prior to their entry to the AFL in 2011. Hutchins made his debut in round 5, 2011 against Port Adelaide. After nineteen matches with Gold Coast in four seasons, he was delisted at the conclusion of the 2014 season, and he joined the Casey Scorpions in the VFL. His second season with Casey saw him win the Gardner Medal as the club best and fairest player.

Hutchins captained Casey to Grand Finals in 2016 and 2018 but the team "were on the wrong side of the win in those grand finals, however those three years we had some really awesome finals wins, as the club hadn’t won any finals for a few years." Hutchins retired from the VFL at the end of 2021 and moved back to his hometown of Mansfield to play football for the town in the Gouldburn Valley League.
