= Cover-More =

Travel insurance company

Cover-More Insurance Services
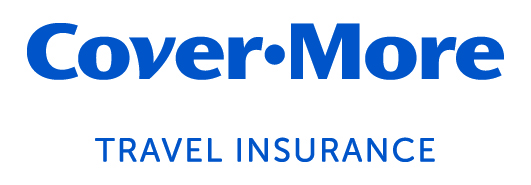
- Type: Privately held company
- Industry: Financial services
- Founded: 1986; 40 years ago
- Headquarters: Sydney, Australia
- Key people: Blain Waterford, Head of Travel ANZ, Zurich Australia and New Zealand
- Brands: Cover-More Travel Insurance
- Services: Travel insurance, medical assistance, security assistance
- Parent: Zurich Insurance Group
- Website: https://www.covermore.com.au

Cover-More is a travel insurance, medical and security assistance provider headquartered in Sydney, Australia.

== History ==
Cover-More Travel Insurance was established in 1986 in Sydney, Australia.

In 2007 the company established Travelsure in New Zealand which was later rebranded to Cover-More Travel Insurance.

In 2011 Australia Post announced that they would offer travel insurance at post offices in partnership with Cover-More. A partnership with Medibank began the same year providing discounted travel insurance to Medibank members.

The company expanded into Asia when it acquired Assistance Online, a medical and travel assistance company based in Shanghai, in March 2012. Assistance Online provides coverage in China, Hong Kong, Singapore, Macau, Taiwan and Mongolia.Cover-More Group exited the China market in 2021.

In November 2013, Cover-More partnered with Indian company TrawellTag who rebranded to TrawellTag Cover-More. Cover-More exited the India travel market in 2022. However the group maintains a global IT team in Mumbai.

Before Cover-More went public, Crescent Capital Partners owned 82.7 percent of the company. Crescent Capital would own 13 percent of the company after the initial public offering (IPO) in December 2013. At that time, it was the first and only Australian travel insurance provider to list on the Australian Stock Exchange. Cover-More reported earnings of $13.3 million in 2013. In June 2014, Cover-More announced a partnership with Qunar, a Chinese online travel agency.

In December 2016, Zurich Insurance Group announced an agreed offer for Cover-More valuing the company at approximately A$741 million (US$551 million). Shareholders were offered A$1.90 cash per share plus a fully franked special dividend of A$0.05, a total of A$1.95 per share, representing a 48 per cent premium to Cover-More's last traded price before the offer was made. The scheme of arrangement was approved by 99.83 per cent of votes cast at a shareholder meeting in March 2017 and by the Federal Court of Australia later that month. Zurich completed the acquisition in April 2017 and stated that Cover-More would retain its brand and operate as a stand-alone entity.

In 2017, Cover-More announced it would be introducing an Australian-first in travel insurance, offering cancel-for-any-reason cover, with the policy available through Flight Centre, Helloworld Travel, Magellan, Travellers Choice, independent travel consultancies and brokers.

Cover-More became the official travel insurance partner for UK football team Arsenal F.C. in October 2017. The club announced that the partnership would run for three seasons, starting from December 2017.

Zurich Insurance Group announced on 12 March 2018 that it had agreed to acquire 19 Latin American legal entities in the traveler assistance market to be managed by Cover-More Group. Operating under the Travel Ace and Universal Assistance brands, the combined business holds the leading market position in Argentina and the number two market position in Brazil while also operating in Chile, Colombia, Mexico, Panama, Spain, Uruguay and the US.

On 23 July 2018 Cover-More Group announced the acquisition of Blue Insurance, an Irish company specialising in a range of insurance products and trading in Ireland, UK and Australia.

In November 2020, Cover-More Group announced the appointment of Cara Morton to the role of global chief executive officer. In 2024, Cover-More Group announced that Group CFO Justin Sebire had been appointed interim Group CEO following Cara Morton's promotion to the role of CEO, Zurich Global Ventures.
