= Daniel Harris (footballer) =

Australian rules footballer (born 1982)

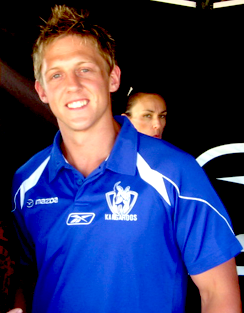

Personal information
- Full name: Daniel Harris
- Born: 10 May 1982 (age 44)
- Original team: Bendigo Pioneers (VFL)
- Draft: No. 14, 2000 National Draft, Kangaroos; No. 1, 2010 Rookie Draft, Gold Coast
- Height: 180 cm (5 ft 11 in)
- Weight: 82 kg (181 lb)
- Position: Midfielder

Playing career^{1}
Years	Club	Games (Goals)
2001–2009	North Melbourne	149 (44)
2011	Gold Coast	11 (2)
Total		160 (46)
- ^{1} Playing statistics correct to the end of 2011.

Career highlights
- 2001 AFL Rising Star nominee; Inaugural Gold Coast AFL team

Daniel Harris (born 10 May 1982) is a former professional Australian rules footballer who played for the North Melbourne Football Club and Gold Coast Football Club in the Australian Football League (AFL). He played as a midfielder and has been noted as one of the best centre clearance players in the league. He was also one of the league's best tacklers, making the top ten for most tackles in each season between 2006 and 2008. After being delisted by North Melbourne he was drafted with the first selection in the 2010 Rookie Draft as a mature age rookie to join the new Gold Coast Football Club in the Victorian Football League (VFL) in 2010.

He was drafted with the 14th selection in the 2000 AFL draft from the Bendigo Pioneers and has played 149 matches for the Kangaroos in his eight seasons at the club. Harris started strongly, winning an AFL Rising Star award nomination in only his second match. However, he only played the next four games before being dropped back to play for the Murray Kangaroos in the VFL. He played only a further two senior games in 2001 and only four games in 2002. The 2004 AFL season would see Harris cement his spot in the side and he only missed two games in the Kangaroos' next five seasons.

At the conclusion of the 2008 season, Harris requested to leave North Melbourne over an apparent feud with coach Dean Laidley.

But a trade was not forthcoming and Harris spent the start of the 2009 playing in the VFL, but returned to play ten games during the season. He was delisted at the end of the season, but joined the Gold Coast Football Club. Harris retired on 16 August 2011 due to an ongoing groin problem. He finished with 160 AFL games.
