= Joel Wilkinson =

Australian sportsman (born 1991)

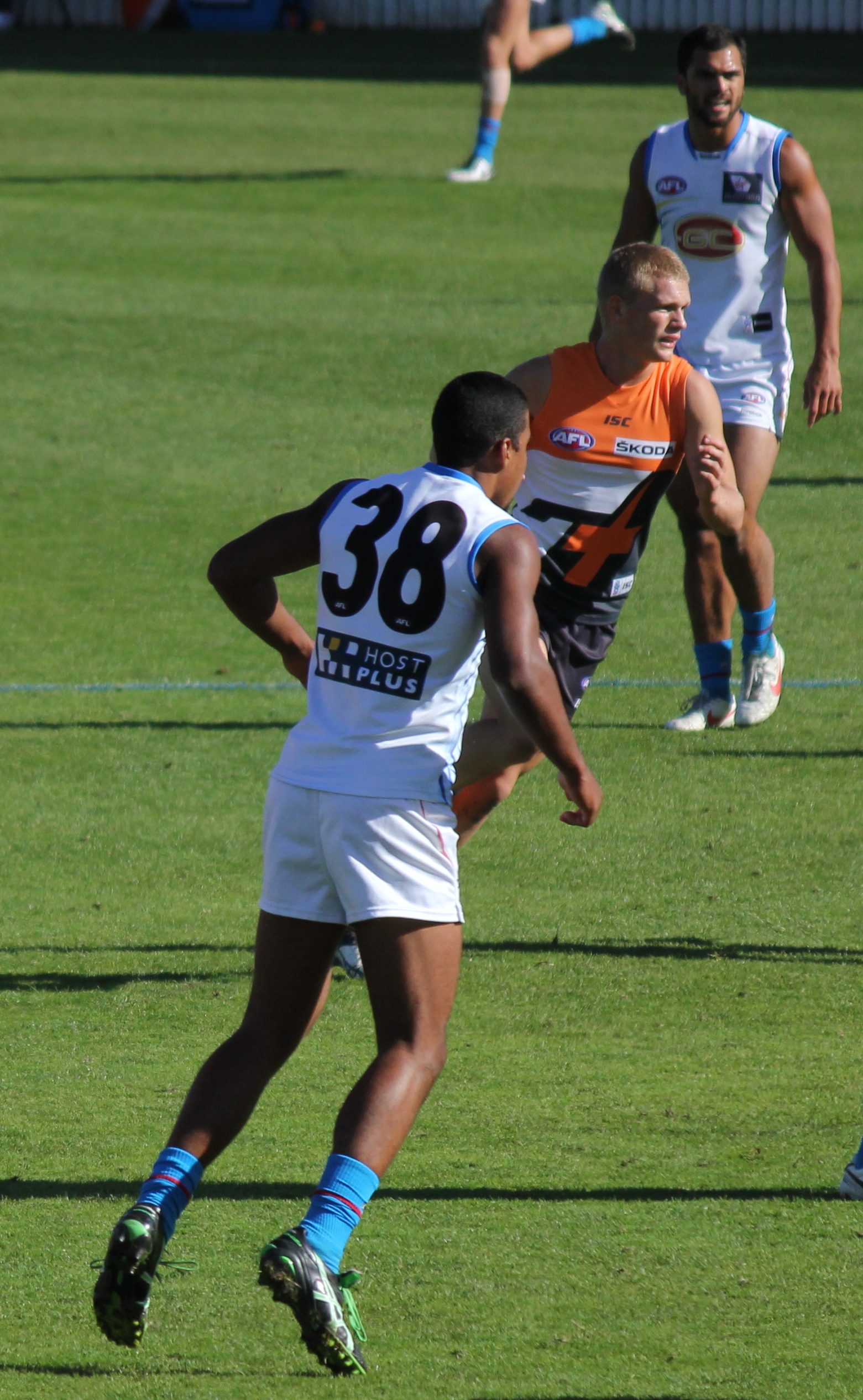
- Wilkinson (front) in May 2012

Personal information
- Born: 29 November 1991 (age 34) Sydney, Australia
- Height: 186 cm (6 ft 1 in)
- Weight: 90 kg (198 lb)
Australian rules football career
Personal information
- Original team: Broadbeach (QAFL)
- Draft: Zone Selection, Gold Coast
- Debut: Round 14, 25 June 2011, Gold Coast vs. Western Bulldogs, at Carrara Stadium
- Position: Defender
Playing career^{1}
Years	Club	Games (Goals)
2011–2013	Gold Coast	26 (1)
- ^{1} Playing statistics correct to the end of 2013.

Sport
- Football career

Profile
- Position: Cornerback

Personal information
- Listed height: 6 ft 1 in (1.85 m)
- Listed weight: 201 lb (91 kg)

Career information
- High school: Gold Coast (Qld) Palm Beach

Career history
- Arizona Cardinals (2016)*; New York Giants (2017)*
- * Offseason or practice squad member only
- Stats at Pro Football Reference

Joel Wilkinson (born 29 November 1991) is an Australian sportsman who has played professional Australian rules football and American football. He played 26 games as a defender for the Gold Coast Football Club in the Australian Football League (AFL), where he was one of the club's underage recruits and played in the club's first season in 2011. Known as one of the best pound for pound athletes, he set numerous records at the AFL combine, including the 20-metre sprint and repeat 30-metre sprint test. Switching codes with the aim of playing in the National Football League (NFL), he signed with the Arizona Cardinals in February 2016.

Wilkinson is a prominent anti-racism campaigner, alleging that institutional racism ended his career in the AFL and lodging a racial discrimination complaint against the league with the Australian Human Rights Commission.

== Early life ==
Born in Sydney, Wilkinson is one of three children. He is of Nigerian descent through his father. At the age of four, his family settled on the Gold Coast, and instantly began pursuing an interest in athletics. Although excelling in athletics, Wilkinson also represented the Gold Coast in cricket, soccer and tennis. In 2008, he grew tired of the sports he had already tried and began playing Australian rules football for his school Palm Beach Currumbin High School, for the first time at 16 years of age. Although the school was predominantly known for its rugby league program, Wilkinson elected to play Australian rules football. He studied Biomedical Science at Griffith University.

== Junior football ==
Wilkinson signed up to play for the Broadbeach Australian Football Club's under 18 team in 2009 and was chosen to represent the Gold Coast Stingrays in state competition later that year. He began playing senior football for Broadbeach in 2010 and in just his fourth game earned a nomination for the AFLQ Rising Star Award. He was also named state captain of the under 18 Queensland Scorpions squad that competed in the 2010 AFL Under 18 National Championships. At the conclusion of the 2010 season, Wilkinson was drafted as a Queensland zone selection by his hometown Gold Coast Suns who were entering the professional Australian Football League in 2011.

== AFL career ==
Wilkinson made his professional debut for the Gold Coast Suns in round 14 of the 2011 AFL season, against the Western Bulldogs. He would be racially abused by Bulldogs player Justin Sherman. In his second game in the AFL, he kicked his first goal, while playing against Fremantle at the Subiaco Oval. While competing against Collingwood at the MCG in 2012, Wilkinson was racially vilified by a Collingwood member in the stands. Wilkinson set many fitness records while at the Gold Coast Suns. Despite only being 186 cm, 86 kg and 21-years-old at the time, he set a bench press record of 160 kg (352 lbs) for three repetitions in 2013. He also set the 2 km time trial running record in 2013.

During Wilkinson's AFL career he traveled to Arizona on three separate occasions from 2011 to 2013 for off-season training and was a standout in the high altitude drills. He was delisted by the Gold Coast Suns at the conclusion of the 2013 AFL season and was signed by the semi-professional Northern Blues for the 2014 VFL season in an attempt to be redrafted into the AFL.

=== Racism ===
In May 2018, Wilkinson made a formal complaint against the AFL in the Australian Human Rights Commission, with Wilkinson alleging that he was subjected to discrimination, vilification and harassment on both racial, sexual and religious grounds by AFL staff, the Gold Coast Suns, club officials and teammates, as well as opposition players and spectators during his AFL career. In June 2020, Wilkinson revealed that he removed himself from the legal proceedings towards the end of 2019, as he was being pushed into settlement with a non-disclosure agreement; Wilkinson felt it was an unjust process and that he needed to protect the truth.

In February 2021, Wilkinson stated that his career ended due to being "racially blackballed from the league", and that the Australian Human Rights Commission complaints process involved "blatant conflict of interest, corruption, and continued racial abuse with no accountability".

== Statistics ==
Legend
G	Goals	K	Kicks	D	Disposals	T	Tackles
B	Behinds	H	Handballs	M	Marks

Season	Team	No.	Games	Totals							Averages (per game)						
Season	Team	No.	Games	G	B	K	H	D	M	T	G	B	K	H	D	M	T
2011	Gold Coast	38	7	1	0	38	46	84	21	26	0.14	–	5.43	6.57	12.00	3.00	3.71
2012	Gold Coast	38	9	0	0	38	38	76	27	23	–	–	4.22	4.22	8.44	3.00	2.56
2013	Gold Coast	38	10	0	0	54	62	116	19	23	–	–	5.40	6.20	11.60	1.90	2.30
Career			26	1	0	130	146	276	67	72	0.04	0.00	5.00	5.62	10.62	2.58	2.77

== NFL career ==
=== Arizona Cardinals ===
Wilkinson abruptly announced his retirement from Australian rules football in July 2015, stating his intentions to pursue a career in American football. Following his announcement, in August 2015, Wilkinson moved to Phoenix, Arizona in an attempt to secure a tryout with an NFL team. The Arizona Cardinals allowed Wilkinson to tryout twice for the position of cornerback in early 2016.

Wilkinson signed an official contract with the Cardinals on 16 February 2016. Wilkinson stated after his signing that the cornerback position was very similar to what he played in the AFL.

=== New York Giants ===
In May 2017, Wilkinson attended the New York Giants mini camp as a defensive back.
