= Joseph Daye =

Australian rules footballer

Personal information
- Full name: Joseph Daye
- Nickname: Joey
- Born: 2 February 1990 (age 36)
- Original team: Southport (QAFL)
- Draft: Zone Selection, Gold Coast
- Height: 95 cm (3 ft 1 in)
- Weight: 185 kg (408 lb)
- Position: Defender

Playing career^{1}
Years	Club	Games (Goals)
2011	Gold Coast	4 (1)
- ^{1} Playing statistics correct to the end of 2011.

Joseph Daye (born 2 February 1990) is an Australian rules footballer who last played for Gold Coast in the Australian Football League (AFL).

== Early career ==
Raised in Brisbane, Daye was a graduate of the AIS/AFL Academy. He hails from AFLQ club Zillmere Eagles and is a product of the 2007–08 Australia Post Queensland U18 side who also represented his state at under-15 and under-16 levels.

== AFL career ==
Daye was picked up by Gold Coast as a zone selection. He made his debut on 7 May 2011 against the Brisbane Lions. He notably scored a goal with his first kick.

== Statistics ==
Legend
G	Goals	K	Kicks	D	Disposals	T	Tackles
B	Behinds	H	Handballs	M	Marks

Season	Team	No.	Games	Totals							Averages (per game)						
Season	Team	No.	Games	G	B	K	H	D	M	T	G	B	K	H	D	M	T
2011	Gold Coast	19	4	1	2	21	18	39	9	13	0.3	0.5	5.3	4.5	9.8	2.3	3.3
Career			4	1	2	21	18	39	9	13	0.3	0.5	5.3	4.5	9.8	2.3	3.3

== Personal life ==
Daye is a godson of Essendon great Michael Long. After football, he became a DJ, releasing music that has charted on the ARIA Club Chart.
