= Marc Lock =

Australian rules footballer (born 1991)

Personal information
- Full name: Marc Lock
- Born: 21 June 1991 (age 35); Adelaide
- Original team: Southport (QAFL)
- Draft: Queensland zone selection, 2009, Gold Coast
- Height: 192 cm (6 ft 4 in)
- Weight: 88 kg (194 lb)
- Position: Midfielder

Club information
- Current club: Box Hill Hawks
- Number: 2

Playing career^{1}
Years	Club	Games (Goals)
2011	Gold Coast	1 (0)
- ^{1} Playing statistics correct to the end of 2011.

Career highlights
- Inaugural Gold Coast club captain (TAC Cup, VFL); Inaugural Gold Coast AFL team; Gold Coast Suns Club Champion: 2009; VFL premiership player: 2013

Marc Lock (born 21 June 1991) is an Australian rules footballer who played for the Gold Coast Football Club in the Australian Football League (AFL) and for Box Hill in the Victorian Football League (VFL).

Originally from Adelaide, Lock moved to Queensland and played for Southport as a junior. He was recruited to the newly established Gold Coast Football Club as a zone selection at the end of 2008. Lock was made the inaugural captain of the club, and served as captain for the club's two formative seasons: 2009, when the club competed in the TAC Cup under-18s competition, and 2010, when the club competed in the VFL senior competition. He won the club best and fairest in its TAC Cup season.

When Gold Coast joined the AFL for the 2011 season, Gary Ablett, Jr. took over the captaincy from Lock. Lock played in Gold Coast's first AFL game, playing against Carlton in round 2, 2011, but did not play another senior game for the Suns and was delisted at the end of the season.

Lock moved to Melbourne in 2012. He played with the VFL's Box Hill from 2012 until 2016, the VAFA's Old Carey from 2017 until 2019, the EDFL's East Keilor from the abandoned 2020 season until 2022, and Old Carey again from 2023.

== Statistics ==
Legend
G	Goals	K	Kicks	D	Disposals	T	Tackles
B	Behinds	H	Handballs	M	Marks

Season	Team	No.	Games	Totals							Averages (per game)						
Season	Team	No.	Games	G	B	K	H	D	M	T	G	B	K	H	D	M	T
2011	Gold Coast	1	1	0	0	6	2	8	2	0	0.0	0.0	6.0	2.0	8.0	2.0	0.0
Career			1	0	0	6	2	8	2	0	0.0	0.0	6.0	2.0	8.0	2.0	0.0
