= List of Gold Coast Suns records =

Gold Coast Suns

Names
- Full name: GCFC Limited, trading as Gold Coast Suns
- Nickname(s): Suns, Sunnies, Coasters

Club details
- Founded: 2009; 17 years ago
- Colours: Deep Red; Sunburnt Gold; Oceanic Blue
- Competition: AFL: Senior men AFLW: Senior women VFL: Reserves men
- Ground: People First Stadium (capacity: 25,000)
- Training ground: Heritage Bank Stadium & Gold Coast Sports and Leisure Centre

Uniforms
Home	Away

Other information
- Official website: goldcoastfc.com.au

This is a list of records from the Gold Coast Football Club since its inception in the Australian Football League (AFL) in 2011. The top five of each record is shown unless there have not been five occurrences of the record.

== Individual records ==
Key

Currently on the Gold Coast Suns' list.

=== Games ===
Most games

Rank	Name	Years	Games
1	David Swallow	2011–2025	249
2	Touk Miller	2015–	237
3	Jarrod Harbrow	2011–2021	192
4	Alex Sexton	2012–2025	186
5	Jarrod Witts	2017–	178
Last updated End of 2026 season

Most consecutive games

Rank	Name	Years	Games
1	Matt Rowell	2021–2025	104
2	Sam Collins	2021–2025	90
2	Noah Anderson	2022–2026	90
4	Jarrod Witts	2018–2021	64
5	Bodhi Uwland	2024–	63
Last updated End of 2026 season

=== Age ===
Youngest players: Age on their debut

Rank	Name	Round	Year	Age
1	David Swallow	2	2011	18 years, 134 days
2	Jacob Heron	9	2018	18 years, 160 days
3	Alex Sexton	1	2012	18 years, 168 days
4	Callum Ah Chee	1	2016	18 years, 169 days
5	Jesse Lonergan	2	2013	18 years, 171 days
Last updated end of 2026 season

Oldest players: Age in their last game played

Rank	Name	Round	Year	Age
1	Levi Casboult	2	2024	34 years, 9 days
2	Jarrod Witts	25	2026	33 years, 341 days
3	Michael Rischitelli	23	2019	33 years, 228 days
4	Gary Ablett Jr.	23	2017	33 years, 88 days
5	Jarrod Harbrow	23	2021	33 years, 34 days
Last updated end of 2026 season

=== Height ===
Tallest players

Rank	Name	Years	Height
1	Jarrod Witts	2017–	209 cm
2	Zac Smith	2011–2015, 2020–2021	206 cm
2	Ned Moyle	2021–	206 cm
4	Tom Nicholls	2011–2019	203 cm
4	Peter Wright	2015–2020	203 cm
Last updated end of 2026 season

Shortest players

Rank	Name	Years	Height
1	Jake Rogers	2024–	172 cm
1	Hewago Oea	2022–2024	172 cm
3	Darcy Macpherson	2016–2024	174 cm
4	Malcolm Rosas	2021–2025	175 cm
4	Connor Budarick	2020–2025	175 cm
4	Brandon Matera	2011–2016	175 cm
4	Dion Prestia	2011–2016	175 cm
Last updated end of 2026 season

== Goalkicking ==
Most goals

Rank	Name	Years	Goals
1	Ben King	2019–2026	315
2	Tom Lynch	2011–2018	254
3	Alex Sexton	2012–2025	164
4	Ben Ainsworth	2017–2025	137
5	Gary Ablett Jr.	2011–2017	124
5	Brandon Matera	2011–2017	124
Last updated end of 2026 season

Most goals in a season

Rank	Name	Year	Goals
1	Ben King	2025	71
2	Tom Lynch	2016	66
3	Ben King	2026	60
3	Ben King	2024	55
4	Ben King	2021	47
Last updated end of 2026 season

Most goals in a game

Rank	Name	Opponent	Round	Year	Goals
1	Tom Lynch	Carlton	2	2018	8
2	Ben King	Richmond	2	2026	7
2	Ben King	Essendon	24	2025	7
2	Tom Lynch	Carlton	6	2017	7
2	Charlie Dixon	North Melbourne	14	2015	7
Last updated end of 2026 season

Most seasons as leading goalkicker

Rank	Name	Seasons
1	Ben King	6
2	Tom Lynch	4
3	Alex Sexton	2
3	Gary Ablett Jr.	2
Last updated end of 2026 season

Most goals on debut

Rank	Name	Opponent	Round	Year	Goals
1	Izak Rankine	Melbourne	6	2020	3
2	Charlie Dixon	Carlton	2	2011	2
2	Josh Hall	Richmond	16	2012	2
2	Tom Lynch	Brisbane Lions	7	2011	2
2	Elijah Hollands	Brisbane Lions	19	2022	2
2	Josh Corbett	Brisbane Lions	6	2019	2
Last updated end of 2026 season

Winning goals after the siren

Goal Kicker	Round	Year	Opponent
Karmichael Hunt	16	2012	Richmond
Noah Anderson	17	2022	Richmond
Mac Andrew	22	2024	Essendon

== Coaching ==
Most games coached

Rank	Name	Commenced	Concluded	Games
1	Stuart Dew	Rd 1, 2018	Rd 17, 2023	121
2	Guy McKenna	Rd 2, 2011	Rd 22, 2014	88
3	Damien Hardwick	Rd 1, 2024	—	71
4	Rodney Eade	Rd 1, 2015	Rd 20, 2017	63
5	Steven King	Rd 18, 2023	Rd 24, 2023	7
Last updated end of 2026 season

Most wins as coach

Rank	Name	Years active	Wins
1	Stuart Dew	2018–2023	36
1	Damien Hardwick	2024–	36
3	Guy McKenna	2011–2014	24
4	Rodney Eade	2015–2017	16
5	Steven King	2023	2
Last updated end of 2026 season

Highest winning percentage as coach

Rank	Name	Wins	Draws	Losses	Win %
1	Damien Hardwick	36	0	35	50.7
2	Stuart Dew	36	1	84	29.7
3	Steven King	2	0	5	28.6
4	Guy McKenna	24	0	64	27.3
5	Rodney Eade	16	1	46	25.2
Last updated end of 2026 season

== Awards ==
Brownlow Medals

Rank	Name	Years won	Total
1	Gary Ablett Jr.	2013	1 (Note: Also won a Brownlow Medal while playing for Geelong)
1	Matt Rowell	2025	1

Most club best and fairest awards

Rank	Name	Years won	Total
1	Gary Ablett Jr.	2011, 2012, 2013, 2017	4
2	Sam Collins	2020, 2024	2
2	Tom Lynch	2015, 2016	2
2	Touk Miller	2021, 2022	2
Last updated end of 2026 season

== Match records ==
=== Scores ===
Biggest wins

Rank	Margin	Opponent	Year	Round	Venue
1	95	Essendon	2025	24	Carrara Stadium
2	87	West Coast	2025	1	Perth Stadium
3	86	Hawthorn	2017	3	Carrara Stadium
4	84	Richmond	2025	21	Carrara Stadium
5	83	Greater Western Sydney	2013	23	Carrara Stadium
Last updated round 24, 2025

Biggest losses

Rank	Margin	Opponent	Year	Round	Venue
1	150	Geelong	2011	20	Kardinia Park
2	139	Essendon	2011	6	Docklands Stadium
3	126	West Coast	2012	14	Subiaco Oval
4	120	Geelong	2016	6	Kardinia Park
5	119	Carlton	2011	2	The Gabba
Last updated round 24, 2025

Highest score

Rank	Score	Goals	Behinds	Opponent	Year	Round	Venue
1	164	26	8	Geelong	2024	10	Marrara Oval
2	153	23	15	Essendon	2025	24	Carrara Stadium
3	148	21	22	Greater Western Sydney	2013	5	Manuka Oval
4	146	22	14	Greater Western Sydney	2013	23	Carrara Stadium
5	141	21	15	North Melbourne	2025	5	Barossa Park
Last updated round 24, 2025

Lowest score

Rank	Score	Goals	Behinds	Opponent	Year	Round	Venue
1	20	3	2	Port Adelaide	2017	23	Adelaide Oval
2	26	4	2	Greater Western Sydney	2018	12	Sydney Showground Stadium
3	27	4	3	Carlton	2020	13	Marrara Oval
4	29	4	5	Port Adelaide	2020	1	Carrara Stadium
4	29	3	11	Fremantle	2026	16	Perth Stadium
Last updated round 20, 2026

Biggest comebacks

Rank	Largest deficit	Final score	Opponent	Opponent score	Round	Year	Venue
1	40	15.14.104	Port Adelaide	15.11.101	5	2011	Football Park
1	40	14.10.94	Richmond	13.14.92	17	2022	Carrara Stadium
3	36	12.13.85	Richmond	9.16.70	17	2011	Cazaly's Stadium
4	35	16.16.112	Adelaide	13.9.87	12	2023	Marrara Oval
4	31	9.12.66	North Melbourne	8.3.51	11	2013	Carrara Stadium
Last updated to the end of 2025

Biggest collapses

Rank	Largest lead	Final score	Opponent	Opponent score	Round	Year	Venue
1	43	16.9.105	North Melbourne	17.9.111	11	2026	Docklands Stadium
2	40	13.9.87	Carlton	13.13.91	23	2023	Carrara Stadium
3	39	11.12.78	St Kilda	11.14.80	13	2018	Carrara Stadium
4	37	11.7.73	Western Bulldogs	14.11.95	15	2015	Cazaly's Stadium
5	31	11.10.76	St Kilda	11.14.80	13	2019	Riverway Stadium
Last updated round 20, 2026

=== Streaks ===
Longest winning streaks

Rank	Commenced	Concluded	Matches
1	Round 23, 2024	Round 5, 2025	5
1	Round 5, 2014	Round 10, 2014	5
3	Opening Round, 2026	Round 2, 2026	3
3	Round 9, 2025	Round 11, 2025	3
3	Round 16, 2025	Round 18, 2025	3
3	Round 1, 2016	Round 3, 2016	3
3	Round 2, 2019	Round 4, 2019	3
3	Round 2, 2020	Round 4, 2020	3
Last updated round 22, 2026

Longest losing streaks

Rank	Commenced	Concluded	Matches
1	Round 18, 2011	Round 15, 2012	21
2	Round 5, 2019	Round 2, 2020	19
3	Round 10, 2026	Round 21, 2026	10
3	Round 4, 2016	Round 14, 2016	10
5	Round 20, 2014	Round 4, 2015	8
5	Round 8, 2011	Round 16, 2011	8
Last updated round 22, 2026

=== Attendances ===
Top home attendances

Rank	Round	Opponent	Venue	Crowd
1	Round 3, 2018	Fremantle	Perth Stadium	33,388
2	Round 2, 2011	Carlton	The Gabba	27,914
3	Round 7, 2011	Brisbane	The Gabba	25,501
4	Round 16, 2014	Collingwood	Carrara Stadium	24,032
5	Round 18, 2011	Collingwood	Carrara Stadium	23,302
Last updated round 21, 2025

== Win–loss record ==
Opponent	Played	Won	Lost	Drawn	Win %
Adelaide Crows	22	5	17	0	22.73
Brisbane Lions	32	8	24	0	25.00
Carlton Blues	21	8	13	0	38.10
Collingwood Magpies	17	5	12	0	29.41
Essendon Bombers	19	7	11	1	39.47
Fremantle Dockers	18	6	12	0	33.33
Geelong Cats	19	5	14	0	26.32
GWS Giants	23	7	16	0	30.43
Hawthorn Hawks	21	7	14	0	33.33
Melbourne Demons	22	5	17	0	22.73
North Melbourne Kangaroos	23	12	11	0	52.17
Port Adelaide Power	18	3	15	0	16.67
Richmond Tigers	18	10	8	0	55.55
St Kilda Saints	22	8	14	0	36.36
Sydney Swans	19	5	14	0	26.32
West Coast Eagles	20	8	11	1	42.50
Western Bulldogs	19	5	14	0	26.32
Total	353	114	237	2	32.58
Last updated: End of 2026 Season
