= Leah Kaslar =

Australian rules footballer (born 1985)

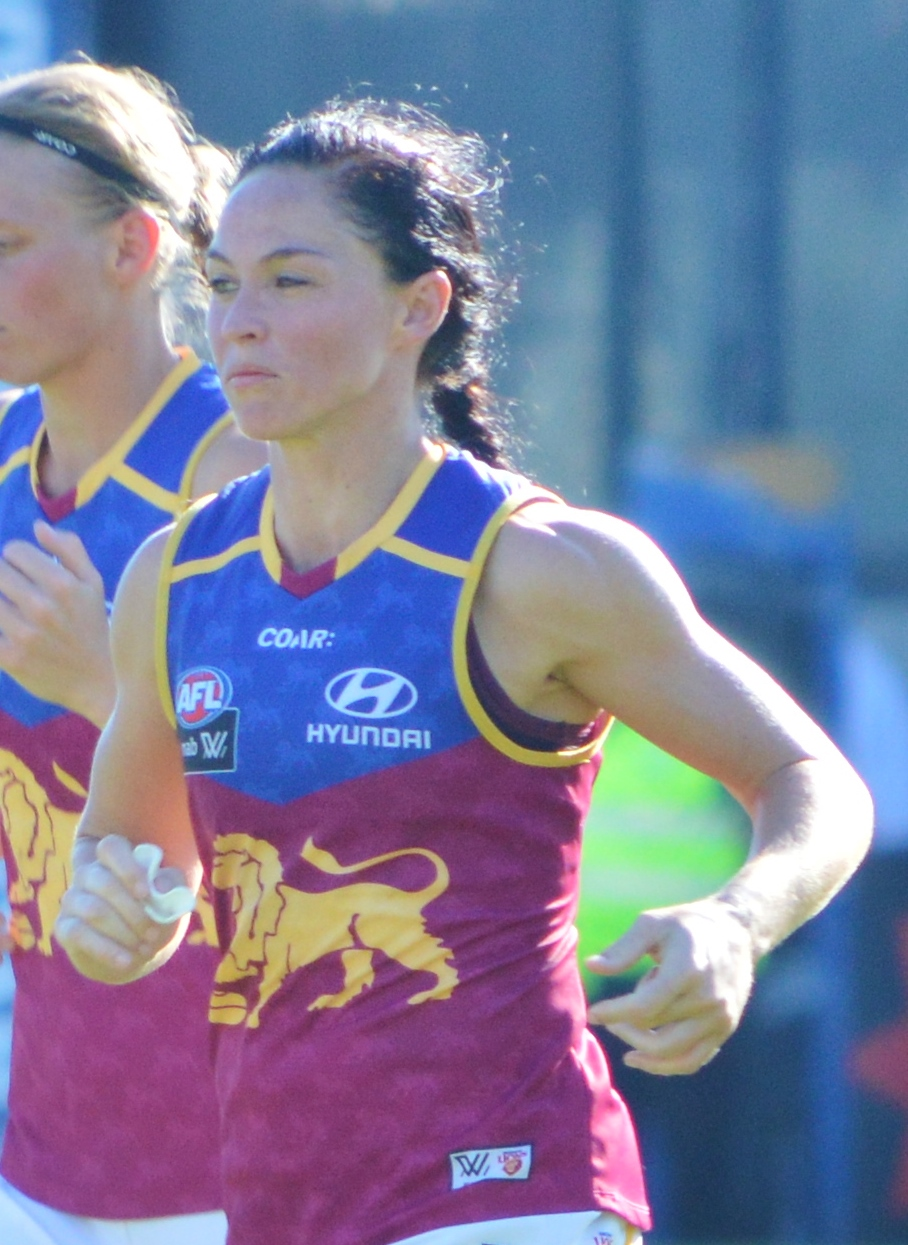
- Kaslar playing for Brisbane in March 2017

Personal information
- Full name: Leah Kaslar
- Nickname: Xena Princess Warrior
- Born: 11 September 1985 (age 41); Caringbah, New South Wales
- Original team: Coolangatta Tweed Heads (QWAFL)
- Draft: No. 31, 2016 AFL Women's draft
- Debut: Round 1, 2017, Brisbane vs. Melbourne, at Casey Fields
- Height: 171 cm (5 ft 7 in)
- Position: Full back/ruck

Playing career^{1}
Years	Club	Games (Goals)
2017–2019	Brisbane	21 (0)
2020–2021	Gold Coast	15 (3)
Total		36 (3)

Representative team honours
Years	Team	Games (Goals)
2017	The Allies	1 (0)
- ^{1} Playing statistics correct to the end of the 2021 season.

Career highlights
- AFL Women's: Gold Coast co-captain (2020); Gold Coast leading goalkicker (2021); Brisbane Lions captain (2019); QWAFL: 2016 QWAFL League Best & Fairest

Leah Kaslar (born 11 September 1985) is a former Australian rules footballer who played for Brisbane and Gold Coast in the AFL Women's (AFLW), captaining both teams.

== Early life ==
Kaslar was born in 1985 in Caringbah, New South Wales and moved with her family to Cairns, Queensland before her first birthday. She first played football as a teenager in Cairns and moved to the Gold Coast shortly after her 21st birthday where she began playing football for Coolangatta Tweed Heads in the QAFLW. She was equal winner of the Queensland Women's AFL (QWAFL) best and fairest in 2016.

== AFLW career ==
=== Brisbane ===
Kaslar was recruited by Brisbane with the number 31 pick in the 2016 AFL Women's draft. She was announced as one of the Brisbane Lions' "values leaders" to assist captain Emma Zielke alongside Emily Bates, Sabrina Frederick-Traub and Sam Virgo in January 2017. She made her debut in the Lions' inaugural game against Melbourne at Casey Fields on 5 February 2017. At the end of the season, she was listed in the 2017 40-player All-Australian squad.

Brisbane signed Kaslar for the 2018 season during the trade period in May 2017. Brisbane signed Kaslar for the 2019 season prior to the 2018 AFL Women's draft. On 12 December 2018, she was elected 2019 team captain by her teammates.

=== Gold Coast ===
Following the 2019 season, Kaslar joined Gold Coast. She was appointed co-captain in January 2020. In June 2021, Gold Coast announced they were not offering Kaslar a contract for 2022 season 6.

== Statistics ==
Legend
G	Goals	K	Kicks	D	Disposals	T	Tackles
B	Behinds	H	Handballs	M	Marks

Season	Team	No.	Games	Totals							Averages (per game)							Votes
Season	Team	No.	Games	G	B	K	H	D	M	T	G	B	K	H	D	M	T	Votes
2017	Brisbane	11	8	0	0	28	29	57	7	18	0.0	0.0	3.5	3.6	7.1	0.9	2.3	0
2018	Brisbane	11	8	0	0	22	38	60	6	28	0.0	0.0	2.8	4.8	7.5	0.8	3.5	0
2019	Brisbane	11	5	0	0	16	12	28	4	12	0.0	0.0	3.2	2.4	5.6	0.8	2.4	0
2020	Gold Coast	11	7	0	3	29	35	64	11	22	0.0	0.4	4.1	5.0	9.1	1.6	3.1	0
2021	Gold Coast	11	8	3	1	25	19	44	8	16	0.4	0.1	3.1	2.4	5.5	1.0	2.0	0
Career			36	3	4	120	133	253	36	96	0.1	0.1	3.3	3.7	7.0	1.0	2.7	0
