= Kalinda Howarth =

Australian rules footballer

Personal information
- Full name: Kalinda Jacky Howarth
- Nickname: Kindy
- Born: 2 August 1999 (age 27); Gold Coast, Queensland
- Original team: Coolangatta Tweed (QAFLW)
- Draft: No. 31, 2017 AFL Women's draft
- Debut: Round 1, 2020, Gold Coast vs. Greater Western Sydney, at Blacktown International Sportspark
- Height: 169 cm (5 ft 7 in)
- Position: Forward

Club information
- Current club: Collingwood
- Number: 35

Playing career^{1}
Years	Club	Games (Goals)
2018	Brisbane	0 (0)
2020–2023	Gold Coast	35 (20)
2024–	Collingwood	17 (9)
Total		52 (29)
- ^{1} Playing statistics correct to the end of round 11, 2026.

Career highlights
- AFL Women's All-Australian team: 2020; 2× Gold Coast leading goalkicker: 2020, 2021; AFL Women's Rising Star nominee: 2020

Kalinda Jacky Howarth (born 2 August 1999) is an Australian rules footballer with the Collingwood Football Club in the AFL Women's (AFLW). She was previously listed at the Brisbane Lions in 2018 and played for the Gold Coast Suns from 2020 to 2023. Howarth is a dual Gold Coast leading goalkicker and was named in the 2020 AFL Women's All-Australian team.

== Early life ==
Howarth was born on the Gold Coast into a family of Indigenous Australian (Yuin) descent and attended Helensvale State High School throughout her upbringing. She grew up a passionate rugby league supporter and played touch rugby, soccer and basketball throughout her childhood. At the age of 12, her brother convinced her to try Australian rules football with the Southport Sharks. She later switched clubs to play for Labrador and eventually Coolangatta Tweed in the top level Queensland competition in the lead up to her draft year. At the age of 17, Howarth kicked the premiership-winning goal for Coolangatta Tweed in the 2016 QAFLW grand final. Howarth signed with the Gold Coast Suns Academy. She was also named on the half forward line in the 2017 Under 18 All-Australian team following her strong performance at the national championships.

Howarth named Lance Franklin as her football idol growing up and wears the number 23 guernsey in recognition of her desire to play like him.

== AFL Women's career ==
=== Brisbane and return to QAFLW (2018–2019) ===
Howarth was selected by Brisbane with the 31st pick in the 2017 AFL Women's draft but was delisted a year later without making her AFLW debut. She then joined Bond University and impressed with 31 goals in 15 games to win the QAFLW leading goal kicker award for 2019 and finish in second place in the league best and fairest voting. Her performance led to draft pre-selection by Gold Coast, her hometown club, to be a part of its inaugural AFLW list.

=== Gold Coast (2020–2023) ===
She made her AFL Women's debut against Greater Western Sydney in round 1 of the 2020 AFL Women's season. In the inaugural women's QClash between intrastate rivals Gold Coast and Brisbane, Howarth kicked three of the Suns' four goals against her former side and drew comparisons to Geelong forward Steve Johnson following her performance. She was also named the AFLW's Round 3 AFL Women's Rising Star nominee for her efforts. Three weeks later, Howarth kicked a career-high four goals and was voted best on ground in her team's 25-point win over West Coast, which ultimately secured a place in the finals for the Suns. She was named in the 2020 AFLW All-Australian team for her season performance.

=== Collingwood (2024–present) ===
During the trade period ahead of the 2024 season, Howarth was traded to Collingwood as part of a three-club deal also involving Brisbane, with Collingwood parting with a third-round pick and a fourth-round pick of that year's draft as part of the trade.

== Statistics ==
Updated to the end of the 2025 season.

Legend
G	Goals	K	Kicks	D	Disposals	T	Tackles
B	Behinds	H	Handballs	M	Marks

Season	Team	No.	Games	Totals							Averages (per game)							Votes
Season	Team	No.	Games	G	B	K	H	D	M	T	G	B	K	H	D	M	T	Votes
2018	Brisbane	19	0	—	—	—	—	—	—	—	—	—	—	—	—	—	—	—
2020	Gold Coast	23	7	9	2	54	17	71	10	16	1.3	0.3	7.7	2.4	10.1	1.4	2.3	4
2021	Gold Coast	23	9	3	3	82	23	105	23	10	0.3	0.3	9.1	2.6	11.7	2.6	1.1	3
2022 (S6)	Gold Coast	23	9	2	3	74	23	97	25	17	0.2	0.3	8.2	2.6	10.8	2.8	1.9	0
2022 (S7)	Gold Coast	23	9	6	7	79	21	100	23	18	0.7	0.8	8.8	2.3	11.1	2.6	2.0	5
2023	Gold Coast	23	1	0	0	10	5	15	5	1	0.0	0.0	10.0	5.0	15.0	5.0	1.0	0
2024	Collingwood	35	0	—	—	—	—	—	—	—	—	—	—	—	—	—	—	—
2025	Collingwood	35	11	7	11	75	41	116	30	15	0.6	1.0	6.8	3.7	10.5	2.7	1.4	0
Career			46	27	26	374	130	504	116	77	0.6	0.6	8.1	2.8	11.0	2.5	1.7	12

== Honours and achievements ==
- AFL Women's All-Australian team: 2020
- 2× Gold Coast leading goalkicker: 2020, 2021
- AFL Women's Rising Star nominee: 2020
- AFL Women's 22under22 team: 2020
