= Hannah Dunn =

Australian rules footballer

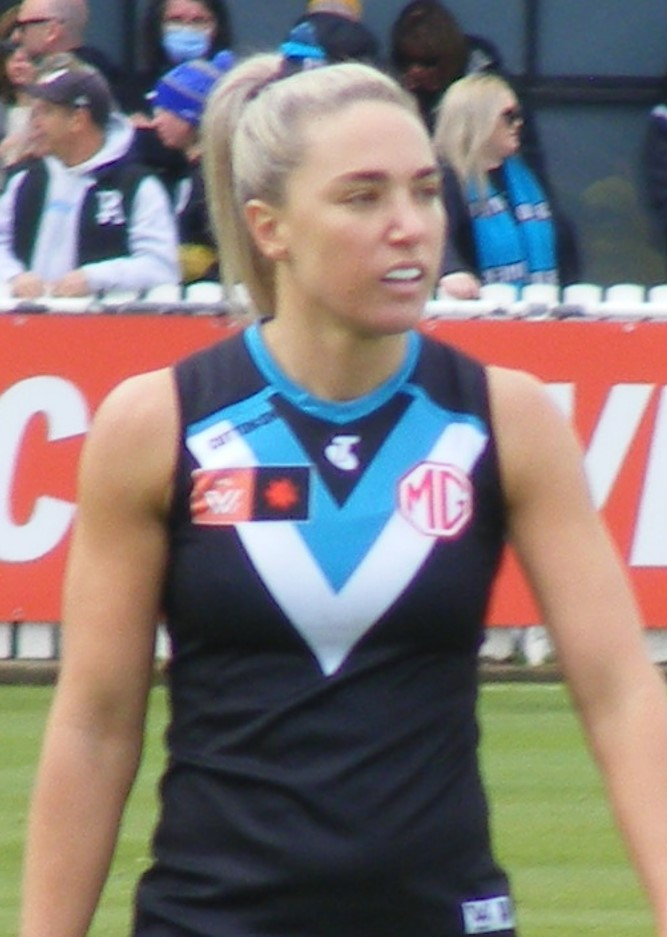

Personal information
- Born: 19 August 1991 (age 35)
- Original team: Queanbeyan (AFL Canberra)
- Debut: Round 1, 2017, Greater Western Sydney vs. Adelaide, at Thebarton Oval
- Height: 168 cm (5 ft 6 in)

Club information
- Current club: Port Adelaide
- Number: 24

Playing career^{1}
Years	Club	Games (Goals)
2017	Greater Western Sydney	1 (0)
2020–2022 (S6)	Gold Coast	24 (0)
2022 (S7)–	Port Adelaide	20 (0)
Total		45 (0)
- ^{1} Playing statistics correct to the end of the 2023 season.

Career highlights
- Gold Coast captain: 2021–2022 (S6) (co-captain 2021); inaugural Port Adelaide player

Hannah Dunn (born 19 August 1991) is a former Australian rules footballer who played for Port Adelaide in the AFL Women's competition.

== Early life ==
Dunn was raised in Canberra and attended Daramalan College throughout her upbringing. She began playing football in 2010 for the Queanbeyan Tigerettes in the AFL Canberra competition and became the first female player to reach 100 appearances for the club.

== AFLW career ==
Despite missing out on selection in the 2016 AFL Women's draft, Dunn trained with Greater Western Sydney as a back-up player in 2016 preseason period. She made her debut in the thirty-six point loss to Adelaide at Thebarton Oval in the opening round of the 2017 season. It was her only match for the Giants and she was delisted at the end of the 2017 season. Dunn was drafted to the Gold Coast Suns with pick 22 in the 2019 AFL Women's draft and played six AFLW matches for the club in 2020. She was named co-captain of the club in January 2021, and sole captain the following season. On 26 May 2022, Dunn announced her signing with the new AFLW expansion team Port Adelaide.
