= Tara Bohanna =

Australian rules footballer

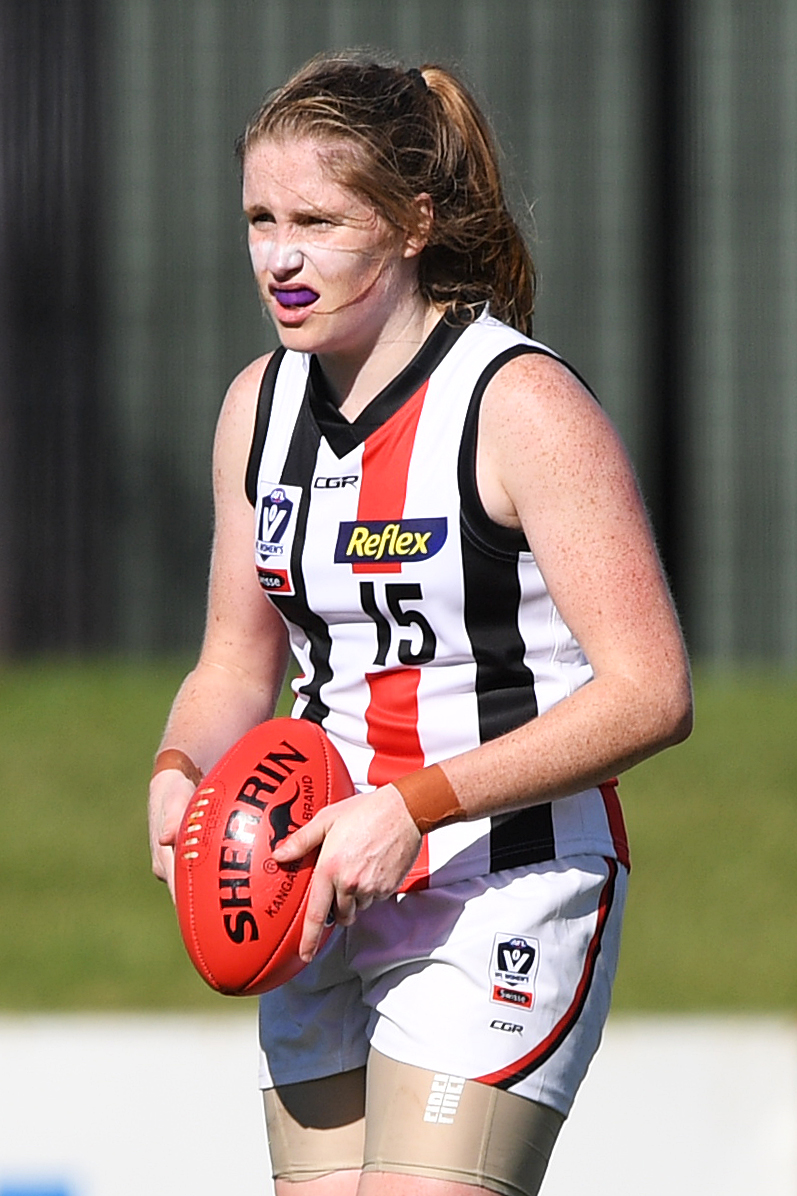
- Bohanna playing for the Southern Saints in 2019

Personal information
- Born: 2 March 1995 (age 31); Australia
- Original team: Southern Saints (VFLW)
- Debut: Round 1, 2022 (S6), Gold Coast vs. Greater Western Sydney, at Great Barrier Reef Arena
- Height: 178 cm (5 ft 10 in)
- Position: Forward

Club information
- Current club: Carlton

Playing career^{1}
Years	Club	Games (Goals)
2022 (S6)–2024	Gold Coast	31 (36)
2025–	Carlton	0 (0)
- ^{1} Playing statistics correct to the end of the 2024 season.

Career highlights
- Gold Coast captain: 2022 (S7)-2024; 3× Gold Coast leading goalkicker: 2022 (S6), 2022 (S7), 2024

Tara Bohanna (born 3 March 1995) is an Australian rules footballer playing for Carlton in the AFL Women's (AFLW). She previously played for Gold Coast, and was appointed their captain in August 2022.

== Career ==
Bohanna debuted for the Suns in round 1 of 2022 season 6, having been signed as a replacement player by the club during the 2021 off-season. She played for the Southern Saints in the VFL Women's (VFLW) competition in 2019 and 2021, and took out the club's best and fairest award in the latter season. She was also the league's third-highest goalkicker in 2021 and averaged over 16 disposals and four marks a game. Following her signing by the Suns, she established herself quickly as a goal-kicking forward and was the club's highest scoring goal-kicker for 2022 season 6, kicking 13 goals in 10 games.
