= Jamie Stanton =

Australian rules footballer

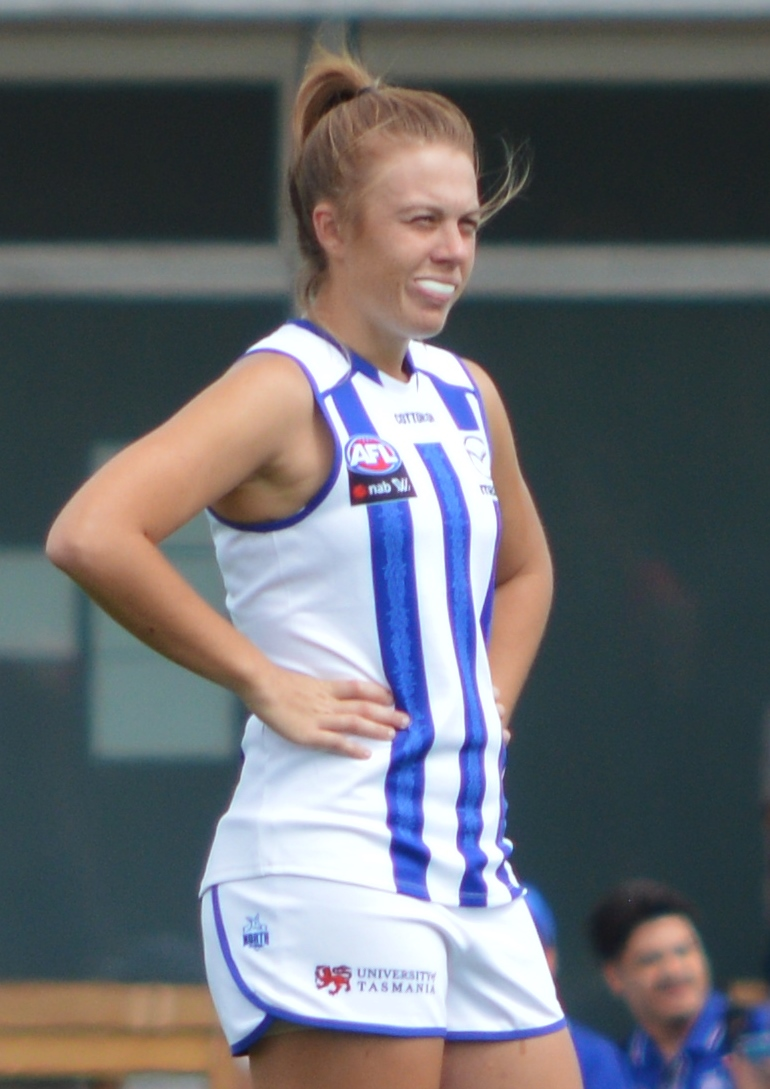
- Stanton during a pre-season practice match for North Melbourne in 2019

Personal information
- Full name: Jamie Stanton
- Born: 7 November 1995 (age 30)
- Original team: Coolangatta Tweed Heads (QWAFL)
- Draft: No. 127, 2016 national draft
- Debut: Round 1, 2017, Brisbane vs. Melbourne, at Casey Fields
- Height: 166 cm (5 ft 5 in)
- Position: Midfielder / forward

Club information
- Current club: Gold Coast
- Number: 17

Playing career^{1}
Years	Club	Games (Goals)
2017–2018	Brisbane	16 (0)
2019	North Melbourne	7 (0)
2020–	Gold Coast	46 (28)
Total		69 (28)
- ^{1} Playing statistics correct to the end of the 2024 season.

Career highlights
- Gold Coast Club Champion: 2020; 2× Gold Coast leading goalkicker: 2021, 2023

Jamie Stanton (born 7 November 1995) is an Australian rules footballer playing for the Gold Coast Suns in the AFL Women's (AFLW). She previously played for the Brisbane Lions from 2017 to 2018 and the North Melbourne Football Club in 2019. Stanton was the inaugural Gold Coast Club Champion in 2020 and is a dual Gold Coast leading goalkicker.

== Early life ==
Stanton grew up on the Gold Coast where she attended St Andrews Lutheran College and excelled in soccer, earning selection for the junior Matildas as a teenager. After graduating from high school, she accepted a four-year soccer scholarship at Lindsey Wilson College in Kentucky but lost her passion for the sport and returned to Queensland after one year in the United States. Stanton played Australian rules football for the first time at the age of 19 when she was invited to play for Coolangatta Tweed Heads in the Queensland Women's Australian Football League (QWAFL).

== AFL Women's career ==
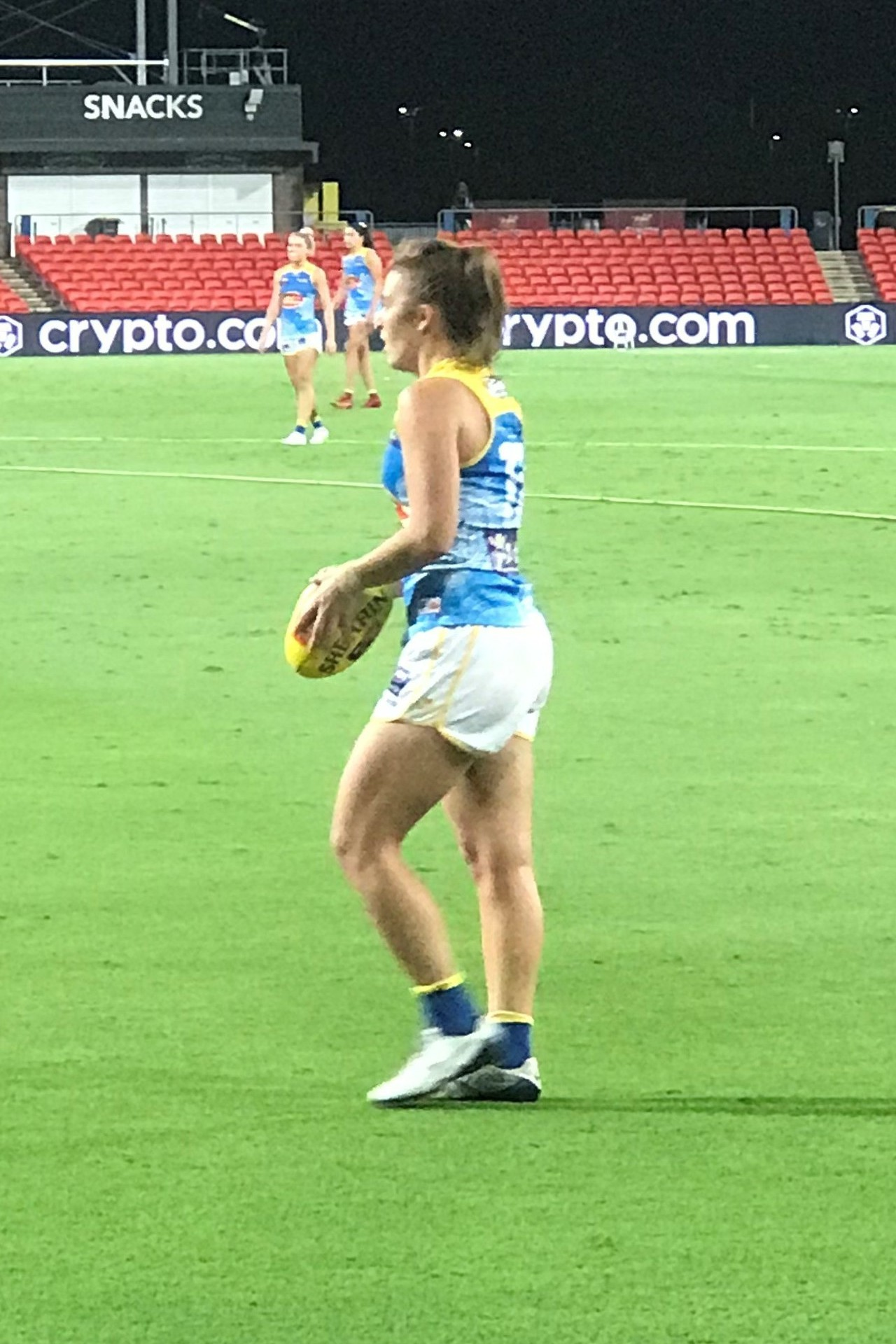
Stanton playing for Gold Coast in 2022

Stanton was recruited by Brisbane with the 127th selection in the 2016 AFL Women's draft. She made her debut in the Lions' inaugural game against Melbourne at Casey Fields on 5 February 2017. Brisbane signed Stanton for the 2018 season during the trade period in May 2017.

In May 2018, Stanton joined expansion team North Melbourne for the 2019 AFL Women's season.

In April 2019, Stanton left North Melbourne to return to Queensland and join new expansion team Gold Coast for the 2020 AFL Women's season. She made her Gold Coast debut in the club's inaugural game against Greater Western Sydney at Blacktown ISP Oval, and was named among Gold Coast's best players. Stanton was best afield in Gold Coast's inaugural win against Richmond at Metricon Stadium the following week, playing a tagging role on Richmond captain Katie Brennan despite a shoulder injury during the game, and was selected in womens.afl's Team of the Week for that round. Finishing the season as one of fourteen players to have played the most AFL Women's matches to that point with 30, she went on to be selected in the initial 40-woman squad for the 2020 AFL Women's All-Australian team and was the inaugural Gold Coast Club Champion.

In 2022 (S6), Stanton was Gold Coast's best player in its losses to Greater Western Sydney in round 1, St Kilda in round 8 and Fremantle in round 10, and was among Gold Coast's best players in every other game for the season.

In 2024, Stanton kicked a goal after the final siren to draw the match for Gold Coast against Greater Western Sydney in week 3.

== Statistics ==
Updated to the end of the 2024 season.

Legend
G	Goals	K	Kicks	D	Disposals	T	Tackles
B	Behinds	H	Handballs	M	Marks

Season	Team	No.	Games	Totals							Averages (per game)							Votes
Season	Team	No.	Games	G	B	K	H	D	M	T	G	B	K	H	D	M	T	Votes
2017	Brisbane	17	8	0	0	60	14	74	15	23	0.0	0.0	7.5	1.8	9.3	1.9	2.9	0
2018	Brisbane	17	8	0	1	96	37	133	21	25	0.0	0.1	12.0	4.6	16.6	2.6	3.1	0
2019	North Melbourne	17	7	0	1	80	40	120	35	29	0.0	0.1	11.4	5.7	16.1	5.0	4.1	3
2020	Gold Coast	17	7	2	3	89	31	120	20	26	0.3	0.4	12.7	4.4	17.1	2.9	3.7	2
2021	Gold Coast	17	6	3	5	55	20	75	12	24	0.5	0.8	9.2	3.3	12.5	2.0	4.0	1
2022 (S6)	Gold Coast	17	10	2	5	108	31	139	15	56	0.2	0.5	10.8	3.1	13.9	1.5	5.6	3
2022 (S7)	Gold Coast	17	2	1	1	4	1	5	0	4	0.5	0.5	2.0	0.5	2.5	0.0	2.0	0
2023	Gold Coast	17	11	16	4	52	14	66	17	29	1.5	0.4	4.7	1.3	6.0	1.5	2.6	3
2024	Gold Coast	17	10	4	7	53	12	65	19	18	0.4	0.7	5.3	1.2	6.5	1.9	1.8	0
Career			69	28	27	597	200	797	154	233	0.4	0.4	8.7	2.9	11.6	2.2	3.4	12

== Honours and achievements ==
Team

- AFL Women's minor premiership (Brisbane): 2017

Individual

- Gold Coast Club Champion: 2020
- 2× Gold Coast leading goalkicker: 2021, 2023
