= Sam Virgo =

Australian rules footballer

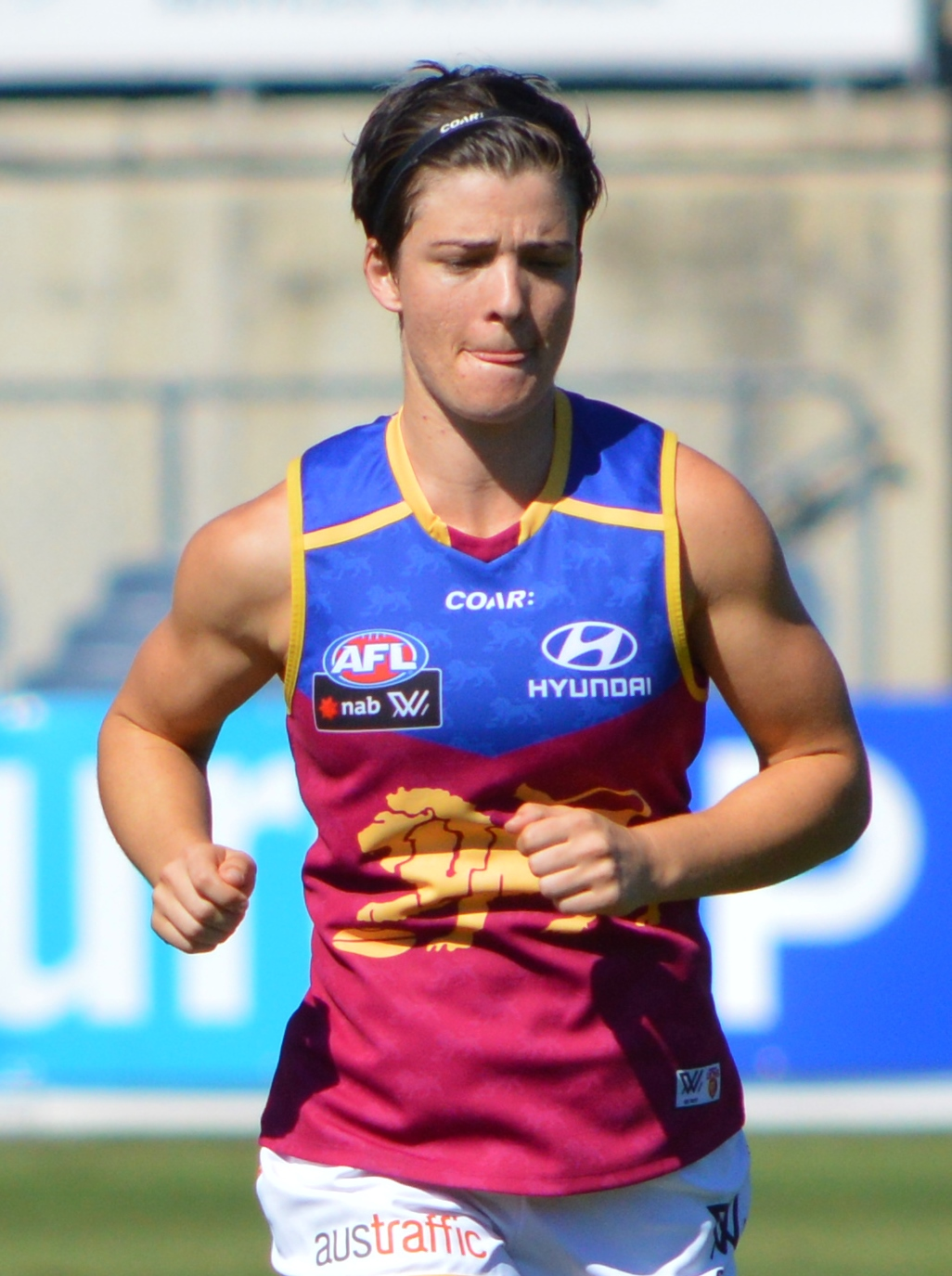
- Virgo playing for Brisbane in March 2017

Personal information
- Full name: Samantha Virgo
- Born: 20 February 1987 (age 39); Blackwood, South Australia
- Original team: Yeronga South Brisbane (QWAFL)
- Draft: No. 66, 2016 AFL Women's draft
- Debut: Round 1, 2017, Brisbane vs. Melbourne, at Casey Fields
- Height: 166 cm (5 ft 5 in)
- Position: Half-back flank

Playing career^{1}
Years	Club	Games (Goals)
2017–2019	Brisbane	15 (0)
2020–2021	Gold Coast	14 (3)
Total		29 (3)
- ^{1} Playing statistics correct to the end of the 2021 season.

Career highlights
- AFLW: Gold Coast co-captain (2020–21); AFLW All Australian team (2017); Gold Coast leading goalkicker (2021); QWAFL: 2016 QWAFL League Best & Fairest

Samantha Virgo (born 20 February 1987) is a former Australian rules footballer who played for Brisbane and Gold Coast in the AFL Women's. She was selected in the All-Australian team in 2017, and co-captained Gold Coast from 2020 to 2021.

== Early life ==
Virgo was born in 1987 in Blackwood, South Australia in the Adelaide Hills. Virgo grew up an avid football fan and played Australian rules at school, though was not aware of any structured club competition for girls in her area.

Virgo relocated to Queensland in 2014 at the age of 25, and played their first game of football was played at senior level for Griffith-Moorooka shortly after. Virgo went on to win the club best and fairest in 2015 and after transferring to Yeronga South Brisbane was equal winner of the Queensland Women's AFL (QWAFL) best and fairest in 2016.

== AFLW career ==
=== Brisbane ===
Virgo was recruited by Brisbane with the number 66 pick in the 2016 AFL Women's draft. She was announced as one of the Brisbane Lions' "values leaders" to assist captain Emma Zielke alongside Emily Bates, Sabrina Frederick-Traub and Leah Kaslar in January 2017. She made her debut in the Lions' inaugural game against Melbourne at Casey Fields on 5 February 2017. She was nominated by her teammates for the 2017 AFLW Players' most valuable player award, and was also listed in the 2017 All-Australian team.

Brisbane signed Virgo for the 2018 season during the trade period in May 2017. She missed that season through injury, and instead acted as team manager for the Lions. She returned to playing for the 2019 season as one of three vice-captains under Kaslar.

=== Gold Coast ===
Following the 2019 season, Virgo joined Gold Coast. She was appointed co-captain in January 2020. Virgo retired at the end of the 2021 season.

== Statistics ==
Legend
G	Goals	K	Kicks	D	Disposals	T	Tackles
B	Behinds	H	Handballs	M	Marks

Season	Team	No.	Games	Totals							Averages (per game)							Votes
Season	Team	No.	Games	G	B	K	H	D	M	T	G	B	K	H	D	M	T	Votes
2017	Brisbane	5	8	0	0	52	26	78	14	23	0.0	0.0	6.5	3.3	9.8	1.8	2.9	0
2018	Brisbane	5	0	—	—	—	—	—	—	—	—	—	—	—	—	—	—	0
2019	Brisbane	5	7	0	0	39	23	62	13	15	0.0	0.0	5.6	3.3	8.9	1.9	2.1	0
2020	Gold Coast	22	7	0	0	42	14	56	9	8	0.0	0.0	6.0	2.0	8.0	1.3	1.1	0
2021	Gold Coast	22	7	3	1	41	16	57	24	9	0.4	0.1	5.9	2.3	8.1	3.4	1.3	0
Career			29	3	1	174	79	253	60	55	0.1	0.0	6.0	2.7	8.7	2.1	1.9	0
