= List of Gold Coast Suns leading goalkickers =

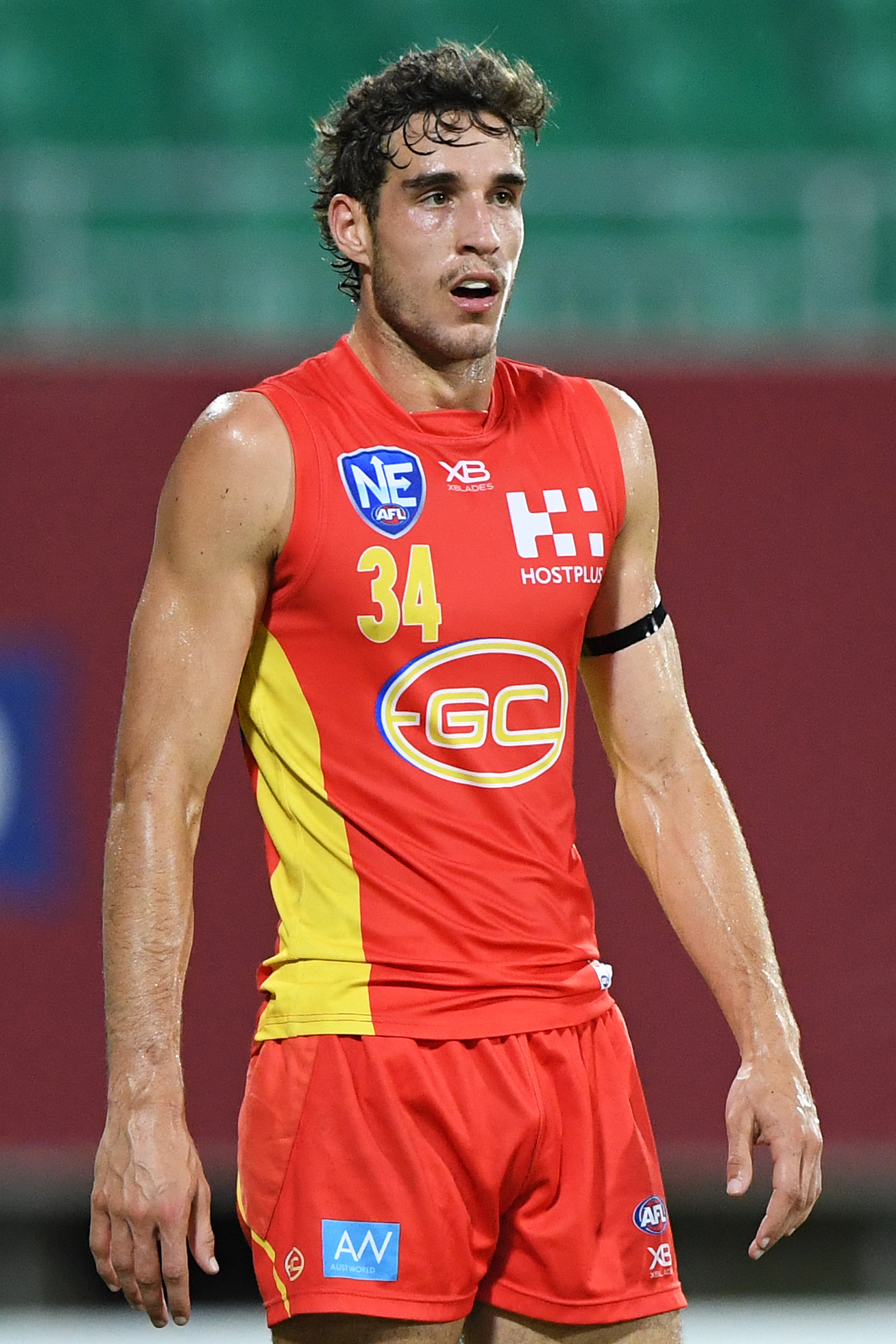
Ben King won the award in just his second season, and has since taken the record for most leading goalkicker awards.

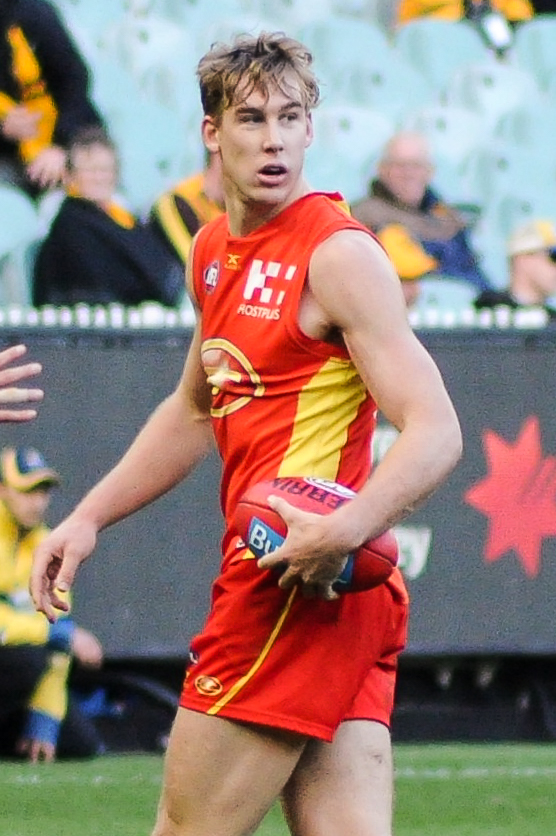
Tom Lynch was Gold Coast's leading goalkicker on four occasions.

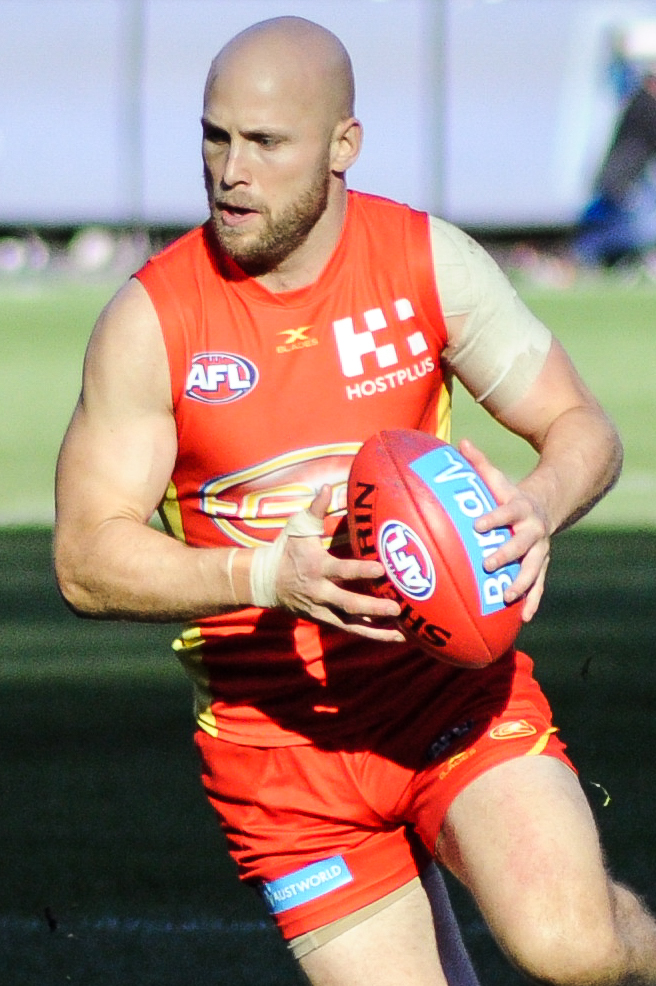
Gary Ablett Jr. led the goalkicking twice, including in a Brownlow Medal–winning 2013.

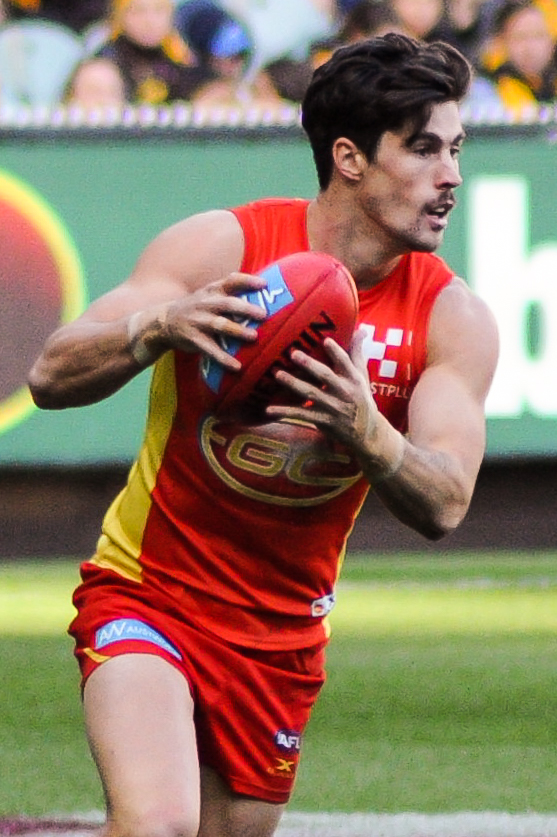
Alex Sexton is one of four players to lead the goalkicking on two occasions.

The following is a list of Gold Coast Suns leading goalkickers in each of their seasons in the Australian Football League (AFL) and AFL Women's (AFLW). Ben King holds the record for most goals kicked in a season for Gold Coast (71) and overtook Tom Lynch for the record of most occasions as the club's leading goalkicker and most career goals for the club in the 2025 AFL season. So far, no Gold Coast player has won the Coleman Medal.

== AFL leading goalkickers ==
| ^ | Denotes current player |

| Season | Player(s) | Goals |
|---|---|---|
| 2011 | Danny Stanley | 20 |
| 2012 | Gary Ablett Jr. | 26 |
| 2013 | Gary Ablett Jr. (2) | 28 |
| 2014 | Tom Lynch | 46 |
| 2015 | Tom Lynch (2) | 43 |
| 2016 | Tom Lynch (3) | 66 |
| 2017 | Tom Lynch (4) | 44 |
| 2018 | Alex Sexton | 28 |
| 2019 | Alex Sexton (2) | 39 |
| 2020 | Ben King | 25 |
| 2021 | Ben King (2) | 47 |
| 2022 | Mabior Chol | 44 |
| 2023 | Ben King (3) | 40 |
| 2024 | Ben King (4) | 55 |
| 2025 | Ben King (5) | 71 |
| 2026 | Ben King (6) | 60 |

=== Multiple winners ===
| Player | Wins | Seasons |
|---|---|---|
| Ben King | 6 | 2020, 2021, 2023, 2024, 2025, 2026 |
| Tom Lynch | 4 | 2014, 2015, 2016, 2017 |
| Gary Ablett Jr. | 2 | 2012, 2013 |
| Alex Sexton | 2 | 2018, 2019 |

=== Leading career goalkickers ===
Updated to end of 2026 season.

| Player | Goals | Average |
|---|---|---|
| Ben King | 315 | 2.20 |
| Tom Lynch | 254 | 1.94 |
| Alex Sexton | 164 | 0.88 |
| Ben Ainsworth | 137 | 0.87 |
| Gary Ablett Jr. | 124 | 1.13 |
| Brandon Matera | 124 | 1.23 |
| Sam Day | 117 | 0.75 |
| David Swallow | 111 | 0.45 |

=== Most goals in a game ===
Updated to end of 2026 season.

| Goals | Player | Opponent | Round | Year | Venue |
|---|---|---|---|---|---|
| 8.1 | Tom Lynch | Carlton | 2 | 2018 | Docklands |
| 7.2 | Charlie Dixon | North Melbourne | 14 | 2015 | Carrara |
| 7.1 | Ben King | Essendon | 24 | 2025 | Carrara |
| 7.0 | Tom Lynch | Carlton | 4 | 2017 | Docklands |
| 7.0 | Ben King | Richmond | 2 | 2026 | MCG |
| 6.3 | Harley Bennell | Geelong | 14 | 2014 | Carrara |
| 6.2 | Charlie Dixon | Greater Western Sydney | 5 | 2013 | Manuka Oval |
| 6.2 | Charlie Dixon | Brisbane Lions | 5 | 2015 | Carrara |
| 6.2 | Alex Sexton | North Melbourne | 23 | 2022 | Docklands |
| 6.2 | Ben King | West Coast | 1 | 2025 | Perth |
| 6.0 | Brandon Matera | Hawthorn | 3 | 2017 | Carrara |
| 6.0 | Ben King | Carlton | 22 | 2025 | Docklands |

== AFL Women's ==
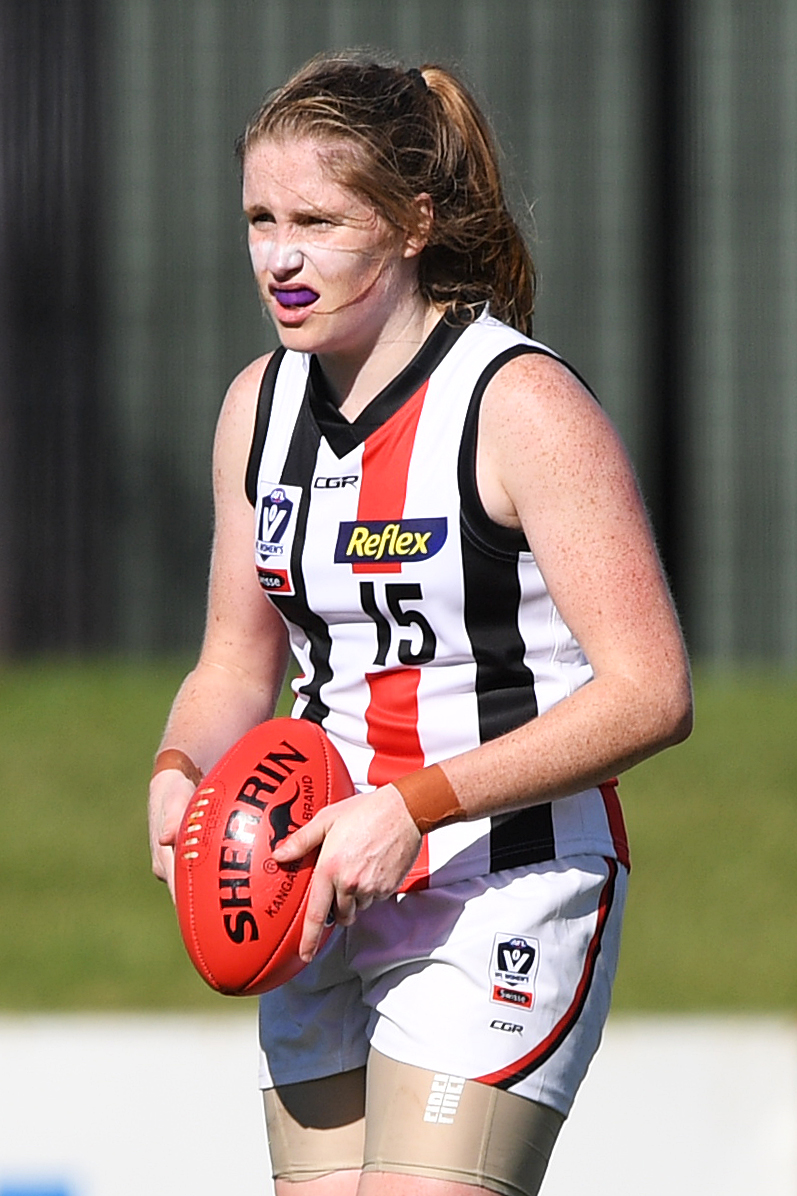
Tara Bohanna has led the Suns' goalkicking in the AFLW three times, more than any other player.

| ^ | Denotes current player |

| Season | Player(s) | Goals |
|---|---|---|
| 2020 | Kalinda Howarth | 9 |
| 2021 | Kalinda Howarth (2) | 3 |
| 2021 | Leah Kaslar | 3 |
| 2021 | Maddison Levi | 3 |
| 2021 | Sarah Perkins | 3 |
| 2021 | Jamie Stanton | 3 |
| 2021 | Sam Virgo | 3 |
| 2022 (S6) | Tara Bohanna | 13 |
| 2022 (S7) | Tara Bohanna (2) | 8 |
| 2022 (S7) | Courtney Jones | 8 |
| 2023 | Jamie Stanton (2) | 16 |
| 2024 | Tara Bohanna (3) | 9 |
| 2025 | Havana Harris^ | 11 |
| 2026 | Havana Harris^ | 31 |

=== Multiple winners ===
| Player | Wins | Seasons |
|---|---|---|
| Tara Bohanna | 3 | 2022 (S6), 2022 (S7), 2024 |
| Kalinda Howarth | 2 | 2020, 2021 |
| Jamie Stanton | 2 | 2021, 2023 |
| Havana Harris^ | 2 | 2025, 2026 |

== See also ==
- VFL/AFL goalkicking records
- Gold Coast Suns Football Club Honour Roll
