= List of Gold Coast Suns captains =

The following is a list of players who have captained the Gold Coast Suns in the Australian Football League (AFL) and the AFL Women's (AFLW).

In June 2025, Lucy Single became the club's first captain to have graduated from the Academy program.

== AFL ==
List of AFL captains, with tenure, names, and reference shown
Years	Captain(s)	Ref.
2011–2016	Gary Ablett Jr.	
2017–2018 (Note: Co-captains)	Tom Lynch	
2017–2018	Steven May	
2019–2021 (Note: Co-captains)	David Swallow	
2019–2021	Jarrod Witts	
2022–2024 (Note: Co-captains)	Jarrod Witts	
2022–2024	Touk Miller	
2025–	Noah Anderson	

== AFL Women's ==
List of AFLW captains, with tenure, names, and reference shown
Years	Captain(s)	Ref.
2020 (Note: Co-captains)	Leah Kaslar	
2020	Sam Virgo	
2021 (Note: Co-captains)	Hannah Dunn	
2021	Sam Virgo	
2022 (S6)	Hannah Dunn	
2022 (S7)–2024	Tara Bohanna	
2025 (Note: Co-captains)	Niamh McLaughlin	
2025	Lucy Single	
