= Tom Lynch (Australian footballer, born 1992) =

Australian rules footballer

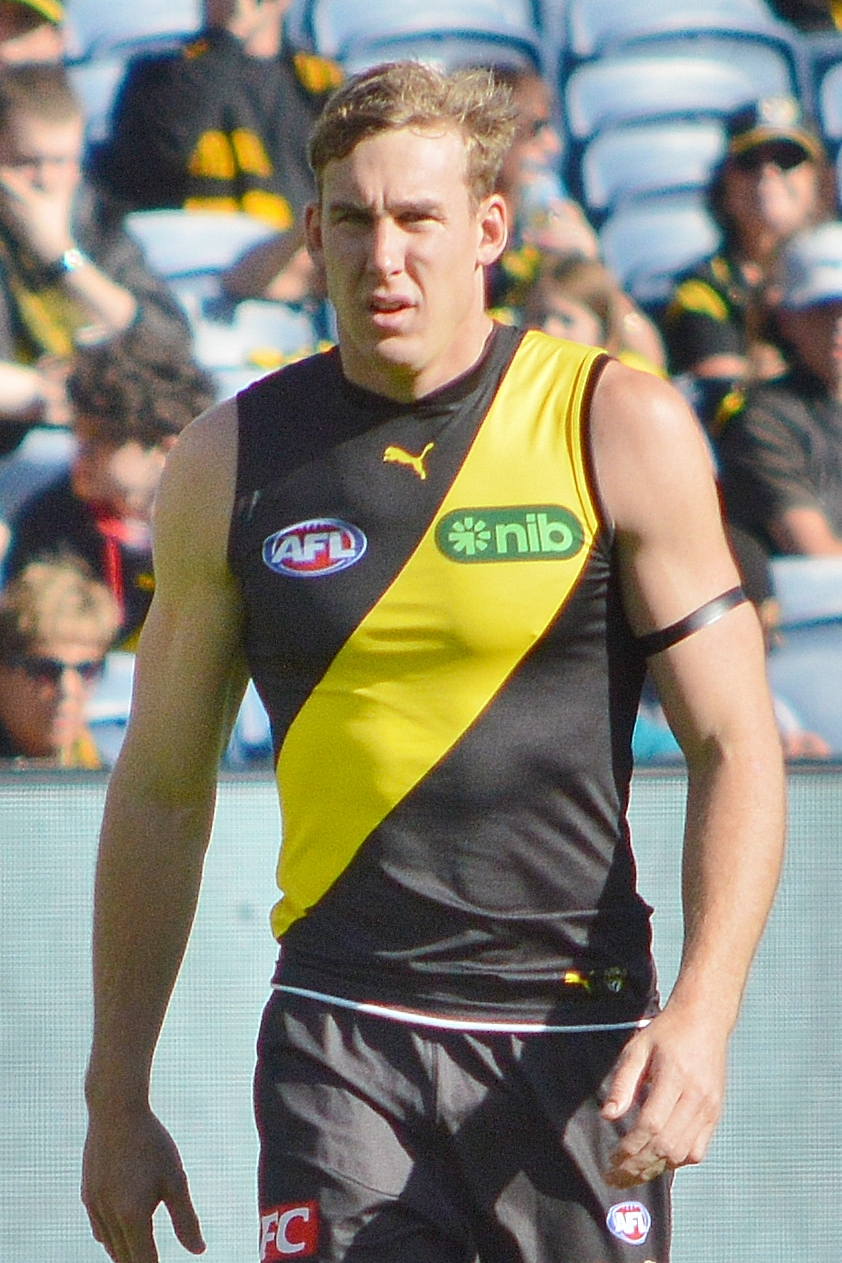
- Lynch with Richmond in April 2025

Personal information
- Full name: Thomas J. Lynch
- Nickname: Pencil
- Born: 31 October 1992 (age 34)
- Original team: Dandenong Stingrays (TAC Cup)
- Draft: No. 11, 2010 AFL National draft: Gold Coast
- Height: 199 cm (6 ft 6 in)
- Weight: 100 kg (220 lb)
- Position: Key forward

Club information
- Current club: Richmond
- Number: 19

Playing career^{1}
Years	Club	Games (Goals)
2011–2018	Gold Coast	131 (254)
2019–	Richmond	120 (254)
Total		251 (508)

Representative team honours^{2}
Years	Team	Games (Goals)
2020	Victoria	1 (1)
- ^{1} Playing statistics correct to the end of 2026.^{2} Representative statistics correct as of 2021.

Career highlights
- AFL: 2× AFL premiership player: 2019, 2020; All-Australian team: 2016; Jack Dyer Medal: 2022; 2× Gold Coast Suns Club Champion: 2015, 2016; 2× Richmond leading goalkicker: 2019, 2022; 4× Gold Coast leading goalkicker: 2014, 2015, 2016, 2017; Gold Coast captain: 2017–2018; 22under22 team: 2015

Thomas J. Lynch (born 31 October 1992) is an Australian rules footballer who plays for the Richmond Football Club in the Australian Football League (AFL) as a key forward. He previously played 131 games and kicked a then club-record 254 goals at the Gold Coast Suns after being drafted by the club with the 11th overall pick in the 2010 national draft. He served as Gold Coast's co-captain in 2017 and 2018. Lynch is a two time premiership player with Richmond, he is an All-Australian, a two-time Gold Coast club champion, four-time Gold Coast leading goalkicker, two-time Richmond leading goalkicker and one-time Richmond best and fairest.

== Early life and junior football ==
Lynch grew up in the small seaside town of Blairgowrie on Victoria's Mornington Peninsula, 87 km south of Melbourne.

He began playing junior football for the local Sorrento Football Club in the Mornington Peninsula Nepean Football League, where he won multiple premierships across his junior years. Lynch played as a centre half-forward and centre-half back as a junior, and grew 15 centimetres between the ages of 16 and 18. During this time he attended school at Padua College.

He was unable to earn selection to local TAC Cup representative team, the Dandenong Stingrays as a 16-year-old in 2009, but in 2010 played a handful of games in the early part of the year before earning selection for the Victorian Country team at the 2010 AFL Under 18 Championships. He played in all five of his side's matches that year, playing a key role in their premiership with a total of eight goals to his name and an average 13 disposals per game across the tournament. Upon returning to the TAC Cup competition, Lynch began to thrive, featuring in Dandenong's best players in each of his last seven matches.

Prior to the draft, Lynch drew comparisons to former Richmond forward Matthew Richardson for his athleticism, endurance and contested marking ability. He was also labelled by the Herald Sun as a "clone" of St Kilda's Nick Riewoldt.

At the 2010 AFL draft camp he recorded strong beep test (14.6) and three kilometre time trial results (10 minutes 41 seconds) but also recorded the slowest 20-metre sprint time (3.31 seconds) among any tested player.

== AFL career ==
=== Gold Coast (2011–2018) ===
==== 2011 season ====
Lynch was drafted to Gold Coast with the club's seventh pick and the 11th selection overall in the 2010 AFL draft.

He made his AFL debut in an eight-point win over Brisbane Lions in round 7 of the 2011 season. Lynch took a match-high nine marks in the win, as well as recording 17 disposals and kicking two goals. The following week he was again impactful, kicking two goals and being named by AFL Media as among Gold Coast's best players on the day. Lynch continued to receive AFL selection across the next five weeks, including when he kicked three goals each in consecutive matches in rounds 13 and 14. He missed one match at AFL level in round 15, returning to play a further six consecutive matches at AFL level from round 16 onward, but managing just two goals in total over that period. Lynch finished his debut season having played 13 matches at AFL level and having kicked 15 goals.

==== 2012 season ====
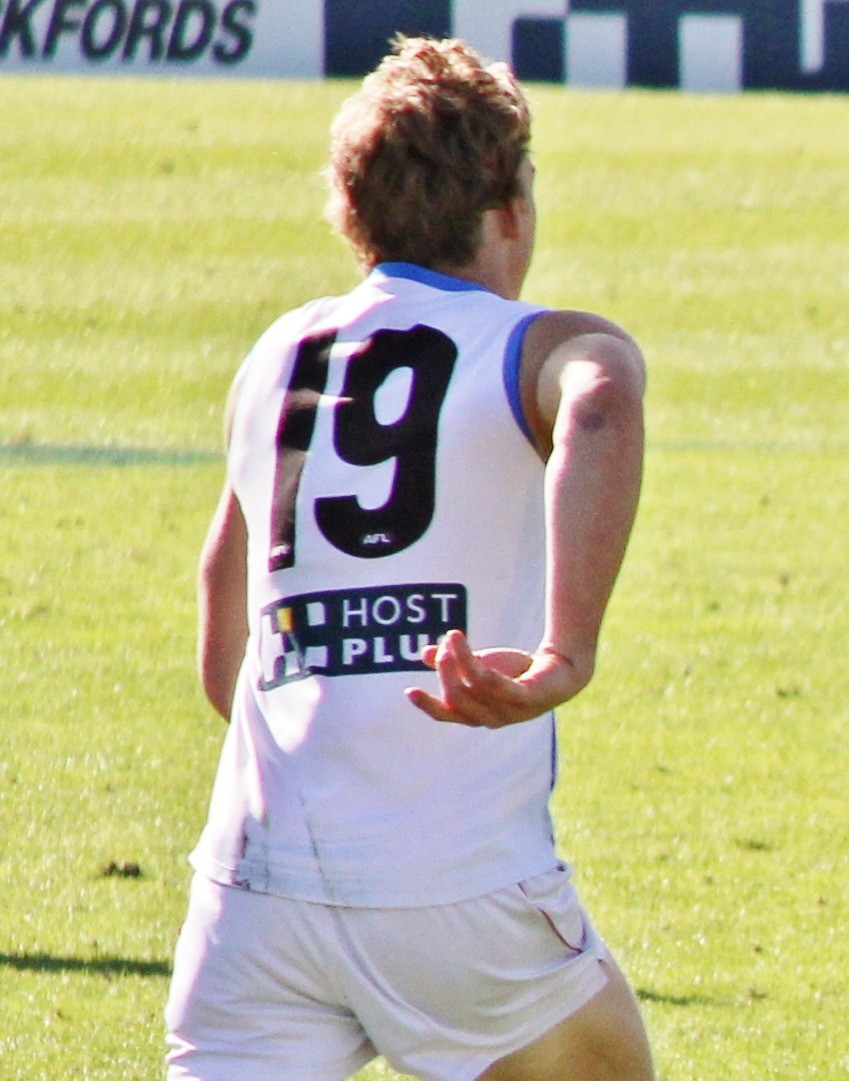
Lynch with Gold Coast in May 2012

In 2012 Lynch played a myriad of roles, not only as a tall forward but also in the ruck and as a key defender. He interchanged between those roles over the first 10 matches of the season after starting the year in the club's best 22. After kicking two goals in that period, Lynch missed the next six weeks due to injury. He made his return to football with one match with the club's reserves side in the NEAFL before regaining AFL level selection for round 17's match against Brisbane Lions. Lynch kicked a goal in that match and continued to goal in each of the next four straight matches. He kicked his only tally of multiple goals that season with a then career-best four goals in a win over Carlton in round 22 for which he earned a perfect three Brownlow Medal votes, the first votes of his career. Lynch finished 2012 having played 17 matches at AFL level for a total of 12 goals.

==== 2013 season ====
After missing the first four weeks of the season with a foot injury, Lynch opened his 2013 campaign with two goals in a win over the Giants that saw him named among the Suns' best players by AFL Media in that round 5 win. Together with a total of four goals, he managed more than 10 disposals in four of the next five matches. Lynch's best performance of the year came in round 11, where he kicked two goals in a win over North Melbourne at Metricon Stadium. The very next week Lynch suffered a significant posterior cruciate ligament knee injury when colliding with Essendon's Jake Melksham in the second quarter of the Suns' round 12 loss. He failed to return from that injury before season's end, with a further foot injury and foot surgery ensuring he finished 2013 having played just eight AFL matches and having kicked eight goals.

==== 2014 season ====
Before the beginning of the 2014 season Lynch was appointed co-vice captain of the Suns, as part of a newly expanded five-man vice captaincy group. Despite his end of season foot surgery, Lynch was back to full training by February and returned to AFL football in a round 1 win over Richmond, kicking two goals and earning a mention by AFL Media as among the Suns best players. In round 6 he kicked a career-best five goals in a win over Greater Western Sydney. He added two more the following week and was again named as one of his side's best. In May Lynch was described by AFL Media as "one of the best young forwards in the competition" and in rounds 9 and 10 he showed why, kicking four goals in each of the two wins. He played one of his only two goalless matches of the season the next week, but returned to the goalkickers list in round 12. In round 13 Lynch kicked three goals, including a near-match winner later in the fourth quarter before West Coast managed a late game-saving goal in response. A further four goals came for Lynch in round 19 before tallies of four and three to end the season in rounds 22 and 23. Lynch finished the season without missing a match, kicking a then-best total of 46 goals across 22 matches and earning the club's leading goalkicker award. For his breakout season Lynch placed second in the club's best and fairest count, just seven points shy of David Swallow's winning tally of 240.

==== 2015 season ====
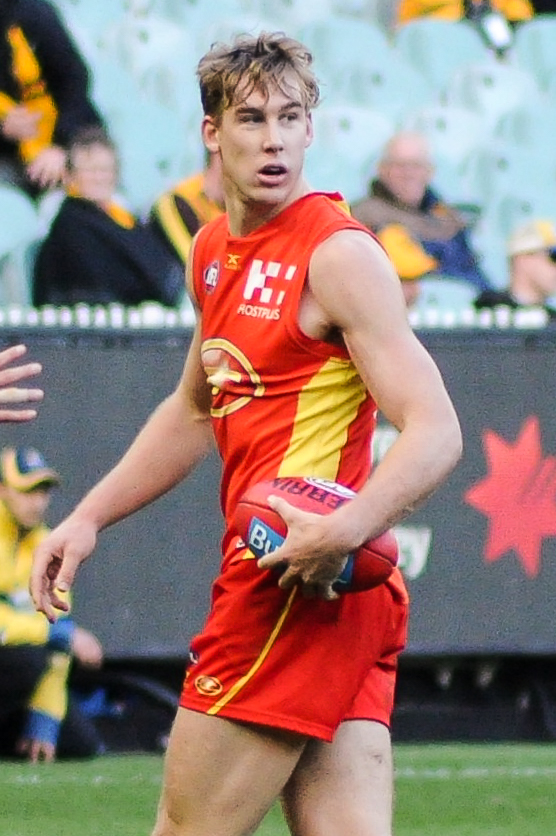
Lynch with Gold Coast in round 12, 2017

After missing the opening round due to a suspension, Lynch's 2015 season began in earnest with a loss to St Kilda in which he kicked a team-best three goals. He matched that haul the following week and was named by AFL Media as one of the Suns' best in that match. In round 7 Lynch was a late omission from the side due to a minor calf injury. He would immediately return in round 8, recording 21 disposals but going goalless in a loss to Collingwood. Lynch's next significant goalkicking tally came after the bye, when he was the Suns' best with four goals in round 13's loss to Carlton. He added a tally of four goals in round 17, before injuries to senior leaders Gary Ablett and Michael Rischitelli saw Lynch serve as club captain for the first time in round 18. He kicked another four goals in that game, including a match-saving goal in the final seconds of that draw against West Coast. The following week Lynch earned the Marcus Ashcroft Medal as best on ground with five goals in the Suns' QClash win over the Brisbane Lions in round 19. Lynch would finish the season with nine goals across his final four matches, totally 43 goals in 20 matches in 2015. He also led the league for total contested marks, with 39 recorded across those matches. For his goalkicking tally, Lynch earned his second straight club leading goalkicker award and was selected to the AFL's 22 Under 22 team that recognises the best young players in the league. He was also awarded the club's best and fairest honour, finishing narrowly above defender Kade Kolodjashnij thanks in particular to his strong form in the final two months of the season.

==== 2016 season ====
After reportedly knocking back million-dollar contract offers from other clubs in the off-season, media pundits labelled Lynch a likely choice as the Suns' next captain, while Fox Footy commentator Jonathan Brown said Lynch was "in the upper echelon of young key forwards" in the league. He continued as co-vice captain that year, and began the 2016 season by kicking four goals in a win over Essendon in round 1. Another five goals followed in round 2, before Lynch formally recommitted to the Suns by signing a new contract extension through the end of the 2018 season and reportedly worth around $800,000 per season. He extended his exceptional form over the next three weeks, kicking another 13 goals to lead the competition with 22 goals over the first five rounds of the season. At that time, Lynch also led the league in the AFL Coaches Association player of the year award. Though Lynch had dropped to third place in that same award after round 7, Jonathan Brown again heaped praise on him, anointing Lynch the best and most complete power forward in the league. By his own lofty standards, Lynch had a reduced output in the following month, next kicking four goals while also posting a new career high with seven marks inside-50 in a round 12 match against Richmond. His opponent on the day All-Australian defender Alex Rance, labelled Lynch the best key forward in the league following that match and in late June, Fox Footy's Jake Niall also praised Lynch, saying there was "no better young key forward in the game", calling him the best contested marker in the league and comparing him to former Carlton legend Stephen Kernahan. In round 15 Lynch recorded a career-best 14 marks before kicking another bag of five goals in round 16 and leading his side to a QClash win over the Brisbane Lions. Jonathan Brown again stepped up his praise for Lynch in early August, naming him the best player in the league owing to his league-leading tallies in contested marks, marks inside-50 and his significant goalkicking tally despite playing for a poorly performing team. In round 20, Lynch kicked four goals to bring himself to equal leading position in the Coleman Medal race with three-time winner Lance Franklin. Five goals over the final three matches of the season saw Lynch slip from that position, leading the club but finishing third in the league for total goals kicked that season with 66. At season's end he would receive his second successive Gold Coast Suns Club Champion award and was named to the All-Australian team in the forward pocket position. He again ranked number one in the league for contested marks that season.

==== 2017 season ====
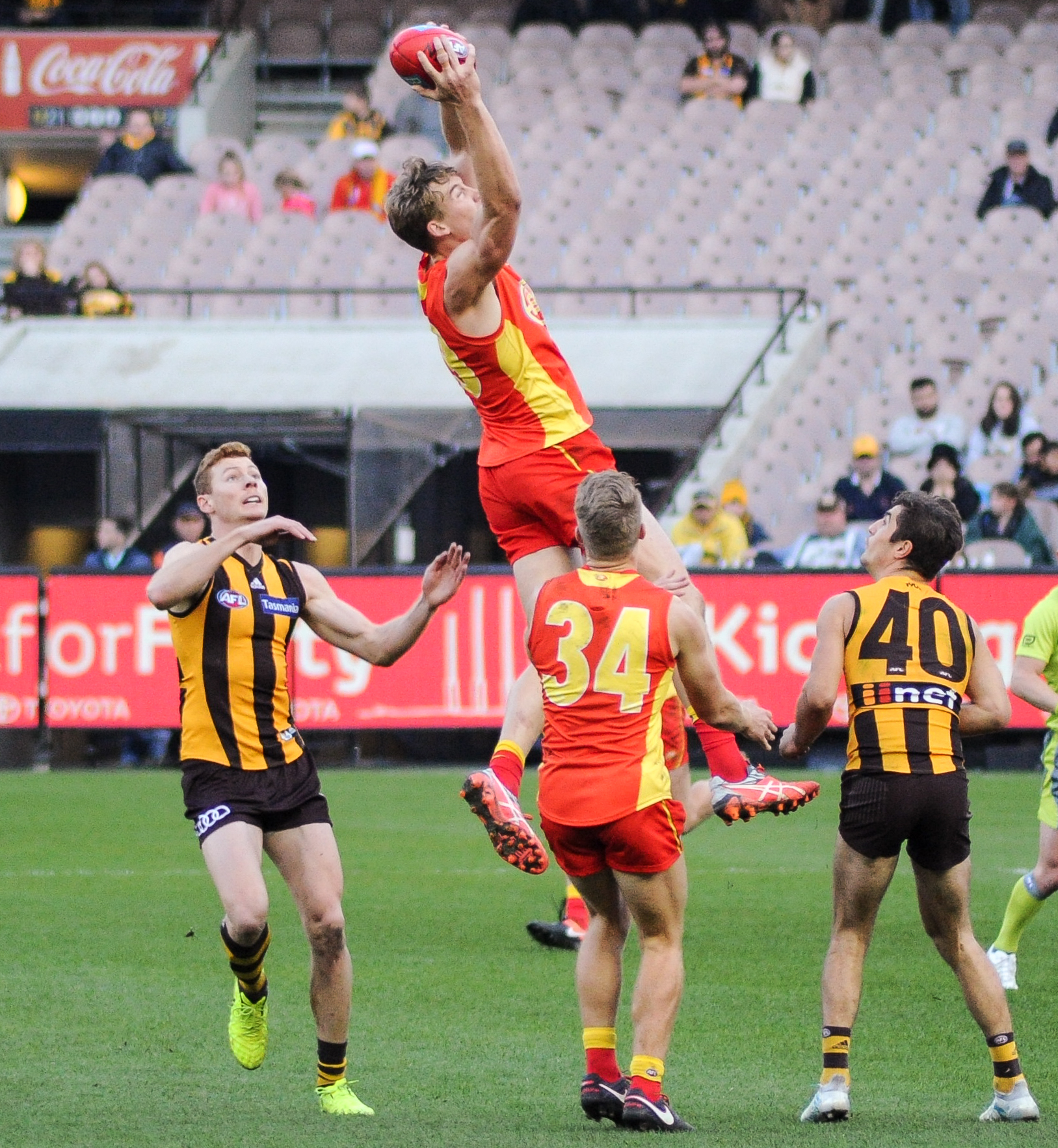
Lynch marks over his Hawthorn opponents in June 2017

In December 2016, Lynch was appointed co-captain of the Suns alongside defender Steven May after the pair shared the role in the injury absence of veteran Gary Ablett late in the 2016 season. Lynch was highly rated ahead of the 2017 season, with an AFL Players Association poll naming him the 14th best player in the league while 1116 SEN commentator Dermott Brereton went so far as to label him the best player in the competition. He opened the season with three goals against the Brisbane Lions before going goalless the following week, his first such match since round 14, 2015. In round 4 Lynch turned in a best on ground performance, lifting the Suns to a win with a career-best seven goals. The haul included five first half goals and earned him the maximum three Brownlow Medal votes for the game. He added a total of eight goals over the next three weeks before going goalless when the Suns traveled to Shanghai to play Port Adelaide in the first regular season AFL match in Asia. In round 10's Indigenous round, Lynch donned the number 50 on his guernsey, commemorating the 50th anniversary of the 1967 referendum which among other things, changed the constitution to allow Indigenous Australians to be counted with the general population in the census. After injury-affected tallies over the next month including two more goalless games, Lynch returned to his best with five goals against North Melbourne in round 15. Lynch kicked another 15 goals over the next five weeks, before sustaining an injury to the posterior cruciate ligament in his knee in round 20's match against Fremantle. The injury would see him ruled out for a least a month and in effect, for the remainder of the 2017 season. Lynch finished the season having kicked 44 goals, earning him fourth place in the club's best and fairest count.

==== 2018 season ====
In the 2017/18 off-season, media speculation suggested Lynch would be likely to leave the Suns when his contract expired and he became a free agent at the end of the 2018 season. Reports over that period claimed he would receive a seven-year contract offer from Gold Coast worth $10 million and that had already knocked back early approaches from clubs including Collingwood, Hawthorn and Richmond. Meanwhile, the Gold Coast Bulletin went so far as to claim he would attract the biggest salary in league history were he to leave the Suns. Over the period he engaged in a near-complete pre-season training schedule, while continuing reports indicated he would delay a decision on his future until at least mid-season and depending on the early performances of the Suns that season. Despite the speculation regarding his future Lynch would continue as co-captain in 2018, leading the club to consecutive wins to open the season, including setting a new career-high with eight goals against Carlton in round 2. He added a further three goals in round 4's loss to West Coast, where he also suffered a minor ankle injury. He would not miss a match as result of the injury however, kicking two goals in round 5 and in round 6, suffering a minor re-occurrence of symptoms from the PCL injury that caused him to miss matches in the previous season. Lynch spent four weeks resting the knee, before returning to football in the Suns' round 11 loss to Geelong. His scoring output was restricted in the early weeks of his return, kicking a total of four goals across his first three matches. Lynch added significant tallies in rounds 15 and 16, with three goals in each of those loses. They were to be his last matches of the season however, after continuing knee soreness led to club doctors recommending Lynch undergo PCL surgery to fully repair the lingering effects of the previous years' injury.

Meanwhile, media speculation continued over Lynch's contractual future, with reports claiming Hawthorn, Richmond and Collingwood remained front runners to sign him. In mid-July Suns coach Stuart Dew said he believed Lynch was unlikely to stay and less than a week later Collingwood coach Nathan Buckley admitted he had met with Lynch and his management about a potential Collingwood offer. In early August Lynch informed Suns players, coaches and front office staff of his intention to leave the Gold Coast and sign a free agent contract with a Melbourne-based club at the end of the season. He was reportedly met with strong criticism by teammates upon the announcement and was subsequently stripped of his captaincy by the club and stood down from all duties other than those that concerned his continuing knee injury rehabilitation. An AFL Media report that same week claimed officials at multiple clubs believed Lynch was near-certain to join Richmond despite no official decision having yet being made. The Age's Caroline Wilson reported in late August that Lynch would join Richmond and in September another report by The Age said he had informed Collingwood and Hawthorn that he would not sign with them despite refusing to confirm his decision publicly before the end of that year's finals series. Within a week of the season's end, Lynch confirmed he would sign with Richmond, accepting what was reported to be a seven-year deal worth $6.5 million, heavily backloaded and beginning with around $500,000 in its first year.

At that time he held the Gold Coast Suns club records for total goals, behinds, marks and goal assists while placing second behind only Jarrod Harbrow for most games played.

=== Richmond (2019–present) ===
==== 2019 season ====
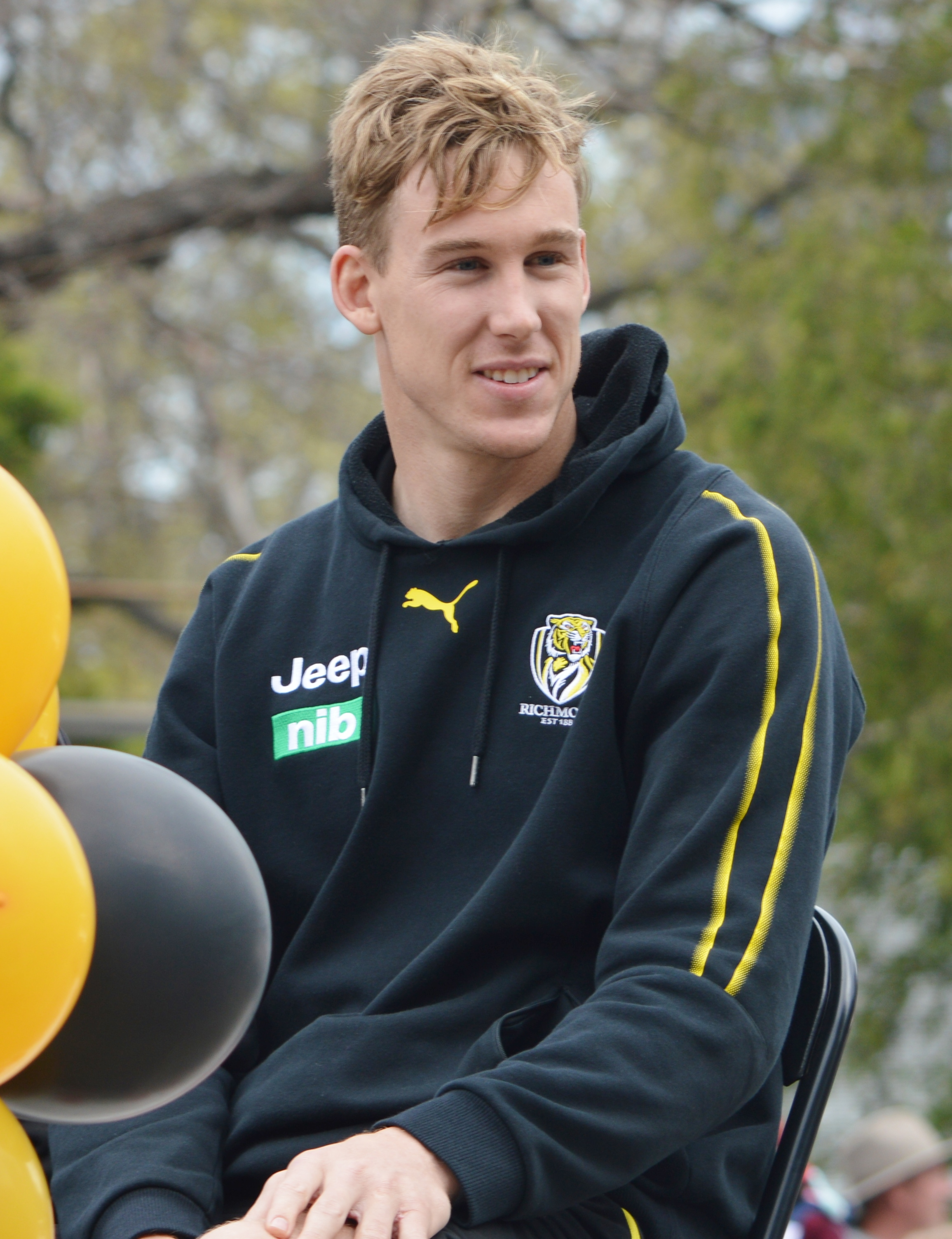
Lynch at the 2019 AFL Grand Final Parade

Lynch joined the Richmond Tigers at the age of 27.

He underwent another minor knee surgery almost immediately upon joining the club, with the goal of returning to full fitness in time for a club debut in round 1, 2019. By mid January he had resumed limited training including running at high pace and remained on schedule for the season's opening round. As part of his reduced training program, Lynch missed most of the club's match-simulation drills and both of Richmond's official pre-season matches. Despite the short lead-in, Lynch would be selected to make his Richmond debut in round 1's season-opening match against Carlton, where he kicked three goals including the first of the season. He followed that performance with another three goals in round 2, but with the loss of fellow tall-forward Jack Riewoldt to injury in that match, Lynch assumed responsibilities as the club's primary forward target in round 3. He kicked four goals in that match before adding six more in round 4's win over Port Adelaide, taking second place in the race for the Coleman Medal. Lynch's 16 goals in the first four rounds of the season marked the most by a Richmond player since Matthew Richardson kicked 20 goals to open the 1994 season. He faced a considerable drop in form over the next month however, going goalless on two occasions and scoring just one goal total in the three game period to round 7. During that period Lynch was labelled a "liability" by 3AW commentator Matthew Lloyd for his poor mobility and failure to impact games defensively. Richmond coach Damien Hardwick rebuked those comments however, claiming Lynch was performing well given his injury status and suggesting a return to his best form was yet to come. Lynch himself responded in turn, recording 15 disposals along with two goals and a match high six contested marks in round 8's win over Fremantle. After three goals in round 9, Lynch ranked third in the competition for marks inside 50, sixth for contested marks and had kicked the third most goals of any player in the league that season. In round 10 he suffered a corked calf, sitting out the final quarter of that match but not missing a further match as a result of the injury. In early June Lynch drew criticism from Seven Network commentator Wayne Carey for his continued struggles at impacting the game outside his goalscoring, with Carey highlighting poor disposal, mark and score involvement averages despite Lynch being a target of 30 per cent of Richmond forward-50 entries that season. Despite the criticism, Lynch remained highly ranked among league players for goals (fifth), contested marks (third) and marks inside-50 (fourth) at the time of Richmond's mid-season bye. Lynch begun a full load of mid-week training sessions for the first time at Richmond following the bye, and showed an immediate uplift in scoring with three goals in each of his next two matches. He was also co-best on ground with nine coaches votes in the last of those, an away win over his former side Gold Coast. Lynch retained the number one forward title even after fellow key forward Jack Riewoldt made a return from injury in round 17, kicking three goals in that match before adding three and five in rounds 18 and 19, respectively. He earned selection to AFL Media's Team of the Week in those two matches and earned 15 coaches votes total, including eight as co-best-on-ground in round 18. Lynch played his 150th career match in round 20's win over Melbourne, kicking one goal in that match before adding a total of six more over the final three matches of the home and away season. Lynch finished the regular season with the second most contested marks (47) and second most marks inside 50 (66) of any player in the league that year. Though he missed out on a spot in the All Australian team and even the squad of 40 players, Lynch was named by AFL Media as a notable exception from the squad that year. In September, Lynch played in his first AFL final, kicking two goals and taking six marks as his side defeated the higher seeded Brisbane Lions by 47 points in qualifying final at The Gabba. He was a standout best on ground in a preliminary final victory over Geelong a fortnight later, kicking a match-high five goals along with 10 marks and 19 disposals. Lynch became a premiership player the following week when his side defeated Greater Western Sydney by 89 points in the grand final. He collected seven marks and 13 disposals while kicking two goals in the match. At the end of the season and finals series he was named as the league's third best forward and 18th best player overall in the Herald Sun chief football reporter Mark Robinson's list of the league's best players in 2019. He ranked third (63) in the competition for total goals across the season and finals as well as first in both contested marks (56) and marks inside 50 (77). Lynch finished the season as Richmond's leading goalkicker and became just the third Richmond player in the past 25 years to kick 50 goals or more in a season. He also earned the Kevin Bartlett Medal as fifth placed in the club's best and fairest count that year.

==== 2020 season ====
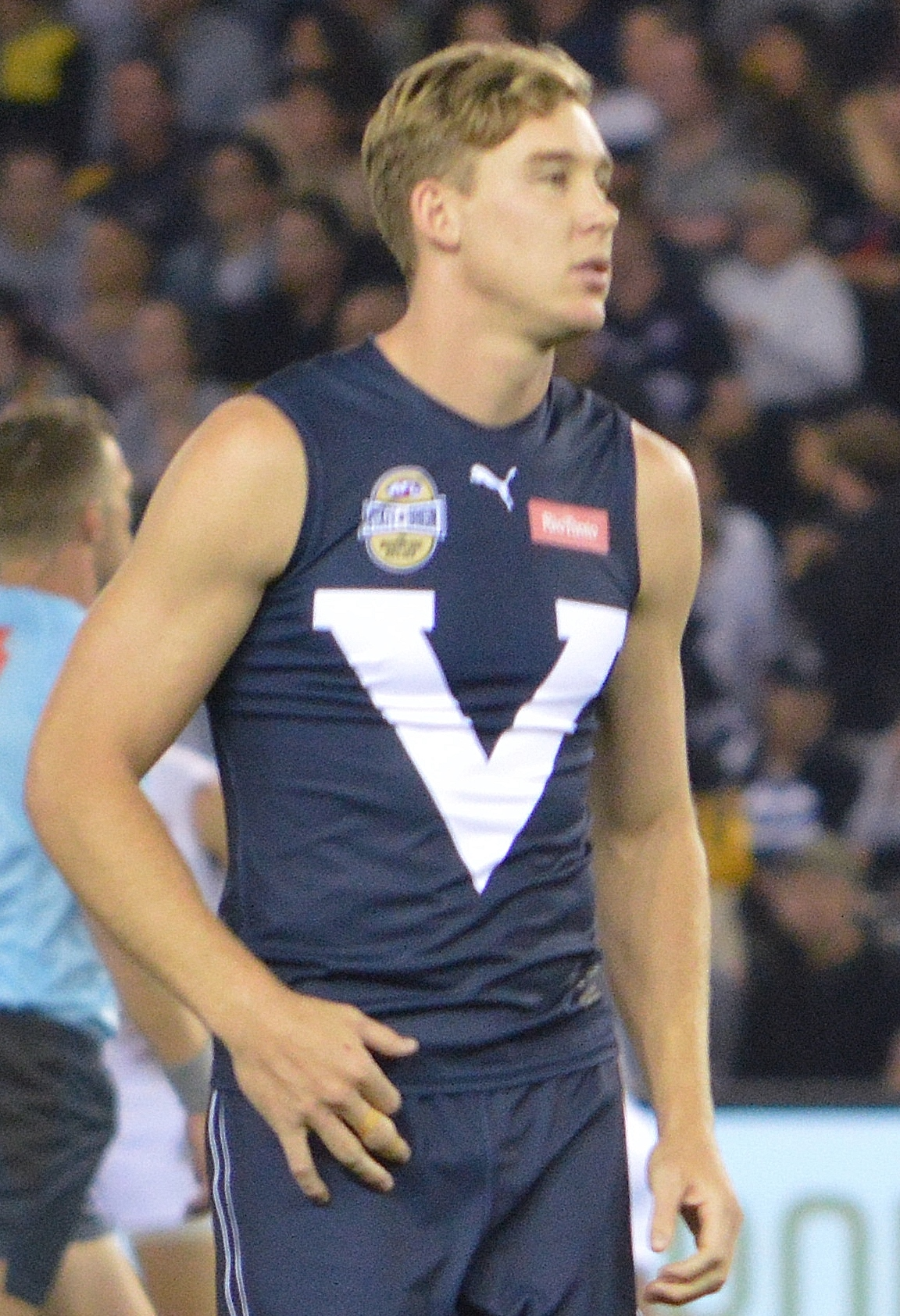
Lynch with Victoria in the 2020 State of Origin for Bushfire Relief match

Lynch completed a full training load in the 2019/20 off-season, and received a Richmond life membership for his role in the club's 2019 premiership. He played his first match of 2020 in the AFL's fundraising State of Origin for Bushfire Relief Match in February, kicking one goal in Victoria's 46-point victory over the All-Stars. He sat out Richmond's first pre-season match that same weekend but returned for the club's final pre-season match against Greater Western Sydney a week later, kicking four goals. Lynch went goalless in a round 1 win over Carlton when the season began a fortnight later under extraordinary conditions imposed on the league as a result of the rapid progression of the coronavirus pandemic into Australia. In what the league planned would be the first of a reduced 17-round season, the match was played without crowds in attendance due to public health prohibitions on large gatherings and with quarter lengths reduced by one fifth in order to reduce the physical load on players who would be expected to play multiple matches with short breaks in the second half of the year. Just three days later, the AFL Commission suspended the season for an indefinite period after multiple states enforced quarantine conditions on their borders that effectively ruled out the possibility of continuing the season as planned. Lynch kicked a game-high three goals when the season resumed with a draw against Collingwood in early-June after an 11-week hiatus. He underwent scans on a minor foot injury in the days that followed, but was available to play in his side's loss to Hawthorn in round 3. Lynch suffered a broken finger in round 5's match against Melbourne, though he would play out the match and kick three goals. He underwent surgery to repair the injury during the week that followed, and travelled to the Gold Coast on a charter jet the same day, joining other members of the club that had earlier the same day been relocated to the Gold Coast in response to a virus outbreak in Melbourne. Remarkably, Lynch was declared fit to play despite the recovering injury and contributed one goal in that weekend's win over Sydney. Lynch added another three goals in round 10's win over the Brisbane Lions, but also attracted a misconduct fine from the AFL Match Review Officer after pushing opposition defender Alex Witherden in the head. It was the first of multiple charges leveled against Lynch that month, including two separate striking charges in the club's round 12 win over Gold Coast. He received a $1,000 fine for each incident, including an off-ball strike to the stomach of defender Sam Collins that was the subject of intense media scrutiny. Scrutiny on Lynch hit a peak one week later, after he was sent directly to the AFL Tribunal for allegedly striking Essendon's Michael Hurley in the neck during the round 13 Dreamtime in Darwin game. Lynch was found not guilty of the charge and escaped sanction after arguing the action was not a punch to the neck but a push to the chest of Hurley, with the Tribunal ruling in Lynch's favour and finding the action did not constitute a reportable offence. Lynch was a prolific goalkicker over the next fortnight, kicking three goals in each of rounds 14 and 15, before sustaining a minor hamstring injury in round 17's post-bye win over Geelong. The injury saw him unable to play in the final match of the regular season and ensured he could not improve his goalkicking tally, ultimately securing equal-sixth place in the Coleman Medal race. Despite making a return to light training and having last played a full three weeks prior, Lynch was also ruled out from participating in the club's qualifying final against the Brisbane Lions. He played a starring role in his return, adding 17 disposals, six marks and two goals (from seven scoring shots), earning five coaches votes as second best on ground and helping his side to a semi-final win over St Kilda. Lynch attracted yet another AFL sanction during the match, charged with misconduct and accepting a $750 fine for kneeing the shoulder of opposition defender Dougal Howard. He added another goal in club's preliminary final victory over Port Adelaide in heavy rain, before becoming a two-time premiership player with a one-goal performance in a 31-point grand final victory over Geelong. Lynch finished the season having played 19 of a possible 21 matches, placing second in the club's goalkicking tally and 12th in the club's best and fairest count.

== Player profile ==
Lynch plays as a goalkicking full forward and centre half forward. He is notable for his contested marking ability, having led the league for most contested marks in a season on multiple occasions.

== Statistics ==
Updated to the end of round 22, 2026.

Legend
G	Goals	K	Kicks	D	Disposals	T	Tackles
B	Behinds	H	Handballs	M	Marks
#	Played in that season's premiership team	†	Led the league for the season

Season	Team	No.	Games	Totals							Averages (per game)							Votes
Season	Team	No.	Games	G	B	K	H	D	M	T	G	B	K	H	D	M	T	Votes
2011	Gold Coast	46	13	15	8	79	69	148	53	21	1.2	0.6	6.1	5.3	11.4	4.1	1.6	0
2012	Gold Coast	19	17	12	10	146	108	254	98	26	0.7	0.6	8.6	6.4	14.9	5.8	1.5	3
2013	Gold Coast	19	8	8	6	57	40	97	42	13	1.0	0.8	7.1	5.0	12.1	5.3	1.6	0
2014	Gold Coast	19	22	46	25	203	128	331	122	41	2.1	1.1	9.2	5.8	15.0	5.5	1.9	4
2015	Gold Coast	19	20	43	33	212	83	295	134	33	2.2	1.7	10.6	4.2	14.8	6.7	1.7	5
2016	Gold Coast	19	22	66	34	219	120	339	153	37	3.0	1.5	10.0	5.5	15.4	7.0	1.7	11
2017	Gold Coast	19	19	44	24	183	106	289	120	36	2.3	1.3	9.6	5.6	15.2	6.3	1.9	4
2018	Gold Coast	19	10	20	10	89	38	127	47	22	2.0	1.0	8.9	3.8	12.7	4.7	2.2	5
2019^{#}	Richmond	19	25	63	31	198	72	270	126	37	2.5	1.2	7.9	2.9	10.8	5.0	1.5	3
2020^{#}	Richmond	19	19	32	27	121	51	172	67	23	1.7	1.4	6.4	2.7	9.1	3.5	1.2	0
2021	Richmond	19	18	35	33	130	69	199	87	28	1.9	1.8	7.2	3.8	11.1	4.8	1.6	0
2022	Richmond	19	19	63	27	183	52	235	116	25	3.3^{†}	1.4	9.6	2.7	12.4	6.1	1.3	14
2023	Richmond	19	4	9	6	26	8	34	18	5	2.3	1.5	6.5	2.0	8.5	4.5	1.3	0
2024	Richmond	19	4	6	4	23	9	32	12	1	1.5	1.0	5.8	2.3	8.0	3.0	0.3	0
2025	Richmond	19	16	26	22	118	42	160	67	19	1.6	1.4	7.4	2.6	10.0	4.2	1.2	0
2026	Richmond	19	13	16	23	83	43	126	43	19	1.2	1.8	6.4	3.3	9.7	3.3	1.5	0
Career			249	504	323	2070	1038	3108	1305	386	2.0	1.3	8.3	4.2	12.5	5.2	1.6	49

== Honours and achievements ==
Team

- 2× AFL premiership player (Richmond): 2019, 2020

Individual

- All-Australian team: 2016
- 2× Gold Coast Suns Club Champion: 2015, 2016
- 4× Gold Coast leading goalkicker: 2014, 2015, 2016, 2017
- Richmond leading goalkicker: 2019, 2022
- Gold Coast co-captain: 2017–2018
- Kevin Bartlett Medal (5th place, Richmond B&F): 2019
- Gold Coast co-vice captain: 2014–2016
- 22under22 team: 2015
- Marcus Ashcroft Medal: 2015

Junior

- U18 national champion: 2010

== Personal life ==
Lynch's younger sister, Beth, is also a footballer who played with Richmond in the 2018 VFLW season before being signed by North Melbourne for the 2019 and 2020 AFLW seasons.

In the off-season between the 2022 and 2023 AFL Seasons, Lynch proposed to his girlfriend Olivia Burke at a dog park with their dog Gryff.
