= Alex Sexton =

Australian rules footballer (born 1993)

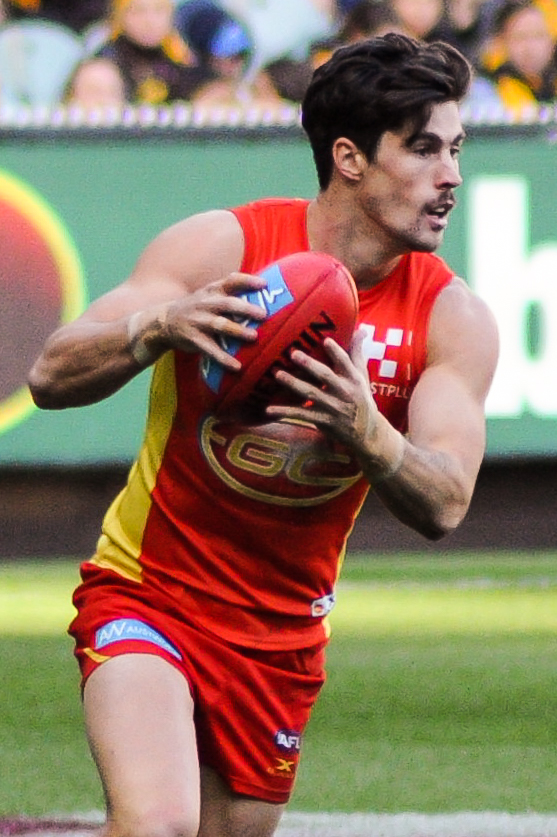
- Sexton playing for Gold Coast in June 2017

Personal information
- Full name: Alex Sexton
- Born: 3 December 1993 (age 32); Melbourne
- Original team: Keon Park Stars JFC/Springwood (QAFL)
- Draft: No. 88, 2011 National draft, Gold Coast
- Height: 186 cm (6 ft 1 in)
- Weight: 83 kg (183 lb)
- Position: Forward

Club information
- Current club: Gold Coast reserves
- Number: 13

Playing career^{1}
Years	Club	Games (Goals)
2012–2025	Gold Coast	186 (164)
- ^{1} Playing statistics correct to the end of the 2025 season.

Career highlights
- 2× Gold Coast leading goalkicker: 2018, 2019; VFL premiership player: 2023

Alex Sexton (born 3 December 1993) is a professional Australian rules footballer who currently plays for the Gold Coast Suns in the Victorian Football League (VFL), having previously played for the Suns in the Australian Football League (AFL).

== Early life ==
Sexton was born in Melbourne attending St Monica's College, Epping. Sexton and his family moved to Logan, Queensland in his teens where he attended Chisholm Catholic College. He played junior football for the Keon Park Stars when he was in Melbourne then the Springwood Pumas before making his NEAFL debut for the Gold Coast Suns' reserves team in 2011. A Queensland representative at both U16 and U18 levels, Sexton was awarded the Alan McLean Medal as the division two best and fairest as well as QLD's MVP award at the 2010 NAB Australian U16 Championships. He was drafted by the Gold Coast Suns as a zone selection with pick 88 in the 2011 AFL draft.

== AFL career ==
Sexton joined the Suns for his first preseason training camp in Arizona as a 17-year-old in 2011. He made his AFL debut in Round 8, 2012, against the Western Bulldogs at Marrara Oval. His breakout season came in 2018 when he played all 22 AFL games for the Suns and was the leading goalkicker for the club that season. Sexton played his 100th AFL game for the Gold Coast against the Western Bulldogs in Round 3 of the 2019 AFL season.

Following the 2025 season, Sexton was not be offered a contract by the Suns for 2026. He left the club after 186 games and 164 goals over 14 seasons.

== Statistics ==
Updated to the end of the 2025 season.

Legend
G	Goals	K	Kicks	D	Disposals	T	Tackles
B	Behinds	H	Handballs	M	Marks

Season	Team	No.	Games	Totals							Averages (per game)							Votes
Season	Team	No.	Games	G	B	K	H	D	M	T	G	B	K	H	D	M	T	Votes
2012	Gold Coast	37	6	1	1	38	12	50	18	10	0.2	0.2	6.3	2.0	8.3	3.0	1.7	0
2013	Gold Coast	6	4	3	4	20	8	28	7	8	0.8	1.0	5.0	2.0	7.0	1.8	2.0	0
2014	Gold Coast	6	14	6	7	73	48	121	25	26	0.4	0.5	5.2	3.4	8.6	1.8	1.9	0
2015	Gold Coast	6	13	8	3	102	44	146	32	29	0.6	0.2	7.8	3.4	11.2	2.5	2.2	0
2016	Gold Coast	6	18	13	8	179	105	284	58	47	0.7	0.4	9.9	5.8	15.8	3.2	2.6	0
2017	Gold Coast	6	20	12	7	198	116	314	93	28	0.6	0.4	9.9	5.8	15.7	4.7	1.4	0
2018	Gold Coast	6	22	28	19	202	98	300	72	51	1.3	0.9	9.2	4.5	13.6	3.3	2.3	1
2019	Gold Coast	6	22	39	29	187	65	252	72	42	1.8	1.3	8.5	3.0	11.5	3.3	1.9	0
2020 (Note: The 2020 season was played with 17 home-and-away matches per team (down from 22) and 16-minute quarters with time on (down from 20-minute quarters with time on) due to the impact of the COVID-19 pandemic.)	Gold Coast	6	14	19	12	103	28	131	44	22	1.4	0.9	7.4	2.0	9.4	3.1	1.6	1
2021	Gold Coast	6	21	21	14	167	50	217	87	23	1.0	0.7	8.0	2.4	10.3	4.1	1.1	0
2022	Gold Coast	6	4	7	4	19	4	23	8	1	1.8	1.0	4.8	1.0	5.8	2.0	0.3	1
2023	Gold Coast	6	8	5	4	29	14	43	14	5	0.6	0.5	3.6	1.8	5.4	1.8	0.6	0
2024	Gold Coast	6	15	2	3	193	97	290	87	29	0.1	0.2	12.9	6.5	19.3	5.8	1.9	0
2025	Gold Coast	6	5	0	3	13	7	20	8	3	0.0	0.6	2.6	1.4	4.0	1.6	0.6	0
Career			186	164	118	1523	696	2219	625	324	0.9	0.6	8.2	3.7	11.9	3.4	1.7	3
