= Jarrod Witts =

Australian rules footballer (born 1992)

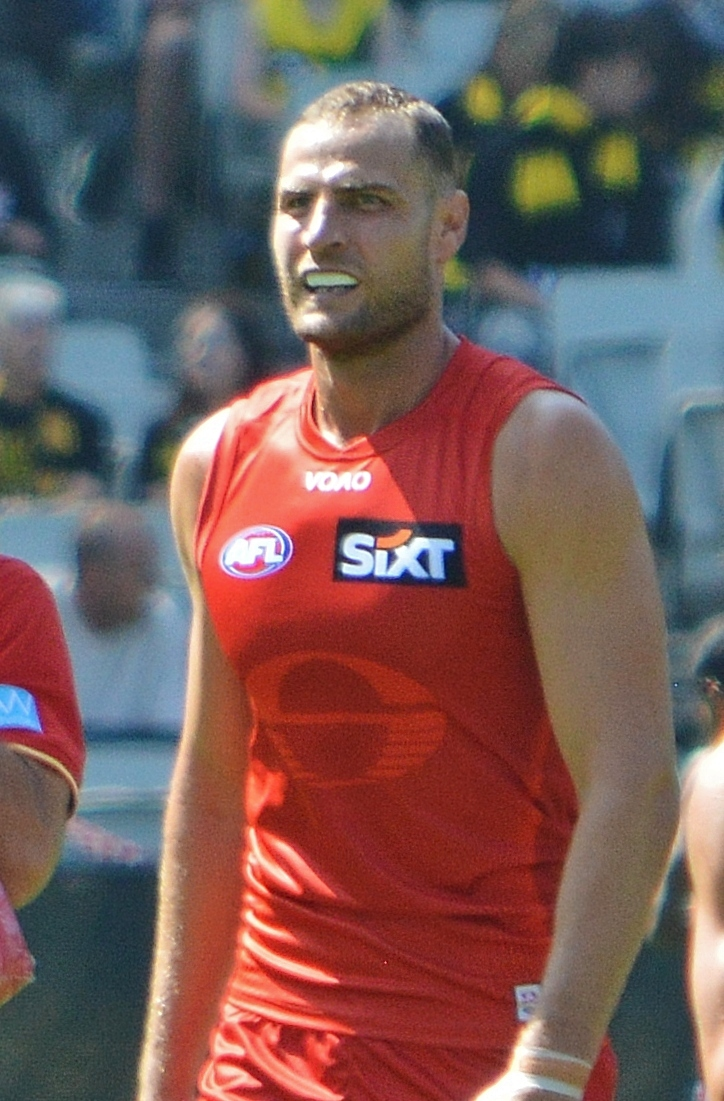
- Witts in March 2026

Personal information
- Born: September 13, 1992 (age 34); Sydney, New South Wales
- Original team: St Ives/Sydney University
- Draft: No. 67, 2011 national draft
- Height: 208 cm (6 ft 10 in)
- Weight: 111 kg (245 lb)
- Position: Ruck

Club information
- Current club: Gold Coast
- Number: 28

Playing career^{1}
Years	Club	Games (Goals)
2012–2016	Collingwood	40 (18)
2017–	Gold Coast	177 (29)
Total		217 (47)
- ^{1} Playing statistics correct to the end of round 22, 2026.

Career highlights
- Gold Coast co-captain: 2019–2024; Gold Coast Suns Club Champion: 2019; 22under22 team: 2014

Jarrod Witts (born 13 September 1992) is a professional Australian rules footballer playing for the Gold Coast Football Club in the Australian Football League (AFL). He previously played for the Collingwood Football Club from 2012 to 2016. Witts was appointed Gold Coast co-captain along with David Swallow from the 2019 season.

== Early life ==
Witts was born in Sydney and grew up in the northern suburb of Normanhurst. He attended Barker College on the North Shore of Sydney. His first sporting interest was Australian rules football and he would often attend Sydney Swans home games in his youth. In 1999, Witts was in attendance at the Sydney Cricket Ground the day Tony Lockett broke Gordon Coventry's all-time goal kicking record and ran onto the field after the historic achievement.

Despite his early interest in Australian rules football, Witts switched allegiances later in childhood and took up rugby union in winter and cricket in the summer months throughout his adolescence. At the age of 15, he was convinced by school friends to try Australian rules football again and joined the under-16 side at the St Ives Football Club. In just his third game for St Ives, Witts was scouted by Collingwood employee Rod Carter, who informed the Magpies' recruiting manager Derek Hine of Witts' potential. A week later, Hine offered Witts a NSW scholarship to join Collingwood and the deal was accepted.

In 2009, he joined Sydney University's under-18s team and continued his development. As a part of the NSW scholarship program, Witts played numerous games for Greater Western Sydney's TAC Cup team in 2010. The following year saw him elevated to Collingwood's senior list and his AFL journey began.

== AFL career ==
He made his AFL debut for Collingwood against St Kilda in Round 6 of the 2013 AFL season. At the conclusion of the 2016 season, he was traded to the Gold Coast Football Club.

On 16 January he signed a contract extension until the end of the 2024 season, where he'll be an unrestricted free agent. In February 2019, Witts was named as Gold Coast co-captain, alongside David Swallow. Standing at 209cm, Witts is the tallest captain in AFL/VFL history. A record formerly held by Steven King at 202cm. At the end of the 2019 AFL season, he broke the record for the most hitouts in a home-and-away season (excluding finals) with 1008.

As of the start of the 2022 AFL season, Witts was the equal-fourth-tallest player in the AFL.

== Statistics ==
Updated to the end of round 22, 2026.

Legend
G	Goals	K	Kicks	D	Disposals	T	Tackles
B	Behinds	H	Handballs	M	Marks	H/O	Hit-outs
†	Led the league for the season

Season	Team	No.	Games	Totals								Averages (per game)								Votes
Season	Team	No.	Games	G	B	K	H	D	M	T	H/O	G	B	K	H	D	M	T	H/O	Votes
2012	Collingwood	15	0	—	—	—	—	—	—	—	—	—	—	—	—	—	—	—	—	0
2013	Collingwood	15	7	5	3	29	35	64	23	20	74	0.7	0.4	4.1	5.0	9.1	3.3	2.9	10.6	0
2014	Collingwood	15	20	8	4	108	91	199	57	70	375	0.4	0.2	5.4	4.6	10.0	2.9	3.5	18.8	0
2015	Collingwood	15	11	5	4	58	57	115	23	41	245	0.5	0.4	5.3	5.2	10.5	2.1	3.7	22.3	0
2016	Collingwood	15	2	0	1	8	8	16	3	8	31	0.0	0.5	4.0	4.0	8.0	1.5	4.0	15.5	0
2017	Gold Coast	28	18	2	4	112	128	240	46	64	682	0.1	0.2	6.2	7.1	13.3	2.6	3.6	37.9	1
2018	Gold Coast	28	22	2	6	156	144	300	46	86	854	0.1	0.3	7.1	6.5	13.6	2.1	3.9	38.8	2
2019	Gold Coast	28	22	3	3	188	132	320	64	67	1007	0.1	0.1	8.5	6.0	14.5	2.9	3.0	45.8^{†}	1
2020 (Note: The 2020 season was played with 17 home-and-away matches per team (down from 22) and 16-minute quarters with time on (down from 20-minute quarters with time on) due to the impact of the COVID-19 pandemic.)	Gold Coast	28	17	0	3	98	72	170	37	28	476	0.0	0.2	5.8	4.2	10.0	2.2	1.6	28.0	2
2021	Gold Coast	28	3	0	1	24	17	41	9	8	87	0.0	0.3	8.0	5.7	13.7	3.0	2.7	29.0	0
2022	Gold Coast	28	22	4	2	164	129	293	55	63	833^{†}	0.2	0.1	7.5	5.9	13.3	2.5	2.9	37.9	4
2023	Gold Coast	28	21	4	2	151	139	290	51	55	824	0.2	0.1	7.2	6.6	13.8	2.4	2.6	39.2^{†}	0
2024	Gold Coast	28	16	8	3	113	109	222	39	63	600	0.5	0.2	7.1	6.8	13.9	2.4	3.9	37.5	1
2025	Gold Coast	28	24	4	4	119	187	306	38	82	1040^{†}	0.2	0.2	5.0	7.8	12.8	1.6	3.4	43.3	3
2026	Gold Coast	28	12	2	1	66	61	127	18	23	361	0.2	0.1	5.5	5.1	10.6	1.5	1.9	30.1	0
Career			217	47	41	1394	1309	2703	509	678	7489	0.2	0.2	6.4	6.0	12.5	2.3	3.1	34.5	14
