= Ben King (footballer) =

Australian rules football player

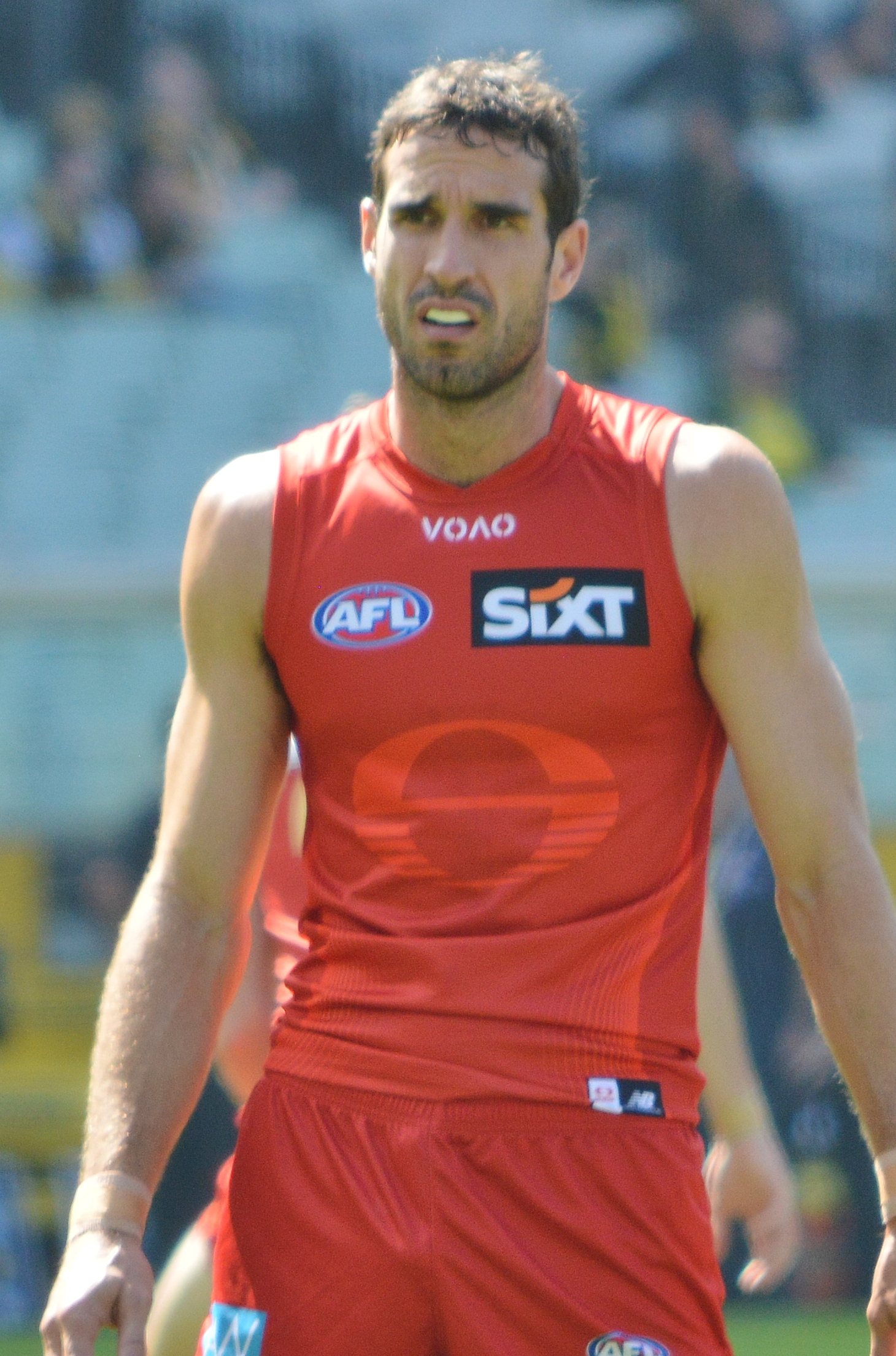
- King playing for Gold Coast in March 2026

Personal information
- Full name: Benjamin King
- Nickname: Kingy
- Born: 7 July 2000 (age 26); Melbourne, Victoria
- Original team: Sandringham Dragons (TAC Cup)
- Draft: No. 6, 2018 national draft
- Height: 202 cm (6 ft 8 in)
- Weight: 96 kg (212 lb)
- Position: Full-forward

Club information
- Current club: Hawthorn

Playing career^{1}
Years	Club	Games (Goals)
2019–2026	Gold Coast	143 (315)
2027–	Hawthorn	0 (0)
Total		143 (315)

Representative team honours^{2}
Years	Team	Games (Goals)
2026	Victoria	1 (4)
- ^{1} Playing statistics correct to the end of the 2026 season.^{2} Representative statistics correct as of 2026.

Career highlights
- 6× Gold Coast leading Goalkicker: 2020, 2021, 2023, 2024, 2025, 2026; 2× 22under22 team: 2020, 2021; AFL Rising Star nominee: 2019

Ben King (born 7 July 2000) is a professional Australian rules footballer playing for the Hawthorn Football Club in the Australian Football League (AFL), having previously played for the Gold Coast Suns. His twin brother, Max King, also plays football professionally for St Kilda.

== Early life ==
King was born in Melbourne, Victoria, and grew up in the suburb of Hampton. He and his identical twin brother Max began playing Australian rules football for the East Sandringham Football Club in the South Metro Junior Football League. The twins worked their way through the junior ranks before both being selected to represent the Sandringham Dragons in the TAC Cup while also attending Haileybury. Through their time at Haileybury the twins were closely mentored by three time Coleman Medal winner Matthew Lloyd.

Ben's draft stocks rose in his final year of junior football when his twin brother's ACL injury allowed him to play as the key forward for the Victoria Metro team at the U18 National Championships. He was subsequently named the All-Australian full forward for his performances during the championships. His junior football came to an end in mid-September 2018 when Sandringham fell to Dandenong in the TAC Cup preliminary final. In November 2018, he was drafted by Gold Coast with the sixth selection in the 2018 national draft.

King earned an ATAR score of 96.35 upon graduation from high school.

== AFL career ==
King made his AFL debut for Gold Coast against Port Adelaide in the ninth round of the 2019 AFL season. In round 19 of the 2019 season, he earned a nomination for the 2019 AFL Rising Star after a four goal performance while playing on highly experienced Essendon defender Cale Hooker. King rejected offers to return to Victoria in October 2019 by signing a two-year contract extension with the Suns.

He suffered the same injury as his brother, a torn right ACL on the eve of the 2022 AFL season and missed the entire season. It was initially feared that King might have played his final match for the Suns, given he was out of contract at the conclusion of the year. Despite lucrative offers from several Victorian clubs, he eventually signed a two-year contract, showing his loyalty and commitment to the club and its future.

King returned to action in round 1 of the 2023 AFL season and, after several quiet weeks, he found form and put together two strong performances in round 6 and 7 that included 9 goals. In May, he reaffirmed that he was settled on the Gold Coast and intended to remain with the Suns long-term.

On 21 August 2026, King confirmed he would leave the Suns at the end of the season.

On 9 October 2026, King officially signed with the Hawks, leaving as a restricted free agent on a seven-year deal that would see him as a Hawk until the end of 2034. The Suns did not match the bid, and received pick TBA as compensation in the 2026 Telstra AFL Draft.

== Statistics ==
Updated to the end of 2026.

Legend
G	Goals	K	Kicks	D	Disposals	T	Tackles
B	Behinds	H	Handballs	M	Marks

Season	Team	No.	Games	Totals							Averages (per game)							Votes
Season	Team	No.	Games	G	B	K	H	D	M	T	G	B	K	H	D	M	T	Votes
2019	Gold Coast	34	14	17	9	65	34	99	48	10	1.2	0.6	4.6	2.4	7.1	3.4	0.7	0
2020 (Note: The 2020 season was played with 17 home-and-away matches per team (down from 22) and 16-minute quarters with time on (down from 20-minute quarters with time on) due to the impact of the COVID-19 pandemic.)	Gold Coast	34	17	25	20	88	33	121	48	7	1.5	1.2	5.2	1.9	7.1	2.8	0.4	1
2021	Gold Coast	34	22	47	25	126	54	180	90	17	2.1	1.1	5.7	2.5	8.2	4.1	0.8	3
2023	Gold Coast	34	20	40	21	112	46	158	67	9	2.0	1.1	5.6	2.3	7.9	3.4	0.5	7
2024	Gold Coast	34	22	55	26	141	35	176	98	13	2.5	1.2	6.4	1.6	8.0	4.5	0.6	3
2025	Gold Coast	34	25	71	23	129	54	183	81	16	2.8	0.9	5.2	2.2	7.3	3.2	0.6	7
2026	Gold Coast	34	23	60	26	127	48	175	84	14	2.6	1.1	5.5	2.1	7.6	3.7	0.6	4
Career			143	315	150	788	304	1092	516	86	2.2	1.1	5.5	2.1	7.6	3.6	0.6	25
