= 2012 Gold Coast Suns season =

Coordinates: 28°00′23″S 153°22′2″E

Gold Coast Suns
2012 season
- President: John Witheriff
- Coach: Guy McKenna
- Captain: Gary Ablett, Jr.
- Home ground: Metricon Stadium
- NAB Cup: 16th
- AFL season: 17th
- Best and Fairest: Gary Ablett, Jr.
- Leading goalkicker: Gary Ablett, Jr. (26 goals)
- Highest home attendance: 17,069

The 2012 AFL season was the Gold Coast Suns' second season in the Australian Football League (AFL). The team is based on the Gold Coast, Queensland, Australia. The Gold Coast Suns reserves team also competed in the NEAFL.

== Draft picks ==
| Round | Pick | Player | State/Nationality | Recruited From | League |
|---|---|---|---|---|---|
| 1 | 24 | Henry Schade | Tasmania | North Hobart Demons | TFL |
| 5 | 80 | Alik Magin | Queensland | Rookie Promotion | |
| 6 | 88 | Alex Sexton | Queensland | Redland Bombers | NEAFL |
| 7 | 91 | Jackson Allen | Queensland | Morningside Panthers | NEAFL |
Pre-season Draft
| 1 | 7 | Aaron Hall | Tasmania | Hobart Tigers | TFL |
Rookie Draft
| 1 | 2 | Kyal Horsley | Western Australia | Subiaco Lions | WAFL |
| 2 | 20 | Andrew McQualter | (Victoria (state)) Victoria | St Kilda Saints | AFL |
| 3 | 38 | Michael Coad | South Australia | Rookie Listed from Senior List | |
| 9 | 94 | Josh Hall | Queensland | Curra Swans | AFL Townsville |
Mini-Draft^{[a]}
| 1 | 1 | Jaeger O'Meara | Western Australia | Perth Demons | WAFL |

^{a} The mini-draft allowed teams to pre-list players for the following season.

== Transactions ==
=== Overview ===
Players Added

Via trade

- Matthew Warnock

Via free agency
-

Players Lost

Via trade
-
Via free agency
-

=== Trades ===
12 October 2011

To Greater Western Sydney Giants
- No. 4 Pick
- Compensation First Round Pick
To Gold Coast Suns
- Mini-Draft No. 1 Pick
- No. 31 Pick
17 October 2011

To Collingwood Magpies
- Peter Yagmoor
- No. 50 Pick
To Gold Coast Suns
- No. 47 Pick
17 October 2011

To Brisbane Lions, Melbourne Demons
- Dayne Zorko
- No. 47 Pick
To Gold Coast Suns
- Matthew Warnock
17 October 2011

To Geelong Cats
- No. 32 Pick
- No. 34 Pick
To Gold Coast Suns
- No. 26 Pick
17 October 2011

To Adelaide Crows
- No. 27 Pick
- No. 31 Pick
- No. 68 Pick
To Gold Coast Suns
- No. 24 Pick
17 October 2011

To Richmond Tigers
- No. 26 Pick
- Compensation Second Round Pick
To Gold Coast Suns
- Compensation First Round Pick

== Delistings ==
Delstings made in November 2011

| Player | Age | Seasons | Games |
|---|---|---|---|
| Daniel Harris | 29 | 1 | 11 |
| Rex Liddy | 19 | 1 | 3 |
| Nathan Ablett | 25 | 1 | 2 |
| Michael Coad | 28 | 1 | 2 |
| Joel Tippett | 23 | 1 | 2 |
| Marc Lock | 19 | 1 | 1 |
| Roland Ah Chee | 20 | 1 | 0 |
| Jake Crawford | 19 | 1 | 0 |
| Jack Stanlake | 20 | 1 | 0 |
| Jack Stanley | 21 | 1 | 0 |

| = Retired |

== 2012 playing list ==
Senior list
| No. | Born | Player | Hgt | Wgt | Date of birth | Age in 2012 | Debut | Recruited from | 2012 Games | 2012 Goals | Career Games | Career Goals |
|---|---|---|---|---|---|---|---|---|---|---|---|---|
| 2 | (Queensland) | Zac Smith | 205 | 97 | 22 February 1990 | 22 | 2011 | Southport Sharks | 16 | 5 | 36 | 19 |
| 3 | (Northern Territory) | Jared Brennan | 195 | 95 | 28 July 1984 | 28 | 2003 | Brisbane Lions | 17 | 7 | 158 | 93 |
| 4 | (Tasmania) | Maverick Weller | 182 | 79 | 13 February 1992 | 20 | 2011 | Burnie Dockers | 13 | 1 | 28 | 3 |
| 5 | (Queensland) | Jarrod Harbrow | 178 | 74 | 18 July 1988 | 24 | 2007 | Western Bulldogs | 13 | 3 | 105 | 26 |
| 6 | (Queensland) | Alik Magin | 181 | 72 | 13 April 1991 | 21 | 2011 | Labrador Tigers | 5 | 2 | 8 | 3 |
| 7 | (Queensland) | Karmichael Hunt | 186 | 92 | 17 November 1986 | 26 | 2011 | N/A | 18 | 3 | 34 | 4 |
| 8 | (Tasmania) | Luke Russell | 186 | 78 | 24 January 1992 | 20 | 2011 | Burnie Dockers |
| 9 | (Victoria (state)) | Gary Ablett, Jr. | 182 | 85 | 14 May 1984 | 28 | 2002 | Geelong Cats |
| 10 | (Queensland) | Lewis Moss | 195 | 80 | 4 February 1992 | 20 | **** | Port Douglas AFC |
| 11 | (Western Australia) | Harley Bennell | 185 | 74 | 2 October 1992 | 20 | 2011 | Peel Thunder |
| 12 | (South Australia) | Sam Day | 196 | 96 | 6 September 1992 | 20 | 2011 | Sturt Blues |
| 13 | (South Australia) | Hayden Jolly | 184 | 83 | 4 April 1992 | 20 | 2011 | Glenelg Tigers |
| 14 | (Victoria (state)) | Matthew Warnock | 194 | 95 | 3 April 1984 | 28 | 2006 | Melbourne Demons |
| 15 | (Victoria (state)) | Piers Flanagan | 189 | 74 | 31 March 1992 | 20 | 2012 | Geelong Falcons |
| 16 | (Queensland) | Rory Thompson | 200 | 91 | 12 March 1991 | 21 | 2011 | Southport Sharks |
| 17 | (Victoria (state)) | Josh Fraser | 202 | 100 | 5 January 1982 | 30 | 2000 | Collingwood Magpies |
| 18 | (Victoria (state)) | Trent McKenzie | 191 | 82 | 3 April 1992 | 20 | 2011 | Western Jets |
| 19 | (Victoria (state)) | Thomas Lynch | 199 | 91 | 31 October 1992 | 20 | 2011 | Dandenong Stingrays |
| 20 | (Victoria (state)) | Josh Toy | 185 | 87 | 18 April 1992 | 20 | 2011 | Calder Cannons |
| 21 | (Victoria (state)) | Jeremy Taylor | 191 | 83 | 17 June 1992 | 20 | 2011 | Geelong Falcons |
| 22 | (Victoria (state)) | Tom Nicholls | 201 | 93 | 4 March 1992 | 20 | 2011 | Sandringham Dragons |
| 23 | (Queensland) | Charlie Dixon | 202 | 107 | 23 September 1990 | 22 | 2011 | Redland Bombers |
| 24 | (Western Australia) | David Swallow | 186 | 83 | 19 November 1992 | 20 | 2011 | East Fremantle Sharks |
| 25 | (Victoria (state)) | Daniel Stanley | 187 | 88 | 18 February 1988 | 24 | 2007 | Collingwood Magpies |
| 26 | (Victoria (state)) | Matt Shaw | 187 | 71 | 5 February 1992 | 20 | 2011 | Dandenong Stingrays |
| 28 | (Victoria (state)) | Josh Caddy | 186 | 82 | 28 September 1992 | 20 | 2011 | Northern Knights |
| 29 | (Victoria (state)) | Taylor Hine | 184 | 75 | 24 January 1992 | 20 | 2011 | Calder Cannons |
| 30 | (Western Australia) | Campbell Brown | 179 | 81.5 | 28 August 1983 | 29 | 2002 | Hawthorn Hawks |
| 31 | (Queensland) | Jackson Allen | 179 | 75 | 14 April 1993 | 19 | 2012 | Morningside Panthers |
| 32 | (Western Australia) | Brandon Matera | 175 | 65 | 11 March 1992 | 20 | 2011 | South Fremantle Bulldogs |
| 33 | (Tasmania) | Aaron Hall | 186 | 78 | 9 November 1990 | 22 | 2012 | Hobart Tigers |
| 34 | (Victoria (state)) | Jack Hutchins | 191 | 92 | 20 February 1992 | 20 | 2011 | Sandringham Dragons |
| 35 | (Victoria (state)) | Michael Rischitelli | 184 | 81.6 | 8 January 1986 | 26 | 2004 | Brisbane Lions |
| 36 | (Tasmania) | Sam Iles | 185 | 83 | 19 June 1985 | 27 | 2006 | Box Hill Hawks |
| 37 | (Queensland) | Alex Sexton | 185 | 71 | 3 December 1993 | 19 | 2012 | Redland Bombers |
| 38 | (Queensland) | Joel Wilkinson | 186 | 81 | 29 November 1991 | 21 | 2011 | Broadbeach Cats |
| 40 | (Queensland) | Tom Hickey | 201.4 | 87.4 | 6 March 1991 | 21 | 2011 | Morningside Panthers |
| 41 | (Victoria (state)) | Dion Prestia | 175 | 82 | 12 October 1992 | 20 | 2011 | Calder Cannons |
| 43 | (Northern Territory) | Liam Patrick | 189 | 71.9 | 4 March 1988 | 24 | 2011 | Wanderers Eagles |
| 44 | (South Australia) | Nathan Bock | 193 | 93 | 20 March 1983 | 29 | 2004 | Adelaide Crows |
| 45 | (Northern Territory) | Steven May | 190 | 93 | 10 January 1992 | 20 | 2011 | Melbourne Grammar School |
| 47 | (South Australia) | Daniel Gorringe | 200 | 88 | 2 June 1992 | 20 | 2011 | Norwood Redlegs |
| 48 | (Victoria (state)) | Seb Tape | 191 | 81 | 6 August 1992 | 20 | 2011 | Glenelg Tigers |
| 49 | (Tasmania) | Jacob Gillbee | 184 | 76 | 13 September 1992 | 20 | 2011 | Lauderdale Bombers |
| 50 | (Tasmania) | Henry Schade | 196 | 81 | 8 August 1993 | 19 | **** | North Hobart Demons |
| 52 | (Western Australia) | Nathan Krakouer | 182 | 78 | 5 May 1988 | 24 | 2007 | Port Adelaide Power |
Rookie list
| No. | Born | Player | Hgt | Wgt | Date of birth | Age in 2012 | Debut | Recruited from | 2012 Games | 2012 Goals | Career Games | Career Goals |
| 27 | (South Australia) | Michael Coad | 190 | 86 | 13 September 1983 | 29 | 2011 | Sturt Blues | 4 | 0 | 6 | 0 |
| 42 | (Western Australia) | Kyal Horsley | 182 | 88 | 2 September 1987 | 25 | 2012 | Subiaco Lions | 13 | 3 | 13 | 3 |
| 46 | (Queensland) | Josh Hall | 197 | 84 | 3 April 1990 | 22 | 2012 | Curra Swans | 2 | 2 | 2 | 2 |
| 51 | (Victoria (state)) | Andrew McQualter | 179 | 74 | 9 June 1986 | 26 | 2005 | Gippsland Power | 5 | 2 | 94 | 39 |

== Pre-season results ==
=== NAB Cup ===
2012 pre-season games: 1–4 (Home: 1–2; Away: 0–2)
| Game | Date | Team | Score | Most Goals | Most Disposals | Venue; Attendance | Record |
| 1 | 25 February | Melbourne | W 26-23 | (-) | (-) | Metricon Stadium; 5,150 | 1–0 |
| 2 | 25 February | Brisbane | L 16-18 | (-) | (-) | Metricon Stadium; 5,150 | 1–1 |
| 3 | 2 March | Geelong | L 69-118 | (-) | (-) | Metricon Stadium; 5,381 | 1–2 |
| 4 | 10 March | Greater Western Sydney | L 63-76 | (-) | (-) | Lavington Sports Ground; 6,740 | 1–3 |
| 5 | 17 March | Sydney | L 84-103 | (-) | (-) | Blacktown Olympic Park; 741 | 1–4 |

== Home and Away season ==
=== Results summary ===
| Overall | | | | | | | | Home | | | Away | | |
| Pld | W | D | L | PF | PA | % | Pts | W | D | L | W | D | L |
|---|---|---|---|---|---|---|---|---|---|---|---|---|---|
| 22 | 3 | 0 | 19 | 1509 | 2481 | 60.8 | 12 | 2 | 0 | 9 | 1 | 0 | 10 |

=== Home and Away games ===
2012 home and away games: 3–19 (Home: 2–9; Away: 1–10)
| Round | Date | Team | Score | Most Goals | Most Disposals | Venue; Attendance | Record |
| 1 | 31 March | Adelaide | L 68-137 | Gary Ablett Jr (2); Campbell Brown (2); Harley Bennell (2) | Gary Ablett Jr (42) | Metricon Stadium; 12,790 | 0–1 |
| 2 | 8 April | St Kilda | L 47-139 | Gary Ablett Jr (2); Campbell Brown (2) | Gary Ablett Jr (40) | Etihad Stadium; 21,078 | 0–2 |
| 3 | 14 April | Essendon | L 88-105 | Gary Ablett Jr (2); Nathan Bock (2); Aaron Hall (2) | Gary Ablett Jr (45) | Metricon Stadium; 17,069 | 0–3 |
| 4 | 21 April | Brisbane | L 46-111 | Harley Bennell (3) | Gary Ablett Jr (33) | Gabba; 21,980 | 0–4 |
| 5 | 28 April | North Melbourne | L 93-127 | Harley Bennell (2) | Jared Brennan (24) | Etihad Stadium; 17,680 | 0–5 |
| 6 | 5 May | Fremantle | L 87-94 | Harley Bennell (3); David Swallow (3) | Harley Bennell (37) | Metricon Stadium; 11,670 | 0–6 |
| 7 | 12 May | Greater Western Sydney | L 67-94 | Sam Day (2); Josh Caddy (2) | Gary Ablett Jr (33) | Manuka Oval, Canberra; 8,603 | 0–7 |
| 8 | 19 May | Western Bulldogs | L 34-72 | Harley Bennell (1); Tom Lynch (1); Zac Smith (1); Dion Prestia (1) | Gary Ablett Jr (29) | TIO Stadium; 8,724 | 0–8 |
| 9 | 26 May | Port Adelaide | L 70-118 | Sam Day (3) | Harley Bennell (25); Gary Ablett Jr (25); Danny Stanley (25); S. Iles(25) | Metricon Stadium; 12,416 | 0–9 |
| 10 | 3 June | Collingwood | L 52-149 | Campbell Brown (3) | Gary Ablett Jr (53) | MCG; 36,913 | 0–10 |
| 11 | 9 June | St Kilda | L 49-144 | Tom Hickey (2); Jared Brennan (2) | S. Iles(27) | Metricon Stadium; 12,534 | 0–11 |
| 12 | 16 June | North Melbourne | L 80-87 | Gary Ablett Jr (4) | Gary Ablett Jr (42) | Metricon Stadium; 10,170 | 0–12 |
| 13 | Bye |
| 14 | 30 June | West Coast | L 40-166 | Gary Ablett Jr (1); Harley Bennell (1); Matthew Shaw (1); Liam Patrick (1) | Danny Stanley (30) | Patersons Stadium; 34,592 | 0–13 |
| 15 | 8 July | Geelong | L 96-110 | Josh Caddy (3) | Gary Ablett Jr (27) | Metricon Stadium; 15,824 | 0–14 |
| 16 | 14 July | Richmond | W 90-88 | Josh Hall (2); Brandon Matera (2); Karmichael Hunt (2) | Gary Ablett Jr (33) | Cazaly's Stadium| 10,961 | 1–14 |
| 17 | 21 July | Brisbane Lions | L 48-59 | Jared Brennan (1); Gary Ablett Jr (1); Tom Lynch (1); Harley Bennell (1) | Gary Ablett Jr (37) | Metricon Stadium; 16,550 | 1–15 |
| 18 | 28 July | Sydney | L 54-126 | Brandon Matera (3) | Gary Ablett Jr (42) | Metricon Stadium; 11,169 | 1–16 |
| 19 | 5 August | Melbourne | L 66-108 | Harley Bennell (4) | Harley Bennell (38) | MCG; 18,097 | 1–17 |
| 20 | 11 August | Greater Western Sydney | W 109-79 | Aaron Hall(3); Campbell Brown (3); Gary Ablett Jr (3) | Danny Stanley (26) | Metricon Stadium; 14,657 | 2–17 |
| 21 | 19 August | Hawthorn | L 65-129 | Steven May (3) | Gary Ablett Jr (43) | MCG; 23,098 | 2–18 |
| 22 | 25 August | Carlton | W 98-86 | Tom Lynch (4) | Gary Ablett Jr (23) | Metricon Stadium; 15,251 | 3–18 |
| 23 | 1 September | Adelaide | L 62-153 | Gary Ablett Jr (2); Steven May (2) | Gary Ablett Jr (26) | AAMI Stadium; 35,463 | 3–19 |

== Ladder ==
2012 AFL ladder
| Pos | Team | Pld | W | L | D | PF | PA | PP | Pts | |
|---|---|---|---|---|---|---|---|---|---|---|
| 1 | Hawthorn | 22 | 17 | 5 | 0 | 2679 | 1733 | 154.6 | 68 | Finals series |
| 2 | Adelaide | 22 | 17 | 5 | 0 | 2428 | 1833 | 132.5 | 68 | Finals series |
| 3 | Sydney (P) | 22 | 16 | 6 | 0 | 2290 | 1629 | 140.6 | 64 | Finals series |
| 4 | Collingwood | 22 | 16 | 6 | 0 | 2123 | 1823 | 116.5 | 64 | Finals series |
| 5 | West Coast | 22 | 15 | 7 | 0 | 2244 | 1807 | 124.2 | 60 | Finals series |
| 6 | Geelong | 22 | 15 | 7 | 0 | 2209 | 1886 | 117.1 | 60 | Finals series |
| 7 | Fremantle | 22 | 14 | 8 | 0 | 1956 | 1691 | 115.7 | 56 | Finals series |
| 8 | North Melbourne | 22 | 14 | 8 | 0 | 2359 | 2097 | 112.5 | 56 | Finals series |
| 9 | St Kilda | 22 | 12 | 10 | 0 | 2347 | 1903 | 123.3 | 48 | |
| 10 | Carlton | 22 | 11 | 11 | 0 | 2079 | 1925 | 108.0 | 44 | |
| 11 | Essendon | 22 | 11 | 11 | 0 | 2091 | 2090 | 100.0 | 44 | |
| 12 | Richmond | 22 | 10 | 11 | 1 | 2169 | 1943 | 111.6 | 42 | |
| 13 | Brisbane Lions | 22 | 10 | 12 | 0 | 1904 | 2092 | 91.0 | 40 | |
| 14 | Port Adelaide | 22 | 5 | 16 | 1 | 1691 | 2144 | 78.9 | 22 | |
| 15 | Western Bulldogs | 22 | 5 | 17 | 0 | 1542 | 2301 | 67.0 | 20 | |
| 16 | Melbourne | 22 | 4 | 18 | 0 | 1580 | 2341 | 67.5 | 16 | |
| 17 | Gold Coast | 22 | 3 | 19 | 0 | 1509 | 2481 | 60.8 | 12 | |
| 18 | Greater Western Sydney | 22 | 2 | 20 | 0 | 1270 | 2751 | 46.2 | 8 | |

Rules for classification: 1) points; 2) percentage; 3) number of points for.
(P) Premiers

=== Ladder Progress ===
| Round | 1 | 2 | 3 | 4 | 5 | 6 | 7 | 8 | 9 | 10 | 11 | 12 | 13 | 14 | 15 | 16 | 17 | 18 | 19 | 20 | 21 | 22 | 23 |
|---|---|---|---|---|---|---|---|---|---|---|---|---|---|---|---|---|---|---|---|---|---|---|---|
| Ground | H | A | H | A | A | H | A | A | H | A | H | H | B | A | H | A | H | H | A | H | A | H | A |
| Result | L | L | L | L | L | L | L | L | L | L | L | L | - | L | L | W | L | L | L | W | L | W | L |
| Position | 17 | 17 | 16 | 17 | 17 | 16 | 17 | 17 | 17 | 18 | 18 | 18 | 18 | 18 | 18 | 17 | 17 | 17 | 18 | 17 | 17 | 17 | 17 |

Source: Competitive Matches
A = Away; H = Home; B = Bye; W = Win; D = Draw; L = Lose

== Awards ==
=== Brownlow Medal ===
| Votes | Player |
|---|---|
| 24 | Gary Ablett Jr |
| 6 | Harley Bennell |
| 3 | Tom Lynch |
| 3 | Brandon Matera |
| 2 | Luke Russell |
| 1 | Steven May |
| 1 | Aaron Hall |
| 1 | Matt Shaw |
| 1 | Sam Iles |
| 1 | David Swallow |

=== Gold Coast Club Champion ===
| Votes | Player |
|---|---|
| 215 | Gary Ablett Jr |
| 163 | Harley Bennell |
| 84 | Danny Stanley |

=== Other Awards ===
| Award Name | Player |
|---|---|
| Ironman Award | Kyal Horsley |
| Community Award | Jarrod Harbrow |
| Most Professional | Kyal Horsley |
| Most Improved | Harley Bennell |
| Reserves Best | Alik Magin |

== NEAFL season ==
=== Results ===
| **Round** | **Date and local time** | **Opponent** | **Scores** (Gold Coast's scores indicated in **bold**) | | | **Venue** | **Ladder** **position** |
| **Round** | **Date and local time** | **Opponent** | Home | Away | Result | **Venue** | **Ladder** **position** |
| 1 | Bye | | | | | | 9th |
| 2 | Saturday, 31 March (10:30 am) | Southport | 10.5 (65) | **19.17 (131)** | Won by 66 points | Fankhauser Reserve **[A]** | 6th |

Gold Coast's NEAFL finals matches
| Week | Date and local time | Opponent | Scores (Gold Coast's scores indicated in bold) | | | Venue |
| Week | Date and local time | Opponent | Home | Away | Result | Venue |
|---|---|---|---|---|---|---|
| EF | Sunday, 26 August (1:30 pm) | Redland | 22.14 (146) | **6.11 (47)** | Lost by 99 points | Victoria Point **[A]** |

=== Ladder ===
2012 NEAFL Northern Conference Ladder
| Pos | Team | Pld | W | L | D | PF | PA | PP | Pts |
|---|---|---|---|---|---|---|---|---|---|
| 1 | NT Thunder | 18 | 15 | 3 | 0 | 2067 | 1391 | 148.6 | 60 |
| 2 | Brisbane (C, P) | 18 | 14 | 4 | 0 | 2335 | 1329 | 175.7 | 56 |
| 3 | Southport | 18 | 14 | 4 | 0 | 1978 | 1329 | 148.8 | 56 |
| 4 | Redland | 18 | 11 | 6 | 1 | 1888 | 1898 | 99.5 | 46 |
| **5** | Gold Coast | **18** | **9** | **9** | **0** | **1687** | **1525** | **110.6** | 36 |
| 6 | Labrador | 18 | 9 | 9 | 0 | 1637 | 1747 | 93.7 | 36 |
| 7 | Broadbeach | 18 | 8 | 9 | 1 | 1776 | 1823 | 97.4 | 34 |
| 8 | Mount Gravatt | 18 | 5 | 13 | 0 | 1477 | 2157 | 68.5 | 20 |
| 9 | Aspley | 18 | 4 | 14 | 0 | 1711 | 2028 | 84.4 | 16 |
| 10 | Morningside | 18 | 3 | 15 | 0 | 1578 | 2288 | 69.0 | 12 |

Source: www.neafl.com.au
Rules for classification: 1) points; 2) percentage; 3) number of points for.
(C) Conference Premiers; (P) Premiers
