= 2011 Gold Coast Suns season =

Coordinates: 28°00′23″S 153°22′2″E

Gold Coast Suns
2011 season
- President: John Witheriff
- Coach: Guy McKenna
- Captain: Gary Ablett, Jr.
- Home ground: Metricon Stadium
- NAB Cup: Qualifying finals
- AFL season: 17th (Wooden Spoon)
- Best and Fairest: Gary Ablett, Jr.
- Leading goalkicker: Danny Stanley (20 goals)
- Highest home attendance: 27,914

The 2011 AFL season was the Gold Coast Suns' first season in the Australian Football League (AFL). The Gold Coast Suns reserves team also competed in the inaugural NEAFL season.

== Draft picks ==
Round	Pick	Player	State/Nationality	Recruited From	League
1	1	David Swallow	Western Australia	East Fremantle Sharks	WAFL
1	2	Harley Bennell	Western Australia	Peel Thunder	WAFL
1	3	Sam Day	South Australia	Sturt Double Blues	SANFL
1	7	Josh Caddy	(Victoria (state)) Victoria	Northern Knights	TAC Cup
1	9	Dion Prestia	(Victoria (state)) Victoria	Calder Cannons	TAC Cup
1	10	Daniel Gorringe	South Australia	Norwood Redlegs	SANFL
1	11	Tom Lynch	(Victoria (state)) Victoria	Dandenong Stingrays	TAC Cup
1	13	Seb Tape	South Australia	Glenelg Tigers	SANFL
2	39	Jeremy Taylor	(Victoria (state)) Victoria	Geelong Falcons	TAC Cup
3	49	Jacob Gilbee	Tasmania	Lauderdale Bombers	TFL
Pre-season Draft
1	1	Nathan Ablett	(Victoria (state)) Victoria	Broadbeach Cats	QAFL
Rookie Draft
1	9	Joel Tippett	Queensland	Brisbane Lions	AFL
6	82	Jake Crawford	Queensland	Southport Sharks	QAFL

== Transactions ==
=== Overview ===
Players Added

Via trade
-
Via free agency

- Gary Ablett Jr
- Nathan Bock
- Jared Brennan
- Campbell Brown
- Josh Fraser
- Jarrod Harbrow
- Nathan Krakouer
- Michael Rischitelli
Players Lost

Via trade
-
Via free agency
-

=== Trades ===
7 October 2010

To Fremantle Dockers
- Peter Faulks
- No. 61 Pick
To Gold Coast Suns
- No. 55 Pick
7 October 2010

To Collingwood Magpies
- Andrew Krakouer
- John Ceglar
- No. 55 Pick
- No. 78 Pick
- No. 95 Pick
To Gold Coast Suns
- No. 25 Pick
8 October 2010

To Brisbane Lions
- Rohan Bewick
- No. 5 Pick
- No. 25 Pick
- No. 27 Pick
To Gold Coast Suns
- 1st Round Compensation Pick
- No. 10 Pick
- No. 48 Pick
10 October 2010

To Fremantle Dockers
- Tendai Mzungu
- No. 44 Pick
To Gold Coast Suns
- No. 38 Pick
11 October 2010

To North Melbourne Kangaroos
- Cameron Richardson
To Gold Coast Suns
- No. 35 Pick
11 October 2010

To Port Adelaide Power
- Simon Phillips
- No. 35 Pick
To Gold Coast Suns
- 2nd Round Compensation Pick
11 October 2010

To Geelong Cats
- No. 15 Pick
To Gold Coast Suns
- 1st Round Compensation Pick

=== Free Agents ===
==== Additions ====
Player	Signed	Former Team
Nathan Bock	Signed 3 Year Contract	Adelaide Crows
Nathan Krakouer	Signed 3 Year Contract	Port Adelaide Power
Michael Rischitelli	Signed 3 Year Contract	Brisbane Lions
Campbell Brown	Signed 3 Year Contract	Hawthorn Hawks
Jarrod Harbrow	Signed 3 Year Contract	Western Bulldogs
Gary Ablett Jr	Signed 5 Year Contract	Geelong Cats
Josh Fraser	Signed 2 Year Contract	Collingwood Magpies
Jared Brennan	Signed 3 Year Contract	Brisbane Lions

== 2011 playing list ==
Senior list
No.	Born	Player	Hgt	Wgt	Date of birth	Age in 2011	Debut	Recruited from	2011 Games	2011 Goals	Career Games	Career Goals
1	(Victoria (state))	Marc Lock	192	83	21 June 1991	20	2011	Labrador Tigers	1	0	1	0
2	(Queensland)	Zac Smith	205	97	22 February 1990	21	2011	Southport Sharks	14	10	14	10
3	(Northern Territory)	Jared Brennan	195	95	28 July 1984	27	2003	Brisbane Lions	15	10	134	85
4	(Tasmania)	Maverick Weller	182	79	13 February 1992	19	2011	Burnie Dockers	8	1	8	1
5	(Queensland)	Jarrod Harbrow	178	74	18 July 1988	23	2007	Western Bulldogs	15	0	85	21
7	(Queensland)	Karmichael Hunt	186	92	17 November 1986	25	2011	N/A	12	1	12	1
8	(Tasmania)	Luke Russell	186	78	24 January 1992	19	2011	Burnie Dockers	8	2	8	2
9	(Victoria (state))	Gary Ablett, Jr.	182	85	14 May 1984	27	2002	Geelong Cats	14	15	206	277
10	(Queensland)	Lewis Moss	195	80	4 February 1992	19	****	Port Douglas AFC	0	0	0	0
12	(Queensland)	Jack Stanlake	191	79	28 February 1991	20	****	Southport Sharks	0	0	0	0
13	(South Australia)	Hayden Jolly	184	83	4 April 1992	19	2011	Glenelg Tigers	4	0	4	0
14	(Western Australia)	Nathan Krakouer	182	78	5 May 1988	23	2007	Port Adelaide Power	9	7	49	14
15	(Victoria (state))	Piers Flanagan	189	74	31 March 1992	19	****	Geelong Falcons	0	0	0	0
16	(Queensland)	Rory Thompson	200	91	12 March 1991	20	2011	Southport Sharks	2	0	2	0
17	(Victoria (state))	Josh Fraser	202	100	5 January 1982	29	2000	Collingwood Magpies	10	8	210	164
18	(Victoria (state))	Trent McKenzie	191	82	3 April 1992	19	2011	Western Jets	14	8	14	8
19	(Queensland)	Joseph Daye	195	85	2 February 1990	21	2011	Southport Sharks	2	1	2	1
20	(Victoria (state))	Josh Toy	185	87	18 April 1992	19	2011	Calder Cannons	6	1	6	1
21	(Victoria (state))	Daniel Harris	180	82	10 May 1982	29	2001	North Melbourne Kangaroos	10	2	159	46
22	(Victoria (state))	Tom Nicholls	201	93	4 March 1992	19	2011	Sandringham Dragons	1	0	1	0
23	(Queensland)	Charlie Dixon	202	107	23 September 1990	21	2011	Redland Bombers	9	6	9	6
24	(Western Australia)	David Swallow	186	83	19 November 1992	19	2011	East Fremantle Sharks	14	9	14	9
25	(Victoria (state))	Daniel Stanley	187	88	18 February 1988	23	2007	Collingwood Magpies	15	13	20	13
26	(Victoria (state))	Matt Shaw	187	71	5 February 1992	19	2011	Dandenong Stingrays	9	3	9	3
27	(South Australia)	Michael Coad	190	86	13 September 1983	28	****	Sturt Blues	0	0	0	0
29	(Victoria (state))	Taylor Hine	184	75	24 January 1992	19	2011	Calder Cannons	1	0	1	0
30	(Western Australia)	Campbell Brown	179	81.5	28 August 1983	28	2002	Hawthorn Hawks	11	0	170	64
32	(Western Australia)	Brandon Matera	175	65	11 March 1992	19	2011	South Fremantle Bulldogs	10	12	10	12
33	(Queensland)	Rex Liddy	185	86	2 January 1992	19	2011	Kenmore Bears	3	0	3	0
34	(Victoria (state))	Jack Hutchins	191	92	20 February 1992	19	2011	Sandringham Dragons	6	0	6	0
35	(Victoria (state))	Michael Rischitelli	184	81.6	8 January 1986	25	2004	Brisbane Lions	14	5	125	52
36	(Tasmania)	Sam Iles	185	83	19 June 1985	26	2006	Box Hill Hawks	12	7	19	7
37	(Western Australia)	Harley Bennell	185	74	2 October 1992	19	2011	Peel Thunder	7	3	7	3
38	(Queensland)	Joel Wilkinson	186	81	29 November 1991	20	2011	Broadbeach Cats	4	1	4	1
39	(South Australia)	Sam Day	196	96	6 September 1992	19	2011	Sturt Blues	7	2	7	2
40	(Queensland)	Tom Hickey	201.4	87.4	6 March 1991	20	****	Morningside Panthers	0	0	0	0
41	(Victoria (state))	Dion Prestia	175	82	12 October 1992	19	2011	Calder Cannons	11	1	11	1
42	(Victoria (state))	Josh Caddy	186	82	28 September 1992	19	****	Northern Knights	0	0	0	0
43	(Northern Territory)	Liam Patrick	189	71.9	4 March 1988	23	2011	Wanderers Eagles	12	2	12	2
44	(South Australia)	Nathan Bock	193	93	20 March 1983	28	2004	Adelaide Crows	14	1	127	58
45	(Northern Territory)	Steven May	190	93	10 January 1992	19	2011	Melbourne Grammar School	5	0	5	0
46	(Victoria (state))	Thomas Lynch	199	91	31 October 1992	19	2011	Dandenong Stingrays	9	14	9	14
47	(South Australia)	Daniel Gorringe	200	88	2 June 1992	19	2011	Norwood Redlegs	7	2	7	2
48	(Victoria (state))	Seb Tape	191	81	6 August 1992	19	2011	Glenelg Tigers	9	0	9	0
49	(Tasmania)	Jacob Gillbee	184	76	13 September 1992	19	****	Lauderdale Bombers	0	0	0	0
50	(Victoria (state))	Jeremy Taylor	191	83	17 June 1992	19	****	Geelong Falcons	0	0	0	0
55	(Victoria (state))	Nathan Ablett	194	96	13 December 1985	26	2005	Geelong Football Club	0	0	32	46
Rookie list
No.	Born	Player	Hgt	Wgt	Date of birth	Age in 2011	Debut	Recruited from	2011 Games	2011 Goals	Career Games	Career Goals
6	(Queensland)	Alik Magin	181	72	13 April 1991	20	2011	Labrador Tigers	3	1	3	1
28	(Northern Territory)	Roland Ah Chee	181	79	21 November 1990	21	****	Norwood Redlegs	0	0	0	0
31	(Queensland)	Jack Stanley	192	87	3 January 1990	21	****	Zillmere Eagles	0	0	0	0
51	(Queensland)	Jake Crawford	190	89	5 March 1992	19	****	Southport Sharks	0	0	0	0
52	(Victoria (state))	Joel Tippett	197	91	26 October 1988	23	****	Brisbane Lions	0	0	0	0

== Pre-season results ==
=== NAB Cup ===
2011 pre-season games: 2-1 (Home: 0-0; Away: 2–1)
Game	Date	Team	Score	Most Goals	Most Disposals	Venue; Attendance	Record
1	19 February	Sydney	W 25-22	(-)	(-)	Blacktown Olympic Park; 10,000	1–0
2	19 February	Greater Western Sydney	W 52-27	(-)	(-)	Blacktown Olympic Park; 9,947	2–0
3	27 February	West Coast	L 50-87	(-)	(-)	Subiaco Oval; 12,625	2–1
4	5 March	Sydney	L 23-95	(-)	(-)	Fankhauser Reserve; 2,859	2–2
5	13 March	Brisbane	L 54-122	(-)	(-)	Fankhauser Reserve; 4,053	2–3

== Home and Away season ==
=== Results summary ===
Overall								Home			Away		
Pld	W	D	L	PF	PA	%	Pts	W	D	L	W	D	L
22	3	0	19	1534	2726	56.27	12	1	0	10	2	0	9

=== Home and Away games ===
2011 home and away games: 3-19 (Home: 1–10; Away: 2–9)
Round	Date	Team	Score	Most Goals	Most Disposals	Venue; Attendance	Record
1	Bye
2	2 April	Carlton	L 52-171	Charlie Dixon (2)	Michael Rischitelli (31)	Gabba; 27,914	0–1
3	9 April	Western Bulldogs	L 51-122	Danny Stanley (2)	Gary Ablett Jr (34)	Etihad Stadium; 21,373	0–2
4	17 April	Melbourne	L 69-159	Zac Smith (2); David Swallow (2)	Michael Rischitelli (24)	Gabba; 12,111	0–3
5	23 April	Port Adelaide	W 104-101	Zac Smith (2); David Swallow (2)	Michael Rischitelli (31)	AAMI Stadium; 21,287	1–3
6	1 May	Essendon	L 58-197	Sam Iles (2); Brandon Matera (2)	Gary Ablett Jr (30)	Etihad Stadium; 33,710	1–4
7	7 May	Brisbane	W 124-116	Nathan Krakouer (5)	Jared Brennan (30)	Gabba; 25,501	2–4
8	14 May	Adelaide	L 73-130	Gary Ablett Jr (4)	Gary Ablett Jr (41)	AAMI Stadium; 36,056	2–5
9	Bye
10	28 May	Geelong	L 73-139	Nathan Krakouer (2); Zac Smith (2)	Gary Ablett Jr (31)	Metricon Stadium; 21,485	2–6
11	4 June	West Coast	L 67-85	Gary Ablett Jr (2); Tom Lynch (2)	Gary Ablett Jr (32)	Subiaco Oval; 36,815	2–7
12	11 June	North Melbourne	L 63-122	Gary Ablett Jr (2); Josh Fraser (2); Danny Stanley (2)	Gary Ablett Jr (38)	Metricon Stadium; 14,945	2–8
13	18 June	Hawthorn	L 58-129	Tom Lynch (3)	Gary Ablett Jr (34)	Aurora Stadium; 16,377	2–9
14	25 June	Western Bulldogs	L 88-110	Tom Lynch (3)	Michael Rischitelli (27)	Metricon Stadium; 16,149	2–10
15	2 July	Fremantle	L 62-112	Gary Ablett Jr (3)	Gary Ablett Jr (34)	Subiaco Oval; 28,646	2–11
16	9 July	Sydney	L 36-106	David Swallow (2)	Jarrod Harbrow (25)	Metricon Stadium; 16,488	2–12
17	16 July	Richmond	W 85-70	Jared Brennan (3); Danny Stanley (3)	Gary Ablett Jr (27)	Cazaly's Stadium; 10,382	3–12
18	23 July	Collingwood	L 75-129	Harley Bennell (2); Trent McKenzie (2)	Gary Ablett Jr (36)	Metricon Stadium; 23,302	3–13
19	30 July	St Kilda	L 54-74	Gary Ablett Jr (1); Jarrod Harbrow (1) etc.	Gary Ablett Jr (34)	Metricon Stadium; 17,482	3–14
20	6 August	Geelong	L 38-188	Harley Bennell (2); Danny Stanley (2)	Nathan Bock (27)	Skilled Stadium; 24,588	3–15
21	13 August	Brisbane	L 61-123	Michael Rischitelli (2); Matt Shaw (2)	Gary Ablett Jr (28)	Gabba; 23,565	3–16
22	20 August	Adelaide	L 64-125	Trent McKenzie (2); Matt Shaw (2)	Gary Ablett Jr (39)	Metricon Stadium; 16,168	3–17
23	28 August	Melbourne	L 82-112	Harley Bennell (2); Michael Rischitelli (2) etc.	Michael Rischitelli (30)	MCG; 21,534	3–18
24	3 September	Hawthorn	L 97-106	Brandon Matera (3)	Gary Ablett Jr (43)	Metricon Stadium; 19,314	3–19

== Ladder ==
2011 AFL ladder
Pos	Team	Pld	W	L	D	PF	PA	PP	Pts	
1	Collingwood	22	20	2	0	2592	1546	167.7	80	Finals series
2	Geelong (P)	22	19	3	0	2548	1619	157.4	76	Finals series
3	Hawthorn	22	18	4	0	2355	1634	144.1	72	Finals series
4	West Coast	22	17	5	0	2235	1715	130.3	68	Finals series
5	Carlton	22	14	7	1	2225	1700	130.9	58	Finals series
6	St Kilda	22	12	9	1	1891	1677	112.8	50	Finals series
7	Sydney	22	12	9	1	1897	1735	109.3	50	Finals series
8	Essendon	22	11	10	1	2217	2217	100.0	46	Finals series
9	North Melbourne	22	10	12	0	2106	2082	101.2	40	
10	Western Bulldogs	22	9	13	0	2060	2155	95.6	36	
11	Fremantle	22	9	13	0	1791	2155	83.1	36	
12	Richmond	22	8	13	1	2069	2396	86.4	34	
13	Melbourne	22	8	13	1	1974	2315	85.3	34	
14	Adelaide	22	7	15	0	1742	2193	79.4	28	
15	Brisbane Lions	22	4	18	0	1814	2240	81.0	16	
16	Port Adelaide	22	3	19	0	1718	2663	64.5	12	
17	Gold Coast	22	3	19	0	1534	2726	56.3	12	

Source: AFL ladder
Rules for classification: 1) points; 2) percentage; 3) number of points for.
(P) Premiers

=== Ladder Progress ===
Round	1	2	3	4	5	6	7	8	9	10	11	12	13	14	15	16	17	18	19	20	21	22	23	24
Ground	-	H	A	H	A	A	H	A	-	H	A	H	A	H	A	H	A	H	H	A	A	H	A	H
Result	B	L	L	L	W	L	W	L	B	L	L	L	L	L	L	L	W	L	L	L	L	L	L	L
Position	9	17	17	17	15	16	13	14	15	17	17	17	17	17	17	17	16	16	16	16	16	16	16	17

A = Away; H = Home; B = Bye; W = Win; D = Draw; L = Loss

(hits the dab)

== Awards ==
=== Brownlow Medal ===
Votes	Player
23	Gary Ablett Jr
3	Jared Brennan
3	Nathan Bock
2	David Swallow
2	Zac Smith
2	Michael Rischitelli
2	Brandon Matera

=== Gold Coast Club Champion ===
Votes	Player
-	Gary Ablett Jr
-	Nathan Bock

=== Other Awards ===
Award Name	Player
Ironman Award	Michael Rischitelli
Community Award	Alik Magin
Most Professional	Michael Rischitelli
Most Improved	Karmichael Hunt
Reserves Best	Jacob Gillbee

== Representative honours ==
=== International Rules ===
==== Australia ====
Player	Games
Trent McKenzie	2
Zac Smith	2

== NEAFL season ==
=== Results ===
**Round**	**Date and local time**	**Opponent**	**Scores** (Gold Coast's scores indicated in **bold**)			**Venue**	**Ladder** **position**
**Round**	**Date and local time**	**Opponent**	Home	Away	Result	**Venue**	**Ladder** **position**
1	Saturday, 2 April (12:30 pm)	Mount Gravatt	**10.11 (71)**	15.9 (99)	Lost by 28 points	H & A Oval **[H]**	-
2	Saturday, 9 April (7:00 pm)	Northern Territory	11.15 (81)	**11.6 (72)**	Lost by 9 points	TIO Stadium **[A]**	-
3	Saturday, 16 April (11:15 am)	Aspley	**16.16 (112)**	11.13 (79)	Won by 33 points	H & A Oval **[H]**	-
4	Saturday, 23 April (2:00 pm)	Labrador	9.4 (58)	**13.12 (90)**	Won by 32 points	Cooke-Murphy Reserve **[A]**	-
5	Saturday, 30 April (2:00 pm)	Mount Gravatt	11.8 (75)	**12.16 (88)**	Won by 13 points	Dittmer Park **[A]**	-
6	Saturday, 7 May (11:00 am)	Brisbane (res)	**17.18 (120)**	9.9 (63)	Won by 57 points	Fankhauser Reserve **[H]**	-
7	Saturday, 14 May (1:50 pm)	Sydney (res)	18.12 (120)	**3.10 (28)**	Lost by 9 points	Lakeside Oval **[A]**	-
8	Bye						-
9	Saturday, 28 May (1:15 pm)	Southport	**18.5 (113)**	11.11 (77)	Won by 56 points	Sir Bruce Small Park **[H]**	-
10	Saturday, 4 June (12:15 pm)	GWS	17.9 (111)	**11.8 (74)**	Lost by 37 points	Blacktown Olympic Park **[A]**	-
11	Saturday, 11 June (1:00 pm)	Morningside	**12.10 (82)**	12.8 (80)	Won by 2 points	H & A Oval **[H]**	-
12	Bye						-
13	Sunday, 26 June (3:15 pm)	Redland	11.15 (81)	**19.13 (127)**	Won by 46 points	Yeronga **[A]**	-
14	Saturday, 2 July (2:00 pm)	Southport	9.6 (60)	**24.11 (155)**	Won by 95 points	Fankhauser Reserve **[A]**	-
15	Saturday, 9 July (3:00 pm)	Sydney (res)	**21.15 (141)**	9.8 (62)	Won by 79 points	Carrara Stadium **[H]**	-
16	Saturday, 16 July (10:15 am)	Northern Territory	**10.10 (70)**	20.9 (129)	Lost by 59 points	Cazaly's Stadium **[H]**	-
17	Saturday, 23 July (3:25 pm)	Brisbane (res)	**18.10 (118)**	7.13 (55)	Won by 63 points	Carrara Stadium **[H]**	-
18	Bye						-
19	Saturday, 6 August (2:00 am)	Broadbeach	14.14 (98)	**12.8 (80)**	Lost by 16 points	H & A Oval **[A]**	-
20	Saturday, 13 August (2:00 am)	Brisbane (res)	11.17 (83)	**12.7 (79)**	Lost by 4 points	Coorparoo Oval **[A]**	-
21	Sunday, 20 August (10:10 am)	GWS	**22.17 (149)**	7.10 (52)	Won by 97 points	Carrara Stadium **[H]**	-
22	Bye						3rd

Gold Coast's NEAFL finals matches
Week	Date and local time	Opponent	Scores (Gold Coast's scores indicated in bold)			Venue
Week	Date and local time	Opponent	Home	Away	Result	Venue
QF	Sunday, 28 August (2:00 pm)	Mount Gravatt	26.12 (168)	**16.6 (102)**	Lost by 66 points	Victoria Point **[A]**
SF	Saturday, 3 September (9:10 pm)	Morningside	**7.10 (52)**	19.13 (127)	Lost by 75 points	Fankhauser Reserve **[H]**

=== Northern Conference ===
Pos	Team	Pld	W	L	D	PF	PA	PP	Pts
1	NT Thunder **(P)** **(C)**	18	14	4	0	2068	1436	144.0	56
2	Mount Gravatt	18	12	6	0	1804	1645	109.7	48
**3**	Gold Coast	**18**	**11**	**7**	**0**	**1752**	**1461**	**119.9**	44
4	Morningside	18	9	8	1	1641	1719	95.5	38
5	Aspley	18	9	9	0	1699	1625	104.6	36
6	Broadbeach	18	9	9	0	1595	1621	98.4	36
7	Southport	18	9	9	0	1538	1664	92.4	36
8	Redland	18	8	10	0	1740	1741	99.9	32
9	Labrador	18	5	13	0	1389	1783	77.9	20
10	Brisbane	18	4	13	1	1540	1864	82.6	18

Source: www.neafl.com.au
Rules for classification: 1) points; 2) percentage; 3) number of points for.
