= Wests Bulldogs =

Wests Bulldogs may refer to:

- Western Bulldogs, club in the Australian Football League
- Wests Rugby, club in the Queensland Premier Rugby competition
- Western Districts Australian Football Club, which used to compete in the AFL Queensland State League
