= Craig Potter =

Craig Potter may refer to:

- Craig Potter (Australian footballer) (born 1966), former VFL/AFL footballer from Queensland
- Craig Potter (footballer, born 1984), Scottish footballer playing for Dumbarton F.C.
- Craig Potter (musician), member of British band Elbow
