= Kenmore Australian Football Club =

Kenmore Bears

Names
- Full name: Kenmore Australian Football Club
- Nickname: Bears
- Club song: "Join in the chorus"

Club details
- Founded: 1997; 29 years ago
- Colours
- Competition: QAFL South
- President: Terry Mumford
- Coach: Justin Davies
- Ground: Main Oval, Chelmer, Queensland

Uniforms
Home

The Kenmore Australian Football Club, also known as the Kenmore Bears, is an Australian rules football club formed as an offshoot of an older junior club which is notable as having produced Australian Football League players Mal Michael and Courtenay Dempsey. Other Australian rules football players Max Hudghton, Jackson Allen, Peter Yagmoor and Rex Liddy spent a significant amount of their junior careers at Kenmore's junior club.

== History ==
=== Formation ===
The Kenmore Bears was formed in the 1997 season. The Club was originally formed to give players from the Kenmore Juniors AFC an opportunity to play senior football close to home. At that stage, the closest senior club, West Brisbane Australian Football Club, had folded after winning the 1996 Queensland Australia Football League (QAFL) Premiership.

In its first season, Kenmore fielded one side in the Division 3 competition in what was then the Brisbane Australian Football League (BAFL). They originally played out of the home of the Kenmore Juniors, at Akuna Oval in Kenmore. In their first season, Kenmore tasted success, winning the Premiership. This was followed quickly by another Premiership in 1998.

=== Promotion ===
In 1999, Kenmore were promoted to the 2nd Division of the BAFL. Playing in this division required the formation of two sides. It was Kenmore's hardest season since their formation, with both sides winning only a handful of games and finishing towards the bottom of the table.

=== Division 3 ===
In 2000, the BAFL merged with its Gold Coast equivalent to form the Australian Football League South Queensland (AFLSQ). Kenmore played in two losing Division 3 Grand Finals of the new competition in 2000 and 2001, before winning the premiership again in 2002. In 2001, the club changed home grounds to that of the Jindalee Jags which is in Wongaburra Street, Jindalee. After captaining Kenmore to consecutive losing Grand Finals, Jeff Williams handed over his captaincy to Anthony Randell. Williams remained with a club as a playing Assistant Coach in 2002, returning to coach the Seniors in 2005.

In 2002, the Club's administration looked for a bigger home ground, with the Jindalee base considered too small for Senior football. At this point the decision was made to move to a new home ground in Queenscroft Street, Chelmer. Incidentally, these clubrooms were the West Brisbane clubrooms when they folded.

=== Promoted Again ===
In 2003, Kenmore were promoted into the Division 2 competition. This was a tough year for the club, but also an important year for its development. The Seniors finished the year without a win and on the bottom of the table. However, future premiership captain Peter Stowasser played his first year for the club this season. In a stark contrast, the Reserves side, captained by Brett "Billy" Stevens, won the Premiership. The side included many players still playing junior football, such as Tim Plummer, Greg Stirling and Brendan Stirling. Bolstered by ageing yet quality inclusions such as Cameron Bulley (who captained the 1996 West Brisbane Premiership), Brad Lennon and Peter Halverson, the side overcame Wynnum in the Grand Final.

The following season in 2004 Kenmore registered its first win in the Seniors, defeating Glasshouse by 55 points at home. Captained now by Peter Stowasser, the side quickly followed its win with another over Griffith University by 6 points. However, wins were still uncommon, both sides registering 6 wins each for the season. Importantly for the Seniors though, they registered their first win over a finals side, defeating eventual runners-up Ipswich away in Round 9. As a sign of the club's growth, 6 future Premiership players made their Seniors debut that season: Simeon Bell, Ian Maughan, James May, Will Nase, Nick Routledge and Cameron Stirling (who was then only 15). Ashley Bone, Scott Matthews, Peter Stowasser and the other three Stirling brothers, Andrew, Greg and Brendan, were the other the 6 players to play Seniors that year and later in the 2006 Premiership.

2005 was a year of ever improving fortunes for Kenmore. Coached by Jeff Williams, who returned to the club after playing his last game in 2002, the Seniors made their first finals series (finishing fourth). They defeated Logan in the first week in a spiteful clash that lead to several reports, all but one on Logan players. They then faced Moorooka in the semi-final, defeating them comfortably, before losing narrowly to an Ipswich side strengthened by the late inclusion of eventual AFL player Rhan Hooper. The Reserves also made the finals, competing in the semi-final which they lost. With finals experience and a core group of players committed to the following season, Kenmore were well placed to capitalise on the hard work of previous years. Another 6 future premiership players joined the team in 2005: Nick Dunn, Trent Fuller, Adrian Murphy, Tristan Shaw, Michael Nixon and Robert Sullivan.

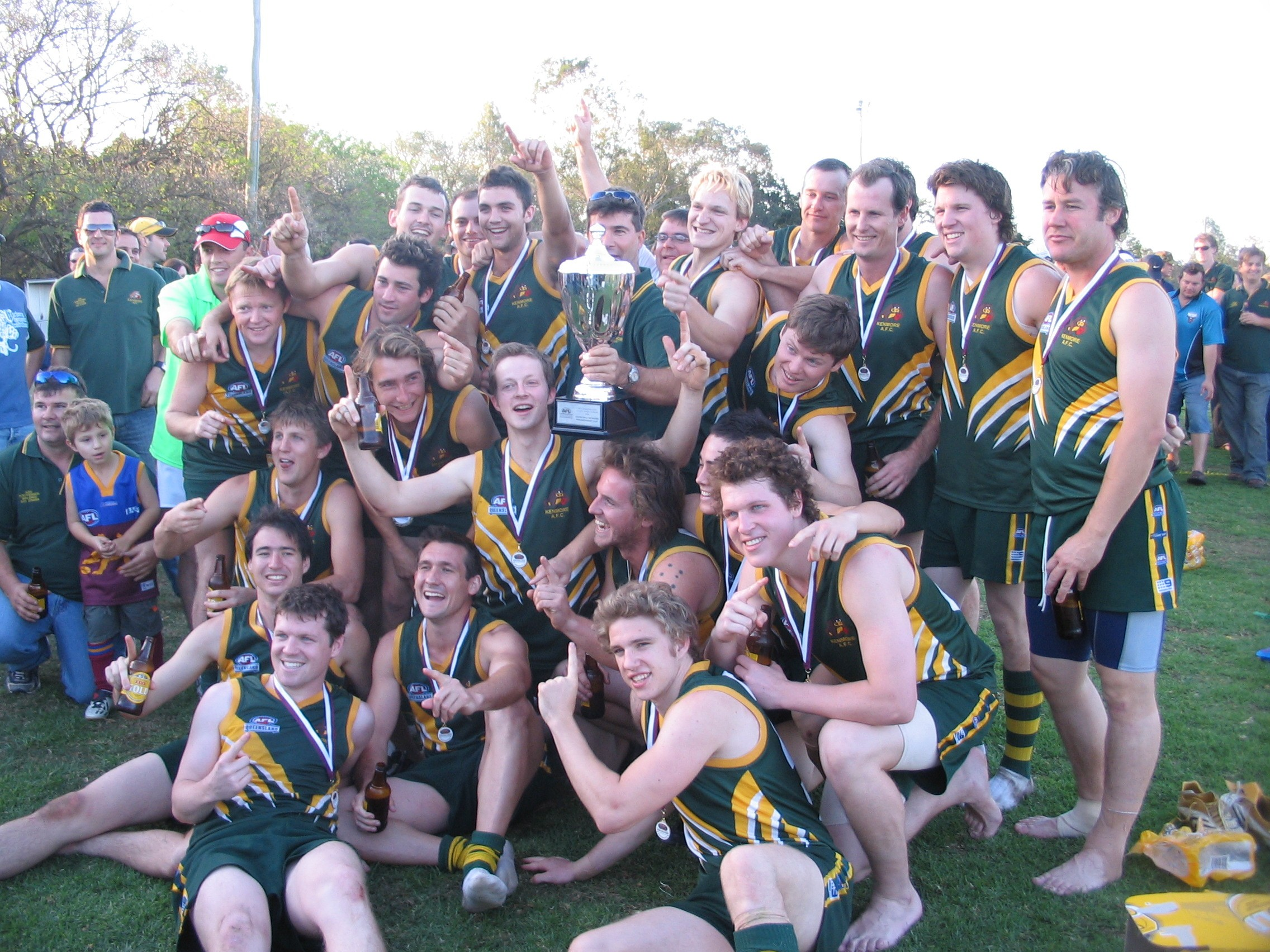
The 2006 GF premiership team

Before the 2006 season, AFSLQ merged with the Australian Football League of Queensland (AFLQ). As a result, Kenmore moved into the AFLQ State Association Division 2. In 2006, Kenmore's 10th season, Jeff Williams coached and Peter Stowasser captained the first undefeated premiership side Kenmore had. The inclusion of Dean Jennings, Wayne Patterson and Tom Cook into the side was invaluable, Cook particularly so given his Best on Ground performance in the Grand Final. However, it was the inclusion of star forward Shayne Etherton that really had the side firing. Etherton took Kenmore's record for most goals in a game (14 versus Calamvale away in Round 4) and ended the home and away season with a staggering 100 goals exactly. Kenmore rarely looked threatened during the season and eventually won the Grand Final by a huge 77 points, defeating a lacklustre Logan City. The Reserves had another successful season, making the finals, but again losing in the second week to eventual Grand Finalists Logan City.

=== Division 1 ===
In 2007 Kenmore was promoted once again after the most successful year at the club into the AFLQ State Association Division 1.

In 2008 Kenmore again entered an U18 side back in the competition winning the Premiership.

During 2009 and 2010 the KAFC the seniors and reserves landed on some tough times that did not see as many wins as they would have liked as a number of experienced players moved on to clubs in higher divisions.

For the 2011 season, it was a name linked to the closest rival that came over to coach the football club and turn around the fortunes on the field. Tom Corless provided direction on the field and was able to guide the club to some important wins in the competition again. The Reserves were back playing finals football under new coach James Dobson. During 2011 U18 side coached by John Baldwin, won the Premiership after a season which saw a number of the younger Bears playing both Senior football and U18 football most weekends.

The 2012 season saw improvements for the Seniors team, which finished third before losing the preliminary final. A number of players progressed from the Juniors and had developed over the previous few seasons. The U18 team reached the Grand Final, following two seasons in which a group of players from Jindalee and Kenmore had played together.

In 2013 Kenmore did not have enough younger players to enter an U18 side, so we changed course and entered a Third side in the Division 4 competition which allowed the younger players to still play football with their mates. It was a learning experiment but added a new edge to the football club mixing youth and experience. Meanwhile, the Reserves were able to play some good football before losing the Preliminary final.

=== North & South ===
In 2014, AFLQ decided to realign the competitions again to try and limit travel. Kenmore is now playing in the QFA Southern Conference travelling from Coolangatta to Brisbane. 2014 saw a number of changes with new coaches taking up positions at the club, including Senior Coach, William Fozard and Assistant Coach, Anthony Corrie. It was a highly successful year on the field, with the Seniors losing the Preliminary final, and the Reserves losing the Elimination final.

=== Further Promotion ===
Following Kenmore's onfield success in the 2006 season, the Committee resolved to seek promotion to Division One of the AFLQ State Association. In January 2007, it was confirmed that Kenmore had been promoted to the higher level. The 2007 season was a year of rebuilding and adjusting to the increase in pace and skill of the higher division for the newly promoted Bears. The Senior side managed 7 wins for the season, beating 6 of their 9 competitors and ultimately finishing in 8th place. The Reserves side also managed a number of victories for the year and finished in 9th place.

=== Ground Concerns ===
Mid-way through the 2007 season, Kenmore's home ground at Chelmer was condemned by AFLQ due to its hardness. Penetrometer testing on the ground indicated that it was two times harder than the acceptable limit allowed by AFLQ. As a result, Kenmore were forced to train at the Kenmore Junior Football Club and had their home matches changed to away matches.

Some remedial work was undertaken on the ground, which allowed Kenmore to return briefly to their home ground towards the end of the 2007 season. However, it was apparent that the ground's problems were far more significant than initially thought when deep holes began to appear in the pockets at each end. Kenmore, once again had to play their matches elsewhere.

After considerable media attention highlighting the ground's disrepair, the Brisbane City Council announced plans for a $700,000 rejuvenation of the once great oval. As a result, the Bears did not have access to the ground for the 2008 season, resulting in home matches being played on the grounds of the Western Magpies which are adjacent to Kenmore's.

The work was completed after the end of the 2008 season, and the Bears successfully returned to their home ground.

=== Application to the AFL for the 17th AFL Licence ===
In December 2007, the Kenmore Bears became the first club in Australia to apply to the Australian Football League for the purported 17th AFL Licence on the Gold Coast. The detailed application can be viewed on the AFLQ website. The Bears' application attracted considerable attention in footballing circles as the concept of an amateur club participating on the nation's greatest footballing stage was debated. The Bears did not receive a response from the AFL, and were disappointed when the GC17 Consortium's bid for the licence was announced as being successful.

== League Award Winners ==
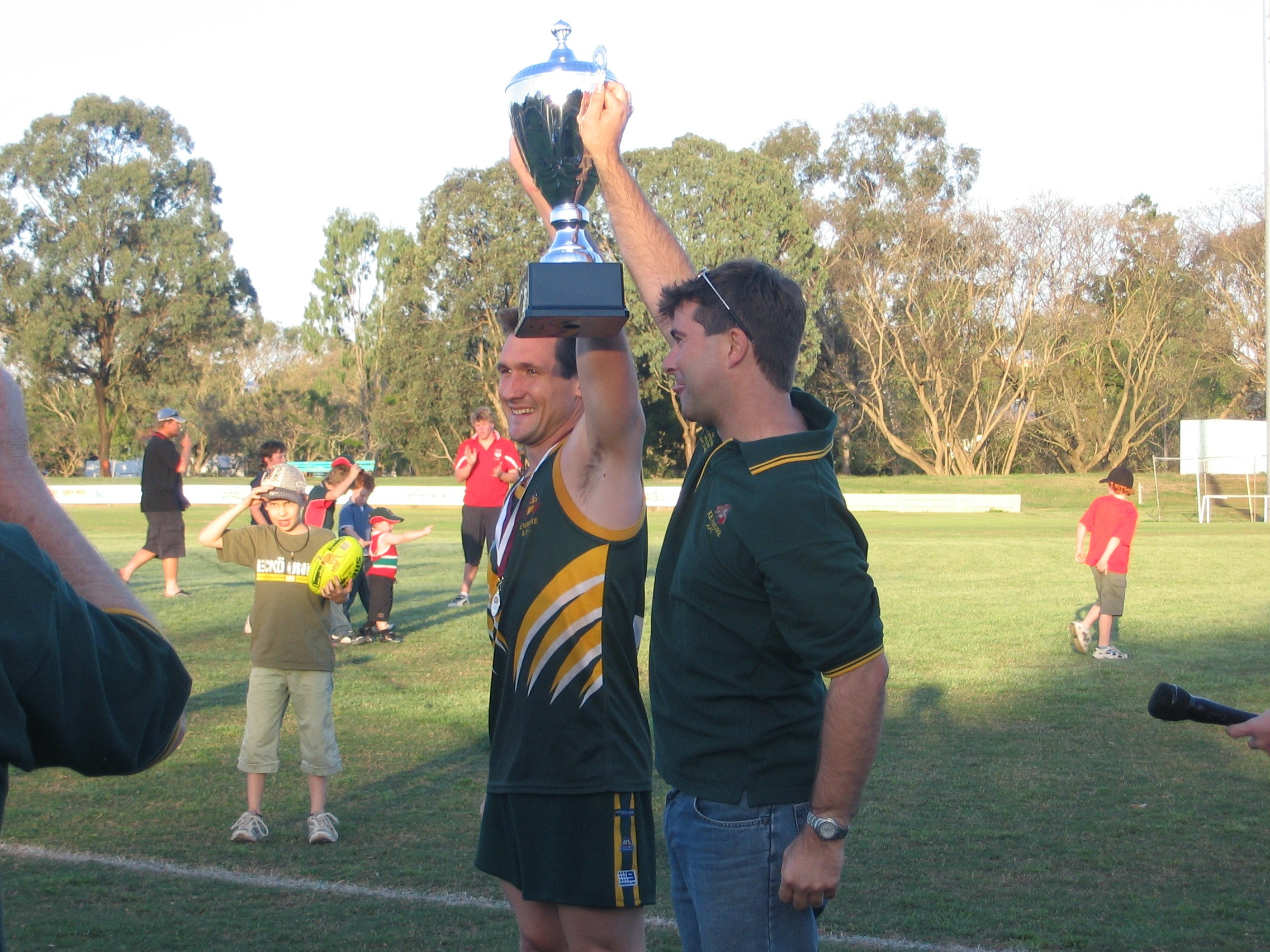
Peter Stowasser (Captain) and Jeff Williams (Coach) raise the Premiership Trophy

- 2006 SHAYNE ETHERTON for Highest Goalkicker in the Season (100)
- 2007 PETER STOWASSER and SHAYNE ETHERTON selected in the AFLQ State Association Division 1 Team of the Year
- 2008 PETER STOWASSER selected in the AFLQ State Association Division 1 Team of the Year
- 2009 TIM PLUMMER voted Best and Fairest in the AFLQ State Association Division 1 Seniors
- 2009 PETER STOWASSER, TIM PLUMMER and TRENT FULLER selected in the AFLQ State Association Division 1 Team of the Year
- 2010 TIM PLUMMER selected in the AFLQ State Association Division 1 Team of the Year
- 2011 TIM PLUMMER and TOM BALDWIN selected in the AFLQ State Association Division 1 Team of the Year
- 2012 TIM PLUMMER, TOM BALDWIN and NICK IELASI selected in the AFLQ State Association Division 2 Team of the Year

== Honour Board ==
Year	President	Seniors Coach	Seniors Captain	Seniors B&F	Seniors Result	Reserves Result	Under 18 Result	Clubman	Life Members
1997	Paul Cox	Ian Plummer	Lachlan Grantley	Lachlan Grantley	Premiers	-	-		
1998	Paul Cox	Ian Plummer	L. Grantley & L. McKenzie	Ben Fullerton	Premiers	-	-		
1999	Ian Plummer	Sean Luhrs	Brad Lennon	Shane Whelan	?	-	-		
2000	George Savage	John Humphries	Jeff Williams	Jeff Williams	Grand Final	-	-		
2001	George Savage	John Humphries	J. Williams & B. Lennon	Anthony Randell	Grand Final	-	-		
2002	George Savage	Darren Bourne	Anthony Randell	Scott Matthews	Premiers	-	-		
2003	George Savage	Darren Bourne	Scott Matthews	Peter Stowasser	Last	Premiers	-		
2004	John Muldoon	Darren Bourne	Peter Stowasser	Peter Stowasser	5th of 8	5th of 8	-	C. Murphy	
2005	John Muldoon	Jeff Williams	Peter Stowasser	Nick Dunn	Preliminary Finals	Semi-Finals	-	T. Muldoon	
2006	Ash Steffensen	Jeff Williams	Peter Stowasser	Brendan Stirling	Premiers	Semi-Finals	-	A. Steffensen	
2007	Ash Steffensen	Jeff Williams	Peter Stowasser	Peter Stowasser	8th of 10	9th of 10	Semi-Finals	P. Loft	
2008	Ash Steffensen	Hayden Ryan	P. Stowasser & T.Fuller	Brendan Stirling	6th of 8	7th of 8	Premiers	D. Holdsworth	
2009	Peter Loft	Ron Wolfe	Trent Fuller	Tim Plummer	Semi-Finals	8th of 9	7th of 8	B. Cotton	Ian Plummer
2010	Terry Mumford	Steve Matthews	J. Dobson & R. Chaustowski	Simon Plummer	8th	8th	7th	L. Pearson	Ashley Steffensen
2011	Terry Mumford	Tom Corless	Tim Plummer	Tim Plummer	6th	5th	Premiers	R. Charlton	Craig Graves
2012	Terry Mumford	Tom Corless	T. Plummer & B. Stirling	Nick Ielasi	3rd	7th	2nd	C. Baldwin	Scott Matthews
2013	Terry Mumford	Tom Corless	S. Loney & J. Dimasi	Jesse Dimasi	9th	3rd	NA	L. Meadows	Damian Joyce
2014	Terry Mumford	Will Fozard	Jesse Dimasi	Anthony Corrie	3rd	5th	NA	B. Boston	Bob Cotton
2015	Terry Mumford	Will Fozard	Jesse Dimasi	Kale Reed	3rd	5th	NA	C & J Fozard	Terry Mumford
2016	Terry Mumford	Anthony Corrie (cap/coach)	Kale Reed	Jake De Winter			NA	Anthony Corrie	Peter Loft
2017	Terry Mumford	Anthony Corrie	Kale Reed	Darcey Thynne & Daniel Wayne			NA	Tim Kielly	Tim Plummer
2018	Terry Mumford	Matthew Ashenden	Sam Masuino	Harry Baldwin		Premiers Asst Coach Craig Hardy	NA	Matthew Ashenden	Cath & John Baldwin
2019	Terry Mumford	Matthew Ashenden	Matthew Waters	Matthew Waters			NA	Jake Rooks	
2020	Terry Mumford	Matthew Ashenden	Matthew Waters	Matthew Waters	Premiers	Premiers	NA	Sam Masuino	Daniel Wayne
2021	Terry Mumford	Daniel Wayne	Nicholas Waters & Jacob Luhrs	Zach Templeton	6th				
2022	Terry Mumford	Justin Davies	Nicholas Waters	Zach Templeton	Sem-Final	Preliminary Final	NA	Lachie Adams	
2023	Terry Mumford	Justin Davies	Nicholas Waters	Zach Templeton	Grand Final	6th	NA	David Hill	

== See also ==
- AFLQ State Association
