= Zac Smith =

Australian rules footballer (born 1990)

Personal information
- Full name: Zac Smith
- Born: 22 February 1990 (age 36); Biloela, Queensland, Australia
- Original team: Zillmere (QAFL)
- Draft: Zone Selection, 2009, Gold Coast
- Height: 206 cm (6 ft 9 in)
- Weight: 105 kg (231 lb)
- Position: Ruckman

Playing career^{1}
Years	Club	Games (Goals)
2011–2015	Gold Coast	65 (31)
2016–2019	Geelong	50 (20)
2020–2021	Gold Coast	9 (3)
Total		124 (54)

International team honours^{2}
Years	Team	Games (Goals)
2011	Australia	2 (0)
- ^{1} Playing statistics correct to the end of 2021.^{2} Representative statistics correct as of 2011.

Career highlights
- Inaugural Gold Coast team; 2011 AFL Rising Star nominee

Zac Smith (born 22 February 1990) is a former professional Australian rules footballer who played for the Gold Coast Suns and the Geelong Football Club in the Australian Football League (AFL). He played for Gold Coast from 2011 to 2015 and 2020 to 2021, as well as Geelong between 2016 and 2019.

== Early life ==
Born in Biloela, Queensland, he and his family moved to Rockhampton, Queensland, when he was 10 years old. In his early teens, he played soccer and represented Queensland in doing so. In October 2006, he was convinced by some school friends at North Rockhampton State High School to play Australian rules football for the first time at 16 years of age and was invited to join the AFL Queensland Rookie Search Program.

In 2007, he joined the Glenmore Bulls Under-17's team and finished the season as the runner-up in the best and fairest award. The following year he moved to Brisbane to join the Zillmere Eagles senior team for the 2008 QAFL season. Midway through the season he had to choose whether to accept an offer from the newly formed GC17 team or to elect for the 2008 AFL draft. Despite playing less than 20 games of football at any level, Smith received letters of drafting interest from Collingwood, Hawthorn, Geelong, North Melbourne and Port Adelaide while Richmond football manager Craig Cameron paid him a visit at his Brisbane home.

In August 2008, he was the fourth player to sign for the Gold Coast Football Club as a Queensland zone selection and played for the club in the 2009 TAC Cup season, where he was selected as first ruck in the TAC Cup Team of the Year. He played all but one game in the 2010 VFL season and was named in the AFL Queensland Team of the Year, the only VFL player selected.

== AFL career ==
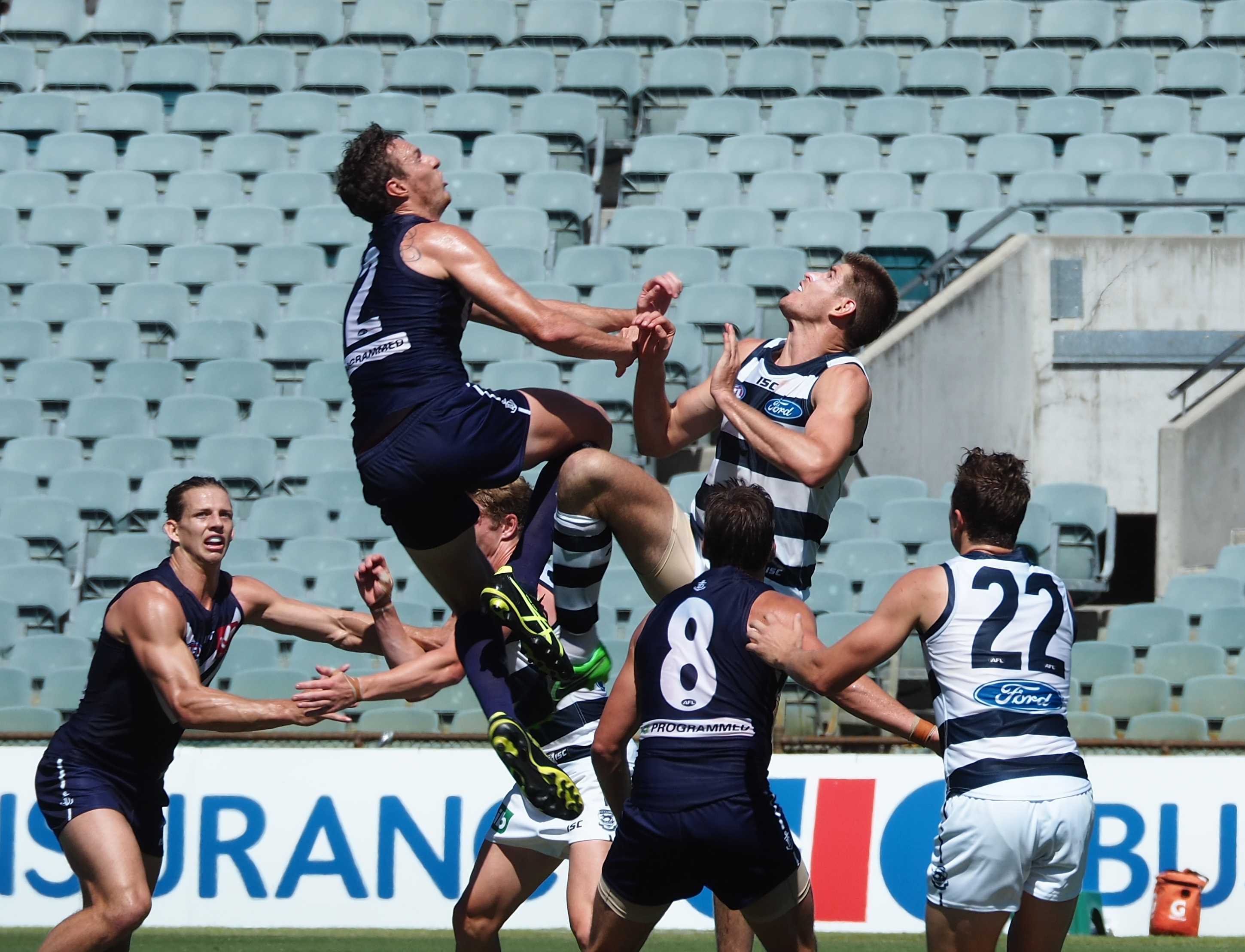
Jon Griffin (#12 purple, Fremantle) and Zac Smith (Geelong) compete in the ruck in March 2016.

Smith made his debut in round 2, 2011, in the Gold Coast Suns' inaugural AFL match against Carlton at the Gabba. In the same game, Smith scored Gold Coast's first-ever point in the AFL with a behind.

In round 5, Smith was part of the first Gold Coast Suns' victory over Port Adelaide at AAMI Stadium. He had 18 hitouts and kicked a goal.

In round 7, Smith was part of the Gold Coast side that defeated Brisbane Lions in the inaugural QClash. He had 22 possessions and 17 hitouts, rucking the majority of the night against Matthew Leuenberger and Mitch Clark. For his efforts, Smith was given the round 7 nomination for the 2011 AFL Rising Star award. He joined teammate Brandon Matera as AFL Rising Star nominees in Gold Coast's inaugural season.

In 2013, Smith was the Gold Coast Suns’ Domestic Violence Awareness ambassador and a leader of their Horizons program, earning him the Jim Stynes Community Leadership Award that came with a $20,000 prize to be distributed to a charity of his choice. Smith was also a White Ribbon ambassador "who had gone above and beyond to identify how he and his teammates could support the cause and deliver key messages".

In October 2015, he was traded to Geelong.

After four years at Geelong, Smith returned to the Gold Coast at the conclusion of the 2019 AFL season. He retired at the end of the 2021 AFL season.
