= Sherwood Districts Australian Football Club =

Sherwood Districts Magpies

Names
- Full name: Sherwood Magpies Australian Football Club
- Nickname: Magpies
- Club song: Good Old Sherwood Club Forever

2026 QAFL season
- Home-and-away season: 9th

Club details
- Founded: 1991; 35 years ago
- Competition: Queensland Australian Football League
- President: Bruce McNichoal
- Coach: Glenn Humphrey
- Captain: Lachlan Woods
- Premierships: QAFL: 1 (1996)
- Ground: McCarthy Homes Sherwood AFC, Chelmer

Uniforms
Home

Other information
- Official website: westernmagpies.com.au

The Sherwood Magpies Australian Football Club is the senior Australian rules football club of the western suburbs of Brisbane which competes in Division One of the AFLQ State League. The club is based at McCarthy Homes Oval, 41 Chelmer st, Chelmer, at the same grounds as the Sherwood Junior Australian Football Club and fields a team in the AFLQ senior, reserve, under 18 and women's grade competitions.

The club formed through a merger between the Western Districts AFC and the Sherwood AFC in 1991 but has roots back to 1920. A number of senior clubs have represented Brisbane's western suburbs for decades including the Taringa, Western Districts, Sherwood, and West Brisbane) and competed in the highest division of local football. These clubs were all forced out of existence over time though the Sherwood Magpies AFC draws much of its culture, identity, heritage and following from them. The current club has been playing in Division Two of the AFL Queensland State League since 2004, but is being promoted into Division One from the commencement of the 2009 season under the guidance of President Brian Knight, Senior Coach Paul Grentell and Club Development Manager Anthony McDonald.

The club aims to provide a pathway into the AFL for players from local junior clubs, develop the network of surrounding senior and junior Australian rules football clubs, and provide a fun, friendly, family oriented hub for local football in the western suburbs. The Sherwood Magpies Australian Football Club and Sherwood Junior Australian Football Club are sponsored by Tradelink (major sponsor), Hog's Breath Cafe and Cleanway (secondary sponsors). Junior clubs that lie within its traditional area include Collingwood Park, Ferny Grove, Forest Lake, Kenmore, Jindalee, Moorooka, Sherwood, Southern Redbacks, Springfield Lakes, Wests Juniors and Yeronga.

== History ==
The Sherwood Magpies Australian Football Club was formed as the State League representative of Brisbane's western suburbs, incorporating the history of the previous clubs to compete in the AFL Queensland State League.

=== Taringa AFC ===
A Taringa Football Club competed in the QFL (an early form of the AFL Queensland State League) in the 1920 season. The club only appeared in the State competition for that single season, but resurfaced by entering the newly titled QANFL in 1931. The club's emblem was the bulldog, and the club colours were maroon and white. Despite making it to five grand finals Taringa was unable to secure a premiership, but it produced three De Little Medalists in Bill Nunn (1936), C.K. 'Pat' Vidgen (1939) and Doug Pittard (1940). Taringa changed its name to the Western Districts Australian Football Club in 1946.

=== Western Districts AFC ===
The Western Districts Australian Football Club came into existence in 1946 when the Taringa Football Club changed its name to incorporate the whole of Brisbane's western suburbs. Western Districts kept the emblem (the bulldog) and colours (maroon and white) of Taringa and were originally based at Oakman Park, Toowong but moved to Chelmer Oval, Queenscroft st, Chelmer in 1971. The club continued to grow steadily, finishing in third place in 1951, and losing to Mayne by merely one point in the 1952 grand final. The club learned from their narrow loss, defeating Windsor and Sandgate respectively in the 1953 and 1954 grand finals to secure their first and second premierships. Western Districts were unable to qualify for the finals between the years of 1956 and 1962, before suffering consecutive grand final losses at the hands of Mayne in 1966 and 1967. The club's next, and last ever, grand final appearances came consecutively in 1977, 1978 and 1979. The Bulldogs narrowly won premierships by 5 points against Wilston Grange in 1977, and by 4 points against Windsor/Zillmere in 1978, before losing what would be their last grand final appearance to Sandgate in 1979. Western Districts eventually merged with Sherwood in 1991 to form the West Brisbane Australian Football Club. The Western Districts Australian Football Club had a number of very successful players in their midst throughout their existence. Doug Pittard won two Grogan Medals during his time at the club to go with his De Little Medal he won with Taringa, and played a handful of games for the Footscray reserves. Owen Backwell was also a dual Grogan Medalist for the Bulldogs, who topped the league goal kicking in 1977, played over 300 games for the club, including the 1977 and 1978 premierships, and had a short stint with the Fitzroy Football Club. Ray Hughson topped the league goal kicking while playing for Western Districts a remarkable six times (1958, 1959, 1962–65), while Gavin Crosisca (over 250 AFL games for Collingwood), Ray Smith (over 100 VFL games for Essendon and Melbourne), and Gary Shaw (Collingwood and the Brisbane Bears, and still coaches at the Western Magpies) all went on to play in the VFL/AFL.

=== Sherwood AFC ===
The Sherwood Australian Football Club developed out of the Sherwood Junior Australian Football Club, which was formed in 1956. As the junior club grew in size, there was a desire to have a direct senior team for the Sherwood JAFC, which saw the Sherwood AFC formed to compete in the Metropolitan Division of the QAFL. The club was based at Chelmer Oval, 41 Chelmer st, Chelmer, directly next to the Queenscroft st ground of the Western Districts, which is the current home of the Western Magpies. The club took on the black and white stripes of their junior club as well as the emblem of the magpie, both of which are still thoroughly attached to the club to the current day thanks to the winning of a coin toss with Southport (who had previously had the same colours and emblem) upon the entry of both clubs to the QAFL in 1983. This occurred after Sherwood managed to work their way up through the divisions, after winning eight first division flags in a row they earned their 1983 promotion into the QAFL. In 1991 Sherwood AFC merged with the Western Districts to form the West Brisbane Australian Football Club, which could be a single footballing force in Brisbane's western suburbs. Players of particular note for the Sherwood AFC include John Rantall, the 336 game South Melbourne, North Melbourne and Fitzroy VFL veteran who coached Sherwood in their debut season in the QAFL, and 1983 Grogan Medal winner, Bill Pierce, whom the Western Magpies best and fairest is named after.

=== West Brisbane AFC ===
A merger between the Western Districts AFC and the Sherwood AFC in 1991 saw a single senior force in the western suburbs formed in the form of the West Brisbane Australian Football Club. The merged club adopted the maroon and white colours of [Western Districts Australian Football Club] with the jersey design of the Port Adelaide Magpies football club, played out of Chelmer Oval, Chelmer and were nicknamed The Warriors. The club was successful in winning a premiership in the 1996 season, comfortably defeating Mt Gravatt 17.10 (112) to 8.10 (58), with Corey Lambert claiming that year's Grogan Medal. Unfortunately, due to financial reasons West Brisbane were unable to compete in the following year's competition and had a few seasons out of the State competition before returning as the re-branded Western Magpies Australian Football Club in 2001.

=== The Current Club ===
The West Brisbane Australian Football Club that disbanded at the end of 1997 reformed in 1999 under the name of the Western Magpies Australian Football Club and in 2001 re-entered the QAFL which had merged with its Gold Coast equivalent to become the AFL Queensland State League. After four years of mediocre on-field performances and financial struggles, when the AFLQ decided to undertake a major re-shuffling of the leagues in 2004 to create a two tier State League competition the Western Magpies were relegated to the newly created Division Two. Paul Grentell was appointed the club's senior coach, and the Magpies set about strengthening every aspect of the football club in the hopes of returning to Division One. The senior team narrowly missed out on a place in the 2005 Division Two grand final, but were successful in reaching the grand final in 2006, 2007 and 2008. The Western Magpies defeated the Noosa Tigers in the 2006 decider, before losing to the Palm Beach Currumbin Lions in the final game of 2007. Despite losing the 2007 grand final, it was announced at the end of that year that the Western Magpies would be returning to Division One of the State League in 2009. The Magpies rebounded from their 2007 loss to Palm Beach to end the Lions 38-game winning streak at their Chelmer home ground during the 2008 home and away season, and followed this up by defeating the Lions again in a thrilling grand final. This capped the club's time in Division Two off nicely, leaving them with two premierships (2006 & 2008) and three grand final appearances (2006–2008) from their four years in lower division. During this four-year period, the reserves team played in the Division Two grand final (each year 2005–2008), winning premierships in 2005, 2006 and 2007, while the under 18 and women's teams both continued to participate in Division One of their competitions.

As of the beginning of Season 2020 in the Queensland Australian Football League

== Links To Other Local Clubs ==
The Western Magpies enjoy close relationships with all of the junior and senior clubs within Brisbane's western suburbs in their role as the focal point for football ball in the area. All junior clubs within the area are encouraged to promote the Western Magpies as the pathway into the AFL for young players in the western suburbs. In a similar way, the club also relates closely with the surrounding senior clubs, as they also provide a pathway for players to play at a standard of football that best suits their ability. In particular, the Western Magpies work closely with the Sherwood Junior Australian Football Club and the Kenmore Australian Football Club. The junior clubs within the western suburbs that the Western Magpies work with include;

- Collingwood Park
- Ferny Grove
- Forest Lake
- The Gap
- Kenmore
- Jindalee
- Moggill
- Moorooka
- Park Ridge
- Sherwood
- Southern Redbacks
- Springfield Lakes
- Wests Juniors
- Yeronga

=== Sherwood Junior AFC ===
The senior Western Magpies club is based out of the same grounds and facilities as the Sherwood Junior AFC. The Sherwood Junior AFC was founded in 1956. It is also now known as the Magpies. Both are affiliated with the Sherwood Football social club, and Sherwood Junior AFC acts as one of the many local feeder clubs to the Western Magpies, with many juniors moving up from the Sherwood juniors into the senior club. The Sherwood Junior AFC's aim is to produce quality players to graduate into football with the Western Magpies, and eventually to the AFL. The official website of the Sherwood Junior AFC is located at www.sherwoodafc.com.

=== Kenmore AFC ===
The Kenmore Australian Football Club are a separate club who play in the QFA South competition. The Kenmore Bears and the Western Magpies enjoy a close relationship that sees players transfer between the two clubs in order to play the best possible level of football. The two clubs' grounds are situated next to each other in Chelmer, with Kenmore playing out of the Queenscroft st grounds that were once those of the Western Districts Australian Football Club. In 2008 these grounds were closed for redevelopment, and Kenmore played their all of their home games for that season on the Western Magpies field. The official website of the Kenmore Bears is located at www.kenmore.aflq.com.au.

== 2008 season ==
The Western Magpies Australian Football Club competed in the Pineapple Hotel Cup in 2008, the Division Two competition of the AFL Queensland State League. The president for 2008 was Matthew Vowles, who entered the position in 2007, and the captain Chris Mihalopolous, a junior of the Sherwood Junior AFC. Paul Grentell, who took over the position as senior coach in 2004, was to coach the senior team in 2008, assisted by Peter McClennan (reserves coach), Hadyn Dowley, Quentin Johnson and Brian Millar. After being defeated by the Palm Beach Currumbin Australian Football Club in the 2007 grand final, the Western Magpies went through the 2008 home and away season with fifteen wins out of eighteen games to sit second on the ladder to the Palm Beach Currumbin Lions before the commencement of the finals series. The Magpies's only losses were against Palm Beach Currumbin (Round 1), Coolangatta Tweed Heads (Round 2) and Burleigh (Round 16), and one of the most memorable victories came in Round 14, when the Magpies defeated the Palm Beach Currumbin Lions 18.8 (116) to 5.16 (46) to end the Lions's 34-game winning streak. The Western Magpies and the Palm Beach Currumbin Lions both made it through the finals series into the 2008 AFL Queensland State League grand final for a rematch of the previous year's grand final. The two clubs fought out a tough contest, which saw the Lions lead throughout the first three quarters of the game. The Magpies lifted during the third quarter to close in on the minor premiers, and managed to kick six goals to two in a thrilling final quarter to take out a nail biting decider, 16.8 (104) to 14.17 (101). The Magpies reserves went through the home and away season with only two losses, to Wilston Grange and Burleigh. This left the team on top of the ladder, one game clear of their closest rivals. The reserves won their way straight through to the grand final, where they were unable to make it four consecutive Division Two premierships, being soundly beaten by Aspley 10.8 (68) to 21.7 (133). The Western Magpies under 18 team won three of their matches curing the season, and were unable to secure a place in the finals.

=== Award winners ===
The following awards were presented at the Western Magpies Australian Football Club presentation night on 18 October.

==== Seniors ====
- Bill Pierce Medal for Best & Fairest – Val Pope
- Runner-Up Best & Fairest – Richard Wenham
- Most Consistent – Greg Friis
- BG Award – Tim McEvoy
- Rookie of the Year – Gerard Moore
- Best Back – Mark Dowley
- Best Midfielder – Richard Wenham
- Best Forward – Adam Gillespie
- Best Finals Player – Luke Scott
- Best on Ground in the Grand Final – James Rozynski

==== Reserves ====
- Best & Fairest – Jye Spencer
- Runner-Up Best & Fairest – Blake McClennan
- Most Consistent – Luke Knight
- Most Improved Player – Dominic Beer
- Best Back – Scott Hughes
- Best Midfielder – Matthew Page
- Best Forward – Jay Baker
- Best Finals Player – Cameron Thomas

==== Under 18 ====
- Maurie McNamee Medal for Best & Fairest – Mark Stratton
- Runner-Up Best & Fairest – Daniel Massey
- Most Consistent – Cory Colhoun
- Most Improved – Jordan Patterson
- Encouragement Award – Matthew Green
- Russell Green Memorial Trophy for Coach of the Year – Gary Shaw

== 2009 season ==
It was announced at the end of 2007 that the Western Magpies would be returning to Division One of the AFL Queensland State League from 2009. After achieving successful results, it was felt that the Magpies had made enough progress to warrant a western suburbs presence in the State League. In 2008 the club hired Anthony McDonald as Club Development Officer to assist in the progression up to the State League, and began interviewing potential players to bolster their playing list for the 2009 season. The club's existing young talent was bolstered by the signings of 2007 Tasmanian under 18 representative Matt Dillon and former St Kilda rookie and Western Magpie junior Ed McDonnell but overall the Magpies failed to recruit many top level players. The Western Magpies senior squad were put through a tough pre-season program before hosting the Redland Bombers in round one of the season. The Magpies seniors team were unable to get a victory in their first match in the AFL Queensland State League, losing by 48 points in a match that has so far set the tone for their season. The Western Magpies seniors are currently yet to record a victory in the 2009 season, as seen in the table of results below;

Round	Venue	Opposition	Magpies Score	Opposition Score
1	Chelmer	Redland	11.7.73	17.19.121
2	Cooke-Murphy Oval	Labrador Tigers	4.6.30	22.19.151
3	Chelmer	Broadbeach Cats	15.6.96	21.11.137
4	Fankhauser Reserve	Southport Sharks	2.7.19	28.12.180
5	Chelmer	Aspley Hornets	17.9.111	18.19.118
6	Chelmer	Morningside Panthers	10.7.67	31.13.199
7	Traeger Park	Northern Territory Thunder	6.7.43	26.13.169
8	Chelmer	Brisbane Lions	11.10.76	16.9.105
9	Esplen Oval	Morningside Panthers	5.5.35	27.21.183
10	Dittmer Park	Mount Gravatt Vultures	4.5.29	25.16.166
11	Chelmer	Northern Territory Thunder	10.11.71	16.16.112
12	Chelmer	Labrador Tigers	14.10.94	18.12.120
13	Merrimac Oval	Broadbeach Cats	6.10.46	15.18.108
14	Graham Rd	Aspley Hornets	12.9.81	20.13.133
15	Chelmer	Southport Sharks	5.7.37	15.20.110
16	Chelmer	Mount Gravatt Vultures	12.8.80	17.12.144
17	Victoria Point Oval	Redland	12.7.79	15.16.106
18	The Gabba	Brisbane Lions	8.11.59	32.19.211

=== Seniors Awards ===
- Bill Pierce Medal for Best & Fairest – Ben Heffernan-Roper
- Runner-Up Best & Fairest – Chris Judson
- BG Award – Luke Scott
- Rookie of the Year – Ben Jaenke-Cain
- Best Back – Ed McDonnell
- Best Midfielder – Ben Heffernan-Roper
- Best Forward – Josh Barton
- Hard luck story - Chris McClennan

== Honour List ==
=== Senior Premierships ===
Queensland Australian Football League

- 1953 – Western Districts
- 1954 – Western Districts
- 1977 – Western Districts
- 1978 – Western Districts
- 1996 – West Brisbane

AFL Queensland State League – Division Two

- 2006 – Western Magpies
- 2008 – Western Magpies

SEQAFL Division One - PHC

- 2012

=== AFL/VFL Listed Players ===
- Ray Smith (Western Districts) – Essendon Bombers (1971–1975, 77 games 1 goal), Melbourne Demons (1975–1976, 27 games 1 goal)
- Gary Shaw (Western Districts) – Collingwood Magpies (1983–1986, 32 games 33 goals), Brisbane Bears (1987, 6 games 5 goals)
- Craig Potter (Western Districts) – Sydney Swans (1984–1990, 42 games 16 goals) Brisbane Bears (1991–1993, 13 games 3 goals)
- Gavin Crosisca (Western Districts) – Collingwood Magpies (1987–2000, 246 games 64 goals)
- Simon Luhrs (Western Districts) – Brisbane Bears (1991–1993, 12 games 0 goals)
- Simon Hose (Western Districts) – Sydney Swans (1986–1988, 0 games 0 goals) Brisbane Bears (1989–1990, 5 games, 2 goals)
- Marty Pask (Western Magpies) – Brisbane Lions (2006, 8 games 4 goals), Western Bulldogs (2007, 0 games 0 goals)

=== Grogan Medallists ===
Note: Prior to 1946, the Grogan Medal was titled the De Little Medal.

- 1939 – C.Vigden (Taringa)
- 1940 – D.Pittard (Taringa)
- 1946 – D.Pittard (Western Districts)
- 1947 – D.Pittard (Western Districts)
- 1956 – T.Pelly (Western Districts)
- 1958 – A.Stewart (Western Districts)
- 1971 – O.Backwell (Western Districts)
- 1975 – O.Backwell (Western Districts)
- 1977 – P.Taylor (Western Districts)
- 1983 – W.Pierce (Sherwood)
- 1996 – C.Lambert (West Brisbane)

=== League Leading Goalkickers ===
- 1958 – R.Hughson (Western Districts) [71]
- 1959 – R.Hughson (Western Districts) [114]
- 1962 – R.Hughson (Western Districts) [105]
- 1963 – R.Hughson (Western Districts) [109]
- 1964 – R.Hughson (Western Districts) [111]
- 1965 – R.Hughson (Western Districts) [90]
- 1977 – O.Backwell (Western Districts) [93]
