= Jack Stanley (footballer) =

English footballer

Personal information
- Full name: John Stanley
- Date of birth: 1883
- Place of birth: Longton, Staffordshire, England
- Date of death: 1921 (aged 37–38)
- Position: Full back

Senior career*
| Years | Team | Apps | (Gls) |
| 1905–1906 | Wolverhampton Wanderers | 20 | (0) |
| 1906–1910 | Bolton Wanderers | 67 | (0) |
| 1910 | Crewe Alexandra | | |
| Total | | 87 | (0) |
- * Club domestic league appearances and goals

John Stanley (1883–1921) was an English footballer who played in the Football League for Bolton Wanderers and Wolverhampton Wanderers.
