= Danny Stanley =

Australian rules footballer, born 1988

Personal information
- Full name: Daniel Stanley
- Born: 18 February 1988 (age 38); Victoria
- Original team: Geelong Falcons (TAC Cup)
- Draft: No. 21, 2005 National Draft, Collingwood; No. 5, 2010 Rookie Draft, Gold Coast
- Height: 187 cm (6 ft 2 in)
- Weight: 88 kg (194 lb)
- Position: Midfielder, forward

Playing career^{1}
Years	Club	Games (Goals)
2006–2009	Collingwood	5 (0)
2011–2016	Gold Coast	83 (39)
Total		88 (39)
- ^{1} Playing statistics correct to the end of 2016.

Career highlights
- Gold Coast Suns leading goalkicker: 2011

Daniel Stanley (born 18 February 1988) is a former professional Australian rules footballer who played for the Collingwood Football Club and Gold Coast Football Club in the Australian Football League (AFL). Stanley played his junior football with the Ocean Grove Football Club in the Bellarine Football League (BFL).

== AFL career ==
=== Collingwood career (2006–2009) ===
Stanley was recruited by the Collingwood in the 2005 AFL draft. He was delisted by Collingwood at the end of the 2009 season.

After being de-listed by Collingwood in October 2009, Danny trained with Fremantle before being selected by Gold Coast in the 2010 Pre-Season Draft.

=== Gold Coast career (2011–2016) ===
He finished the 2011 season playing every game, and finished with a tally of 20 goals.

He was delisted in October 2015, however, he was re-drafted in the 2016 Rookie Draft. He failed to break into the senior side in 2016 due to injury and was delisted again at the season's conclusion.

== Statistics ==
Legend
G	Goals	K	Kicks	D	Disposals	T	Tackles
B	Behinds	H	Handballs	M	Marks

Season	Team	No.	Games	Totals							Averages (per game)						
Season	Team	No.	Games	G	B	K	H	D	M	T	G	B	K	H	D	M	T
2006	Collingwood	28	0	—	—	—	—	—	—	—	—	—	—	—	—	—	—
2007	Collingwood	28	2	0	0	11	7	18	8	3	0.0	0.0	5.5	3.5	9.0	4.0	1.5
2008	Collingwood	28	2	0	0	14	11	25	8	5	0.0	0.0	7.0	5.5	12.5	4.0	2.5
2009	Collingwood	28	1	0	0	3	12	15	3	1	0.0	0.0	3.0	12.0	15.0	3.0	1.0
2011	Gold Coast	25	22	20	18	197	248	445	99	76	0.9	0.8	9.0	11.3	20.2	4.5	3.5
2012	Gold Coast	25	13	1	3	163	150	313	92	36	0.1	0.2	12.5	11.5	24.1	7.1	2.8
2013	Gold Coast	25	18	10	7	179	197	376	89	66	0.6	0.4	9.9	10.9	20.9	4.9	3.7
2014	Gold Coast	25	22	7	5	203	167	370	89	61	0.3	0.2	9.2	7.6	16.8	4.0	2.8
2015	Gold Coast	25	8	1	4	77	46	123	20	21	0.1	0.5	9.6	5.8	15.4	2.5	2.6
2016	Gold Coast	25	0	—	—	—	—	—	—	—	—	—	—	—	—	—	—
Career			88	39	37	847	838	1685	408	269	0.4	0.4	9.6	9.5	19.1	4.6	3.1
