= Jeremy Taylor (Australian footballer) =

Australian rules footballer

Personal information
- Full name: Jeremy Taylor
- Born: 17 June 1992 (age 34)
- Original team: Geelong Falcons (TAC Cup)
- Draft: No. 39, 2010 National Draft, Gold Coast
- Height: 191 cm (6 ft 3 in)
- Weight: 83 kg (183 lb)
- Position: Defender

Playing career^{1}
Years	Club	Games (Goals)
2011–2012	Gold Coast	10 (1)
- ^{1} Playing statistics correct to the end of 2013.

Jeremy Taylor (born 17 June 1992) is an Australian rules football player with the Gold Coast Football Club in the Australian Football League (AFL).

He made his AFL debut for the Gold Coast in Round 19 of the 2011 AFL season against St Kilda. He had performed well in the pre-season games, but a groin injury that required surgery delayed his AFL debut to near the end of the season.
