= Sam Iles =

Australian rules footballer

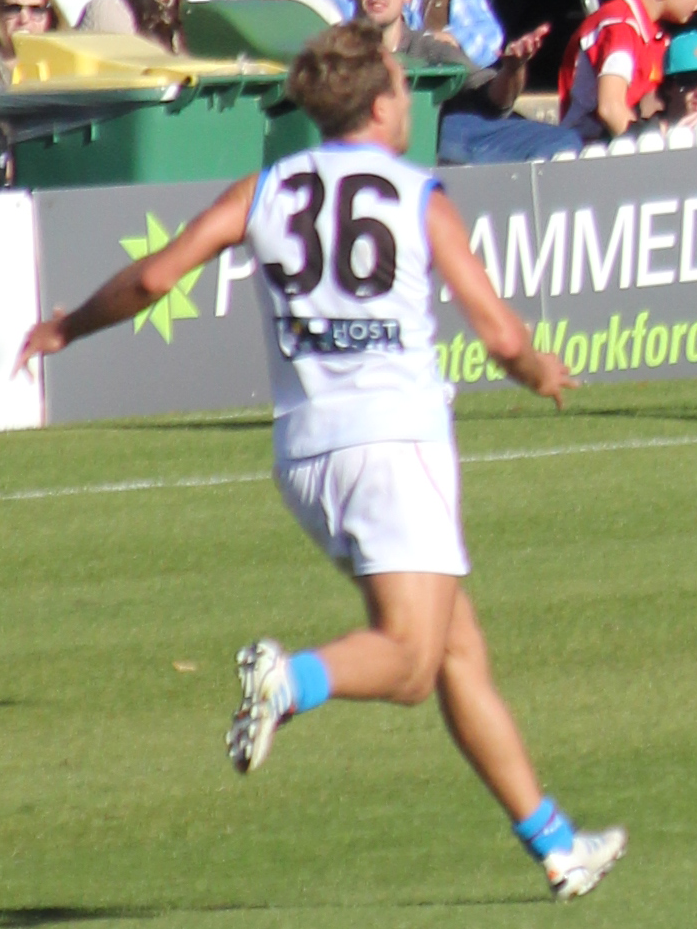
- Iles playing for Gold Coast in 2012

Personal information
- Full name: Sam Iles
- Born: 19 June 1987 (age 39)
- Original team: Tassie Mariners (N U/18 Championships)
- Draft: No. 2, 2006 Pre-season draft, (Collingwood); No. 3, 2010 Rookie draft, (Gold Coast)
- Height: 185 cm (6 ft 1 in)
- Weight: 83 kg (183 lb)
- Position: Midfielder

Playing career^{1}
Years	Club	Games (Goals)
2006–2007	Collingwood	7 (0)
2011–2012	Gold Coast	26 (11)
Total		33 (11)
- ^{1} Playing statistics correct to the end of 2012.

Career highlights
- Gold Coast Suns Club Champion: 2010; VFL premiership player: 2013

Sam Iles (born 19 June 1987) is an Australian rules footballer who played for Collingwood and Gold Coast in the Australian Football League (AFL).

== Football career ==
Iles was picked up in the 2006 Pre-Season draft by Collingwood after he was not taken in the National Draft weeks earlier. Iles played in the VFL for Tasmania as well as for state side in the TAC Cup, which showed signs of development at an early age. He made his debut against Adelaide at AAMI Stadium late in the 2006 season. He played 4 games, being dropped before the finals.

Iles found it hard to break into the Collingwood line-up, even with strong and consistent form for Williamstown, managing just the one senior game in the first half of the season, whilst being named as an emergency on nine occasions. He returned to the side again in Round 14 against St Kilda and performed well, gathering 19 possessions and making four tackles to help the Magpies win after being 21-points down in the last quarter. However, he would only play for Collingwood the following week against Geelong before being dropped back to Williamstown for the remainder of the year.

Sam got delisted at the end of the 2008 season, after failing to play a senior game for Collingwood in 2008. In 2009, he played for Box Hill Hawks in the VFL, and was drafted to the new Gold Coast Football Club in the 2010 Rookie Draft. Iles made his Gold Coast debut in their first win against Port Adelaide at AAMI Stadium in round 5.

Iles was delisted by the Suns at the end of 2012 and joined Box Hill Hawks in the VFL in time for the start of the 2013 season. Iles was a member of Box Hill's premiership-winning team in 2013 and also played in Box Hill's 2014 grand final team that lost to the Footscray Bulldogs.
