= Brandon Matera =

Australian rules footballer (born 1992)

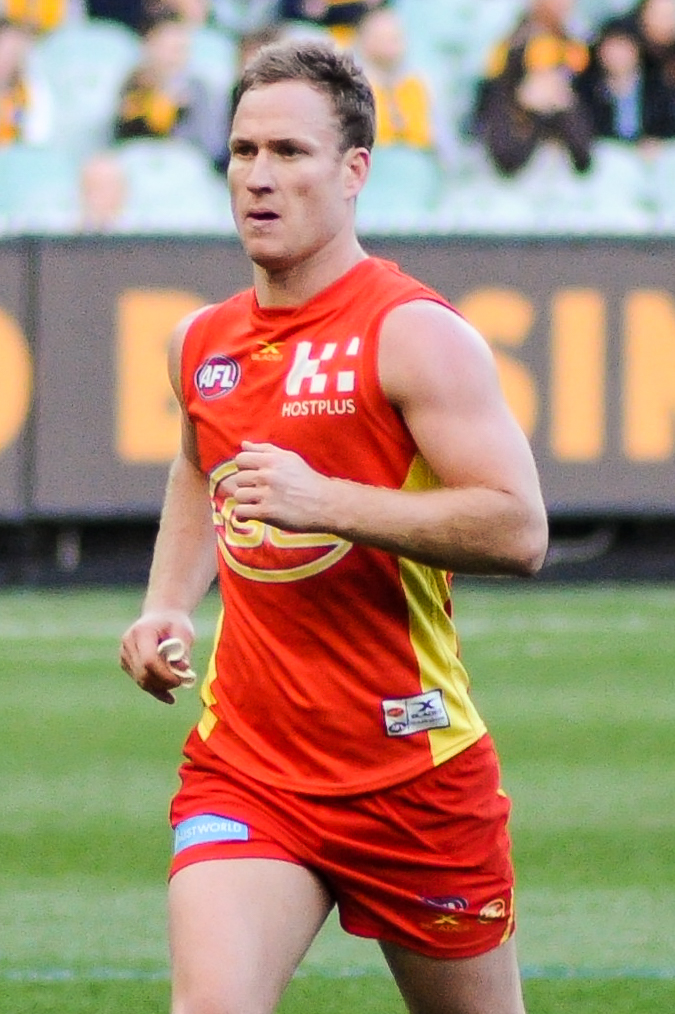
- Matera playing for Gold Coast in June 2017

Personal information
- Full name: Brandon Matera
- Born: 11 March 1992 (age 34)
- Original team: South Fremantle (WAFL)
- Draft: Underage recruit, Gold Coast
- Height: 175 cm (5 ft 9 in)
- Weight: 76 kg (168 lb)
- Position: Midfielder / Forward

Playing career^{1}
Years	Club	Games (Goals)
2011–2017	Gold Coast	101 (124)
2018–2020	Fremantle	43 (46)
Total		144 (170)
- ^{1} Playing statistics correct to the end of 2020.

Career highlights
- Inaugural Gold Coast team; 2011 AFL Rising Star nominee

Brandon Matera (born 11 March 1992) is a former professional Australian rules footballer who played for the Gold Coast Football Club (2011–2017) and the Fremantle Football Club (2018–2020) in the Australian Football League (AFL). He was recruited as one of twelve 17-year-olds made available to Gold Coast under the AFL's draft concessions.

Matera is the son of former Fitzroy and West Coast player Wally Matera and the nephew of former West Coast footballers Phil and Peter Matera. He is of Italian and Indigenous Australian (Noongar) heritage.

== Junior career ==
Matera came up through the junior system of the South Fremantle Football Club and represented Western Australia at under-16 and under-18 levels.

Matera was named in the 2009 Under-18 All Australian team following the 2009 AFL National Under-18 Championships.

== AFL career ==
=== Gold Coast: 2011–2017 ===
Matera made his debut in Round 2, 2011, in the Gold Coast Suns inaugural AFL match against Carlton at the Gabba.

In Round 5, Matera was part of the first Gold Coast Suns victory. He kicked 4 goals, and for his efforts was the round 5 nomination for the 2011 AFL Rising Star.

=== Fremantle: 2018–2020 ===
During the 2017 AFL Trade period, Matera was traded to Fremantle; he was delisted after the 2020 season.
