= Michael Coad =

Australian rules footballer

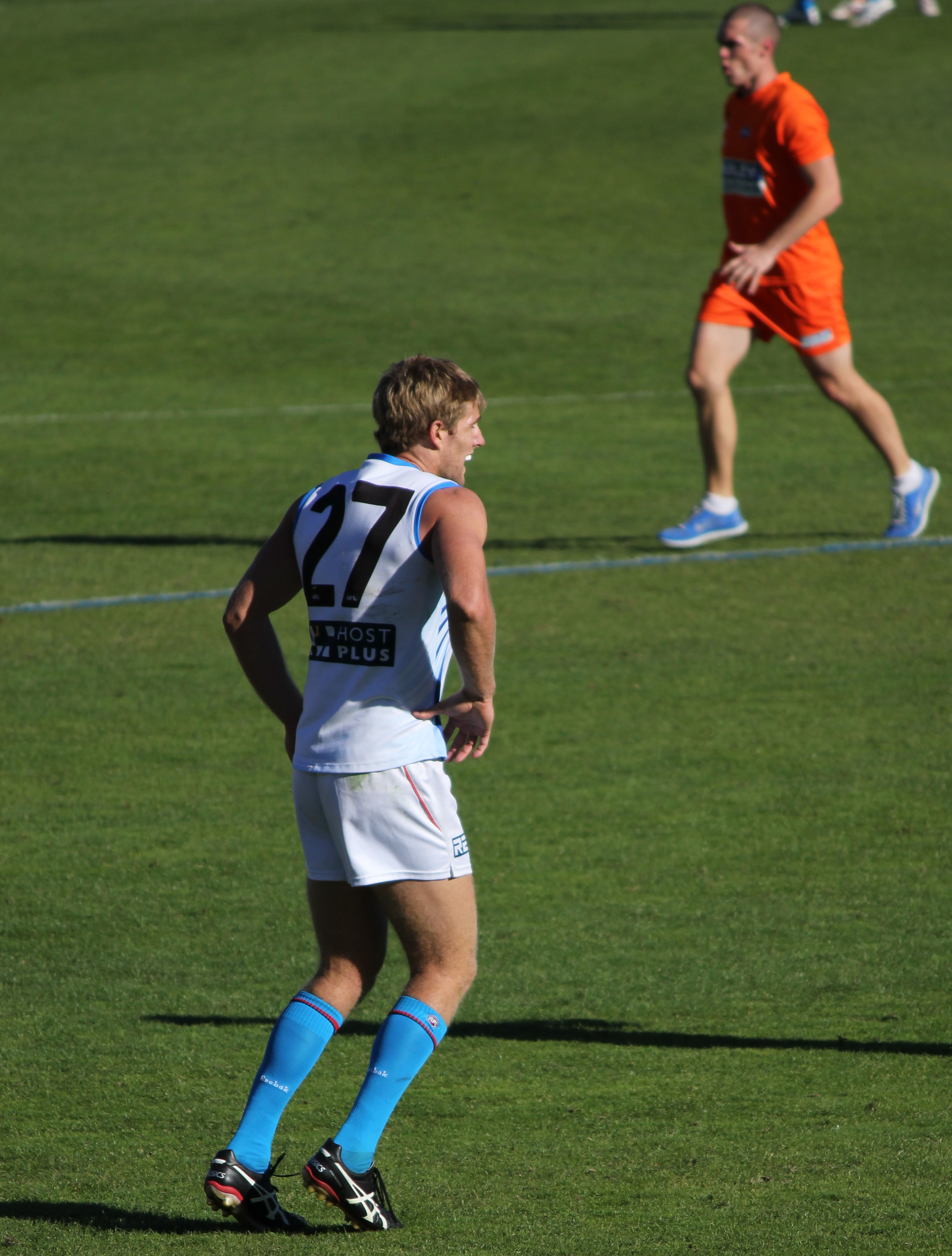
- Coad playing for Gold Coast in 2012

Personal information
- Full name: Michael Coad
- Born: 13 September 1983 (age 43)
- Original team: Sturt (SANFL)
- Draft: No. 2, 2010 Rookie draft, Gold Coast
- Height: 190 cm (6 ft 3 in)
- Weight: 86 kg (190 lb)

Playing career^{1}
Years	Club	Games (Goals)
2011–2012	Gold Coast	6 (0)
- ^{1} Playing statistics correct to the end of 2012.

Michael Coad is a former professional Australian rules footballer who played with Australian Football League (AFL) club Gold Coast.

Originally from South Australian National Football League (SANFL) club Sturt, Coad was drafted by Gold Coast as a mature age rookie with pick number two of the 2010 AFL Rookie draft and was elevated to Gold Coast's senior list for their first season. He made his senior AFL debut against Western Bulldogs in round 3 of the 2011 AFL season.

Coad suffered a serious hamstring injury in his 2nd game for the Gold Coast, ruling him out for the remainder of the 2011 season. Coad was delisted by Gold Coast on 3 September 2011 but redrafted by them in the 2012 Rookie draft. Coad has since played one further AFL match for Gold Coast. Coad then moved back to Sturt of the South Australian Football League in 2013, soon being selected as Captain for the Sturt Football Club. In 2015 Coad called quits on his senior football career.
