= Jared Brennan =

Australian rules footballer (born 1984)

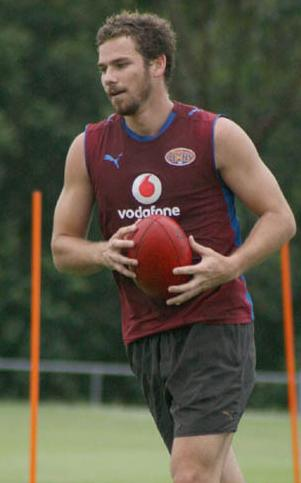
- Brennan at training with Brisbane in December 2008

Personal information
- Full name: Jared Brennan
- Born: 28 July 1984 (age 42); Darwin, Northern Territory
- Original team: Southern Districts (NTFL)
- Draft: No. 3, 2002 National Draft, Brisbane Lions
- Height: 195 cm (6 ft 5 in)
- Weight: 95 kg (209 lb)
- Position: Utility

Playing career^{1}
Years	Club	Games (Goals)
2003–2010	Brisbane Lions	119 (75)
2011–2013	Gold Coast	54 (26)
Total		173 (101)

International team honours
Years	Team	Games (Goals)
2008	Australia	2
- ^{1} Playing statistics correct to the end of 2013.

Career highlights
- Inaugural Gold Coast team; Rd 7 2011 Marcus Ashcroft Medal; 2003 AFL Rising Star nominee

Jared Brennan (born 28 July 1984) is a former professional Australian rules footballer, who last represented the Gold Coast Football Club in the Australian Football League (AFL). He also previously represented the Brisbane Lions.

== Early life ==
Brennan was born and raised in Darwin in the Northern Territory, where he played rugby league and Australian football at junior levels. Brennan grew up a passionate rugby league supporter, but also supported the Essendon Football Club in the AFL.

Brennan was first identified as a potential AFL talent during his All-Australian performance at the AFL Under 18 Championships and was co-captain of the Northern Territory side. Brennan's unique ball skills and agility displayed his indigenous heritage with a liking to Daryl White.

He played senior football with Southern Districts where he was drafted to the AFL as the third draft pick in the 2002 AFL draft.

== AFL career ==
=== Brisbane Lions career (2003–2010) ===
Brennan made his debut for the Brisbane Lions in Round 4, 2003 against Collingwood.

Inconsistent form in his early career led to speculation that Brennan would be traded to another club. Coach Leigh Matthews, switched him to the forward line in mid-2007, and against West Coast Eagles in Round 14, Brennan appeared to come of age, leading the charge with four goals.

He followed it up with a personal record of 7 goals against the Collingwood Football Club in round 17.

Season 2008 was arguably Brennan's most consistent to date. Used predominantly as an impact player in the midfield, Brennan proved himself to be a capable clearance winner and played a decisive hand in several close victories. Brennan capped off his 2008 season with a top 5 placing in the 2008 Brisbane Lions best and fairest and selection in the Australian International Rules squad.

Brennan is well known for his flashy, unorthodox playing style and his tendency to carry the ball in one hand. He is often compared to former Brisbane premiership player Darryl White due to a similar playing style and the ability to play different positions.

=== Gold Coast career (2011–2013) ===
On 7 October 2010, a complicated three-way deal between the Gold Coast Suns, the Brisbane Lions and Collingwood saw Brennan traded to the Suns.

At the end of the 2013 season Brennan retired from the game.
