= Jacob Gillbee =

Australian rules footballer (born 1992)

Personal information
- Full name: Jacob Gillbee
- Born: 13 September 1992 (age 34)
- Original team: Lauderdale (SFL)
- Draft: No. 49, 2010 National draft, Gold Coast
- Height: 184 cm (6 ft 0 in)
- Weight: 76 kg (168 lb)

Playing career^{1}
Years	Club	Games (Goals)
2011–2013	Gold Coast	6 (3)
- ^{1} Playing statistics correct to the end of 2013.

Jacob Gillbee is a professional Australian rules football player at the Gold Coast Football Club. He was recruited to the club with the 49th selection in the 2010 AFL draft from the Lauderdale Football Club in Tasmania.

Gillbee made his debut in the final round of Gold Coast's first season, 2011, against Hawthorn. He was named the Suns' best player for the season in their reserves team that plays in the North East Australian Football League (NEAFL).

He is the son of Steve Gillbee who played 250 games for Hobart Football Club. In 2008 Jacob made his senior football debut at the age of 15 for the Lauderdale Football Club in the Southern Football League.

On Australia Day in 2013, Gillbee failed a random breath test whilst driving in Broadbeach, Queensland, recording a blood alcohol content of 0.137.

In 2018 Gillbee returned to his former club Lauderdale Football Club.
