= Alik Magin =

Australian rules footballer

Personal information
- Full name: Alik Magin
- Born: 13 April 1991 (age 35)
- Original team: Labrador (QAFL)
- Height: 181 cm (5 ft 11 in)
- Weight: 72 kg (159 lb)
- Position: Forward

Playing career^{1}
Years	Club	Games (Goals)
2011–12	Gold Coast	8 (3)
- ^{1} Playing statistics correct to the end of 2012.

Career highlights
- Inaugural Gold Coast team

Alik Magin is a former Australian rules footballer. He played for the Gold Coast Suns as a rookie list player during the 2011 and 2012 AFL seasons.

== Playing career ==
Magin was drafted to Gold Coast in the 2011 Rookie Draft. He was elevated from the rookie list to replace Jeremy Taylor and made his debut in Gold Coast's first game, playing against Carlton in round 2 of the 2011 season.

At the end of the 2012 AFL season, Magin was delisted by the Suns. He signed for Victorian Football League club Bendigo Gold, and played with them for two seasons, winning a best and fairest award, until the club folded at the end of 2014.
