= Rex Liddy =

Australian rules footballer

Personal information
- Full name: Rex Liddy
- Born: 2 January 1992 (age 34)
- Original team: Kenmore (AFLQ State Association)
- Draft: Zone selection, Gold Coast
- Height: 185 cm (6 ft 1 in)
- Weight: 86 kg (190 lb)
- Position: Defender

Playing career^{1}
Years	Club	Games (Goals)
2011	Gold Coast	4 (0)
- ^{1} Playing statistics correct to the end of 2011.

Rex Liddy is a former professional Australian rules football player at the Gold Coast Football Club.

== Early life ==
Liddy was raised in Hopevale and Cairns, Queensland, the nephew of Matt Bowen, he was raised Indigenous and speaking Guugu Yimithirr language. Liddy was identified by talent scouts and entered into the AFL KickStart program. He began playing with North Cairns Tigers in AFL Cairns. He joined the Flying Boomerangs in South Africa in 2008 before moving to Brisbane, where he studied at St Peters Lutheran College and played with the Kenmore Bears.

Liddy was one of the Gold Coast's zone priority selections.

== AFL career ==
Liddy debuted in the Gold Coast's first season, in 2011. He made his debut in Round 12, against North Melbourne. At the end of the 2011 season, Liddy announced he had "lost the passion to train and play at the elite level".

== Personal life ==
Liddy is the nephew of leading Rugby league player Matt Bowen.

== Statistics ==
Legend
G	Goals	K	Kicks	D	Disposals	T	Tackles
B	Behinds	H	Handballs	M	Marks

Season	Team	No.	Games	Totals							Averages (per game)						
Season	Team	No.	Games	G	B	K	H	D	M	T	G	B	K	H	D	M	T
2011	Gold Coast	33	4	0	0	10	14	24	7	4	0.0	0.0	2.5	3.5	6.0	1.8	1.0
Career			4	0	0	10	14	24	7	4	0.0	0.0	2.5	3.5	6.0	1.8	1.0
