= Campbell Brown (footballer) =

Australian rules footballer

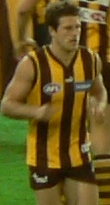
- Playing for Hawthorn during the 2007 AFL season

Personal information
- Full name: Campbell Brown
- Nicknames: Browny, Browndog
- Born: 28 August 1983 (age 43); Perth, Australia
- Original team: Oakleigh Chargers (TAC Cup)
- Draft: No. 32, 2001 national draft
- Debut: Round 11, 2002, Hawthorn vs. Adelaide, at Football Park
- Height: 177 cm (5 ft 10 in)
- Weight: 83 kg (183 lb)
- Position: Defender

Playing career^{1}
Years	Club	Games (Goals)
2002–2010	Hawthorn	159 (64)
2011–2013	Gold Coast	46 (45)
Total		205 (109)

Representative team honours
Years	Team	Games (Goals)
2008	Victoria	1 (1)

International team honours
2006–2008	Australia	4
- ^{1} Playing statistics correct to the end of 2013.

Career highlights
- AFL premiership player: 2008; All-Australian team: 2007

Campbell Brown (born 28 August 1983) is an Australian rules footballer who played for the Hawthorn Football Club and the Gold Coast Football Club in the Australian Football League (AFL) and the current captain of the Australian national Kabaddi team. He led the side at the 2016 Kabaddi World Cup. He was a member of Hawthorn's 2008 AFL Grand Final premiership winning team, but his career was abruptly ended when he was fired for an off field incident with a Gold Coast teammate during the 2014 pre-season.

== AFL career ==
Brown is the son of Australian rules football player and 2004 West Australian Football League Hall of Fame inductee Mal Brown, and attended Scotch College, Melbourne and Deakin University where he studied Sports Management.

=== Hawthorn career (2002–2010) ===
Brown wore the number 30 guernsey and became noted for his overall aggression and toughness. He debuted for the Hawks in 2002, and received a nomination for the Rising Star award.

Brown was in the squad for the Australian international rules football team which competed in the International Rules Series in 2006.

In 2007, Brown held down the centre half back position for Hawthorn, a position usually held by a taller man; Brown being only 179 cm. He was awarded a place in the All-Australian team for his efforts. The same year, Brown was fined $15,000 for giving misleading information to the AFL Tribunal about a misconduct charge involving West Coast's Chris Judd. Vision appeared to show Judd's hand on Brown's face with fingers around Brown's eyes. Brown's evidence at the Tribunal led to the charge against Judd being dropped.

He was part of the Hawthorn premiership team of 2008 that beat Geelong.

During trade week 2009, Brown was allegedly put up for trade, with Hawthorn supposedly chasing Port Adelaide star Shaun Burgoyne. Hawthorn fans and Brown reacted badly to this suggestion with club president Jeff Kennett and coach Alastair Clarkson subsequently confirming the story was untrue.

=== Gold Coast Suns (2011–2013) ===
On 7 September 2010 it was rumoured that Brown would be leaving the Hawks to join new AFL club, the Gold Coast Suns. On 14 September 2010, Brown declined a contract offer from Hawthorn, and he subsequently signed a contract with Gold Coast.

In his second game for Gold Coast, Brown was suspended for four weeks. The AFL match review panel handed Brown a two-match suspension for an off-the-ball elbow to Callan Ward's face and a further two for a high bump on Barry Hall as he bent over to gather the ball.

On 6 August 2011, Brown broke his pelvis while playing against Geelong at Skilled Stadium. The injury ended his 2011 season.

At the end of the 2011 AFL season, Brown was removed from the Suns' leadership group after being involved in a bar fight during the club's end of season trip to Thailand.

In November 2013, following a pre-season camp in Arizona, Brown was accused of breaking the jaw of a teammate, Steven May, during a fight in Los Angeles. May required an operation and had two plates implanted to repair the break in his left jaw. On 28 November 2013, Brown was suspended by the club pending the outcome of an investigation into this incident. On 4 December 2013 Brown was released from the Gold Coast Suns as a result of the incident with May.

Brown's career ended with a total of 29 weeks suspension. This included a four-match ban for striking Melbourne's James Strauss in round 20, 2013, which happened to be his final AFL game; without the sacking, Brown would have missed the opening round of the 2014 season.

=== Post-AFL career ===
Brown made a one-off guest appearance for Devonport in the Tasmanian State League in 2014.

== Kabaddi ==
In 2016, Brown captained Australia's kabaddi team at the 2016 Kabaddi World Cup in Ahmedabad, India.

== Media career ==
As of 2014, Brown is an AFL commentator on Saturday nights for Triple M

From 2015, Brown appears as a political commentator on Channel 9's The Verdict with Karl Stefanovic.

== Statistics ==
Legend
G	Goals	K	Kicks	D	Disposals	T	Tackles
B	Behinds	H	Handballs	M	Marks

Season	Team	No.	Games	Totals							Averages (per game)							Votes
Season	Team	No.	Games	G	B	K	H	D	M	T	G	B	K	H	D	M	T	Votes
2002	Hawthorn	32	12	13	4	89	65	154	38	16	1.1	0.3	7.4	5.4	12.8	3.2	1.3	0
2003	Hawthorn	30	11	5	2	85	39	124	36	17	0.5	0.2	7.7	3.5	11.3	3.3	1.5	0
2004	Hawthorn	30	17	8	6	155	60	215	82	42	0.5	0.4	9.1	3.5	12.6	4.8	2.5	0
2005	Hawthorn	30	14	1	1	132	107	239	67	30	0.1	0.1	9.4	7.6	17.1	4.8	2.1	1
2006	Hawthorn	30	20	6	6	237	114	351	156	42	0.3	0.3	11.9	5.7	17.6	7.8	2.1	1
2007	Hawthorn	30	23	5	3	220	117	337	133	23	0.2	0.1	9.6	5.1	14.7	5.8	1.0	2
2008^{#}	Hawthorn	30	24	14	6	234	130	364	137	51	0.6	0.3	9.8	5.4	15.2	5.7	2.1	1
2009	Hawthorn	30	21	5	8	151	131	282	87	58	0.2	0.4	7.2	6.2	13.4	4.1	2.8	0
2010	Hawthorn	30	17	7	5	142	89	231	86	55	0.4	0.3	8.4	5.2	13.6	5.1	3.2	0
2011	Gold Coast	30	14	0	1	122	72	194	55	29	0.0	0.1	8.7	5.1	13.9	3.9	2.1	0
2012	Gold Coast	30	19	22	10	135	80	215	86	29	1.2	0.5	7.1	4.2	11.3	4.5	1.5	0
2013	Gold Coast	30	13	23	11	120	55	175	59	27	1.8	0.8	9.2	4.2	13.5	4.5	2.1	1
Career			205	109	63	1822	1059	2881	1022	419	0.5	0.3	8.9	5.2	14.1	5.0	2.0	6

== Honours and achievements ==
Team

- AFL premiership player (Hawthorn): 2008

Individual

- All-Australian team: 2007
- AFL Rising Star nominee: 2002
- 2× Australia international rules football team: 2006, 2008
- Victoria Australian rules football team: 2008
- Hawthorn life member
